= List of Major League Baseball career double plays leaders =

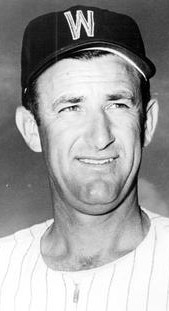
Mickey Vernon, the all-time leader in double plays.

In baseball statistics, a double play (denoted as DP) is the act of making two outs during the same continuous play. One double play is recorded for every defensive player who participates in the play, regardless of how many of the outs in which they were directly involved, and is counted in addition to whatever putouts and assists might also apply. Double plays can occur any time there is at least one baserunner and fewer than two outs.

The list reflects the overall leaders in double plays in Major League Baseball and the leaders by each position.

== Key ==
**Rank**	Rank amongst leaders in career double plays. A blank field indicates a tie.
**Player**	Name
**Throws**	Denotes right-handed (R) or left-handed (L) pitcher
**MLB**	Total career putouts as a pitcher in Major League Baseball
*	Denotes elected to National Baseball Hall of Fame
**Bold**	Denotes active player (Note: A player is considered inactive if he has announced his retirement or has not played for a full season.)

== Overall ==
The top 100 leaders in double plays in major league history. Only twenty-one of the 100 (Eddie Collins, Stuffy McInnis, Jake Daubert, Rabbit Maranville, George Sisler, Joe Judge, Charlie Grimm, Lu Blue, Jim Bottomley, Bill Terry, Lou Gehrig, Charlie Gehringer, Jimmie Foxx, Joe Kuhel, Luke Appling, Dolph Camilli, Frank McCormick, Johnny Mize, George McQuinn, Bobby Doerr, and Mickey Vernon) had careers with significant playing time prior to World War II.

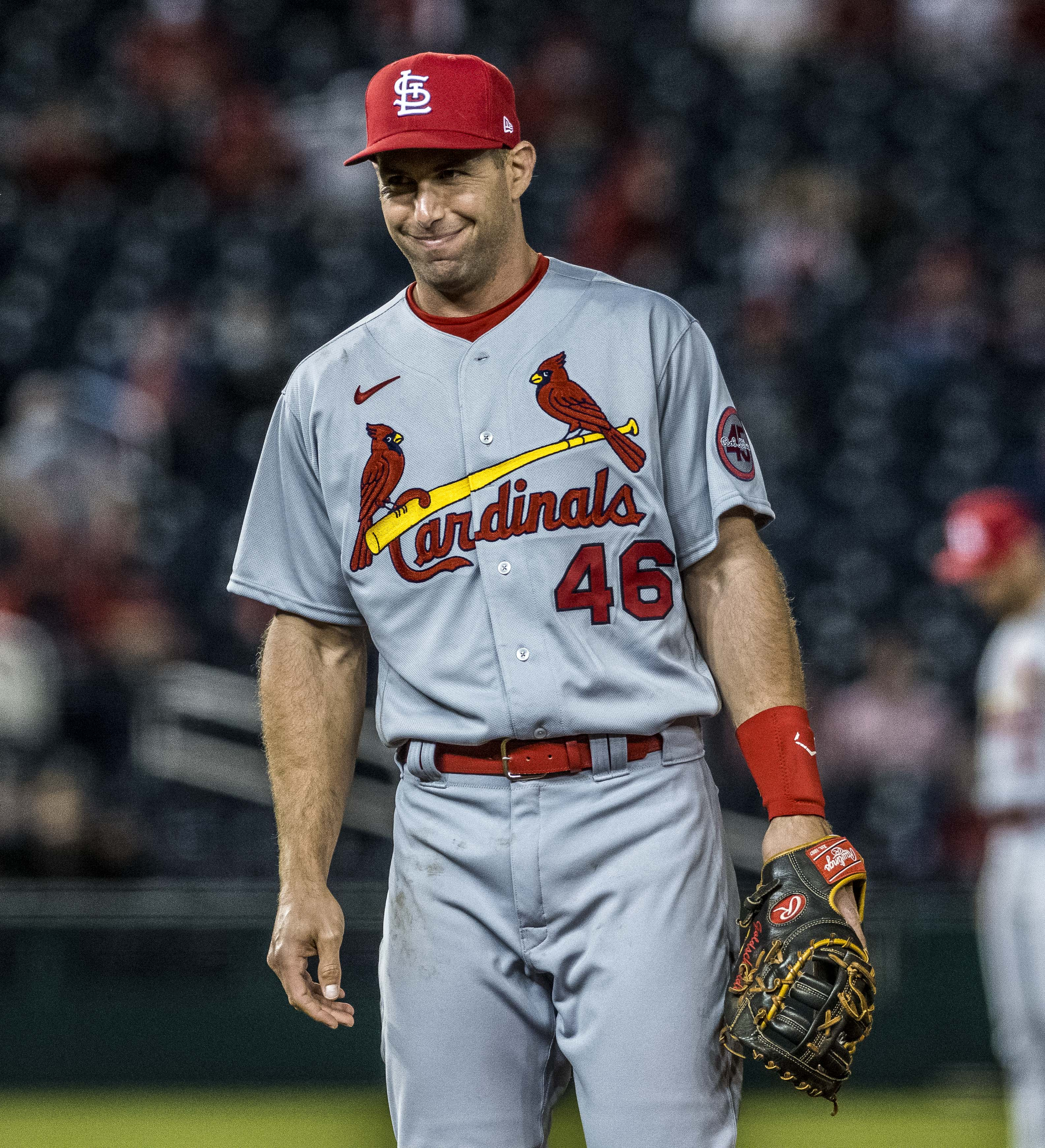
Paul Goldschmidt, the active leader in double plays and 15th all-time.

- Stats updated as of September 27, 2026.

Rank	Player (2026 DPs)	DPs	Pos.	Years played
1	Mickey Vernon	2,044	1B	1939–1943, 1946–1960
2	Eddie Murray*	2,033	1B	1977–1996
3	Todd Helton*	2,028	1B	1997–2013
4	Rafael Palmeiro	1,782	1B/LF	1986–2005
5	Fred McGriff*	1,775	1B	1986–2004
6	Joe Kuhel	1,769	1B	1930–1947
7	Omar Vizquel	1,734	SS	1989–2012
8	Charlie Grimm	1,733	1B	1916, 1918–1936
9	Bill Mazeroski*	1,706	2B	1956–1972
10	Albert Pujols	1,702	1B/3B/LF	2001–2022
11	Chris Chambliss	1,687	1B	1971–1986, 1988
12	Paul Konerko	1,660	1B	1997–2014
13	Keith Hernandez	1,654	1B	1974–1990
14	Andrés Galarraga	1,648	1B	1985–1998, 2000–2004
15	**Paul Goldschmidt (47)**	1,626	1B	2011–Present
16	Nellie Fox*	1,619	2B	1947–1965
17	Jeff Bagwell*	1,618	1B	1991–2005
	**Freddie Freeman (76)**	1,618	1B	2010–Present
19	Gil Hodges*	1,614	1B/OF	1943, 1947–1963
20	Wally Joyner	1,611	1B	1986–2001
21	Ozzie Smith*	1,590	SS	1978–1996
22	John Olerud	1,581	1B	1989–2005
23	Lou Gehrig*	1,575	1B	1923–1939
24	Will Clark	1,571	1B	1986–2000
25	Cal Ripken Jr.*	1,565	SS	1981–2001
26	Jim Bottomley*	1,562	1B	1922–1937
27	Luis Aparicio*	1,553	SS	1956–1973
28	Willie Randolph	1,547	2B	1975–1992
29	Joe Judge	1,543	1B	1915–1934
30	Mark Grace	1,533	1B	1988–2003
31	Jimmie Foxx*	1,528	1B	1925–1942, 1944–1945
32	Lou Whitaker	1,527	2B	1977–1995
33	Bobby Doerr*	1,507	2B	1937–1944, 1946–1951
34	Joe Morgan*	1,505	2B	1963–1984
35	Don Mattingly	1,500	1B/OF	1982–1995
36	Steve Garvey	1,498	1B/3B	1969–1987
37	Carlos Delgado	1,496	1B	1993–2009
38	George Sisler*	1,495	1B	1915–1922, 1924–1930
39	George Scott	1,480	1B/3B	1966–1979
40	Charlie Gehringer*	1,444	2B	1924–1942
41	Derrek Lee	1,442	1B	1997–2011
42	Joey Votto	1,432	1B	2007–2023
43	Luke Appling*	1,424	SS	1930–1950
44	Robinson Canó	1.418	2B	2005–2022
	Mark Teixeira	1,418	1B	2003–2016
46	Derek Jeter*	1,408	SS	1995–2014
	Mark McGwire	1,408	1B	1986–2001
48	Roberto Alomar*	1,407	2B	1988–2004
49	Willie McCovey*	1,405	1B/LF	1959–1980
50	Tino Martinez	1,398	1B	1990–2005
51	Frank White	1,382	2B/SS	1973–1990
52	Adrián González	1,381	1B	2004–2018
53	Red Schoendienst*	1,368	2B/LF	1945–1963
54	Cecil Cooper	1,348	1B	1971–1987
55	Norm Cash	1,347	1B	1958–1974
56	Tony Pérez*	1,342	1B/3B	1964–1986
57	Stuffy McInnis	1,338	1B	1909–1927
58	Bill Terry*	1,334	1B	1923–1936
59	Kent Hrbek	1,331	1B	1981–1994
60	Wally Pipp	1,329	1B	1913, 1915–1928
61	Jake Beckley*	1,327	1B	1888-1907
62	Johnny Mize*	1,320	1B	1936–1942, 1946–1953
63	Alan Trammell*	1,307	SS	1977–1996
	John Mayberry	1,307	1B	1968–1982
65	Roy McMillan	1,304	SS	1951–1966
66	Bobby Grich	1,302	2B/SS/1B	1970–1986
67	J.T. Snow	1,298	1B	1992–2006, 2007
68	Ian Kinsler	1,291	2B	2006–2019
69	Dave Concepción	1,290	SS	1970–1988
70	Miguel Tejada	1,274	SS	1997–2013
71	Ted Kluszewski	1,269	1B	1947–1961
72	Bill Skowron	1,266	1B	1954–1967
73	Larry Bowa	1,265	SS	1970–1985
	George McQuinn	1,265	1B	1936, 1938–1948
75	Jeff Kent*	1,261	2B/1B/3B	1992–2008
76	Eric Karros	1,257	1B	1991–2004
77	Jimmy Rollins	1,249	SS	2000–2016
	Adam LaRoche	1,249	1B	2004–2015
79	Pee Wee Reese*	1,246	SS	1940–42, 1946–58
80	Eddie Collins*	1,239	2B	1906–1930
81	Dick Groat	1,237	SS	1952, 1955–1967
82	Lee May	1,235	1B/OF	1965–1982
83	Cap Anson*	1,232	1B/3B/C	1871–1897
84	Joe Adcock	1,228	1B/LF	1950–1966
85	Royce Clayton	1,224	SS	1991–2007
86	Frank McCormick	1,221	1B	1934, 1937–1948
87	Édgar Rentería	1,218	SS	1996–2011
88	Phil Rizzuto*	1,217	SS	1941–1942, 1946–1956
89	Elvis Andrus	1,209	SS	2009–2023
90	Anthony Rizzo	1,206	1B	2011–Present
91	Jake Daubert	1,201	1B	1910–1924
92	Bill Buckner	1,200	1B/LF	1969–1990
93	Lu Blue	1,196	1B	1921–1933
	Eric Hosmer	1,196	1B	2011–2023
95	Orlando Cepeda*	1,192	1B/LF	1958–1974
96	Ray Durham	1,189	2B	1995–2008
97	Dolph Camilli	1,189	1B	1933–1943, 1945
98	Rabbit Maranville*	1,188	SS/2B	1912–1935
	Bid McPhee*	1,188	2B	1882–1899
100	Bert Campaneris	1,186	SS	1964–1983

== By position ==
=== Pitchers ===
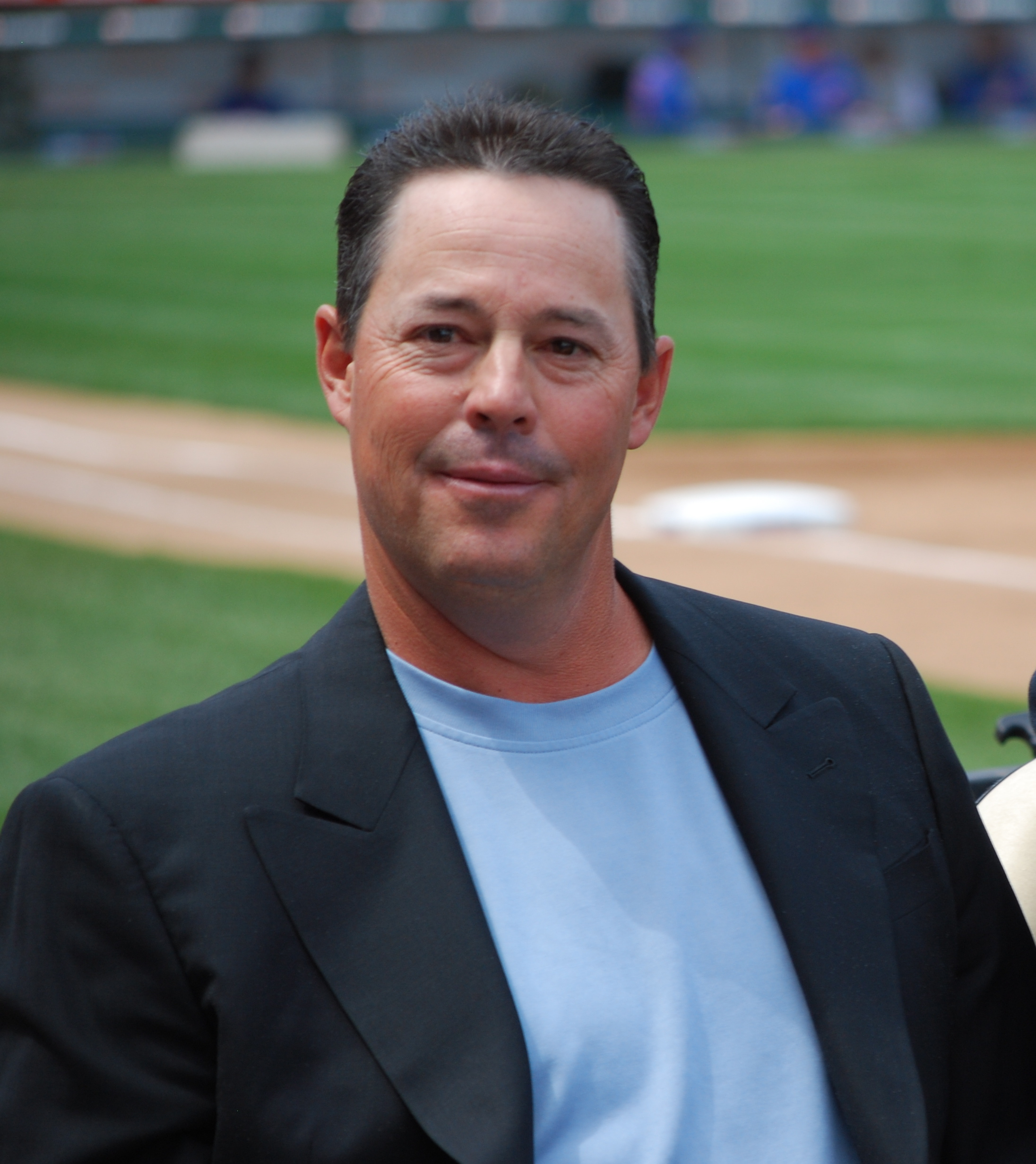
Greg Maddux, the leader in all-time double plays by a pitcher.

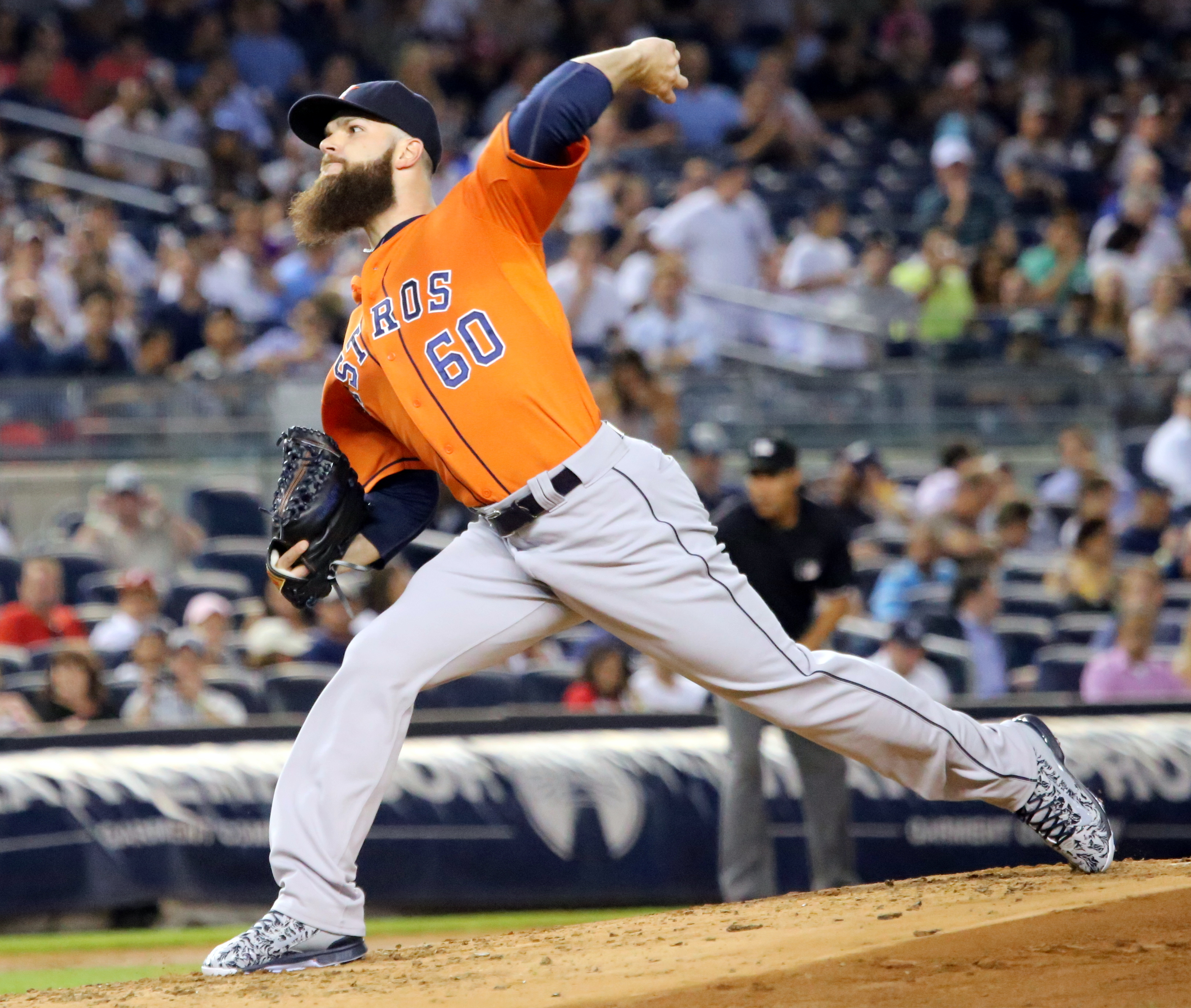
Dallas Keuchel, the active leader in double plays by a pitcher and tied for 320th all-time.

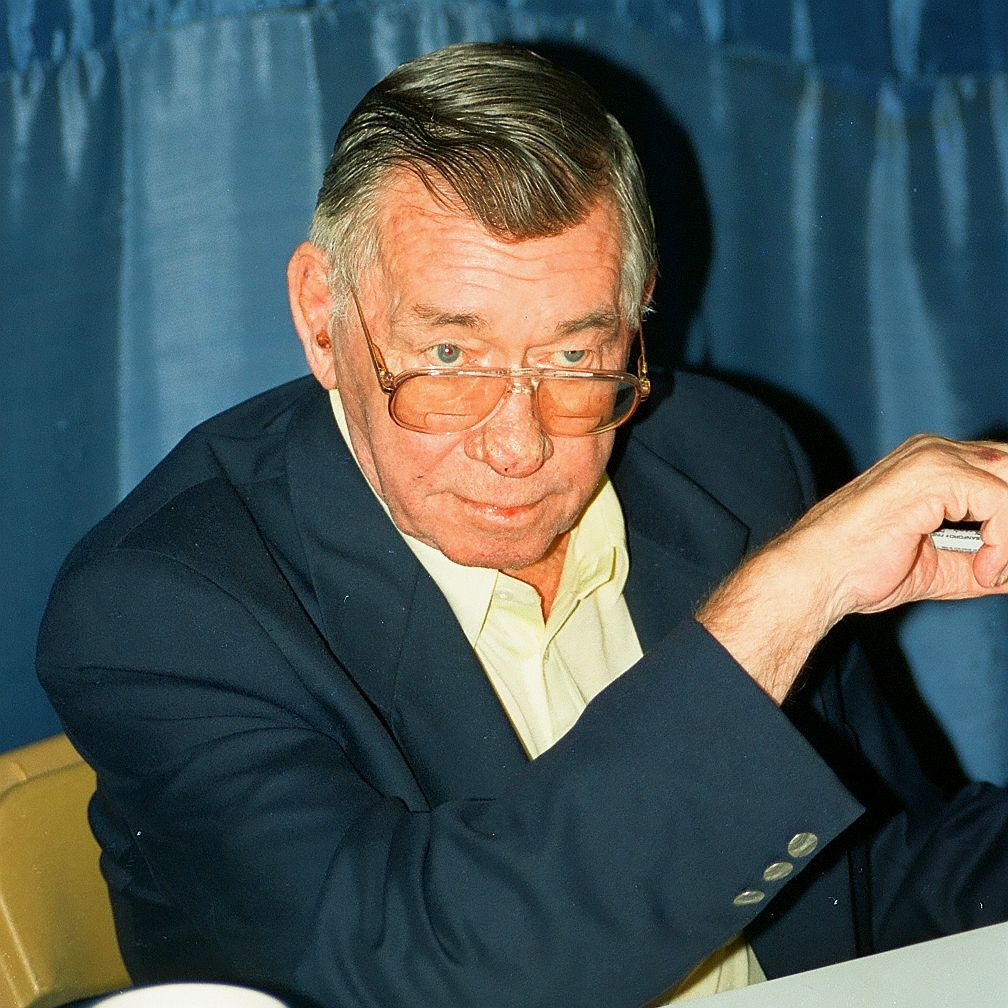
Bob Lemon holds the American League record.

- Stats updated as of the 2026 season.

Rank	Player (2027 DPs)	Throws	Double plays as a pitcher			Other leagues, notes
Rank	Player (2027 DPs)	Throws	MLB	American League	National League	Other leagues, notes
1	Greg Maddux*	R	98	0	98	
2	Phil Niekro*	R	83	8	75	
3	Warren Spahn*	L	82	0	82	
4	Freddie Fitzsimmons	R	79	0	79	
5	Bob Lemon*	R	78	78	0	
6	Bucky Walters	R	76	0	76	
7	Walter Johnson*	R	75	75	0	
8	Burleigh Grimes*	R	74	0	74	
9	Tommy John	L	69	49	20	
10	Tom Glavine*	L	67	0	67	
11	Liván Hernández	R	65	0	65	
	Jim Kaat*	L	65	55	10	
	Kenny Rogers	L	65	63	2	
14	Dizzy Trout	R	63	63	0	
15	Zack Greinke	R	62	25	37	
16	Dennis Martínez	R	61	36	25	
17	Carl Mays	R	59	37	22	
18	Gaylord Perry*	R	58	23	35	
19	Ted Lyons*	R	57	57	0	
20	Eppa Rixey*	L	56	0	56	
21	Lew Burdette	R	55	1	54	
	Don Drysdale*	R	55	0	55	
	Carl Hubbell*	L	55	0	55	
24	Murry Dickson	R	54	3	51	
	Willis Hudlin	R	54	54	0	
	Kirk Rueter	L	54	0	54	
	Tom Seaver*	R	54	5	49	
28	Mark Buehrle	L	53	48	5	
	Jim Palmer*	R	53	53	0	
	Eddie Rommel	R	53	53	0	
31	Bullet Joe Bush	R	52	51	1	
32	Sad Sam Jones	R	51	51	0	
	Red Ruffing*	R	51	51	0	
34	Art Nehf	L	50	0	50	
35	Grover Cleveland Alexander*	R	49	0	49	
	Whitey Ford*	L	49	0	49	
	Paul Splittorff	L	49	0	49	
38	Bert Blyleven*	R	48	42	6	
	Jamie Moyer	L	48	40	8	
	Bobby Shantz	L	48	42	6	
41	Bartolo Colón	R	47	30	17	
	Stan Coveleski*	R	47	47	0	
	Early Wynn*	R	47	47	0	
44	John Denny	R	46	11	35	
	Bob Gibson*	R	46	0	46	
	Larry Jackson	R	46	0	46	
	Herb Pennock*	L	46	46	0	
	Rick Wise	R	46	15	31	
49	Ferguson Jenkins*	R	45	23	22	
	Robin Roberts*	R	45	8	37	
	Dave Stieb	R	45	45	0	
52	John Clarkson*	R	44	0	44	
	Pud Galvin*	R	44	0	39	Includes 3 in American Association, 1 in National Association, and 1 in Players' League
	Orel Hershiser	R	44	6	38	
	Claude Passeau	R	44	0	44	
	Fritz Peterson	L	44	44	0	
57	Mordecai Brown*	R	43	0	36	Includes 7 in Federal League
	Johnny Schmitz	L	43	17	26	
	George Uhle	R	43	43	0	
60	Harry Gumbert	R	42	0	42	
	Mike Hampton	L	42	0	42	
	Clarence Mitchell	L	42	0	42	
	Don Sutton*	R	42	6	36	
	Javier Vázquez	R	42	15	27	
65	Scott Erickson	R	41	40	1	
	Ned Garver	R	41	41	0	
	Ray Herbert	R	41	36	5	
	Sid Hudson	R	41	41	0	
	Vern Law	R	41	0	41	
	Dutch Leonard	R	41	26	15	
	Christy Mathewson*	R	41	0	41	
	Lee Meadows	R	41	0	41	
	Tony Mullane	R	41	0	11	Includes 30 in American Association
	Joe Niekro	R	41	8	33	
75	Larry French	L	40	0	40	
	Bob Friend	R	40	0	40	
	Mudcat Grant	R	40	38	2	
	Hal Newhouser*	L	40	40	0	
	Frank Tanana	L	40	39	1	
	Cy Young*	R	40	18	22	
81	Mike Caldwell	L	39	24	15	
	Curt Davis	R	39	0	39	
	Waite Hoyt*	R	39	29	10	
	Mike Morgan	R	39	19	20	
	Jack Quinn	R	39	34	3	Includes 2 in Federal League
	Charles Radbourn*	R	39	0	35	Includes 4 in Players' League
	Rick Reuschel	R	39	0	39	
88	Elden Auker	R	38	38	0	
	Jim Bagby	R	38	36	2	
	Guy Bush	R	38	0	38	
	Jon Garland	R	38	29	9	
	Mel Harder	R	38	38	0	
	Charlie Hough	R	38	32	6	
	Danny MacFayden	R	38	22	16	
	Milt Pappas	R	38	23	15	
	Dan Petry	R	38	38	0	
	Jerry Reuss	L	38	6	32	
	Bob Stanley	R	38	38	0	
	Mel Stottlemyre	R	38	38	0	
	Walt Terrell	R	38	27	11	
	Mike Torrez	R	38	21	17	

=== Catchers ===
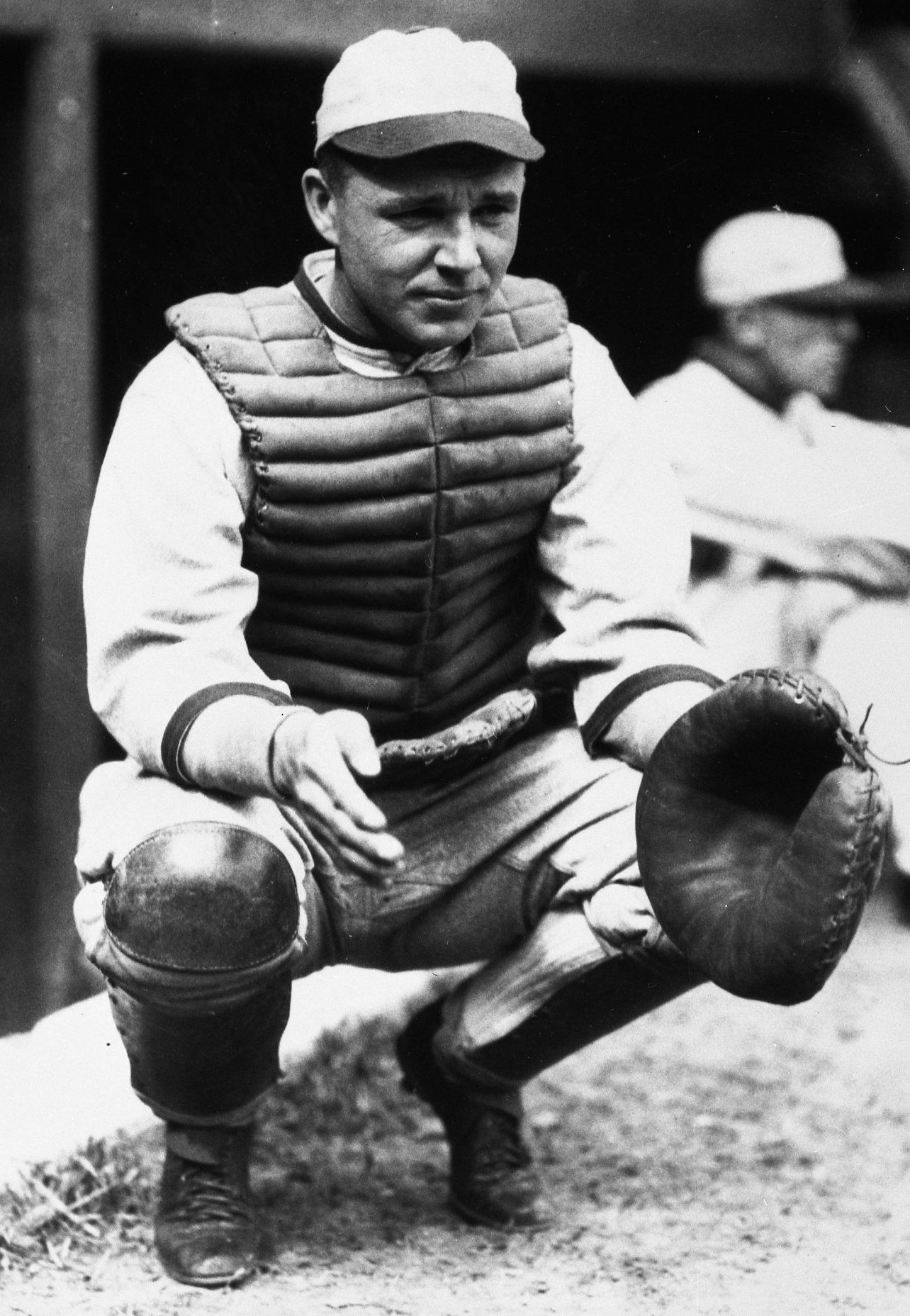
Ray Schalk, the leader in all-time double plays by a catcher.

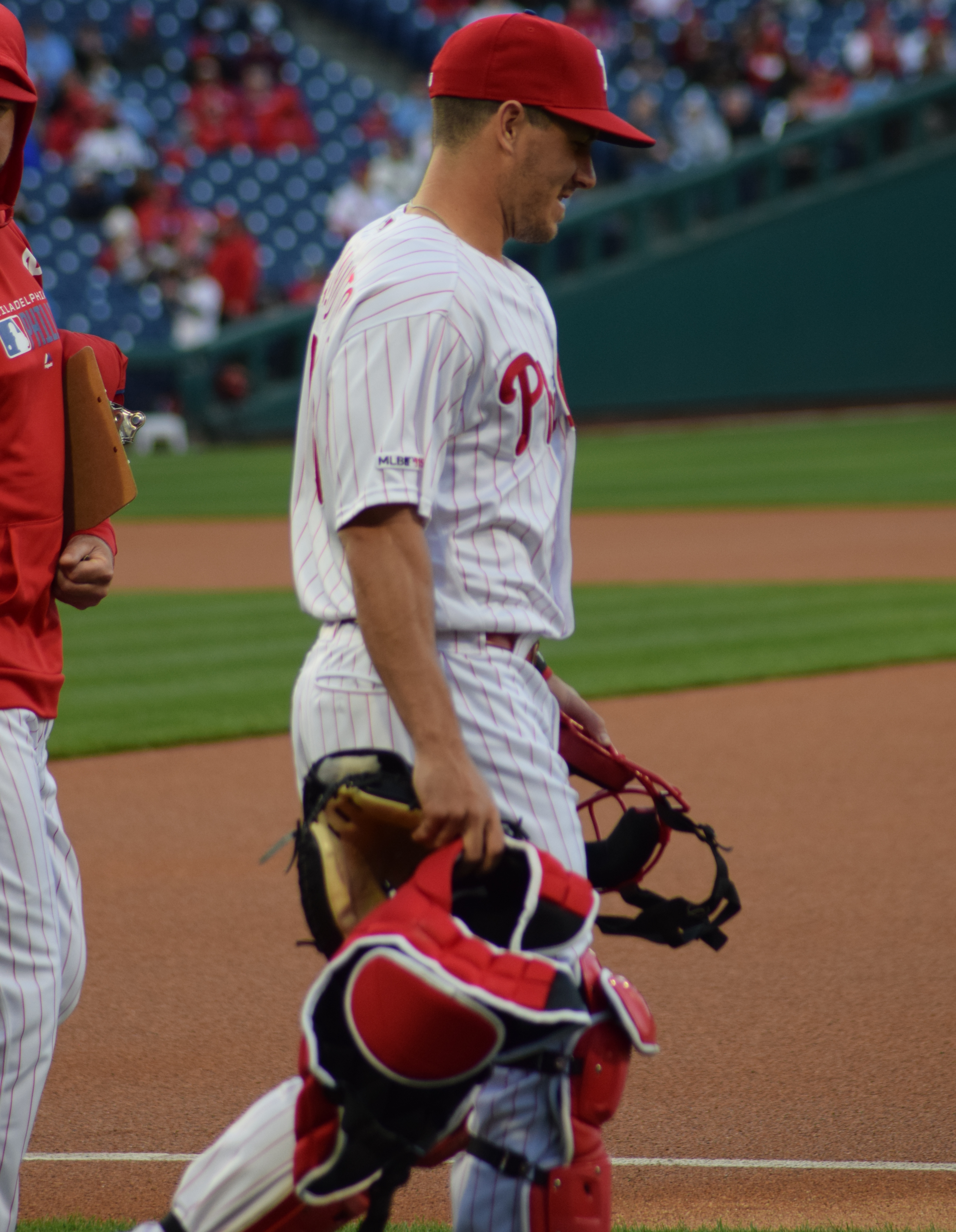
J. T. Realmuto, the active leader in double plays by a catcher and tied for 75th all-time.

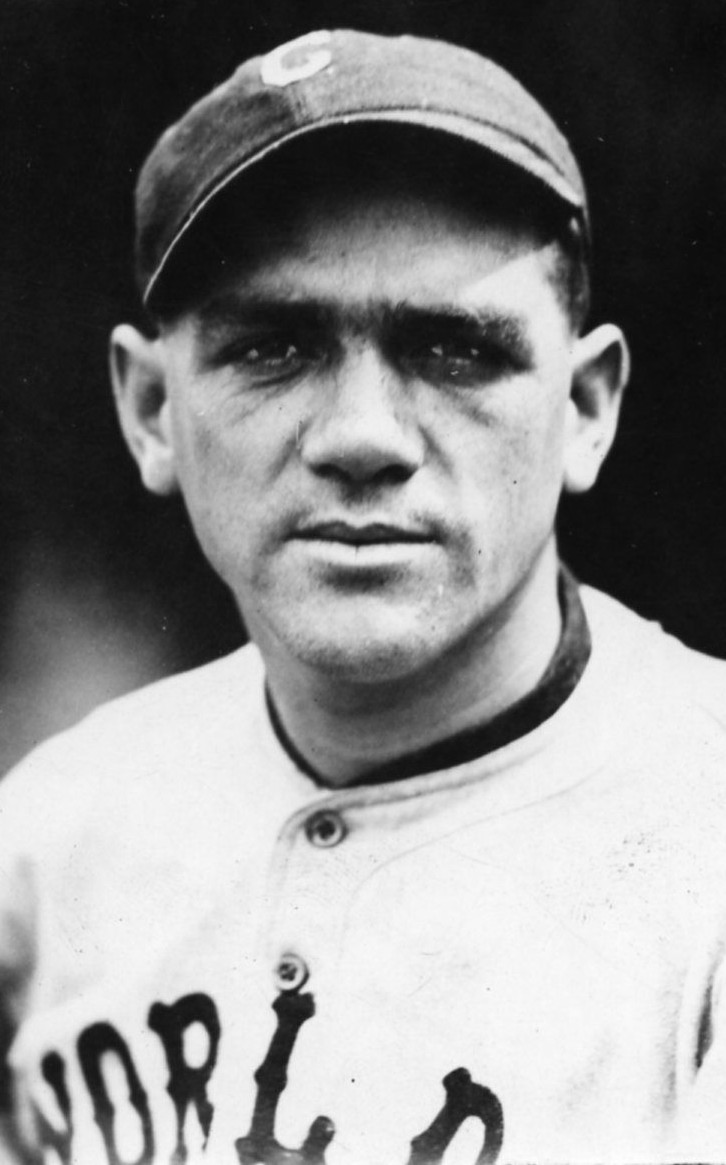
Steve O'Neill had 36 double plays in 1916, the only season of 30 or more in major league history.

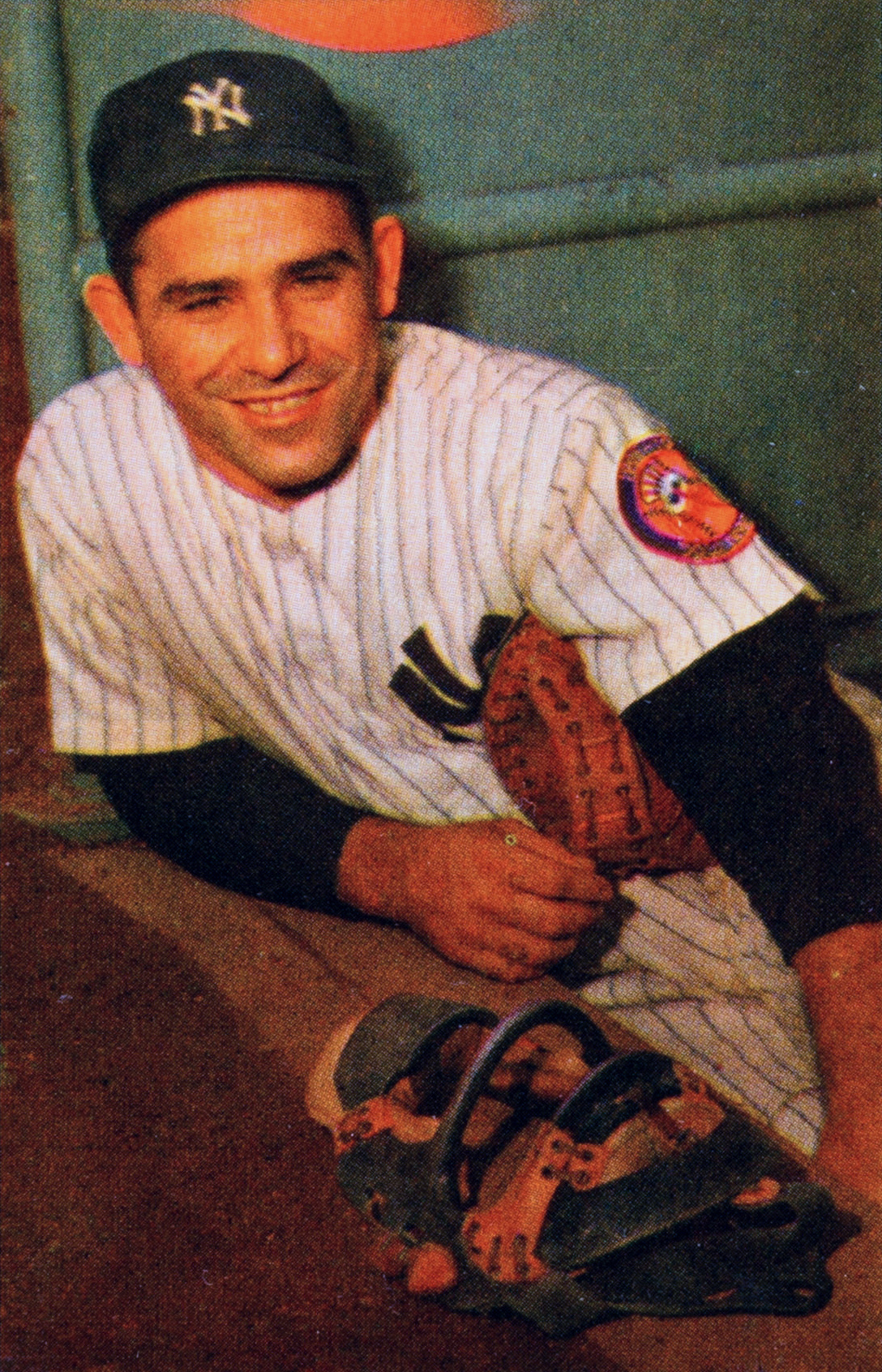
Yogi Berra led the American League in double plays a record six times.

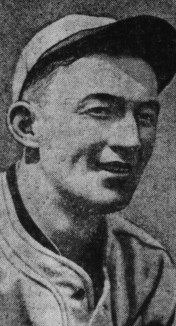
Gabby Hartnett holds the National League record.

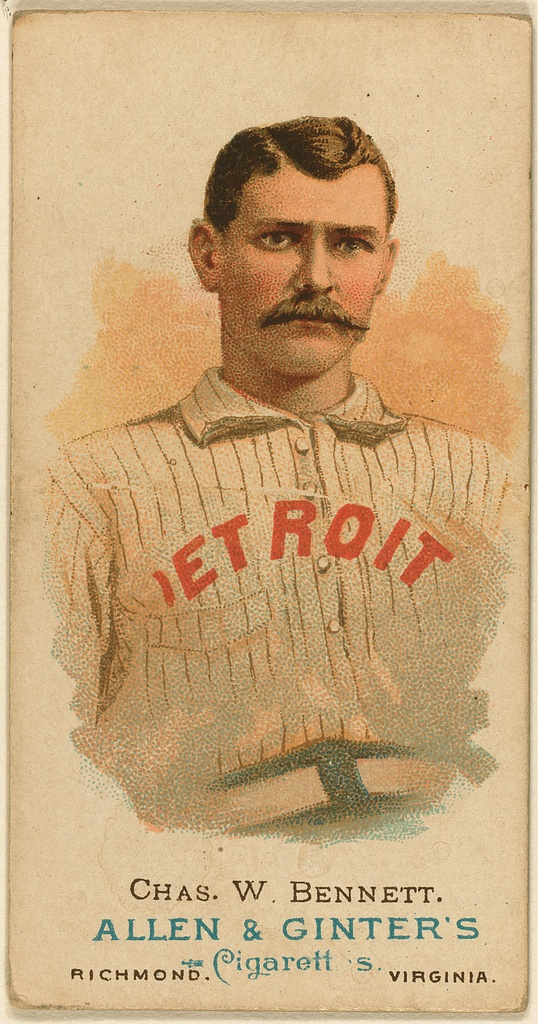
Charlie Bennett was the first catcher to record 100 double plays.

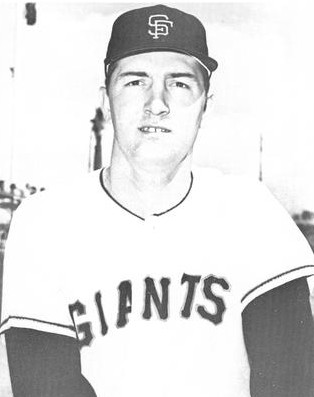
Tom Haller set the National League record of 23 double plays in 1968.

Catchers typically record double plays by throwing out a runner attempting to steal a base immediately after the batter has struck out, by tagging out a runner attempting to score a run after receiving a throw from an outfielder on an attempted sacrifice fly, by stepping on home plate to force out a runner with the bases loaded and then throwing out another runner (often the batter trying to reach first base), or by tagging out a runner attempting to score after an out has been recorded at another base. Double plays are also occasionally recorded when a rundown play is involved, almost always as the second out. On August 2, 1985, Carlton Fisk of the Chicago White Sox recorded a double play by tagging out two New York Yankees moments apart at home plate when both tried to score on a double. The feat was duplicated by Paul Lo Duca of the New York Mets in Game 1 of the 2006 National League Division Series against the Los Angeles Dodgers.

Many of the career leaders were active during baseball's dead-ball era when runners made more aggressive attempts to advance around the bases in risky situations; 13 of the top 18 single-season totals, and 28 of the top 37, were recorded before 1928. Ray Schalk holds the record for the most career double plays by a catcher with 222. Steve O'Neill is second with 198; only seven other catchers have recorded 150 career double plays.

- Stats updated as of the 2026 season.

Rank	Player (2027 DPs)	Double plays as a catcher			Other leagues, notes
Rank	Player (2027 DPs)	MLB	American League	National League	Other leagues, notes
1	Ray Schalk*	222	222	0	Held the American League single-season record, 1913-1914 (tie)
2	Steve O'Neill	198	198	0	Held major league record, 1920-1923; held American League record, 1917-1923; holds the single-season record of 36 (set in 1916)
3	Yogi Berra*	175	175	0	
4	Gabby Hartnett*	163	0	163	
5	Iván Rodríguez*	158	136	22	
6	Tony Peña	156	64	92	
7	Bob Boone	154	87	67	
	Wally Schang	154	154	0	
9	Jimmie Wilson	153	0	153	Held National League record, 1935-1938
10	Gary Carter*	149	0	149	
11	Jason Kendall	148	30	118	
12	Carlton Fisk*	147	147	0	
13	Jim Sundberg	145	142	3	
14	Deacon McGuire	143	32	90	Includes 21 in American Association; held major league record, 1904-1920
15	Rollie Hemsley	141	97	44	
	Ivey Wingo	141	0	141	Held National League record, 1924-1935
17	Rick Ferrell*	139	139	0	
	Muddy Ruel	139	139	0	
	Luke Sewell	139	139	0	
20	Bill Dickey*	137	137	0	
	Al López*	137	1	136	
	Yadier Molina	137	0	137	
23	Jim Hegan	136	130	6	
24	Charles Zimmer	135	0	128	Includes 7 in American Association; held major league record, 1900-1904; held National League record, 1901-1924; held the single-season record, 1894-1897
25	Lance Parrish	133	117	16	
26	Brad Ausmus	130	17	113	
	Benito Santiago	130	13	117	
28	Bill Killefer	129	18	111	
29	Johnny Bench*	127	0	127	
	Johnny Kling	127	0	127	Held the single-season record, 1902-1909 (tie), 1912-1914; held the National League single-season record, 1912-1922
31	Red Dooin	122	0	122	Held the single-season record, 1908-1909 (tie)
32	Del Crandall	116	2	114	
33	Charlie Bennett	114	0	114	Held major league record, 1887-1900
34	George Gibson	112	0	112	
	Heinie Peitz	112	0	112	
36	Rick Dempsey	111	100	11	
	Wilbert Robinson*	111	8	46	Includes 57 in American Association
	John Roseboro	111	22	89	
	Billy Sullivan	111	98	13	Held the American League single-season record, 1901–1907
40	Frank Snyder	108	0	108	
41	Charles Johnson	107	21	86	
	Ernie Lombardi*	107	0	107	
	Cy Perkins	107	107	0	
	Hank Severeid	107	103	4	
45	Bill Bergen	106	0	106	Held the single-season record, 1909-1912
	Frankie Hayes	106	106	0	
47	Frank Bowerman	105	0	105	
	Johnny Edwards	105	0	105	
	Larry McLean	105	0	105	Held the single-season record, 1910-1912 (tie)
	Oscar Stanage	105	105	0	
51	Mickey Cochrane*	104	104	0	
	Darrell Porter	104	76	28	
	Ted Simmons*	104	16	88	
54	Lou Criger	102	78	24	
	Duke Farrell	102	7	78	Includes 12 in Players' League, 5 in American Association
56	Sherm Lollar	101	101	0	
	Bob O'Farrell	101	0	101	Held the National League single-season record, 1922-1968
	A. J. Pierzynski	101	82	19	
59	Malachi Kittridge	100	15	85	
	Gus Mancuso	100	0	100	
	Jack Warner	100	21	79	Held the single-season record, 1897-1909
62	Eddie Ainsmith	99	79	20	
	Chief Meyers	99	0	99	
64	Bill Freehan	98	98	0	
65	Spud Davis	97	0	97	
	Mike Scioscia	97	0	97	
67	Roger Bresnahan*	96	3	93	
68	Jack Clements	94	0	94	
69	Hank Gowdy	93	0	93	
	Ramón Hernández	93	66	27	
	Mickey Owen	93	4	89	
72	Mike González	92	0	92	
	Terry Kennedy	92	14	78	
	Buddy Rosar	92	92	0	
75	Roy Campanella*	89	0	79	Includes 10 in Negro National League (second) (incomplete)
	**J.T. Realmuto (0)**	89	0	89	
77	Mike Piazza*	88	0	88	
	Butch Wynegar	88	88	0	
79	Elston Howard	87	87	0	Negro League totals unavailable
	Birdie Tebbetts	87	87	0	
81	Tom Haller	86	1	85	Holds the National League single-season record of 23 (set in 1968)
	Otto Miller	86	0	86	
	Jocko Milligan	86	0	15	Includes 58 in American Association, 13 in the Players' League
84	Mike Matheny	85	22	63	
	Walter Schmidt	85	0	85	
86	Brian McCann	84	18	66	
	Joe Sugden	84	36	48	
88	Bill Rariden	83	0	51	Includes 32 in Federal League
	Zack Taylor	83	0	83	
	Sammy White	83	79	4	
91	Doc Bushong	82	0	41	Includes 40 in American Association, 1 in National Association; held major league record, 1886-1887; held the single-season record, 1886-1887
	Kirt Manwaring	82	0	82	
	Thurman Munson	82	82	0	
	Wes Westrum	82	0	82	
95	John Bateman	81	0	81	
	Jorge Posada	81	81	0	
97	Walker Cooper	80	0	80	
	Andy Seminick	80	0	80	
99	Clay Dalrymple	79	3	76	
100	Henry Blanco	78	11	67	
	Buck Ewing*	78	0	71	Includes 7 in Players' League
	Russell Martin	78	27	51	

=== First Basemen ===
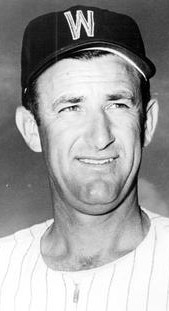
Mickey Vernon, the leader in all-time double plays by a first baseman.

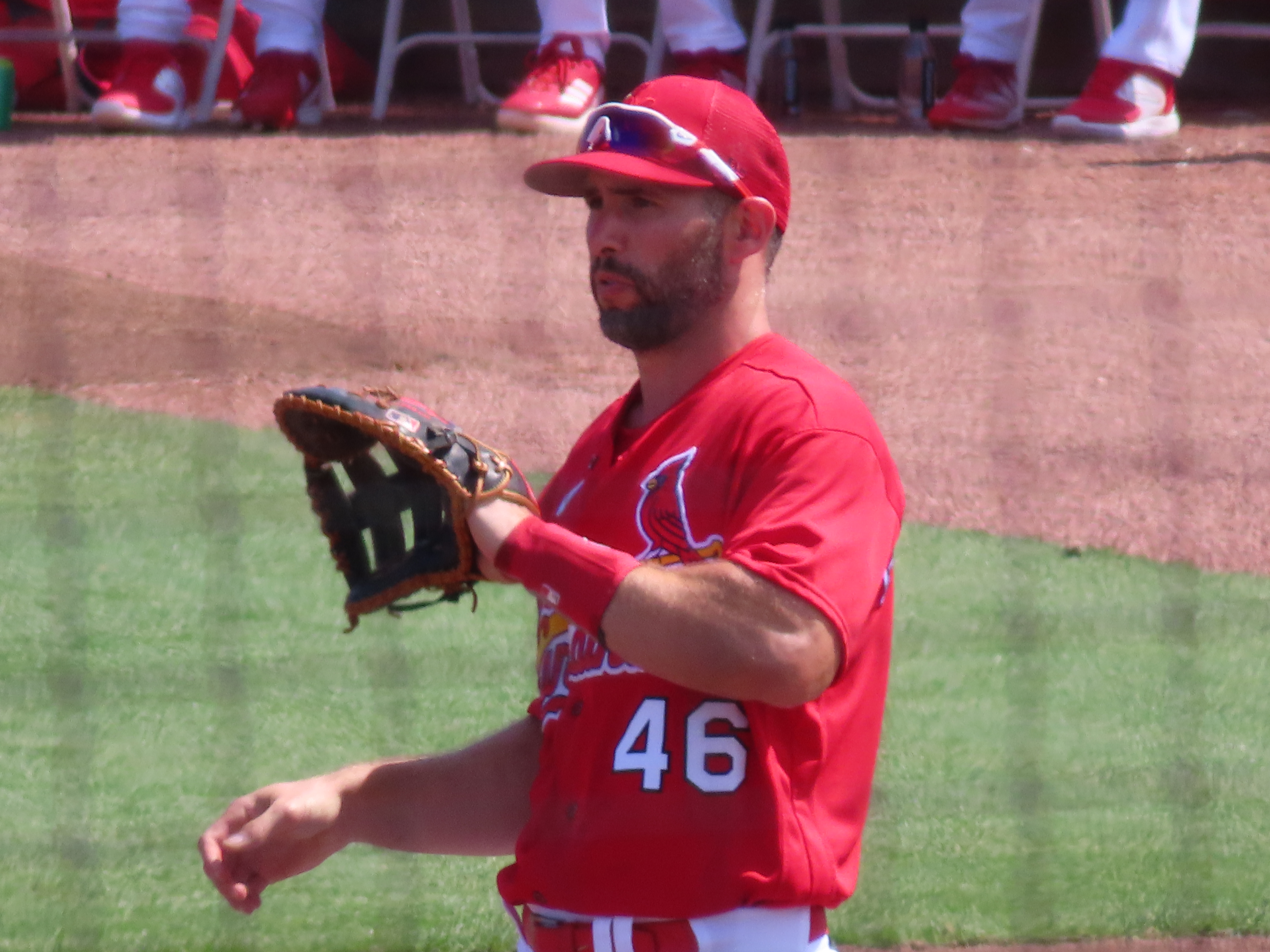
Paul Goldschmidt, the active leader and 13th all-time in double plays by a first baseman.

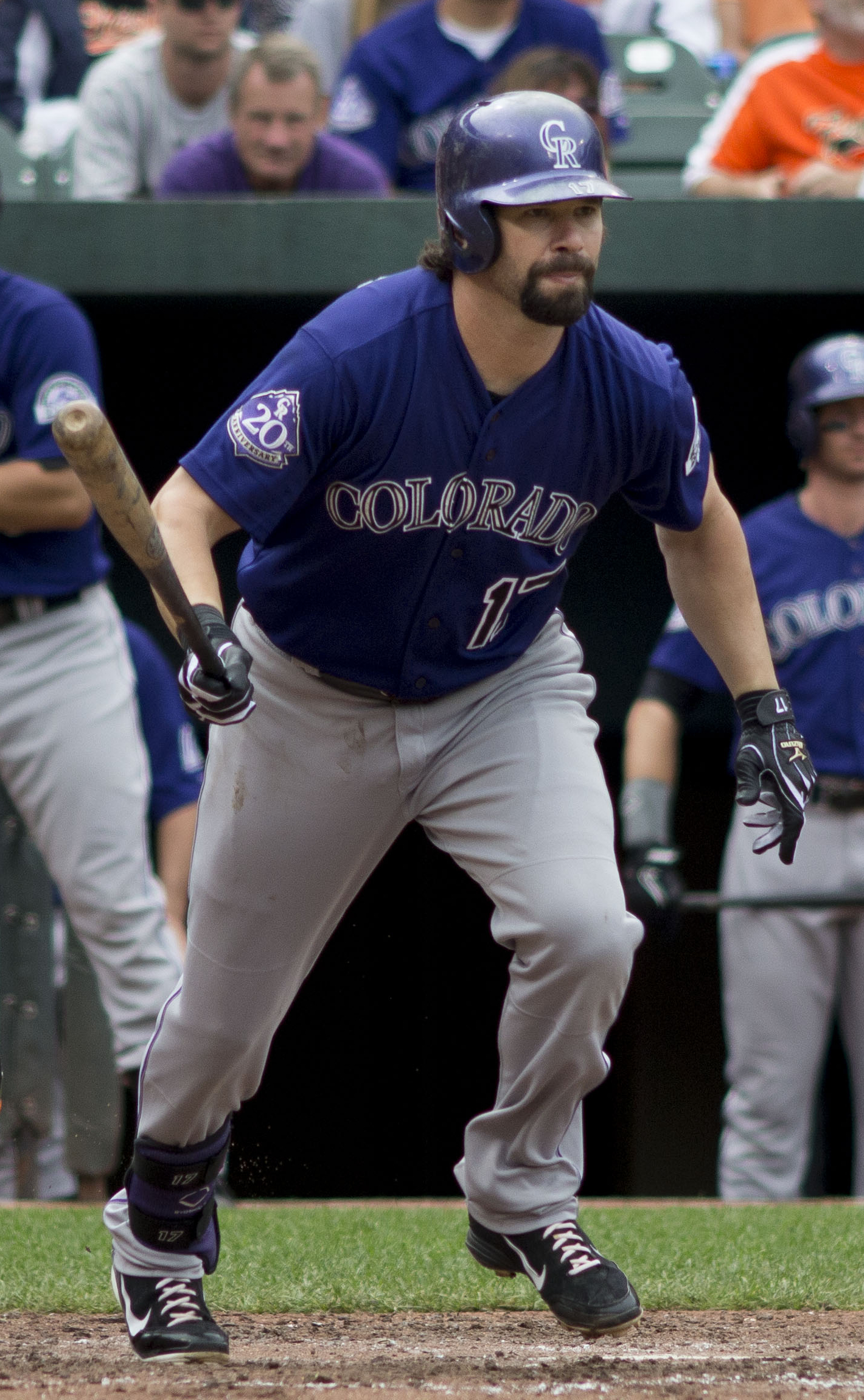
Todd Helton holds the National League record.

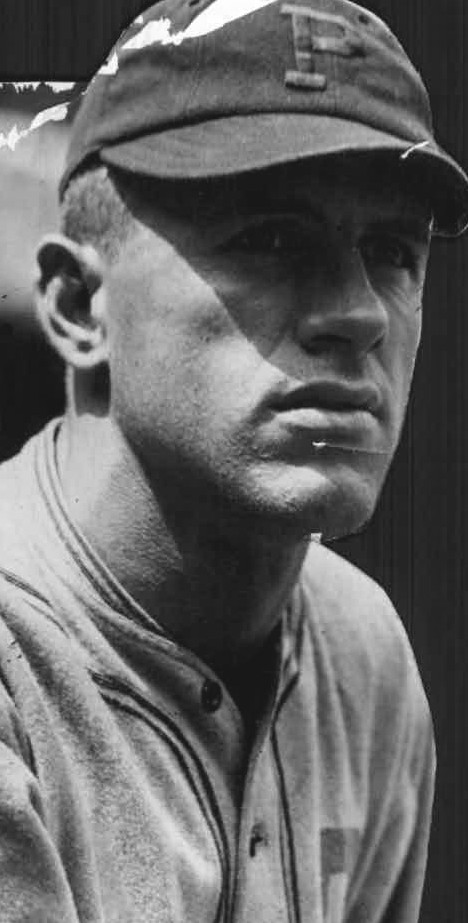
Charlie Grimm held the National League record for 80 years.

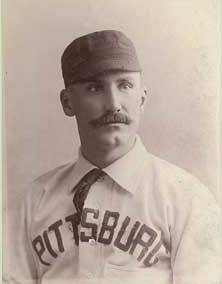
Jake Beckley held the major league record for 21 years.

Cap Anson reached 1,000 double plays before any other first baseman.

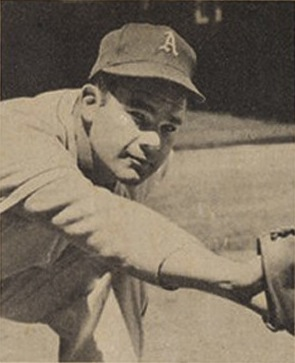
Ferris Fain holds the single-season record of 194 double plays.

Most of the career leaders are relatively recent players who have benefitted from improved infield defense, with equipment of better quality; 10 of the top 13 players made their major league debut after 1970. Longer careers have compensated for the fact that as strikeout totals have risen in baseball, the frequency of other defensive outs including ground outs has declined, with double play totals for first basemen likewise declining; 16 of the top 20 single-season totals were recorded between 1944 and 1980. Because a right-handed first baseman needs to turn their body before throwing across the infield, left-handed first basemen are often preferred for defensive purposes; 14 of the top 21 career double-play leaders are left-handed. Mickey Vernon holds the record for the most career double plays by a first baseman with 2,044. Eddie Murray (2,033) and Todd Helton (2,028) are the only other first basemen who have recorded 2,000 career double plays.

- Stats updated as of September 27, 2026.

Rank	Player (2026 DPs)	Double plays as a first baseman			Other leagues, notes
Rank	Player (2026 DPs)	MLB	American League	National League	Other leagues, notes
1	Mickey Vernon	2,044	2,041	3	
2	Eddie Murray*	2,033	1,500	533	Holds record for right-handed first baseman
3	Todd Helton*	2,028	0	2,028	
4	Rafael Palmeiro	1,782	1,766	16	
5	Fred McGriff*	1,775	882	893	
6	Joe Kuhel	1,769	1,769	0	Held major league record, 1946–1955; held American League record, 1944–1955; held the single-season record, 1935-1938
7	Charlie Grimm	1,733	0	1,733	Held major league record, 1932–1946; held National League record, 1930–2010; held the single-season record, 1924-1926
8	Albert Pujols	1,702	439	1,263	
9	Chris Chambliss	1,687	1,073	614	
10	Paul Konerko	1,660	1,650	10	
11	Keith Hernandez	1,654	28	1,626	
12	Andrés Galarraga	1,648	28	1,620	
13	**Paul Goldschmidt (47)**	1,626	120	1,506	
14	Jeff Bagwell*	1,618	0	1,618	
15	**Freddie Freeman (76)**	1,617	0	1,617	
16	Gil Hodges*	1,614	0	1,614	Held the National League single-season record, 1950-1966
17	Wally Joyner	1,611	1,227	384	
18	John Olerud	1,581	1,210	371	
19	Lou Gehrig*	1,575	1,575	0	Held American League record, 1938–1944; held the single-season record, 1938-1944
20	Will Clark	1,571	612	959	
21	Jim Bottomley*	1,562	119	1,443	Held the single-season record, 1927–1935; held the National League single-season record, 1927-1938
22	Joe Judge	1,543	1,519	24	Held American League record, 1928–1938; held the single-season record, 1922-1923 (tie); held the AL single-season record, 1922-1925 (tie)
23	Mark Grace	1,533	0	1,533	
24	Jimmie Foxx*	1,528	1,477	51	
25	Don Mattingly	1,500	1,500	0	
26	Steve Garvey	1,498	0	1,498	
27	Carlos Delgado	1,496	1,045	451	
28	George Sisler*	1,495	1,161	334	Held major league record, 1929–1932; held the single-season record, 1926–1927; held the American League single-season record, 1917-1918 (tie), 1926-1934
29	George Scott	1,480	1,480	0	
30	Derrek Lee	1,442	67	1,375	
31	Joey Votto	1,432	0	1,432	
32	Mark Teixeira	1,418	1,287	131	
33	Mark McGwire	1,408	1,012	396	
34	Willie McCovey*	1,405	0	1,405	
35	Tino Martinez	1,398	1,187	211	
36	Adrián González	1,381	226	1,155	
37	Cecil Cooper	1,348	1,348	0	
38	Norm Cash	1,347	1,347	0	
39	Tony Pérez*	1,342	213	1,129	
40	Stuffy McInnis	1,338	1,001	337	Held major league record, 1926–1929; held the single-season record, 1923-1924 (tie)
41	Bill Terry*	1,334	0	1,334	
42	Kent Hrbek	1,331	1,331	0	
43	Wally Pipp	1,329	1,034	295	Held the American League single-season record, 1917-1918 (tie), 1920–1921; held the National League single-season record, 1926-1927
44	Jake Beckley*	1,327	0	1,266	Includes 61 in Players' League; held major league record, 1905-1926
45	Johnny Mize*	1,320	215	1,105	
46	John Mayberry	1,307	1,257	50	
47	J. T. Snow	1,298	415	883	
48	Ted Kluszewski	1,269	102	1,167	
49	Bill Skowron	1,266	1,222	44	
50	George McQuinn	1,265	1,235	30	Held the single-season record, 1940-1944 (tie)
51	Eric Karros	1,257	15	1,242	
52	Adam LaRoche	1,249	44	1,205	
53	Lee May	1,235	335	900	
54	Cap Anson*	1,232	0	1,191	Includes 41 in National Association; held major league record, 1886–1905; held the single-season record, 1884–1889; held National League single-season record, 1884-1892
55	Joe Adcock	1,228	268	960	
56	Frank McCormick	1,221	0	1,221	Held the National League single-season record, 1939-1950
57	Anthony Rizzo	1,206	217	989	
58	Jake Daubert	1,201	0	1,201	
59	Bill Buckner	1,200	410	790	
60	Lu Blue	1,196	1,196	0	
	Eric Hosmer	1,196	807	389	
62	Orlando Cepeda*	1,192	0	1,192	
63	Dolph Camilli	1,189	62	1,127	
64	Justin Morneau	1,180	988	192	
65	Bill White	1,157	0	1,157	
66	Hal Trosky	1,146	1,146	0	Held the American League single-season record, 1934-1935
67	George Burns	1,145	1,145	0	Held the American League single-season record, 1918-1920
68	Carlos Peña	1,140	1,036	104	
69	Donn Clendenon	1,136	0	1,136	Holds the National League single-season record of 182 (set in 1966)
70	Boog Powell	1,131	1,130	1	
71	Rod Carew*	1,130	1,130	0	
72	Lyle Overbay	1,125	699	426	
73	Ferris Fain	1,124	1,124	0	Holds the single-season record of 194 (set in 1949)
74	Mo Vaughn	1,119	1,003	116	
75	George Kelly*	1,113	0	1,113	Held the National League single-season record, 1921-1923
76	Ryan Howard	1,106	0	1,106	
77	Earl Torgeson	1,097	346	751	
78	Ed Konetchy	1,093	0	1,010	Includes 83 in Federal League
	Jason Thompson	1,090	593	497	
80	Elbie Fletcher	1,086	0	1,086	
	Pete O'Brien	1,086	1,086	0	
	Gus Suhr	1,086	0	1,086	Held the National League single-season record, 1938-1939
83	Rudy York	1,072	1,072	0	Held the single-season record, 1944-1949
84	**Carlos Santana (4)**	1,068	867	201	
85	Vic Power	1,056	1,047	9	
86	Mike Hargrove	1,043	1,019	24	
87	José Abreu	1,033	1,033	0	
88	Prince Fielder	1,025	292	733	
89	Eddie Robinson	1,018	1,018	0	
90	Phil Cavarretta	1,012	29	983	
91	Ernie Banks*	1,005	0	1,005	
92	Chris Davis	1,002	1,002	0	
93	Jason Giambi	995	947	48	
94	Dan Driessen	979	0	979	
95	Miguel Cabrera	974	974	0	
96	Hank Greenberg*	973	888	85	
97	Walt Dropo	968	926	42	
98	Willie Montañez	962	15	947	
99	Jim Spencer	956	956	0	
	Fred Tenney	956	0	956	

=== Second Basemen ===
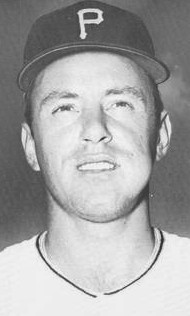
Bill Mazeroski, the leader in all-time double plays by a second baseman

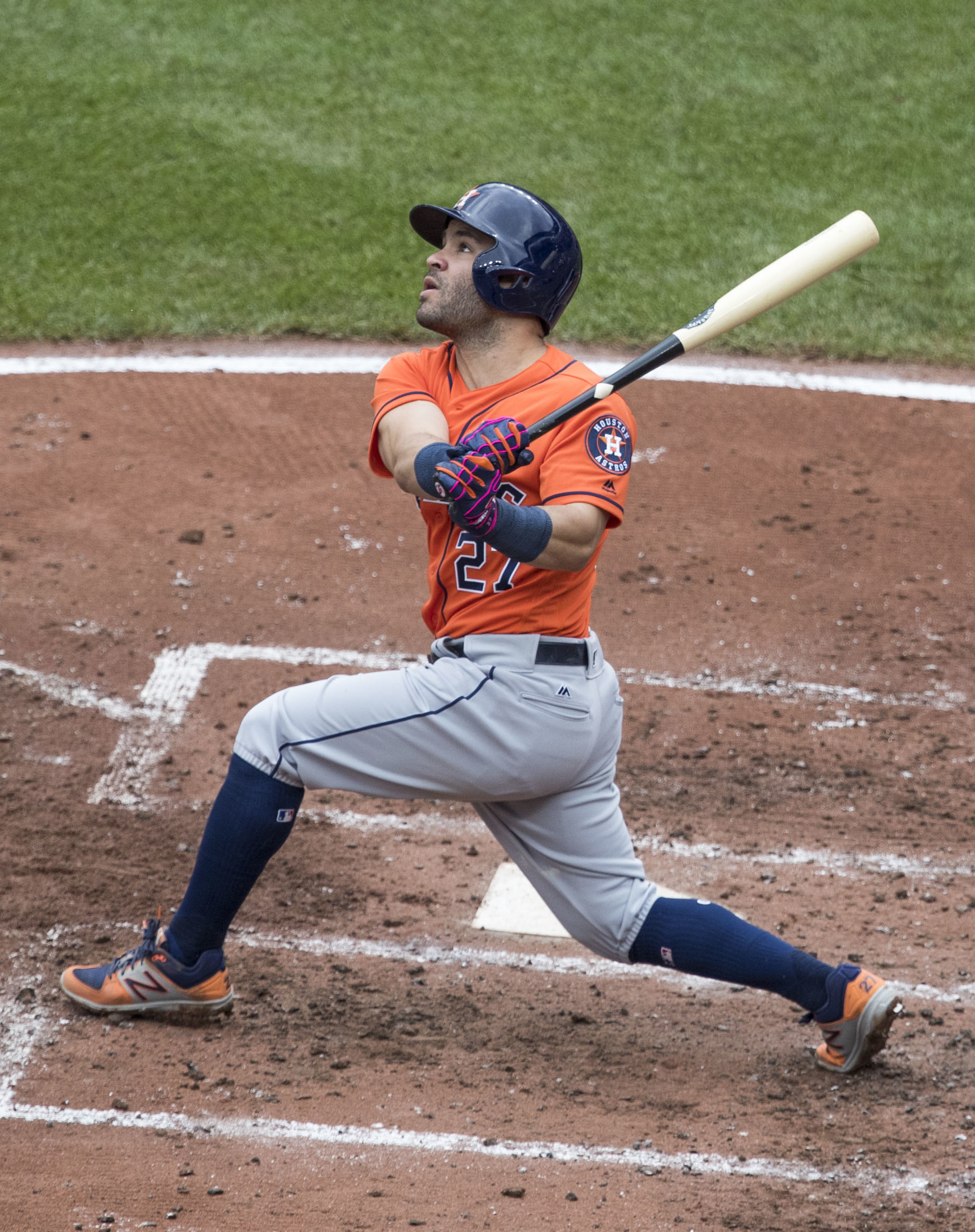
Jose Altuve, the active leader and is 24th all-time in double plays by a second baseman.

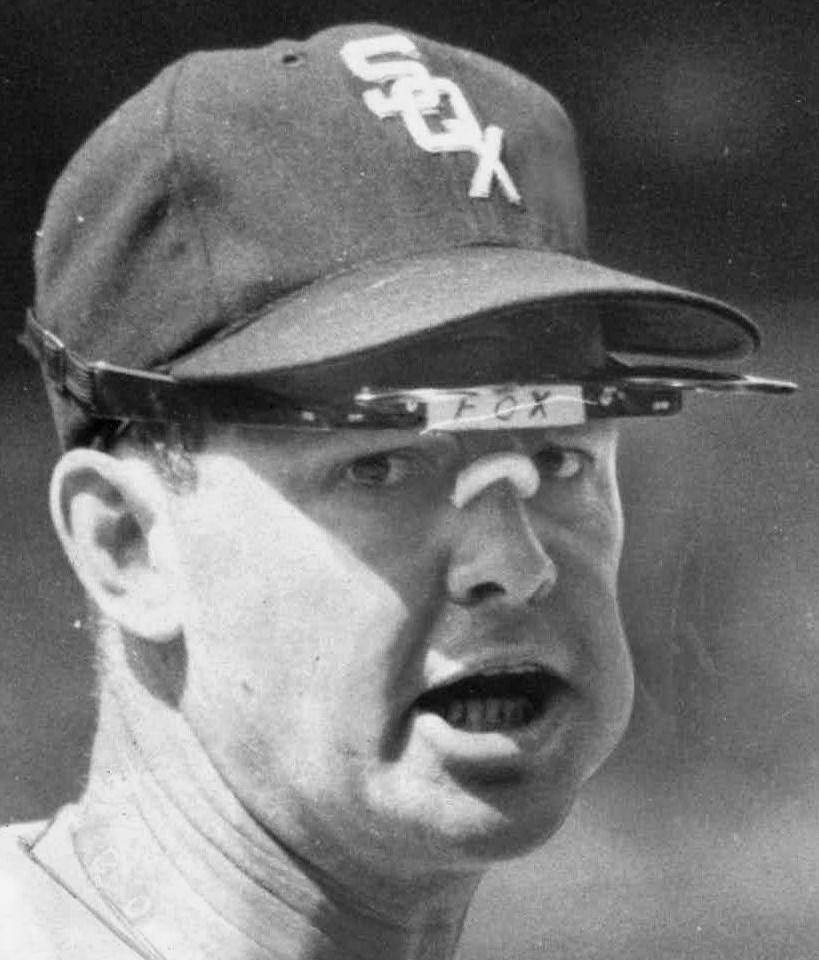
Nellie Fox holds the American League record.

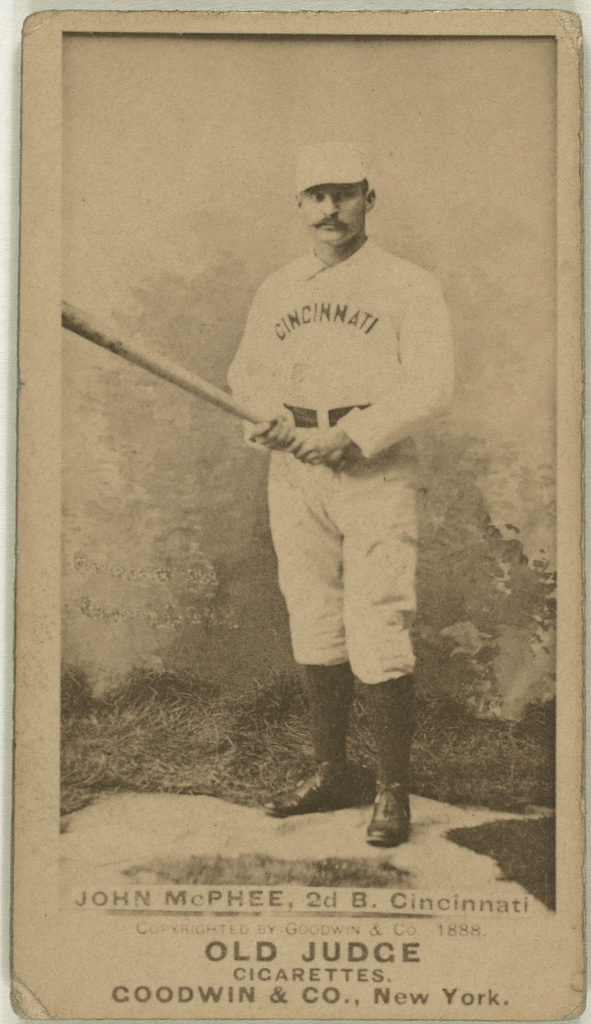
Bid McPhee held the major league record for 37 years, and led his league a record 11 times.

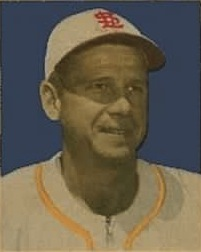
Jerry Priddy's 150 double plays in 1950 remain the American League record.

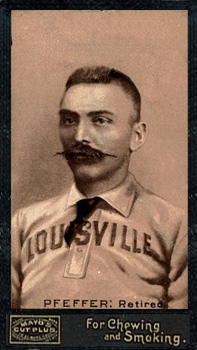
Fred Pfeffer held the National League record for 41 years.

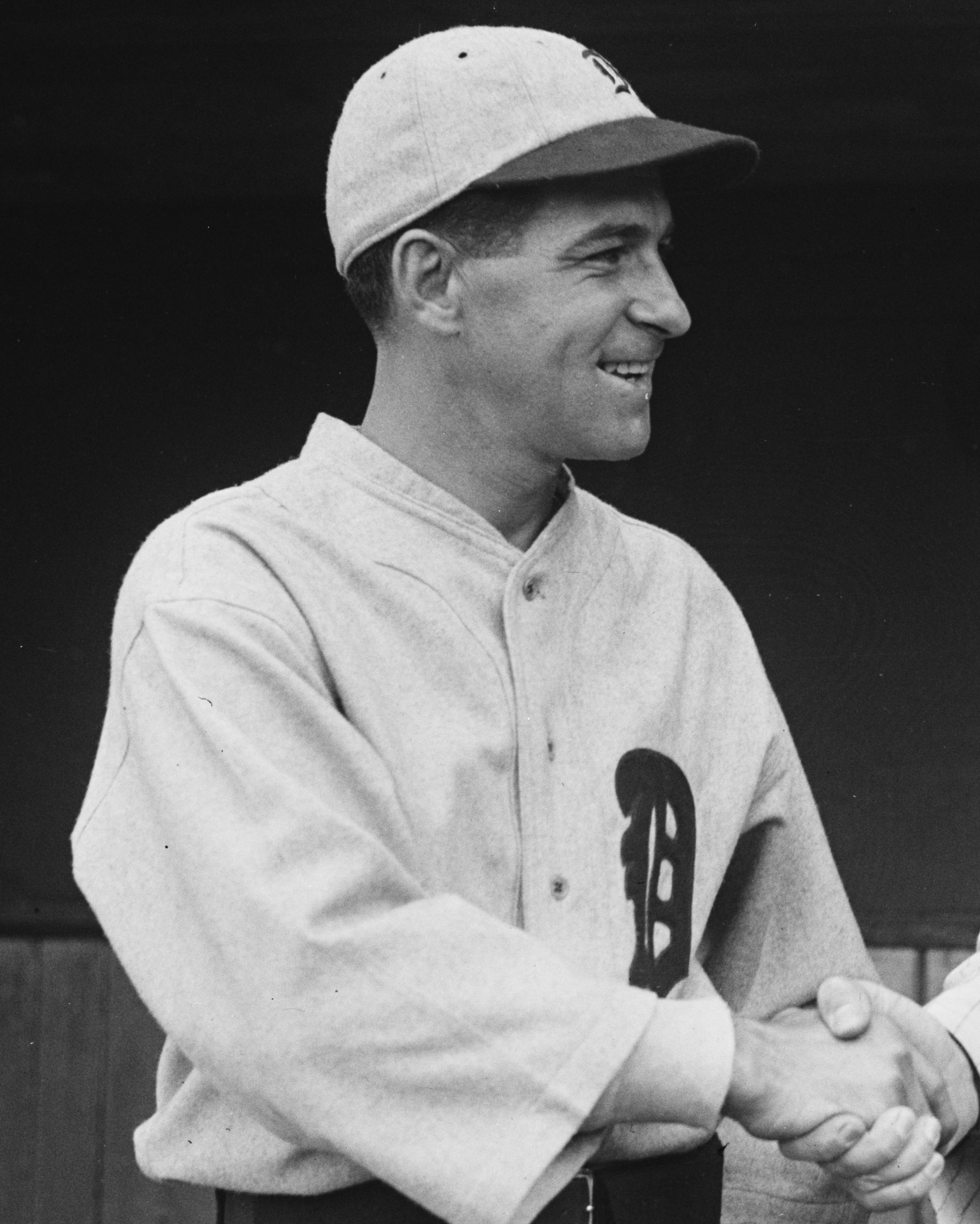
Bucky Harris posted the first season of 100 double plays by a second baseman in the 20th century, setting a new record three years in a row.

In baseball and softball, the second baseman is a fielding position in the infield, commonly stationed between second and first base. The second baseman often possesses quick hands and feet, needs the ability to get rid of the ball quickly, and must be able to make the pivot on a double play. In addition, second basemen are almost always right-handed. Only four left-handed throwing players have appeared as second basemen in the major leagues since 1950; one of the four, Gonzalo Márquez, was listed as the second baseman in the starting lineup for two games in 1973, batting in the first inning, but was replaced before his team took the field on defense, and none of the other three players lasted even a complete inning at the position. In the numbering system used to record defensive plays, the second baseman is assigned the number 4.

Second basemen typically record a double play by receiving a throw from another player to force out the runner advancing to second base, then throwing to first base to retire the batter/runner, or by fielding a ground ball and then either throwing to the shortstop covering second base or stepping on the base themselves before the throw to first base is made. Second basemen generally benefit in this respect from playing alongside an excellent shortstop with great range and quickness; strong middle infields are regarded as crucial to a team's defensive play, and double play totals are regarded as a strong indicator of their defensive skill. Double plays are also recorded when the second baseman catches a line drive, then throws to a base before the runner can tag up, or another infielder or the pitcher catches the line drive and then throws to the second baseman in the same situation; on occasion, the throw might come from an outfielder after an unexpected catch of a fly ball. Other double plays occur when the second baseman records an out at second base, then throws out a runner attempting to advance on the basepaths, or on a double steal attempt in which the catcher throws out a runner attempting to steal second base, and the second baseman throws back to the catcher to retire a runner trying to steal home. Double plays are also occasionally recorded when a rundown play is involved, almost always as the second out. Because of the high number of ground outs, second basemen and shortstops typically record far more double plays than players at any other position except first base.

Most of the career leaders are relatively recent players who have benefitted from improved infield defense, with equipment of better quality; 9 of the top 14 players made their major league debut after 1962, and only two were active before 1945. Longer careers have compensated for the fact that as strikeout totals have risen in baseball, the frequency of other defensive outs including ground outs has declined, with double play totals for second basemen likewise declining; 23 of the top 29 single-season totals were recorded between 1935 and 1974, and none of the top 362 were recorded before 1921. Bill Mazeroski holds the record for the most career double plays by a second baseman with 1,706. Nellie Fox is second with 1,619; only four other second basemen have recorded 1,500 career double plays.

- Stats updated as of September 27, 2026.

Rank	Player (2026 DPs)	Double plays as a second baseman			Other leagues, notes
Rank	Player (2026 DPs)	MLB	American League	National League	Other leagues, notes
1	Bill Mazeroski*	1,706	0	1,706	Holds the single-season record of 161 (set in 1966)
2	Nellie Fox*	1,619	1,568	51	Held major league record, 1963-1970
3	Willie Randolph	1,547	1,391	156	
4	Lou Whitaker	1,527	1,527	0	
5	Bobby Doerr*	1,507	1,507	0	Held major league record, 1951-1963
6	Joe Morgan*	1,505	62	1,443	
7	Charlie Gehringer*	1,444	1,444	0	Held major league record, 1938-1951
8	Robinson Canó	1,418	1,347	71	
9	Roberto Alomar*	1,407	1,001	406	
10	Frank White	1,382	1,382	0	
11	Red Schoendienst*	1,368	0	1,368	Held National League record, 1957–1967; held NL single-season record, 1954-1961 (tie)
12	Bobby Grich	1,302	1,302	0	
13	Ian Kinsler	1,291	1,255	36	
14	Jeff Kent*	1,261	3	1,258	
15	Eddie Collins*	1,239	1,239	0	Held major league record, 1926–1938; held American League record, 1922–1938; held AL single-season record, 1920-1921 (tie)
16	Ray Durham	1,189	746	443	
17	Bid McPhee*	1,188	0	657	Includes 531 in American Association; held major league record, 1889–1926; held single-season record, 1886–1921; held National League single-season record, 1892-1923
18	Billy Herman*	1,177	0	1,177	Held National League record, 1942-1957
19	Joe Gordon*	1,160	1,160	0	
20	Ryne Sandberg*	1,158	0	1,158	
21	Craig Biggio*	1,153	0	1,153	
22	Brandon Phillips	1,115	97	1,018	
23	Bret Boone	1,085	502	583	
24	**Jose Altuve (53)**	1,069	846	223	
25	Frankie Frisch*	1,062	0	1,062	Held National League record, 1933-1942
26	Luis Castillo	1,051	126	925	
27	Nap Lajoie*	1,050	883	167	Held American League single-season record, 1906-1921
28	Jim Gantner	1,036	1,036	0	
29	Frank Bolling	1,003	521	482	
30	Steve Sax	998	404	594	
31	Chase Utley	993	0	993	
32	Tom Herr	991	54	937	
33	Glenn Hubbard	975	94	881	
34	Manny Trillo	973	73	900	
35	Ski Melillo	965	965	0	
36	Buddy Myer	963	963	0	Held single-season record, 1935-1950
	Bobby Richardson	963	963	0	
38	Hughie Critz	960	0	960	
39	Cookie Rojas	953	518	435	
40	Tony Taylor	950	91	859	
41	Harold Reynolds	948	948	0	
42	Dustin Pedroia	940	940	0	
43	Julián Javier	907	0	907	
44	Jerry Priddy	906	906	0	Holds the American League single-season record (150 in 1950), was the major league record until 1966
45	Mark Ellis	903	703	200	
46	Dave Cash	901	0	901	
47	Rogers Hornsby*	895	10	885	Held National League record, 1929-1933
48	Fred Pfeffer	894	0	821	Includes 73 in Players' League; held National League record, 1888–1929; held single-season record, 1884–1886; held NL single-season record, 1884-1892
49	Robby Thompson	873	0	873	
50	Félix Millán	855	0	855	
51	Brian Roberts	850	850	0	
52	Del Pratt	849	849	0	
53	Orlando Hudson	841	407	434	
54	Ted Sizemore	835	31	804	
55	Don Blasingame	834	224	610	
	Chuck Knoblauch	834	834	0	
57	Tito Fuentes	832	119	713	
58	Johnny Temple	829	175	654	
59	Johnny Ray	828	263	565	
60	Mark McLemore	823	815	8	
61	Bucky Harris*	817	817	0	Held single-season record, 1921–1928; held American League single-season record, 1921-1935
62	Eddie Stanky	816	0	816	
63	Tony Cuccinello	812	2	810	Held single-season record, 1931–1935; held National League single-season record, 1931-1950
64	Davey Lopes	811	171	640	
65	Tony Lazzeri*	808	798	10	
66	Tommy Helms	807	0	807	
67	Ronnie Belliard	801	238	563	
68	Aaron Hill	800	539	261	
69	Eric Young	786	13	773	
70	Bobby Ávila	785	764	21	
71	Dan Uggla	784	0	784	
72	Julio Cruz	780	780	0	
73	Bobby Knoop	779	779	0	
	Fernando Viña	779	275	504	
75	Damion Easley	772	666	106	
76	Adam Kennedy	769	606	163	
77	Carlos Baerga	759	552	207	
	Davey Johnson	759	600	159	
79	Glenn Beckert	758	0	758	
80	Mark Grudzielanek	744	259	485	
	Jerry Remy	744	744	0	
82	Delino DeShields	743	100	643	
83	Bill Doran	742	5	737	
	**DJ LeMahieu (0)**	742	109	633	
85	**Rougned Odor (0)**	739	726	13	
86	Sandy Alomar	729	710	19	
87	Plácido Polanco	718	463	255	
88	Dick Green	712	712	0	
89	Larry Doyle	698	0	698	
90	Jim Gilliam	696	0	628	Includes 68 in Negro National League (second) (incomplete)
91	Horace Clarke	695	689	6	
92	Jonathan Schoop	691	674	17	
93	Jody Reed	690	449	241	
94	Brian Dozier	689	606	83	
	Johnny Evers*	689	1	688	
96	Rennie Stennett	687	0	687	
97	Ron Hunt	685	0	685	
98	Howie Kendrick	682	585	97	
99	Kolten Wong	670	21	649	
100	Mickey Morandini	669	28	641	

=== Third Basemen ===
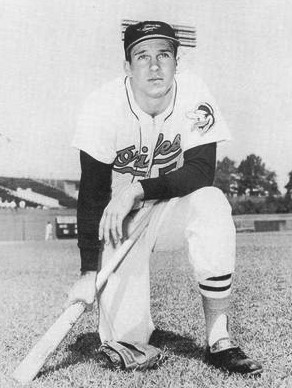
Brooks Robinson, the all-time leader in double plays by a third baseman.

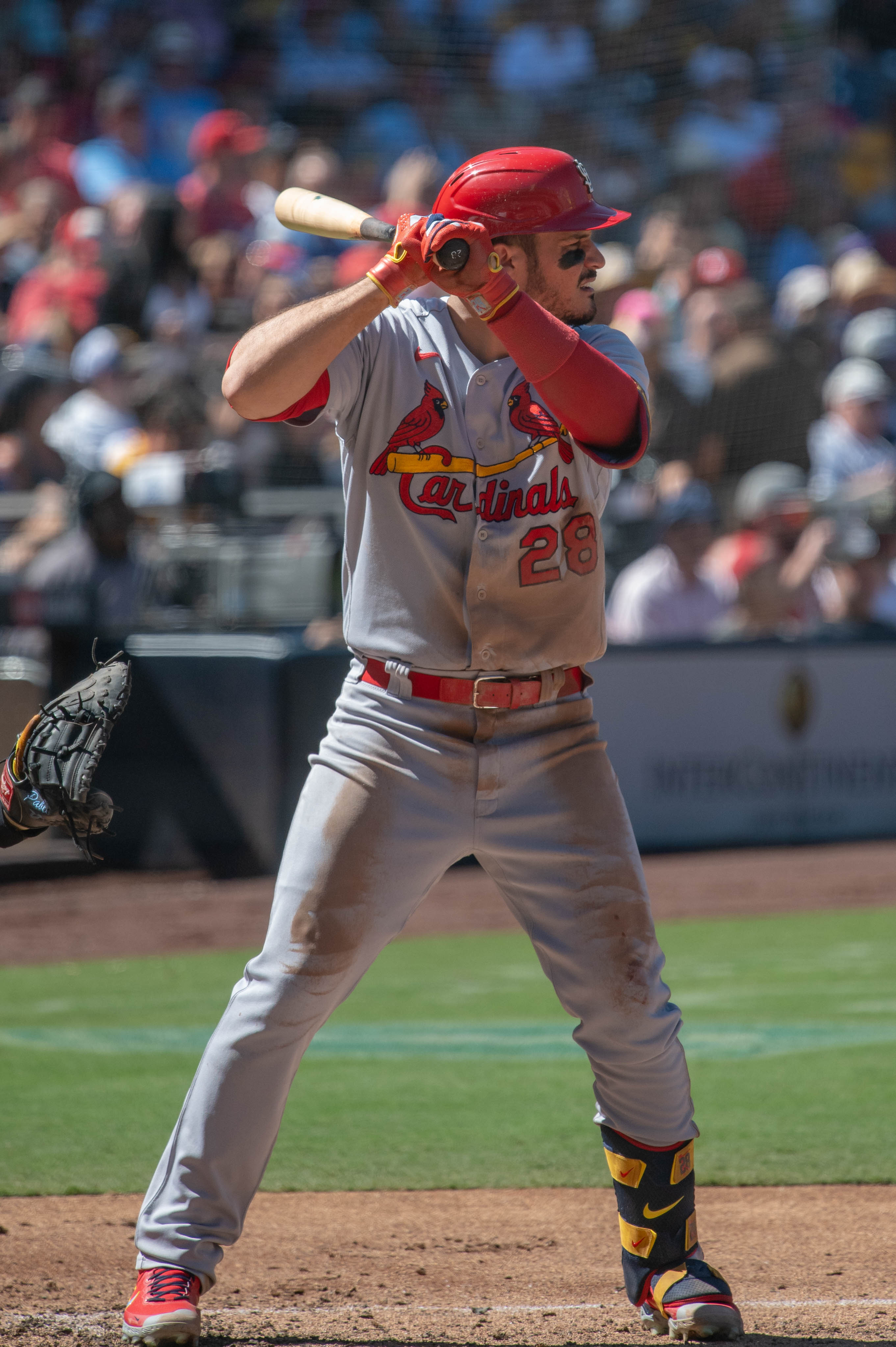
Nolan Arenado, the active leader and 3rd all-time in double plays by a third baseman.

Graig Nettles' 54 double plays in 1971 are the most by a third baseman.

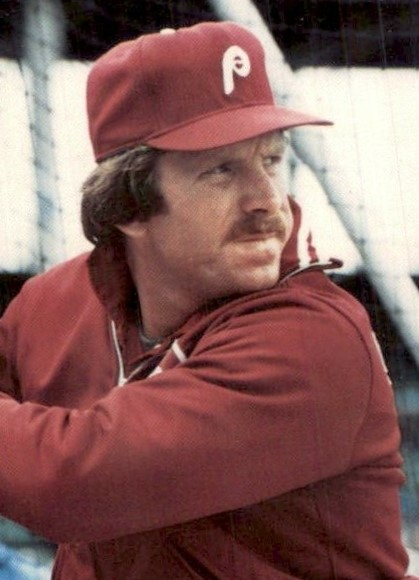
Mike Schmidt held the National League record for 40 years.

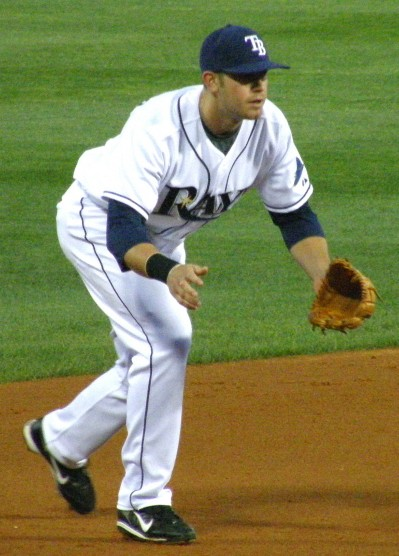
Evan Longoria has led the American League in double plays three times in his career.

Pie Traynor held the National League record for 31 years.

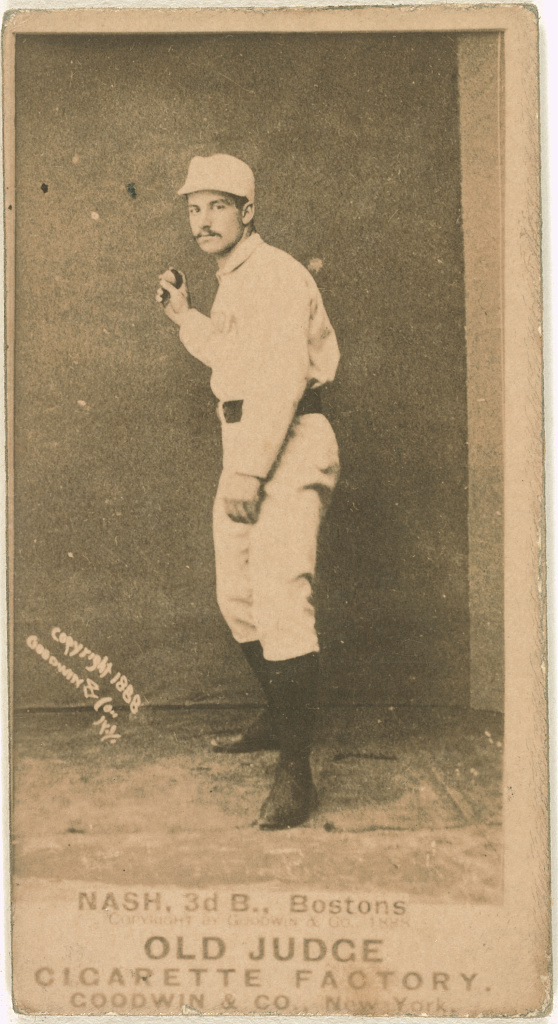
Billy Nash held the major league record for 27 years.

Most of the career leaders are relatively recent players who have benefitted from improved infield defense, with equipment of better quality; only six of the top 25 players made their major league debut before 1966, none of them before 1944. Only seven of the top 84 single-season totals were recorded before 1949, and only two of the top 152 were recorded before 1918. Brooks Robinson holds the record for the most career double plays by a third baseman with 618.

- Stats updated as of September 27, 2026.

Rank	Player (2026 DPs)	Double plays as a third baseman			Other leagues, notes
Rank	Player (2026 DPs)	MLB	American League	National League	Other leagues, notes
1	Brooks Robinson*	618	618	0	
2	Adrián Beltré*	523	355	168	
3	**Nolan Arenado (27)**	472	0	472	Holds National League record, 2026-present
4	Graig Nettles	470	418	52	Holds the single-season record of 54 (set in 1971)
5	Gary Gaetti	460	395	65	
6	Mike Schmidt*	450	0	450	Held National League record, 1986-2026
7	Buddy Bell	430	362	68	
8	Wade Boggs*	423	423	0	
9	Aurelio Rodriguez	408	396	12	
10	Ron Santo*	395	6	389	Held National League record, 1972-1986
11	Evan Longoria	390	303	87	
12	Eddie Mathews*	369	0	369	Held major league record, 1966-1968; held National League record, 1964-1972
13	Robin Ventura	359	269	90	
14	Ken Boyer	355	5	350	
	Scott Rolen*	355	30	325	
16	**Manny Machado (19)**	352	164	188	
17	Kyle Seager	351	351	0	
18	Sal Bando	345	345	0	
	Eddie Yost	345	345	0	Held major league record, 1959-1966; held American League record, 1959-1967
20	Vinny Castilla	331	25	306	
	Doug DeCinces	331	331	0	
22	Tim Wallach	319	4	315	
23	Clete Boyer	315	223	92	
	Ron Cey	315	1	314	
	Matt Williams	315	21	294	
26	Terry Pendleton	312	2	310	
27	Harlond Clift	309	309	0	Held major league record, 1945-1959; held the single-season record, 1937-1971
28	**Matt Chapman (21)**	308	223	85	
29	George Brett*	307	307	0	
30	George Kell*	306	306	0	
	Ken Keltner	306	306	0	
32	Pie Traynor*	303	0	303	Held major league record, 1933-1945; held National League record, 1933-1964; held single-season record, 1925-1927; held NL single-season record, 1925-1950
33	Mike Lowell	302	109	193	
34	Willie Kamm	299	299	0	Held American League record, 1933-1945
35	Frank Malzone	289	289	0	
36	Pinky Higgins	288	288	0	
37	Aramis Ramírez	287	0	287	
38	Ken Caminiti	280	10	270	
39	Heinie Groh	277	0	277	Held major league record, 1924-1933; held National League record, 1922-1933; held NL single-season record, 1915-1925
40	Jeff Cirillo	276	110	166	Holds the National League single-season record (45 in 1998; tie)
	Chipper Jones*	276	0	276	
42	Willie Jones	273	2	271	
43	Darrell Evans	270	2	268	Holds the National League single-season record (45 in 1974)
44	Ossie Bluege	266	266	0	
	Billy Nash	266	0	221	Includes 37 in Players' League, 8 in American Association; held major league record, 1897-1924; held single-season record, 1890-1925
46	Eric Chavez	262	254	8	
47	Larry Gardner	261	261	0	Held American League record, 1923-1933; held the single-season record, 1920-1925 (tie)
48	Home Run Baker*	260	260	0	Held American League record, 1918-1924; held AL single-season record, 1910-1925
49	Ken McMullen	258	248	10	
50	Carney Lansford	256	256	0	
	Doug Rader	256	2	254	
52	Stan Hack	255	0	255	
53	Arlie Latham	253	0	118	Includes 126 in American Association, 9 in the Players' League; held major league record, 1890-1897
54	Bob Elliott	252	21	231	
55	**Eugenio Suárez (8)**	246	51	195	
56	Josh Donaldson	245	203	42	
57	Troy Glaus	243	190	53	
58	Todd Zeile	238	47	191	
59	**Alex Bregman (30)**	237	207	30	
	David Wright	237	0	237	
61	**José Ramírez (15)**	232	232	0	
62	Charlie Hayes	231	52	179	
63	Travis Fryman	230	230	0	
64	Ryan Zimmerman	229	0	229	
65	Jimmy Austin	228	228	0	Held American League record, 1916-1918
66	Don Hoak	227	0	227	
67	Jimmy Collins*	225	113	112	
68	Richie Hebner	224	10	214	
	Brandon Inge	224	222	2	
	Don Money	224	153	71	
71	Eddie Foster	220	220	0	
72	Ken Reitz	219	0	219	
	Pinky Whitney	219	0	219	
74	Joe Randa	218	165	53	
75	Billy Shindle	215	0	164	Includes 51 in American Association
76	Billy Werber	214	114	100	
77	Lave Cross	212	71	139	Includes 2 in American Association; held National League single-season record, 1899-1915
78	Alex Rodriguez	205	205	0	
79	Bob Bailey	203	0	203	
80	Bill Madlock	200	2	198	
81	Todd Frazier	199	74	125	
	Milt Stock	199	0	199	
83	Mike Moustakas	196	162	34	
84	Andy Carey	194	190	4	
	Mike Pagliarulo	194	175	19	
86	Hank Majeski	192	171	21	
87	Bill Mueller	190	57	133	
88	Kevin Seitzer	189	189	0	
89	Joe Crede	188	188	0	
	Jimmy Dykes	188	188	0	
91	**Anthony Rendon (0)**	186	41	145	
92	Paul Molitor*	185	185	0	
93	Steve Buechele	184	123	61	
	Bill Melton	184	184	0	
	Red Rolfe	184	184	0	
96	David Freese	183	31	152	
97	Bill Bradley	182	160	18	Includes 4 in Federal League; held American League single-season record, 1901-1902 (tie)
98	Ken Oberkfell	180	0	180	
99	Jim Tabor	178	153	25	
100	Pedro Feliz	177	0	177	
	Toby Harrah	177	177	0	

=== Shortstop ===
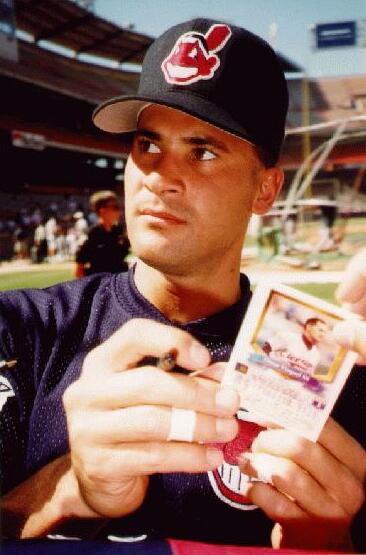
Omar Vizquel, the all-time leader in double plays by a shortstop.

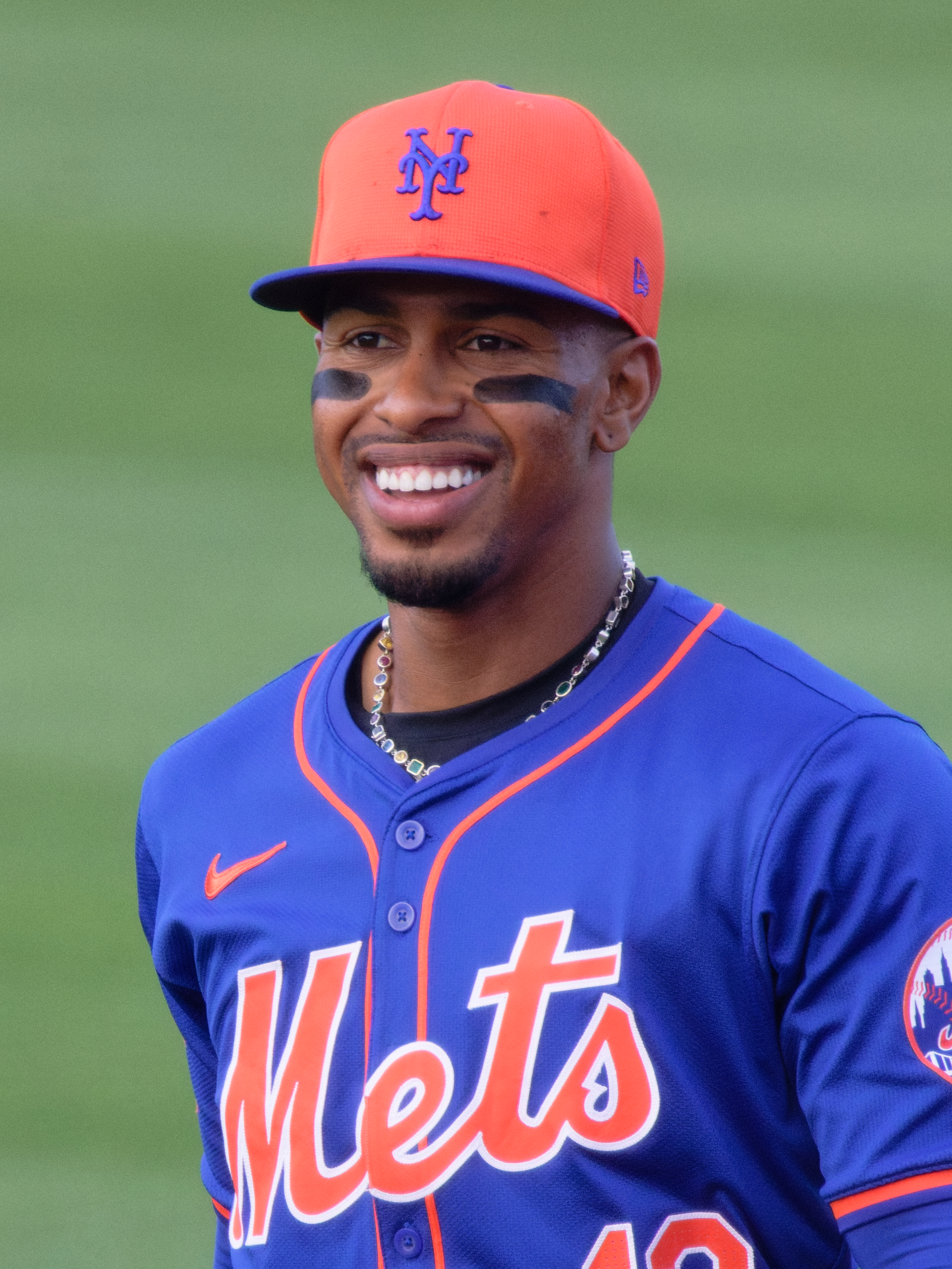
Francisco Lindor, the active leader and 62nd all-time in double plays by a shortstop.

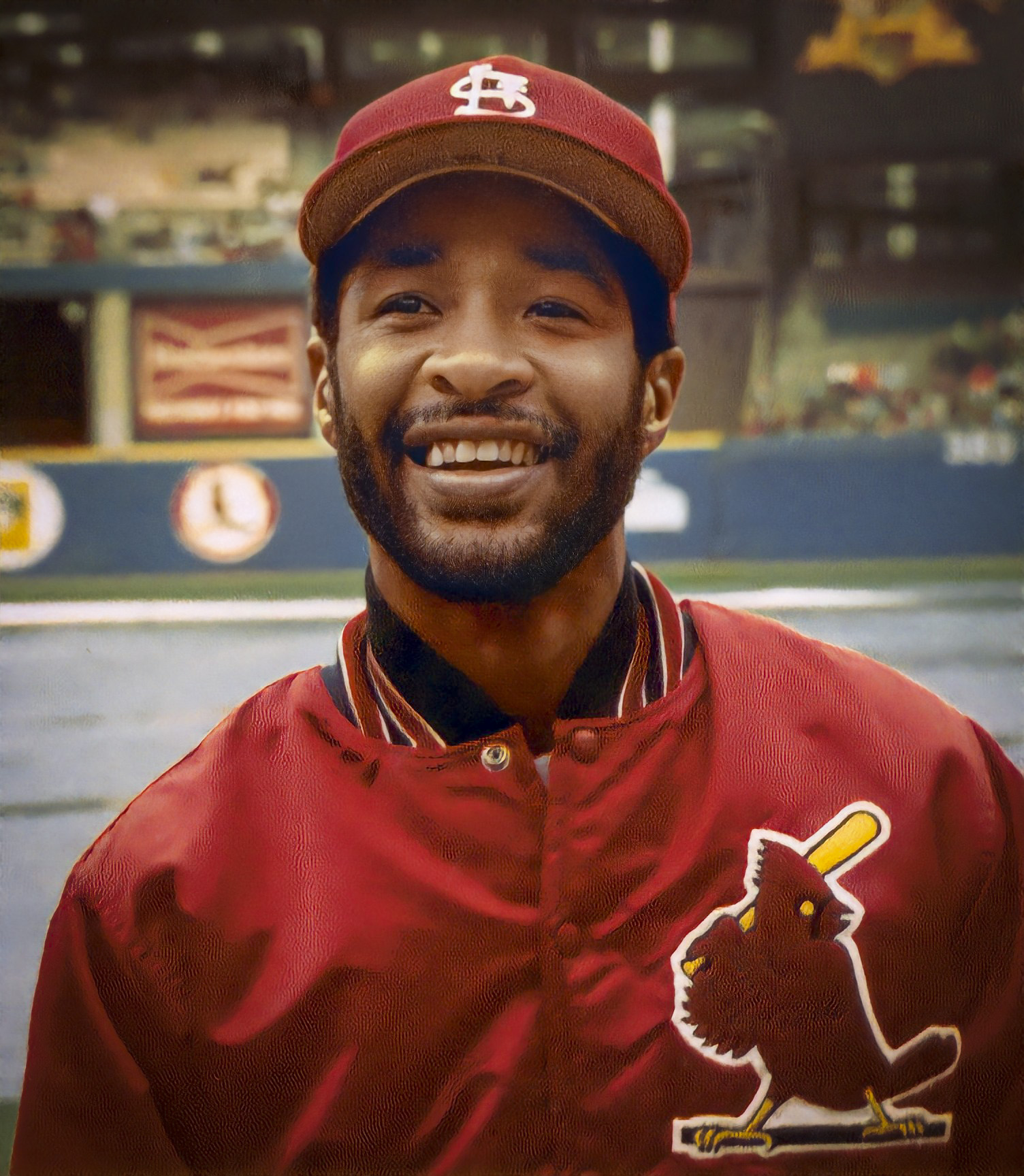
Ozzie Smith holds the National League record.

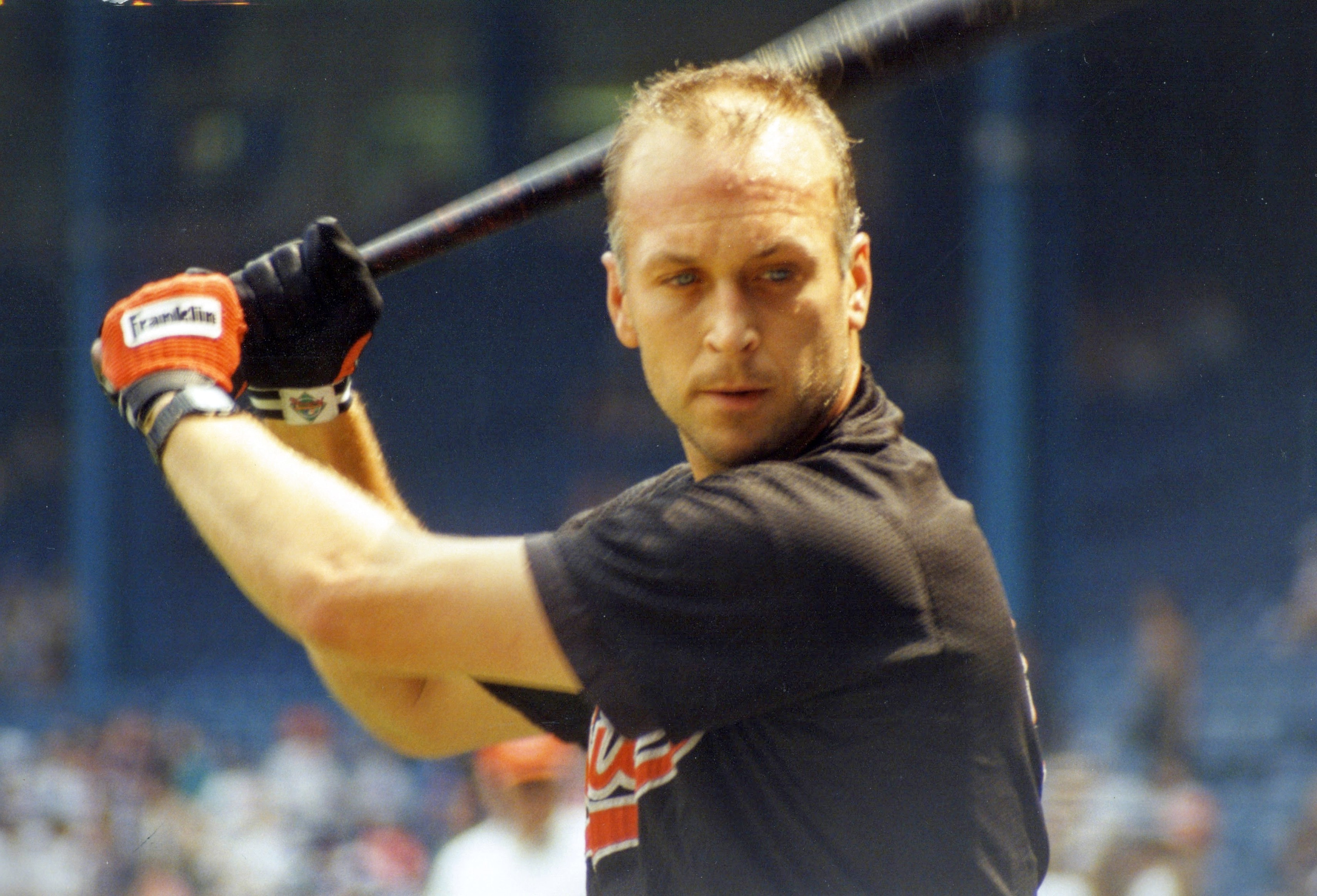
Cal Ripken Jr. holds the American League record, and led the AL in double plays a record eight times.

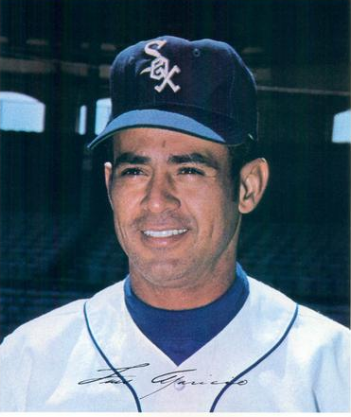
Luis Aparicio held the major league record for 24 years.

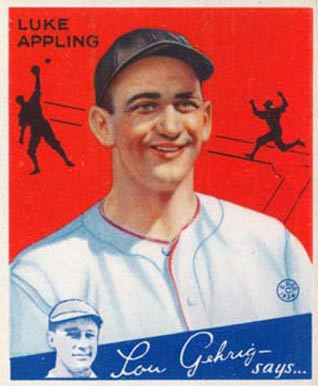
Luke Appling held the major league record for 24 years.

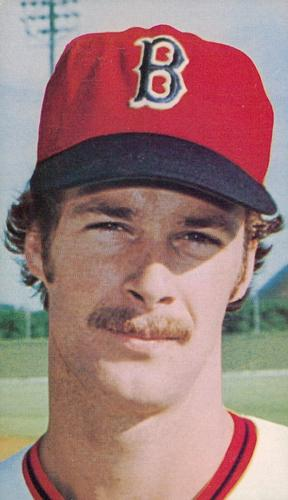
Rick Burleson's 147 double plays in 1980 remain the record for shortstops.

Shortstop, abbreviated SS, is a baseball or softball fielding position in the infield, commonly stationed between second and third base, which is considered to be among the most demanding defensive positions. The position is mostly filled by defensive specialists, so shortstops are generally relatively poor batters who typically hit lower in the batting order. In the numbering system used to record defensive plays, the shortstop is assigned the number 6.

Shortstops typically record a double play by fielding a ground ball and then either throwing to the second baseman to force out the runner advancing to second base, or stepping on the base themselves before throwing to first base to retire the batter/runner, or by receiving a throw from another player to force a runner at second base before the throw to first base is made. Shortstops generally benefit in this respect from playing alongside an excellent second baseman with great range and quickness; strong middle infields are regarded as crucial to a team's defensive play, and double play totals are regarded as a strong indicator of their defensive skill. Double plays are also recorded when the shortstop catches a line drive, then throws to a base before the runner can tag up, or another infielder or the pitcher catches the line drive and then throws to the shortstop in the same situation; on occasion, the throw might come from an outfielder after an unexpected catch of a fly ball. Other double plays occur when the shortstop records an out at second base, then throws out a runner attempting to advance on the basepaths, or on a double steal attempt in which the catcher throws out a runner attempting to steal second base, and the shortstop throws back to the catcher to retire a runner trying to steal home. Double plays are also occasionally recorded when a rundown play is involved, almost always as the second out. Because of the high number of ground outs, shortstops and second basemen typically record far more double plays than players at any other position except first base.

Most of the career leaders are relatively recent players who have benefitted from improved infield defense, with equipment of better quality; nine of the top twelve players made their major league debut after 1969, and only one was active before 1951. Five of the top nine players spent their entire careers with one team. Longer careers have compensated for the fact that as strikeout totals have risen in baseball, the frequency of other defensive outs including ground outs has declined, with double play totals for shortstops likewise declining; 18 of the top 25 single-season totals were recorded between 1944 and 1988, and none of the top 478 were recorded before 1920. Omar Vizquel holds the record for the most career double plays by a shortstop with 1,734. Only three other shortstops have recorded 1,500 career double plays.

- Stats updated as of September 27, 2026.

Rank	Player (2026 DPs)	Double plays as a shortstop			Other leagues, notes
Rank	Player (2026 DPs)	MLB	American League	National League	Other leagues, notes
1	Omar Vizquel	1,734	1,433	301	
2	Ozzie Smith*	1,590	0	1,590	Held major league record, 1995-2007
3	Cal Ripken Jr.*	1,565	1,565	0	
4	Luis Aparicio*	1,553	1,553	0	Held major league record, 1971-1995; held American League record, 1971-1996
5	Luke Appling*	1,424	1,424	0	Held major league record, 1947-1971; held American League record, 1946-1971; held AL single-season record, 1936-1938
6	Derek Jeter*	1,408	1,408	0	
7	Alan Trammell*	1,307	1,307	0	
8	Roy McMillan	1,304	0	1,304	Held National League record, 1965-1992; held NL single-season record, 1954-1970
9	Dave Concepción	1,290	0	1,290	
10	Miguel Tejada	1,274	1,020	254	
11	Larry Bowa	1,265	0	1,265	
12	Jimmy Rollins	1,249	18	1,231	
13	Pee Wee Reese*	1,246	0	1,246	Held National League record, 1956-1965
14	Dick Groat	1,237	0	1,237	
15	Royce Clayton	1,224	387	837	
16	Édgar Rentería	1,218	181	1,037	
17	Phil Rizzuto*	1,217	1,217	0	
18	Elvis Andrus	1,209	1,209	0	
19	Rabbit Maranville*	1,188	0	1,188	Held major league record, 1930-1947; held National League record, 1930-1956; held single-season record, 1914-1920
20	Bert Campaneris	1,186	1,186	0	
21	Lou Boudreau*	1,180	1,180	0	Held single-season record, 1944-1970; held American League single-season record, 1943-1979
22	Don Kessinger	1,170	89	1,081	
23	Joe Cronin*	1,165	1,164	1	Held American League record, 1939-1946
24	Garry Templeton	1,164	0	1,164	
25	Orlando Cabrera	1,123	507	616	
26	Ozzie Guillén	1,094	1,040	54	
27	Barry Larkin*	1,092	0	1,092	
28	Dick Bartell	1,072	76	996	
29	Mike Bordick	1,055	1,031	24	
30	Mark Belanger	1,054	1,050	4	
31	Alfredo Griffin	1,053	832	221	
32	Chris Speier	1,043	6	1,037	
33	Leo Cárdenas	1,036	426	610	
34	Tim Foli	1,028	155	873	
35	Álex González (b.1977)	1,025	157	868	
36	Dave Bancroft*	1,021	0	1,021	Held major league record, 1928-1930; held National League record, 1927-1930; held single-season record, 1920-1925
37	Rafael Furcal	1,020	0	1,020	
38	Ed Brinkman	1,005	990	15	
39	Freddie Patek	1,004	858	146	
40	Marty Marion	978	41	937	
41	Greg Gagne	967	826	141	
42	Roger Peckinpaugh	966	966	0	Held major league record, 1925-1928; held American League record, 1921-1939; held single-season record, 1923-1925 (tie); held AL single-season record, 1917-1921, 1923-1933
43	J. J. Hardy	953	646	307	
44	Eddie Miller	946	0	946	
45	Frankie Crosetti	944	944	0	Held American League single-season record, 1938-1943
46	Tony Fernández	943	770	173	
47	Robin Yount*	941	941	0	
48	Alvin Dark	933	0	933	
49	Brandon Crawford	932	0	932	
50	Billy Jurges	929	0	929	
51	Eddie Joost	928	709	219	
52	Jhonny Peralta	920	728	192	
53	Jack Wilson	913	60	853	
54	José Reyes	911	164	747	
55	Bill Russell	909	0	909	
56	Dick Schofield	900	819	81	
57	Leo Durocher*	895	70	825	
58	Johnny Logan	894	0	894	
59	Bill Dahlen	881	0	881	Held major league record, 1908-1925; held National League record, 1906-1927; held single-season record, 1898-1914
60	Jay Bell	877	161	716	
61	Troy Tulowitzki	871	139	732	
62	**Francisco Lindor (43)**	862	434	428	
63	Maury Wills	859	0	859	
64	Walt Weiss	854	286	568	
65	Alex Rodriguez	853	853	0	
	Vern Stephens	853	853	0	
67	Tommy Corcoran	851	0	759	Includes 56 in American Association, 36 in Players' League; held major league record, 1905-1908
68	Arky Vaughan*	850	0	850	
69	Rafael Ramírez	842	0	842	
69	Bucky Dent	839	839	0	
71	Jim Fregosi	836	820	16	
72	José Valentín	830	722	108	
73	Alex Gonzalez (b.1973)	829	604	225	
74	Rick Burleson	827	827	0	Holds the single-season record of 147 (set in 1980)
75	Travis Jackson*	826	0	826	
76	Alcides Escobar	825	696	129	
77	**Xander Bogaerts (77)**	815	613	202	
78	Alexei Ramírez	807	731	76	
79	Billy Rogell	805	803	2	Held American League single-season record, 1933-1936
80	Neifi Pérez	796	159	637	
81	Andrelton Simmons	783	428	355	
82	Chico Carrasquel	770	770	0	
83	Honus Wagner*	766	0	766	
84	Herman Long	765	18	692	Includes 55 in American Association; held major league record, 1900-1905; held National League record, 1901-1906
85	Wally Gerber	764	748	16	
86	Cristian Guzmán	762	490	272	
87	Erick Aybar	758	649	109	
88	Bud Harrelson	751	57	694	
89	Deivi Cruz	738	581	157	
90	Zoilo Versalles	727	654	73	
91	Everett Scott	726	726	0	Held American League single-season record, 1921-1923
92	Ernie Banks*	724	0	724	
93	Spike Owen	723	498	225	
94	Ron Hansen	722	722	0	
95	Gene Alley	709	0	709	
96	Rich Aurilia	708	39	669	
	Shawon Dunston	708	3	705	
98	Roy Smalley	702	702	0	Held single-season record, 1979-1980
99	Iván DeJesús	700	4	696	
100	Bobby Wine	698	0	698	Holds the National League single-season record of 137 (set in 1970), was the major league record until 1979.

=== Left Fielders ===
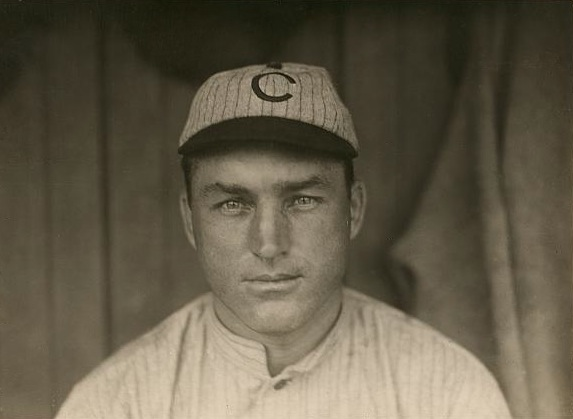
Jimmy Sheckard, the all-time leader in double plays by a left fielder.

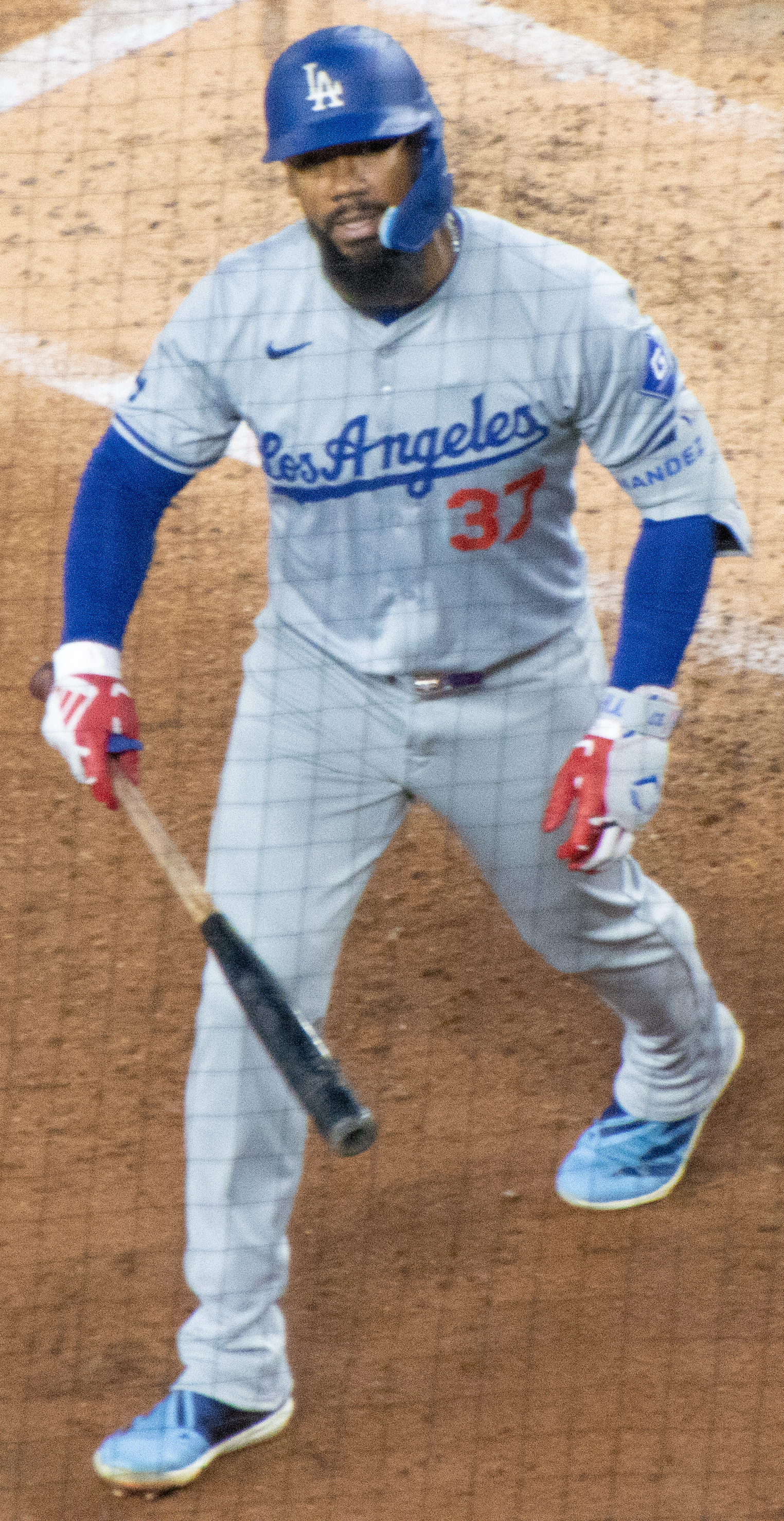
Teoscar Hernández, the active leader and tied for 124th all-time in double plays by a left fielder.

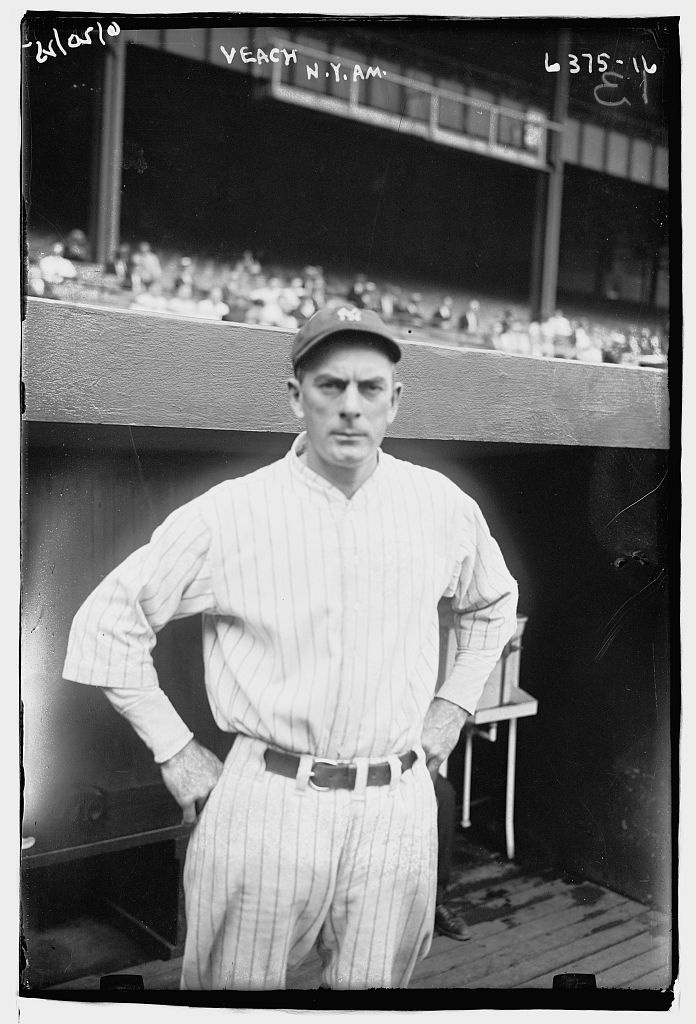
Bobby Veach holds the American League record.

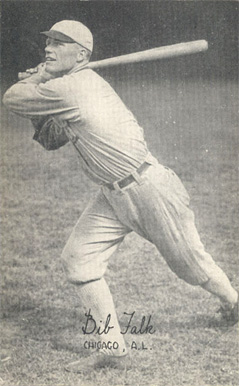
Bibb Falk holds the AL single-season record for the last 96 years.

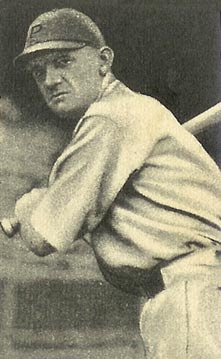
Max Carey hold two records as a left fielder.

The left fielder (LF) is one of the three outfielders, the defensive positions in baseball farthest from the batter. Left field is the area of the outfield to the left of a person standing at home plate and facing toward the pitcher's mound. The outfielders have to try to catch long fly balls before they hit the ground or to quickly catch or retrieve and return to the infield any other balls entering the outfield. The left fielder must also be adept at navigating the area of left field where the foul line approaches the corner of the playing field and the walls of the seating areas. Being the outfielder closest to third base, the left fielder generally does not have to throw as far as the other outfielders to throw out runners advancing around the bases, so they often do not have the strongest throwing arm, but their throws need to be accurate. The left fielder normally plays behind the third baseman and shortstop, who play in or near the infield; unlike catchers and most infielders (excepting first basemen), who are virtually exclusively right-handed, left fielders can be either right- or left-handed. In the scoring system used to record defensive plays, the left fielder is assigned the number 7.

Left fielders are most commonly credited with a double play when they throw the ball to an infielder who tags a runner attempting to advance on the basepaths, even on a caught fly ball that results in an out (see tag up); of special importance are throws to the catcher if the runner is trying to reach home plate to score a run, perhaps on a sacrifice fly. Left fielders will often record assists by throwing out runners who try to advance farther than the batter, such as going from first to third base on a single, or batter/runners who try to stretch a hit into a longer one. Outfielders also earn double plays on relay throws to infielders after particularly deep fly balls, by throwing to a base to record an out on an appeal play, or in situations where they might deflect a fly ball before another defensive player makes the catch; in extraordinary instances, right fielders have occasionally recorded double plays by throwing out batters at first base after fielding uncaught line drives that reached them quickly. Outfielders record far fewer double plays than other players due to the difficulty of making an accurate throw in time to retire a runner from a great distance; middle infielders routinely record more double plays in a single season than outfielders do in their entire careers. Double plays are an important statistic for outfielders, giving a greater indication of a left fielder's throwing arm than double plays by infielders do. In recent years, some sabermetricians have begun referring to assists by outfielders as baserunner kills.

Jimmy Sheckard is the all-time leader in career double plays as a left fielder with 58. Zack Wheat (50) is the only other left fielder who has recorded 50 career double plays. Teoscar Hernández, who had 9 double plays through the end of the 2026 season to place him tied for 124th all-time, is the leader among active players.

- Stats updated as of the 2026 season.

Rank	Player (2027 DPs)	Double plays as a left fielder			Other leagues, notes
Rank	Player (2027 DPs)	MLB	American League	National League	Other leagues, notes
1	Jimmy Sheckard †	58	0	58	Held National League single-season record, 1911–1912; held the single-season record, 1911–1912
2	Zack Wheat*	50	1	49	
3	Bobby Veach	42	42	0	
4	Bibb Falk	36	36	0	Holds AL single-season record (9 in 1927)
5	Jack Graney	35	35	0	
	Duffy Lewis	35	35	0	
	Ken Williams	35	31	4	
8	Goose Goslin*	34	34	0	
9	Sherry Magee	33	0	33	
10	George Burns	30	0	30	
	Max Carey*	30	0	30	Holds National League single-season record (11 in 1912) (tie); Holds the single-season record (11 in 1912) (tie)
	Alfonso Soriano	30	2	28	
13	Charlie Jamieson	29	29	0	
14	Bob Johnson	28	28	0	
15	Fred Clarke* †	27	0	27	
	Ted Williams*	27	27	0	
	Carl Yastrzemski*	27	27	0	
18	Carson Bigbee	26	0	26	
19	Matty McIntyre	25	25	0	
20	Joe Medwick *	24	0	24	
	Al Simmons*	24	22	2	
22	Rube Ellis	23	0	23	Held National League single-season record, 1909–1911; held the single-season record, 1909–1911
	George Stone	23	23	0	
	Joe Vosmik	23	23	0	
25	Bob Bescher	22	0	22	
	Barry Bonds	22	0	22	
	Topsy Hartsel †	22	19	3	
	Babe Ruth*	22	22	0	
	Howie Shanks	22	22	0	
30	Patsy Dougherty	21	21	0	
	Minnie Miñoso*	21	21	0	Negro League totals unavailable
	Tim Raines*	21	9	12	
33	Del Ennis	20	0	20	
	George Foster	20	0	20	
	Bernard Gilkey	20	0	20	
	Heinie Manush*	20	1	19	
37	Rickey Henderson*	19	16	3	
	Burt Shotton	19	16	3	
	Jimmy Slagle	19	0	19	
40	Lou Brock*	18	0	18	
	Jeff Heath	18	17	1	
	Geoff Jenkins	18	0	18	
	Billy Williams*	18	0	18	
44	Jesse Burkett* †	17	8	9	
	José Cruz	17	0	17	
	Dan Gladden	17	17	0	
	Luis Gonzalez	17	0	17	
	Jim Rice*	17	17	0	
	Hank Sauer	17	0	17	
	Riggs Stephenson	17	0	17	
	Tillie Walker	17	17	0	
52	Augie Galan	16	0	16	
	Shoeless Joe Jackson	16	16	0	
	Gary Ward	16	16	0	
55	Mike Greenwell	15	15	0	
	Les Mann	15	0	13	Includes 2 in Federal League
	Jo-Jo Moore	15	0	15	
	Rick Reichardt	15	15	0	
	Lonnie Smith	15	4	11	
	Moose Solters	15	15	0	
61	Vince Coleman	14	5	9	
	Alex Gordon	14	14	0	
	Bobby Higginson	14	14	0	
	Raúl Ibañez	14	13	1	
	Gary Matthews	14	0	14	
	Jack McCarthy	14	10	4	
	Irish Meusel	14	0	14	
	Lou Piniella	14	14	0	
	John Stone	14	14	0	
	Gus Zernial	14	14	0	
71	Dusty Baker	13	0	13	
	Albert Belle	13	13	0	
	Tommy Davis	13	3	10	
	Chick Hafey*	13	0	13	
	Steve Henderson	13	3	10	
	Matt Holliday	13	1	12	
	Ralph Kiner*	13	0	13	
	Carlos Lee	13	4	9	
	Kevin McReynolds	13	0	13	
	Sam Mertes †	13	5	8	
	Rube Oldring	13	13	0	
	Luis Polonia	13	13	0	
	Gee Walker	13	11	2	
	Roy White	13	13	0	
	Gene Woodling	13	13	0	
86	Garret Anderson	12	12	0	
	Dante Bichette	12	3	9	
	Pat Duncan	12	0	12	
	Bill Lamar	12	12	0	
	Austin McHenry	12	0	12	
	Mike Menosky	12	12	0	
	Ward Miller	12	1	5	Includes 6 in Federal League
	Rip Radcliff	12	12	0	
	Kip Selbach	12	10	2	
	Spike Shannon	12	0	12	
	Willie Stargell*	12	0	12	
	Shannon Stewart	12	12	0	
	B.J. Surhoff	12	12	0	
99	Michael Brantley	11	11	0	
	Pat Burrell	11	0	11	

=== Center Fielders ===
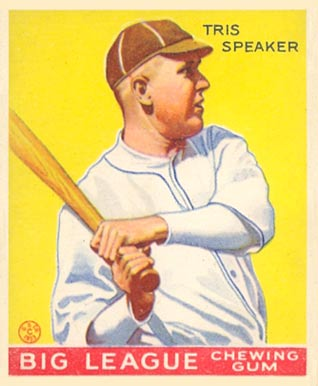
Tris Speaker, the all-time leader in double plays by a center fielder.

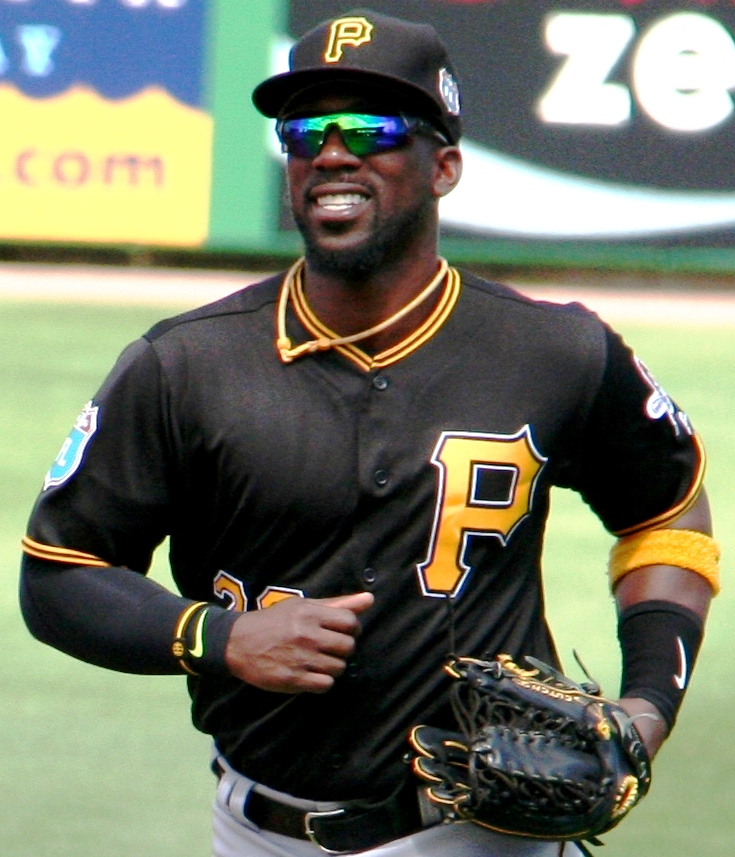
Andrew McCuthcen, the active leader in double plays by a center fielder and tied for 113th all-time.

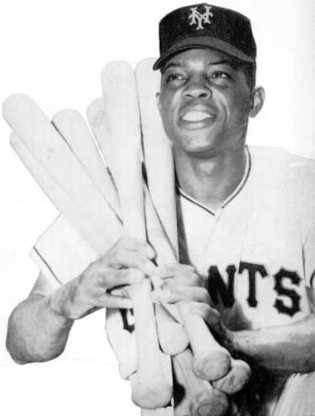
Willie Mays holds the National League record.

The center fielder (CF) is one of the three outfielders, the defensive positions in baseball farthest from the batter. Center field is the area of the outfield directly in front of a person standing at home plate and facing beyond the pitcher's mound. The outfielders' duty is to try to catch long fly balls before they hit the ground or to quickly catch or retrieve and return to the infield any other balls entering the outfield. Generally having the most territory to cover, the center fielder is usually the fastest of the three outfielders, although this can also depend on the relative strength of their throwing arms and the configuration of their home field, due to the deepest part of center field being the farthest point from the infield and home plate. The center fielder normally plays behind the shortstop and second baseman, who play in or near the infield; unlike catchers and most infielders (excepting first basemen), who are virtually exclusively right-handed, center fielders can be either right- or left-handed. In the scoring system used to record defensive plays, the center fielder is assigned the number 8.

Center fielders are most commonly credited with a double play when they throw the ball to an infielder who tags a runner attempting to advance on the basepaths, even on a caught fly ball that results in an out (see tag up); of special importance are throws to the catcher if the runner is trying to reach home plate to score a run, perhaps on a sacrifice fly. Left fielders will often record assists by throwing out runners who try to advance farther than the batter, such as going from first to third base on a single, or batter/runners who try to stretch a hit into a longer one. Outfielders also earn double plays on relay throws to infielders after particularly deep fly balls, by throwing to a base to record an out on an appeal play, or in situations where they might deflect a fly ball before another defensive player makes the catch; in extraordinary instances, right fielders have occasionally recorded double plays by throwing out batters at first base after fielding uncaught line drives that reached them quickly. Outfielders record far fewer double plays than other players due to the difficulty of making an accurate throw in time to retire a runner from a great distance; middle infielders routinely record more double plays in a single season than outfielders do in their entire careers. Double plays are an important statistic for outfielders, giving a greater indication of a left fielder's throwing arm than double plays by infielders do. In recent years, some sabermetricians have begun referring to assists by outfielders as baserunner kills.

Tris Speaker is the all-time leader in career double plays as a center fielder with 146; he is the only player to record more than 100 career double plays as a center fielder. Speaker played a particularly shallow center field and six of his double plays were unassisted, which is the record for outfielders. Andrew McCutchen, who had 16 double plays of the end of the 2026 season to place him tied for 113th all-time, is the leader among active players.

- Stats updated as of the 2026 season.

Rank	Player (2027 DPs)	Double plays as a center fielder			Other leagues, notes
Rank	Player (2027 DPs)	MLB	American League	National League	Other leagues, notes
1	Tris Speaker*	146	146	0	
2	Ty Cobb*	77	77	0	
3	Willie Mays*	59	0	59	
4	Max Carey*	58	0	58	
5	Clyde Milan	55	55	0	
6	Dode Paskert	48	0	48	
7	Cy Seymour †	46	0	46	
8	Ginger Beaumont †	44	0	44	
	Sam West	44	44	0	
10	Ken Griffey Jr.*	41	35	6	
	Edd Roush*	41	0	37	Includes 4 in Federal League
12	Fielder Jones †	40	40	0	
	Tommy Leach †	40	0	40	
14	Richie Ashburn*	39	0	39	
	Happy Felsch	39	39	0	
16	Steve Finley	37	0	37	
17	Hy Myers	36	0	36	
18	Joe Birmingham	35	35	0	
	Doc Cramer	35	35	0	
	Vince DiMaggio	35	0	35	
	Amos Otis	35	34	1	
22	Roy Thomas †	34	0	34	
23	Kenny Lofton	33	30	3	
24	Bill Bruton	31	9	22	
	Jim Edmonds	31	8	23	
	Amos Strunk	31	31	0	
27	Dom DiMaggio	30	30	0	
	Fred Lynn	30	30	0	
	Kirby Puckett*	30	30	0	
	Cy Williams	30	0	30	
31	Brett Butler	29	13	16	
	Joe DiMaggio*	29	29	0	
	Baby Doll Jacobson	29	29	0	
34	Earl Averill*	28	28	0	
	Carlos Beltrán*	28	14	14	
	Curt Flood	28	0	28	
	Lloyd Waner*	28	0	28	
38	Paul Blair	27	27	0	
	Jim Wynn	27	0	27	
40	Jimmy Barrett †	26	26	0	
	Benny Kauff	26	0	18	Includes 8 in Federal League
	Burt Shotton	26	25	1	
43	Johnny Bates	25	0	25	
	Danny Hoffman	25	25	0	
	Solly Hofman	25	0	24	Includes 1 in Federal League
	Mickey Mantle*	25	25	0	
	Jigger Statz	25	0	25	
48	Sam Chapman	24	24	0	
	Ira Flagstead	24	23	1	
	Adam Jones	24	24	0	
	Omar Moreno	24	4	20	
	Johnny Mostil	24	24	0	
53	Andruw Jones*	23	0	23	
	Mark Kotsay	23	12	11	
	Nemo Leibold	23	23	0	
	Terry Moore	23	0	23	
	Jack Smith	23	0	23	
	Homer Smoot	23	0	23	
	Bobby Thomson	23	1	22	
60	César Cedeño	22	0	22	
	Earle Combs*	22	22	0	
	Marquis Grissom	22	0	22	
	Johnny Groth	22	22	0	
	Lance Johnson	22	14	8	
	Willie McGee	22	2	20	
	Rebel Oakes	22	0	18	Includes 4 in Federal League
	B.J. Upton	22	15	7	
68	Ping Bodie	21	21	0	
	Willie Davis	21	1	20	
	Larry Doby*	21	21	0	Negro League totals unavailable
	Emmet Heidrick †	21	19	2	
	Dave Henderson	21	21	0	
	Garry Maddox	21	0	21	
	Gary Pettis	21	21	0	
	Fred Schulte	21	20	1	
	Jimmy Slagle	21	0	21	
	Del Unser	21	15	6	
	Tillie Walker	21	21	0	
	Devon White	21	18	3	
	Hack Wilson*	21	0	21	
	Mookie Wilson	21	3	18	
82	Harry Bay	20	18	2	
	Jackie Bradley Jr.	20	18	2	
	Darrin Jackson	20	2	18	
	Rick Monday	20	11	9	
86	Mike Cameron	19	9	10	
	Taylor Douthit	19	0	19	
	Doug Glanville	19	18	1	
	Dave Philley	19	19	0	
	Chick Stahl †	19	19	0	
91	Lenny Dykstra	18	0	18	
	Carlos Gómez	18	8	10	
	Torii Hunter	18	18	0	
	Charlie Jones	18	18	0	
	Chet Lemon	18	18	0	
	Ray Powell	18	0	18	
	Mickey Rivers	18	18	0	
	Andy Van Slyke	18	1	17	
99	Tommie Agee	17	10	7	
	Wally Berger	17	0	17	

=== Right Fielders ===
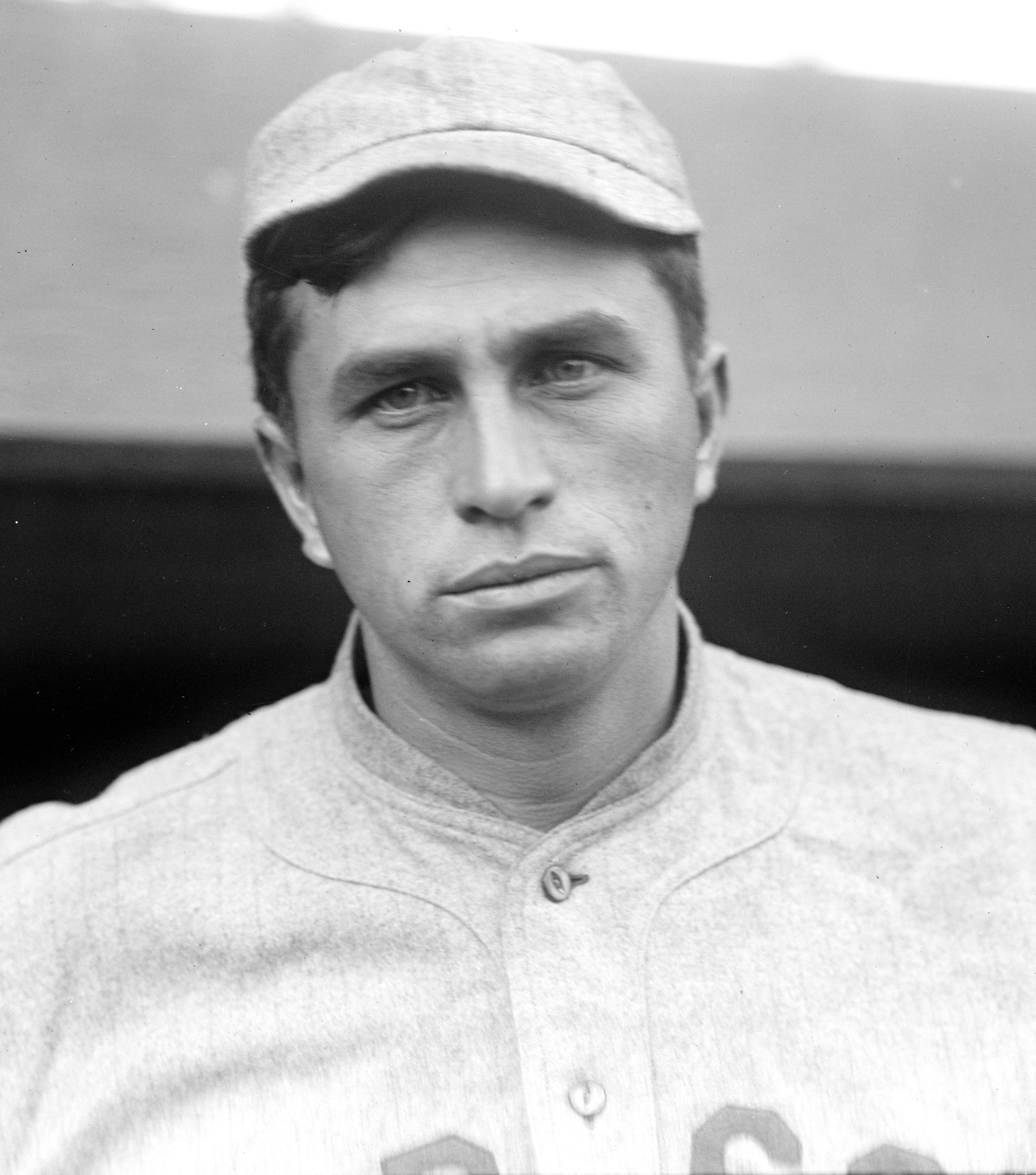
Harry Hooper, the all-time leader in career double plays by a right fielder.

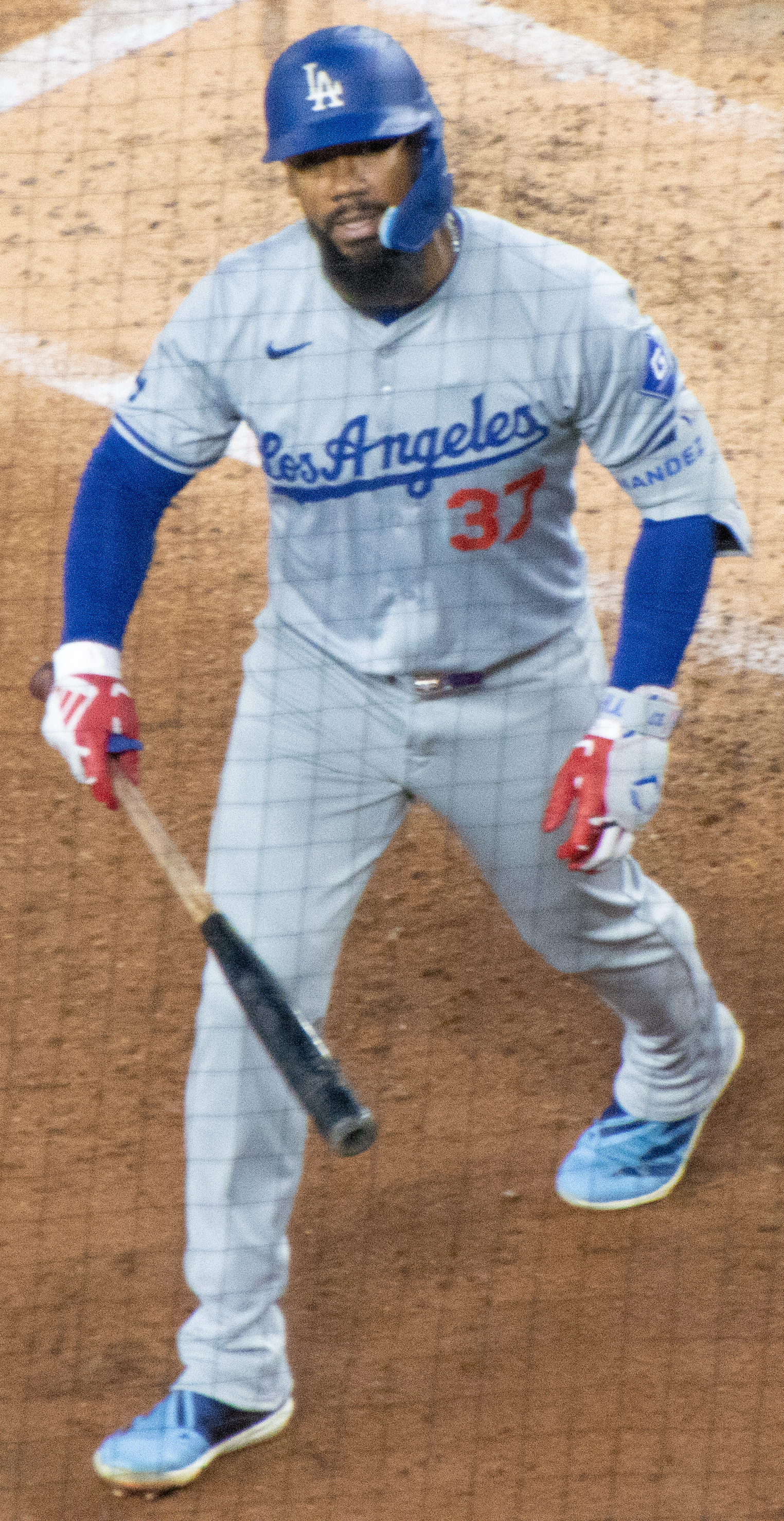
Teoscar Hernández, the active leader in double plays by a right fielder and tied for 150th all-time.

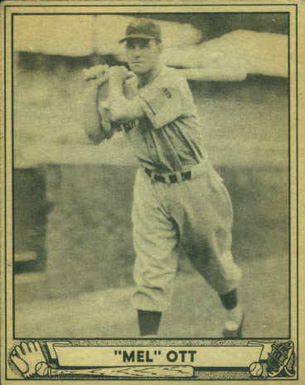
Mel Ott holds the National League record.

Right fielders are most commonly credited with a double play when they throw the ball to an infielder who tags a runner attempting to advance on the basepaths, even on a caught fly ball that results in an out (see tag up); of special importance are throws to the catcher if the runner is trying to reach home plate to score a run, perhaps on a sacrifice fly. Left fielders will often record assists by throwing out runners who try to advance farther than the batter, such as going from first to third base on a single, or batter/runners who try to stretch a hit into a longer one. Outfielders also earn double plays on relay throws to infielders after particularly deep fly balls, by throwing to a base to record an out on an appeal play, or in situations where they might deflect a fly ball before another defensive player makes the catch; in extraordinary instances, right fielders have occasionally recorded double plays by throwing out batters at first base after fielding uncaught line drives that reached them quickly. Outfielders record far fewer double plays than other players due to the difficulty of making an accurate throw in time to retire a runner from a great distance; middle infielders routinely record more double plays in a single season than outfielders do in their entire careers. Double plays are an important statistic for outfielders, giving a greater indication of a left fielder's throwing arm than double plays by infielders do. In recent years, some sabermetricians have begun referring to assists by outfielders as baserunner kills.

Harry Hooper is the all-time leader in career double plays as a right fielder with 86; he is the only right fielder with more than 80 career double plays. Teoscar Hernández, who had 13 double plays of the end of the 2026 season to place him tied for 150th all-time, is the leader among active players.

- Stats updated as of the 2026 season.

Rank	Player (2027 DPs)	Double plays as a right fielder			Other leagues, notes
Rank	Player (2027 DPs)	MLB	American League	National League	Other leagues, notes
1	Harry Hooper*	86	86	0	
2	Mel Ott*	59	0	59	
3	Sam Rice*	55	55	0	
4	Paul Waner*	54	0	54	
5	Sam Crawford* †	50	38	12	
6	Curt Walker	46	0	46	
7	Jesse Barfield	45	45	0	
	Ross Youngs*	45	0	45	
9	Dwight Evans	42	42	0	
10	Chief Wilson	41	0	41	
11	Roberto Clemente*	40	0	40	
	Tommy Griffith	40	0	40	
	John Titus	40	0	40	
	Larry Walker*	40	0	40	
15	Hank Aaron*	39	0	39	
16	Bobby Bonds	38	15	23	
	Harry Heilmann*	38	33	5	
	Mike Mitchell	38	0	38	
19	Frank Schulte	37	4	33	
20	Chuck Klein*	36	0	36	
21	Cliff Heathcote	34	0	34	
	Rusty Staub	34	3	31	
23	George Browne	33	2	31	
	Kiki Cuyler*	33	0	33	
	Elmer Flick* †	33	26	7	
	Wally Moses	33	33	0	
	Casey Stengel*	33	0	33	
28	Vladimir Guerrero*	32	10	22	
	Willie Keeler* †	32	24	8	
30	Jermaine Dye	30	29	1	
	Harry Lumley	30	0	30	
32	Johnny Callison	29	1	28	
	Shano Collins	29	29	0	
	Enos Slaughter*	29	2	27	
	Jack Tobin	29	24	0	Includes 5 in Federal League
36	Tom Brunansky	28	25	3	
	Ty Cobb*	28	28	0	
	Steve Evans	28	0	20	Includes 8 in Federal League
	Max Flack	28	0	24	Includes 4 in Federal League
	Al Kaline*	28	28	0	
	Bob Meusel	28	27	1	
	Socks Seybold †	28	28	0	
	Elmer Smith	28	25	3	
44	Bruce Campbell	27	27	0	
	Tommy Henrich	27	27	0	
	Dave Parker*	27	0	27	
	Billy Southworth*	27	1	26	
	Dave Winfield*	27	11	16	
49	José Bautista	26	26	0	
	Jay Buhner	26	26	0	
	Reggie Jackson*	26	26	0	
52	Dante Bichette	25	13	12	
	Gavvy Cravath	25	0	25	
	Jeff Francoeur	25	7	18	
	Carl Furillo	25	0	25	
	Tommy Holmes	25	0	25	
	Sixto Lezcano	25	14	11	
	Ron Northey	25	0	25	
59	Jack Clark	24	0	24	
	José Guillén	24	10	14	
	Tony Gwynn*	24	0	24	
	Willard Marshall	24	0	24	
	Danny Moeller	24	23	1	
64	Patsy Donovan †	23	5	18	
	Shawn Green	23	14	9	
	Babe Herman	23	0	23	
	Tim Salmon	23	23	0	
	Jimmy Sebring	23	0	23	
	Sammy Sosa	23	1	22	
	Darryl Strawberry	23	1	22	
	Dixie Walker	23	1	22	
	Glenn Wilson	23	4	19	
73	Danny Murphy †	22	19	0	Includes 3 in Federal League
	Rubén Sierra	22	22	0	
	Ichiro Suzuki*	22	22	0	
76	Bobby Abreu	21	9	12	
	Rocky Colavito	21	21	0	
	George Harper	21	2	19	
	Raúl Mondesí	21	7	14	
	Bill Nicholson	21	0	21	
81	Danny Green †	20	20	0	
	Jason Heyward	20	0	20	
	Orlando Merced	20	5	15	
	Bing Miller	20	20	0	
	Paul O'Neill	20	15	5	
	Tony Oliva*	20	20	0	
	Babe Ruth*	20	20	0	
	Homer Summa	20	20	0	
89	Jackie Jensen	19	19	0	
	Magglio Ordóñez	19	19	0	
	Braggo Roth	19	19	0	
92	Jeromy Burnitz	18	3	15	
	Rob Deer	18	0	18	
	Wilbur Good †	18	2	16	
	Willie Kirkland	18	9	9	
	Don Mueller	18	1	17	
	Trot Nixon	18	18	0	
	Ellis Valentine	18	1	17	
	Vic Wertz	18	18	0	
100	Harold Baines*	17	17	0	
	Jay Bruce	17	5	12	
