= Cleveland Guardians award winners and league leaders =

This is a list of award winners and league leaders for the Cleveland Guardians of Major League Baseball.

== Awards ==
=== Most Valuable Player ===
- George Burns (1926)
- Lou Boudreau (1948)
- Al Rosen (1953)

=== Cy Young ===
- Gaylord Perry (1972)
- CC Sabathia (2007)
- Cliff Lee (2008)
- Corey Kluber (2014, 2017)
- Shane Bieber (2020)

=== Triple Crown ===
- Bob Feller (1940)
- Shane Bieber (2020)

=== Reliever of the Year ===
- Jose Mesa (1995)
- Emmanuel Clase (2022, 2024)

=== Rookie of the Year ===
- Herb Score (1955)
- Chris Chambliss (1971)
- Joe Charboneau (1980)
- Sandy Alomar Jr. (1990)

=== Manager of the Year ===
- Eric Wedge (2007)
- Terry Francona (2013, 2016, 2022)
- Stephen Vogt (2024, 2025)

=== Gold Glove Award ===
- Vic Power (1958, 1959, 1960, 1961)
- Minnie Miñoso (1959)
- Jim Piersall (1961)
- Vic Davalillo (1964)
- Ray Fosse (1970, 1971)
- Rick Manning (1976)
- Sandy Alomar Jr. (1990)
- Kenny Lofton (1993, 1994, 1995, 1996)
- Omar Vizquel (1994, 1995, 1996, 1997, 1998, 1999, 2000, 2001)
- Matt Williams (1997)
- Roberto Alomar (1999, 2000, 2001)
- Travis Fryman (2000)
- Grady Sizemore (2007, 2008)
- Francisco Lindor (2016, 2019)
- Roberto Pérez (2019, 2020)
- César Hernández (2020)
- Shane Bieber (2022)
- Andrés Giménez (2022, 2023, 2024)
- Steven Kwan (2022, 2023, 2024, 2025)
- Myles Straw (2022)
- Tanner Bibee (2026)

=== Silver Slugger Award ===
- Andre Thornton (1984)
- Julio Franco (1988)
- Carlos Baerga (1992, 1993)
- Albert Belle (1993, 1994, 1995, 1996)
- Manny Ramirez (1995, 1999, 2000)
- Jim Thome (1996)
- David Justice (1997)
- Matt Williams (1997)
- Roberto Alomar (1999, 2000)
- Juan Gonzalez (2001)
- Victor Martinez (2004)
- Grady Sizemore (2008)
- Asdrúbal Cabrera (2011)
- Michael Brantley (2014)
- Yan Gomes (2014)
- Francisco Lindor (2017, 2018)
- Carlos Santana (2019)
- José Ramírez (2017, 2018, 2020, 2022, 2024, 2025)
- Chase DeLauter (2026)

=== All-MLB Team ===
- José Ramírez (2020, 2023, 2024, 2025)
- Shane Bieber (2020)
- Andrés Giménez (2022)
- Emmanuel Clase (2022, 2023, 2024)
- Cade Smith (2026)

=== Edgar Martínez Award ===
- Ellis Burks (2002)

=== MLB "This Year in Baseball Awards" ===
Note: These awards were renamed the "GIBBY Awards" in 2010 and then the "Esurance MLB Awards" in 2015.

==== "GIBBY Awards" Best Breakout Pitcher ====
- Corey Kluber (2014)

==== "GIBBY Awards" Best Hitting Performance ====
- Lonnie Chisenhall (2014) – for "Chisenhall's career night" (June 9)

=== Wilson defensive awards ===
- Roberto Perez (2019)

=== Lee MacPhail MVP Award (ALCS) ===
- Orel Hershiser (1995)
- Marquis Grissom (1997)
- Andrew Miller (2016)

=== DHL Hometown Heroes (2006) ===
- Bob Feller – voted by MLB fans as the most outstanding player in the history of the franchise, based on on-field performance, leadership quality and character value

== Team award ==
- 1920 – American League pennant
- 1920 – World Series championship
- 1948 – American League pennant
- 1948 – World Series championship
- 1954 – American League pennant
- 1992 – Baseball America Organization of the Year
- 1995 – William Harridge Trophy (American League championship)
- 1997 – William Harridge Trophy (American League championship)
- 2016 – William Harridge Trophy (American League championship)

== Other achievements ==
=== Cleveland Guardians Hall of Fame ===
For a virtual tour, see footnote For photos of inductees' plaques, see footnote

The Guardians Hall of Fame is located at Heritage Park at Progressive Field. Opened in 2007 – in the centerfield area of Progressive Field – Heritage Park contains bronze plaques and other exhibits honoring the franchise's history.

Key
Year	Year inducted
**Bold**	Member of the Baseball Hall of Fame
†	Member of the Baseball Hall of Fame as an Indian
**Bold**	Recipient of the Hall of Fame's Ford C. Frick Award

**Cleveland Guardians Hall of Fame**
Year	No.	Name	Position(s)	Tenure
1951	3, 5	**Earl Averill**^{†}	CF	1929–1939
1951	—	**Jesse Burkett**	LF	1891–1898
1951	18, 49	Mel Harder	P Manager	1928–1947; 1961, 1962
1951	—	Shoeless Joe Jackson	OF	1910–1915
1951	4, 6, 8, 9, 25, 35	Ken Keltner	3B	1937–1944; 1946–1949
1951	—	**Nap Lajoie**^{†}	2B; Manager	1902–1914; 1905–1909
1951	26, 30	Steve O'Neill	C Manager	1911–1923; 1935–1937
1951	2, 4	**Joe Sewell**^{†}	SS/3B	1920–1930
1951	—	**Tris Speaker**^{†}	CF; Manager	1916–1926; 1919–1926
1951	7, 25	Hal Trosky	1B	1933–1941
1951	—	**Cy Young**^{†}	P	1909–1911
1954	5, 34	**Lou Boudreau**^{†}	SS; Manager	1938–1950; 1942–1950
1957	—	Bill Bradley	3B; Manager	1901–1910; 1909
1957	9, 14, 19	**Bob Feller**^{†}	P	1936–1941; 1945–1956
1960	6, 21, 38, 42	**Bob Lemon**^{†}	P	1941–1942; 1946–1958
1963	—	**Elmer Flick**^{†}	RF	1902–1910
1965	29, 31	**Satchel Paige**	P	1948–1949
1966	—	**Stan Coveleski**^{†}	P	1916–1924
1966	6, 14, 37	**Larry Doby**^{†}	CF	1947–1955, 1958
1966	4, 10, 14, 30, 40	Jim Hegan	C	1941–1942; 1946–1957
1972	24, 38	**Early Wynn**^{†}	P	1949–1957, 1963
2006	—	Ray Chapman	SS	1912–1920
2006	6, 21, 38	Rocky Colavito	RF/LF	1955–1959; 1965–1967
2006	—	**Addie Joss**^{†}	P	1902–1910
2006	12	**Al López**^{†}	C Manager	1947; 1951–1956
2006	17, 34, 48	Sam McDowell	P	1961–1971
2006	7, 17	Al Rosen	3B	1947–1956
2006	27	Herb Score	P Broadcaster	1955–1959; 1964–1997
2006	—	Louis Sockalexis	OF	1897–1899
2007	—	Jim Bagby, Sr.	P	1916–1922
2007	7, 22, 25	Mike Garcia	P	1948–1959
2007	41	Charles Nagy	P	1990–2002
2007	29	Andre Thornton	1B/DH	1977–1987
2008	4	**Joe Gordon**	2B; Manager	1947–1950; 1958–1960
2008	21	Mike Hargrove	1B; Manager	1979–1985; 1991–1999
2009	15	Sandy Alomar Jr.	C Coach; Manager	1990–2000; 2010–present 2012
2009	14, 22	Wes Ferrell	P	1927–1933
2010	7	Kenny Lofton	CF	1992–1996; 1998–2001, 2007
2012	35, 36	**Gaylord Perry**	P	1972–1975
2013	9	Carlos Baerga	2B	1990–1996, 1999
2014	13	Omar Vizquel	SS	1994–2004
2016	8, 36	Albert Belle	LF	1989–1996
2016	7, 11, 28	Charlie Jamieson	OF	1919–1932
2016	20, 33	**Frank Robinson**	RF/LF; Manager	1974–1976; 1975–1977
2016	6, 25, 59	**Jim Thome**^{†}	3B/1B	1991–2002, 2011
2023	46, 33, 34, 3	Dale Mitchell	LF	1946–1956
2023	24	Manny Ramirez	RF	1993–2000
2024	52	**CC Sabathia**	P	2001–2008

==== Cleveland Guardians Distinguished Hall of Fame ====
The team established its Distinguished Hall of Fame in 2009 to honor non-uniformed personnel who made significant contributions to the franchise.

**Cleveland Guardians Distinguished Hall of Fame**
Year	Name	Role(s)	Tenure
2009	Richard E. Jacobs	Owner	1986–2000
2009	Bill Veeck	Owner	1946–1949
2010	Cy Slapnicka	General manager Scout	1935–1940; 1941–1961
2012	**Jack Graney**^{†}	OF; Broadcaster	1908, 1910–1922; 1933–1953
2012	Jim Warfield	Trainer	1965–2002
2013	John Hart	General manager	1991–2001
2014	**Jimmy Dudley**^{†}	Broadcaster	1948–1968
2014	Mike Hegan	Broadcaster	1989–2011
2015	Hank Peters	President	1987–1991
2019	Dennis Lehman	Executive vice president	1988–2019
2022	John Adams	Fan	1973–2022
2022	Mike Seghi	Travel director	1974–2022
2024	Cy Buynak	Clubhouse manager	1962–2006
2024	Johnny Goryl	Coach	1982–1988, 1997–1998
2025	**Tom Hamilton**^{†}	Broadcaster	1990–

=== Greater Cleveland Sports Hall of Fame ===
**Cleveland Indians in the Greater Cleveland Sports Hall of Fame**
No.	Player	Position	Tenure	Notes
31, 34	Brian Anderson	P	1996–1997, 2003	Attended Geneva High School
39	Len Barker	P	1979–1983	
—	Bill Bradley	3B; Manager	1901–1910; 1905, 1909	Born in Cleveland
23	Ellis Burks	OF	2001–2003	Elected mainly on his performance with Boston Red Sox
34	Joe Charboneau	LF/DH	1980–1982	
—	Larry J. Dolan	Owner	2000–2025	Born in Cleveland Heights, attended Cleveland State University
9	Luke Easter	1B	1949–1954	
9, 14, 19	Bob Feller	P	1936–1941, 1945–1956	
—	Elmer Flick	RF	1902–1910	
32, 48	Travis Hafner	DH/1B	2003–2012	
18, 49	Mel Harder	P Manager	1928–1947; 1961, 1962	
21	Mike Hargrove	1B; Manager	1979–1985; 1991–1999	
—	Mike Hegan	Broadcaster	1989–2011	Born in Cleveland
—	Paddy Livingston	C	1912	Born in Cleveland
2, 6, 36, 38	Ray Mack	2B	1938–1946	Born in Cleveland
20, 28	Rick Manning	CF; Broadcaster	1975–1983; 1990–present	
4, 24	Joe Nossek	Coach	1977–1981	Born in Cleveland
26, 30	Steve O'Neill	C Manager	1911–1923; 1935–1937	
10, 27	Roger Peckinpaugh	SS; Manager	1910, 1912–1913; 1928–1933, 1941	Grew up in Cleveland
10	Rich Rollins	3B	1970	Grew up in Cleveland
27	Herb Score	P Broadcaster	1955–1959; 1964–1997	
—	Tris Speaker	CF; Manager	1916–1926; 1919–1926	
29	Andre Thornton	1B/DH	1977–1979, 1981–1987	
6	Joe Vosmik	LF	1930–1936	Born in Cleveland
—	Bill Wambsganss	2B	1914–1923	Born in Cleveland

=== Cleveland Chapter / BBWAA awards ===
==== Cleveland Indians Man of the Year Award ====
See footnote The "Cleveland Indians Man of the Year Award" was established in 1946, but was renamed the "Bob Feller Man of the Year Award" in 2010.

From 1937 to 1943, the award was known as the "Cleveland Indians Most Valuable Player Award" chosen by the Cleveland BBWAA. There were no awards given for the years 1944 and 1945.

==== Frank Gibbons-Steve Olin Good Guy Award ====
See footnote

=== Associated Press Athlete of the Year ===
- Lou Boudreau (1948)

== American League Statistical Leaders ==
=== Batting ===
Batting Average

- Nap Lajoie (.344, 1903)
- Nap Lajoie (.376, 1904)
- Elmer Flick (.308, 1905)
- Nap Lajoie (.384, 1910)
- Tris Speaker (.386, 1916)
- Lew Fonseca (.369, 1929)
- Lou Boudreau (.355, 1948)
- Bobby Ávila (.341, 1954)

On-base percentage

- Nap Lajoie (.413, 1904)
- Joe Jackson (.468, 1911)
- Tris Speaker (.470, 1916)
- Tris Speaker (.474, 1922)
- Tris Speaker (.479, 1925)
- Larry Doby (.442, 1950)
- Mike Hargrove (.424, 1981)

Slugging Percentage

- Nap Lajoie (.518, 1903)
- Nap Lajoie (.552, 1904)
- Elmer Flick (.462, 1905)
- Joe Jackson (.551, 1913)
- Tris Speaker (.502, 1916)
- Larry Doby (.541, 1952)
- Al Rosen (.613, 1953)
- Rocky Colavito (.620, 1958)
- Albert Belle (.690, 1995)
- Manny Ramirez (.663, 1999)
- Manny Ramirez (.697, 2000)
- Jim Thome (.677, 2002)

OPS

- Nap Lajoie (.896, 1903)
- Nap Lajoie (.965, 1904)
- Elmer Flick (.845, 1905)
- Joe Jackson (1.011, 1913)
- Tris Speaker (.972, 1916)
- Larry Doby (.986, 1950)
- Al Rosen (1.034, 1953)
- Manny Ramirez (1.105, 1999)
- Manny Ramirez (1.154, 2000) Team Record
- Jim Thome (1.122, 2002)
- Travis Hafner(1.097, 2006)

Games

- Elmer Flick (157, 1906)
- Nap Lajoie (157, 1908)
- Nap Lajoie (159, 1910)
- Larry Gardner (154, 1920) Co-Leader
- Joe Sewell (155, 1928) Co-Leader
- Johnny Hodapp (154, 1930) Co-Leader
- Earl Averill (154, 1934) Co-Leader
- Hal Trosky (154, 1934) Co-Leader
- Hal Trosky (154, 1935)
- Bill Knickerbocker (155, 1936) Co-Leader
- Ken Keltner (154, 1939) Co-Leader
- Lou Boudreau (155, 1940) Co-Leader
- Les Fleming (156, 1942)
- Mickey Rocco (155, 1944) Co-Leader
- Al Rosen (154, 1951) Co-Leader
- Al Smith (154, 1955) Co-Leader
- Leon Wagner (162, 1964) Co-Leader Team Record
- Rocky Colavito (162, 1965) Co-Leader
- Toby Harrah (162, 1982) Co-Leader
- Joe Carter (162, 1989) Co-Leader
- Grady Sizemore (162, 2006) Co-Leader

At Bats

- Elmer Flick (624, 1906)
- Nap Lajoie (591, 1910)
- Charlie Jamieson (644, 1923) Co-Leader
- Carl Lind (650, 1928)
- Earl Averill (627, 1931)
- Mickey Rocco (653, 1944)
- Dale Mitchell (640, 1949)
- Julio Franco (658, 1984)
- Joe Carter (651, 1989) Co-Leader
- Kenny Lofton (662, 1996)

Runs

- Elmer Flick (98, 1906)
- Ray Chapman (84, 1918)
- Larry Doby (104, 1952)
- Al Rosen (115, 1953)
- Al Smith (123, 1955)
- Albert Belle (121, 1995) Co-Leader
- Roberto Alomar (138, 1999)
- Grady Sizemore (134, 2006)
- José Ramírez (45, 2020)

Hits

- Nap Lajoie (208, 1904)
- Nap Lajoie (214, 1906)
- Nap Lajoie (227, 1910)
- Joe Jackson (226, 1912) Co-Leader
- Joe Jackson (197, 1913)
- Tris Speaker (211, 1916)
- Charlie Jamieson (222, 1923)
- George Burns (216, 1926) Co-Leader
- Johnny Hodapp (225, 1930)
- Joe Vosmik (216, 1935)
- Earl Averill (232, 1936)
- Dale Mitchell (203, 1949)
- Kenny Lofton (160, 1994)

Total Bases

- Nap Lajoie (305, 1904)
- Nap Lajoie (304, 1910)
- Joe Jackson (331, 1912)
- Hal Trosky (405, 1936) Team Record
- Al Rosen (297, 1952)
- Al Rosen (367, 1953)
- Rocky Colavito (301, 1959)
- Albert Belle (294, 1994)
- Albert Belle (377, 1995)

Doubles

- Nap Lajoie (49, 1904)
- Nap Lajoie (48, 1906)
- Nap Lajoie (51, 1910)
- Joe Jackson (39, 1913)
- Jack Graney (41, 1916) Co-Leader
- Tris Speaker (41, 1916) Co-Leader
- Tris Speaker (33, 1918)
- Tris Speaker (50, 1920)
- Tris Speaker (52, 1921)
- Tris Speaker (48, 1922)
- Tris Speaker (59, 1923)
- Joe Sewell (45, 1924) Co-Leader
- George Burns (64, 1926) Team Record
- Johnny Hodapp (51, 1930)
- Joe Vosmik (47, 1935)
- Lou Boudreau (45, 1941)
- Lou Boudreau (45, 1944)
- Lou Boudreau (45, 1947)
- Tito Francona (36, 1960)
- Albert Belle (52, 1995) Co-Leader
- Grady Sizemore (53, 2006)
- José Ramírez (56, 2017)
- César Hernández (20, 2020)
- José Ramírez (44, 2022)

Triples

- Elmer Flick (18, 1905)
- Elmer Flick (22, 1906)
- Elmer Flick (18, 1907)
- Joe Jackson (26, 1912) Team Record
- Joe Vosmik (20, 1935)
- Earl Averill (15, 1936) Co-Leader
- Jeff Heath (18, 1938)
- Jeff Heath (20, 1941)
- Hank Edwards (16, 1946)
- Dale Mitchell (23, 1949)
- Bobby Ávila (11, 1952)
- Brett Butler (14, 1986)
- Kenny Lofton (13, 1995)
- Michael Bourn (10, 2014) Co-Leader
- Amed Rosario (9, 2022)

Home Runs

- Al Rosen (43, 1953)
- Rocky Colavito (42, 1959) Co-Leader
- Albert Belle (50, 1995)

RBI

- Nap Lajoie (102, 1904)
- Hal Trosky (162, 1936)
- Al Rosen (105, 1952)
- Al Rosen (145, 1953)
- Larry Doby (126, 1954)
- Rocky Colavito (108, 1965)
- Joe Carter (121, 1986)
- Albert Belle (129, 1993)
- Albert Belle (126, 1995)
- Albert Belle (148, 1996)
- Manny Ramirez (165, 1999) Team Record

Walks

- Jack Graney (94, 1917)
- Ray Chapman (84, 1918)
- Jack Graney (105, 1919)
- Rocky Colavito (93, 1965)
- Jim Thome (120, 1997)
- Jim Thome (127, 1999) Team Record
- Jim Thome (122, 2002)
- Carlos Santana (113, 2014)

Strikeouts

- Braggo Roth (73, 1917)
- Ed Morgan (66, 1930) Co-Leader
- Pat Seerey (99, 1944)
- Pat Seerey (97, 1945)
- Pat Seerey (101, 1946) Co-Leader
- Larry Doby (111, 1952) Co-Leader
- Larry Doby (121, 1953)
- Jim Thome (171, 1999)
- Jim Thome (185, 2001) Team Record

Stolen Bases

- Harry Bay (45, 1903)
- Harry Bay (38, 1904) Co-Leader
- Elmer Flick (38, 1904) Co-Leader
- Elmer Flick (39, 1906) Co-Leader
- George Case (28, 1946)
- Kenny Lofton (66, 1992)
- Kenny Lofton (70, 1993)
- Kenny Lofton (60, 1994)
- Kenny Lofton (54, 1995)
- Kenny Lofton (75, 1996) Team Record

Singles

- Nap Lajoie (165, 1910)
- Tris Speaker (160, 1916)
- Charlie Jamieson (172, 1923) Team Record
- Charlie Jamieson (168, 1924)
- Dale Mitchell (162, 1948)
- Dale Mitchell (161, 1949)
- Carlos Baerga (152, 1992)
- Kenny Lofton (148, 1993)
- Kenny Lofton (107, 1994) Co-Leader

Runs Created

- Nap Lajoie (124, 1904)
- Nap Lajoie (134, 1910)
- Joe Jackson (133, 1913)
- Tris Speaker (128, 1916)
- Al Rosen (153, 1953)
- Manny Ramirez (151, 1999) Co-Leader

Extra-Base Hits

- Nap Lajoie (70, 1904)
- Nap Lajoie (62, 1910)
- Hal Trosky (96, 1936)
- Al Rosen (75, 1953)
- Rocky Colavito (70, 1958)
- Rocky Colavito (66, 1959)
- Albert Belle (73, 1994) Co-Leader
- Albert Belle (103, 1995) Team Record
- Grady Sizemore (92, 2006)
- José Ramírez (91, 2017)
- José Ramírez (34, 2020)

Times on Base

- Nap Lajoie (292, 1910)
- Joe Jackson (282, 1913)
- Tris Speaker (297, 1916)
- Tris Speaker (217, 1918)
- Al Rosen (290, 1953)
- Al Smith (294, 1955)
- Rocky Colavito (266, 1965)

Hit By Pitch

- Bill Hinchman (15, 1907)
- Braggo Roth (8, 1918) Co-Leader
- Lew Fonseca (7, 1929)
- Earl Averill (6, 1932) Co-Leader
- Frankie Pytlak (5, 1934) Co-Leader
- Larry Doby (7, 1949) Co-Leader
- Luke Easter (10, 1950) Co-Leader
- Al Rosen (10, 1950) Co-Leader
- Minnie Miñoso (15, 1958)
- Minnie Miñoso (17, 1959)
- Max Alvis (10, 1963)
- Max Alvis (9, 1965) Co-Leader
- Roy Foster (12, 1970)
- Travis Hafner (17, 2004)
- Andrés Giménez (25, 2022) Team Record

Sacrifice Hits

- Bill Bradley (46, 1907)
- Bill Bradley (60, 1908)
- Ray Chapman (45, 1913)
- Terry Turner (38, 1914) Co-Leader
- Ray Chapman (67, 1917) Team Record
- Ray Chapman (50, 1919)
- Bill Wambsganss (43, 1921)
- Bill Wambsganss (42, 1922)
- Freddy Spurgeon (35, 1926)
- Joe Sewell (41, 1929)
- Lou Boudreau (14, 1941) Co-Leader
- Lou Boudreau (15, 1946) Co-Leader
- Bobby Ávila (19, 1954)
- Bobby Ávila (18, 1955)
- Dick Howser (16, 1964) Co-Leader
- Eddie Leon (23, 1970)
- Félix Fermín (32, 1989)
- Omar Vizquel (16, 1997)
- Omar Vizquel (17, 1999)
- Omar Vizquel (20, 2004)
- Coco Crisp (13, 2005)
- José Ramírez (13, 2014)

Sacrifice Flies

- Al Rosen (11, 1954)
- Vic Wertz (11, 1957)
- Vic Power (12, 1961) Co-Leader
- Jack Heidemann (10, 1970) Co-Leader
- Albert Belle (14, 1993)
- Roberto Alomar (13, 1999)
- Juan Gonzalez (16, 2001) Team Record

Intentional Walks

- Andre Thornton (18, 1982) Co-Leader
- Jose Ramirez (20, 2022)
- Jose Ramirez (22, 2023) Team Record

Grounded into Double Plays

- Lou Boudreau (23, 1940)
- Rocky Colavito (25, 1965) Co-Leader
- Julio Franco (28, 1986) Team Record

At Bats per Strikeout

- Nap Lajoie (27.4, 1913)
- Nap Lajoie (27.9, 1914)
- Tris Speaker (52.3, 1918)
- Tris Speaker (42.5, 1920)
- Stuffy McInnis (107.4, 1922)
- Joe Sewell (152, 1925) Team Record
- Joe Sewell (96.3, 1926)
- Joe Sewell (81.3, 1927)
- Joe Sewell (65.3, 1928)
- Joe Sewell (144.5, 1929)
- Joe Sewell (117.7, 1930)
- Joe Vosmik (40.5, 1934)
- Lou Boudreau (36.8, 1946)
- Lou Boudreau (53.8, 1947)
- Lou Boudreau (62.2, 1948)
- Dale Mitchell (58.2, 1949)
- Dale Mitchell (56.8, 1952)
- Buddy Bell (16.1, 1972)
- Félix Fermín (34.3, 1993)

At Bats per Home Run

- Charlie Hickman (43.5, 1903)
- Bill Hinchman (77.3, 1908)
- Pat Seerey (22.8, 1944)
- Al Rosen (15.0, 1950)
- Luke Easter (14.1, 1952)
- Rocky Colavito (11.9, 1958)
- Boog Powell (16.1, 1975)
- Manny Ramirez (11.9, 1999)
- Manny Ramirez (11.6, 2000)
- Jim Thome (10.7, 2001)
- Jim Thome (9.2, 2002) Team Record

Outs

- Ray Chapman (460, 1917)
- Bill Wambsganss (485, 1920)
- Freddy Spurgeon (470, 1926) Co-Leader
- Homer Summa (442, 1927) Co-Leader
- Carl Lind (491, 1928)
- Mickey Rocco (509, 1944) Co-Leader
- Max Alvis (515, 1967) Team Record

=== Pitching ===
ERA

- Earl Moore (1.74, 1903)
- Addie Joss (1.59, 1904)
- Addie Joss (1.16, 1908) Team Record
- Vean Gregg (1.80, 1911)
- Stan Coveleski (2.76, 1923)
- Mel Harder (2.95, 1933)
- Bob Feller (2.61, 1940)
- Gene Bearden (2.43, 1948)
- Mike Garcia (2.36, 1949)
- Early Wynn (3.20, 1950)
- Mike Garcia (2.64, 1954)
- Sam McDowell (2.18, 1965)
- Luis Tiant (1.60, 1968)
- Rick Sutcliffe (2.96, 1982)
- Kevin Millwood (2.86, 2005)
- Cliff Lee (2.54, 2008)
- Corey Kluber (2.25, 2017)
- Shane Bieber (1.63, 2020)

Wins

- Addie Joss (27, 1907) Co-Leader
- Jim Bagby, Sr. (31, 1920) Team Record
- George Uhle (26, 1923)
- George Uhle (27, 1926)
- Bob Feller (24, 1939)
- Bob Feller (27, 1940)
- Bob Feller (25, 1941)
- Bob Feller (26, 1946) Co-Leader
- Bob Feller (20, 1947)
- Bob Lemon (23, 1950)
- Bob Feller (22, 1951)
- Bob Lemon (23, 1954) Co-Leader
- Early Wynn (23, 1954) Co-Leader
- Bob Lemon (18, 1955) Co-Leader
- Jim Perry (18, 1960) Co-Leader
- Gaylord Perry (24, 1972) Co-Leader
- Cliff Lee (22, 2008)
- Shane Bieber (8, 2020)

Won–Loss %

- Ed Klepfer (.778, 1917)
- Jim Bagby, Sr. (.721, 1920)
- George Uhle (.711, 1926)
- Johnny Allen (.938, 1937) Team Record
- Steve Hargan (.786, 1970)
- Cliff Lee (.783, 2005)
- Cliff Lee (.880, 2008)
- Shane Bieber (.889, 2020)

WHIP

- Addie Joss (.948, 1903)
- Addie Joss (.806, 1908) Team Record
- Vean Gregg (1.054, 1911)
- Stan Coveleski (1.108, 1920)
- Bob Feller (1.133, 1940)
- Bob Feller (1.194, 1947)
- Bob Lemon (1.226, 1948)
- Early Wynn (1.25, 1950)
- Mike Garcia (1.125, 1954)
- Corey Kluber (0.87, 2017)

Hits Allowed/9IP

- Earl Moore (7.12, 1903)
- Addie Joss (6.42, 1908)
- Vean Gregg (6.33, 1911)
- Stan Coveleski (6.09, 1917)
- Stan Coveleski (8.11, 1920)
- Bob Feller (7.29, 1938)
- Bob Feller (6.89, 1939)
- Bob Feller (6.88, 1940)
- Allie Reynolds (6.34, 1943)
- Steve Gromek (7.07, 1944)
- Early Wynn (6.99, 1950)
- Bob Lemon (6.86, 1952)
- Herb Score (5.85, 1956)
- Herb Score (6.89, 1959)
- Sam McDowell (5.87, 1965)
- Sam McDowell (6.02, 1966)
- Luis Tiant (5.30, 1968)
- Rick Sutcliffe (7.25, 1982)
- CC Sabathia (7.44, 2001)

Walks/9IP

- Addie Joss (.83, 1908) Team Record
- Addie Joss (1.15, 1909)
- Sherry Smith (1.53, 1924)
- Sherry Smith (1.82, 1925)
- Clint Brown (1.71, 1932)
- Clint Brown (1.65, 1933)
- Mel Harder (1.66, 1935)
- Dick Donovan (1.69, 1962)
- Dick Donovan (1.22, 1963)
- Ralph Terry (1.25, 1965)
- Greg Swindell (1.17, 1991)
- Cliff Lee (1.37, 2008)

Strikeouts/9IP

- Heinie Berger (5.90, 1909)
- Guy Morton (5.16, 1918)
- Guy Morton (4.53, 1922)
- Johnny Allen (6.11, 1936)
- Bob Feller (7.78, 1938)
- Bob Feller (7.46, 1939)
- Bob Feller (7.33, 1940)
- Bob Feller (6.82, 1941)
- Allie Reynolds (6.84, 1943)
- Bob Feller (5.90, 1947)
- Early Wynn (6.02, 1950)
- Herb Score (9.70, 1955)
- Herb Score (9.49, 1956)
- Herb Score (8.23, 1959)
- Sam McDowell (9.19, 1964)
- Sam McDowell (10.71, 1965)
- Sam McDowell (10.42, 1966)
- Luis Tiant (9.22, 1967)
- Sam McDowell (9.47, 1968)
- Sam McDowell (8.81, 1969)
- Sam McDowell (8.97, 1970)
- Len Barker (6.83, 1980)
- Len Barker (7.41, 1981)
- Shane Bieber (14.198, 2020)

Games

- Jim Bagby, Sr. (45, 1918) Co-Leader
- Jim Bagby, Sr. (48, 1920)
- Johnny Humphries (45, 1938)
- Bob Feller (43, 1940)
- Bob Feller (44, 1941)
- Joe Heving (63, 1944)
- Bob Feller (48, 1946)
- Ed Klieman (58, 1947)
- Ray Narleski (60, 1955)

Saves

- Bill Hoffer (3, 1901)
- Otto Hess (3, 1906) Co-Leader
- Ed Klieman (17, 1947) Co-Leader
- Russ Christopher (17, 1948)
- Ray Narleski (19, 1955)
- Johnny Klippstein (14, 1960) Co-Leader
- José Mesa (46, 1995)
- Bob Wickman (45, 2005) Co-Leader
- Joe Borowski (45, 2007)
- Brad Hand (15, 2020)

Innings

- Jim Bagby, Sr. (339 2/3, 1920)
- George Uhle (357 2/3, 1923)
- George Uhle (318 1/3, 1926)
- Bob Feller (296 2/3, 1939)
- Bob Feller (320 1/3, 1940)
- Bob Feller (343, 1941)
- Jim Bagby Jr. (273, 1943)
- Bob Feller (371 1/3, 1946) Team Record
- Bob Feller (299, 1947)
- Bob Lemon (293 2/3, 1948)
- Bob Lemon (288, 1950)
- Early Wynn (274 1/3, 1951)
- Bob Lemon (309 2/3, 1952)
- Bob Lemon (286 2/3, 1953)
- Early Wynn (270 2/3, 1954)
- Sam McDowell (305, 1970) Co-Leader

Strikeouts

- Stan Coveleski (133, 1920)
- Bob Feller (240, 1938)
- Bob Feller (246, 1939)
- Bob Feller (261, 1940)
- Bob Feller (260, 1941)
- Allie Reynolds (151, 1943)
- Bob Feller (348, 1946) Team Record
- Bob Feller (196, 1947)
- Bob Feller (164, 1948)
- Bob Lemon (170, 1950)
- Herb Score (245, 1955)
- Herb Score (263, 1956)
- Early Wynn (184, 1957)
- Sam McDowell (325, 1965)
- Sam McDowell (225, 1966)
- Sam McDowell (283, 1968)
- Sam McDowell (279, 1969)
- Sam McDowell (304, 1970)
- Len Barker (187, 1980)
- Len Barker (127, 1981)
- Shane Bieber (122, 2020)

Games Started

- Stan Coveleski (40, 1921)
- George Uhle (40, 1922)
- George Uhle (44, 1923) Team Record
- George Uhle (36, 1926)
- Bob Feller (37, 1940)
- Bob Feller (40, 1941)
- Jim Bagby Jr. (35, 1942)
- Jim Bagby Jr. (33, 1943)
- Bob Feller (42, 1946)
- Bob Feller (37, 1947)
- Bob Feller (38, 1948)
- Bob Lemon (37, 1950)
- Bob Lemon (34, 1951) Co-Leader
- Early Wynn (34, 1951) Co-Leader
- Mike Garcia (36, 1952) Co-Leader
- Bob Lemon (36, 1952) Co-Leader
- Early Wynn (36, 1954)
- Early Wynn (37, 1957)
- Jim Perry (36, 1960) Co-Leader

Complete Games

- Jim Bagby, Sr. (30, 1920)
- George Uhle (29, 1923)
- Sherry Smith (22, 1925) Co-Leader
- George Uhle (32, 1926)
- Wes Ferrell (27, 1931) Co-Leader
- Bob Feller (24, 1939) Co-Leader
- Bob Feller (31, 1940)
- Bob Feller (36, 1946) Team Record
- Bob Lemon (20, 1948)
- Bob Lemon (22, 1950) Co-Leader
- Bob Lemon (28, 1952)
- Bob Lemon (21, 1954) Co-Leader
- Bob Lemon (21, 1956) Co-Leader
- Gaylord Perry (29, 1972)
- Gaylord Perry (29, 1973)
- Tom Candiotti (17, 1986)
- Jake Westbrook (5, 2004) Co-Leader
- Corey Kluber (5, 2017) Co-Leader

Shutouts

- Addie Joss (5, 1902)
- Stan Coveleski (9, 1917)
- George Uhle (5, 1922)
- Stan Coveleski (5, 1923)
- Clint Brown (3, 1930)
- Oral Hildebrand (6, 1933)
- Mel Harder (6, 1934) Co-Leader
- Bob Feller (4, 1940) Co-Leader
- Al Milnar (4, 1940) Co-Leader
- Bob Feller (6, 1941)
- Bob Feller (10, 1946) Team Record
- Bob Feller (5, 1947)
- Bob Lemon (10, 1948) Team Record
- Mike Garcia (6, 1952) Co-Leader
- Mike Garcia (5, 1954) Co-Leader
- Herb Score (5, 1956)
- Jim Perry (4, 1960) Co-Leader
- Dick Donovan (5, 1962) Co-Leader
- Sam McDowell (5, 1966) Co-Leader
- Luis Tiant (5, 1966) Co-Leader
- Steve Hargan (6, 1967) Co-Leader
- Luis Tiant (9, 1968)
- Cliff Lee (2, 2008) Co-Leader
- Corey Kluber (3, 2017) Co-Leader

Home Runs Allowed

- Jim Bagby Jr. (19, 1942)
- Bob Feller (22, 1951)
- Early Wynn (23, 1952)
- Jim Perry (35, 1960)
- Luis Tiant (37, 1969)

Walks Allowed

- Earl Moore (101, 1902)
- Gene Krapp (138, 1911)
- George Kahler (121, 1912)
- Vean Gregg (124, 1913)
- George Uhle (118, 1926)
- Wes Ferrell (130, 1931)
- Bob Feller (208, 1938) Team Record
- Bob Feller (142, 1939)
- Bob Feller (194, 1941)
- Allie Reynolds (130, 1945)
- Bob Feller (153, 1946)
- Early Wynn (132, 1952)
- Sam McDowell (132, 1965)
- Sam McDowell (123, 1967)
- Sam McDowell (110, 1968)
- Luis Tiant (129, 1969)
- Sam McDowell (131, 1970)
- Sam McDowell (153, 1971)

Hits Allowed

- Jim Bagby, Sr. (277, 1917)
- Stan Coveleski (286, 1919)
- Jim Bagby, Sr. (338, 1920)
- George Uhle (378, 1923) Team Record
- George Uhle (300, 1926)
- Willis Hudlin (291, 1927)
- Bob Feller (284, 1941)
- Jim Bagby Jr. (248, 1943)
- Bob Feller (277, 1946)
- Bob Feller (255, 1948)
- Bob Lemon (281, 1950)
- Bob Lemon (244, 1951)
- Mike Garcia (284, 1952)
- Bob Lemon (283, 1953)
- Early Wynn (270, 1957)
- Cal McLish (253, 1959)

Strikeout to Walk

- Bob Feller (2.21, 1940)
- Mike Garcia (1.57, 1949)
- Sonny Siebert (4.15, 1965)
- Dennis Eckersley (3.54, 1977)
- Greg Swindell (5.45, 1991)

Losses

- Joe Shaute (17, 1924) Co-Leader
- Bob Lemon (14, 1951) Co-Leader
- Luis Tiant (20, 1969)
- Wayne Garland (19, 1977)
- Rick Wise (19, 1978)

Earned Runs Allowed

- George Uhle (150, 1923) Team Record
- Monte Pearson (128, 1934)
- Early Wynn (126, 1957)
- Jim Perry (117, 1961) Co-Leader
- Sam McDowell (101, 1967)

Wild Pitches

- Earl Moore (13, 1901) Co-Leader
- Otto Hess (18, 1905) Team Record
- Bob Rhoads (14, 1907) Co-Leader
- Heinie Berger (13, 1909)
- Cy Falkenberg (13, 1913)
- George Uhle (8, 1926) Co-Leader
- Garland Buckeye (10, 1927)
- Joe Shaute (7, 1928)
- Monte Pearson (15, 1934)
- Bob Feller (14, 1939)
- Gene Bearden (11, 1949)
- Herb Score (12, 1955)
- Herb Score (11, 1956)
- Cal McLish (8, 1957)
- Herb Score (14, 1959)
- Sam McDowell (17, 1965)
- Sam McDowell (18, 1967)
- Sam McDowell (17, 1970)
- Gaylord Perry (17, 1973)
- Len Barker (14, 1980)
- Jack Morris (13, 1994) Co-Leader

Hit Batsmen

- Otto Hess (24, 1906) Team Record
- Vean Gregg (14, 1913) Co-Leader
- George Uhle (13, 1924) Co-Leader
- George Uhle (13, 1926)
- Earl Whitehill (9, 1938)
- Al Smith (6, 1940) Co-Leader
- Allie Reynolds (7, 1943)

Batters Faced

- Jim Bagby, Sr. (1,364, 1920)
- George Uhle (1,548, 1923) Team Record
- George Uhle (1,367, 1926)
- Bob Feller (1,304, 1940)
- Bob Feller (1,466, 1941)
- Jim Bagby Jr. (1,135, 1943)
- Bob Feller (1,512, 1946)
- Bob Feller (1,218, 1947)
- Bob Lemon (1,214, 1948)
- Bob Lemon (1,254, 1950)
- Bob Lemon (1,139, 1951)
- Bob Lemon (1,252, 1952)
- Bob Lemon (1,216, 1953)
- Early Wynn (1,102, 1954)
- Early Wynn (1,146, 1957)
- Sam McDowell (1,257, 1970)

Games Finished

- José Mesa (57, 1995) Co-Leader

Oldest Player

- Cy Young (42, 1909)
- Deacon McGuire (46, 1910)
- Cy Young (44, 1911)
- Joe Heving (41, 1942)
- Joe Heving (42, 1943)
- Joe Heving (43, 1944)
- Satchel Paige (42, 1949)
- Early Wynn (43, 1963)
- Phil Niekro (47, 1986)
- Dave Winfield (43, 1995)
- Dennis Martínez (41, 1996)

Youngest Player

- Ed Cermak (19, 1901)
- Mel Harder (18, 1928)
- Bob Feller (17, 1936)
- Bob Feller (18, 1937)
- Vern Freiburger (17, 1941)
- Ted Sepkowski (18, 1942)
- Mike Lee (19, 1960)
- Alfredo Griffin (18, 1976)
- Julián Tavárez (20, 1993)
- CC Sabathia (20, 2001)

== See also ==
- Baseball awards
- List of Major League Baseball awards
