= Jim Bagby Sr. =

American baseball player (1889–1954)

Jim Bagby
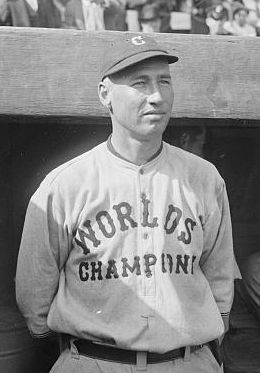
- Pitcher
- Born: October 5, 1889; Barnett, Georgia, U.S.
- Died: July 28, 1954 (aged 64); Marietta, Georgia, U.S.
- Batted: Both Threw: Right

MLB debut
- April 22, 1912, for the Cincinnati Reds

Last MLB appearance
- September 7, 1923, for the Pittsburgh Pirates

MLB statistics
- Win–loss record: 127–89
- Earned run average: 3.11
- Strikeouts: 450
- Stats at Baseball Reference

Teams
- Cincinnati Reds (1912); Cleveland Indians (1916–1922); Pittsburgh Pirates (1923)

Career highlights and awards
- World Series champion (1920); AL wins leader (1920); Cleveland Guardians Hall of Fame

James Charles Jacob Bagby Sr. (October 5, 1889 – July 28, 1954) was an American right-handed starting pitcher in Major League Baseball. Bagby was the first pitcher to hit a home run in a modern World Series, and one of the last pitchers to win over 30 games in one season (31–12 in 1920).

== Biography ==
A native of Barnett, Georgia, Bagby began his playing career with the Cincinnati Reds in 1912. His pitching records that year were not impressive, so the Reds let him go. He returned to major league baseball with the Cleveland Indians in 1916. Bagby posted 23 wins in 1917, following with 17 wins the next two campaigns.

The 1920 Indians team was powered with stars such as Tris Speaker, Stan Coveleski and Ray Caldwell, and minor-league call-up Duster Mails, Charlie Jamieson, Elmer Smith and Bagby. On September 2 of that year, Bagby won his 31st game of the season, defeating the Tigers 10–1 in a game that clinched the American League pennant for the Indians. Since that game was played, only three other pitchers have collected 30 victories in one season: Dizzy Dean, Lefty Grove and Denny McLain.

On October 10, Bagby's turn to make World Series history came in Game 5. It was a game filled with World Series firsts, as Elmer Smith became the first player in the Series history to hit a grand slam in the game's first inning. During the game's fourth inning, Bagby came to bat with two men on bases, hitting the first home run by a pitcher in modern World Series history. The following inning, another of Bagby's teammates, Bill Wambsganss, turned in the first unassisted triple play in World Series history.

In 1921, it was Bagby's pitch that Babe Ruth hit as his record-breaking 120th home run.

Before the 1923 season Bagby was traded to the Pittsburgh Pirates. He retired at the end of the season.

In a nine-season career, Bagby posted a 127–89 record with 450 strikeouts and a 3.11 ERA in 1821.2 innings pitched. In World Series play, he had a 1–1 record with an ERA of 1.80.

Bagby was a good hitting pitcher in the majors, posting a .218 batting average (144-for-660) with 69 runs, 35 doubles, 6 triples, 2 home runs, 60 RBI and drawing 32 bases on balls.

Baseball historians Bill James and Rob Neyer have ranked Bagby's screwball the ninth-best of all time.

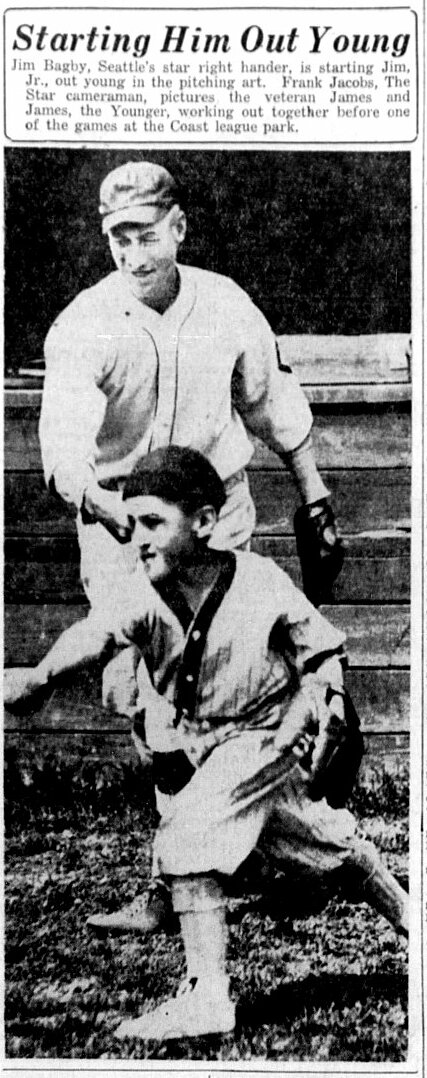
Jim Senior watching his son play ball in 1924

His son, Jim Bagby Jr., was also a major leaguer who played for the Red Sox, Indians and Pirates. The Bagbys became the first father and son to pitch in the World Series when Jim Jr. appeared for the 1946 Red Sox.

Bagby died at Keenestone Hospital in Marietta, Georgia on July 28, 1954 due to complications from a stroke in 1942 while umpiring in the Piedmont League. He was survived by his son Jim Jr. and two daughters, Mabel Moore and Elizabeth (Betty) Fincher.

== See also ==
- List of Major League Baseball annual wins leaders
