= Otto Miller =

American baseball player (1889-1962)

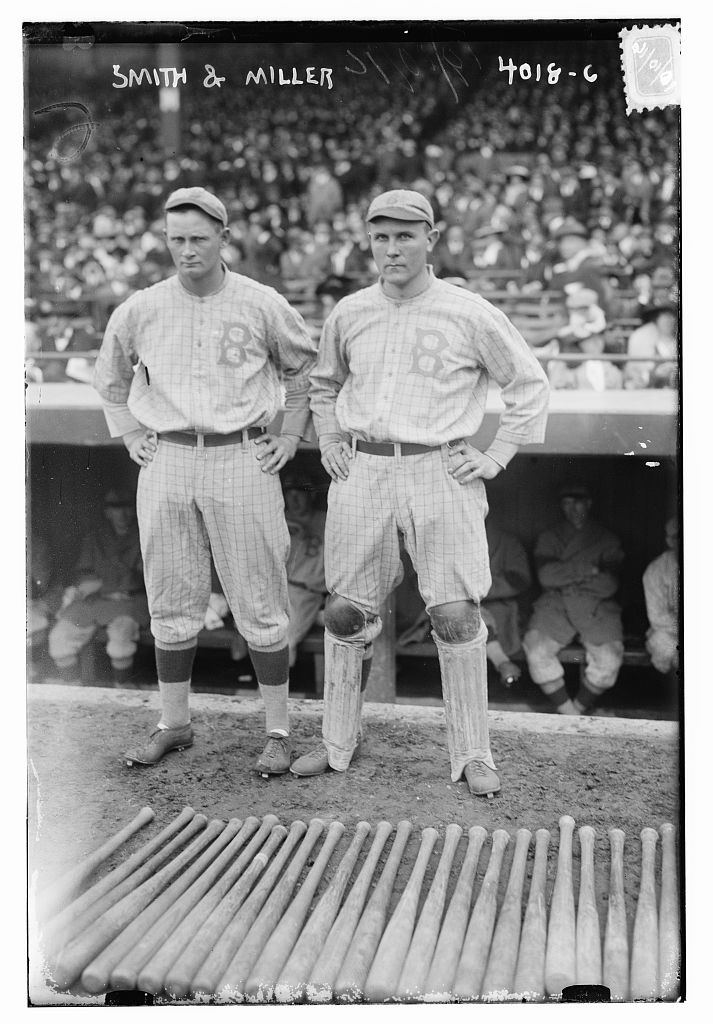
- Miller (right) and teammate Sherry Smith, with the Brooklyn Robins in 1916
- Catcher
- Born: June 1, 1889; Minden, Nebraska, U.S.
- Died: March 29, 1962 (aged 72); Brooklyn, New York, U.S.
- Batted: Right Threw: Right

MLB debut
- July 16, 1910, for the Brooklyn Superbas

Last MLB appearance
- September 4, 1922, for the Brooklyn Robins

MLB statistics
- Batting average: .245
- Home runs: 5
- Runs batted in: 231
- Stats at Baseball Reference

Teams
- Brooklyn Superbas/Dodgers/Robins (1910–1922)

Lowell Otto Miller (June 1, 1889 – March 29, 1962) was an American catcher in Major League Baseball from 1910 through 1922 for Brooklyn teams the Superbas (1910, 1913), Dodgers (1911–1912) and Robins (1914–1922). Nicknamed "Moonie", Miller batted and threw right-handed, and was listed at 6 feet 0 inches (1.83 m) and 196 pounds (89 kg).

== Career ==
In a 13-season career, Miller was a .245 hitter (695-for-2836) with five home runs and 231 RBIs in 927 games played, including 229 runs, 97 doubles, 33 triples, and 40 stolen bases. In eight postseason games, he went 3-for-22 for a .136 average.

As a catcher, he collected 3870 outs with 1053 assists and committed 135 errors in 5058 chances for a .973 fielding percentage.

His best season was 1920, when he posted a career-high .289 average and led National League catchers with .986 fielding percentage.

Miller was also a participant in a historical play in the fifth inning of Game 5 of the 1920 World Series. He was tagged by Cleveland Indians second baseman Bill Wambsganss for the third out in the only unassisted triple play in World Series history.

After his playing career ended, Miller managed the Atlanta Crackers in 1923 and was a coach for the Dodgers and Boston Red Sox.

Miller died in Brooklyn at the age of 72, when he fell from a hospital window after cataract surgery.

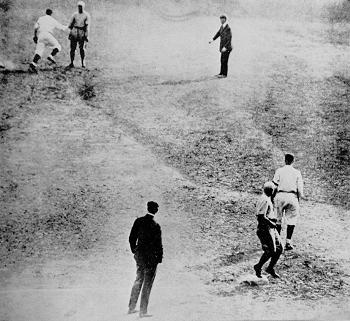
Bill Wambsganss (top left, in white) tags out Miller to complete an unassisted triple play in Game 5 of the 1920 World Series

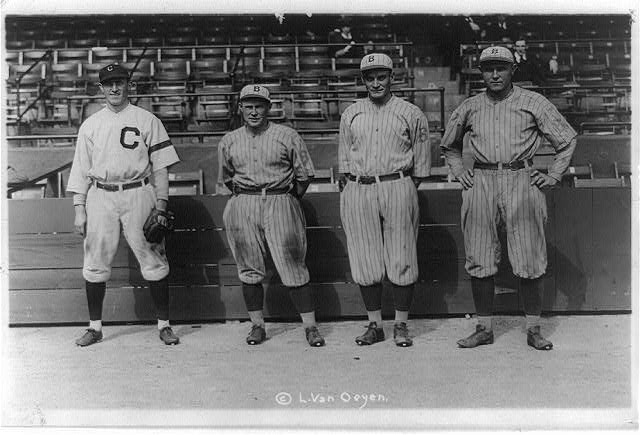
Bill Wambsganss, and his unassisted triple play victims: Pete Kilduff, Clarence Mitchell and Miller

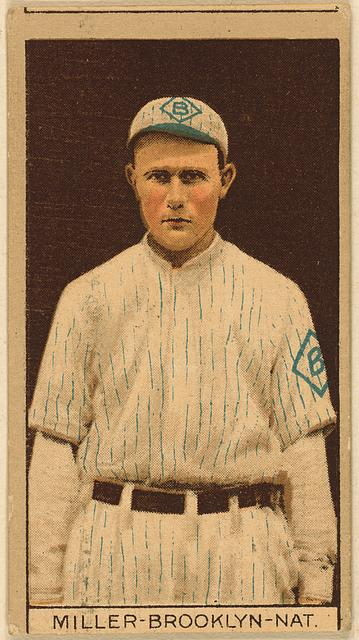
Miller's 1912 baseball card

== Postseason appearances ==
- 1916 World Series
- 1920 World Series

== See also ==
- List of Major League Baseball players who spent their entire career with one franchise
