= Jim Bagby =

Jim Bagby may refer to:

- Jim Bagby, Sr. (1889–1954), pitcher who played in MLB from 1912 through 1923
- Jim Bagby, Jr. (1916–1988), All-Star pitcher who played in MLB from 1938 through 1947
