= Jack Graney =

Canadian baseball player and announcer (1886–1978)

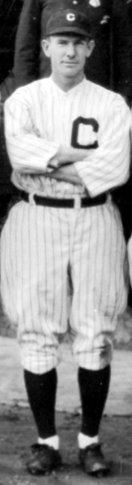
- Outfielder
- Born: June 10, 1886; St. Thomas, Ontario, Canada
- Died: April 20, 1978 (aged 91); Louisiana, Missouri, U.S.
- Batted: Left Threw: Left

MLB debut
- April 30, 1908, for the Cleveland Naps

Last MLB appearance
- June 28, 1922, for the Cleveland Indians

MLB statistics
- Batting average: .250
- Home runs: 18
- Runs batted in: 420
- Stats at Baseball Reference

Teams
- Cleveland Naps/Indians (1908, 1910–1922)

Career highlights and awards
- World Series champion (1920); Cleveland Guardians Hall of Fame

Member of the Canadian

Baseball Hall of Fame
- Induction: 1984

John Gladstone Graney (June 10, 1886 – April 20, 1978) was a Canadian professional baseball left fielder. He played in Major League Baseball for 14 seasons, all with the Cleveland Indians franchise. In his 1402-game career, Graney batted .250 (1178-for-4705) with 706 runs, 18 home runs and 420 RBI.

Following his playing days, Graney became a baseball radio broadcaster, providing play-by-play for the Indians from 1932 to 1953. He was inducted into the Cleveland Indians Distinguished Hall of Fame for non-uniformed personnel on August 11, 2012, prior to a game at Progressive Field. He is the recipient of the 2022 Ford C. Frick Award.

== Playing career ==
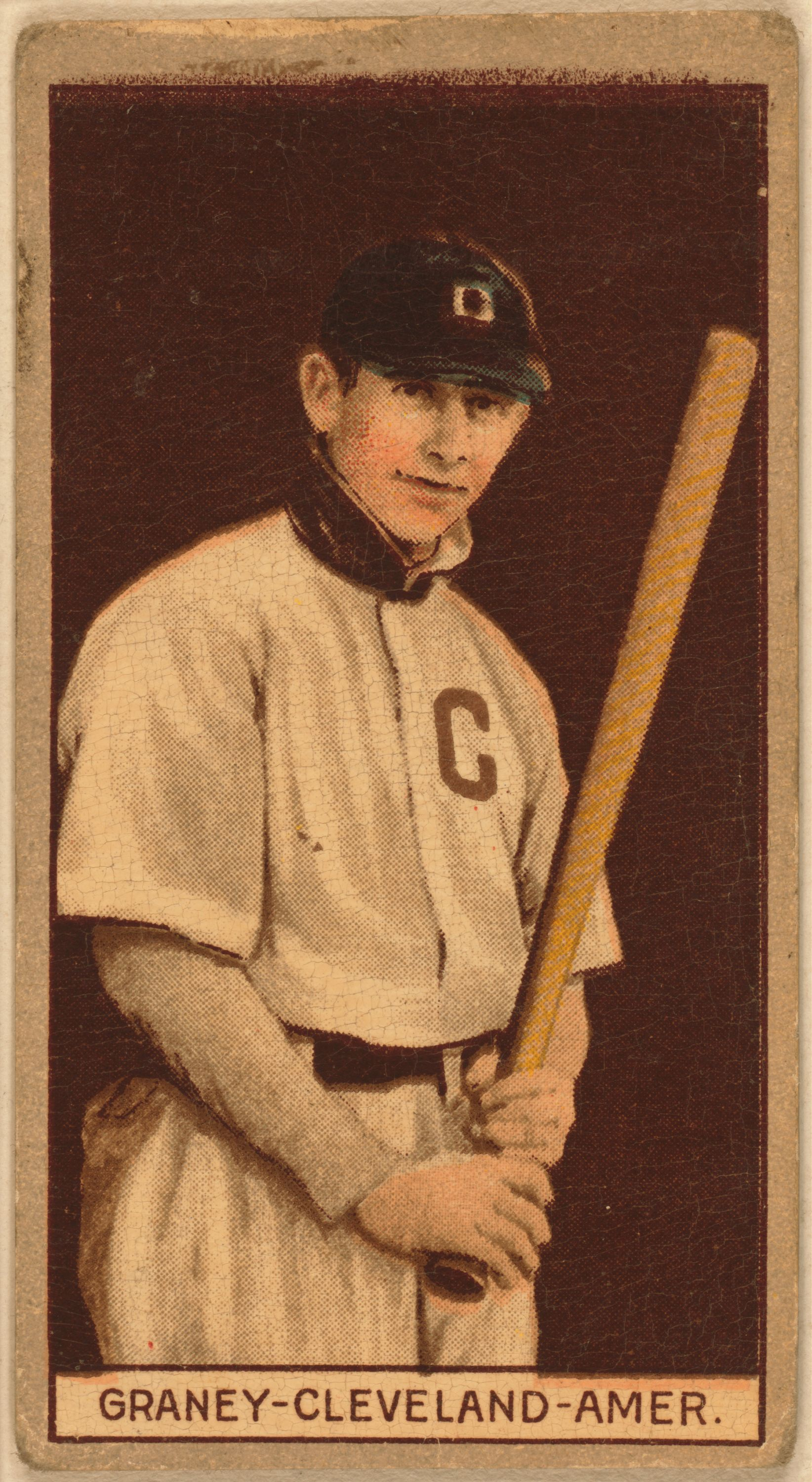

Graney began his professional baseball career as a pitcher, and remained one through the 1909 season. He pitched in two games for the Cleveland team (then known as the Naps) in 1908, and spent the rest of 1908 and 1909 with the Portland Beavers. When he was brought back up to the Naps' roster in 1910, they converted him to an outfielder, as team management did not trust his control at the major league level.

Graney was the first batter to face Babe Ruth in a major league game, on July 11, 1914. On June 26th 1916, Graney was the first ever major league player to record a plate appearance wearing a number on their uniform. Also in 1916 he led the American League with 41 doubles, scoring a career-high 106 runs, and led the league in walks in both 1917 and 1919.

On August 17, 1920, Indians shortstop Ray Chapman, Graney's roommate and best friend, died after having been struck in the head by a Carl Mays pitch in a game against the New York Yankees the day before. Graney was devastated, and suffered a breakdown upon viewing Chapman's body, having to be forcibly removed from the hospital room. Two days later during the casket viewing, Graney fainted. He was too distraught to attend the funeral and never forgave Mays for what he believed was an intentional beaning. The Indians went on to win the pennant and 1920 World Series against Brooklyn, with Graney going hitless in his only three postseason at-bats.

== Broadcasting ==
After retiring from playing, Graney became a play-by-play broadcaster for the Indians, thereby becoming the first former Major League Baseball player to become a radio broadcaster in the United States. From 1947 to 1953, Graney’s partner in the radio booth was fellow Ford C. Frick Award recipient Jimmy Dudley. Nationally, Graney broadcast the 1935 World Series for CBS radio. He also called games for the Cleveland Barons of the American Hockey League.

Graney died at age 91 in Louisiana, Missouri, on April 20, 1978.

== Legacy ==
Graney was inducted into the Canadian Baseball Hall of Fame in 1984, its second year of operation. In 1987 the Canadian Baseball Hall of Fame instituted an award in Graney's name, presented periodically to journalists deemed to have made notable contributions to promoting baseball within Canada.

In the 2022 Baseball Hall of Fame balloting, he won the Ford C. Frick Award.

The Greater Cleveland chapter of the Society for American Baseball Research is named in honor of Graney.

== See also ==
- List of Major League Baseball players from Canada
- List of Major League Baseball annual doubles leaders
- List of Major League Baseball players who spent their entire career with one franchise
