= Unassisted triple play =

Baseball play

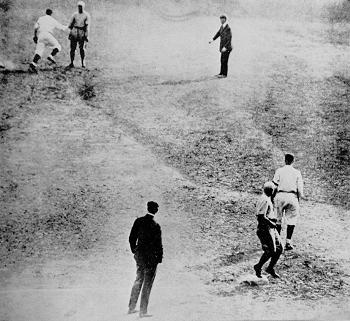
Bill Wambsganss (top left, in white) completes his unassisted triple play in Game 5 of the 1920 World Series. This marks the only time any triple play has been executed in the postseason.

In baseball, an unassisted triple play occurs when a defensive player makes all three outs by himself in one continuous play, without his teammates making any assists. Neal Ball was the first to achieve this in Major League Baseball (MLB) under modern rules, doing so on July 19, 1909. For this rare play to be possible there must be no outs in the inning and at least two runners on base, normally with the runners going on the pitch (e.g., double steal or hit-and-run). An unassisted triple play usually consists of a hard line drive hit directly at an infielder for the first out, with that same fielder then able to double off one of the base runners and tag a second, or vice versa, for the second and third outs.

In MLB, a total of fifteen players have fielded an unassisted triple play, making this feat rarer than a perfect game. Of these fifteen players, eight were shortstops, five were second basemen and two were first basemen. The Cleveland Naps/Indians/Guardians are the only franchise to have three players achieve the feat while on their roster: Neal Ball, Bill Wambsganss and Asdrúbal Cabrera. The shortest time between two unassisted triple plays occurred in May 1927, when Johnny Neun executed the feat less than 24 hours after Jimmy Cooney. Conversely, it took more than 41 seasons after Neun's play before Ron Hansen performed the feat on July 30, 1968, marking the longest span between unassisted triple plays. The most recent player to make an unassisted triple play is Eric Bruntlett, accomplishing the feat on August 23, 2009. Only Neun and Bruntlett executed unassisted triple plays that ended the game.

== Background ==
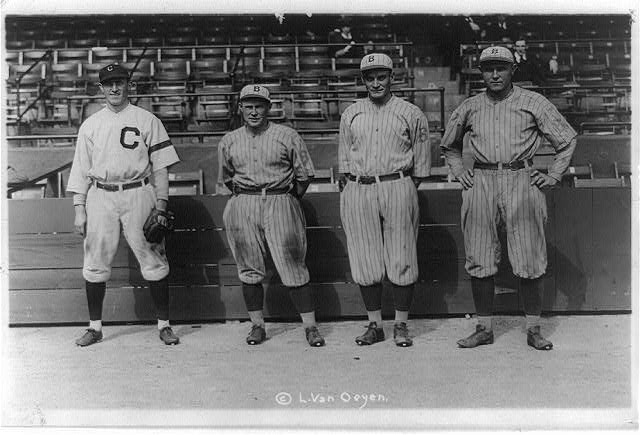
Bill Wambsganss (far left) standing alongside the victims of his unassisted triple play (from center left to far right) – Pete Kilduff, Clarence Mitchell and Otto Miller.

Most major-league unassisted triple plays have taken this form: an infielder catches a line drive (one out), steps on second base to double off a runner (two outs), and then tags another runner coming from first on the runner's way to second base (three outs). As it is easiest for this type of play to occur when the fielder is positioned between the two runners, all such plays have been accomplished by middle infielders (second basemen and shortstops).

Three other unassisted triple plays involved a reversal of the last two putouts, with an infielder tagging the runner coming from first before touching second base. Two of the three plays were performed by first basemen, who tagged out the returning runner while on the baseman’s way to second base. For example, after collecting the first two outs, Tigers' first baseman Johnny Neun ignored his shortstop's shouts to throw the ball, and instead ran to second base to get the final out himself.

The only known unassisted triple play that did not take one of these two forms occurred in the 19th century, under rules that are no longer in effect (see below). It is plausible that a third baseman could complete an unassisted triple play with runners at second and third or with bases loaded, but this has never happened in the major leagues. In the modern era, players in other positions (pitcher, catcher, outfielders) completing an unassisted triple play would require unusual confusion or mistakes by the baserunners, or an atypical defensive alignment (for example, repositioning an outfielder as a fifth infielder).

All modern unassisted triple plays have occurred with runners only on first and second, and only two of those plays—Randy Velarde's and Eric Bruntlett's—were accomplished after more than two runners had reached base during the inning. The sequence of batters leading up to Velarde's unassisted triple play was: walk, triple, hit by pitch, and error, which left baserunners on first and second after two runs had scored. The sequence of batters leading up to Bruntlett's unassisted triple play was: error, error, and single, which left baserunners on first and second after one run had scored. Both Velarde and Bruntlett committed an error in the same inning that they performed the feat.

The unassisted triple play, the perfect game, hitting four home runs in one game and five extra-base hits in a game are thus comparable in terms of rarity, but the perfect game and the home run and extra-base hit records require an extraordinary effort along with a fair amount of luck. By contrast, the unassisted triple play is essentially always a matter of luck: a combination of the right circumstances with the relatively simple effort of catching the ball and running in the proper direction with it. Troy Tulowitzki said of his feat, "It fell right in my lap", and as WGN-TV sports anchor Dan Roan commented, "That's the way these plays always happen."

== Instances ==
=== 19th century ===
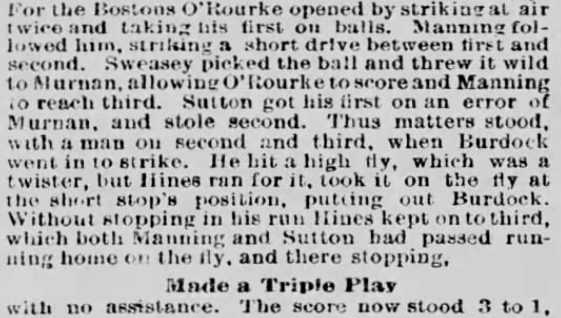
The Boston Globe account of Hines' triple play

- Paul Hines, May 8, 1878, Providence Grays (vs. Boston Red Caps) (disputed)
  - With runners on second and third, center fielder Hines caught a line drive from Jack Burdock that the runners thought was uncatchable. When he caught it, both runners had already passed third (according to The Boston Globe account of the game, printed on May 9). Hines stepped on third, which by the rules of the day meant both runners were out. To make sure, he threw the ball to Charlie Sweasy at second base. It is still debated whether this was truly an unassisted triple play. Modern rules would have required either the ball to be conveyed to second base to put out the runner who had been on that base and had not tagged up, or that runner to be tagged. According to the Society for American Baseball Research, the runner coming from second, Ezra Sutton, had not yet touched third base, which would mean that even by 19th-century rules the play was not complete until Hines threw to second, and thus the play was not unassisted. Ernest J. Lanigan's Baseball Cyclopedia, 1922, which covers professional baseball back to 1876, states on p. 157 that Neal Ball in 1909 was "the first major leaguer to make an unassisted triple play". The Sporting News Baseball Record Book, which covers records back to 1876, likewise does not list Hines' play in the section on unassisted triple plays.

=== Modern era (in MLB) ===
Player	Pos.	Date	Team	Opponent	Inning	Play	Outs in order	Ref.
Neal Ball	SS	July 19, 1909	Cleveland Naps	Boston Red Sox	2nd	Line drive, touched 2nd, tagged runner.	Amby McConnell, Heinie Wagner, Jake Stahl	
Bill Wambsganss	2B	October 10, 1920	Cleveland Indians	Brooklyn Robins	5th	Line drive, touched 2nd, tagged runner.	Clarence Mitchell, Pete Kilduff, Otto Miller	
George Burns	1B	September 14, 1923	Boston Red Sox	Cleveland Indians	2nd	Line drive, tagged runner, touched 2nd.	Frank Brower, Rube Lutzke, Riggs Stephenson	
Ernie Padgett	SS	October 6, 1923	Boston Braves	Philadelphia Phillies	4th	Line drive, touched 2nd, tagged runner.	Walter Holke, Cotton Tierney, Cliff Lee	
Glenn Wright	SS	May 7, 1925	Pittsburgh Pirates	St. Louis Cardinals	9th	Line drive, touched 2nd, tagged runner.	Jim Bottomley, Jimmy Cooney (Note: Cooney himself turned an unassisted triple play two years later.), Rogers Hornsby	
Jimmy Cooney	SS	May 30, 1927	Chicago Cubs	Pittsburgh Pirates	4th	Line drive, touched 2nd, tagged runner.	Paul Waner, Lloyd Waner, Clyde Barnhart	
Johnny Neun	1B	May 31, 1927	Detroit Tigers	Cleveland Indians	9th	Line drive, tagged runner, touched 2nd. (Note: This unassisted triple play ended the game.)	Homer Summa, Charlie Jamieson, Glenn Myatt	
Ron Hansen	SS	July 30, 1968	Washington Senators	Cleveland Indians	1st	Line drive, touched 2nd, tagged runner.	Joe Azcue, Dave Nelson, Russ Snyder	
Mickey Morandini	2B	September 20, 1992	Philadelphia Phillies	Pittsburgh Pirates	6th	Line drive, touched 2nd, tagged runner.	Jeff King, Andy Van Slyke, Barry Bonds	
John Valentin	SS	July 8, 1994	Boston Red Sox	Seattle Mariners	6th	Line drive, touched 2nd, tagged runner.	Marc Newfield, Mike Blowers, Keith Mitchell	
Randy Velarde	2B	May 29, 2000	Oakland Athletics	New York Yankees	6th	Line drive, tagged runner, touched 2nd.	Shane Spencer, Jorge Posada, Tino Martinez	
Rafael Furcal	SS	August 10, 2003	Atlanta Braves	St. Louis Cardinals	5th	Line drive, touched 2nd, tagged runner.	Woody Williams, Mike Matheny, Orlando Palmeiro	
Troy Tulowitzki	SS	April 29, 2007	Colorado Rockies	Atlanta Braves	7th	Line drive, touched 2nd, tagged runner.	Chipper Jones, Kelly Johnson, Édgar Rentería	
Asdrúbal Cabrera	2B	May 12, 2008	Cleveland Indians	Toronto Blue Jays	5th	Line drive, touched 2nd, tagged runner.	Lyle Overbay, Kevin Mench, Marco Scutaro	
Eric Bruntlett	2B	August 23, 2009	Philadelphia Phillies	New York Mets	9th	Line drive, touched 2nd, tagged runner.	Jeff Francoeur, Luis Castillo, Daniel Murphy	

== See also ==
- Walter Carlisle, who executed an unassisted triple play as a minor-league outfielder in 1911
- Randy Ready, who nearly completed an unassisted triple play as a second baseman in 1991, but threw to first base rather than tagging the baserunner for the final out
- Joey Votto, who nearly completed an unassisted triple play as a first baseman in 2021, but with the runner from third having reached home and not tagging, threw to the third baseman for the final out rather than going there himself
