= Sherry Smith =

American baseball player (1891–1949)

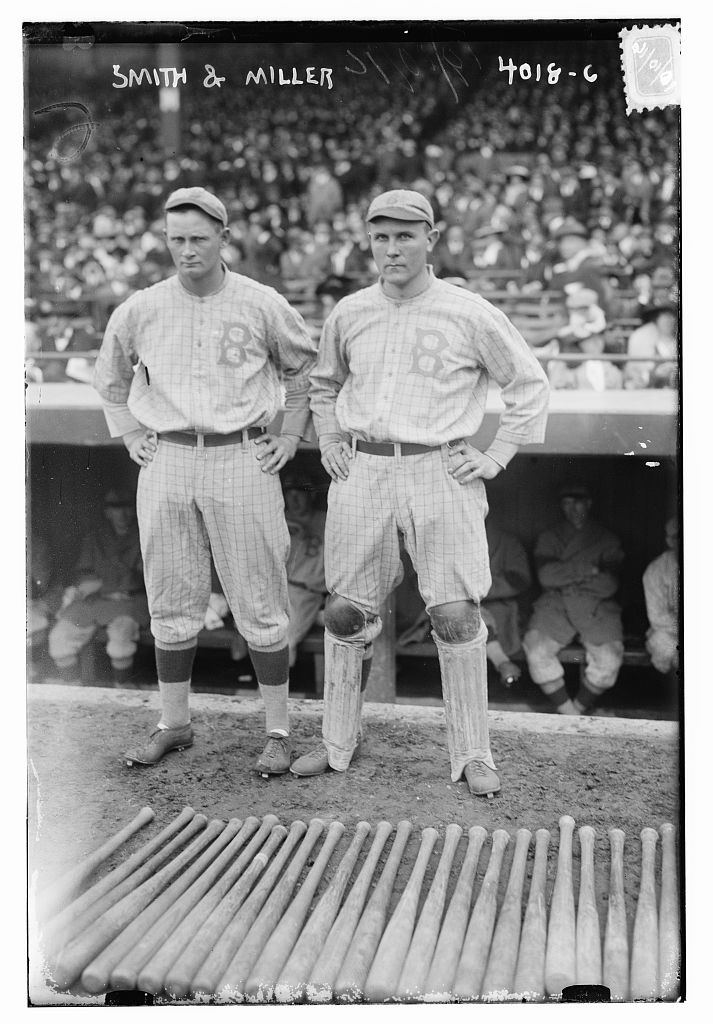
- Smith (left) and teammate Otto Miller, with the Brooklyn Robins in 1916
- Pitcher
- Born: February 18, 1891; Monticello, Georgia, U.S.
- Died: September 12, 1949 (aged 58); Reidsville, Georgia, U.S.
- Batted: Right Threw: Left

MLB debut
- May 11, 1911, for the Pittsburgh Pirates

Last MLB appearance
- July 18, 1927, for the Cleveland Indians

MLB statistics
- Win–loss record: 114–118
- Earned run average: 3.32
- Strikeouts: 428
- Stats at Baseball Reference

Teams
- Pittsburgh Pirates (1911–1912); Brooklyn Robins (1915–1917, 1919–1922); Cleveland Indians (1922–1927)

Sherrod Malone (Sherry) Smith (February 18, 1891 – September 12, 1949) was an American starting pitcher in Major League Baseball. From 1911 until 1927, he pitched for the Pittsburgh Pirates (1911–12), Brooklyn Robins (1915–17, 1919–1922) and Cleveland Indians (1922–1927). Smith batted right-handed and threw left-handed. He was born in Monticello, Georgia.

Smith was the hard-luck loser of one of the longest World Series games ever played. He pitched all the way into the 14th inning for Brooklyn, dueling with Boston's starting pitcher, Babe Ruth, in Game 2 of the 1916 World Series until the Red Sox won it 2–1. It would be his only appearance in that Series.

He made two strong starts in the 1920 World Series. Smith was the winning pitcher of Game 3 against Cleveland, throwing a three-hitter in a 2–1 victory. But despite another impressive effort in Game 6, he lost a 1–0 duel with Duster Mails, and Brooklyn ended up losing that Series in seven games.

Placed on waivers after the 1922 season, Smith was claimed by Cleveland and pitched there for several seasons. He led all American League pitchers in 1925 in complete games with 22, also leading the league that season in walks and hits allowed.

In a 14-season career, Smith posted a 114–118 record with 428 strikeouts and a 3.32 ERA in 2,052.2 innings pitched.

Smith was a good hitting pitcher in his major league career. He posted a .233 batting average (165-for-709) with 59 runs, 6 home runs and 60 RBI. He was used as a pinch-hitter five times in his career.

Smith died in Reidsville, Georgia, at age 58.
