= Bill Wambsganss =

American baseball player (1894–1985)

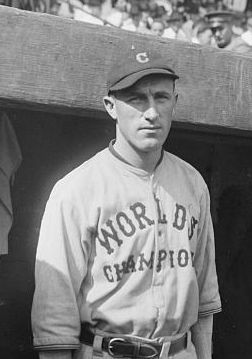
- Wambsganss in 1921
- Second baseman
- Born: March 19, 1894; Cleveland, Ohio, U.S.
- Died: December 8, 1985 (aged 91); Lakewood, Ohio, U.S.
- Batted: Right Threw: Right

MLB debut
- August 4, 1914, for the Cleveland Naps

Last MLB appearance
- September 27, 1926, for the Philadelphia Athletics

MLB statistics
- Batting average: .259
- Home runs: 7
- Runs batted in: 521
- Stats at Baseball Reference

Teams
- Cleveland Naps/Indians (1914–1923); Boston Red Sox (1924–1925); Philadelphia Athletics (1926)

Career highlights and awards
- World Series champion (1920); Unassisted triple play in 1920 World Series

William Adolf Wambsganss (March 19, 1894 – December 8, 1985) was an American second baseman in Major League Baseball. From 1914 through 1926, Wambsganss played for the Cleveland Indians, Boston Red Sox, and Philadelphia Athletics. He is best remembered for making one of the most spectacular defensive plays in World Series history, an unassisted triple play.

== Early life ==
Wambsganss was born in Cleveland, Ohio, to a family of German descent. He attended Concordia College and studied for the ministry before entering professional baseball.

== Major league career ==
In a 13-season career, Wambsganss posted a .259 batting average with seven home runs and 521 run batted in in 1492 games played. Due to his long surname, Wambsganss was often called "Wamby" by headline writers.

Wambsganss was the regular second baseman of the Cleveland Indians for ten years. Over a thirteen-year Major League career, he amassed 4,269 assists with 3,420 putouts and turned 605 double plays. He committed only 375 errors in 8,064 chances for a significant .954 fielding percentage. Batting from the second or eighth spot, Wambsganss averaged 74.2 runs per year from 1919 to 1923. He scored a career-high 89 runs in 1922. He hit a career-high .295 in 1918 and hit .290 in 1923, his last season with Cleveland. He was sent to the Boston Red Sox in the same trade that brought first baseman George Burns to the Indians.

In 1924 with Boston, Wambsganss hit .275 and collected career-highs in hits (174) and runs (93). After a sub-par season in 1925, he was sold to the Philadelphia Athletics. He finished his Major League career with the A's in 1926, batting .352 in 54 games.

=== World Series triple play ===
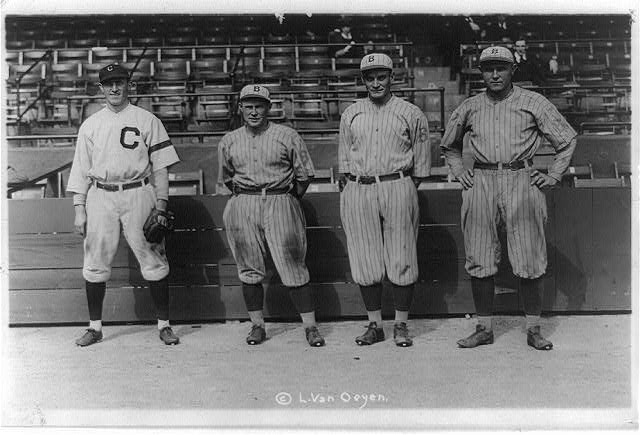
Bill Wambsganss, and his unassisted triple play victims: Pete Kilduff, Clarence Mitchell and Otto Miller. Photo by L. Van Oeyen, Library of Congress archives.

In game five of the 1920 World Series played at League Park, Wambsganss caught a fifth-inning line drive batted by Clarence Mitchell, stepped on second base to retire Pete Kilduff, and tagged Otto Miller coming from first base, to complete the only triple play, unassisted or otherwise, in World Series or postseason history.

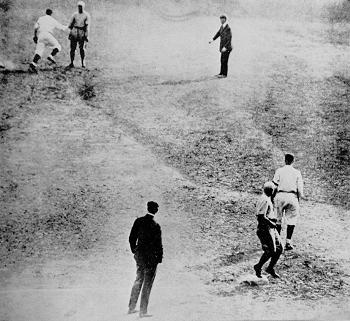
Wambsganss (top left, in white) tags out Otto Miller to complete an unassisted triple play in Game 5 of the 1920 World Series

Earlier in the game, Wambsganss' teammate Elmer Smith hit the first grand slam in World Series history off Brooklyn Robins pitcher Burleigh Grimes, in the first inning with none out, over the high screen in right field. The historic blast scored Charlie Jamieson, Wambsganss, Tris Speaker, and Smith. Brooklyn fell to the Indians in an 8–1 loss. Cleveland winning pitcher Jim Bagby helped himself by hitting a three-run home run in the third, into temporary bleachers built across center field. It was the first home run hit by a pitcher in modern World Series history.

After the World Series, Cleveland fans presented Wambsganss with a medal to commemorate the unassisted triple play. The medal was lost the following April while Wambsganss was traveling aboard a train.

== Post-MLB career ==
After his last year in the Major Leagues, Wambsganss played for Triple-A Kansas City of the American Association. After coaching New Orleans of the Southern League in 1930, he returned to the Kansas City club as manager in 1931.

Additionally, he managed for four seasons in the All-American Girls Professional Baseball League (AAGPBL) for the Fort Wayne Daisies (1945–46) and the Muskegon Lassies (1947–48). In November 1988, Wambsganss and the rest of the AAGPBL received recognition when the Baseball Hall of Fame and Museum in Cooperstown, New York dedicated a permanent display to the entire league. The gymnasium at Concordia Theological Seminary is named in honor of him.

== Later life and legacy ==
When interviewed in the 1960s by Lawrence Ritter for the classic 1966 oral history The Glory of Their Times, Wambsganss recalled: "Funny thing, I played in the big leagues for 13 years, 1914 through 1926, and the only thing that anybody seems to remember is that once I made an unassisted triple play in a World Series. Many don't even remember the team I was on, or the position I played, or anything. Just Wambsganss-unassisted triple play! You'd think I was born on the day before and died on the day after."

Wambsganss died of heart failure in Lakewood, Ohio, on December 8, 1985. He was 91 years old. Wambsganss was buried at Calvary Cemetery in Cleveland.

In the 1958 film Teacher's Pet, Clark Gable and Gig Young argue whether Wambsganss' triple play took place in the 1920 or 1921 World Series.

In May 2023, after the unusual surname of Succession character Tom Wambsgans had resulted in speculation on social media that the show's writers might have named the character after Wambsganss, Succession executive producer Frank Rich characterized any connection to Wambsganss as unintentional.
