= George Burns (first baseman) =

American baseball player (1893–1978)

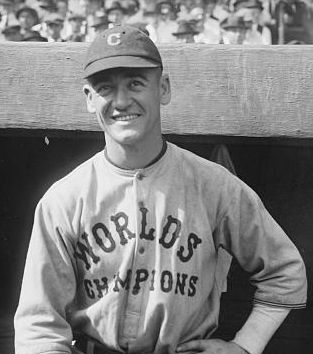
- First baseman
- Born: January 31, 1893; Niles, Ohio, U.S.
- Died: January 7, 1978 (aged 84); Kirkland, Washington, U.S.
- Batted: Right Threw: Right

MLB debut
- April 14, 1914, for the Detroit Tigers

Last MLB appearance
- September 26, 1929, for the Philadelphia Athletics

MLB statistics
- Batting average: .307
- Hits: 2,018
- Home runs: 72
- Runs batted in: 954
- Stats at Baseball Reference

Teams
- Detroit Tigers (1914–1917); Philadelphia Athletics (1918–1920); Cleveland Indians (1920–1921); Boston Red Sox (1922–1923); Cleveland Indians (1924–1928); New York Yankees (1928–1929); Philadelphia Athletics (1929)

Career highlights and awards
- 3× World Series champion (1920, 1928, 1929); AL MVP (1926)

George Henry Burns (January 31, 1893 – January 7, 1978), nicknamed "Tioga George", was an American first baseman in Major League Baseball (MLB) who played for five American League (AL) teams from 1914 to 1929.

One of the league's top right-handed batters of the 1920s, he was named the AL Most Valuable Player in 1926 with the Cleveland Indians after batting .358 and setting a major league record with 64 doubles. A career .307 hitter, he retired with 2,018 hits, then the third-highest total by an AL right-handed hitter. His 1,671 games at first base were the most by an AL right-handed player until 1940; he still ranks third in league history.

== Career ==
Born in Niles, Ohio, Burns was a line drive hitter and a solid defensive first baseman who hit .300 or better in all but one of his full seasons between 1918 and 1927. After four unremarkable seasons with the Detroit Tigers (1914–17), he was acquired by the Philadelphia Athletics in 1918. In his first season with the team he hit .352, surpassed only by the .382 of Detroit's Ty Cobb, and led the AL in hits (178) and total bases (236) while also setting a league record with 109 double plays at first base (Earl Sheely surpassed the mark three years later). After slipping to .296 in 1919, he was sent to the Indians in May 1920.

During the 1920 regular season, Burns was stuck behind regular first baseman Doc Johnston; but his play revived in the World Series, in which he and Johnston were platooned by manager Tris Speaker. Burns started Game 6, and with the Indians up 3–2 in the Series and no score in the sixth inning, Burns doubled home Speaker with the only run of the game as the Indians edged the Brooklyn Dodgers 1–0 to take a 4–2 lead in the nine-game series. Cleveland won again the next day, capturing the first Series title for the franchise.

During the season, after shortstop Ray Chapman died one day after being hit by a pitch, Burns had welcomed newly acquired Joe Sewell by giving him one of his own bats; Sewell went on to use the same bat, which he called "Black Betsy", throughout a 14-year career in which he struck out only 114 times.

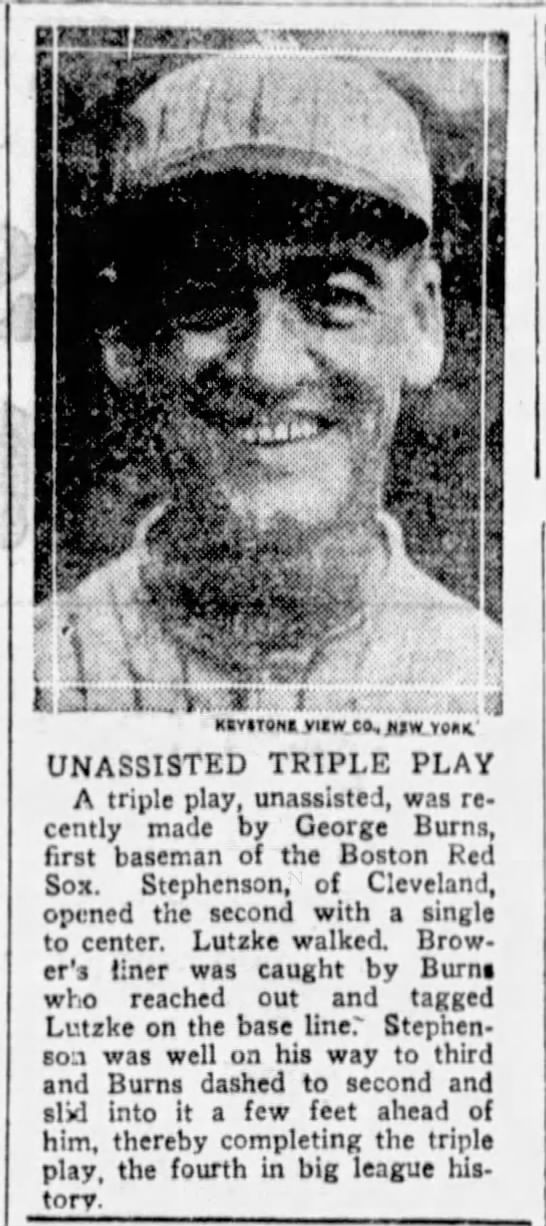
Newspaper account of Burns's unassisted triple play

After the 1921 season, in which he and Johnston again competed for playing time, he was traded to the Boston Red Sox, and batted .306 and .328 in 1922 and 1923, finishing second in the league in doubles the latter year. He got the first hit ever in Yankee Stadium in 1923, and on September 14 of that year against the Indians, Burns turned an unassisted triple play – only the fourth in major league history (third by modern-era baseball rules), and the first by a first baseman. In the second inning, he caught Frank Brower's line drive, tagged Walt Lutzke off first base and actually ran to second base, sliding in before Riggs Stephenson could return from third. The following January, he was traded back to the Indians – notably, in a deal which involved Bill Wambsganss, who had turned the only unassisted triple play in World Series history as Burns's teammate in 1920.

Back with Cleveland, Burns hit over .300 in each of the next four seasons and was regularly among the league leaders in doubles. On June 19, 1924, Burns went 6-for-6 against the Detroit Tigers, the Indians winning 16-5. He recorded 3 doubles in the game. In 1926 he broke Speaker's 1923 major league mark of 59 doubles; his record was broken in 1931 by Earl Webb, though Burns still retains a share of the mark for right-handed hitters, along with Joe Medwick. Burns also led the league in hits (216) for the second time, and was second in the league in runs batted in (RBIs), behind Babe Ruth. For his accomplishments that year he was named the MVP, becoming the first Cleveland player to be so honored, and in May 1927 he was presented with an automobile and a silver bat containing $1,150 during a day honoring him. In 1928 he broke Stuffy McInnis's AL record of 1,608 games at first base, though Joe Judge passed him later that year; his AL mark for right-handed players was broken in 1940 by Jimmie Foxx, and he still trails only Foxx and George Scott in league history.

After being sent to the New York Yankees in late 1928, Burns appeared in only 13 games for the team before rejoining the Athletics in 1929. He ended his career with an unusual pinch-hitting appearance in the 1929 World Series, in which he won his second championship. In the fourth game, he was sent in to bat for the pitcher with the Athletics down 8–3, and was retired twice in a 10-run inning that resulted in a victory. In his 16-season career, Burns hit 72 home runs with 954 RBIs in 1866 games played. With 2,018 hits, he then trailed only Nap Lajoie (2,523) and Harry Heilmann (2,499) in AL history among right-handed hitters; his 444 career doubles ranked eighth in major league history among right-handers, and fifth among all AL players. With 110 times being hit by a pitch, he ranked second in the AL to Kid Elberfeld.

Following his major league career he played for five seasons in the Pacific Coast League, leading the league in RBIs in 1932, and managed in the minors until 1939. He left baseball to become a deputy sheriff in the Seattle area (King County) until his retirement in 1967.

Burns died on January 7, 1978 at Evergreen Hospital in Kirkland at age 84, and was buried at Calvary Cemetery in Seattle.

== See also ==
- List of Major League Baseball career hits leaders
- List of Major League Baseball doubles records
- List of Major League Baseball career doubles leaders
- List of Major League Baseball annual doubles leaders
- List of Major League Baseball career stolen bases leaders
- List of Major League Baseball single-game hits leaders

Records
Preceded by Tris Speaker	Single season doubles record holders 1926–1930	Succeeded by Earl Webb
