= Clarence Mitchell (baseball) =

American baseball player (1891–1963)

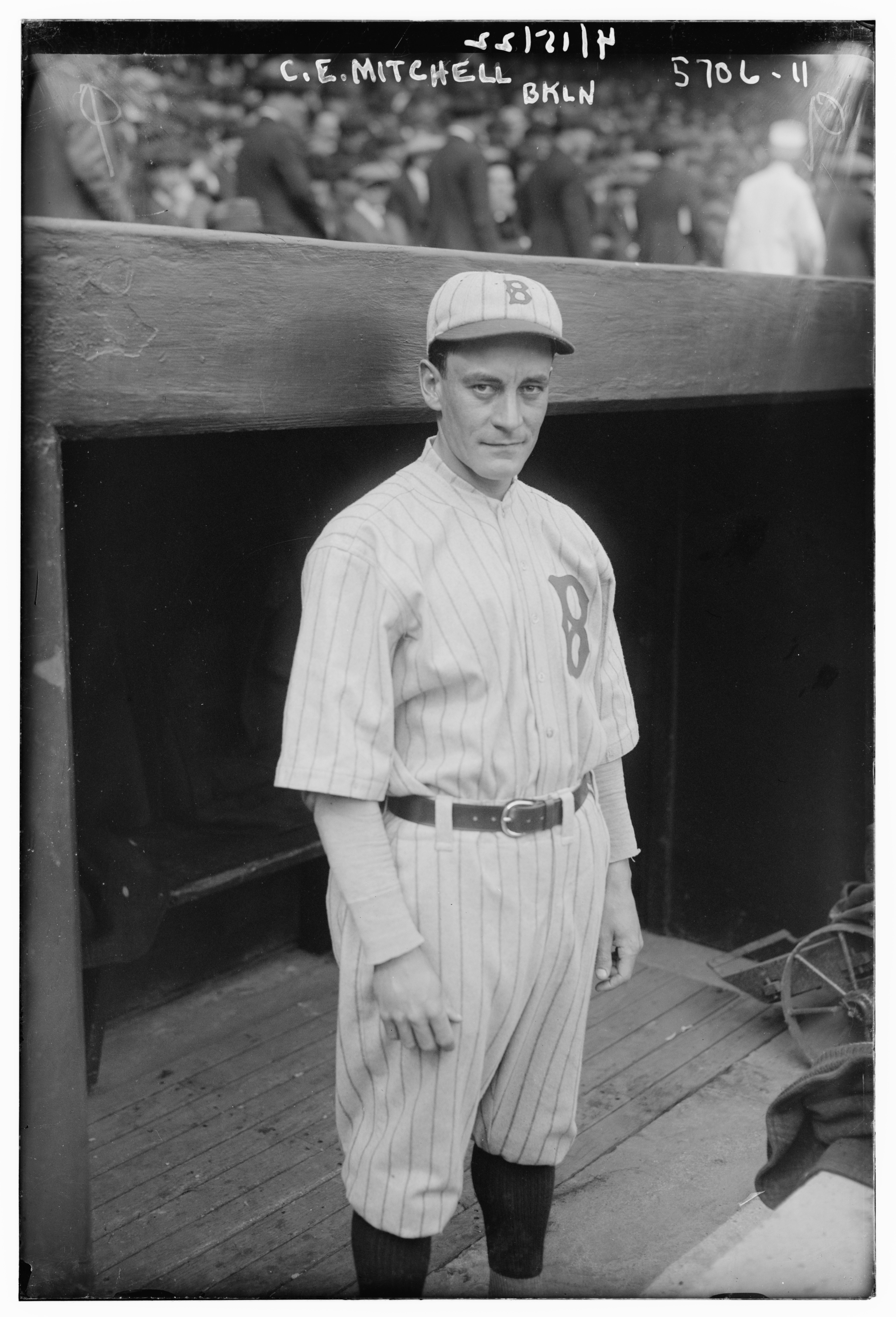
- Pitcher
- Born: February 22, 1891; Franklin, Nebraska, U.S.
- Died: November 6, 1963 (aged 72); Grand Island, Nebraska, U.S.
- Batted: Left Threw: Left

MLB debut
- June 2, 1911, for the Detroit Tigers

Last MLB appearance
- June 21, 1932, for the New York Giants

MLB statistics
- Win–loss record: 125–139
- Earned run average: 4.12
- Strikeouts: 543
- Stats at Baseball Reference

Teams
- As player: Detroit Tigers (1911); Cincinnati Reds (1916–1917); Brooklyn Robins (1918–1922); Philadelphia Phillies (1923–1928); St. Louis Cardinals (1928–1930); New York Giants (1930–1932); As coach: New York Giants (1932–1933)

Career highlights and awards
- World Series champion (1933)

Clarence Elmer Mitchell (February 22, 1891 – November 6, 1963) was an American Major League Baseball pitcher.

== Background ==
He played in the majors from 1911 to 1932 for the Detroit Tigers, Cincinnati Reds, New York Giants, Brooklyn Robins, Philadelphia Phillies and St. Louis Cardinals.

Mitchell was known for throwing the spitball, and he was one of the 17 pitchers allowed to continue throwing the pitch after it was outlawed in 1920.

He was a very good hitting pitcher in his 18-year major league career, posting a .252 batting average (324-for-1287) with 138 runs, 7 home runs, 133 RBI and drawing 72 bases on balls. He drove in 10 or more runs in six seasons, with a season high of 28 in 1922 as a member of the Brooklyn Robins. In 1919, he batted a career high .367 (18-for-49) for Brooklyn. He was also used in the outfield and at first base.

== Records ==
On October 10, 1920, in Game 5 of the 1920 World Series, Mitchell made history when, with men on first and second and no outs, he hit a rising liner that Cleveland Indians second baseman Bill Wambsganss caught. Wambsganss was able to double up the lead runner, Pete Kilduff, who was still running toward third, then tagged out Otto Miller, who had come down from first base. Mitchell is the only player in Major League history to hit into an unassisted triple play in a World Series. In his next at bat, Mitchell hit into a double play, making him responsible for five outs in two consecutive trips to the plate, another World Series record.

Mitchell also has the distinction of being the last legal lefthanded spitball pitcher.

After being released from the majors after the 1932 season at age 41, he played several more years in the minors, including three years in the Pacific Coast League for the Mission Reds.
