= Elmer Smith (baseball) =

American baseball player (1892–1984)

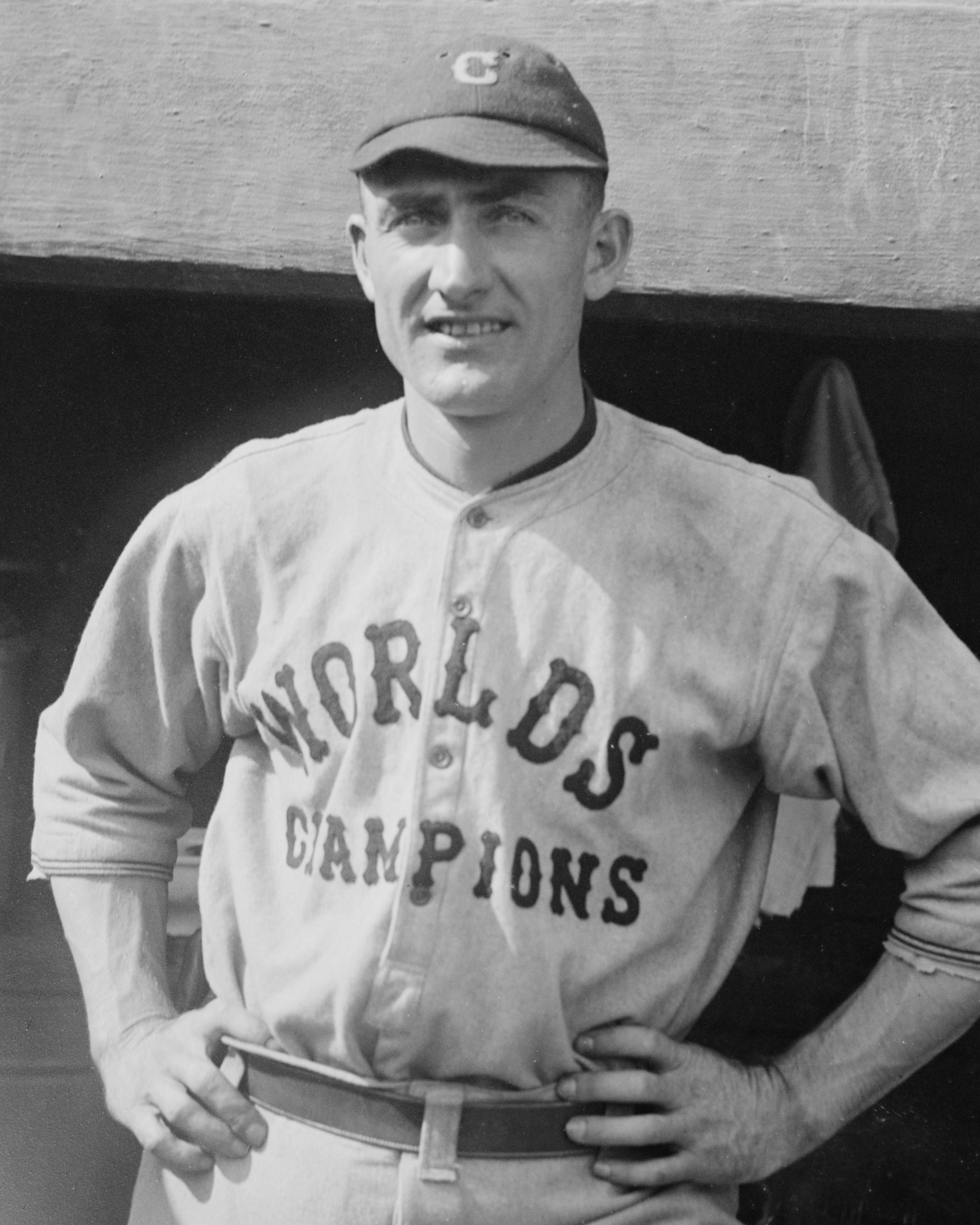
- Outfielder
- Born: September 21, 1892; Sandusky, Ohio, U.S.
- Died: August 3, 1984 (aged 91); Columbia, Kentucky, U.S.
- Batted: Left Threw: Right

MLB debut
- September 20, 1914, for the Cleveland Naps

Last MLB appearance
- September 27, 1925, for the Cincinnati Reds

MLB statistics
- Batting average: .276
- Home runs: 70
- Runs batted in: 541
- Stats at Baseball Reference

Teams
- Cleveland Naps/Indians (1914–1916); Washington Senators (1916–1917); Cleveland Indians (1917–1921); Boston Red Sox (1922); New York Yankees (1922–1923); Cincinnati Reds (1925)

Career highlights and awards
- 2× World Series champion (1920, 1923)

Elmer John Smith (September 21, 1892 – August 3, 1984) was an American professional baseball outfielder who played in Major League Baseball for the Cleveland Indians (1914–16, 1917 and 1919–21), Washington Senators (1916–17), Boston Red Sox (1922), New York Yankees (1922–23), and Cincinnati Reds (1925).

Smith was a member of the 1920 World Series champions with Cleveland and the 1923 World Series champions with New York. He hit a grand slam in Game 5 of the 1920 World Series, which was the first in World Series history.

== Early life ==
Smith was born in Sandusky, Ohio. His family moved to Milan, Ohio, when he was two years old. He had five siblings. Smith played baseball, football, and basketball in high school as well as for semi-professional sports teams near Milan.

== Career ==
=== Early career (1911–1917) ===
Smith made his professional baseball debut with the Adrian Yeggs of the Class C Southern Michigan League in 1911, and returned to Adrian for the 1912 season. He began the 1913 season with the Duluth White Sox of the Class C Northern League.

The Cleveland Naps purchased Smith from Duluth in July 1913. He finished the 1913 season with the Toledo Mud Hens of the Class AA American Association. Smith began the 1914 season with the Waterbury Contenders of the Class B Eastern Association, and made his major league debut with Cleveland, now known as the Indians, on September 20, 1914. He had a .321 batting average in 13 games played.

In 1915, Smith competed with Nemo Leibold to be the starting centerfielder for Cleveland. Leibold won the job, but Smith forced his way into Cleveland's batting lineup, with Shoeless Joe Jackson moving from right field to first base. The acquisition of Braggo Roth reduced Smith's playing time during the 1916 season. On August 18, 1916, Cleveland traded Smith and Joe Leonard to the Washington Senators for Joe Boehling and Danny Moeller. In 1917, Smith became a bench player, as the Senators started Clyde Milan, Sam Rice, and Mike Menosky in the outfield.

=== Peak years (1917–1923) ===
On June 13, 1917. Cleveland purchased Smith from Washington for $4,000 ($98,171 in current dollar terms). He finished the 1917 season as a bench player. Smith did not play during the 1918 season, as he served as a sergeant in the United States Army. Before the 1919 season, the Indians traded Roth, and Smith reclaimed a starting position in their outfield. In 1920, he batted .316, with 12 home runs and 103 RBIs, which were the 10th-most in baseball. Smith batted .308 with one home run in the 1920 World Series. In the first inning of Game 5, Smith hit a grand slam off of Burleigh Grimes; it was the first grand slam in World Series history. Cleveland won the game and the series. On September 4 and 5, 1921, Smith recorded extra base hits in seven consecutive at bats, setting a new major league record. Earl Sheely broke the record with eight consecutive extra base hits in 1926.

After the 1921 season, Cleveland traded Smith, George Burns, and Joe Harris to the Boston Red Sox for Stuffy McInnis. Starting the 1922 season with Boston, Smith batted .286 in 73 games. On July 23, 1922, the Red Sox traded Smith and Joe Dugan to the New York Yankees for Chick Fewster, Elmer Miller, Johnny Mitchell, a player to be named later and $50,000 ($939,264 in current dollar terms). Smith became a bench player for the Yankees, pinch hitting for Babe Ruth and Bob Meusel. The Yankees won the American League pennant in 1922, but lost the 1922 World Series to the New York Giants; Smith batted 0-for-2 with two strikeouts in the series. He was a member of the 1923 World Series champions, as the Yankees defeated the Giants, though he did not play in the series.

=== Later career (1924–1932) ===
On January 7, 1924, the Yankees traded Smith, a player to be named later, along with $50,000 ($917,379 in current dollar terms) to the Louisville Colonels for Earle Combs In 1924, Smith hit .334 with 28 home runs for Louisville. The Cincinnati Reds acquired Smith from Louisville before the 1925 season. Smith played in 96 games for Cincinnati and tied with Edd Roush for the team lead for home runs with eight.

After the 1925 season, the Reds sold Smith to the Portland Beavers of the Pacific Coast League (PCL). Smith led the PCL in home runs with 46 in 1926 and with 40 in 1927. He played for Portland into the 1928 season, when they sold him to the Hollywood Stars in September 1928. After the 1928 season, the Stars sold Smith to Louisville. Smith played for Louisville in 1929. He began the 1930 season with the Buffalo Bisons of the International League, and in May was traded to the Minneapolis Millers of the American Association for Hack Miller. He opened the 1931 season with Minneapolis, but was released in April. In May, he played for the New Orleans Pelicans of the Southern Association, and he joined the Springfield Senators in the Illinois–Indiana–Iowa League in June. Smith played for the Fort Wayne Chiefs of the Central League in 1932.

In his major league career, Smith had a .276 batting average, 70 home runs, and 540 RBIs.

== Personal life ==
Smith married Ruth (née Hanrath) in 1921.

After his baseball career, Smith worked for the Cleveland Trencher Company, an engineering firm, until 1959. He and his wife retired to Shaker Heights, Ohio, her hometown. They moved to Columbia, Kentucky, in the 1970s.

Smith died in Columbia on August 3, 1984, at age 91.

In 2011, Smith was inducted into the PCL Hall of Fame.
