= Rube Lutzke =

American baseball player (1897–1938)

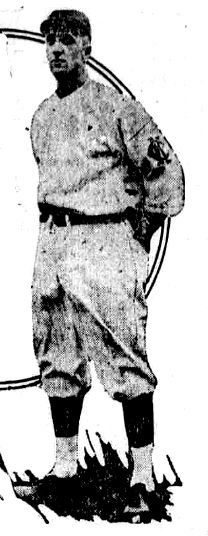
- Rube Lutzke
- Third baseman
- Born: November 17, 1897; Milwaukee, Wisconsin, U.S.
- Died: March 6, 1938 (aged 40); Granville, Wisconsin, U.S.
- Batted: Right Threw: Right

MLB debut
- April 18, 1923, for the Cleveland Indians

Last MLB appearance
- September 13, 1927, for the Cleveland Indians

MLB statistics
- Batting average: .249
- Home runs: 4
- Runs batted in: 222
- Stats at Baseball Reference

Teams
- Cleveland Indians (1923–1927)

Rube Lutzke (November 17, 1897 – March 6, 1938) was an American professional baseball player. He played from 1923 to 1927 with the Cleveland Indians. He primarily played third base.

According to the Saturday May 4, 1920 Montreal Standard (p. 30) Lutzke is notable for betting that he could slide down a rope from a fifth floor room of the team's hotel. He won the bet, but burnt his hands on the rope, making him temporarily unable to play. The team management sent him to the minor leagues.

In 572 games over five seasons, Lutzke posted a .249 batting average (468-for-1876) with 216 runs, 4 home runs, 222 RBI and 179 bases on balls. He finished his career with a .947 fielding percentage.
