= Ray Chapman =

American baseball player (1891–1920)

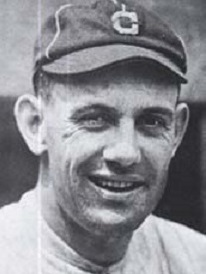
- Shortstop
- Born: January 15, 1891; Beaver Dam, Kentucky, U.S.
- Died: August 17, 1920 (aged 29); Manhattan, New York, U.S.
- Batted: Right Threw: Right

MLB debut
- August 30, 1912, for the Cleveland Indians

Last MLB appearance
- August 16, 1920, for the Cleveland Indians

MLB statistics
- Batting average: .278
- Home runs: 17
- Runs batted in: 364
- Stats at Baseball Reference

Teams
- Cleveland Indians (1912–1920)

Career highlights and awards
- Cleveland Guardians Hall of Fame

Raymond Johnson Chapman (January 15, 1891 – August 17, 1920) was an American professional baseball player. He spent his entire career as a shortstop for the Cleveland Indians of the American League.

Chapman was hit in the head by a pitch thrown by pitcher Carl Mays and died 12 hours later. He is the only person to die directly from an injury received while playing in a Major League Baseball (MLB) game. His death occurred only a few months after the introduction of rules banning spitballs and requiring umpires to replace dirty, discolored balls. Chapman's death was also one of the examples cited to justify the wearing of batting helmets, although their use was not required until over 30 years later.

== Early life ==
Ray Chapman was born to Robert and Blanche Chapman (née Johnson) in Beaver Dam, Kentucky, and raised in Herrin, Illinois.

== Career ==
Chapman broke into the major leagues in 1912 with the Cleveland team, then known as the Naps.

Chapman led the American League in runs scored and walks in 1918. A top-notch bunter, Chapman is sixth on the all-time list for sacrifice hits and holds the single-season record with 67 in 1917. Only Stuffy McInnis has more career sacrifices as a right-handed batter. Chapman was also an excellent shortstop, who led the league in assists once. He batted .300 or better three times and led the Indians in stolen bases four times. In 1917, he set a team record of 52 stolen bases, which stood until 1980. He was hitting .303 with 97 runs scored when he died. He was one of the few players whom Ty Cobb considered a friend.

Conjecture indicated that 1920 was going to be Chapman's last year as a professional baseball player. Shortly before the season began, Chapman married Kathleen Daly, who was the daughter of a prominent Cleveland businessman. Chapman had indicated he was going to retire to devote himself to the family business into which he was marrying, as well as to begin a family.

== Death ==
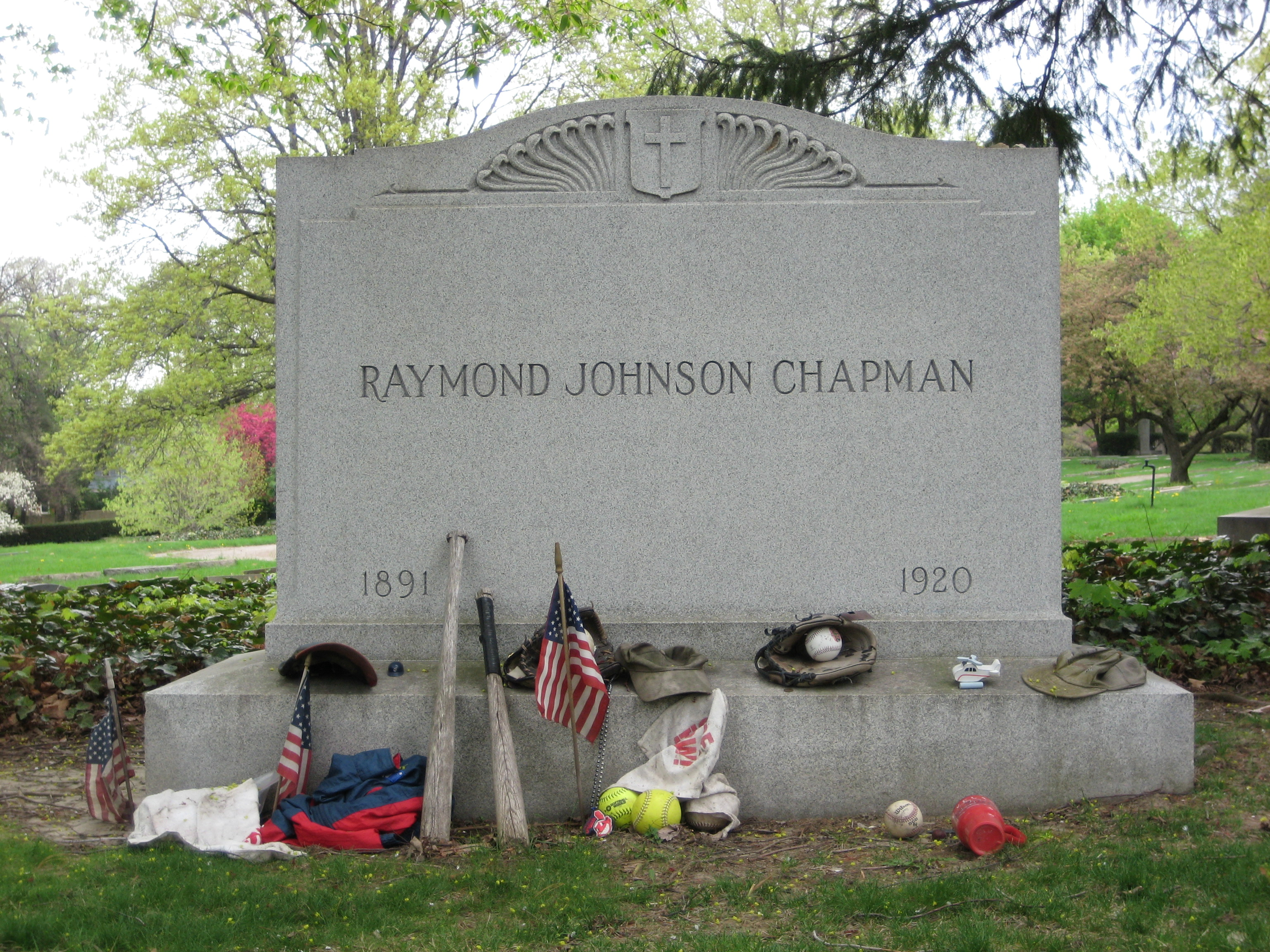
Ray Chapman's grave

On August 16, 1920, while at bat, Chapman was struck in the head and killed by a pitch thrown by Carl Mays during a game against the New York Yankees at the Polo Grounds. At the time, pitchers commonly dirtied balls with soil, licorice, and tobacco juice, and otherwise scuffed, sandpapered, scarred, cut, or spiked them, giving a "misshapen, earth-colored ball that traveled through the air erratically, tended to soften in the later innings, and as it came over the plate, was very hard to see." Mays threw with a submarine delivery, and it was late afternoon. Eyewitnesses recounted that Chapman did not react to the pitch at all, presumably unable to see it. The sound of the ball striking Chapman's skull was so loud that Mays thought it had hit the end of Chapman's bat; he fielded the ball and threw to first base.

Home plate umpire Tommy Connolly, noticing that Chapman was bleeding from his left ear, screamed towards the stands for a doctor. Tris Speaker, who had been on deck, rushed to Chapman, as did several players from each team. Carl Mays merely stood on the mound. Chapman tried to walk, but his knees buckled. As he was helped off the field by his teammates, he mumbled "I'm all right; tell Mays not to worry... ring....Katie's ring," before falling unconscious. Chapman was taken to St. Lawrence Hospital, a short distance from the Polo Grounds, where he was diagnosed with a depressed skull fracture. Despite emergency surgery to relieve swelling on his brain, Chapman died at 4:40 am the next day. His pregnant wife Katie, summoned from Cleveland by phone, arrived at 10:00 am and fainted upon learning he had died.

Thousands of mourners attended Chapman's funeral at the Cathedral of St. John the Evangelist in Cleveland, and he was buried at Lake View Cemetery.

Cleveland players wore black armbands for the remainder of the season. The Indians won the 1920 World Series and dedicated their victory to Chapman.

== Honors ==
A bronze plaque was designed in Chapman's memory, funded by donations from fans, was hung at League Park and was moved to Cleveland Stadium when the Indians moved there in 1946. Sometime in the early 1970s, however, it was removed for unknown reasons. In 2007, it was refurbished and made part of Progressive Field's Heritage Park, which includes the Cleveland Guardians Hall of Fame and other exhibits from the team's history. Chapman had been inducted into the team Hall of Fame in 2006, part of the first new induction class since 1972. A baseball field is dedicated to Ray Chapman in his hometown of Beaver Dam, Kentucky.

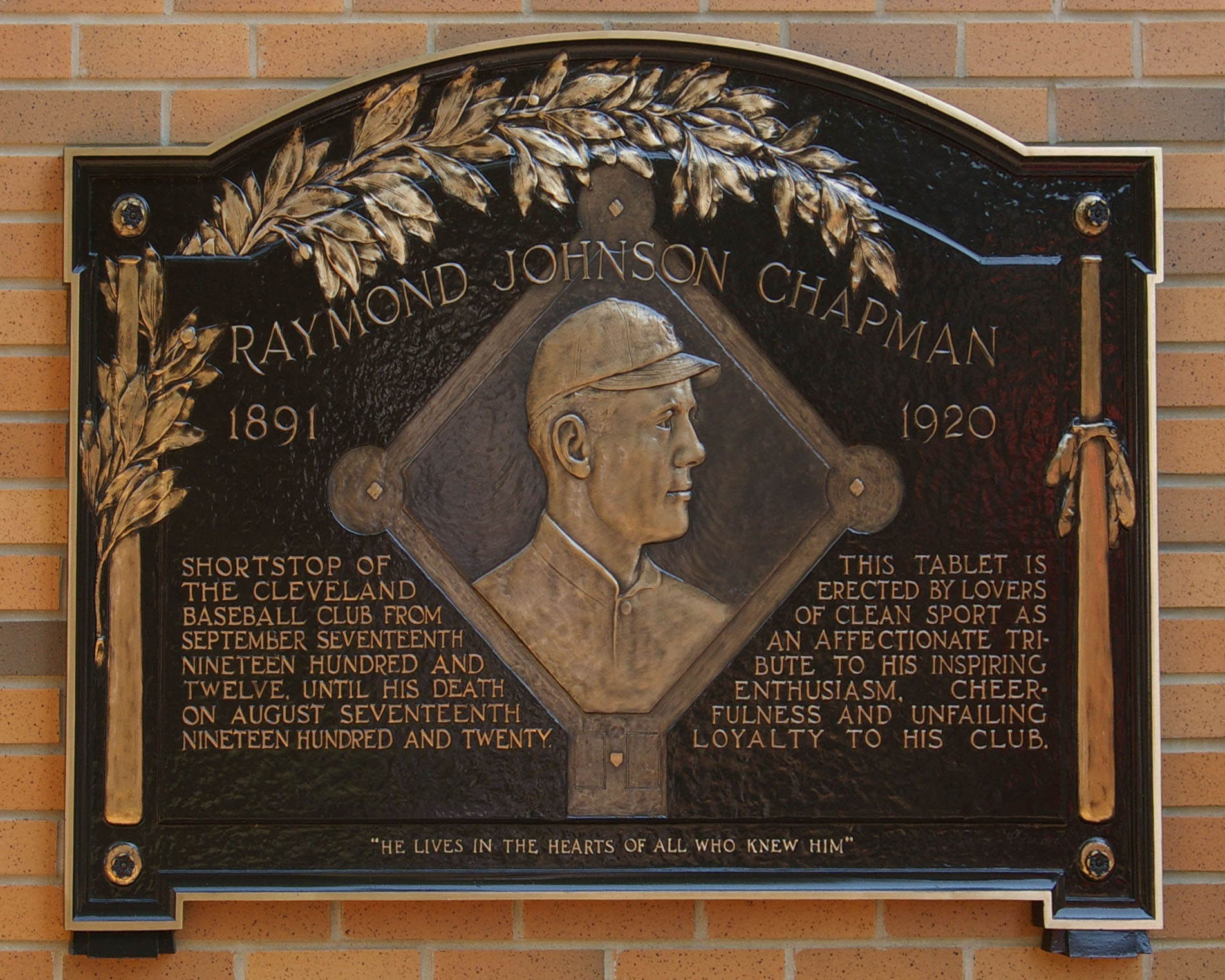
Restored Chapman plaque at Heritage Park in Progressive Field

== See also ==
- List of baseball players who died during their careers
- John Dodge, who was killed by a pitched ball during a minor league game
- Phillip Hughes, Australian cricketer killed by a ball during play in 2014
