= Pete Kilduff =

American baseball player (1893–1930)

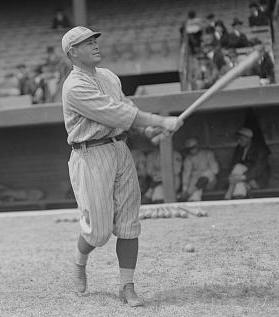
- Second baseman
- Born: April 4, 1893; Weir, Kansas, U.S.
- Died: February 14, 1930 (aged 36); Pittsburg, Kansas, U.S.
- Batted: Right Threw: Right

MLB debut
- April 18, 1917, for the New York Giants

Last MLB appearance
- September 28, 1921, for the Brooklyn Robins

MLB statistics
- Batting average: .270
- Home runs: 4
- Runs batted in: 160
- Stats at Baseball Reference

Teams
- New York Giants (1917); Chicago Cubs (1917–1919); Brooklyn Robins (1919–1921)

Peter John Kilduff (April 4, 1893 – February 14, 1930) was an American professional baseball player who played second base from 1917 to 1921, with the Giants, Cubs, and Brooklyn Robbins, and as a player / manager in the minors for several years after. Starting 2B for the pennant winning 1920 Brooklyn Robbins, hitting .272/.351/.360 with good defense, good for 3.4 fWAR at the age of 27. He appeared in the 1920 World Series with the Brooklyn Robins where he was one of three outs in Bill Wambsganss's unassisted triple play. Still currently the only unassisted triple play ever in post season play. He was again a solid contributor in 1921 at the age of 28 but was optioned down to the minors for the 1922 season.

Kilduff was one of three players from tiny Weir City, Kansas to come to the majors in the early twentieth century. He played for Oklahoma City from 1914-1916 and for Omaha in 1917. When Buck Herzog was injured, the 1917 New York Giants called Kilduff up to play second base.

He was soon traded to the 1917 Chicago Cubs and the next year was part of their pennant-winning team. However, he was not in the 1918 World Series as he was serving in the Navy at the time. He was again traded to the Brooklyn Robins where he finished his major league career.

Over his ten seasons in the minors, he also played five with the San Francisco Seals (1022-1926) in the Pacific Coast League with 487 RBI's and 57 home runs, and winning the PCL championship in 1922, 1923 and 1925, winning the 1923 Pennant and came within a game and a half of the 1924 pennant. He was a teammate the whole time with Babe Ellison. He also played in the 1925 PCL All-Star team, and as 2B for what was considered the best infield in PCL history from 1922-1925.

He was scheduled to be the manager for the San Francisco Seals when he died of appendicitis just before the 1930 season.

In 428 games over five seasons in the majors, Kilduff posted a .270 batting average (374-for-1384) with 163 runs, 62 doubles, 28 triples, 4 home runs, 160 RBIs, 28 stolen bases, 134 bases on balls, .338 on-base percentage and .364 slugging percentage. He finished his MLB career with a .952 fielding percentage playing at second, third base and shortstop.
