= Jim Bagby Jr. =

American baseball player (1916–1988)

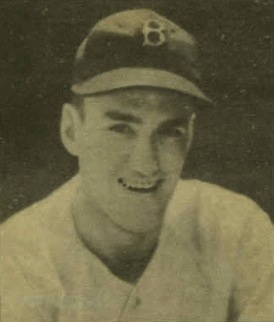
- Bagby in 1940
- Pitcher
- Born: September 8, 1916; Cleveland, Ohio, U.S.
- Died: September 2, 1988 (aged 71); Marietta, Georgia, U.S.
- Batted: Right Threw: Right

MLB debut
- April 18, 1938, for the Boston Red Sox

Last MLB appearance
- September 25, 1947, for the Pittsburgh Pirates

MLB statistics
- Win–loss record: 97–96
- Earned run average: 3.96
- Strikeouts: 431
- Stats at Baseball Reference

Teams
- Boston Red Sox (1938–1940); Cleveland Indians (1941–1945); Boston Red Sox (1946); Pittsburgh Pirates (1947)

Career highlights and awards
- 2× All-Star (1942, 1943)

James Charles Jacob Bagby Jr. (September 8, 1916 – September 2, 1988) was an American starting pitcher in Major League Baseball who played for the Boston Red Sox, Cleveland Indians, and Pittsburgh Pirates. He batted and threw right-handed. His father, Jim Sr., was also a major league pitcher who played with Cincinnati, Cleveland and Pittsburgh between 1912 and 1923.

A native of Cleveland, Ohio, Bagby played with the Red Sox (twice), Indians and Pirates in a span of ten years. He posted a 97–96 record with 431 strikeouts and a 3.96 ERA in 1666 1/3 innings pitched, including 84 complete games and 13 shutouts. He was the Indians pitcher in the July 17, 1941 game that ended Joe DiMaggio's famous 56-game hitting streak.

Bagby reached his career high of 17 wins in each of his All-Star seasons, in 1942 and 1943, and led the American League in starts both years with 35 and 33, respectively. After that, he served much of 1944 in the US Merchant Marine and never again won more than eight games in a regular season.

Bagby was a better-than-average hitting pitcher in the majors, posting a .226 batting average (140-for-620) with 59 runs, 3 home runs and 56 RBI. He was used as a pinch hitter 18 times in his career.

Following his baseball career, Bagby became a professional golf player. In 1992, he was inducted posthumously into the Georgia Sports Hall of Fame.

Bagby died at Keenestone Hospital in Marietta, Georgia on September 2, 1988 after a bout with cancer.

== See also ==
- List of second-generation Major League Baseball players
