= Duster Mails =

American baseball player (1894–1974)

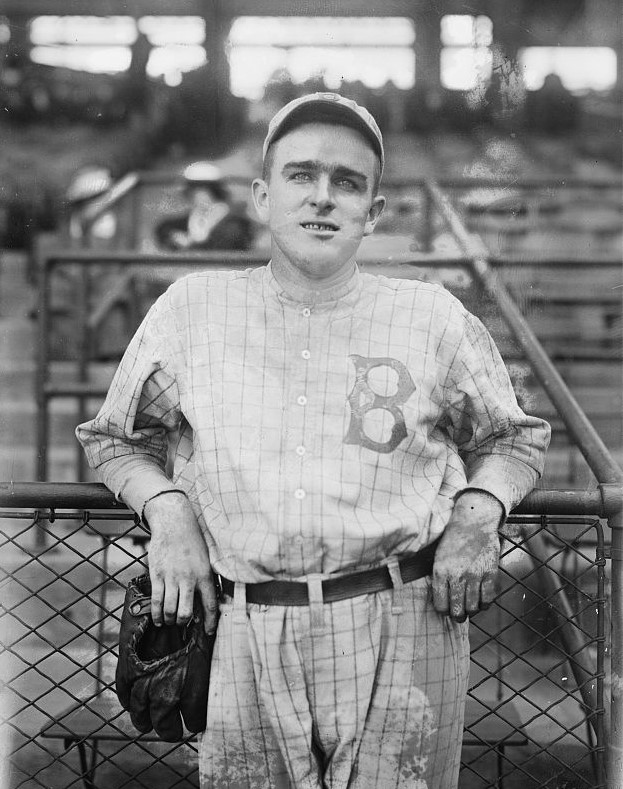
- Mails in 1916
- Pitcher
- Born: October 1, 1894; San Quentin, California, U.S.
- Died: July 5, 1974 (aged 79); San Francisco, California, U.S.
- Batted: Left Threw: Left

MLB debut
- September 28, 1915, for the Brooklyn Robins

Last MLB appearance
- April 29, 1926, for the St. Louis Cardinals

MLB statistics
- Win–loss record: 32–25
- Earned run average: 4.10
- Strikeouts: 232
- Stats at Baseball Reference

Teams
- Brooklyn Robins (1915–1916); Cleveland Indians (1920–1922); St. Louis Cardinals (1925–1926)

Career highlights and awards
- World Series champion (1920)

John Walter "Duster" Mails (October 1, 1894 – July 5, 1974) was an American pitcher in Major League Baseball. He won 32 games while playing for the Brooklyn Robins, Cleveland Indians, and St. Louis Cardinals, and helped the Indians win the 1920 World Series. Mails also won 207 games in the minor leagues, pitching mostly in the Pacific Coast League.

== Early life ==
Mails was born in San Quentin, California, in 1894. He graduated from Christian Brothers High School in Sacramento, California, and attended Saint Mary's College of California. He played baseball for both schools. Mails was a 6'0" tall left-hander.

== Baseball career ==
Mails started his professional baseball career with the Seattle Giants of the Northwestern League in 1914. That season, he pitched 45 innings and had a win–loss record of 2–2. In 1915, he pitched 348 innings and went 24–18. Mails joined the National League's Brooklyn Robins and made his major league debut in September. He pitched two games in relief for the Robins that season, going 0–1. In 1916, Mails pitched 11 games in relief for Brooklyn, going 0–1. The Robins won the pennant, but Mails did not appear in the 1916 World Series, which they lost.

In 1917, Mails joined the Portland Beavers of the Pacific Coast League, pitched 49 innings, and went 3–2. He served in the U.S. military during World War I and did not play professional baseball in 1918.

In 1919, Mails split time between the PCL's Seattle Rainiers and Sacramento Senators. Overall, he pitched 301 innings and went 19–17. In 1920, he pitched 292.2 innings for the Senators, going 18–17 with a 3.23 earned run average. In August, Sacramento traded Mails to the American League's Cleveland Indians. For the rest of the season, he pitched 63.1 innings, going 7–0 with a 1.85 ERA. He helped the Indians win the AL pennant. In Game 3 of the 1920 World Series, Mails pitched 6.2 innings of relief, allowing no runs. In Game 6, he pitched a 1–0 shutout, and the Indians won the series in seven games.

In 1921, Mails pitched 194.1 innings, going 14–8 with a 3.94 ERA. In 1922, he pitched 104 innings, going 4–7 with a 5.28 ERA. That December, the Indians sold him to the PCL's Oakland Oaks.

In 1923, Mails pitched 356 innings, going 23–18 with a 2.96 ERA. In 1924, he pitched 382 innings, going 24–22 with a 3.72 ERA. That December, the Oaks traded him to the NL's St. Louis Cardinals.

In 1925, Mails pitched 131 innings, going 7–7 with a 4.60 ERA. In April 1926, he pitched in one game for the Cardinals and took the loss. That was his final major league appearance. The Cardinals eventually won the 1926 World Series. Mails spent the rest of the season with the International League's Syracuse Stars and the PCL's San Francisco Seals. For the Stars, he pitched 44 innings, going 1–2 with a 4.50 ERA. For the Seals, he pitched 176 innings, going 9–13 with a 4.19 ERA.

Mails played for the Seals from 1927 to 1929. In 1927, he pitched 217 innings, going 11–11 with a 4.40 ERA. In 1928, he pitched 277 innings, going 20–12 with a 3.96 ERA. In 1929, he pitched 250 innings, going 15–16 with a 4.86 ERA.

Mails then returned to the PCL's Portland Beavers. In 1930, he pitched 234 innings, going 11–16 with a 4.38 ERA. In 1931, he pitched 212 innings, going 13–13 with a 5.01 ERA.

In 1932, Mails played for the Southern Association's Chattanooga Lookouts. He pitched 198 innings, going 17–9 with a 4.05 ERA. In 1933, he played for the American Association's Kansas City Blues. He pitched 140 innings, going 9–8 with a 3.79 ERA.

Mails then returned to the PCL's San Francisco Seals. In 1934, he pitched 167 innings, going 4–13 with a 4.15 ERA. In 1935, he pitched 41 innings, going 3–1 with a 4.83 ERA. In 1936, he appeared in eight games before retiring from professional baseball.

In the major leagues, Mails had 516 innings pitched, a 32–25 record, a 4.10 ERA, a 101 ERA+, and 232 strikeouts. In the minor leagues, he had 3,428.2 innings pitched and a 207–193 record.

== Personality ==
Besides his first name "John" and his middle name "Walter", Mails was also known as "Duster" and "The Great". He was nicknamed "Duster" early in his career with Brooklyn because of his wildness while on the mound. Mails called himself "The Great"; he was eccentric and bragged about himself often.

Many stories were told of Mails' exploits. During the last day of the PCL season in September 1935, Mails called his outfielders in before striking out the final batter of the game. That was the last win of his career.

== Later life ==
After his playing career ended, Mails worked in public relations for the PCL's San Francisco Seals and the NL's San Francisco Giants. Mails had been in charge of promotions for the San Francisco Giants' Children Day at Candlestick Park until 1972. Mails was being treated for Parkinson's syndrome when he died at the Fort Miley Veterans Hospital on July 5, 1974. His funeral was held in San Rafael, California.
