= 1920 World Series =

1920 Major League Baseball championship series

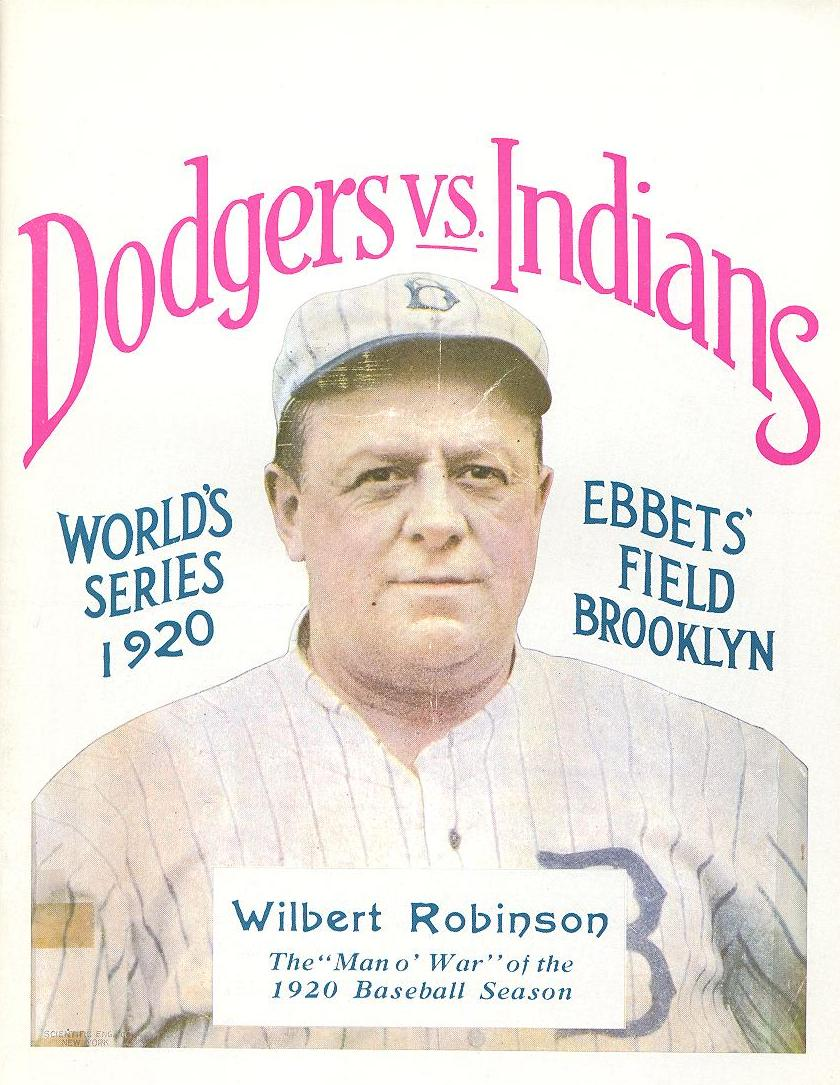
Team (Wins)	Managers	Season
Cleveland Indians (5)	Tris Speaker (player/manager)	98–56, .636, GA: 2
Brooklyn Robins (2)	Wilbert Robinson	93–61, .604, GA: 7
- Dates: October 5–12
- Venue(s): Ebbets Field (Brooklyn); League Park (Cleveland)
- Umpires: Bill Klem (NL), Tommy Connolly (AL), Hank O'Day (NL), Bill Dinneen (AL)
- Hall of Famers: Umpires: Bill Klem; Tommy Connolly; Hank O'Day; Indians: Stan Coveleski; Joe Sewell; Tris Speaker; Robins: Wilbert Robinson (mgr.); Rube Marquard; Zack Wheat; Burleigh Grimes

The 1920 World Series was the championship series for Major League Baseball's 1920 season. The series was a best-of-nine format played between the American League (AL) champion Cleveland Indians and the National League (NL) champion Brooklyn Robins, with the Indians defeating the Robins five games to two to win their first championship in franchise history. This was the first major professional sports championship ever won by a Cleveland-based team. The only World Series triple play, the first World Series grand slam, and the first World Series home run by a pitcher all occurred in Game 5 of this series. This was also the first World Series and first Big Four championship series to feature two brothers on opposing teams, with Doc Johnston playing for Cleveland and Jimmy Johnston playing for Brooklyn.

The Indians won the series in memory of their former shortstop Ray Chapman, who had been killed earlier in the season when struck in the head by a pitched ball.

In Game 5, Cleveland second basemen Bill Wambsganss turned an unassisted triple play. He caught a line drive off the bat of Clarence Mitchell, stepped on second base to put out Pete Kilduff, and tagged Otto Miller coming from first base. It was the second of 15 (as of 2026) unassisted triple plays in major-league baseball history, and it remains the only one—and, indeed, the only triple play of any kind—in postseason play. Mitchell made history again in the eighth inning by hitting into a double play, thereby accounting for five outs in two straight at-bats.

The fifth game also saw the first grand slam in World Series history (hit by Cleveland's Elmer Smith) and the first Series home run hit by a pitcher (Cleveland's Jim Bagby Sr.). And in that same game, Brooklyn outhit Cleveland but lost 8–1.

Cleveland had won the American League pennant in a close race with the Chicago White Sox and the New York Yankees. The Sox's participation in the Black Sox Scandal the previous year had caught up to them late in the season, and their star players were suspended with three games left in the season, when they were in a virtual tie with the Indians. The Yankees, with their recently acquired star Babe Ruth, were almost ready to start their eventual World Series dynasty.

This was the second of three consecutive World Series to use a best-of-nine format, instead of the usual best-of-seven. To reduce travel during the Series, the 2-3-2-2 format that was used in 1919 was changed to 3-4-2. Notably, all seven games of the 1920 World Series were won by the team who scored first. In fact, Game 4 was the only game in which the losing team scored a run before the winning team had scored all of its runs. The lead never changed hands in any game.

This would be the last World Series until 1980 to feature two franchises that had not previously won a championship.

== Summary ==
AL Cleveland Indians (5) vs. NL Brooklyn Robins (2)

Game	Date	Score	Location	Time	Attendance
1	October 5	Cleveland Indians – 3, Brooklyn Robins – 1	Ebbets Field	1:41	23,573
2	October 6	Cleveland Indians – 0, Brooklyn Robins – 3	Ebbets Field	1:55	22,559
3	October 7	Cleveland Indians – 1, Brooklyn Robins – 2	Ebbets Field	1:47	25,088
4	October 9	Brooklyn Robins – 1, Cleveland Indians – 5	League Park	1:54	25,734
5	October 10	Brooklyn Robins – 1, Cleveland Indians – 8	League Park	1:49	26,884
6	October 11	Brooklyn Robins – 0, Cleveland Indians – 1	League Park	1:34	27,194
7	October 12	Brooklyn Robins – 0, Cleveland Indians – 3	League Park	1:55	27,525

== Matchups ==
=== Game 1 ===
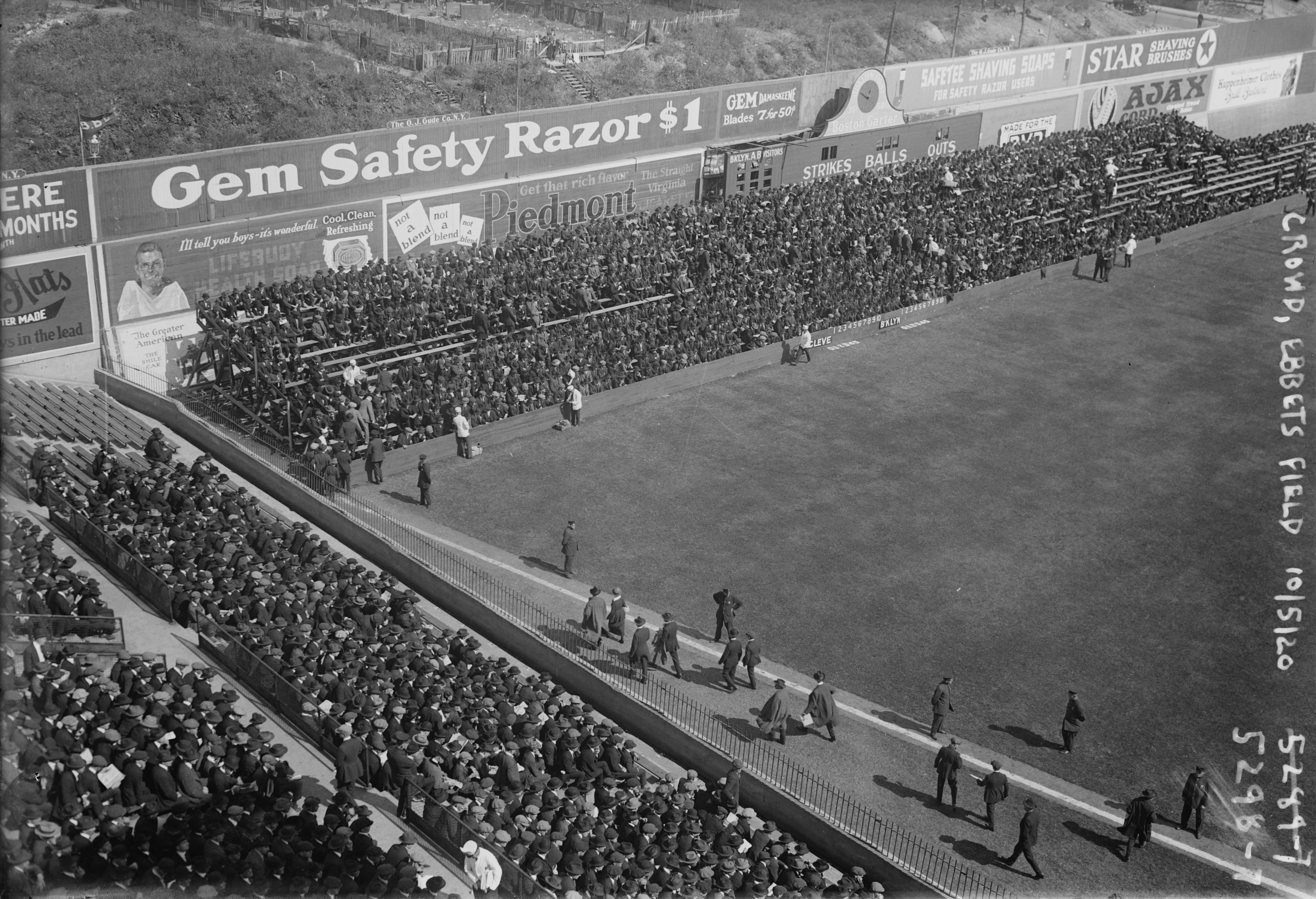
Game 1 at Ebbets Field

Tuesday, October 5, 1920 2:00 pm (ET) at Ebbets Field in Brooklyn, New York
Team	1	2	3	4	5	6	7	8	9	R	H	E
Cleveland	0	2	0	1	0	0	0	0	0	3	5	0
Brooklyn	0	0	0	0	0	0	1	0	0	1	5	1
WP: Stan Coveleski (1–0) LP: Rube Marquard (0–1)

Game 1 took a mere 1 hour, 41 minutes. Steve O'Neill supplied RBI doubles in the second and fourth innings in support of Stan Coveleski, who won it for the visiting Indians with a five-hitter.

=== Game 2 ===
Wednesday, October 6, 1920 2:00 pm (ET) at Ebbets Field in Brooklyn, New York
Team	1	2	3	4	5	6	7	8	9	R	H	E
Cleveland	0	0	0	0	0	0	0	0	0	0	7	1
Brooklyn	1	0	1	0	1	0	0	0	X	3	7	0
WP: Burleigh Grimes (1–0) LP: Jim Bagby (0–1)

A first-inning run on a Jimmy Johnston single and Zack Wheat double would be all Dodger pitcher Burleigh Grimes would require in a complete-game shutout.

=== Game 3 ===
Thursday, October 7, 1920 2:00 pm (ET) at Ebbets Field in Brooklyn, New York
Team	1	2	3	4	5	6	7	8	9	R	H	E
Cleveland	0	0	0	1	0	0	0	0	0	1	3	1
Brooklyn	2	0	0	0	0	0	0	0	X	2	6	1
WP: Sherry Smith (1–0) LP: Ray Caldwell (0–1)

Brooklyn scored twice in the first on hits by Zack Wheat and Hi Myers that chased Cleveland starter Ray Caldwell from the game. The only run winning pitcher Sherry Smith gave up in a three-hitter came when Tris Speaker came all the way around on a double that was misplayed in left field.

=== Game 4 ===
Saturday, October 9, 1920 2:00 pm (ET) at League Park in Cleveland, Ohio
Team	1	2	3	4	5	6	7	8	9	R	H	E
Brooklyn	0	0	0	1	0	0	0	0	0	1	5	1
Cleveland	2	0	2	0	0	1	0	0	X	5	12	2
WP: Stan Coveleski (2–0) LP: Leon Cadore (0–1)

Brooklyn starter Leon Cadore didn't make it past the first inning. His relievers didn't fare much better, Al Mamaux being removed in the third and Rube Marquard greeted by a George Burns two-run double. Stan Coveleski cruised with a five-hitter for his second win of the Series.

=== Game 5 ===
Sunday, October 10, 1920 2:00 pm (ET) at League Park in Cleveland, Ohio
Team	1	2	3	4	5	6	7	8	9	R	H	E
Brooklyn	0	0	0	0	0	0	0	0	1	1	13	1
Cleveland	4	0	0	3	1	0	0	0	X	8	12	2
WP: Jim Bagby (1–1) LP: Burleigh Grimes (1–1); Home runs: BRO: None; CLE: Elmer Smith (1), Jim Bagby (1)

The Cleveland Times ran the following article on Monday, October 11, 1920, recounting Game 5 and Wambsganss' triple play:

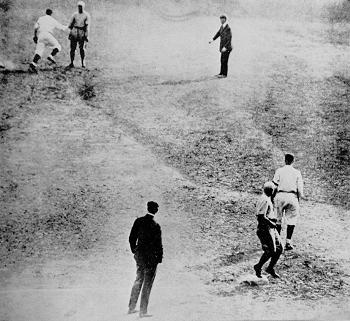
Bill Wambsganss (upper left) completing his unassisted triple play in Game 5, about to tag a stunned Otto Miller after touching second to double up Pete Kilduff (right foreground, touching third).

Wamby Makes Unassisted Triple Play

- CLEVELAND, Sunday Oct 10, 1920 – Bill Wambsganss' unassisted triple play highlighted the most unusual game in World Series history today and helped the Cleveland Indians to a wild 8–1 victory over the Brooklyn Robins. Elmer Smith hit a grand slam and Jim Bagby also homered as the Indians took the lead in games three to two. The triple play and grand slam had never happened before in World Series history and Bagby became the first pitcher to homer in a World Series. "I've been in baseball 40 years", Robins manager Wilbert Robinson said, "and I never saw one like this." The first Indian to face Burleigh Grimes was Charlie Johnson, who singled. He stopped at second on Wambsganss' single. Then Grimes fell fielding Tris Speaker's bunt, loading the bases. Then Smith hit a 1–2 pitch over the right field screen for a 4–0 lead. In the home fourth, Doc Johnston singled to center and moved up on a passed ball. After Grimes put Steve O'Neill on, Bagby homered into the center field stands. Pete Kilduff began the top of the fifth with a single to left center. When Otto Miller singled to center, Speaker's quick throw to third drove Kilduff back to second. That brought up reliever Clarence Mitchell, who went six for sixteen as a pinch-hitter this season and sometimes fills in at first base and in the outfield. A left-handed hitter, he drove the ball toward right center. Second baseman Wambsganss moved slightly to his right, tipped onto his toes, sprung a little bit and grabbed the ball with his gloved hand. Never hesitating, he continued to second base, easily doubling Kilduff. Then when Wamby turned to throw to first base he saw Miller frozen directly in front of him. Reaching out, Wamby tagged Miller easily. The crowd was silent momentarily, then, realizing what had happened, broke into thunderous applause. In the Brooklyn eighth, Ernie Krueger singled to center. But Mitchell grounded to first baseman Johnson, who started a double play. Thus, Mitchell accounted for five outs in two at-bats.

=== Game 6 ===
Monday, October 11, 1920 2:00 pm (ET) at League Park in Cleveland, Ohio
Team	1	2	3	4	5	6	7	8	9	R	H	E
Brooklyn	0	0	0	0	0	0	0	0	0	0	3	0
Cleveland	0	0	0	0	0	1	0	0	X	1	7	3
WP: Duster Mails (1–0) LP: Sherry Smith (1–1)

Even faster than Game 1, this one was done in just 94 minutes. Duster Mails twirled a three-hit shutout, and the lone run came in the sixth on a Tris Speaker two-out single, followed by a George Burns double.

=== Game 7 ===
Tuesday, October 12, 1920 2:00 pm (ET) at League Park in Cleveland, Ohio
Team	1	2	3	4	5	6	7	8	9	R	H	E
Brooklyn	0	0	0	0	0	0	0	0	0	0	5	2
Cleveland	0	0	0	1	1	0	1	0	X	3	7	3
WP: Stan Coveleski (3–0) LP: Burleigh Grimes (1–2)

The Robins didn't score in the last two games. Their pitcher, Burleigh Grimes, committed an error on a Cleveland double steal that resulted in the game's first run. Stan Coveleski needed no more, but got one in the fifth from a Tris Speaker run-scoring triple and another in the seventh on Charlie Jamieson's RBI double. Spitball pitcher Coveleski won for the third time and the Indians celebrated before their home fans.

== Composite line score ==
1920 World Series (5–2): Cleveland Indians (A.L.) over Brooklyn Robins (N.L.)

Team	1	2	3	4	5	6	7	8	9	R	H	E
Cleveland Indians	6	2	2	6	2	2	1	0	0	21	53	12
Brooklyn Robins	3	0	1	1	1	0	1	0	1	8	44	6
Total attendance: 178,557 Average attendance: 25,508; Winning player's share: $4,168 Losing player's share: $2,420

== Aftermath ==
The Indians would have to wait until 1948 to reach the Fall Classic again, where they defeated the Boston Braves in six games for their most recent championship, and currently hold the longest championship drought in the majors.

The Dodgers’ next appearance in the World Series would occur in 1941, which they lost to their cross-town rivals in the New York Yankees in five games, and a first of five straight losses to the Yankees in the World Series. They did not win a Fall Classic until 1955, also against the Yankees.
