= Charlie Jamieson =

American baseball player (1893–1969)

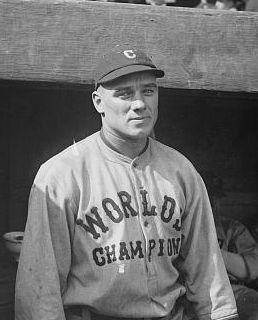
- Left fielder
- Born: February 7, 1893; Paterson, New Jersey, U.S.
- Died: October 27, 1969 (aged 76); Paterson, New Jersey, U.S.
- Batted: Left Threw: Left

MLB debut
- September 20, 1915, for the Washington Senators

Last MLB appearance
- July 17, 1932, for the Cleveland Indians

MLB statistics
- Batting average: .303
- Home runs: 18
- Runs batted in: 552
- Stats at Baseball Reference

Teams
- Washington Senators (1915–1917); Philadelphia Athletics (1917–1918); Cleveland Indians (1919–1932)

Career highlights and awards
- World Series champion (1920); Cleveland Guardians Hall of Fame

Charles Devine "Cuckoo" Jamieson (February 7, 1893 – October 27, 1969) was an American professional baseball player, an outfielder for the Washington Senators (1915–1917), Philadelphia Athletics (1917–1918) and Cleveland Indians (1919–1932).

== Professional career ==
Jamieson helped Cleveland win the 1920 American League pennant, batting .319 with 69 runs scored in 108 games. He went 5 for 15 with two runs scored in the 1920 World Series as the Indians beat the Brooklyn Robins. In 1921 he batted .310 with 94 runs scored, and in 1922 raised his average to .323 while leading the team with 183 hits. 1923 was an even better year for Jamieson, who led the American League with a career-high 222 hits while also setting personal bests in runs (130, 3rd best in the league), on-base percentage (.422), doubles (36), and triples (12) while batting .345. Jamieson hit a career-high .359 in 1924, second in the league behind Babe Ruth, while also finishing second in the league with 213 hits. He scored 98 runs and was 5th in the league with 21 stolen bases, finishing 6th in the MVP balloting. In 1925, his 109 runs scored were the 6th most in the league. Jamieson is the only outfielder who initiated triple plays twice in the same year. On May 23, 1928, his triple play helped the Indians defeat the Chicago White Sox, and he repeated the feat in a 7–3 loss to the New York Yankees on June 9.

He finished his career with a .303 batting average and 1,062 runs scored over 18 major league seasons. Jamieson topped the .300 mark 8 times.

== Life after baseball ==
After retiring from baseball in 1933, Jamieson worked multiple jobs, including working for an aircraft company. He also operated a bowling alley and restaurant. From 1966 to 1969, he had served as a crossing guard. Jamieson suffered a heart attack in September 1969 and suffered heart damage. Jamieson died of a cardiac issue at Paterson General Hospital in Paterson, New Jersey on October 27, 1969, aged 77.

== See also ==
- List of Major League Baseball career runs scored leaders
