= Axelrod =

Axelrod or Akselrod (variant: Axelrad) is an Ashkenazi Jewish surname. Notable people with the surname include:

- Albert Axelrod (1921–2004), American Olympic medalist foil fencer
- Ari Axelrod, American singer and actor
- Barry Axelrod (1946–2024), American sports agent
- Beth Axelrod, American executive
- Daniel I. Axelrod (1910–1998), American paleoecologist, botanist, and geologist, known by author abbreviation "Axelrod"
- David Axelrod (born 1955), American political consultant who worked on campaigns of Barack Obama and Richard M. Daley
- David Axelrod (musician) (1936–2017), American classical musician
- Donald Axelrod (1916–1999), American academic
- Dylan Axelrod (born 1985), American MLB baseball player
- Gan-ya Ben-gur Akselrod (born 1987), American-Israeli soprano
- George Axelrod (1922–2003), American screenwriter, producer, playwright, and film director
- Herbert R. Axelrod (1927–2017), American author, publisher, and ichthyologist
- Jason David Axelrod AKA David Ha'ivri (born 1967), Jewish-Israeli settler activist and spokesman
- Jim Axelrod (born 1963), American reporter for CBS
- John Axelrod (born 1966), American conductor
- Julius Axelrod (1912–2004), American biochemist who won a share of the Nobel Prize in Physiology or Medicine in 1970
- Lyubov Axelrod (1868–1946), Russian Marxist philosopher and revolutionary
- Max M. Axelrod (1911–2004), American philanthropist and activist
- Meer Akselrod (1902–1970), Russian painter known for paintings of Jewish life in the Russian Empire and the Soviet Union
- Nathan Axelrod (1905–1987), Belarusian Israeli filmmaker
- Paul Axelrod (born 1949), British author and professor and dean at York University
- Pavel Axelrod (1850–1928), Russian Menshevik revolutionary
- Robert Axelrod (political scientist) (born 1943), American professor of political science at the University of Michigan who has written about the evolution of cooperation
- Robert Axelrod (actor) (1949–2019), American actor who has been in movies and TV shows, often as a voice actor
- Victor Axelrod, American independent music producer and artist
