= Axelrad =

Axelrad is a Yiddish surname, a variant of Axelrod. Notable people with the surname include:

- Albert S. Axelrad (born 1938), American rabbi
- Édouard Axelrad (1918–2006), French writer
- John Axelrad, editor of films including We Own the Night
- Nancy Axelrad, publisher and author of some of the Nancy Drew series of books
- Penina Axelrad, American aerospace engineer
- Vicki Lawrence (b. 1949), born Vicki Ann Axelrad, American actress, comedian, and singer
- Abraham of Cologne (fl. c. 1240), German rabbi
