= Zoroastrian population decline =

The phenomenon of the Zoroastrian population decline has garnered considerable attention and discussion within academia, literature, and journalism.

A number of studies, conducted by both Indian and Western academics, have offered comprehensive insights into the complex dynamics underlying this demographic shift. Despite some segments of the community hesitating to acknowledge this decline, rigorous examination of census data and demographic studies spanning several decades sheds light on various factors contributing to this trend.

== History ==
The Sasanian Empire, which was the last Zoroastrian state in Iran, finally succumbed to Arab conquest by 642 CE. Subsequently, a significant migration of Zoroastrians to India occurred, likely in the 8th or 9th century, leading to the establishment of the Parsi community. Scholars, including Jamsheed Choksy, have hypothesized that the transition from Zoroastrianism to Islam among Iranians following the Arab invasion was a gradual process spanning several centuries, as evidenced by Islamic biographical dictionaries.

Furthermore, Bulliet's statistical analysis indicates that a mere 8% of urban Iranians were Muslim a century after the Abbasids’ rise to power in 750 CE, with this figure increasing to approximately 80% by the 10th century, although rural areas retained stronger Zoroastrian adherence.

=== Iran ===
The Zoroastrian population continued to decline due to conversions, persecution, and massacres, dwindling to a few thousand by the 19th century. Maneckji Limji Hataria's survey in the 1850s found fewer than 7,000 Zoroastrians in Iran. However, the efforts of Hataria and the 'Society for the Amelioration of the Conditions of the Zoroastrians in Persia' led to improved conditions in the 20th century. This resulted in a population rebound, with the 1966 census reporting around 20,000 Zoroastrians, over 9,000 of whom resided in Tehran.

Estimates prior to the Islamic Revolution in 1979, ranged between 20,000 and 30,000 Zoroastrians. Post-revolution, the 1981 census reported over 92,000 Zoroastrians, likely inflated due to Baha’is registering as Zoroastrians amidst the Islamic Republic's non-recognition of Baha’ism. Subsequent censuses have not recorded religious affiliation, necessitating reliance on estimates for current figures. Mobed Firouzgary's 2004 demographic report for the FEZANA Journal estimated the Zoroastrian population at 24,000, aligning with electoral data. However, migration, particularly of younger individuals, to Western countries due to economic challenges has led to a significant decrease in the Zoroastrian population, leaving an aging community behind. Current estimates suggest no more than 12,000 to 15,000 Zoroastrians remain in Iran, reflecting a serious demographic situation for the religion historically intertwined with the nation.

=== India ===
The majority of Zoroastrians in the world are Parsis, the descendants of refugees who migrated to the Indian subcontinent, fleeing religious persecution after the Islamic invasion and destruction of the Sassanian Empire. It is thought, they were economically prosperous in the centuries subsequent to their migration. However, this period was marred by the invasion of Gujarat by Alauddin Khilji, leading to various conflicts, riots, and massacres endured by both Parsis and Hindus against the invaders. Parsis were a predominantly agricultural community by 1650.

Under British rule, Parsis, along with Bhatias, Hindu Banias, Jains, Baghdadi Jews, Bohra, and Khoja Muslims, actively participated in mercantile endeavors, especially in the city of Bombay. Notably, Parsis provided significant support and financial backing to the nascent Indian Independence movement, with leaders such as Dadabhai Naroji, Bhikaji Cama, Phereozeshah Mehta, Khurshed F. Nariman, Ardeshir Godrej and Mithuben Petit. Post-independence, Parsis are known for their patriotism and they have played a leading role in the development of India as a republic, this includes India's first field marshall Sam Manekshaw and architect of India's nuclear program Homi Bhabha. Parsis have been described by various Indian politicians, including Narendra Modi as 'The World's Best Minority'.

Key studies addressing Parsi population decline include Paul Axelrod's seminal works, such as "Cultural and Historical Factors in the Population Decline of the Parsis of India" (1990) and "Natality and Family Planning in Three Bombay Communities" (1988), along with other significant contributions like Jayant Kumar Banthia's "Parsi Demography: Past, Recent, and Future" (2003) and Chidambara Chandrasekaran's pioneering research on Parsi demography dating back to 1948. These studies collectively underscore a unanimous observation: the precipitous drop in Parsi fertility rates stands as a central driver of the population decline. Every demographic study conducted on the Indian Parsis, who constitute the largest component of the worldwide Zoroastrian community, indicates a steep and steady decline in population due to low fertility rates.

Contrary to biological conjectures, scholarly consensus suggests that low Parsi fertility primarily stems from socio-cultural factors rather than genetic predispositions. Early demographic investigations, such as Chandrasekaran's study, discredited biological explanations, emphasizing instead the influence of social norms and cultural attitudes on fertility rates. Axelrod's subsequent research further corroborated this assertion, in his 1990 publication in the scholarly journal Population Studies, he analyzed statistical findings and determined that “It would appear that Parsi women are not sub-fecund [i.e., more biologically infertile] and, once married, are able to bear children quickly and without difficulty.” When fertility becomes a biological concern within the Parsi community, it often arises from the practice of marrying and attempting to conceive children at an advanced age.

The decline in fertility rates among the Parsis is considered one of the most dramatic outside of Europe, leading to an unprecedented fall in population numbers. The impact of late marriage and non-marriage on the Parsi population is evident in the fertility rates, which are well below the replacement level necessary to sustain the population. In 1881, the birthrate for Parsis in Bombay was 34 per 1000 population, which dropped to 25 per 1000 population by 1926 and further slid to 12 per 1000 population by the 1960s. By 1961, due to late marriage or non-marriage, the births to Parsi women in Greater Bombay were only 50 percent of the number that would have occurred if every woman were married throughout her reproductive period.

The situation worsened in the following decades. By 1980–82, the total fertility rate (TFR) for Parsis was already 1.12, about half of the replacement level, and it further declined to 0.94 in 2000. Recent data from 2001 to 2006 observed a TFR of 0.88, a figure that is significantly lower than the TFRs of total populations in countries like South Korea and Japan, which are known to have serious demographic decline.

The low fertility rate has resulted in an aging Parsi population and a dramatic shift in the age distribution. Despite the decline in fertility rates since the 1880s, the Parsi population in India continued to grow until the 1950s due to lower mortality rates and longer life expectancy. However, as the number of elderly Parsis increased, new generations of Parsi children became smaller. By 2001, one in every eight Parsis was a child under the age of 15, whereas one in every four Parsis was aged 65 and above.

As these trends continue, the Parsi community in India will see a significant decline in population numbers in the coming decades. Projections suggest that by 2051, only 32,000 Parsis will remain in India, less than half of the current population. Similarly another prediction is that, the Parsi population of Bombay, which was 46,557 in 2001, is projected to decline to 20,122. Dinshaw Tamboly, the Chairman of The WZO Trust Funds has reckoned by the end of the 21st century there will only be 9,995 Parsis left in India.

== Contributing factors ==
=== Late Marriage ===
Late marriage emerges as a salient feature within the Parsi community, with historical records tracing its evolution. While the Parsis, such as Behramji Malbari were pioneers in abandoning the practice of child marriage in the late 19th century, subsequent decades witnessed a progressive delay in the age of marriage. By 1930, the median age of marriage for Parsi women surpassed 24 years, significantly higher than national averages. Current data indicates even higher marriage ages, with the median age standing at 27 for women and 31 for men among Indian Parsis, substantially exceeding the thresholds conducive to population replacement.

The trend of late marriages among Parsis has led to a significant increase in the number of individuals who have never married. This phenomenon, as stated by Axelrod, is often a direct result of late marriages, particularly in the case of the Parsis.

=== Non-marriage ===
It has been noted that delaying marriage often increases the likelihood of remaining unmarried. The rates of non-marriage within the Parsi population are striking, attracting the attention of numerous demographers. In 1948, Sapur Faredun Desai, author of “A Community at the Cross-Road”, expressed concern over the increasing rates of unmarried Parsis, which had risen by 40 percent between 1881 and 1931. Chandrasekaran's research shows that by 1931, 16 percent of Parsi women remained unmarried at the end of their reproductive cycle, a significant increase from 6 percent in 1901. This trend was not confined to urban areas like Bombay. Studies conducted in rural Gujarat found that between 13 percent and 55 percent of surveyed women remained unmarried well into middle age. In the 1960s, it was found that the percentage of married Parsis in Karachi was “unusually low” compared to Muslim women of the same age group.

Non-marriage of Zoroastrians is prevalent across all educational levels, indicating that it was not linked to any particular socioeconomic class. Current figures suggest that the proportion of single people in the Parsi community might be one of the highest in the world. In 1982, a study commissioned by the Bombay Parsi Punchayet (BPP), found that 45 percent of all adult males and 38 percent of all adult females surveyed were never married.

A similar study conducted by the Tata Institute of Social Sciences (TISS) in 1999 found that 40 percent of men and 30 percent of Parsis in Greater Mumbai remained unmarried throughout their lives. According to a paper presented by Sayeed Unisa and others in 2009, one out of every five Parsi Indian males, and one out of every ten females, is still unmarried by the age of 50.

=== Out-migration ===
Due to the sheer magnitude of the departure, out-migration now seems to be significantly contributing to Iran's Zoroastrian population decline. This is the same for Pakistan and since the 1960s, out-migration has been observed as a significant cause in the decline of the relatively tiny community, centered in Karachi which was in the erstwhile Bombay presidency. As of 2009 it has been documented 95% of Pakistani Zoroastrian youth are making the decision to leave their homeland. Zoroastrians who stay in Karachi are noted to face economic discrimination based on their religious identity.

While some academics, acknowledge that migration may have a role in India, they also point out that it is very challenging to quantify and evaluate and it doesn't seem to be all that relevant. Undoubtedly, at least 95% of young people in India are choosing to remain on the country's soil. Unisa, et al. made the decision to search statistics on Parsi age distribution for telltale indicators of significant out-migration in light of the tone of the discussion in India. Between 1961 and 2001, they discovered "no significant distortions in the age pattern"—that is, there were no anomalous declines in the population of young adult age cohorts.

Consequently, they came to the conclusion that, while an accurate evaluation is impossible, "migration does not appear to be a reason for the decline in Parsi population in the recent past." Based on the data previously provided in this research, it is also highly probable that out-migration is not enough to explain the demographic reduction in India, given the sharp decline in Zoroastrian populations globally. Thus, out-migration contributes to the fall in the Indian Parsi population, but not significantly.

=== Intermarriage ===
In recent decades, few many neighbourhood concerns have generated as much debate as this one. India has undoubtedly seen a rise in the number of interfaith marriages. When Sapur Faredun Desai wrote his book in 1948, intermarriage was hardly recorded. However, by 1991, it accounted for 19% of all Parsi weddings in Bombay, and by 2005, 31%. The numbers seem to be greater for other parts of India. Our demographers acknowledge once more how difficult it is to pinpoint the exact effects of intermarriage. However, academics like Axelrod are certain that although statistics on out-migration and intermarriage might be "substantial" on their own, they "are not sufficient to account entirely for the population decline."

Dr. Zubin Shroff attempted to quantify the proportionate influence of intermarriage on the future population of the Bombay community in his 2010 paper. He found that, regardless of whether offspring from any mixed marriages are accepted, "the Parsi population will decline sharply over the next few decades, given current fertility trends." The birth rate within the community is so low that the inclusion of children from intermarried couples scarcely impacts the situation.

Given current fertility and intermarriage rates, Bombay's population in 2051 will be 19,136 if no children of any intermarried pair are accepted, 20,122 if only children of intermarried women are disqualified, and 20,535 if all intermarriage children are accepted.

Shroff concludes that both liberals and conservatives have overstated the role of intermarriage in the community's population decline, while the community's "abysmally low fertility" has actually "brought the community to the so-called demographic brink." If rates of intermarriage keep rising and the long-term offspring of these marriages—children and grandkids, for instance—are not brought up as Zoroastrians, intermarriage may very well be a reason for worry to the community, including the population in diaspora within North America.

=== Childless couples ===
A significant proportion of Parsi couples have no children, with a 1999 study by the Tata Institute of Social Sciences (TISS) revealing that 12 percent of married Parsi women are childless. This high rate of childlessness is attributed to both biological fertility issues and deliberate avoidance of pregnancies.

The Parsi community, considering itself enlightened, has shown less prejudice and more acceptance towards openly gay members compared to other Indian communities. This acceptance may contribute to a higher visibility of gay Parsis compared to other Indian communities where discrimination and social stigma persist. There is no scientific evidence to support a claim of a high rate of homosexuality within the Parsi community, particularly among men.

The issue of religious conversion also plays a role in the Parsi community's demographic trends. Contrary to the myth of widespread conversion to Zoroastrianism in regions such as Central Asia and Russia, the reality is that conversion remains a rare occurrence. In Iran, conversion is punishable under the Islamic Republic, and there is no significant evidence of Muslim Iranians in the diaspora converting to Zoroastrianism.

=== Conversion ===
Throughout history, there have been notable instances of individuals from the Zoroastrian faith adopting other larger religions. A significant number of Zoroastrians in Iran, for example, embraced Baha’ism in the late 19th century. The initial documented instance of conversion occurred during the 1880s and involved a Yazd merchant by the name of KayKhosro Khodadad. Amighi points out the absence of precise statistics regarding Zoroastrian conversions but suggests that the figure was likely substantial. According to Amighi's findings, in Yazd, about 30 percent of the Zoroastrian families had a minimum of one Baha’i member within their broader family network.

Additionally, Zoroastrians in Iran have been persistently coerced to convert to Islam. In Iran, there have been reports of government-sponsored or sanctioned efforts to convert religious minorities, including Zoroastrians, to Islam. These initiatives may involve financial incentives or other forms of persuasion aimed at encouraging conversion. The Iranian educational system predominantly follows Islamic teachings and practices, which can create an environment where non-Muslim students, including Zoroastrians, feel pressure to conform to Islamic norms. Consequently, Zoroastrians may face employment or advancement barriers in certain fields if they openly practice their faith. Employers may prefer candidates who align more closely with the dominant Islamic culture, leading Zoroastrians to downplay or conceal their religious identity to avoid discrimination.

The Parsis faced significant pressure to convert from colonial powers in India. Following the Portuguese consolidation of their occupation of Thana around 1560, they implemented violently intolerant practices towards other religions, similar to those of the preceding Muslim conquerors. The Portuguese authorities issued an ultimatum to the Zoroastrians of Thana: convert to Christianity or face execution. According to tradition, the Zoroastrians requested a delay and deceived the Portuguese by claiming they would convert as a group on the following Sunday. The Portuguese agreed, allowing the Zoroastrians to use the respite to abandon Thana and resettle in Kalyan. Subsequently, the Portuguese destroyed all Zoroastrian places of worship, repurposing their stones to construct churches and other colonial buildings.

In the 1830s, the Parsi community experienced a notable increase in conversions to Christianity, initiated by the orientalist and missionary John Wilson. This trend persisted well into the 20th century. Prominent individuals who converted during this period included Sir Ness Wadia (father of Neville Wadia) and Nadir Dinshaw. Another significant conversion was that of Rattanbai Jinnah to Islam. These interactions with colonial powers, marked by forced conversions and religious persecution, significantly influenced the Zoroastrian community, shaping its demographic and cultural landscape over the centuries.

While there are no accurate statistics on the number of individuals formally leaving the religion, anecdotal evidence suggests that the number is extremely limited. However, a more significant concern may be the number of individuals who, due to apathy or irreligiosity, do not pass on Zoroastrianism to their children. This trend could have long-term implications for the community's religious continuity.

== Potential solutions ==
The decline in Parsi fertility rates has been a known issue among scholars for over six decades, with numerous studies confirming a drastic population slide.

Many potential solutions have been documented and proposed by Zoroastrian organizations, which can be broadly categorized into organizational actions and individual initiatives.

=== Organizational actions ===
Community resources and organizations must be harnessed to arrest the population decline. This primarily involves adults in the community, particularly those in positions of leadership. Some community leaders have already undertaken commendable work to encourage marriage and childbirth and to make housing more accessible to young couples in Bombay. However, more needs to be done, and the rest of the community needs to participate. Community organizations play a crucial role in prioritizing youth issues and promoting marriage and childbearing. In India, the Bombay Parsi Panchayat (BPP) has initiated successful programs such as the Zoroastrian Youth for the Next Generation (ZYNG). Similarly, the Federation of Zoroastrian Associations of North America (FEZANA) has supported youth efforts through organizations like the Zoroastrian Youth of North America (ZYNA).

The Jiyo Parsi Scheme is a unique initiative launched by the Ministry of Minority Affairs in 2013 to address the declining population of the Parsi community in India. The scheme aims to reverse this trend by adopting a scientific protocol and structured interventions. It comprises three components: an Advocacy Component that includes workshops and advertisement campaigns to create awareness, a Health of the Community Component which covers childcare, creche support, and assistance to the elderly, and a Medical Component that provides financial assistance for the detection and treatment of infertility, fertility treatment. The scheme offers cash assistance to encourage Parsi couples to have children, regardless of their financial status.

=== Promoting youth interaction ===
Promoting interaction among the youth of the community is a key strategy. Unlike in India, Iran, or Pakistan, Zoroastrians in the diaspora are not concentrated in specific cities or neighborhoods, making regular interaction a challenge. Local Zoroastrian associations can support and fund activities for youth and young adults, organize regional youth meetings, and facilitate participation in congresses and events.

=== Creating Infrastructure to Promote Marriage ===
Addressing the issue of finding suitable matches within the community is another important aspect. The creation of a comprehensive, user-friendly, and regularly updated Zoroastrian matrimonial website could be a potential solution. Such a portal could promote cooperation among different Zoroastrian associations worldwide.

=== Individual responsibility ===
The youth of the community have a significant role to play. The drastic decline in Parsi fertility is not due to biological reasons but cultural and attitudinal ones. If falling numbers are due to cultural norms and attitudes toward marriage and family, then attitudes can change. The process of decline can be stopped and eventually reversed if fertility rates increase. This is achievable, as shown in studies by Zubin Shroff and Sayeeda Unisa, et al., though it will require a substantial increase in current fertility rates.

Here are some steps individuals can take, which have been suggested by Dr. Dinyar Patel:

1. Get married: Marriage is an important institution in any community. A significant proportion of potential fertility is lost if a substantial percentage of women never marry.
2. Do not delay marriage until a late age: It becomes increasingly difficult and risky to have children the longer one waits. If one wants to have a family, it is best to start looking for a potential partner at a relatively earlier age.
3. Try to find a Zoroastrian spouse: A union between two Zoroastrians is most likely to result in offspring who are raised as Zoroastrian and in the community's culture and traditions.
4. Have children: A total fertility rate (TFR) of 2.1 is necessary for the replacement of a population. The current TFR for Parsis is below 1.0, so the Parsis are well below the replacement level. Couples should be encouraged to have at least two children
5. Raise children as Zoroastrians: Individuals should strive to pass on their religion, tradition, and culture to a new generation.

== Defining Zoroastrian Identity ==
The definition of who is considered a Parsi or a Zoroastrian has been a subject of debate. In 1908, Justice Dinshaw Davar made a significant decision in what is known as the Parsi Punchayet Case (Petit v Jijibhai). This judicial case indirectly dealt with the admission of non-Zoroastrian spouses, including the French wife of R.D. Tata, into the Parsi community. Rather than relying on religious texts or precedent, Justice Davar defined Parsis as a patriarchal community. The question of defining who was a Zoroastrian and a Parsi arose again in the 1915-18 Rangoon Navjote case, which involved Bella, a child of a Parsi mother and a Goan Christian father. Initially, the Burma court sided with Bella's supporters, affirming her status as a Zoroastrian. However, after a series of appeals, the Privy Court ultimately accepted Justice Davar's definition.

== See also ==
- Persecution of Zoroastrians
- Parsis
- Iranis (India)
