= Bagwell =

Bagwell may refer to:

== People named Bagwell ==
- Buff Bagwell (b. 1970), a ring name of American professional wrestler and actor Marcus Alexander Bagwell
- Jeff Bagwell (b. 1968), US baseball player
- John Philip Bagwell (1874–1946), Irish politician and railroad manager
- Philip Bagwell (1914–2006), British historian and academic
- Richard Bagwell (1848–1918), Irish historian and academic
- Shaune Bagwell (b. 1974), US model and film actress
- Wendy Bagwell (1925–1996), US Southern gospel singer
- William Bagwell (politician) (1776–1826), Irish political figure

== Places ==
- Bagwell, Texas, an unincorporated community in the Red River County of US state of Texas
- Bagwell Field, the football facility of East Carolina University in the US state of North Carolina

== Other ==
- United Mine Workers of America v. Bagwell, United States Supreme Court case
- Theodore "T-Bag" Bagwell, a fictional character on US television series Prison Break
- Bagwell College of Education, the Educational College of Kennesaw State University in US state of Georgia
