= John Bagwell =

John Bagwell may refer to:

- John Bagwell (1715–1784), Irish MP for Tulsk 1761–68
- John Bagwell (died 1816) (1751–1816), MP for Tipperary
- John Bagwell (Liberal politician) (1811–1883), Liberal politician, MP for Clonmel, Lord of the Treasury
- John Philip Bagwell (1874–1946), Irish railway executive and politician, grandson of the above

== See also ==
- Bagwell (surname)
