= War for talent =

Human resources concept

The war for talent is a term coined by Steven Hankin of McKinsey & Company in 1997, and a book by Ed Michaels, Helen Handfield-Jones, and Beth Axelrod, Harvard Business Press, 2001 ISBN 978-1-57851-459-5. The war for talent refers to an increasingly competitive landscape for recruiting and retaining talented employees. In the book, Michaels, et al., describe not a set of superior Human Resources processes, but a mindset that emphasizes the importance of talent to the success of organizations.

== Demographic ==
The war for talent is intensified by demographic shifts (primarily in the United States and Europe). This is characterized by increasing demand along with decreasing supply (demographically). There are simply fewer post-baby-boom workers to replace the baby-boom retirement in the US and Europe (though this is not the case in most of East Asia, Southeast Asia, Central Asia, Central America, South America, or the Middle East; Eastern Europe also tends to have similar demographics, namely an aging and/or shrinking labor force).

== Knowledge work ==
While talent is vague or ill-defined, the underlying assumption is that for knowledge-intensive industries, the knowledge worker (a term coined by Peter Drucker) is the key competitive resource (see the Resource-based view of the firm). Knowledge-based theories of organizations consistently place knowledge workers as a primary, competitive resource.

== Definition of talent ==
Talent is never explicitly defined in the book, though the Preface notes, "A certain part of talent elude description: You simply know it when you see it." (p. xii) After several further caveats, the authors go on: "We can say, however, that managerial talent is some combination of a sharp strategic mind, leadership ability, emotional maturity, communications skills, the ability to attract and inspire other talented people, entrepreneurial instincts, functional skills, and the ability to deliver results." (p. xiii) The authors offer no outside support for this assertion.

A 2006 article in The Economist, which mentions the book, notes that, "companies do not even know how to define “talent”, let alone how to manage it. Some use it to mean people like Aldous Huxley's alphas in “Brave New World”—those at the top of the bell curve. Others employ it as a synonym for the entire workforce, a definition so broad as to be meaningless."

== Talent management and retention of top talent ==
Talent management has various definitions but common elements include that it is a strategy that enhances the advancement of talented employees, a tool that aides career progression, and the implementation of processes and procedures to support recruitment, development, and retention. Talent management is positively associated with employee retention.

Talent retention is the ability of an organisation to retain its high performing staff and is a key component of most talent management strategies and frameworks.

Retention is key to winning the war for talent. The struggle to retain top performers is one of the four major characteristics of the talent war (the others are: competition to hire top talent from other companies, participation of big and small organisations on an increasingly levelled playing field, and unexpected and unanticipated effects). Retention has been identified as a key issue in several studies. Top performers are more likely to leave than average performing employees, across all levels of an organisation.

Not retaining top performing staff is costly. Financial costs associated with recruiting and training new employees range for 1.5 to 2.5 times an employees’ annual salary. There are also social costs like remaining employees having to pick up the workload where there is a vacancy, reducing efficiency and effectiveness decreasing productivity and having a negative impact on morale. The turnover costs may be higher when the most talented employees leave.

The war for talent can take organisations by surprise, as top management focuses on attrition rate of high-ranking employees, not necessarily the highest performing employees. It can be difficult for large companies to monitor the retention of middle-management as they are often highly decentralised, so they may not be aware of the talent war.

=== Talent management strategies to retain top performers ===
Human resource departments have traditionally focused on the retention of all employees, but in light of the talent war it is necessary to identify and implement policies to retain top talent. Top performers are responsible for a large portion of productivity. Better talent management can aid in the identification and retention of top performers. This can include:

- Clear advancement opportunities - high performers are more likely to cite advancement opportunities as a reason for why they will stay with their company.
- Financial rewards - financial compensation is not useful as a sole strategy to attract and retain talented employees. For high performers, salary is important, but also the opportunity for rewards based on performance - top performers are more likely to stay with companies that have contingent rewards. It is critical to recognise employee contributions and reward effort accordingly.
- Alignment with organisational objectives - when employees feel their objectives and skills are not aligned with their organisation, they are more likely to move on, and top performers with more talent and skills are more likely to move on to other jobs.
- Job sculpting - Top performers want challenging and interesting work, so it is crucial that is provided, in order to retain them. They are also more likely to want to stay if they feel they are making a difference. Job sculpting, matching the job to the person's values and interests, can help with this.
- Development plans - individualised development plans improve retention of top performers, as top performers seek learning and development opportunities.
- Training - training is an investment in an employee, but to benefit from the costs of this the organisation must retain the employee. Research found that training increases employee retention by 14% across all training measures studied, and 18% for credible training (from external institutions). There is a flip side - the same research found that retention is reduced by up to 2.5% in general when training is visible and portable, and by 4% when credible. However, the overall effect is still positive.
- Leadership behaviours - research has found that six leadership behaviours are predictors of talent retention: acknowledgement of employee background and experience; understanding employee motivations; respecting employees; taking responsibility; treating employees as individuals; and providing stimulation to maintain employee’s interest at work. Leaders who demonstrate empowering behaviours have a positive influence on retention.

Talent management practices used alongside employee engagement initiatives leads to improved talent retention.

== Global relevance 2023 ==
A talent war happens when there is a limited supply of workers with in-demand skills so employers have to battle it out to gain access to the most highly sought-after employees. The international context shows that the demand for talent is global in nature and this competition will increase in the future with ageing populations across the developed world

Current estimates predict that the global talent shortage could reach 85 million people by 2030. In today's tech-based global economy, where digital transformation is reshaping industries and job markets, companies that have access to the best talent could have a significant advantage over those that do not. Talented employees are not only more productive and innovative, but they also bring fresh perspectives and diverse experiences that can help businesses stay competitive and adapt to changing market conditions

Labour markets have tightened in many countries since the onset of the pandemic, especially in the Anglophone countries, where vacancy-to-unemployed ratios have been trending upwards. For example, in the United States, labour markets were already tight before the pandemic and have become even tighter since then: there were 1.2 vacancies per unemployed in 2019 Q4, and 1.5 two years later. Record employment levels in countries are putting upward pressure on wages and salaries, as labour demand rises relative to supply

=== Impact of COVID 19 on the talent war ===
The COVID-19 crisis may have triggered a change in workers’ preferences. Workers, including those that have been on the front line during the pandemic, are no longer accepting low-quality jobs that are characterised by low-pay, and poor working conditions e.g. shift hours, health risks and strenuous tasks, as well as poor social benefits. Retail trade, food and hospitality, as well as manufacturing exhibit the highest rises in attrition. As the labour market tightens post pandemic workers quitting their employer may not necessarily switch industry or occupations; rather, as vacancies are on the rise, they may be offered better pay and working conditions for the same activity by another employer

=== Strategy considerations ===
One of the most critical issues is finding the right people, something many organisations appear to be struggling with. A 2016 digital business study found that the ability for ministries to attract and retain talent was one of the most serious, and most overlooked, digital threats governments faced.

There are four main streams of research on Talent Management which both the public and private sector can consider when they are developing a way to win the war for talent

First, Talent Management is viewed as a rebranded human resource practice that highlights the importance of external hiring from the labour market. This talks to grounding talent management in a strategic decision framework that clearly defines talent, guides talent decisions, and develops systems-level models that illustrate talent choices. Bringing talent in externally is seen as a competitive advantage by having fresh perspectives, market knowledge and insights, and bringing in new networks

The second stream shifts the emphasis toward internal development of talent which involves cultivating particular roles and skills, and human resources (HR) practices such as succession planning. This is a very common practise in militaries around the world, where personnel are brought in with the intent to grow and develop them over many years through specific training and promotion requirements, and clearly defined pathways with multiple job options within the same organisation

The third views Talent Management as the generic management of talents to fill talent gaps by focusing on top/star performers

And the fourth stream focuses on key positions that can impact outcomes and actively adopts workforce differentiation by dividing jobs into two categories: those that are strategic and those that are nonstrategic.

While options and priorities will vary depending on country-specific context, a number of these options can be considered to make jobs more attractive to talented workers where labour shortages are most acute and workplaces are trying to attract and retain the best talent.

== Public Sector organisational culture ==
Organisational culture plays an important role in the war for talent in both attracting new talent and retaining existing talent in the Public Sector. In recent years, public services agencies, health, and the educational sector have been struggling to fill their roles. People no longer consider monetary compensation as the key driver for joining an organisation, they are increasingly looking for a positive and supportive organisational culture that aligns with their values, empowers them to innovate, and provides a good work-life balance.

Organisational culture is often defined as a set of shared assumptions in the organisation that guides behaviors, thinking, and even feelings (Ravasi and Schultz, 2006). It is the set of values, beliefs, attitudes, systems, and rules that outline and influence employee behaviour within an organization (Wong, 2023). Public sector organisational culture is also reflected in people’s willingness to collaborate within the agencies, the quality and the effectiveness of services provided to the public, and the engagement with other government agencies and their international counterparts.

Culture cannot be created through organisational policies or statements. It is built by the consistent and authentic behaviours of its leaders and employees in value alignment, communication, and workplace practices. When the culture is aligned with the people working in the organisation, they will feel supported, valued, and empowered. They are likely to stay longer in the organisation, motivated to perform in their roles, and promote the organisation to other people. There are important practices that builds a great culture in the organisation in the public sector:

=== Value alignment ===
According to this concept, the organisation must be able to articulate clearly why it exists and the value they contribute to the public. When the organisational value, goals and objectives are clearly aligned with the employees, people are motivated to put in greater effort into job performance because they feel the sense of purpose and belonging. If people know “the why”, they can work out “the how”. It is particularly important when it comes to crisis and dealing with unexpected work demand, such as the pandemic. Agencies with great cultures often put in the effort to build continuous value alignment with their employees through regular webinars and organisational newsletter and updates.

=== Leadership communication ===
Clear, transparent, and timely communication provided by leaders in the organisation is another important practice to create trust and build a strong organisational culture. It includes communication on organisational value and purpose, updates about organisational operating environment, and the awareness of key projects happening in the team. It also includes leaders providing clear guidance and expectation on how the team and people should performance their jobs, regular catch ups to check in how they are doing and providing timely appreciation and feedback on their performance (LMA, 2023).

=== Employees’ autonomy and innovation ===
Giving employees the autonomy to perform their work and encourage innovation is also very important to foster an engaged organisational culture. People often perform better when they have autonomy over their work because they feel they own the process and the product delivered, and they also feel trusted by their leaders. It is important to make sure they have the freedom to operate in their work and the ability to use technology and resources to apply their creative thinking to all aspects of the organisation (Wong, 2023). Through autonomy and innovation, people will feel valued and recognised, and a sense of ownership and belonging to the organisation.

=== Workplace practices ===
Based off some research, promoting flexible working, diversity and inclusion in the workplace are also great practices for creating positive culture. Employees can put an increasing focus on how an organisation supports their work-life balance. Flexible working provides people with choices of their work locations and hours; it gives people the flexibility to choose what is the best for them and their family. Family-friendly culture in the organisation creates a healthy work environment (Feeney & Stritch, 2019); When the organisation has a culture of family support, it can help organizations attract, recruit, and retain employees (Carless & Wintle, 2007; Lee & Hong, 2011).

Diversity and inclusion are also important practices to enhance organisational culture. This means that people of different gender, ethnicity, culture, background, and beliefs are treated equally at their work in performance recognition and career progression. People are supported to bring their whole self to work and are empowered to be the best of themselves.

Although organisational culture is intangible, it can be assessed through employee surveys, the percent of presentism and absenteeism in the organisation, it can also reflect in its organisational recruitment success rate and staff turnover rate. This information can send signals to the leaders on the current state of its organisational culture.

Public sector organizations have increasingly focused on organizational culture as a factor in attracting and retaining employees. Areas of focus have included value alignment, leadership communication, employee autonomy, innovation, and workplace practices. A supportive organizational culture may contribute to employee retention and recruitment.

== Relevance during economic downturn ==
The 'War for talent is seen by various sources as becoming irrelevant during economic downturns. However, there have been highly visible talent poaching by solvent firms of others who have economic hardship (e.g., JP Morgan was raided by a European firm in March, 2009).

== See also ==
- Talent management
- Aptitude
