= Jeff Harnar =

American cabaret singer (born 1959)

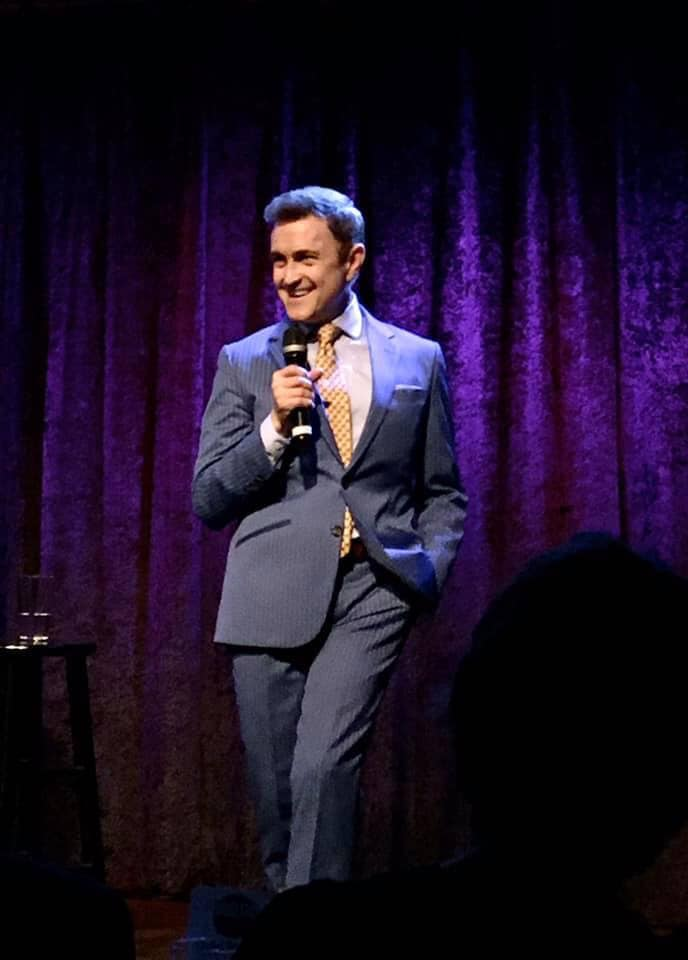
- Harnar in 2019

Background information
- Born: July 27, 1959 (age 67); Manhattan Beach, California, U.S.
- Genres: Pop standards, showtunes
- Label: PS Classics
- Website: www.jeffharnar.com

Jeff Harnar is an American cabaret singer, director, and recording artist.

== Early life and education ==
Harnar's family relocated often when he was a child, living in California, Chicago and elsewhere. During this period of his life he was "dreaming and planning for a career in musical comedy". He transferred from Southern Methodist University to New York University. Harnar's early hopes of Broadway roles were met with scarce opportunities, so he transitioned to cabaret.

== Career ==
Harnar has performed for over four decades at cabaret venues in New York: the Oak Room at the Algonquin Hotel, Feinstein's 54 Below, Feinstein's at the Regency, The Firebird Cafe, The Ballroom, The Russian Tea Room, the Laurie Beechman Theatre, and Birdland; in Los Angeles and San Francisco: the Hollywood Roosevelt Hotel and the Plush Room at the York Hotel; and The Pheasantry in London.

Harnar has collaborated with cabaret, jazz, and musical theatre artists including KT Sullivan, Liz Callaway, Nicholas King, Nicole Zuraitis,MOIPEI Trio, Jon Weber, Sondra Lee, Clint Holmes, Sally Mayes, Gabrielle Stravelli, Julie Wilson, and The McGuire Sisters (opening act).

Directing cabaret, he has worked with Tovah Feldshuh, Rita Gardner, Dawn Derow, Richard Holbrook, Josephine Sanges, Craig Rubano, Renee Katz, Margo Brown, Judi Mark, Anna Bergman, Becca Kidwell, and Ari Axelrod.

== Critical reception ==
Reviewer Stephen Holden commented that while Harnar fit the mold of Robert Morse, the dearth of Broadway musical comedy roles led to Harnar's emulating Michael Feinstein instead. In 1991, Holden observed Harnar's evolution from an overly emotive performance style to a more controlled manner with both comic and lyrical strengths. When Harnar performed Vincente Minnelli's songs, Holden perceived Harnar's pop baritone as a "hybrid between Larry Kert and Johnny Mathis". In 2008, Holden added that Harnar and Cole Porter were a "perfect fit", while Harnar's earlier performance of Cy Coleman's songbook showed their stylistic differences. In Harnar's 2013 show, Holden identified a tone of self-lacerating critique and a style of humor that was "lightly dusted with arsenic", versus Harnar's more chipper manner in decades past. Holden noted that Harnar's 2014 performance with KT Sullivan subverted gender roles, bending familiar songs to "reflect the era of same-sex marriage, gender fluidity and the dissolution of traditional roles".

Regarding Harnar's performance of Sammy Cahn's songbook, Liza Minnelli reportedly said “I wish Sammy could have heard this; he would have loved it. I certainly did.”

== Awards ==
Harnar has won MAC Awards (Manhattan Association of Cabarets) for best male vocalist, major male artist, celebrity artist, outstanding revue, major recording, and best director. He received Bistro Awards for best newcomer, best male vocalist, outstanding show, outstanding revue, and best director.

Harnar has won five BroadwayWorld Cabaret Awards as a performer and two as a director. He was awarded the Mabel Mercer Foundation Mabel Mercer Award in 2022, received the Donald F. Smith Award in 2015, and received the Noël Coward Cabaret Award in 2012. He became the National Honoree of the Chicago Cabaret Professionals in 2022.

== Discography ==
=== Albums ===
- Jeff Harnar Sings Sammy Cahn: The Second Time Around (PS Classics 2024)
- A Collective Cy: Jeff Harnar Sings Cy Coleman (PS Classics, 2023)
- I Know Things Now: My Life in Sondheim's Words (PS Classics, 2022)
- Dancing In The Dark (PS Classics, 2005)
- Sammy Cahn: All the Way (Jerome Records, 2001)
- Because of You: Fifties Gold (Varèse Sarabande Records,1997)
- 1959 Broadway Songbook (Original Cast Records, 1991)
