= Jeff Bagwell =

American baseball player (born 1968)

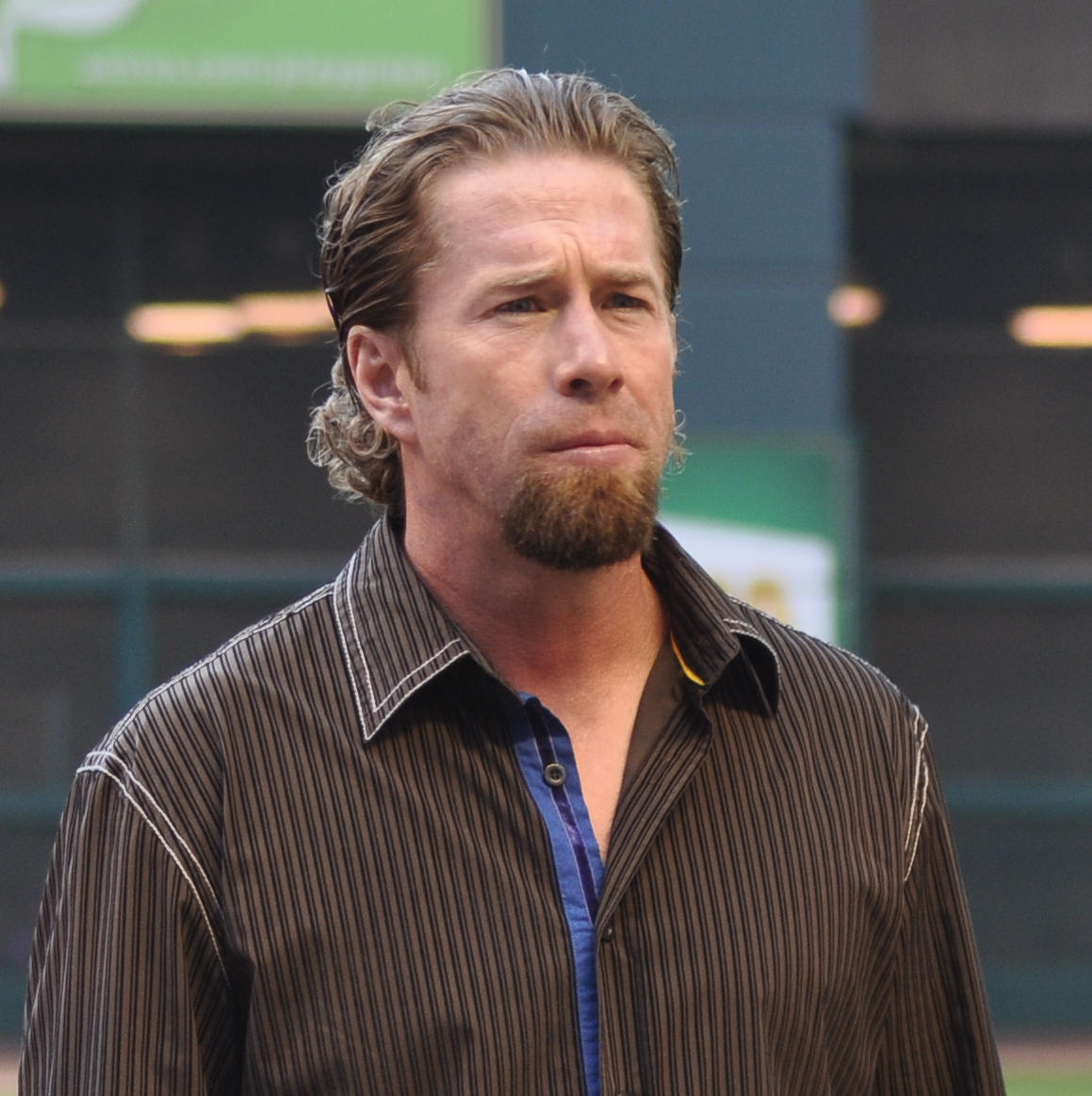
- Bagwell in 2009
- First baseman
- Born: May 27, 1968 (age 58); Boston, Massachusetts, U.S.
- Batted: Right Threw: Right

MLB debut
- April 8, 1991, for the Houston Astros

Last MLB appearance
- October 2, 2005, for the Houston Astros

MLB statistics
- Batting average: .297
- Hits: 2,314
- Home runs: 449
- Runs batted in: 1,529
- Stats at Baseball Reference

Teams
- Houston Astros (1991–2005)

Career highlights and awards
- 4× All-Star (1994, 1996, 1997, 1999); NL MVP (1994); NL Rookie of the Year (1991); Gold Glove Award (1994); 3× Silver Slugger Award (1994, 1997, 1999); NL RBI leader (1994); Houston Astros No. 5 retired; Houston Astros Hall of Fame

Member of the National

Baseball Hall of Fame
- Induction: 2017
- Vote: 86.2% (seventh ballot)

Jeffrey Robert Bagwell (born May 27, 1968) is an American former professional baseball player and coach. A first baseman, he spent his entire 15-year Major League Baseball (MLB) playing career with the Houston Astros.

Originally a Boston Red Sox fourth-round selection from the University of Hartford in the 1989 amateur draft, Bagwell was traded to the Astros in 1990. Bagwell was named the National League (NL) Rookie of the Year in 1991 and won the NL Most Valuable Player Award (MVP) in 1994. Bagwell and longtime Astros second baseman Craig Biggio and teammate Lance Berkman were known as the "Killer B's", and the team experienced consistent success during their careers; Houston finished in first or second place in the NL Central division in eleven of twelve seasons from 1994 to 2005. During that period, the Astros qualified for the playoffs six times, culminating in Bagwell's lone World Series appearance in 2005.

Bagwell hit 449 home runs for the Astros, the most in club history, and set numerous other franchise career and single-season records. He is a four-time MLB All-Star, a three-time Silver Slugger winner and a Gold Glove recipient. The only player in MLB history to have six consecutive seasons (1996–2001) with thirty home runs, 100 RBIs, 100 runs scored, and 100 walks, Bagwell is one of twelve players in history to hit 400 home runs and record an on-base percentage (OBP) of .400. He is the only first baseman with at least 400 home runs and 200 stolen bases. Overall, Bagwell batted over .300 six times, had a career OBP of .408 (39th all-time), and had a slugging percentage of .540 (32nd all-time). He was elected to the Texas Sports Hall of Fame in 2005. In 2017, Bagwell was elected to the National Baseball Hall of Fame.

== Early life ==
Born in Boston, Massachusetts, as the only son of Janice (née Hare) and Robert Bagwell, Jeff Bagwell and his family moved to Killingworth, Connecticut, when he was one year old. Much of Bagwell's family is from the Greater Boston area, including both his parents, and are avid fans of the Boston Red Sox.

His favorite baseball player, Carl Yastrzemski, was a longtime left fielder for the Red Sox. Robert, from Watertown, pitched college baseball at Northeastern University and as a semi-professional. Janice, a police officer, grew up in Newton and played softball in local Boston leagues until her 20s. Bagwell's parents divorced when he was 11. Precocious and demonstrating much athletic ability early in life, he played a wide variety of sports as a youth. Recalled Janice, Jeff "could throw a ball before he could walk. When he was six months old, we'd throw a ball to him and he would throw it back."

Bagwell graduated from Xavier High School, a private all-male Catholic school located in Middletown, Connecticut. A versatile athlete, he excelled at soccer, setting the school goal-scoring mark, played shortstop, and lettered in basketball. In early 1989, Bagwell was honored by Xavier for his character and generosity. He also excelled in American Legion Baseball under coach Fred Tremalgia for Post 75 in Middletown and went on to be named the 2003 American Legion Baseball Graduate of the Year.

== College career ==
Bill Denehy, head coach of the University of Hartford, offered Bagwell a scholarship in spite of baseball not being his primary sport. Bagwell's acceptance of Hartford's baseball scholarship was based at least in part on the lack of a professional soccer league in the United States at the time. At Hartford, Denehy switched Bagwell to third base. Over three seasons playing for Hartford, he batted .413 in 400 at bats, a school record, and, for a time, a New England collegiate record. He also was the school's career home run (31) and run batted in (126) leader when he was drafted, and a two-time Eastern College Athletic Conference player of the year. In 1987 and 1988, he played collegiate summer baseball for the Chatham A's of the Cape Cod Baseball League, and in 1988 was named the starting third baseman for the East Division in the league's annual all-star game.

== Professional career ==
=== Draft and minor leagues ===
The Boston Red Sox selected Bagwell in the fourth round (110th overall) of the 1989 Major League Baseball draft. Throughout his career, Barry Axelrod served as his agent. For his first professional assignment, the Red Sox appointed Bagwell to the Single-A Winter Haven Red Sox of the Florida State League in 1989, where he batted .310 with two home runs. In 1990, while playing for the Double-A New Britain Red Sox, Bagwell won the Eastern League Most Valuable Player Award. In 136 games with New Britain, he batted .333 with 160 hits, four home runs (HR), 61 runs batted in (RBI), 34 doubles, seven triples, 73 bases on balls (BB or walks), 57 strikeouts (SO), .422 on-base percentage (OBP), .457 slugging percentage (SLG) and .880 on-base plus slugging percentage (OPS). He finished first in the league in hits and doubles, second in batting, OBP and OPS, fourth in walks, fifth in SLG, ninth in runs scored and tenth in RBI.

Late in the 1990 season, the Red Sox, who were in search of relief pitching to improve their chances of making the playoffs, contacted the Houston Astros about Larry Andersen. Stan Benjamin, who scouted the New England region for the Astros, recommended that they ask for Bagwell in return. The Astros initially hesitated owing to his sparse home run production, but Benjamin persuaded them, quipping that New Britain's Beehive Field was so large that "Babe Ruth couldn't hit home runs in that ballpark."^{[a]} On August 30, 1990, the Red Sox took the Astros' offer. The trade is now considered one of the most one-sided trades in baseball history; in 2001, ESPN's readers named it the second-worst trade in sports history, behind only the Red Sox trading Ruth to the New York Yankees. Although Andersen pitched well down the stretch in 1990, he allowed three runs in 22 innings to help the Red Sox secure the American League East division title on the final day of the season, the Oakland Athletics swept them out of the American League Championship Series (ALCS). They then lost Andersen after the season when he was declared a "new-look" free agent due to the third collusion settlement.

According to the Red Sox' then-general manager, Lou Gorman, the trade made sense at the time. Gorman spent the ensuing years defending the decision-making process that led up to the Bagwell trade. In his 2005 autobiography, One Pitch from Glory, Gorman noted that Boston already had Wade Boggs at the major league level at third base, and had rated prospects Tim Naehring and Scott Cooper higher than Bagwell on the organization's depth chart. Bagwell had seen some time in the minors at first base, but he was blocked from that position by Mo Vaughn. Gorman pursued Andersen only after receiving assurances from MLB's player relations committee that Andersen would not be lost to the new-look free agency. Nevertheless, it is considered one of the most one-sided trades in baseball history. Not only did the Red Sox lose Andersen to free agency after one month, but both Naehring and Cooper were out of baseball by 1997. The disproportionate results of the trade notwithstanding, Bagwell eventually became acquainted with Andersen and they formed a friendship. "I knew LA and I love him," Bagwell asserted. "He used to make fun of me when I was playing bad. He said, 'you're making me look bad, you have to step it up.' Look up his numbers. He was pretty good at what he did."

=== Houston Astros ===
Bagwell spent his entire major-league career with the Houston Astros. Alongside teammate Craig Biggio, he was associated with the group of Astros players known as the “Killer B’s” during the 1990s and 2000s. From 1994 to 2003, Bagwell and Biggio combined for nine All-Star selections, five Gold Glove Awards, five top-five finishes in Most Valuable Player voting, 689 home runs, 2,485 runs batted in and 3,083 runs scored. During this period, the Astros reached the postseason six times.

With an exaggerated and unusual batting style, Bagwell waited for each pitch in a low crouch, with legs wide open and knees bent nearly 90 degrees, appearing as if he was sitting on an invisible bench. He stepped back with his front foot as he began his swing. Next, he would rise from his stance and rotate his hands with the bat forward into his powerful, uppercut swing. "That wide stance keeps him from over striding", Joe Torre observed, "which can be your biggest problem when you're trying to hit for power." The low crouch also shrunk his strike zone, allowing him to walk more often. Standing 6 feet tall (72 inches (180 cm)) and weighing 195 pounds (88 kg), he did not present the image of an imposing, home run-hitting giant that would cause pitchers to be very careful when he batted after he began his major league career.

==== Rookie of the Year Award and early career (1991–1993) ====
The Astros invited Bagwell to major league camp in spring training of 1991. Bagwell, expecting for the club to assign him to their Triple-A affiliate in Tucson, enthused them with his play. Because they, too, already had an established major leaguer at third base in Ken Caminiti, they approached Bagwell about shifting to first base, which he accepted. Having not previously played the position as a regular, Bagwell received a crash course, playing minor league games in the morning and Astros games in the afternoon until Opening Day. Observed The Sporting News: "Rookie Jeff Bagwell never played first base before this spring, but the position is his to lose. It's up to his bat." Thus, Bagwell made the major league club without an assignment to AAA, making the uncommon jump from AA to the major leagues, and made his major league debut on Opening Day. On May 6, he hit the ninth-ever upper-deck home run at Three Rivers Stadium off Bob Kipper in a seventh-inning pinch hit appearance, estimated at 456 feet (139 m). Bagwell hit .350 in September. He finished the year hitting .294 with 15 home runs and 82 RBI while leading the Astros in several offensive categories. He was named the 1991 National League (NL) Rookie of the Year, the first Astros player to win the award, Baseball America's Rookie of the Year, The Sporting News Rookie of the Year and postseason All-Star and on the Topps' Rookie All-Star Team.

Bagwell's power hike piqued the curiosity of many baseball observers. In two minor league seasons from 1989 to 1990, he had managed six home runs in 932 at bats–a ratio of 155 at bats per home run (AB/HR). With 15 home runs in his first year in Houston, that average shrunk to 36.9. He also exhibited extraordinary plate discipline for a rookie: while ranking tenth in the league in walks with 75, his OBP placed fifth at .387. Of the power surge, commented Bagwell to hitting coach Rudy Jaramillo, "That's awesome", to which he reacted, "Awesome? We can get more out of you than that." By altering an approach to contact the pitch with topspin as he did when he arriving to Houston, Jaramillo taught Bagwell to hit with backspin, resulting in a soaring trajectory rather than nose diving. He also habituated Bagwell to manipulate the count, waiting for a pitch to drive instead of indiscriminately swinging at any pitch that appeared to be a strike. Accounted Bagwell of the newfound advantage, "I didn't hit many home runs in the minor leagues, but when I hit one, when I got backspin on it, it went a long way."

Although firmly established as the Astros' first baseman from Opening Day in 1991, Bagwell remarked years later that transitioning from third base was not automatic. First basemen approach fielding plays from their right side, which is opposite to playing third base. He recounted one conversation that occurred during an Astros pitching change in a game against St. Louis. Shortstop Ozzie Smith was on first and asked Bagwell, "How's it going?" Bagwell responded, "I'm really struggling with my backhand." Smith replied, "Well, here's what you do. You can't field the ball deep. You have to get out in front of it." Remarked Bagwell, "I was basically being given a lesson from Ozzie Smith at first base during a pitching change. It's pretty cool."

The next year, Bagwell hit .273, driving in 96 runs with 18 home runs. In 1993, the Astros improved to a third-place finish in the National League West division, and in mid-September, Bagwell was batting .320 with 20 home runs and 88 RBI. However, a pitch from the Philadelphia Phillies' Ben Rivera broke the fourth metacarpal bone in Bagwell's left hand, ending his season prematurely. It was the first of three successive seasons that ended early or was interrupted due to an incoming pitch breaking the same bone in that hand. His tendency to dip just before starting to swing made his hand more vulnerable to being hit by inside pitches. His .320 average was sixth in the NL. In February 1994, Bagwell and the Astros agreed to a one-year contract with a $2.4 million base salary (USD, $5.3 million today).

==== Unanimous selection for Most Valuable Player Award (1994) ====
The most productive season in Bagwell's professional career was the strike-shortened 1994 season which set several franchise records. On Opening Day, April 4, against the Montreal Expos, Bagwell hit the game-tying home run while going 3-for-6 as the Astros won in a 12-inning walk-off. For the month of April, he batted .360 with six home runs and added another six home runs in May. In June, he hit 13 home runs, establishing an Astros' franchise record for one month, while batting .394, 11 doubles, .455 OBP, .899 SLG, and 1.354 OPS. On June 24, in a 16–4 rout of the Los Angeles Dodgers at the Astrodome, he hit three home runs, including two in the same inning, becoming the first Astro since Glenn Davis in 1990 to do so. Bagwell was the NL Player of the Week for consecutive weeks on June 19 and June 26 and the NL Player of the Month for June, his second career monthly award.

Selected to his first All-Star Game as a reserve, Bagwell had tied Kirby Puckett for the major league RBI lead at 81 going into the All-Star break, and batted .348 with 27 home runs and 74 runs scored. In the All-Star Game, Bagwell entered as a pinch hitter for starting pitcher Greg Maddux, singling off David Cone, and wound up collecting two hits in four at bats. The first player in the majors to reach 100 RBI on July 27, Bagwell homered off José Rijo in a 6–5 win over Cincinnati to give him 101 RBI in his first 101 games. In July, he tied a club record for RBI in any month with 29, which José Cruz and Jimmy Wynn shared. and hit .409 with 11 home runs, 20 walks and 1.384 OPS and collected his second consecutive Player of the Month award. He would hit another three home runs with six walks in nine August games before a pitch from Andy Benes fractured his left hand on August 10 and ended his season in the same manner the season before. Entering that game, Bagwell carried an 18-game hitting streak. Two days later, the strike ended the season for all the major leagues. His production accelerated in 26 games after the All-Star break, as he posted a .432 batting average, .530 OBP, .916 SLG, 1.446 OPS, 10 doubles, 12 home runs, 34 RBI and 30 runs scored. The Astros finished one-half game out of first place in the inaugural season of the National League Central division, a product of MLB's division realignment.

Bagwell played in 110 games in the 1994 season, batting .368 with a .750 SLG, 1.201 OPS, 39 home runs, 116 RBI, 104 runs scored, 300 total bases and 213 adjusted OPS (OPS+) in 400 at bats. He led the major leagues in SLG, OPS+, RBI, and total bases, and the NL in runs scored and OPS, but fell short of winning the batting Triple Crown, finishing second for the batting title to Tony Gwynn, who, after batting .394, had the highest average in the major leagues since Ted Williams in 1941. Bagwell finished second in home runs to Matt Williams, who hit 43. Bagwell set the record for the fewest plate appearances in a season reaching 100 of both runs scored and runs driven in and became the first National Leaguer to finish first or second in batting average, home runs, RBI, and runs scored since Willie Mays in 1955. His .750 SLG at the time ranked as the seventh-best ever and was the highest by a National Leaguer since Rogers Hornsby in 1925 (.756). Further, at the time in National League history, the 213 OPS+ trailed only Hornsby's 1924 season (222 OPS+) for the second-highest ever. The 116 RBI in 110 games qualified for the 13th-highest ratio in history. He also hit 23 home runs in 56 games at the Astrodome, setting a record that stood for the stadium that was famed to be pitcher-friendly until the Astros moved out following the 1999 season. He set single-season club records for batting average, SLG, OPS, OPS+, AB/HR, and offensive win percentage (.858), as well as home runs, breaking Wynn's 27-year-old record, and RBI, breaking Bob Watson's record 17 years earlier. Bagwell broke the team home run and RBI records later in his career.

The unanimous winner of the NL Most Valuable Player Award, he became the fourth player in National League history to win by this distinction, and the first Astros player to win the award. Bagwell also won his first Silver Slugger, Gold Glove, and Player of the Year Awards from The Sporting News, Associated Press, Baseball Digest, and USA Today Baseball Weekly. "Crazy stuff happened that year", Bagwell recalled of his 1994 season. "Every pitch that I was looking for, I got. And when I got it, I didn't miss it." The Astros and Bagwell agreed to a four-year contract on November 23, 1994, worth $27.5 million (USD, $59.7 million today) with the three option years. The average annual value of $6.875 million ($14.9 million today) made him the fifth-highest paid player in the majors.

==== Continued peak (1995–96) ====
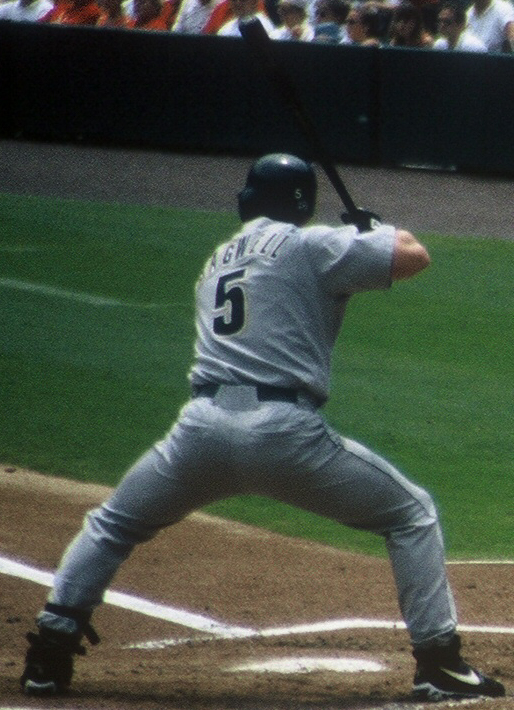
Bagwell was famous for his unique batting stance, as seen here during this at bat for Houston against St. Louis

The 1995 season was shortened by 18 games due to the players' strike that commenced the year before. Bagwell endured a slump through the month of May in which he batted .183. In June, his results started to improve as he batted .339 and followed up in July by driving in 31 runs. Both Bagwell and Derek Bell, included as a "Killer B," registered 31 RBI that month, breaking the monthly club RBI record. Bagwell had tied the previous record one year earlier to the month. He hit his first two career home runs against Maddux of the Atlanta Braves within a week, on May 28 and June 3. Maddux allowed only 8 home runs the entire season. On July 28 against the Colorado Rockies, Bagwell's 10th-inning home run tied the score and two innings later he scored the winning run for a 5–4 final score.

For the third time in three seasons, an incoming pitch broke a bone in Bagwell's left hand: on this occasion, it was on July 30 from the Padres' Brian Williams. Rather than change his successful style, Bagwell resorted to wearing a heavily padded protective batting glove. He returned in September to bat .313 with five home runs and 21 RBI as Houston finished one game behind the Rockies for the NL wild card. Bagwell missed 30 games, appearing in 114 and batted .290 with 21 home runs. He won the 1995 ESPY Awards for Best Breakthrough Athlete and Outstanding Baseball Performer (later renamed "Best Major League Baseball Player"). After the season, he commenced a rigorous training program that enabled him to gain 20 pounds and increased his endurance for the long season. Activities of focus included concentrated weightlifting, change of diet, and the use of creatine and androstenedione.

By the start of the 1996 season, Bagwell and Biggio had gained seniority, even if not necessarily by age, within the Astros clubhouse as well as status as superstars. According to sportswriter Dayn Perry, the earliest recorded reference to an Astros version of the nickname "Killer B's" encountered via a Google Search occurred that year. Bagwell enforced accountability and preparation which fostered camaraderie and incorporated all players as instrumental to the success of the team. Thus, the Astros raised their level of play, and a new string of playoff appearances followed. In time, all who entered the Astros gym were greeted with a banner that read: "Bagwell's Gym. Work Hard. Play Hard. Or Leave."

On May 7 against Philadelphia, Bagwell reached the 500th RBI of his career with two home runs and four RBI. By hitting his second upper-deck home run at Three Rivers Stadium on May 29 — it travelled 459 feet (140 m) — Bagwell joined longtime Pirate Willie Stargell as the only players to homer twice into the stadium's upper deck. For the month of May, he batted .360 with .740 SLG, 10 home runs, 31 RBI, 22 runs scored, and four stolen bases. He was named NL Player of the Month, his fourth career monthly award. On June 14, Bagwell tied a major league record with four doubles in one game against San Francisco. He played all 162 games that year, batting .315 with a 1.021 OPS, 31 home runs, 120 RBI, 111 runs scored, and 135 walks. With 21 successful stolen bases in 28 attempts, it was his first season in the 20–20 club, that is, to steal 20 bases while hitting 20 home runs in the same season. Bagwell reached base 324 total times and in all but 11 games. He led the NL in doubles with 48 while earning his second All-Star selection and finishing ninth in the MVP voting.

Rumors had surfaced during the 1996 season that manager Terry Collins did not get along well with Bagwell and Biggio, largely contributing to his dismissal. The Astros hired team color commentator Larry Dierker after the season to replace him. According to his autobiography, This Ain't Brain Surgery, Dierker was asked during the interview how he would handle the players. His response: "'Look, I'm tired of this Bagwell and Biggio s---,' I said. 'Bagwell and Biggio will not be a problem, believe me.' I now believe that this statement is the one that got me the job." The Astros won division titles in four of five seasons with Dierker as manager; however, in each instance, they did not advance past the first round of the playoffs, and 2001 was Dierker's last season as the club's manager.

==== First two playoff appearances (1997–98) ====
The 1,000th hit of Bagwell's career was a home run on May 20, 1997, off Calvin Maduro, one of his two that game, in a 9–5 win over the Philadelphia Phillies. He was selected to the play in the All-Star Game. Exhibiting above-average speed and baserunning skills for a first baseman, Bagwell became the first full-time first baseman to join the 30–30 club, capping the 1997 season with 31 steals in 41 attempts. The only other first baseman to accomplish the 30–30 club is Joe Carter. Bagwell batted .286 and scored 109 runs. He finished second in the league with both 43 home runs and 135 RBI, his career high in RBI. He was third in the MVP balloting. He made the playoffs for the first time in 1997 when the Astros won the National League Central division, the club's first appearance in 11 years. The Astros faced the Atlanta Braves in the National League Division Series (NLDS), who swept them in three games. Bagwell, Biggio and Bell combined for two hits in 37 at bats.

In 1998, Bagwell informed a Houston Chronicle reporter that he was using androstenedione (commonly referred to as "andro"), which at the time the United States Food and Drug Administration (FDA) classified it as a nutritional dietary supplement, finding it benign and authorized for non-medicinal purposes. It was considered a "weak" androgen steroid hormone and allegedly in widespread use around the sport at the time.^{[c]} Bagwell hit his first career grand slam while tying a career-high six RBI against Cincinnati on September 8 in a 13–7 victory. It was his 218th career home run, making his streak the then-longest among active players without a grand slam.

Bagwell finished the 1998 season batting .304 with 34 home runs, 111 RBI, 124 runs scored, 19 stolen bases, 109 walks, .424 OBP, .557 SLG, .981 OPS. He ranked third in the league in runs scored and walks, fifth in OPS+, sixth in OBP, and eighth in OPS. The Astros won a franchise-best 102 games while winning the NL Central division title, leading the league in runs scored. Their season ended by defeat to the San Diego Padres in the NLDS, including losing two starts against Kevin Brown — both by a 2–1 score. Bagwell, Bell, and Biggio combined for six hits in 51 at bats in this series.

==== MVP runner-up and second player with multiple 40–30 seasons (1999) ====
Bagwell's former high school, Xavier, officially retired his uniform number 9 in a commemoration on January 30, 1999. As the "Killer B's" brand gained increased national attention, journalist Dayn Perry jocosely noted that in 1999 the Astros, "in pursuit of arcane history, used eight players whose last names began with 'B'", including Bagwell, Paul Bako, Glen Barker, Bell, Sean Bergman, Lance Berkman, Biggio, and Tim Bogar. On April 21, Bagwell hit three home runs in a 10–3 win against the Chicago Cubs at Wrigley Field, his second career three-home run game. The second home run allowed him to overtake Wynn as the Astros' all-time home run leader at 224 and he tied a career-high with six RBI in one game. Bagwell produced another three-home run game on June 9 against the Chicago White Sox that was a grand slam short of the "home run cycle", accounted with a solo home run, a three-run home run, and a two-run home run, respectively. The two three-home run games made him the only player to accomplish this feat at two different stadiums in Chicago in the same season.

Nominated to his fourth career All-Star Game, Bagwell to that point in the season had scored or driven in 28.6% of the Astros' runs, the highest portion of a team's offense for which any one player in MLB accounted. He was first in the NL in walks (83), runs scored (81) and OBP (.464), second in home runs (28), RBI (78) and SLG (.648) and stole 17 bases while Houston remained percentage points behind Cincinnati for first in the division. On August 20, 1999, he walked a major-league record six times in a 16-inning battle against the Florida Marlins. In 1999, Bagwell lead the major leagues in runs scored (143), bases on balls (149), and games played (162). He also batted .304, hit 42 home runs, 126 RBI, and .591 SLG and stole 30 bases, giving him his second 30–30 season. Further, he and Barry Bonds were the only major leaguers to achieve the 40–30 mark (40 home runs and 30 stolen bases) twice. The Astros overtook the Reds to clinch the NL Central division title in 1999, their third consecutive. They faced Atlanta in an NLDS rematch of two years prior but were defeated in four games. On the NL MVP ballot, Bagwell finished second to the Braves' Chipper Jones, and won his third Silver Slugger Award.

==== National League runs scored record (2000) ====
In a presentation of rankings of active major leaguers prior to the 2000 season, Sports Illustrated slotted Bagwell second among position players behind Ken Griffey Jr., and The Sporting News placed him sixth among all players, including pitchers. Bagwell christened the team's 2000 move to Enron Field (later renamed Minute Maid Park) with the stadium's first-ever hit and first two runs driven in, in a 6–5 exhibition victory over the New York Yankees on March 30. His two-run, ninth-inning home run against Trevor Hoffman in San Diego on June 10 won the contest for Houston, 7–6, and stopped a 10-game road losing streak. On August 14 in Philadelphia, he homered twice and tied a club record with seven RBI in a 14–7 win, shared by Rafael Ramírez and Pete Incaviglia. Five days later against Milwaukee, Bagwell again homered twice for the 299th and 300th of his career; the second home run broke an eighth-inning tie to give Houston a 10–8 win. He joined Hank Aaron, Joe DiMaggio, Frank Robinson and Ted Williams as the fifth player in major league history to record 300 home runs, 1,000 RBI and 1,000 runs scored in his first ten seasons.

Bagwell finished the 2000 season with a career-high 47 home runs, .310 average, .424 OBP, .615 SLG (the second-best mark of his career) for a 152 OPS+. His 152 runs scored was the highest total in a season since Lou Gehrig in 1936, and his 295 runs scored from 1999 to 2000 set a National League two-season record. His pair of cleats from the 2000 season were turned in for display at the National Baseball Hall of Fame and Museum. On December 20, 2000, Bagwell and the Astros agreed to a five-year, $85 million (USD, $158.9 million today) contract extension. With an average annual value of $17 million, he became the third-highest paid player in the sport at the time. By 2005, he was the seventh-highest paid player in the sport, receiving $18 million in the fourth year of the deal.

==== Sixth consecutive season of 30 HR, 100 RBI, 100 runs scored and 100 BB (2001) ====
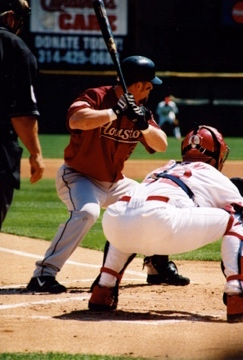
Bagwell at bat for the Astros later in his career

With a triple on May 7, 2001, against Chicago, Bagwell achieved the 700th extra base hit of his career. For the second time in his career, he reached seven RBI in a game — again tying a club record — at Kansas City on July 7. Over four successive games from July 8–13, Bagwell homered and totaled five home runs in that span. In a contest at Enron Field against the St. Louis Cardinals on July 18, he hit for the cycle. He went 4-for-5 with five RBI as the Astros won, 17–11. He was the NL Player of the Month that July after batting .333 with nine home runs, and breaking his own club record with 36 RBI in a month, exceeding the 34 RBI in the previous August.

While hitting his 32nd home run on August 19, 2001, against Pittsburgh, Bagwell collected his 100th RBI. It was the sixth consecutive season he reached at least 30 home runs and 100 RBI, making him the eighth player in MLB history to achieve such a streak, and the only Houston player to do so. Five days later, also against Pittsburgh, he scored his 100th run, joining Jimmie Foxx, Lou Gehrig, and Babe Ruth as the only players in MLB history with six consecutive seasons of 30 homers, 100 RBI and 100 runs scored. On September 30 at Chicago, Bagwell walked for his 100th of the season, thus making him the only player in MLB history to register six consecutive seasons of at least 30 home runs, 100 RBI, 100 runs scored, and 100 walks. The Astros won the NL Central division title and faced the Atlanta Braves in the NLDS. In spite of Bagwell reaching base in eight of 12 plate appearances by single or by walk, he did not score any runs, and the Braves swept the Astros in three games.

Playing with sound health until 2001, an explosive pain started to progress in his left shoulder during the season. Bagwell underwent surgery to remove bone spurs and to reconstruct a partially torn labrum on October 26, 2001. He had also began to develop arthritis in his right shoulder, which gradually worsened and diminished his playing ability.

==== Other milestones (2002–03) ====
For the first three months of the 2002 season, Bagwell labored greatly with throwing; he still had not fully recovered from offseason shoulder surgery. Even after the shoulder improved, it was noticeably weaker than two years prior. In July, he batted .349 with six home runs and 23 RBI. Before a game against the San Diego Padres on August 27, he met with an 11-year-old bone cancer patient named Stephen Rael who asked him to hit a home run for him. Bagwell replied, "I'm going to try, but I'm not Babe Ruth." In the fifth inning, he hit a pitch from Mike Bynum over the left field wall and pointed to the child in the stands as he rounded third base. He later said, "I hit the home run, and he felt it was for him. I'm glad for that. It made it special." From August 10–24, Bagwell produced a season-high 15-game hitting streak, marking the 12th consecutive season with at least one double-digit hit streak, a club record, and second to Roberto Alomar with 14 among all then-active players. In September, he batted .343 with 11 multiple-hit games.

During a 3–2 loss to the Montreal Expos on April 26, 2003, Bagwell's infield single gave him 2,000 hits for his career, joining Biggio as the only Astro to achieve this mark. Bagwell collected the assist for the final out of a combined no-hitter and 8–0 win over the Yankees on June 11. He scooped a ground ball batted from Hideki Matsui and relayed it to Billy Wagner covering first base, the final of a record six pitchers participating in the feat. Playing the Cincinnati Reds on July 20, 2003, Bagwell hit two home runs for the 400th of his career off Danny Graves, becoming the 35th player in MLB history to do so. ESPN's "The List" ranked Bagwell as the second-most underrated athlete of the top four North American professional sports leagues in August 2003, and Biggio third.

==== Milestones of 1,500 RBI, 1,500 runs scored and 200 stolen bases (2004) ====
When he hit his sixth career grand slam against Milwaukee on April 9, 2004, Bagwell tied a club record. He recorded his 200th career stolen base on August 30 against Cincinnati to become the tenth player in MLB history to reach that plateau while hitting 400 home runs. On September 18, 2004, Bagwell collected his 1,500th career RBI with a single in the third inning against the Brewers. Two innings later, he homered for his 1,500th run scored, becoming just the 29th player in MLB history and the first Astro to reach both milestones. Bagwell finished with 27 home runs, stopping a streak of eight consecutive seasons with at least 30, but extending a streak of 12 with at least 20.

The Astros faced the Braves in the playoffs for the fourth time in Bagwell's career in the 2004 NLDS. In Game 3, on October 7, he hit his first career postseason home run off Mike Hampton in the first inning in a 4–2 extra-inning loss. After three failed attempts to advance past the first round of the playoffs earlier in Bagwell's career, losing to Atlanta in 1997, 1999, and 2001, and seven overall in 43 years of franchise history, the Astros defeated the Braves for their first-ever playoff series win. The quartet dubbed the "Killer B's," this time including Carlos Beltrán and Lance Berkman, ignited the Astros' offense, batting .395 (34-for-86) with eight home runs, 21 RBI and 24 runs scored. The Astros scored an NLDS-record 36 runs in all and Bagwell batted .318 with two home runs and five RBI. They advanced to Bagwell's first National League Championship Series (NLCS) to face the Cardinals. St. Louis defeated Houston in seven games to advance to the World Series.

==== Health issues and World Series drive (2005) ====
Bagwell posing with a group of fans

In February 2005, Bagwell and Biggio were jointly inducted into the Texas Sports Hall of Fame. Shortly after the 2005 season began, the chronic arthritic condition in his shoulder that had begun in 2001 finally sidelined him, rendering him inactive for three-quarters of the season. The former Gold Glove winner was now a defensive liability with a severely limited throwing arm; he had to "push" the ball instead of throwing it. Teams began taking advantage of his defensive weakness. Once possessing great ability to throw out the lead runner at third base ahead on bunt plays, Bagwell found it difficult to practice with the other infielders between innings.

Concurrently, Bagwell's offensive production suffered, and pressure mounted on Astros management to bench the perennial All-Star; the club had started the season with a 15–30 won–loss record. He hit his last major league home run against Maddux on April 29, tying him for the most against any pitcher with seven. Bagwell continued to play through the pain until, after going 0-for-5 in a loss to the Pirates on May 4, it became so unbearable that he asked manager Phil Garner to remove him from the lineup the following day. He had hit just .250 with three home runs in 88 at-bats. The Astros placed him on the disabled list a few days later, and shoulder surgery followed.

The Astros dramatically improved after their poor start to finish 74–43 over their final 117 games and capture the NL wild card. Rendered unable to throw from his surgery, Bagwell was activated in September as a pinch hitter, and he played a symbolic role in the successful drive to capture their first-ever National League pennant and World Series appearance. Moreover, the Astros secured the pennant against their division rival St. Louis Cardinals in the NLCS, reversing the outcome from the year prior against the same club.

After having played 4,714 games and their entire major league careers together in Houston, Bagwell and Biggio appeared in their first World Series in 2005. Bagwell was the Astros' designated hitter in the first two games against the White Sox at U.S. Cellular Field, and was a pinch hitter in the two games played in Houston at Minute Maid Park. His last official major league plate appearance was in the seventh inning of Game 4, when he pinch-hit for pitcher Brandon Backe and grounded out. The White Sox won this contest to sweep the Astros and secure the championship. The White Sox outscored the Astros by a combined six runs, the lowest scoring differential in World Series history.

Together with Biggio, and longtime Astros executive Tal Smith, Bagwell received Baseball America's Lifetime Achievement Award after the 2005 season.

==== Comeback attempt and retirement (2006) ====
On January 23, 2006, the Astros indicated that they would file a claim on an insurance policy on Bagwell's health to collect approximately $15.6 million of the $17 million in salary owed to him for the 2006 season. Days earlier, orthopedic surgeon Dr. James Andrews had performed a physical examination on Bagwell and determined that he had become "completely disabled" and was unable to play baseball again. Because of the language of the policy, the Astros could not release him without losing their settlement, nor could he take the field. The decision effectively eliminated his chances of playing again in the Major Leagues. On March 28, Cigna rejected the claim, contending that because Bagwell had played during 2005 World Series he could not have become more disabled during the period of baseball inactivity characteristic of the offseason.

Nonetheless, Bagwell still reported to spring training hoping he could contribute in some way during the upcoming 2006 campaign, and to test the injured shoulder. His mere presence in camp put the Astros' insurance claim into further question, creating an awkward situation between the player and the team. He appeared in 14 spring training games, batting .219 with one double. He never had to make any difficult throws that would place notable stress on his shoulder, as the other infielders shifted toward him. As expected, the Astros put him on the 15-day disabled list in late March with bone spurs in the shoulder. Bagwell disclosed that he was only in good enough condition to play every several days, rather than every day. He was eventually paid the full amount of his contract. The Astros and the insurance company settled the claim in a confidential arrangement the same day he announced his retirement.

The Astros declined to pick up Bagwell's $18 million club option for 2007, instead buying it out for $7 million. He filed for free agency in November 2006 but announced his retirement one month later. Owner Drayton McLane and general manager Tim Purpura stated that he would remain in player development department of the Astros organization, as one of the assistants to the general manager.

== After retirement ==
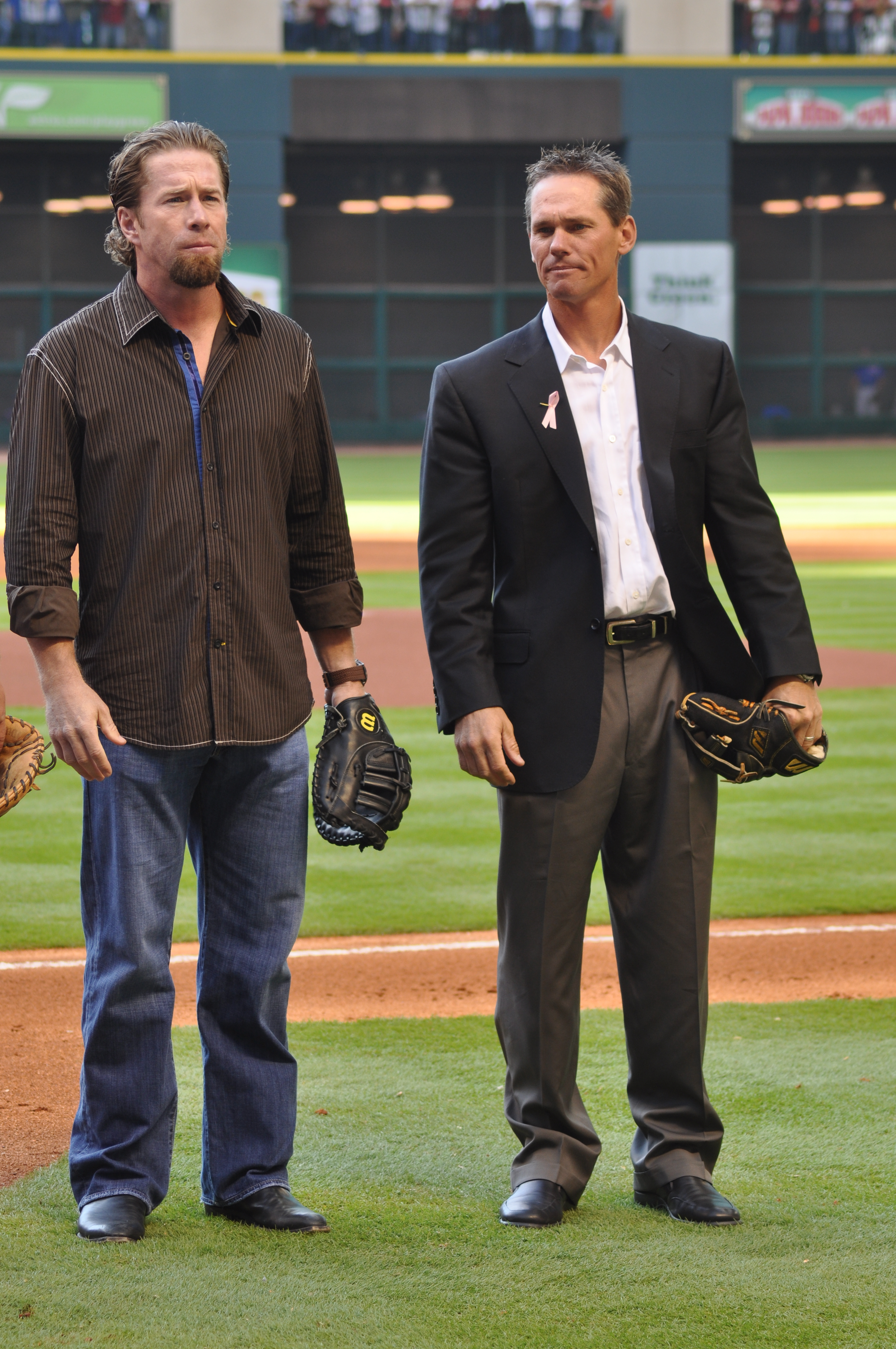
Bagwell (left) with Craig Biggio in 2009. The two future Hall of Fame players formed the core of the Killer B's.

Bagwell made his first public appearance at Minute Maid Park since the end of his career on June 28, 2007, where Craig Biggio had just logged his 3,000th career hit in the seventh inning against the Colorado Rockies. Awaiting in the dugout, Bagwell emerged to congratulate him as fans cheered with a lengthy standing ovation. Having momentarily quieted, the cheering for Biggio once again erupted the moment Biggio ushered Bagwell back onto the playing field and to the first-base line. Remarked Biggio, "the thing with Baggy is that he and I worked so hard here for this city and for this organization. We made so many sacrifices as far as playing the game and giving your body to a city, a team." Together, they bowed to the crowd as Bagwell raised Biggio's arm prior to returning to the dugout. Biggio was inducted into the Baseball Hall of Fame in 2015.

The Houston Astros officially retired Bagwell's jersey number 5 on August 26, 2007, during a pre-game ceremony versus the Pittsburgh Pirates. He was the eighth player in Astros history to have his number retired. Two of Bagwell's closest friends and former teammates, Biggio and Brad Ausmus, spoke on his behalf. Said Ausmus, "He was the quintessential teammate. He was a superstar who always put the team before himself. And between him and Bidge (Biggio), they always shouldered the blame we struggled and tried to deflect the credit when we won." Yastrzemski, Bagwell's childhood hero, delivered a special message: "Congratulations, Jeff, on your number being retired. I begged the Red Sox not to trade you when you were in the minors with us. Boston's loss was Houston's gain. See you in Cooperstown." Three first bases were used in the game, each embossed with a commemorative insignia and inscription, "No. 5, Jeff Bagwell jersey retirement, Aug. 26, 2007." One was given to Bagwell and the other two were auctioned to raise funds on behalf of the Astros in Action Foundation.

In 2009, Bagwell received the Bill Shea Distinguished Little League Graduate Award.

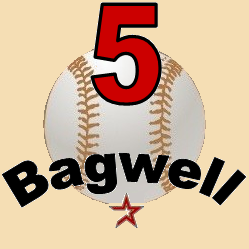
Jeff Bagwell's number 5 was retired by the Houston Astros in 2007.

Bagwell, along with Craig Biggio were on hand to witness the Astros win their first-ever World Series championship at Dodger Stadium on November 1, 2017. Both were elated at their franchise's first championship with Bagwell saying, "I'm ecstatic. They're great kids, they play hard, they never gave up. To see them win, the celebration, excitement, relief...the city of Houston, I'm sure, is going crazy right now. I couldn't be more proud of the guys that represent the Houston Astros right now." Both former teammates received World Series rings from the Astros during the ring presentation ceremony before an April 3, 2018, game against the Baltimore Orioles.

=== Continued employment by the Astros ===
As part of a personal services contract Bagwell signed with the Astros, he served as a coach in spring training of 2007.

On July 11, 2010, the Astros hired Bagwell to be their hitting coach, replacing Sean Berry. At the time of the switch, the Astros had the second-lowest batting average (.237) in the majors and lowest OBP (.295). At the end of the season, the team marginally improved, but was still last in the league in OBP (.303) and SLG (.362) and Bagwell announced he would not return as hitting coach.

After a five-year gap in contact with the Astros organization, Bagwell accepted a formal invitation from manager A. J. Hinch to be a guest instructor in spring training of 2015. He is currently a special advisor to team owner Jim Crane.

On August 24, 2026, Bagwell assumed duties as an interim general manager (GM) of the Astros following the dismissal of Dana Brown, as part of a committee with assistant GMs Charles Cook, Gavin Dickey and Connor Huff. Though the team concluded the season by winning their eighth American League (AL) West division title in ten seasons, they did so with a record of 81–81. They were subsequently swept in the 2026 AL Wild Card Series for the second time in three seasons.

=== Allegations of steroid use and National Baseball Hall of Fame ===
Bagwell was eligible for induction into the Baseball Hall of Fame for the first time in 2011. Speculation abounded that some baseball writers initially refrained from voting for Bagwell on the premise that he used performance-enhancing drugs, since most of his playing career took place during what is commonly referred to as "the steroid era." In spite of the speculation, as of 2016, no concrete evidence has surfaced linking him to the use of performance-enhancing drugs. However, one report indicates that he disclosed use of androstenedione to a Houston Chronicle reporter in 1998. At that time, neither the FDA nor MLB had banned its use. Bagwell has not been connected with any of the 104 positive samples in the 2003 survey tests that were leaked. Bagwell was not among the 89 players named in the Mitchell Report released in 2007.

Longtime Atlanta Braves manager Bobby Cox said the following about Bagwell: "Jeff Bagwell was [in Houston] for so long and starred every year. For me a guy that dominated like that for one team, even in the league stats through the years. His are up there with anybody's. I would put him in right away. So he would get my vote on the first ballot." Still, in spite of the speculation that Bagwell used performance-enhancing drugs, San Francisco Chronicle sportswriter Bruce Jenkins wrote that Bagwell did not have the credentials to be in the Hall of Fame. In July 2015, he acknowledged "that many are suspicious of Bagwell—without proof, as you say. I've always voted for the best players — Bonds, McGwire, Clemens, etc.—so that's not a factor for me. I always found Bagwell just a bit short of Hall of Fame material."

In 2011, Bagwell received 242 votes, or 41.7% of total ballots cast; the threshold for entry is 75%. In his second year on the ballot, he received 321 votes, or 56.0% of the ballots cast. In 2016, he received his highest percentage of the vote to that time, 71.6%. On January 18, 2017, Bagwell was voted into the Hall of Fame with 86.2% of the vote in his seventh year of eligibility. He was inducted on July 30, 2017.

== Highlights ==
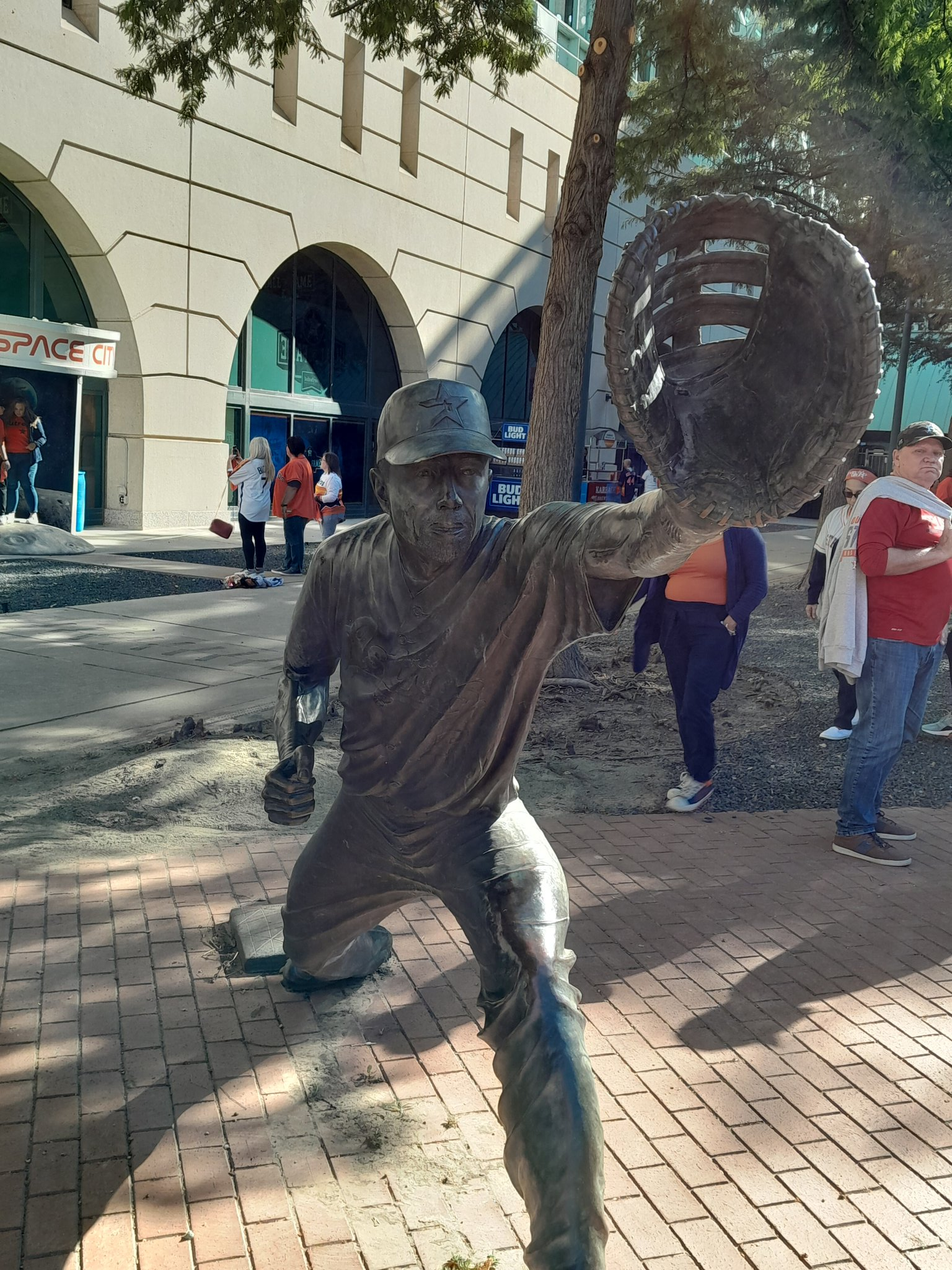
Bagwell was honored with a statue at Minute Maid Park in 2003, which is placed near a statue of his teammate Craig Biggio.

Per Baseball Reference, Bagwell's 79.6 Wins Above Replacement (WAR) ranks sixth-most all-time among first basemen, trailing only Lou Gehrig, Albert Pujols, Jimmie Foxx, Cap Anson, and Roger Connor. He spent the first nine seasons of his career (1991–99) playing home games at the Astrodome, notorious for its reputation as the toughest park in which to hit when baseball was still played there. However, during those nine years, his production at home was nearly identical to his production on the road. In that same period of time, his 160 OPS+ was fourth behind Bonds, McGwire, and Frank Thomas; his 56.7 WAR was third behind Bonds and Ken Griffey Jr. From 1994 to 2000, a span including his age-26 through age-32 seasons, he averaged 41 home runs and 41 doubles per 162 games while batting .309, .433 OBP, and .593 SLG for a 167 OPS+.

Over his career, Bagwell batted at least .300 six times, amassed a 1.000 OPS five times, collected at least 30 home runs eight times, 100 RBI eight times, 100 runs scored nine times, and 100 walks seven times. He is the only player in history to achieve six consecutive seasons (1996–2001) with each of 30 home runs, 100 RBI, 100 runs scored, and 100 walks. Bagwell had seven seasons with 30 home runs and 100 walks; the only players with more are Gehrig, Ruth, Williams, Jim Thome, and Thomas.

Bagwell is one of 12 players in MLB history to hit at 400 home runs and attain a career on-base percentage of at least .400. The only National League first baseman to reach the 30–30 club, he is the only first baseman in history to do it twice. He is also one of only two players in history to have two 40-30 seasons (Barry Bonds being the other). Bagwell is also the only first baseman to reach both 400 home runs and 200 stolen bases. He is just one of 21 players in history to win both a Rookie of the Year Award and an MVP. His 1,529 RBI during the span of his playing career ranked second for all hitters (first among right-handed hitters), and he was fifth in home runs.

He was in the top 10 in the MVP voting five times. From 1994 to 2003, he led all first basemen in stolen bases, doubles, hits, runs, walks, and extra-base hits, was second in games and RBI, and was third in home runs. He is the Astros' all-time leader in home runs and RBI and is the first Astro to win an MVP.

In addition to stealing over 200 bases in his career, Bagwell contributed significantly around the field as a whole. During one series against Pittsburgh in 1994, the Pirates shifted while he batted, and Bagwell responded with seven opposite-field hits. A standout defender at first base, he won the 1994 Gold Glove award. Remarked The Sporting News, "he's an extraordinary fielder who excels at charging bunts and throwing runners out at second and third. Although he has average speed, he's one of the game's smartest baserunners. ..." From 1999 to 2000, his 295 runs scored led the major leagues and set a National League two-season record.

=== Commendations ===
Career honors
Title	Year	Ref
Baseball America Lifetime Achievement Award	2005	
Bill Shea Distinguished Little League Graduate Award	2009	
Houston Astros uniform number 5 retired	2007	
Middletown Sports Hall of Fame inductee	2017	
National Baseball Hall of Fame inductee	2017	
The New Bill James Historical Baseball Abstract fourth-best first baseman of all time	2003	
Texas Baseball Hall of Fame inductee	2004	
Texas Sports Hall of Fame inductee	2005	
University of Hartford Athletics Hall of Fame	1997	
Xavier High School (Connecticut) uniform number 9 retired	1999	

Annual awards
Name of award	No.	Dates	Ref.
Associated Press Player of the Year	1	1994	
Baseball America Rookie of the Year	1	1991	
Darryl Kile Good Guy Award	1	2003	
Eastern College Athletic Conference Player of the Year	2	1988, 1989	
Eastern League Most Valuable Player	1	1990	
ESPY Award for Best Breakthrough Athlete	1	1995	
ESPY Award for Best Major League Baseball Player	1	1995	
Home Run Derby participant	4	1994, 1996, 1997, 1999	
Houston Astros Most Valuable Player	6	1991, 1993, 1994, 1996, 1999, 2000	
Major League Baseball All-Star	4	1994, 1996, 1997, 1999	
National League Most Valuable Player	1	1994	
National League Player of the Month	5	May 1993, June 1994, July 1994, May 1996, July 2001	
National League Player of the Week	6	May 23, 1993; June 19, 1994; June 26, 1994; July 24, 1994; April 27, 1997; August 13, 2000	
National League Rookie of the Year	1	1991	
Players Choice Award for National League Outstanding Player	1	1994	
Rawlings Gold Glove Award at first base	1	1994	
Silver Slugger Award at first base	3	1994, 1997, 1999	
Sporting News Major League Player of the Year	1	1994	
Sporting News Rookie of the Year	1	1991	

=== Statistical achievements ===
League leader board appearances
Category	NL leader		NL top ten		Career total	MLB rank while active^{β}
Category	×	Seasons	×	Seasons	Career total	MLB rank while active^{β}
Batting average^{†}			3	1993, 1994, 1996	.297	9th
Bases on balls	1	1999	12	1991, 1992, 1994–2002, 2004	1,401	3rd
Double plays grounded into			7	1992–94, 1999–2001, 2003	221	3rd
Doubles	1	1996	5	1993, 1994, 1996, 1997, 2001	488	3rd
Extra base hits	1	1994	6	1994, 1996, 1997, 1999–2001	969	3rd
Games played	4	1992, 1996, 1997, 1999	9	1991, 1992, 1996, 1997, 1999–2003	2,150	5th
Hit by pitch	1	1991	7	1991, 1992, 1996, 1997, 1999, 2000, 2002	128	9th
Hits			1	1994	2,314	3rd
Home runs			7	1994, 1997–2001, 2003	449	5th
Intentional bases on balls			7	1992, 1994–97, 1999, 2000	155	6th
On-base percentage^{†}			8	1991, 1994–2000	.408	5th
On-base plus slugging^{†}	1	1994	7	1993, 1994, 1996–2000	.948	6th
Runs batted in	1	1994	7	1992, 1994, 1996, 1997, 1999–2001	1,529	2nd
Runs scored	3	1994, 1999, 2000	8	1992, 1994, 1997–2001, 2003	1,517	3rd
Sacrifice flies	1	1992	6	1992–1995, 1997, 2002	102	2nd
Slugging percentage^{†}	1	1994	6	1993, 1994, 1996, 1997, 1999, 2000	.540	6th
Strikeouts			2	1991, 1997	1,558	3rd
Total bases	1	1994	7	1994, 1996, 1997, 1999–2001, 2003	4,213	4th
Per Baseball Reference.^{†} — Rate statistics for individual seasons based on 3.2 plate appearances per game. β — For the time period 1991–2005. Rate statistics based on 7,500 plate appearances, or 500 plate appearances per season.

Houston Astros leader board appearances
Category	Single-season record		Single-season top 10		Career total	Astros rank
Category	Total	Season	×	Seasons	Career total	Astros rank
Batting average	.368	1994			.297	3rd–t
Bases on balls	149	1999	4	1996 (135), 1997, 1998, 2000	1,401	1st
Double plays grounded into			1	2003 (25)	221	1st
Doubles			1	1996 (48)	488	2nd
Extra base hits			5	2001 (86), 1997, 2000, 1996, 1999	969	2nd
Games played	162–t	1992, 1996, 1997, 1999			2,150	2nd
Hit by pitch			1	1997 (16)	128	2nd
Hits					2,314	2nd
Home runs	47	2000	5	1997 (43), 1999, 1994, 2001, 2003	449	1st
Intentional bases on balls	27	1997	1	1996 (20)	155	1st
On-base percentage	.454	1999	5	1996, 1994 (2× .451), 1997, 1998, 2000	.408	2nd
On-base plus slugging	1.201	1994	4	1999 (1.045), 2000, 1996, 1997	.948	3rd
Runs batted in			5	1997 (135), 2000, 2001, 1999, 1996	1,529	1st
Runs scored	152	2000	3	1999 (143), 2001, 1998	1,517	2nd
Sacrifice flies	13–t	1992	1	1994 (10)	102	1st
Slugging percentage	.750	1994	3	2000 (.615), 1997, 1999	.540	3rd
Stolen bases					202	6th
Strikeouts			1	2001 (135)	1,558	2nd
Total bases	363	2000	3	2001 (341), 1997, 1999	4,213	2nd
Wins Above Replacement			4	1994 (8.2), 1997, 1996, 1999	79.6	1st

=== Various accomplishments ===
Other distinctions
Event	x	Duration	Total	Date(s)	Refs
MLB record streak of 30 home runs, 100 RBI, 100 runs scored, and 100 walks in a season		6 seasons		1996–2001
One of 12 players in MLB history to hit 400 home runs with a .400 OBP		Career
Only first baseman in MLB history to achieve 400 home runs and 200 stolen bases		Career
National League for record runs scored		2 seasons	295	1999–2000
MLB record for doubles	1	1 game	4	June 14, 1996
MLB record for bases on balls	1	1 game	6	August 20, 1999
Houston Astros' record for home runs		1 month	13	June 1994
Astrodome record for home runs		1 season	23	1994
30–30 club member	2	1 season		1997, 1999
Hit for the cycle	1	1 game		July 18, 2001
3 home runs in a game	3	1 game		June 24, 1994; April 21, 1999; June 9, 1999

== Personal life ==
Since his playing career ended, Bagwell has spent much of his time with his family while sporadically taking coaching and special assignment positions for the Astros. He is married to Rachel Bagwell, his third wife, with whom he has five children in a blended family. Rachel had three children prior to meeting Jeff. Before his marriage to Rachel, Jeff had two daughters, Blake and Bryce. Bagwell married his first wife, model Shaune Bagwell (née Stauffer), in 1992. He later married Ericka Bagwell, with whom he had his two daughters. Rachel Bagwell was the widow of Greater Houston-area hand surgeon Dr. Michael Brown, the owner and founder of Brown Hand Center.

In spite of his professional success, Bagwell has stated that he "doesn't enjoy too much of the spotlight" that follows. While giving a tribute to him during the retirement ceremony of his uniform number, longtime friend and former teammate Brad Ausmus noted several little-known facts. "He liked soccer as much as ... baseball" while growing up in Connecticut. He hit three fewer home runs than his boyhood idol, Carl Yastrzemski, who hit 452. "His baseball card says he's six feet tall. He's closer to 5' 10"." Both Bagwell and Ausmus hit 32 triples in their careers. After his playing career, Bagwell was seen with significantly longer hair. Remarked Ausmus, "I want to confirm he does not have hair extensions."

In January 2015, Bagwell reportedly sold his home in the Memorial neighborhood of Houston.

Darryl Kile, a former teammate with the Astros, died of a heart attack on June 22, 2002, while an active player for the Cardinals, before a game against the Cubs. The Darryl Kile Good Guy Award was established in his honor, annually for one player on both the Cardinals and the Astros. Bagwell was the first recipient for the Astros in 2003. Ken Caminiti, another former teammate of Bagwell's, died on October 10, 2004. Bagwell delivered a eulogy at his funeral.

Bagwell is a recovering alcoholic. He struggled with addiction for several years until 2017.

== See also ==
- 30–30 club
- Houston Astros award winners and league leaders
- List of Houston Astros team records
- List of Major League Baseball annual doubles leaders
- List of Major League Baseball annual runs batted in leaders
- List of Major League Baseball annual runs scored leaders
- List of Major League Baseball career bases on balls leaders
- List of Major League Baseball career doubles leaders
- List of Major League Baseball career extra base hits leaders
- List of Major League Baseball career hit by pitch leaders
- List of Major League Baseball career hits leaders
- List of Major League Baseball career home run leaders
- List of Major League Baseball career on-base percentage leaders
- List of Major League Baseball career OPS leaders
- List of Major League Baseball career putouts leaders
- List of Major League Baseball career runs batted in leaders
- List of Major League Baseball career runs scored leaders
- List of Major League Baseball career slugging percentage leaders
- List of Major League Baseball career strikeouts by batters leaders
- List of Major League Baseball career total bases leaders
- List of Major League Baseball home run records
- List of Major League Baseball players to hit for the cycle
- List of Major League Baseball players who spent their entire career with one franchise
- List of Major League Baseball retired numbers

Sporting positions
Preceded by Mike Barnett	Houston Astros hitting coach 2010	Succeeded by Sean Berry
Achievements
Preceded by John Olerud	Hitting for the cycle July 18, 2001	Succeeded by Jeff Frye
