= Max M. Axelrod =

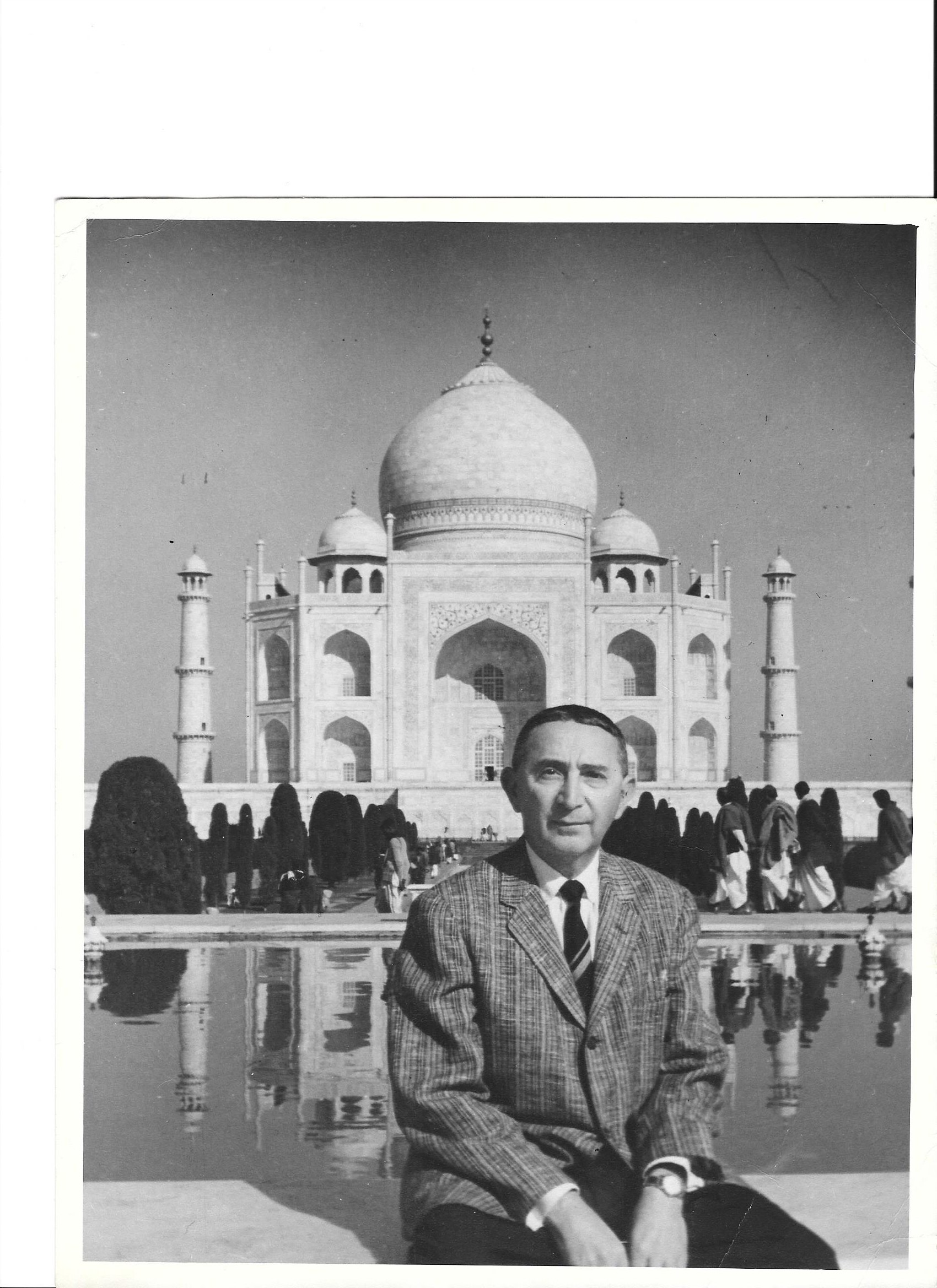
- Max M. Axelrod
- Born: February 22, 1911; Cleveland, Ohio
- Died: March 30, 2004 (aged 93); Beachwood, Ohio
- Occupation: Sports Concessions
- Children: Lisa M. Axelrod
- Parent(s): Peter and Mary Axelrod

Max M. Axelrod (February 22, 1911 – March 30, 2004) was a businessman, sports pioneer, and social welfare activist from Cleveland, Ohio. He is known for founding the Cleveland Jewish News and Lake Forest Country Club and his charitable work with the Jewish Welfare Fund Appeal, Cleveland State University and the United Negro College Fund.

== Early life ==
Axelrod was born in Cleveland, Ohio in 1911 to Russian immigrants Peter and Mary Axelrod. Peter Axelrod founded The Cleveland Dairy, as farming and the production of kefir was the family business in Russia. His great uncle was Russian Menshevik revolutionary Pavel Borisovich Axelrod, the founder of Pravda, the official newspaper of Russia.

Max Axelrod graduated from Western Reserve University during the Great Depression with degrees in mathematics and law. Axelrod served in WWII with the U.S. Army in Eritrea, Somalia and throughout the Middle East, as both a lawyer and an intelligence officer for the US government.

== Career ==
Axelrod founded The Cleveland Concession Co. in 1929 and held concession contracts with venues such as The Cleveland Municipal Stadium, The Cleveland Arena, The Cleveland Convention Center, Old League Park, The Public Auditorium and the Akron Rubber Bowl. He also served concessions at special community events, such as the Great Lakes Exposition in 1937.

For three years, Axelrod was chairman of the Cleveland Boxing Commission and ran the Cleveland Arena. He was an avid supporter of young African-American boxers and legitimized the sport by moving it from underground, Mafia-run warehouses to the Cleveland Arena. The most notable of these boxing matches was Jake LaMotta vs. Laurent Dauthuille in 1950. The fight was profiled in the 1980 film Raging Bull.

He bought several delicatessens in Cleveland, most famously the New Yorker Deli on Chester Avenue.

In the 1960s, Axelrod partnered with New York Yankees owner George Steinbrenner in an attempt to buy the Cleveland Browns. The pair also worked together to restart the Cleveland Air Show in 1964.

Axelrod founded and later served as president of Lake Forest Country Club in Hudson, Ohio. Prior to WWII, country clubs didn't allow Jews or African-Americans to join, so Axelrod created his own that did not discriminate in employment or membership.

=== Jewish Community activism ===
In the late 1950s Axelrod began his social welfare and charitable work in the Cleveland area.

He became a lifelong trustee of the Jewish Federation of Cleveland. In 1972 he headed the Jewish Welfare Fund Appeal, helping to raise millions and making numerous trips to Israel to serve on the board of the National Conference of Christians and Jews. Together with Lloyd Schwenger and several other Cleveland community leaders, Axelrod founded the Cleveland Jewish News in 1964 and served as the paper's first president. Max is listed as "President Emeritus" in the papers history.

== Legacy ==
Following his death in 2004, Axelrod's daughter Lisa Axelrod fulfilled his wishes by scattering his ashes below what was remaining of the wall of Old League Park in a private ceremony. Max wanted his final resting place to be where his business and love of the game first started. The City of Cleveland reopened the Old League Park to the public on August 23, 2014 as the Baseball Heritage Museum and Fannie Lewis Community Park at League Park. It features murals of the great Cleveland League and Negro league players who worked with Axelrod.
