= Jayant Kumar Banthia =

Indian public servant

Chief Secretary of Maharashtra
- In office 31 May 2012 – 30 November 2015
- Preceded by: Ratnakar Gaikwad
- Succeeded by: JS Saharia

Personal details
- Born: 1 June 1952 (age 74) Kolkata, India
- Education: M.Sc Demography M.Sc Chemistry
- Alma mater: London School of Economics; Kanpur University

Jayant Kumar Banthia (born 1 June 1952) is an Indian public servant who served as the Chief Secretary of Maharashtra from 31 May 2012 to 30 November 2013. His prior assignment was as the Additional Chief Secretary in the Public Health Department, Government of Maharashtra.

Banthia also served in United Nation Population Fund (UNFPA), on deputation for four years, as Chief Technical Adviser to Nigerian Census. He was the Registrar General and Census Commissioner of India from 1999 to 2004 and the 2001 Census was rolled out under his command. During his initial stint in the IAS, he worked as Assistant Collector, Osmanabad and Beed, Chief Executive Officer Z.P. Wardha, Collector Nagpur and Bhandara, and Managing Director, Maharashtra State Textile Corporation.

== Career ==
After his initial postings as chief executive officer of a Zilla Parishad, Banthia was appointed collector, Bhandara. After a three-year stint, he took up a central deputation post as director of census operations under the ministry of home affairs, where he was promoted as registrar general and census commissioner and held the post till May 2005. In June 2005, he was appointed the chief technical advisor with the United Nations population fund. On 6 January 2010, he returned to the state government and was appointed commissioner, family welfare. Last year, he was promoted as additional chief secretary (public health).

An IAS officer of the 1977 Batch, Banthia started out as Assistant Collector, Osmanabad and Beed, followed by becoming the CEO of Zilla Parishad Wardha, and then Collector, Bhandara. Thereafter he was appointed as Director of Census Operations, under central government deputation. There he was promoted as the Registrar General and Census Commissioner of India. Later he took a deputation assignment with the United Nations to work as Chief Technical Advisor stationed in Nigeria. He joined the Maharashtra state government services again in 2010, as commissioner, family welfare. A year later, he was promoted as Additional Chief Secretary Public Health.

During his tenure as the Chief Secretary, Banthia activated the Mumbai First group, a PPP involving the leading Corporates of Mumbai and the Govt. of Maharashtra / Govt. of India officials, for revival/ pushing through several innovative infra-structure projects of water ways, Metro and Mono Rail, New Railway Stations, resolution of pending infrastructure projects, etc.

== Post-retirement ==
Banthia was a part of the Mumbai Metro fare fixation committee, formed to resolve a dispute over metro fare between the government and its private partner in the project - MMOPL. Other members of the committee included Retired Justice E Padmanabhan and former law secretary T K Vishwanathan. While the other two members supported price hike, Banthia issued a dissent note, citing the following: "...the existing rules to guide the FFC to enable it to fix the fare... have not been clearly spelt out so far, specially for a PPP project. This has proved to be a major challenge and constraint for the FFC. It is suggested that this aspect be dealt (with) by Government of India, at the earliest, specially for PPP metro projects, since affordability and reasonability of fare structure will be the essence for the common public at large (sic)," "The very applicability of the provisions of Fare Fixation in this case did not arise, since it was a PPP project, whose pre-bid parameters were already decided and frozen in terms of fare structure and service levels… This action, however, does not alter the BASIC and FUNDAMENTAL NATURE of the PARAMETERS, which were conditions precedent to the bidding process and inherent part of the bid document for the proposed execution of the Mumbai Metro Project. (sic)."

The price hike was later on felled by the Bombay High Court, leading to a challenge to the judgement in the Supreme Court by MMOPL. However, the Supreme Court referred the matter back to the High Court for taking it up for final hearing.

Shri Jayant Kumar Banthia is also a member of Governing Council at the prestigious Tata Memorial Centre, a grant in aid institution under the Administrative control of Department of Atomic Energy, GOI. Reference: https://tmc.gov.in/index.php/en/aboutus/governing-council

== Publications ==
Journal Article: Smallpox in Nineteenth-Century India. Dec 1999. Published by: Population Council
