= Édouard Axelrad =

French writer

Édouard Axelrad (10 June 1918 – 2006) was a French writer.

== Biography ==
Axelrad was born in Paris in June 1918. During the Holocaust, Axelrad was detained at Auschwitz because of his Jewish heritage. Due to his talent as painter, a Nazi official spared his life. Axelrad was held at the Sachsenhausen concentration camp until the end of World War II, as he detailed in his 1988 book Le Jaune. Axelrad died in 2006.

== Works ==
- L'Arche ensevelie, 1959
- La Terre de la gazelle
- Marie Casse-croûte, 1985, Prix RTL grand public 1985
- Le Jaune, 1988
- La cavale irlandaise, 1991
- Au Fil du fleuve, 1994
