= Gan-ya Ben-gur Akselrod =

American singer and opera singer

- גַּן-יָה בֶּן-גּוּר אֲקְסָלְרוֹד
- Born: May 25, 1987 (age 39); Tel Aviv, Israel
- Education: Buchmann-Mehta School of Music; Brooklyn Conservatory of Music
- Occupation: Opera singer (soprano)
- Years active: 2009–present
- Employer: University of Music and Performing Arts Graz
- Notable work: The World of Hans Zimmer tour
- Awards: Hilde Zadek Singing Competition (2013); Lotte Lenya Competition (2018, 2021)

Gan-ya Ben-gur Akselrod (hebrew: גַּן-יָה בֶּן-גּוּר אֲקְסָלְרוֹד Gan-Yah Ben-Gūr Axelrōd; born May 25, 1987) is an American-Israeli opera singer (soprano).

== Life and career ==
Gan-ya Ben-gur Akselrod was born in Tel Aviv. She began her musical education with playing cello, piano, and clarinet. She studied at the Buchmann-Mehta School of Music in Israel and at the Brooklyn Conservatory of Music in New York City.

In the U.S., she appeared at Opera Moderne in New York and the Crested Butte Music Festival in Colorado. In 2009, she won the first prize of the Buchman-Mehta Singer's Competition in Tel Aviv. She made her debut at New York's Carnegie Hall in 2010, in 2011 she made her European debut at the Festival d'Aix-en-Provence. She performed in Weingartner's Die Dorfschule at the Deutsche Oper Berlin in 2011. In 2013, she won the Hilde Zadek Singing Competition in Vienna, after which she was accepted into the Young Ensemble of the Theater an der Wien, where she was a member for two years starting in the 2013/14 season. As part of this engagement, she performed as Clorinda in Rossini's La Cenerentola, Tamiri in Handel's Semiramide under the baton of Alan Curtis, and Almirena in Rinaldo conducted by Rubén Dubrovsky. She also appeared as Servilia in Mozart's La clemenza di Tito, Thérèse/Tirésias in Poulenc's Les mamelles de Tirésias, and in two song recitals at the Wiener Kammeroper. At the Theater an der Wien, she played Barbarina in Mozart's Le nozze di Figaro under Marc Minkowski, Lucy in Brecht and Weill's Die Dreigroschenoper, directed by Keith Warner and conducted by Johannes Kalitzke, as well as Thalie in Rameau's Platée, directed by Robert Carsen.

Further guest performances brought Gan-ya to the Händel Festival in Halle, the Barocktage Stift Melk with Monteverdi's Il combattimento di Tancredi e Clorinda, the Théâtre du Capitole in Toulouse as Elvira in Rossini's L'italiana in Algeri, the Oldenburg State Theater as Clorinda in La Cenerentola, and the Glyndebourne Festival as a jump in for Blondchen in Mozart's Die Entführung aus dem Serail. She also performed as Konstanze in Die Entführung aus dem Serail at the Israeli Opera. At the Komische Oper Berlin, she sang Olympia in Offenbach's Les Contes d'Hoffmann in 2022, directed by Barrie Kosky. In contemporary opera, she appeared in the world premiere of Panisello's Le Malentendu at Neue Oper Wien and Teatros del Canal in Madrid (2017), as Madame Mao Tse-tung in Adams Nixon in China at the Stuttgart State Opera (2019), and as Nurit in Maor's The Sleeping Thousand at the Festival d'Aix-en-Provence. In 2022, she participated in the innovative Civic Opera Creations project in Vienna, and in 2023, she made her debut at the Bregenz Festival in the world premiere of Panisello's Die Judith von Shimoda. She regularly performs in concert at the Israeli Opera and has appeared at the Grafenegg Festival, the Wiener Konzerthaus, with the NDR Radiophilharmonie, the hr-Sinfonieorchester, and most recently with the SWR Experimentalstudio at the Ultraschall Festival in Berlin.

Since 2017, Gan-ya has been a soprano soloist in The World of Hans Zimmer tour, created by film composer Hans Zimmer. As part of this global concert series, she has performed in over 80 concerts at some of the world's largest arenas and stadiums, including the O2 Arena in London, the Olympiahalle in Munich, the Lanxess Arena in Cologne, the Arena de Genève in Geneva, the VTB Arena in Moscow, the Ice Palace in Saint Petersburg, the Mercedes-Benz Arena in Berlin, the Accor Arena in Paris, and the Ziggo Dome in Amsterdam.

Her repertoire includes, in addition to the previously mentioned roles, Despina in Mozart's Così fan tutte, Zerlina in Don Giovanni, Belinda and Second Woman in Purcell's Dido and Aeneas, Euridice and Amore in Gluck's Orfeo ed Euridice, Rosina in Paisiello's Il barbiere di Siviglia, Nanetta in Verdi's Falstaff, Gilda in Rigoletto, the title role in Massenet's Thaïs, Micaëla in Bizet's Carmen, La Princesse and La Chauve-Souris in Ravel's L'enfant et les sortilèges, Bubikopf in Ullmann's Der Kaiser von Atlantis, Marfa in Rimsky-Korsakov's The Tsar's Bride, and Jenny in Weill's Rise and Fall of the City of Mahagonny.

In the field of sacred music, her repertoire includes the roles of the Boy and the Angel in Mendelssohn's oratorio Elijah, as well as the soprano parts in Pergolesi's Stabat Mater, Vivaldi's Gloria and Magnificat, Fauré's Requiem, Schubert's Mass in C Major, and Mozart's Coronation Mass and Vesperae solennes de confessore.

Alongside her singing career, Gan-ya is a professor in the Master's program Performance Practice in Contemporary Music (PPCM Vocal) at the University of Music and Performing Arts Graz. Her teaching philosophy is based on the belief that contemporary music transcends temporal boundaries and integrates into all aspects of musicianship, performance, and personal development.

She has won several awards in the United States, Israel, and Austria.

== Awards and competitions ==
Akselrod won prizes at competitions in the U.S., Turkey, Israel and Austria:

- 2021 Lotte Lenya Competition, New York City, third prize
- 2020 Kurt Weill Foundation for Music, New York City, Trustees' Award
- 2019 Global Music Awards, California, Silver Medalist
- 2018 Lotte-Lenya-Wettbewerb, Lys-Simonette-Preis
- 2015 International competition of the Güzin Gürel Arts & Science Foundation, Istanbul, second prize
- 2013 Internationaler Hilde-Zadek-Gesangswettbewerb, Vienna, first prize
- 2009 Buchman-Mehta singing competition, Tel Aviv, first prize.
