= Abraham of Cologne =

Abraham of Cologne (also known as Abraham ben Alexander or Axelrad; fl. c. 1240) was a German rabbi and early Kabbalist. He is recognized as one of the most prominent disciples of Eleazar of Worms, a leading figure of the Hasidei Ashkenaz movement in medieval Germany.

== Life ==
Abraham was active in the mid-13th century and is noted for his deep involvement in Jewish mysticism. According to Solomon ben Adret (Responsa, i, no. 548), Abraham visited the court of the King of Castile—likely Ferdinand III—under the alias "Nathan" to conceal his identity. Adret also recounts that Abraham once preached on Numbers 7:1 in the home of Adret's father, delivering a sermon before a gathering of distinguished rabbis, where he demonstrated considerable erudition.

== Works ==
Abraham is the attributed author of a mystical treatise titled Keter Shem Tov (The Crown of a Good Name). The work explores the nature of the Sefirot, the ten emanations in Kabbalistic cosmology. Some manuscripts attribute the final chapter—focused on the Sefirot—to Menahem Ashkenazi, another student of Eleazar of Worms. The text represents an early attempt to synthesize the mystical traditions of the German pietists with the emerging Kabbalistic doctrines from Provence and Spain.

Keter Shem Tov was first published in Amsterdam in 1810 and also appeared under the title Ma'amar Peloni Almoni in the 1798 collection Likkutim me-Rav Hai Gaon. In some manuscripts, the work is titled Ma'amar be-Kabbalah Nevu'it (Treatise on Prophetic Kabbalah), indicating its influence on later developments in prophetic Kabbalah, particularly in Barcelona.

== Legacy ==
Abraham of Cologne is considered one of the earliest Ashkenazi figures to engage deeply with the concept of the Sefirot, marking a significant moment in the transmission of mystical ideas from Ashkenaz to the Iberian Peninsula. His work helped bridge the pietistic mysticism of Germany with the speculative Kabbalah that would flourish in Spain.

== Name and Identity ==
In some sources, Abraham refers to his father as "Achseldar" or "Achselrad," though this may be a scribal error or variant spelling.
