= Barry Axelrod =

American sports agent and lawyer (1946–2024)

- Born: Barry Evan Axelrod; August 21, 1946; Burbank, California, U.S.
- Died: May 9, 2024 (aged 77); Encinitas, California, U.S.
- Education: University of California, Los Angeles (AB, JD)
- Occupations: lawyer, agent

Barry Evan Axelrod (August 21, 1946 – May 9, 2024) was an American sports agent and lawyer who specialized in sports, entertainment and business law.

== Early life ==
Barry Evan Axelrod was born on August 21, 1946, in Burbank, California. He graduated from the University of California, Los Angeles (UCLA) with a Bachelor of Arts in History in 1968 and from UCLA School of Law with a Juris Doctor in 1971.

While attending UCLA, he spent more than five years working part-time for a sports team physician, making friendships with many sports athletes who moved on to professional careers.

== Legal career ==
Axelrod spent three years in the general practice of law in a small firm, before he joined the firm of Steinberg & Demoff as a partner and helped create the firm's Sports and Entertainment practice. Within two years, the firm represented approximately 100 athletes in the National Football League, National Basketball Association, Major League Baseball, Women's Tennis Association, women's golf, auto racing, and rodeo.

Axelrod left the firm in 1978 and became a sole practitioner with a focus on Sports and Entertainment Law. He began operating his own law firm in Encinitas, California in 1979. He was a member of the Sports Lawyers Association and taught Sports Law at Pepperdine University Law School in 1994 to 1995.

=== Notable clients ===
Axelrod's first client was his UCLA roommate, Mark Harmon. He also represented Harmon's wife, Pam Dawber. Axelrod also represented Jake Peavy, Jeff Bagwell, Craig Biggio, Matt Morris, Matt Clement, Phil Nevin, as well as former San Diego Padres and Arizona Diamondbacks general manager Kevin Towers, broadcasters Rick Sutcliffe, Mark Grace and Wally Joyner, and professional figure skater Michelle Kwan.

== Other activities ==
Axelrod served on the board of directors of the United States Anti-Doping Agency from 2000 to 2011.

== Death ==
Axelrod died at his home in Encinitas, California, on May 9, 2024, at the age of 77.
