= Donald Axelrod =

American academic and author

- Born: January 15, 1916
- Died: March 15, 1999 (aged 83); Slingerlands, New York, U.S.
- Title: Professor
- Spouse: Selma Sachs (m. 19??-1999; his death)
- Children: 2

Donald Axelrod (January 15, 1916 – March 16, 1999) was Professor Emeritus and former chairman of the Department of Public Administration & Policy at the University at Albany (SUNYA). Axelrod also served as director of the Public Enterprise Project of the Rockefeller Institute of Government.

== Career ==
Axelrod retired in 1971 from the New York State Office of the Budget as assistant state budget director after a 26-year career in public administration. He also served as a consultant to several foreign governments, including Turkey and Thailand, and was the author of several books, including Budgeting for Modern Government and Shadow Government: The Hidden World of Public Authorities. He was a member of the American Society of Public Administration.

== Death ==
Axelrod died on March 16, 1999, at his home in Slingerlands, New York, after a long battle with cancer, aged 83. His immediate survivors were his wife, Selma (née Sachs; November 4, 1916 — January 9, 2009) and two children.
