= Ari Axelrod =

American singer and actor

Ari Axelrod is an American singer and actor who is known for his one-man musical show “A Place For Us: A Celebration of Jewish Broadway".

== Early life and education ==
Axelrod grew up in Ann Arbor, Michigan. His great-grandfather, a cantor, had a brother who was an opera singer before his murder in Kyiv by the Nazis. Axelrod graduated from Webster University’s Conservatory of Theatre Arts.

== Career ==
Axelrod's one-man show "Taking the Wheel" was directed by Faith Prince. He performed off-Broadway in "Milk and Honey" at the York Theatre. Axelrod's one-man show "A Place for Us: A Celebration of Jewish Broadway" debuted at the Birdland Jazz Club in 2019. In the show, Axelrod tells stories about the composers whose music he sings, including Leonard Bernstein, Stephen Sondheim, Richard Rodgers and Oscar Hammerstein. He explains how some portions of the songs were taken from Hebrew liturgy. For example, he says "God Bless America" was taken from the Amidah.

Axelrod's show "Self Portrait" was directed by Jeff Harnar. After playing five roles in "Fiddler on the Roof" in one year, Axelrod began writing a new show about that experience, tentatively called “My Year in Anatevka.”

== Awards ==
- Bistro Award for Cabaret, Jazz and Comedy Artists, 2019
- Best Male Vocalist nominee, Manhattan Association of Cabarets 2020

== Activism ==
Axelrod was named one of The Jewish Week’s "36 Under 36" in 2021. During pandemic theater shutdowns, he began posting on social media about Holocaust awareness and against antisemitism. He declared his goal of giving "voice to the voiceless", noting that Jews in 20th century American musical theater felt like outsiders despite their major contributions.

After the October 7 attacks and Broadway's tribute to Israel's hostages, Axelrod incorporated "Bring Him Home" into his show "A Place for Us". Some Jews told him his show had "given them more confidence to live Jewishly". Axelrod's approach to his activism includes not only fighting against antisemitism, but "fighting for Jewish vitality". When one audience member interrupted to demand that Axelrod consider suffering "in all parts of the world", Axelrod was reportedly open to the shout-out and respectfully agreed.

== Personal life ==
Axelrod had brain surgery during college.
