= Beth Axelrod =

American-born human resources leader

- Born: Elizabeth Axelrod
- Education: Wharton School - University of Pennsylvania; Yale School of Management
- Occupations: Businesswoman; advisor
- Title: Vice President of Employee Experience at Airbnb

Beth Axelrod is an American human resources leader. She is currently an advisor at the Clayman Institute for Gender Research at Stanford University. From 2017 to 2021, she was the Vice President of Employee Experience at Airbnb. Previous to that, she was Senior Vice President of human resources at eBay from 2005 to 2015. Axelrod is a member of several corporate boards and academic advisory councils, including Heidrick & Struggles and the Jay H. Baker Retailing Center at the Wharton School of the University of Pennsylvania. She was formerly an advisory board member of Bulger Partners, YaleWomen, and UC Berkeley Executive Education.

== Education ==
Axelrod received a BSE degree from Wharton School of the University of Pennsylvania. She has a master's in public and private management (MPPM) from the Yale School of Management.

== Career ==
Axelrod started working at McKinsey & Company in 1989. In 2002, she was hired as the Chief Talent Officer for WPP. At WPP, she helped devise better ways to recruit and retain talented people for the company. In 2005, she was hired as the Senior Vice President of human resources at eBay. She retired from eBay in 2015 after the spin-off of PayPal and became the Vice President of Employee Experience at Airbnb in 2017.

As of 2020, Beth is Vice President of Employee Experience at Airbnb, a vacation rental home website. She heads hiring to office environment to maintaining the employee benefits that Airbnb provides.

== Publications ==
The War For Talent is a book written in 2001 by Axelrod, Ed Michaels, and Helen Handfield-Jones. The book was based on the term 'war for talent' that was first coined at McKinsey & Co.

== Politics ==
During the 2022 midterm election cycle, Axelrod donated to The Next 50, a Democratic political action committee.
