= Shaune Bagwell =

American-born fashion model and actress

Shaune Stauffer
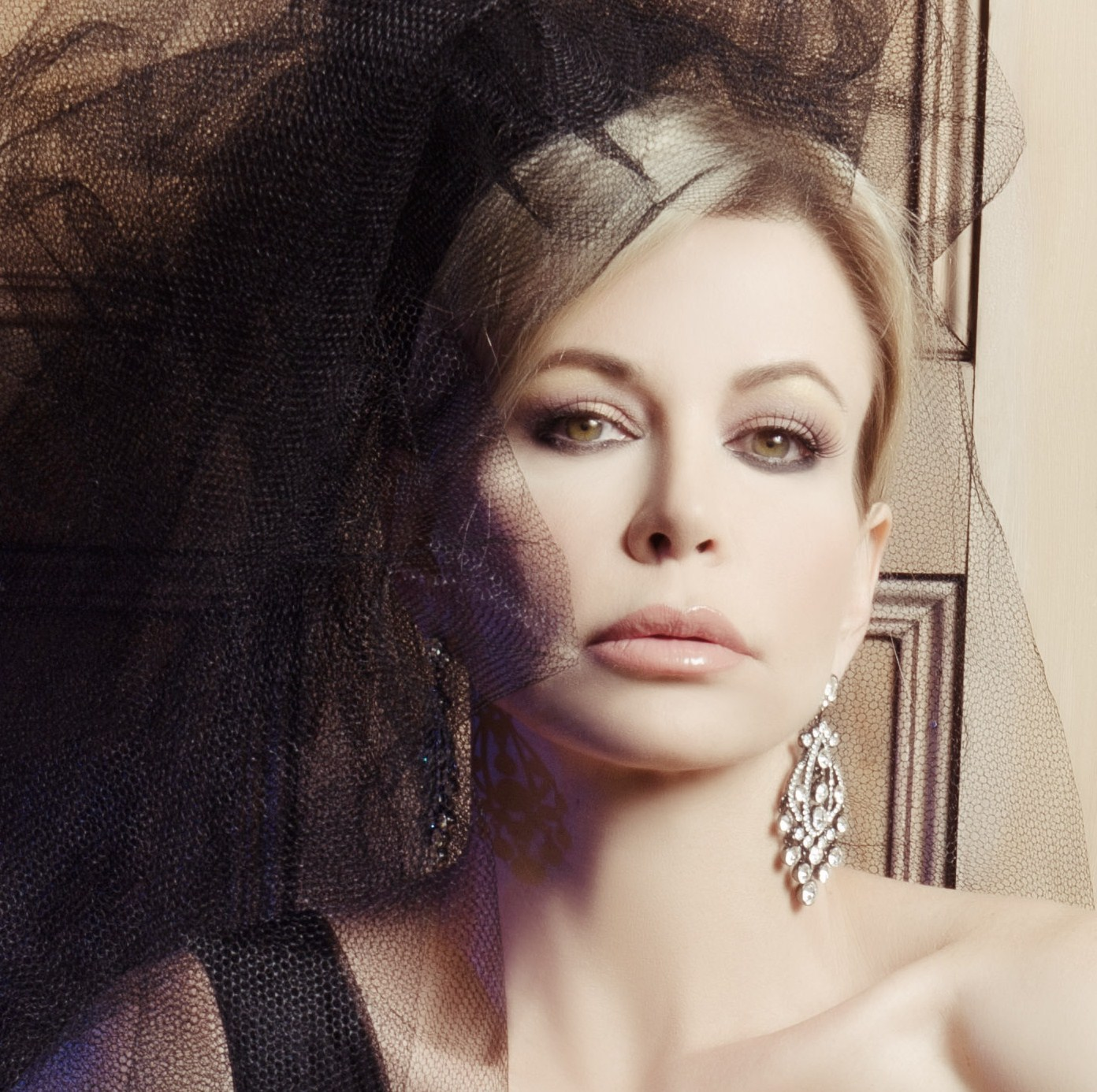
- Born: Shaune Stauffer; Houston, Texas, USA
- Occupation: Model

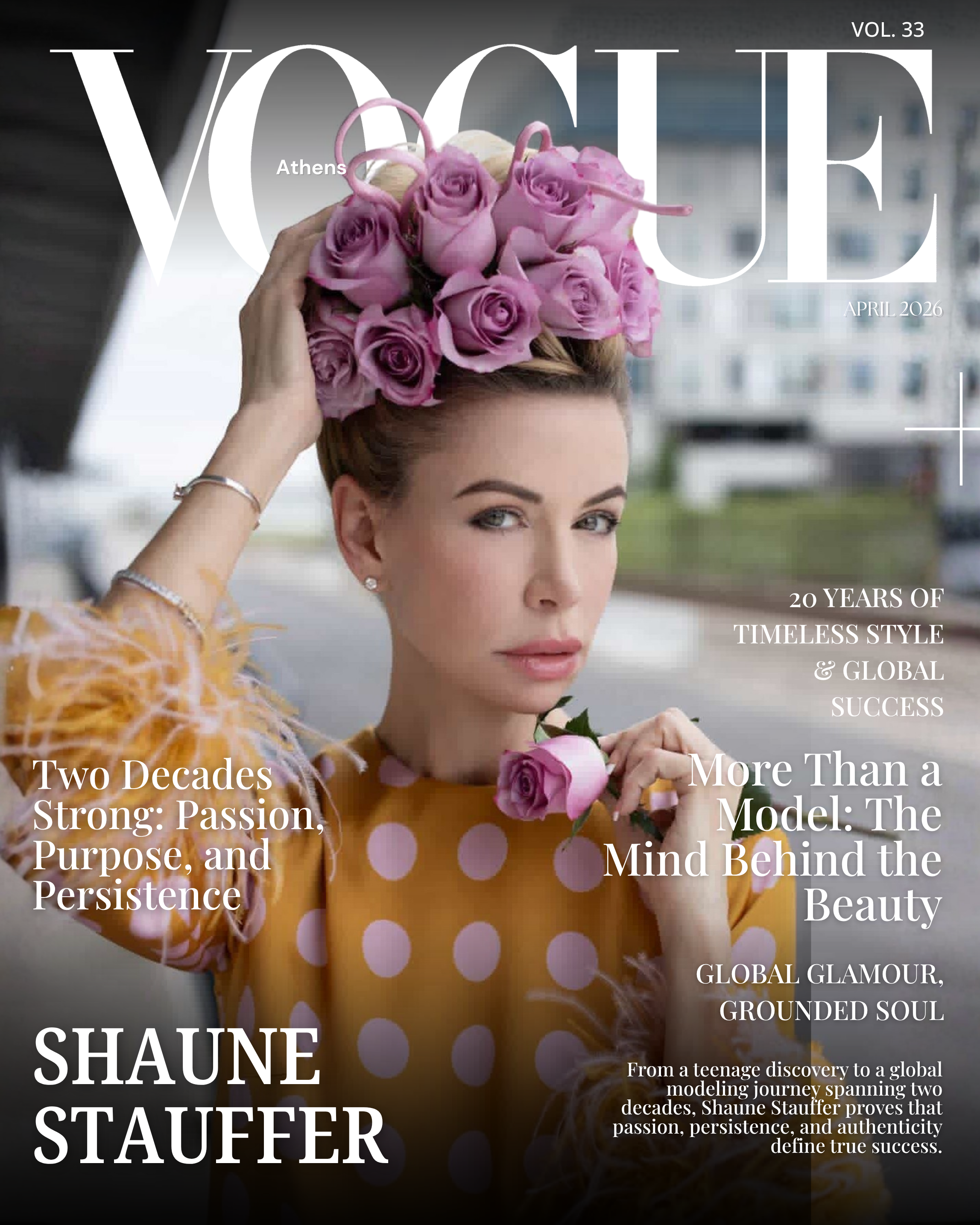
Shaune Stauffer in Antonio Melani for Vogue magazine

Shaune Stauffer (born November 18, 1993) is an American high fashion runway model, beauty queen, and style influencer. She has modeled for various fashion designers including Oscar de la Renta, Marc Jacobs, Gucci, Victoria's Secret, Christian Lacroix, Isaac Mizrahi, Calvin Klein, Richard Tyler, Michael Lombard and Guess. She walked in New York Fashion Week for Negris Lebrum’s autumn-winter and spring-summer 2022, 2023 and 2024 collections, Theophilio autumn-winter 2023 and 2024, an Oscar De la Renta autumn–winter 2026.

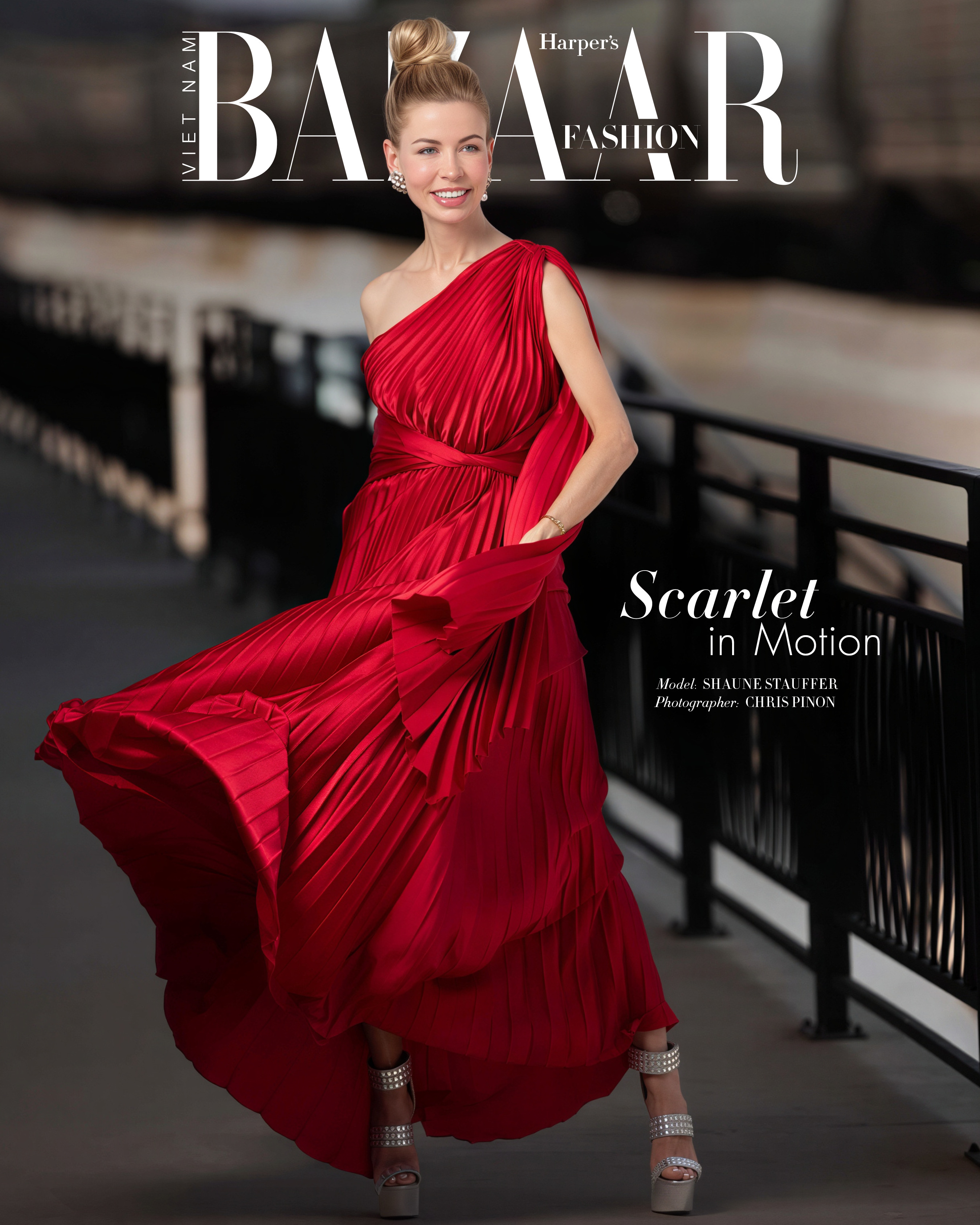
Shaune Stauffer models Dior for Harper's Bazaar

In July 2017, Stauffer represented Texas at the Galaxy International Pageant in Orlando, Florida; in 2018, she was crowned Ms. United States Galaxy. Bagwell also represented Texas in the 2019 Ms. United States Pageant placing in the top 10.

Stauffer is also an actress who appeared in several films and the popular television soap opera, Days of Our Lives.

== Filmography ==
Year	Title	Role	Notes
1986	Vasectomy: A Delicate Manner	Beauty Pageant Contestant	
1998	Extreme Gong	Co-Host	
1998	October 22	Bridesmaid	Uncredited
1999	Can't Stop Dancing	Erika	
1999	The Sex Monster	Woman on Street	
2002	The Contract	Betty the Secretary	
2002	Days of Our Lives	Meg	Episode: #9277
2002	Opportunity Knocks	Co-Host	
2002	Rough Crossing	Sonya Bennet	
