= Paul Axelrod =

Canadian academic

- Born: Paul Douglas Axelrod; December 11, 1949 (age 76)
- Education: York University
- Years active: 1982—present

Academic work
- Discipline: History, Politics
- Sub-discipline: History of education, Politics in education

Paul Douglas Axelrod (born 11 December 1949) is a Professor Emeritus, Faculty of Education at York University, of which he was dean from 2001 to 2008. He has written widely on the history and political economy of schooling and higher education.

== Early life and education ==
Born in London, Ontario, he received a B.A. in history and political science from York University in 1972, an M.A. in History from the University of Toronto in 1973, and a doctorate in history from York in 1980.

== Career ==
Before arriving at York in 1982, he taught at Queen's University. At York, he became an associate professor in 1987, and then a full professor in 1994. Axelrod was Chair of the Division of Social Science from 1989 to 1993, and then the Dean of the Faculty of Education from 2001 to 2008. He retired in 2015.

== Awards ==
He has received numerous honours, including the "Distinguished Contribution Award" from the Canadian History of Education Association (2016), the "David C. Smith Award" from the Council of Ontario Universities (2007), the Distinguished Research Award from the Canadian Society for the Study of Higher Education (1992), the Certificate of Merit from the Canadian Association of Foundations of Education (1999), and the Founders Prize from the Canadian History of Education Association (1990, 1996).

== Bibliography ==
=== Books ===
- Axelrod, P., Desai Trilokekar, R.D., Shanahan, T., Wellen, R. (Eds.). (2013). Making policy in turbulent times: challenges and prospects for higher education. Montreal: McGill-Queen's University Press.
- Axelrod, P. (Ed.). (2004). Knowledge matters: essays in honour of Bernard J. Shapiro. Montreal: McGill-Queen's University Press.
- Axelrod, P. D. (2002). Values in conflict: the university, the marketplace and the trials of liberal education. Montreal: McGill-Queen's University Press.
- Anisef, P., Axelrod, P., Baichman-Anisef, E., James, C., & Turrittin, A. H. (2000). Opportunity and uncertainty: life course experiences of the class of '73. Toronto: University of Toronto Press.
- Axelrod, P. (1997, 1999, 2003). The promise of schooling: education in Canada, 1800-1914. Toronto: University of Toronto Press.
- Axelrod, P., Anisef, P. (Eds.). 1993. Transitions: schooling and employment in Canada. Toronto: Thompson Educational Publishers.
- Axelrod, P. (1990). Making a middle class: student life in English Canada during the thirties. Montreal: McGill-Queen's University Press.
- Axelrod, P., Reid, J. (Eds.). (1989). Youth, university, and Canadian society: essays in the social history of higher education. Montreal: McGill-Queen's University Press.
- Axelrod, P. (1982, 1986). Scholars and Dollars: Politics, Economics and the Universities of Ontario, 1945-1980. Toronto: University of Toronto Press.
