= Baseball Heritage Museum =

Museum in Cleveland, Ohio, U.S.

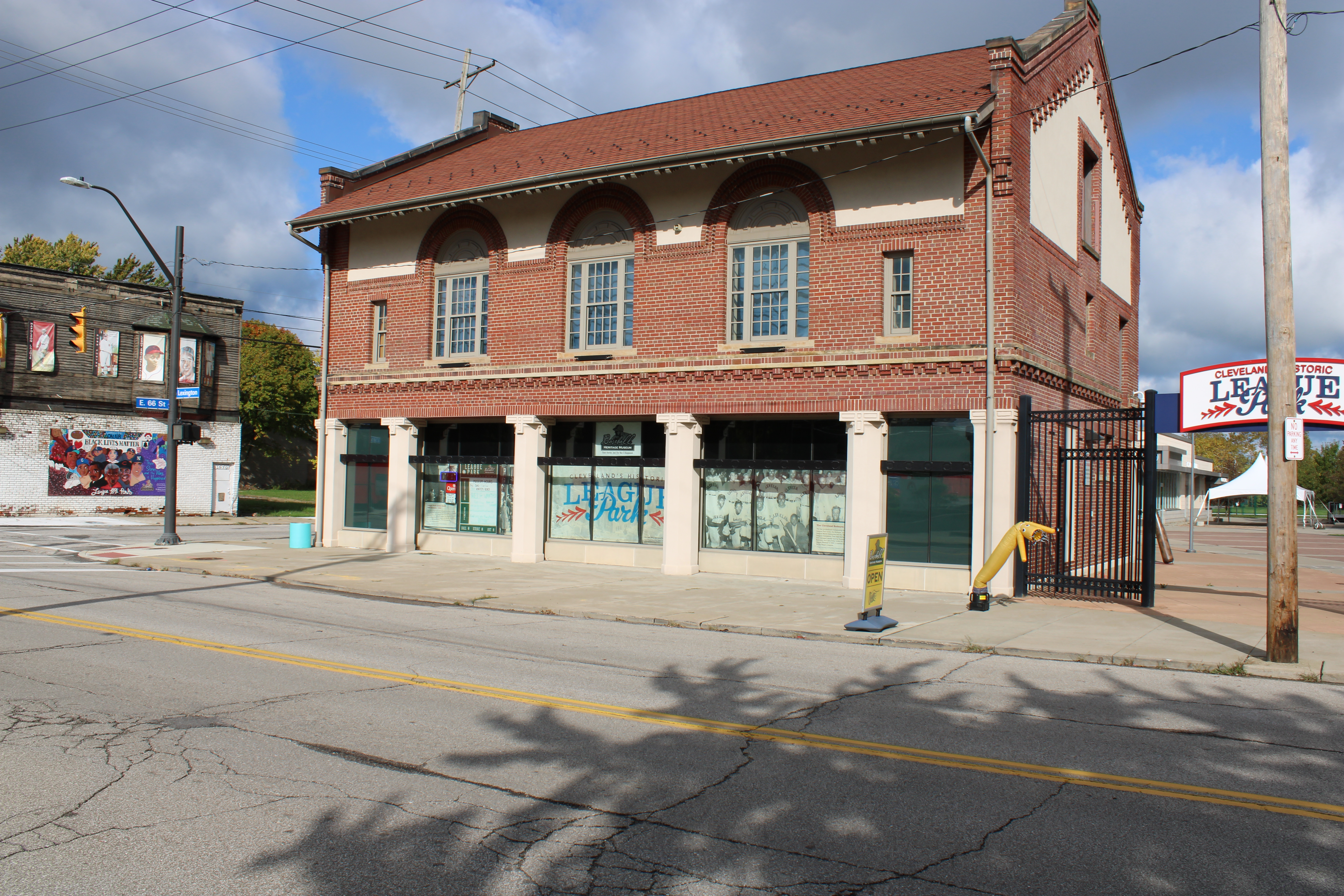
- The museum in 2021
- Established: July 7, 1997; 29 years ago
- Location: 6601 Lexington Avenue, Cleveland, Ohio, 44103
- Coordinates: 41°30′40.3″N 81°38′39.42″W
- Director: Bob Zimmer Museum Director Ricardo Rodriguez
- Website: baseballheritagemuseum.org
- League Park
- U.S. National Register of Historic Places
- Location within Cleveland Location within Ohio Location within the United States
- Location: Lexington Ave. and E. 66th St., Cleveland, Ohio
- Coordinates: 41°30′42″N 81°38′39″W
- Area: 1 acre (0.40 ha)
- Built: 1908
- NRHP reference No.: 79001808
- Added to NRHP: August 8, 1979

The Baseball Heritage Museum is a baseball museum in the Hough neighborhood of Cleveland, Ohio. The Heritage Baseball Museum was founded in 1997 and is located at League Park, former home of the Cleveland Indians. The Baseball Heritage Museum is part of the renovated League Park complex and is housed in the former League Park ticket house.

== History ==
The Baseball Heritage Museum was founded in 1997, and was first housed at a location in downtown Cleveland. To correspond with the 1997 Major League Baseball All-Star Game at Cleveland's Jacobs Field, Robert Zimmer first displayed his family's collection of baseball historical items at the family jewelry store.

The Baseball Heritage Museum continued to grow from founder Robert Zimmer's personal family collection. It grew to include baseball artifacts from the major leagues, Negro leagues, women's baseball leagues, Caribbean leagues, industrial and barnstorming leagues.

The first "Baseball Heritage Museum Festival" took place in May 2006 with former players such as Bob Feller and Buck O'Neill attending.

In 2006, the Baseball Heritage Museum moved to a second location in the Euclid Arcade on Euclid Avenue in Cleveland. Finally, to correspond with renovation of the League Park site, the museum moved to its present location in 2014. League Park was the former home of the Cleveland Indians and other Cleveland-based teams and is on the National Register of Historic Places. As part of an extensive project, League Park was renovated in 2014 to include a new ballfield, and the museum is housed in the refurbished former Ticket House of League Park.

In 2014, there were 2,000 patrons in attendance for the grand opening of the new Baseball Heritage Museum location at League Park.

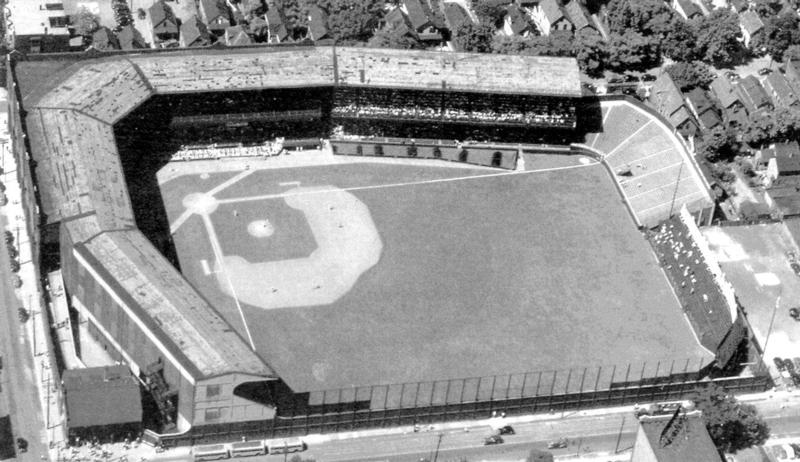
League Park, home of the Cleveland Spiders from 1891 to 1899 and the Cleveland Indians from 1901 to 1946. Park was rebuilt in concrete and steel for the 1910 season. The Ticket House is in the lower left corner of the photo.

Former Cleveland Indians infielder Vern Fuller was the original executive director of the Baseball Heritage Museum. In 2017, Mike Gaynier was appointed executive director.

Today, the museum sponsors the Baseball Heritage Museum Buckeyes Travel Baseball Team Program, as well as holding youth clinics and events at the renovated League Park.
