= Addie Joss =

American baseball player (1880–1911)

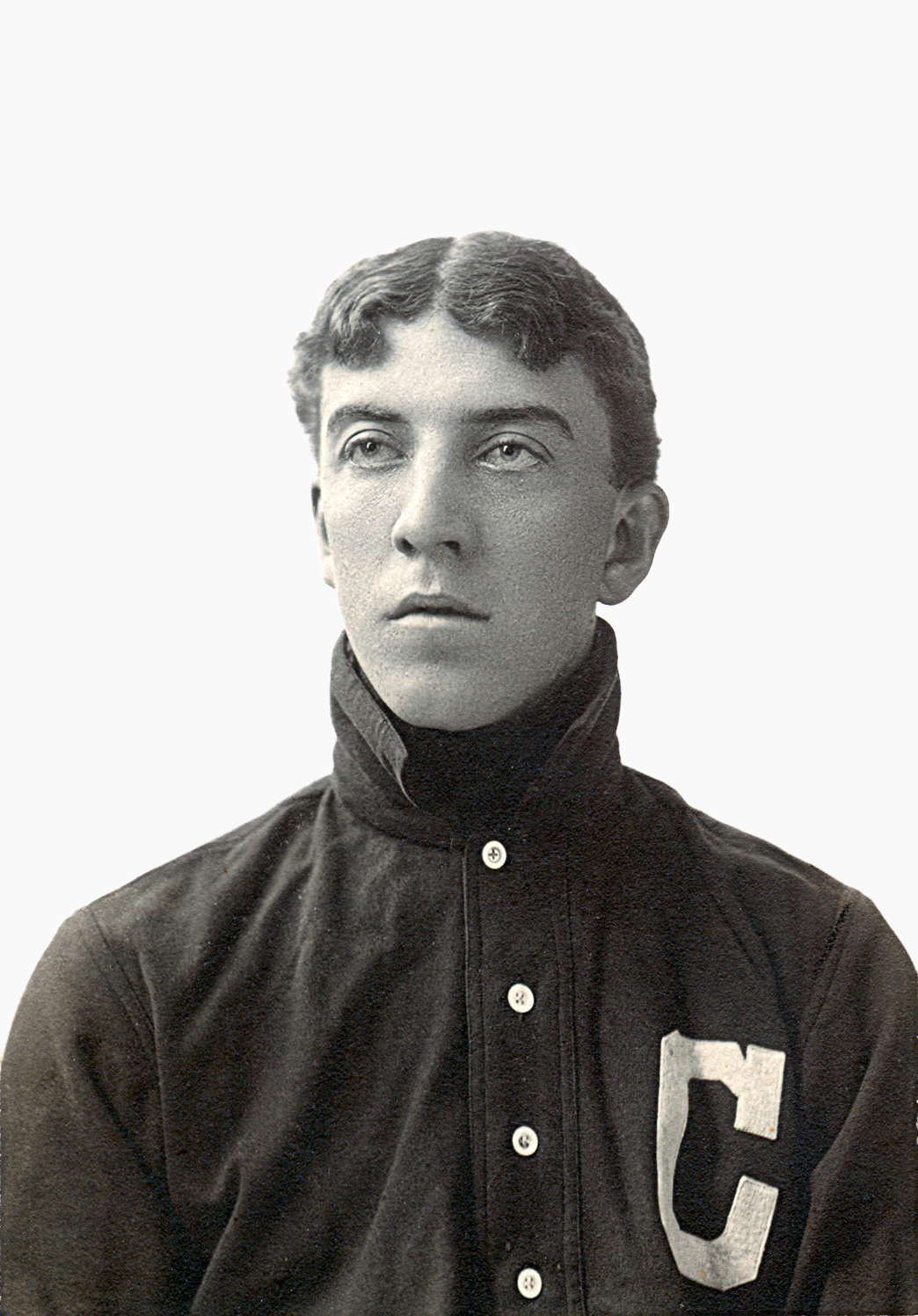
- Pitcher
- Born: April 12, 1880; Woodland, Wisconsin, U.S.
- Died: April 14, 1911 (aged 31); Toledo, Ohio, U.S.
- Batted: Right Threw: Right

MLB debut
- April 25, 1902, for the Cleveland Bronchos

Last MLB appearance
- July 25, 1910, for the Cleveland Naps

MLB statistics
- Win–loss record: 160–97
- Earned run average: 1.89
- Strikeouts: 920
- WHIP: 0.968
- Stats at Baseball Reference

Teams
- Cleveland Bronchos / Naps (1902–1910)

Career highlights and awards
- MLB wins leader (1907); 2× MLB ERA leader (1904, 1908); Pitched a perfect game on October 2, 1908; Pitched two no-hitters; MLB record .968 career WHIP; Cleveland Guardians Hall of Fame

Member of the National

Baseball Hall of Fame
- Induction: 1978
- Election method: Veterans Committee

Adrian "Addie" Joss (April 12, 1880 – April 14, 1911), nicknamed "the Human Hairpin", was an American professional baseball pitcher. He pitched for the Cleveland Bronchos of Major League Baseball, later known as the Naps, between 1902 and 1910. Joss, who was 6 feet 3 inches (1.91 m) and weighed 185 pounds (84 kg), pitched the fourth perfect game in baseball history (which, additionally, was only the second of the modern era). His 1.89 career earned run average (ERA) is the second-lowest in MLB history, behind Ed Walsh, while his career WHIP of 0.968 is the lowest of all-time.

Joss was born and raised in Wisconsin, where he attended St. Mary's College (later part of Wyalusing Academy) in Prairie du Chien and the University of Wisconsin. He played baseball at St. Mary's and then played in a semipro league where he caught the attention of Connie Mack. Joss did not sign with Mack's team, but he attracted further major league interest after winning 19 games in 1900 for the Toledo Mud Hens. Joss had another strong season for Toledo in 1901.

After an offseason contract dispute between Joss, Toledo and Cleveland, he debuted with the Cleveland club in April 1902. Joss led the league in shutouts that year. By 1905, Joss had completed the first of his four consecutive 20-win seasons. Off the field, Joss worked as a newspaper sportswriter from 1906 until his death. In 1908, he pitched a perfect game during a tight pennant race that saw Cleveland finish a half-game out of first place; it was the closest that Joss came to a World Series berth. The 1910 season was his last, and Joss missed most of the year due to injury.

In April 1911, Joss became ill and he died the same month due to tuberculous meningitis. He finished his career with 160 wins, 234 complete games, 45 shutouts and 920 strikeouts. Though Joss played only nine seasons and missed significant playing time due to various ailments, the National Baseball Hall of Fame's Board of Directors passed a special resolution for Joss in 1977 that waived the typical ten-year minimum playing career for Hall of Fame eligibility and he was voted into the Hall of Fame by the Veterans Committee in 1978.

== Early life ==
Addie Joss was born on April 12, 1880, in Woodland, Dodge County, Wisconsin. His parents Jacob and Theresa (née Staudenmeyer) were farmers; his father, a cheesemaker who was involved in local politics, had emigrated from Switzerland. A heavy drinker of alcohol, he died from liver complications in 1890, when Joss was 10 years old; Joss remained sober throughout his life as a result of his father's death. Joss attended elementary school in Juneau and Portage and high school at Wayland Academy in Beaver Dam, Wisconsin. By age 16 he finished high school and began teaching himself. He was offered a scholarship to attend St. Mary's College (also known as Sacred Heart College) in Watertown, where he played on the school's baseball team. He also attended the University of Wisconsin (now University of Wisconsin–Madison), where he studied engineering. Officials in Watertown were impressed with the quality of play of St. Mary's and put the team on a semipro circuit. During his time on the semipro circuit, Joss employed his unique pitching windup, which involved hiding the ball until the very last moment in his delivery.

Connie Mack also sent a scout to watch Joss and later offered the young pitcher a job playing on his Albany club in the Western League, which Joss declined. In 1899, Joss played for a team in Oshkosh, earning $10 per week ($387 in today's dollars). After player salaries were frozen by team owners, Joss joined the junior team in Manitowoc, which had been split into two teams, as a second baseman and was soon promoted to the senior squad, where he was developed into a pitcher. He was seen by a scout for the Toledo Mud Hens and in 1900 accepted a position with the team for $75 per month ($2,903). While in Ohio he was considered "the best amateur pitcher in the state." He started the Mud Hens' season opener on April 28 and earned the win in the team's 16–8 victory. He won 19 games for the club in 1900.

=== Contract dispute ===
Midway through the 1901 season, the Boston Americans of the upstart American League offered $1,500 ($58,050) to Toledo to buy out Joss's contract. The St. Louis Cardinals of the National League (NL) matched Boston's offer; Toledo rejected both offers. Joss continued to pitch for the Mud Hens and by the end of the 1901 season he had won 27 games and had 216 strikeouts (some sources say 25 games). He became known as "the god of the Western League."

After the season ended, Joss returned to Wisconsin where he led Racine to the 1901 Wisconsin baseball state championship against Rube Waddell's Kenosha squad. He also enrolled at Beloit College and played American football. It was reported that Joss had signed with the Brooklyn Dodgers of the National League as early as August 18 and received a $400 advance ($15,480), but Joss denied receiving any money. Mud Hens owner Charles Stroebel stated that he had signed Joss and other Mud Hens players for the 1902 season on August 12 and that the Western League was under the protection of the National League through September 1901. Before 1901 ended, the Cleveland Bronchos offered $500 ($19,350) to Toledo in exchange for Joss and manager Bob Gilks, who would be a scout for Cleveland. Toledo and Joss agreed and Joss was now a member of the American League, which was paying a premium on baseball talent to rival the National League. Dodgers owner Charles Ebbets invited Joss for a meeting, which Joss declined, and Joss let it be known that he had told Stroebel he would play for the Mud Hens for the 1902 season, and received a $150 ($5,582) advance in February 1902.

In March 1902, Joss signed with Cleveland. Toledo sportswriters took exception to Joss, one writing that "he voluntarily signed a contract [with Toledo] for this season but when Bill Armour of Cleveland showed him the $500 bill he forgot his pledge and sneaked off like a whipped cur." Stroebel later argued that Joss had returned only $100 of the $150 advance. For not returning the entire advance, Joss was charged with a felony and Stroebel pursued legal action. Joss made his major league debut with the Bronchos on April 26, and two days later he arrived in Toledo to turn himself in, accompanied by Bronchos majority owner Charles Somers, who was also American League vice president. The court set bond at $500 ($18,606). Stroebel also filed a civil suit against the Bronchos, stating that his business had been interfered with, but Stroebel agreed to withdraw his charges in July when he accepted Bronchos pitcher Jack Lundbom.

== Major league career ==
=== Cleveland Bronchos/Naps (1902–1907) ===
Joss made his major league debut with the Cleveland Bronchos (also known as the Bluebirds) against the St. Louis Browns. The Browns' Jesse Burkett hit a shallow pop fly in the direction of right fielder Zaza Harvey. Home plate umpire Bob Caruthers ruled that Harvey did not make a clean catch, so Burkett was credited with a hit. (Harvey and witnesses said the ball never hit the ground.) Joss finished his major league debut with a one-hitter.

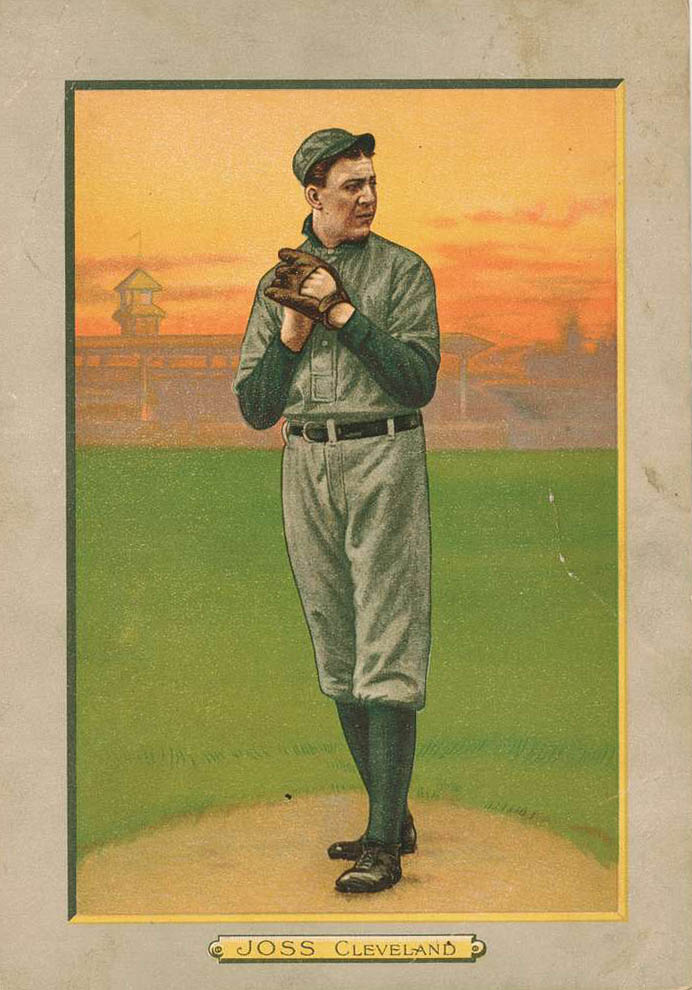

Joss compiled a 17–13 record and 2.77 ERA during his major league rookie season. He led the American League with five shutouts.

On October 11, 1902, Joss married Lillian Shinivar in Monroe, Michigan. Shinivar was in attendance when Joss made his professional debut with the Mud Hens in 1900. The couple had a son, Norman, and a daughter, Ruth. Following the conclusion of the 1902 season, Joss was selected to the All-Americans, an all-star team from the American League who played exhibition games against their counterparts from the National League. To begin the 1903 season, the Cleveland organization changed the team's name to the "Naps" in honor of second baseman Nap Lajoie. In Joss' second year, he went 18–13 and lowered his ERA from the season before to 2.19. His walks plus hits per inning pitched (WHIP) was an MLB-low 0.948.

For the 1904 season, the 24-year-old Joss went 14–10 with a 1.59 ERA and did not give up a home run during the season. Illness during the season reduced his starts. He had his first of four 20-win seasons in 1905 as he ended the season with a 20–12 record and 2.01 ERA. He finished with a career-high 132 strikeouts. In 1906 his 1.72 ERA was third in the league and he finished with a 21–9 record and tied a career-high with nine shutouts. To begin the 1907 season, Joss won his first 10 starts. He threw two one-hitters during the season, the first on September 4 against the Detroit Tigers and the second on September 25 versus the New York Highlanders. When teammate Heinie Berger threw his own one-hitter on September 26, it marked just the second time since 1900 that two pitchers from the same team had thrown back-to-back one-hitters. Joss finished the season with career-bests in wins (finished 27–11) and 338 2/3 innings pitched. His win total tied with Doc White for highest in the American League and his WHIP was second-best (behind Cy Young) while both his complete game (34) and shutout (6) totals were third-best in the league.

=== 1908 season and perfect game ===
Before the 1908 season started, the Naps' home field, League Park, was expanded by about 4,000 seats. The Detroit Tigers, Chicago White Sox, and Naps were engaged in a race for the postseason described as "one of the closest and most exciting known." Three games remained in the regular season and the Naps were a half-game behind the Detroit Tigers as they headed into an October 2, 1908, match-up against the Chicago White Sox, who trailed the Naps by one game. Game attendance was announced at 10,598, which was labeled by sportswriter Franklin Lewis as an "excellent turnout for a weekday."

In what proved to be one of the tightest ever pitching duels in a perfect game, Joss took the mound for the Naps, while the White Sox pitcher was future Hall of Famer Ed Walsh. Neither pitcher would give up an earned run in the 1–0 game. Walsh, blistering through his own 39 win season, struck out 15 batters, gave up only one base on balls and allowed only four scattered hits by the Naps. The Naps' Joe Birmingham scored the team's only run, which came in the third inning—the lone, unearned run scored as a result of a botched pickoff play and a wild pitch. The tension in the ballpark was described by one writer as "a mouse working his way along the grandstand floor would have sounded like a shovel scraping over concrete." Joss, having faced the minimum 24 batters in the first eight innings, retired the first two batters in the top of the ninth. Joss then faced White Sox pinch hitter John Anderson. Anderson hit a line drive that could have resulted in a double had it not gone foul. He then hit a ball to Naps third baseman Bill Bradley, which Bradley bobbled before throwing to first baseman George Stovall. Stovall dug the ball out of the dirt to achieve the final out. With the win, Joss recorded the second ever perfect game in MLB's modern era. He accomplished the feat with just 74 pitches, the lowest known pitch count ever achieved in a perfect game. Fans swarmed the field. After the game, Joss said, "I never could have done it without Larry Lajoie's and Stovall's fielding and without Birmingham's base running. Walsh was marvelous with his spitter, and we needed two lucky strikes to win."

For the season, Joss averaged 0.83 walks per nine innings, becoming one of 29 pitchers in MLB history to average less than one walk per nine innings. His season-ending WHIP of .806 is the fifth-lowest single-season mark in MLB history. The Naps finished with a 90–64 record, a half-game behind Detroit. It was the closest Joss ever got to a World Series appearance.

=== Final years with Naps (1909–10) ===
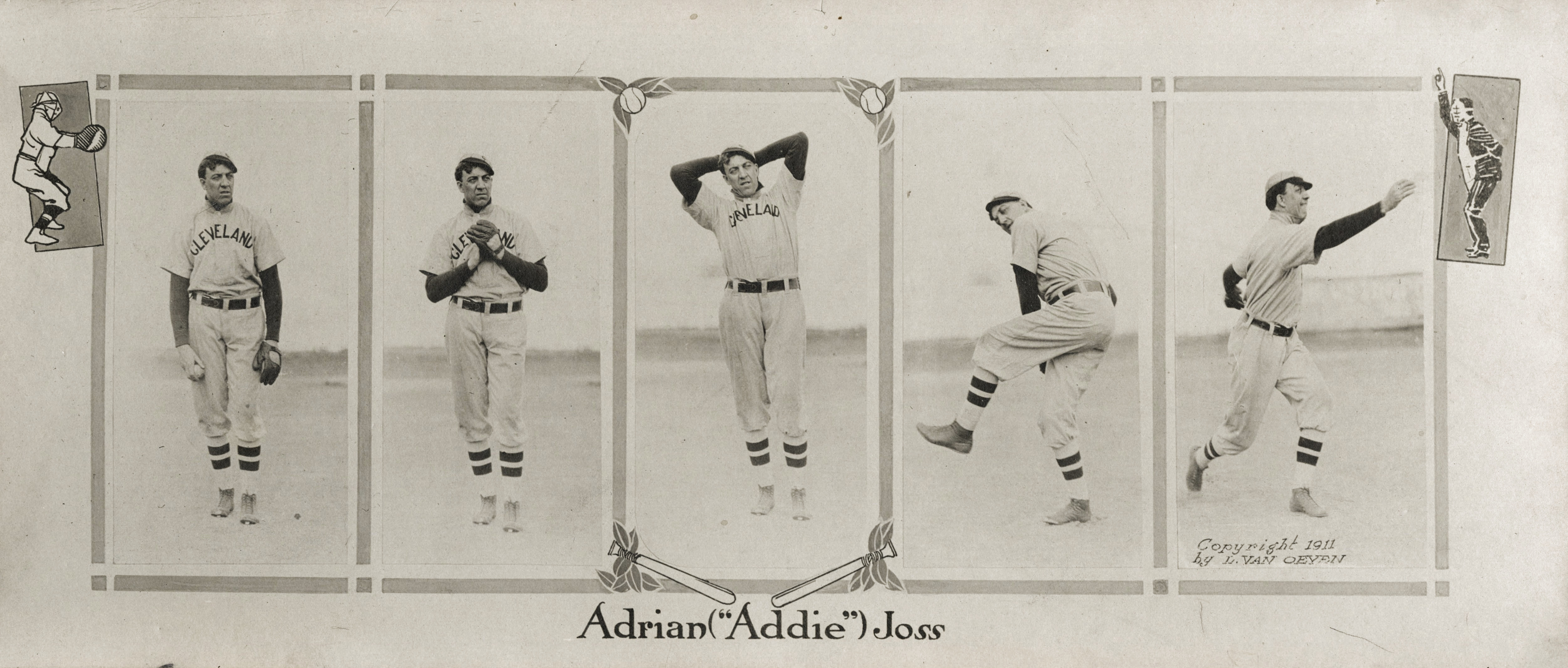
Joss near the end of his career

After amassing four consecutive 20-win seasons, Joss struggled in 1909 as a result of fatigue; by September he was shut down for the season. Joss finished the year with a 14–13 record in 242 2/3 innings pitched and recorded a 1.71 ERA. He finished fourth in the American League in ERA and third in WHIP (.944).

Joss pitched a second no-hitter, on April 20, 1910, against the White Sox, becoming the first pitcher in MLB history to no-hit the same team twice, a feat not matched until Tim Lincecum of the San Francisco Giants no-hit the San Diego Padres in both 2013 and 2014. In the second inning, the White Sox' Freddy Parent hit a ball toward third base. Bill Bradley failed to field the ball cleanly and thus his throw to first base was not in time to get Parent out. The initial ruling on the field was a base hit but it was later changed to an error. Joss gave up two walks and recorded 10 assists. He made just 13 appearances that season due to a torn ligament in his right elbow. Joss made his last appearance of the season on July 25, and left the game in the fifth inning due to arm soreness. In his final game, he allowed three runs on five hits and two walks with six strikeouts in a 4–0 loss. The Naps finished 71–82. In his final major league season, Joss finished with a 5–5 record in 107 1/3 innings. The Naps finished the year 71–81. This marked the fifth time in Joss' nine years that the franchise finished with a losing record.

=== Career marks ===
Of Joss' 160 major league wins, 45 were shutouts. Joss' 1.89 career ERA is ranked second all-time (to Ed Walsh), while his 0.97 WHIP (walks and hits per inning pitched) is the lowest career WHIP in MLB history. He finished with a 160–97 record, 234 complete games, and 920 strikeouts.

Joss' repertoire included a fastball, a "slow ball" (today known as a changeup), and an "extremely effective" curve. Baseball historians Rob Neyer and Bill James ranked Joss' fastball third (1900–1904) and sixth (1905–1909) in the major leagues. George Moriarty explained that Joss had only one curveball because "he believed that with a few well mastered deliveries he could acquire great control and success with less strain on his arm." In an era filled with spitball pitchers, Joss achieved his success without ever altering the baseball. Joss threw with a corkscrew windup motion, described as "an exaggerated pinwheel motion." Shortstop Roger Peckinpaugh described his windup: "He would turn his back toward the batter as he wound up, hiding the ball all the while, and then whip around and fire it in."

Illness and injury accompanied Joss throughout much of his professional career. In 1903, a high fever forced him to miss the last month of the season. He contracted malaria in April 1904 and then missed several starts with a back injury in 1905.

== Journalism and engineering interests ==
Joss was concerned about supporting his family after his baseball career ended; many players of the day had little education and few marketable job skills beyond their abilities on the diamond. As sportswriter Franklin Lewis wrote, "Only a handful of players in the rough, stirring, early days of the major leagues arrived from campuses. And when they did, sometimes the shock was too great for them. Some grizzled holdovers from the 1890s were around and they bore down heavily on the eardrums of the so-called college-boy set." Joss was hired as a sports columnist after the 1906 season for the Toledo News-Bee. He also served as their Sunday sports editor. His writings proved so popular that sales of the paper increased and a special phone line was installed in his office to field the large volume of calls he received from fans. The increased popularity gave him an advantage when negotiating with the Naps before the 1907 season, and the club agreed to pay him $4,000 (equivalent to $138,000 in 2025). (By 1910, player salaries averaged only $2,500.)

He later also wrote for the Cleveland Press and covered the World Series for the News-Bee and Press from 1907 to 1909. The Press introduced Joss in columns this way: "Of all the baseball players in the land, Addie Joss is far and away the best qualified for this work. A scholarly man, an entertaining writer, an impartial observer of the game." Biographer Scott Longert wrote that "the writer was becoming as well-known as the ballplayer." An editorial in the Toledo Blade said, "In taking his vocation seriously, [Joss] was, in return, taken seriously by the people, who recognized in him a man of more than usual intelligence and one who would have adorned any profession in which he had elected to engage."

During the 1908–1909 offseasons, Joss worked on designing an electric scoreboard that would later be known as the Joss Indicator. The Naps decided to install the scoreboard, which allowed spectators to monitor balls and strikes at League Park.

== Death and benefit game ==
Joss attended spring training with Cleveland before the start of the 1911 season. He collapsed on the field from heat prostration on April 3 in an exhibition game in Chattanooga, Tennessee. He was taken to a local hospital and released the next day. As early as April 7, press reports had taken note of his ill health, but speculated about "ptomaine poisoning" or "nervous indigestion." The Naps traveled to Toledo for exhibition games on April 10 and Joss went to his home on Fulton Street where he was seen by his personal physician, Dr. George W. Chapman. Chapman thought Joss could be suffering from nervous indigestion or food poisoning. By April 9, as Joss was coughing more and had a severe headache, Chapman changed his diagnosis to pleurisy and reported that Joss would not be able to play for one month and would need ten days of rest to recover. Joss could not stand on his own and his speech was slurred. On April 13, Chapman sought a second opinion from the Naps' team doctor, who performed a lumbar puncture and diagnosed Joss with tuberculous meningitis.^{[b]} The disease had spread to Joss' brain and he died on April 14, 1911, two days after his 31st birthday and two days after Cleveland's season opener.

Joss was well-liked by his peers and baseball fans. Upon hearing of his death, the Press wrote "every train brings flowers" and "floral tributes by the wagonload are hourly arriving at the Joss home from all sections of the country." His family arranged for the funeral to take place on April 17. On that day, the Naps were to face the Detroit Tigers. Naps players signed a petition stating that they would not attend the game so they could instead attend the funeral. They asked for the game to be rescheduled, but the Tigers balked at the request. American League president Ban Johnson initially supported the Tigers' position, but he ultimately sided with the Naps. Naps owner Charles Somers and 15 Naps players attended the funeral, which was officiated by player-turned-evangelist Billy Sunday.

The first "all-star" game was played as a benefit for Joss's family on July 24, 1911. The Naps invited players from the other seven American League teams to play against them. Visiting club players who were involved in the game included Home Run Baker, Ty Cobb, Eddie Collins, Sam Crawford, Walter Johnson, Tris Speaker, Gabby Street, and Smoky Joe Wood. "I'll do anything they want for Addie Joss' family", Johnson said. Washington Senators manager Jimmy McAleer volunteered to manage the all-stars. "The memory of Addie Joss is sacred to everyone with whom he ever came in contact. The man never wore a uniform who was a greater credit to the sport than he", McAleer said. The game was attended by approximately 15,270 fans and raised nearly $13,000 ($449,000 today) to help Joss' family members pay remaining medical bills. The Naps lost, 5–3.

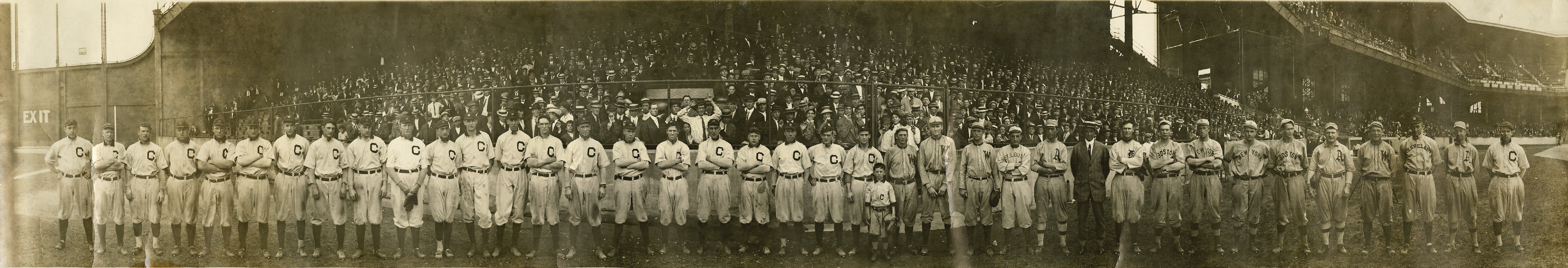

== Recognition ==
Boston Globe sports editor Jason Nason campaigned for Joss' induction into the Hall of Fame starting in the 1950s. Sportswriter Red Smith wrote in 1970 in support of Joss. "Could you write a history of baseball without mentioning Joss? Nobody ever has. That ought to be the measure of a man's fitness for the Hall of Fame, the only measure." However, Warren Giles, then-chairman of the Hall of Fame's Veterans Committee, pointed out to baseball historian Bob Broeg in 1972 that induction to the Hall required "participation in ten championship seasons." Joss had been on the Cleveland roster in 1911 and participated in spring training, falling ill just before regular season play commenced. Hence it was argued he had "participated" in the 1911 season, his tenth. The Hall's Board of Directors waived the eligibility requirements for Joss. Joe Reichler, a member of the Commissioner's office, worked to allow Joss to become eligible for the Hall and succeeded in 1977. Joss was inducted into the Baseball Hall of Fame in 1978. He is the only player in the Hall of Fame whose regular season playing career lasted less than 10 years.

In 1981, Lawrence Ritter and Donald Honig included him in their book The 100 Greatest Baseball Players of All Time. They described what they called "the Smoky Joe Wood Syndrome", where a player of truly exceptional talent has a career curtailed by injury or illness. They argued that such a player should still be included among the greatest all-time players, in spite of career statistics that would not quantitatively rank him with the all-time greats. They believed that Joss' career ERA was proof enough of his greatness to be included. Baseball author John Tierney wrote: "Joss is remembered for a remarkably low career ERA, but he pitched in a time before earned runs were compiled as an official statistic, and his career ended in 1910, before the American League introduced its new baseball in 1911, leading to a nearly 25 percent increase in runs scored."

Joss was inducted into the Cleveland Guardians Hall of Fame on July 29, 2006. He was inducted in the same class as Ray Chapman, Rocky Colavito, Al López, Sam McDowell, Al Rosen and Herb Score.

== Footnotes ==
- ^{a} Sources differ on the number of one-hitters. Porter states six one-hitters while Schneider lists five. A career summary at the time of his Hall of Fame selection noted seven in total which is consistent with records at the time of Bob Feller's eighth one-hitter in 1946.
- ^{b} Fleitz writes in Shoeless: The Life and Times of Joe Jackson that Joss was diagnosed with pleurisy by the Naps team doctor while in Chattanooga. Coffey writes in 27 Men Out: Baseball's Perfect Games while on a train ride back to Toledo, Joss stopped in Cincinnati and was diagnosed by "a doctor" who stated Joss had "congestion in his right lung with a bad attack of pleurisy" and an "affection [sic] of the brain." Kneib writes in Meningitis the Naps were scheduled to go to Cincinnati but Joss did not receive an examination until he returned to Toledo, where he was examined and diagnosed with pleurisy by his personal physician and roughly a week later, seen in Toledo by the Naps' team doctor who diagnosed Joss with tubercular meningitis.

== See also ==
- List of Major League Baseball annual ERA leaders
- List of Major League Baseball annual wins leaders
- List of Major League Baseball career WHIP leaders
- List of Major League Baseball career ERA leaders
- List of Major League Baseball career FIP leaders
- List of Major League Baseball career shutout leaders
- List of Major League Baseball perfect games
- List of Major League Baseball no-hitters
- List of Major League Baseball players who spent their entire career with one franchise
- List of baseball players who died during their careers

Awards and achievements
Preceded by Cy Young	Perfect game pitcher October 2, 1908	Succeeded by Charlie Robertson
Preceded by Bob Rhoads; Addie Joss	No-hitter pitcher October 2, 1908; April 20, 1910	Succeeded by Addie Joss; Chief Bender
