= Hough, Cleveland =

Neighborhood of Cleveland, Ohio, United States

Coordinates: 41.512334°N 81.635213°W

Hough
- Neighborhood of Cleveland
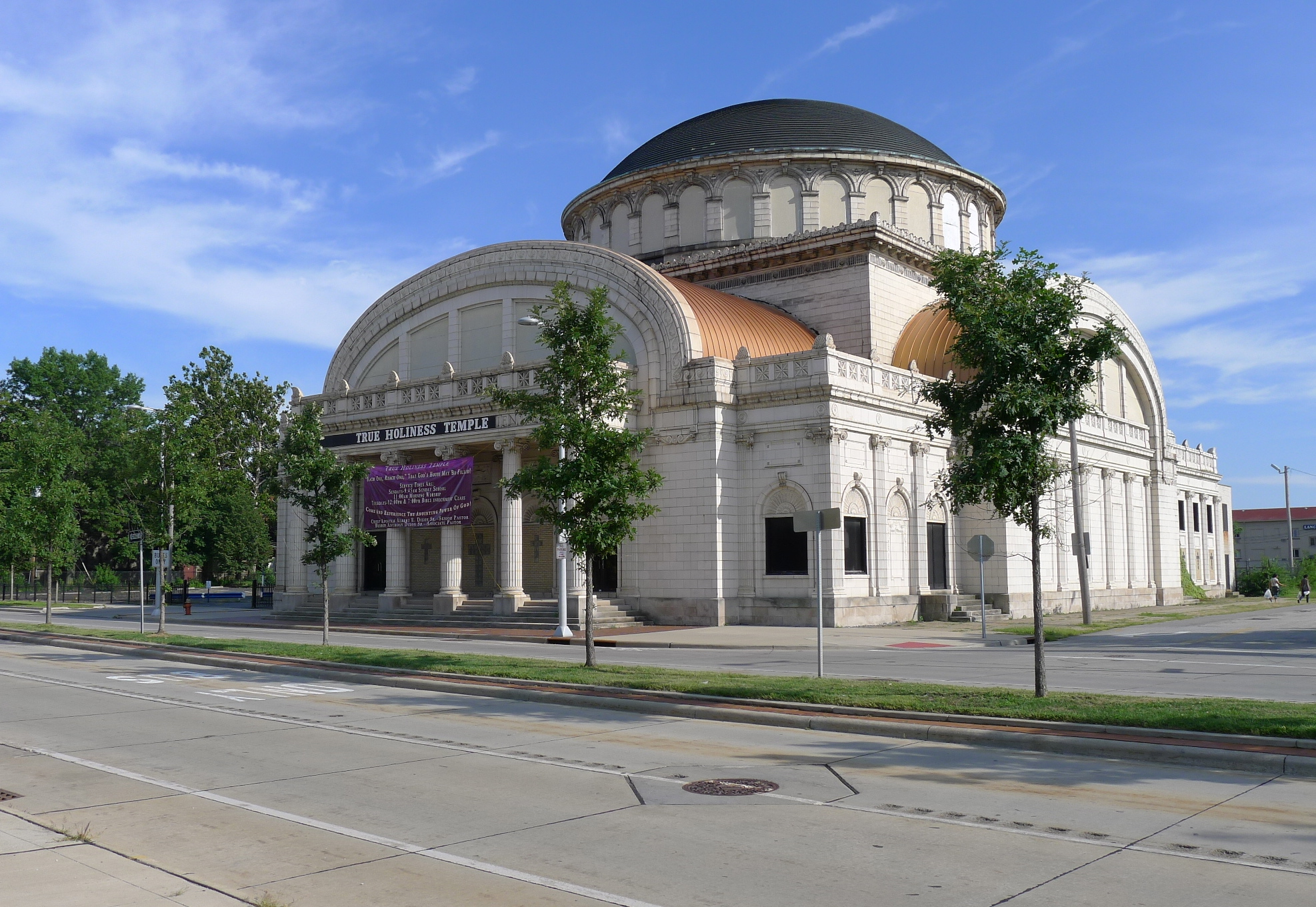
- True Holiness Temple on Euclid Avenue, located on the border between Hough and Fairfax neighborhoods.

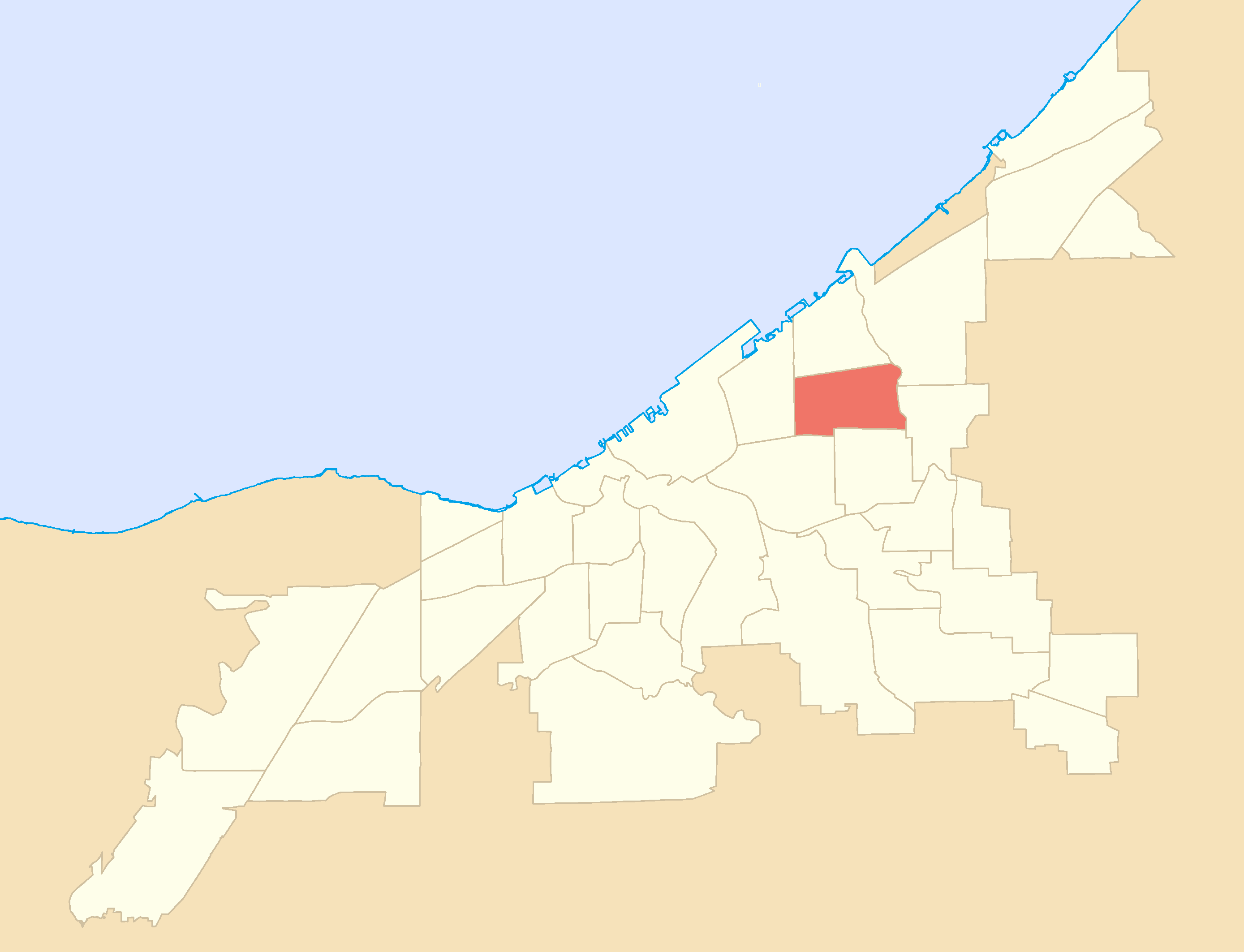
- Location in the city of Cleveland
- Country: United States
- State: Ohio
- County: Cuyahoga County
- City: Cleveland

Population (2020)
  - Total: 10,755

Demographics
  - White: 7.6%
  - Black: 88.4%
  - Hispanic (of any race): 2%
  - Asian and Pacific Islander: 1.5%
  - Mixed and Other: 2.5%
- Time zone: UTC-5 (EST)
  - Summer (DST): UTC-4 (EDT)
- ZIP Codes: parts of 44106, 44103
- Area code: 216
- Median income: $19,003
- Source: 2020 U.S. Census, Cleveland City Planning Commission

Hough (pronounced /hʌf/) is a neighborhood situated on the East Side of Cleveland, Ohio. Roughly two square miles, the neighborhood is bounded to Superior and Euclid Avenue between East 55th and East 105th streets. Placed between Downtown Cleveland and University Circle, Hough borders Fairfax and Cedar–Central to the South and Glenville and St. Clair–Superior to the North. The neighborhood became a target for revitalization during the mid-20th century, after the 1966 Hough Riots.

== History ==
=== Early history ===
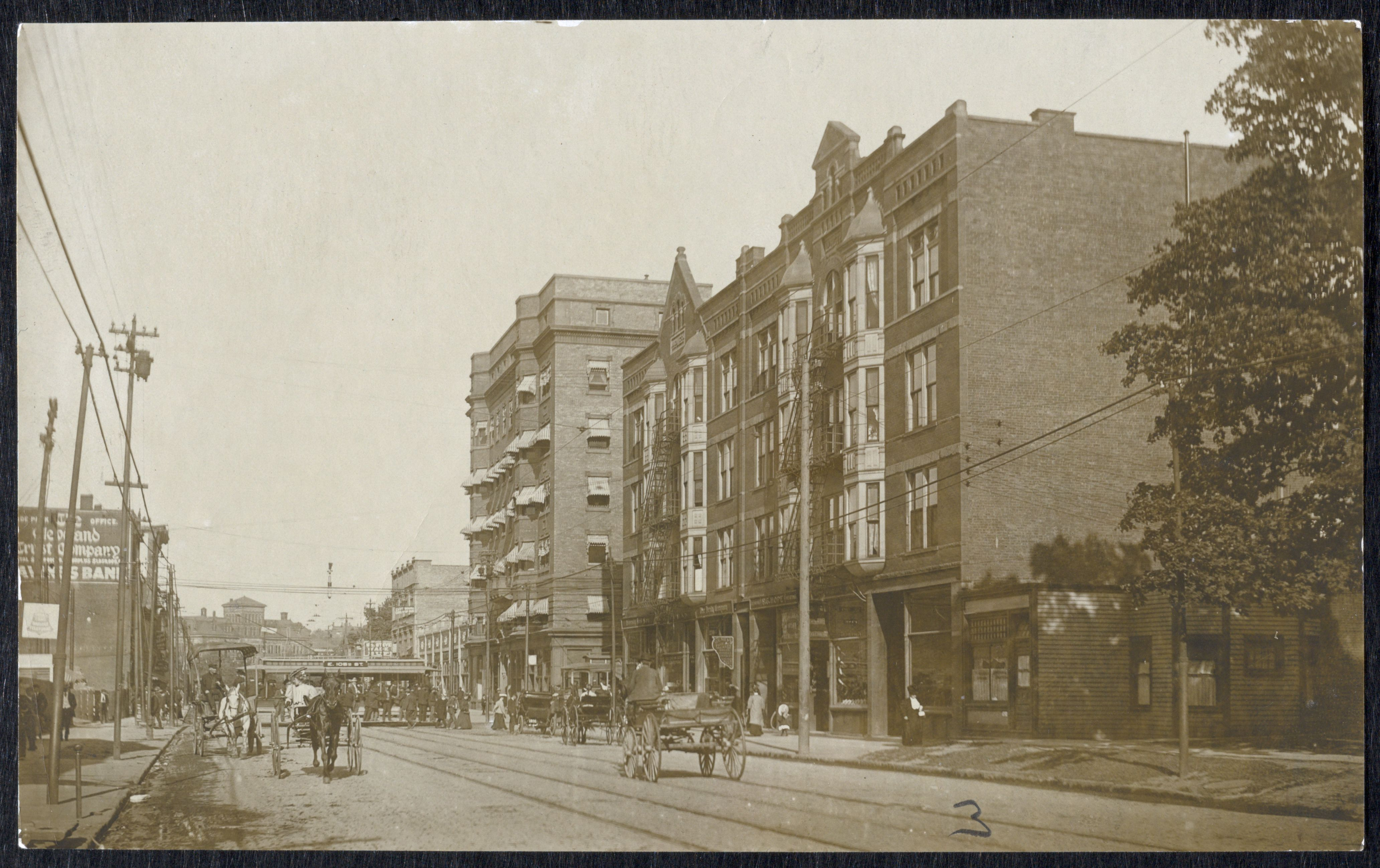
Euclid Avenue, c. 1905

Hough is one of Cleveland's oldest neighborhoods, named after Oliver and Eliza Hough, who first settled in the area in 1799. The neighborhood was incorporated into the city of Cleveland in 1873. At the start of the twentieth century, Hough was a community for primarily affluent white residents. Prominent local families, such as the Severances and the Boltons, lived in Hough at this time, rivaling Millionaire's Row on Euclid Avenue. Business sprung up around this period, including the Warner & Swasey Company in 1881. Other commercial institutions included the Doan's Corner Shopping District on East 105th and Hough Bakery (later Hough Bakeries Inc.) near East 87th Street on Hough Avenue.

After the First World War, this population dwindled, leaving an ethnic European working-class majority. Hough then lost prominent institutions within the community, including University School and League Park, the latter of which being the original home of the Cleveland Indians. University School moved out to Shaker Heights, and the Indians slowly moved out to Cleveland Municipal Stadium in Downtown.

The Great Depression exacerbated Hough's neighborhood deterioration, including a lack of dwelling space amidst population growth, conversion of single-family homes into multi-family homes, and a decrease in home ownership. During Prohibition, the area between Lexington and Hough Avenues between East 73rd and East 79th Streets was known as "Little Hollywood" for the large number of brothels and speakeasies located there.

=== Transition to an African American community ===
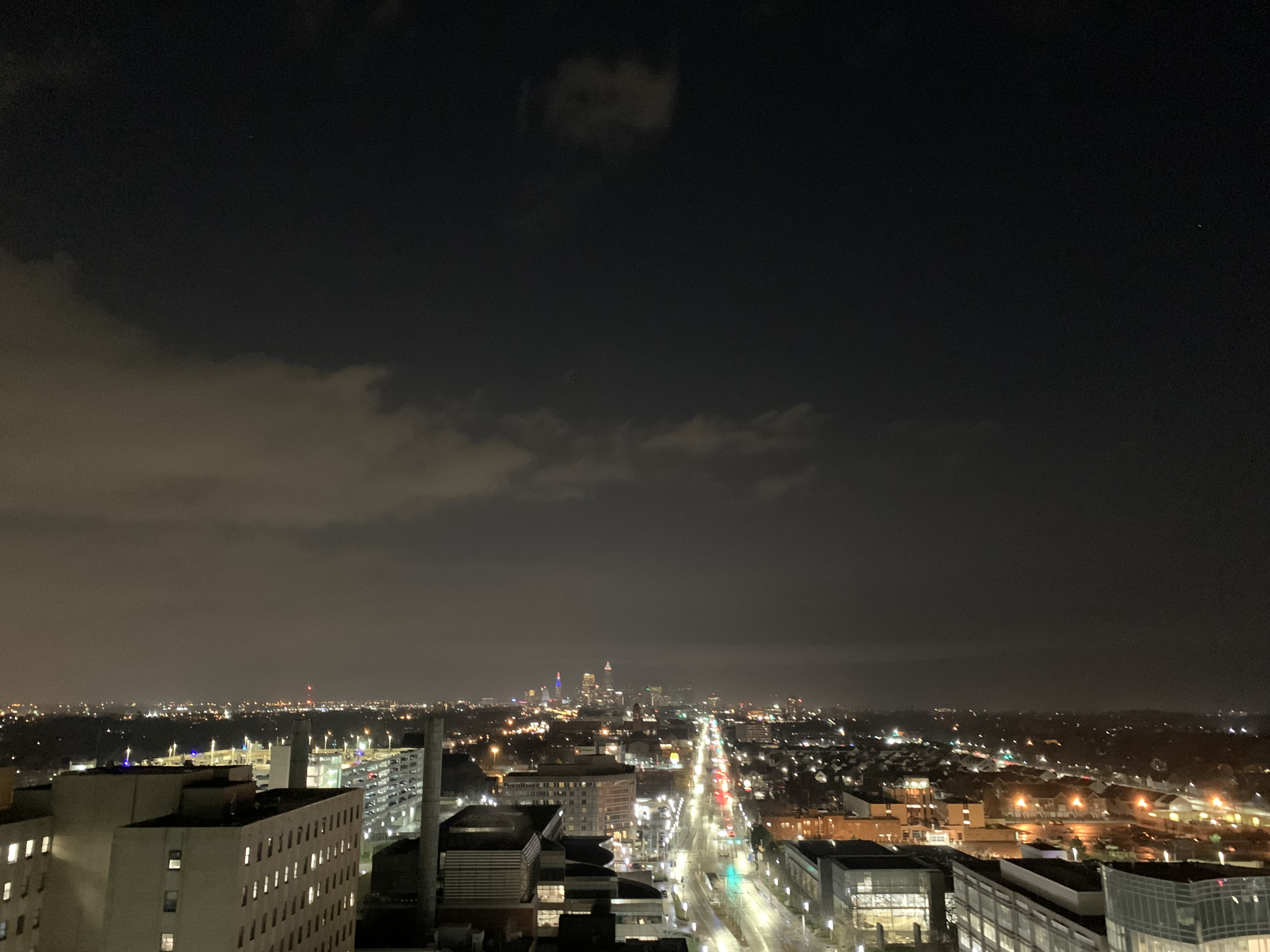
Cleveland skyline at night, observed from the roof of the Cleveland Clinic main campus

By 1960, multiple factors ultimately coalesced into Hough becoming a poor, majority African American community. The Second Great Migration and slum clearance in Cedar-Central created a mass influx of black people into Hough. This was exacerbated by other city planning projects aimed with clearing blight, including freeway construction through communities like Central and Downtown Cleveland. From 1957 to 1962, the city's University-Euclid urban renewal project demolished houses in Eastern Hough without creating enough new homes to compensate. A lack of a properly enforced housing code led Hough to become extremely overcrowded, as landlords continued to create multi-family housing out of large single-family homes. Blockbusting as a result of the increase in African Americans led to panic selling and white flight to the suburbs.

The massive population boom weighed on the school system, leading to the city to not only create two half day groups to attend schools but also to introduce busing to white neighborhoods like Murray Hill. The latter was a controversial practice that led to racial violence against Black students from Hough and Glenville.

In 1966, just months before the Hough Riots, the Cleveland Press described Hough as a “powder keg,” citing racial tensions akin to the Watts Uprising in Los Angeles during the previous summer. The neighborhood received national attention as a flashpoint of racial tension, when protest occurred for five days, or from July 18 to July 23.

=== Revitalization efforts ===
==== Stokes administration ====
The Hough Area Development Corporation (HADC) was founded by civil rights activist Reverend Deforest Brown in the wake of the 1966 uprising, using Cleveland: NOW! money from Carl Stokes' administration to fund housing and jobs in Hough. This included Martin Luther King Jr. Plaza, which was a mixed-use building that included housing and retail. The HADC additionally provided opportunities for a broader coalition of black business in the community, including job training. Both the HADC and the black nationalist group Operation Black Unity successfully created black-owned McDonald's franchises through a 1969 boycott. Although the franchises bought by the HADC failed to make enough money by the mid-1970s, the effort was highly influential on inner-city McDonald's and black ownership in said communities.

Stokes additionally worked with another black nationalist group called Cleveland Pride in 1968 to plant sod as a symbolic means of making the neighborhood more attractive and hospitable.

==== 21st century ====
Hough has seen an increase of redevelopment, although it remains among the city's poorest neighborhoods. This includes the 2014 preservation of League Park, a $6.3 million effort that renovated the original diamond into an AstroTurf field and turned its ticket office into a Baseball Heritage Museum.

Today, Hough forms part of the city's 7th Ward and is represented by Councilwoman Stephanie Howse.

== Notable landmarks ==
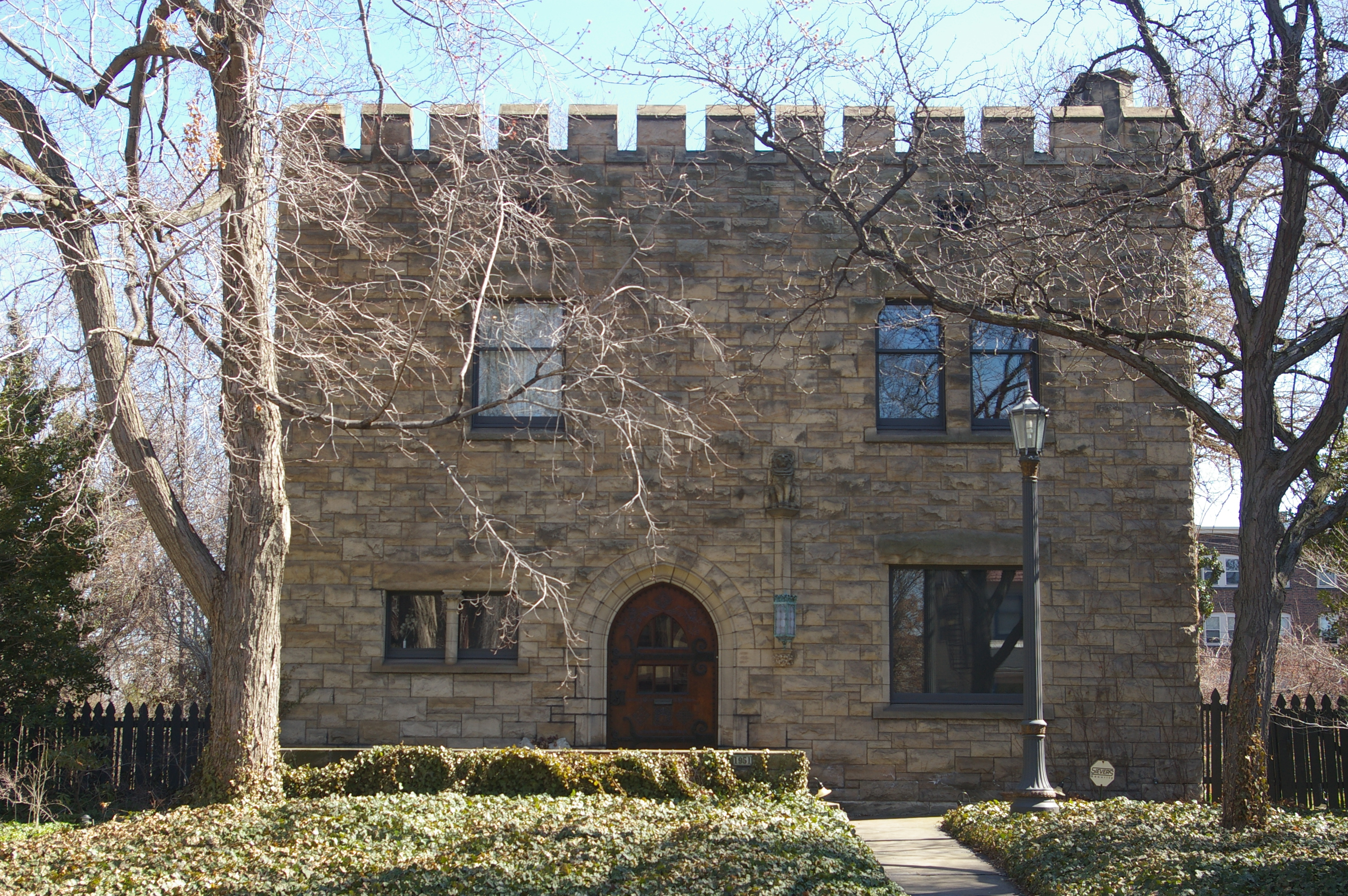
The Charles F. Schweinfurth House looks "fortress-like," and is in close proximity to the Cleveland Clinic's main campus.

Hough is home to some historical places, which include:

- Crawford-Tilden Apartments on East 84th Street and Crawford, on the southwest corner. Built in 1908, the apartments are in the National Register of Historic Places and are a Cleveland Designated Landmark.
- League Park on East 66th Street and Lexington Avenue, the original ballpark of the Cleveland Spiders/Indians and the Negro League's Cleveland Buckeyes. While much of the stadium was demolished in the 1950s, the diamond is now a part of a public park.
- The East 89th Street Historic District is a small residential sect between Chester and Hough Avenue and is home to colonial revival housing indicative of the affluent residents that lived in Hough at the turn of the century.
- The Charles F. Schweinfurth Residence close to the corner of Chester and East 75th Street was the home of the prominent Cleveland architect. Originally built for a member of the Vanderbilt family, the structure resembles a castle. After Schweinfurth's death, the house became a funeral home from 1930 to 1970, where it was then bought out and preserved in a larger 1970s attempt to revitalize the area.

Historical population
Census	Pop.	Note	%±
1940	64,800		—
1950	65,694		1.4%
1960	71,575		9.0%
1970	45,487		−36.4%
1980	25,330		−44.3%
1990	19,715		−22.2%
2000	16,359		−17.0%
2010	11,475		−29.9%
2020	10,755		−6.3%
