= The Toledo News-Bee =

Newspaper in Ohio, United States

The Toledo News Bee
- Type: Daily newspaper
- Format: Broadsheet
- Owner: Scripps-Howard
- Founded: 1903
- Ceased publication: August 2, 1938
- Headquarters: Toledo, Ohio, United States

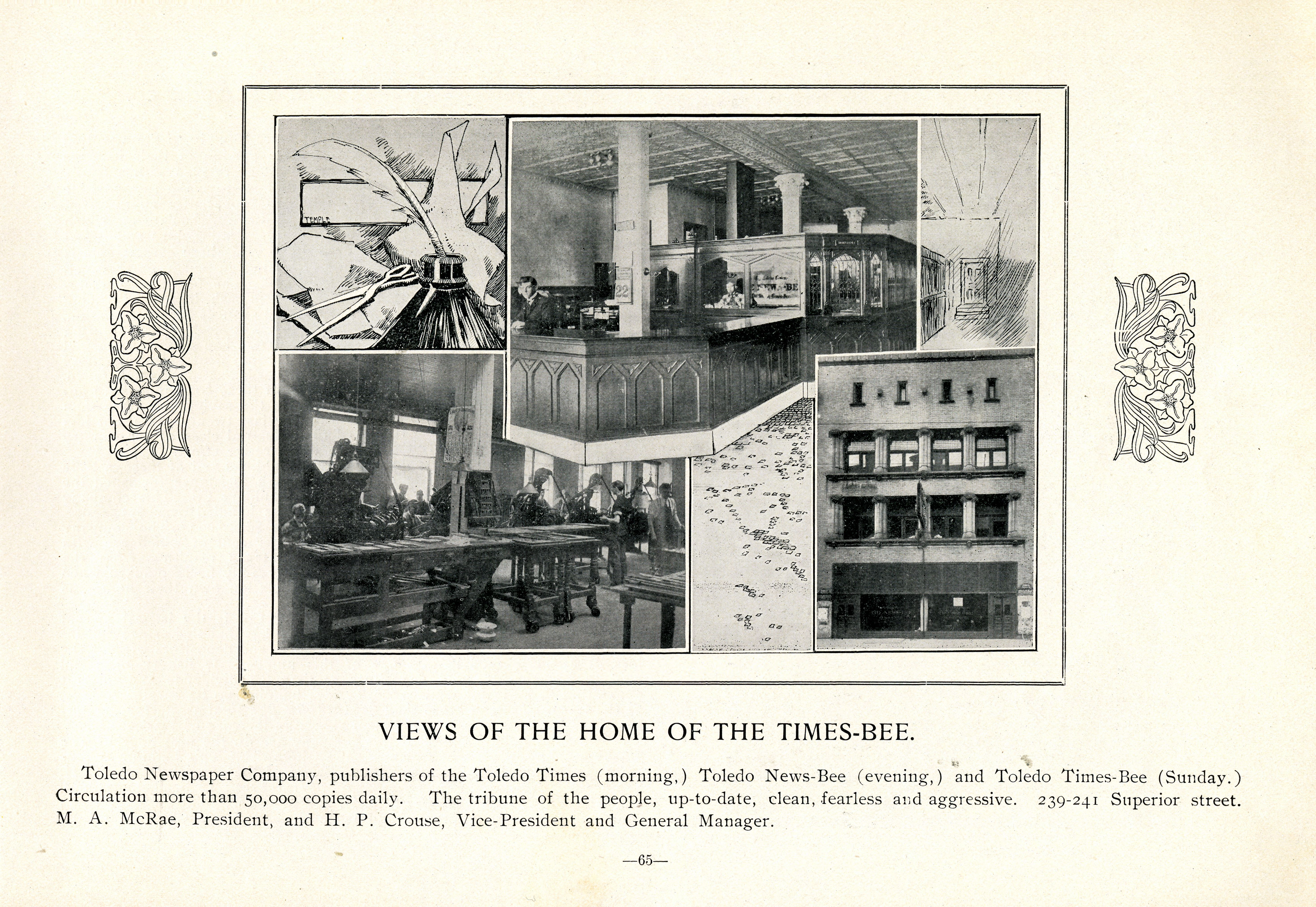
Advertisement for the Toledo Newspaper Company in the 1905 "Year book : photo flashes showing Toledo's phenomenal progress, thriving industries and wonderful resources"

The Toledo News Bee is a defunct newspaper that served Toledo, Ohio, and much of northwestern Ohio in the early part of the 20th century. It was formed from the 1903 merger of The Toledo News and The Toledo Bee, and was published until August 2, 1938, when it was purchased by The Toledo Blade for USD787,000. It was published by the Scripps-McRae group, which became later known as Scripps-Howard, from 1903, when it purchased the News, the Bee and The Toledo Times, until its demise.

Hall of Fame baseball player Addie Joss served as its Sunday sports editor and as a columnist. He proved so popular with readers that the paper's sales increased dramatically and a special phone line was installed in his office to allow readers to contact him directly.

The Toledo Bee was owned and run by the Cochrane Brothers. Negley Cochrane, owner, hired his 5 younger Brothers; Witt, Tom, George, Robert and Philip (P.D.) The 5 younger brothers went on to create the Witt Cochrane ad agency in Chicago and later created Independent Moving Pictures (IMP) the predecessor to Universal Pictures, and later Universal, alongside Carl Laemmle.
