= Woodland, Dodge County, Wisconsin =

Woodland, Wisconsin
- Unincorporated community
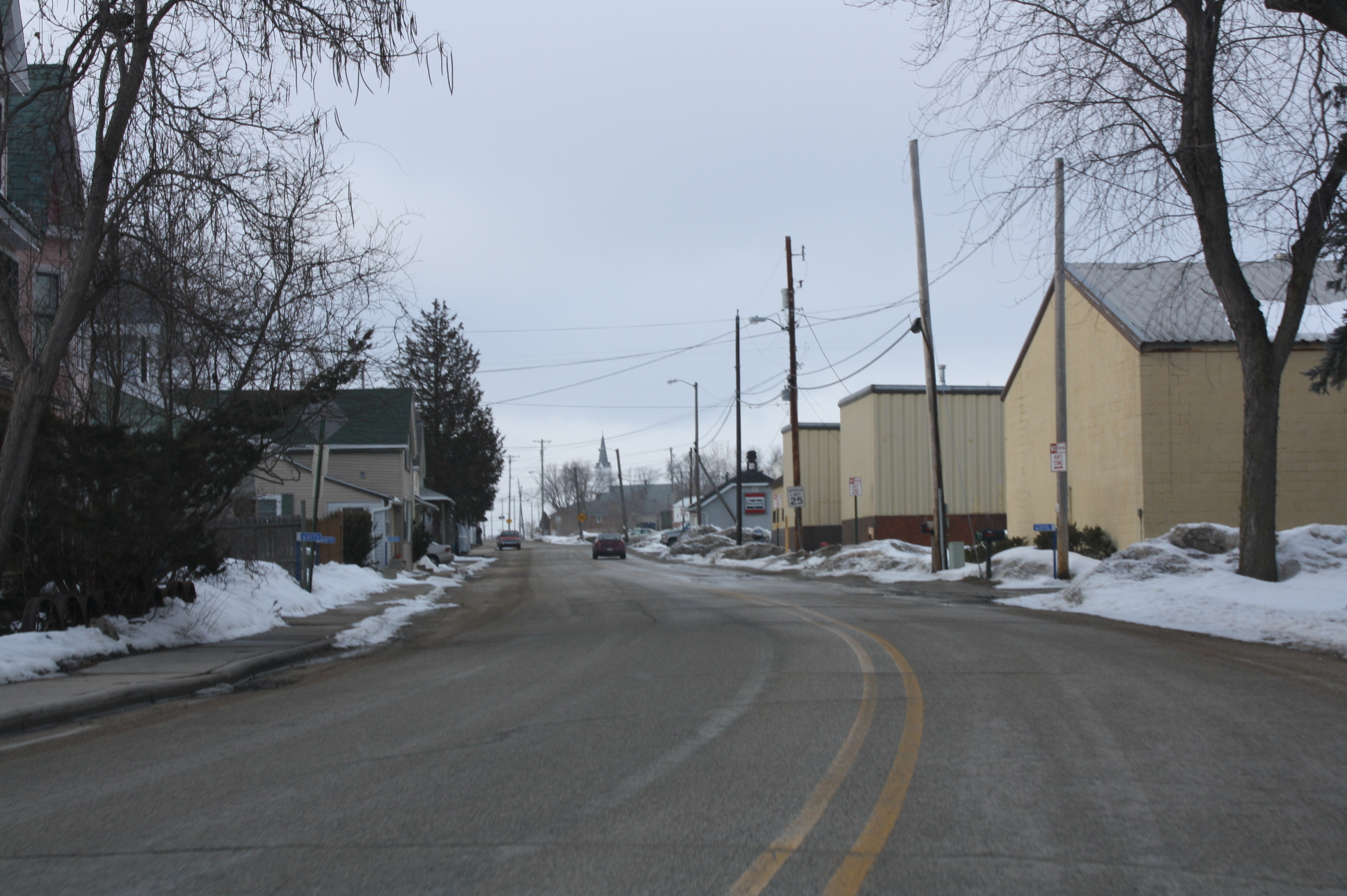
- Downtown Woodland

- Location within Wisconsin
- Coordinates: 43°22′13″N 88°31′07″W
- Country: United States
- State: Wisconsin
- County: Dodge
- Towns: Herman; Rubicon
- Time zone: UTC-6 (Central (CST))
  - Summer (DST): UTC-5 (CDT)
- ZIP code: 53099

Woodland is an unincorporated community located in the towns of Herman and Rubicon, in Dodge County, Wisconsin, United States. It is located at the intersection of Wisconsin Highway 67 and County highway WS.

== Notable people ==
- Addie Joss, baseball player, was born in Woodland.

== Images ==
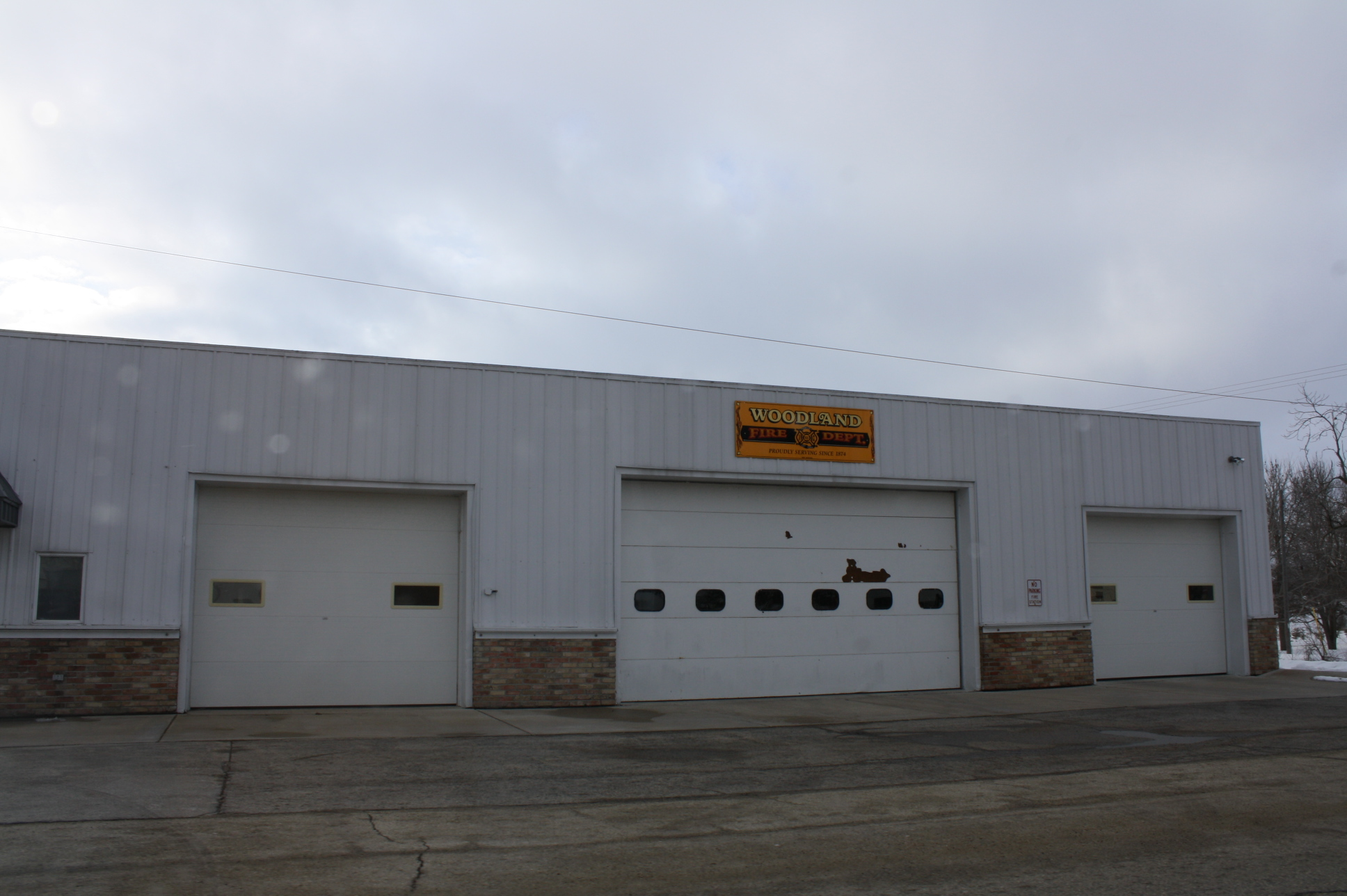
Woodland's fire station

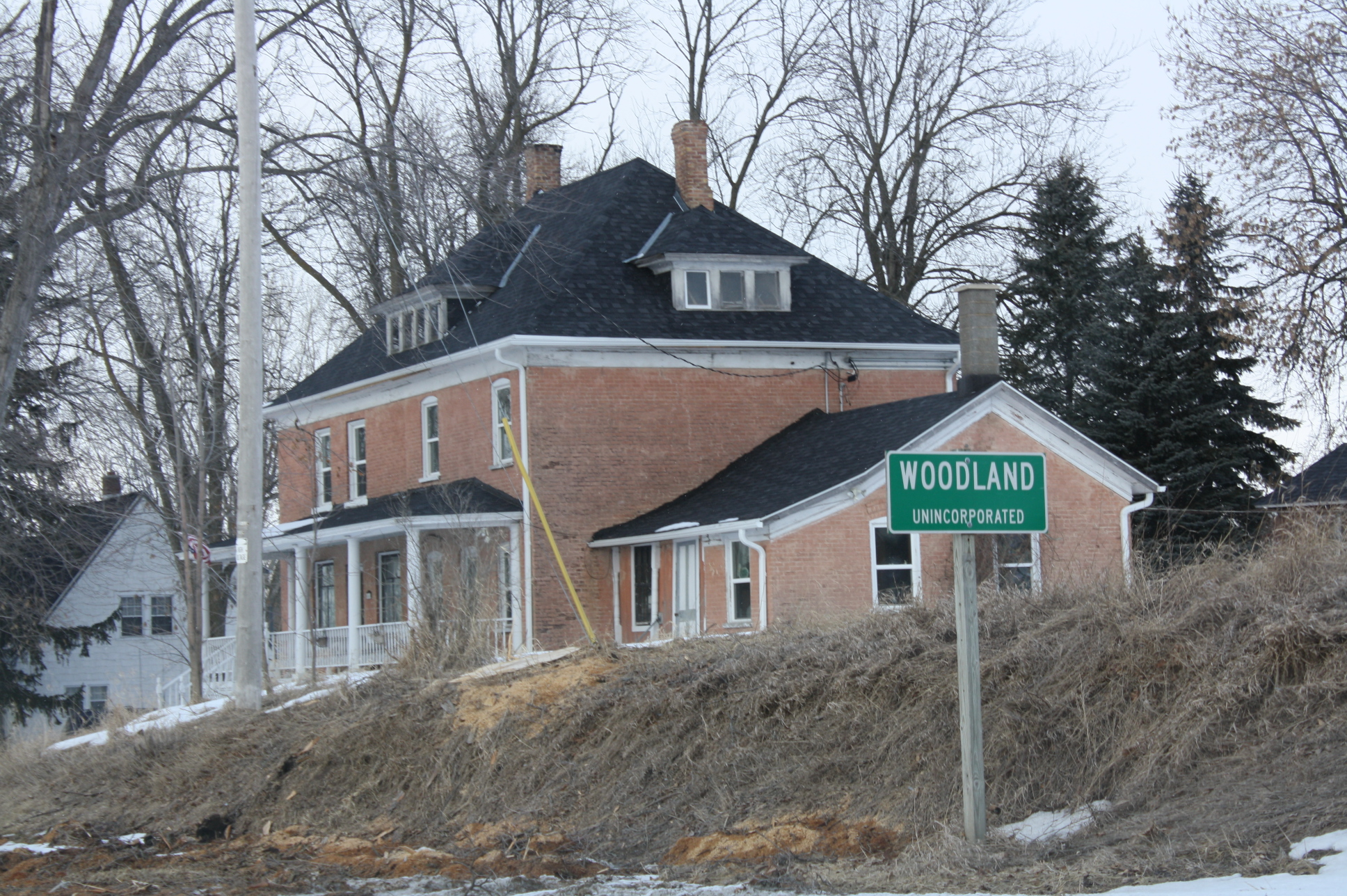
Looking north at Woodland's sign

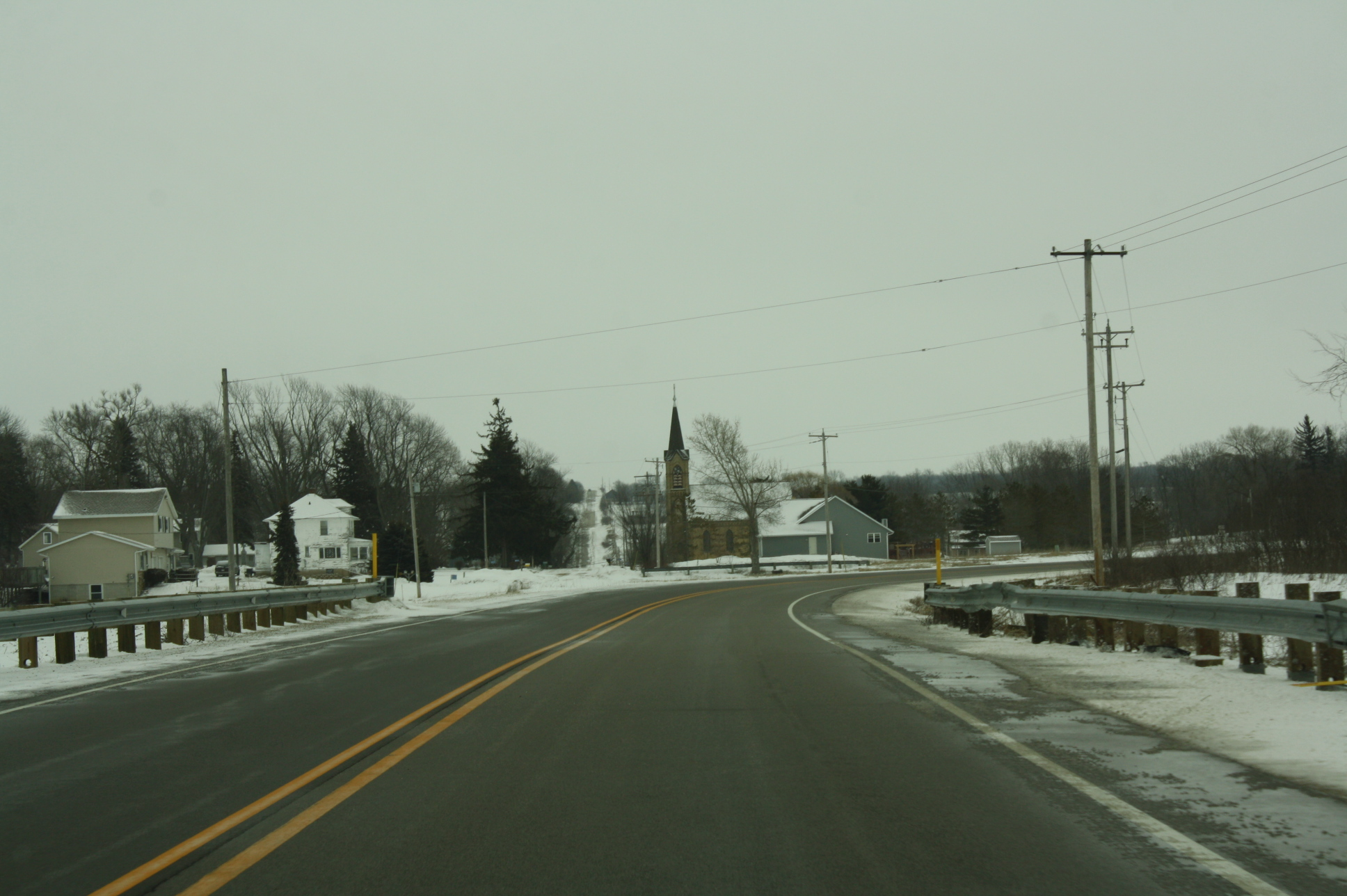
View looking south

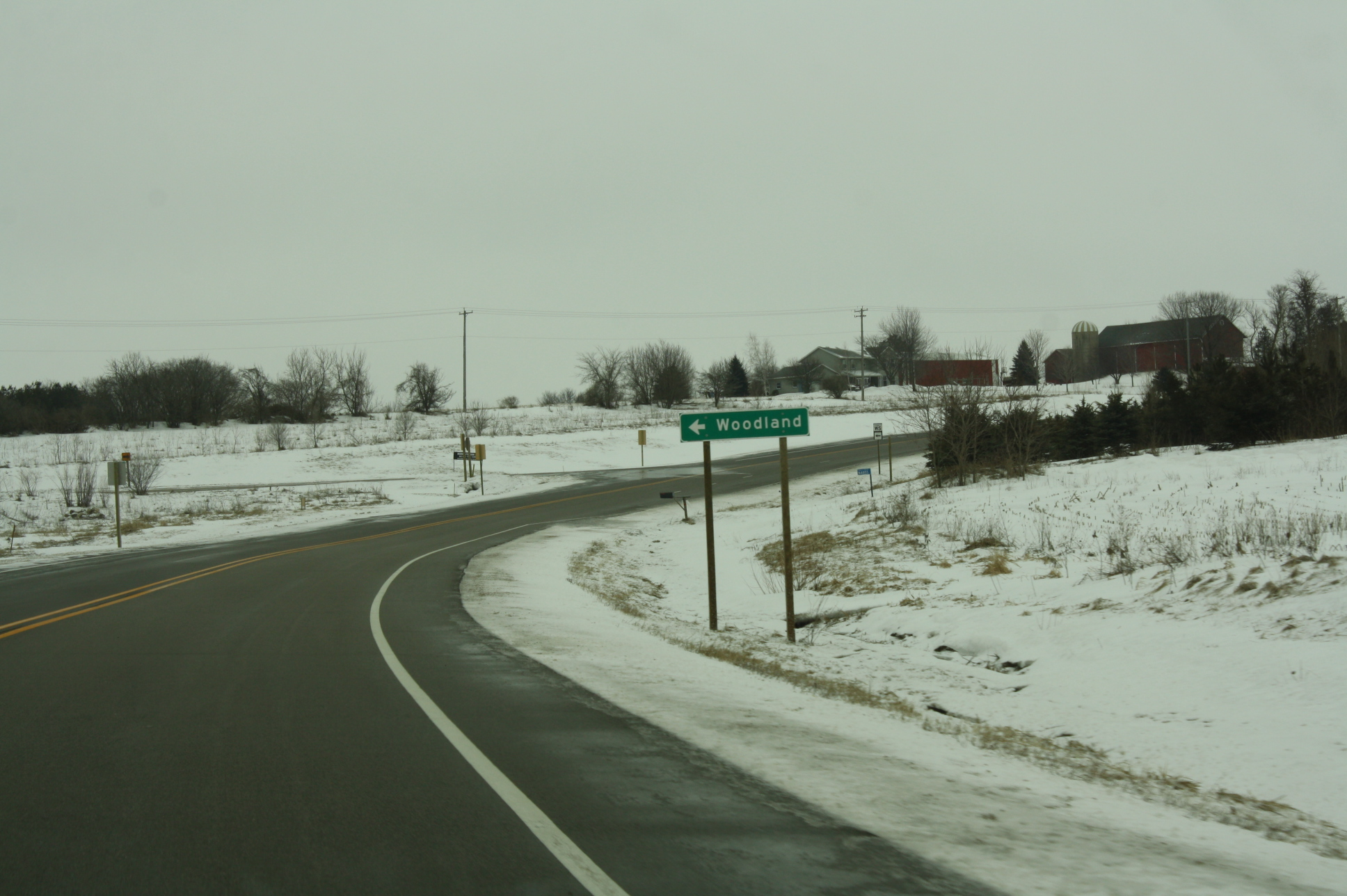
Looking south at Woodland's sign on WIS67
