= Addie Joss' perfect game =

1908 baseball game in Ohio, U.S.

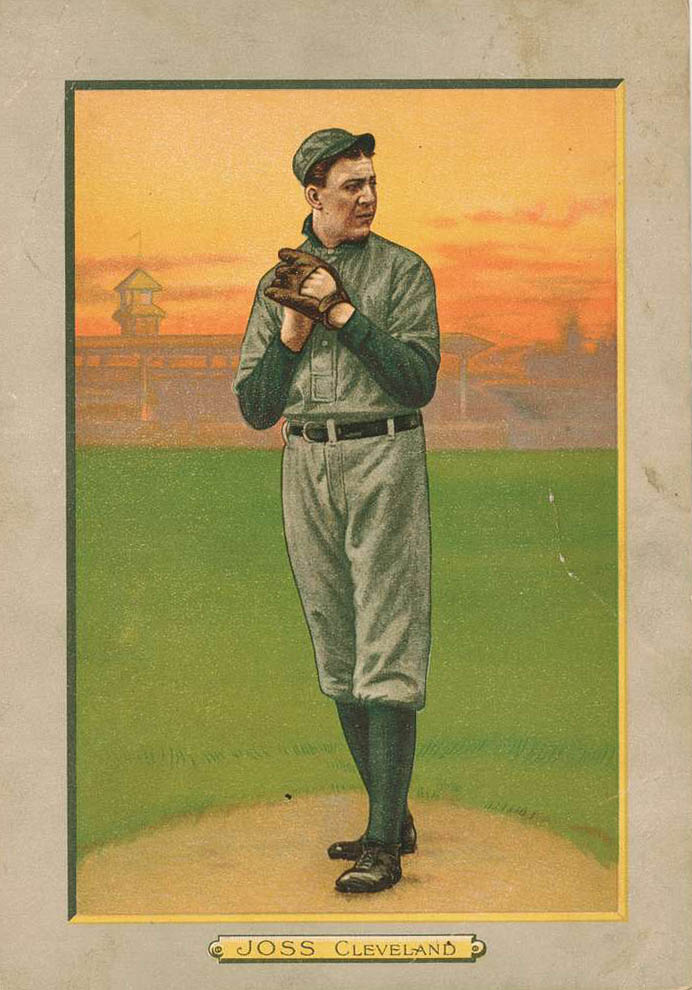
- Addie Joss threw the 4th perfect game in MLB history on October 2, 1908.
Chicago White Sox	Cleveland Naps
0	1
	1	2	3	4	5	6	7	8	9	R	H	E
Chicago White Sox	0	0	0	0	0	0	0	0	0	0	0	2
Cleveland Naps	0	0	1	0	0	0	0	0	-	1	4	0
- Date: October 2, 1908
- Venue: League Park
- City: Cleveland, Ohio
- Managers: Fielder Jones (Chicago White Sox); Nap Lajoie (Cleveland Naps)
- Umpires: HP: Tommy Connolly; 1B: Silk O'Loughlin; 2B: (none); 3B: (none)
- Attendance: 10,598

On October 2, 1908, Addie Joss pitched a perfect game, the fourth in Major League Baseball (MLB) history, the second in American League history, and the second since the beginning of the modern era (1900). He threw it at League Park, in Cleveland, Ohio.

Joss's three strikeouts are the fewest recorded in a modern era perfect game and the second-fewest in a perfect game in MLB history, trailing only the two strikeouts recorded by John Montgomery Ward in his 1880 perfect game.

== Background ==
The Detroit Tigers, Chicago White Sox, and Joss's Cleveland Naps were engaged in a race for the post-season at the time of the game, with the Tigers seeking their second straight pennant, the White Sox trying to win their second in three years, and the Naps looking for their first. Three games remained in the regular season and the Naps were a half-game behind the Detroit Tigers as they headed into a match-up against the Chicago White Sox, who trailed the Naps by one game. Game attendance was announced at 10,598.

== The game ==
The Naps faced future Hall of Fame pitcher Ed Walsh and recorded four hits; they were struck out by Walsh 15 times. The Naps' Joe Birmingham scored the team's only run, which came in the third inning. In the ninth inning, Joss retired the first two batters, then faced pinch hitter John Anderson. Anderson hit a line drive that would have resulted in a double had it not gone foul. He then hit a ball to Naps third baseman Bill Bradley which Bradley bobbled before throwing to first baseman George Stovall. Stovall dug the ball out of the ground to preserve the Naps' 1–0 lead. Joss's catcher in the game was the much traveled Jay Clarke.

== Aftermath ==
With the win, Joss recorded a perfect game, the second in American League history. He accomplished the feat with just 74 pitches, the lowest known pitch count ever achieved in a perfect game. Fans swarmed the field after the win.

The perfect game was the first of two no-hitters Joss pitched during his career. He no-hit the White Sox a second time on April 20, 1910, also by a 1–0 score. He was the only pitcher to throw two no-hitters against the same team until San Francisco Giant Tim Lincecum no-hit the San Diego Padres on July 13, 2013, and June 25, 2014.

== Game statistics ==
October 2, 1908, League Park, Cleveland, Ohio

Team	1	2	3	4	5	6	7	8	9	R	H	E
Chicago White Sox (85–63)	0	0	0	0	0	0	0	0	0	0	0	1
Cleveland Naps (88–62)	0	0	1	0	0	0	0	0	–	1	4	0
WP: Addie Joss (24–11) LP: Ed Walsh (39–15)

=== Box score ===
Chicago box score
Player	AB	R	H	RBI
Ed Hahn, RF	3	0	0	0
Fielder Jones, CF	3	0	0	0
Frank Isbell, 1B	3	0	0	0
Patsy Dougherty, LF	3	0	0	0
George Davis, 2B	3	0	0	0
Freddy Parent, SS	3	0	0	0
Ossee Schreckengost, C	2	0	0	0
Al Shaw, C	0	0	0	0
Doc White, PH	1	0	0	0
Lee Tannehill, 3B	2	0	0	0
Jiggs Donahue, PH	1	0	0	0
Ed Walsh, P	2	0	0	0
John Anderson, PH	1	0	0	0
Totals	27	0	0	0

Chicago	IP	H	R	ER	BB	SO
Ed Walsh (L, 39–15)	8	4	1	0	1	15
Totals	8	4	1	0	1	15

Cleveland box score
Player	AB	R	H	RBI
Wilbur Good, RF	4	0	0	0
Bill Bradley, 3B	4	0	0	0
Bill Hinchman, LF	3	0	0	0
Nap Lajoie, 2B	3	0	1	0
George Stovall, 1B	3	0	0	0
Nig Clarke, C	3	0	0	0
Joe Birmingham, CF	3	1	2	0
George Perring, SS	2	0	1	0
Addie Joss, P	3	0	0	0
Totals	28	1	4	0

Cleveland	IP	H	R	ER	BB	SO
Addie Joss (W, 24–11)	9	0	0	0	0	3
Totals	9	0	0	0	0	3
