= Crawford-Tilden Apartments =

- U.S. National Register of Historic Places
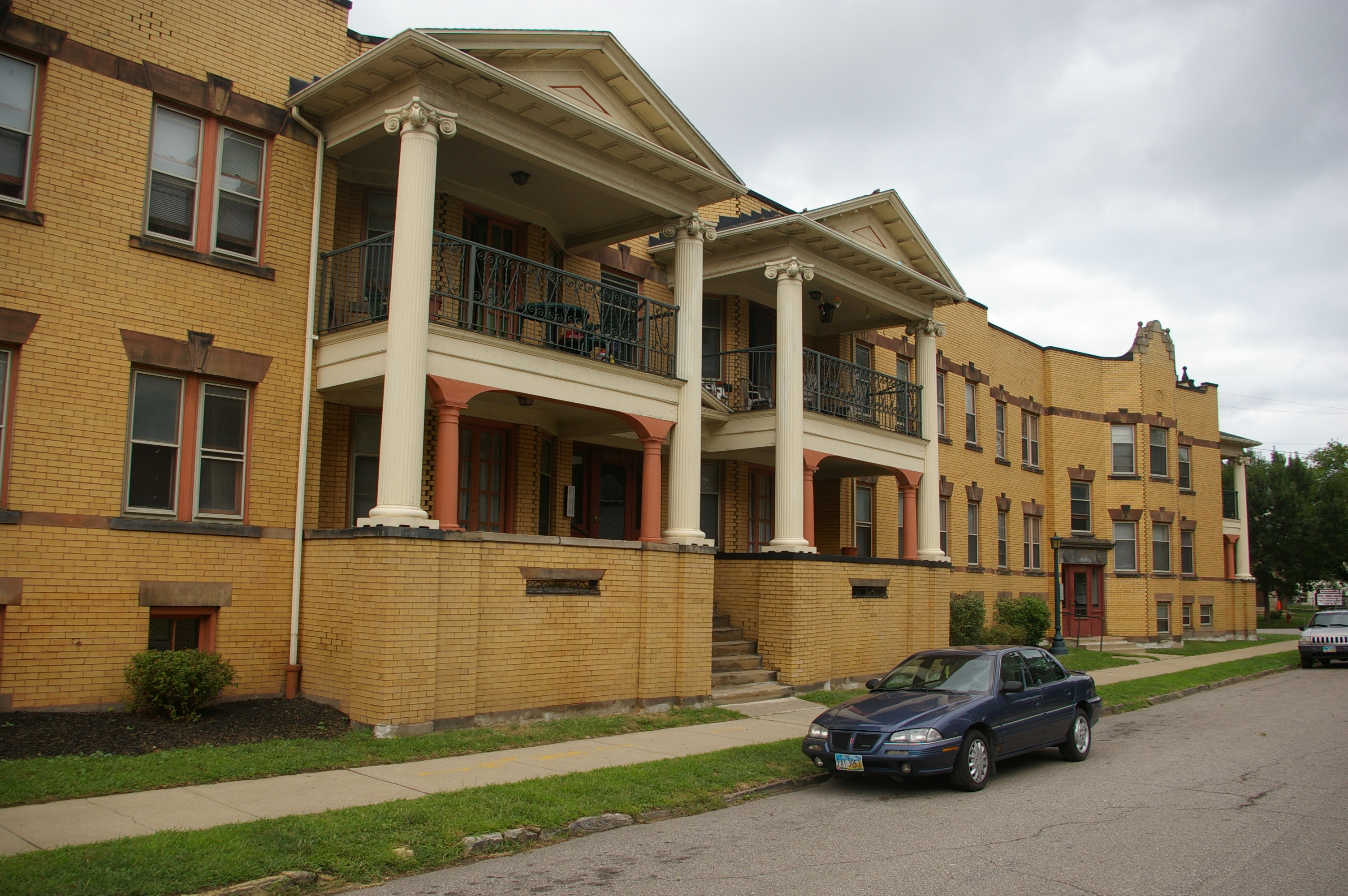
- Eastern side, facing 84th Street

- Location within Cleveland Location within Ohio Location within the United States
- Location: 1831-1843 Crawford Rd. and 1878-1888 E. 84th St., Cleveland, Ohio
- Coordinates: 41°30′25″N 81°37′45″W
- Area: 1 acre (0.40 ha)
- Built: 1908
- Architect: Burt Corning; Albert Dudley
- NRHP reference No.: 78002038
- Added to NRHP: March 21, 1978

The Crawford-Tilden Apartments are an apartment building on the eastern side of the city of Cleveland, Ohio, United States. Built to fit an unusual piece of land, it has been named an historic site.

Constructed in 1908, the Crawford-Tilden Apartments were built according to a design by Burt Corning, an Irishman who was one of Cleveland's premier architects in the early twentieth century. The structure's exterior is brick with elements of stone and iron, including architectural elements such as pinnacles on the roof's parapet and bay windows along the walls in many locations. Its plan is shaped like the letter "V" culminating with a tip one bay wide; the tip includes such stylistic elements as Ionic columns and a pediment. Numerous details were included in the construction of each of the building's twenty apartments, none of which have experienced substantial change since their construction more than a century ago.

Crawford-Tilden has been designated a landmark by the city of Cleveland, and in 1978 the complex was listed on the National Register of Historic Places. It qualified for federal designation because of its architecture: it is among the best works of one of the most prominent architects in Cleveland's history, it prefigures the architectural styles of the Progressive Era, and it is one of the area's earliest garden apartment complexes. Despite its historic status, the building decayed near the end of the twentieth century, but it has seen new life: in 1997, the Ohio SHPO presented one of its annual Preservation Merit Awards to the city of Cleveland in general, the municipal Department of Community Development, and to a related foundation, as the three had collaborated to restore the property.
