= League Park =

Former baseball park in Cleveland, Ohio, United States (1891-1946)

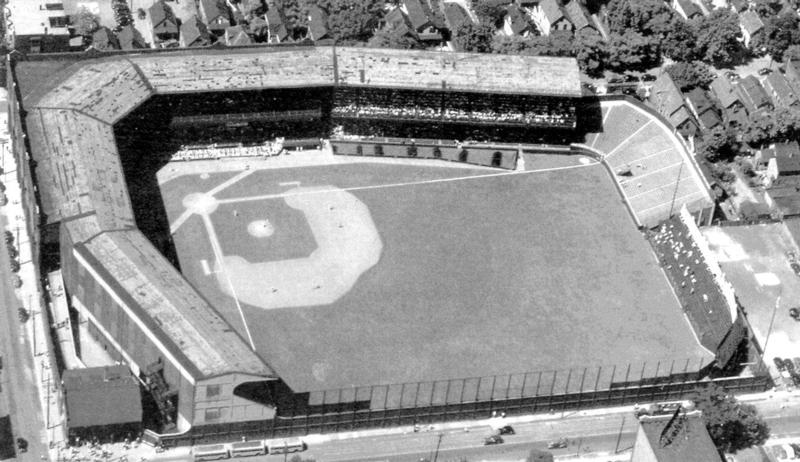
- League Park from the air
- Interactive map of League Park
- Former names: Dunn Field (1921–1927)
- Location: East 66th Street & Lexington Ave. Cleveland, Ohio, United States
- Coordinates: 41°30′41″N 81°38′39″W
- Capacity: 9,000 (1891); 21,414 (1910); 22,500 (final)
- Surface: Grass
- Field size: Left field – 375 ft (114 m); Left-center – 415 ft (127 m); Deep center – 460 ft (140 m); Center field – 420 ft (128 m); Right-center – 340 ft (104 m); Right field – 290 ft (88 m)

Construction
- Groundbreaking: 1891
- Opened: May 1, 1891
- Renovated: April 21, 1910
- Closed: September 21, 1946
- Demolished: 1951
- Architect: Osborn Engineering Company (1910)

Tenants
- Cleveland Spiders (NL) 1891–1899; Cleveland Lake Shores (WL) 1900; Cleveland Indians (MLB) 1901–1932, 1934–1946; Cleveland Bearcats / Spiders (AA) 1914–1915; Cleveland Red Sox (NNL II) 1934; Cleveland Bears (NAL) 1939–1940; Cleveland Buckeyes (NAL) 1942–1950 Cleveland Tigers (OL/NFL) 1916–1922; Cleveland Indians/Bulldogs (NFL) 1924–1927; Cleveland Rams (NFL) 1937, 1942, 1944–1945; Western Reserve Red Cats (NCAA) 1929–1932, 1934–1941, 1947–1949
- League Park
- U.S. National Register of Historic Places
- Location within Cleveland Location within Ohio Location within the United States
- Location: Lexington Ave. and E. 66th St., Cleveland, Ohio
- Coordinates: 41°30′42″N 81°38′39″W
- Area: 1 acre (0.40 ha)
- Built: 1891, 1909–1910
- Architect: Charles S. Schneider
- NRHP reference No.: 79001808
- Added to NRHP: August 8, 1979

League Park was a baseball park located in Cleveland, Ohio, United States. It was situated at the northeast corner of Dunham Street (now known as East 66th Street) and Lexington Avenue in the Hough neighborhood. It was built in 1891 as a wood structure and rebuilt using concrete and steel in 1910. The park was home to a number of professional sports teams, most notably the Cleveland Indians of Major League Baseball. League Park was first home to the Cleveland Spiders of the National League from 1891 to 1899 and of the Cleveland Lake Shores of the Western League, the minor league predecessor to the Indians, in 1900. From 1914 to 1915, League Park also hosted the Cleveland Spiders of the minor league American Association. In the 1940s, the park was also the home field of the Cleveland Buckeyes of the Negro American League.

In addition to baseball, League Park was also used for American football, serving as the home field for several successive teams in the Ohio League and early National Football League (NFL) during the 1920s and 1930s, as well as for college football. Most notably, the Cleveland Rams of the NFL played at League Park in 1937 and for much of the early 1940s. Later in the 1940s, the Cleveland Browns used League Park as a practice field.

The Western Reserve Red Cats college football team from Western Reserve University played a majority of homes games at League Park from 1929 to 1941, and all home games after joining the Mid-American Conference from 1947 to 1949. Western Reserve played many of its major college football games at League Park, including against the Ohio State Buckeyes, Pittsburgh Panthers, West Virginia Mountaineers, and Cincinnati Bearcats. Western Reserve and Case Tech often showcased their annual Thanksgiving Day rivalry game against one another, as well as playing other Big Four Conference games against John Carroll and Baldwin-Wallace. The final football game played at League Park was a 30–0 victory by Western Reserve University over rival Case Tech on Nov 24, 1949.

Although Cleveland Stadium opened in 1932 and had a much larger seating capacity and better access by car, League Park continued to be used by the Indians through the 1946 season, mainly for weekday games. Weekend games, games expecting larger crowds, and night games were held at Cleveland Stadium. The ball field at League Park is still intact and used for baseball locally, yet most but not all of the League Park structure was demolished in 1951. Some venue remnants still remain, including the original ticket office built in 1909.

After extensive renovation, the site was rededicated on August 23, 2014, as the Baseball Heritage Museum and Fannie Lewis Community Park at League Park.

== History ==
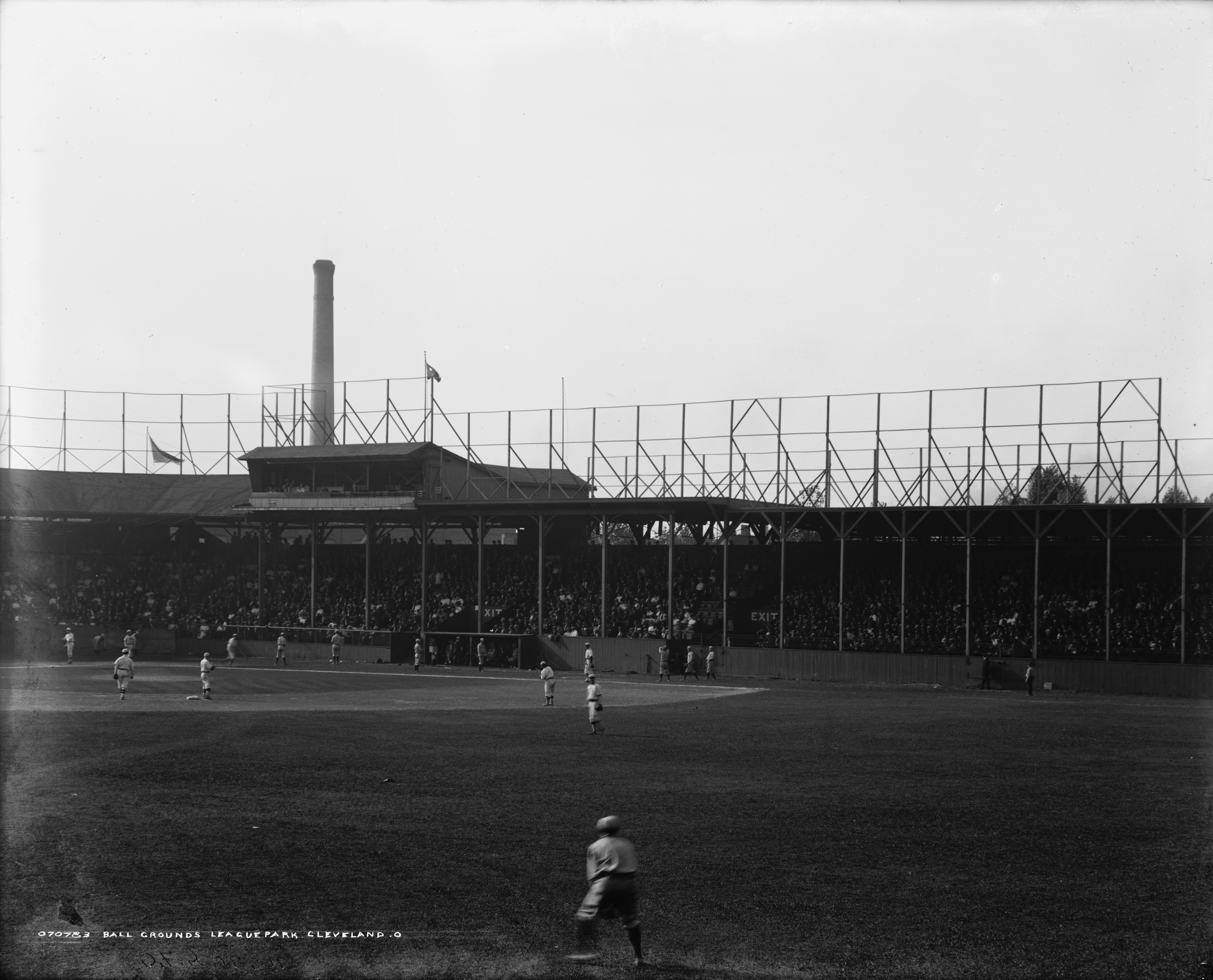
League Park, circa 1905

League Park was built for the Cleveland Spiders, who were founded in 1887 and played first in the American Association before joining the National League in 1889. Team owner Frank Robison chose the site for the new park, at the corner of Lexington Avenue and Dunham Street, later renamed East 66th Street, in Cleveland's Hough neighborhood, because it was along the streetcar line he owned. The park opened May 1, 1891, with 9,000 wooden seats, in a game against the Cincinnati Reds. The first pitch was made by Cy Young, and the Spiders won 12–3.

During their tenure, the Spiders finished as high as 2nd place in the NL in 1892, 1895, and 1896, and won the 1895 Temple Cup, an early version of the modern National League Championship Series, in 1895. During the 1899 season, however, the Spiders had most of their best players stripped from the roster and sent to St. Louis by their owners, who had purchased the St. Louis Browns that year. Consequently, Cleveland finished 20–134, and the Spiders season was so poor they drew only 6,088 fans for their entire home season—an average of only 145 per game—and were forced to play 112 of their 154 games on the road as the other NL teams deemed it pointless to travel to Cleveland's League Park, since their cut of the ticket revenue would not come close to covering their travel and hotel expenses.

The team was contracted by the National League after 1899, being replaced the next year by the Cleveland Lake Shores, then a minor league team in the American League. The American League declared itself a major league after the 1900 season and the Cleveland franchise, initially called the Blues, was a charter member for the 1901 season.

The park was rebuilt for the 1910 season as a concrete-and-steel stadium, one of two to open that year in the American League, the other being Comiskey Park. The new park seated over 18,000 people, more than double the seating capacity of its predecessor. It opened April 21, 1910, with a 5–0 loss to the Detroit Tigers in front of 18,832 fans in a game started by pitcher Cy Young.

During 1914 to 1915, the Toledo Mud Hens of the minor league American Association were temporarily moved to League Park, to discourage the Federal League from trying to place a franchise in Cleveland. During their two-year stay, they were initially known as the Bearcats, then the Spiders, reviving the old National League club's name.

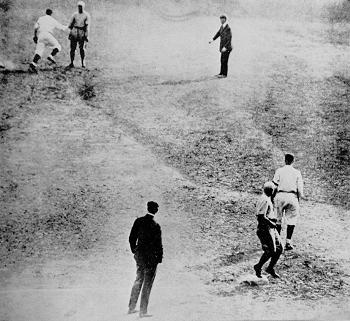
Game 5 of the 1920 World Series at League Park, with Bill Wambsganss tagging out Otto Miller for the final out of Wambsganss' historic unassisted triple play

The Indians hosted games four through seven of the 1920 World Series at League Park. The series, won by the Indians five games to two, was notable as the first championship in franchise history, as well as for game five, which featured the first grand slam in World Series history and the only unassisted triple play in postseason history.

As a prerequisite to buying the team, "Sunny" Jim Dunn, who had purchased the team in 1916, renamed the park Dunn Field in 1921. When Dunn died in 1922, his wife inherited the ballpark and the team. When Dunn's widow, by then known as Mrs. George Pross, sold the franchise in the early autumn of 1927 for $1 million to a group headed by Alva Bradley, the name reverted to the more prosaic "League Park" (there were a number of professional teams' parks generically called "league park" at the time). News writers continued to refer to the ballpark as Dunn Field sporadically for some time after the renaming.

From July 31, 1932, through the 1933 season, the Indians played at the new and far larger Cleveland Stadium. However, the players and fans complained about the huge outfield, which reduced the number of home runs. Moreover, as the Great Depression worsened, attendance at the stadium plummeted. After the 1933 season, the Indians exercised their escape clause in the lease at the stadium and returned to League Park for the 1934 season.

The Indians played all home games at League Park for the 1934 and 1935 seasons, and played one home game at Cleveland Stadium in 1936 as part of the Great Lakes Exposition. In 1937, the Indians began splitting their schedule between the two parks, playing Sunday and holiday games at the stadium during the summer and the remainder at League Park, adding selected important games to the stadium schedule in 1938. Lights were never installed at League Park, and thus no major league night games were played there. However, at least one professional night game was played on July 27, 1931, between the Homestead Grays and the House of David, who borrowed the portable lighting system used by the Kansas City Monarchs.

In 1940 and from 1942 on, the Indians played the majority of their home schedule at Cleveland Stadium, abandoning League Park entirely after the 1946 season. The final Indians game at League Park was played on Saturday, September 21, a 5–3 loss in 11 innings to the Detroit Tigers in front of 2,772 fans. League Park became the last stadium used in Major League Baseball never to install permanent lights.

The Indians continued to own League Park until March 1950 when they sold it to the city of Cleveland for $150,000. After the demise of the Cleveland Buckeyes of the Negro American League during the 1950 season, League Park was no longer used as a regular sports venue. Most of the structure was demolished in 1951 by the city to convert the facility for use by local amateur teams and recreation and to prevent any competition with Cleveland Stadium. The lower deck seating between first base and third base remained, as did the Indians' clubhouse under the third base stands. The Cleveland Browns began using League Park as a practice field in 1952, including the former clubhouse, until 1965. All of the remaining seating areas were removed in 1961 except for the area above the former clubhouse, which was finally torn down in 2002.

== Structure ==
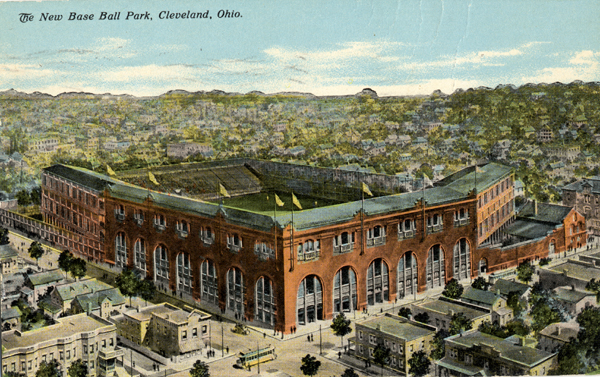
Postcard of League Park

When it originally opened in 1891, it had 9,000 wooden seats. A single deck grandstand was behind homeplate, a covered pavilion was along the first base line, and bleachers were located at various other places in the park. The ballpark was configured to fit into the Cleveland street grid, which contorted the dimensions into a rather odd rectangular shape by modern standards. The fence in left field was 385 feet (117 m), 460 feet (140 m) away in center, and 290 feet (88 m) down the right field foul line. Batters had to hit the ball over a 40-foot (12 m) fence to get a home run (by comparison, the Green Monster at Fenway Park is 37 feet (11 m) high).

It was essentially rebuilt prior to the 1910 season, with concrete and steel double-decker grandstands, expanding the seating capacity to 21,414. The design work was completed by Osborn Architects & Engineers, a local architecture firm that would go on to design several iconic ballparks over the next three years, including Comiskey Park, the Polo Grounds, Tiger Stadium, and Fenway Park. The front edges of the upper and lower decks were vertically aligned, bringing the up-front rows in the upper deck closer to the action, but those in back could not see much of foul territory.

The fence was reconfigured, bringing the left field fence in 10 feet closer (375 feet (114 m)) and center field fence in 40 feet (420 feet (130 m)); the right field fence remained at 290 feet (88 m).

Batters still had to surmount a 40-foot (12 m) fence to hit home runs. The fence in left field was only five feet tall, but batters had to hit the ball 375 feet (114 m) down the line to hit a home run, and it was fully 460 feet (140 m) to the scoreboard in the deepest part of center field. The diamond, situated in the northwest corner of the block, was slightly tilted counterclockwise, making right field not quite as easy a target as Baker Bowl's right field (which had a 60-foot (18 m) wall), for example.

On the eve of the 1920 World Series, with temporary seating built across center field.

== Modern League Park ==
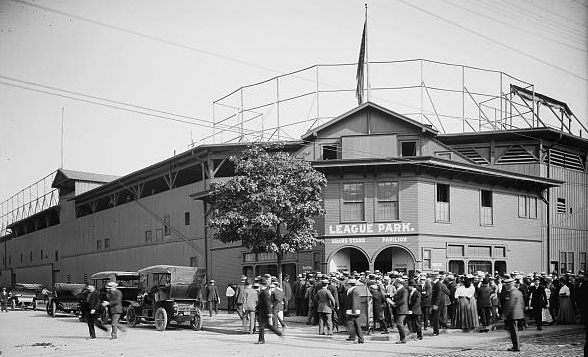
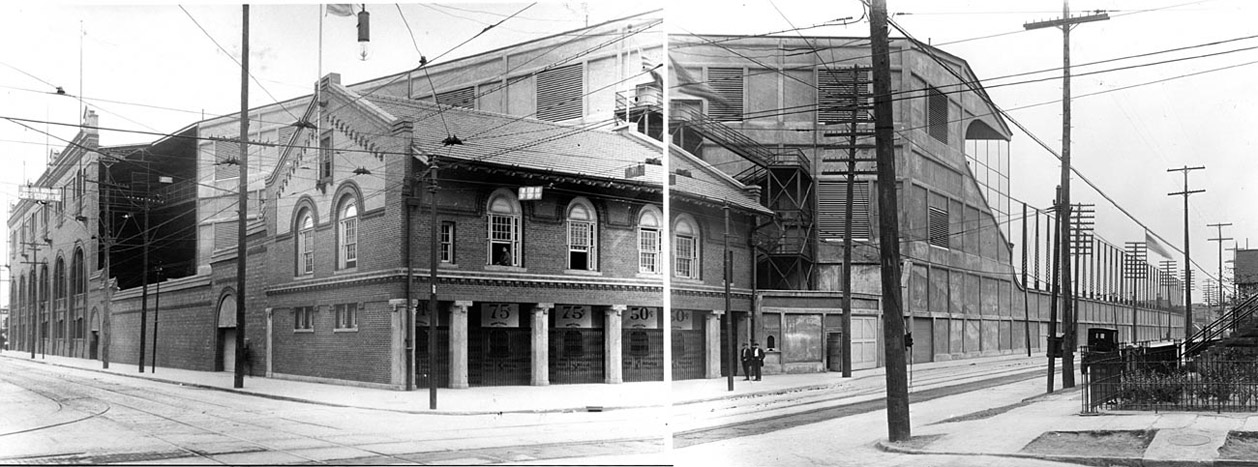

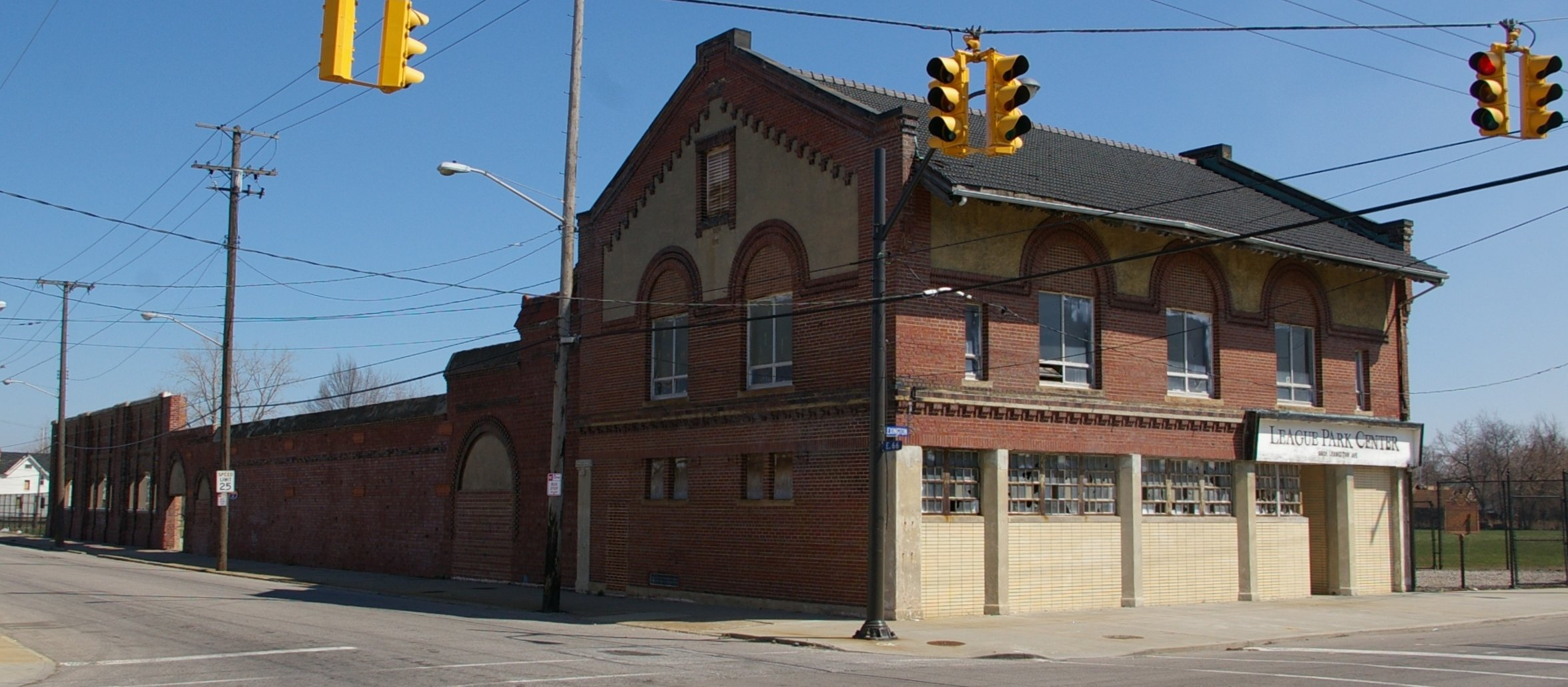
League Park circa 1905 (top), 1910 (middle), and in 2009 (bottom). The ticket house building from 1910 was renovated in 2014 to house the Baseball Heritage Museum.

Currently the site is a public park. A small section of the exterior brick facade (along the first-base side) still stands, as well as the old ticket office behind what was the right field corner. The last remnant of the grandstand, crumbling and presumably unsafe, was taken down in 2002 as part of a renovation process to the decaying playground. Local schools' youth teams still compete on the ball field.

On February 7, 2011, the Cleveland City Council approved a plan to restore the ticket house and remaining bleacher wall, as well as build a new diamond on the site of the old one (and with the same slightly counterclockwise tilt from the compass points). On October 27, 2012, city leaders including Mayor Frank G. Jackson and Councilman TJ Dow took part in the groundbreaking of the League Park restoration. The project included a museum, a restoration of the ball field, and a community park featuring pavilions and walking trails. The community park was dedicated in September 2013 as the Fannie M. Lewis Community Park at League Park. Lewis was a city councilwoman who encouraged League Park's restoration.

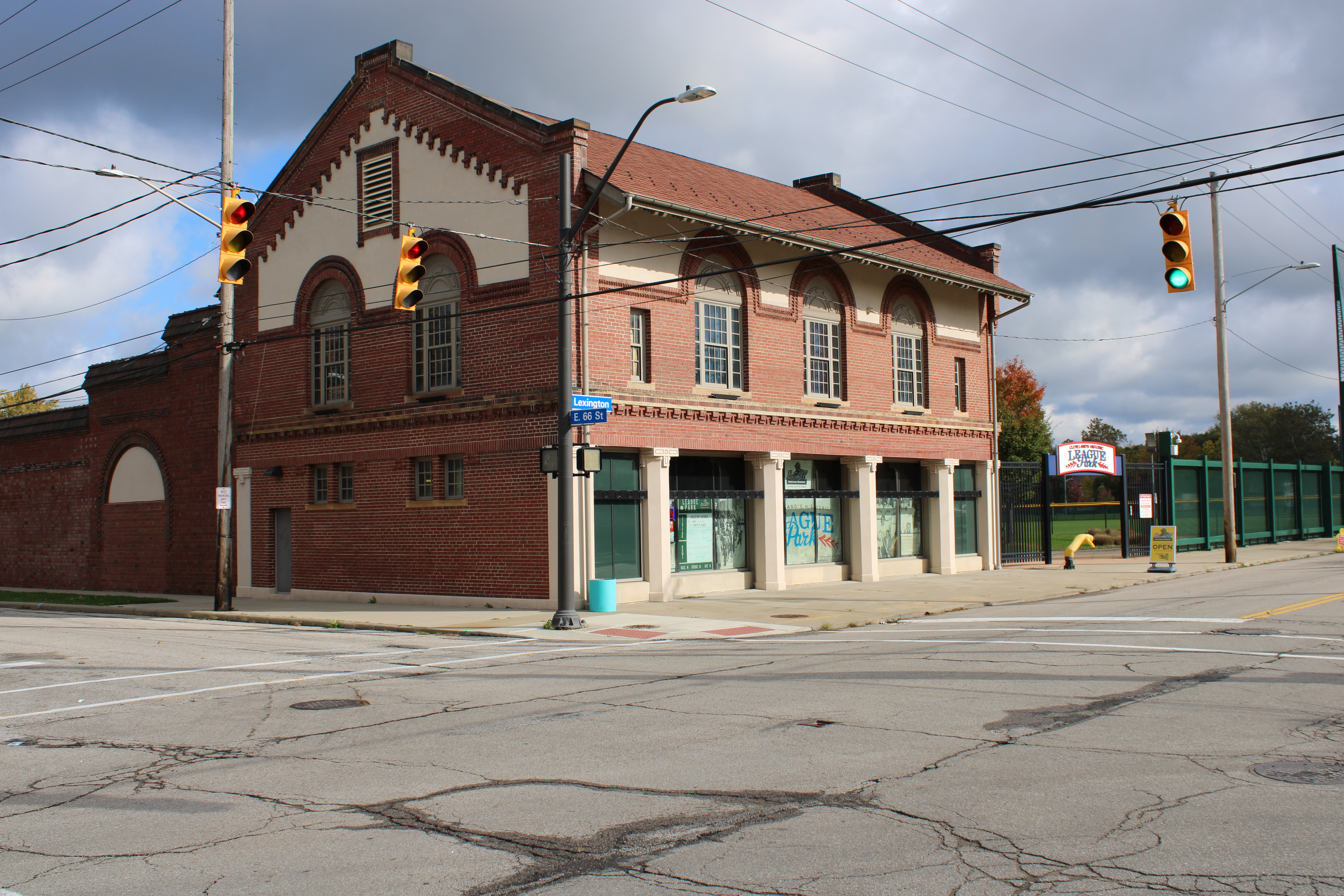
The ticket house building as the Baseball Heritage Museum in 2021.

Restoration was completed in 2014, and League Park reopened August 23 of that year. As part of the renovation, the Baseball Heritage Museum, housing artifacts from baseball history as well as many specifically from the history of League Park, was relocated from downtown Cleveland to the restored ticket house.

== Notable events ==
Historic events that took place at League Park include the following:

- May 1, 1891: The ballpark opened. Cy Young delivered the first pitch and the Spiders defeated the Cincinnati Reds, 12–3.
- October 17–19, 1892: The ballpark hosted the first three games of the first "split season" in the history of the National League. The opposing Boston Beaneaters eventually won the series over the Spiders.
- October 2,3 and 5, 1895: The ballpark hosted the first three games of that year's Temple Cup Series, a World Series precursor, the Spiders facing the Baltimore Orioles. Cleveland eventually clinched the series in Baltimore.
- October 8, 1896: The ballpark hosted the final game of that year's Temple Cup, a sweep by Baltimore, as well as Cleveland's final post-season appearance for the National League.

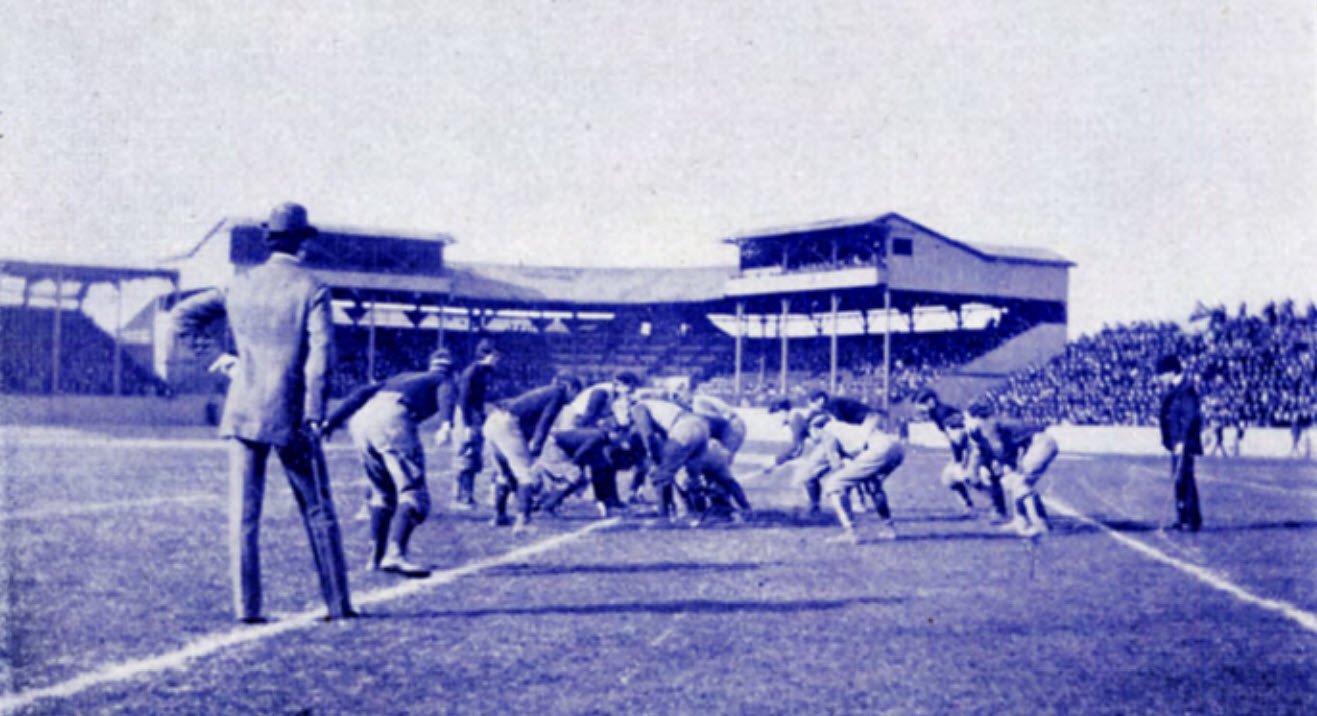
Thanksgiving Day college football game between Western Reserve and Case, 1896.

- November 26, 1896: The ballpark hosted its first college football game, seeing Case defeat Western Reserve, 12–10.
- August 30, 1899: Cleveland played its final National League home game at League Park in a season in which the team won only 20 games while losing a record 134.
- 1900: The new American League, nominally a minor league, returned professional baseball to Cleveland after the National League contracted following the 1899 season. First home game April 26.
- April 29, 1901: Cleveland's first home game in the American League after the league had declared itself a major league.
- October 2, 1907: The debut of female pitching sensation Alta Weiss.
- October 2, 1908: Addie Joss' perfect game, against the Chicago White Sox.
- July 24, 1911: The Addie Joss Benefit Game is played between Cleveland and a team of American League all-stars.
- October 10, 1920: Game 5 of the 1920 World Series against the Brooklyn Dodgers, includes several World Series "firsts":
  - In the bottom of the first inning, Cleveland right fielder Elmer Smith hit the first grand slam home run in the history of the World Series, over the high right field wall and screen.
  - In the bottom of the fourth inning, Cleveland pitcher Jim Bagby hit the first home run by a pitcher in a World Series game, into temporary bleachers built across the center field area.
  - In the top of the fifth inning, Cleveland second baseman Bill Wambsganss executed the only unassisted triple play in World Series history.
- October 12, 1920: The Cleveland Indians won their first World Series, winning Game 7, 3–0.
- August 11, 1929: Babe Ruth hit his 500th career home run, the first player to achieve that milestone.
- July 16, 1941: The final game of Joe DiMaggio's 56-game hitting streak. The streak was snapped the following night at Cleveland Stadium.
- 1945: The Cleveland Buckeyes won the 1945 Negro World Series.
- December 2, 1945: The Cleveland Rams played their last game at League Park, beating the Boston Yanks 20–7. On December 16, at Cleveland Stadium, the Rams beat the Washington Redskins 15–14 to win the NFL Championship in their last game before moving to Los Angeles the following month.
- September 13, 1946: The Boston Red Sox clinched the American League pennant, the game's only score coming on a first-inning home run by Ted Williams.
- September 21, 1946: The final MLB baseball game at League Park, a 5–3 loss to the Detroit Tigers. The Indians rounded out their 1946 home season with three games at Cleveland Stadium.
- October 23, 1948: Kent State Golden Flashes and Western Reserve Red Cats played to a 14–14 tie in Ohio's first televised intercollegiate football game.
- November 24, 1949: The final college football game played at League Park, a 30–0 victory by the Western Reserve Red Cats over rival Case Tech Rough Riders.

Events and tenants
Preceded by National League Park	Home of the Cleveland Spiders; 1891–1899	Succeeded by last ballpark
Preceded by first ballpark	Home of the Cleveland Indians; 1901–1946 (shared with Cleveland Stadium from 1932–1933 and 1936–1946)	Succeeded by Cleveland Stadium
Preceded by first stadium Cleveland Stadium	Home of the Cleveland Rams; 1936 (AFL); 1937–1942; 1944–1945 (NFL)	Succeeded by Shaw Stadium; Los Angeles Memorial Coliseum
