= List of Pacific Coast League champions =

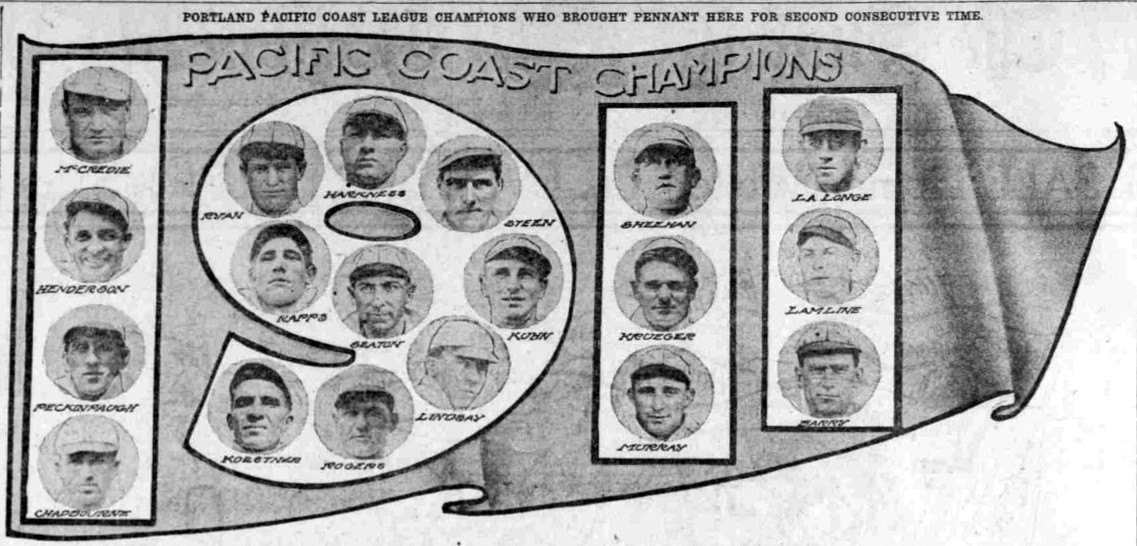
A pennant celebrating the 1911 Pacific Coast League champion Portland Beavers

The Pacific Coast League (PCL) is a Minor League Baseball league that operates in the United States at the Triple-A level, which is one grade below Major League Baseball. A champion has been determined at the end of each season since the league was formed in 1903.

Through 1927, champions were usually the regular-season pennant winners—the team with the best win–loss record at the conclusion of the regular season. From 1928 to 1954, postseason playoffs were the predominant method of determining champions. Participants from 1936 to 1954 were the four teams with the highest winning percentages. After a period of postseason dormancy, the playoffs returned in 1963 along with the advent of a divisional alignment. From 1963 to 1977, the winners of each of two divisions vied for the championship. The league operated using a split season format from 1978 to 1997, with the winners of each half facing off for the right to play for the PCL crown. From 1998 to 2020, the league was split into two conferences of two divisions each. The division winners within each conference met to determine conference champions, and those winners competed for the league championship. The 2021 winner was the team with the best regular-season record. In 2022, the league championship was determined by a single playoff game between the East and West division winners. Beginning with the 2023 season, the league adopted a split season format, in which the league championship is determined by a best-of-three playoff series between the winners of each half of the season, with the winner meeting the champion of the International League in the Triple-A National Championship Game.

The San Francisco Seals won 14 Pacific Coast League championships, more than any other team, followed by the Los Angeles Angels (12) and the Albuquerque Dukes and Portland Beavers (8). Among active PCL franchises, the Tacoma Rainiers have seven championships, the most of all teams, followed by the Sacramento River Cats (5) and the Oklahoma City Comets (4).

== History ==
=== Pre-playoff era (1903–1927) ===
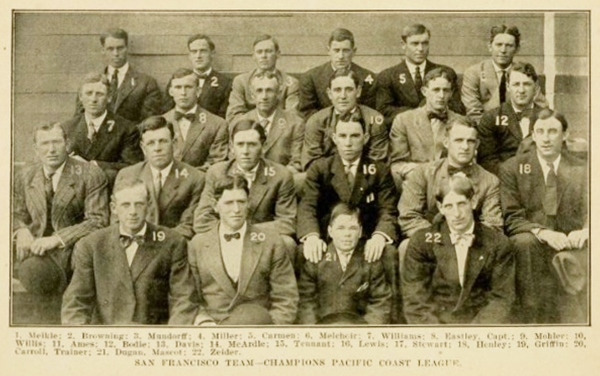
The San Francisco Seals (shown in 1909) won 14 championships, more than any other team.

The Pacific Coast League was founded in 1903. A league champion has been determined at the end of each season. With few exceptions, champions from 1903 to 1927 were simply the regular-season pennant winners—the team with the best win–loss record at the conclusion of the regular championship season. The first league champions were the Los Angeles Angels, who won by 27 1/2 games over the Sacramento Senators in 1903.

The 1904 and 1905 seasons were contested as split seasons. Under this format, the schedule was split into two parts. The team with the best record at the end of the first season won the first pennant. Standings were then reset so that all clubs had clean records to begin the second season. If the first season winner also won the second season, they were declared the league champion. If a different team won the second season, the two winners would meet in a playoff series to determine the champion. The Tacoma Tigers, winners of the first half of the 1904 season, won the first PCL playoff championship by defeating Los Angeles, who tied with Tacoma for the best record in the second half, 5–4–1, in a best-of-ten-games series. Roles were reversed in 1904 as Los Angeles bested Tacoma, 5–1.

The only other playoffs during this period occurred in 1918. After two PCL cities, San Francisco and Salt Lake City, passed "work or fight" laws to aid the effort to win World War I, league directors voted to suspend the season after the games of July 14. A postseason series between the first-place Vernon Tigers and second-place Los Angeles was held to decide the champion. Los Angeles won, 4–2.

=== Rise and fall of the Governors' Cup (1928–1962) ===
Playoffs were held briefly from 1928 to 1931, again involving a split season with the winners of each half meeting in a best-of-seven series to determine champions. In 1928, the San Francisco Seals defeated the Sacramento Senators, 4–2, to win the first Governors' Cup. The Seals and future winners of the playoffs were awarded a trophy cup named in recognition of the three states with PCL teams at the time: California, Oregon, and Washington. The league returned to recognizing pennant winners as champions from 1932 to 1935.

The Governors' Cup playoffs were revived and expanded from 1936 to 1954. Utilizing the Shaughnessy playoff system, the top four teams in the league, based on winning percentage, competed for the championship. The first round typically consisted of a best-of-seven series between the first and fourth-place teams and a series between the second and third-place teams. The winners of these semifinals then faced one another for the championship in a best-of-seven series. The first four-team Governors' Cup was won in 1933 by the Portland Beavers, who defeated the Oakland Oaks, 4–1. Financial problems resulted in the cancellation of the playoffs in 1950, 1952, and 1953 and the shortening of the final round to best-of-three series in 1951 and 1954. The last Governors' Cup, awarded in 1954, was won by Oakland, who swept San Francisco for the title.

Postseason play and the awarding of the Governors' Cup was discontinued from 1955 to 1962. During this time, regular-season pennant winner were declared champions. The trophy itself was placed in the Helms Athletic Foundation Museum in Los Angeles in 1954, sold to a collector when the museum closed, and was subsequently stolen. A number of other trophies have been awarded to championship teams in later years during which postseason play occurred. The one given in the 1980s and early 1990s was four feet tall and incorporated three full-size baseball bats and a glove. One design from the mid-1990s resembled Major League Baseball's Commissioner's Trophy issued to World Series champions. From 1998 to 2019, the trophy was an engraved glass wedge fixed to a wooden base.

=== Divisional era (1963–present) ===
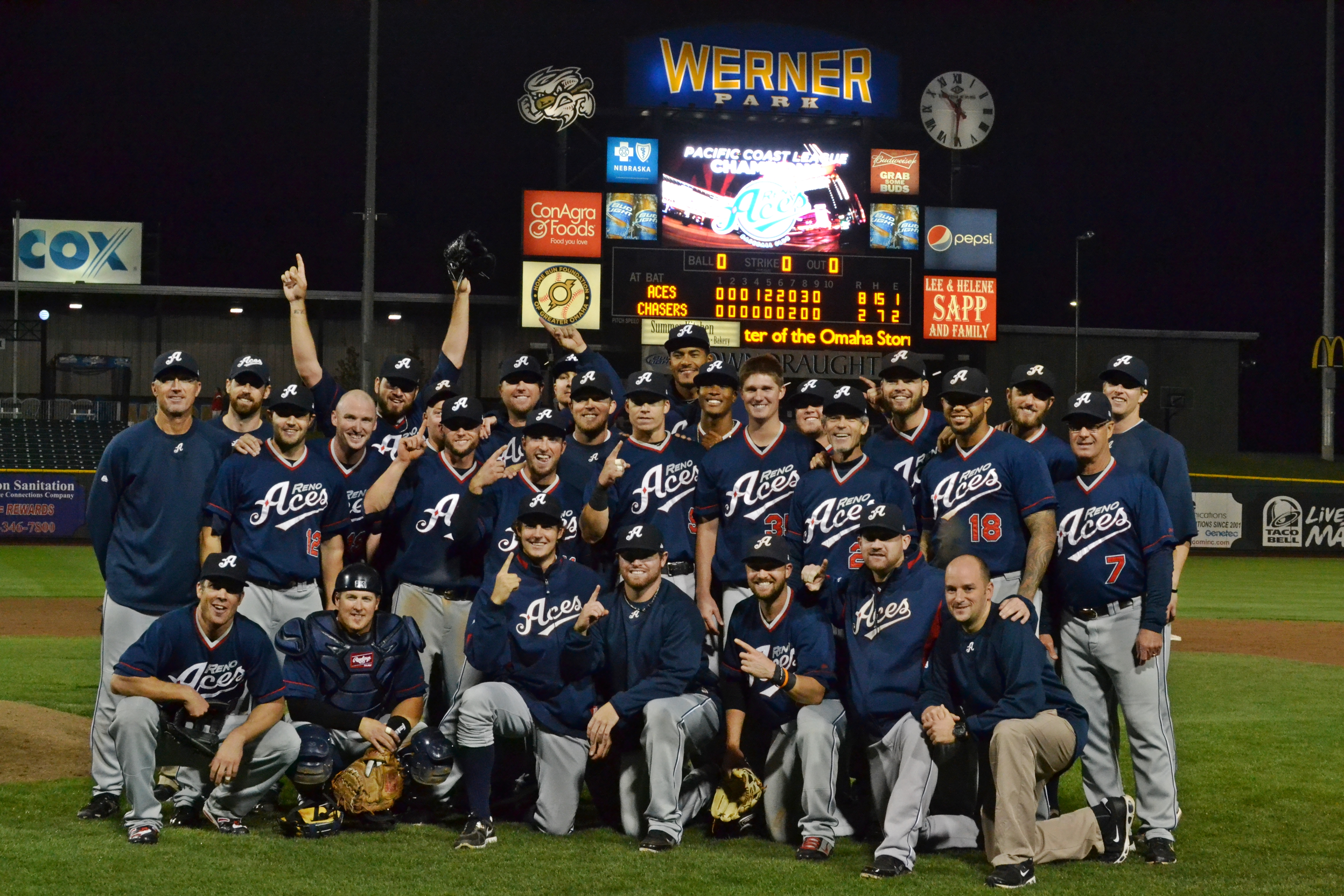
The 2012 PCL champion Reno Aces

The Pacific Coast League divided its teams into two divisions for the first time in 1963 after absorbing three teams from the former American Association, which had disbanded after the previous season. From 1963 to 1977, the winners of each division met in a best-of-seven series (sometimes five) to determine a champion. The playoffs were expanded to include two wild card teams in 1978. The winners of each division faced the second-place team in their own division, and the winners of these semifinals then played for the PCL championship, with each series being the best-of-five games.

From 1979 to 1997, the PCL adopted a split season format while maintaining its divisional alignment. Typically, the first and second-half champions within each division played a semifinal series to decide division champions. The winners of these then played for the league championship. In some instances, a team that won both halves of the season received a bye into the championship round, while in others the team in that division with the second-place full-season record was awarded a wild-card berth and became the first-place team's opponent. The divisional round began as a best-of-three contest, but it was expanded to the best-of-five in 1983. The championship round was usually contested as a best-of-five series, but it became the best-of-seven in some seasons.

The PCL expanded again in 1998 when the American Association, which had been revived in 1969, dissolved for a final time after the 1997 season. The league was then split into two eight-team conferences consisting of two four-team divisions. The division winners within each conference met in a best-of-five series to determine conference champions. Then, the conference winners played a best-of-five series to decide the league champion.

The 2020 season was cancelled due to the COVID-19 pandemic. The Pacific Coast League ceased operations before the 2021 season in conjunction with Major League Baseball's (MLB) reorganization of Minor League Baseball. In place of the league, MLB created the Triple-A West, a circuit divided into two divisions of four teams each. Prior to the 2022 season, MLB renamed the Triple-A West the Pacific Coast League, and it carried on the history of the PCL prior to reorganization. Rather than hold playoffs for its championship, the Triple-A West's 2021 title was awarded to the team with the best regular-season record. The Tacoma Rainiers won this championship by two games ahead of the Sugar Land Skeeters. In 2022, the winners of each division, East and West, met in a single game to determine the league champion. Beginning in 2023, the regular-season was split into two halves, and the winners of each half meet in a best-of-three series for the league championship.

== Champions ==
Key
Year	Some years are linked to articles about the champion team's season
Score	Score of the championship series
*	Co-champions
P	Regular-season pennant winner (1936–1954)
12	Won both the first and second half of the season (1979–1997)
WC	Wild card qualifier (1978–1997)

Champions
Year	Champion	Score	Runner-up	Other playoff teams	Ref.
1903	Los Angeles Angels	— (Note: Los Angeles (133–78) finished 27 1/2 games ahead of Sacramento.)	Sacramento Senators	—	
1904	Tacoma Tigers	5–4–1	Los Angeles Angels	—	
1905	Los Angeles Angels	5–1	Tacoma Tigers	—	
1906	Portland Beavers	— (Note: Portland (114–58) finished 21 games ahead of Seattle.)	Seattle Siwashes	—	
1907	Los Angeles Angels	— (Note: Los Angeles (115–74) finished 18 games ahead of San Francisco.)	San Francisco Seals	—	
1908	Los Angeles Angels	— (Note: Los Angeles (110–78) finished 13 1/2 games ahead of Portland.)	Portland Beavers	—	
1909	San Francisco Seals	— (Note: San Francisco (132–80) finished 13 1/2 games ahead of Portland.)	Portland Beavers	—	
1910	Portland Beavers	— (Note: Portland (118–85) finished 7 games ahead of Oakland.)	Oakland Oaks	—	
1911	Portland Beavers	— (Note: Portland (113–79) finished 2 games ahead of Vernon.)	Vernon Tigers	—	
1912	Oakland Oaks	— (Note: Oakland (120–83) finished 1 game ahead of Vernon.)	Vernon Tigers	—	
1913	Portland Beavers	— (Note: Portland (109–86) finished 7 games ahead of Sacramento.)	Sacramento Sacts	—	
1914	Portland Beavers	— (Note: Portland (113–84) finished 3 1/2 games ahead of Los Angeles.)	Los Angeles Angels	—	
1915	San Francisco Seals	— (Note: San Francisco (118–89) finished 5 games ahead of Salt Lake City.)	Salt Lake City Bees	—	
1916	Los Angeles Angels	— (Note: Los Angeles (119–79) finished 8 games ahead of Vernon.)	Vernon Tigers	—	
1917	San Francisco Seals	— (Note: San Francisco (119–93) finished 2 games ahead of Los Angeles.)	Los Angeles Angels	—	
1918	Los Angeles Angels	5–2 (Note: The 1918 season was suspended after the games of July 14 due to "work or fight" laws that were passed in San Francisco and Salt Lake City to aid the effort to win World War I. A postseason series between first-place Vernon and second-place Los Angeles was held to determine the champion.)	Vernon Tigers	—	
1919	Vernon Tigers	— (Note: Vernon (111–70) finished 2 1/2 games ahead of Los Angeles.)	Los Angeles Angels	—	
1920	Vernon Tigers	— (Note: Vernon (110–88) finished 5 1/2 games ahead of Seattle.)	Seattle Rainiers	—	
1921	Los Angeles Angels	— (Note: Los Angeles (108–80) finished 1 1/2 games ahead of Sacramento.)	Sacramento Senators	—	
1922	San Francisco Seals	— (Note: San Francisco (127–72) finished 4 games ahead of Vernon.)	Vernon Tigers	—	
1923	San Francisco Seals	— (Note: San Francisco (124–77) finished 11 games ahead of Sacramento.)	Sacramento Senators	—	
1924	Seattle Indians	— (Note: Seattle (109–91) finished 1 1/2 games ahead of Los Angeles.)	Los Angeles Angels	—	
1925	San Francisco Seals	— (Note: San Francisco (128–71) finished 12 1/2 games ahead of Salt Lake City.)	Salt Lake City Bees	—	
1926	Los Angeles Angels	— (Note: Los Angeles (121–81) finished 10 1/2 games ahead of Oakland.)	Oakland Oaks	—	
1927	Oakland Oaks	— (Note: Oakland (120–75) finished 14 1/2 games ahead of San Francisco.)	San Francisco Seals	—	
1928	San Francisco Seals	4–2	Sacramento Senators	—	
1929	Hollywood Stars	4–3	Mission Reds	—	
1930	Hollywood Stars	4–1	Los Angeles Angels	—	
1931	San Francisco Seals	4–0	Hollywood Stars	—	
1932	Portland Beavers	— (Note: Portland (111–78) finished 5 games ahead of Hollywood.)	Hollywood Stars	—	
1933	Los Angeles Angels	— (Note: Los Angeles (114–73) finished 6 1/2 games ahead of Portland.)	Portland Beavers	—	
1934	Los Angeles Angels	— (Note: Los Angeles won the championship by virtue of winning both halves of the season.)	—	—	
1935	San Francisco Seals	4–2	Los Angeles Angels	—	
1936	Portland Beavers^{P}	4–1	Oakland Oaks	San Diego Padres & Seattle Indians	
1937	San Diego Padres	4–0	Portland Beavers	Sacramento Solons^{P} & San Francisco Seals	
1938	Sacramento Solons	4–1	San Francisco Seals	Los Angeles Angels^{P} & Seattle Rainiers	
1939	Sacramento Solons	4–2	Los Angeles Angels	San Francisco Seals & Seattle Rainiers^{P}	
1940	Seattle Rainiers^{P}	4–1	Los Angeles Angels	Oakland Oaks & San Diego Padres	
1941	Seattle Rainiers	4–3	Sacramento Solons	Hollywood Stars^{P} & San Diego Padres	
1942	Seattle Rainiers	4–2	Los Angeles Angels	Sacramento Solons^{P} & San Diego Padres	
1943	San Francisco Seals	4–2	Seattle Rainiers	Los Angeles Angels^{P} & Portland Beavers	
1944	San Francisco Seals	4–3	Los Angeles Angels^{P}	Oakland Oaks & Portland Beavers	
1945	San Francisco Seals	4–2	Seattle Rainiers	Portland Beavers^{P} & Sacramento Solons	
1946	San Francisco Seals^{P}	4–2	Oakland Oaks	Hollywood Stars & Los Angeles Angels	
1947	Los Angeles Angels^{P}	4–1	Oakland Oaks	Portland Beavers & San Francisco Seals	
1948	Oakland Oaks^{P}	4–1	Seattle Rainiers	Los Angeles Angels & San Francisco Seals	
1949	Hollywood Stars^{P}	4–2	San Diego Padres	Oakland Oaks & Sacramento Solons	
1950	Oakland Oaks	— (Note: Oakland (118–82) finished 4 games ahead of San Diego.)	San Diego Padres	—	
1951	Seattle Rainiers^{P}	3–2	Hollywood Stars	Los Angeles Angels & Portland Beavers	
1952	Hollywood Stars	— (Note: Hollywood (109–71) finished 5 games ahead of Oakland.)	Oakland Oaks	—	
1953	Hollywood Stars	— (Note: Hollywood (106–74) finished 8 games ahead of Seattle.)	Seattle Rainiers	—	
1954	Oakland Oaks	3–0	San Francisco Seals	Hollywood Stars & San Diego Padres^{P}	
1955	Seattle Rainiers	— (Note: Seattle (95–77) finished 3 games ahead of San Diego.)	San Diego Padres	—	
1956	Los Angeles Angels	— (Note: Los Angeles (107–61) finished 16 games ahead of Seattle.)	Seattle Rainiers	—	
1957	San Francisco Seals	— (Note: San Francisco (101–67) finished 3 1/2 games ahead of Vancouver.)	Vancouver Mounties	—	
1958	Phoenix Giants	— (Note: Phoenix (89–65) finished 4 1/2 games ahead of San Diego.)	San Diego Padres	—	
1959	Salt Lake City Bees	— (Note: Salt Lake City (85–69) finished 1 1/2 games ahead of Vancouver.)	Vancouver Mounties	—	
1960	Spokane Indians	— (Note: Spokane (92–61) finished 11 1/2 games ahead of Tacoma.)	Tacoma Giants	—	
1961	Tacoma Giants	— (Note: Tacoma (97–57) finished 10 games ahead of Vancouver.)	Vancouver Mounties	—	
1962	San Diego Padres	— (Note: San Diego (93–61) finished 12 games ahead of Tacoma and Salt Lake, who were tied for second place.)	Tacoma Giants; Salt Lake City Bees	—	
1963	Oklahoma City 89ers	4–3	Spokane Indians	—	
1964	San Diego Padres	4–3	Arkansas Travelers	—	
1965	Oklahoma City 89ers	4–1	Portland Beavers	—	
1966	Seattle Angels	4–3	Tulsa Oilers	—	
1967	San Diego Padres	4–3	Spokane Indians	—	
1968	Tulsa Oilers	4–1	Spokane Indians	—	
1969	Tacoma Cubs	3–2	Eugene Emeralds	—	
1970	Spokane Indians	4–0	Hawaii Islanders	—	
1971	Salt Lake City Angels	3–0	Tacoma Cubs	—	
1972	Albuquerque Dukes	3–1	Eugene Emeralds	—	
1973	Spokane Indians	3–0	Tucson Toros	—	
1974	Spokane Indians	3–0	Albuquerque Dukes	—	
1975	Hawaii Islanders	3–2	Salt Lake City Gulls	—	
1976	Hawaii Islanders	3–2	Salt Lake City Gulls	—	
1977	Phoenix Giants	4–2	Hawaii Islanders	—	
1978*	Albuquerque Dukes	— (Note: Albuquerque and Tacoma were declared co-champions on the basis of having won the regular-season division titles after the semifinal series between Portland and Tacoma had been postponed by three rainouts and the teams could not afford to wait to complete the series.)	—	Portland Beavers & Salt Lake City Gulls	
1978*	Tacoma Yankees	—	—	Portland Beavers & Salt Lake City Gulls	
1979	Salt Lake City Gulls	3–0	Hawaii Islanders	Albuquerque Dukes & Vancouver Canadians	
1980	Albuquerque Dukes	3–2	Hawaii Islanders	Tucson Toros & Vancouver Canadians	
1981	Albuquerque Dukes^{12}	3–0	Tacoma Tigers	Hawaii Islanders	
1982	Albuquerque Dukes	4–2	Spokane Indians	Salt Lake City Gulls & Tacoma Tigers	
1983	Portland Beavers	3–0	Albuquerque Dukes	Edmonton Trappers & Las Vegas Stars	
1984	Edmonton Trappers	2–0 (Note: The best-of-five series was reduced to the best-of-three due to rain and unplayable field conditions.)	Hawaii Islanders	Las Vegas Stars & Salt Lake City Gulls	
1985	Vancouver Canadians	3–0	Phoenix Giants	Calgary Cannons & Hawaii Islanders	
1986	Las Vegas Stars	3–2	Vancouver Canadians^{12}	Phoenix Firebirds & Tacoma Tigers^{WC}	
1987	Albuquerque Dukes	3–1	Calgary Cannons	Las Vegas Stars & Tacoma Tigers	
1988	Las Vegas Stars	3–1	Vancouver Canadians^{12}	Albuquerque Dukes & Portland Beavers^{WC}	
1989	Vancouver Canadians	3–1	Albuquerque Dukes	Colorado Springs Sky Sox & Calgary Cannons	
1990	Albuquerque Dukes^{12}	3–0	Edmonton Trappers	Colorado Springs Sky Sox^{WC} & Tacoma Tigers	
1991	Tucson Toros	3–2	Calgary Cannons	Colorado Springs Sky Sox & Portland Beavers	
1992	Colorado Springs Sky Sox	3–0	Vancouver Canadians	Las Vegas Stars & Portland Beavers	
1993	Tucson Toros^{12}	4–2	Portland Beavers^{12}	—	
1994	Albuquerque Dukes	3–2	Vancouver Canadians^{12}	Colorado Springs Sky Sox & Salt Lake Buzz^{WC}	
1995	Colorado Springs Sky Sox	3–2	Salt Lake Buzz	Tucson Toros & Vancouver Canadians	
1996	Edmonton Trappers^{12}	3–1	Phoenix Firebirds	Las Vegas Stars & Salt Lake Buzz^{WC}	
1997	Edmonton Trappers	3–1	Phoenix Firebirds	Colorado Springs Sky Sox & Vancouver Canadians	
1998	New Orleans Zephyrs	3–2	Calgary Cannons	Fresno Grizzlies & Iowa Cubs	
1999	Vancouver Canadians	3–1	Oklahoma RedHawks	Omaha Golden Spikes & Salt Lake Buzz	
2000	Memphis Redbirds	3–1	Salt Lake Buzz	Albuquerque Dukes & Sacramento River Cats	
2001*	New Orleans Zephyrs	— (Note: New Orleans and Tacoma were declared co-champions after the playoffs were cancelled in the wake the September 11 terrorist attacks.)	—	Iowa Cubs & Sacramento River Cats	
2001*	Tacoma Rainiers	—	—	Iowa Cubs & Sacramento River Cats	
2002	Edmonton Trappers	3–1	Salt Lake Stingers	Las Vegas 51s & Oklahoma RedHawks	
2003	Sacramento River Cats	3–0	Nashville Sounds	Albuquerque Isotopes & Edmonton Trappers	
2004	Sacramento River Cats	3–0	Iowa Cubs	Oklahoma RedHawks & Portland Beavers	
2005	Nashville Sounds	3–0	Tacoma Rainiers	Oklahoma RedHawks & Sacramento River Cats	
2006	Tucson Sidewinders	3–0	Round Rock Express	Nashville Sounds & Salt Lake Bees	
2007	Sacramento River Cats	3–0	New Orleans Zephyrs	Nashville Sounds & Salt Lake Bees	
2008	Sacramento River Cats	3–1	Oklahoma RedHawks	Iowa Cubs & Salt Lake Bees	
2009	Memphis Redbirds	3–0	Sacramento River Cats	Albuquerque Isotopes & Tacoma Rainiers	
2010	Tacoma Rainiers	3–0	Memphis Redbirds	Oklahoma City RedHawks & Sacramento River Cats	
2011	Omaha Storm Chasers	3–0	Sacramento River Cats	Reno Aces & Round Rock Express	
2012	Reno Aces	3–1	Omaha Storm Chasers	Albuquerque Isotopes & Sacramento River Cats	
2013	Omaha Storm Chasers	3–1	Salt Lake Bees	Las Vegas 51s & Oklahoma City RedHawks	
2014	Omaha Storm Chasers	3–2	Reno Aces	Las Vegas 51s & Memphis Redbirds	
2015	Fresno Grizzlies	3–2	Round Rock Express	El Paso Chihuahuas & Oklahoma City Dodgers	
2016	El Paso Chihuahuas	3–1	Oklahoma City Dodgers	Nashville Sounds & Tacoma Rainiers	
2017	Memphis Redbirds	3–2	El Paso Chihuahuas	Colorado Springs Sky Sox & Reno Aces	
2018	Memphis Redbirds	3–1	Fresno Grizzlies	El Paso Chihuahuas & Oklahoma City Dodgers	
2019	Sacramento River Cats	3–0	Round Rock Express	Iowa Cubs & Las Vegas Aviators	
2020	None (season cancelled due to the COVID-19 pandemic)				
2021	Tacoma Rainiers	— (Note: Tacoma (73–47) finished 2 games ahead of Sugar Land.)	Sugar Land Skeeters	—	
2022	Reno Aces	1–0	El Paso Chihuahuas	—	
2023	Oklahoma City Dodgers	2–0	Round Rock Express	—	
2024	Sugar Land Space Cowboys	2–0	Reno Aces	—	
2025	Las Vegas Aviators	2–0	Tacoma Rainiers	—	
2026	Oklahoma City Comets	2–1	Las Vegas Aviators	—	

== Wins by team ==
Active Pacific Coast League teams appear in bold.

Team	Wins	Year(s)
San Francisco Seals	14	1909, 1915, 1917, 1922, 1923, 1925, 1928, 1931, 1935, 1943, 1944, 1945, 1946, 1957
Los Angeles Angels	12	1903, 1905, 1907, 1908, 1916, 1918, 1921, 1926, 1933, 1934, 1947, 1956
Albuquerque Dukes	8	1972, 1978, 1980, 1981, 1982, 1987, 1990, 1994
Portland Beavers	8	1906, 1910, 1911, 1913, 1914, 1932, 1936, 1983
Seattle Rainiers (Seattle Indians/Angels)	7	1924, 1940, 1941, 1942, 1951, 1955, 1966
**Tacoma Rainiers** (Tacoma Tigers/Giants/Cubs/Yankees)	7	1904, 1961, 1969, 1978, 2001, 2010, 2021
Hollywood Stars	5	1929, 1930, 1949, 1952, 1953
Oakland Oaks	5	1912, 1927, 1948, 1950, 1954
**Sacramento River Cats**	5	2003, 2004, 2007, 2008, 2019
Edmonton Trappers	4	1984, 1996, 1997, 2002
Memphis Redbirds	4	2000, 2009, 2017, 2018
**Oklahoma City Comets** (Oklahoma City 89ers/Dodgers)	4	1963, 1965, 2023, 2026
San Diego Padres	4	1937, 1962, 1964, 1967
Spokane Indians	4	1960, 1970, 1973, 1974
**Las Vegas Aviators** (Las Vegas Stars)	3	1986, 1988, 2025
Omaha Storm Chasers	3	2011, 2013, 2014
Salt Lake City Gulls (Salt Lake City Bees/Angels)	3	1959, 1971, 1979
Vancouver Canadians	3	1985, 1989, 1999
Colorado Springs Sky Sox	2	1992, 1995
Hawaii Islanders	2	1975, 1976
New Orleans Zephyrs	2	1998, 2001
Phoenix Giants	2	1958, 1977
**Reno Aces**	2	2012, 2022
Sacramento Solons	2	1938, 1939
Tucson Toros	2	1991, 1993
Vernon Tigers	2	1919, 1920
**El Paso Chihuahuas**	1	2016
Fresno Grizzlies	1	2015
Nashville Sounds	1	2005
**Sugar Land Space Cowboys**	1	2024
Tucson Sidewinders	1	2006
Tulsa Oilers	1	1968

== See also ==
- List of American Association champions
- List of International League champions
