= 1933 Los Angeles Angels season =

1933 Los Angeles Angels
- League: Pacific Coast League
- Ballpark: Wrigley Field
- City: Los Angeles
- Record: 114–73
- League place: 1st
- Managers: Jack Lelivelt

The 1933 Los Angeles Angels season was the 31st season in the history of the Los Angeles Angels baseball team. The 1933 team won the Pacific Coast League (PCL) pennant with a 114–73 record. Jack Lelivelt was the team's manager. The team played its home games at Wrigley Field in Los Angeles.

The Angels dominated the 1933 All-Pacific Coast League baseball team, claiming six of the twelve first-team spots. The first-team honorees were pitchers Buck Newsom and Dick Ward, third baseman Gene Lillard, shortstop Carl Dittmar, and outfielders Tuck Stainback and Jigger Statz.

== Pitchers ==
Pitcher Bobo Newsom received the 1933 Pacific Coast League Most Valuable Player Award, receiving 44 of the 56 votes cast by West Coast baseball writers. Newsom led the PCL in both wins (30) and earned run average (3.18). Ward was sold to the New York Yankees after the 1933 season.

The Angels' 1933 pitching staff also included Dick Ward who compiled a 25–9 record for a team-beat .735 winning percentage. Ward was sold to the Chicago Cubs after the 1933 season.

== Position players ==
Right fielder Tuck Stainback, a graduate of Los Angeles Fairfax High School, led the Angels with a .335 batting average and 264 hits. He gained attention before the season began when the Angels insured him for $75,000 – $25,000 for each leg and another $25,000 for his throwing arm.

Third baseman Gene Lillard compiled a .307 batting average, led the PCL with 44 home runs, and ranked third in the league with 149 RBIs (behind Joe DiMaggio and Prince Oana).

Center fielder Jigger Statz, at age 35, was the "old man" of the team, having played with the Angels, off-and-on, since 1920. In April 1933, the Angels held a day in his honor. During the 1933 season, Statz compiled a .325 batting average and ranked second on the team with 249 hits.

== 1933 PCL standings ==
Team	W	L	Pct.	GB
Los Angeles Angels	114	73	.610	--
Portland Beavers	105	77	.577	6.5
Hollywood Stars	107	80	.572	7.0
Sacramento Senators	96	85	.530	15.0
Oakland Oaks	93	92	.503	20.0
San Francisco Seals	81	106	.433	33.0
Mission Reds	79	108	.422	35.0
Seattle Rainiers	65	119	.353	47.5

== Statistics ==
=== Batting ===
Note: Pos = Position; G = Games played; AB = At bats; H = Hits; Avg. = Batting average; HR = Home runs; SLG = Slugging percentage

Pos	Player	G	AB	H	Avg.	HR	SLG
RF	Tuck Stainback	187	789	264	.335	19	.476
LF	Marv Gudat	183	741	247	.333	10	.451
2B	Jimmie Reese	104	393	130	.331	5	.458
CF	Jigger Statz	182	767	249	.325	10	.422
1B	Jim Oglesby	186	723	226	.313	20	480
3B	Gene Lillard	183	645	198	.307	43	.566
C	Bill Cronin	82	254	77	.303	2	.354
C	Hugh McMullen	134	400	107	.268	11	.413
SS	Carl Dittmar	149	478	126	.264	5	.343
IF	Mike Gazella	83	235	62	.264	7	.391

=== Pitching ===
Note: G = Games pitched; IP = Innings pitched; W = Wins; L = Losses; PCT = Win percentage; ERA = Earned run average; SO = Strikeouts

Player	G	IP	W	L	PCT	ERA
Bobo Newsom	56	320.0	30	11	.732	3.18
Dick Ward	43	285.0	25	9	.735	3.25
Fay Thomas	42	300.0	20	14	.588	3.75
Leroy Herrmann	29	188.0	16	9	.640	4.60
Win Ballou	50	217.0	12	19	.387	3.69
