= 1908 Los Angeles Angels season =

1908 Los Angeles Angels
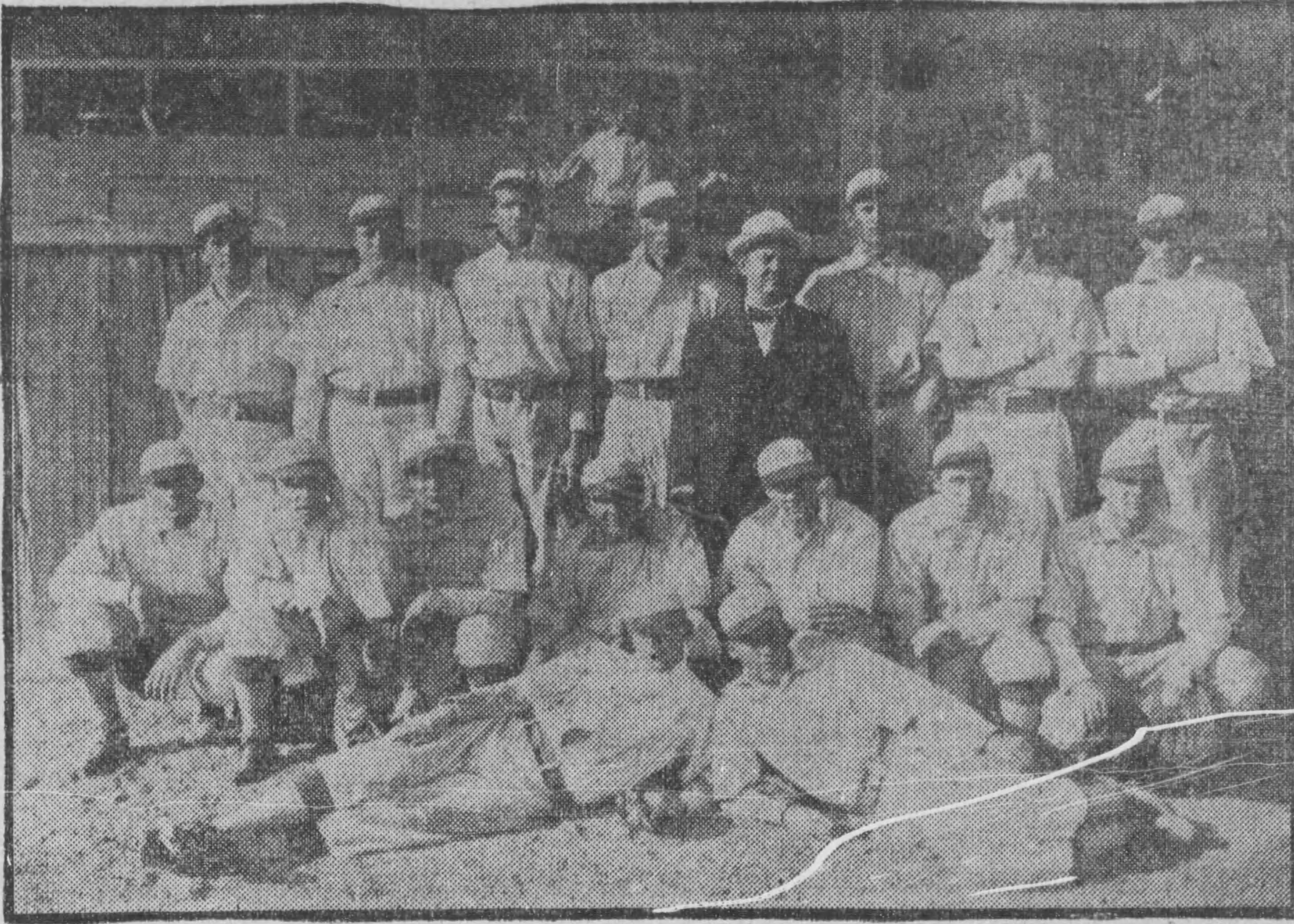
- 1908 Los Angeles Angels
- League: Pacific Coast League
- Ballpark: Chutes Park, Prager Park
- City: Los Angeles
- Record: 110–78
- League place: 1st
- Owners: Henry Berry
- Managers: Henry Berry

The 1908 Los Angeles Angels season was the sixth season for the Los Angeles Angels playing in the Pacific Coast League (PCL). The Angels compiled a 110–78 record and won the PCL pennant, finishing 13.5 games ahead of the second-place team. The team played its home games at Chutes Park and Prager Park in Los Angeles.

On November 8, 1908, after the season ended, a picked team consisting mostly of Angels played a game at Joy Park against the Los Angeles Giants, an African-American semiprofessional championship team. The picked team won by a 14-2 score. Dolly Gray struck out 12 batters, and right fielder Kitty Brashear had three hits, including a home run, and scored three runs.

== Management ==
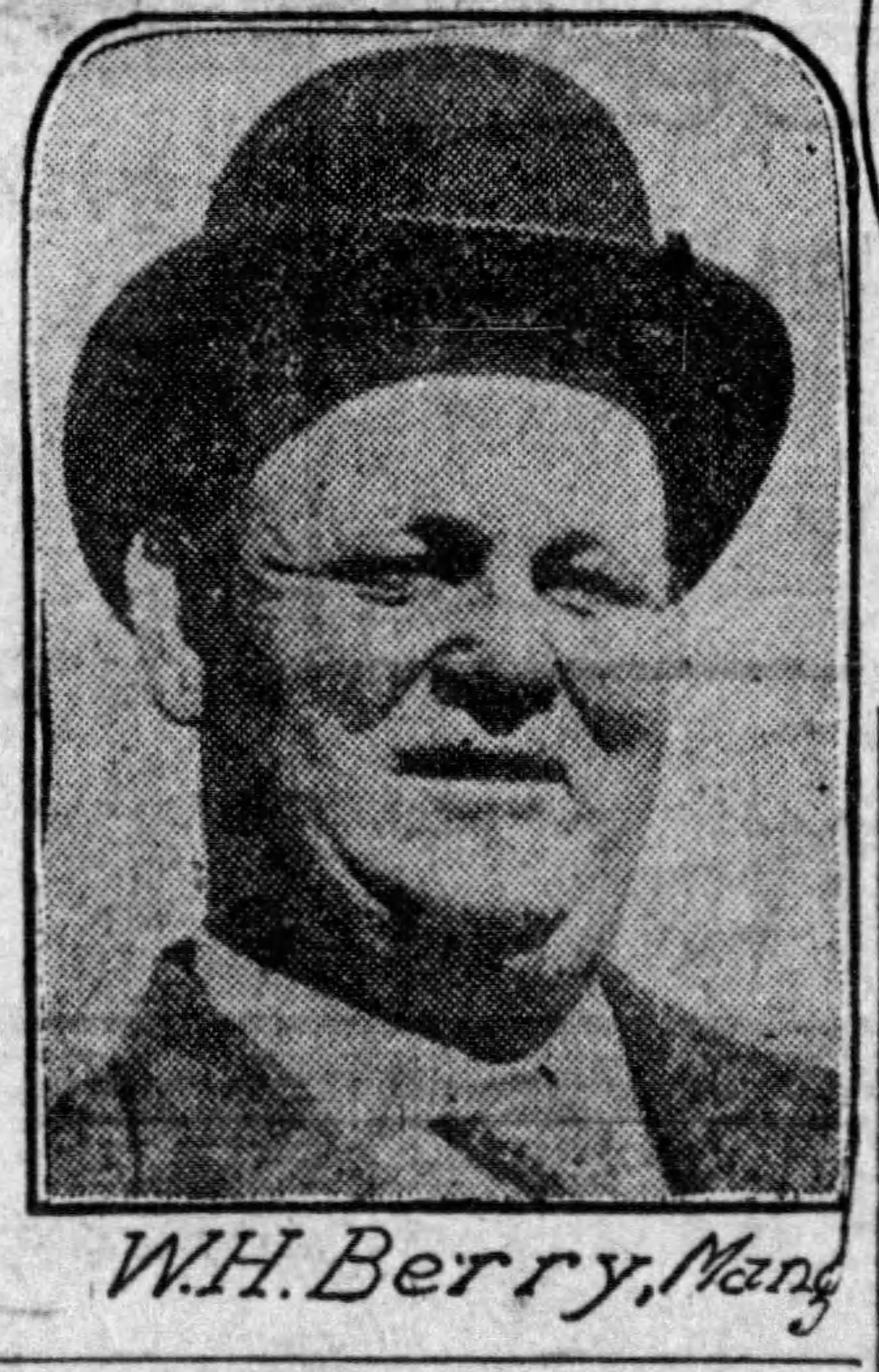
Henry Berry

Henry Berry was the team's manager and controlling owner, and Pop Dillon was the team captain. After leading the Angels to their second consecutive PCL pennant, Berry drew attention to his club by challenging the Chicago Cubs, winners of the 1908 World Series, to play the Angels in a championship series in Los Angeles. The Los Angeles Herald praised his leadership: "Probably no sportsman in the west enjoys a greater degree of personal popularity than Henry Berry . . . and his popularity is well deserved. In the two full years that he has been at the helm of the club he has won the pennant and has given Los Angeles the greatest baseball club that it ever had. Berry is a diplomat, as well as a thoroughbred sportsman, and is a great power in baseball affairs on the coast."

On November 9, Henry Berry announced he had was turning over management of the team to Pop Dillon.

== Pitchers ==
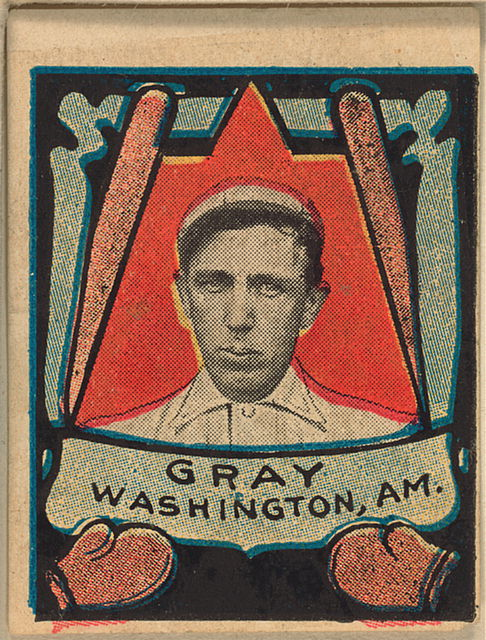
Dolly Gray

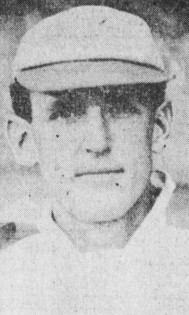
Judge Nagle

Pitcher Dolly Gray, a native of Michigan, appeared in 47 games and compiled a 26–11–2 record. He ranked third in the PCL with 234 strikeouts. Gray had five 20-win seasons for the Angels between 1903 and 1908. He went on to play for the Washington Senators from 1909 to 1911.

Walter "Judge" Nagle, a native of Santa Rosa, California, was a bank clerk by profession who played professional baseball for the love of the game. He appeared in 38 games for the 1908 Angels and compiled a 24–10 record.

Franz Hosp, a Cincinnati native, played for teams in San Bernardino and San Diego before joining the Angels in 1907. He was described by the Los Angeles Times as "a heaver with big class." He appeared in 37 games and compiled a 20–15 record.

Andy Briswalter, a 19-year-old native of Whittier, California, played semiprofessional baseball in 1907 before being signed by the Angels. He appeared in 23 games and compiled a 13-5 record. His .732 winning percentage was the second highest in the PCL among pitchers having more than one decision.

Elmer Koestner, a 20-year-old native of Illinois, was described by the Los Angeles Times as the team's "hard luck pitcher" since "in three-fourths of the games he pitches the players behind him boot the ball all around." He appeared in 39 games and compiled an 11-23 record.

== Infielders ==
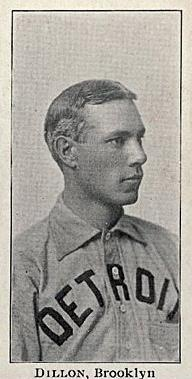
Pop Dillon

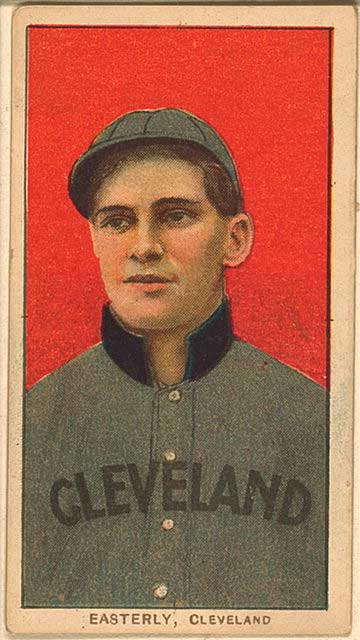
Ted Easterly

Catcher Ted Easterly, a 20-year-old Nebraska native, began playing professional ball for Pasadena in 1905 and played for San Diego in 1907. During the 1908 season, he appeared in 123 games, led the team with a .309 batting average, and hit for a .399 slugging percentage. The Chicago Cubs tried to purchase him during the 1908 season, but the Angels' sale prices was not accepted. He was acquired by the Cleveland Naps for the 1909 season. He played seven seasons in the major leagues.

First baseman and team captain Pop Dillon appeared in 168 games and compiled a .271 batting average with 33 stolen bases, 24 doubles, seven triples, and seven home runs.

Second baseman Curt Bernard was a West Virginia native who joined the Angels in 1904. Bernard played baseball while attending medical school. The Los Angeles Herald noted in June 1908:

He is as great a bunter as old Jesse Burkett, and can hit the ball out when he wants to. He is popular for many reasons, but principally because he seldom is seen to strike out, drop a fly or make a wild throw, and it is next to impossible to catch him napping off a base or run him down between the cushions. He plays the game all the time and always is making good wherever he plays. He has had many chances to break into the big leagues, but has declined all offers because he desires to remain in Los Angeles to finish his medical studies . . . Money cannot take him away, and he had made it so clear to big league scouts that he will quit the game rather than play anywhere other than with the Angels . . ."

Bernard appeared in 129 games and compiled a .272 batting average, scored 77 runs, and stole 29 bases.

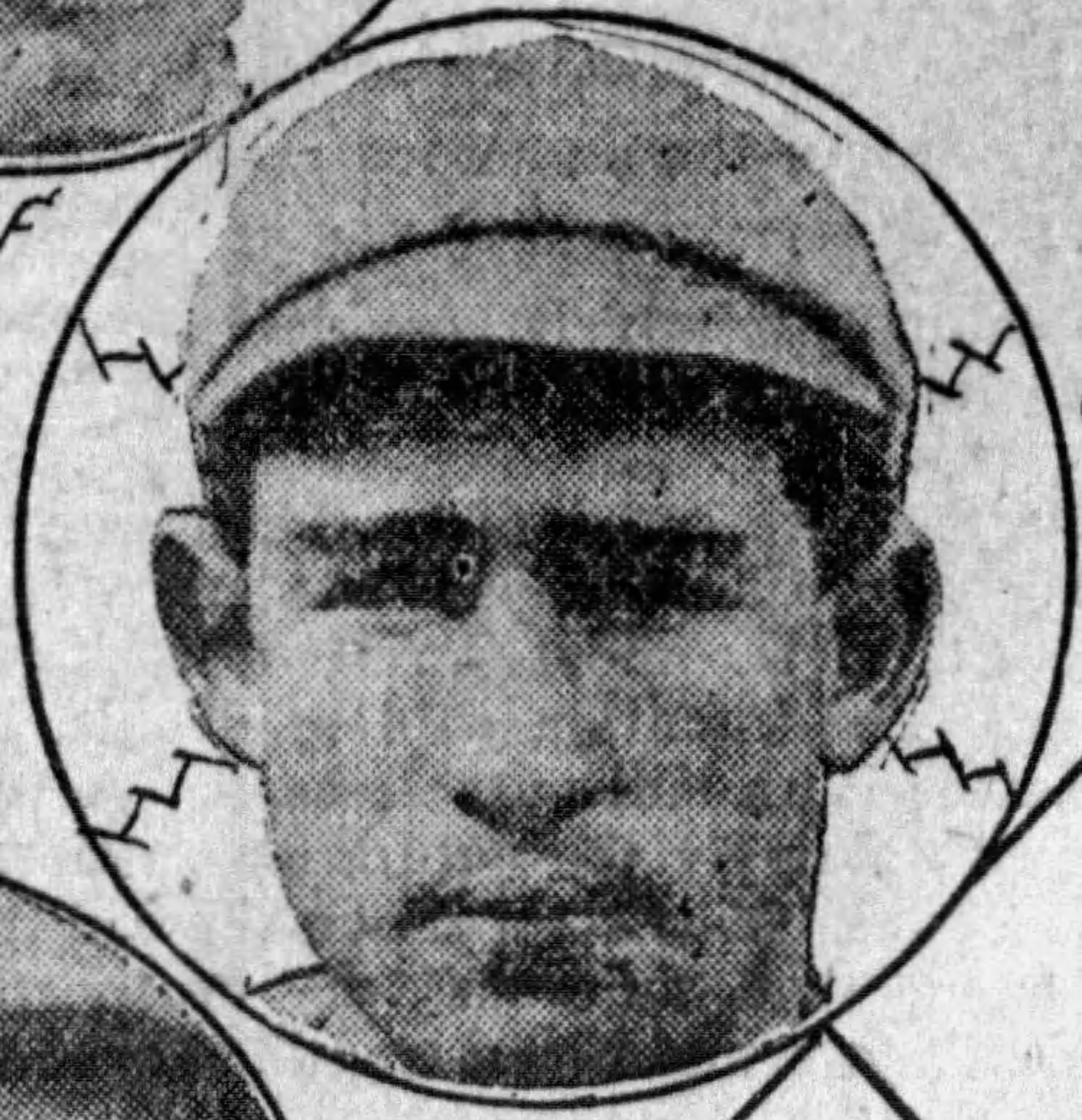
Bert "Del" Delmas

Shortstop Bert "Del" Delmas, a San Francisco native, started playing professional baseball with San Francisco in 1902. He played for the Angels from 1906 to 1911. He appeared in 177 games during the 1908 season, compiled a .248 average, and was described by the Los Angeles Times as "probably the best shortstop in the league."

Third baseman Jud Smith, a Michigan native, maintained a successful dental practice in addition to playing baseball. He began playing professional baseball in 1887, including stints with the Cincinnati Reds and St. Louis Browns. He joined the Angels in 1903. In 1905, he was suspended by the Angels after assaulting an umpire. In 1908, the 39-year-old Smith appeared in 161 games, compiled a .239 batting average, scored 67 runs, and stole 28 bases.

== Outfielders ==
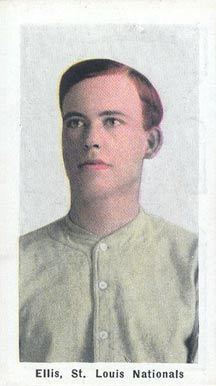
Rube Ellis

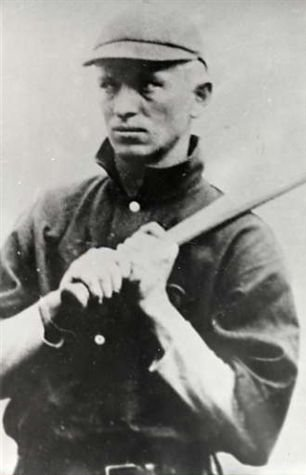
Rebel Oakes

Center fielder Rebel Oakes, a 24-year-old Louisiana native, appeared in 192 games, compiled a .288 batting average, and led the team with 212 hits, 98 runs scored, and 36 stolen bases.

Left fielder Rube Ellis, a native of Rivera, California (now known as "Pico Rivera"), joined the Angels in 1905 after playing semiprofessional baseball in his hometown. In 1908, he appeared in 184 games, scored 91 runs, and compiled a .269 batting average with 30 stolen bases, 19 doubles and 13 triples. He was sold to the Cincinnati Reds effective in the 1909 season.

Right fielder Kitty Brashear joined the Angels in 1904 and was used in a utility role. He played shortstop from the Angels in 1905, and in 1906 played third base for a Pennsylvania team. In 1907, he played second and third base for the Angels. In 1908, he became the team's regular right fielder. The Los Angeles Times praised his versatility and called him "one of the most valuable men on the team." He appeared in 156 games, compiled a .259 batting average and stole 25 bases.

== 1908 PCL standings ==
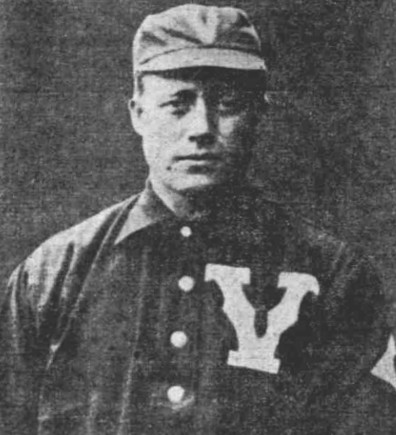
Kitty Brashear

Team	W	L	Pct.	GB
Los Angeles Angels	110	78	.585	--
Portland Browns	95	90	.514	13.5
San Francisco Seals	100	104	.490	18.0
Oakland Oaks	83	116	.417	32.5

== Statistics ==
=== Batting ===
Note: Pos = Position; G = Games played; AB = At bats; H = Hits; Avg. = Batting average; HR = Home runs; SLG = Slugging percentage

Pos	Player	G	AB	H	Avg.	HR	SLG
C	Ted Easterly	123	376	116	.309	3	.399
OF	Rebel Oakes	192	736	212	.288	0	.344
1B	Pop Dillon	168	620	168	.271	7	.366
2B	Curt Bernard	129	507	138	.272	1	.318
OF	Kitty Brashear	156	537	139	.259	2	.311
3B	Jud Smith	161	612	146	.239	0	.297
CF	Rube Ellis	184	646	174	.269	5	.362
SS	Del Delmas	177	624	155	.248	2	.324
2B, 3B, 1B, OF	George Wheeler	119	398	84	.211	1	.279
C	Wallace Hogan	99	275	45	.164	0	.200

=== Pitching ===
Note: G = Games pitched; IP = Innings pitched; W = Wins; L = Losses; PCT = Win percentage; ERA = Earned run average; SO = Strikeouts

Player	G	W	L	PCT	Runs	BB	SO
Dolly Gray	47	26	11	.703	117	151	234
Judge Nagle	38	24	10	.706	92	83	90
Franz Hosp	37	20	15	.572	104	115	105
Andy Briswalter	23	13	5	.722	56	46	80
Elmer Koestner	39	11	23	.324	133	106	157
