= 1934 Los Angeles Angels season =

1934 Los Angeles Angels
- League: Pacific Coast League
- Ballpark: Wrigley Field
- City: Los Angeles
- Record: 137–50
- League place: 1st
- Managers: Jack Lelivelt

The 1934 Los Angeles Angels season was the 32nd season in the history of the Los Angeles Angels baseball team. They won the Pacific Coast League (PCL) pennant with a 137–50 record, the best record in league history. Jack Lelivelt was the team's manager. The team played its home games at Wrigley Field in Los Angeles.

== Season summary ==
The Angels entered the season as the PCL's defending champions, having won the pennant in 1933. They jumped out to an early lead in the standings, and in June, the PCL directors voted to split the season into two halves. When the first half ended on June 24, the Angels had a record of 66–18 for a .786 winning percentage and were 18 games ahead of the second-place team. Los Angeles then won the second half of the season with a 71–32 record, 12 games ahead of the second-place team. For the entire season, the Angels went 137–50, setting PCL records for wins and winning percentage (.733). They led all teams with a .299 batting average, 127 home runs, 1,118 runs, 991 runs batted in, 1,935 hits, 326 doubles, 2,762 total bases, and 195 stolen bases.

Right fielder Frank Demaree was voted the league's most valuable player. In 186 games, he had a .383 batting average, 45 home runs, and 173 runs batted in to win the PCL triple crown. He also led the league with 190 runs, 269 hits, 51 doubles, 463 total bases, and a .660 slugging percentage. Other than the 1934 season, Demaree spent his professional baseball career in the National League from 1933 to 1943. Center fielder Jigger Statz hit .324 and stole 71 bases. Left fielder Marv Gudat appeared in all 188 games for the 1934 Angels and compiled a .333 batting average. All three members of the outfield (Demaree, Statz, and Gudat) were later inducted into the Pacific Coast League Hall of Fame.

The team also included three pitchers who won 20 games. Fay Thomas had a 28–4 record, a 2.59 earned run average, and 204 strikeouts, leading the PCL in wins and strikeouts. His .875 winning percentage set a league record for pitchers with at least 20 decisions. Thomas was also later inducted into PCL Hall of Fame. Mike Meola compiled a 20–5 record, and Lou Garland went 21–9. Most of the 1934 Angels players appeared in Major League Baseball during their careers.

At the end of the regular season, the PCL arranged a seven-game series between the Angels and an all-star team from the rest of the PCL. The Angels won the series, billed as the "Little World Series", four games to two.

The 1934 Angels were selected as the greatest minor league team in baseball history by Minor League Baseball. In 2003, the 1934 Angels were selected as the best team in the PCL's 100-year history by a panel of minor league experts.

== Player statistics ==
=== Batting ===
Note: Pos = Position; G = Games played; AB = At bats; H = Hits; AVG = Batting average; HR = Home runs; RBI = Runs batted in

Pos	Player	G	AB	H	AVG	HR	RBI
RF	Frank Demaree	186	702	269	.383	45	173
CF	Jigger Statz	183	760	246	.324	6	66
LF	Marv Gudat	188	758	242	.319	4	125
1B	Jim Oglesby	188	725	226	.312	15	139
2B	Jimmie Reese	180	733	228	.311	3	85
C	Gilly Campbell	145	459	140	.305	17	97
3B	Gene Lillard	171	592	171	.289	27	119
SS	Carl Dittmar	151	517	152	.294	3	73

=== Pitching ===
Note: G = Games pitched; IP = Innings pitched; W = Wins; L = Losses; PCT = Win percentage; ERA = Earned run average; SO = Strikeouts

Player	G	IP	W	L	PCT	ERA	SO
Fay Thomas	41	295	28	4	.875	2.59	204
Lou Garland	41	249	21	9	.700	2.67	91
Mike Meola	42	248	20	5	.800	2.90	93
John Campbell	48	283	19	15	.559	2.63	80
Roy Henshaw	38	196	16	4	.800	2.76	120
Emmett Nelson	29	171	14	5	.737	2.53	72
Dick Ward	20	137	13	4	.765	2.63	54
