= 1907 Los Angeles Angels season =

1907 Los Angeles Angels
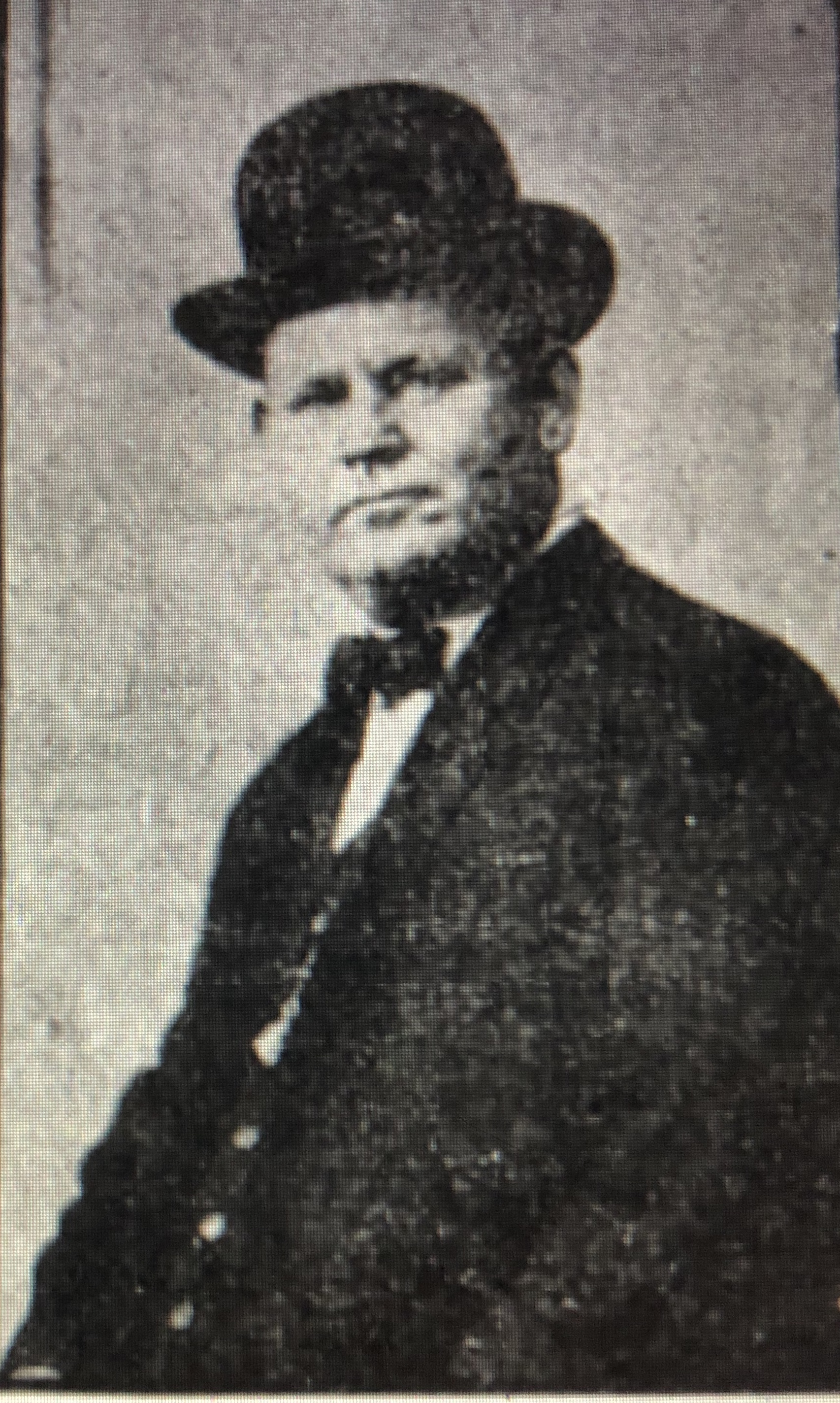
- Team owner and manager Henry Berry
- League: Pacific Coast League
- Ballpark: Chutes Park, Prager Park
- City: Los Angeles
- Record: 115–74
- League place: 1st
- Owners: Henry Berry
- Managers: Henry Berry

The 1907 Los Angeles Angels season was the fifth season for the Los Angeles Angels playing in the Pacific Coast League (PCL). The Angels compiled a 115–74 record and won the PCL pennant. The team played its home games at Chutes Park and Prager Park in Los Angeles.

Henry Berry was the team's manager. In January 1907, he also purchased a controlling interest in the team.

== Pitchers ==
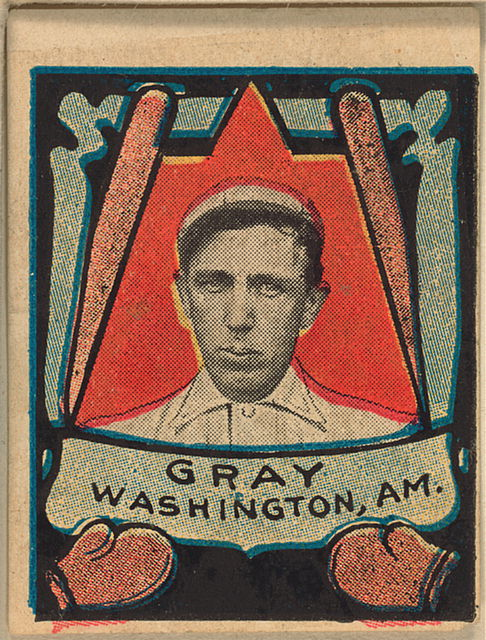
Dolly Gray

Pitcher Dolly Gray was the dominant pitcher in the PCL in 1906. He appeared in 53 games and led the league with 32 wins and a 1.71 earned run average (ERA). He ranked second in the league with 216 strikeouts. Gray had five 20-win season for the Angels between 1903 and 1908. He went on to play for the Washington Senators from 1909 to 1911.

"Sleepy Bill" Burns appeared in 42 games finished third in the PCL with a 2.10 ERA and fifth with 24 wins. Burns went on to play five seasons in the majors from 1908 to 1912.

Judge Nagle was the Angels' No. 3 pitcher. Contemporary records indicate that he compiled a 16–14–1 record with 50 strikeouts. Baseball-Reference.com indicates he had a 16–12 record with a 2.26 ERA.

Franz Hosp compiled a 12–7 record with a 2.73 ERA and 56 strikeouts in 23 games.

== Position players ==
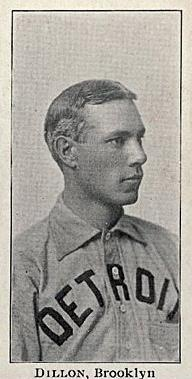
Pop Dillon

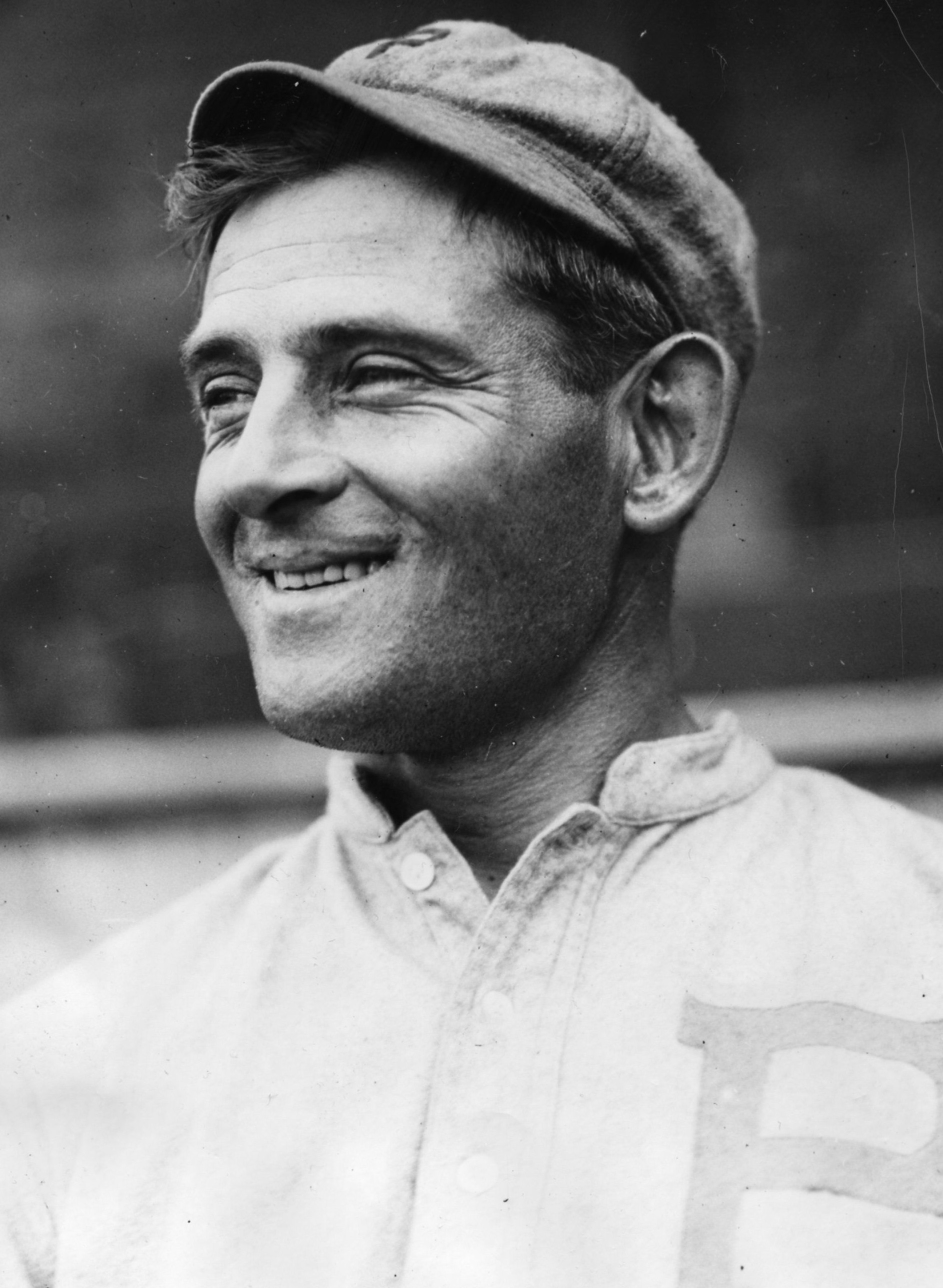
Gavvy Cravath

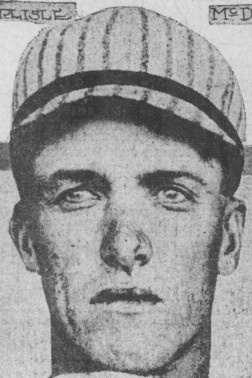
Walter Carlisle

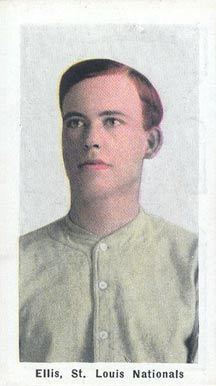
Rube Ellis

First baseman Pop Dillon appeared in 181 games. His batting average of .304 was the best among the Angels and third best in the PCL. He tallied 192 hits, 34 stolen bases, and 30 doubles. Defensively, his .988 fielding percentage was the best among the league's first basemen who played more than 13 games. He tallied 1,889 putouts, 128 assists, and 25 errors.

Right fielder Gavvy Cravath appeared in 182 games, compiled a .303 batting average, tallied 186 hits, scored 106 runs, and stole 50 bases. He tied for first in the PCL with 45 doubles and tied for second with 10 home runs. He also played well in the outfield, tallying 287 putouts, 41 assists, and 9 errors in 173 games in the outfield for a .973 fielding percentage. He later played 11 seasons in the majors, leading the National League in home runs six times between 1913 and 1919.

Left fielder Walter Carlisle appeared in 179 games, led the PCL with 14 home runs and 114 runs scored, and finished second with eight triples. He also stole 39 bases. Defensively, he tallied 320 putouts, 18 assists, and 16 errors for a .955 fielding percentage.

Center fielder Rube Ellis appeared in 171 games. He compiled a .239 batting average with 29 stolen bases, 15 doubles and seven triples. He tallied 315 putouts, 18 assists, and 14 errors for a .960 fielding percentage.

Curt Bernard appeared in 141 games for the Angels, 94 at second base and 47 in the outfield. He compiled a .271 batting average with 35 stolen bases, 23 doubles, and 77 runs scored.

Kitty Brashear appeared in 159 games, 95 at second base and 65 at third base. He compiled a .270 batting average with 36 stolen bases and 30 doubles.

Third baseman Jud Smith appeared in 118 games. He compiled a .243 batting average with 20 stolen bases. He tallied 161 putouts, 294 assists, and 30 errors for a .938 fielding percentage.

Shortstop Del Delmas appeared in 175 games. He compiled a .227 batting average with 25 stolen bases and 23 doubles. He led the league's shortstops with a .938 fielding percentage, tallying 311 putouts, 581 assists, and 59 errors.

The team's catching duty was shared by Wallace Hogan (109 games) and Bobby Eager (83 games).

== 1907 PCL standings ==
Team	W	L	Pct.	GB
Los Angeles Angels	115	74	.608	--
San Francisco Seals	104	99	.512	18.0
Oakland Commuters	97	101	.490	22.5
Portland Browns	72	114	.387	41.5

== Statistics ==
=== Batting ===
Note: Pos = Position; G = Games played; AB = At bats; H = Hits; Avg. = Batting average; HR = Home runs; SLG = Slugging percentage

Pos	Player	G	AB	H	Avg.	HR	SLG
1B	Pop Dillon	181	631	192	.304	5	.396
RF	Gavvy Cravath	182	614	186	.303	10	.441
2B, CF	Curt Bernard	141	539	146	.271	0	.325
2B, 3B	Kitty Brashear	159	581	157	.270	0	.332
LF	Walter Carlisle	179	648	168	.259	14	.381
3B	Jud Smith	118	432	105	.243	0	.285
CF	Rube Ellis	171	578	138	.239	4	.310
SS	Del Delmas	175	604	137	.227	2	.281
C	Bobby Eager	97	282	57	.202	0	.245
C	Wallace Hogan	117	375	63	.168	1	.208

=== Pitching ===
Note: G = Games pitched; IP = Innings pitched; W = Wins; L = Losses; PCT = Win percentage; ERA = Earned run average; SO = Strikeouts

Player	G	IP	W	L	PCT	ERA	SO
Dolly Gray	45	421.1	32	14	.696	1.71	216
"Sleepy Bill" Burns	42	364.2	24	17	.585	2.10	144
Judge Nagle	29	266.1	16	12	.571	2.26	69
Franz Hosp	23	191.0	12	7	.632	2.73	56
