= 1905 Los Angeles Angels season =

1905 Los Angeles Angels
- League: Pacific Coast League
- Ballpark: Chutes Park, Prager Park
- City: Los Angeles
- Record: 120–94
- League place: 1st
- Owners: Jim Morley
- Managers: Jim Morley

The 1905 Los Angeles Angels season was the third season for the Los Angeles Angels playing in the Pacific Coast League (PCL). The Angels compiled a 120–94 record and won the PCL pennant. They defeated the Tacoma Tigers, five games to one, in the PCL championship series. Jim Morley was the team's manager and owner, and Pop Dillon was the team captain. The team played its home games at Chutes Park and Prager Park in Los Angeles.

== 1905 PCL standings ==
Team	W	L	Pct.	GB
Los Angeles Angels	120	94	.561	--
San Francisco Seals	125	100	.556	
Tacoma Tigers	106	107	.498	
Oakland Commuters	103	119	.464	
Portland Giants	94	110	.461	
Seattle Siwashes	93	111	.456	

== Statistics ==
=== Batting ===
Note: Pos = Position; G = Games played; AB = At bats; H = Hits; Avg. = Batting average; HR = Home runs; SLG = Slugging percentage

Pos	Player	G	AB	H	Avg.	HR	SLG
SS	Kitty Brashear	189	653	198	.303	4	.400
1B	Pop Dillon	216	778	211	.271	2	.341
RF	Gavvy Cravath	204	703	182	.259	9	.368
3B	Jud Smith	198	752	187	.249	2	.322
CF	Curt Bernard	193	736	181	.246	2	.288
2B	Tim Flood	188	716	174	.243	5	.318
LF	Art Ross	208	726	175	.241	0	.285
C	Bobby Eager	122	381	74	.194	0	.223
C	Harry Spies	127	395	75	.190	0	.243
SS	Jimmy Toman	96	323	56	.173	0	.207

=== Pitching ===
Note: G = Games pitched; IP = Innings pitched; W = Wins; L = Losses; PCT = Win percentage; ERA = Earned run average; SO = Strikeouts

Player	G	IP	W	L	PCT	ERA	SO
Dolly Gray	52	419.1	27	16	.628	2.15	
Spider Baum	57	445.0	27	28	.491	2.18	
Bill Tozer	39	343.0	22	16	.579	2.05	
Rusty Hall	41	329.2	17	15	.531	2.16	
Judge Nagle	14	118.1	11	0	1.000	1.37	
Harry Goodwin	26	167.0	9	9	.500	2.75	
