= 1918 Los Angeles Angels season =

1918 Los Angeles Angels
- League: Pacific Coast League
- Ballpark: Washington Park
- City: Los Angeles
- Record: 57–47
- League place: 2nd
- Managers: Red Killefer

The 1918 Los Angeles Angels season was the 16th season for the Los Angeles Angels playing in the Pacific Coast League (PCL). The PCL season ended early on July 14 due to wartime travel restrictions and the Spanish flu pandemic. When the season was suspended, the Angels were in second place with a 57–47 record.

A postseason series was held between the Angels and the first-place Vernon Tigers. The Angels won the championship series by five games to two, winning the final game on July 22, 1918, at Washington Park. Right fielder Sam Crawford and shortstop Zeb Terry led the Angels in the championship series with nine hits each. Terry also scored seven runs in the series.

Doc Crandall was the Angels' top pitcher, appearing in 25 games and compiling a 16–9 record and 2.06 earned run average (ERA).

First baseman Jack Fournier was the team's top hitter, appearing in all 104 games and compiling a .325 batting average with 26 doubles and 13 triples.

Red Killefer was the team's manager and also appeared in 99 games while compiling a .298 batting average.

== 1918 PCL standings ==
Team	W	L	Pct.	GB
Vernon Tigers	58	45	.563	--
Los Angeles Angels	57	47	.601	1.5
San Francisco Seals	51	51	.500	6.5
Salt Lake City Bees	49	49	.500	6.5
Sacramento Senators	48	48	.500	6.5
Oakland Oaks	40	63	.388	18.0

== Statistics ==
=== Batting ===
Note: Pos = Position; G = Games played; AB = At bats; H = Hits; Avg. = Batting average; HR = Home runs; SLG = Slugging percentage

Pos	Player	G	AB	H	Avg.	HR	SLG
1B	Jack Fournier	104	400	130	.325	4	.485
2B, CF	Red Killefer	99	387	114	.295	0	.359
RF	Sam Crawford	96	356	104	.292	1	.379
LF	Rube Ellis	104	366	102	.279	1	.366
CF	Claude Cooper	73	248	67	.270	1	.347
SS	Zeb Terry	93	342	90	.263	0	.322
3B	Joe Pepe	92	316	75	.237	5	.313
2B	Kid Butler	37	128	33	.258	0	.305
C	Walter Boles	78	266	68	.256	0	.312
C	Pete Lapan	48	123	31	.252	0	.301

=== Pitching ===
Note: G = Games pitched; IP = Innings pitched; W = Wins; L = Losses; PCT = Win percentage; ERA = Earned run average

Player	G	IP	W	L	PCT	ERA
Doc Crandall	27	222.1	16	9	.640	2.06
Curly Brown	22	173.1	12	7	.632	1.56
Bill Pertica	23	180.1	12	7	.632	2.25
Paul Fittery	25	210.0	11	13	.458	2.66
Pete Standridge	15	79.2	5	5	.500	2.94
