= 1925 San Francisco Seals season =

1925 San Francisco Seals
- League: Pacific Coast League
- Ballpark: Recreation Park
- City: San Francisco
- Record: 128–71
- League place: 1st
- Manager: Babe Ellison

The 1925 San Francisco Seals season was the 23rd season in the history of the San Francisco Seals baseball team. The 1925 team won the Pacific Coast League (PCL) pennant with a 128–71 record.

The team was selected by Minor League Baseball as the tenth greatest minor league team in baseball history. The 1925 Seals were also selected in 2003 by a panel of minor league experts as the second best team in the PCL's 100-year history.

Outfielder Paul Waner won the PCL batting championship with a .401 batting average and tallied 280 hits and 75 doubles. Waner was sold to the Pittsburgh Pirates after the 1925 season for $40,000. He went on to play 15 years for the Pirates and was later inducted into both the Baseball Hall of Fame and the Pacific Coast League Hall of Fame.

Right fielder Frank Brower had a .362 batting average and led the team with 36 home runs and 411 total bases. First baseman and manager Babe Ellison compiled a .325 batting average with 22 home runs. Ellison was inducted into the Pacific Coast League Hall of Fame in 2006. Smead Jolley also began his professional baseball career with the 1925 Seals. He joined the club late in the season and hit .447 in 34 games. Smolley went on to win PCL batting titles in 1927, 1928, and 1938. He was inducted in the Pacific Coast League Hall of Fame in 2003.

Pitcher Doug "Buzz" McWeeny led the team with an .800 winning percentage (20–5 win–loss record) and a 2.70 earned run average (ERA). He was drafted by the Brooklyn Dodgers after the 1925 season. In addition to McWeeny, three other San Francisco pitchers won 20 games: Guy Williams (21-10, 3.84 ERA); Bob Geary (20-12, 4.01 ERA), and Ollie Mitchell (20-8, 4.29 ERA).

== 1925 PCL standings ==
| Team | W | L | Pct. |
|---|---|---|---|
| San Francisco Seals | 128 | 71 | .643 |
| Salt Lake City Bees | 116 | 84 | .580 |
| Seattle Indians | 103 | 91 | .531 |
| Los Angeles Angels | 105 | 93 | .530 |
| Portland Beavers | 92 | 104 | .469 |
| Oakland Oaks | 88 | 112 | .440 |
| Sacramento | 82 | 119 | .408 |
| Vernon Tigers | 80 | 120 | .400 |

== Players ==
=== Batting ===
Note: Pos = Position; G = Games played; AB = At bats; H = Hits; Avg. = Batting average; HR = Home runs; RBI = Runs batted in

| Pos | Player | G | AB | H | Avg. | HR | RBI |
|---|---|---|---|---|---|---|---|
| LF | Paul Waner | 174 | 699 | 280 | .401 | 11 | 130 |
| RF | Frank Brower | 186 | 705 | 255 | .362 | 36 | 163 |
| CF | Gene Valla | 177 | 769 | 256 | .333 | 6 | 72 |
| C | Sam Agnew | 122 | 384 | 125 | .326 | 20 | 85 |
| 1B | Babe Ellison | 174 | 708 | 230 | .325 | 22 | 160 |
| SS | Hal Rhyne | 188 | 724 | 228 | .315 | 3 | 97 |
| 2B | Pete Kilduff | 174 | 670 | 205 | .306 | 20 | 126 |
| OF | Tim Hendryx | 117 | 330 | 100 | .303 | 4 | 41 |
| 3B | Eddie Mulligan | 180 | 751 | 215 | .286 | 10 | 77 |
| C | Archie Yelle | 101 | 266 | 71 | .267 | 1 | 21 |

=== Pitching ===
Note: G = Games pitched; IP = Innings pitched; W = Wins; L = Losses; PCT = Win percentage; ERA = Earned run average

| Player | G | IP | W | L | PCT | ERA |
|---|---|---|---|---|---|---|
| Bob Geary | 50 | 287 | 20 | 12 | .625 | 4.01 |
| Ollie Mitchell | 43 | 277 | 20 | 8 | .714 | 4.29 |
| Doug McWeeny | 49 | 263 | 20 | 5 | .800 | 2.70 |
| Guy Williams | 46 | 246 | 21 | 10 | .677 | 3.84 |
| Marty Griffin | 43 | 209 | 16 | 4 | .800 | 4.26 |
| Jeff Pfeffer | 36 | 193 | 15 | 15 | .500 | 5.27 |
| Bill Crockett | 38 | 189 | 12 | 11 | .522 | 4.38 |
