= 1922 San Francisco Seals season =

1922 San Francisco Seals
- League: Pacific Coast League
- Ballpark: Recreation Park
- City: San Francisco
- Record: 128–72 (.640)
- League place: 1st
- Manager: Dots Miller

The 1922 San Francisco Seals season was the 20th season in the history of the San Francisco Seals baseball team. The 1922 team won the Pacific Coast League (PCL) pennant with a 128–72 record, the second best winning percentage in league history. The 1922 Seals also set a new PCL attendance record with 446,021 attending the club's home games.

The 1925 Seals were selected in 2003 by a panel of minor league experts as the eighth best team in the PCL's 100-year history. The team was also ranked No. 44 by Minor League Baseball in its ranking of the 100 greatest minor league teams in baseball history.

Dots Miller was hired as the club's manager in December 1921. Miller had been a major league infielder from 1909 to 1921 and was a member of the 1909 Pittsburgh Pirates team that defeated Ty Cobb's Detroit Tigers in the 1909 World Series.

Third baseman Willie Kamm, a San Francisco native, led the team with a .342 batting average, 20 home runs, 124 RBIs, and 137 runs scored. In May 1922, the Seals sold Kamm to the Chicago White Sox, effective at the start of the 1923 season, for $100,000 and two players. The $100,000 paid by the White Sox was the highest sum paid to that date for a minor league player. After his final game with the Seals, Kamm was honored in a ceremony at Recreation Park.

The pitching staff included three 20-game winners. Jim "Death Valley" Scott led the staff with 25 wins and a 2.22 earned run average (ERA). Ollie Mitchell won 24 games and Bob Geary 20.

== Players ==
=== Batting ===
Note: Pos = Position; G = Games played; AB = At bats; H = Hits; Avg. = Batting average; HR = Home runs; RBI = Runs batted in

Pos	Player	G	AB	H	Avg.	HR	RBI
1B	Babe Ellison	187	718	220	.306	16	141
SS	Hal Rhyne	189	699	199	.285	0	93
CF	Jimmy O'Connell	187	671	225	.335	13	92
3B	Willie Kamm	170	650	222	.342	20	124
2B	Pete Kilduff	176	616	177	.287	6	75
LF	Joe Kelly	156	573	191	.333	13	68
RF	Gene Valla	144	547	182	.333	1	48
C	Sam Agnew	118	389	131	.337	11	61
OF	Charlie See	109	352	108	.307	1	40

=== Pitching ===
Note: G = Games pitched; IP = Innings pitched; W = Wins; L = Losses; PCT = Win percentage; ERA = Earned run average; SO = Strikeouts

Player	G	IP	W	L	PCT	ERA	SO
Jim Scott	35	276	25	9	.735	2.22	75
Ollie Mitchell	40	289	24	7	.774	2.90	117
Bob Geary	43	264	20	9	.690	2.52	79
Doug McWeeny	31	175	15	7	.682	2.78	130
Ernie Alten	37	233	13	10	.565	3.55	67
Fritz Coumbe	39	180	10	7	.588	3.40	68
