= 1923 San Francisco Seals season =

American baseball team season

1923 San Francisco Seals
- League: Pacific Coast League
- Ballpark: Recreation Park
- City: San Francisco
- Record: 124–77 (.617)
- League place: 1st
- Managers: Dots Miller, Babe Ellison

The 1923 San Francisco Seals season was the 21st season in the history of the San Francisco Seals baseball team. The 1923 team won the Pacific Coast League (PCL) pennant with a 124–77 record.

Dots Miller began the season as the team's manager. However, he developed tuberculosis and resigned his position in July to seek treatment at a sanitarium in Saranac Lake, New York. He died there in September 1923.

When Miller resigned as manager, first baseman Babe Ellison became a player-manager. He compiled a .358 batting average and led the team with 23 home runs, 67 doubles, and a .564 slugging percentage.

Right fielder Paul Waner, playing his first season of professional baseball at age 20, led the 1923 Seals with a .369 batting average. Waner later played 15 years for the Pittsburgh Pirates and was inducted into the Baseball Hall of Fame in 1952.

Pitcher Harry Courtney led the PCL with a .766 winning percentage (19 wins, six losses) and ranked second in the league with a 2.80 earned run average (ERA). In addition, three other San Francisco pitchers (Red Shea, Bob Geary, and Doug McWeeny) won at least 20 games each.

== Players ==
=== Batting ===
Note: Pos = Position; G = Games played; AB = At bats; H = Hits; Avg. = Batting average; HR = Home runs; SLG = Slugging percentage

Pos	Player	G	AB	H	Avg.	HR	RBI
OF	Paul Waner	112	325	120	.369	3	.514
1B	Babe Ellison	192	757	271	.358	23	.564
LF	Joe Kelly	107	443	154	.348	5	.481
OF	Tim Hendryx	133	475	161	.339	6	.463
RF	Gene Valla	194	829	277	.334	1	.429
3B	Eddie Mulligan	155	620	204	.329	9	.434
2B	Pete Kilduff	161	622	204	.328	10	.477
OF	Pete Compton	134	527	171	.324	7	.454
C	Sam Agnew	110	369	115	.312	13	.491
SS	Hal Rhyne	168	611	181	.296	5	.376
C	Archie Yelle	106	356	100	.281	2	.365

=== Pitching ===
Note: G = Games pitched; IP = Innings pitched; W = Wins; L = Losses; PCT = Win percentage; ERA = Earned run average; SO = Strikeouts

Player	G	IP	W	L	PCT	ERA
Red Shea	44	291	21	10	.677	3.62
Bob Geary	42	262	21	11	.656	3.64
Doug McWeeny	48	253	20	12	.625	3.91
Harry Courtney	36	251	19	6	.760	2.80
Shovel Hodge	49	256	18	15	.545	3.48
Jim Scott	28	173	11	9	.550	4.06
Ollie Mitchell	41	204	10	9	.526	3.40
