= 1930 Hollywood Stars season =

1930 Hollywood Stars
- League: Pacific Coast League
- Ballpark: Wrigley Field
- City: Hollywood
- Record: 119–81
- League place: 1st
- Owner: Bill "Hardpan" Lane
- Managers: Ossie Vitt

The 1930 Hollywood Stars season, was the fifth season for the original Hollywood Stars baseball team. The team, which began in 1903 as the Sacramento Solons, moved to Hollywood in 1926 and played in the Pacific Coast League (PCL).

The 1930 PCL season ran from April 8 to October 19, 1930. The Stars, led by manager Ossie Vitt, finished first in the Pacific Coast League (PCL) with a 119–81 record. The PCL provided for a championship series to be played between the teams with best records in the first and second halves of the season. The Stars qualified for the championship series by compiling the best record in the second half of the season. In the championship series, the Stars and defeated the Los Angeles Angels, four games to one.

First baseman Mickey Heath appeared in 174 games, compiled a .324 batting average, led the team with 136 RBIs and 19 stolen bases, and led tied for PCL lead with 37 home runs.

Catcher Hank Severeid appeared in 129 games and led the team with a .367 batting average.

Jesse Hill led the team with a .592 slugging percentage and led the circuit with 13 triples.

Pitcher Ed Baecht compiled a 26-12 record and led the PCL with a 3.24 earned run average (ERA).

== Statistics ==
=== Batting ===
Note: Pos = Position; G = Games played; AB = At bats; H = Hits; Avg. = Batting average; HR = Home runs; SLG = Slugging percentage; RBI = Runs batted in; SB = Stolen bases

Pos	Player	G	AB	H	Avg.	HR	SLG	RBI	SB
C	Hank Severeid	129	376	138	.367	13	.540	93	6
C	Johnny Bassler	123	348	127	.365	0	.422	71	3
	Jesse Hill	115	480	171	.356	18	.592	71	10
RF	Bill Rumler	95	346	122	.353	14	.558	82	8
OF	Harry Green	123	431	142	.329	14	.501	80	4
CF	Cleo Carlyle	172	616	201	.326	12	.464	.97	14
1B	Mickey Heath	174	546	177	.324	37	.568	136	19
2B	Otis Brannan	191	742	228	.307	18	.450	130	6
3b	Mike Gazella	171	650	197	.303	11	.428	94	9
P	Frank Shellenback	54	129	36	.279	4	.411	24	1
SS	Dud Lee	187	717	197	.275	3	.332	57	27

=== Pitching ===
Note: G = Games pitched; IP = Innings pitched; W = Wins; L = Losses; PCT = Win percentage; ERA = Earned run average; SO = Strikeouts

Player	G	IP	W	L	PCT	ERA	SO
Jim Turner	36	258.0	21	9	.700	3.80	92
Frank Shellenback	36	252.0	19	7	.731	4.64	111
George Hollerson	49	203.0	13	10	.565	6.03	70
Emil Yde	39	179.0	13	10	.565	5.33	118
Buzz Wetzel	44	200.0	13	11	.542	5.58	87
Augie Johns	42	195.0	12	11	.522	4.38	96
Hank Hulvey	38	171.0	11	10	.524	4.89	69
Gordon Rhodes	20	117.0	9	2	.818	5.23	76
Vance Page	41	172.0	8	12	.400	3.87	39
