= 1909 San Francisco Seals season =

1909 San Francisco Seals
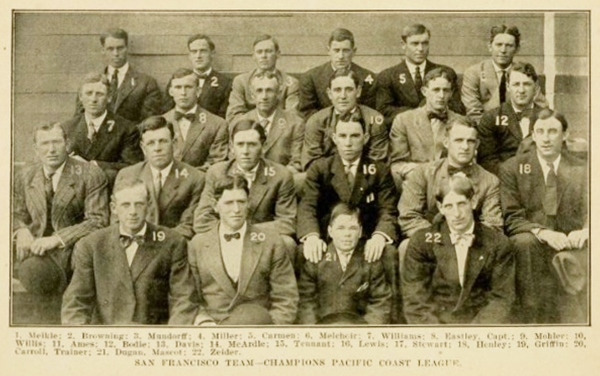
- 1909 San Francisco Seals
- League: Pacific Coast League
- Ballpark: Recreation Park
- City: San Francisco
- Record: 132–80
- League place: 1st
- Managers: Dan Long

The 1909 San Francisco Seals season was the seventh season in the history of the San Francisco Seals baseball team. The 1909 team won the Pacific Coast League (PCL) pennant with a 132–80 record. Dan Long was the team's manager

The 1925 Seals were selected in 2003 by a panel of minor league experts as the tenth best team in the PCL's 100-year history. The team was also ranked No. 71 by baseball historians Bill Weiss and Marshall Wright in their ranking of the 100 best teams in Minor League Baseball history.

== Pitchers ==
The pitching staff included two 30-game winners.

Frank Browning led the PCL and all of Minor League Baseball with 32 wins and a 2.00 earned run average (ERA). Browning later played for the Detroit Tigers and performed as part of a vaudeville quartet.

Cack Henley finished second with a 31–10 record and a 1.56 ERA. On June 8, 1909, Henley pitched a 24-inning, complete-game shutout at Freeman's Park in Oakland. Jimmy Wiggs pitched 23 scoreless innings for Oakland and lost on an unearned run in the 24th inning.

== Position players ==
Right fielder Henry Melchior appeared in 195 games for the Seals, tallied 47 extra base hits and 27 stolen bases, and led the PCL with a .298 batting average. Melchior continued to play on the West Coast until 1915 but never played in the major leagues.

Outfielder Doc Miller compiled a .347 batting average for the Seals but did not have enough at bats (he had 219) to qualify for the batting title. Miller later played five years in the major leagues.

Third baseman Rollie Zeider compiled a .289 batting average and led the PCL with 93 stolen bases and 141 runs scored. Zeider later played nine seasons in the major leagues.

Left fielder Ping Bodie, a San Francisco native, led the team with 10 home runs. He hit 30 home runs for the Seals in 1910 and later played nine seasons in the majors.

== 1909 PCL standings ==
| Team | W | L | Pct. | GB |
|---|---|---|---|---|
| San Francisco Seals | 132 | 80 | .622 | -- |
| Portland Beavers | 112 | 87 | .563 | 13.5 |
| Los Angeles Angels | 118 | 97 | .549 | 15.5 |
| Sacramento Sacts | 97 | 107 | .475 | 31.0 |
| Oakland Oaks | 88 | 125 | .413 | 44.5 |
| Vernon Tigers | 80 | 131 | .379 | 51.0 |

== Statistics ==
=== Batting ===
Note: Pos = Position; G = Games played; AB = At bats; H = Hits; Avg. = Batting average; HR = Home runs; SLG = Slugging percentage

| Pos | Player | G | AB | H | Avg. | HR | SLG |
|---|---|---|---|---|---|---|---|
| OF | Henry Melchior | 195 | 692 | 206 | .298 | 5 | 386 |
| 3B, 2B, OF | Rollie Zeider | 189 | 705 | 204 | .289 | 2 | 374 |
| OF, P | Ping Bodie | 157 | 543 | 135 | .249 | 10 | .401 |
| 3B | Howard Mundorff | 102 | 320 | 85 | .266 | 0 | .328 |
| C | Claude Berry | 166 | 577 | 141 | .244 | 1 | .289 |
| 1B | Tom Tennant | 188 | 692 | 159 | .230 | 2 | .289 |
| OF | Jim Lewis | 97 | 303 | 69 | .228 | 0 | .231 |
| SS | Harry McArdle | 207 | 690 | 136 | .197 | 0 | .252 |
| C, 1B, OF | Nick Williams | 114 | 345 | 77 | .223 | 0 | .275 |
| 2B | Kid Mohler | 184 | 607 | 117 | .193 | 1 | .247 |

=== Pitching ===
Note: G = Games pitched; IP = Innings pitched; W = Wins; L = Losses; PCT = Win percentage; ERA = Earned run average

| Player | G | IP | W | L | PCT | ERA |
|---|---|---|---|---|---|---|
| Frank Browning | 54 | 432.0 | 32 | 16 | .667 | 2.00 |
| Cack Henley | 46 | 386.2 | 31 | 10 | .756 | 1.56 |
| Ralph Willis | 34 | 281.2 | 21 | 9 | .700 | 2.01 |
| Pat Eastley | 41 | 326.0 | 19 | 16 | .543 | 2.13 |
| Ed Griffin | 26 | 200.1 | 12 | 10 | .545 | 2.52 |
| Joe Corbett | 12 | 91.0 | 4 | 7 | .364 | 2.67 |
