= 1920 Vernon Tigers season =

1920 Vernon Tigers
- League: Pacific Coast League
- Ballpark: Maier Park, Washington Park
- City: Vernon, California
- Record: 110–88
- League place: 1st
- Owners: E. R. Maier
- Managers: Bill Essick

The 1920 Vernon Tigers season was the 12th season in the history of the Vernon Tigers baseball team. Playing in the Pacific Coast League (PCL), the team compiled a 110–88 record and won the PCL pennant. Vernon compiled the best record in the PCL for a third consecutive seasons under manager Bill Essick.

The Tigers' championship was marred by revelations during the 1920 season of a gambling scandal involving first baseman Babe Borton. Borton admitted paying money during the 1919 pennant race to three players on the Salt Lake City Bees to throw games against the Tigers. Borton claimed that bribes had also been paid by a teammate to Portland and Seattle players, that the bribes were paid out of a pool of money funded by numerous teammates, and that the bribes were instigated by Vernor manager Bill Essick. Borton was released by the Tigers in August 1920 and never again played professional baseball. Borton was charged by a Los Angeles grand jury in December 1920 with criminal conspiracy for his role in the bribery scandal.

== 1920 PCL standings ==
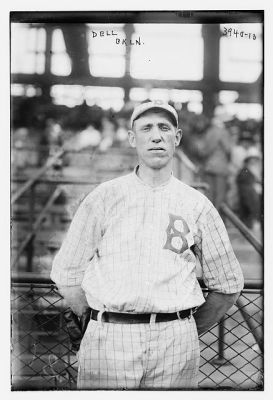
Vernon's pitching ace Wheezer Dell

Team	W	L	Pct.	GB
Vernon Tigers	110	88	.556	--
Seattle Rainiers	102	91	.528	5.5
San Francisco Seals	103	96	.518	7.5
Los Angeles Angels	101	95	.515	8.0
Salt Lake City Bees	95	92	.508	9.5
Oakland Oaks	95	103	.480	15.0
Sacramento Senators	89	109	.449	21.0
Portland Beavers	81	102	.443	21.5

== Statistics ==
=== Batting ===
Note: Pos = Position; G = Games played; AB = At bats; H = Hits; Avg. = Batting average; HR = Home runs; SLG = Slugging percentage

Pos	Player	G	AB	H	Avg.	HR	SLG
1B	Babe Borton	123	439	143	.326	10	.487
2B	Bob Fisher	190	787	244	.310	2	.395
3B	Red Smith	186	616	180	.292	1	.351
LF	Hugh High	177	664	191	.288	4	.373
CF	Chet Chadbourne	195	775	222	.286	3	.379
LF	Scotty Alcock	74	149	42	.282	0	.336
RF	Tom Long	124	392	107	.273	0	.347
1B	Stump Edington	124	394	107	.272	3	.343
SS	Johnny Mitchell	196	790	213	.270	1	.358
1B	Art Mueller	45	161	40	.248	0	.323
C	Al DeVormer	159	550	133	.242	3	.311
RF	Harry Morse	68	196	45	.230	0	.281
P	Wheezer Dell	55	135	30	.222	0	.237

=== Pitching ===
Note: G = Games pitched; IP = Innings pitched; W = Wins; L = Losses; PCT = Win percentage; ERA = Earned run average; SO = Strikeouts

Player	G	IP	W	L	PCT	ERA	SO
Wheezer Dell	54	370.0	27	15	.643	2.99	
Willie Mitchell	52	348.1	25	13	.658	2.38	
Frank Shellenback	47	298.2	18	12	.600	2.71	
Bill Piercy	41	243.2	10	17	.370	2.62	
Byron Houck	45	278.0	19	16	.543	3.88	
Walt Smallwood	43	164.2	10	10	.500	3.94	
Art Fromme	21	107.2	6	8	.429	2.67	
