= 1906 Portland Beavers season =

1906 Portland Beavers
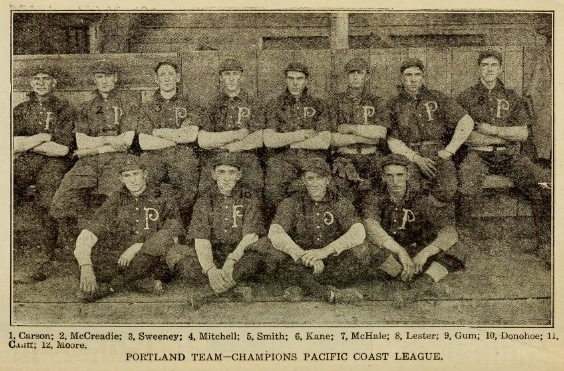
- 1906 Portland Beavers
- League: Pacific Coast League
- Ballpark: Vaughn Street Park
- City: Portland, Oregon
- Record: 114–58 (.663)
- League place: 1st
- Owners: William Wallace McCredie
- Managers: Walt McCredie

The 1906 Portland Beavers season was the fourth season in the history of the Portland Beavers baseball team. The 1906 team won the Pacific Coast League (PCL) pennant with a 114–58 record (.663 winning percentage). The team played its home games at Vaughn Street Park. The 1906 season was the first in which the team played under the name "Beavers", having been previously known as the "Browns" and "Giants".

The 1906 Beavers were selected in 2003 by a panel of minor league experts as the sixth best team in the PCL's 100-year history. The team was also ranked No. 31 by Minor League Baseball in its ranking of the 100 greatest minor league teams in baseball history.

The Beavers were in Oakland, California, when the 1906 San Francisco earthquake struck the coast of Northern California. The season was interrupted for five weeks after the earthquake.

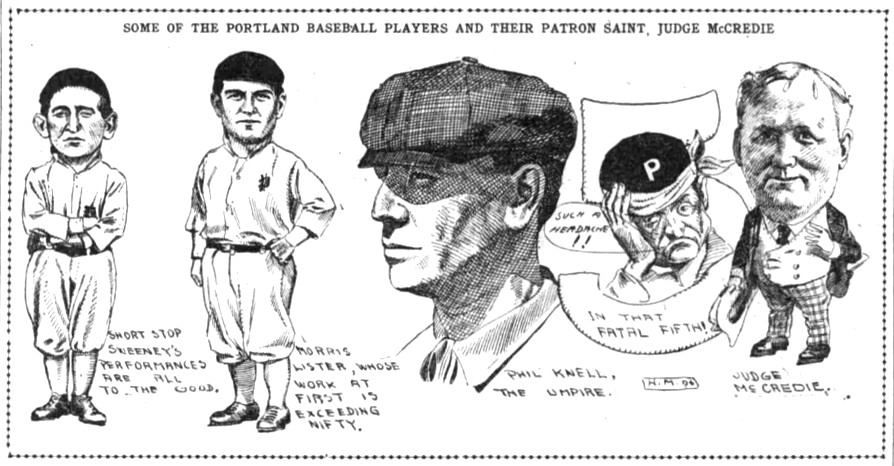
Cartoon of Judge McCredie with his players

The team was owned by Judge William Wallace McCredie, who later represented the State of Washington in the U.S. House of Representatives. McCredie also served as the club's president while his son, Hugh, was the business manager and his wife, Alice, managed the ticket office. His nephew Walt McCredie played in the National League, batting .324 in 1903, but joined the Portland club as player-manager in 1904 after his uncle became the owner. Walt McCredie was both the manager and one of the starting outfielders in 1906, leading the team to the pennant while also compiling a .306 batting average.

The star of the team was outfielder Mike Mitchell. Mitchell was credited by Bill James as having one of the best outfield arms of the Deadball Era. In 1906, he won the PCL batting championship with a .339 batting average and also led the league in home runs and slugging percentage.

Enon Califf, Ben Henderson, and "Vinegar Bill" Essick led the pitching staff. Califf, an Oregon native, compiled a 34–14 record with 40 complete games and a 2.17 earned run average (ERA) in 53 games (46 as a starter). Henderson went 29–10 with 38 complete games and a 1.60 ERA in 41 games. Essick led the PCL with a .760 winning percentage (19 wins, 6 losses).

== 1906 PCL standings ==
Team	W	L	Pct.	GB
Portland Beavers	114	58	.663	--
Seattle Indians	97	83	.539	21.0
San Francisco Seals	92	81	.532	22.5
Los Angeles Angels	93	91	.505	27.0
Oakland Oaks	79	106	.427	41.5
Fresno Raisin Eaters	64	120	.348	56.0

== Statistics ==
=== Batting ===
Note: Pos = Position; G = Games played; AB = At bats; H = Hits; Avg. = Batting average; HR = Home runs; SLG = Slugging percentage

Pos	Player	G	AB	H	Avg.	HR	SLG
OF	Mike Mitchell	164	611	207	.339	7	.466
OF	Jim McHale	172	687	191	.278	2	.371
OF	Walt McCredie	157	564	172	.305	1	.372
SS	Bill Sweeney	169	601	166	.276	0	.359
3B	Jud Smith	143	545	151	.277	0	.343
1B	Pete Lister	159	546	127	.233	0	.284
2B	Charley Moore	117	407	105	.258	0	
C	Larry McLean	88	287	102	.355	0	.456
C/2B	Pat Donahue	116	389	86	.221	1	.280

=== Pitching ===
Note: G = Games pitched; IP = Innings pitched; W = Wins; L = Losses; PCT = Win percentage; ERA = Earned run average; SO = Strikeouts

Player	G	IP	W	L	PCT	ERA	SO
Enon Califf	46	402.2	34	14	.708	2.17	173
Ben Henderson	38	353.2	29	10	.744	1.60	215
Ned Garvin	45	351.1	20	19	.513		242
"Vinegar Bill" Essick	26	235.1	19	6	.760	1.68	167
Frank Gum	25	213.2	16	7	.696	2.06	146
