= 1917 San Francisco Seals season =

1917 San Francisco Seals
- League: Pacific Coast League
- Ballpark: Recreation Park
- City: San Francisco
- Record: 119–93
- League place: 1st
- Owners: Henry Berry
- Managers: Harry Wolverton, Jerry Downs

The 1915 San Francisco Seals season was the 13th season in the history of the San Francisco Seals baseball team. The team won the Pacific Coast League (PCL) pennant with a 119–93 record. The season ran from April 3 to October 28, 1917.

Harry Wolverton began the season as the team's manager. On June 17, however, team owner Henry Berry fired Wolverton, stating that he could not get along with Wolverton in a business way. Jerry Downs took over as player-manager after Wolverton.

Pitcher Eric Erickson led the PCL in both wins (30) and earned run average (1.93).

== 1917 PCL standings ==
Team	W	L	Pct.	GB
San Francisco Seals	119	93	.561	--
Los Angeles Angels	116	94	.552	
Salt Lake City Bees	102	97	.513	
Portland Beavers	98	102	.490	
Oakland Oaks	103	108	.488	
Vernon Tigers	84	128	.396	

== Statistics ==
=== Batting ===
Note: Pos = Position; G = Games played; AB = At bats; H = Hits; Avg. = Batting average; HR = Home runs; SLG = Slugging percentage

Pos	Player	G	AB	H	Avg.	HR	SLG
RF	Mike Fitzgerald	179	704	228	.324	2	.405
LF	Biff Schaller	181	657	206	.314	4	.423
CF	George Maisel	169	616	190	.308	0	.359
3B	Charlie Pick	209	795	240	.302	0	.376
1B	Phil Koerner	211	741	204	.275	8	.387
C	Del Baker	121	349	93	.266	1	.321
CF	Jack Calvo	148	498	131	.263	1	.329
SS	Roy Corhan	210	680	172	.253	2	.306
C	Red McKee	68	209	56	.268	1	.330
2B	Jerry Downs	166	610	146	.239	1	.295

=== Pitching ===
Note: G = Games pitched; IP = Innings pitched; W = Wins; L = Losses; PCT = Win percentage; ERA = Earned run average; SO = Strikeouts

Player	G	IP	W	L	PCT	ERA	SO
Eric Erickson	62	443.2	31	15	.674	1.93	
Spider Baum	50	352.1	24	17	.585	2.50	
Red Oldham	48	343.2	18	19	.486	2.88	
Luther Smith	49	293.0	17	15	.533	2.33	
