= 1935 San Francisco Seals season =

Baseball team sports season

1935 San Francisco Seals
- League: Pacific Coast League
- Ballpark: Seals Stadium
- City: San Francisco
- Record: 103–70
- League place: 1st
- Managers: Lefty O'Doul

The 1935 San Francisco Seals season was the 33rd season in the history of the San Francisco Seals baseball team. The team compiled a 103–70 record and won the PCL pennant.

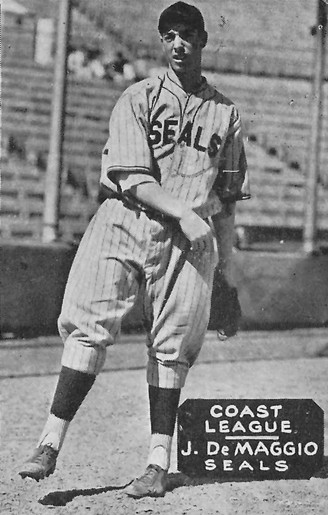
Joe DiMaggio with the Seals

In January 1935, the Seals hired Lefty O'Doul as the team's player-manager. O'Doul had played for the Seals at the start of his playing career and went on to play 11 years in the major leagues, winning National League batting titles in 1929 and 1932. At age 38, he appeared in 68 games for the 1936 Seals, compiling a .269 batting average. He continued as the Seals' manager through the 1951 season.

Outfielder Joe DiMaggio, a 20-year-old native of the San Francisco Bay Area, was the team's brightest star. Though he finished one point behind Ox Eckhardt in the competition for PCL batting championship, DiMaggio was selected as the PCL's most valuable player, led the league in RBIs (154), runs scored (173), and triples (18), and ranked second with 34 home runs. DiMaggio had been sold to the New York Yankees in November 1934, but on the condition that he would remain with the Seals for the 1935 season.

In the PCL championship series, played in late September, the Seals defeated the Los Angeles Angels four games to two.

== Players ==
=== Batting ===
Note: Pos = Position; G = Games played; AB = At bats; H = Hits; Avg. = Batting average; HR = Home runs; SLG = Slugging percentage

Pos	Player	G	AB	H	Avg.	HR	SLG
OF	Joe DiMaggio	172	679	270	.398	34	.672
C	Joe Becker	75	207	77	.372	0	.483
C	Larry Woodall	79	257	91	.354	0	.412
	Steve Barath	100	218	72	.330	11	.471
	Lonny Backer	154	525	163	.310	0	.392
1B	Les Powers	171	704	217	.308	4	.402
	Ted Norbert	149	524	158	.302	11	.471
IF	Art Garibaldi	171	731	218	.298	7	.432
SS	Hal Rhyne	150	523	154	.294	1	.373
CF	Joe Marty	159	609	175	.287	6	.417

=== Pitching ===
Note: G = Games pitched; IP = Innings pitched; W = Wins; L = Losses; PCT = Win percentage; ERA = Earned run average

Player	G	IP	W	L	PCT	ERA
Sam Gibson	38	252	22	4	.846	3.46
Win Ballou	33	220	18	8	.692	3.27
