= 1914 Portland Beavers season =

1914 Portland Beavers
- League: Pacific Coast League
- Ballpark: Vaughn Street Park
- City: Portland, Oregon
- Record: 113–84
- League place: 1st
- Owners: William Wallace McCredie
- Managers: Walt McCredie

The 1914 Portland Beavers season was the 12th season in the history of the Portland Beavers baseball team. Under the leadership of manager Walt McCredie, the team compiled a 113–84 record and won the Pacific Coast League (PCL) pennant. The Beavers won five PCL pennants between 1906 and 1914.

Second baseman Bill Rodgers was the team captain and led the team with 227 hits. Outfielder Ty Lober led the PCL with nine home runs, and shortstop Art Kores led the league with 54 doubles and 21 triples.

== 1914 PCL standings ==
Team	W	L	Pct.	GB
Portland Beavers	113	84	.574	--
Los Angeles Angels	116	94	.552	
San Francisco Seals	115	96	.545	
Venice Tigers	113	98	.536	
Sacramento Sacts	90	121	.427	
Oakland Oaks	79	133	.373	

== Statistics ==
=== Batting ===
Note: Pos = Position; G = Games played; AB = At bats; H = Hits; Avg. = Batting average; HR = Home runs; SLG = Slugging percentage; SB = Stolen bases

Pos	Player	G	AB	H	Avg.	HR	SLG	SB
C	Gus Fisher	139	440	156	.355	1	.455	
1B, RF	Fred Derrick	144	520	155	.298	4	.385	
3B, 1B	Art Kores	187	692	205	.296	5	.457	
CF	Buddy Ryan	150	530	156	.294	3	.394	
RF	Walt Doan	172	639	187	.293	3	.374	
2B	Bill Rodgers	200	773	226	.292	2	.349	
SS	Dave Bancroft	177	668	185	.277	2	.380	
3B, SS	Bobby Davis	124	366	91	.249	0	.306	
LF	Ty Lober	177	582	143	.246	9	.368	
LF, CF	Billy Speas	125	416	115	.276	1	.358	
C	George Yantz	65	164	34	.207	0	.268	

=== Pitching ===
Note: G = Games pitched; IP = Innings pitched; W = Wins; L = Losses; PCT = Win percentage; ERA = Earned run average; SO = Strikeouts

Player	G	IP	W	L	PCT	ERA	SO
Irv Higginbotham	60	417.2	31	20	.608	2.28	
Harry Krause	46	356.1	22	18	.550	2.22	
Elmer Rieger	37	195.1	12	11	.522	2.72	
Elmer Martinoni	33	176.1	11	2	.846	2.19	
Rube Evans	33	158.1	11	10	.524	2.61	
Hi West	27	185.1	11	10	.524	2.82	
