= 1956 Los Angeles Angels season =

1956 Los Angeles Angels
- League: Pacific Coast League
- Ballpark: Wrigley Field
- City: Los Angeles
- Record: 107–61
- League place: 1st
- Managers: Bob Scheffing

The 1956 Los Angeles Angels season was the 54th season in the history of the Los Angeles Angels baseball team. The 1954 team won the Pacific Coast League (PCL) pennant with a 107–61 record. Bob Scheffing was the team's manager. The team played its home games at Wrigley Field in Los Angeles.

In 1993, sportswriter John Schulian wrote a feature story in Sports Illustrated about the 1956 Angeles, opining that no minor league club ever played the game better. Gene Mauch, who played second base for the team and later managed in the majors, was interviewed by Schulian and recalled: "I might be prejudiced, but I think it was the best minor league team ever put together. I saw some teams in the big leagues that couldn't play as well. Hell, I managed two of them."

First baseman Steve Bilko received the Pacific Coast League Most Valuable Player Award and was also named Minor League Baseball's player of the year. He also won the PCL Triple Crown with a .360 batting average, 55 home runs, and 164 RBIs.

In addition to Bilko, five other Angels hit 20 or more home runs. Gene Mauch hit .348 with 20 home runs. In his book on the 1956 Angels, Gaylon H. White wrote: "Mauch's greatest value was as a leader. He was a master at devising trick plays, stealing opponents' signs and, if necessary, getting in the face of a teammate."

While Dave Hillman won 20 games for the Angels, pitching was the team's weakness. In his history of the Angels, Dick Beverage wrote: "The pitching staff was subpar and, as a result, the 1956 Angels were probably a level below the greatest teams of PCL history."

Angels players took eight of 14 spots the PCL All-Star team selected by sports writers in November 1956. The honorees were Steve Bilko at first base, Mauch at second base, Casey Wise at shortstop, Jim Bolger and Bob Speake in the outfield, El Tappe at catcher, Dave Hillman as a pitcher, and Piper Davis as the utility infielder.

== Statistics ==
=== Batting ===
Note: Pos = Position; G = Games played; AB = At bats; H = Hits; Avg. = Batting average; HR = Home runs; RBI = Runs batted in

Pos	Player	G	AB	H	Avg.	HR	RBI
SS	Casey Wise	168	705	202	.287	7	60
1B	Steve Bilko	162	597	215	.360	55	164
RF, CF	Jim Bolger	165	592	193	.326	28	147
LF, CF	Bob Speake	158	580	174	.300	25	111
2B	Gene Mauch	146	566	197	.348	20	84
3B	George Freese	137	474	138	.291	22	113
CF	Gale "Windy" Wade	101	383	112	.292	20	67
C	El Tappe	100	303	81	.267	3	36
C	Joe Hannah	93	239	65	.272	1	33
LF	Bob Coats	103	237	75	.316	0	29
1B, 3B	Piper Davis	64	152	48	.316	6	24
RF, LF	Eddie Haas	41	149	41	.275	4	19

=== Pitching ===
Note: G = Games pitched; IP = Innings pitched; W = Wins; L = Losses; PCT = Win percentage; ERA = Earned run average; SO = Strikeouts

Player	G	IP	W	L	PCT	ERA	SO
Dave Hillman	33	210.1	21	7	.750	3.38	130
Gene Fodge	44	192.0	19	7	.731	4.31	122
Dick Drott	35	196.2	13	10	.565	4.39	184
Bob Anderson	70	105.1	12	4	.750	2.65	61
Marino "Chick" Pieretti	38	156.0	7	9	.439	4.90	68
Bob Thorpe	29	155.2	7	7	.500	4.86	77
