= Fay Thomas =

American baseball player (1903–1990)

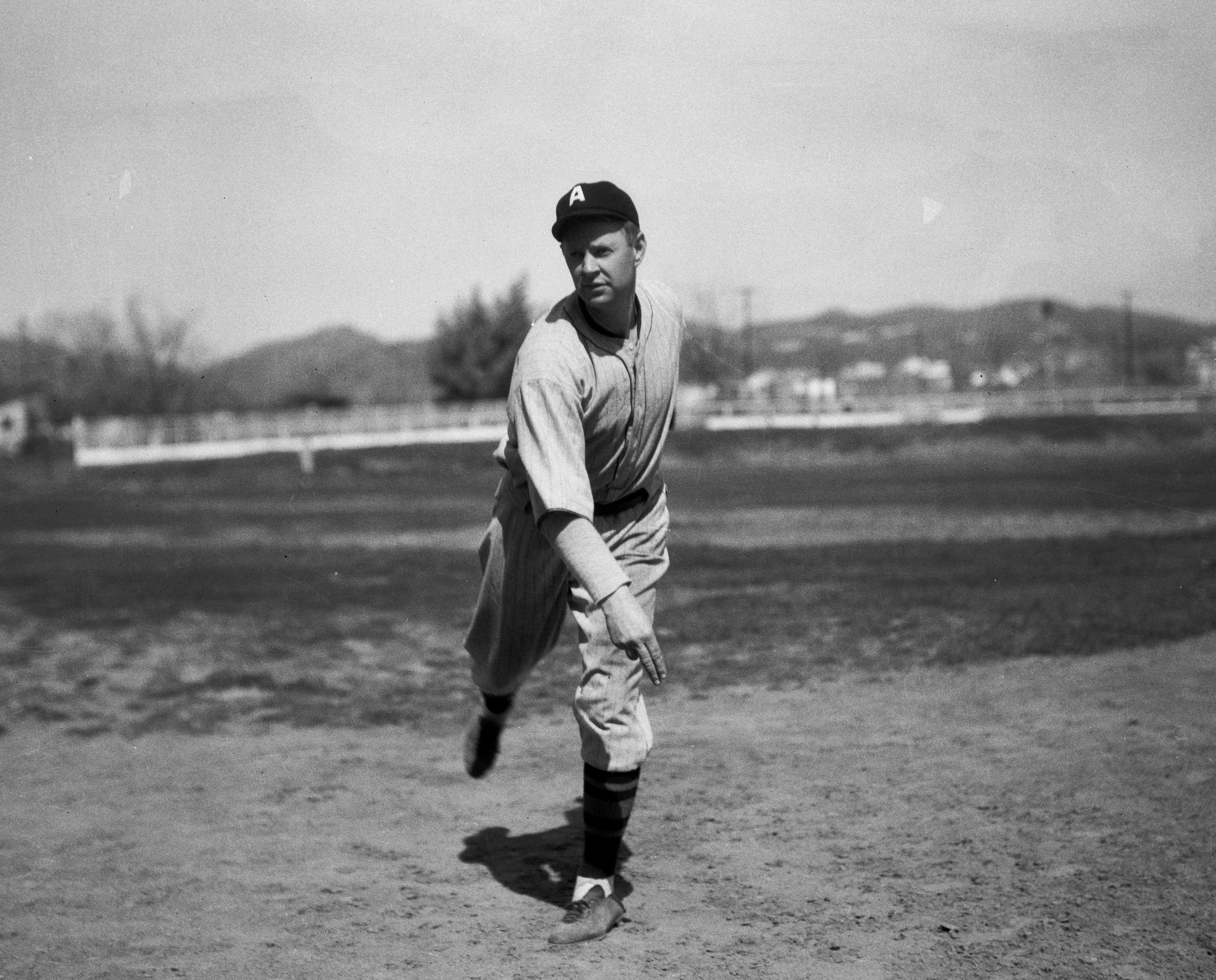
- Pitcher
- Born: October 10, 1903; Holyrood, Kansas, U.S.
- Died: August 12, 1990 (aged 86); Chatsworth, California, U.S.
- Batted: Right Threw: Right

MLB debut
- June 27, 1927, for the New York Giants

Last MLB appearance
- September 29, 1935, for the St. Louis Browns

MLB statistics
- Win–loss record: 9-20
- Earned run average: 4.95
- Strikeouts: 112
- Stats at Baseball Reference

Teams
- New York Giants (1927); Cleveland Indians (1931); Brooklyn Dodgers (1932); St. Louis Browns (1935)

Fay Wesley (Scow) Thomas (October 10, 1903 – August 12, 1990) was an American pitcher in Major League Baseball. He pitched for four teams from 1927 to 1935. He also pitched for five teams in the Pacific Coast League from 1930 to 1943 and was elected to the Pacific Coast League Hall of Fame in 2004. He attended the University of Southern California.
