= Dick Ward =

American baseball player (1909–1966)

- Dick Ward with Los Angeles, c. 1933
- Pitcher
- Born: May 21, 1909; Herrick, South Dakota
- Died: May 30, 1966 (aged 57); Freeland, Washington
- Batted: Right Threw: Right

MLB debut
- May 3, 1934, for the Chicago Cubs

Last MLB appearance
- July 23, 1935, for the St. Louis Cardinals

MLB statistics
- Win–loss record: 0–0
- Earned run average: 3.00
- Strikeouts: 1
- Stats at Baseball Reference

Teams
- Chicago Cubs (1934); St. Louis Cardinals (1935)

Richard Ole Ward (May 21, 1909 – May 30, 1966) was a Major League Baseball pitcher who played in 1934 and 1935 with the Chicago Cubs and the St. Louis Cardinals. He batted and threw right-handed. In 2 seasons, he appeared in 4 games, pitching 6 innings, posting a 3.00 earned run average, walking 3 while striking out 1.

He was born in Herrick, South Dakota, and died in Freeland, Washington.
