= Chutes Park =

Former amusement park and baseball stadium in Los Angeles

Coordinates: 34.030773°N 118.267197°W

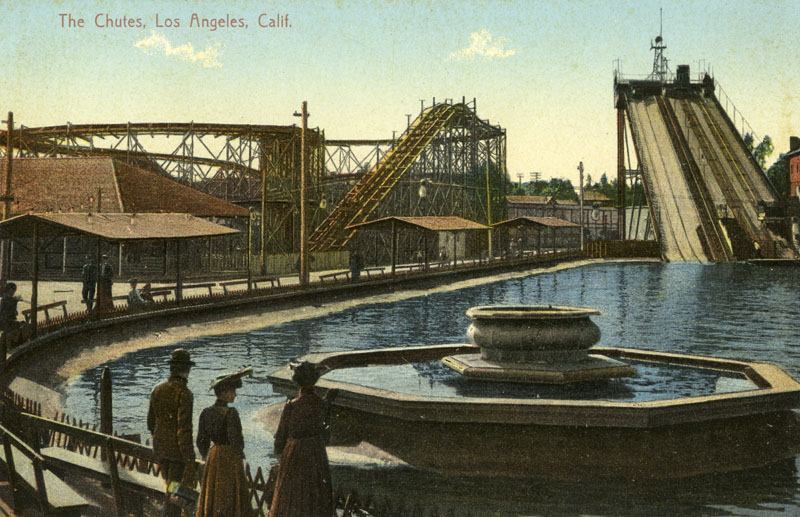
Postcard, c.1906

Chutes Park was an amusement park in Los Angeles, California which began as a trolley park in 1886. It was developed into a 35-acre (140,000 m^{2}) amusement park bounded by Grand Avenue on the west, Main Street on the east, Washington Boulevard on the north and 21st Street on the south. At various times it included rides, animal exhibits, a theater, and a baseball park. In 1910 the park was sold to new owners (including Frederick Ingersoll) and reopened as Luna Park. The amusement park closed in 1914.

The name Chutes Park was also applied to the baseball park which opened around 1900 and was the original home of the Los Angeles Angels of the Pacific Coast League.

== History ==
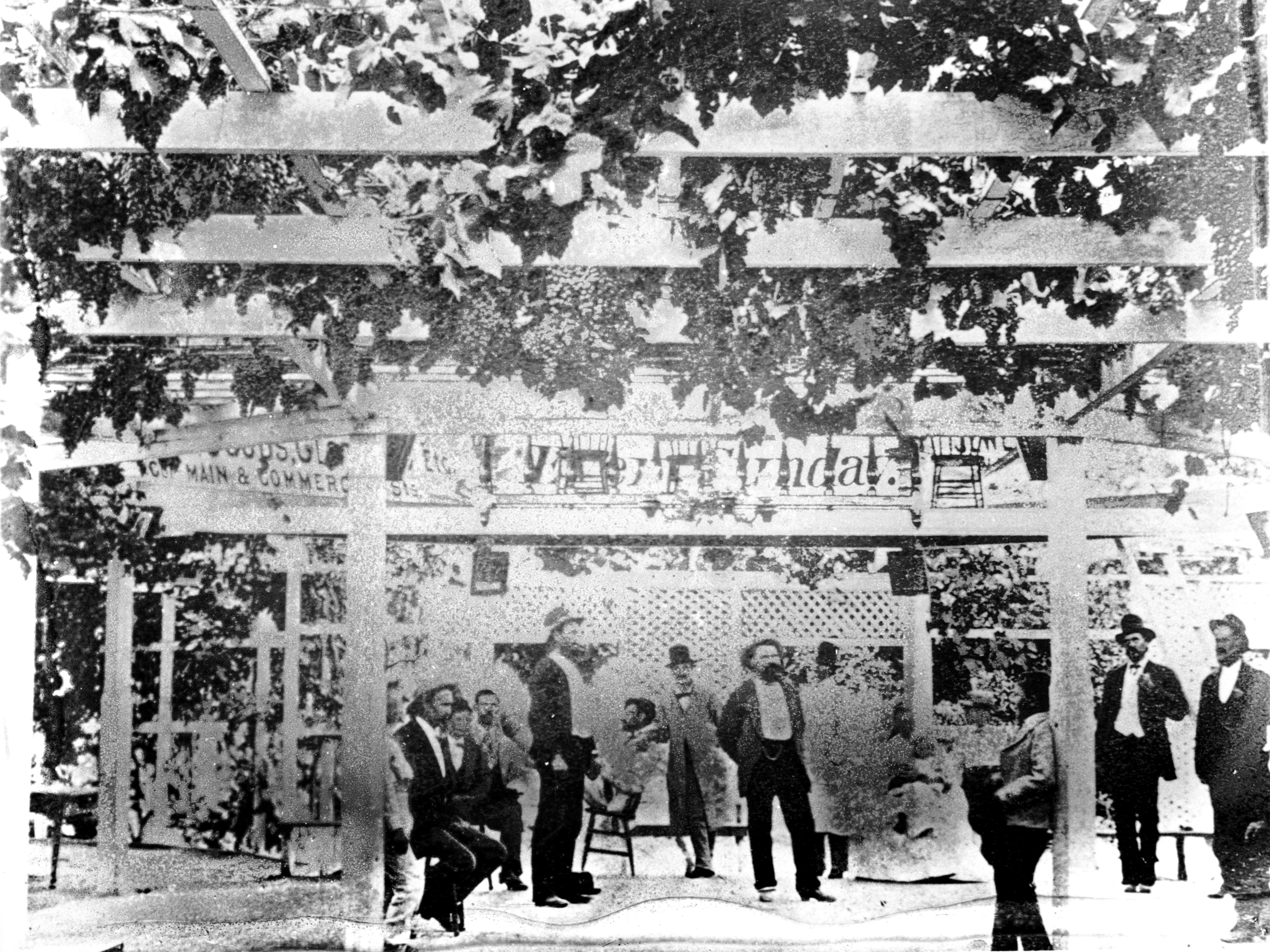
Washington Gardens c.1876

David V. Waldron bought about 35 acres (140,000 m^{2}) at Washington and Main and began to develop the property in 1887. It had previously been the site of a hotel. He also made a business arrangement to establish a horse-drawn rail line to connect to the city streetcar lines because the location was outside of the Los Angeles city limits. He began weekly variety shows in a small pavilion, brought in animals for display, and planted an orange grove.

Unfortunately, the park was allowed to decline and by the late 1890s was seldom used. In 1899, however, the property was sold to new owners which created the Los Angeles County Improvement Co. They built a new theater and baseball park, and brought in new rides.

== The rides ==
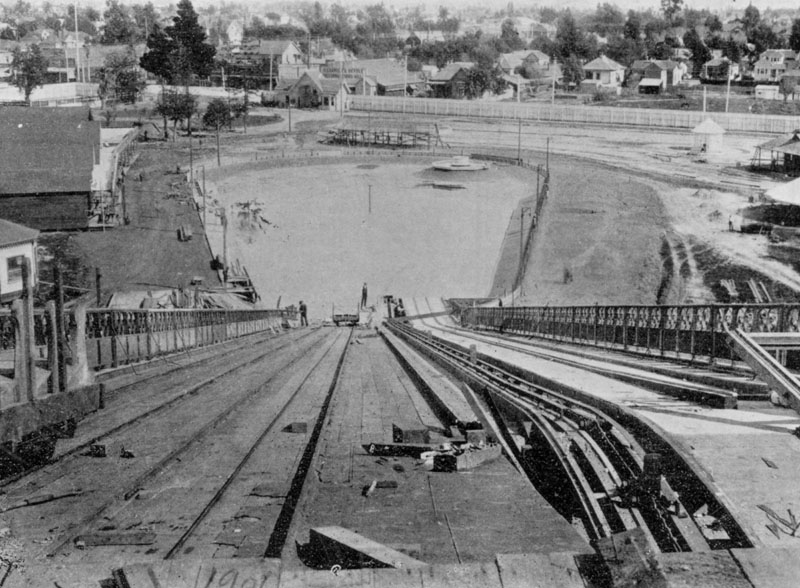
View from the chute

During its heyday from 1887 to 1914, the park featured such rides as a roller coaster, a chutes water slide that dropped riders in boats from a 75-foot (23 m) tower into a manmade lake, and a miniature railroad. State-of-the-art features included the park's electrically powered merry-go-round, and an electric engine that pulled the boats back up from the lake to the tower.

In October 1903, the operators added a steel-framed figure-eight roller coaster.

== Attractions ==
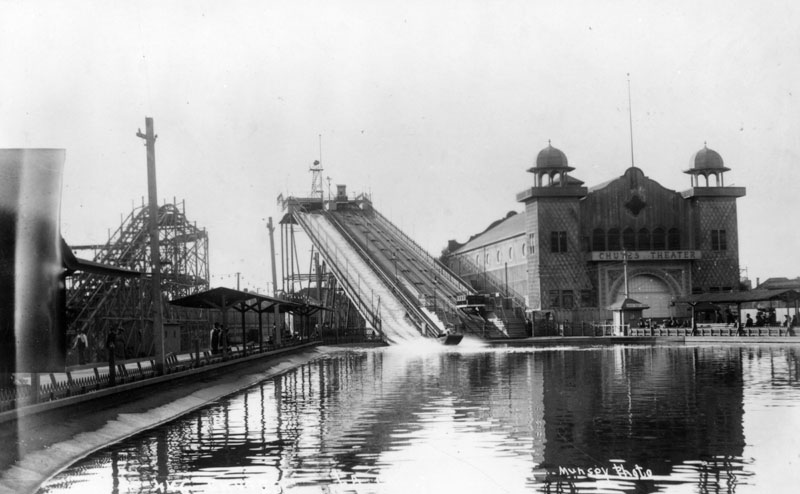
View showing theater

The site also included, at various times, such exotic diversions as a seal pond, ostriches, House of Trouble, and Cave of the Winds. By 1901, it also had a 4,000-seat theater and a baseball park that seated 10,000.

The Los Angeles County Improvement Co. added a fishing pond, a small circus, hot-air balloon rides, the Catalina Marine Band, and a small railroad that followed the outer perimeter of the park.

== The baseball park ==
By 1900, the baseball diamond was completed on the northern end of the park (Washington bordering the third base line), with a team to play in the new California League. It would be the first team to be called the Los Angeles Angels. It was also home of the Vernon Tigers. Following games, a gate in the center field fence was opened and fans were allowed to enter the theme park.

The Chutes Park ballfield was also sometimes called Washington Park. It was replaced by what the newspapers termed a "new" Washington Park in 1911, which had been built just south and east of the old one, and overlaying both the old outfield and the former waterslide area. The new ballpark was expanded for the 1913 season, supplanting most if not all of the former amusement park. The Chutes / Washington area was abandoned entirely when the Angels moved to Wrigley Field at 42nd Street and Avalon Boulevard. The Chutes Park site is now occupied by the Metropolitan Courthouse of the Los Angeles County Superior Court, as well as commercial space and parking lots.

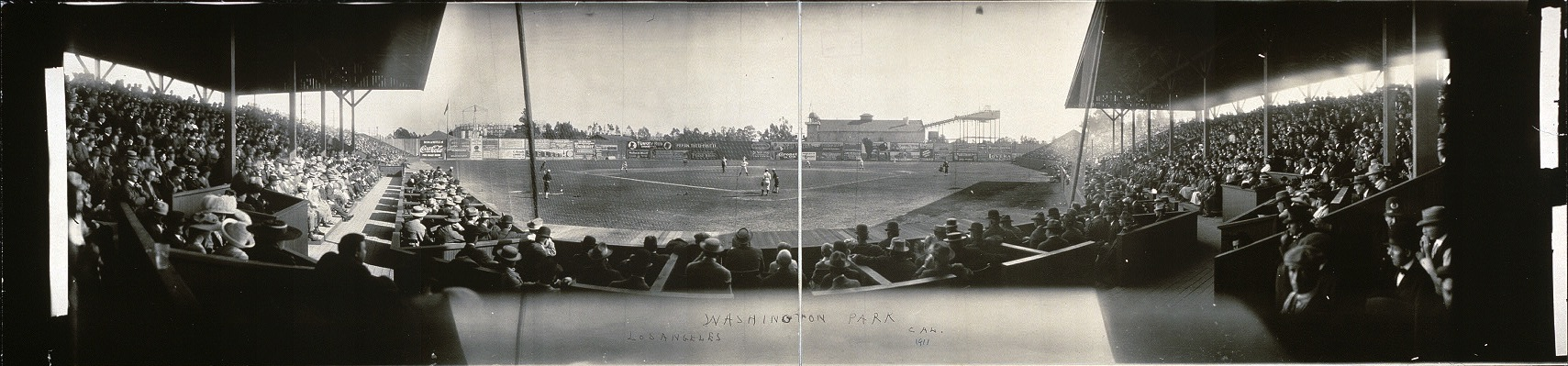
The first Washington Park, before 1911. Chutes Park water slide and building are visible beyond right field.

== Gallery ==
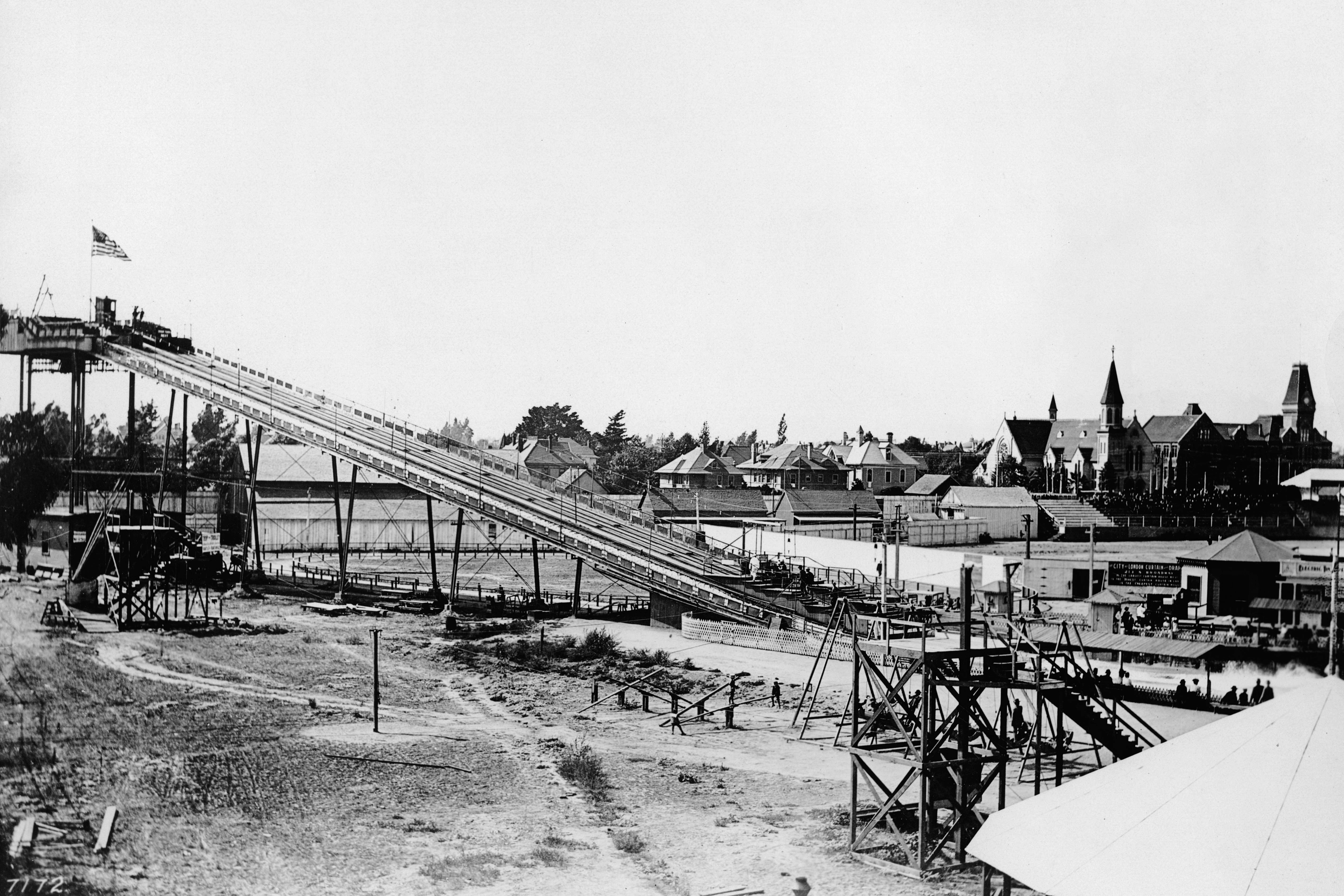
Chutes Park with a portion of the baseball park visible, upper right

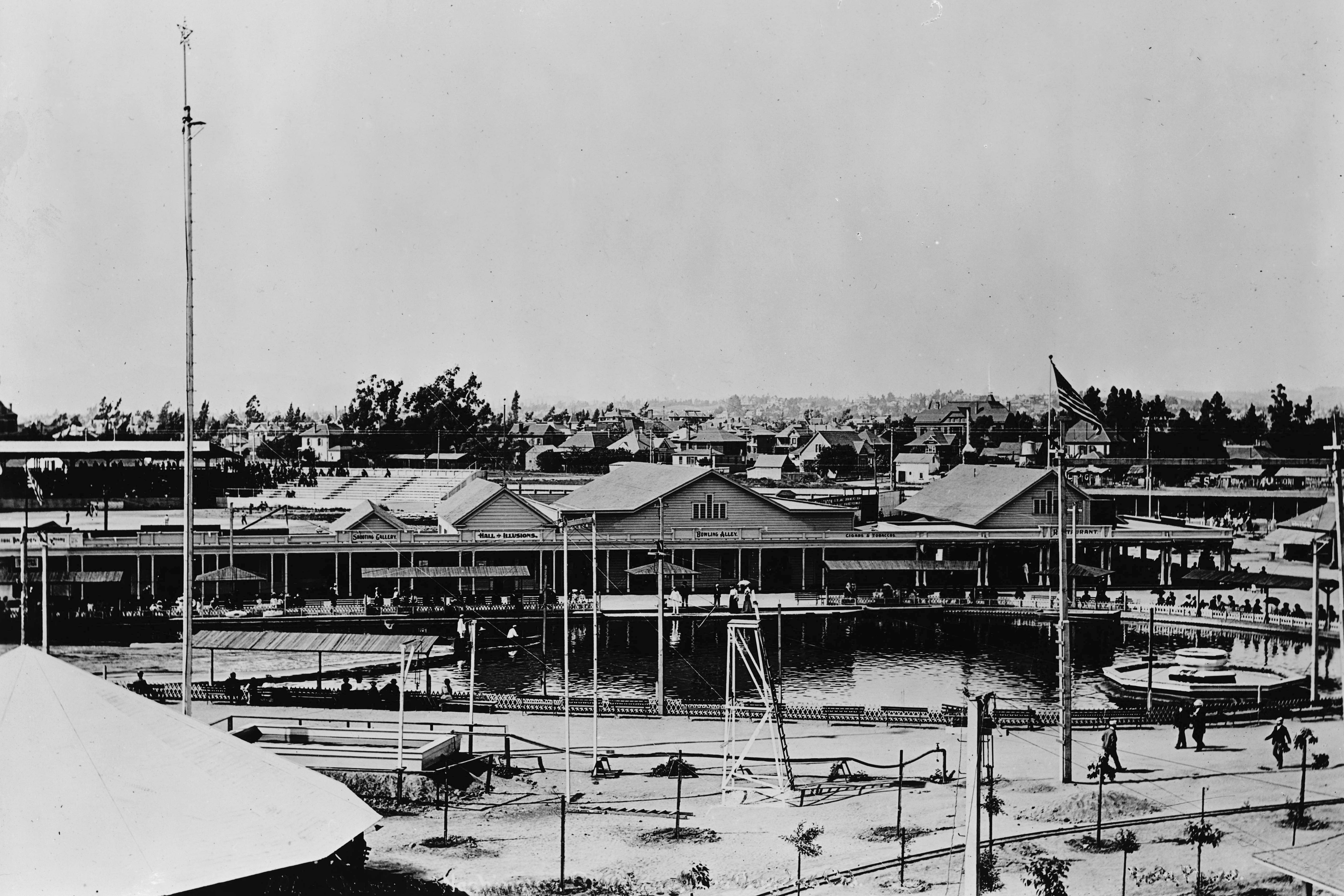
Chutes Park with a portion of the baseball park visible, upper left

Combined photo with ballpark outlined in green rectangle

Chutes Park baseball field on opening day 1909

== Sources ==
- Berman, Jay and Sesar Carreno. "The Short Life of a Downtown Amusement Park," Los Angeles Downtown News, April 9, 2006
- Stanton, Jeffrey. 2005. Chutes & Luna Park - 1900 - 1912. Retrieved July 27, 2007
- Take Me Out to the Ball Park, Lowell Reidenbaugh, The Sporting News, 1983 & 1987, p. 138-142
- Ballparks of North America, Michael Benson, McFarland, 1989, p. 209
