= Doug McWeeny =

American baseball player (1896–1953)

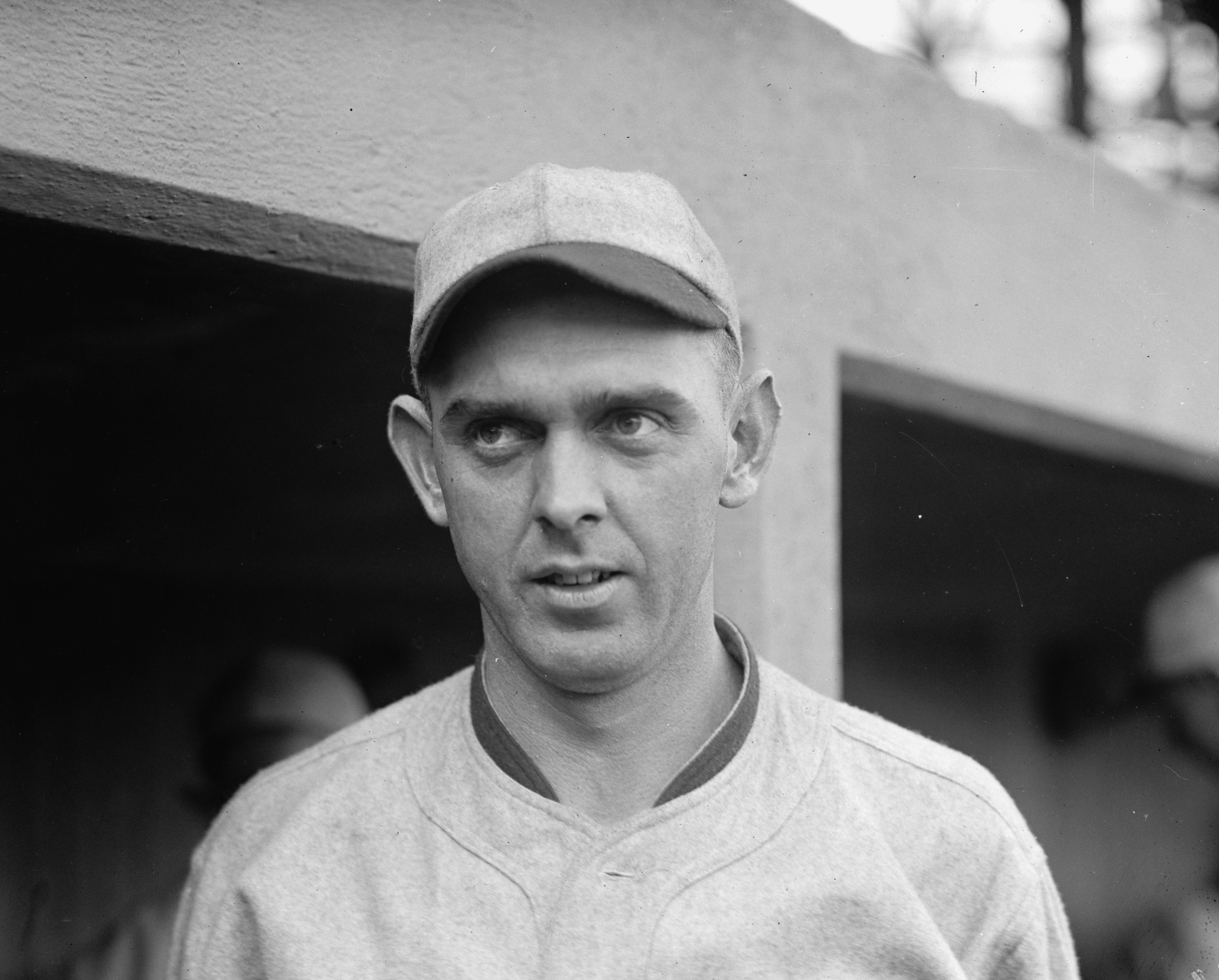
- Pitcher
- Born: August 17, 1896; Chicago, Illinois, U.S.
- Died: January 1, 1953 (aged 56); Melrose Park, Illinois, U.S.
- Batted: Right Threw: Right

MLB debut
- April 24, 1921, for the Chicago White Sox

Last MLB appearance
- June 17, 1930, for the Cincinnati Reds

MLB statistics
- Win–loss record: 37–57
- Earned run average: 4.17
- Strikeouts: 386
- Stats at Baseball Reference

Teams
- Chicago White Sox (1921–1924); Brooklyn Robins (1926–1929); Cincinnati Reds (1930)

Douglas Lawrence McWeeny (August 17, 1896 – January 1, 1953) was a pitcher in Major League Baseball. He pitched from 1921 to 1930. He pitched right-handed.

McWeeny made his big-league debut on April 24, 1921, and won three games for the Chicago White Sox that season. His best year came in 1928 with the Brooklyn Robins, with a 14-14 record that included a National League-best four shutouts. He also led the NL in walks that season (114), and had a league-worst 11 wild pitches in 1929, a year before his career came to an end.

Nicknamed Buzz, McWeeny worked as a service station attendant in the off-season.
