= Rube Ellis =

American baseball player (1885–1938)

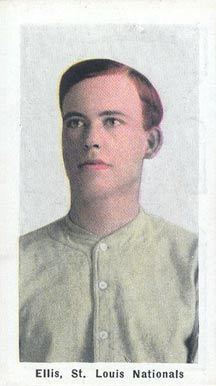
- Outfielder
- Born: November 17, 1885; Downey, California, U.S.
- Died: March 13, 1938 (aged 52); Rivera, California, U.S.
- Batted: Left Threw: Left

MLB debut
- April 15, 1909, for the St. Louis Cardinals

Last MLB appearance
- October 6, 1912, for the St. Louis Cardinals

MLB statistics
- Batting average: .260
- Home runs: 13
- Runs batted in: 199
- Stats at Baseball Reference

Teams
- St. Louis Cardinals (1909–1912)

George William "Rube" Ellis (November 17, 1885 – March 13, 1938), was an American professional baseball player. He played as an outfielder in the major leagues for the St. Louis Cardinals from 1909 through 1912. In both 1909 and 1910, Ellis led all National League left fielders in assists.

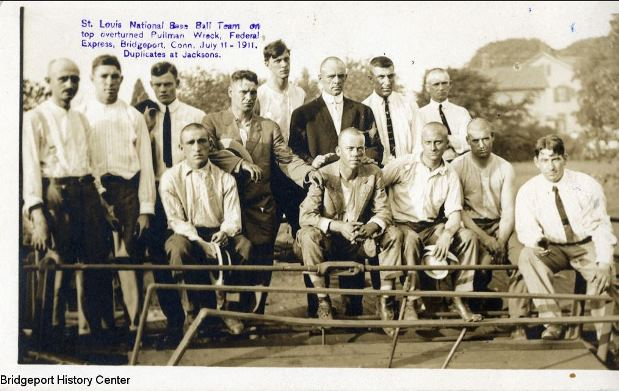
Members of the 1911 St. Louis Cardinals following a train wreck in Bridgeport, Connecticut—Ellis is seated at center, clasping his hands

Ellis was interred at Rose Hills Memorial Park.
