= 1911 Cleveland Naps season =

1911 Cleveland Naps
- League: American League
- Ballpark: League Park II
- City: Cleveland, Ohio
- Record: 80–73 (.523)
- League place: 3rd
- Owners: Charles Somers
- Managers: Deacon McGuire, George Stovall

The 1911 Cleveland Naps season was a season in American major league baseball. It involved the Cleveland Naps attempting to win the American League pennant and finishing in third place (22 games back). They had a record of 80 wins and 73 losses.

The Naps played their home games at League Park II.

== Regular season ==
=== Addie Joss ===
Addie Joss, the ace starting pitcher for the Naps, experienced fainting spells while training for the 1911 season. He died of tubercular meningitis on April 14, at his home in Toledo, Ohio, leaving behind his wife and two young children. Joss's funeral took place on April 17 in Toledo, when the Naps were scheduled to play the Detroit Tigers. The players declared their intention to strike if the game that day was not postponed. Though American League president Ban Johnson initially did not agree, he cancelled the game. Several Tigers players attended the funeral as well.

Charles Sommers, the owner of the Naps, began to plan the Addie Joss Benefit Game, which was held at League Park in Cleveland on July 24, a mutual off day for all teams in the American League. An all-star team played against Cleveland, defeating the Naps by a score of 5–3. In total, nine players from the game were later inducted into the National Baseball Hall of Fame: Cy Young and Nap Lajoie for Cleveland, Walter Johnson, Ty Cobb, Eddie Collins, Tris Speaker, Sam Crawford, Home Run Baker, and Bobby Wallace for the all-stars. The game raised $12,914 for Joss's widow ($446,225 in current dollar terms); the sum was more than double Joss's annual salary.

=== Season highlights ===
In his rookie season, Shoeless Joe Jackson hit .408, which ranked second in the American League. He also finished in the league top 10 in home runs, RBI, runs scored, and stolen bases. Jackson was fourth in the Chalmers MVP Award voting.

Vean Gregg led the starting pitchers of the team in several categories: he had a total of 23 wins and seven losses; he pitched 244 2/3 innings, yet maintained a league-leading 1.80 ERA, while striking out 125 batters.

Young, 44 years old at the time, played part of his final season with the 1911 Cleveland Naps team.

=== Season standings ===
American League
Team	W	L	Pct.	GB	Home	Road
Philadelphia Athletics	101	50	.669	—	54‍–‍20	47‍–‍30
Detroit Tigers	89	65	.578	13½	51‍–‍25	38‍–‍40
Cleveland Naps	80	73	.523	22	46‍–‍30	34‍–‍43
Boston Red Sox	78	75	.510	24	39‍–‍37	39‍–‍38
Chicago White Sox	77	74	.510	24	40‍–‍37	37‍–‍37
New York Highlanders	76	76	.500	25½	36‍–‍40	40‍–‍36
Washington Senators	64	90	.416	38½	39‍–‍38	25‍–‍52
St. Louis Browns	45	107	.296	56½	25‍–‍53	20‍–‍54

=== Record vs. opponents ===
1911 American League record Sources:
Team	BOS	CWS	CLE	DET	NYH	PHA	SLB	WSH
Boston	—	11–11	11–11	10–12	12–10	9–13	12–9	13–9
Chicago	11–11	—	6–15–2	8–14	13–9	9–11–1	17–5	13–9
Cleveland	11–11	15–6–2	—	6–16	14–8–1	5–17	15–7	14–8
Detroit	12–10	14–8	16–6	—	7–15	12–10	14–8	14–8
New York	10–12	9–13	8–14–1	15–7	—	6–15	16–5	12–10
Philadelphia	13–9	11–9–1	17–5	10–12	15–6	—	20–2	15–7
St. Louis	9–12	5–17	7–15	8–14	5–16	2–20	—	9–13
Washington	9–13	9–13	8–14	8–14	10–12	7–15	13–9	—

=== Roster ===
1911 Cleveland Naps
Roster
Pitchers: Jim Baskette; Fred Blanding; Ben Demott; Cy Falkenberg; Vean Gregg; Spec Harkness; Bill James; George Kahler; Gene Krapp; Willie Mitchell; Pat Paige; Bugs Reisigl; Josh Swindell; Hi West; Earl Yingling; Cy Young	Catchers: Bert Adams; Gus Fisher; Grover Land; Steve O'Neill; Syd Smith; Infielders: Neal Ball; Herman Bronkie; Art Griggs; Tim Hendryx; Cotton Knaupp; Nap Lajoie; Bill Lindsay; Jack Mills; Ivy Olson; George Stovall; Terry Turner	Outfielders: Joe Birmingham; Hank Butcher; Dave Callahan; Ted Easterly; Jack Graney; Joe Jackson	Managers: Deacon McGuire; George Stovall

== Player stats ==
=== Batting ===
==== Starters by position ====
Note: Pos = Position; G = Games played; AB = At bats; H = Hits; Avg. = Batting average; HR = Home runs; RBI = Runs batted in

Pos	Player	G	AB	H	Avg.	HR	RBI
C	Gus Fisher	70	203	53	.261	0	12
1B	George Stovall	126	458	124	.271	0	79
2B	Neal Ball	116	412	122	.296	3	45
3B	Terry Turner	117	417	105	.252	0	28
SS	Ivy Olson	140	545	142	.261	1	50
OF	Joe Jackson	147	571	233	.408	7	83
OF	Jack Graney	146	527	142	.269	1	45
OF	Joe Birmingham	125	447	136	.304	2	51

==== Other batters ====
Note: G = Games played; AB = At bats; H = Hits; Avg. = Batting average; HR = Home runs; RBI = Runs batted in

Player	G	AB	H	Avg.	HR	RBI
Nap Lajoie	90	315	115	.365	2	60
Ted Easterly	99	287	93	.324	1	37
Syd Smith	58	154	46	.299	1	21
Hank Butcher	38	133	32	.241	1	11
Grover Land	35	107	15	.140	0	10
Art Griggs	27	68	17	.250	1	7
Bill Lindsay	19	66	16	.242	0	5
Cotton Knaupp	13	39	4	.103	0	0
Steve O'Neill	9	27	4	.148	0	1
Jack Mills	13	17	5	.294	0	1
Dave Callahan	6	16	4	.250	0	0
Tim Hendryx	4	7	2	.286	0	0
Herman Bronkie	2	6	1	.167	0	0
Bert Adams	2	5	1	.200	0	0
Ben Demott	2	4	0	.000	0	0

=== Pitching ===
==== Starting pitchers ====
Note: G = Games pitched; IP = Innings pitched; W = Wins; L = Losses; ERA = Earned run average; SO = Strikeouts

Player	G	IP	W	L	ERA	SO
Vean Gregg	34	244.2	23	7	1.80	125
Gene Krapp	35	222.0	13	9	3.41	132
Willie Mitchell	30	177.1	7	14	3.76	78
Cy Falkenberg	15	106.2	8	5	3.29	46
Bill James	8	51.2	2	4	4.88	21
Cy Young	7	46.1	3	4	3.88	20
Earl Yingling	4	22.1	1	0	4.33	6
Ben Demott	1	3.2	0	1	12.27	2

==== Other pitchers ====
Note: G = Games pitched; IP = Innings pitched; W = Wins; L = Losses; ERA = Earned run average; SO = Strikeouts

Player	G	IP	W	L	ERA	SO
Fred Blanding	29	176.0	7	11	3.68	80
George Kahler	30	154.1	9	8	3.27	97
Hi West	13	64.2	3	4	3.76	17
Spec Harkness	12	53.1	2	2	4.22	25
Jim Baskette	4	21.1	1	2	3.38	8
Josh Swindell	4	17.1	0	1	2.08	6
Pat Paige	2	16.0	1	0	4.50	6
Bugs Reisigl	2	13.0	0	1	6.23	6

== Awards and honors ==
=== League top ten finishers ===
Vean Gregg

- MLB leader in ERA (1.80)
- #2 in AL in shutouts (5)
- #4 in AL in wins (23)
- #8 in AL in complete games (22)

Shoeless Joe Jackson

- MLB leader in on-base percentage (.468)
- #2 in AL in batting average (.408)
- #2 in AL in slugging percentage (.590)
- #2 in AL in runs scored (126)
- #2 in AL in hits (233)
- #2 in AL in doubles (45)
- #3 in AL in triples (19)
- #4 in AL in home runs (7)
- #6 in AL in stolen bases (41)
- #9 in AL in RBI (83)

Gene Krapp

- #10 in AL in strikeouts (132)
