= 1910 Cleveland Naps season =

1910 Cleveland Naps
- League: American League
- Ballpark: League Park
- City: Cleveland, Ohio
- Record: 71–81 (.467)
- League place: 5th
- Owners: Charles Somers
- Managers: Deacon McGuire

The 1910 Cleveland Naps season was a season in American baseball. It involved the Cleveland Naps finishing fifth in the American League.

== Regular season ==
- August 30, 1910: Tom Hughes threw what would have been the first no-hitter in New York Highlanders history against the Naps, but the game was tied at 0–0 after nine innings. Cleveland got their first hit in the 10th, then scored five runs in the 11th inning to beat New York by a score of 5–0.

=== Season standings ===
American League
Team	W	L	Pct.	GB	Home	Road
Philadelphia Athletics	102	48	.680	—	57‍–‍19	45‍–‍29
New York Highlanders	88	63	.583	14½	49‍–‍25	39‍–‍38
Detroit Tigers	86	68	.558	18	46‍–‍31	40‍–‍37
Boston Red Sox	81	72	.529	22½	51‍–‍28	30‍–‍44
Cleveland Naps	71	81	.467	32	39‍–‍36	32‍–‍45
Chicago White Sox	68	85	.444	35½	41‍–‍37	27‍–‍48
Washington Senators	66	85	.437	36½	38‍–‍35	28‍–‍50
St. Louis Browns	47	107	.305	57	26‍–‍51	21‍–‍56

=== Record vs. opponents ===
1910 American League record Sources:
Team	BOS	CWS	CLE	DET	NYH	PHA	SLB	WSH
Boston	—	10–12	14–8–3	12–10	9–13–1	4–18	16–6	16–5–1
Chicago	12–10	—	10–12	9–13	8–13–2	8–14–1	12–10	9–13
Cleveland	8–14–3	12–10	—	9–13	8–13	7–14–4	18–4–1	9–13–1
Detroit	10–12	13–9	13–9	—	13–9	9–13	15–7	13–9–1
New York	13–9–1	13–8–2	13–8	9–13	—	9–12	16–6–1	15–7–1
Philadelphia	18–4	14–8–1	14–7–4	13–9	12–9	—	17–5	14–6
St. Louis	6–16	10–12	4–18–1	7–15	6–16–1	5–17	—	9–13–2
Washington	5–16–1	13–9	13–9–1	9–13–1	7–15–1	6–14	13–9–2	—

=== Roster ===
1910 Cleveland Naps
Roster
Pitchers: Heinie Berger; Fred Blanding; Ben Demott; Walt Doan; Cy Falkenberg; Harry Fanwell; Spec Harkness; Addie Joss; George Kahler; Harry Kirsch; Elmer Koestner; Fred Link; Willie Mitchell; Cy Young	Catchers: Bert Adams; Harry Bemis; Nig Clarke; Pat Donahue; Ted Easterly; Grover Land; Deacon McGuire; Syd Smith; Infielders: Neal Ball; Bill Bradley; Herman Bronkie; Eddie Hohnhorst; Cotton Knaupp; Nap Lajoie; Simon Nicholls; Roger Peckinpaugh; George Perring; Morrie Rath; George Stovall; Terry Turner	Outfielders: Joe Birmingham; Dave Callahan; Elmer Flick; Jack Graney; Joe Jackson; Art Kruger; Bris Lord; Harry Niles; Jim Rutherford; Art Thomason	Manager: Deacon McGuire

== Player stats ==
=== Batting ===
==== Starters by position ====
Note: Pos = Position; G = Games played; AB = At bats; H = Hits; Avg. = Batting average; HR = Home runs; RBI = Runs batted in

Pos	Player	G	AB	H	Avg.	HR	RBI
C	Ted Easterly	110	363	111	.306	0	55
1B	George Stovall	142	521	136	.261	0	52
2B	Nap Lajoie	159	592	227	.383	4	76
SS	Terry Turner	150	574	132	.230	0	33
3B	Bill Bradley	61	214	42	.196	0	12
OF	Art Kruger	62	223	38	.170	0	14
OF	Joe Birmingham	104	367	84	.229	0	35
OF	Jack Graney	116	454	107	.236	1	31

==== Other batters ====
Note: G = Games played; AB = At bats; H = Hits; Avg. = Batting average; HR = Home runs; RBI = Runs batted in

Player	G	AB	H	Avg.	HR	RBI
Harry Niles	70	240	51	.213	1	18
Bris Lord	58	210	46	.219	0	17
Harry Bemis	61	167	36	.216	1	16
Neal Ball	54	123	25	.203	0	12
George Perring	39	122	27	.221	0	8
Grover Land	34	111	23	.207	0	7
Joe Jackson	20	75	29	.387	1	11
Art Thomason	20	70	12	.171	0	2
Elmer Flick	24	68	18	.265	1	7
Morrie Rath	24	67	13	.194	0	0
Eddie Hohnhorst	18	63	20	.317	0	6
Cotton Knaupp	18	59	14	.237	0	11
Nig Clarke	21	58	9	.155	0	2
Roger Peckinpaugh	15	45	9	.200	0	6
Dave Callahan	13	44	8	.182	0	2
Syd Smith	9	27	9	.333	0	3
Bert Adams	5	13	3	.231	0	0
Herman Bronkie	5	10	2	.200	0	0
Pat Donahue	2	6	1	.167	0	0
Deacon McGuire	1	3	1	.333	0	0
Jim Rutherford	1	2	1	.500	0	0
Simon Nicholls	3	0	0	----	0	0

=== Pitching ===
==== Starting pitchers ====
Note: G = Games pitched; IP = Innings pitched; W = Wins; L = Losses; ERA = Earned run average; SO = Strikeouts

Player	G	IP	W	L	ERA	SO
Cy Falkenberg	37	256.2	14	13	2.95	107
Cy Young	21	163.1	7	10	2.53	58
Addie Joss	13	107.1	5	5	2.26	49
George Kahler	12	95.1	6	4	1.60	38
Fred Blanding	6	45.1	2	2	2.78	25

==== Other pitchers ====
Note: G = Games pitched; IP = Innings pitched; W = Wins; L = Losses; ERA = Earned run average; SO = Strikeouts

Player	G	IP	W	L	ERA	SO
Willie Mitchell	35	183.2	12	8	2.60	102
Elmer Koestner	27	145.0	5	10	3.04	60
Spec Harkness	26	136.1	10	7	3.04	60
Fred Link	22	127.2	5	6	3.17	55
Harry Fanwell	17	92.0	2	9	3.62	30
Heinie Berger	13	65.1	3	4	3.03	24
Ben Demott	6	28.1	0	3	5.40	13

==== Relief pitchers ====
Note: G = Games pitched; W = Wins; L = Losses; SV = Saves; ERA = Earned run average; SO = Strikeouts

Player	G	W	L	SV	ERA	SO
Walt Doan	6	0	0	0	5.60	7
Harry Kirsch	2	0	0	0	6.00	5
