= Addie Joss Benefit Game =

Exhibition baseball game

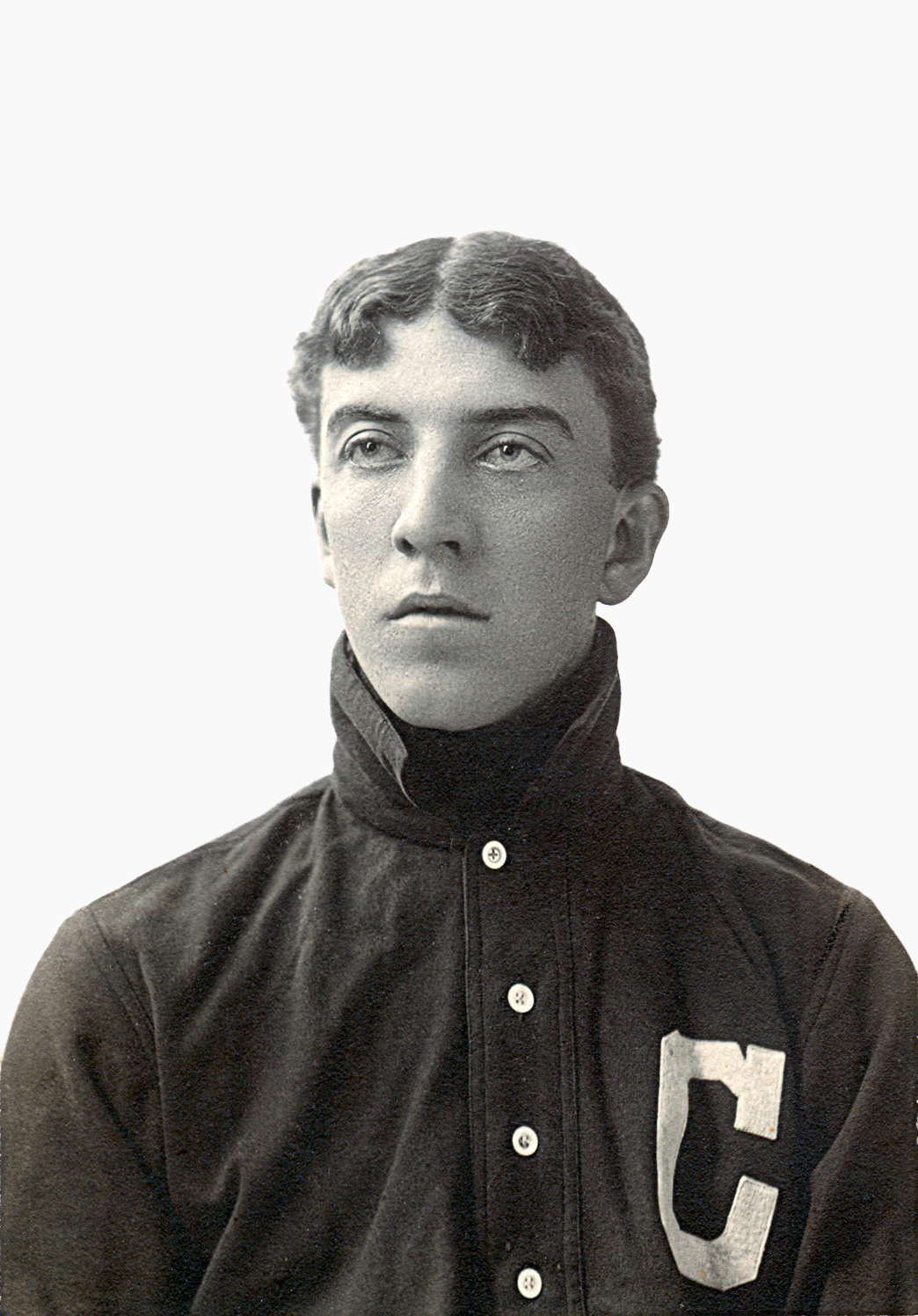
- Addie Joss in 1902
	1	2	3	4	5	6	7	8	9	R	H	E
All-Stars	2	1	0	1	0	0	1	0	0	5	15	0
Cleveland Naps	0	1	0	0	0	0	0	2	0	3	8	2
- Date: July 24, 1911; 114 years ago
- Venue: League Park
- City: Cleveland, Ohio, U.S.
- Managers: Jimmy McAleer (All-Stars); George Stovall (Cleveland Naps)
- Umpires: Rip Egan and Tom Connolly
- Attendance: 15,281
- Time of game: 1:32

The Addie Joss Benefit Game was an exhibition baseball game played at League Park in Cleveland, Ohio, on July 24, 1911, between the Cleveland Naps of the American League and an all-star team composed of players from the league's other teams. The game was planned as a benefit for the family of Addie Joss, a pitcher for the Naps who died in April. The all-stars defeated the Naps, 5–3, and the game raised $12,914 for the Joss family ($446,225 in 2025).

Following Joss's death, Cleveland's management announced their plans to put on a benefit for his widow and two young children. Star players from other teams volunteered to form an all-star team to play against the Naps. Paid attendance was 15,272, and many players and team owners contributed money to the Joss family as well. The benefit game preceded the creation of the Major League Baseball All-Star Game, first contested in 1933, which raises money for the players' pension fund.

== Background ==
Addie Joss, the ace starting pitcher for the Cleveland Naps of the American League, experienced fainting spells while training for the 1911 season. He died of tubercular meningitis on April 14, at his home in Toledo, Ohio, leaving behind his wife, Lillian, and two young children, Ruth and Norman.

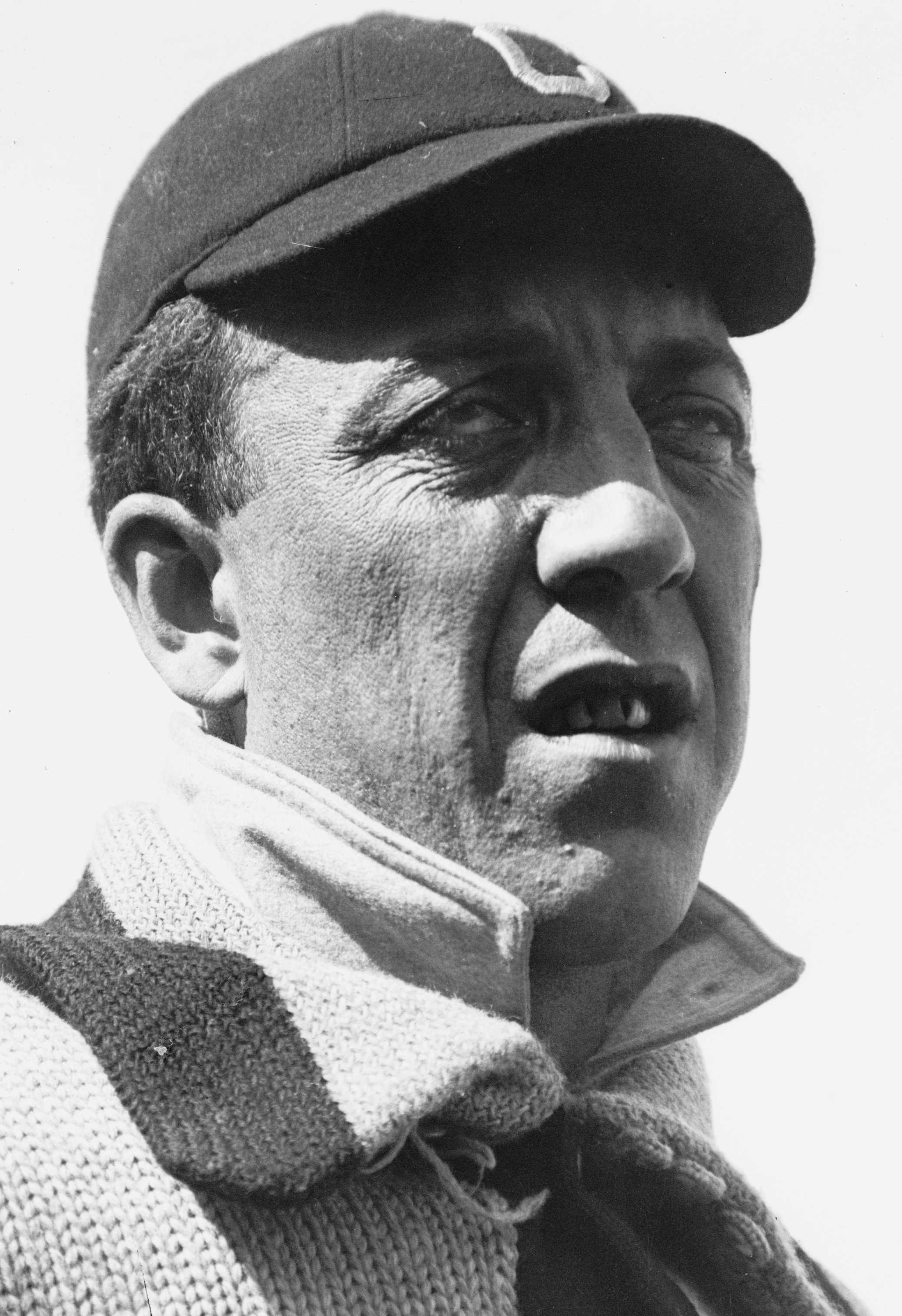
Addie Joss in 1910

Joss's funeral took place on April 17 in Toledo, when the Naps were scheduled to play the Detroit Tigers. Ernest Barnard, the team's vice president, hoped to send a delegation of about five players to represent the Naps at the funeral, but in a team meeting held by team captain George Stovall, the players voted that they all wanted to attend the funeral, and declared their intention to strike if the game that day was not postponed. Though American League president Ban Johnson initially did not agree, he cancelled the game. Several Tigers players attended the funeral as well.

== Organization ==
Charles Sommers, the owner of the Naps, began to plan an "Addie Joss Day" to benefit his family. Naps management announced a benefit game would be held for Joss's family at League Park in Cleveland on July 24, which was a mutual off day for all teams in the American League. It was hoped that each team would contribute some players to play against the Naps. All proceeds were to go to Joss's widow. As no other day on the calendar would suffice, the game would not be rescheduled if rain necessitated its cancellation.

Barnard and the sports editors of the Cleveland News and Cleveland Plain Dealer formed a committee charged with organizing the event, including selecting players for the all-star team. Jimmy McAleer, the manager of the Washington Senators, volunteered to manage the all-star team. Star players, including Walter Johnson and Ty Cobb, quickly volunteered to participate. Barnard requested that McAleer bring Germany Schaefer, the baseball comedian, to serve as a utility infielder and provide entertainment to the fans. Each team sent at least one player, with the exception of the Chicago White Sox. Though Ed Walsh of the White Sox had agreed to participate, Chicago's travel schedule ultimately prohibited any member of the team from participating.

== The game ==
The all-star team had Johnson, Smoky Joe Wood, and Russ Ford as the pitchers, an outfield of Cobb, Sam Crawford, Tris Speaker, and Clyde Milan, and infielders Schaefer, Eddie Collins, Home Run Baker, Hal Chase, and Bobby Wallace. Gabby Street and Paddy Livingston were the catchers. In total, nine players from the game were later inducted into the National Baseball Hall of Fame: Cy Young and Nap Lajoie for Cleveland, Johnson, Cobb, Collins, Speaker, Crawford, Baker, and Wallace for the all-stars. Shoeless Joe Jackson, another Hall of Fame-caliber player, played for Cleveland.

Barnard and the committee also sought donations. Cobb made what was initially an anonymous donation of $100 ($3,455 in current dollar terms), but Barnard convinced him to publicize the donation to help secure more. Sommers also donated $100, as did the owners of the White Sox, Tigers, and Boston Red Sox. The Athletics donated $200 ($6,911 in current dollar terms), and Athletics' manager Connie Mack donated another $25 ($864 in current dollar terms). The owner of St. Louis sent a check for $50. The Dayton minor league baseball team contributed $10 ($346 in current dollar terms). Young spent $25 on box seats, even though he was playing in the game. All players and park employees participated in the event for no compensation.

The gates to League Park opened at 1 pm on July 24, and paid attendance was 15,272. (Note: George Sisler, then 18 years old, attended the game.) According to reporters, the day had a festive atmosphere. J.P. Garvey of the Plain Dealer wrote that "there was no mourning, save that the flag hung at half mast from the pole in center field. No drab coloring decorated the big grand stand." Schaefer entertained the crowd during pre-game warmups and served as a public address announcer during the game. Cobb did not have a Tigers uniform, so he wore a Cleveland road uniform for the game.

=== Game summary ===
==== Game play ====
Cy Young was the starting pitcher for Cleveland and Smoky Joe Wood started for the all-stars. Tris Speaker led off the game for the all-stars with a single and scored on a triple by Eddie Collins. The all-stars scored a second run when Ty Cobb hit a single to drive Collins home. The all-stars scored again in the second inning on a sacrifice fly by Smoky Joe Wood that scored Hal Chase. Cleveland scored their first run in the bottom of the second inning when George Stovall singled and Joe Birmingham hit a double, scoring Stovall.

Speaker and Wood exited the game during the third inning to catch a train to Boston. Clyde Milan entered the game as the center fielder, and Johnson took over as the all-star's pitcher. Art Griggs batted for Young as a pinch hitter in the third inning, and George Kahler entered the game as Cleveland's pitcher in the fourth inning. Kahler allowed singles to Baker and Crawford, and Chase hit a sacrifice fly that scored Baker in the fourth inning. Nap Lajoie and Ted Easterly entered the game for Cleveland in the top of the fifth inning, replacing Stovall at first base and Syd Smith at catcher, respectively. Lajoie, the namesake of the Naps and their former manager, took over for Stovall as the Naps manager for the remainder of the game.

In the sixth inning, Hank Butcher replaced Jackson in right field for Cleveland, and Russ Ford and Paddy Livingston replaced Johnson and Gabby Street as the all-star's battery. Fred Blanding relieved Kahler for the Naps in the seventh inning; Milan hit a double and scored on a single by Collins that inning. Blanding began the eighth inning with a single, and scored after a triple by Ivy Olson, who scored on a sacrifice by Butcher. The game concluded with the all-stars defeating the Naps, 5–3.

==== Linescore and box score ====
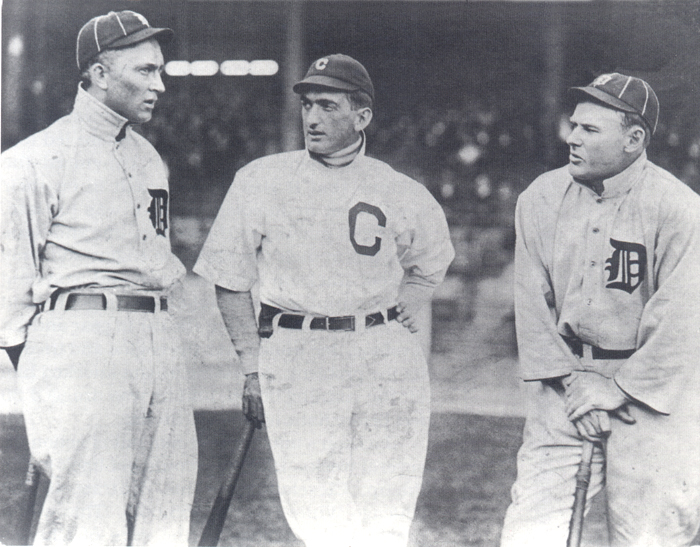
Ty Cobb (left), Shoeless Joe Jackson (center), and Sam Crawford in 1912

July 24, 1911 at League Park in Cleveland, Ohio
Team	1	2	3	4	5	6	7	8	9	R	H	E
All-Stars	2	1	0	1	0	0	1	0	0	5	15	0
Cleveland	0	1	0	0	0	0	0	2	0	3	8	2
WP: Smoky Joe Wood LP: Cy Young; Attendance: 15,272; Umpires: Rip Egan; Tom Connolly; Boxscore

Key
†	Member of the Baseball Hall of Fame

All-Stars	AB	R	H
Tris Speaker,^{†} CF	2	1	2
Clyde Milan, CF	3	1	2
Eddie Collins,^{†} 2B	5	1	2
Ty Cobb,^{†} RF	4	0	2
Frank Baker,^{†} 3B	4	1	1
Sam Crawford,^{†} LF	4	0	1
Hal Chase, 1B	3	1	3
Bobby Wallace,^{†} SS	3	0	0
Gabby Street, C	2	0	1
Paddy Livingston, C	2	0	1
Smoky Joe Wood, P	0	0	0
Walter Johnson,^{†} P	1	0	0
Russ Ford, P	2	0	0
Team totals	35	5	15

All-Stars	IP	H	R	BB	SO
Smoky Joe Wood	2	2	1	0	0
Walter Johnson^{†} (W)	3	1	0	0	1
Russ Ford	4	5	2	1	1
Team totals	9	8	3	1	2

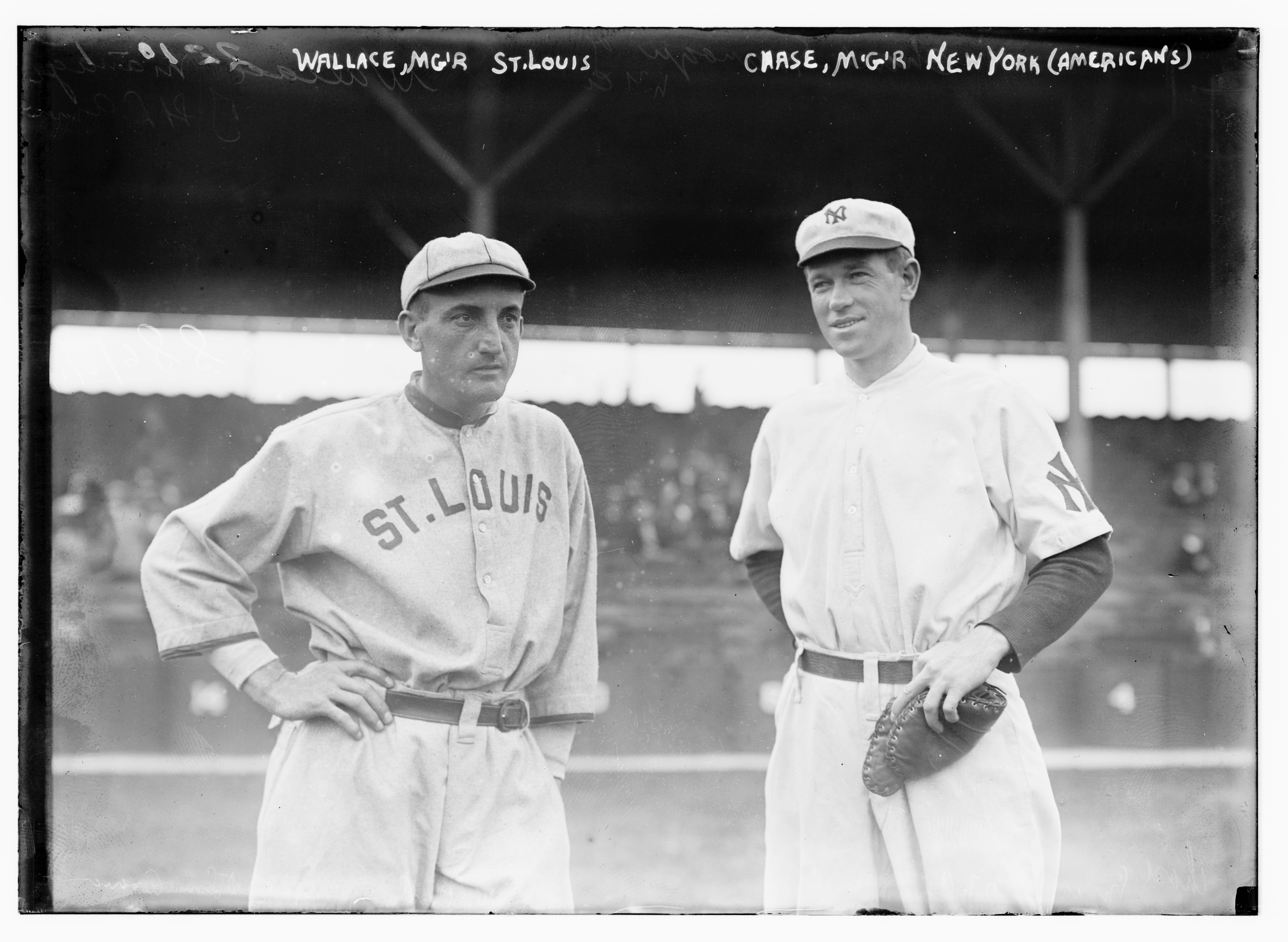
Bobby Wallace (left) and Hal Chase (right) in 1911

Cleveland	AB	R	H
Jack Graney, LF	4	0	1
Ivy Olson, SS	4	1	2
Joe Jackson, RF	2	0	0
Hank Butcher, RF	2	0	1
George Stovall, 1B	2	1	1
Nap Lajoie,^{†} 1B	2	0	0
Joe Birmingham, CF	4	0	1
Neal Ball, 2B	4	0	0
Terry Turner, 3B	3	0	1
Syd Smith, C	1	0	0
Ted Easterly, C	3	0	0
Cy Young,^{†} P	0	0	0
Art Griggs, PH	1	0	0
George Kahler, P	1	0	0
Fred Blanding, P	1	1	1
Team totals	34	3	8

Cleveland	IP	H	R	BB	SO
Cy Young^{†} (L)	3	6	3	0	0
George Kahler	3	4	1	2	0
Fred Blanding	3	5	1	0	2
Team totals	9	15	5	2	2

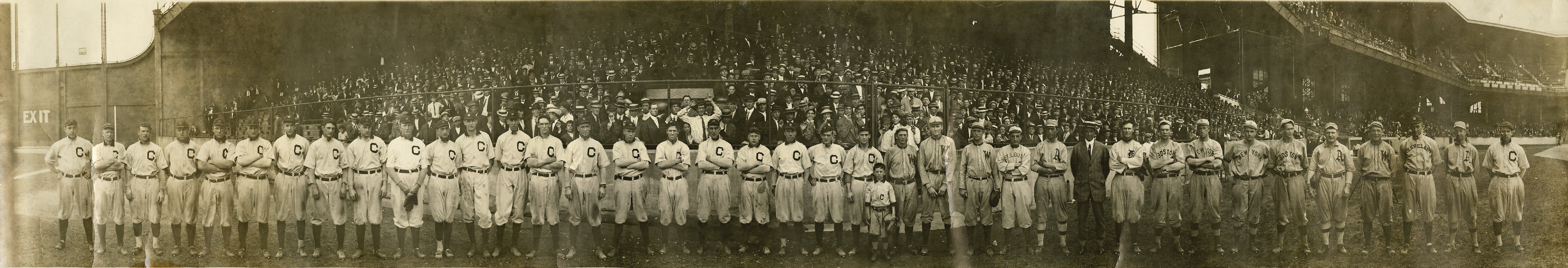
The participants of the Addie Joss Benefit Game

== Legacy ==
The game raised $12,914.60 for Joss's widow ($446,246 in current dollar terms); the sum was more than double Joss's annual salary. Joss's death inspired his Cleveland teammates to discuss forming a benefit association for players.

In the July 1915 issue of Baseball Magazine, editor F.C. Lane began to call for the creation of a seven-game all-star series to be held every July. Arch Ward of the Chicago Tribune in 1932 proposed pairing an all-star game with the 1933 World's Fair, and the 1933 Major League Baseball All-Star Game became the first of an annual event. Money earned through the All-Star Game is contributed to player pensions.

== See also ==
- Ace Bailey Benefit Game
- Tim Murnane Benefit Game
