= 1909 Cleveland Naps season =

1909 Cleveland Naps
- League: American League
- Ballpark: League Park
- City: Cleveland, Ohio
- Record: 71–82 (.464)
- League place: 6th
- Owners: Charles Somers
- Managers: Nap Lajoie, Deacon McGuire

The 1909 Cleveland Naps season was a season in American baseball. The team finished sixth in the American League with a record of 71–82, 27½ games behind the Detroit Tigers.

== Regular season ==
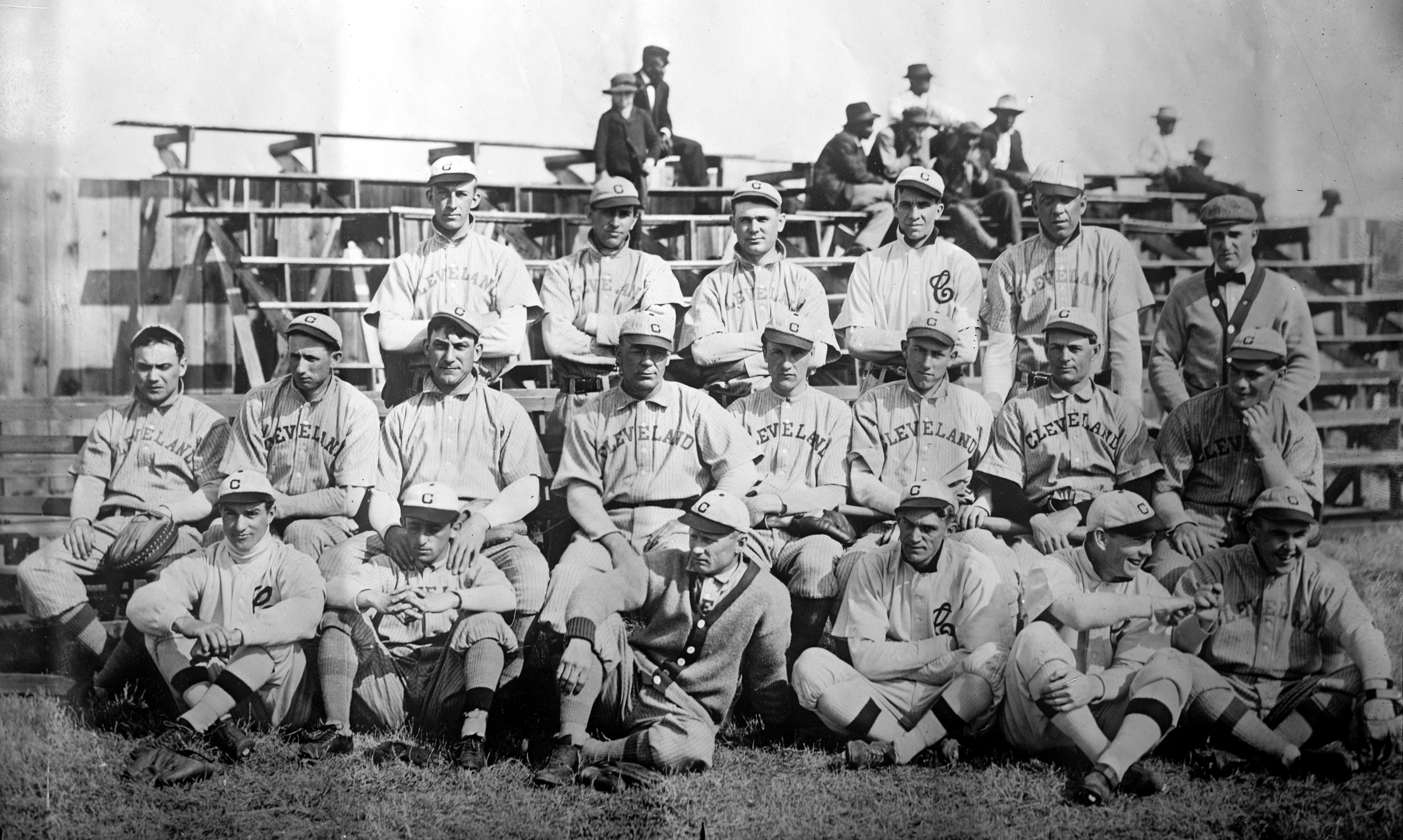

- July 19, 1909: Neal Ball of the Naps executed an unassisted triple play. He caught a line drive, touched second base and tagged the runner coming from first base.

=== Season standings ===
American League
Team	W	L	Pct.	GB	Home	Road
Detroit Tigers	98	54	.645	—	57‍–‍19	41‍–‍35
Philadelphia Athletics	95	58	.621	3½	49‍–‍27	46‍–‍31
Boston Red Sox	88	63	.583	9½	47‍–‍28	41‍–‍35
Chicago White Sox	78	74	.513	20	42‍–‍34	36‍–‍40
New York Highlanders	74	77	.490	23½	41‍–‍35	33‍–‍42
Cleveland Naps	71	82	.464	27½	39‍–‍37	32‍–‍45
St. Louis Browns	61	89	.407	36	40‍–‍37	21‍–‍52
Washington Senators	42	110	.276	56	27‍–‍48	15‍–‍62

=== Record vs. opponents ===
1909 American League record Sources:
Team	BOS	CWS	CLE	DET	NYH	PHA	SLB	WSH
Boston	—	13–9–1	14–8	9–13	13–9	10–11	13–7	16–6
Chicago	9–13–1	—	8–13–1	6–15–2	14–8–1	12–10	10–12–1	19–3–1
Cleveland	8–14	13–8–1	—	8–14–1	8–14	9–13	14–8	11–11
Detroit	13–9	15–6–2	14–8–1	—	14–8	8–14	18–3–1	16–6–2
New York	9–13	8–14–1	14–8	8–14	—	8–14	13–8–1	14–6
Philadelphia	11–10	10–12	13–9	14–8	14–8	—	14–8	19–3
St. Louis	7–13	12–10–1	8–14	3–18–1	8–13–1	8–14	—	15–7–1
Washington	6–16	3–19–1	11–11	6–16–2	6–14	3–19	7–15–1	—

=== Roster ===
1909 Cleveland Naps
Roster
Pitchers: Harry Ables; Heinie Berger; Red Booles; Cy Falkenberg; Addie Joss; Glenn Liebhardt; Willie Mitchell; Harry Otis; Bob Rhoads; Carl Sitton; Jerry Upp; Fred Winchell; Lucky Wright; Cy Young	Catchers: Harry Bemis; Nig Clarke; Ted Easterly; Bob Higgins; Grover Land; Infielders: Neal Ball; Bill Bradley; Nap Lajoie; Milo Netzel; George Perring; Dolly Stark; George Stovall; Terry Turner	Outfielders: Joe Birmingham; Josh Clarke; Walt Doan; Elmer Flick; Wilbur Good; Bill Hinchman; Bris Lord; Tom Raftery; Duke Reilley; Denny Sullivan	Manager: Nap Lajoie; Deacon McGuire

== Player stats ==
=== Batting ===
==== Starters by position ====
Note: Pos = Position; G = Games played; AB = At bats; H = Hits; Avg. = Batting average; HR = Home runs; RBI = Runs batted in

Pos	Player	G	AB	H	Avg.	HR	RBI
C	Ted Easterly	98	287	75	.261	1	27
1B	George Stovall	145	565	139	.246	2	49
2B	Nap Lajoie	128	469	152	.324	1	47
SS	Neal Ball	96	324	83	.256	1	25
3B	Bill Bradley	95	334	62	.186	0	22
OF	Bill Hinchman	139	457	118	.258	2	53
OF	Wilbur Good	94	318	68	.214	0	17
OF	Joe Birmingham	100	343	99	.289	1	38

==== Other batters ====
Note: G = Games played; AB = At bats; H = Hits; Avg. = Batting average; HR = Home runs; RBI = Runs batted in

Player	G	AB	H	Avg.	HR	RBI
George Perring	88	283	63	.223	0	20
Bris Lord	69	249	67	.269	1	25
Elmer Flick	66	235	60	.255	0	15
Terry Turner	53	208	52	.250	0	16
Nig Clarke	55	164	45	.274	0	14
Harry Bemis	42	123	23	.187	0	13
Duke Reilley	20	62	13	.210	0	0
Dolly Stark	19	60	12	.200	0	1
Milo Netzel	10	37	7	.189	0	3
Tom Raftery	8	32	7	.219	0	0
Bob Higgins	8	23	2	.087	0	0
Josh Clarke	4	12	0	.000	0	0
Walt Doan	4	9	1	.111	0	0
Grover Land	4	4	2	.500	0	1
Denny Sullivan	3	2	1	.500	0	0

=== Pitching ===
==== Starting pitchers ====
Note: G = Games pitched; IP = Innings pitched; W = Wins; L = Losses; ERA = Earned run average; SO = Strikeouts

Player	G	IP	W	L	ERA	SO
Cy Young	35	294.1	19	15	2.26	109
Heinie Berger	34	247.0	13	14	2.73	162
Addie Joss	33	242.2	14	13	1.71	67
Cy Falkenberg	24	165.0	10	9	2.40	82
Bob Rhoads	20	133.1	5	9	2.90	46
Willie Mitchell	3	23.0	1	2	1.57	8
Walt Doan	1	5.0	0	1	5.40	2

==== Other pitchers ====
Note: G = Games pitched; IP = Innings pitched; W = Wins; L = Losses; ERA = Earned run average; SO = Strikeouts

Player	G	IP	W	L	ERA	SO
Glenn Liebhardt	12	52.1	1	5	2.92	15
Carl Sitton	14	50.0	3	2	2.88	16
Harry Ables	5	29.2	1	1	2.12	24
Lucky Wright	5	28.0	0	4	3.21	5
Jerry Upp	7	26.2	2	1	1.69	13
Harry Otis	5	26.1	2	2	1.37	6
Red Booles	4	22.2	0	1	1.99	6
Fred Winchell	4	14.1	0	3	6.28	7
