= 1910 New Orleans Pelicans season =

1910 New Orleans Pelicans (baseball)
- Southern Association champions
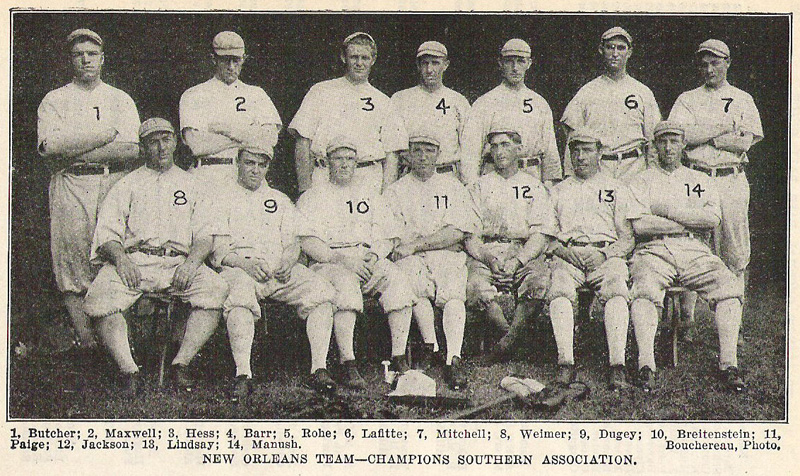
- League: Southern Association
- Ballpark: Pelican Park
- City: New Orleans, Louisiana
- Record: 87–53 (.621)
- League place: 1st
- Manager: Charlie Frank

The 1910 New Orleans Pelicans season was a season in professional baseball. The Pelicans played in the Southern Association and won their second league pennant. One sportswriter ranked them as the greatest sports team in the history of New Orleans. The team was owned and managed by Charlie Frank.

Shoeless Joe Jackson was a member of the team. Jackson had previously played for the Philadelphia Athletics of the American League, and owner Connie Mack sent him on loan to the Pelicans for the 1910 season. Jackson had a .354 batting average for New Orleans to win his third minor league batting title. He also led the league with 82 runs scored, 165 hits, and 19 triples, and he was praised for "his sweet swing and effortless skills in the outfield." This was Jackson's only season with the Pelicans. Later that year, he returned to the American League with the Cleveland Naps and batted .387 in 20 games.

Hank Butcher, George Rohe, and John W. Weimer tied for the league lead in home runs with 4 each. The team's pitchers were Ted Breitenstein, Otto Hess, Bert Maxwell, and Pat Paige. Hess had a 25–9 record, leading one writer to call the Pelicans a "two-man team" between Hess and Jackson. Paige went 24–14, and Breitenstein went 19–9.

The team coasted to an 8-game lead in the standings. After clinching the pennant, New Orleans defeated the Atlanta Crackers, and "a brass band played between innings, and twice during the game snacks of pretzels and sauerkraut were delivered onto the field, where play was halted so the athletes could snack."

== Standings ==
Team	W	L	Pct.	GB
New Orleans Pelicans	87	53	.621	—
Birmingham Barons	79	61	.564	8
Atlanta Crackers	75	63	.543	11
Chattanooga Lookouts	66	71	.482	19 1/2
Nashville Vols	64	76	.457	23
Mobile Sea Gulls	63	75	.457	23
Memphis Turtles	62	76	.449	24
Montgomery Rebels	59	80	.424	27 1/2

== Player statistics ==
=== Batting ===
Note: G = Games played; AB = At bats; H = Hits; Avg. = Batting average

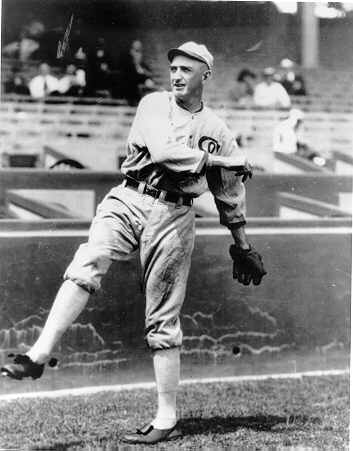
Shoeless Joe Jackson

George Rohe

Player	G	AB	H	Avg.
Ted Breitenstein	37	99	14	.141
Charles Brooks	48	154	30	.195
Hank Butcher	123	444	112	.252
Gene DeMontreville	107	339	64	.189
Oscar Dugey	19	65	9	.138
Otto Hess	41	109	20	.183
Shoeless Joe Jackson	136	466	165	.354
Jim Lafitte	126	398	85	.214
Bill Lindsay	110	358	90	.251
Frank Manush	143	476	122	.256
Bert Maxwell	32	81	11	.136
John Mitchell	23	58	6	.103
Pat Paige	44	122	17	.139
Eddie Reagan	10	32	7	.219
George Rohe	128	458	103	.225
John W. Weimer	135	456	107	.235

=== Pitching ===
Note: G = Games pitched; W = Wins; L = Losses; Pct. = Winning percentage

Player	G	W	L	Pct.
Ted Breitenstein	31	19	9	.679
Otto Hess	40	25	9	.735
Bert Maxwell	32	14	18	.438
Pat Paige	44	24	14	.632
