= 1913 Portland Beavers season =

1913 Portland Beavers
- League: Pacific Coast League
- Ballpark: Vaughn Street Park
- City: Portland, Oregon
- Record: 109–86
- League place: 1st
- Owners: William Wallace McCredie
- Managers: Walt McCredie

The 1913 Portland Beavers season was the 11th season in the history of the Portland Beavers baseball team. Under the leadership of manager Walt McCredie, the team compiled a 109–86 record and won the Pacific Coast League (PCL) pennant. The Beavers won five PCL pennants between 1906 and 1914.

Second baseman Bill Rodgers was the team captain and led the PCL with 239 hits. Pitchers Hi West and Bill James ranked first and second in the league with earned run averages of 1.71 and 1.98.

== 1913 PCL standings ==
Team	W	L	Pct.	GB
Portland Beavers	109	86	.559	--
Sacramento Sacts	103	94	.523	7.0
Venice Tigers	107	102	.512	9.0
San Francisco Seals	104	103	.502	11.0
Los Angeles Angels	100	108	.481	15.5
Oakland Oaks	90	120	.429	26.5

== Statistics ==
=== Batting ===
Note: Pos = Position; G = Games played; AB = At bats; H = Hits; Avg. = Batting average; HR = Home runs; SLG = Slugging percentage; SB = Stolen bases

Pos	Player	G	AB	H	Avg.	HR	SLG	SB
1B, 3B	Billy Speas	91	310	99	.319	0	.374	6
2B	Bill Rodgers	199	784	239	.305	5	.397	42
LF	Ty Lober	157	518	158	.305	1		20
RF	Walt Doan	169	582	177	.304	4	.409	37
3B	Bill Lindsay	139	487	146	.300	1	.359	6
P	Irv Higginbotham	54	127	38	.299	0	.370	4
C, 1B	Gus Fisher	139	390	114	.292	2	.372	23
CF, LF	Chet Chadbourne	191	789	223	.283	2	.346	39
SS, 3B	Art Kores	165	586	165	.282	5	.374	22
1B	Fred Derrick	150	551	151	.274	0	.330	34
SS, 3B	Mike McCormick	95	302	64	.212	1	.258	7
C	Claude Berry	101	277	68	.245	2	.365	9
2B	Harry Heilmann	122	417	127		11		

=== Pitching ===
Note: G = Games pitched; IP = Innings pitched; W = Wins; L = Losses; PCT = Win percentage; ERA = Earned run average; SO = Strikeouts

Player	G	IP	W	L	PCT	ERA	SO
Bill James	44	328.0	24	16	.600	1.98	215
Irv Higginbotham	46	301.2	21	14	.607	2.77	175
Harry Krause	46	284.0	17	11	.600	2.28	140
Hi West	34	278.2	18	11	.621	1.71	120
Rip Hagerman	44	232.2	14	9	.609	2.40	164
Gene Krapp	33	229.1	12	13	.480	2.20	139
