= Gus Fisher =

Gus Fisher may refer to:

- Gus Fisher (baseball), American baseball player
- Gus Fisher (fashion), New Zealand fashion designer
