= John Weimer =

John Weimer may refer to:

- John L. Weimer (born 1954), American judge
- John W. Weimer (1883–1940), American football, basketball, and baseball player and coach
