= 1903 Memphis Egyptians season =

1903 Memphis Egyptians
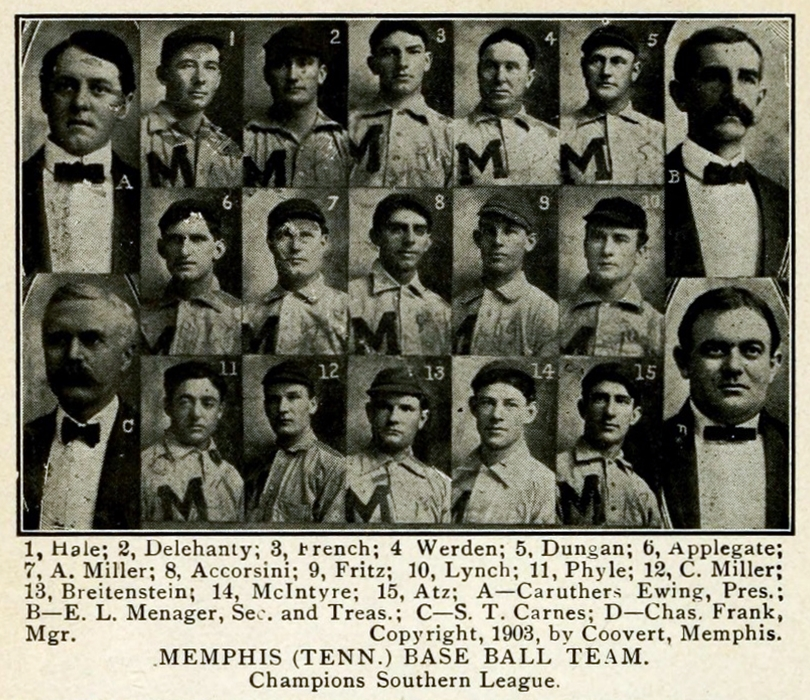
- League: Southern Association
- Ballpark: Russwood Park
- City: Memphis, Tennessee
- Record: 73–52
- League place: 1st
- Managers: Charlie Frank

The 1903 Memphis Egyptians season represented the Memphis Egyptians baseball team in the Southern Association and won their first league pennant. The team played its games at Russwood Park. The team was managed by Charlie Frank. The Egyptians were led by pitcher Harry McIntire. Perry Werden led the league in home runs with 8. The team also included pitcher Ted Breitenstein. Both Frank and Breitenstein left for New Orleans next season.

Frank was accused of inducing Atlanta to throw the final series with Memphis. After the season Little Rock defeated Memphis 3 games to 2 in a best of 5 series.
