= 1905 New Orleans Pelicans season =

1905 New Orleans Pelicans
- League: Southern Association
- Ballpark: Athletic Park
- City: New Orleans, Louisiana
- Record: 84–45
- League place: 1st
- Managers: Charlie Frank

The 1905 New Orleans Pelicans season represented the New Orleans Pelicans baseball team in the Southern Association and won their first league pennant, finishing with a record of 84 – 45. An outbreak of yellow fever resulted in a quarantine of New Orleans. The Pelicans were forced to play most of their games out of town. The team was led by pitcher Jimmy Dygert and Otto Williams. The team also included Ted Breitenstein, George Rohe and Erve Beck. Breitenstein went 21–5, and Dygert put up a record of 18–4.
