= 1921 Los Angeles Angels season =

1918 Los Angeles Angels
- League: Pacific Coast League
- Ballpark: Washington Park
- City: Los Angeles
- Record: 108–80
- League place: 1st
- Managers: Red Killefer

The 1921 Los Angeles Angels season was the 19th season for the Los Angeles Angels playing in the Pacific Coast League (PCL). The team won the PCL pennant with a 108–80 record. Red Killefer was the manager. He also appeared in 103 games, principally as a center fielder.

Right fielder Sam Crawford, at age 41, appeared in 175 games and led the team with a .318 batting average and a .463 slugging percentage. He was later inducted into the Baseball Hall of Fame.

Center fielder Jigger Statz, at age 23, compiled a .310 batting average. He went on to play 18 seasons for the Angels until retiring after the 1942 season. He was later inducted into the Pacific Coast League Hall of Fame.

At age 37, First baseman Art Griggs, hit .294 and led the team with 69 extra-base hits and 302 total bases.

The team's pitching staff was led by Doc Crandall with 24 wins, Vic Aldridge with a 2.16 earned run average (ERA), and Art Reinhart with a .750 winning percentage (15-5 win–loss record).

== 1921 PCL standings ==
Team	W	L	Pct.	GB
Los Angeles Angels	108	80	.574	--
Sacramento Senators	105	80	.568	1.5
San Francisco Seals	106	82	.564	2.0
Seattle Rainiers	103	82	.557	3.5
Oakland Oaks	101	85	.543	6.0
Vernon Tigers	96	90	.516	11.0
Salt Lake City Bees	73	110	.399	32.5
Portland Beavers	51	134	.276	52.0

== Statistics ==
=== Batting ===
Note: Pos = Position; G = Games played; AB = At bats; H = Hits; Avg. = Batting average; HR = Home runs; SLG = Slugging percentage

Pos	Player	G	AB	H	Avg.	HR	SLG
RF	Sam Crawford	175	626	199	.318	9	.463
2B	Bill McCabe	85	254	80	.315	1	.386
CF	Jigger Statz	153	584	181	.310	2	.380
SS	Ike McAuley	177	665	199	.299	0	.361
1B	Art Griggs	177	678	199	.294	10	.445
3B/2B	Bert Niehoff	179	646	189	.293	11	.432
LF	Dixie Carroll	180	686	200	.292	3	.410
C	Oscar Stanage	96	323	90	.279	0	.328
CF	Red Killefer	103	349	95	.272	1	.341
3B	Howard Lindimore	132	457	123	.269	1	.352
C	Red Baldwin	108	339	82	.242	1	.298

=== Pitching ===
Note: G = Games pitched; IP = Innings pitched; W = Wins; L = Losses; PCT = Win percentage; ERA = Earned run average

Player	G	IP	W	L	PCT	ERA
Doc Crandall	40	328.0	24	13	.649	3.13
Vic Aldridge	33	283.0	20	10	.667	2.16
Art Reinhart	36	233.0	15	5	.750	3.05
Tom Hughes	36	241.0	14	14	.500	2.84
Tony Lyons	41	232.0	14	14	.500	3.92
Claude Thomas	42	225.0	12	7	.632	3.52
Nick Dumovich	34	148.0	8	7	.533	2.61
