= Art Thomason =

American baseball player (1889-1944)

- Outfielder
- Born: February 12, 1889; Liberty, Missouri, U.S.
- Died: May 2, 1944 (aged 55); Kansas City, Missouri, U.S.
- Batted: Left Threw: Left

MLB debut
- August 10, 1910, for the Cleveland Naps

Last MLB appearance
- August 27, 1910, for the Cleveland Naps

MLB statistics
- Batting average: .171
- Home runs: 0
- Runs batted in: 2
- Stats at Baseball Reference

Teams
- Cleveland Naps (1910)

Arthur Wilson Thomason (February 12, 1889 – May 2, 1944) was an American Major League Baseball outfielder who played for one season. He played in 20 games for the Cleveland Naps during the 1910 season. He was later the player/manager of the Rock Island Islanders of the Mississippi Valley League from 1922 to 1923.
