= Harry Kirsch =

American baseball player (1887-1925)

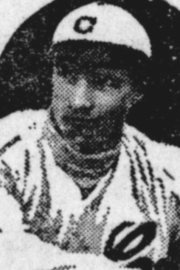
- Pitcher
- Born: October 17, 1887; Pittsburgh, Pennsylvania
- Died: December 25, 1925 (aged 38); Philadelphia, Pennsylvania
- Batted: Right Threw: Right

MLB debut
- April 16, 1910, for the Cleveland Naps

Last MLB appearance
- April 28, 1910, for the Cleveland Indians

MLB statistics
- Pitching Record: 0-0
- Earned run average: 6.00
- Strikeouts: 5
- Stats at Baseball Reference

Teams
- Cleveland Naps (1910)

Harry Louis Kirsch (October 17, 1887 – December 25, 1925), nicknamed "Casey", was a Major League Baseball pitcher who played for one season. He pitched in two games for the Cleveland Naps during the 1910 Cleveland Naps season.
