= Jack Mills (baseball) =

American baseball player (1889-1973)

- Third baseman
- Born: October 23, 1889; South Williamstown, Massachusetts, U.S.
- Died: June 3, 1973 (aged 83); Washington, D.C., U.S.
- Batted: Left Threw: Right

MLB debut
- July 1, 1911, for the Cleveland Naps

Last MLB appearance
- August 19, 1911, for the Cleveland Naps

MLB statistics
- Batting average: .294
- Home runs: 0
- Runs batted in: 1
- Stats at Baseball Reference

Teams
- Cleveland Naps (1911)

Abbott Paige "Jack" Mills (October 23, 1889 – June 3, 1973) was an American Major League Baseball third baseman who played for one season. He played for the Cleveland Naps during the 1911 Cleveland Naps season. He graduated from Williams College in 1911.
