= Jim Rutherford (baseball) =

American baseball player (1886-1956)

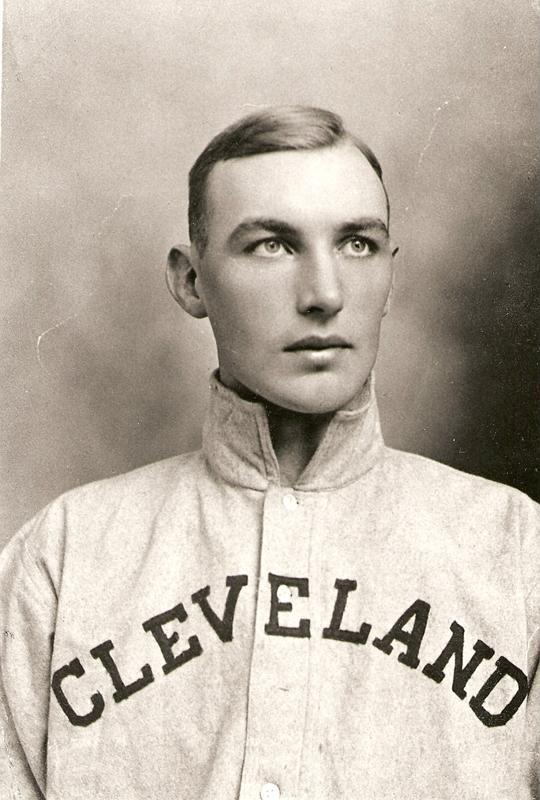
- Outfielder
- Born: September 26, 1886; Stillwater, Minnesota, U.S.
- Died: September 18, 1956 (aged 69); Lakewood, Ohio, U.S.
- Batted: Left Threw: Right

MLB debut
- July 12, 1910, for the Cleveland Naps

Last MLB appearance
- July 12, 1910, for the Cleveland Naps

MLB statistics
- Batting average: .500
- Home runs: 0
- Runs batted in: 0
- Stats at Baseball Reference

Teams
- Cleveland Naps (1910)

James Hollis Rutherford (September 26, 1886 – September 18, 1956) was an American Major League Baseball center fielder who played for one season. He played for the Cleveland Naps for one game on July 12 during the 1910 Cleveland Naps season. He attended Cornell University.
