= Wyatt Emory Cooper =

American writer and actor (1927–1978)

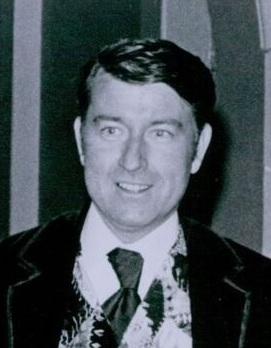
- Cooper in 1970
- Born: September 1, 1927; Pleasant Grove, Mississippi, U.S.
- Died: January 5, 1978 (aged 50); New York City, U.S.
- Burial place: Vanderbilt Family Cemetery and Mausoleum
- Education: University of California at Los Angeles
- Occupations: Author, screenwriter, and actor
- Years active: 1950–1975
- Spouse: Gloria Vanderbilt (m. 1963)
- Children: 2, including Anderson Cooper

Wyatt Emory Cooper (September 1, 1927 – January 5, 1978) was an American author, screenwriter, and actor. He was the fourth husband of Vanderbilt family heiress and socialite Gloria Vanderbilt and the father of CNN anchor Anderson Cooper.

== Life and career ==
Cooper had his childhood in Pleasant Grove, Mississippi, United States. Cooper was from a poor family with deep Southern roots, and later moved to New Orleans, Louisiana, as a young child. He graduated from the University of California at Los Angeles (UCLA), where he majored in theater arts and began a career in acting.

In his thirties, Cooper lived in Los Angeles, attended both UCLA and UC Berkeley, and worked as a screenwriter. While residing in West Hollywood, then an unincorporated area of Los Angeles County, Cooper lived near Dorothy Parker and her husband Alan Campbell. A close friendship developed, and a year after Parker's death in 1967, Cooper published an incisive and widely read profile in Esquire magazine, titled, "Whatever You Think Dorothy Parker Was Like, She Wasn't".

His writing includes the 1962 film The Chapman Report, the 1972 film The Glass House, and the 1975 book Families: A Memoir and a Celebration.

== Personal life ==
On December 24, 1963, he married heiress Gloria Vanderbilt, becoming her fourth husband. The couple frequently appeared on the national "best-dressed" list. They had two sons: Carter Vanderbilt Cooper (1965–1988) and Anderson Hays Cooper (born 1967), who is an anchor for CNN.

Cooper wrote in his 1975 memoir, "It is in the family that we learn almost all we ever know of loving. In my sons' youth, their promise, their possibilities, my stake in immortality is invested." He died in Manhattan on January 5, 1978, at age 50, during open heart surgery, after having a heart attack the previous December.

== Written works ==
- Families: A Memoir and a Celebration (Harper & Row, 1975) ISBN 0-06-010857-6
