= Harry Fanwell =

American baseball player (1886–1965)

- Pitcher
- Born: October 16, 1886; Patapsco, Maryland, U.S.
- Died: July 15, 1965 (aged 78); Somerville, New Jersey, U.S.
- Batted: Left Threw: Right

MLB debut
- July 23, 1910, for the Cleveland Naps

Last MLB appearance
- October 1, 1910, for the Cleveland Naps

MLB statistics
- Pitching Record: 2-9
- Earned run average: 3.62
- Strikeouts: 30
- Stats at Baseball Reference

Teams
- Cleveland Naps (1910)

Harry Clayton Fanwell (October 16, 1886 – July 15, 1965) was an American Major League Baseball pitcher who played for one season. He pitched 17 games for the Cleveland Naps during the 1910 Cleveland Naps season.
