= The Chapman Report =

1962 film by George Cukor

- Theatrical poster
- Directed by: George Cukor
- Screenplay by: Wyatt Cooper; Don Mankiewicz
- Adaptation by: Gene Allen; Grant Stuart
- Based on: The Chapman Report; 1960 novel by Irving Wallace
- Produced by: Darryl F. Zanuck; Richard D. Zanuck
- Starring: Efrem Zimbalist Jr; Shelley Winters; Jane Fonda; Claire Bloom; Glynis Johns; Ray Danton; Ty Hardin; Andrew Duggan; John Dehner
- Cinematography: Harold Lipstein
- Edited by: Robert L. Simpson
- Music by: Leonard Rosenman
- Distributed by: Warner Bros. Pictures
- Release date: October 5, 1962 (Chicago)
- Running time: 125 minutes
- Country: United States
- Language: English
- Box office: $2.5 million (US/Canada rentals)

The Chapman Report is a 1962 American drama film starring Shelley Winters, Jane Fonda, Claire Bloom and Glynis Johns. Directed by George Cukor, the film was produced by Darryl F. Zanuck (who previously worked at Warner Bros. Pictures until 1933) and Richard D. Zanuck. Adapted from Irving Wallace's 1960 novel of the same title, the screenplay was written by Wyatt Cooper and Don Mankiewicz.

== Plot ==
Noted psychologist Dr. George C. Chapman, his assistant Paul Radford and their staff are flying around the country conducting an anonymous sex survey of American women. They come to Los Angeles looking for volunteers in an affluent community called Briarwood. In a speech to the Briarwood Women's Club, Chapman says that “Too many women suffer from too little knowledge about a subject that occupies a major and crucial part of their lives...My associates and I believe that through our findings these women will come to realize that sex is decent, clean and dignified.“

The turnout at the club is lower than expected – 82 instead of 150 women–because Dr. Jonas is campaigning against the project. He tells Radford that he deplores the fact that all their research and writing is devoted to the physical act. “This is separating sex from affection, warmth, tenderness, devotion.” Dr. Jonas insists that by not discussing love at all, they allow people to believe – incorrectly – that the data on the physical act are the way to measure love. “People read the digits, make the comparisons, and then label themselves either normal or abnormal.” Dr. Jonas is also very concerned that the interviews, with their probing questions, may stir up trouble for some women – with no follow-through to help them. Radford later tells Chapman that Jonas has some good points.

The film follows four of the participants:

Kathleen Barclay is a young widow who thinks she is frigid because, not long before he died, her husband told her she was. She breaks down in tears during the interview (conducted by Radford), drops her purse and flees. When Radford returns her wallet, she recognizes his voice. She becomes distraught, protesting that she “is not one of his pathological cases.” However, she and Radford fall in love, and she comes to terms with her fears.

Teresa Harnish, a vivacious, happily married woman, recognizes her interviewer as Dr. Chapman. She records everything to play back for her husband. Listening, she suddenly thinks they may be abnormal – abnormally boring. Her pursuit of brawny, young football player Ed Kraski ends in farce. When he finally understands what she wants, he grabs her eagerly, and her fantasy dissolves in his clumsy, bone-crushing embrace. “You can't toss me around like a football,” she declares and runs for home.

Sarah Garnell is a middle-aged wife and mother whose lover, the young director of the local little theater, Fred Linden, is supposedly separated from his wife. Her husband, Frank, thinks all is well. When she is interviewed, she classifies their sexual relationship as “tolerable”. They have sex every Saturday. She describes her affair, weeping. The subsequent questions make her think for the first time about the future, and she eventually decides to leave her husband. She leaves a note and her wedding ring for Frank and goes to Fred's boat to find Fred's wife, waiting. Fred won't see her. Sarah goes back to her stricken husband, who tells her that he meant “for better or for worse” and returns her ring.

Divorcée Naomi Shields is a promiscuous alcoholic who may be suffering from what is currently referred to as hypersexuality. When we first see her, she seduces a stranger, water-delivery guy Bob Jensen. Wash Dillon, an unsavory jazz musician who lives down the block, takes her to a rundown apartment and they have sex. When she wakes up, Dillon allows his friends to gang rape her, then dumps her in her driveway. When the time comes for her interview, she first says that she had sex with many in her early teens, then that it was not until after she was 21. She cheated on her husband constantly. The marriage ended when he found her with a 20-year-old neighbor. She now wants “to crawl back to the musician.” She attempted suicide after the rape, but swallowed too many pills and threw up. She goes home, calls Dillon and tells him she'll leave the door open. This time, she takes just enough pills. When she is found dead, Dr. Jonas blames the interview as a contributing factor. Radford says she was lost long ago.

Dr. Chapman and Radford are reviewing the data from the Briarwood interviews. They pause to reflect on the reassuring statistics showing that the vast majority of American marriages are happy. Radford shares the news: He and Kathy are engaged.

== Cast ==
- Shelley Winters as Sarah Garnell
- Jane Fonda as Kathleen Barclay
- Claire Bloom as Naomi Shields
- Glynis Johns as Teresa Harnish
- Efrem Zimbalist Jr as Paul Radford
- Ray Danton as Fred Linden
- Ty Hardin as Ed Kraski
- Andrew Duggan as Dr. George C. Chapman
- John Dehner as Geoffrey Harnish
- Harold J. Stone as Frank Garnell
- Corey Allen as Wash Dillon
- Jennifer Howard as Grace Waterton
- Cloris Leachman as Miss Selby
- Chad Everett as Bob Jensen
- Henry Daniell as Dr. Jonas
- Jack Cassidy as Ted Dyson

== Production ==
Based on Irving Wallace's novel that was based on the Kinsey Reports, the film was originally conceived for 20th Century Fox to attract customers with discussions and depictions of sexual matters that would not be allowed on American television. Darryl F. Zanuck was having problems with Fox during the production of two widescreen epic spectacular films for the studio in Europe, Cleopatra and The Longest Day at the same time. When Fox would not do the film, Zanuck offered the property, his son the producer, director Cukor and the female stars to his friend and rival Jack L. Warner.

Warner Bros. Pictures replaced the film's planned male leads with their own Warner Bros. Television contract leads who received no extra money to do the film. Warner Bros. felt that casting these performers would attract their fans to the film, while at the same time pleasing the stars who had requested more interesting and different material than they had at Warners. Efrem Zimbalist Jr was given top billing over the four female stars, however in posters produced in some overseas countries his name was shifted down in favour of the better known Shelley Winters and Jane Fonda.

Andrew Duggan played a character based on Dr. Alfred Kinsey; Efrem Zimbalist Jr played one of his researchers, who meets and interviews the four women depicted in the film. The leading ladies consist of Shelley Winters as an adulterous middle-aged housewife having an affair with artist Ray Danton; Jane Fonda as a young widow who believes she is frigid but who is in fact reacting to her husband's violence during sex; Glynis Johns as a trendy older woman infatuated with athletic young beach boy Ty Hardin; and Claire Bloom as a “nymphomaniac”.

Costume designer Orry-Kelly dressed each of the different female characters in only one color throughout the film.

As many as seven different writers worked on the film with Gene Allen, who was contracted to Cukor's organisation delivering the final screenplay. The film attracted much criticism during its production by the Legion of Decency amongst others.

== Reception ==
After a screening at San Francisco where Cukor claimed the audience liked the film, the studio recut the film. At the Legion of Decency's insistence, Jack Warner had Michael A. Hoey re-edit the film and wrote a different ending with Zimbalist and Duggan saying that American women were rather normal sexually, a message at odds with the rest of Cukor's film. A different director was brought in to reshoot it. Cukor said of Bloom: "Claire is not a nice Nellie. She has no inhibitions, and she is not as cold as some people say."

The film attracted criticism for being "the sexiest mainstream movie ever made". Upon the film's general release, The New York Times wrote "the four adapters use four case histories of abnormal sexual behavior of upper middle-class women of a Los Angeles suburb who subject themselves to the testing of a psychologist's team of investigators. They touch, unfortunately only superficially, on a frigid type, a nymphomaniac-alcoholic, a confused, bored mother and a gay, flighty intellectual seeking enlightenment in romance. The interplay and lack of depth in the treatment of these glimpses at the intimate life sometimes appear more prurient than scientific. And a viewer's emotions rarely, if ever, are fully engaged in following the affairs."

Variety magazine anticipated that it would earn theatrical rentals of $4 million in the United States and Canada in its annual box office chart for 1962 however, revised this downwards the following year to $2.5 million.

The film was rated M in New Zealand for violence and sex scenes, and it was previously rated R18.

== See also ==
- List of American films of 1962
