= Fred Winchell =

American baseball player (1882–1958)

- Pitcher
- Born: January 23, 1882; Arlington, Massachusetts, US
- Died: August 8, 1958 (aged 76); Toronto, Ontario, Canada
- Batted: Unknown Threw: Right

MLB debut
- September 16, 1909, for the Cleveland Naps

Last MLB appearance
- October 3, 1909, for the Cleveland Naps

MLB statistics
- Win–loss record: 0-3
- Earned run average: 6.28
- Strikeouts: 7
- Stats at Baseball Reference

Teams
- Cleveland Naps (1909)

Frederick Russell Winchell (born Frederick Cook, January 23, 1882 – August 8, 1958) was an American professional baseball pitcher. He appeared in four games in Major League Baseball for the Cleveland Naps during the 1909 season.

Winchell played college baseball at Princeton University.
