= Milo Netzel =

American baseball player (1886-1938)

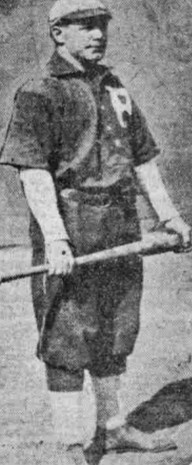
- Third baseman
- Born: May 12, 1886; Eldred, Pennsylvania, U.S.
- Died: March 18, 1938 (aged 51); Oxnard, California, U.S.
- Batted: Left Threw: Left

MLB debut
- September 16, 1909, for the Cleveland Naps

Last MLB appearance
- October 3, 1909, for the Cleveland Naps

MLB statistics
- Batting average: .189
- Home runs: 0
- Runs batted in: 3
- Stats at Baseball Reference

Teams
- Cleveland Naps (1909)

Miles Albion Netzel (May 12, 1886 – March 18, 1938) was an American Major League Baseball third baseman who played for one season. He played in ten games for the Cleveland Naps during the 1909 Cleveland Naps season.
