= Duke Reilley =

American baseball player (1884-1968)

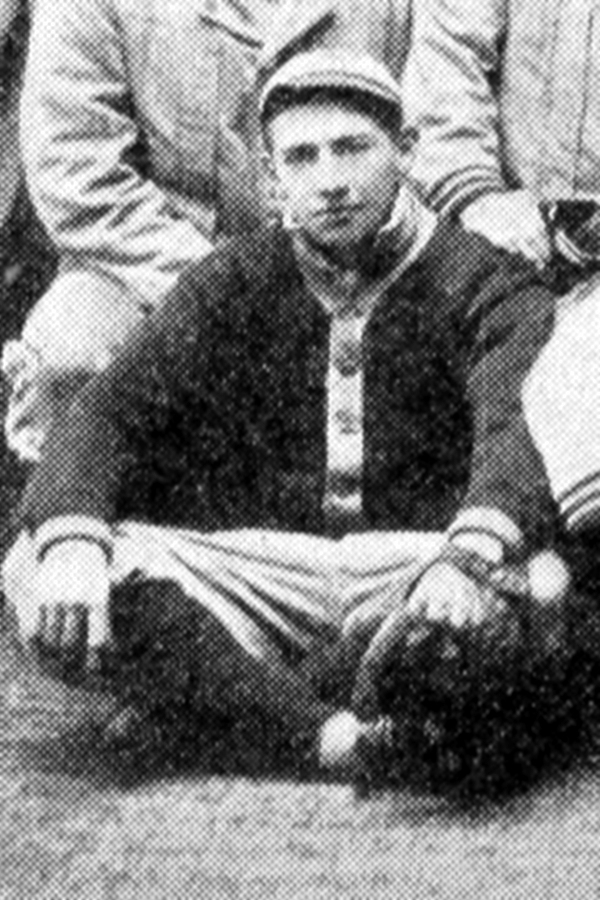
- Outfielder
- Born: August 25, 1884; Chicago, Illinois, U.S.
- Died: March 4, 1968 (aged 83); Indianapolis, Indiana, U.S.
- Batted: Switch Threw: Right

MLB debut
- August 28, 1909, for the Cleveland Naps

Last MLB appearance
- September 28, 1909, for the Cleveland Naps

MLB statistics
- Batting average: .210
- Home runs: 0
- Runs batted in: 0
- Stats at Baseball Reference

Teams
- Cleveland Naps (1909)

Alexander Aloysius "Duke" Reilley (August 25, 1884 – March 4, 1968), nicknamed "Midget", was an American Major League Baseball left fielder who played for one season. He played for the Cleveland Naps for 20 games during the 1909 Cleveland Naps season.
