= Pleasant Grove, Mississippi =

Unincorporated community in Mississippi, US

- Unincorporated community
- Location within Mississippi Location within the United States
- Coordinates: 34°26′21″N 90°05′22″W
- Country: United States
- State: Mississippi
- County: Panola
- Elevation: 325 ft (99 m)
- Time zone: UTC-6 (Central (CST))
  - Summer (DST): UTC-5 (CDT)
- Area code: 662
- GNIS feature ID: 675981

Pleasant Grove is an unincorporated community in Panola County, Mississippi. Pleasant Grove is approximately 10 miles (16 km) west of Sardis, along Mississippi Highway 315.

== History ==
In 1900, Pleasant Grove had two churches, several stores, and a population of 62.

A post office first began operating under the name Pleasant Grove in 1872.

The Pleasant Grove Methodist Church and Pleasant Grove Cemetery are located there. The Pleasant Grove Volunteer Fire Department services the community. The Pleasant Grove School has been demolished.

== Notable people ==
- Wyatt Emory Cooper, author and father of Anderson Cooper
- Big Daddy Kinsey, musician
- Willie Mitchell, professional baseball player
