= Earl Yingling =

American baseball player (1888–1962)

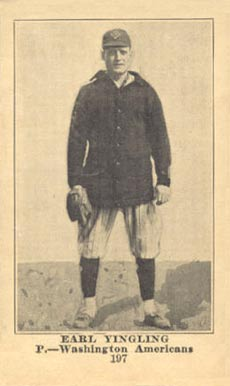
- Pitcher
- Born: October 29, 1888; Chillicothe, Ohio, U.S.
- Died: October 2, 1962 (aged 73); Columbus, Ohio, U.S.
- Batted: Left Threw: Left

MLB debut
- April 12, 1911, for the Cleveland Naps

Last MLB appearance
- May 23, 1918, for the Washington Senators

MLB statistics
- Win–loss record: 25-34
- Earned run average: 3.22
- Strikeouts: 192
- Stats at Baseball Reference

Teams
- Cleveland Naps (1911); Brooklyn Dodgers/Superbas (1912–13); Cincinnati Reds (1914); Washington Senators (1918)

Earl Hershey Yingling (October 29, 1888 – October 2, 1962) was an American professional baseball pitcher. He played all or part of five seasons in Major League Baseball for the Cleveland Naps (1911), Brooklyn Dodgers (1912–13), Cincinnati Reds (1914) and Washington Senators (1918).

Yingling was born in Chillicothe, Ohio and attended Steele High School in Dayton.

Yingling began his professional career with the Dayton Veterans from 1907 to 1909 and the Toledo Mud Hens from 1910 to 1911. He married Florine Sausser in 1908 after she said she would marry him if he struck out the next hitter, which he did. His best season between Toledo and Dayton was 1910, finishing the year with a win–loss record of 22–9 in 287 innings pitched.

Yingling made his major league debut for the Cleveland Naps on April 12, 1911, and pitched in four games for the team. After the 1911 season, he along with Pat Paige were selected by the Brooklyn Dodgers in the rule 5 draft. He spent the next two seasons with the Dodgers, going 6–11 with a 3.59 earned run average (ERA) in 1912 and 8–8 with a 2.58 ERA in 1913; he also had a .383 batting average in 40 games for the team in 1913. In one game for the Dodgers, Yingling threw only one pitch against the Cincinnati Reds, causing the batter to ground into a double play before being replaced; coming into a game to face one batter was a rare move at the time.

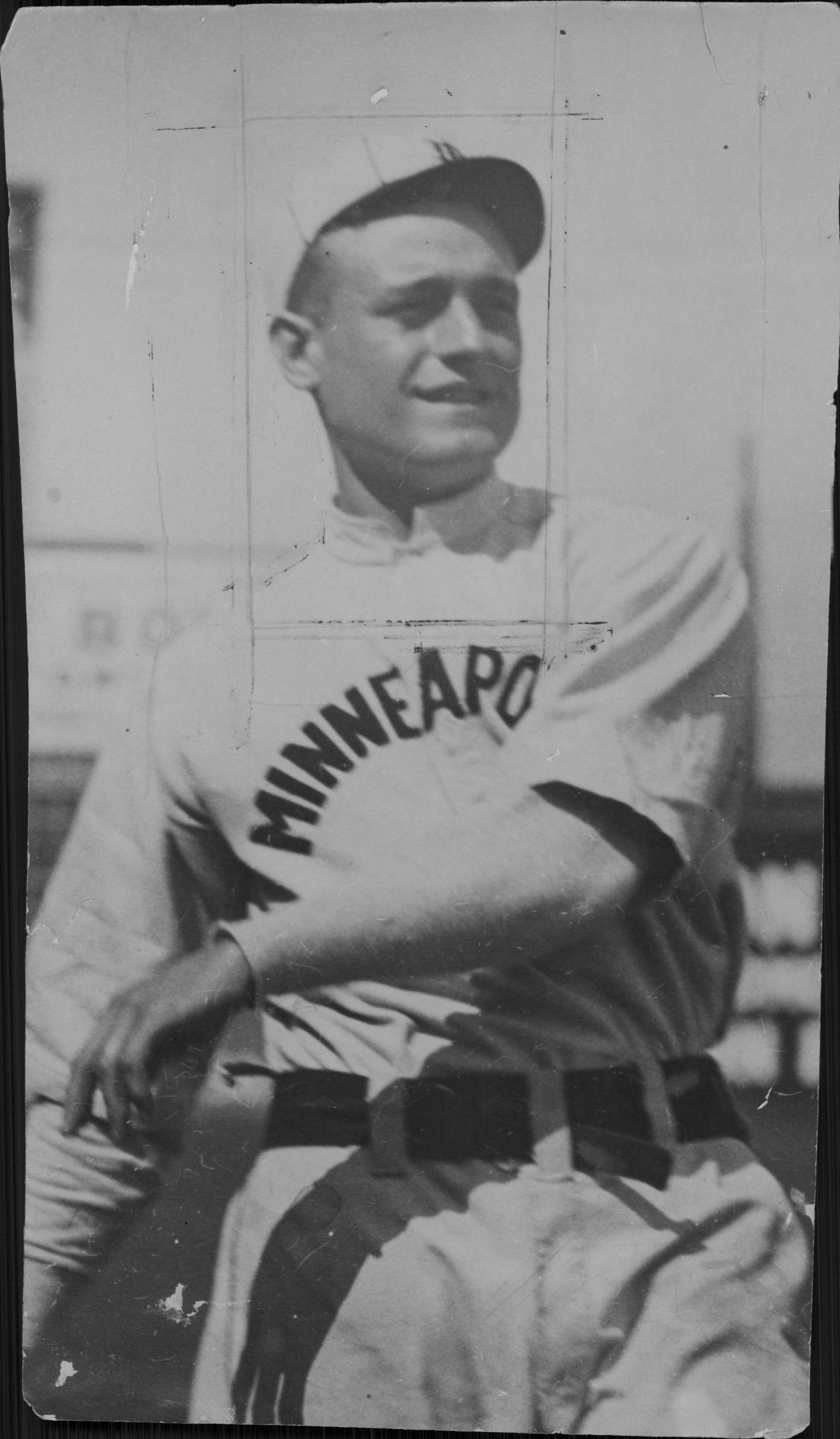
Yingling with the Minneapolis Millers, 1920s

After the 1913 season, Yingling was purchased by the Reds, where he had a 9–13 record and a 3.45 ERA in 34 games. He then spent the next two seasons with the Minneapolis Millers, winning 19 and 24 games, respectively. After considering retirement, the Washington Senators signed him to a contract just before the 1917 season. Yingling served in the military during World War I, and returned to Washington for the 1918 season. He pitched in five games for the team, then spent three more seasons with Minneapolis before retiring from the game. He died in Columbus, Ohio in 1962 at the age of 73.

== Sources ==
- Career statistics from Baseball Reference · Baseball Reference (Minors) · Retrosheet · Baseball Almanac
