= Mike McCormick (third baseman) =

Scottish baseball player (1882–1953)

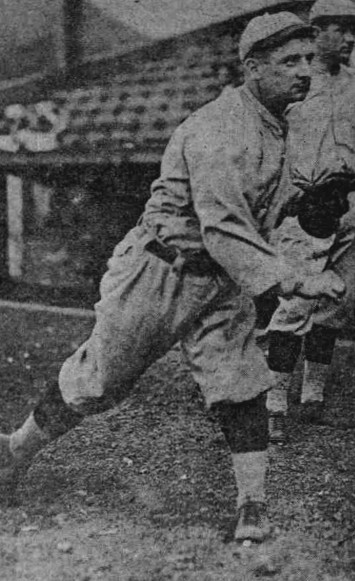
- Third baseman
- Born: October 22, 1882; Jersey City, New Jersey, U.S.
- Died: November 18, 1953 (aged 71); Jersey City, New Jersey, U.S.
- Batted: Right Threw: Right

MLB debut
- April 14, 1904, for the Brooklyn Superbas

Last MLB appearance
- August 31, 1904, for the Brooklyn Superbas

MLB statistics
- Batting average: .184
- Home runs: 0
- Runs batted in: 27
- Stats at Baseball Reference

Teams
- Brooklyn Superbas (1904)

Michael Joseph McCormick (October 22, 1882 – November 18, 1953), was an American professional baseball third baseman. He played one season in Major League Baseball for the 1904 Brooklyn Superbas which was managed by Baseball Hall of Famer Ned Hanlon.

== Professional career ==
=== Minor Leagues ===
McCormick began his baseball career in 1901 with the Connecticut State League Waterbury Rough Riders under Hall of Famer Roger Connor. After two years in Waterbury, McCormick joined the Holyoke Paperweights in 1903 before getting the call to join the Brooklyn Superbas.

=== Major Leagues ===
At 21 years old McCormick was the youngest player on the Superbas in 1904. He played in 105 of the team's 151 games, finishing with 64 hits and 28 runs scored and serving as the team's principal Third baseman where he boasted one of the best fielding percentages in the league at that position. The Superbas finished in sixth place in the National League that year.

=== Return to the Minors ===
After his year with the Superbas, McCormick played for a number of minor league teams:

- 1905: Holyoke Paperweights where he was player/manager
- 1906–1907: Nashville Vols as a shortstop under John Dobbs
- 1908–1912: St. Paul Saints under Mike Kelly
- 1913: Portland Beavers where he played shortstop and third base
- 1914: New Haven White Wings of the Eastern Association where he was player/manager.

=== Scouting ===
From 1915 to 1916 McCormick was a scout for the Brooklyn Robins.

== Personal life ==
McCormick was married to Jennie Kelly and lived most of his life in an area of Jersey City, New Jersey known as the Horseshoe. After baseball, he worked for Hudson County, New Jersey and was a Democratic committeeman in Jersey City.

At 5 feet 3 inches tall (160 cm), he is considered to be one of the shortest league ballplayers ever.

His last name is erroneously spelled "McCormack" in some references. His nicknames were "Kid" and "Dude".
