= Hi West =

American baseball player (1884-1963)

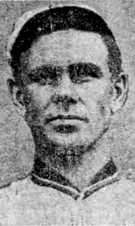
- Pitcher
- Born: August 8, 1884; Roseville, Illinois, U.S.
- Died: May 24, 1963 (aged 78); Los Angeles, California, U.S.
- Batted: Right Threw: Right

MLB debut
- September 8, 1905, for the Cleveland Naps

Last MLB appearance
- July 2, 1911, for the Cleveland Naps

MLB statistics
- Win–loss record: 5–6
- Earned run average: 3.87
- Strikeouts: 32
- Stats at Baseball Reference

Teams
- Cleveland Naps (1905, 1911)

James Hiram West (August 8, 1884 – May 25, 1963) was an American Major League Baseball pitcher who played for two seasons. He pitched in six games for the Cleveland Naps during the 1905 season and 13 games during the 1911 season. He attended Knox College and Lombard College.
