= Red Booles =

American baseball player (1880-1955)

- Pitcher
- Born: July 14, 1880; Bernice, Louisiana
- Died: March 16, 1955 (aged 74); Monroe, Louisiana
- Batted: Left Threw: Right

MLB debut
- July 30, 1909, for the Cleveland Naps

Last MLB appearance
- August 20, 1909, for the Cleveland Naps

MLB statistics
- Win–loss record: 0–1
- Earned run average: 1.99
- Strikeouts: 6
- Stats at Baseball Reference

Teams
- Cleveland Naps (1909)

Seabron Jesse “Red” Booles (July 14, 1880 – March 16, 1955) was a Major League Baseball pitcher who played for one season. He played for the Cleveland Naps from July 30, 1909, to August 20, 1909.
