= Jerry Upp =

American baseball player (1883-1937)

- Pitcher
- Born: December 10, 1883; Sandusky, Ohio, U.S.
- Died: June 30, 1937 (aged 53); Sandusky, Ohio, U.S.
- Batted: Unknown Threw: Left

MLB debut
- September 2, 1909, for the Cleveland Naps

Last MLB appearance
- September 27, 1909, for the Cleveland Naps

MLB statistics
- Win–loss record: 2-1
- Earned run average: 1.69
- Strikeouts: 13
- Stats at Baseball Reference

Teams
- Cleveland Naps (1909)

George Henry "Jerry" Upp (December 10, 1883 – June 30, 1937) was an American pitcher in Major League Baseball in 1909 for the Cleveland Naps. He played in seven games, starting four of them, pitching 26.2 innings. His earned run average was 1.69.
