= Rip Egan =

American baseball player and umpire (1871–1950)

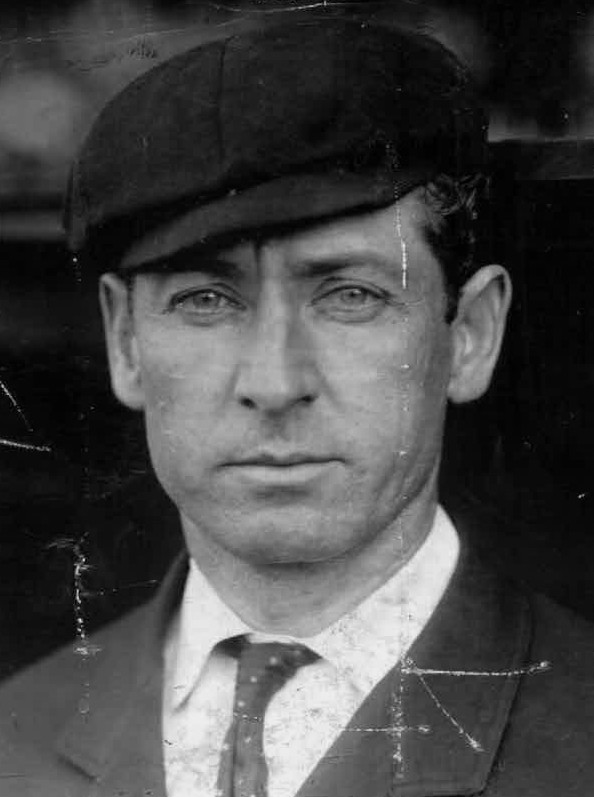
- Pitcher / Umpire
- Born: July 9, 1871; Philadelphia, Pennsylvania, U.S.
- Died: December 22, 1950 (aged 79); Cranston, Rhode Island, U.S.
- Batted: Unknown Threw: Right

MLB debut
- April 30, 1894, for the Washington Senators

Last MLB appearance
- April 30, 1894, for the Washington Senators

MLB statistics
- Win–loss record: 0–0
- Earned run average: 10.80
- Strikeouts: 2
- Stats at Baseball Reference

Teams
- Washington Senators (1894)

John Joseph "Rip" Egan (July 9, 1871 – December 22, 1950) was an American professional baseball player (pitcher) throwing right-handed and later an umpire. Egan played seven seasons in professional baseball, including one in Major League Baseball. On April 30, 1894, Egan made his major league debut with the Washington Senators. In his only game, Egan gave-up six runs, all earned and struck out two. After his playing career was over, Egan managed in the minor leagues and was a major league umpire. Egan was sometimes known as "Jack". He was born in Philadelphia, Pennsylvania, married Eleanor McGarrahan (July 14, 1898) and raised two daughters, Judith and Eleanor.

== Playing career ==
Egan began his professional playing career in 1894 with the minor league Providence Clamdiggers of the Eastern League. Later that season, Egan was signed by the major league Washington Senators. In his debut on April 30, 1894, Egan pitched five innings and gave-up five runs. That game would prove to be his final major league game as a player. Egan continued to play in the minor leagues in 1895. That season, he played for the Class-B Omaha Omahogs of the Western Association. With the Omahogs, Egan went 16–14 in 36 games, 31 starts with one shutout. For the next two seasons (1896–1897), Egan played for the Class-A Detroit Tigers (a minor league team at the time) of the Western League. Statistics were not kept during his first season with the Tigers, however, during his second Egan went 11–14 with a 3.36 earned run average (ERA), one shutout and 64 strikeouts in 29 games, 24 starts. In 1898, Egan joined the Class-A Kansas City Blues, also of the Western League. He went 16–12 with five shutouts in 31 games, 27 starts. That season, Egan led the league in shutouts. He spent his final season with Kansas City in 1899. Statistics were not kept for that season. In 1900, Egan split the season between the Class-A Cleveland Lake Shores of the American League and the Class-B Omaha Omahogs of the Western League. With Omaha, Egan went 4–3 in seven games, all starts. Finally, with Cleveland, he went 1–1 in two games, both starts. He was released from Cleveland in mid-May because the team had to make cuts in their payroll. That year would prove to be his final season as a player in professional baseball.

== Umpire career ==
From 1907 to 1914, Egan was an umpire in the American League. Egan is cited as a "highly regarded" umpire. However, during the 1908 season, he took criticism from the Cleveland press because of a call he made in a "key late-season game" between the Cleveland Naps and the St. Louis Cardinals. Egan umpired two no-hitters. The first was thrown by Frank Smith on September 20, 1908. The second no-hitter was thrown by Joe Benz on May 31, 1914. Egan was an umpire during the 1913 World Series. He was also an umpire in the Eastern League. After the 1914 season, Egan was not retained by the American League and there was speculation that he would join the Federal League.

== Later life ==
In 1918, Egan began his managerial career with the minor league Milwaukee Brewers. Next season, he managed the minor league Class-A Minneapolis Millers. In 1920, he returned to the Brewers and his tenure ended after the 1921 season. During his time with the Brewers, it was reported that while riding the same train back to Milwaukee as the Kansas City Blues, Egan served alcohol to their pitcher until 3 a.m. in hopes of keeping the Blues from playing at full potential for the doubleheader they were scheduled to play the next day against the Brewers. His trick did not work as Milwaukee was held to just two hits. In 1926, Egan was the manager and president of the Scranton Miners. In the 1930s, Egan coached baseball at Providence College. Egan was also a scout for the Boston Red Sox and the Pittsburgh Pirates. During his time with the Red Sox, he was responsible for signing numerous players including Ray Champagne, and Mickey Harris. The Pittsburgh Post-Gazette described Egan as having "one of the finest all-around records and backgrounds in baseball today" after he signed with the Pirates as a scout in 1946. On December 22, 1950, Egan died in Cranston, Rhode Island and was buried in Section 5, Lot 155 at St. Ann Cemetery.

== See also ==
- List of Major League Baseball umpires (disambiguation)
