= Walt Doan =

American baseball player

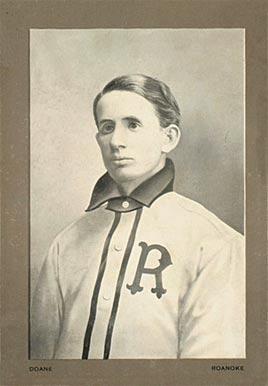
- Pitcher
- Born: March 12, 1887; Bellevue, Idaho
- Died: October 19, 1935 (aged 48); Coatesville, Pennsylvania, U.S.
- Batted: Left Threw: Right

MLB debut
- September 20, 1909, for the Cleveland Naps

Last MLB appearance
- September 14, 1910, for the Cleveland Naps

MLB statistics
- Win–loss record: 0–1
- Earned run average: 5.56
- Strikeouts: 9
- Stats at Baseball Reference

Teams
- Cleveland Naps (1909–1910)

Walter Rudolph Doan (March 12, 1887 – October 19, 1935) was an American professional baseball pitcher for the Cleveland Naps during parts of the 1909 and 1910 seasons. In his career, Doan pitched 22.2 innings and posted a 5.56 ERA.
