= Jim Baskette =

American baseball player (1887-1942)

- Pitcher
- Born: December 10, 1887; Athens, Tennessee, U.S.
- Died: July 30, 1942 (aged 54); Athens, Tennessee, U.S.
- Batted: Right Threw: Right

MLB debut
- September 22, 1911, for the Cleveland Naps

Last MLB appearance
- May 9, 1913, for the Cleveland Naps

MLB statistics
- Win–loss record: 9–6
- Earned run average: 3.30
- Strikeouts: 59
- Stats at Baseball Reference

Teams
- Cleveland Naps (1911–1913)

James Blaine Baskette (December 10, 1887 – July 30, 1942) was an American Major League Baseball (MLB) pitcher who played for three seasons. He played for the Cleveland Naps.
