= Lucky Wright =

American baseball player (1880-1941)

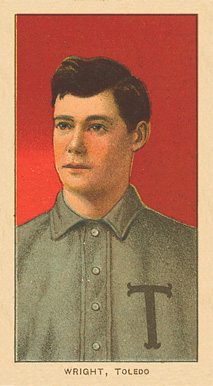
- Wright depicted with the Toledo Mud Hens on a 1909–11 T206 tobacco card
- Pitcher
- Born: February 21, 1880; Waterville, Ohio, U.S.
- Died: July 8, 1941 (aged 61); Tontogany, Ohio, U.S.
- Batted: Right Threw: Right

MLB debut
- April 18, 1909, for the Cleveland Naps

Last MLB appearance
- May 18, 1909, for the Cleveland Naps

MLB statistics
- Win–loss record: 0–4
- Earned run average: 3.21
- Strikeouts: 5
- Stats at Baseball Reference

Teams
- Cleveland Naps (1909)

William Simmons "Lucky" Wright (February 21, 1880 – July 6, 1941) was an American professional baseball pitcher. He appeared in five games in Major League Baseball for the Cleveland Naps in 1909, though he was never "Lucky" enough to win a Major League game in his career.
