= Pat Paige =

American baseball player (1882-1939)

- Pitcher
- Born: May 5, 1882; Paw Paw, Michigan, U.S.
- Died: June 8, 1939 (aged 57); Berlin, Wisconsin, U.S.
- Batted: Left Threw: Right

MLB debut
- May 20, 1911, for the Cleveland Naps

Last MLB appearance
- June 1, 1911, for the Cleveland Naps

MLB statistics
- Win–loss record: 1–0
- Earned run average: 4.50
- Strikeouts: 6
- Stats at Baseball Reference

Teams
- Cleveland Naps (1911)

George Lynn Paige (May 5, 1882 in Paw Paw, Michigan – June 8, 1939 in Berlin, Wisconsin), nicknamed "Piggy", was an American Major League Baseball pitcher who played for one season. He pitched in two games for the Cleveland Naps during the 1911 Cleveland Naps season.
