= John W. Weimer =

American football, basketball, and baseball player and coach

Biographical details
- Born: November 13, 1883; Reading, Pennsylvania, U.S.
- Died: November 30, 1940 (aged 57); York, Pennsylvania, U.S.
- Education: Gettysburg

Playing career

Baseball
- 1906–1907: Dubois Miners
- 1908: Oil City Oilers
- 1908: Harrisburg Senators
- 1908: New Castle Nocks
- 1909–1910: New Orleans Pelicans
- 1911–1913: Albany Babies
- 1915: Gettysburg Patriots

Coaching career (HC unless noted)

Football
- 1911–1917: Bloomsburg
- 1919: Allentown HS (PA)

Basketball
- 1911–1919: Bloomsburg

Head coaching record
- Overall: 32–22–6 (college football); 40–39 (college basketball)

John William "Jake" Weimer (November 13, 1883 – November 30, 1940) was an American football, basketball, and baseball player and coach. He served as the head football coach at Allentown High School in Allentown, Pennsylvania during the 1919 season.
