= Bill Lindsay (third baseman) =

American baseball player (1881-1963)

William "Bill" Lindsay
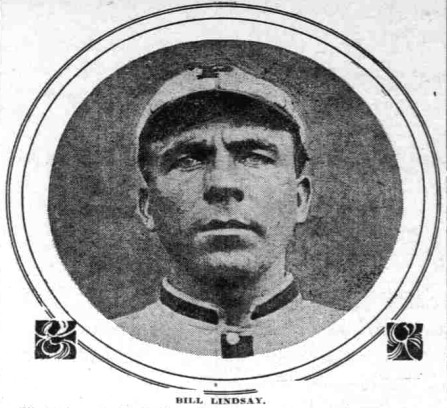
- Baseball
- Born: February 24, 1881; Madison, North Carolina, U.S.
- Died: July 14, 1963 (aged 82); Greensboro, North Carolina, U.S.
- Batted: Left Threw: Right

MLB debut
- June 21, 1911, for the Cleveland Naps

Last MLB appearance
- July 23, 1911, for the Cleveland Naps

MLB statistics
- Batting average: .242
- Home runs: 0
- Runs batted in: 5
- Stats at Baseball Reference

Teams
- Cleveland Naps (1911)

William Gibbon Lindsay (February 24, 1881 in Madison, North Carolina – July 14, 1963 in Greensboro, North Carolina) was an American Major and Minor League baseball player. He batted left-handed and threw right-handed. Lindsay played several positions over his career, including second baseman, short stop and third baseman.

Lindsay's baseball career spanned from 1907 to 1916. The pinnacle of his career was playing for the Cleveland Indians (known then as the Cleveland Naps) in 1911.

Lindsay was often referred to as "The Professor" due to his older age and college education. Lindsay was well educated in an era where few ballplayers experienced a formal education. He graduated from Guilford College in Greensboro, North Carolina. Lindsay also received an undergraduate degree at Haverford College. For post-graduate studies, he attended law school at Tulane University., Harvard University and University of Chicago. He also played one season for the University of Chicago baseball team.

Lindsay's first year in professional baseball was in 1907 playing for the Sumter, SC Gamecocks in the South Carolina League. Later that season he was sold to the Norfolk Tars of the Virginia League. In 1908 he was signed to play for Winston-Salem Dash (known then as the Twins) in the Carolina Association. As the season came to a close his manager, Nick Carter (who was a player/manager) decided to go back to Memphis to play with the Memphis Egyptians (later the Memphis Chicks) of the Southern Association. He asked Lindsay to follow and become the everyday short stop. Bill played with Memphis for rest of the 1908 season as well as part of the 1909 season (team name changed to Memphis Turtles in 1909).

In the summer of 1909 Lindsay was traded to the New Orleans Pelicans, also of the Southern Association. Playing on this team is where he gained some of his notoriety. Lindsay remained with New Orleans for parts of 1909, 1910, 1911 and 1914. In 1910, the Pelicans won the Southern Association Championship with Lindsay at short stop. He played that season with a center fielder named Shoeless Joe Jackson.

With injuries to the great Nap Lajoie of the Cleveland Naps (named for Lajoie) during the early 1911 season, Lindsay's contract was bought by the team to help shore up the infield. He played his first major league game on June 21, 1911, against Ty Cobb and the Detroit Tigers. Players on the Cleveland team during this time were Shoeless Joe Jackson, Cy Young and Nap Lajoie. Once Lajoie recovered from his injuries, Lindsay was made expendable. Lindsay's last game with Cleveland was on July 23, 1911. This was one day short of getting to play in the first all-star game ever played in the major leagues. This game was known as the Addie Joss Benefit Game that benefited Addie Joss who had died earlier that year. This game pitted the best players in the American League versus the Naps. Lindsay ultimately played in 19 games with the Cleveland Naps. He batted .242 while mainly playing as a third baseman.

After he was made expendable by Cleveland, two separate American League clubs wanted to sign Lindsay but the Cleveland owner, Charles Somers, sent him to Cleveland's new farm team, the Portland Beavers. Charles Somers was one of the first owners to invest in "farm teams" as part of building a major league team. Lindsay spent parts of the 1911, 1912 and 1913 seasons with Portland of the Pacific Coast League.

Lindsay continued to play baseball for about four more years after his brief major league stint. He went back to play with New Orleans in 1914. In 1915 he played with both the Oakland Oaks of the Pacific Coast League and Birmingham Barons of the Southern Association. Lindsay's last season in professional baseball was 1916. He played parts of the 1916 season with Birmingham as well as Norfolk Tars of the Virginia League. For his career, Bill was a part of five pennant winning teams: 1907 (Sumter), 1910 (New Orleans), 1911 (Portland & New Orleans) and 1912 (Portland).

After baseball, Lindsay went on to become a successful businessman back in his home state of North Carolina alongside his wife (Sadie) and daughter (Margaret). He died in 1963 at the age of 82. Of note: His brother was World War I flying ace Robert Opie Lindsay.
