= Art Griggs =

American baseball player (1883–1938)

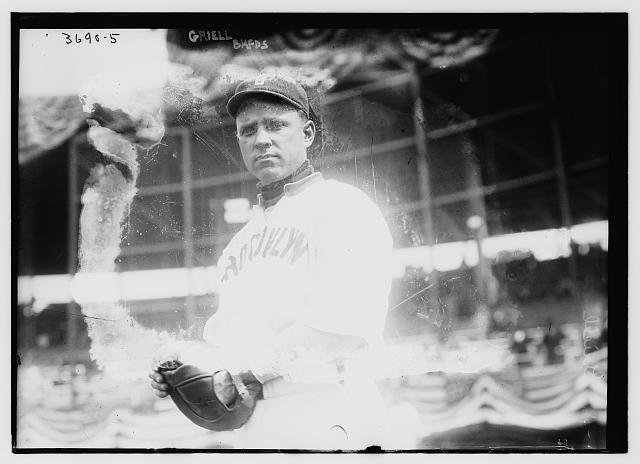
- Griggs with the Brooklyn Tip-Tops
- First baseman
- Born: December 10, 1883; Topeka, Kansas
- Died: December 19, 1938 (aged 55); Los Angeles, California
- Batted: Right Threw: Right

MLB debut
- May 2, 1909, for the St. Louis Browns

Last MLB appearance
- September 2, 1918, for the Detroit Tigers

MLB statistics
- Batting average: .277
- Home runs: 5
- Runs batted in: 155
- Stats at Baseball Reference

Teams
- St. Louis Browns (1909–1910); Cleveland Naps (1911–1912); Brooklyn Tip-Tops (1914–1915); Detroit Tigers (1918)

Arthur Carle Griggs (December 10, 1883 – December 19, 1938) was an American professional baseball player. He played seven seasons in Major League Baseball in Major League Baseball between 1909 and 1918, compiling a .277 batting average. He appeared in 442 major league games, including 195 games as a first baseman, 96 games as an outfielder, and 60 games as a second baseman.

== Early years ==
Griggs was born in 1883 in Topeka, Kansas. He attended Washburn University and later the University of Pittsburgh where he played college football at the halfback and fullback positions.

== Professional baseball player ==
Griggs played professional baseball for 22 years from 1905 to 1926. He played four years in the minors from 1905 to 1908, including stints with Ellsworth in the Kansas state League (1905) and with the Little Rock Travelers (1906), Lake Charles Creoles (1906), San Antonio Bronchos (1907-1908), and Shreveport Pirates (1908).

He made his major league debut in May 1909 with the St. Louis Browns. He appeared in 231 games for the Browns during the 1909 and 1910 seasons, compiling a .256 batting average. He played games at every position except pitcher and catcher for the Browns, including 66 games as a first baseman, and 49 games as a second baseman, 45 games as a right fielder, and 42 games as a left fielder.

Griggs next spent the 1911 and 1912 seasons with the Cleveland Indians. He compiled a .293 batting average and appeared in 116 games for Cleveland, including 72 games at first base and 11 games at second base.

He spent the 1913 season playing for the Montreal Royals in the International League, compiling a .293 batting average in 40 games.

In 1914, he signed with the Brooklyn Tip-Tops of the Federal League. He appeared in 67 games for the Tip-Tops, including 32 games at first base, during the 1914 and 1915 seasons. He compiled a .287 batting average with Brooklyn.

During the 1916 and 1917 seasons, he played in the Pacific Coast League (PCL) for the Vernon Tigers and Portland Beavers.

In 1918, Griggs began the season with the Sacramento Senators, compiling a .378 batting average and hitting 12 home runs in 89 games. In the second half of the 1918 season, he had a final stint in the major leagues, appearing in 28 games as a first baseman for the Detroit Tigers. He compiled a .364 batting average and .422 on-base percentage with the Tigers. He appeared in his final major league game on September 2, 1918.

Griggs returned to Sacramento in 1919, appearing in 148 games with nine home runs and a .288 batting average.

From 1920 to 1923, he played for the Los Angeles Angels of the PCL. He helped the 1921 Los Angeles Angels with the PCL pennant, leading the team with 69 extra-base hits and 302 total bases. In 1922, he hit .338 with 20 home runs and 49 doubles.

During the 1924 and 1925 seasons, Griggs played for the Omaha Buffaloes of the Western League. He hit a career-high 28 home runs for Omaha in 1925. He concluded his playing career in 1926 with the Seattle Indians of the PCL.

== Later years ==
After retiring as a player, Griggs was president and owner of teams in the Western and Texas Leagues. He became the owner of the Wichita team in the Western League in 1927. In 1932, he moved his club to Tulsa. He then transferred the Tulsa team from the Western League to the Texas League in 1933.

Griggs died in 1938 at age 55 at his home in Los Angeles. He had been ill for several weeks with Hodgkins disease.
