= Ben Demott =

American baseball player (1889-1963)

Ben DeMott
- Pitcher
- Born: April 2, 1889; Green Village, New Jersey, U.S.
- Died: July 5, 1963 (aged 74); Somerville, New Jersey, U.S.
- Batted: Right Threw: Right

MLB debut
- August 12, 1910, for the Cleveland Naps

Last MLB appearance
- May 24, 1911, for the Cleveland Naps

MLB statistics
- Pitching Record: 0-4
- Earned run average: 6.19
- Strikeouts: 15
- Stats at Baseball Reference

Teams
- Cleveland Naps (1910–1911)

Benyew Harrison Demott (April 2, 1889 – July 5, 1963) was an American Major League Baseball (MLB) pitcher who played for two seasons. He played for the Cleveland Naps from 1910 to 1911.
