= Neal Ball =

American baseball player (1881–1957)

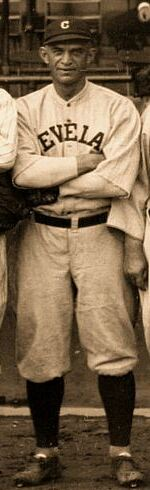
- Ball at an old-timers' game in 1921
- Shortstop
- Born: April 22, 1881; Grand Haven, Michigan, U.S.
- Died: October 15, 1957 (aged 76); Bridgeport, Connecticut, U.S.
- Batted: Right Threw: Right

MLB debut
- September 11, 1907, for the New York Highlanders

Last MLB appearance
- June 30, 1913, for the Boston Red Sox

MLB statistics
- Batting average: .251
- Home runs: 4
- Runs batted in: 151
- Stats at Baseball Reference

Teams
- New York Highlanders (1907–1909); Cleveland Naps (1909–1912); Boston Red Sox (1912–1913)

Career highlights and awards
- World Series champion (1912); Unassisted triple play (July 19, 1909)

Cornelius "Neal" Ball (April 22, 1881 – October 15, 1957) was an American professional baseball player for seven seasons in Major League Baseball (MLB). Although his primary position was shortstop, Ball played at second base, third base, and in the outfield as well. He played for the New York Highlanders, Cleveland Naps, and Boston Red Sox from 1907 to 1913. He is the first player to turn an unassisted triple play in Major League Baseball history on July 19, 1909.

Ball played minor league baseball for the Montgomery Senators of the Southern League until 1907, when he signed for the New York Highlanders. After spending less than three seasons with the organization, Ball was sold to the Cleveland Naps, where he spent the next two seasons. In the middle of the 1912 season, his contract was then purchased by the Boston Red Sox, with whom he played his last game on June 30, 1913. He died on October 15, 1957, in Bridgeport, Connecticut.

== Personal life ==
Ball was born on April 22, 1881, in Grand Haven, Michigan. After his Major League career ended, he went on to coach the Baltimore Orioles (who were a minor league team at the time). It was there that he was assigned to train Babe Ruth, who had just come out of St. Mary's Industrial School for Boys. Ball described Ruth as "the dumbest and yet the strongest player" he had ever coached. The two remained good friends after Ruth broke into the Majors and even played a friendly game of bowling against one another in 1923 (with Ball edging out Ruth, winning four out of the seven games played). Ruth held Ball in great respect, and because of their close friendship in baseball, he eventually became a fan of the New York Yankees. In the 1950s, an annual bowling tournament held at the Newfield Alleys near Bridgeport, Connecticut, was named after Ball in order to honor the city's famous inhabitant. On February 12, 1952, at the age of 71, his health severely deteriorated due to a heart ailment and he was rushed to Bridgeport Hospital, where he was placed on the danger list and visitors were prohibited from seeing him. He died on October 15, 1957 and was interred at Mountain Grove Cemetery, Bridgeport.

== Professional career ==
=== Minor leagues ===
Ball started playing organized baseball on the semi-pro team in Three Rivers, Michigan, where he played in a game against Hall of Fame Negro league star Rube Foster of the Otsego Independents during the 1902 season. He then proceeded to play for Montgomery Senators, a minor league team that competed in the Southern League. He played for the team until 1907, when he signed for the New York Highlanders. He made his major league debut for the Highlanders on September 12, 1907, at the age of 26, in a 2–0 loss against the Washington Senators.

=== New York Highlanders (1907–09) ===
During his 1908 rookie season, Ball posted a batting average of .247 and led the majors in strikeouts with 91. Defensively, he committed the most errors among all fielders in the American League with 81 and most errors by a shortstop with 80, both of which are Yankee rookie records that still stand today. However, he also set the team record for most assists by a rookie with 438 (this record has since been broken by Derek Jeter, who had 444 assists in 1996).

=== Cleveland Naps (1909–12) ===
"I am mighty glad I happened to be the one who was in the right spot and able to pull it off. Just think of the wonderful plays that Larry [Lajoie], Terry Turner and Bill Bradley have made since they have been in the major leagues, but yet they never had the chance to do what I, a utility man, a sub, did. It was just my good fortune to be in the game when such a chance was offered."

— Neal Ball reflecting on his unassisted triple play in the post-game interview

On May 18, 1909, the Cleveland Naps bought Ball’s contract for approximately $5,000 (worth $179,167 in 2025). Ball was brought in to serve as the temporary replacement for Cleveland's injured starting shortstop Terry Turner, who suffered from a recurring arm injury. In his first season with Cleveland, Ball batted .256 with one home run and 25 runs batted in. Although he was never famous for his defensive skills, he achieved baseball history when he executed the first unassisted triple play in the MLB on July 19, 1909, doing so against the Boston Red Sox at League Park. In the second inning of the game, Ball, playing shortstop, caught Amby McConnell's line drive, stepped on second base to retire Heinie Wagner, and then tagged Jake Stahl as he was advancing towards second. Because the play was unprecedented and turned so swiftly, the ballplayers on the field did not know the inning was over, and the crowd of 11,000 were unsure of how to react. Cy Young, the game's starting pitcher, was puzzled and asked Ball why he was leaving the field. Once the fans in attendance realized what had happened, they gave him an ovation, while his teammates applauded him as he returned to the dugout. In the following inning, with the crowd still cheering, he hit an inside-the-park home run to center field, which was his only home run that season. In a rare post-game interview, Ball remained humble about the feat and reminded the reporters that "anyone could have made the play". The glove that he used to make the unassisted triple play is on exhibit at the Baseball Hall of Fame. He was presented with two medals to recognize his achievement: one by the Cleveland Press and one paid for by a fund organized by the Cleveland News.

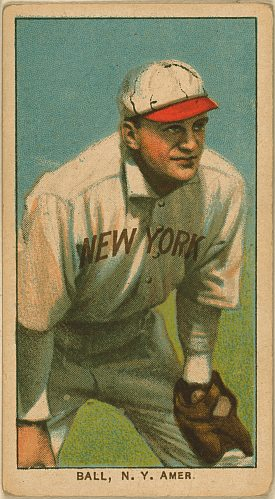
Ball on a 1909 baseball card

At the end of the 1910 season, after playing just 54 games with the team, Ball was sent down and released to the Portland Beavers. He refused to play for the minor league team and this, coupled with the underperformance of the infielders brought in to replace him, resulted in the Naps repurchasing his contract.

The 1911 season turned out to be Ball's best statistical year, with several career highs. He batted .296 with 122 hits, 9 triples, 45 RBI and 3 home runs, though he also recorded the third highest number of strikeouts in the AL with 93. Although his defense was never stellar, he executed two noted plays that season. He made a one-handed stop against the Chicago White Sox that was described as "marvelous" by The New York Times and held the Yankees (his former team) to a 3–3 draw when he, serving as the cut-off man, successfully relayed the ball thrown from right fielder Shoeless Joe Jackson to catcher Gus Fisher. In doing so, he nailed Birdie Cree (who represented the Yankees' winning run) at home plate and the game was immediately suspended due to darkness. However, in a rematch against the White Sox on May 5, 1912, Ball suffered a momentary defensive lapse that ultimately cost his team the game. In the sixth inning, he was unable to catch Shano Collins stealing second base and then inexplicably held onto the ball. This allowed Ping Bodie to advance to home plate and score the winning run.

=== Boston Red Sox (1912–13) ===
On June 25, 1912, the Boston Red Sox purchased Ball's contract from the Naps for $2,500 (equivalent to $83,405 in 2025). Ball's final major league team was ironically the one he turned his unassisted triple play against. The player who was final out of that play, Jake Stahl, became his manager and teammate. The Red Sox signed Ball with the intention of using him only as a utility player who could substitute for any injured players on the team. As a result, he rarely started for the Red Sox. The team advanced to the World Series at the end of that season, where they defeated the New York Giants 4–3. Although he struck out in his only plate appearance of the series, he still received the prize money of $4,025 ($134,282 in 2025) rewarded to players on the winning team. This prompted the Ottawa Citizen to label him "the luckiest man in baseball."

== Post-playing career ==
After playing his final major league season in 1913, Ball returned to the minors and played for several teams until 1924. Most notably, in May 1916, he was traded by the Toronto Maple Leafs to his hometown team, the Bridgeport Hustlers of the Eastern League, and became both their manager and second baseman. The Hustlers were struggling at the time, and the addition of Ball did nothing to change the team's fortunes. By July, the Hustlers were still languishing in last place and, as a result, he was dismissed from the team.
