= Spec Harkness =

American baseball player

- Pitcher
- Born: December 13, 1887; Los Angeles, California, U.S.
- Died: May 18, 1952 (aged 64); Compton, California, U.S.
- Batted: Right Threw: Right

MLB debut
- June 13, 1910, for the Cleveland Naps

Last MLB appearance
- July 5, 1911, for the Cleveland Naps

MLB statistics
- Win–loss record: 12-9
- Earned run average: 3.37
- Strikeouts: 85
- Stats at Baseball Reference

Teams
- Cleveland Naps (1910–1911)

Frederick Harvey "Spec" Harkness (December 13, 1887 – May 16, 1952) was an American professional baseball pitcher. In his nine-year career, he won 111 games, including 12 in Major League Baseball for the Cleveland Naps. Harkness was 5 feet, 11 inches tall and weighed 180 pounds.

== Career ==
Harkness was born in Los Angeles, California, in 1887. He started his professional baseball career in 1908 with the Northwestern League's Butte Miners. That season, he had a win–loss record of 22-15 and led the league in wins. He was drafted by the Pacific Coast League's Portland Beavers, and in 1909 he went 29-21, posting a 1.95 earned run average in a career-high 434 innings pitched.

Harkness joined the Cleveland Naps for the 1910 season. During his first campaign in the major leagues, he appeared in 26 games, including 16 starts, and went 10-7 with a 3.04 ERA. In 1911, his ERA rose to 4.22, and the Naps waived him in July. Harkness then returned to the Beavers. He played the next two seasons for them and had two losing records. In 1913, he went to the Venice Tigers and stayed with that team for two seasons.

Harkness played in the Northwestern League in 1915. He pitched a no-hitter on May 20 but finished the year with a record of 8-18. That was the last full season of his career, though he did pitch in four PCL games in 1921. Overall, he won 99 games and lost 94 in the minor leagues.

In 1933, Harkness was on an "Old Timers" team that barnstormed across the country, playing exhibition games. He died in Compton, California, in 1952 and was buried in Calvary Cemetery in Los Angeles.
