= Ivy Olson =

American baseball player (1885–1965)

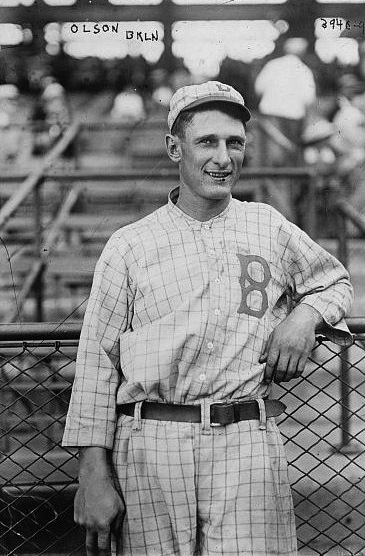
- Shortstop
- Born: October 14, 1885; Kansas City, Missouri, U.S.
- Died: September 1, 1965 (aged 79); Inglewood, California, U.S.
- Batted: Right Threw: Right

MLB debut
- April 12, 1911, for the Cleveland Naps

Last MLB appearance
- July 21, 1924, for the Brooklyn Robins

MLB statistics
- Batting average: .258
- Home runs: 13
- Runs batted in: 446
- Stats at Baseball Reference

Teams
- Cleveland Naps (1911–1914); Cincinnati Reds (1915); Brooklyn Robins (1915–1924)

Ivan Massie "Ivy" Olson (October 14, 1885 – September 1, 1965) was an American professional baseball shortstop. He played fourteen seasons in Major League Baseball (MLB) from 1911 to 1924 for the Cleveland Naps, Cincinnati Reds, and Brooklyn Robins.

His best season was in 1919 when he played in all 140 games and would lead the NL in at bats (590), plate appearances (635), hits (164), singles (140), and at bats per strikeout (49.2). In 1921, he would also lead the NL in at bats (652). He currently ranks 84th on the MLB all-time sacrifice hits list (198) and ranks 73rd on the all-time at bats per strikeout list (23). He also holds the Los Angeles Dodgers single season record for at bats per strikeout (55.1 in 1922) and is the Dodgers all-time at bats per strikeout leader (26.8).

In 14 seasons, he played in 1,574 games and had 6,111 at bats, 730 runs, 1,575 hits, 191 doubles, 69 triples, 13 home runs, 446 RBI, 156 stolen bases, 285 walks, .258 batting average, .295 on-base percentage, .318 slugging percentage, 1,943 total bases, and 198 sacrifice hits. After his playing career ended, he was a coach for the Brooklyn Dodgers and the New York Giants. He died in Inglewood, California at the age of 79.

== See also ==
- List of Major League Baseball career stolen bases leaders
