= Charlie Frank (baseball) =

American baseball player (1870–1922)

- Outfielder
- Born: May 30, 1870; Mobile, Alabama, U.S.
- Died: May 24, 1922 (aged 51); Memphis, Tennessee, U.S.
- Batted: Left Threw: Left

MLB debut
- August 18, 1893, for the St. Louis Browns

Last MLB appearance
- July 25, 1894, for the St. Louis Browns

MLB statistics
- Batting average: .298
- Home runs: 5
- Runs batted in: 59
- Stats at Baseball Reference

Teams
- St. Louis Browns (1893–1894)

Charles Frank (May 30, 1870 – May 24, 1922) was an American Major League Baseball player. He played for the St. Louis Browns in 1893–1894. He was the president and manager of various minor league baseball clubs in the Southern Association. From 1901 to 1903 he managed the Memphis Egyptians, from 1904 to 1913 the New Orleans Pelicans, and from 1916 to 1919 and 1921 the Atlanta Crackers. Frank had a scheme where he would hang baseballs in a dry refrigerator so they would not bounce anymore.

== Sources ==
- Career statistics from Baseball Reference · Retrosheet · Baseball Almanac
