= Willie Mitchell (baseball) =

American baseball player (1889–1973)

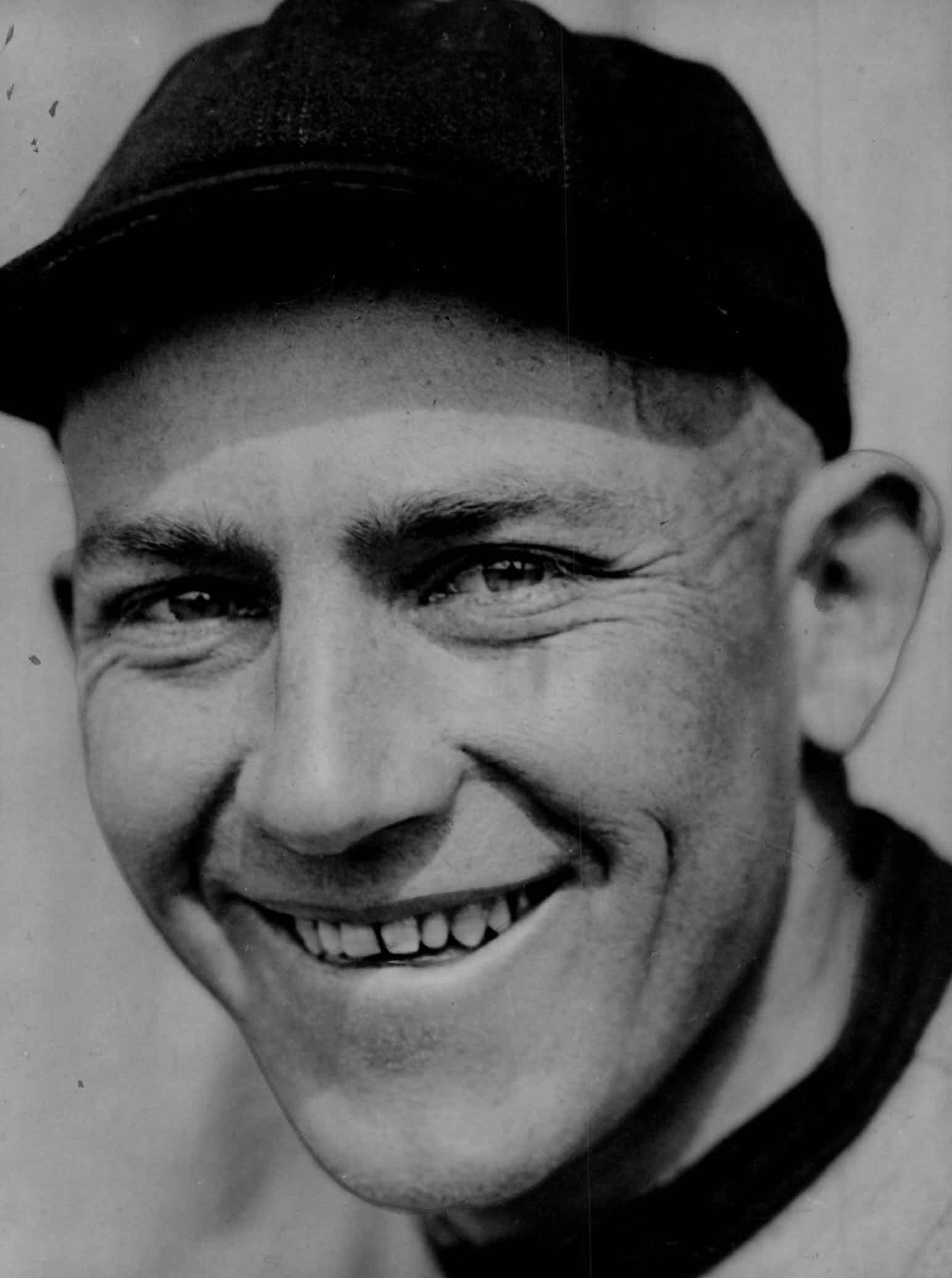
- Pitcher
- Born: December 1, 1889; Pleasant Grove, Mississippi, U.S.
- Died: November 23, 1973 (aged 83); Sardis, Mississippi, U.S.
- Batted: Right Threw: Left

MLB debut
- September 22, 1909, for the Cleveland Naps

Last MLB appearance
- May 31, 1919, for the Detroit Tigers

MLB statistics
- Win–loss record: 84–92
- Earned run average: 2.88
- Strikeouts: 921
- Stats at Baseball Reference

Teams
- Cleveland Naps/Indians (1909–1916); Detroit Tigers (1916–1919)

William Mitchell (December 1, 1889 – November 23, 1973) born in Pleasant Grove, Mississippi, was an American pitcher for the Cleveland Naps/Indians (1909-1916) and Detroit Tigers (1916-1919).

In 11 seasons, he had an 84–92 record in 276 games pitched with 93 complete games, 16 shutouts, 4 saves, 1632 innings pitched, 605 walks allowed, 921 strikeouts, 75 hit batsmen, 48 wild pitches and a 2.88 ERA. He was the first pitcher to strike out Babe Ruth which happened at Fenway Park.

He died in Sardis, Mississippi, at the age of 83.
