= George Kahler =

American baseball player (1889-1924)

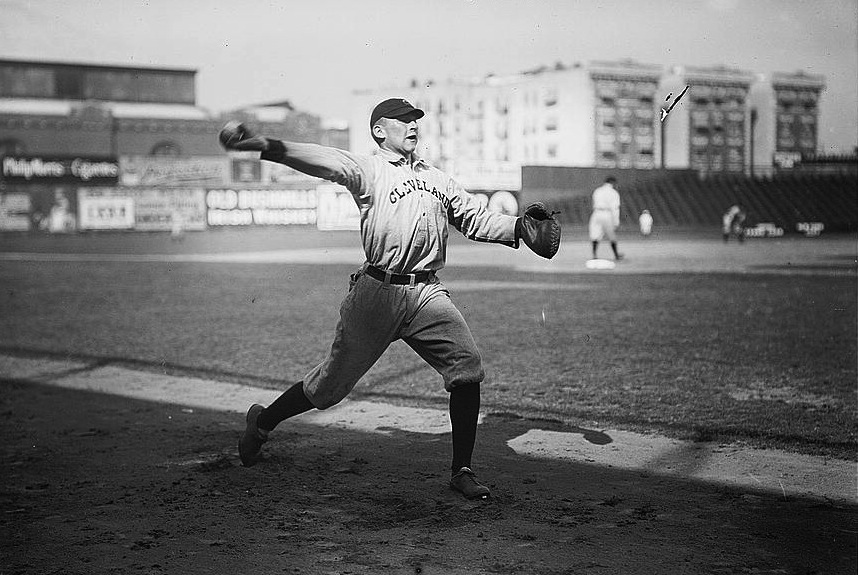
- Pitcher
- Born: September 6, 1889; Athens, Ohio, U.S.
- Died: February 7, 1924 (aged 34); Battle Creek, Michigan, U.S.
- Batted: Right Threw: Right

MLB debut
- August 13, 1910, for the Cleveland Naps

Last MLB appearance
- May 4, 1914, for the Cleveland Naps

MLB statistics
- Win–loss record: 32-43
- Earned run average: 3.17
- Strikeouts: 285
- Stats at Baseball Reference

Teams
- Cleveland Naps (1910–1914)

George Runnells "Krum" Kahler (September 6, 1889 – February 7, 1924) was an American pitcher in Major League Baseball from Athens, Ohio. He played for the Cleveland Naps from 1910 to 1914.

The spelling of Kahler's last name has varied in different newspapers, yearbooks and publications throughout his entire life. Kahler is sometimes spelled "Kaler" depending on the publication. The origin and spelling of his nickname "Krum" is unknown. It was occasionally spelled "Crum" in some articles.

== Early life ==
Kahler attended Athens High School and Ohio University of his hometown. His sister also became a faculty member in OU's English department later in her life. He grew up as a three-sport athlete, playing baseball, football and basketball. He was originally a third baseman, but eventually made the move to pitcher. In football, Kahler was a remarkable fullback. A local newspaper named him the "best OU fullback of the past twenty-five years" in the 1920s.

The student body admired Kahler for his athletic ability and good character. An article about him in the 1909 Ohio University Athena yearbook described him as talented at a young age: "At the age of 2 months he could walk. At the age of 2 years he could throw a stone from his back window hitting 4 out of 6 passersby. At the age of 4 years he never missed."

== Professional baseball career ==
Upon his graduation from OU, Kahler signed with the Lima Cigarmakers, a Class D level baseball team. In late 1909 he moved to the Columbus Senators of the American Association, making $150 per month to start. He had an outstanding 20-7 record starting for the Senators. In 1910 he was sold to the Cleveland Naps, boosting his salary to $300 per month and making him the first OU graduate to make it to the MLB.

Kahler was the second pitcher to use the emery ball, after Russ Ford. This now-illegal pitch consisted of scarring the ball to be able to achieve unnatural movement. He learned this trick while playing in the minors.

Kahler had a relatively large stature for a pitcher; he was listed as about 6 feet tall and weighed approximately 183 pounds. This was sometimes a disadvantage for him. His large stature delayed his pitching delivery, making base stealing much easier for base runners.

Kahler joined the majors during a period known as the dead-ball era, a time when pitching dominated and batting was more strategic. In 1911 he was awarded a $600 bonus for finishing the season with an even or above pitching record.

Kahler had a confrontation with Detroit Tigers outfielder Ty Cobb in the 1912 season. Kahler hit Cobb with a pitch early in the season, infuriating Cobb and causing him to plan his retaliation. On April 22, 1912, Cobb and Kahler faced off again. This time Cobb hit a grounder to first base. As Kahler ran to cover the first base bag, Cobb tried to injure him with his cleats but missed in his attempt and fell to ground. Kahler, knowing Cobb's intention, stood over him and threatened to "put him out for the rest of the season" if he did it again.

Kahler was known for his toughness on the mound. He played through a slipped tendon in his throwing arm for 14 innings against Toledo. In one game, he knocked down a line drive with his bare hand and was also hit in the ankle and shoulder by hard hit balls yet still pitched 11 innings against Minneapolis.

Hall of Fame player and manager Connie Mack described Kahler as "a man who can win against odds; one who will live through a lot of hits and come out with a victory."

From Cleveland, he was sold to Portland of the Pacific Coast League where he immediately became the highest paid player in the league. He bounced around several minor league teams, going 13-7, until he was released by the Columbus Senators on June 11, 1917.

== Post-baseball career ==
When his baseball career ended, Kahler enrolled in the American School of Osteopathy in Kirksville, Missouri. While pursuing his degree, Kahler also managed the school's baseball team and assisted in coaching the basketball and football teams. He also was the president of the Student Athletic Association, president of the Study Body of the National Osteopathic Organization, business manager of the annual student publication and class valedictorian. He graduated in 1921.

He also enrolled in the School of Osteopathy in Detroit where he met his wife. He practiced osteopathy for the remainder of his life. One of his most famous practices was his treatment of fellow baseball player Marvin Goodwin.

Though strong and athletic, Kahler still suffered from chronic nephritis and diabetes, leading to his death on February 7, 1924, in Battle Creek, Virginia, at the age of 34. He is buried in the West Union Street cemetery in Athens, Ohio.
