= Hank Butcher =

American baseball player (1886-1979)

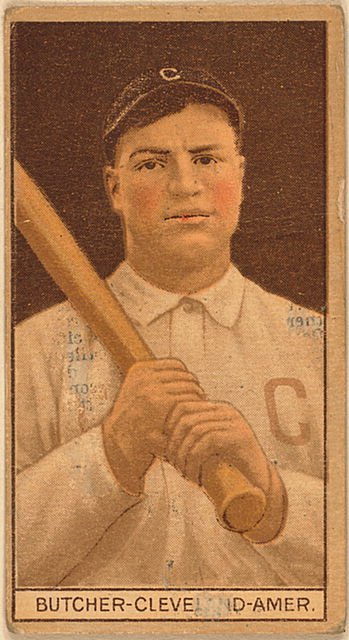
- Outfielder
- Born: July 12, 1886; Chicago, Illinois, U.S.
- Died: December 28, 1979 (aged 93); Hazel Crest, Illinois, U.S.
- Batted: Right Threw: Right

MLB debut
- July 8, 1911, for the Cleveland Naps

Last MLB appearance
- June 15, 1912, for the Cleveland Naps

MLB statistics
- Batting average: .223
- Home runs: 2
- Runs batted in: 21
- Stats at Baseball Reference

Teams
- Cleveland Naps (1911–1912)

Henry Joseph Butcher (July 12, 1886 – December 28, 1979) was an American Major League Baseball outfielder who played for two seasons. He played for the Cleveland Naps from 1911 to 1912.
