= Syd Smith (baseball) =

American baseball player (1883–1961)

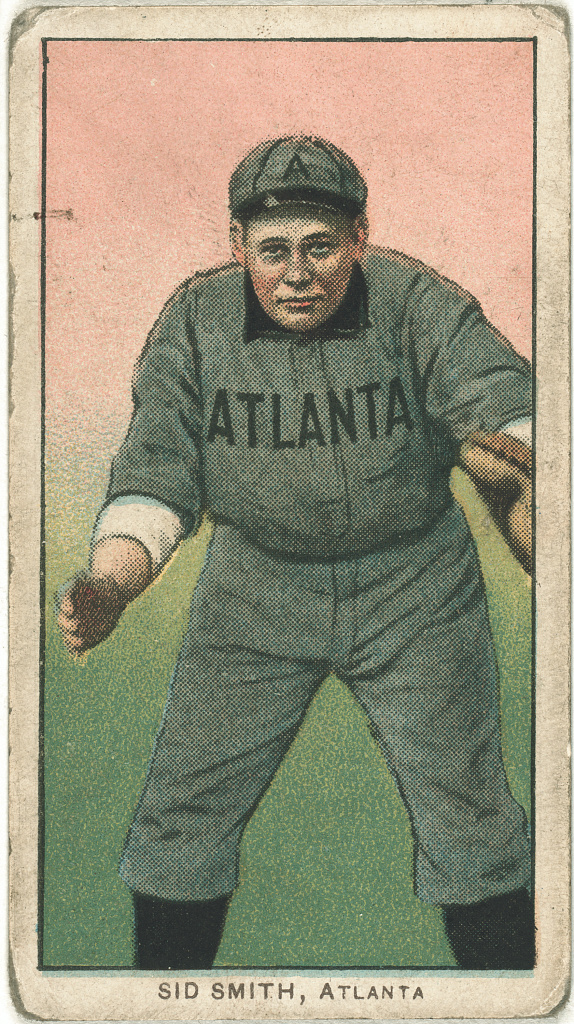
- Catcher
- Born: August 31, 1883; Smithville, South Carolina, U.S.
- Died: June 5, 1961 (aged 77); Orangeburg, South Carolina, U.S.
- Batted: Right Threw: Right

MLB debut
- April 14, 1908, for the Philadelphia Athletics

Last MLB appearance
- October 18, 1915, for the Pittsburgh Pirates

MLB statistics
- Batting average: .247
- Home runs: 2
- Runs batted in: 40
- Stats at Baseball Reference

Teams
- Philadelphia Athletics (1908); St. Louis Browns (1908); Cleveland Naps (1910–1911); Pittsburgh Pirates (1914–1915)

Syd Smith
Playing career

Baseball
- 1902–1903: South Carolina

Coaching career (HC unless noted)

Football
- 1905: The Citadel

Baseball
- 1915: South Carolina

Head coaching record
- Overall: 2–3–1 (football); 6–11 (baseball)

Sydney A. Smith (August 31, 1883 – June 5, 1961) was an American professional baseball catcher. He played in Major League Baseball (MLB) for the Philadelphia Athletics and the St. Louis Browns in 1908, the Cleveland Naps from 1910 to 1911, and the Pittsburgh Pirates from 1914 to 1915. Smith was also the first head football coach at The Citadel, serving for one season, in 1905, and compiling a record of 2–3–1.

Smith later worked for the South Carolina Employment Security Commission. He retired to Camden, South Carolina and died on June 5, 1961, at a hospital in Orangeburg, South Carolina.

== Head coaching record ==
=== Football ===
Year	Team	Overall	Conference	Standing	Bowl/playoffs
The Citadel Bulldogs (Independent) (1905)
1905	The Citadel	2–3–1			
The Citadel:		2–3–1			
Total:		2–3–1			
