= Gus Fisher (baseball) =

American baseball player (1885–1972)

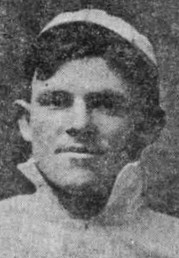
- Catcher
- Born: October 21, 1885; Pottsboro, Texas, U.S.
- Died: April 8, 1972 (aged 86); Portland, Oregon, U.S.
- Batted: Left Threw: Right

MLB debut
- April 18, 1911, for the Cleveland Naps

Last MLB appearance
- May 10, 1912, for the New York Highlanders

MLB statistics
- Batting average: .254
- Home runs: 0
- Runs batted in: 12
- Stats at Baseball Reference

Teams
- Cleveland Naps (1911); New York Highlanders (1912)

August Harris Fisher (October 21, 1885 – April 8, 1972) was an American Major League Baseball catcher who played in 1911 and 1912 with the Cleveland Naps and the New York Highlanders. He batted left and threw right-handed. Fisher had a .254 career batting average.

He was born in Pottsboro, Texas and died in Portland, Oregon.
