= Terry Turner (baseball) =

American baseball player (1881–1960)

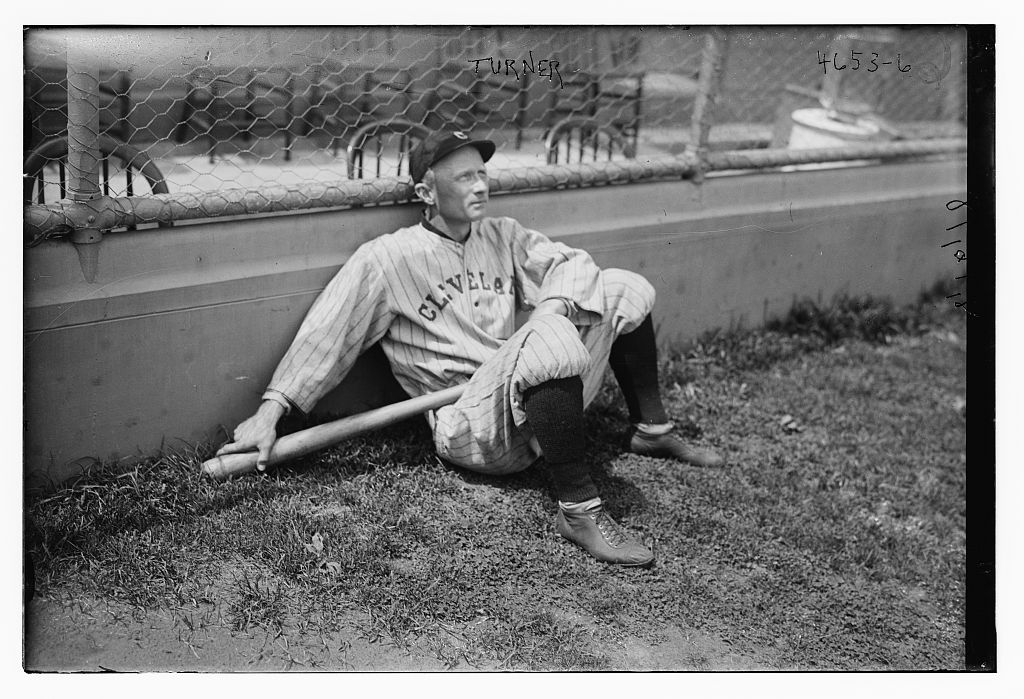
- Infielder
- Born: February 28, 1881; Sandy Lake, Pennsylvania, U.S.
- Died: July 18, 1960 (aged 79); Cleveland, Ohio, U.S.
- Batted: Right Threw: Right

MLB debut
- August 25, 1901, for the Pittsburgh Pirates

Last MLB appearance
- September 29, 1919, for the Philadelphia Athletics

MLB statistics
- Batting average: .253
- Home runs: 8
- Runs batted in: 528
- Stats at Baseball Reference

Teams
- Pittsburgh Pirates (1901); Cleveland Naps / Indians (1904–1918); Philadelphia Athletics (1919)

Terrance Lamont Turner (February 28, 1881 – July 18, 1960), nicknamed "Cotton Top", was an American professional baseball infielder. He played in Major League Baseball (MLB) from 1901 to 1919 for the Pittsburgh Pirates, Cleveland Naps / Indians, and Philadelphia Athletics.

== Biography ==
Listed at 5 ft 8 in (1.73 m), 149 lb., Turner was basically a line-drive hitter and a fearless base stealer. Because normal slides hurt his ankles, he pioneered the use of the head-first slide. As a fielder, he spent most of his playing time between shortstop and third base. He also broke up three no-hitters and spoiled a perfect game effort by Chief Bender after receiving a fourth-inning walk.

In 1904 Turner started a long tenure with Cleveland that lasted 15 years, appearing in a team-record 1,619 games, holding the record by himself for over 100 years, until it was broken by José Ramirez in April 2026. He hit a career-high .308 in 1912, and from 1906 to 1911 averaged 25.5 steals in each season, with a career-high 31 in 1910. On the field, he led the American League shortstops in fielding percentage four times. He also ranks among the top 10 Cleveland players in seven different offensive categories and still the team-mark in putouts with 4,603. For over seventy-seven years, Turner also held Cleveland's team record for the most career stolen bases with 254. His record was broken by Kenny Lofton in 1996, and has since also been surpassed by Omar Vizquel and José Ramirez, who did so in 2003 and 2025, respectively.

In a 17-season career, Turner was a .253 hitter (1499-for-5921) with eight home runs and 528 RBI in 1659 games, including 699 runs, 207 doubles, 77 triples, and 256 stolen bases.

Turner died in Cleveland, Ohio, at the age of 79. He was buried at Knollwood Cemetery in Mayfield Heights, Ohio.

In 2001, he was selected to the 100 Greatest Indians Roster, as part of the club's 100th Anniversary Celebration.

== See also ==
- List of Major League Baseball career stolen bases leaders
