= 2014 Cleveland Indians season =

2014 Cleveland Indians
- League: American League
- Division: Central
- Ballpark: Progressive Field
- City: Cleveland, Ohio
- Record: 85–77 (.525)
- Divisional place: 3rd
- Owners: Larry Dolan
- General managers: Chris Antonetti
- Managers: Terry Francona
- Television: SportsTime Ohio · WKYC (Matt Underwood, Rick Manning, Katie Witham)
- Radio: WTAM · WMMS; Cleveland Indians Radio Network (Tom Hamilton, Jim Rosenhaus)

The 2014 Cleveland Indians season was the 114th season for the franchise. They finished in third place, five games back in the American League Central.

== Offseason ==
=== Departures ===
- On November 23, 2013, relief pitcher Joe Smith signed a three-year deal with the Los Angeles Angels.
- Scott Kazmir agreed to a two-year, $24 million contract with the Oakland Athletics on December 3, 2013.

=== Arrivals ===
- On November 1, 2013, Jason Giambi re-signed to a minor league contract with an invitation to spring training.
- On November 25, 2013, the Indians signed former Texas Rangers outfielder David Murphy to a two-year contract with a club option for a third year.

== Regular season ==
The Indians opened their season on March 31, a 2–0 win over the Oakland Athletics. Their home opener, which was four days later, sold out in 15 minutes, one of the fastest sellouts in team history.

=== Opening Day starting lineup ===
1. CF Nyjer Morgan
2. 1B Nick Swisher
3. 2B Jason Kipnis
4. 3B Carlos Santana
5. LF Michael Brantley
6. DH Ryan Raburn
7. SS Asdrúbal Cabrera
8. RF David Murphy
9. C Yan Gomes

== Season standings ==
=== American League Central ===
AL Central
Team	W	L	Pct.	GB	Home	Road
Detroit Tigers	90	72	.556	—	45‍–‍36	45‍–‍36
Kansas City Royals	89	73	.549	1	42‍–‍39	47‍–‍34
Cleveland Indians	85	77	.525	5	48‍–‍33	37‍–‍44
Chicago White Sox	73	89	.451	17	40‍–‍41	33‍–‍48
Minnesota Twins	70	92	.432	20	35‍–‍46	35‍–‍46

=== American League Wild Card ===
Division leaders
Team	W	L	Pct.
Los Angeles Angels of Anaheim	98	64	.605
Baltimore Orioles	96	66	.593
Detroit Tigers	90	72	.556

Wild Card teams (Top 2 teams qualify for postseason)
Team	W	L	Pct.	GB
Kansas City Royals	89	73	.549	+1
Oakland Athletics	88	74	.543	—
Seattle Mariners	87	75	.537	1
Cleveland Indians	85	77	.525	3
New York Yankees	84	78	.519	4
Toronto Blue Jays	83	79	.512	5
Tampa Bay Rays	77	85	.475	11
Chicago White Sox	73	89	.451	15
Boston Red Sox	71	91	.438	17
Houston Astros	70	92	.432	18
Minnesota Twins	70	92	.432	18
Texas Rangers	67	95	.414	21

=== Record vs. opponents ===
2014 American League record Source: MLB Standings Grid – 2014
Team	BAL	BOS	CWS	CLE	DET	HOU	KC	LAA	MIN	NYY	OAK	SEA	TB	TEX	TOR	NL
Baltimore	—	11–8	5–1	3–4	1–5	4–3	3–4	4–2	4–3	13–6	2–4	5–2	12–7	6–1	11–8	12–8
Boston	8–11	—	4–3	2–5	1–5	4–3	6–1	2–5	4–2	7–12	3–4	1–5	9–10	4–2	7–12	9–11
Chicago	1–5	3–4	—	9–10	9–10	3–3	6–13	1–5	9–10	2–5	4–3	3–4	5–2	2–4	5–2	11–9
Cleveland	4–3	5–2	10–9	—	8–11	5–2	10–9	2–5	11–8	4–3	2–4	2–4	4–2	6–1	2–4	10–10
Detroit	5–1	5–1	10–9	11–8	—	4–3	13–6	3–4	9–10	3–4	5–2	2–4	3–4	4–3	1–5	12–8
Houston	3–4	3–4	3–3	2–5	3–4	—	3–3	7–12	3–3	4–2	8–11	9–10	2–5	11–8	4–3	5–15
Kansas City	4–3	1–6	13–6	9–10	6–13	3–3	—	3–3	11–8	4–3	5–2	2–5	4–2	5–1	4–3	15–5
Los Angeles	2–4	5–2	5–1	5–2	4–3	12–7	3–3	—	7–0	2–4	10–9	7–12	5–2	14–5	5–2	12–8
Minnesota	3–4	2–4	10–9	8–11	10–9	3–3	8–11	0–7	—	3–4	1–6	5–2	2–4	2–5	4–2	9–11
New York	6–13	12–7	5–2	3–4	4–3	2–4	3–4	4–2	4–3	—	2–4	3–3	8–11	4–3	11–8	13–7
Oakland	4–2	4–3	3–4	4–2	2–5	11–8	2–5	9–10	6–1	4–2	—	9–10	4–2	9–10	4–3	13–7
Seattle	2–5	5–1	4–3	4–2	4–2	10–9	5–2	12–7	2–5	3–3	10–9	—	4–3	9–10	4–3	9–11
Tampa Bay	7–12	10–9	2–5	2–4	4–3	5–2	2–4	2–5	4–2	11–8	2–4	3–4	—	5–2	8–11	10–10
Texas	1–6	2–4	4–2	1–6	3–4	8–11	1–5	5–14	5–2	3–4	10–9	10–9	2–5	—	2–4	10–10
Toronto	8–11	12–7	2–5	4–2	5–1	3–4	3–4	2–5	2–4	8–11	3–4	3–4	11–8	4–2	—	13–7

=== Detailed records ===
(updated through September 28)

American League
Opponent	Home	Away	Total	Pct.	Runs scored	Runs allowed
AL East
Baltimore Orioles	2-1	2-2	4-3	.571	32	24
Boston Red Sox	3-0	2-2	5-2	.714	26	28
New York Yankees	2-2	2-1	4-3	.571	34	27
Tampa Bay Rays	2-1	2-1	4-2	.667	21	19
Toronto Blue Jays	1-2	1-2	2-4	.333	29	25
	10-6	9-8	19-14	.576	142	123
AL Central
Chicago White Sox	7-2	3-7	10-9	.526	78	71
Cleveland Indians	-	-	-	-	-	-
Detroit Tigers	4-6	4-5	8-11	.421	87	103
Kansas City Royals	6-4	4-5	10-9	.526	70	73
Minnesota Twins	6-4	5-4	11-8	.579	90	63
	23-16	16-21	39-37	.513	325	309
AL West
Houston Astros	2-1	3-1	5-2	.714	16	14
Los Angeles Angels	2-2	0-3	2-5	.286	23	46
Oakland Athletics	0-3	2-1	2-4	.333	15	40
Seattle Mariners	1-2	1-2	2-4	.333	16	17
Texas Rangers	3-0	3-1	6-1	.857	50	23
	8-8	9-8	17-16	.515	120	139

National League
Opponent	Home	Away	Total	Pct.	Runs scored	Runs allowed
Arizona Diamondbacks	1-1	1-1	2-2	.500	17	13
Cincinnati Reds	1-1	0-2	1-3	.250	12	22
Colorado Rockies	3-0	—	3-0	1.000	18	12
Los Angeles Dodgers	—	2-1	2-1	.667	15	8
San Diego Padres	2-1	—	2-1	.667	11	8
San Francisco Giants	—	0-3	0-3	.000	5	14
	7-3	3-7	10-10	.500	78	77

== Game log ==
Legend
Indians Win	Indians Loss	Game postponed

2014 Game Log
March/April: 11-17 (Home: 7-6, Road: 4-11)

#	Date	Opponent	Score	Win	Loss	Save	Attendance	Record
1	March 31	@ Athletics	2-0	Allen (1–0)	Johnson (0–1)	Axford (1)	36,067	1–0
	April 1	@ Athletics	Postponed (rain). Makeup: April 2 (Game 1)					
2	April 2	@ Athletics	6-1	Kazmir (1–0)	Kluber (0–1)		15,134	1-1
3	April 2	@ Athletics	6-4	Allen (2–0)	Johnson (0–2)	Axford (2)	12,198	2–1
4	April 4	Twins	7-2	Outman (1–0)	Pelfrey (0–1)		41,274	3–1
5	April 5	Twins	7-3	Gibson (1–0)	Carrasco (0–1)		14,153	3–2
6	April 6	Twins	10-7	Swarzak (1–0)	Wood (0–1)	Perkins (2)	13,104	3-3
	April 7	Padres	Postponed (rain). Makeup: April 9 (Game 2)					
7	April 8	Padres	8-6	Kluber (1-1)	Ross (0–2)	Axford (3)		4–3
8	April 9	Padres	2-0	McAllister (1–0)	Stults (0–2)	Axford (4)	9,029	5–3
9	April 9	Padres	2-1	Erlin (1–0)	Bauer (0–1)	Street (3)	9,930	5–4
10	April 10	@ White Sox	7-3	Danks (1–0)	Salazar (0–1)		11,116	5-5
11	April 11	@ White Sox	9-6	Sale (3–0)	Carrasco (0–2)		13,605	5–6
12	April 12	@ White Sox	12-6	Outman (2–0)	Belisario (1-1)		27,332	6-6
13	April 13	@ White Sox	4-3	Lindstrom (1-1)	Axford (0–1)		14,281	6–7
	April 15	@ Tigers	Postponed ("cold"). Makeup: July 19 (Game 1)					
14	April 16	@ Tigers	3-2	McAllister (2–0)	Sánchez (0–1)	Axford (5)	23,811	7-7
15	April 17	@ Tigers	7-5	Verlander (2–1)	Salazar (0–2)	Nathan (2)	25,990	7–8
16	April 18	Blue Jays	3-2	Delabar (1–0)	Rzepczynski (0–1)	Santos (5)	16,335	7–9
17	April 19	Blue Jays	5-0	Buehrle (4–0)	Kluber (1–2)		15,188	7–10
18	April 20	Blue Jays	6-4	Outman (3–0)	Loup (1-1)	Axford (6)	11,716	8–10
19	April 21	Royals	4-3	McAllister (3–0)	Guthrie (2–1)	Axford (7)	10,789	9–10
20	April 22	Royals	8-2	Shields (2-2)	Salazar (0–3)		8,848	9–11
21	April 23	Royals	5-3	Shaw (1–0)	Herrera (0–1)	Axford (8)	9,311	10–11
22	April 24	Royals	5-1	Kluber (2-2)	Chen (1–2)		10,440	11-11
23	April 25	@ Giants	5-1	Hudson (3–1)	Carrasco (0–3)		41,296	11–12
24	April 26	@ Giants	5-3	Gutierrez (1-1)	McAllister (3–1)	Romo (6)	42,088	11–13
25	April 27	@ Giants	4-1	Romo (2–0)	Allen (2–1)		41,530	11–14
26	April 28	@ Angels	6-3	Salas (2–0)	Masterson (0–1)	Smith (1)	37,654	11–15
27	April 29	@ Angels	6-4	Weaver (2-2)	Kluber (2–3)	Smith (2)	35,131	11–16
28	April 30	@ Angels	7-1	Wilson (4–2)	McAllister (3–2)		33,334	11–17

May: 15-13 (Home: 10-5, Road: 5-8)

#	Date	Opponent	Score	Win	Loss	Save	Attendance	Record
29	May 2	White Sox	12-5	Salazar (1–3)	Danks (2–2)		15,518	12–17
30	May 3	White Sox	2-0	Masterson (1-1)	Carroll (1-1)	Axford (9)	15.834	13–17
31	May 4	White Sox	4-3	Webb (2–0)	Axford (0–2)	Lindstrom (4)	13,455	13–18
32	May 5	Twins	1-0 (10)	Thielbar (2–0)	Axford (0–3)	Perkins (8)	9,037	13–19
33	May 6	Twins	4-2	Tomlin (1–0)	Deduno (0–2)	Shaw (1)	9,621	14–19
34	May 7	Twins	4-3	Axford (1–3)	Fien (3–1)		10,742	15–19
35	May 8	Twins	9-4	Masterson (2–1)	Correia (1–4)		13,095	16–19
36	May 9	@ Rays	6-3	Kluber (3-3)	Peralta (1–3)	Allen (1)	17,541	17–19
37	May 10	@ Rays	7-1	Bédard (2–1)	McAllister (3-3)		29,212	17–20
38	May 11	@ Rays	6-5	Tomlin (2–0)	Archer (2-2)	Shaw (2)	23,679	18–20
39	May 13	@ Blue Jays	5-4	Dickey (4–3)	Masterson (2-2)	Janssen (1)	13,673	18–21
40	May 14	@ Blue Jays	15-4	Kluber (4–3)	McGowan (2-2)		14,068	19–21
41	May 15	@ Blue Jays	4-2	Happ (2–1)	Salazar (1–4)	Janssen (2)	17,364	19–22
42	May 16	Athletics	11-1	Gray (5–1)	McAllister (3–4)		21,389	19–23
43	May 17	Athletics	6-2	Otero (4–0)	Tomlin (2–1)		18,358	19–24
44	May 18	Athletics	13-3	Chavez (4–1)	Masterson (2–3)		14,872	19–25
45	May 19	Tigers	5-4 (10)	Atchison (1–0)	Alburquerque (1-1)		12,709	20–25
46	May 20	Tigers	6-2	Bauer (1-1)	Verlander (5–3)		13,924	21–25
47	May 21	Tigers	11-10 (13)	Tomlin (3–1)	Coke (0–1)		19,228	22–25
48	May 22	@ Orioles	8-7 (13)	Outman (4–0)	Patton (0–1)	Atchison (1)	18,849	23–25
49	May 23	@ Orioles	8-4	Norris (3–4)	House (0–1)		39,602	23–26
50	May 24	@ Orioles	9-0	Kluber (5–3)	Jiménez (2–6)		36,873	24–26
51	May 25	@ Orioles	4-2	González (3-3)	Bauer (1–2)	Britton (2)	37,649	24–27
52	May 26	@ White Sox	6-2	Quintana (3–4)	Tomlin (3–2)	Downs (1)	17,075	24–28
53	May 27	@ White Sox	2-1	Carroll (2–3)	Masterson (2–4)	Belisario (3)	14,237	24–29
54	May 28	@ White Sox	3-2	Belisario (3-3)	Shaw (1-1)		14,228	24–30
55	May 30	Rockies	2-5	Kluber (6–3)	Nicasio (5–3)	Allen (2)	25,066	25–30
56	May 31	Rockies	6-7	Shaw (2–1)	Brothers (2–3)	Allen (3)	20,174	26–30

June: 13-13 (Home: 6-4, Road: 7-9)

#	Date	Opponent	Score	Win	Loss	Save	Attendance	Record
57	June 1	Rockies	6-4	Atchison (2–0)	Ottavino (0–2)		16,682	27–30
58	June 2	Red Sox	3-2	Masterson (3–4)	Lackey (6–4)	Allen (4)	14,078	28–30
59	June 3	Red Sox	5-3	Hagadone (1–0)	Peavy (1–3)	Allen (5)	18,738	29–30
60	June 4	Red Sox	7-4 (12)	Carrasco (1–3)	Mujica (2-2)		20,209	30-30
61	June 6	@ Rangers	6-4	Darvish (6–2)	Rzepczynski (0–2)	Soria (13)	38,348	30–31
62	June 7	@ Rangers	8-3	Tomlin (4–2)	Tepesch (2-2)		34,633	31-31
63	June 8	@ Rangers	3-2	Masterson (4-4)	Saunders (0–2)	Allen (6)	34,613	32–31
64	June 9	@ Rangers	17-7	Atchison (3–0)	Martinez (1–3)		29,362	33–31
65	June 10	@ Royals	9-5	Vargas (6–2)	Kluber (6–4)	Crow (1)	25,540	33–32
66	June 11	@ Royals	4-1	Ventura (4–5)	Bauer (1–3)	Holland (19)	19,938	33-33
67	June 12	@ Red Sox	5-2	Lester (7-7)	Tomlin (4–3)	Uehara (14)	37,750	33–34
68	June 13	@ Red Sox	10-3	Lackey (8–4)	Masterson (4–5)		35,772	33–35
69	June 14	@ Red Sox	3-2	Axford (2–3)	Breslow (2-2)	Allen (7)	37,181	34–35
70	June 15	@ Red Sox	3-2 (11)	Allen (3–1)	Tazawa (1-1)		37,356	35-35
71	June 16	Angels	4-3	Bauer (2–3)	Weaver (7–6)	Carrasco (1)	14,716	36–35
72	June 17	Angels	9-3	Shoemaker (4–1)	Tomlin (4-4)		14,639	36-36
--	June 18	Angels	Postponed (rain). Makeup: September 8					
73	June 19	Angels	5-3 (10)	Crockett (1–0)	Bedrosian (0–1)		20,361	37–36
74	June 20	Tigers	6-4	Porcello (9–4)	Kluber (6–5)	Nathan (15)	33,545	37-37
75	June 21	Tigers	5-4 (10)	Nathan (4–2)	Allen (3–2)	Coke (1)	40,712	37–38
76	June 22	Tigers	10-4	Scherzer (9–3)	Tomlin (4–5)		26,023	37–39
77	June 24	@ Diamondbacks	9-8 (14)	Collmenter (6–4)	Lowe (0–1)		20,945	37–40
78	June 25	@ Diamondbacks	6-1	Kluber (7–5)	Anderson (5–3)		21,269	38–40
79	June 27	@ Mariners	3-2	Young (7–4)	Bauer (2–4)	Rodney (22)	28,084	38–41
80	June 28	@ Mariners	5-0	Tomlin (5-5)	Elias (7–6)		23,012	39–41
81	June 29	@ Mariners	3-0	Hernández (10–2)	House (0–2)	Rodney (23)	26,171	39–42
82	June 30	@ Dodgers	1-0	Haren (8–4)	Kluber (7–6)	Jansen (25)	45,627	39–43

July: 14-12 (Home: 7-6, Road: 7-6)

#	Date	Opponent	Score	Win	Loss	Save	Attendance	Record
83	July 1	@ Dodgers	10-3	Crockett (2–0)	Beckett (5-5)		46,300	40–43
84	July 2	@ Dodgers	5-4	Shaw (3–1)	Wilson (1–3)	Allen (8)	50,199	41–43
85	July 4	Royals	7-1	Ventura (6–7)	Tomlin (5–6)		39,020	41–44
86	July 5	Royals	7-3	House (1–2)	Guthrie (5–7)		24,481	42–44
87	July 6	Royals	4-1	Kluber (8–6)	Duffy (5–8)	Allen (9)	16,991	43–44
88	July 7	Yankees	5-3	Greene (1–0)	Masterson (4–6)	Betances (1)	21,558	43–45
89	July 8	Yankees	5-3	Bauer (3–4)	Tanaka (12–4)	Allen (10)	23,384	44–45
90	July 9	Yankees	5-4 (14)	Whitley (4–2)	Pestano (0–1)	Robertson (22)	21,727	44–46
91	July 10	Yankees	9-3	Carrasco (2–3)	Thornton (0–3)		28,334	45–46
92	July 11	White Sox	7-4	Kluber (9–6)	Noesí (3–7)	Allen (11)	24,652	46-46
93	July 12	White Sox	6-2	Carroll (4–5)	McAllister (3–5)		23,837	46–47
94	July 13	White Sox	3-2	Shaw (4–1)	Guerra (0–2)	Allen (12)	18,070	47-47
95	July 18	@ Tigers	9-3	Bauer (4-4)	Sánchez (6–4)		42,255	48–47
96	July 19	@ Tigers	6-2	Kluber (10–6)	VerHagen (0–1)		38,109	49–47
97	July 19	@ Tigers	5-2	Carrasco (3-3)	Nathan (4–3)	Allen (13)	42,044	50–47
98	July 20	@ Tigers	5-1	Smyly (6–8)	Tomlin (5–7)		41,736	50–48
99	July 21	@ Twins	4-3	Fien (5–4)	Shaw (4–2)	Perkins (23)	25,109	50–49
100	July 22	@ Twins	8-2	Salazar (2–4)	Pino (1–3)		28,291	51–49
101	July 23	@ Twins	3-1	Swarzak (2–0)	Bauer (4–5)	Perkins (24)	34,608	51–50
102	July 24	@ Royals	2-1 (14)	Crow (5–1)	Rzepczynski (0–3)		22,120	51-51
103	July 25	@ Royals	6-4	Herrera (2-2)	Carrasco (3–4)	Crow (2)	33,460	51–52
104	July 26	@ Royals	7-5	Guthrie (6–9)	McAllister (3–6)	Holland (27)	29,567	51–53
105	July 27	@ Royals	10-3	Salazar (3–4)	Chen (2–3)		23,409	52–53
106	July 29	Mariners	5-2	Iwakuma (9–5)	Bauer (4–6)	Rodney (29)	15,713	52–54
107	July 30	Mariners	2-0	Kluber (11–6)	Hernández (11–3)		14,863	53–54
108	July 31	Mariners	6-5	Beimel (3–1)	Shaw (4–3)	Rodney (30)	16,336	53–55

August: 18-9 (Home: 9-4, Road: 9-5)

#	Date	Opponent	Score	Win	Loss	Save	Attendance	Record
109	August 1	Rangers	12-2	Salazar (4-4)	Williams (2–5)		27,009	54–55
110	August 2	Rangers	2-0	Atchison (4–0)	Mikolas (1–4)	Allen (14)	28,285	55-55
111	August 3	Rangers	4-3 (12)	Atchison (5–0)	Klein (0–1)		18,422	56–55
112	August 4	Reds	7-1	Kluber (12–6)	Simón (12–7)	Axford (10)	18,696	57–55
113	August 5	Reds	9-2	Cueto (13–6)	Tomlin (5–8)		22,068	57–56
114	August 6	@ Reds	8-3	Latos (4–3)	Salazar (4–5)		33,863	57-57
115	August 7	@ Reds	4-0	Bailey (9–5)	House (1–3)		31,862	57–58
116	August 8	@ Yankees	10-6	Rogers (2–0)	Bauer (4–7)		43,972	57–59
117	August 9	@ Yankees	3-0	Kluber (13–6)	McCarthy (7–11)	Allen (15)	47,376	58–59
118	August 10	@ Yankees	4-1	Carrasco (4-4)	Kuroda (7–8)		46,152	59-59
–	August 12	Diamondbacks	Postponed (rain). Makeup: August 13					
119	August 13	Diamondbacks	3-2	Allen (4–2)	Delgado (1–3)		—	60–59
120	August 13	Diamondbacks	1-0 (12)	Delgado (2–3)	Lee (0–1)	Reed (28)	17,562	60-60
121	August 15	Orioles	2-1 (11)	Atchison (6–0)	Matusz (2–3)		27,845	61–60
122	August 16	Orioles	6-0	Carrasco (5–4)	Jiménez (4–9)		27,881	62–60
123	August 17	Orioles	4-1	Gausman (7–4)	Salazar (4–6)	Britton (26)	22,564	62–61
124	August 19	@ Twins	7-5	Crockett (3–0)	Duensing (3-3)	Allen (16)	26,358	63–61
125	August 20	@ Twins	5-0	House (2–3)	Nolasco (5–9)		28,943	64–61
126	August 21	@ Twins	4-1	Hughes (14–8)	Kluber (13–7)	Perkins (32)	28,033	64–62
127	August 22	Astros	5-1	Sipp (4–2)	Allen (4–3)		18,743	64–63
128	August 23	Astros	3-2	Allen (5–3)	Buchanan (1–3)		20,785	65–63
129	August 24	Astros	3-1	Bauer (5–7)	Oberholtzer (4–9)	Allen (17)	17,123	66–63
130	August 26	@ White Sox	8-6 (10)	Shaw (5–3)	Petricka (0–4)		12,462	67–63
131	August 27	@ White Sox	3-2	Noesí (8–9)	Kluber (13–8)	Putnam (4)	11,976	67–64
132	August 28	@ White Sox	3-2	Carrasco (6–4)	Danks (9-9)	Allen (18)	13,016	68–64
133	August 29	@ Royals	6-1	Salazar (5–6)	Vargas (10–7)		31,341	69–64
134	August 30	@ Royals	3-2 (11)	Tomlin (6–8)	Downs (0–4)		35,089	70–64
135	August 31	@ Royals	4-2 (10)	Allen (6–3)	Holland (1–3)	Atchison (2)	39,009	71–64

September: 14-13 (Home: 9-8, Road: 5-5)

#	Date	Opponent	Score	Win	Loss	Save	Attendance	Record
136	September 1	Tigers	12-1	Price (13–10)	Kluber (13–9)		23,296	71–65
137	September 2	Tigers	4-2	Coke (3–2)	Allen (6–4)	Nathan (29)	9,990	71–66
138	September 3	Tigers	7-0	Salazar (6-6)	Verlander (12-12)		11,739	72–66
139	September 4	Tigers	11-4 (11)	Coke (4–2)	Tomlin (6–9)		11,935	72–67
140	September 5	White Sox	2-1 (10)	Lee (1-1)	Cleto (0–1)		15,531	73–67
141	September 6	White Sox	3-1	Kluber (14–9)	Putnam (4–3)		17,367	74–67
142	September 7	White Sox	2-0	Carrasco (7–4)	Carroll (5–10)	Allen (19)	17,957	75–67
143	September 8	Angels	12-3	Weaver (16–8)	Salazar (6–7)		15,116	75–68
144	September 9	Twins	4-3	May (2–4)	Bauer (5–8)	Burton (2)	9,489	75–69
—	September 10	Twins	Postponed (rain). Makeup: September 11					
145	September 11	Twins	8-2	Kluber (15–9)	Gibson (11-11)		—	76–69
146	September 11	Twins	2-0	House (3-3)	Nolasco (5–11)	Allen (20)	12,637	77–69
147	September 12	@ Tigers	7-2	Price (14–11)	Carrasco (7–5)		38,341	77–70
148	September 13	@ Tigers	5-4	Chamberlain (2–5)	Shaw (5–4)	Nathan (31)	41,190	77–71
149	September 14	@ Tigers	6-4	Coke (5–2)	Shaw (5-5)	Nathan (32)	39,395	77–72
150	September 15	@ Astros	3-1	McHugh (10–9)	McAllister (3–7)	Qualls (18)	17,403	77–73
151	September 16	@ Astros	4-2	Kluber (16–9)	Tropeano (1-1)	Allen (21)	18,381	78–73
152	September 17	@ Astros	2-0	Carrasco (8–5)	Oberholtzer (5–12)		18,474	79–73
153	September 18	@ Astros	2-1 (13)	Crockett (4–0)	Deduno (2–6)	Allen (22)	16,417	80–73
154	September 19	@ Twins	5-4 (10)	Burton (3–5)	Crockett (4–1)		28,400	80–74
155	September 20	@ Twins	7-3	House (4–3)	May (3–5)	Rzepczynski (1)	28,316	81–74
156	September 21	@ Twins	7-2	Kluber (17–9)	Swarzak (3–2)		24,451	82–74
157	September 22	Royals	2-0	Duffy (9–11)	Carrasco (8–6)	Holland (44)	10,458	82–75
158	September 23	Royals	7-1	Ventura (14–10)	Salazar (6–8)		11,735	82–76
159	September 24	Royals	6-4	McAllister (4–7)	Finnegan (0–1)	Allen (23)	13,796	83–76
160	September 26	Rays	1-0	Kluber (18–9)	Archer (10–9)	Allen (24)	23,131	84–76
161	September 27	Rays	2-0	Colomé (2–0)	Carrasco (8–7)	McGee (19)	33,025	84–77
162	September 28	Rays	7-2	House (5–3)	Cobb (10–9)		21,400	85–77

== Player stats ==
=== Batting ===
Note: G = Games played; AB = At bats; R = Runs scored; H = Hits; 2B = Doubles; 3B = Triples; HR = Home runs; RBI = Runs batted in; AVG = Batting average; SB = Stolen bases

Player	G	AB	R	H	2B	3B	HR	RBI	AVG	SB
Jesus Aguilar	19	33	2	4	0	0	0	3	.121	0
Cody Allen	5	0	0	0	0	0	0	0	—	0
Scott Atchison	7	0	0	0	0	0	0	0	—	0
Mike Avilés	113	344	38	85	16	1	5	39	.247	14
John Axford	2	0	0	0	0	0	0	0	—	0
Trevor Bauer	1	2	0	0	0	0	0	0	.000	0
Michael Bourn	106	444	57	114	17	10	3	28	.257	10
Michael Brantley	156	611	94	200	45	2	20	97	.327	23
Asdrúbal Cabrera	97	378	54	93	22	2	9	40	.246	7
Carlos Carrasco	2	2	0	0	0	0	0	0	.000	0
Lonnie Chisenhall	142	478	62	134	29	1	13	59	.280	3
Kyle Crockett	4	0	0	0	0	0	0	0	—	0
Chris Dickerson	41	98	12	22	4	0	2	6	.224	3
Jason Giambi	26	60	3	8	2	0	2	5	.133	0
Chris Gimenez	8	9	0	0	0	0	0	0	.000	0
Yan Gomes	135	485	61	135	25	3	21	74	.278	0
Tyler Holt	36	71	4	19	2	0	0	2	.268	2
Elliot Johnson	7	19	1	2	2	0	0	0	.105	0
Jason Kipnis	129	500	61	120	25	1	6	41	.240	22
Corey Kluber	4	5	0	1	0	0	0	0	.200	0
George Kottaras	10	21	4	6	0	0	3	4	.286	0
C.C. Lee	3	0	0	0	0	0	0	0	—	0
Mark Lowe	1	0	0	0	0	0	0	0	—	0
Justin Masterson	2	3	0	0	0	0	0	0	.000	0
Zach McAllister	1	2	0	1	0	0	0	0	.500	0
Nyjer Morgan	15	41	8	14	1	0	1	6	.341	3
David Murphy	129	416	40	109	25	1	8	58	.262	2
Josh Outman	2	0	0	0	0	0	0	0	—	0
Roberto Perez	29	85	10	23	5	0	1	4	.271	0
Vinnie Pestano	3	0	0	0	0	0	0	0	—	0
Ryan Raburn	74	195	18	39	7	0	4	22	.200	0
José Ramírez	68	237	27	61	10	2	2	17	.262	10
Mark Rzepczynski	5	0	0	0	0	0	0	0	—	0
Danny Salazar	2	3	0	0	0	0	0	0	.000	0
Carlos Santana	152	541	68	125	25	0	27	85	.231	5
Justin Sellers	17	16	1	3	0	0	0	0	.188	0
Bryan Shaw	4	0	0	0	0	0	0	0	—	0
J. B. Shuck	15	23	2	2	0	0	0	0	.087	0
Nick Swisher	97	360	33	75	20	0	8	42	.208	0
Josh Tomlin	1	0	0	0	0	0	0	0	—	0
Zach Walters	30	88	9	15	2	0	7	12	.170	0
Team totals	162	5575	669	1411	284	23	142	644	.253	104

=== Pitching ===
Note: W = Wins; L = Losses; ERA = Earned run average; G = Games pitched; GS = Games started; SV = Saves; IP = Innings pitched; H = Hits allowed; R = Runs allowed; ER = Earned runs allowed; BB = Walks allowed; K = Strikeouts

Player	W	L	ERA	G	GS	SV	IP	H	R	ER	BB	K
Austin Adams	0	0	9.00	6	0	0	7.0	9	7	7	1	4
Cody Allen	6	4	2.07	76	0	24	69.2	48	21	16	26	91
Scott Atchison	6	0	2.75	70	0	2	72.0	60	24	22	14	49
John Axford	2	3	3.92	49	0	10	43.2	34	21	19	30	51
Trevor Bauer	5	8	4.18	26	26	0	153.0	151	76	71	60	143
Carlos Carrasco	8	7	2.55	40	14	1	134.0	103	40	38	29	140
Kyle Crockett	4	1	1.80	44	0	0	30.0	26	6	6	8	28
Nick Hagadone	1	0	2.70	35	0	0	23.1	18	7	7	6	27
T.J. House	5	3	3.35	19	18	0	102.0	113	41	38	22	80
Corey Kluber	18	9	2.44	34	34	0	235.2	207	72	64	51	269
C.C. Lee	1	1	4.50	37	0	0	28.0	30	15	14	12	26
Mark Lowe	0	1	3.86	7	0	0	7.0	10	7	3	6	6
Justin Masterson	4	6	5.51	19	19	0	98.0	106	66	60	56	93
Zach McAllister	4	7	5.23	22	15	0	86.0	96	54	50	28	74
Josh Outman	4	0	3.28	31	0	0	24.2	22	10	9	16	24
Vinnie Pestano	0	1	5.00	13	0	0	9.0	13	7	5	1	13
Bryan Price	0	0	20.25	3	0	0	2.2	8	6	6	1	1
Marc Rzepczynski	0	3	2.74	73	0	0	46.0	42	19	14	19	46
Danny Salazar	6	8	4.25	20	20	0	110.0	117	57	52	35	120
Bryan Shaw	5	5	2.59	80	0	2	76.1	61	26	22	22	64
Josh Tomlin	6	9	4.76	25	16	0	104.0	120	66	55	14	94
Blake Wood	0	1	7.11	7	0	0	6.1	4	5	5	7	7
Team totals	85	77	3.56	162	162	40	1468.1	1398	653	581	464	1450

=== Roster ===
2014 Cleveland Indians
Roster
Pitchers: 49 Austin Adams; 37 Cody Allen; 48 Scott Atchison; 44 John Axford; 47 Trevor Bauer; 59 Carlos Carrasco; 57 Kyle Crockett; 50 Nick Hagadone; 58 T. J. House; 28 Corey Kluber; 20 C. C. Lee; 54 Mark Lowe; 63 Justin Masterson; 34 Zach McAllister; 88 Josh Outman; 52 Vinnie Pestano; 56 Bryan Price; 35 Mark Rzepczynski; 31 Danny Salazar; 27 Bryan Shaw; 43 Josh Tomlin; 49 Blake Wood	Catchers: 10 Yan Gomes; 53 George Kottaras; 55 Roberto Pérez; Infielders: 36 Jesús Aguilar; 4 Mike Avilés; 13 Asdrúbal Cabrera; 8 Lonnie Chisenhall; 53 Chris Gimenez; 22 Jason Kipnis; 11 José Ramírez; 41 Carlos Santana; 1 Justin Sellers; 33 Nick Swisher	Outfielders: 24 Michael Bourn; 23 Michael Brantley; 38 Chris Dickerson; 62 Tyler Holt; 30 Elliot Johnson; 6 Nyjer Morgan; 7 David Murphy; 9 Ryan Raburn; 39 J. B. Shuck; 6 Zach Walters; Other batters: 25,72 Jason Giambi	Manager: 17 Terry Francona; Coaches: 15 Sandy Alomar Jr. (first base); -- Tim Belcher (special assistant); -- Jason Bere (special assistant); 32 Mickey Callaway (pitching); 64 Armando Camacaro (bullpen catcher); 45 Kevin Cash (bullpen); -- Travis Fryman (special assistant); 2 Brad Mills (bench); 82 Ricky Pacione (bullpen catcher); 60 Matt Quatraro (assistant hitting); -- Edwin Rodríguez (special assistant); 16 Mike Sarbaugh (third base); 29 Ty Van Burkleo (hitting)

== Notes/records ==
- On March 31, umpire Mike Winters became the first umpire to initiate a review under Major League Baseball's new replay system, wanting to confirm that Athletics catcher John Jaso did not block the plate unnecessarily as Michael Brantley attempted to score.
- On April 10, Danny Salazar became the first pitcher in the modern era (since 1900) to record 10 strikeouts before the end of the fourth inning of a game.
- On April 24, Corey Kluber became the first Indians pitcher to throw a complete game with 11+ strikeouts, 0 walks, and 0 earned runs since Len Barker's perfect game on May 15, 1981.
- On May 4, George Kottaras became the first player in franchise history to hit home runs in his first two at-bats as an Indian.
- On May 14, David Murphy and Lonnie Chisenhall both had 5 hits, the first time two Indians players had done so in the same nine-inning game since 1928.
- On May 21, the Indians defeated the Detroit Tigers 11–10 in 13 innings on a walk-off balk, the first one in the majors since July 4, 2011, and the first in extra innings since June 16, 2011.
- Corey Kluber recorded 60 strikeouts in May, the first Indians pitcher with 60+ strikeouts in a month since Dennis Eckersley in September 1976.
- On June 9, Lonnie Chisenhall became the first player to go 5–5 with 3 HR and 9 RBI since MLB began tracking RBI in 1920. The 9 RBI tied a franchise record, also accomplished by Chris James in 1991.
- On September 26, the Indians set a major league record for strikeouts by pitchers with 1,431, breaking the mark set by the 2013 Detroit Tigers. They ended the season with 1,450.
- On November 12, Corey Kluber became the 4th Indians pitcher to win the American League Cy Young Award.

== Farm system ==
Level	Team	League	Manager
AAA	Columbus Clippers	International League	Chris Tremie
AA	Akron RubberDucks	Eastern League	David Wallace
A	Carolina Mudcats	Carolina League	Scooter Tucker
A	Lake County Captains	Midwest League	Mark Budzinski
A-Short Season	Mahoning Valley Scrappers	New York–Penn League	Ted Kubiak
Rookie	AZL Indians	Arizona League	Tony Medrano

LEAGUE CHAMPIONS: AZL Indians
