= List of Cleveland Guardians Opening Day starting pitchers =

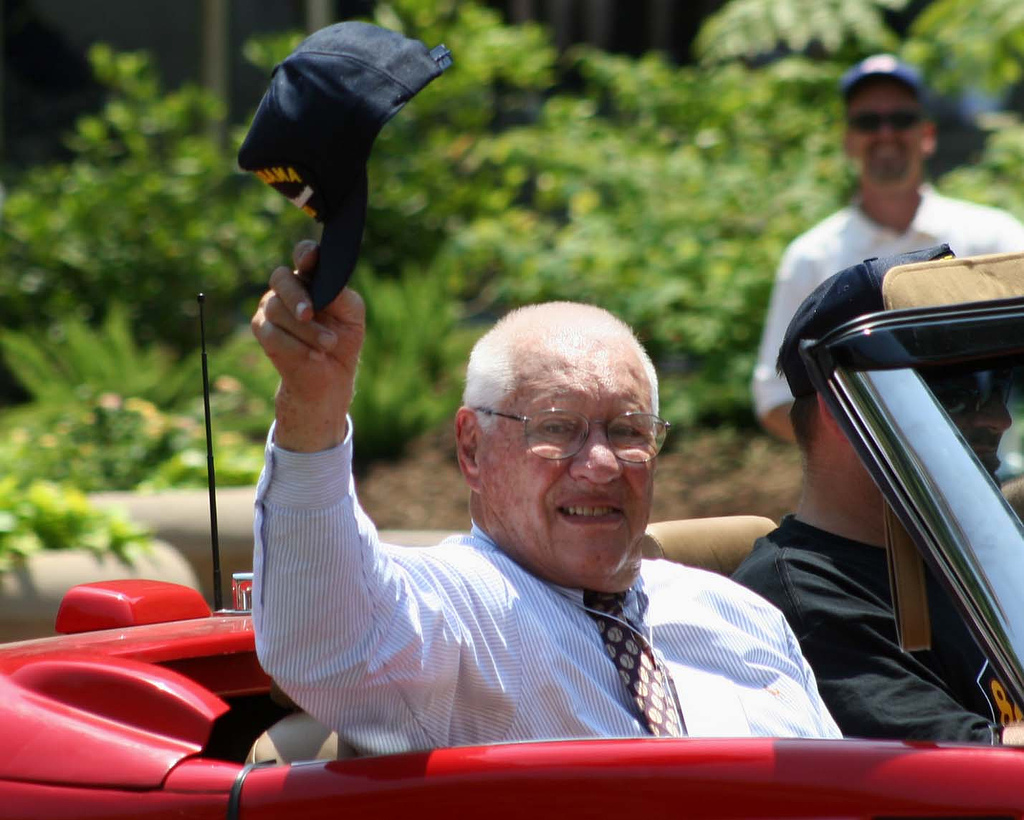
Bob Feller made seven Opening Day starts for the Cleveland Indians.

The Cleveland Guardians are a Major League Baseball (MLB) franchise based in Cleveland, Ohio; until 2021, they were known as the Cleveland Indians. They play in the American League Central division. The first game of the new baseball season is played on Opening Day, and being named the starter that day is an honor, which is often given to the player who is expected to lead the pitching staff that season, though there are various strategic reasons why a team's best pitcher might not start on Opening Day. Since joining the league in 1901, the Indians have used 60 different Opening Day starting pitchers which includes the Opening Day starting pitchers from the Bluebirds and the Naps. They have a record of 65 wins and 60 losses in their Opening Day games.

The Indians have played in three different home ball parks, League Park from 1901 through 1946, Cleveland Stadium from 1932 to 1993, and Progressive Field since 1994. From 1934 through 1946 some games were played at League Park and some at Cleveland Stadium. They had a record of 11 wins and 4 losses in Opening Day games at League Park, 9 wins and 13 losses at Cleveland Stadium and 2 wins and 4 losses at Progressive Field, for a total home record in Opening Day games of 22 wins and 21 losses. Their record in Opening Day away games is 35 wins and 35 losses.

Bob Feller has the most Opening Day starts for the Indians, with seven. Stan Coveleski had six Opening Day starts for the Indians, Bob Lemon, CC Sabathia and Corey Kluber each had five Opening Day starts, and Addie Joss, Willie Mitchell, Gaylord Perry and Charles Nagy each had four. Several Baseball Hall of Famers have made Opening Day starts for the Indians, including Feller, Coveleski, Lemon, Joss, Gaylord Perry, Dennis Eckersley and Early Wynn. Brothers Jim Perry and Gaylord Perry each made Opening Day starts for the Indians. Jim Perry started on Opening Day in 1961 and Gaylord Perry made Opening Day starts in 1972, 1973, 1974 and 1975.

The Indians have played in the World Series six times. They won in 1920 and 1948, and lost in 1954, 1995, 1997, and 2016. Coveleski was the Opening Day starting pitcher in 1920, Feller in 1948, Wynn in 1954, Dennis Martínez in 1995, Nagy in 1997, and Corey Kluber in 2016. The Indians are five and one in Opening Day games in those seasons, with the only loss coming in 2016. The Indians and the Toronto Blue Jays currently hold the record for the longest Opening Day game in Major League history. They set that record on Opening Day 2012, when the game lasted 16 innings. This broke the previous record of 15 innings between the Indians and the Detroit Tigers in 1960.

== Key ==
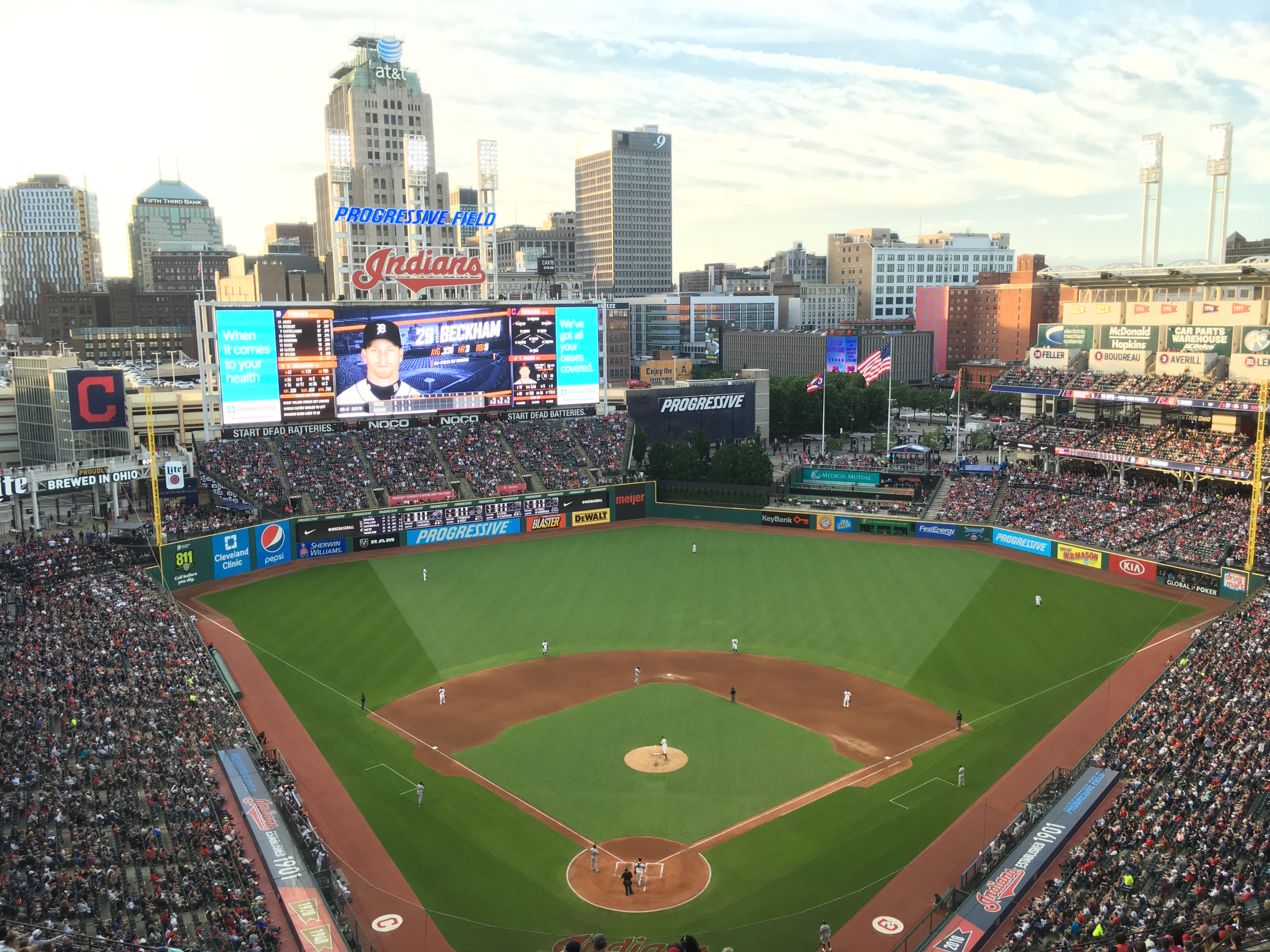
Progressive Field, home of the Cleveland Indians since 1994

W	Win
L	Loss
T	Tie game
ND (W)	No decision by starting pitcher; Cleveland won game
ND (L)	No decision by starting pitcher; Cleveland lost game
(W)	Cleveland won game; no information on starting pitcher's decision
(L)	Cleveland lost game; no information on starting pitcher's decision
Final score	Game score with Cleveland runs listed first
Location	Stadium in italics with ‡ for home game
(No.)	Number of appearances as Opening Day starter with Cleveland
*	Advanced to the post-season
**	American League champions
†	World Series champions

== Pitchers ==
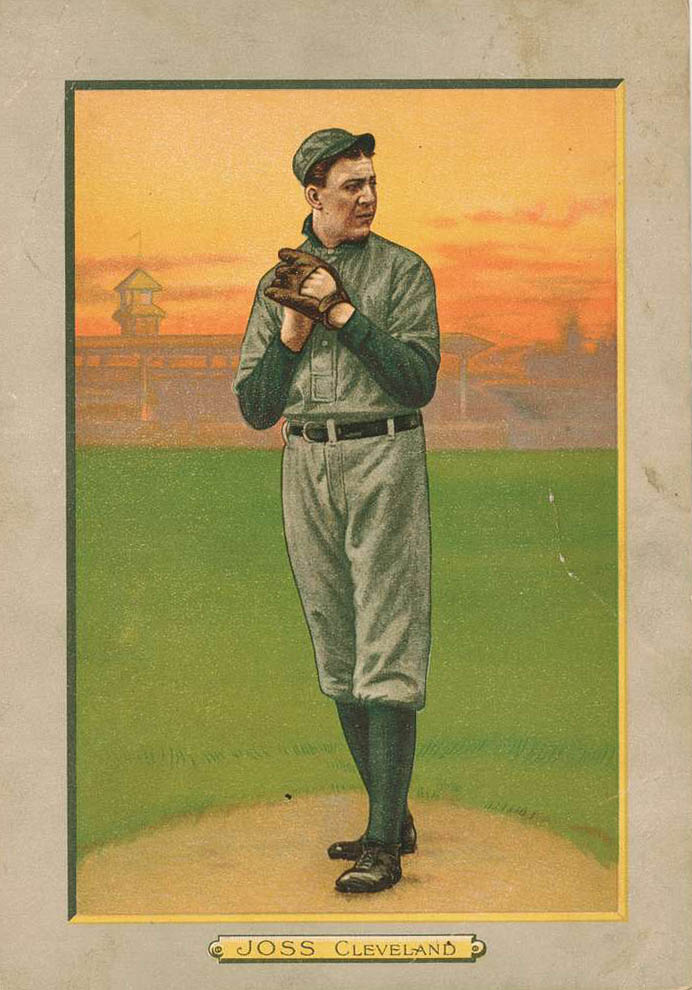
Addie Joss made four Opening Day starts for the Indians.

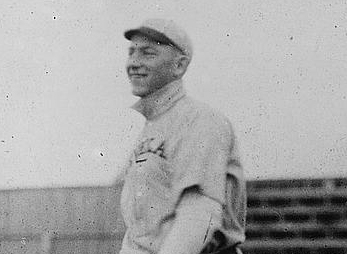
Willie Mitchell made four Opening Day starts for the Indians.

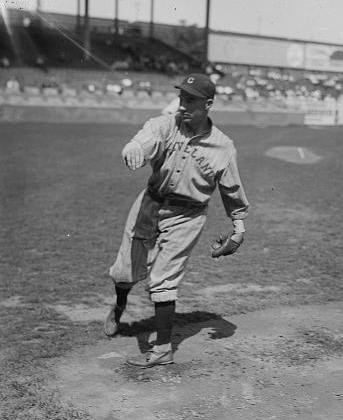
Stan Coveleski made six Opening Day starts for the Indians.

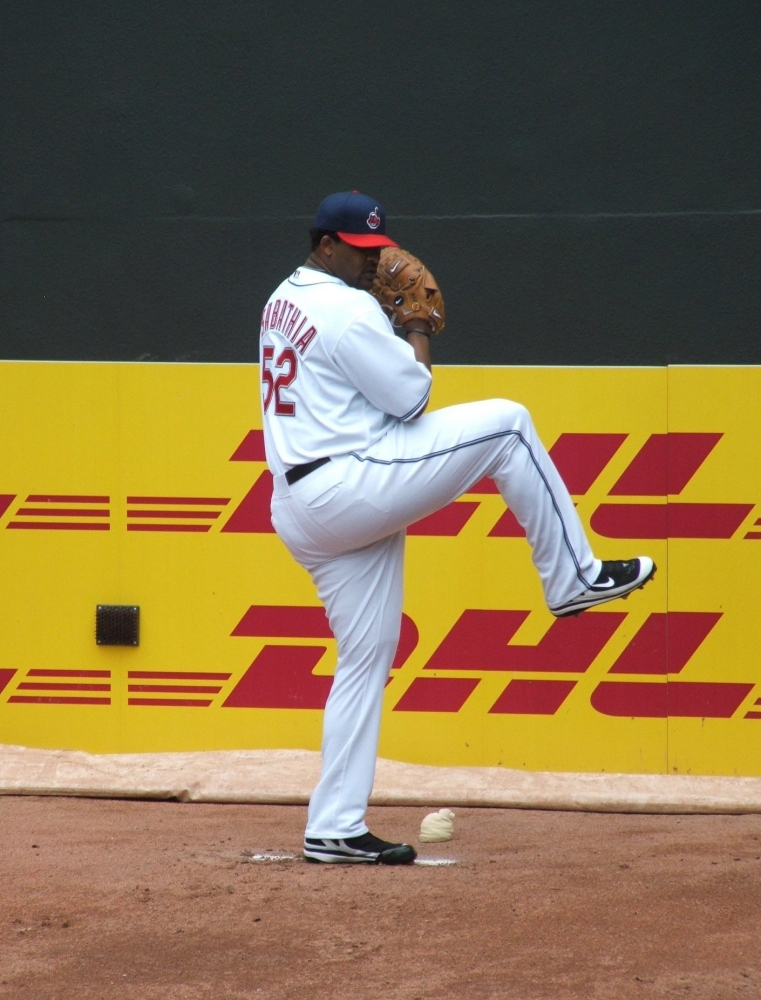
CC Sabathia made five Opening Day starts for the Indians.

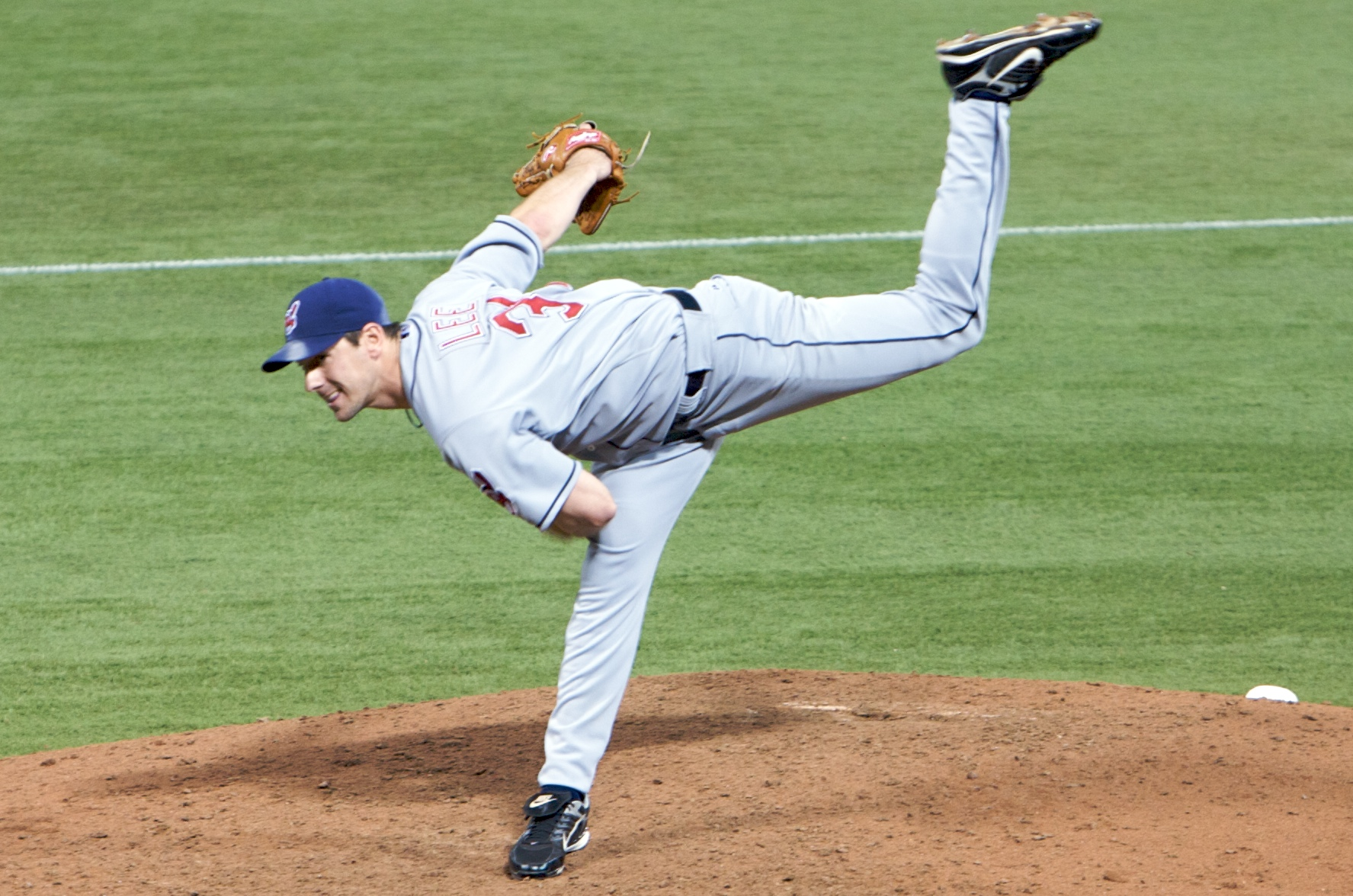
Cliff Lee was the Indians' Opening Day starter in 2009.

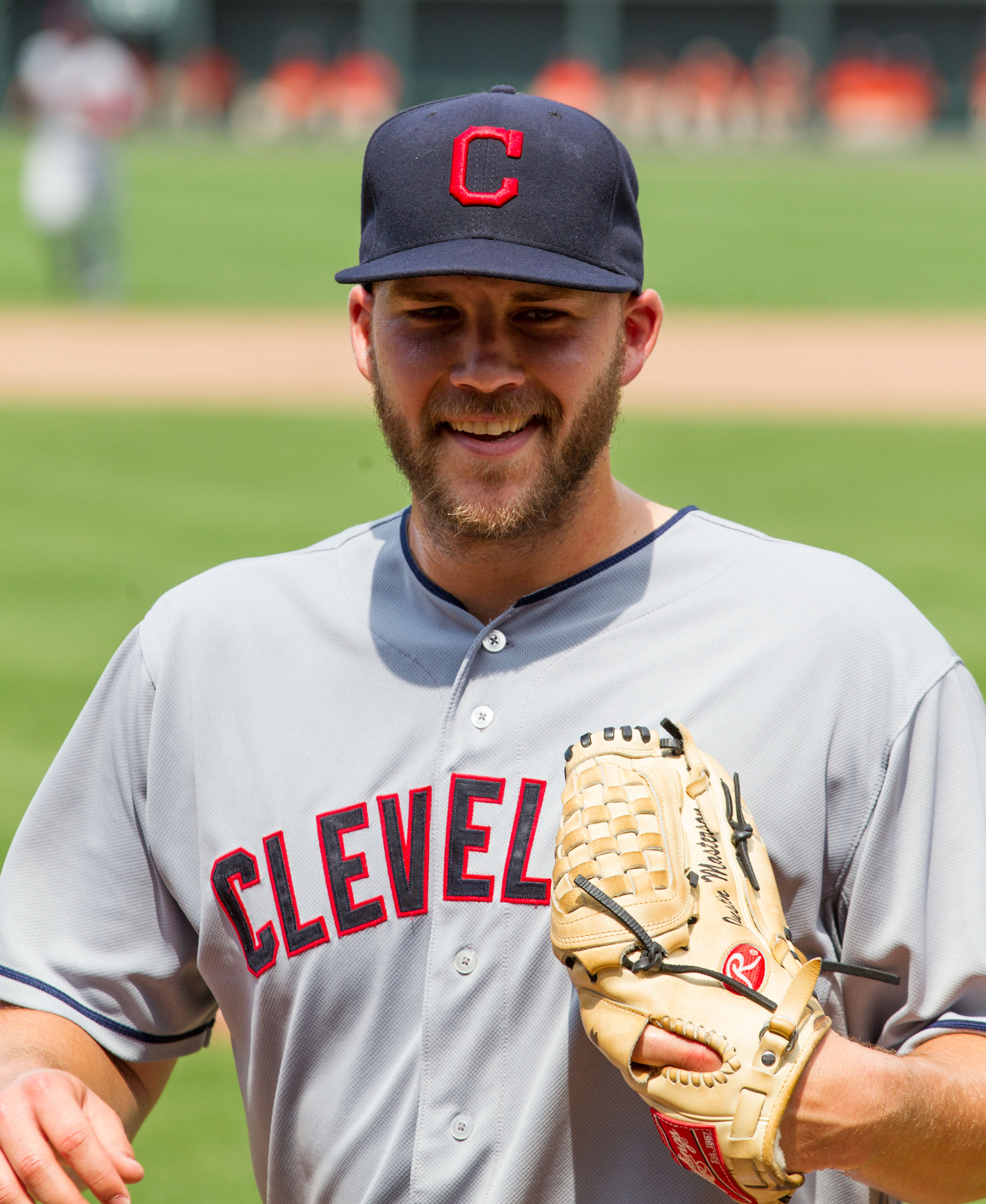
Justin Masterson was the Indians' Opening Day starting pitcher in 2012, 2013 and 2014.

Season	Pitcher	Decision	Final score	Opponent	Location	Ref(s)
1901	Bill Hoffer	(L)	2–8	Chicago White Sox	South Side Park	
1902	Earl Moore	(L)	2–5	St. Louis Browns	Sportsman's Park	
1903	Addie Joss	(L)	2–4	Detroit Tigers	Bennett Park	
1904	Bill Bernhard	(W)	6–1	Chicago White Sox	South Side Park	
1905	Earl Moore (2)	(W)	6–2	Detroit Tigers	League Park‡	
1906	Otto Hess	(W)	3–1	St. Louis Browns	Sportsman's Park	
1907	Glenn Liebhardt	(L)	0–2	Detroit Tigers	Bennett Park	
1908	Addie Joss (2)	(L)	1–2	St. Louis Browns	League Park‡	
1909	Addie Joss (3)	(W)	4–2	St. Louis Browns	Sportsman's Park	
1910	Addie Joss (4)	(W)	9–7	Detroit Tigers	Bennett Park	
1911	Fred Blanding	(L)	3–12	St. Louis Browns	Sportsman's Park	
1912	Willie Mitchell	(W)	3–2	Detroit Tigers	League Park‡	
1913	Vean Gregg	(W)	3–1	Chicago White Sox	League Park‡	
1914	Willie Mitchell (2)	(L)	2–5	Chicago White Sox	Comiskey Park	
1915	Willie Mitchell (3)	(W)	5–1	Detroit Tigers	Navin Field	
1916	Willie Mitchell (4)	(L)	1–6	St. Louis Browns	League Park‡	
1917	Stan Coveleski	(W)	6–4	Detroit Tigers	Navin Field	
1918	Stan Coveleski (2)	(W)	6–2	Detroit Tigers	League Park‡	
1919	Stan Coveleski (3)	(L)	2–4	Detroit Tigers	Navin Field	
1920†	Stan Coveleski (4)	W	5–0	St. Louis Browns	League Park‡	
1921	Stan Coveleski (5)	L	2–4	St. Louis Browns	Sportsman's Park	
1922	Guy Morton	W	7–4	Detroit Tigers	League Park‡	
1923	Stan Coveleski (6)	ND (W)	6–5	Chicago White Sox	League Park‡	
1924	Joe Shaute	L	3–4	Detroit Tigers	Navin Field	
1925	Sherry Smith	ND (W)	21–14	St. Louis Browns	Sportsman's Park	
1926	George Uhle	W	2–1	Detroit Tigers	Navin Field	
1927	George Uhle (2)	W	3–2	Chicago White Sox	League Park‡	
1928	George Uhle (3)	W	8–2	Chicago White Sox	Comiskey Park	
1929	Joe Shaute	ND (W)	5–4	Detroit Tigers	League Park‡	
1930	Willis Hudlin	(L)	7–8	Chicago White Sox	Comiskey Park	
1931	Wes Ferrell	W	5–4	Chicago White Sox	League Park‡	
1932	Wes Ferrell (2)	W	6–5	Detroit Tigers	Navin Field	
1933	Clint Brown	W	4–1	Detroit Tigers	Navin Field	
1934	Oral Hildebrand	W	5–2	St. Louis Browns	League Park‡	
1935	Mel Harder	W	2–1	St. Louis Browns	Sportsman's Park	
1936	Mel Harder (2)	(L)	0–3	Detroit Tigers	League Park‡	
1937	Mel Harder (3)	(L)	3–4	Detroit Tigers	Navin Field	
1938	Johnny Allen	(L)	2–6	St. Louis Browns	League Park‡	
1939	Bob Feller	W	5–1	Detroit Tigers	Cleveland Stadium‡	
1940	Bob Feller (2)	W	1–0	Chicago White Sox	Comiskey Park	
1941	Bob Feller (3)	(L)	3–4	Chicago White Sox	Cleveland Stadium‡	
1942	Jim Bagby	W	5–2	Detroit Tigers	Tiger Stadium	
1943	Jim Bagby (2)	W	1–0	Detroit Tigers	Cleveland Stadium‡	
1944	Al Smith	(L)	1–3	Chicago White Sox	Comiskey Park	
1945	Allie Reynolds	(L)	2–5	Chicago White Sox	Cleveland Stadium‡	
1946	Bob Feller (4)	W	1–0	Chicago White Sox	Comiskey Park	
1947	Bob Feller (5)	(L)	0–2	Chicago White Sox	Comiskey Park	
1948†	Bob Feller (6)	W	4–0	St. Louis Browns	Cleveland Stadium‡	
1949	Bob Feller (7)	(L)	1–5	St. Louis Browns	Sportsman's Park	
1950	Bob Lemon	(L)	6–7	Detroit Tigers	Cleveland Stadium‡	
1951	Bob Lemon (2)	W	2–1	Detroit Tigers	Briggs Stadium	
1952	Early Wynn	W	3–2	Chicago White Sox	Comiskey Park	
1953	Bob Lemon (3)	W	6–0	Chicago White Sox	Cleveland Stadium‡	
1954**	Early Wynn (2)	W	8–2	Chicago White Sox	Comiskey Park	
1955	Bob Lemon (4)	W	5–1	Chicago White Sox	Cleveland Stadium‡	
1956	Bob Lemon (5)	L	1–2	Chicago White Sox	Comiskey Park	
1957	Herb Score	L	2–3	Chicago White Sox	Cleveland Stadium‡	
1958	Herb Score (2)	L	0–5	Kansas City Athletics	Cleveland Stadium‡	
1959	Gary Bell	W	6–4	Kansas City Athletics	Municipal Stadium	
1960	Gary Bell (2)	ND (L)	2–4	Detroit Tigers	Cleveland Stadium‡	
1961	Jim Perry	W	9–5	Detroit Tigers	Tiger Stadium	
1962	Dick Donovan	W	4–0	Boston Red Sox	Fenway Park	
1963	Mudcat Grant	W	5–4	Minnesota Twins	Metropolitan Stadium	
1964	Mudcat Grant (2)	ND (L)	6–7	Minnesota Twins	Cleveland Stadium‡	
1965	Ralph Terry	W	7–1	California Angels	Dodger Stadium	
1966	Sam McDowell	W	5–2	Washington Senators	Robert F. Kennedy Stadium	
1967	Sam McDowell (2)	ND (L)	3–4	Kansas City Athletics	Municipal Stadium	
1968	Sonny Siebert	W	9–0	Chicago White Sox	Comiskey Park	
1969	Luis Tiant	L	2–6	Detroit Tigers	Tiger Stadium	
1970	Sam McDowell (3)	L	2–8	Baltimore Orioles	Cleveland Stadium‡	
1971	Steve Hargan	L	2–8	Detroit Tigers	Tiger Stadium	
1972	Gaylord Perry	L	1–5	Milwaukee Brewers	Cleveland Stadium‡	
1973	Gaylord Perry (2)	W	2–1	Detroit Tigers	Cleveland Stadium‡	
1974	Gaylord Perry (3)	L	1–6	New York Yankees	Yankee Stadium	
1975	Gaylord Perry (4)	W	5–3	New York Yankees	Cleveland Stadium‡	
1976	Dennis Eckersley	L	1–3	Detroit Tigers	Cleveland Stadium‡	
1977	Dennis Eckersley (2)	ND (W)	5–4	Boston Red Sox	Fenway Park	
1978	Wayne Garland	W	8–5	Kansas City Royals	Cleveland Stadium‡	
1979	Rick Wise	L	1–7	Boston Red Sox	Fenway Park	
1980	Dan Spillner	L	2–10	California Angels	Anaheim Stadium	
1981	Bert Blyleven	L	3–5	Milwaukee Brewers	Cleveland Stadium‡	
1982	Rick Waits	L	3–8	Texas Rangers	Cleveland Stadium‡	
1983	Rick Sutcliffe	W	8–5	Oakland Athletics	Oakland Coliseum	
1984	Rick Sutcliffe (2)	W	9–1	Texas Rangers	Arlington Stadium	
1985	Bert Blyleven (2)	ND (L)	4–5	Detroit Tigers	Tiger Stadium	
1986	Ken Schrom	W	6–4	Baltimore Orioles	Memorial Stadium	
1987	Tom Candiotti	L	3–4	Toronto Blue Jays	Exhibition Stadium	
1988	Tom Candiotti (2)	ND (L)	3–4	Texas Rangers	Arlington Stadium	
1989	Greg Swindell	W	2–1	Milwaukee Brewers	Cleveland Stadium‡	
1990	Bud Black	ND (L)	4–6	New York Yankees	Yankee Stadium	
1991	Greg Swindell (2)	L	2–4	Kansas City Royals	Kauffman Stadium	
1992	Charles Nagy	L	0–2	Baltimore Orioles	Camden Yards	
1993	Charles Nagy (2)	L	1–9	New York Yankees	Cleveland Stadium‡	
1994	Dennis Martínez	ND (W)	4–3	Seattle Mariners	Jacobs Field‡	
1995**	Dennis Martínez (2)	W	11–6	Texas Rangers	Rangers Ballpark in Arlington	
1996*	Dennis Martínez (3)	L	1–7	New York Yankees	Jacobs Field‡	
1997**	Charles Nagy (3)	ND (W)	9–7	Oakland Athletics	Oakland Coliseum	
1998*	Charles Nagy (4)	ND (W)	10–9	Seattle Mariners	Kingdome	
1999*	Jaret Wright	ND (L)	5–6	Anaheim Angels	Angel Stadium of Anaheim	
2000	Bartolo Colón	W	4–1	Baltimore Orioles	Camden Yards	
2001*	Bartolo Colón (2)	L	4–7	Chicago White Sox	Jacobs Field‡	
2002	Bartolo Colón (3)	W	6–0	Anaheim Angels	Angel Stadium of Anaheim	
2003	CC Sabathia	ND (L)	5–6	Baltimore Orioles	Camden Yards	
2004	CC Sabathia (2)	ND (L)	4–7	Minnesota Twins	Hubert H. Humphrey Metrodome	
2005	Jake Westbrook	L	0–1	Chicago White Sox	Comiskey Park	
2006	CC Sabathia (3)	ND (L)	4–10	Chicago White Sox	Comiskey Park	
2007*	CC Sabathia (4)	W	12–5	Chicago White Sox	Comiskey Park	
2008	CC Sabathia (5)	ND (W)	10–8	Chicago White Sox	Progressive Field‡	
2009	Cliff Lee	L	1–9	Texas Rangers	Rangers Ballpark in Arlington	
2010	Jake Westbrook (2)	L	0–6	Chicago White Sox	U.S. Cellular Field	
2011	Fausto Carmona	L	10–15	Chicago White Sox	Progressive Field‡	
2012	Justin Masterson	ND (L)	4–7	Toronto Blue Jays	Progressive Field‡	
2013*	Justin Masterson (2)	W	4–1	Toronto Blue Jays	Rogers Centre	
2014	Justin Masterson (3)	ND (W)	2–0	Oakland Athletics	O.co Coliseum	
2015	Corey Kluber	L	0–2	Houston Astros	Minute Maid Park	
2016**	Corey Kluber (2)	L	2–6	Boston Red Sox	Progressive Field‡	
2017*	Corey Kluber (3)	ND (W)	9–5	Texas Rangers	Globe Life Park in Arlington	
2018*	Corey Kluber (4)	L	1–2	Seattle Mariners	Safeco Field	
2019	Corey Kluber (5)	L	0–2	Minnesota Twins	Target Field	
2020*	Shane Bieber	W	2–0	Kansas City Royals	Progressive Field‡	
2021	Shane Bieber (2)	L	2–3	Detroit Tigers	Comerica Park	
2022*	Shane Bieber (3)	ND (L)	1–3	Kansas City Royals	Kauffman Stadium	
2023	Shane Bieber (4)	ND (L)	0–3	Seattle Mariners	T-Mobile Park	
2024*	Shane Bieber (5)	W	8–0	Oakland Athletics	Oakland Coliseum	
2025*	Ben Lively (Note: Tanner Bibee was named the Opening Day starting pitcher, but was scratched due to acute gastroenteritis.)	ND (W)	7–4	Kansas City Royals	Kauffman Stadium	
2026*	Tanner Bibee	ND (W)	6–4	Seattle Mariners	T-Mobile Park	
