= Justin Masterson =

American baseball player (born 1985)

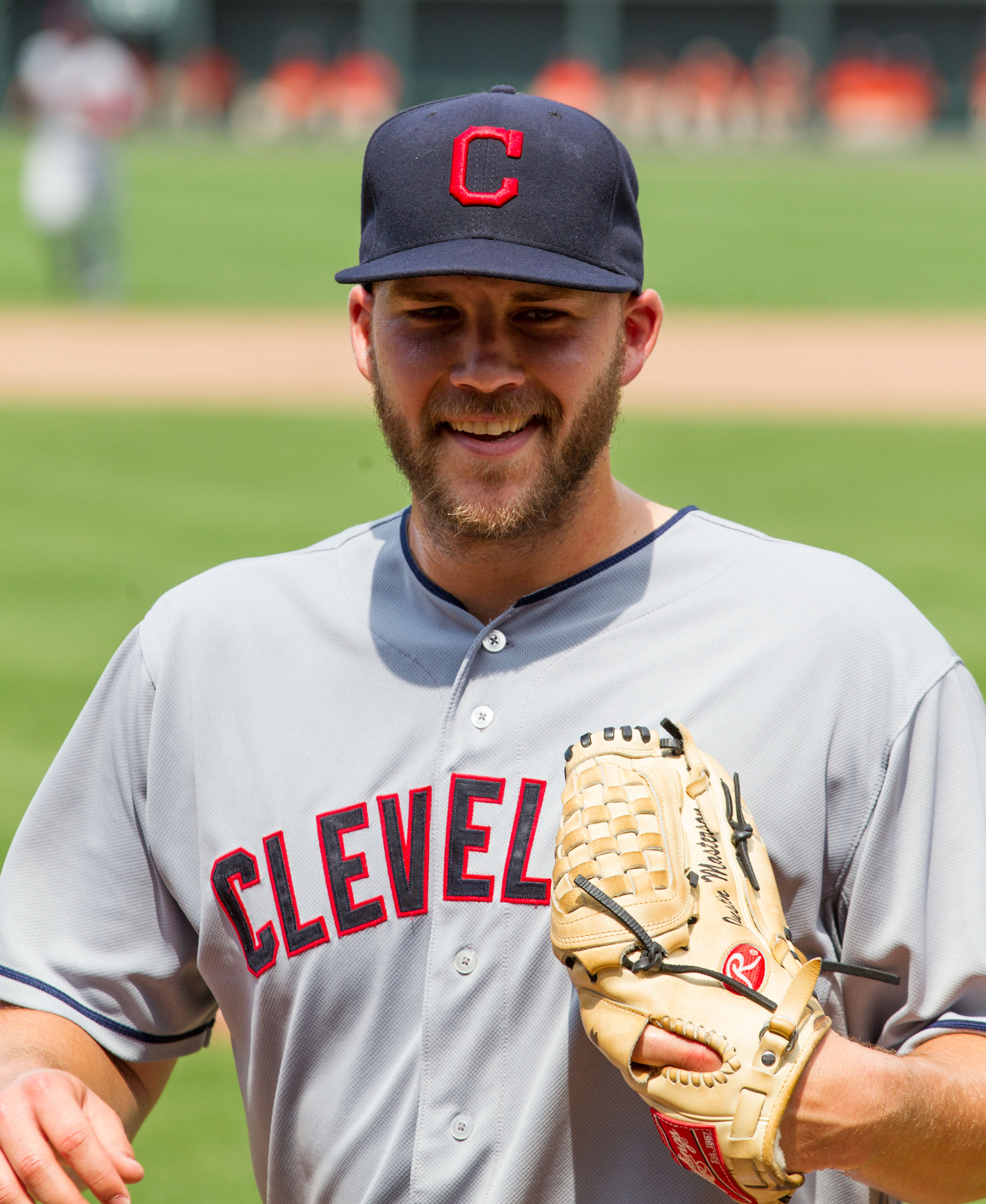
- Masterson with the Cleveland Indians in 2012
- Pitcher
- Born: March 22, 1985 (age 41); Kingston, Jamaica
- Batted: Right Threw: Right

MLB debut
- April 24, 2008, for the Boston Red Sox

Last MLB appearance
- August 9, 2015, for the Boston Red Sox

MLB statistics
- Win–loss record: 64–74
- Earned run average: 4.31
- Strikeouts: 1,004
- Stats at Baseball Reference

Teams
- Boston Red Sox (2008–2009); Cleveland Indians (2009–2014); St. Louis Cardinals (2014); Boston Red Sox (2015)

Career highlights and awards
- All-Star (2013)

Justin Daniel Masterson (born March 22, 1985) is a Jamaican-American former professional baseball starting pitcher. Drafted by the Red Sox in the second round of the 2006 MLB draft from San Diego State University, he made his MLB debut two years later. Masterson also played in MLB for the Cleveland Indians and St. Louis Cardinals. Known for primarily throwing a sinking fastball, the right-hander stands 6 ft 6 in (198 cm) tall, and weighs 250 lb (110 kg).

A former All-Star selection, Masterson placed in the top-ten in the American League multiple categories in 2013, including wins, strikeouts, complete games, hits per nine innings pitched, and strikeouts per nine innings pitched. He was the first Red Sox pitcher since Fenway Park's 1912 opening to make his first four consecutive starts there and not lose any of them.

== Early life ==
Masterson was born in Kingston, Jamaica, where his father served as dean of students at the Jamaica Theological Seminary. Eventually, the family moved to Beavercreek, Ohio, where he attended Beavercreek High School, playing basketball and baseball as a catcher, pitcher, and first baseman. His parents are both academics; his mother works as a teacher and his father is a pastor.

Masterson attended Bethel College in Mishawaka, Indiana, where he played as a starting pitcher. While at Bethel, he hit 10 home runs (HR) during his sophomore year. He then attended San Diego State University. In 2005, Masterson played collegiate summer baseball for the Wareham Gatemen of the Cape Cod Baseball League (CCBL). He posted a 1.15 ERA with 39 strikeouts in 31.1 innings pitched. In 2017, he was inducted into the CCBL Hall of Fame.

== Professional career ==
=== Boston Red Sox ===
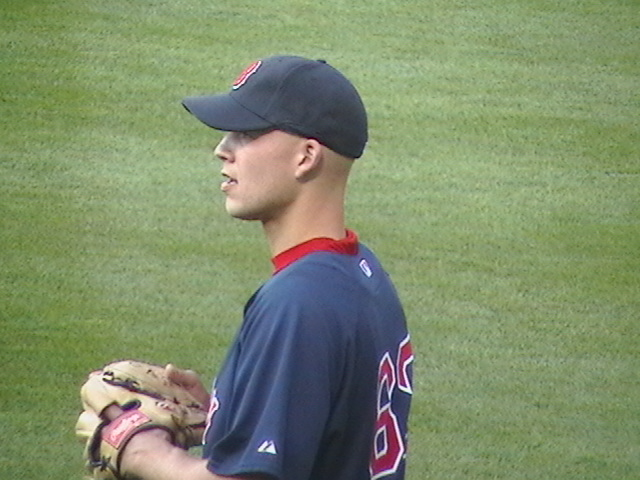
Masterson with the Boston Red Sox in 2008

Baseball America rated Masterson as the 64th-best overall prospect for their 2006 Major League Baseball draft projections. The Boston Red Sox selected him in the second round. Dan Madsen signed him. Masterson began as both a starter and reliever in his minor league career for the Lowell Spinners. In 2007, his second season, the club promoted him from the Class A Lancaster JetHawks to the Double-A Portland Sea Dogs. His twelve wins that season ranked second among all Red Sox minor leaguers.

After joining the Sea Dogs, Masterson said, "I've had the confidence to be a great pitcher all along. I went to a smaller school and really proved that I had the ability to pitch, and whatever route I took to get me where I am I'm not worried about it."

In 2006, Masterson was named to Baseball America's short season all-star team. Masterson converted to starting pitching in early 2007, after a stint as a relief pitcher for Short Season Lowell in 2006.

The Red Sox invited Masterson to spring training before the 2008 season. On April 24, he made his Major League debut against the Los Angeles Angels of Anaheim in an emergency call-up start. He pitched six full innings (IP) and allowed one run. The Red Sox immediately sent him back to Portland following the game. The next month, on May 20, he made his second appearance, pitching 6 1/3 innings, allowing three hits and one run with three walks and five strikeouts and picking up his first win in the Majors.

After five starts with the major-league club, it was announced that he would stay in the majors through Daisuke Matsuzaka's return from the disabled list (DL) due to Bartolo Colón's back injury. On July 7, 2008, Masterson was sent back to the Pawtucket Red Sox, a move manager Terry Francona stated was made to transition Masterson from a starter to a relief pitcher. Masterson was recalled on July 20 due to an injury to David Aardsma In his first relief appearance, he was solid against the Seattle Mariners, shutting down the hitters and working 2 2/3 scoreless innings at Safeco Field in Seattle.

Masterson picked up the first postseason win of his career in Game 5 of the 2008 American League Championship Series (ALCS) against the Tampa Bay Rays, pitching a scoreless ninth inning in the Red Sox' 8–7 victory.

In 2009, Masterson began the season in the bullpen while also starting six games before being traded to the Cleveland Indians.

=== Cleveland Indians ===
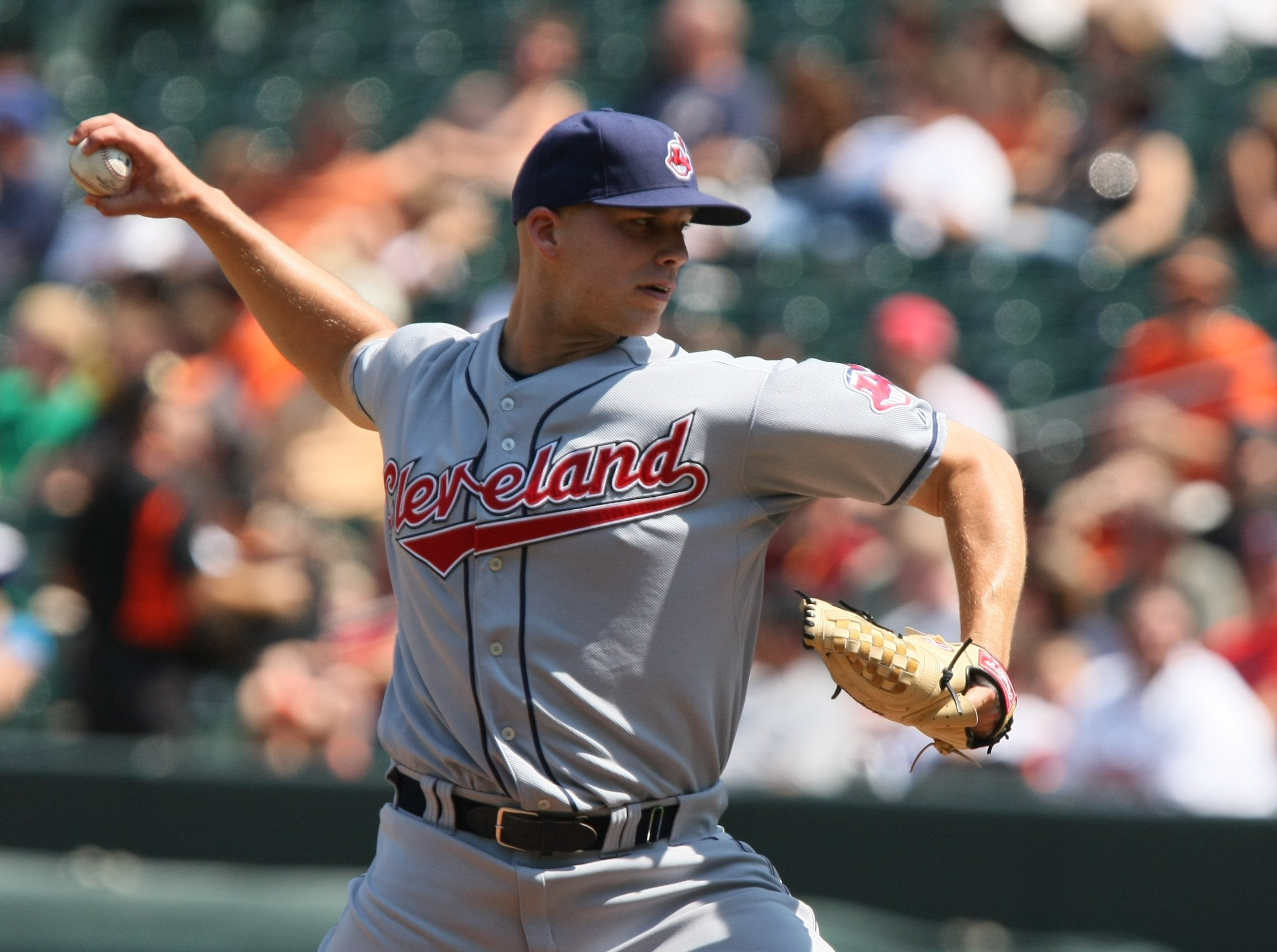
Masterson pitching for the Indians in 2009

On July 31, 2009, Masterson was traded by Boston along with minor league prospects Nick Hagadone and Bryan Price to the Cleveland Indians in exchange for Victor Martinez.

Upon arriving to Cleveland, Masterson was inserted into the Indians rotation. He started 10 games, struggling to a record of 1–7 for the rest of 2009.

Masterson enjoyed his first full season as a starter in 2010, but he once again failed to make an impact with the Indians and finished with a 6–13 record in 29 starts. Nevertheless, Masterson seemed to save his best stuff for when he was facing his former Red Sox teammates. He pitched the first shutout of his professional career on June 9 of that season, a two-hit, 11–0 victory against Boston at Progressive Field, in which he struck out six and allowed two singles and two walks.

Masterson finished the 2011 season with a 12–10 record, having career bests in ERA (3.21), innings pitched (216) and home runs allowed (11). On August 4, he victimized the Red Sox for the second time, and also committed one of the rarer feats in baseball. In the bottom of the second inning, Masterson struck out Josh Reddick swinging before a wild pitch allowed Reddick to reach first base on the play. Then, Masterson proceeded to strike out Jason Varitek, Marco Scutaro and Jacoby Ellsbury in succession to end the inning, making him one of 68 pitchers in Major League history to strike out four batters in a single inning.

Following the end of the season Masterson underwent surgery to repair a torn labrum in his non-throwing shoulder. The surgery was required after enduring an injury in 2007 as a member of the Red Sox.

On April 5, 2012, the Indians made Masterson the Opening Day starter for the first time in his career. The game was against the Toronto Blue Jays in what proved to be the longest Opening Day game in major league history, a 7–4 loss in 16 innings. He completed eight innings, giving up two hits and one run while striking out 10, and earned a no-decision. However, he regressed in his third season with the Indians, finishing 11–15 with a career-worst 4.93 ERA in 34 starts. The Indians hired Francona to be their manager the following October, reuniting the pitcher with his former manager.

For the 2013 season, the Indians again named Masterson the Opening Day starting pitcher. He defeated Blue Jays' reigning NL Cy Young Award winner R. A. Dickey, acquired in the prior off-season from the New York Mets. In his next start, his second win came against the reigning American League Cy Young winner, David Price of the Rays. According to the Elias Sports Bureau, Masterson became just the third player in MLB history to defeat both reigning Cy Young winners in the same season – and the first to do so in his first two starts of the season.

With his sixth campaign about to begin and no contract, Masterson was eligible to become a free agent for the first time in his career. He was also arbitration-eligible. Instead, Masterson and the Indians agreed to a one-year, $9.7 million contract in February 2014, for the 2014 season. The two parties also began talks for a contract extension beyond 2014. However, the next month, discussions were ended until after the season. Masterson had offered the club extensions for $17 million per year in separate offers of two and three years, with option years, but that was more than the Indians were willing to pay. A pitcher with similar career achievements, Homer Bailey, had signed an extension for more years with the Cincinnati Reds at $17.5 million per year.

Tapped for his third consecutive Opening Day start, Masterson pitched seven scoreless innings but did not qualify for a decision in a 2–0 extra innings victory against the Oakland Athletics. On June 2, he completed an immaculate inning against the Red Sox, striking out Jonny Gomes, Grady Sizemore, and Stephen Drew in order on nine pitches. Only 72 pitchers have accomplished that feat in Major League history.

=== St. Louis Cardinals ===
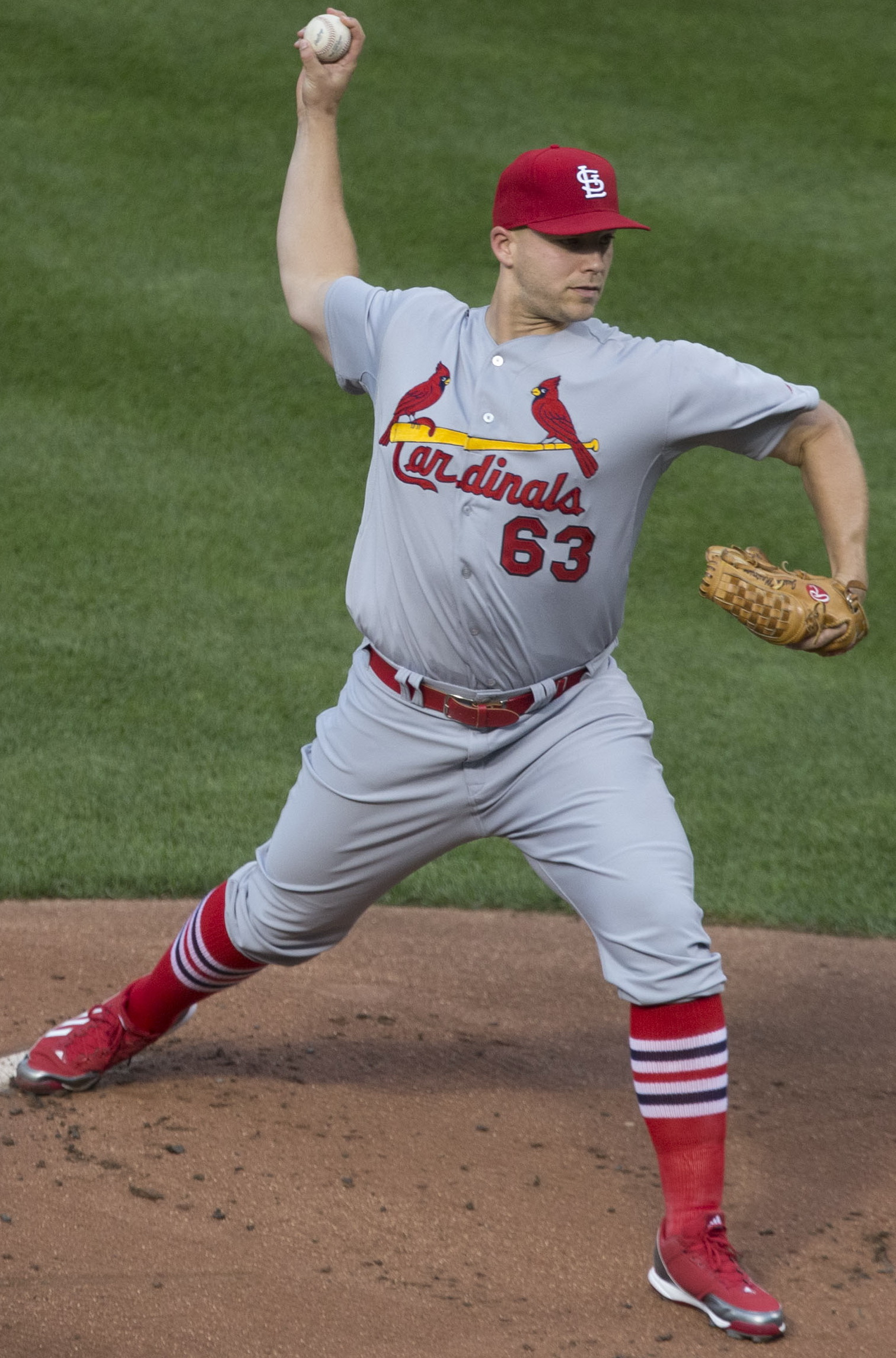
Masterson with the St. Louis Cardinals

On July 30, 2014, the Indians traded Masterson to the St. Louis Cardinals for outfielder James Ramsey. To honor their former teammate, all Indians players donned Masterson's high-sock style for the next game after his trade against the Mariners. Masterson had been on the DL due to a knee injury for nearly a month when he was traded. The Cardinals activated him from the DL on August 1. He won his Cardinals debut against the Milwaukee Brewers the next day, a 9–7 victory, in spite of allowing five runs, seven hits and three walks in six IP. While batting, he collected his first hit and run scored of the season.

=== Return to Boston Red Sox ===
A free agent after the 2014 season, Masterson agreed to a one-year deal with Boston worth $9.5 million on December 11. On August 10, 2015, Masterson was designated for assignment by Boston. The first move of new general manager Dave Dombrowski was his release on August 19.

=== Pittsburgh Pirates ===
On April 14, 2016, Masterson agreed to a minor league deal with the Pittsburgh Pirates organization. He played in 25 games for the Triple–A Indianapolis Indians, recording a 4.97 ERA with 32 strikeouts in 54 1/3 innings pitched. He elected free agency following the season on November 7.

=== Los Angeles Dodgers ===
On March 27, 2017, Masterson signed a minor league contract with the Los Angeles Dodgers and he was assigned to the Triple-A Oklahoma City Dodgers to begin the season. He pitched in Triple–A all year and was 11–6 with a 4.13 ERA in 25 starts. He elected free agency following the season on November 6.

On December 11, 2018, Masterson announced his retirement from professional baseball.

== Pitching profile ==
Masterson pitched at a low three-quarter arm-slot (nearly sidearm) with a sliding motion, which some compare to Dennis Eckersley's delivery. His pitching arsenal included a fastball that reached 97 miles per hour (156 km/h), a sinker, a slider, and an occasional change-up. It has been claimed that his best pitch is his plus-sinker with a heavy drop.

Masterson threw a variety of fastballs that varied in speed and break, with the speeds reaching between from the upper 80s to the mid 90s. The speed of his slider was in the low 80s, and his change-up ranged from 77–81 miles per hour (124–130 km/h). He varied his sinker at speeds of 84–96 miles per hour (135–154 km/h), sometimes catching batters off balance.

== Personal life ==
Masterson married Meryl Ham on November 3, 2007. Masterson is a Christian and often speaks of the importance of God in his life. He spoke at the Pentagon's weekly prayer breakfast in June 2009.

He has been a volunteer coach at local high schools in his community, and helps to mentor young athletes.

== Philanthropy ==
Masterson and his wife Meryl founded the non-profit Fortress Foundation in 2013 with the help of business partner Matt Zappasodi and Cullinane Law. In February 2013, they partnered with Not For Sale Team.

In 2013, they worked with the Feed Their Future campaign with Mark Zimmerman from Moody Radio Cleveland and Bright Hope in Nairobi, Kenya. They partnered again in 2014 and 2015.

Justin and Meryl have helped other non-profits like Ascent 121, and International Justice Mission. Justin has been instrumental in starting PHARE Warrior, Wayfinders, Cvltivate Cvlture non-profits.

== See also ==
- List of Major League Baseball pitchers who have thrown an immaculate inning
- List of people from Kingston, Jamaica
