= Bryan Price (pitcher) =

American baseball player (born 1986)

- Pitcher
- Born: November 13, 1986 (age 39); Corpus Christi, Texas, U.S.
- Batted: Right Threw: Right

MLB debut
- September 1, 2014, for the Cleveland Indians

Last appearance
- September 8, 2014, for the Cleveland Indians

MLB statistics
- Win–loss record: 0–0
- Earned run average: 20.25
- Strikeouts: 1
- Stats at Baseball Reference

Teams
- Cleveland Indians (2014)

Bryan Cole Price (born November 13, 1986) is an American former professional baseball pitcher. He played in Major League Baseball (MLB) for the Cleveland Indians.

== Career ==
=== Boston Red Sox ===
Price was drafted by the Boston Red Sox in the first round of the 2008 Major League Baseball draft out of Rice University. He spent the 2008 season with the Lowell Spinners, where he had a 1–3 record and a 3.83 earned run average (ERA) in 12 games. He spent the first half of the 2009 season with the Salem Red Sox and the Greenville Drive, playing in 19 combined games.

=== Cleveland Indians ===
Price was traded from the Red Sox to the Cleveland Indians with Nick Hagadone and Justin Masterson for Víctor Martínez on July 31, 2009. He finished the 2009 season with the Kinston Indians. In 2010 he was promoted to the Akron Aeros, and finished the season with a 6–3 record and 3.25 ERA in 40 games. After spending the offseason with the Peoria Javelinas in the Arizona Fall League, Price spent 2011 with Akron, going 2–3 with a 2.79 ERA in 28 games. He split the 2012 and 2013 seasons between Akron and the Columbus Clippers, with his best numbers coming in 2013 with Akron, finishing that part of the season with a 1–0 record and 0.56 ERA in 12 games. He was added to the team's 40-man roster on November 20, 2013.

After spending the 2014 season again between the now-Akron RubberDucks and Columbus, Price made his major league debut on September 1, 2014. He gave up a home run to Miguel Cabrera in his first game and made two further appearances that September, all in relief. After playing in four games for Columbus early in the 2015 season, Price decided to retire rather accept a demotion from Columbus to Akron.
