= Víctor Martínez (baseball) =

Venezuelan baseball player (born 1978)

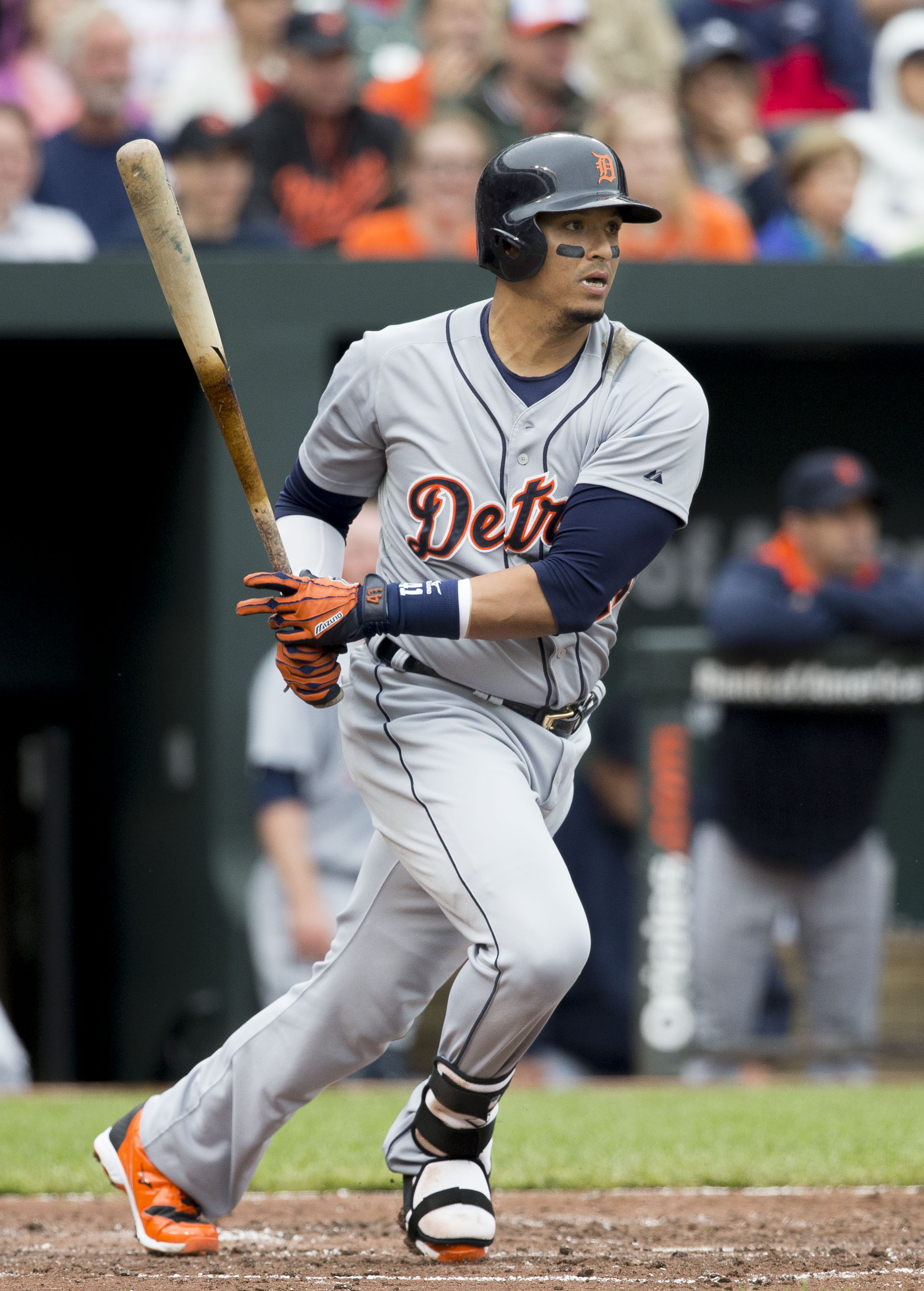
- Martínez with the Detroit Tigers in 2014
- Catcher / Designated hitter
- Born: December 23, 1978 (age 47); Ciudad Bolívar, Venezuela
- Batted: Switch Threw: Right

MLB debut
- September 10, 2002, for the Cleveland Indians

Last MLB appearance
- September 22, 2018, for the Detroit Tigers

MLB statistics
- Batting average: .295
- Hits: 2,153
- Home runs: 246
- Runs batted in: 1,178
- Stats at Baseball Reference

Teams
- Cleveland Indians (2002–2009); Boston Red Sox (2009–2010); Detroit Tigers (2011, 2013–2018)

Career highlights and awards
- 5× All-Star (2004, 2007, 2009, 2010, 2014); 2× Silver Slugger Award (2004, 2014)

Víctor Jesús Martínez (born December 23, 1978), also known by his nickname "V-Mart", is a Venezuelan former professional baseball catcher and designated hitter. Martínez played in Major League Baseball (MLB) for the Cleveland Indians, Boston Red Sox, and Detroit Tigers. After joining the Tigers, he played mostly as a designated hitter.

Martínez was a five-time MLB All-Star. He won the Silver Slugger Award twice, and the Edgar Martínez Award once. He finished runner-up for the American League Most Valuable Player award in 2014. When he retired in 2018, he was seventh among all active players in RBI (1,178).

== Career ==
=== Cleveland Indians (2002–2009) ===
Martínez was signed by the Indians as an amateur free agent in 1996. He was named the Indians 2001 and 2002 Minor League Player of the Year (receiving the "Lou Boudreau Award"). After a pair of minor league MVP awards and batting titles in 2001 and 2002, Cleveland added Martínez to their active roster as a September call-up on September 9, 2002. He made his debut with Cleveland on September 10, going 1-for-4 with 2 RBI in a 5–4 loss to the Toronto Blue Jays. Martínez's first major league hit was a two-run single in the seventh inning off Blue Jays pitcher Justin Miller. On September 29, Martínez and Earl Snyder hit back-to-back home runs in a 7–3 win over the Kansas City Royals. Both home runs were the first of their careers. In 12 games with Cleveland, Martínez hit .281 with a home run and 5 RBI.

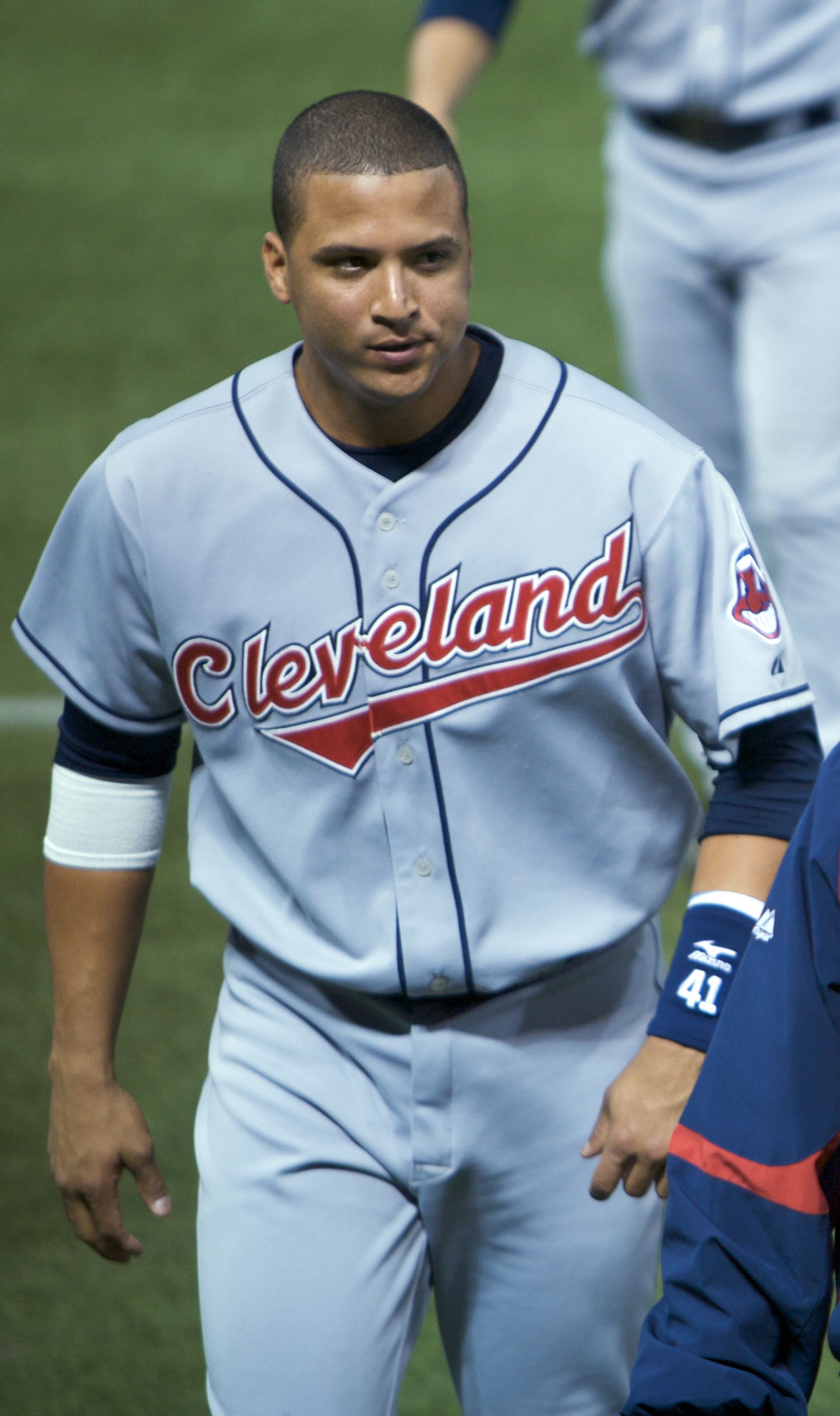
Martínez with the Cleveland Indians in 2008

In 2003, Martínez played for the Triple-A Buffalo Bisons and the Indians. He finished with a combined .315 batting average, hitting at a .349 clip in August and September with the big league club. Exhibiting knowledge of the strike zone and an ability to make contact, he reduced his strikeout totals and produced a combined .376 on-base percentage. He also drove in 63 runs, hitting .323 with runners in scoring position, and was selected to participate in the All-Star Futures Game played at Chicago's U.S. Cellular Field. From 2001 to 2003, the Venezuelan slugger batted a combined .330 with 40 home runs and 194 RBI.

==== 2004 ====
In his first full major league season, Martínez hit .283 with 23 home runs and 108 RBI in 141 games as the Indians' starting catcher for 2004. His 108 RBI set a record for Indians catchers. He also earned his first All-Star selection, and shared the Silver Slugger honor as the top-hitting American League catcher with Iván Rodríguez. For the first time since the awards began in 1980, there was a tie at one position. On July 16, Martínez also had the best offensive night by an Indians catcher in franchise history; he hit three home runs, singled twice, drew a walk, and drove in a career-high seven runs in a perfect 5-for-5 game against the Seattle Mariners.

==== 2005 ====
At the end of Cleveland's game on June 11, 2005, Martínez was batting .207. However, he turned his season around in the second half, batting .380 (100-for-263) after the All-Star break, the best for any Major League player in that stretch. He finished the season with a .305 average, 20 home runs and 80 RBI in 147 games.

==== 2006 ====
Beginning in 2006, the Indians occasionally played Martínez at first base. As a catcher in 2006, he allowed 100 stolen bases, the most in Major League Baseball. He had a successful season at the plate, hitting .316 with 37 doubles, 16 home runs and 93 RBI in 153 games.

==== 2007 ====
In 2007, Martínez hit .301 with 25 home runs and led all major league catchers with a career-high 114 RBI in 147 games. He finished seventh in the American League MVP voting, and also made his second AL All-Star team. The Indians won the American League Central, marking Martínez's first postseason appearance. In his postseason debut in Game 1 of the 2007 American League Division Series, he finished the game 3-for-5 with a home run, a double and 2 RBI in Cleveland's 12–3 win over the New York Yankees. Martínez went on to bat .353 with a home run and 4 RBI in the four-game series victory. In the 2007 American League Championship Series, Martínez hit .296 with a home run and 3 RBI in Cleveland's seven-game defeat to the eventual World Series champion Boston Red Sox.

==== 2008 ====
The 2008 season was an injury-marred season for Martínez. In Cleveland's first game of the season on March 31 against the Chicago White Sox, he exited the game in the second inning with left hamstring tightness. He made his return to the starting lineup on April 7, finishing 2-for-4 with an RBI double in a 6–4 loss to the Los Angeles Angels of Anaheim. From April 17 to May 4, Martínez posted a 15-game hitting streak in which he batted .344 with five doubles and 5 RBI. After batting .350 in April, Martínez subsequently hit .221 in May and .200 in June. On June 13, he underwent successful arthroscopic surgery on his right elbow, which had been bothering him in mid-May. On August 29, Martínez was activated from the disabled list. He finished the season with a then career-low .278 batting average, two home runs and 35 RBI in 73 games.

==== 2009 ====
On June 19, 2009, Martínez hit his 100th career home run against Rich Harden of the Chicago Cubs. On July 5, he was selected to represent Cleveland in the 2009 All-Star Game, his third career selection. In 99 games before being traded, Martínez batted .284 with 15 home runs and 67 RBI. His departure from the Indians created a public relations problem for the ballclub. The team had scheduled two separate Martínez-related promotional giveaways (bobbleheads on August 1, chest protector backpacks five days later) for dates subsequent to the transaction. Despite the trade, both promotions went off as planned.

=== Boston Red Sox (2009–2010) ===
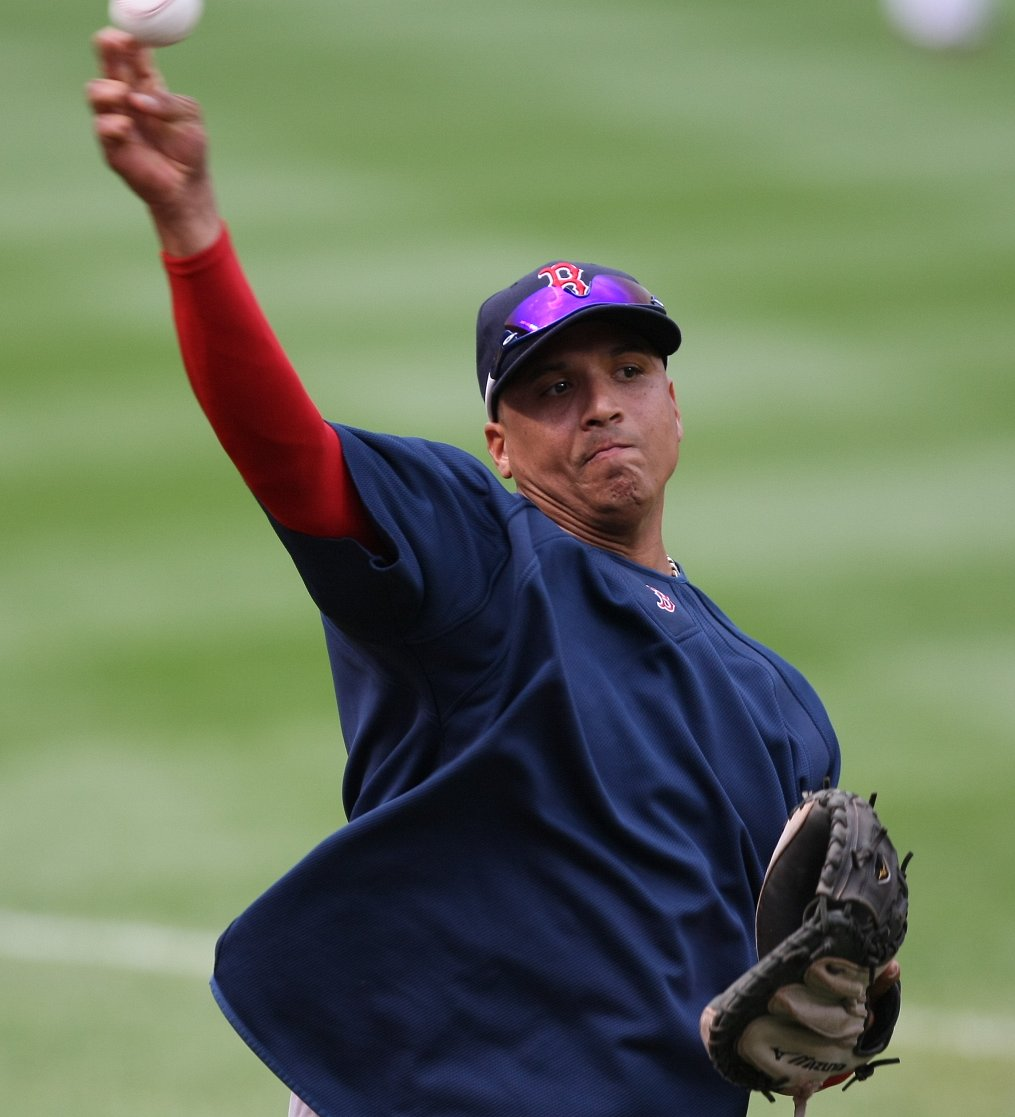
Martínez with the Boston Red Sox in 2009

==== 2009 ====
On July 31, 2009, Martínez was traded to the Boston Red Sox for Justin Masterson, Nick Hagadone, and Bryan Price. Martínez made his debut with the Red Sox on August 1, starting at first base and finishing the game 1-for-5 with an RBI single in Boston's 4–0 win over the Baltimore Orioles. In his second game on August 2, he recorded five hits and 4 RBI in an 18–10 rout of the Orioles. After joining the Red Sox, Martínez played both first base and catcher, splitting time behind the plate with Red Sox captain Jason Varitek. His combined totals for the 2009 season (with Cleveland and Boston) included a .303 batting average, 23 home runs, and 108 RBI in 155 games. He also established a career high in walks, with 75. In the 2009 American League Division Series, Martínez hit just .182 with 2 RBI as the Red Sox were swept by the Angels. Following the season, the Red Sox exercised his 2010 option for $7.1 million.

==== 2010 ====
On June 27, 2010, against the San Francisco Giants, Martínez suffered a fractured left thumb, and was placed on the 15-day disabled list. He was activated on July 26, and was placed back into the starting lineup for Boston's game against the Angels that night, hitting an RBI single in his first at-bat. He was limited to 127 games, finishing the 2010 season with a .302 batting average, 20 home runs, and 79 RBI. He was also named to his fourth career All-Star Game.

=== Detroit Tigers (2011–18) ===
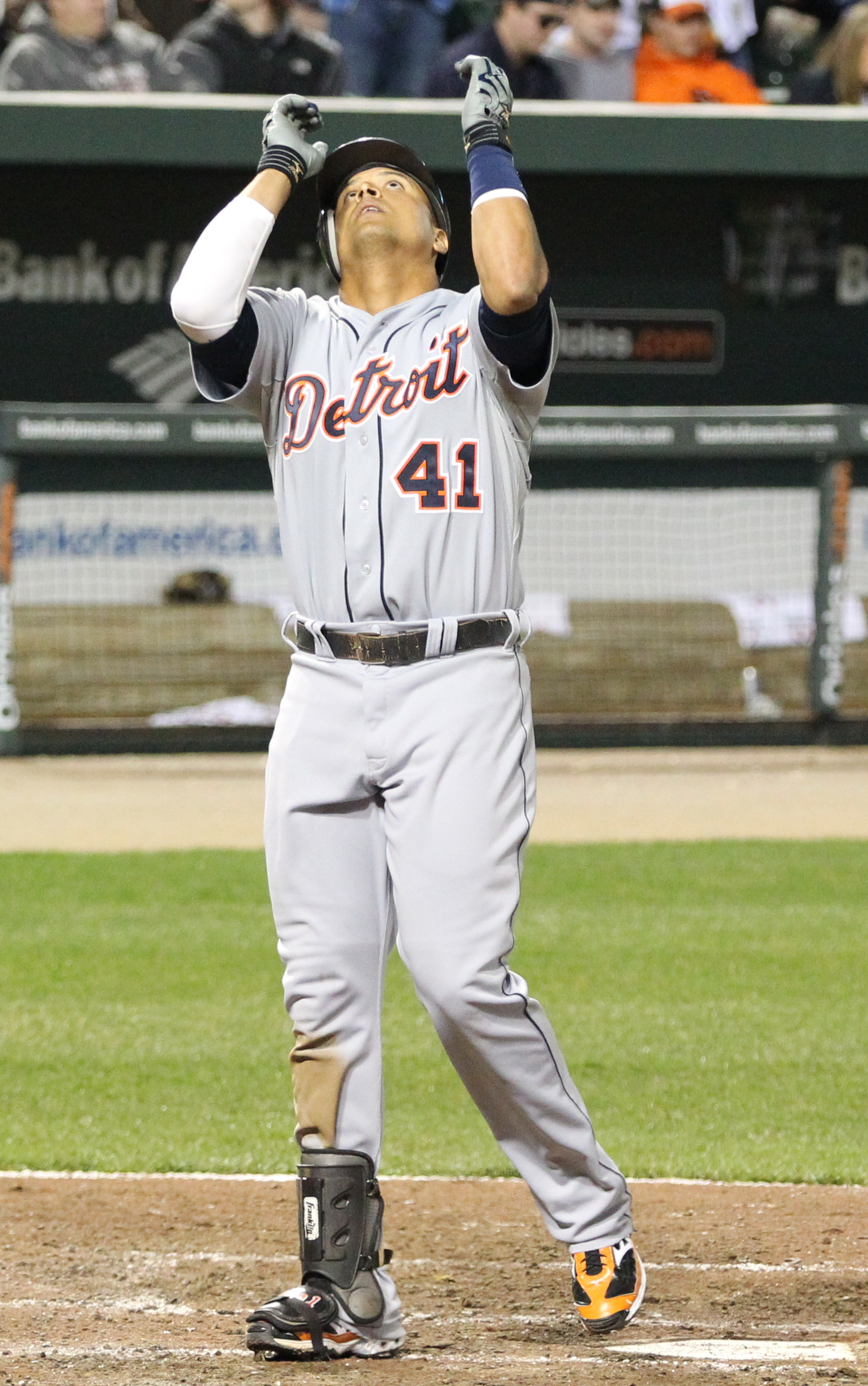
Martínez with the Tigers in 2011

==== 2011 ====
On November 23, 2010, Martínez and the Detroit Tigers organization reached an agreement on a four-year, $50 million free agent contract. On March 31, 2011, Martínez made his debut for the Tigers as a designated hitter against the New York Yankees, going 1-for-4 in the 6–3 loss. Martínez was used almost exclusively as a designated hitter for the 2011 season, playing only 26 games at catcher and six games at first base. He had a slow start to the season, batting .250 in the month of April with two home runs, but he then batted .337 in May and .370 in June. On September 11, in a game at home against the Minnesota Twins, he had perhaps his worst-ever game at the plate, going 0-for-4 and hitting into four double plays (three of them GIDPs, one a line drive); his team managed to win anyway, 2–1. It was the first time a batter had hit into four double plays in the American League since Hall of Famer Goose Goslin did so in 1934, also while playing for the Tigers, and also in a game the Tigers won, 4–1. Although his power numbers were down, with only 12 home runs all season, Martínez posted his best career batting average (.330, good for fourth-best in the American League), tied his career high with 40 doubles, and had his fourth career 100+ RBI season (103, tied for 10th in the AL). He also led the Major Leagues in batting average with runners in scoring position, hitting .394. In the 2011 postseason, Martínez batted .250 with two home runs, a triple, 5 RBI and five walks in 11 games, helping the Tigers to the ALCS. The Tigers would lose the series to the Texas Rangers in six games.

==== 2012 ====
Martínez tore his ACL during off-season training in Lakeland, Florida and missed the entire 2012 season. On March 12, Martínez was placed on the 60-day disabled list. On June 22, owner Mike Ilitch optimistically reported that Martínez's rehab was progressing better than expected, and speculated that he might rejoin the Tigers in August or September. However, on August 17, athletic trainer Kevin Rand officially announced that Martínez would in fact not return for the 2012 season, and that his rehab would instead target a return in 2013.

==== 2013 ====
Martínez started slowly in 2013. Through the end of June, he was hitting just .232. From July 1 onward, however, he hit at a .367 clip, contributing to a final line of .301, 14 home runs and 83 RBI in 159 games. It marked the sixth season that Martínez topped .300, and he also set career highs in hits (182) and at-bats (605). He continued to play well in the 2013 postseason, batting .405 with four doubles, a home run and 5 RBI in 11 games, but the Tigers eventually lost the ALCS in six games to the Boston Red Sox.

==== 2014 ====
Entering the 2014 season, new Tigers manager Brad Ausmus indicated that he wanted Martínez to be prepared to catch, particularly during interleague games in a National League ballpark where there is no designated hitter. Martínez had the best statistical year of his career in 2014, setting career highs in several hitting categories.

On April 23, 2014, Martínez singled in the ninth inning of a game against the Chicago White Sox for his 1,500th career hit. On July 6, Martínez was selected in the player voting to participate in his fifth AL All-Star game, and his first as a Tiger. Martínez did not participate in the All-Star game due to side soreness, and was replaced by teammate Ian Kinsler. In a game against the New York Yankees on August 27, Martínez hit his 26th home run of the 2014 season, establishing a new career high. His previous high mark was 25 home runs for the Cleveland Indians in 2007.

Martínez was named the American League Player of the Month for August 2014. Martínez tied for the Major League lead in hits with 41 in the month, along with a .350 batting average in 31 games. Martínez slugged at a .547 clip in August, hitting six home runs and driving in a league-leading 30 runs. He also had 14 multi-hit games and was third in the AL in on-base percentage (.442) thanks to 19 walks.

Martínez finished the 2014 regular season with a career-high .335 batting average (second-best in the American League), 33 doubles and 103 RBI, while setting career highs with 188 hits and 32 home runs. He led the major leagues in OPS (.974) and intentional walks (28), and also led the American League with a .409 on-base percentage. Victor led the Tigers with 70 walks, and struck out only 42 times. He became the third player since 1990 to have 30 or more home runs, and 42 or fewer strikeouts, following Barry Bonds in 2004 and Gary Sheffield in 1992, and the first Tiger to do so since 1901. Martínez was 93-for-276 with two strikes, a .337 average, the second best two-strike average since 1914. On November 4, 2014, the BBWAA announced that Martínez was one of the three finalists for the American League MVP Award, along with Michael Brantley and Mike Trout. He finished second to Trout in the voting. On November 6, 2014, it was announced that Martínez won his second Silver Slugger Award, as the top-hitting American League designated hitter. Martínez was awarded the Edgar Martínez Award for 2014.

Martinez became a free agent after the 2014 season. On November 12, 2014, the Tigers re-signed Martínez to a four-year, $68 million contract.

==== 2015 ====
On February 5, 2015, it was announced that Martínez had suffered a torn medial meniscus in his left knee during offseason workouts. Martínez underwent successful surgery on his knee, and was expected to rejoin the team by the start of the regular season. Martínez did start the season, but reaggravated the left knee injury a couple weeks into April and began to struggle at the plate. In a game on May 18, Martínez landed clumsily at first base while running out a ground ball, tweaking the knee again. The Tigers put him on the 15-day disabled list the next day. At the time, he was hitting .216 with just four extra-base hits (three doubles, one home run) in 111 at-bats. He hit particularly poorly from the left side (.141 average in 85 at-bats), being unable to put weight on his back knee without pain. Martínez returned to the Tiger lineup on June 19 in a game against the New York Yankees.

On September 23, 2015, Martínez hit his 200th career home run, against Frankie Montas of the Chicago White Sox, becoming the sixth Venezuelan to reach the milestone. The injury-marred 2015 season led to a career-low .245 batting average with 11 home runs and 64 RBI in 120 games. For the season, Martinez hit .348 as a right-handed batter, but just .219 as a left-hander. He had the slowest baserunning sprint speed of all major league players, at 22.4 feet/second.

==== 2016 ====
On April 6, 2016, Martínez became the first player in modern Major League history to hit a pinch-hit home run in his team's first two regular-season games of the season. He was the first player to do so since at least 1914, and the only player to achieve this feat hitting one home run from each side of the plate. On April 20, Martínez recorded his 1,000th career RBI, becoming the fifth Venezuelan-born player in MLB history to reach the milestone.

Martínez was named the American League Player of the Week for the week ending May 1, 2016. Martinez batted .519 (14-for-27) for the week with three home runs, five doubles, 8 RBIs and eight runs scored. It was the first Player of the Week award for Martínez since May 15, 2011, and his fifth award overall. On May 11 against the Washington Nationals during Max Scherzer's 20-strikeout game, Martínez still managed to finish the game 3-for-4. On June 16 against the Kansas City Royals, Martinez hit three home runs in a game for the second time in his career. The first two came from the right side of the plate against Royals starter Danny Duffy, and the third was hit from the left side against reliever Chien-Ming Wang. Victor's only other three-homer game came on July 16, 2004, against the Seattle Mariners. Martínez became the first Tigers player to hit a home run from each side of the plate in the same game since Carlos Guillén in 2009.

Martinez finished the 2016 season with a .289 batting average, 27 home runs and 86 RBI in 154 games. He had the slowest baserunning sprint speed of all major league players, at 22.6 feet/second.

==== 2017 ====
On June 15, 2017, Martínez was replaced with a pinch runner in the seventh inning after complaining about a fast heartbeat, dizziness, and cold sweats. He ended up hospitalized with an irregular heartbeat and was placed on the 10-day disabled list the next day.

On July 7, Martínez recorded his 2,000th career hit with a single off Carlos Carrasco of the Cleveland Indians, becoming the ninth active player to reach the milestone.

On August 27, Martínez was again placed on the 10-day disabled list due to the irregular heartbeat symptoms returning. On September 2, it was revealed that Martínez would undergo cardiovascular surgery due to his irregular heartbeat, effectively ending his 2017 season. He played in 107 games in 2017, hitting .255 with 10 home runs and 47 RBI. He had the second-slowest baserunning sprint speed of all major league players, at 22.6 feet/second.

==== 2018 ====
Having undergone successful cardiovascular surgery and treatment, Martínez participated in a full 2018 spring training and began the season as the Tigers' designated hitter. After struggling much of the 2018 season, Martínez stated on August 15 that 2018 would more than likely be his last in major league baseball. He said that he was just going to enjoy the last six weeks, and then go home to his cattle ranch in central Florida, where he now lives. The Cleveland Indians, where Martínez started his career and played for eight seasons, honored him before a game on September 15 in one of his last games in Cleveland before his announced retirement. The Tigers announced on September 19 that they would have a ceremony for him before the game on September 22. Martínez then announced that the game would be his final one so that he would take his last at-bat in front of his home crowd. After the pre-game ceremony, Martínez started the game at first base for the first time since 2016 at his request. He then beat out an infield single in his final at-bat in the bottom of the first inning, and was replaced with a pinch runner. As he walked off the field, he was greeted by teammates and two players from the Kansas City Royals gave him a hug.

In his final season, Martínez hit .251 with nine home runs and 54 RBI in 133 games. He had the slowest baserunning sprint speed of all major league designated hitters, at 23.2 feet/second. When he retired in 2018, he was seventh among active players in RBI (1,178) and intentional walks (119).

==== Career statistics ====
In 1,973 games over 16 seasons, Martinez posted a .295 batting average (2,153-for-7,297) with 914 runs, 423 doubles, 246 home runs, 1,178 RBI, 730 walks, .360 on-base percentage, and .455 slugging percentage. Defensively, he recorded an overall .993 fielding percentage playing 858 games at catcher and 214 games at first base. He was productive in postseason play, batting .315 (47-for-149) in 39 games, with 22 runs, eight doubles, six home runs, 22 RBI and 11 walks.

== Post-playing career ==
Martinez founded a 2,400-acre (970 ha) cattle operation called Victoria's Ranch at the end of his baseball career. In 2020, his horse King Guillermo won the Tampa Bay Derby at odds of 49/1.

On February 16, 2023, Martínez joined the front office of the Toronto Blue Jays as a special advisor.

== See also ==
- List of Major League Baseball career hits leaders
- List of Major League Baseball career runs batted in leaders
- List of Major League Baseball career home run leaders
- List of Major League Baseball players from Venezuela

Awards and achievements
Preceded by Billy Munoz	Indians Minor League Player of the Year (the Lou Boudreau Award); 2001, 2002	Succeeded by Grady Sizemore
