= TJ House =

American former baseball player (born 1989)

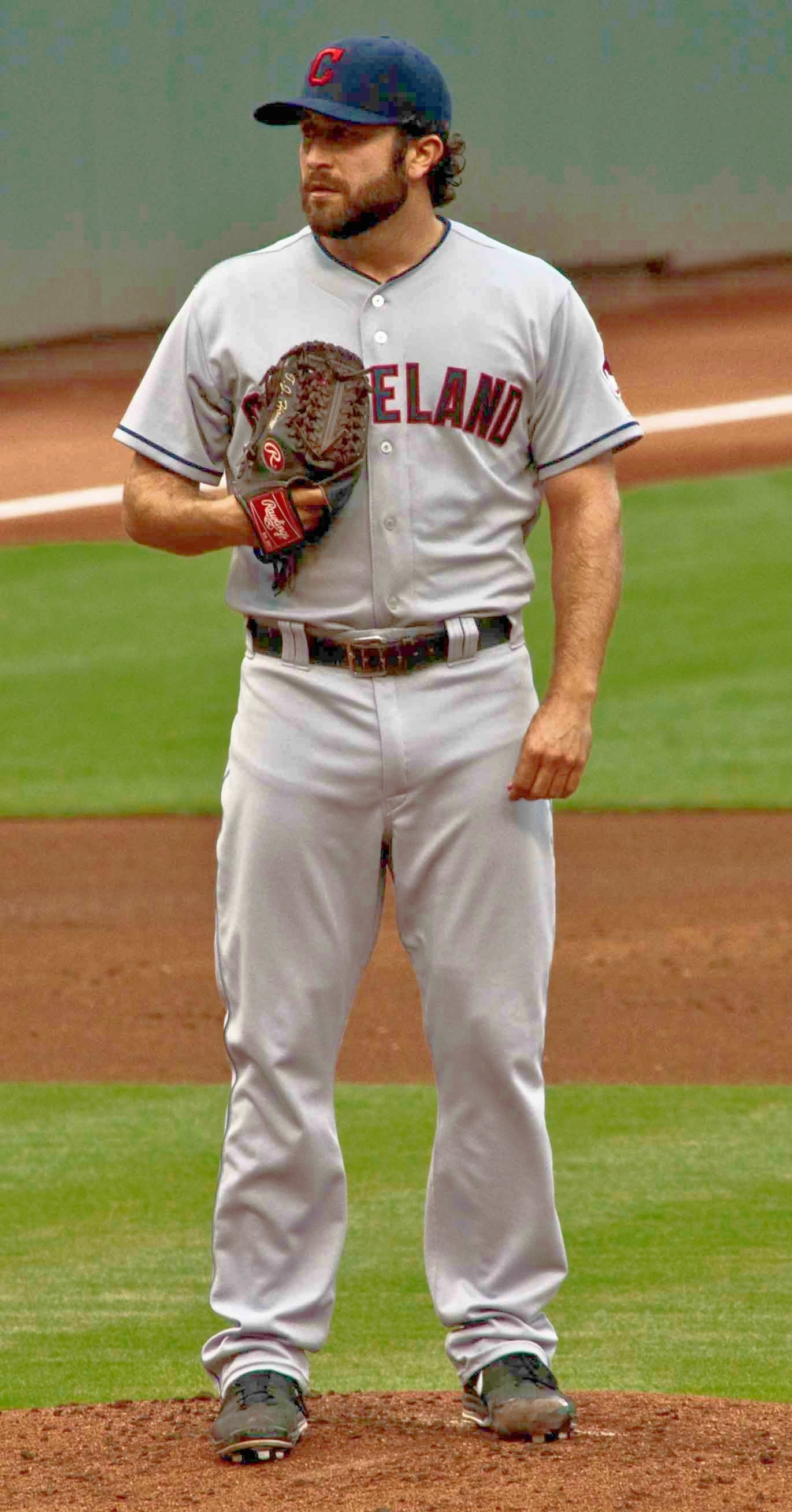
- House with the Cleveland Indians in 2014
- Pitcher
- Born: September 29, 1989 (age 36); Slidell, Louisiana, U.S.
- Batted: Right Threw: Left

MLB debut
- May 17, 2014, for the Cleveland Indians

Last MLB appearance
- August 25, 2017, for the Toronto Blue Jays

MLB statistics
- Win–loss record: 5–7
- Earned run average: 4.44
- Strikeouts: 90
- Stats at Baseball Reference

Teams
- Cleveland Indians (2014–2016); Toronto Blue Jays (2017)

Glenn Anthony "TJ" House (born September 29, 1989) is an American former professional baseball pitcher. He played in Major League Baseball (MLB) for the Cleveland Indians and Toronto Blue Jays from 2014 to 2017.

== Early life ==
House was born in Slidell, Louisiana, and moved to Picayune, Mississippi, as a child. His stepfather's family owns Liuzza's, a restaurant in the New Orleans area. While in high school, he was displaced as a result of Hurricane Katrina; his family's house flooded and a tree was blown through his bedroom.

== Career ==
=== Cleveland Indians ===
House attended Picayune Memorial High School, where he starred for his school's baseball team. The Indians drafted House in the 16th round of the 2008 MLB draft. He began his professional career with the Class-A Lake County Captains in 2009. That year, he had a win–loss record of 6–11, a 3.15 earned run average (ERA), and 109 strikeouts. He spent the next two years with the Kinston Indians, going 6–10 in 2010 and 6–12 in 2011. He was an invite to spring training in 2012, but was kept in the bullpen, and the Indians front office considered releasing him if he did not perform well the following season.

House split the 2012 season with the Carolina Mudcats and Akron Aeros. In 23 games with the Aeros, he went 8–5 with a 3.98 ERA. The Indians added him to their 40-man roster after the 2012 season. House spent the 2013 season with the Aeros and the Triple–A Columbus Clippers. The Indians promoted House from the minors on June 24, 2013. After making no appearances in any major-league games, House was optioned back to Columbus for the remainder of the season.

House spent the first 1.5 months of the 2014 season with the Clippers, going 1–4 with a 3.79 ERA and 42 strikeouts in ten games. The Indians promoted House to the major leagues on May 17, 2014, and he made his major league debut that day. For the season, he had five wins, three losses, and a 3.35 ERA in 19 appearances. House missed much of the 2015 season with left shoulder inflammation, and posted an ugly 13.15 ERA in 4 games for Cleveland.

House spent much of the 2016 season in Columbus, and also logged a 3.38 ERA in 4 major league games. House was designated for assignment by the Indians on September 20, 2016. After clearing waivers, House was outrighted to Columbus on September 27. He elected free agency following the season on November 7.

=== Toronto Blue Jays ===
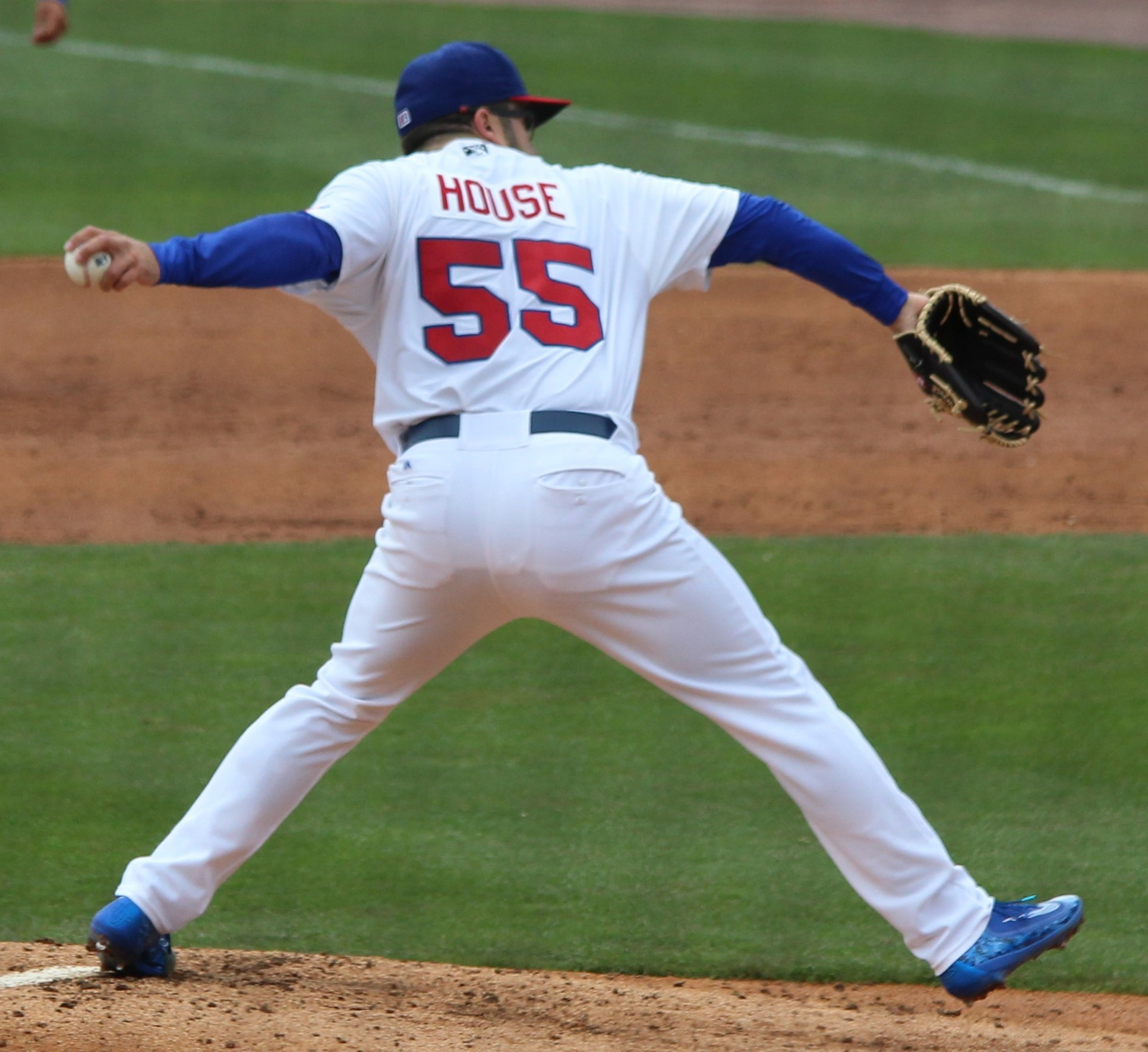
House in 2017

On December 14, 2016, House signed a minor league contract with the Toronto Blue Jays. House was struck in the head by a line drive on March 10, 2017, during a spring training game in Lakeland, Florida. He remained on the ground for many minutes being attended to by medical staff, and left the field in an ambulance. He was assigned to the Triple-A Buffalo Bisons to begin the 2017 season.

On August 19, House was called up to the major leagues by the Blue Jays. He was designated for assignment on August 27 after recording a 4.50 ERA in 2 appearances. On October 13, House elected free agency.

=== Chicago White Sox ===
On January 22, 2018, House signed a minor league contract with the Chicago White Sox organization. He was assigned to the Triple-A Charlotte Knights, but was released on June 12, 2018 after struggling to a 6.81 ERA in 9 games.

=== Milwaukee Milkmen ===
On May 13, 2019, House signed with the Milwaukee Milkmen of the independent American Association. In 17 games for the team, House pitched to a 7–9 record and 4.35 ERA with 78 strikeouts in 111 2/3 innings pitched.

=== Kansas City T-Bones ===
On August 24, 2019, House was traded to the Kansas City T-Bones of the American Association. He pitched in three games for the T-Bones, logging a 2–0 record and 3.52 ERA with 22 strikeouts in 15 1/3 innings pitched.

=== Eastern Reyes del Tigre ===
On March 3, 2020, House was traded to the Sugar Land Skeeters of the Atlantic League of Professional Baseball. However, the 2020 ALPB season was canceled due to the COVID-19 pandemic. House stayed in Sugar Land, however, and signed on to play for the Eastern Reyes del Tigre of the Constellation Energy League (a makeshift 4-team independent league created as a result of the pandemic) for the 2020 season. After recording a 3.38 ERA and 1–2 record in 7 games, he became a free agent after the year.

== Personal life ==
House came out as gay on December 8, 2022, announcing his engagement to his boyfriend, Ryan Neitzel. They were married on March 29, 2024.
