= Nick Hagadone =

American baseball player (born 1986)

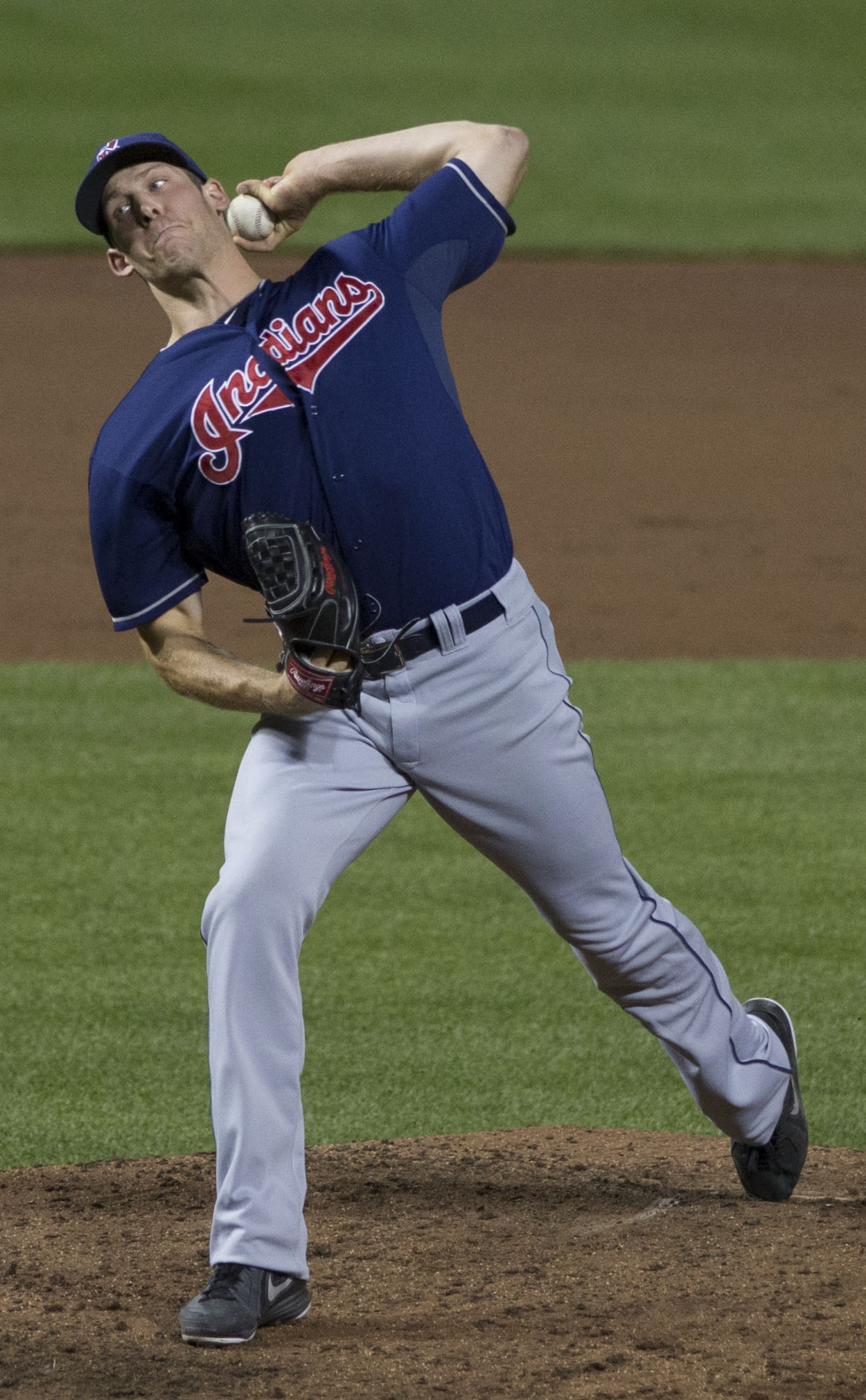
- Hagadone with the Cleveland Indians
- Pitcher
- Born: January 1, 1986 (age 40); Sandpoint, Idaho, U.S.
- Batted: Left Threw: Left

MLB debut
- September 1, 2011, for the Cleveland Indians

Last MLB appearance
- July 6, 2015, for the Cleveland Indians

MLB statistics
- Win–loss record: 3–2
- Earned run average: 4.72
- Strikeouts: 122
- Stats at Baseball Reference

Teams
- Cleveland Indians (2011–2015)

Nicholas Michael Hagadone (born January 1, 1986) is an American former professional baseball pitcher. He played in Major League Baseball (MLB) for the Cleveland Indians.

He was selected by the Seattle Mariners in the 2004 Major League Baseball draft but didn't sign, instead opting to go to Bellevue Community College and later the University of Washington. He was later selected by the Boston Red Sox with their first pick, 55th overall, in the 2007 Major League Baseball draft. He was rated by Baseball America as the 60th best prospect for the 2007 Draft.

== Amateur career ==
=== High school ===
Hagadone graduated from Sumner High School in Sumner, Washington, a suburb southeast of Seattle.

=== College ===
Hagadone originally planned to attend Bellevue Community College but later received a scholarship to the University of Washington in Seattle. During his time as a Husky, he was the primary closer and teammates with future Cy Young Award winner Tim Lincecum. On March 12, 2006 Lincecum and Hagadone teamed up for a no-hitter, the first for the Huskies since 1978.

He was named First-Team All-Pac-10 his junior season in 2007 after going 6–1 with 11 saves and a 2.77 ERA in 25 games, two starts for the UW. He had 72 strikeouts in 68 1/3 innings, an average of 9.5 strikeouts per nine innings and limited opposing hitters to a .235 average. He began the season as a starter but spent most of the year as the Huskies' closer. He was the only Husky to earn First-Team honors in 2007. He said this about his time at UW:

I have really enjoyed my career at the UW. Coach [Ken] Knutson taught me everything I know about pitching, and I know that I would not be where I am today without the time that I have spent here. I am disappointed that we never made it to post-season play in my three years, but it was still a great experience anyway.

== Professional career ==
=== Boston Red Sox ===
Hagadone reported to the Lowell Spinners of the Low-A New York–Penn League after signing his first professional contract with the Boston Red Sox on July 1, 2007. He set a franchise record by twirling 23 consecutive scoreless innings to finish the season, breaking Matt Kinney's mark of 18 innings in 1996. He was roughed up in his pro debut, allowing five runs on six hits and a walk while fanning one over one and one third innings against the Aberdeen IronBirds on July 18. He said this about his pro debut:

My first pro outing definitely didn't go the way that I wanted it to go, I didn't even make it through my two innings before getting pulled out. I was very disappointed with my performance. I was a little nervous, but it was just one of those days where they hit pretty much anything that I threw up there, and when I made mistakes I got hurt. Since then, I have just tried to forget about it and make adjustments to the way that I go after the hitters and what pitches I throw them in certain situations.

Hagadone held opposing hitters to a .103 average and just one extra-base hit, a double, during his scoreless streak for the rest of 2007. He struck out at least one batter in each of his 10 starts and averaged 12.2 punchouts per 9 innings. His 1.85 ERA led all Spinners hurlers with at least 20 innings pitched.

In 2008, Hagadone made three starts in his first full pro season at Single-A Greenville Drive of the South Atlantic League before being placed on the disabled list on April 19 and missing the rest of the season as the result of Tommy John surgery. He did not allow an earned run in 10 innings of work with the Drive, fanning 12 and allowing only five hits and three unearned runs. He gave up two unearned runs in his first inning of the season on April 5 against the Kannapolis Intimidators, snapping a personal 23-inning scoreless streak. He made his last start on April 16 against the Greensboro Grasshoppers, leaving the game following two and one third shutout innings.

Following the 2008 season, Hagadone was ranked by Baseball America as the Red Sox's number three prospect and the number two pitcher. He was also rated as having the best slider in the system for two straight seasons in 2007 and 2008.

=== Cleveland Indians ===
On July 31, 2009, Hagadone, Justin Masterson, and Bryan Price were traded to the Cleveland Indians in exchange for Víctor Martínez. He made 7 starts down the stretch, splitting time between the Single-A Lake County Captains and High-A Kinston Indians.

Hagadone split the 2010 season between Kinston and the Double-A Akron Aeros. In 29 appearances (17 starts) for the two affiliates, he compiled a 3-5 record and 3.57 ERA with 89 strikeouts across 85 2/3 innings pitched. On November 19, 2010, Hagadone was added to the Indians' 40-man roster to protect him from the Rule 5 draft.

Hagadone was called up to the Indians on August 26, 2011. In nine appearances for the Indians during his rookie campaign, Hagadone logged a 1-0 record and 4.09 ERA with 11 strikeouts over 11 innings of work.

In a loss versus the Tampa Bay Rays on July 6, 2012, Hagadone fractured his left forearm in a fit of frustration. The injury required a metal screw to be inserted during surgery and recovery was expected to take 6–8 weeks. Said Indians manager Manny Acta, "I think Nick learned his lesson. A big part of this game is learning how to control your emotions." Hagadone was subsequently placed on the minor league disqualified list. He made 27 appearances for Cleveland during the 2012 season, struggling to an 6.39 ERA with 26 strikeouts and one saves across 25 1/3 innings pitched.

Hagadone made 36 appearances for the Indians during the 2013 campaign, posting an 0-1 record and 5.46 ERA with 30 strikeouts across 31 1/3 innings pitched. In 2014, Hagadone finished 1–0 with a 2.70 ERA and 27 strikeouts in 23 1/3 innings of relief over 35 games.

Hagadone made 36 appearances out of the bullpen for Cleveland in 2015, recording a 4.28 ERA with 28 strikeouts across 27 1/3 innings pitched. Hagadone was designated for assignment following the acquisition of Collin Cowgill on December 2, 2015. As that date was also the non-tender deadline that year, and the Indians did not tender him a contract, and Hagadone subsequently became a free agent.

On December 18, 2015, Hagadone signed a minor league contract with the Milwaukee Brewers organization. However, the deal was voided on January 11, 2016, due to "significant issues" that arose in his physical. He did not pitch professionally in 2016.

=== Seattle Mariners ===
On January 31, 2017, Hagadone signed a minor league contract with the Seattle Mariners. He made 28 appearances out of the bullpen for the Triple-A Tacoma Rainiers, posting a 3-3 record and 3.51 ERA with 35 strikeouts across 33 1/3 innings pitched. Hagadone was released by the Mariners organization on July 1.

== Scouting report ==
Hagadone's four-seam fastball is approximately 92–95 miles per hour and tops out at about 98 miles per hour. He also has a two-seam fastball with similar velocity.
