= 1912 Cleveland Naps season =

1912 Cleveland Naps
- League: American League
- Ballpark: League Park II
- City: Cleveland, Ohio
- Record: 75–78 (.490)
- League place: 5th
- Owners: Charles Somers
- Managers: Harry Davis, Joe Birmingham

The 1912 Cleveland Naps season was a season in American baseball. The Naps had two of the best hitters in the majors in Shoeless Joe Jackson and Nap Lajoie. Despite this, they ended up back in the second division, finishing in fifth place with a record of 75–78.

== Regular season ==
- April 20, 1912: The Naps played in the first ever game at Navin Field in Detroit against Ty Cobb's Detroit Tigers. Navin Field, later known as Tiger Stadium, opened the same day as Fenway Park. It was supposed to have opened on April 18 (like Fenway Park) but it rained in both cities on that day. Naps batter Shoeless Joe Jackson scored the first run ever at Navin Field, though the Tigers would win the game 6–5. Although Jackson would go on to hit a team leading .395 for the season including 3 home runs and 90 RBI's, he finished second in batting average to Ty Cobb who hit .409 for the year.

=== Season standings ===
American League
Team	W	L	Pct.	GB	Home	Road
Boston Red Sox	105	47	.691	—	57‍–‍20	48‍–‍27
Washington Senators	91	61	.599	14	45‍–‍32	46‍–‍29
Philadelphia Athletics	90	62	.592	15	45‍–‍31	45‍–‍31
Chicago White Sox	78	76	.506	28	34‍–‍43	44‍–‍33
Cleveland Naps	75	78	.490	30½	41‍–‍35	34‍–‍43
Detroit Tigers	69	84	.451	36½	37‍–‍39	32‍–‍45
St. Louis Browns	53	101	.344	53	27‍–‍50	26‍–‍51
New York Highlanders	50	102	.329	55	31‍–‍44	19‍–‍58

=== Record vs. opponents ===
1912 American League record Sources:
Team	BOS	CWS	CLE	DET	NYH	PHA	SLB	WSH
Boston	—	16–6–1	11–11–1	15–6	19–2	15–7	17–5	12–10
Chicago	6–16–1	—	11–11	14–8–1	13–9	12–10	13–9–2	9–13
Cleveland	11–11–1	11–11	—	13–9	13–8–1	8–14	15–7	4–18
Detroit	6–15	8–14–1	9–13	—	16–6	9–13	13–9	8–14
New York	2–19	9–13	8–13–1	6–16	—	5–17	13–9	7–15
Philadelphia	7–15	10–12	14–8	13–9	17–5	—	16–6	13–7–1
St. Louis	5–17	9–13–2	7–15	9–13	9–13	6–16	—	8–14–1
Washington	10–12	13–9	18–4	14–8	15–7	7–13–1	14–8–1	—

=== Roster ===
1912 Cleveland Naps
Roster
Pitchers: Jim Baskette; Fred Blanding; Bert Brenner; Lefty George; Vean Gregg; Bill James; Lefty James; George Kahler; Gene Krapp; Harry Krause; Willie Mitchell; Jim Neher; Bill Steen; Mysterious Walker; Roy Walker; Ernie Wolf	Catchers: Bert Adams; Fred Carisch; Ted Easterly; Paddy Livingston; Lou Nagelsen; Steve O'Neill; Infielders: Howard Baker; Neal Ball; Herman Bronkie; Ray Chapman; Harry Davis; Art Griggs; Eddie Hohnhorst; Doc Johnston; Jack Kibble; Nap Lajoie; Ken Nash; Ivy Olson; Roger Peckinpaugh; Terry Turner	Outfielders: Joe Birmingham; Hank Butcher; Hack Eibel; Jack Graney; Harvey Grubb; Art Hauger; Tim Hendryx; Bill Hunter; Joe Jackson; Moxie Meixell; Buddy Ryan	Manager: Harry Davis; Joe Birmingham

== Player stats ==
=== Batting ===
==== Starters by position ====
Note: Pos = Position; G = Games played; AB = At bats; H = Hits; Avg. = Batting average; HR = Home runs; RBI = Runs batted in

Pos	Player	G	AB	H	Avg.	HR	RBI
C	Steve O'Neill	69	215	49	.228	0	14
1B	Art Griggs	89	273	83	.304	0	39
2B	Nap Lajoie	117	448	165	.368	0	90
3B	Terry Turner	103	370	114	.308	0	33
SS	Roger Peckinpaugh	70	236	50	.212	1	22
OF	Buddy Ryan	93	328	89	.271	1	31
OF	Joe Birmingham	107	369	94	.255	1	45
OF	Joe Jackson	154	572	226	.395	3	90

==== Other batters ====
Note: G = Games played; AB = At bats; H = Hits; Avg. = Batting average; HR = Home runs; RBI = Runs batted in

Player	G	AB	H	Avg.	HR	RBI
Ivy Olson	125	467	118	.253	0	33
Jack Graney	78	264	64	.242	0	20
Ted Easterly	65	186	55	.296	2	21
Doc Johnston	43	164	46	.280	1	11
Neal Ball	40	132	30	.227	0	14
Ray Chapman	31	109	34	.312	0	19
Hank Butcher	26	82	16	.195	1	10
Tim Hendryx	23	70	17	.243	1	14
Fred Carisch	24	69	19	.275	0	5
Bill Hunter	21	55	9	.164	0	2
Bert Adams	20	54	11	.204	0	6
Eddie Hohnhorst	15	54	11	.204	0	2
Paddy Livingston	20	47	11	.234	0	3
Howard Baker	11	30	5	.167	0	2
Ken Nash	11	23	4	.174	0	0
Art Hauger	15	18	1	.056	0	0
Herman Bronkie	6	16	0	.000	0	0
Jack Kibble	5	8	0	.000	0	0
Harry Davis	2	5	0	.000	0	0
Lou Nagelsen	2	3	0	.000	0	0
Hack Eibel	1	3	0	.000	0	0
Moxie Meixell	3	2	1	.500	0	0
Harvey Grubb	1	0	0	----	0	0

=== Pitching ===
==== Starting pitchers ====
Note: G = Games pitched; IP = Innings pitched; W = Wins; L = Losses; ERA = Earned run average; SO = Strikeouts

Player	G	IP	W	L	ERA	SO
Vean Gregg	37	271.2	20	13	2.59	184
Fred Blanding	39	262.0	18	14	2.92	75
George Kahler	41	246.1	12	19	3.69	104
Gene Krapp	9	58.2	2	5	4.60	22
Harry Krause	2	4.2	0	1	11.57	1

==== Other pitchers ====
Note: G = Games pitched; IP = Innings pitched; W = Wins; L = Losses; ERA = Earned run average; SO = Strikeouts

Player	G	IP	W	L	ERA	SO
Willie Mitchell	29	163.2	5	8	2.80	94
Bill Steen	26	143.1	9	8	3.77	61
Jim Baskette	29	116.0	8	4	3.18	51
Lefty George	11	44.1	0	5	4.87	18
Bert Brenner	2	13.0	1	0	2.77	3
Lefty James	3	6.0	0	1	7.50	2

==== Relief pitchers ====
Note: G = Games pitched; W = Wins; L = Losses; SV = Saves; ERA = Earned run average; SO = Strikeouts

Player	G	W	L	SV	ERA	SO
Bill James	3	0	0	0	4.61	5
Ernie Wolf	1	0	0	0	6.35	1
Roy Walker	1	0	0	0	0.00	1
Jim Neher	1	0	0	0	0.00	0
Mysterious Walker	1	0	0	0	0.00	0

== Awards and honors ==
=== League top five finishers ===
Vean Gregg

- #4 in AL in strikeouts (184)

Shoeless Joe Jackson

- MLB leader in hits (226)
- #2 in AL in batting average (.395)
- #2 in AL in on-base percentage (.458)
- #2 in AL in slugging percentage (.579)
- #3 in AL in runs scored (121)

George Kahler

- AL leader in walks allowed (121)
- #2 in AL in losses (19)
- #3 in AL in earned runs allowed (101)

Nap Lajoie

- #4 in AL in batting average (.368)
