= 1910 Portland Beavers season =

1910 Portland Beavers
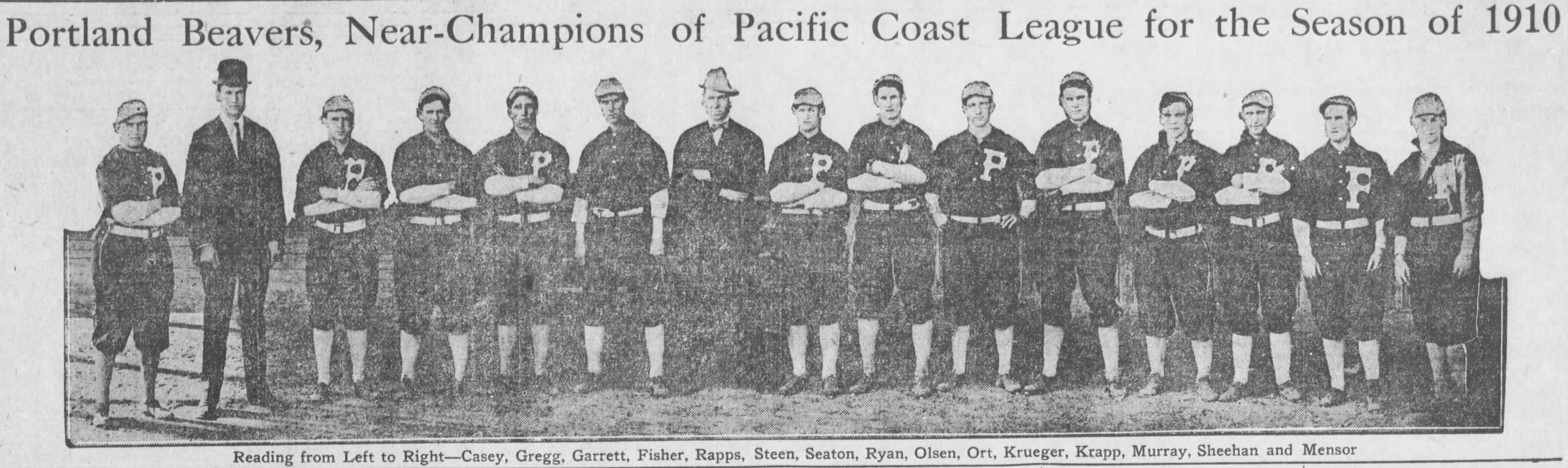
- 1910 Portland Beavers
- League: Pacific Coast League
- Ballpark: Vaughn Street Park
- City: Portland, Oregon
- Record: 114–87
- League place: 1st
- Owners: William Wallace McCredie
- Managers: Walt McCredie

The 1910 Portland Beavers season was the eighth season in the history of the Portland Beavers baseball team. The team compiled a 114–87 record and won the Pacific Coast League (PCL) pennant by one-and-a-half games over the Oakland Oaks. The Beavers won five PCL pennants between 1906 and 1914.

Walt McCredie was the team's player-manager, and shortstop Pearl Casey was the team captain. Pitchers Gene Krapp and Vean Gregg finished first and second in the PCL in both strikeouts and earned run average (ERA).

== Management ==
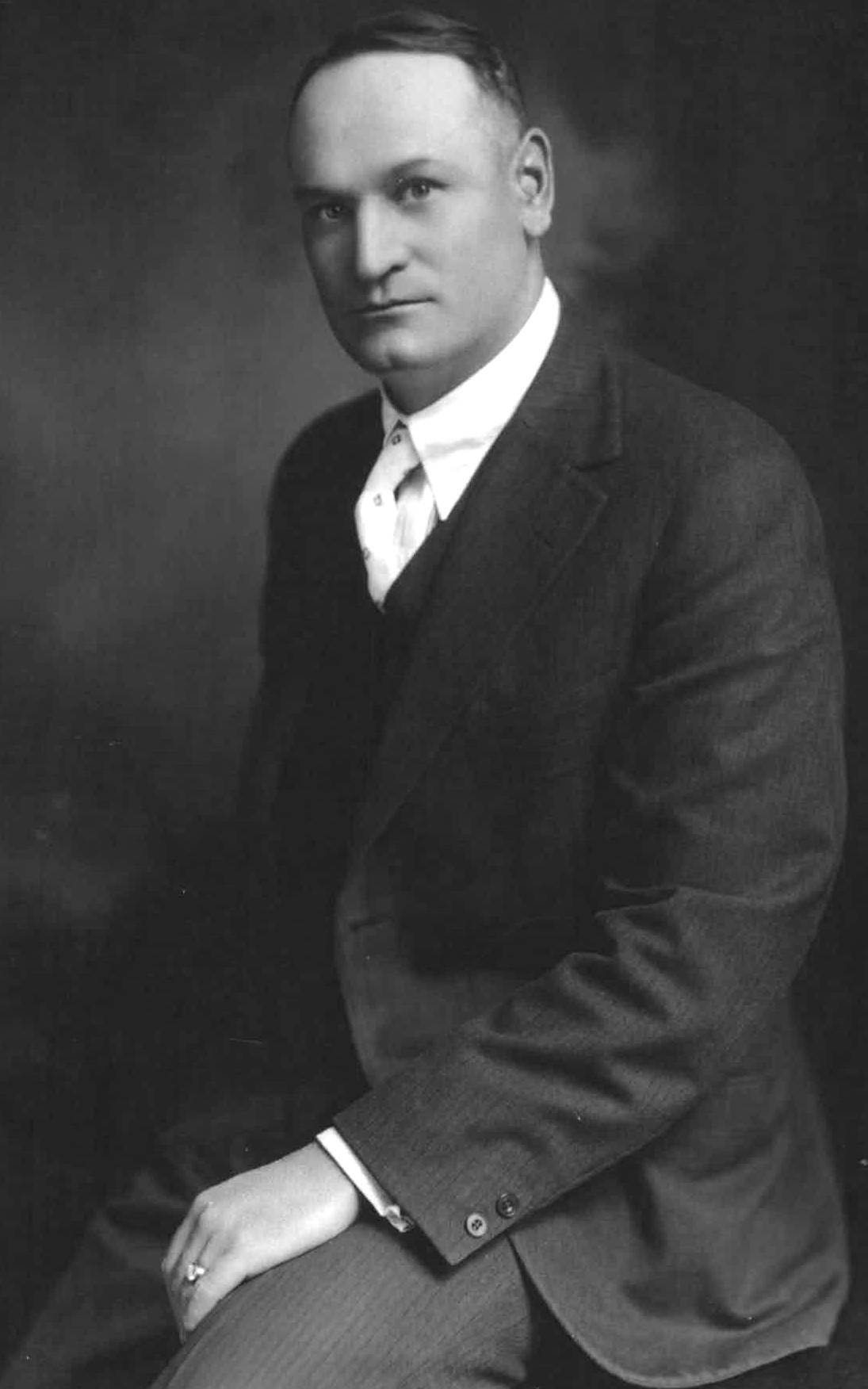
Walt McCredie

The team was owned by Judge William Wallace McCredie, who later represented the State of Washington in the U.S. House of Representatives. McCredie also served as the club's president while his son, Hugh, was the business manager and his wife, Alice, managed the ticket office. His nephew Walt McCredie played in the National League, batting .324 in 1903, but joined the Portland club as player-manager in 1904 after his uncle became the owner. Walt McCredie was both the manager and appeared in 61 games, mostly in right field. Shortstop Pearl Casey was the team captain.

== Pitchers ==
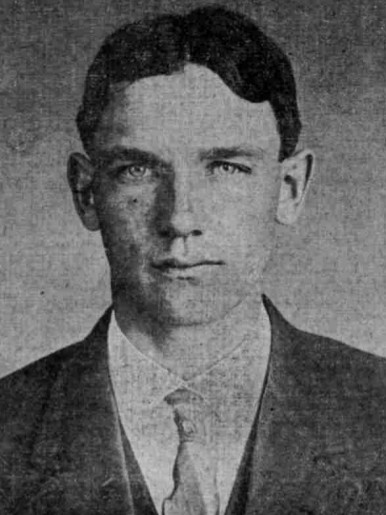
Vean Gregg

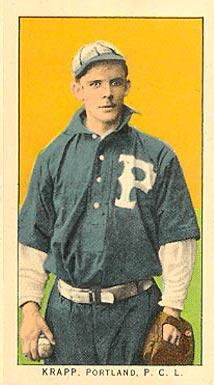
Gene Krapp

The pitching staff was the strength of the 1910 Beavers team.

Vean Gregg, a native of Chehalis, Washington, appeared in 53 games (383-1/3 innings) and compiled a 32–18 record. He led the PCL with 373 strikeouts and ranked second in the league with a 1.53 earned run average (ERA) and 32 wins.

Gene Krapp, a New York native, appeared in 54 games (442 innings) and compiled a 29–16 record. He led the PCL with a 1.26 ERA and ranked second in the league with 265 strikeouts.

Bill Steen, a Pittsburgh native, appeared in 54 games (414-2/3 innings) and compiled a 27–17 record with 188 strikeouts.

Nebraska native Tom Seaton appeared in 52 games and compiled a 17–17 record with a 1.99 ERA.

== Infielders ==
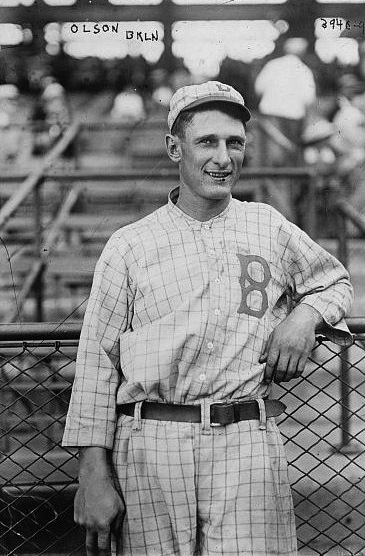
Ivy Olson

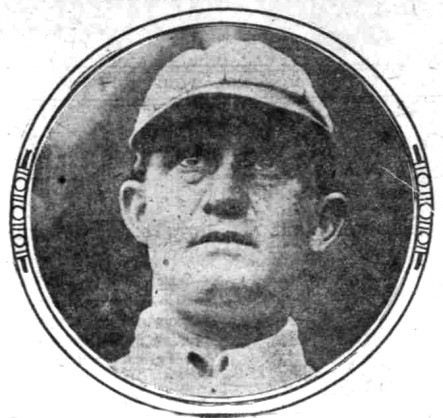
Tommy Sheehan

First baseman Bill Rapps, a Missouri native, appeared in 207 games and compiled a .236 batting average with 31 stolen bases, 32 doubles, nine triples, and three home runs.

Second baseman and team captain Pearl Casey appeared in 177 games and compiled a .241 batting average with 22 doubles and four triples.

Shortstop Ivy Olson appeared in a team-high 210 games, led the team with 39 stolen bases, and compiled a .237 batting average with 25 doubles and four triples.

The third base position was shared between Gus Hetling (.234 batting average in 86 games) and Sacramento native Tommy Sheehan (.201 batting average in 110 games).

Catcher Gus Fisher appeared in 163 games, led the team with a .382 slugging percentage and tallied 31 doubles, eight triples, and five home runs.

== Outfielders ==
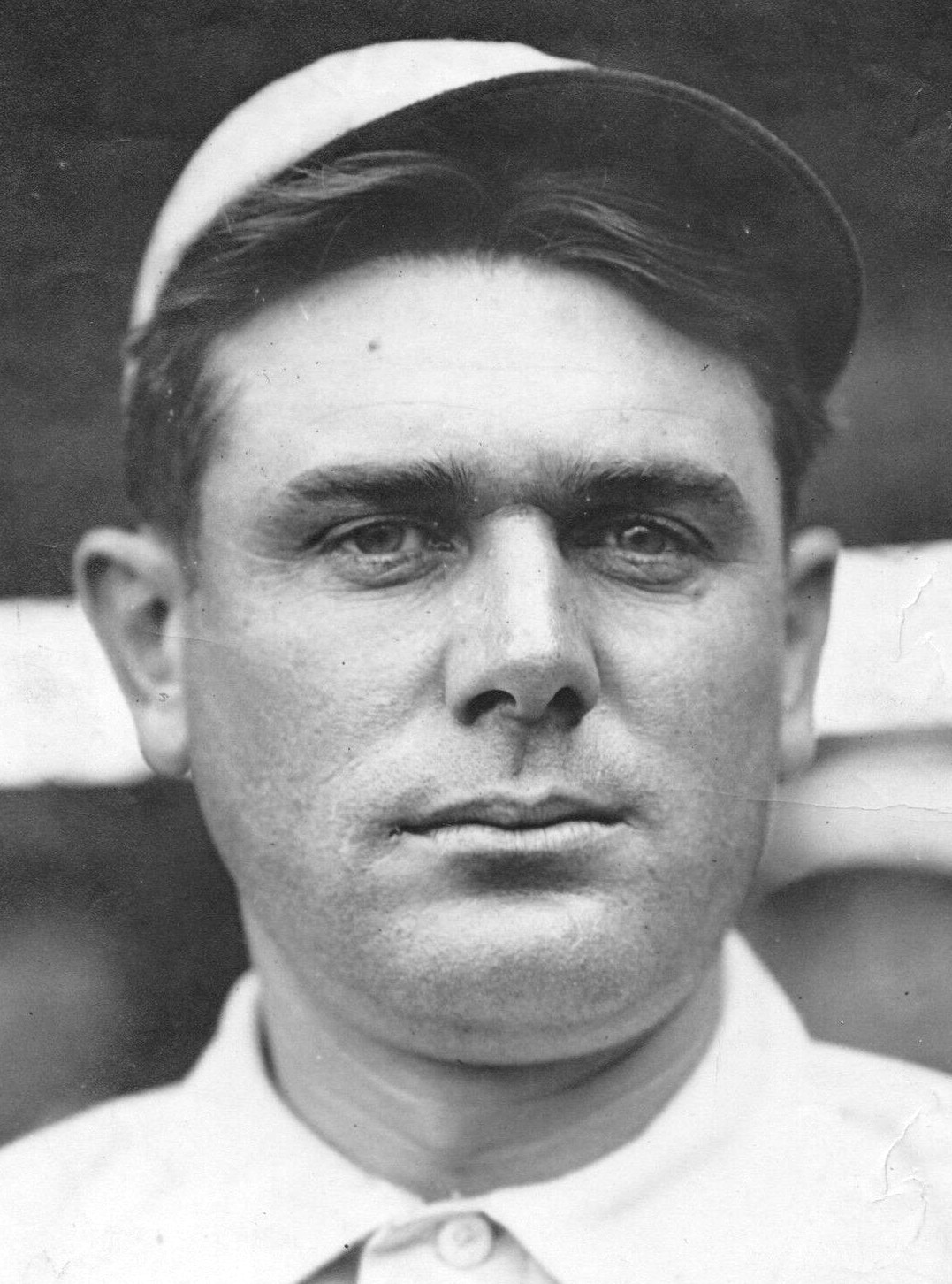
Art Kruger

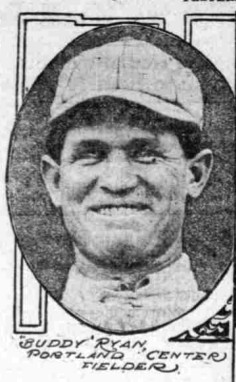
Buddy Ryan

Center fielder Buddy Ryan, a Denver native, anchored the outfield. Appearing in 206 games, he compiled a .242 batting average and led the team with 190 hits and 13 home runs.

Art Kruger appeared in 63 games in left field and center field. His .281 batting average was identical to batting champion Hunky Shaw, but Shaw was awarded the batting title as he had more than double Kruger's at bats.

Bill Speas appeared in 151 games, principally in left field and center field. He compiled a .200 batting average and stole 22 bases.

George Ort appeared in 151 games, principally in right field and at second base. He compiled a .213 batting average.

Felix Martinke, a native of Germany, was purchased by Portland from the Vernon Tigers on June 19, 1910. Player-manager McCredie said at the time he would play Martinke in right field, allowing McCredie to "retire to the bench" and devote his full time to managing the team. During his combined time with Vernon and Portland, Martinke appeared in 101 games and compiled a .230 batting average.

== 1910 PCL standings ==
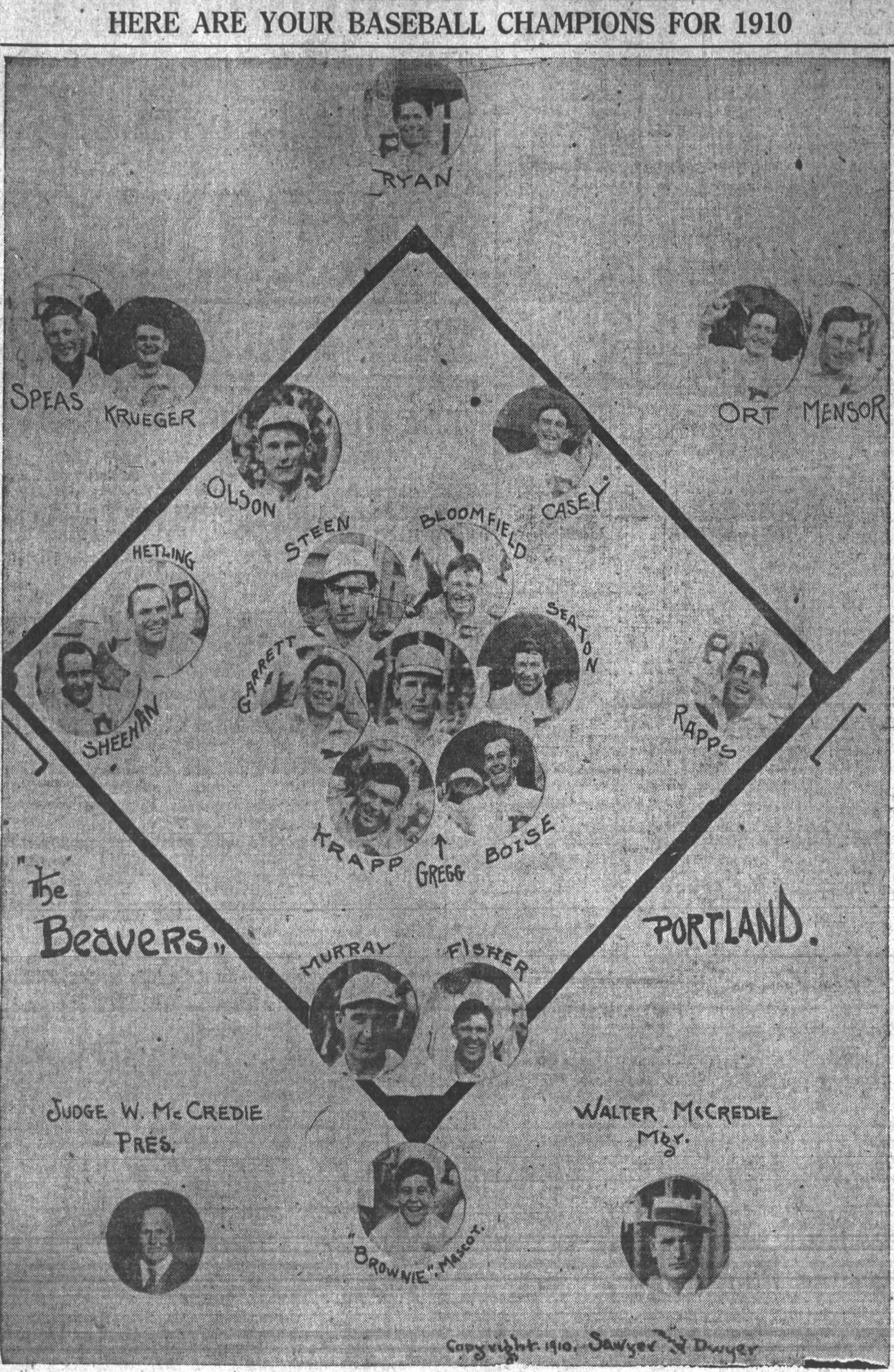
1910 Portland Beavers

Team	W	L	Pct.	GB
Portland Beavers	114	87	.567	--
Oakland Oaks	122	98	.555	1.5
San Francisco Seals	114	106	.518	9.5
Vernon Tigers	113	107	.514	10.5
Los Angeles Angels	101	121	.455	23.5
Sacramento Sacts	83	128	.393	36.0

== Statistics ==
=== Batting ===
Note: Pos = Position; G = Games played; AB = At bats; H = Hits; Avg. = Batting average; HR = Home runs; SLG = Slugging percentage; SB = Stolen bases

Pos	Player	G	AB	H	Avg.	HR	SLG	SB
LF, CF	Art Kruger	63	231	65	.281	0	.359	14
C	Gus Fisher	163	537	143	.266	5	.382	13
CF, LF	Buddy Ryan	206	784	190	.242	13	.348	25
2B	Pearl Casey	177	569	137	.241	0	.293	10
SS	Ivy Olson	210	798	189	.237	1	.282	39
1B	Bill Rapps	207	703	166	.236	3	.320	31
	Felix Martinke	101	356	82	.230	2		20
3B	Gus Hetling	86	290	68	.234	0	.293	6
RF	Walt McCredie	61	166	36	.217	0	.247	0
RF, 2B	George Ort	151	469	100	.213	0	.267	17
3B	Tommy Sheehan	110	348	70	.201	0	.241	13
LF, CF	Bill Speas	151	505	101	.200	1	.250	22
C	Tommy Murray	71	199	32	.161	0	.181	3

=== Pitching ===
Note: G = Games pitched; IP = Innings pitched; W = Wins; L = Losses; PCT = Win percentage; ERA = Earned run average

Player	G	IP	W	L	PCT	ERA	SO
Vean Gregg	53	383.1	32	18	.640	1.53	373
Gene Krapp	54	442.0	29	16	.644	1.26	265
Bill Steen	54	414.2	27	17	.614	1.78	188
Tom Seaton	52	343.0	17	17	.500	1.99	121
Jess Garrett	41	242.2	11	14	.440	1.85	101
