= 1911 Portland Beavers season =

1911 Portland Beavers
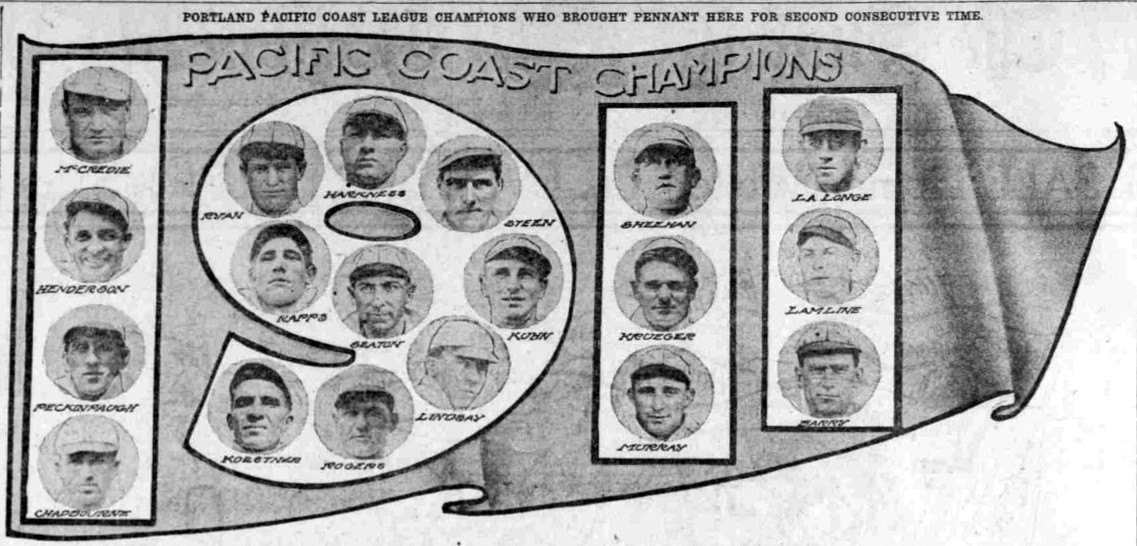
- 1911 Portland Beavers
- League: Pacific Coast League
- Ballpark: Vaughn Street Park
- City: Portland, Oregon
- Record: 113–79
- League place: 1st
- Owners: William Wallace McCredie
- Managers: Walt McCredie

The 1911 Portland Beavers season was the ninth season in the history of the Portland Beavers baseball team. Under the leadership of manager Walt McCredie, the team compiled a 113–79 record and won the Pacific Coast League (PCL) pennant. The Beavers won five PCL pennants between 1906 and 1914.

== Outfielders ==
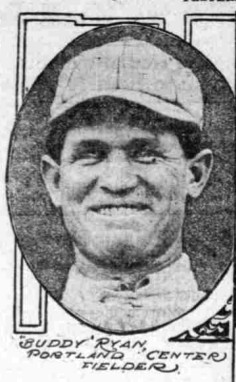
Buddy Ryan

Center fielder Buddy Ryan, a Denver native, appeared in 190 games, compiled a .333 batting average, scored 120 runs, and led the PCL with 247 hits and 23 home runs. He also ranked among the league's best defensive outfielders with 309 putouts, 24 assists, five errors, and a .985 fielding percentage.

Right fielder Chet Chadbourne, a Maine native, appeared in 196 games, compiled a .298 batting average, and stole 53 bases. Defensively, Chadbourne tallied 300 putouts, 30 assists, 18 errors, and a .948 fielding percentage.

Left fielder Art Kruger, a Texas native, appeared in 187 games, stole 32 bases, scored 100 runs, and led the league with 57 doubles. Defensively, he led all PCL outfielders with 451 putouts.

== Infielders ==
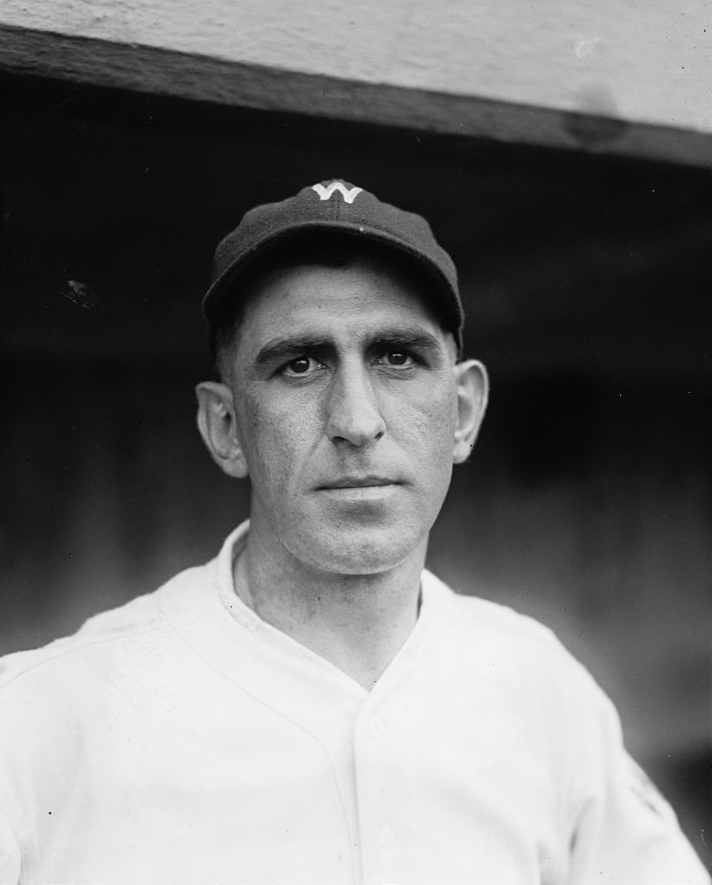
Roger Peckinpaugh

First baseman Bill Rapps, a Missouri native, appeared in 179 games, compiled a .279 batting average, stole 36 bases, scored 81 runs, and tallied 181 hits, 35 doubles, and six triples. Among the seven PCL first baseman appearing in at least 50 games, Rapps ranked third with a .982 fielding percentage.

Second baseman Bill Rodgers, an Ohio native, appeared in 99 games, compiled a .265 batting average and tallied 18 stolen bases, 15 doubles, and six triples. He ranked second among the league's second basemen with a .953 fielding percentage.

Shortstop Roger Peckinpaugh, an Ohio native, appeared in 195 games, scored 86 runs, stole 35 bases, and tallied 38 doubles, 15 triples, and seven home runs. Defensively, he ranked second among the PCL's shortstops with 409 putouts and 658 assists.

Bill Lindsay (third baseman) also played 46 games at 2b/3b once he was released from the 1911 Cleveland Naps.

Catching duty was shared by Pittsburgh native Tommy Murray (.241 batting average) and California native Walt Kuhn (.228 batting average).

== Pitchers ==
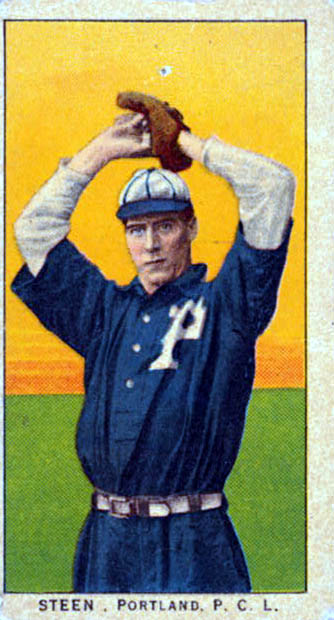
Bill Steen displayed on an American Tobacco card

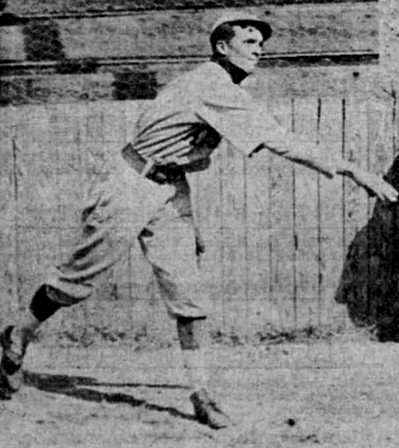
Elmer Koestner

"Big Bill" Steen, a Pittsburgh native, appeared in 49 games and led the PCL with 30 wins and a .667 winning percentage. He compiled a record of 30–15 with 213 strikeouts.

Elmer Koestner, an Illinois native, appeared in 55 games and compiled a 25–15 record. He led the team and ranked third in the PCL with 237 strikeouts. He also ranked second among the PCL's pitchers with 129 fielding assists.

Tom Seaton, a Nebraska native, appeared in 52 games, compiled a 24–16 record, and led the team with a 1.77 earned run average (ERA).

== 1911 PCL standings ==
Team	W	L	Pct.	GB
Portland Beavers	113	79	.589	--
Vernon Tigers	118	88	.573	2.0
Oakland Oaks	111	99	.529	11.0
Sacramento Sacts	95	109	.466	24.0
San Francisco Seals	95	112	.459	25.5
Los Angeles Angels	82	127	.391	39.5

== Statistics ==
=== Batting ===
Note: Pos = Position; G = Games played; AB = At bats; H = Hits; Avg. = Batting average; HR = Home runs; SLG = Slugging percentage; SB = Stolen bases

Pos	Player	G	AB	H	Avg.	HR	SLG	SB
CF	Buddy Ryan	190	741	247	.333	23	.528	39
RF	Chet Chadbourne	196	689	205	.298	0	.341	53
3B	Bill Lindsay	46	179	51	.285	1	.352	12
LF	Art Kruger	187	743	207	.279	4	.390	32
1B	Bill Rapps	179	648	181	.279	0	.352	36
2B	Bill Rodgers	99	377	100	.265	1	.345	18
SS	Roger Peckinpaugh	195	702	181	.258	7	.385	35
2B, 3B	Tommy Sheehan	184	673	171	.254	2	.327	22
C	Tommy Murray	78	241	58	.241	0	.274	9
C	Walt Kuhn	120	346	79	.228	2	.301	15
UIF	Shad Barry	61	181	35	.193	0	.210	5

=== Pitching ===
Note: G = Games pitched; IP = Innings pitched; W = Wins; L = Losses; PCT = Win percentage; ERA = Earned run average; SO = Strikeouts

Player	G	IP	W	L	PCT	ERA	SO
Bill Steen	49	366.2	30	15	.667	2.36	213
Elmer Koestner	54	404.2	25	15	.625	2.62	237
Tom Seaton	52	382.0	24	16	.600	1.77	218
Ben Henderson	42	289.2	21	12	.636	2.02	185
Spec Harkness	18	127.0	5	8	.385	2.91	74
