= List of Major League Baseball players (N) =

The following is a list of Major League Baseball players, retired or active. As of the end of the 2011 season, there have been 307 players with a last name that begins with N who have been on a major league roster at some point.

== N ==
| Name | Debut | Final game | Position | Teams | Ref |
|---|---|---|---|---|---|
| Chris Nabholz | June 11, 1990 | August 8, 1995 | Pitcher | Montreal Expos, Cleveland Indians, Boston Red Sox, Chicago Cubs | |
| Jack Nabors | August 9, 1915 | April 16, 1917 | Pitcher | Philadelphia Athletics | |
| Xavier Nady | September 30, 2000 | | Outfielder | San Diego Padres, New York Mets, Pittsburgh Pirates, New York Yankees, Chicago Cubs, Arizona Diamondbacks | |
| Tim Naehring | July 15, 1990 | June 23, 1997 | Third baseman | Boston Red Sox | |
| Bill Nagel | April 20, 1939 | September 25, 1945 | Utility player | Philadelphia Athletics, Philadelphia Phillies, Chicago White Sox | |
| Lou Nagelsen | September 10, 1912 | September 16, 1912 | Catcher | Cleveland Naps | |
| Russ Nagelson | September 11, 1968 | October 1, 1970 | Outfielder | Cleveland Indians, Detroit Tigers | |
| Clint Nageotte | June 1, 2004 | April 23, 2006 | Pitcher | Seattle Mariners | |
| Judge Nagle | April 26, 1911 | September 4, 1911 | Pitcher | Pittsburgh Pirates, Boston Red Sox | |
| Tom Nagle | April 22, 1890 | May 27, 1891 | Catcher | Chicago Colts | |
| Charles Nagy | June 29, 1990 | June 1, 2003 | Pitcher | Cleveland Indians, San Diego Padres | |
| Mike Nagy | April 21, 1969 | May 19, 1974 | Pitcher | Boston Red Sox, St. Louis Cardinals, Houston Astros | |
| Steve Nagy | April 20, 1947 | June 23, 1950 | Pitcher | Pittsburgh Pirates, Washington Senators | |
| Sam Nahem | October 2, 1938 | September 11, 1948 | Pitcher | Brooklyn Dodgers, St. Louis Cardinals, Philadelphia Phillies | |
| Bill Nahorodny | September 27, 1976 | September 25, 1984 | Catcher | Philadelphia Phillies, Chicago White Sox, Atlanta Braves, Cleveland Indians, Detroit Tigers, Seattle Mariners | |
| Micheal Nakamura | June 7, 2003 | July 31, 2004 | Pitcher | Minnesota Twins, Toronto Blue Jays | |
| Norihiro Nakamura | April 10, 2005 | May 6, 2005 | Third baseman | Los Angeles Dodgers | |
| Pete Naktenis | June 13, 1936 | May 14, 1939 | Pitcher | Philadelphia Athletics, Cincinnati Reds | |
| Frank Naleway | September 16, 1924 | September 16, 1924 | Shortstop | Chicago White Sox | |
| Kid Nance | August 19, 1897 | September 28, 1901 | Outfielder | Louisville Colonels, Detroit Tigers | |
| Shane Nance | August 24, 2002 | September 28, 2004 | Pitcher | Milwaukee Brewers, Arizona Diamondbacks | |
| Buddy Napier | August 14, 1912 | July 16, 1921 | Pitcher | St. Louis Browns, Chicago Cubs, Cincinnati Reds | |
| Al Naples | June 25, 1949 | June 26, 1949 | Shortstop | St. Louis Browns | |
| Danny Napoleon | April 14, 1965 | October 2, 1966 | Outfielder | New York Mets | |
| Mike Napoli | May 4, 2006 | | Catcher | Los Angeles Angels of Anaheim, Texas Rangers | |
| Hal Naragon | September 23, 1951 | August 5, 1962 | Catcher | Cleveland Indians, Washington Senators, Minnesota Twins | |
| Cholly Naranjo | July 8, 1956 | September 9, 1956 | Pitcher | Pittsburgh Pirates | |
| Bill Narleski | April 18, 1929 | June 26, 1930 | Shortstop | Boston Red Sox | |
| Ray Narleski | April 17, 1954 | September 26, 1959 | Pitcher | Cleveland Indians, Detroit Tigers | |
| Jerry Narron | April 13, 1979 | October 2, 1987 | Catcher | New York Yankees, Seattle Mariners, California Angels | |
| Sam Narron (C) | September 15, 1935 | September 30, 1943 | Catcher | St. Louis Cardinals | |
| Sam Narron (P) | July 30, 2004 | July 30, 2004 | Pitcher | Texas Rangers | |
| Buster Narum | April 14, 1963 | September 26, 1967 | Pitcher | Baltimore Orioles, Washington Senators (1961–1971) | |
| Chris Narveson | September 8, 2006 | | Pitcher | St. Louis Cardinals, Milwaukee Brewers | |
| Billy Nash | August 5, 1884 | May 28, 1898 | Third baseman | Richmond Virginians, Boston Beaneaters, Boston Reds (PL), Philadelphia Phillies | |
| Cotton Nash | September 1, 1967 | October 1, 1970 | First baseman | Chicago White Sox, Minnesota Twins | |
| Jim Nash | July 3, 1966 | September 30, 1972 | Pitcher | Kansas City Athletics/Oakland Athletics, Atlanta Braves, Philadelphia Phillies | |
| Ken Nash | July 4, 1912 | October 5, 1914 | Utility infielder | Cleveland Naps, St. Louis Cardinals | |
| Philip Nastu | September 15, 1978 | October 3, 1980 | Pitcher | San Francisco Giants | |
| Bob Natal | July 18, 1992 | September 26, 1997 | Catcher | Montreal Expos, Florida Marlins | |
| Joe Nathan | April 21, 1999 | | Pitcher | San Francisco Giants, Minnesota Twins | |
| Joey Nation | September 23, 2000 | September 28, 2000 | Pitcher | Chicago Cubs | |
| Pete Naton | June 16, 1953 | September 19, 1953 | Catcher | Pittsburgh Pirates | |
| Dan Naulty | April 2, 1996 | October 3, 1999 | Pitcher | Minnesota Twins, New York Yankees | |
| Daniel Nava | June 12, 2010 | | Outfielder | Boston Red Sox | |
| Sandy Nava | May 5, 1882 | June 29, 1886 | Catcher | Providence Grays, Baltimore Orioles (AA) | |
| Dioner Navarro | September 7, 2004 | | Catcher | New York Yankees, Los Angeles Dodgers, Tampa Bay Devil Rays/Rays | |
| Efren Navarro | September 2, 2011 | | First baseman | Los Angeles Angels of Anaheim | |
| Jaime Navarro | June 20, 1989 | July 26, 2000 | Pitcher | Milwaukee Brewers, Chicago Cubs, Chicago White Sox, Cleveland Indians | |
| Julio Navarro | September 3, 1962 | September 9, 1970 | Pitcher | Los Angeles Angels, Detroit Tigers, Atlanta Braves | |
| Oswaldo Navarro | September 9, 2006 | | Shortstop | Seattle Mariners, Houston Astros | |
| Tito Navarro | September 6, 1993 | October 3, 1993 | Shortstop | New York Mets | |
| Yamaico Navarro | August 20, 2010 | | Shortstop | Boston Red Sox, Kansas City Royals | |
| Earl Naylor | April 15, 1942 | May 14, 1946 | Outfielder | Philadelphia Phillies, Brooklyn Dodgers | |
| Rollie Naylor | September 14, 1917 | June 28, 1924 | Pitcher | Philadelphia Athletics | |
| Mike Naymick | September 24, 1939 | July 6, 1944 | Pitcher | Cleveland Indians, St. Louis Cardinals | |
| Denny Neagle | July 27, 1991 | July 20, 2003 | Pitcher | Minnesota Twins, Pittsburgh Pirates, Atlanta Braves, Cincinnati Reds, New York Yankees, Colorado Rockies | |
| Jack Neagle | July 8, 1879 | October 4, 1884 | Pitcher | Cincinnati Reds (1876–1880), Philadelphia Quakers, Baltimore Orioles (AA), Pittsburgh Alleghenys | |
| Blaine Neal | September 3, 2001 | June 15, 2005 | Pitcher | Florida Marlins, San Diego Padres, Boston Red Sox, Colorado Rockies | |
| Charlie Neal | April 17, 1956 | September 29, 1963 | Second baseman | Brooklyn/Los Angeles Dodgers, New York Mets, Cincinnati Reds | |
| Offa Neal | September 30, 1905 | October 3, 1905 | Third baseman | New York Giants | |
| Greasy Neale | April 12, 1916 | June 13, 1924 | Outfielder | Cincinnati Reds, Philadelphia Phillies | |
| Joe Neale | June 21, 1886 | June 29, 1891 | Pitcher | Louisville Colonels, St. Louis Browns | |
| Jim Nealon | April 12, 1906 | September 6, 1907 | First baseman | Pittsburgh Pirates | |
| Ron Necciai | August 10, 1952 | September 28, 1952 | Pitcher | Pittsburgh Pirates | |
| Tom Needham | May 12, 1904 | July 8, 1914 | Catcher | Boston Beaneaters/Doves, New York Giants, Chicago Cubs | |
| Troy Neel | May 30, 1992 | August 11, 1994 | Designated hitter | Oakland Athletics | |
| Cal Neeman | April 16, 1957 | September 29, 1963 | Catcher | Chicago Cubs, Philadelphia Phillies, Pittsburgh Pirates, Cleveland Indians, Washington Senators (1961–1971) | |
| Doug Neff | June 26, 1914 | October 6, 1915 | Utility infielder | Washington Senators | |
| Ron Negray | September 14, 1952 | May 9, 1958 | Pitcher | Brooklyn Dodgers, Philadelphia Phillies, Los Angeles Dodgers | |
| Jim Neher | September 10, 1912 | September 10, 1912 | Pitcher | Cleveland Naps | |
| Art Nehf | August 13, 1915 | October 3, 1929 | Pitcher | Boston Braves, New York Giants, Cincinnati Reds, Chicago Cubs | |
| Gary Neibauer | April 12, 1969 | September 16, 1973 | Pitcher | Atlanta Braves, Philadelphia Phillies | |
| Jim Neidlinger | August 1, 1990 | September 29, 1990 | Pitcher | Los Angeles Dodgers | |
| Al Neiger | July 30, 1960 | September 28, 1960 | Pitcher | Philadelphia Phillies | |
| Bob Neighbors | September 16, 1939 | September 30, 1939 | Shortstop | St. Louis Browns | |
| Cy Neighbors | April 29, 1908 | April 29, 1908 | Outfielder | Pittsburgh Pirates | |
| Mike Neill | July 27, 1998 | August 1, 1998 | Outfielder | Oakland Athletics | |
| Tommy Neill | September 10, 1946 | May 12, 1947 | Outfielder | Boston Braves | |
| Bernie Neis | April 14, 1920 | October 2, 1927 | Outfielder | Brooklyn Robins, Boston Braves, Cleveland Indians, Chicago White Sox | |
| Ernie Neitzke | June 2, 1921 | August 2, 1921 | Outfielder | Boston Red Sox | |
| Bots Nekola | July 19, 1929 | April 30, 1933 | Pitcher | New York Yankees, Detroit Tigers | |
| Andy Nelson | May 26, 1908 | June 6, 1908 | Pitcher | Chicago White Sox | |
| Bill Nelson | September 3, 1884 | September 10, 1884 | Pitcher | Pittsburgh Alleghenys | |
| Brad Nelson | September 1, 2008 | | Utility player | Milwaukee Brewers | |
| Bryant Nelson | May 14, 2002 | July 15, 2002 | Utility player | Boston Red Sox | |
| Candy Nelson | June 11, 1872 | August 25, 1890 | Shortstop | Troy Haymakers, Eckford of Brooklyn, New York Mutuals, Indianapolis Blues, Worcester Ruby Legs, New York Metropolitans, New York Giants, Brooklyn Gladiators | |
| Chris Nelson | June 19, 2010 | | Utility infielder | Colorado Rockies | |
| Dave Nelson | April 11, 1968 | September 27, 1977 | Second baseman | Cleveland Indians, Washington Senators (1961–1971), Texas Rangers, Kansas City Royals | |
| Emmett Nelson | June 24, 1935 | July 28, 1936 | Pitcher | Cincinnati Reds | |
| Gene Nelson | May 4, 1981 | September 29, 1993 | Pitcher | New York Yankees, Seattle Mariners, Chicago White Sox, Oakland Athletics, California Angels, Texas Rangers | |
| Jamie Nelson | July 21, 1983 | October 1, 1983 | Catcher | Seattle Mariners | |
| Jeff Nelson | April 16, 1992 | June 2, 2006 | Pitcher | Seattle Mariners, New York Yankees, Texas Rangers, Chicago White Sox | |
| Jim Nelson | May 30, 1970 | July 15, 1971 | Pitcher | Pittsburgh Pirates | |
| Joe Nelson | June 13, 2001 | | Pitcher | Atlanta Braves, Boston Red Sox, Kansas City Royals, Florida Marlins, Tampa Bay Rays | |
| John Nelson | September 7, 2006 | October 1, 2006 | Utility infielder | St. Louis Cardinals | |
| Luke Nelson | May 25, 1919 | July 11, 1919 | Pitcher | New York Yankees | |
| Lynn Nelson | April 18, 1930 | July 3, 1940 | Pitcher | Chicago Cubs, Philadelphia Athletics, Detroit Tigers | |
| Mel Nelson | September 27, 1960 | June 2, 1969 | Pitcher | St. Louis Cardinals, Los Angeles Angels, Minnesota Twins | |
| Ray Nelson | May 6, 1901 | August 16, 1901 | Second baseman | New York Giants | |
| Red Nelson | September 9, 1910 | June 9, 1913 | Pitcher | St. Louis Browns, Philadelphia Phillies, Cincinnati Reds | |
| Ricky Nelson | May 17, 1983 | August 2, 1986 | Outfielder | Seattle Mariners | |
| Rob Nelson | September 9, 1986 | April 29, 1990 | First baseman | Oakland Athletics, San Diego Padres | |
| Rocky Nelson | April 27, 1949 | September 29, 1961 | First baseman | St. Louis Cardinals, Pittsburgh Pirates, Chicago White Sox, Brooklyn Dodgers, Cleveland Indians | |
| Roger Nelson | September 9, 1967 | September 23, 1976 | Pitcher | Chicago White Sox, Baltimore Orioles, Kansas City Royals, Cincinnati Reds | |
| Tex Nelson | June 22, 1955 | June 14, 1957 | Outfielder | Baltimore Orioles | |
| Tommy Nelson | April 17, 1945 | September 30, 1945 | Third baseman | Boston Braves | |
| Dick Nen | September 18, 1963 | June 28, 1970 | First baseman | Los Angeles Dodgers, Washington Senators (1961–1971), Chicago Cubs | |
| Robb Nen | April 10, 1993 | September 28, 2002 | Pitcher | Texas Rangers, Florida Marlins, San Francisco Giants | |
| Pat Neshek | July 7, 2006 | | Pitcher | Minnesota Twins, San Diego Padres | |
| Jack Ness | May 9, 1911 | September 30, 1916 | First baseman | Detroit Tigers, Chicago White Sox | |
| Graig Nettles | September 6, 1967 | October 1, 1988 | Third baseman | Minnesota Twins, Cleveland Indians, New York Yankees, San Diego Padres, Atlanta Braves, Montreal Expos | |
| Jim Nettles | September 7, 1970 | September 13, 1981 | Outfielder | Minnesota Twins, Detroit Tigers, Kansas City Royals, Oakland Athletics | |
| Morris Nettles | April 26, 1974 | September 28, 1975 | Outfielder | California Angels | |
| Milo Netzel | September 16, 1909 | October 3, 1909 | Third baseman | Cleveland Naps | |
| Mike Neu | April 9, 2003 | June 11, 2004 | Pitcher | Oakland Athletics, Florida Marlins | |
| Otto Neu | July 10, 1917 | July 10, 1917 | Shortstop | St. Louis Browns | |
| Hal Neubauer | June 12, 1925 | September 8, 1925 | Pitcher | Boston Red Sox | |
| Tacks Neuer | August 28, 1907 | October 3, 1907 | Pitcher | New York Yankees | |
| Nick Neugebauer | August 19, 2001 | September 25, 2002 | Pitcher | Milwaukee Brewers | |
| Dan Neumeier | September 8, 1972 | October 4, 1972 | Pitcher | Chicago White Sox | |
| Johnny Neun | April 14, 1925 | September 27, 1931 | First baseman | Detroit Tigers, Boston Braves | |
| Ernie Nevel | September 26, 1950 | May 30, 1953 | Pitcher | New York Yankees, Cincinnati Reds | |
| Ernie Nevers | April 26, 1926 | May 4, 1928 | Pitcher | St. Louis Browns | |
| Alexander Nevin | May 6, 1873 | July 23, 1873 | Third baseman | Elizabeth Resolutes | |
| Phil Nevin | June 11, 1995 | September 29, 2006 | Utility player | Houston Astros, Detroit Tigers, San Diego Padres, Texas Rangers, Chicago Cubs, Minnesota Twins | |
| Don Newcombe | May 20, 1949 | October 1, 1960 | Pitcher | Brooklyn/Los Angeles Dodgers, Cincinnati Redlegs/Reds, Cleveland Indians | |
| John Newell | July 22, 1891 | August 1, 1891 | Third baseman | Pittsburgh Pirates | |
| T. E. Newell | August 8, 1877 | August 8, 1877 | Shortstop | St. Louis Brown Stockings | |
| Tom Newell | September 9, 1987 | September 18, 1987 | Pitcher | Philadelphia Phillies | |
| Marc Newfield | July 6, 1993 | September 15, 1998 | Outfielder | Seattle Mariners, San Diego Padres, Milwaukee Brewers | |
| David Newhan | June 4, 1999 | | Outfielder | San Diego Padres, Philadelphia Phillies, Baltimore Orioles, New York Mets, Houston Astros | |
| Don Newhauser | June 15, 1972 | July 13, 1974 | Pitcher | Boston Red Sox | |
| Hal Newhouser | September 29, 1939 | May 3, 1955 | Pitcher | Detroit Tigers, Cleveland Indians | |
| Floyd Newkirk | August 21, 1934 | August 21, 1934 | Pitcher | New York Yankees | |
| Joel Newkirk | August 20, 1919 | April 23, 1920 | Pitcher | Chicago Cubs | |
| Maury Newlin | September 20, 1940 | September 17, 1941 | Pitcher | St. Louis Browns | |
| Al Newman | June 14, 1985 | October 3, 1992 | Utility infielder | Montreal Expos, Minnesota Twins, Texas Rangers | |
| Alan Newman | May 14, 1999 | June 26, 2000 | Pitcher | Tampa Bay Devil Rays, Cleveland Indians | |
| Charlie Newman | September 11, 1892 | October 15, 1892 | Outfielder | New York Giants, Chicago Colts | |
| Fred Newman | September 16, 1962 | August 5, 1967 | Pitcher | Los Angeles/California Angels | |
| Jeff Newman | June 30, 1976 | September 7, 1984 | Catcher | Oakland Athletics, Boston Red Sox | |
| Josh Newman | September 12, 2007 | | Pitcher | Colorado Rockies, Kansas City Royals | |
| Ray disNewman | May 16, 1971 | May 24, 1973 | Pitcher | Chicago Cubs, Milwaukee Brewers | |
| Patrick Newnam | May 29, 1910 | May 13, 1911 | First baseman | St. Louis Browns | |
| Bobo Newsom | September 11, 1929 | September 17, 1953 | Pitcher | Brooklyn Robins/Dodgers, Chicago Cubs, St. Louis Browns, Washington Senators, Boston Red Sox, Detroit Tigers, Philadelphia Athletics, New York Yankees, New York Giants | |
| Dick Newsome | April 25, 1941 | September 27, 1943 | Pitcher | Boston Red Sox | |
| Skeeter Newsome | April 19, 1935 | September 17, 1947 | Shortstop | Philadelphia Athletics, Boston Red Sox, Philadelphia Phillies | |
| Warren Newson | May 29, 1991 | September 27, 1998 | Outfielder | Chicago White Sox, Seattle Mariners, Texas Rangers | |
| Doc Newton | April 27, 1900 | May 7, 1909 | Pitcher | Cincinnati Reds, Brooklyn Superbas, New York Highlanders | |
| Fu-Te Ni | June 29, 2009 | | Pitcher | Detroit Tigers | |
| Gus Niarhos | June 9, 1946 | September 9, 1955 | Catcher | New York Yankees, Chicago White Sox, Boston Red Sox, Philadelphia Phillies | |
| Juan Nicasio | May 28, 2011 | | Pitcher | Colorado Rockies | |
| Don Nicholas | April 16, 1952 | May 9, 1954 | Pinch runner | Chicago White Sox | |
| Sam Nicholl | October 5, 1888 | May 4, 1890 | Outfielder | Pittsburgh Alleghenys, Columbus Solons | |
| Simon Nicholls | September 18, 1903 | April 25, 1910 | Shortstop | Detroit Tigers, Philadelphia Athletics, Cleveland Naps | |
| Al Nichols | April 24, 1875 | September 26, 1877 | Third baseman | Brooklyn Atlantics, New York Mutuals, Louisville Grays | |
| Art Nichols | September 16, 1898 | June 10, 1903 | Utility player | Chicago Orphans, St. Louis Cardinals | |
| Carl Nichols | September 14, 1986 | July 5, 1991 | Catcher | Baltimore Orioles, Houston Astros | |
| Chet Nichols Sr. | July 30, 1926 | May 29, 1932 | Pitcher | Pittsburgh Pirates, New York Giants, Philadelphia Phillies | |
| Chet Nichols Jr. | April 19, 1951 | April 24, 1964 | Pitcher | Boston/Milwaukee Braves, Boston Red Sox, Cincinnati Reds | |
| Dolan Nichols | April 15, 1958 | September 26, 1958 | Pitcher | Chicago Cubs | |
| Kid Nichols | April 23, 1890 | May 18, 1906 | Pitcher | Boston Beaneaters, St. Louis Cardinals, Philadelphia Phillies | |
| Reid Nichols | September 16, 1980 | October 4, 1987 | Outfielder | Boston Red Sox, Chicago White Sox, Montreal Expos | |
| Rod Nichols | July 30, 1988 | August 29, 1995 | Pitcher | Cleveland Indians, Los Angeles Dodgers, Atlanta Braves | |
| Roy Nichols | May 6, 1944 | October 1, 1944 | Utility infielder | New York Giants | |
| Tricky Nichols | April 19, 1875 | July 11, 1882 | Pitcher | New Haven Elm Citys, Boston Red Caps, St. Louis Brown Stockings, Providence Grays, Worcester Ruby Legs, Baltimore Orioles (AA) | |
| Bill Nicholson | June 13, 1936 | September 19, 1953 | Outfielder | Philadelphia Athletics, Chicago Cubs, Philadelphia Phillies | |
| Dave Nicholson | May 24, 1960 | October 1, 1967 | Outfielder | Baltimore Orioles, Chicago White Sox, Houston Astros, Atlanta Braves | |
| Frank Nicholson | September 6, 1912 | September 10, 1912 | Pitcher | Philadelphia Phillies | |
| Fred Nicholson | April 11, 1917 | September 16, 1922 | Outfielder | Detroit Tigers, Pittsburgh Pirates, Boston Braves | |
| Kevin Nicholson | June 23, 2000 | September 3, 2000 | Shortstop | San Diego Padres | |
| Ovid Nicholson | September 17, 1912 | September 26, 1912 | Outfielder | Pittsburgh Pirates | |
| Parson Nicholson | September 14, 1888 | May 6, 1895 | Second baseman | Detroit Wolverines, Toledo Maumees, Washington Senators (NL) | |
| Chris Nichting | May 15, 1995 | July 2, 2002 | Pitcher | Texas Rangers, Cleveland Indians, Cincinnati Reds, Colorado Rockies | |
| Mike Nickeas | September 4, 2010 | | Catcher | New York Mets | |
| Doug Nickle | September 18, 2000 | September 28, 2002 | Pitcher | Philadelphia Phillies, San Diego Padres | |
| George Nicol | September 23, 1890 | September 29, 1894 | Utility player | St. Louis Browns (AA), Chicago Colts, Pittsburgh Pirates, Louisville Colonels | |
| Hugh Nicol | May 3, 1881 | August 2, 1890 | Outfielder | Chicago White Stockings, St. Louis Browns (AA), Cincinnati Red Stockings (AA)/Reds | |
| Steve Nicosia | July 8, 1978 | September 27, 1985 | Catcher | Pittsburgh Pirates, San Francisco Giants, Montreal Expos, Toronto Blue Jays | |
| Charlie Niebergall | June 17, 1921 | September 28, 1924 | Catcher | St. Louis Cardinals | |
| David Nied | September 1, 1992 | September 27, 1996 | Pitcher | Atlanta Braves, Colorado Rockies | |
| Tom Niedenfuer | August 15, 1981 | September 20, 1990 | Pitcher | Los Angeles Dodgers, Baltimore Orioles, Seattle Mariners, St. Louis Cardinals | |
| Al Niehaus | April 22, 1925 | September 23, 1925 | First baseman | Pittsburgh Pirates, Cincinnati Reds | |
| Dick Niehaus | September 9, 1913 | August 1, 1920 | Pitcher | St. Louis Cardinals, Cleveland Indians | |
| Bert Niehoff | October 4, 1913 | May 17, 1918 | Second baseman | Cincinnati Reds, Philadelphia Phillies, St. Louis Cardinals, New York Giants | |
| Joe Niekro | April 16, 1967 | April 29, 1988 | Pitcher | Chicago Cubs, San Diego Padres, Detroit Tigers, Atlanta Braves, Houston Astros, New York Yankees, Minnesota Twins | |
| Lance Niekro | September 5, 2003 | | First baseman | San Francisco Giants | |
| Phil Niekro | April 15, 1964 | September 27, 1987 | Pitcher | Milwaukee/Atlanta Braves, New York Yankees, Cleveland Indians, Toronto Blue Jays | |
| Jerry Nielsen | July 12, 1992 | July 8, 1993 | Pitcher | New York Yankees, California Angels | |
| Milt Nielsen | September 27, 1949 | July 4, 1951 | Outfielder | Cleveland Indians | |
| Scott Nielsen | July 7, 1986 | June 14, 1989 | Pitcher | New York Yankees, Chicago White Sox | |
| Bob Nieman | September 14, 1951 | October 3, 1962 | Outfielder | St. Louis Browns, Detroit Tigers, Chicago White Sox, Baltimore Orioles, St. Louis Cardinals, Cleveland Indians, San Francisco Giants | |
| Butch Nieman | May 2, 1943 | September 30, 1945 | Outfielder | Boston Braves | |
| Jeff Niemann | April 13, 2008 | | Pitcher | Tampa Bay Rays | |
| Randy Niemann | May 20, 1979 | June 20, 1987 | Pitcher | Houston Astros, Pittsburgh Pirates, Chicago White Sox, New York Mets, Minnesota Twins | |
| Jack Niemes | May 30, 1943 | September 11, 1943 | Pitcher | Cincinnati Reds | |
| Al Niemiec | September 19, 1934 | September 7, 1936 | Second baseman | Boston Red Sox, Philadelphia Athletics | |
| Jon Niese | September 2, 2008 | | Pitcher | New York Mets | |
| Chuck Nieson | September 18, 1964 | September 19, 1964 | Pitcher | Minnesota Twins | |
| Tom Nieto | May 10, 1984 | September 29, 1990 | Catcher | St. Louis Cardinals, Montreal Expos, Minnesota Twins, Philadelphia Phillies | |
| Fernando Nieve | April 4, 2006 | | Pitcher | Houston Astros, New York Mets | |
| José Nieves | August 7, 1998 | July 29, 2002 | Shortstop | Chicago Cubs, Anaheim Angels | |
| Juan Nieves | April 10, 1986 | October 2, 1988 | Pitcher | Milwaukee Brewers | |
| Melvin Nieves | September 1, 1992 | September 14, 1998 | Outfielder | Atlanta Braves, San Diego Padres, Detroit Tigers, Cincinnati Reds | |
| Wil Nieves | July 21, 2002 | | Catcher | San Diego Padres, New York Yankees, Washington Nationals, Milwaukee Brewers | |
| Johnny Niggeling | April 30, 1938 | September 1, 1946 | Pitcher | Boston Bees/Braves, Cincinnati Reds, St. Louis Browns, Washington Senators | |
| Tom Niland | April 19, 1896 | June 6, 1896 | Outfielder | St. Louis Browns (NL) | |
| Bill Niles | May 13, 1895 | August 5, 1895 | Third baseman | Pittsburgh Pirates | |
| Harry Niles | April 24, 1906 | September 28, 1910 | Utility player | St. Louis Browns, New York Highlanders, Boston Red Sox, Cleveland Naps | |
| Rabbit Nill | September 27, 1904 | June 22, 1908 | Utility infielder | Washington Senators, Cleveland Naps | |
| Dave Nilsson | May 18, 1992 | October 3, 1999 | Catcher | Milwaukee Brewers | |
| Al Nipper | September 6, 1983 | July 16, 1990 | Pitcher | Boston Red Sox, Chicago Cubs, Cleveland Indians | |
| Dustin Nippert | September 8, 2005 | | Pitcher | Arizona Diamondbacks, Texas Rangers | |
| Merlin Nippert | September 12, 1962 | September 22, 1962 | Pitcher | Boston Red Sox | |
| Ron Nischwitz | September 4, 1961 | September 19, 1965 | Pitcher | Detroit Tigers, Cleveland Indians | |
| Tsuyoshi Nishioka | April 1, 2011 | | Infielder | Minnesota Twins | |
| Otho Nitcholas | April 18, 1945 | June 3, 1945 | Pitcher | Brooklyn Dodgers | |
| C. J. Nitkowski | June 3, 1995 | June 7, 2005 | Pitcher | Cincinnati Reds, Detroit Tigers, Houston Astros, New York Mets, Texas Rangers, New York Yankees, Atlanta Braves, Washington Nationals | |
| Ramón Nivar | July 30, 2003 | June 11, 2005 | Outfielder | Texas Rangers, Baltimore Orioles | |
| Jayson Nix | April 1, 2008 | | Second baseman | Colorado Rockies, Chicago White Sox, Cleveland Indians, Toronto Blue Jays | |
| Laynce Nix | July 10, 2003 | | Outfielder | Texas Rangers, Milwaukee Brewers, Cincinnati Reds, Washington Nationals | |
| Al Nixon | September 4, 1915 | June 6, 1928 | Outfielder | Brooklyn Robins, Boston Braves, Philadelphia Phillies | |
| Donell Nixon | April 7, 1987 | July 1, 1990 | Outfielder | Seattle Mariners, San Francisco Giants, Baltimore Orioles | |
| Otis Nixon | September 9, 1983 | October 3, 1999 | Outfielder | New York Yankees, Cleveland Indians, Montreal Expos, Atlanta Braves, Boston Red Sox, Texas Rangers, Toronto Blue Jays, Los Angeles Dodgers, Minnesota Twins | |
| Russ Nixon | April 20, 1957 | September 16, 1968 | Catcher | Cleveland Indians, Boston Red Sox, Minnesota Twins | |
| Trot Nixon | September 21, 1996 | June 28, 2008 | Outfielder | Boston Red Sox, Cleveland Indians, Cincinnati Reds | |
| Willard Nixon | July 7, 1950 | July 4, 1958 | Pitcher | Boston Red Sox | |
| Ray Noble | April 18, 1951 | September 22, 1953 | Catcher | New York Giants | |
| Junior Noboa | August 22, 1984 | August 5, 1994 | Second baseman | Cleveland Indians, California Angels, Montreal Expos, New York Mets, Oakland Athletics, Pittsburgh Pirates | |
| Paul Noce | June 1, 1987 | May 17, 1990 | Utility infielder | Chicago Cubs, Cincinnati Reds | |
| Héctor Noesi | May 18, 2011 | | Pitcher | New York Yankees | |
| George Noftsker | April 17, 1884 | May 2, 1884 | Outfielder | Altoona Mountain City | |
| Matt Nokes | September 3, 1985 | September 27, 1995 | Catcher | Detroit Tigers, New York Yankees, Baltimore Orioles, Colorado Rockies | |
| Gary Nolan | April 15, 1967 | September 18, 1977 | Pitcher | Cincinnati Reds, California Angels | |
| Joe Nolan | September 21, 1972 | June 25, 1985 | Catcher | New York Mets, Atlanta Braves, Cincinnati Reds, Baltimore Orioles | |
| The Only Nolan | May 1, 1878 | October 9, 1885 | Pitcher | Indianapolis Blues, Cleveland Blues (NL), Pittsburgh Alleghenys, Wilmington Quicksteps, Philadelphia Quakers | |
| Ricky Nolasco | April 5, 2006 | | Pitcher | Florida Marlins | |
| Dick Nold | August 19, 1967 | September 21, 1967 | Pitcher | Washington Senators (1961–1971) | |
| Dickie Noles | July 5, 1979 | May 8, 1990 | Pitcher | Philadelphia Phillies, Chicago Cubs, Texas Rangers, Cleveland Indians, Detroit Tigers, Baltimore Orioles | |
| Eric Nolte | August 1, 1987 | June 1, 1991 | Pitcher | San Diego Padres, Texas Rangers | |
| Hideo Nomo | May 2, 1995 | April 18, 2008 | Pitcher | Los Angeles Dodgers, New York Mets, Milwaukee Brewers, Detroit Tigers, Boston Red Sox, Tampa Bay Devil Rays, Kansas City Royals | |
| Takahito Nomura | April 3, 2002 | May 15, 2002 | Pitcher | Milwaukee Brewers | |
| Red Nonnenkamp | September 6, 1933 | June 5, 1940 | Outfielder | Boston Red Sox | |
| Pete Noonan | June 20, 1904 | October 6, 1907 | Catcher | Philadelphia Athletics, Chicago Cubs, St. Louis Cardinals | |
| Jerry Nops | September 7, 1896 | September 23, 1901 | Pitcher | Philadelphia Phillies, Baltimore Orioles (NL), Brooklyn Superbas, Baltimore Orioles (1901–1902) | |
| Jordan Norberto | April 6, 2010 | | Pitcher | Arizona Diamondbacks, Oakland Athletics | |
| Tim Nordbrook | September 13, 1974 | June 10, 1979 | Shortstop | Baltimore Orioles, California Angels, Chicago White Sox, Toronto Blue Jays, Milwaukee Brewers | |
| Wayne Nordhagen | July 16, 1976 | May 30, 1983 | Outfielder | Chicago White Sox, Toronto Blue Jays, Pittsburgh Pirates, Chicago Cubs | |
| Lou Nordyke | April 18, 1906 | June 27, 1906 | First baseman | St. Louis Browns | |
| Irv Noren | April 18, 1950 | October 1, 1960 | Outfielder | Washington Senators, New York Yankees, Kansas City Athletics, St. Louis Cardinals, Chicago Cubs, Los Angeles Dodgers | |
| John Noriega | May 1, 1969 | August 9, 1970 | Pitcher | Cincinnati Reds | |
| Bill Norman | August 8, 1931 | September 24, 1932 | Outfielder | Chicago White Sox | |
| Dan Norman | September 27, 1977 | September 29, 1982 | Outfielder | New York Mets, Montreal Expos | |
| Fred Norman | September 21, 1962 | September 25, 1980 | Pitcher | Kansas City Athletics, Chicago Cubs, Los Angeles Dodgers, St. Louis Cardinals, San Diego Padres, Cincinnati Reds, Montreal Expos | |
| Les Norman | May 29, 1995 | September 29, 1996 | Outfielder | Kansas City Royals | |
| Nelson Norman | May 20, 1978 | April 29, 1987 | Shortstop | Texas Rangers, Pittsburgh Pirates, Montreal Expos | |
| Bud Norris | July 29, 2009 | | Pitcher | Houston Astros | |
| Jim Norris | April 7, 1977 | October 5, 1980 | Outfielder | Cleveland Indians, Texas Rangers | |
| Leo Norris | April 14, 1936 | October 3, 1937 | Utility infielder | Philadelphia Phillies | |
| Mike Norris | April 10, 1975 | July 4, 1990 | Pitcher | Oakland Athletics | |
| Billy North | September 3, 1971 | June 11, 1981 | Outfielder | Chicago Cubs, Oakland Athletics, Los Angeles Dodgers, San Francisco Giants | |
| Lou North | August 22, 1913 | July 20, 1924 | Pitcher | Detroit Tigers, St. Louis Cardinals, Boston Braves | |
| Hub Northen | September 10, 1910 | October 5, 1912 | Outfielder | St. Louis Browns, Cincinnati Reds, Brooklyn Dodgers | |
| Ron Northey | April 14, 1942 | September 28, 1957 | Outfielder | Philadelphia Phillies, St. Louis Cardinals, Cincinnati Reds, Chicago Cubs, Chicago White Sox | |
| Scott Northey | September 2, 1969 | October 2, 1969 | Outfielder | Kansas City Royals | |
| Jake Northrop | July 29, 1918 | June 24, 1919 | Pitcher | Boston Braves | |
| Jim Northrup | September 30, 1964 | September 27, 1975 | Outfielder | Detroit Tigers, Montreal Expos, Baltimore Orioles | |
| Effie Norton | August 8, 1896 | June 5, 1897 | Pitcher | Washington Senators (NL) | |
| Frank Norton | May 5, 1871 | May 5, 1871 | Utility player | Washington Olympics | |
| Greg Norton | August 18, 1996 | | Utility player | Chicago White Sox, Colorado Rockies, Detroit Tigers, Tampa Bay Devil Rays, Seattle Mariners, Atlanta Braves | |
| Phil Norton | August 3, 2000 | October 2, 2004 | Pitcher | Chicago Cubs, Cincinnati Reds | |
| Tom Norton | April 18, 1972 | September 30, 1972 | Pitcher | Minnesota Twins | |
| Willie Norwood | April 21, 1977 | October 4, 1980 | Outfielder | Minnesota Twins | |
| Randy Nosek | May 27, 1989 | October 2, 1990 | Pitcher | Detroit Tigers | |
| Joe Nossek | April 18, 1964 | September 13, 1970 | Outfielder | Minnesota Twins, Kansas City/Oakland Athletics, St. Louis Cardinals | |
| Don Nottebart | July 1, 1960 | September 6, 1969 | Pitcher | Milwaukee Braves, Houston Astros, Cincinnati Reds, New York Yankees, Chicago Cubs | |
| Chet Nourse | July 27, 1909 | August 4, 1909 | Pitcher | Boston Red Sox | |
| Iván Nova | May 13, 2010 | | Pitcher | New York Yankees | |
| Lou Novikoff | April 15, 1941 | June 10, 1946 | Outfielder | Chicago Cubs, Philadelphia Phillies | |
| Rafael Novoa | July 31, 1990 | October 3, 1993 | Pitcher | San Francisco Giants, Milwaukee Brewers | |
| Roberto Novoa | July 29, 2004 | September 30, 2006 | Pitcher | Detroit Tigers, Chicago Cubs | |
| Rube Novotney | April 29, 1949 | July 3, 1949 | Catcher | Chicago Cubs | |
| Win Noyes | May 19, 1913 | September 27, 1919 | Pitcher | Boston Braves, Philadelphia Athletics, Chicago White Sox | |
| Les Nunamaker | April 28, 1911 | September 5, 1922 | Catcher | Boston Red Sox, New York Yankees, St. Louis Browns, Cleveland Indians | |
| Abraham Núñez (IF) | August 27, 1997 | | Utility infielder | Pittsburgh Pirates, St. Louis Cardinals, Philadelphia Phillies, New York Mets | |
| Abraham Núñez (OF) | September 3, 2002 | October 3, 2004 | Outfielder | Florida Marlins, Kansas City Royals | |
| Eduardo Núñez | August 19, 2010 | | Utility infielder | New York Yankees | |
| Edwin Núñez | April 7, 1982 | May 16, 1994 | Pitcher | Seattle Mariners, New York Mets, Detroit Tigers, Milwaukee Brewers, Texas Rangers, Oakland Athletics | |
| Franklin Núñez | August 14, 2004 | June 24, 2005 | Pitcher | Tampa Bay Devil Rays | |
| Jhonny Núñez | August 2, 2009 | | Pitcher | Chicago White Sox | |
| José Núñez (RHP) | April 9, 1987 | October 1, 1990 | Pitcher | Toronto Blue Jays, Chicago Cubs | |
| José Núñez (LHP) | April 3, 2001 | April 1, 2002 | Pitcher | Los Angeles Dodgers, San Diego Padres | |
| Leo Núñez | May 9, 2005 | | Pitcher | Kansas City Royals, Florida Marlins | |
| Vladimir Núñez | September 11, 1998 | September 27, 2008 | Pitcher | Arizona Diamondbacks, Florida Marlins, Colorado Rockies, Atlanta Braves | |
| Howie Nunn | April 11, 1959 | June 7, 1962 | Pitcher | St. Louis Cardinals, Cincinnati Reds | |
| Jon Nunnally | April 26, 1995 | May 31, 2000 | Outfielder | Kansas City Royals, Cincinnati Reds, Boston Red Sox, New York Mets | |
| Talmadge Nunnari | September 7, 2000 | October 1, 2000 | First baseman | Montreal Expos | |
| Emory Nusz | April 26, 1884 | April 26, 1884 | Outfielder | Washington Nationals (UA) | |
| Dizzy Nutter | September 7, 1919 | September 26, 1919 | Outfielder | Boston Braves | |
| Joe Nuxhall | June 10, 1944 | October 2, 1966 | Pitcher | Cincinnati Reds/Redlegs, Kansas City Athletics, Los Angeles Angels | |
| Charlie Nyce | May 28, 1895 | August 28, 1895 | Shortstop | Boston Beaneaters | |
| Rich Nye | September 16, 1966 | September 2, 1970 | Pitcher | Chicago Cubs, St. Louis Cardinals, Montreal Expos | |
| Ryan Nye | June 7, 1997 | May 13, 1998 | Pitcher | Philadelphia Phillies | |
| Chris Nyman | July 28, 1982 | October 1, 1983 | First baseman | Chicago White Sox | |
| Jerry Nyman | August 24, 1968 | September 27, 1970 | Pitcher | Chicago White Sox, San Diego Padres | |
| Nyls Nyman | September 6, 1974 | April 7, 1977 | Outfielder | Chicago White Sox | |
