= Buddy Ryan (disambiguation) =

Buddy Ryan may refer to:

- Buddy Ryan, an American football coach
- Buddy Ryan (baseball), a major league Baseball outfielder
- Buddy Ryan (character), a character in the TV series Night Court
