= Albert Johnson (Washington politician) =

American politician (1869–1957)

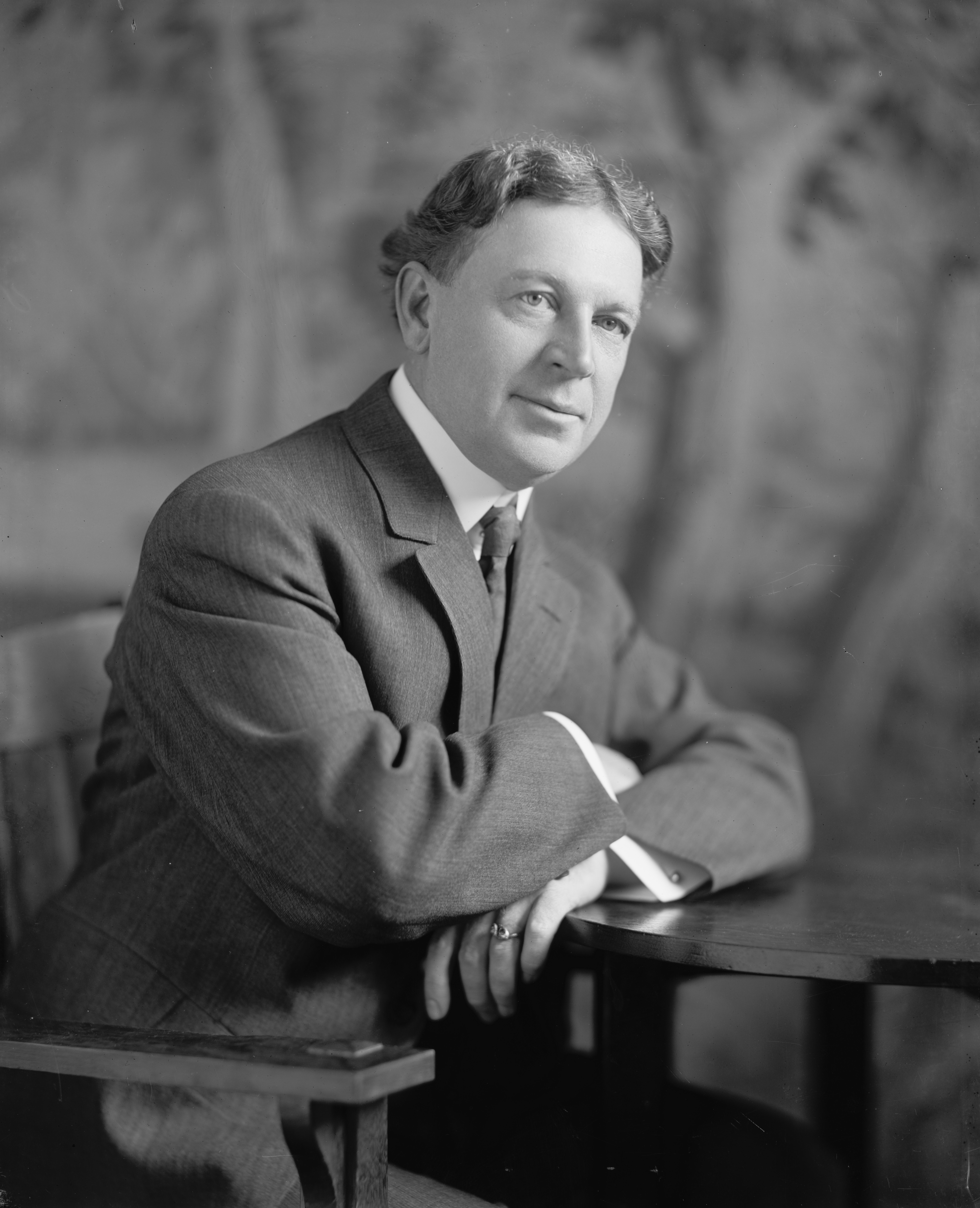

Member of the U.S. House of Representatives from Washington
- In office March 4, 1913 – March 3, 1933
- Preceded by: Stanton Warburton
- Succeeded by: Martin F. Smith
- Constituency: 2nd district (1913–1915); 3rd district (1915–1933)

Personal details
- Born: March 5, 1869 Springfield, Illinois, U.S.
- Died: January 17, 1957 (aged 87) American Lake, Lakewood, Washington, U.S.
- Resting place: Hoquiam, Washington, U.S.
- Party: Republican

Albert Johnson (March 5, 1869 – January 17, 1957) was an American politician who served as the U.S. representative from Washington's third congressional district from 1915 to 1933. He was the chief author of the Immigration Act of 1924, was a member of the Asiatic Exclusion League, and was a eugenicist.

== Background ==
Born in Springfield, Illinois, Johnson attended the schools at Atchison, Kansas and Hiawatha, Kansas.

== Career ==
=== Journalist ===
Johnson worked as a reporter on the St. Joseph (Missouri) Herald and the St. Louis Globe-Democrat from 1888 to 1891, as managing editor of the New Haven Register in 1896 and 1897, and as news editor of The Washington Post in 1898. To edit the Tacoma News he moved to Tacoma, Washington in 1898. He became editor and publisher of Grays Harbor Washingtonian (Hoquiam, Washington) in 1907. Johnson was supportive of the presidency of William Howard Taft, as well as women's suffrage and was opposed to monopolies, writing editorials critical of them.

=== Representative ===
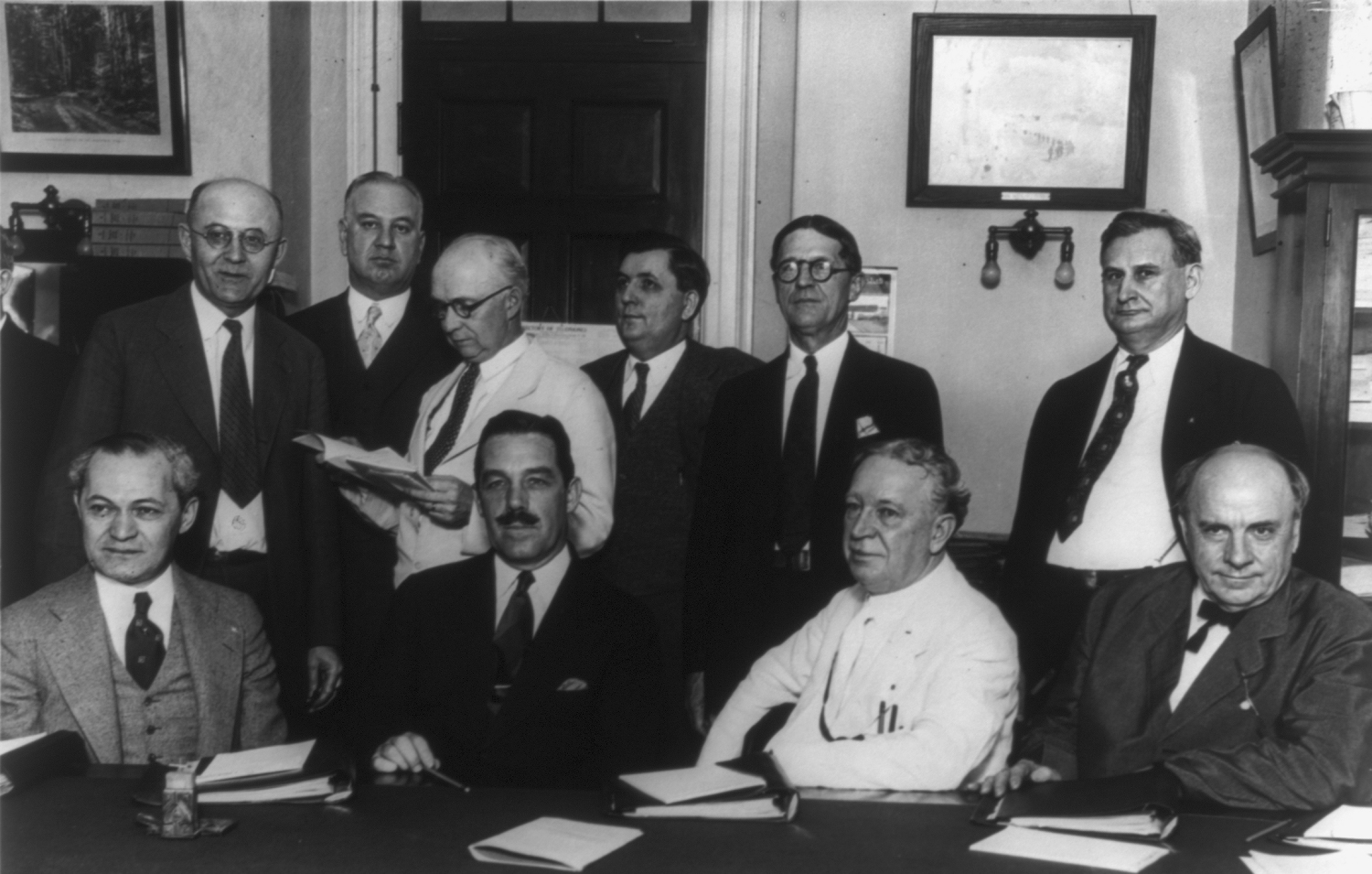
From left to right: Samuel Dickstein, Grover Whalen, Albert Johnson, and John C. Box seated at a committee probing activities of American Communists in 1930

Albert Johnson was elected as a Republican to the Sixty-third and to the nine succeeding Congresses (March 4, 1913 – March 3, 1933), but was defeated in a bid for reelection in November 1932. While a Member of Congress, Johnson was commissioned a captain in the Chemical Warfare Service during the First World War, receiving an honorable discharge on November 29, 1918. He served as chairman of the Committee on Immigration and Naturalization (Sixty-sixth through Seventy-first Congresses), where he played an important role in the passage of the anti-immigrant legislation of the 1920s.

Johnson was the chief author of the Immigration Act of 1924 (known as the Johnson-Reed Act), which in 1927 he justified as a bulwark against "a stream of alien blood, with all its inherited misconceptions respecting the relationships of the governing power to the governed." Johnson has been described as "an unusually energetic and vehement racist and nativist."

=== Eugenicist ===
Johnson appointed one of the leading eugenicists of the era, Harry Laughlin, associated with the Eugenics Record Office in Cold Spring Harbor, New York, as the committee's Expert Eugenics Agent. From 1923 to 1924, he was the president of the Eugenics Research Association, an organization of eugenics researchers and supporters which opposed interracial marriage and also supported the program of forced sterilization of the mentally disabled. In support of his 1919 proposal to suspend immigration he included this quote from a State Department official referring to the recent wave of Jewish immigrants as "filthy, un-American, and often dangerous in their habits."

=== Journalist ===
Johnson retired from the newspaper business in 1934.

== Death ==
Albert Johnson died age 87 on January 17, 1957, in a veterans hospital at American Lake, Washington and was buried in Sunset Memorial Park, Hoquiam, Washington.

== Sources and further reading ==
- Allerfeldt, Kristofer. "‘And We Got Here First’: Albert Johnson, National Origins and Self-Interest in the Immigration Debate of the 1920s." Journal of Contemporary History 45.1 (2010): 7-26.
- Daniels, Roger. Guarding the Golden Door: American Immigration Policy and Immigrants since 1882. Boston & New York: Hill and Wang, 2004.
- Goings, Aaron. Johnson, Albert (1869–1957) - HistoryLink.org Essay 8721.
- Hillier, Alfred J "Albert Johnson, Congressman." Pacific Northwest Quarterly 36(3) (July 1945), 193-212.
- United States Congress. "Albert Johnson (id: J000114)". Biographical Directory of the United States Congress.

U.S. House of Representatives
Preceded by Stanton Warburton	Member of the U.S. House of Representatives from Washington's 2nd congressional district 1913-1915	Succeeded by Lindley H. Hadley
Preceded by William La Follette	Member of the U.S. House of Representatives from Washington's 3rd congressional district 1915-1933	Succeeded by Martin F. Smith
