= Bill Hunter (outfielder) =

American baseball player (1887-1934)

- Outfielder
- Born: July 8, 1887; Buffalo, New York, U.S.
- Died: April 10, 1934 (aged 46); Buffalo, New York, U.S.
- Batted: Left Threw: Left

MLB debut
- August 6, 1912, for the Cleveland Naps

Last MLB appearance
- September 1, 1912, for the Cleveland Naps

MLB statistics
- Batting average: .164
- Home runs: 0
- Runs batted in: 2
- Stats at Baseball Reference

Teams
- Cleveland Naps (1912)

William Ellsworth Hunter (July 8, 1887 – April 10, 1934) was an American Major League Baseball outfielder who played for one season. He played in 21 games for the Cleveland Naps during the 1912 season. His twin brother, George Hunter, also played professional baseball.
