= Ernie Wolf =

American baseball player (1889-1964)

- Pitcher
- Born: February 2, 1889; Newark, New Jersey, U.S.
- Died: May 23, 1964 (aged 75); Atlantic Highlands, New Jersey, U.S.
- Batted: Right Threw: Right

MLB debut
- September 10, 1912, for the Cleveland Naps

Last MLB appearance
- September 10, 1912, for the Cleveland Naps

MLB statistics
- Win–loss record: 0–0
- Earned run average: 6.35
- Strikeouts: 1
- Stats at Baseball Reference

Teams
- Cleveland Naps (1912)

Ernest Adolf Wolf (February 2, 1889 – May 23, 1964) was an American professional baseball pitcher. He pitched in one game in Major League Baseball for the Cleveland Naps on September 10 during the 1912 Cleveland Naps season.
