= Eddie Hohnhorst =

American baseball player (1885–1916)

- First baseman
- Born: January 31, 1885; Covington, Kentucky, U.S.
- Died: March 28, 1916 (aged 31); Covington, Kentucky, U.S.
- Batted: Left Threw: Left

MLB debut
- September 10, 1910, for the Cleveland Naps

Last MLB appearance
- May 23, 1912, for the Cleveland Naps

MLB statistics
- Batting average: .265
- Home runs: 0
- Runs batted in: 8
- Stats at Baseball Reference

Teams
- Cleveland Naps (1910, 1912)

Edward Hicks Hohnhorst (January 31, 1885 – March 28, 1916) was an American Major League Baseball (MLB) first baseman who played for two seasons. He played in 18 games for the Cleveland Naps during the 1910 Cleveland Naps season and 15 games during the 1912 Cleveland Naps season.

Hohnhorst began his professional career in 1908 with the Augusta Tourists and Anderson Electricians, playing in 89 games between the two teams. He spent the full 1909 season with Augusta, finishing the year with a .282 batting average in 123 games. He spent the 1910 season with the San Antonio Bronchos of the Texas League, hitting .235 in 117 games. After the Texas League season ended, the Cleveland Naps brought him and several other players, including Shoeless Joe Jackson, up to the major league roster in September to try and make a late-season push. Hohnhorst finished the season with a .317 batting average in 18 games for the Naps.

Despite the good play at the end of the year, the Naps chose to send Hohnhorst to the Toledo Mud Hens for the 1911 season. He played in 131 games for the team, finishing the year with a .302 average. Hohnhorst was in a position battle for the first baseman position, which he eventually won and began the season as the team's starter. However, he did not play well, only hitting .204 in 15 games. As a result, by the end of May he was out of the Naps lineup and returned to Toledo. Hohnhorst spent the rest of 1912 with Toledo and the Indianapolis Indians, then followed that up with the Austin Toros in 1913 in what would be his last professional baseball team. After the 1913 season ended, Hohnhorst became a police officer in Covington, Kentucky. In 1914 he shot a suspect during an arrest. Although he was found to be blameless for the death, Hohnhorst became guilt-ridden, which led to alcoholism, lack of sleep and stomach pains. Hohnhorst committed suicide with his service revolver, with the death certificate citing "temporary insanity" as the reason for his death.
