= Moxie Meixell =

American baseball player (1887-1982)

- Outfielder
- Born: October 18, 1887; Lake Crystal, Minnesota, U.S.
- Died: August 17, 1982 (aged 94); Los Angeles, California, U.S.
- Batted: Left Threw: Left

MLB debut
- July 7, 1912, for the Cleveland Naps

Last MLB appearance
- July 23, 1912, for the Cleveland Naps

MLB statistics
- Batting average: .500
- Home runs: 0
- Runs batted in: 0
- Stats at Baseball Reference

Former teams
- Monmouth Browns (minor league) (1909)

Teams
- Cleveland Naps (1912)

Merton Merrill Meixell (October 18, 1887 – August 17, 1982) was an American Major League Baseball outfielder who played for one season. He played for the Cleveland Naps for three games during the 1912 Cleveland Naps season.

He had earlier played for the minor league Monmouth Browns (Illinois-Missouri League) in 1909.
