= Stanton Warburton =

American politician (1865–1926)

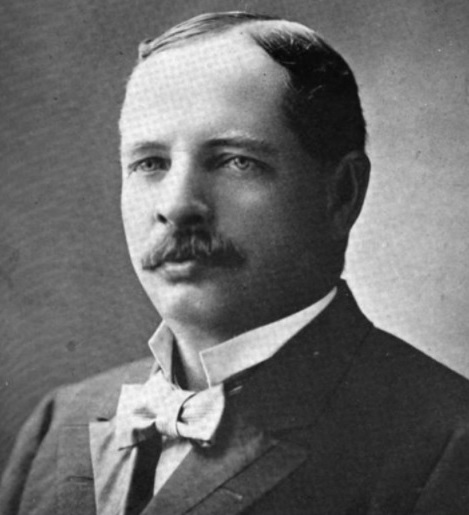
- From Volume II of 1916's Tacoma: Its History and Its Builders

Member of the U.S. House of Representatives from Washington's 2nd district
- In office March 4, 1911 – March 3, 1913
- Preceded by: William Wallace McCredie
- Succeeded by: Albert Johnson

Personal details
- Born: April 13, 1865 Sullivan County, Pennsylvania
- Died: December 24, 1926 (aged 61) Boston, Massachusetts
- Party: Republican

Stanton Warburton (April 13, 1865 – December 24, 1926) was a U.S. representative from Washington.

== Life ==
Born in Sullivan County, Pennsylvania, Warburton moved to Iowa with his parents, who settled in Cherokee in 1868.

He attended the public schools. He was graduated from Cherokee (Iowa) High School in 1884 and from Coe College, Cedar Rapids, Iowa, in 1888. He moved to Tacoma, Washington, in 1888. He studied law and was admitted to the bar in 1889, commencing practice in Tacoma. He served as member of the State senate 1896–1904.

Warburton was elected as a Republican to the Sixty-second Congress (March 4, 1911 – March 3, 1913). He was an unsuccessful candidate for reelection in 1912 to the Sixty-third Congress, and afterwards resumed the practice of law in Tacoma, Washington.

He died in Boston, Massachusetts, December 24, 1926, and was interred in Mountain View Burial Park, Tacoma, Washington.

U.S. House of Representatives
Preceded by William W. McCredie	Member of the U.S. House of Representatives from Washington's 2nd congressional district 1911-1913	Succeeded by Albert Johnson
