= Howard Baker (baseball) =

American baseball player (1888–1964)

- Third baseman
- Born: March 1, 1888; Bridgeport, Connecticut, U.S.
- Died: January 16, 1964 (aged 75); Bridgeport, Connecticut, U.S.
- Batted: Right Threw: Right

MLB debut
- August 11, 1912, for the Cleveland Naps

Last MLB appearance
- October 6, 1915, for the New York Giants

MLB statistics
- Batting average: .220
- Home runs: 0
- Runs batted in: 7
- Stats at Baseball Reference

Teams
- Cleveland Naps (1912); Chicago White Sox (1914–1915); New York Giants (1915)

Howard Francis Baker (March 1, 1888 – January 16, 1964) was an American Major League Baseball third baseman who played for three seasons. He played for the Cleveland Naps in 1912, the Chicago White Sox from 1914 to 1915, and the New York Giants in 1915.
