= Bert Brenner =

American baseball player (1887-1971)

- Pitcher
- Born: July 18, 1887; Minneapolis, Minnesota
- Died: April 11, 1971 (aged 83); St. Louis Park, Minnesota
- Batted: Right Threw: Right

MLB debut
- September 21, 1912, for the Cleveland Naps

Last MLB appearance
- October 5, 1912, for the Cleveland Naps

MLB statistics
- Win–loss record: 1–0
- Earned run average: 2.77
- Strikeouts: 3
- Stats at Baseball Reference

Teams
- Cleveland Naps (1912)

Delbert Henry Brenner (July 18, 1887 – April 11, 1971) was a Major League Baseball pitcher who played for one season. He played for the Cleveland Naps from September 21, 1912, to October 5, 1912.

In 1926, he managed the Columbia Comers of the South Atlantic League.
