= Jack Kibble =

American baseball player (1892-1969)

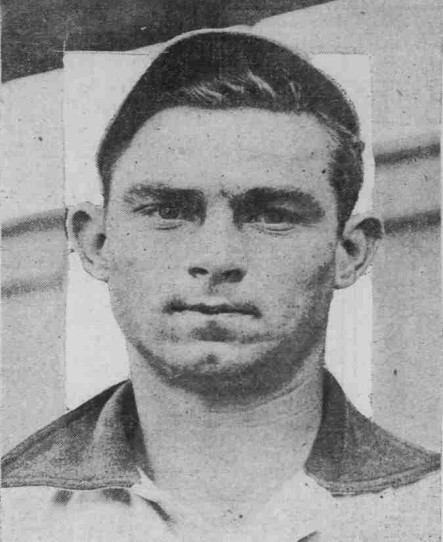
- Third baseman
- Born: January 2, 1892; Seatonville, Illinois, U.S.
- Died: December 13, 1969 (aged 77); Roundup, Montana, U.S.
- Batted: Switch Threw: Right

MLB debut
- September 10, 1912, for the Cleveland Naps

Last MLB appearance
- September 27, 1912, for the Cleveland Naps

MLB statistics
- Batting average: .000
- At bats: 8
- hits: 0
- Stats at Baseball Reference

Teams
- Cleveland Naps (1912)

John Westly Kibble (January 2, 1892 – December 13, 1969) nicknamed "Happy", was an American Major League Baseball player for the Cleveland Naps in 1912. He played five games (four at third base), going 0-for-8 at the plate. His only time on base was a hit by pitch.

== Sources ==
- Career statistics from Baseball Reference · Baseball Reference (Minors) · Retrosheet · Baseball Almanac
