= Lou Nagelsen =

American baseball player (1887-1965)

- Catcher
- Born: June 29, 1887; Piqua, Ohio, U.S.
- Died: October 21, 1965 (aged 78); Fort Wayne, Indiana, U.S.
- Batted: Right Threw: Right

MLB debut
- September 10, 1912, for the Cleveland Naps

Last MLB appearance
- September 16, 1912, for the Cleveland Naps

MLB statistics
- Batting average: .000
- Home runs: 0
- Runs batted in: 6
- Stats at Baseball Reference

Teams
- Cleveland Naps (1912)

Louis Marcellus Nagelsen (born Louis Marcellus Nagelsisen) (June 29, 1887 – October 21, 1965) was an American Major League Baseball catcher who played for one season. He played for the Cleveland Naps for two games during the 1912 Cleveland Naps season. He attended the University of Notre Dame.
