= Roy Walker (baseball) =

American baseball player (1893–1962)

- Pitcher
- Born: April 13, 1893; Lawrenceburg, Tennessee, U.S.
- Died: February 10, 1962 (aged 68); New Orleans, Louisiana, U.S.
- Batted: Right Threw: Right

MLB debut
- September 16, 1912, for the Cleveland Naps

Last MLB appearance
- July 4, 1922, for the St. Louis Cardinals

MLB statistics
- Win–loss record: 17–27
- Earned run average: 3.99
- Strikeouts: 148
- Stats at Baseball Reference

Teams
- Cleveland Naps/Indians (1912, 1915); Chicago Cubs (1917–1918); St. Louis Cardinals (1921–1922)

James Roy Walker (April 13, 1893 – February 10, 1962) was an American Major League Baseball pitcher who played for six seasons. He pitched for the Cleveland Naps/Indians in 1912 and 1915, the Chicago Cubs from 1917 to 1918, and the St. Louis Cardinals from 1921 to 1922.
