= Tom Seaton =

American baseball player (1887–1940)

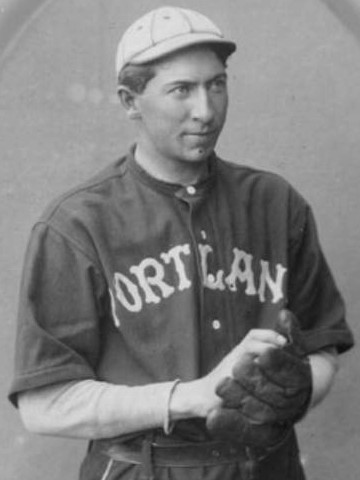
- Pitcher
- Born: August 30, 1887; Blair, Nebraska, U.S.
- Died: April 10, 1940 (aged 52); El Paso, Texas, U.S.
- Batted: Both Threw: Right

MLB debut
- April 13, 1912, for the Philadelphia Phillies

Last MLB appearance
- June 23, 1917, for the Chicago Cubs

MLB statistics
- Win–loss record: 93–65
- Earned run average: 3.14
- Strikeouts: 644
- Stats at Baseball Reference

Teams
- Philadelphia Phillies (1912–1913); Brooklyn Tip-Tops (1914–1915); Newark Pepper (1915); Chicago Cubs (1916–1917)

Career highlights and awards
- NL wins leader (1913); NL strikeout leader (1913)

Thomas Gordon Seaton (August 30, 1887 – April 10, 1940) was an American pitcher in Major League Baseball from 1912–1917. He was signed in 1909 as a pitcher by the Portland, Oregon baseball team in the Pacific Coast League. In 1910 he was part of a pitching staff that included Gene Krapp, Jack Graney, Bill Steen and Vean Gregg. The Philadelphia Phillies drafted Seaton in 1912.

After struggling through a mediocre season in 1912, Seaton became a dominating pitcher in 1913 appearing in 52 games and compiling a 27–12 record in 322.1 innings. After a dispute involving his wife and the Phillies, Seaton signed with the Brooklyn Tip-Tops of the Federal League. Seaton went 25–14 that year. Seaton struggled in 1915.

After the Federal League folded after the 1915 season, Seaton pitched for the Chicago Cubs. He eventually was released and returned to the Pacific Coast League.

As a hitter, Seaton posted a .186 batting average (84-for-451) with 44 runs, 4 home runs, 32 RBI and 24 bases on balls in 231 games.

After the Black Sox Scandal of 1919, Seaton and Luther "Casey" Smith were released in May 1920 due to rumors "...regarding the practices of the players (Seaton and Smith) and their associates."

He died on April 10, 1940.

== See also ==
- List of Major League Baseball annual strikeout leaders
- List of Major League Baseball annual wins leaders
