= Jim Neher =

American baseball player (1889-1951)

- Pitcher
- Born: February 5, 1889; Rochester, New York
- Died: November 11, 1951 (aged 62); Buffalo, New York
- Batted: Right Threw: Right

MLB debut
- September 10, 1912, for the Cleveland Naps

Last MLB appearance
- September 10, 1912, for the Cleveland Naps

MLB statistics
- Win–loss record: 0–0
- Earned run average: 0.00
- Strikeouts: 0
- Stats at Baseball Reference

Teams
- Cleveland Naps (1912)

James Gilmore Neher (February 5, 1889 – November 11, 1951) was a Major League Baseball pitcher who played for one season in the majors. He pitched in one game for the Cleveland Naps on September 10 during the 1912 Cleveland Naps season, pitching one inning. He tried to return to the majors in 1915 with the Indians, but forced to retire due to a broken leg.

Neher was born in Rochester and lived there until age 12. After baseball, he was employed by the Statler Hotel in Buffalo as an elevator repairman and later an electrician. He remained an employee of the Statler until his death from a long-term illness in 1951 at Meyer Memorial Hospital at the age of 62. His wife, Ida, died on June 27, 1964.
