= Tommy Sheehan (baseball) =

American baseball player (1877–1959)

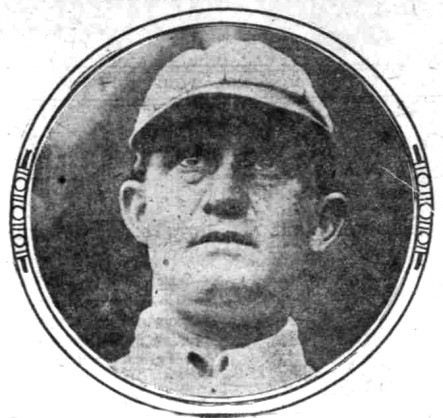
- Third baseman
- Born: November 6, 1877; Sacramento, California, U.S.
- Died: May 22, 1959 (aged 81); Ancón, Panama, U.S.
- Batted: Right Threw: Right

MLB debut
- August 2, 1900, for the New York Giants

Last MLB appearance
- October 7, 1908, for the Brooklyn Superbas

MLB statistics
- Batting average: .235
- Home runs: 1
- Runs batted in: 88
- Stats at Baseball Reference

Teams
- New York Giants (1900); Pittsburgh Pirates (1906–1907); Brooklyn Superbas (1908)

Thomas Patrick Sheehan (November 6, 1877 – May 22, 1959) was an American professional baseball third baseman. He played in Major League Baseball (MLB) in 1900 and from 1906 through 1908 for the New York Giants, Pittsburgh Pirates, and Brooklyn Superbas.
