= William Wallace McCredie =

American politician

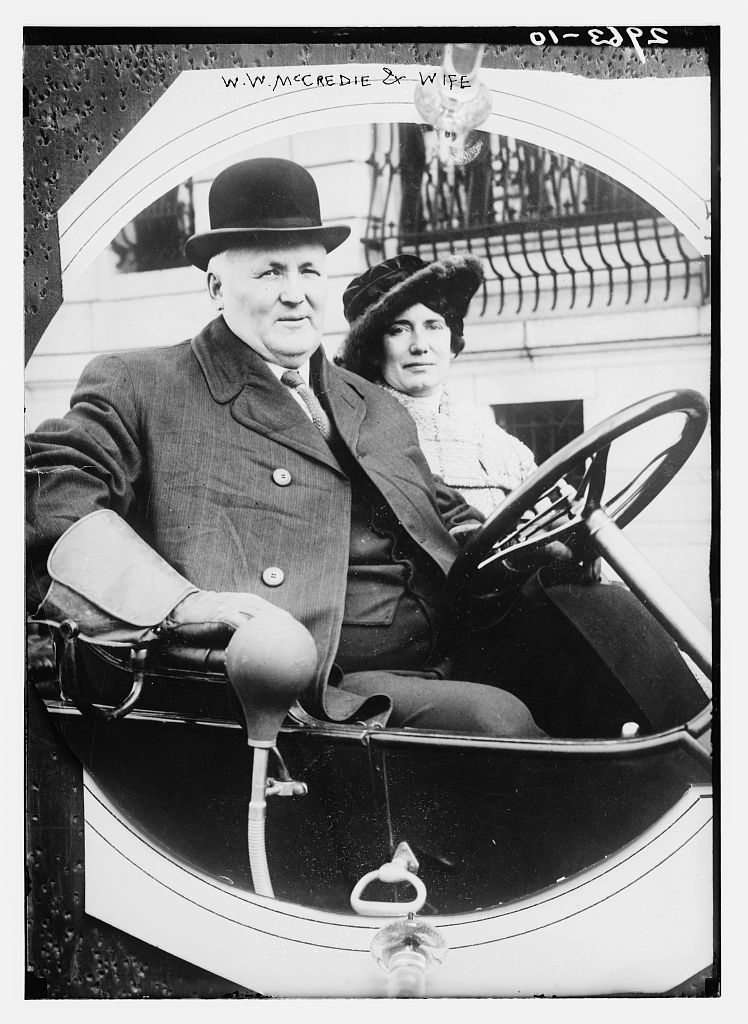
- McCredie c.1913

Member of the U.S. House of Representatives from Washington's 2nd district
- In office November 2, 1909 – March 3, 1911
- Preceded by: Francis W. Cushman
- Succeeded by: Stanton Warburton

Personal details
- Born: April 27, 1862 Montrose, Pennsylvania, U.S.
- Died: May 10, 1935 (aged 73) Portland, Oregon, U.S.
- Resting place: Lincoln Memorial Cemetery
- Party: Republican
- Education: Cornell College

William Wallace "W. W." McCredie (April 27, 1862 – May 10, 1935) was a U.S. representative from Washington.

== Early years ==
Born in Montrose, Pennsylvania, McCredie moved to Iowa with his parents, who settled on a farm near Manchester in Delaware County. He attended the common schools, going on to graduate from Cornell College in 1885. He taught school at Parkersburg, Iowa from 1885 to 1889. He attended the law school of the University of Iowa in 1889 and 1890, then moved to Portland, Oregon in 1890 and completed the study of law. He was admitted to the bar the same year and commenced practice in Vancouver, Washington. During his early legal career, he served as prosecuting attorney of Clark County, Washington from 1894 to 1896 and served as judge of the superior court at Vancouver, Washington from 1904 to 1909.

== Baseball affiliation ==
In 1904, McCredie became part owner of the minor league Portland Beavers baseball club and hired his nephew Walt McCredie as the team's player-manager. At the time, the Portland club was part of the Pacific Coast League which was considered a high level minor league that frequently sent players to major league teams. McCredie was an active owner who helped with the organization and administration of the league in its early years. After the 1906 earthquake that devastated much of the league, McCredie used his own resources to maintain the operation of other clubs. McCredie also invested heavily in his own team and was the first owner to build grandstand seating for the team's fans.

== Member of Congress and return to baseball ==
McCredie was elected as a Republican to the Sixty-first Congress to fill the vacancy caused by the death of Francis W. Cushman and served from November 2, 1909, to March 3, 1911. He was an unsuccessful candidate for renomination in 1910 to the Sixty-second Congress. He resumed his interest in the Portland club of the Pacific Coast League, serving as president until 1921, when he retired. He continued the practice of law in Portland until his death in that city on May 10, 1935. He was interred in Lincoln Memorial Cemetery.

== See also ==
- McCredie Springs, Oregon

== Sources ==
- United States Congress. "William Wallace McCredie (id: M000384)". Biographical Directory of the United States Congress.

U.S. House of Representatives
Preceded by Francis W. Cushman	Member of the U.S. House of Representatives from Washington's 2nd congressional district November 2, 1909 - March 3, 1911	Succeeded by Stanton Warburton
