= Walter McCredie =

American baseball player (1876–1934)

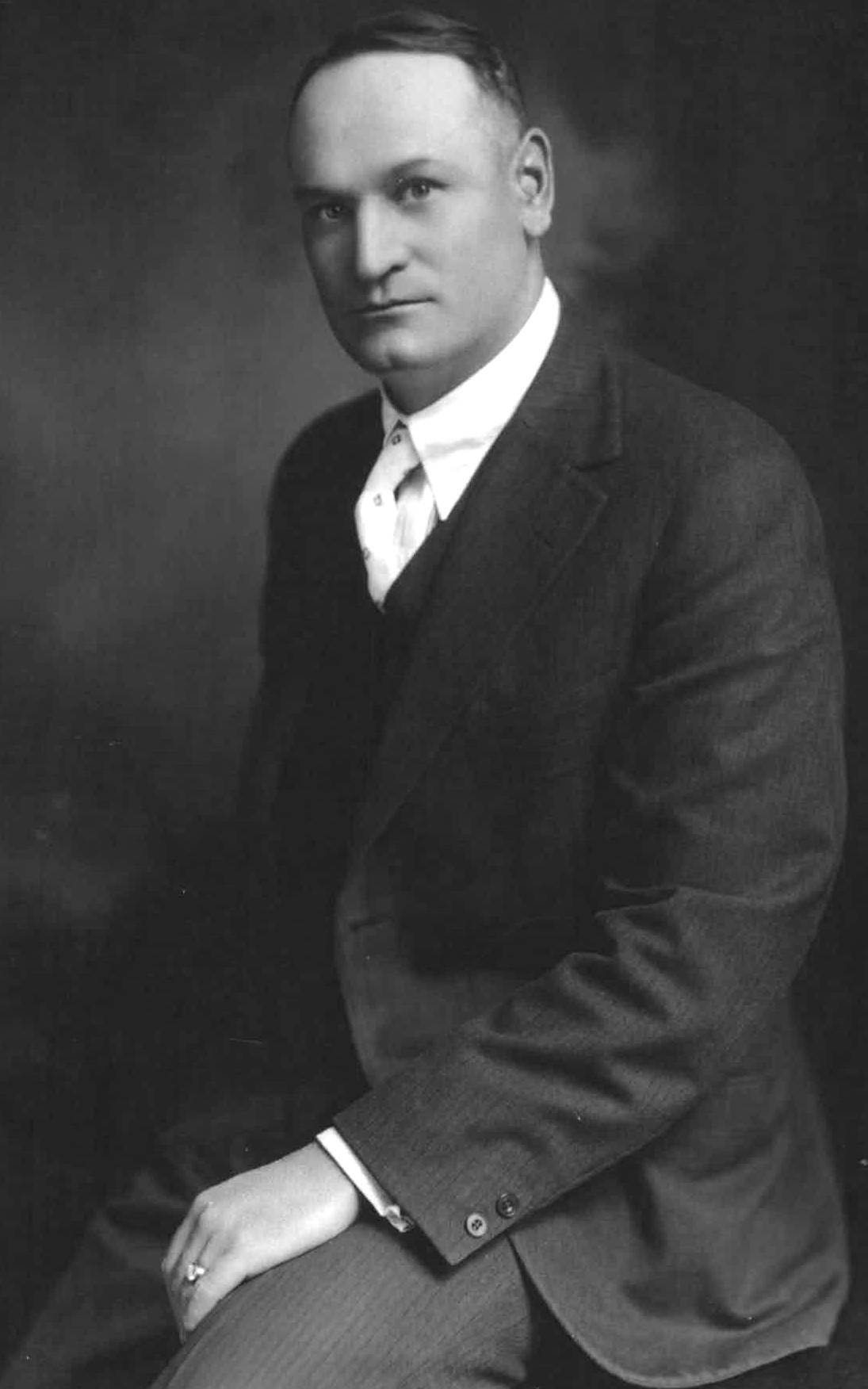
- Outfielder
- Born: November 9, 1876; Manchester, Iowa, U.S.
- Died: July 29, 1934 (aged 57); Portland, Oregon, U.S.
- Batted: Left Threw: Right

MLB debut
- April 17, 1903, for the Brooklyn Superbas

Last MLB appearance
- June 27, 1903, for the Brooklyn Superbas

MLB statistics
- Batting average: .324
- Home runs: 0
- Runs batted in: 20
- Stats at Baseball Reference

Teams
- Brooklyn Superbas (1903)

Walter Henry McCredie (November 9, 1876 – July 29, 1934) was an American professional baseball outfielder and manager. McCredie played for the Brooklyn Superbas of the National League and managed in the minor leagues for 18 seasons, mostly for the Portland Beavers of the Pacific Coast League (PCL).

McCredie began his professional baseball career in 1897. He earned a law degree in 1900, intending to transition into a career as a lawyer, but chose to continue in baseball instead. He played for the Superbas for part of the 1903 season and joined Portland in 1904. He became their player-manager in 1905. McCredie managed Portland for 17 seasons and also managed the Salt Lake City Bees of the PCL for one season. He was posthumously inducted into the PCL Hall of Fame.

== Early life and education ==
McCredie was born in Manchester, Iowa, on November 9, 1876. Raised in Manchester, he played sandlot baseball as a youth and for his high school's baseball team.

McCredie earned his law degree from Drake University in 1900. Expecting to pursue a career in law, he instead played baseball.

== Baseball career ==
=== Early career ===
McCredie made his professional baseball debut with the Des Moines Prohibitionists of the Western Association in 1896. He returned there in 1897. In the 1898 season, he played for Quincy in the Western Association. McCredie played for the Youngstown Little Giants of the Interstate League in 1899, but broke his leg sliding into a base, which ended his season. McCredie began the 1900 season with the New Castle Quakers of the Interstate League and also played for the Sioux City Cornhuskers of the Western Association. He played for the Minneapolis Millers of the Western League for the 1901 season and played for the Oakland Clamdiggers of the California League in 1902. McCredie led the California League with a .319 batting average.

After the 1902 season, the Brooklyn Superbas of the National League signed McCredie. He played in 56 games for Brooklyn in 1903, with a .324 batting average, until the Superbas traded McCredie, Hughie Jennings, Hughie Hearne, and Bill Pounds to the Baltimore Orioles of the International League for Jack Hayden on July 3. McCredie finished the 1903 season with Baltimore.

=== Portland Beavers ===
McCredie played for the Portland Beavers of the Pacific Coast League (PCL) in 1904. After the 1904 season, McCredie and his uncle, William Wallace McCredie (known as "Judge McCredie"), bought Beavers for $9,000 ($314,967 in current dollar terms). He named Walter the team's player-manager and gave Walter full authority for team personnel, while he ran the business. McCredie continued to play for Portland until the 1912 season and managed Portland for 17 seasons. Portland won PCL championships under McCredie in the 1906, 1910, 1911, 1913, and 1914 seasons. As manager, McCredie was credited with the development of Dave Bancroft, Roger Peckinpaugh, Charlie Hollocher, Lu Blue, Billy Southworth, and Babe Pinelli. Portland entered into an informal working arrangement with the Cleveland Naps of the American League in 1909, which provided Portland with young prospects to develop into major league players. Also, Judge McCredie established the Portland Colts, a Class B Northwestern League that operated as a Beavers farm team. In 1915, McCredie was offered the managerial position with Cleveland, but he declined the job to stay with Portland.

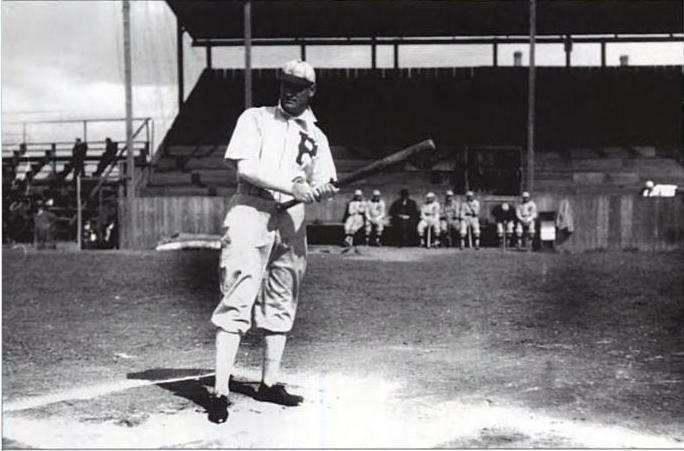
McCredie with the Portland Beavers

While serving as manager, McCredie consistently tested baseball's unwritten rule of barring African Americans and certain minorities from organized professional baseball. McCredie often arranged for Negro league baseball teams to play against the Beavers in spring training. After the 1914 season, McCredie signed Lang Akana, who was born in Hawaii and of Chinese descent. According to The Oregonian several Pacific Coast League players said they would boycott games if Akana played for the Beavers. McCredie released Akana after a few weeks, but told The Oregonian that "I don't think the color of skin ought to be a barrier in baseball ... Here in the Pacific Coast League we have a Mexican and a Hawaiian and yet the laws of baseball bar Negroes from organized diamonds ... The crack Negro ballplayer should not be thus discriminated against. He is welcome in nearly every other branch of athletics."

After losing money on the Portland Colts, Judge McCredie sold the team during the 1914 season, and its new owner moved the team out of Portland. The informal relationship between the Beavers and Cleveland ended after the 1915 season. Due to the mobilization of the United States home front during World War I, the PCL played a shortened schedule for the 1918 season and dropped Portland from the league for the year. McCredie managed the Salt Lake City Bees of the PCL for the 1918 season. Though McCredie indicated that he would return to manage the Bees for the 1919 season in December 1918, Portland returned to the PCL in 1919, and McCredie returned to Portland. The Beavers finished in second-to-last place in the 1919 season, and finished in last place in the 1920 and 1921 seasons.

=== Later career ===
In July 1921, Judge McCredie announced that he would consider offers to sell the Beavers. After the 1921 season, McCredie stepped down as manager and the McCredies sold the team to William Klepper for $150,000 ($2,644,310 in current dollar terms). McCredie was named manager of the Seattle Indians of the PCL for the 1922 season. He was fired in June 1922 and replaced by Bert Adams. Later in 1922, he became a scout for the Detroit Tigers of the American League. As a scout, he discovered Carl Hubbell, but Detroit cut him after a few seasons in the minor leagues.

After the 1925 season, McCredie was hired to manage the Vernon Tigers, a PCL team affiliated with Detroit. The team was sold and relocated, becoming the Mission Bells, and the new ownership retained McCredie to manage in Mission in 1926. McCredie resigned from Mission in May 1926 due to poor health, but he continued to scout for the Tigers. He coached the Hollywood Stars of the PCL during spring training in 1927. McCredie retired from his job with Detroit in 1931 and returned to Portland.

McCredie came out of retirement to manage the Beavers for the 1934 season. He was limited by his poor health and was fired at the end of April, with George Burns taking his place as manager.

== Personal life ==
McCredie married Etta Reitz, a native of Portland, on February 8, 1912.

McCredie's health declined in 1934. Vean Gregg, Irv Higginbotham, Gus Fisher, Carl Mays, and other players set up a benefit game for McCredie. McCredie died on July 29, 1934, one day before the benefit game. Proceeds for the game went to his widow.

In 1943, McCredie was named to be one of the inaugural members of the PCL Hall of Fame.
