= Buddy Ryan (baseball) =

American baseball player (1885-1956)

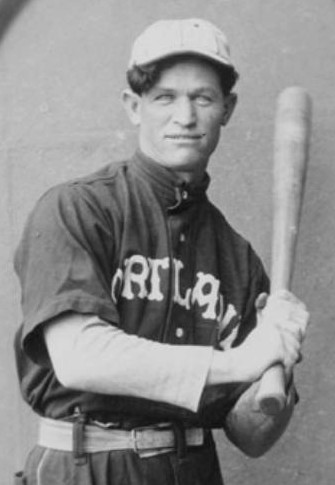
- Outfielder
- Born: October 6, 1885; Denver, Colorado, U.S.
- Died: July 9, 1956 (aged 70); Sacramento, California U.S.
- Batted: Left Threw: Right

MLB debut
- April 11, 1912, for the Cleveland Naps

Last MLB appearance
- October 5, 1913, for the Cleveland Naps

MLB statistics
- Batting average: .282
- Home runs: 1
- Runs batted in: 63
- Stats at Baseball Reference

Teams
- Cleveland Naps (1912–1913)

John Budd Ryan (October 6, 1885 – July 9, 1956) was an American Major League Baseball outfielder who played for two seasons. He played for the Cleveland Naps from 1912 to 1913, playing in 166 career games. He managed the Sacramento Senators of the Pacific Coast League from 1924 to 1932 and later managed the Portland Beavers in 1935, the Wenatchee Chiefs in 1946 and 1947 and the Spokane Indians in 1948.

Ryan died at a hospital in Sacramento, California on July 9, 1956 after being ill for several years.
