= Bill Steen =

American baseball player (1887–1979)

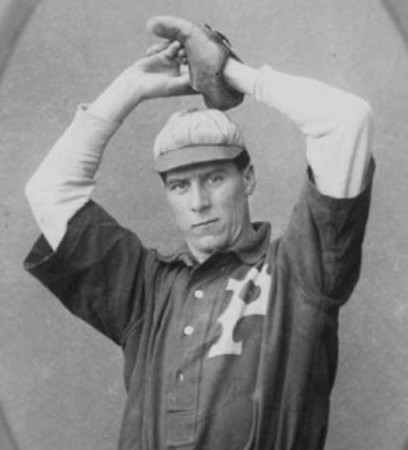
- Pitcher
- Born: November 11, 1887; Pittsburgh, Pennsylvania, U.S.
- Died: March 13, 1979 (aged 91); Signal Hill, California, U.S.
- Batted: Right Threw: Right

MLB debut
- April 15, 1912, for the Cleveland Naps

Last MLB appearance
- July 21, 1915, for the Detroit Tigers

MLB statistics
- Win–loss record: 28–32
- Earned run average: 3.05
- Strikeouts: 265
- Stats at Baseball Reference

Teams
- Cleveland Naps (1912–1915); Detroit Tigers (1915)

William John Steen (November 11, 1887 – March 13, 1979) was an American baseball player. He played professional baseball as a right-handed pitcher for 12 years from 1907 to 1917 and 1919, including four years in Major League Baseball with the Cleveland Indians (1912–1915) and Detroit Tigers (1915). He appeared in 108 major league games and compiled a 28–32 win–loss record with a 3.05 earned run average (ERA) and 265 strikeouts.

== Early years ==
Steen was born in Pittsburgh, Pennsylvania, in 1887. Steen attended Washington & Jefferson College in Washington, Pennsylvania, before playing professional baseball.

== Professional baseball ==
=== Minor leagues ===
Steen began playing professional baseball for a team in Emlenton, Pennsylvania. In 1907, he was signed by the Toledo Mud Hens who farmed him to the New Castle Nocks of the Ohio-Pennsylvania League. On July 15, 1907, he pitched two complete games in a double-header for New Castle and won both games, allowing only three hits in the second game. He accomplished the feat again on July 27, 1907, pitching 12 innings in the first game and allowing only four hits in the second game. He reportedly pitched and won seven double-headers, including four shutout games, and finished his first season in professional baseball with a 17–16 record.

Steen continued to play in the minor leagues for the Toledo Mud Hens in 1908. He won his first six games for Toledo, but he became ill and finished with a 12–10 record. He moved on in 1909 to Grand Rapids where his record was 10-10 and then to the Bloomington Bloomers where he was 18–15.

=== Portland Beavers ===
During the 1910 and 1911 seasons, Steen played for the Portland Beavers in the Pacific Coast League (PCL). He had the best seasons of his career, posting a 27–17 record with a 1.78 ERA in 1910 and a 30–15 record with a 2.36 ERA in 1911. While playing with Portland, Steen's pitchers included a knuckleball and a spitter.

=== Cleveland Indians ===
Steen debuted with the Cleveland Indians on April 15, 1912, and compiled a 23–31 record in four seasons with the team. Steen was Cleveland's #4 starter in 1912, but suffered a broken wrist in 1913.

=== Detroit Tigers ===
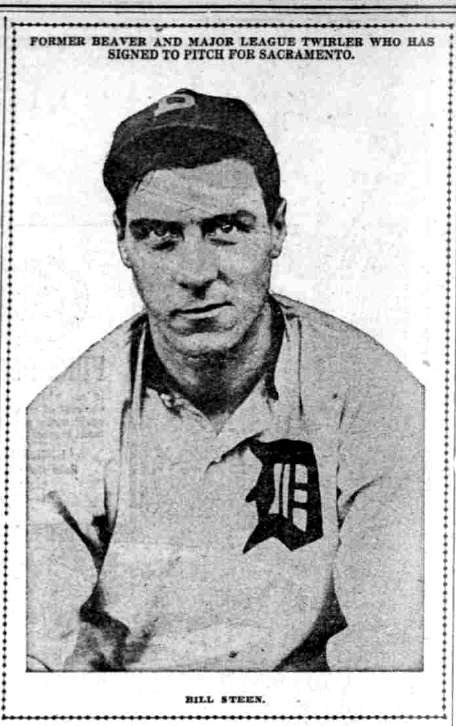
Steen with the Tigers.

In June 1915, the Detroit Tigers were in a tight pennant race with the Boston Red Sox and needed pitching help. They purchased Steen from the Indians. Steen played in 20 games for the 1915 Tigers (including seven as a starter), compiling a record of 5–1 with a 2.72 ERA (Adjusted ERA+ of 111) in 79.3 innings pitched. The 1915 Tigers wound up winning 100 games (the best record in the team's history) but finished in second place to the Red Sox who won 101 games. Steen pitched his last major league game on August 22, 1915.

=== Pacific Coast League ===
Although his major league career ended in August 1915, Steen continued to pitch in the Pacific Coast League for the San Francisco Seals from 1915 to 1917 and for the Oakland Oaks in 1919. He compiled a 10–5 record and a 1.54 ERA for the 1915 Seals team.

== Later years ==
Steen died in Signal Hill, California at age 91 in 1979.
