= Shostakovich v. Twentieth Century-Fox Film Corp. =

1948 New York court decision on moral rights

- Court: New York Supreme Court
- Full case name: Dmitry Shostakovich et al. v. Twentieth-Century Fox Film Corporation
- Decided: June 7, 1948
- Citations: 196 Misc. 67, 80 N.Y.S.2d 575 (N.Y. Sup. Ct. 1948).

Case history
- Appealed to: New York Supreme Court, Appellate Division, First Department
- Subsequent action: Affirmed: 275 A.D. 692, 87 N.Y.S.2d 430 (N.Y. App. Div. 1949).

Case opinions
- No clear legal standard to adjudicate direct injury to moral rights of authors. Right to use public domain works outweighs moral rights of authors. No privacy right in use of name of author where work used is in public domain. No injunction for libel where work used is in public domain.

Shostakovich v. Twentieth Century-Fox Film Corp. is a landmark 1948 New York Supreme Court decision that was the first case in United States copyright law to recognize the theory of moral rights in authorship. The Shostakovich case was brought following the United States premiere of The Iron Curtain, a 1948 spy film and the first anti-Soviet Hollywood film of the Cold War era. The film featured the music of several Soviet composers: Dmitri Shostakovich, Sergei Prokofiev, Aram Khachaturian, and Nikolai Myaskovsky.

The composers—as nominal plaintiffs standing in for the Soviet government, according to some scholars—sued the film's distributor, Twentieth Century-Fox Film Corporation, in the New York Supreme Court, the state's trial court. Conceding that their compositions were in the public domain under United States law, the composers sought an injunction prohibiting further distribution of the film. The composers relied on several legal theories, most notably that they had moral rights in authorship preventing the misuse of their works in a manner that contradicted their beliefs. The court rejected the composers' arguments, holding that the standard for adjudicating moral rights was not settled law and that, in any event, moral rights conflict with the right of the public to use public domain works. The Soviet government continued to press the composers' moral rights case before the French courts, which ruled in their favor in Société Le Chant du Monde v. Société Fox Europe and Société Fox Americaine Twentieth Century.

Legal commentators have described the case as a landmark decision and noted that it is representative of United States courts' reactions to moral rights. The decision has been criticized as a misunderstanding of moral rights and praised for upholding the right of the public to use public domain works over the rights of authors to censor uses that they disagree with.

== Background ==
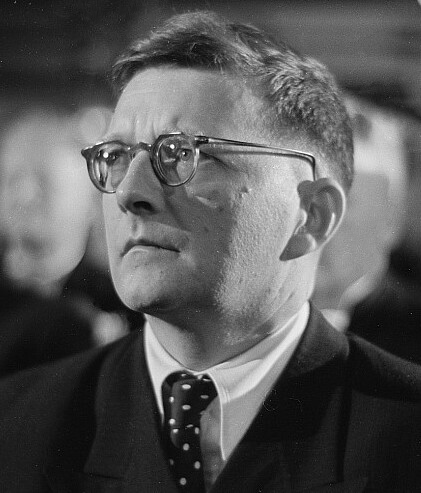
Soviet composer Dmitri Shostakovich, a plaintiff in Shostakovich v. Twentieth Century-Fox Corp.

The Iron Curtain, a spy film based on the 1945 defection of Igor Gouzenko from the Soviet Union to Canada, premiered on May 12, 1948, in New York City, to mostly positive reviews, modest box office returns, and the protests of left-wing organizations. The film, distributed by Twentieth Century-Fox Film Corporation, was the first Cold War production of the United States film industry.

The film's soundtrack was conducted by Alfred Newman and solely featured the works of several famous Soviet composers: Dmitri Shostakovich, Aram Khachaturian, Sergei Prokofiev, and Nikolai Myaskovsky. The soundtrack included excerpts from the third and fourth movements of Shostakovich's Symphony No. 5; the first movement of his Symphony No. 6; the "Lullaby" from Khachaturian's ballet Gayane; the third movements from Prokofiev's Symphonies Nos. 1 and 5; and Myaskovsky's Symphony No. 21.

The film used the composers' music in approximately 45 of the film's 87 minutes and showed a character placing a recording of Shostakovich's Symphony No. 5 on a phonograph. (Note: Shostakovich, 196 Misc. at 68.) The opening credits also contained the following statement: "Music from selected works of the Soviet Composers, Dmitry Shostakovich, Serge Prokofieff, Aram Katchaturian [sic], Nicolai Miashovsky [sic], conducted by Alfred Newman."

In advance of The Iron Curtain's release, the Soviet government and their allies, as well as the composers, opposed the film. From 1947 to 1948, pro-Soviet organizations attempted to persuade Fox president Spyros Skouras and the Motion Picture Association of America to pull the film. Upon the film's release, pro-Soviet organizations organized protests, accusing the film of being pro-war. On April 1, 1948, in a letter to the editors of Izvestia, the composers wrote that the filmmakers, whom they called "American reactionaries", had stolen their music. That month, Helen Black—head of Preslit, the Soviet Union's arts distribution and copyright agency in the United States which was associated with VOKS, the Soviet Union's international cultural exchange organization—attempted to stop the filmmakers from using the composers' music. When Black learned that Fox had sought a license to use the music from publisher Leeds Music, she advised Leeds that the composers would object. Leeds asked Black to send a telegram from the composers formalizing their objections; Black asked Soviet officials to organize a telegram, but did not receive a response. During the month of April, Black and Fox also consulted attorneys. Black's lawyer advised her that Fox could likely use the music, notwithstanding whether they obtained a license. Fox's counsel determined that although the law supported their position, there was a limited chance that they would not prevail in court. Leeds ultimately declined to issue the license and Fox proceeded with distributing the film.

== Case history and the composers' arguments ==
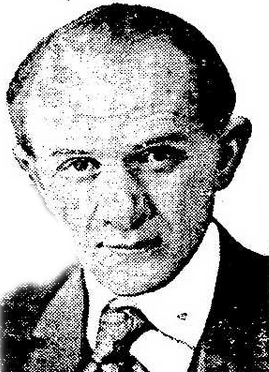
Charles Recht, attorney for the plaintiffs

In May 1948, before the film's release, the attorney Charles Recht—who had previously served as the Soviet Union's representative to the United States—filed suit against Fox on behalf of Shostakovich, Khachaturian, Prokofiev, and Myaskovsky. Recht sought both a temporary and permanent injunction prohibiting distribution of The Iron Curtain. The law professor Mira T. Sundara Rajan has suggested that the composers were nominal plaintiffs and that the suit was brought at the behest of the Soviet government, which wanted to censor the film outright. The historian Kiril Tomoff traced Black's papers through the Soviet bureaucracy and concluded that the Soviet government directed Recht to file a lawsuit; he described the Soviet's legal strategy as "a hubristic willingness to engage the West in the West’s own terms" by asserting the composer's intellectual property rights. The legal scholar André Bertrand and the attorney Alexander Gigante also noted that the composers likely feared the consequences of being associated with the film.

The attorney Philip Adler argued the composers' motion before Justice Edward R. Koch in New York County's trial court, the Supreme Court. Edwin P. Kilroe represented Fox. Justice Koch watched The Iron Curtain with counsel present. (Note: Shostakovich, 196 Misc. at 70.)

At oral argument and in their motion, the composers conceded that the compositions at issue were in the public domain in the United States because the Soviet Union and the United States had not entered into a copyright agreement. They asserted four grounds for issuance of an injunction: (Note: Shostakovich, 196 Misc. at 69.)

1. violation of the right to privacy under Section 51 of the New York Civil Rights Law;
2. defamation of the composers by associating their work with an anti-Soviet stance, implying their disloyalty;
3. deliberate infliction of an injury without just cause; and
4. violation of the composers' moral rights.

According to the law professor Justin Hughes, the privacy claim rested on a right to anonymity and the contention that use of the music constituted a public distortion of the composers' beliefs. Likewise, the defamation claim turned on the composers' protest that the music was being used for a political purpose that they did not agree with.

The composers also asserted a legal theory that was novel in 1940s United States jurisprudence: the moral rights of authors. As of 1948, no United States court had recognized the legal doctrine of moral rights in authorship. European legal systems, by contrast, had recognized the moral right of an author to prevent the distortion of their works. In their briefing, the composers relied on a 1940 Harvard Law Review article, which argued that moral rights had a grounding in United States case law, and they contended that their moral rights were harmed by the political use of their music.

== Decision ==
On June 7, 1948, Justice Koch denied the injunction, rejecting each of the composers' theories. First, the court held that the composers did not have a right of privacy under New York law because those who use public domain works may publish them along with the names of their authors. Second, assuming that it had the authority to issue an injunction for libel under New York law, the court rejected the defamation claim because the composers had failed to prove that the use of their music implied that they supported the message of the film. Specifically, the court held that, unlike copyrighted works—for which the public expects that their authors have consented to their use, probably in exchange for being paid—there cannot be an implication of support when a work is in the public domain and available for use by all.

The court addressed the composers' third and fourth claims together, concluding that their theory of injury "leads inescapably to the Doctrine of Moral Right". The court, assuming moral rights existed in United States law and recognizing that a court could grant a moral rights claim, held that the composers had not shown such a violation because there was no clear standard of adjudication. The court asked: "Is the standard to be good taste, artistic worth, political beliefs, moral concepts or what is it to be?" The court concluded that there was insufficient legal precedent to determine (1) whether moral rights existed, (2) how they interacted with the rights of others, and (3) what should be done to remedy their violation. (Note: Shostakovich, 196 Misc. at 71.) As to the second point, the court held that the public's right to use non-copyrighted works outweighs any moral rights that an author may have.

== Aftermath ==
The court's decision in Shostakovich was widely reported, including on the front page of the Los Angeles Times. According to documents from the Fox archives, one radio columnist said that "the studio couldn't have bought the kind of publicity the Reds handed out on a silver platter".

On appeal, the First Department of the Appellate Division of the New York Supreme Court affirmed in a brief memorandum opinion in 1949. (Note: Shostakovich, 275 A.D. 692.) No further appeal was made to New York's court of last resort, the New York Court of Appeals. In 1953, a French court of appeal (French: cour d’appel) reached the opposite conclusion of the New York Supreme Court in Société Le Chant du Monde v. Société Fox Europe and Société Fox Americaine Twentieth Century. The suit was brought by Société Le Chant du Monde, a French publishing house with ties to the French Communist Party. The Soviet government granted the Société the rights to the composers' music so that it could bring suit against Fox for using the music in The Iron Curtain. The court found in favor of the composers' moral rights, prohibited distribution of the film in France, and awarded damages.

== Legacy ==
Legal commentators have described the Shostakovich decision as a landmark case that typifies the rejection of moral rights claims by United States courts. However, commentators have been divided on whether the court properly determined that using a public domain work without alteration violates an author's moral rights. The law professors Arthur Katz, in 1951, and Sidney Post Simpson and Bernard Schwartz, in 1948, criticized the court for failing to articulate a standard for evaluating moral rights and not recognizing that the composers had a valid claim that their works were being misappropriated to support a political stance that they disagreed with. In a 1953 paper, Arthur L. Stevenson Jr. contested those arguments, stating that moral rights protect authors' rights in individual works, rather than the interpretation of those works. Likewise, in 1955 William Strauss stated that the court correctly concluded that use of a public domain work does not imply support on behalf of its author and that composers should not be allowed to censor the use of their music based on their political views. Mira T. Sundara Rajan wrote in 2011 that the court properly weighed the interest in a free public domain against authors' moral rights.

== See also ==
- Culture during the Cold War
- Music of the Soviet Union
- Soviet espionage in the United States
- Dastar Corp. v. Twentieth Century Fox Film Corp. – United States Supreme Court decision rejecting moral rights in authorship

== Sources ==
=== Case law ===
- Shostakovich v. Twentieth Century-Fox Film Corp., 196 Misc. 67, archived from the original on June 21, 2026, 80 N.Y.S.2d 575 (N.Y. Sup. Ct. 1948) – via Courtlistener.
- Shostakovich v. Twentieth Century-Fox Film Corp., 275 A.D. 692, 87 N.Y.S.2d 430 (N.Y. App. Div. 1949).

=== Newspapers ===
- "Iron Curtain Action Lost by Composers". Los Angeles Times. United Press. June 8, 1948. p. 1 – via Newspapers.com.
- "Reds Charge Theft of Music for Film". The New York Times. United Press. April 12, 1948. p. 2. ProQuest 108387190.
- "Moscow Broadcasts Protest". The New York Times. United Press. April 12, 1948. p. 2. ProQuest 108386192.
- "Police on Guard at Film Picketing: Anti-War Propaganda, Veteran Groups Are Limited to Four Each at Iron Curtain". The New York Times. May 13, 1948. p. 21. ProQuest 108202163.

=== Books ===
- Baldwin, Peter (2014). The Copyright Wars: Three Centuries of Trans-Atlantic Battle. Princeton University Press. ISBN 978-0-69-116182-2.
- Bertrand, André (2011). "Shostakovich and John Huston: The French Supreme Court on Copyright, Contracts and Moral Rights". In Heath, Christopher; Sanders, Anselm Kamperman (eds.). Landmark Intellectual Property Cases and Their Legacy. Alphen aan den Rijn, Netherlands: Kluwer Law International. pp. 1–12. ISBN 978-90-411-3343-4.
- Sundara Rajan, Mira T. (2011). Moral Rights: Principles, Practice and New Technology. Oxford University Press. doi:10.1093/acprof:osobl/9780195390315.001.0001. ISBN 978-0-19-539031-5.
- Tomoff, Kiril (2011). "'Shostakovich et al.' and The Iron Certain: Intellectual Property and the Development of a Soviet Strategy of Cultural Confrontation, 1948–1949". In Alexopoulos, Golfo; Hessler, Julie; Tomoff, Kiril (eds.). Writing the Stalin Era: Sheila Fitzpatrick and Soviet Historiography. New York: Palgrave Macmillan. pp. 133–155. doi:10.1057/9780230116429_9. ISBN 978-0-230-10930-8.
- Tomoff, Kiril (2015). "Shostakovich and The Iron Curtain: Intellectual Property and Transimperial Integration". Virtuosi Abroad: Soviet Music and Imperial Competition During the Early Cold War, 1945–1958. Ithaca, New York: Cornell University Press. pp. 20–45. doi:10.7591/cornell/9780801453120.003.0002. ISBN 978-0-80-145312-0. JSTOR 10.7591/j.ctt15hvsgx.

=== Journal articles ===
- Anderson, Sarah C. (2006). "Decontextualization of Musical Works: Should the Doctrine of Moral Rights Be Extended?" (PDF). Notes. Fordham Intellectual Property, Media & Entertainment Law Journal. 16 (3): 869–897. ISSN 1079-9699. Archived (PDF) from the original on October 1, 2023.
- DaSilva, Russell J. (1980). "Droit Moral and the Amoral Copyright: A Comparison of Artists' Rights in France and the United States". Bulletin of the Copyright Society of the U.S.A. 28 (1): 1–58. ISSN 0886-3520 – via HeinOnline.
- Forsyth, Hope (2018). "Mutually Assured Protection: Dmitri Shostakovich and Russian Influence on American Copyright Law" (PDF). Tulsa Law Review. 53 (3): 559–580. ISSN 1538-9979. Archived (PDF) from the original on October 1, 2023.
- Gigante, Alexander (1996). "Ice Patch on the Information Superhighway: Foreign Liability for Domestically Generated Content" (PDF). Cardozo Arts & Entertainment Law Journal. 14 (3): 523–562. ISSN 0736-7694. Archived (PDF) from the original on October 1, 2023.
- Goold, Patrick R. (2017). "The Lost Tort of Moral Rights Invasion" (PDF). Akron Law Review. 51 (4): 1093–1124. ISSN 0002-371X. Archived from the original (PDF) on October 1, 2023.
- Grunninger, Cassidy (2016). "A Tale of Two Composers: An Argument for a Limited Expansion of Moral Rights for Composers" (PDF). Notes. Journal of Intellectual Property Law. 24 (1): 165–177. ISSN 2575-3819. Archived (PDF) from the original on October 1, 2023.
- Hughes, Justin (1988). "The Philosophy of Intellectual Property". Georgetown Law Journal. 77 (2): 287–366. ISSN 0016-8092 – via HeinOnline.
- Katz, Arthur S. (1951). "The Doctrine of Moral Right and American Copyright Law—A Proposal". Southern California Law Review. 24 (4): 375–427. ISSN 0038-3910 – via HeinOnline.
- Kwall, Roberta Rosenthal (1985). "Copyright and the Moral Right: Is an American Marriage Possible?" (PDF). Vanderbilt Law Review. 38 (1): 1–101. ISSN 0042-2533. Archived (PDF) from the original on October 1, 2023.
- Leab, Daniel J. (1988). "The Iron Curtain (1948): Hollywood's First Cold War Movie". Historical Journal of Film, Radio and Television. 8 (2): 153–188. doi:10.1080/01439688800260191. ISSN 0143-9685.
- Lee, Mary A. (1950). "Moral Right Doctrine: Protection of the Artist's Interest in His Creation After Sale". Comments. Alabama Law Review. 2 (2): 267–281. ISSN 2162-6812 – via HeinOnline.
- "Moral Right of Artists". Cases Noted. Columbia Law Review. 49 (1): 132–134. 1949. doi:10.2307/1118440. ISSN 0010-1958. JSTOR 1118440.
- Platte, Nathan (2022). "Mixed Motives: Soviet Symphonies and Propagandistic Duplicity in The Iron Curtain (1948)". Music & Politics. 16 (2). doi:10.3998/mp.3109. ISSN 1938-7687. S2CID 251696203. Archived from the original on October 1, 2023.
- Roeder, Martin A. (1940). "The Doctrine of Moral Right: A Study in the Law of Artists, Authors and Creators". Harvard Law Review. 53 (4): 554–578. doi:10.2307/1333995. ISSN 0017-811X. JSTOR 1333995.
- Rossi, John (1994). "The Iron Curtain: A Premature Anti-Communist Film". Film & History. 24 (3–4): 100–112. doi:10.1353/flm.1994.a395812. ISSN 1548-9922. S2CID 193907244. Project MUSE 395812.
- Simpson, Sidney Post; Schwartz, Bernard (1948). "Equity". Annual Survey of American Law. 1948 (3): 642–665. ISSN 0066-4413 – via HeinOnline.
- Stevenson, Jr., Arthur L. (1953). "Moral Right and the Common Law: A Proposal". Copyright Law Symposium. 6. American Society of Composers, Authors and Publishers: 89–117 – via HeinOnline.
- Strauss, William (1955). "The Moral Rights of the Author". American Journal of Comparative Law. 4 (4): 506–538. doi:10.2307/838072. ISSN 0002-919X. JSTOR 838072.
- Zabatta, Patrick G. (1992). "Moral Rights and Musical Works: Are Composers Getting Berned". Syracuse Law Review. 43 (3): 1095–1136. ISSN 0039-7938 – via HeinOnline.
