= Case theory =

Case theory may refer to:

- Grammatical case theory, in grammar
- Case theory (in law)
