= Center for Jewish Law and Contemporary Civilization =

Coordinates: 40°44′5.01″N 73°59′39.02″W

The Center for Jewish Law and Contemporary Civilization at Yeshiva University's Benjamin N. Cardozo School of Law organizes conferences, publishes texts, and supports travel and research by graduate students and senior scholars in the fields of Jewish law, legal and political theory, and ethics.

Suzanne Last Stone, a professor of law at the Benjamin N. Cardozo School of Law, directs the center.

Previously known as the Program in Jewish Law & Interdisciplinary Studies, the center was established at Benjamin N. Cardozo School of Law in 2004. Its mission includes fostering a specifically American contribution to the study of Jewish law, complementing already existing institutions for the study of Jewish law in Israel.

The center's three major areas of focus are:

- academic study of Jewish jurisprudence, comparative law, and legal theory;
- interdisciplinary research of Jewish law, political theory, multicultural studies, and ethics;
- public programming for lay and religious intellectuals, professionals, and officials exploring Jewish law values in general public discourse.
