= Victor Manibo =

Victor Manibo is a Filipino speculative fiction author.

== Biography ==
Manibo was born in Manila. In his 20s, he moved to the United States to attend the Benjamin N. Cardozo School of Law.

The Sleepless, his debut novel, was published in 2022. His second novel, Escape Velocity, was published in 2024. In 2025, he published his first crime novel, Dead Note. Later that year, he published the gothic horror novel The Villa, Once Beloved.
