= Melanie Leslie =

American law scholar

- Born: March 17, 1961 (age 65)
- Education: University of Oregon (BA); Benjamin N. Cardozo School of Law (J.D.)
- Occupations: Law professor Trust & estates scholar Administrator
- Office: Dean of Benjamin N. Cardozo School of Law

Melanie B. Leslie (born March 17, 1961) is the 7th Dean of Benjamin N. Cardozo School of Law. Appointed on July 1, 2015, Leslie is the first Cardozo graduate and the first woman to hold the position. Leslie is the Dr. Samuel Belkin Professor of Law and has been a member of the Cardozo faculty since 1996, teaching Property, Trust and Estates, Nonprofit Governance and Evidence. Her areas of research include trusts and estates law. During her tenure, Leslie provided oversight for the creation of several programs at Cardozo, including the FAME Center for fashion, art, media and entertainment law, the Center for Rights and Justice, and the Center for Real Estate Law & Policy.

== Personal ==
Leslie received her B.A. in 1983 from the University of Oregon and her J.D., magna cum laude, in 1991 from Benjamin N. Cardozo School of Law. She was executive editor of the Cardozo Law Review. Before joining Cardozo's faculty, she clerked for Justice Gary S. Stein of the New Jersey Supreme Court. She practiced commercial litigation at Debevoise & Plimpton, Cleary Gottlieb Steen & Hamilton, and McCarter & English.

== Selected publications ==
- "Estates and Trusts : Cases and Materials," Foundation Press/ Thomson Reuters (2011) Co-authored with Cardozo Professor Stewart Sterk
- "The Wisdom of Crowds? Groupthink and Nonprofit Governance," 62 Florida Law Review 1179 (2009)
- "Trusting Trustees: Fiduciary Duties and the Limits of Default Rules," 94 Georgetown Law Journal 67 (2005)
