= Law and Literature (journal) =

- Discipline: Law and literature
- Language: English

Publication details
- Former names: Cardozo Studies in Law and Literature
- Publisher: Taylor & Francis on behalf of Cardozo Law School (United States)

Standard abbreviations
- ISO 4: Law Lit.

Indexing
- ISSN: 1535-685X
- JSTOR: lawliterature

Law and Literature, formerly Cardozo Studies in Law and Literature, is a law journal of the Cardozo Law School founded in 1988. The managing editor is Professor Peter Goodrich. First published in 1989 as a biannual titled Cardozo Studies in Law and Literature, with its first issue devoted to Herman Melville's Billy Budd, Sailor, this journal shifted to a triannual format in 2002. First published by the Benjamin N. Cardozo School of Law and then by Taylor & Francis, it is one of the few journals in the country entirely focused on the interdisciplinary movement known as law and literature. Issues in private law and public law, restrictions on creative expression, gender and racial bias, hermeneutics (interpretive methodologies), and legal themes in works of literature are among the journal's regular topics.
