= San Diego Padres =

Major League Baseball franchise in San Diego, California

- 2026 San Diego Padres season

Logo	Cap insignia
- Established in 1969

Major league affiliations
- National League (1969–present); West Division (1969–present)

Current uniform
- Retired numbers: 6; 19; 31; 35; 51; 42

Colors
- Brown, gold, white

Name
- San Diego Padres (1969–present)

Nicknames
- The Pads; The Friars; Slam Diego Padres; Slam Diego

Ballpark
- Petco Park (2004–present); San Diego Stadium (1969–2003) (Note: Known as San Diego Stadium from 1967 to 1980, Jack Murphy Stadium from 1980 to 1997, and Qualcomm Stadium from 1997 to 2017.)

Major league titles
- World Series titles (0): None
- NL pennants (2): 1984; 1998
- West division titles (5): 1984; 1996; 1998; 2005; 2006
- Wild card berths (5): 2020; 2022; 2024; 2025; 2026

Front office
- Principal owners: José E. Feliciano & Kwanza Jones
- President of baseball operations: A. J. Preller
- General manager: A. J. Preller
- Manager: Craig Stammen
- Mascot: Swinging Friar
- Website: mlb.com/padres

The San Diego Padres are an American professional baseball team based in San Diego. The Padres compete in Major League Baseball (MLB) as a member club of the National League (NL) West Division. The team plays its home games at Petco Park in downtown San Diego. Founded in 1969 as an expansion franchise, the Padres adopted their name from the Pacific Coast League (PCL) team that arrived in San Diego in 1936. The name, Spanish for "fathers", honors the friars of the Franciscan order who founded Mission San Diego de Alcalá in 1769.

In 1976, Randy Jones achieved the first Cy Young Award for the Padres. In the 1980s, Tony Gwynn became a major star, winning eight National League batting titles. Under manager Dick Williams, the Padres clinched their first NL pennant, only to lose to the Detroit Tigers in the 1984 World Series in 5 games. In 1995, Kevin Towers became general manager; under his lead, Ken Caminiti became the first Padres player to win the MVP Award. The Padres achieved their second NL pennant alongside Trevor Hoffman, only to be swept by the New York Yankees in the 1998 World Series.

The Padres are owned by José E. Feliciano & Kwanza Jones, who have owned the team starting in 2026. The team has won two NL pennants, in 1984 and 1998, losing in the World Series both years, and are the oldest team never to have won the World Series. As of the 2026 season, the Padres have had 20 winning seasons in franchise history. Despite reaching the postseason seven times from 2005 to 2026, the team has yet to return to the World Series. From 1969 through 2026, the Padres have an overall record of 4,308–4,860–2 (.470).

== History ==
The Padres adopted their name from the San Diego Padres of the Pacific Coast League (PCL), a minor league team that arrived in San Diego in 1936 and won the PCL title in 1937, led by 18-year-old Ted Williams, the future Hall of Famer who was a native of San Diego.

In 1969, the Padres joined the ranks of Major League Baseball as one of four new expansion teams, along with the Montreal Expos (now the Washington Nationals), the Kansas City Royals, and the Seattle Pilots (now the Milwaukee Brewers).

One of its earliest owners was C. Arnholt Smith, a prominent San Diego businessman and former owner of the PCL Padres. Despite initial excitement, the guidance of longtime baseball executives, Eddie Leishman and Buzzie Bavasi, as well as a new stadium, the team struggled: the Padres finished in last place in each of its first six seasons in the National League West, losing 100 games or more four times. One of the few bright spots on the team during the early years was first baseman and slugger Nate Colbert, an expansion draftee from the Houston Astros and was the long-time home run leader until 2024, when Manny Machado overtook him.

The team's fortunes gradually improved as they won five National League West titles and reached the World Series twice, in 1984 and in 1998, but lost both times. The Padres' main draw during the 1980s and 1990s was Hall of Famer Tony Gwynn, who won eight NL batting titles.

In 1990, then-owner Joan Kroc tried to give the franchise to the city of San Diego, but dropped the proposal after a baseball owners’ committee declined to consider the plan.

They moved into their current stadium, Petco Park, in 2004.

On August 20, 2020, the Padres became the first team in MLB history to hit a grand slam in four consecutive games earning the nickname, "Slam Diego Padres".

Until 2021, the Padres were the only MLB franchise that had yet to throw a no-hitter. The record was broken on April 9, 2021, as Joe Musgrove accomplished the feat against the Texas Rangers, finally ending the longest no-hit drought by a team in MLB history. On September 5, 1997, Andy Ashby took a no-hitter into the ninth inning, which was previously the closest that the team had come to achieving this feat. In 2024, Dylan Cease threw a no-hitter against the Nationals on July 25.

On November 14, 2023, Peter Seidler, who owned the Padres since 2012, died at the age of 63. MLB owners approved of John Seidler as the Padres' control person on February 6, 2025. In April 2026, a sale was finalized for the Padres to be sold to José E. Feliciano for $3.9 billion.

On May 2, 2026, the Padres announced a sale to Feliciano and Kwanza Jones, which the MLB approved on August 17 and was formally announced on August 24.

== Postseason history ==
Year	Wild Card ^{[A]}		NLDS ^{[B]}		NLCS		World Series	
1984	None (Won NL West)				Chicago Cubs	W (3–2)	Detroit Tigers	L (1–4)
1996	None (Won NL West)		St. Louis Cardinals	L (0–3)				
1998	None (Won NL West)		Houston Astros	W (3–1)	Atlanta Braves	W (4–2)	New York Yankees	L (0–4)
2005	None (Won NL West)		St. Louis Cardinals	L (0–3)				
2006	None (Won NL West)		St. Louis Cardinals	L (1–3)				
2020	St. Louis Cardinals	W (2–1)	Los Angeles Dodgers	L (0–3)				
2022	New York Mets	W (2–1)	Los Angeles Dodgers	W (3–1)	Philadelphia Phillies	L (1–4)		
2024	Atlanta Braves	W (2–0)	Los Angeles Dodgers	L (2–3)				
2025	Chicago Cubs	L (1–2)						
2026	Chicago Cubs	W (2–0)	Milwaukee Brewers	L (1–3)				

1. ^{↑}The wild-card round was first played in 2012 and expanded for the 2020 season.
2. ^{↑}The National League Division Series was first played in 1981 and added permanently in 1995.

== Championships ==
The Padres are one of two teams in the National League West that have never won the World Series, though they have made and lost both appearances as the National League pennant winner in 1984 and 1998.

== Achievements ==
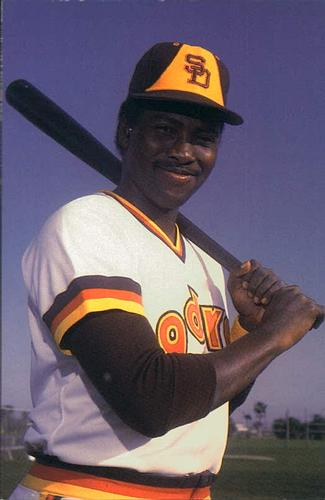
Tony Gwynn, Hall of Famer

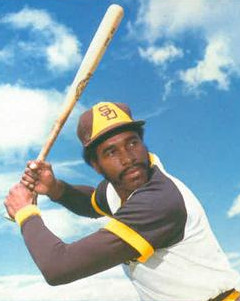
Dave Winfield, Hall of Famer

=== Baseball Hall of Famers ===
The following elected members of the Baseball Hall of Fame played or managed for the Padres.

San Diego Padres Hall of Famers
Affiliation according to the National Baseball Hall of Fame and Museum
San Diego Padres

Roberto Alomar
Rollie Fingers
Goose Gossage

**Tony Gwynn** *
Rickey Henderson
**Trevor Hoffman** *

Greg Maddux
Willie McCovey
Fred McGriff

Gaylord Perry
Mike Piazza
Ozzie Smith

Dick Williams
**Dave Winfield**

- Players and managers listed in **bold** are depicted on their Hall of Fame plaques wearing a Padres cap insignia.
- * San Diego Padres listed as primary team according to the Hall of Fame

=== Ford C. Frick Award recipients (broadcasters) ===
San Diego Padres Ford C. Frick Award recipients
Affiliation according to the National Baseball Hall of Fame and Museum

**Jerry Coleman +**

Dick Enberg

- **Names in bold** received the award based primarily on their work as broadcasters for the Padres.
- * Played as Padres
- + Managed the Padres

=== Retired numbers ===
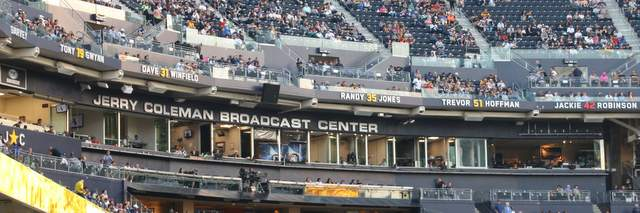
Numbers retired by the Padres displayed in the Ring of Honor above the press box at Petco Park during the 2016 season

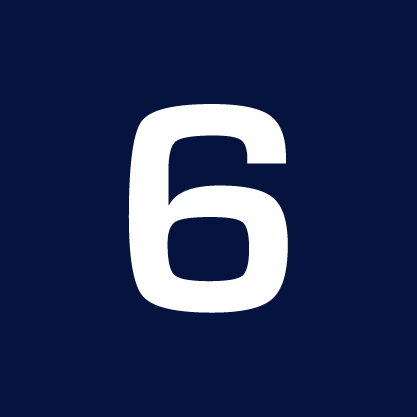
Steve
Garvey
1B
Retired April 16, 1988
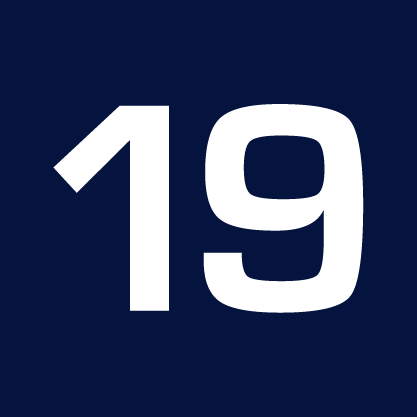
Tony
Gwynn
RF
Retired September 4, 2004
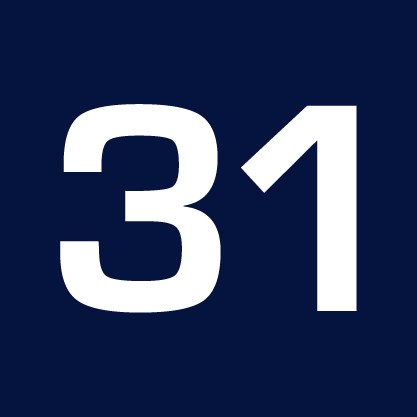
Dave
Winfield
RF
Retired April 14, 2001
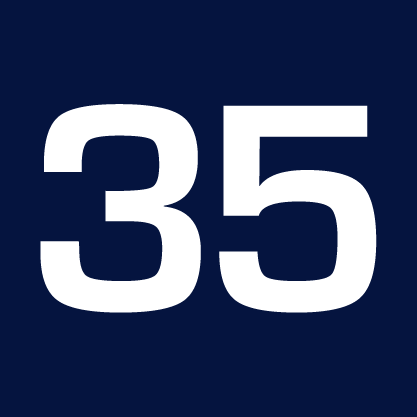
Randy
Jones
P
Retired May 9, 1997
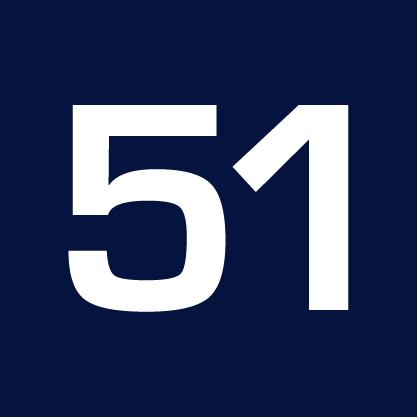
Trevor
Hoffman
P
Retired August 21, 2011
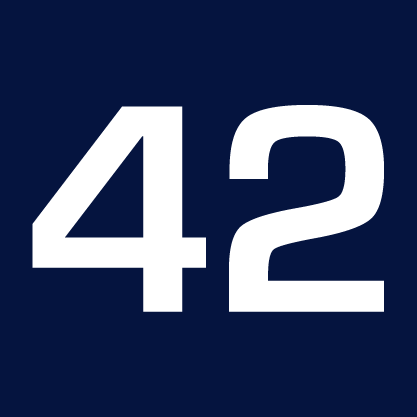
Jackie
Robinson
All MLB
Honored April 15, 1997

The Padres have retired six numbers. The numbers are commemorated in a display at Petco Park's entrance at Home Plate Plaza. Fans are allowed to pose for pictures next to the aluminum numbers, which are 3 feet 11 inches (1.19 m) high, 5 1/3 feet (1.6 m) wide, and 1 foot (0.30 m) deep. Originally, the numbers were atop the batter's eye in center field, until they were relocated in 2016. The numbers were not ready for display in time for the park's opening in 2004, but they were unveiled midseason. (Note: Jackie Robinson's number was unveiled on July 3, while those of Dave Winfield, Randy Jones and Steve Garvey were unveiled on August 20.) Also beginning in 2016, the numbers are displayed in the Ring of Honor on the upper deck façade above the press box behind home plate.

In 1988, Steve Garvey was the first player to have his number retired by the Padres. He played only five seasons with San Diego, but hit the game-winning two-run home run in the bottom of the ninth inning against the Chicago Cubs in Game 4 of the 1984 National League Championship Series (NLCS), tying the series before the Padres won the next day. He was named the NLCS Most Valuable Player, and San Diego advanced to their first World Series. In 2016, The San Diego Union-Tribune ranked Garvey's Game 4 homer as the No. 1 moment in San Diego sports history. However, he played 14 of his 19 seasons with the rival Los Angeles Dodgers, where he was also more productive, and the retirement of his number by San Diego has been heavily debated.

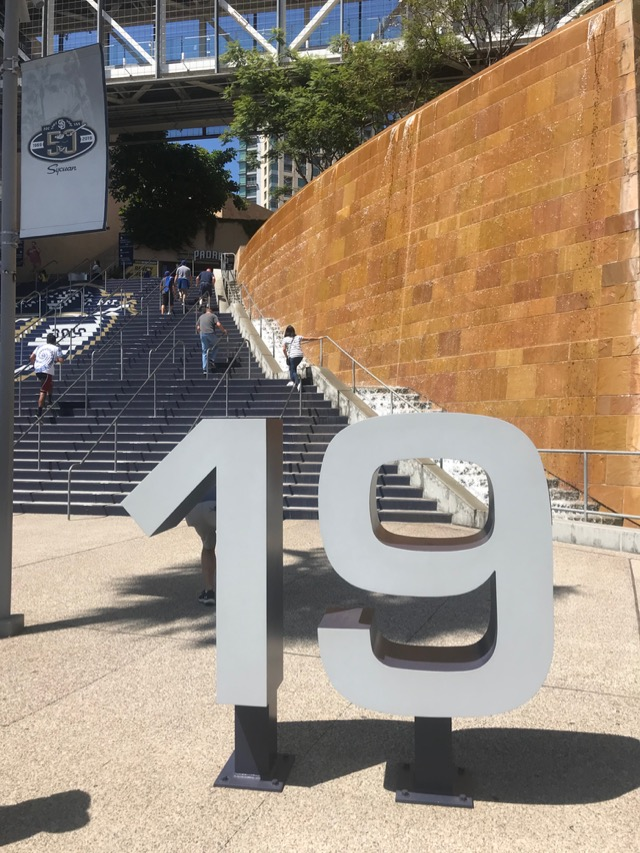
Gwynn's retired No. 19 displayed at Petco Park.

On April 15, 1997, exactly 50 years after Jackie Robinson broke the baseball color line, the No. 42 he wore with the Brooklyn Dodgers was retired throughout Major League Baseball. Later that year, Randy Jones's No. 35 was retired by the Padres. He was a two-time All-Star (1975, 1976) and the club's first Cy Young Award winner in 1976. On the day his number was retired, the Union-Tribune wrote that Jones was "the most popular athlete in the history of this city" during the mid-1970s. Dave Winfield was next to have his number, 31, retired in 2001, when he was also inducted into the Baseball Hall of Fame. His retirement ceremony also celebrated his decision to be the first member of the Hall of Fame to have his plaque depicting him wearing a Padres cap. Winfield played for six teams in his 22-year career, spending his first eight seasons in San Diego. In 2004, the Padres retired No. 19 in honor of Gwynn, who is widely considered the greatest Padres player ever. He played his entire 20-year career with San Diego and won an NL-record eight batting titles. The most recent number to be retired was Trevor Hoffman's No. 51 in 2011. He had retired from playing after 2010, when he left the game as MLB's career leader in saves with 601, including 552 with the Padres.

Prior to moving to Petco, the team played at San Diego Stadium, where the retired numbers were originally displayed on banners hanging from the light towers above the left field stands. However, Garvey's number was commemorated instead on the wall behind the spot in right-center field where his winning home run in the 1984 NLCS cleared the fence, but the number disappeared when the stadium was expanded in 1997 and the location was masked by an overhang. It reappeared in 2002 when all the retired numbers were moved and inscribed on the outfield fence.

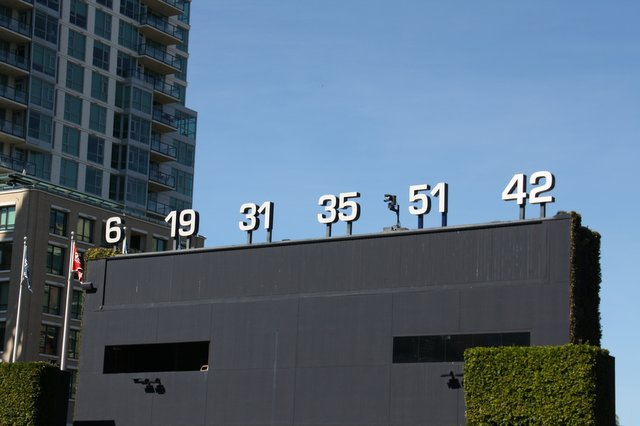
Retired numbers were displayed atop the batter's eye at Petco Park until 2016

The Padres also have a "star on the wall" in honor of broadcaster Jerry Coleman, in reference to his trademark phrase "Oh Doctor! You can hang a star on that baby!" Nearby the initials of the late owner Ray Kroc are also displayed. Both the star and the initials are painted in gold on the front of the pressbox down the right-field line accompanied by the name of the person in white. Kroc was honored in 1984, Coleman in 2001.

On March 23, 2024, the team held a public memorial and celebration of life for team owner Peter Seidler, who died in November 2023. The club honored his memory with his initials of "PS" inside a gold heart next to Coleman's memorial on the front of the pressbox down the right-field line.

=== Padres Hall of Fame ===
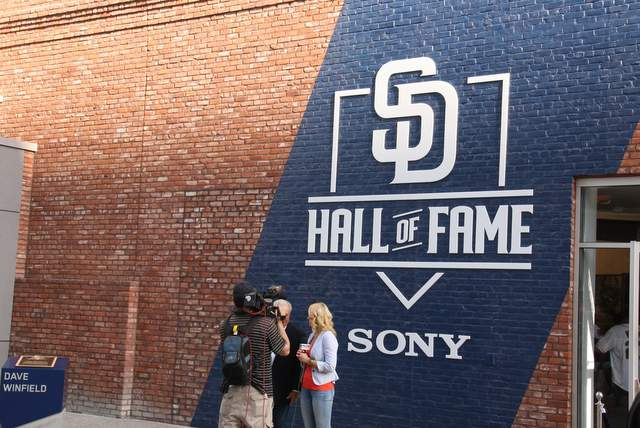
Opening of Padres Hall of Fame at Petco Park on July 1, 2016

The following 16 people have been inducted into the San Diego Padres Hall of Fame since it was founded in 1999.

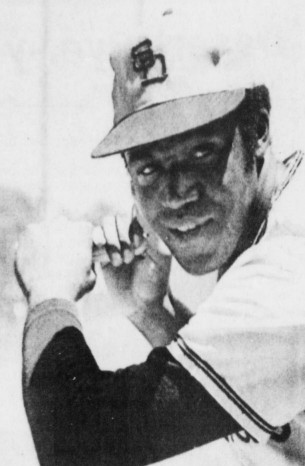
Nate Colbert

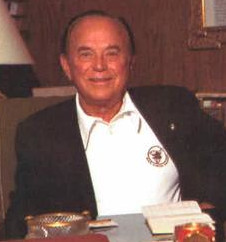
Ray Kroc

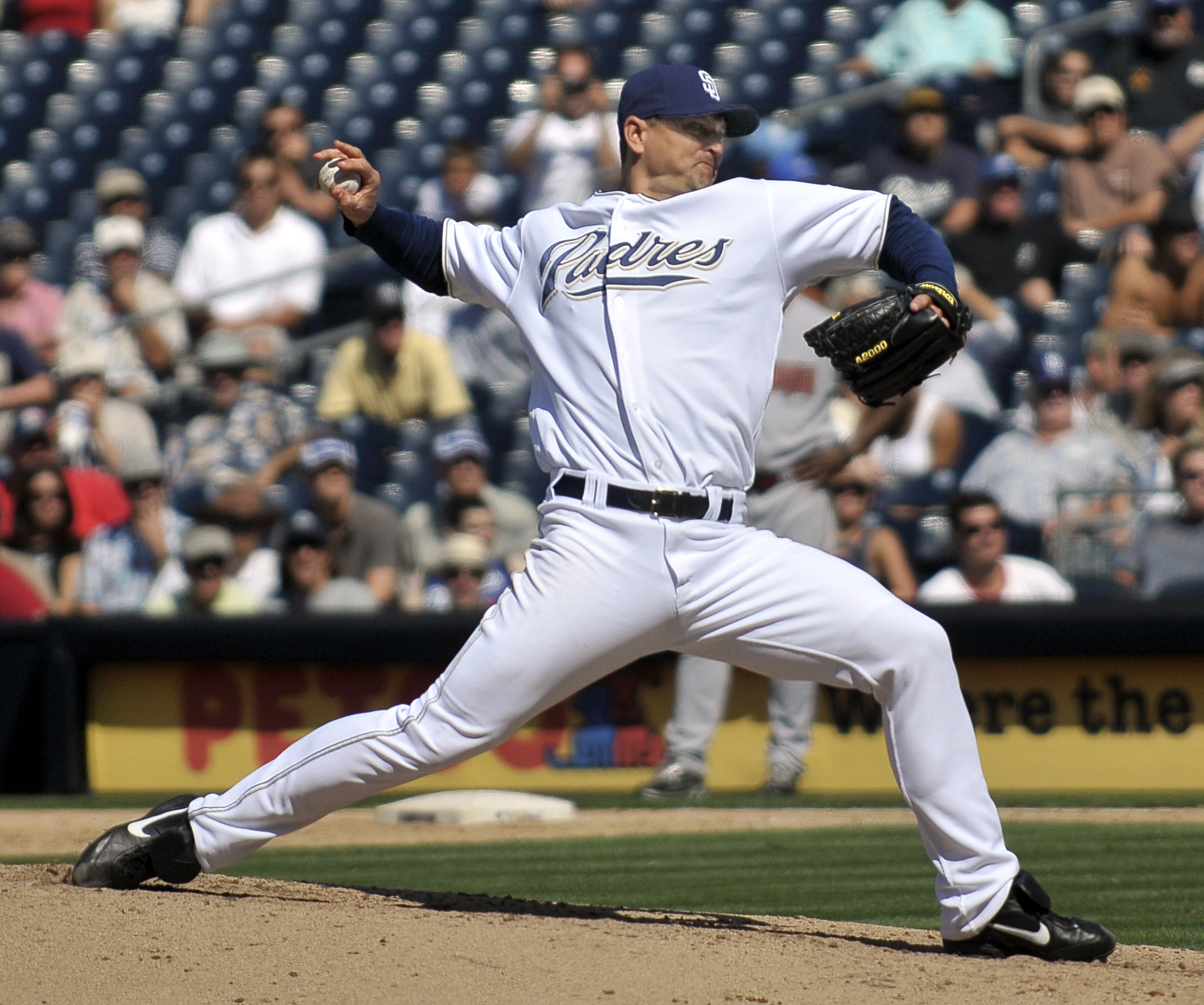
Trevor Hoffman

Inducted	Year officially inducted
Name	Name of inductee
Position	Player position or other role of inductee
Years	Years with the San Diego Padres
No.	Jersey number with Padres (players only)
*	Member of National Baseball Hall of Fame and Museum
^	Number retired by the Padres
†	Posthumously inducted

Inducted	Name	Position	Years	No.	Ref
1999	Randy Jones	Pitcher	1973–1980	35^	
1999	Nate Colbert	First baseman	1969–1974	17	
1999	Ray Kroc†	Owner	1974–1984	–	
2000	Dave Winfield*	Outfielder	1973–1980	31^	
2001	Buzzie Bavasi	President	1969–1977	–	
2001	Jerry Coleman	Announcer / Manager	1972–2013	2	
2002	Tony Gwynn*	Outfielder	1982–2001	19^	
2009	Dick Williams*	Manager	1982–1985	23	
2014	Trevor Hoffman*	Pitcher	1994–2008	51^	
2015	Benito Santiago	Catcher	1986-1992	9, 09	
2015	Garry Templeton	Shortstop	1982–1991	1	
2016	Ted Williams†*	Outfielder	1936–1937 (Note: Played for the minor league Padres in the PCL, never played for the major league Padres)	19	
2016	Ken Caminiti†	Third baseman	1995–1998	21	
2017	Jack McKeon	General manager / Manager	1980–1990	15	
2018	Kevin Towers†	General manager	1995–2009	—	
2022	Larry Lucchino	President / CEO	1995–2001	—	
2022	Ted Leitner	Broadcaster	1980–2020	—	
2023	Jake Peavy	Pitcher	2002–2009	44	
2023	John Moores	Owner	1994–2009	—	

=== San Diego Hall of Champions ===
Gwynn, Winfield, Fingers, Gossage, Randy Jones, and Graig Nettles (3B, 1984–1987) are members of the San Diego Hall of Champions, which is open to athletes native to the San Diego area (such as Nettles) as well as to those who played for San Diego teams (such as Gwynn).

**Padres in the San Diego Hall of Champions**
No.	Player	Position	Tenure	Notes
—	Buzzie Bavasi	Team President	1969–1977	
1	Garry Templeton	SS	1982–1991	
3	Alan Trammell	Coach	2000–2002	Elected mainly on his performance with Detroit Tigers
4	Bob Skinner	Coach; Manager	1970–1973; 1977	Born in La Jolla
7	Tony Clark	1B	2008	Elected mainly on his performance with Detroit Tigers
8, 10	Dave Roberts	OF; Coach; Manager	2005–2006; 2011–2015	Raised in San Diego
9	Graig Nettles	3B	1984–1987	Born and raised in San Diego, attended San Diego State
19	Ted Williams	LF	1936–1937 (PCL)	Elected mainly on his performance with Boston Red Sox, born and raised in San Diego
19	Tony Gwynn	RF	1982–2001	Attended San Diego State
31	Dave Winfield	RF	1973–1980	
33	David Wells	P	2004, 2006–2007	Elected mainly on his performances with Toronto Blue Jays and New York Yankees, grew up in Ocean Beach, San Diego
34	Rollie Fingers	P	1977–1980	Elected mainly on his performance with Oakland A's
35	Randy Jones	P	1973–1980	
51	Trevor Hoffman	P	1993–2008	
54	Goose Gossage	P	1984–1987	

== Roster ==
San Diego Padres 2027 spring training roster
40-man roster		Non-roster invitees	Coaches / other
Pitchers: 76 Jhony Brito; 56 Jeremiah Estrada; -- Luis Gutierrez; 68 Kyle Hart; 59 Garrett Hawkins; 78 Bryan Hoeing; 1 Yuki Matsui; 22 Mason Miller; 66 David Morgan; 44 Joe Musgrove; 58 Wandy Peralta; 72 Bradgley Rodríguez; 39 JP Sears; 63 Hunter Stratton; 98 Randy Vásquez	Catchers: 12 Luis Campusano; 48 Rodolfo Durán; 54 Freddy Fermin; 8 Ethan Salas; Infielders: 2 Xander Bogaerts; 9 Jake Cronenworth; 13 Manny Machado; 18 Mason McCoy; 30 Gavin Sheets; 24 Sung-mun Song; 99 Gage Workman; Outfielders: 4 Jase Bowen; 29 Dustin Harris; 3 Jackson Merrill; 23 Fernando Tatís Jr.; 0 Samad Taylor; Designated hitters: 7 Will Wagner		Manager: 14 Craig Stammen; Coaches: 86 Heberto Andrade (bullpen catcher/coaching assistant); 88 Chris Apecechea (assistant pitching); 81 Morgan Burkhart (major league coaching assistant); 82 Brian Esposito (major league coach); 53 Ben Fritz (bullpen); 81 Ryan Goins (infield); 70 Robby Hammock (field coordinator); 20 Bob Henley (third base/infield and base running instructor); 49 Randy Knorr (bench); 46 David Macias (first base/outfield and base running instructor); 89 Mike McCoy (assistant hitting); 57 Ruben Niebla (pitching); 85 Pat O'Sullivan (assistant hitting); 82 Kevin Plawecki (catching); 80 Nick Punto (major league coach); -- Scott Servais (coaching assistant); 28 Steven Souza Jr. (hitting); 87 Scott Stroud (coaching assistant); 83 Peter Summerville (game planning/coaching assistant); Restricted list: 11 Yu Darvish; 32 active, 0 inactive, 0 non-roster invitees; 7-, 10-, or 15-day injured list; * Not on active roster; ^{†} Suspended list; Roster, coaches, and NRIs updated November 2, 2026; Transactions • Depth chart; → All MLB rosters

== Minor league affiliates ==
The San Diego Padres farm system consists of seven minor league affiliates.

Class	Team	League	Location	Ballpark	Affiliated
Triple-A	El Paso Chihuahuas	Pacific Coast League	El Paso, Texas	Southwest University Park	2014
Double-A	San Antonio Missions	Texas League	San Antonio, Texas	Nelson W. Wolff Municipal Stadium	2021
High-A	Fort Wayne TinCaps	Midwest League	Fort Wayne, Indiana	Parkview Field	1999
Single-A	Lake Elsinore Storm	California League	Lake Elsinore, California	Lake Elsinore Diamond	2001
Rookie	ACL Padres	Arizona Complex League	Peoria, Arizona	Peoria Sports Complex	2021
Rookie	DSL Padres Brown	Dominican Summer League	Boca Chica, Santo Domingo	San Diego Padres Complex	2023
Rookie	DSL Padres Gold	Dominican Summer League	Boca Chica, Santo Domingo	San Diego Padres Complex	2023

== Logos and colors ==
Cap logo from 1969 to 1984. The cap was originally brown for the first four Padre seasons before it was switched to yellow with brown panels. Orange was added in 1980.

Throughout the team's history, the San Diego Padres have used multiple logos, uniforms, and different color combinations.

=== 1969–1979: Original brown & gold ===
Their first logo in 1969 depicted a friar swinging a bat with Padres written at the top while standing in a sun-like figure with San Diego Padres on the exterior of it. The "Swinging Friar" has popped up on the uniform on and off ever since. Although the "Swinging Friar" is no longer used as the primary logo, it remains as the mascot of the team and is now used as an alternate logo and on the uniform sleeve.

Brown and gold were the Padres' original colors. The team's first uniforms featured a cream base for the home uniforms and a tan base for the road uniforms. Brown letters with gold trim adorned the uniforms, which featured the team name in front of both designs. A second tan uniform, this time with the city name, was used as a road alternate before becoming the primary in 1971. Caps were all-brown with the gold "SD", though the team later broke out an alternate gold cap with a brown brim and "SD" letters.

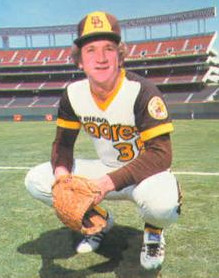
Randy Jones in 1978

Switching from flannel to polyester in 1972, the Padres radically changed their uniforms. The team wore all-gold uniforms and pants regardless of road or home games, with the only difference being the road uniform emblazoned with the city name and the home uniform with the team name. The Padres also broke out a new brown cap, complete with a gold front panel and a brown "SD", which would remain for the next several years. The gold front panel was shaped as a bell, alluding to the bells in historic missions in California.

In 1974, the Padres returned to wearing traditional uniforms. The home design now had a script "Padres" lettering in front, with the road design keeping much of the original aesthetic. Chest numbers were also added. In 1976, the Padres ditched the buttons in favor of pullovers for their home uniform. In addition, they went with a brown uniform top for road games, featuring gold sleeves and gold letters.

The brown uniforms served as a template for the Padres' next uniform set beginning in 1978. The home uniforms now featured brown sleeves and gold letters, and a gold alternate with brown sleeves and letters was also released. The full team name, which was written in a more futuristic font, was emblazoned in front while the swinging friar logo was added to the left sleeve. However, this set only lasted for that season, as the Padres tweaked its design the next season. The updated design removed the swinging friar logo while returning to the team name/city name dynamic for home and road games respectively. The gold uniforms were also retired.

=== 1980–1984: Brown, gold, & orange ===
Steve Garvey in 1983

In 1980, the Padres added orange to the palette. The team's next uniform set removed the contrasting colored sleeves and chest numbers, and orange was added to the letters and striping of the home uniforms and trim and striping of the road uniforms. The caps were also updated to feature orange trim on the "SD" and within the gold panel. In 1984, the Padres added the initials "RAK" on the left sleeve in honor of Ray Kroc, who had owned the team since 1974.

=== 1985–1990: Brown & orange pinstripes ===
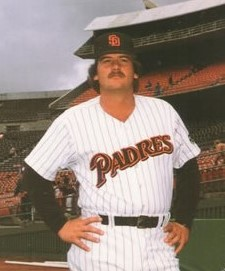
LaMarr Hoyt in 1985

In 1985, the Padres switched to using a script-like logo in which Padres was written sloped up. That would later become a script logo for the Padres. The team's colors were changed to brown and orange and remained this way through the 1990 season. In 1989, the Padres took the scripted Padres logo and put it in a gray ring that read "San Diego Baseball Club" with a striped center.

That same year, the Padres returned to wearing traditional buttoned uniforms designed by Sidjakov Berman & Gomez. The home uniforms featured the script "Padres" in front while the road uniforms had the "SD" emblazoned on the left chest. Brown letters with orange trim and brown pinstripes adorned both uniforms. The "RAK" initials remained until 1986. An all-brown cap with the orange "SD" was used with the uniform.

=== 1991–2003: Blue & orange ===
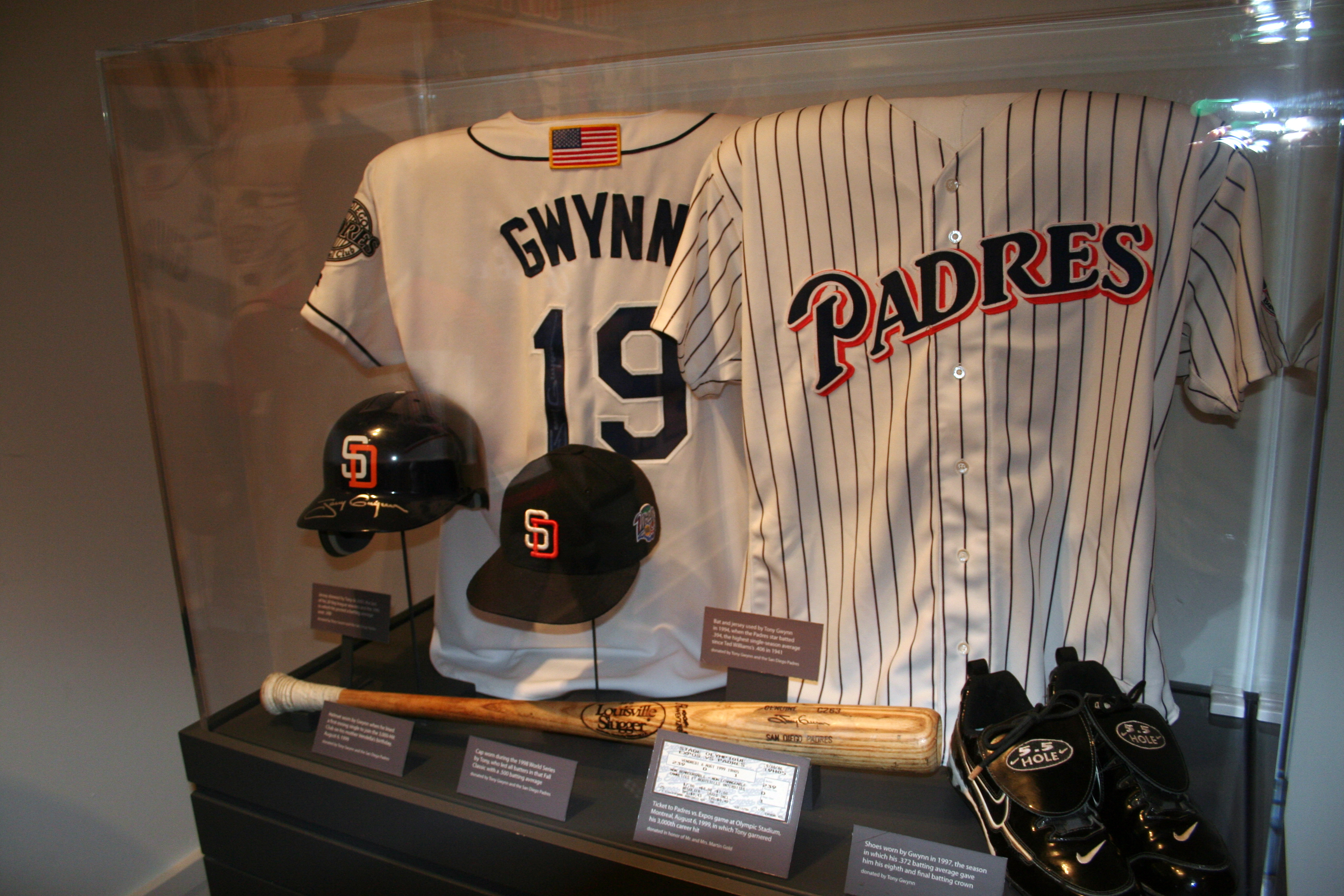
The Tony Gwynn exhibit in 2007, featuring the 1994 home and 2001 alternate Padres uniform.

In 1991, the Padres logo was updated. The color of the ring was changed to silver, and the Padres script was changed from brown to blue. The logo only lasted one year, as the Padres changed their logo for the third time in three years, again by switching colors of the ring. The logo became a white ring with fewer stripes in the center and a darker blue Padres script with orange shadows and they also wearing blue pin stripes. In 1991, the team's colors were also changed, to a combination of orange and navy blue.

The home uniform kept the pinstripes but was changed to navy blue, which was also implemented on the letters. The road uniforms eliminated the pinstripes and added the city name in navy blue block letters with white trim and orange drop shadows. A navy cap with the "S" in white and "D" in orange was used with the uniform. The team logo was added on the left sleeve in 1996.

The Padres unveiled a navy blue alternate uniform in 1997, featuring the team name in front written in navy blue with orange drop shadows. Other features included orange numbers at the back and white piping along the chest, neck and sleeves. White chest numbers were added in 1999. Initially, the swinging friar logo was added to the left sleeve, but was removed after the 1998 season in favor of the team's primary logo which lasted until the 2000 season.

The following year, the Padres began wearing an alternate home white uniform which bore the same features as the primary home uniform minus the pinstripes and orange trim. Navy blue piping was also added. An alternate navy cap with the white "SD" was used with the uniform. This uniform became the primary in 2001, after which the pinstriped uniforms were retired following that season.

=== 2004–2015: Blue & sand ===
The logo was completely changed when the team changed stadiums between the 2003 and 2004 seasons, with the new logo looking similar to home plate with San Diego written in sand font at the top right corner and the Padres new script written completely across the center. Waves finished the bottom of the plate. Navy remained but a sandy beige replaced orange as a secondary color. The team's colors were also changed, to navy blue and sand brown. In 2009, the San Diego was removed from the top right corner of the logo.

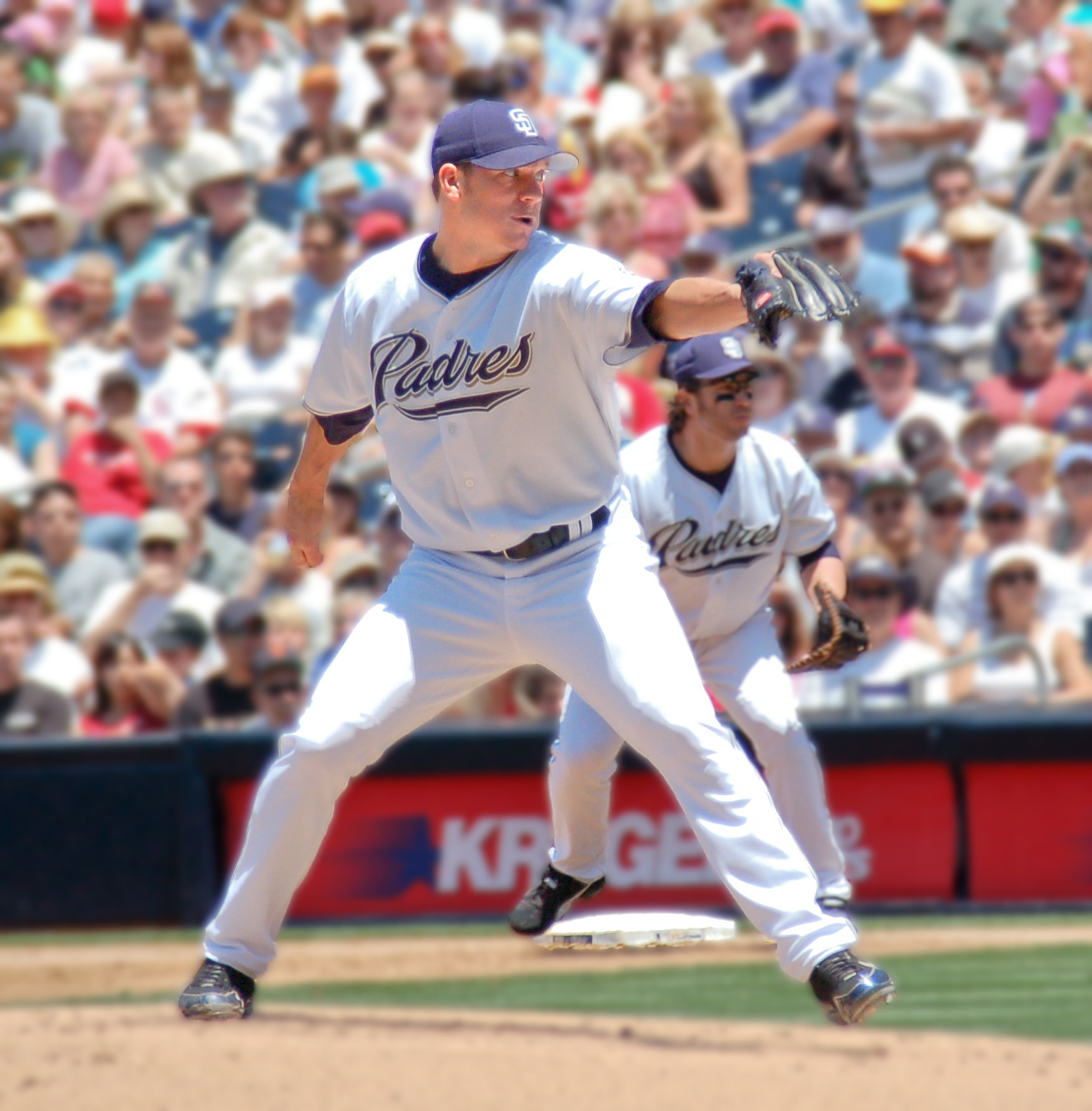
Jake Peavy in 2006

For the next seven seasons the Padres were the only team in Major League Baseball that did not have a grey jersey. On the road, the team wore sand uniforms with the city name in front. The home design featured the updated "Padres" script in navy with sand drop shadows. Both uniforms featured the primary logo on the left sleeve. The alternate blue uniform featured the same "Padres" script in sand, and the swinging friar logo was added to the left sleeve. The Padres continued to wear their primary navy cap at home, while on the road they went with a second navy cap with "SD" in sand.

In 2011, the Padres' road uniform was changed to a grey base, and the navy and sand caps were used exclusively with the navy alternates. After the season, the alternate navy cap was retired.

For the 2012 season, the Padres unveiled a new primary logo, featuring the cap logo inside a navy blue circle with the words "San Diego Padres Baseball Club" adorning the outer circle. The "swinging friar" logo was recolored navy blue and white and was added to the left sleeve of the home uniform. Another secondary logo features the Padres script carried over from the previous year's primary logo below the depiction of Petco Park in sand and above the year of the team's first season (EST. 1969); this design was added to the team's road and navy alternates. While the home uniforms kept the sand trim, the road and navy alternates did not. In addition, the "SD" replaced "Padres" in front of the navy alternates, and the city name wordmark on the road uniforms was updated. All uniforms also added piping around the chest, neck and sleeves.

=== 2016–2019: Blue & white ===
In the 2016 season, the Padres wore a navy blue and gold color scheme, similar to the one used on the 2016 All-Star Game logo. The home uniform was patterned similarly to the alternate navy uniforms, with gold trim accenting the piping and letters. An alternate navy cap with the "S" in white and "D" in gold was also used with the uniform. To coincide with the change, the Padres added a new brown and gold alternate uniform to be worn mostly during Friday home games, along with an updated gold-paneled brown cap.

For the 2017 season, the Padres revealed a new color scheme and new jerseys for the second straight year. The gold was scrapped from the home uniform and the team reverted to a navy blue-and-white combo. The word Padres returned to the front of the home uniform, but with a new script, while the script on the road uniform reverted to the San Diego wordmark style it used from 2004 to 2011. Both uniforms also added the "SD" logo on the left sleeve. The navy blue alternates remained intact minus the left sleeve patch. Despite this major change, the brown and gold alternate uniform from the previous set was retained, with the addition of the "SD" on the left sleeve.

=== 2020–present: Return to brown & gold ===
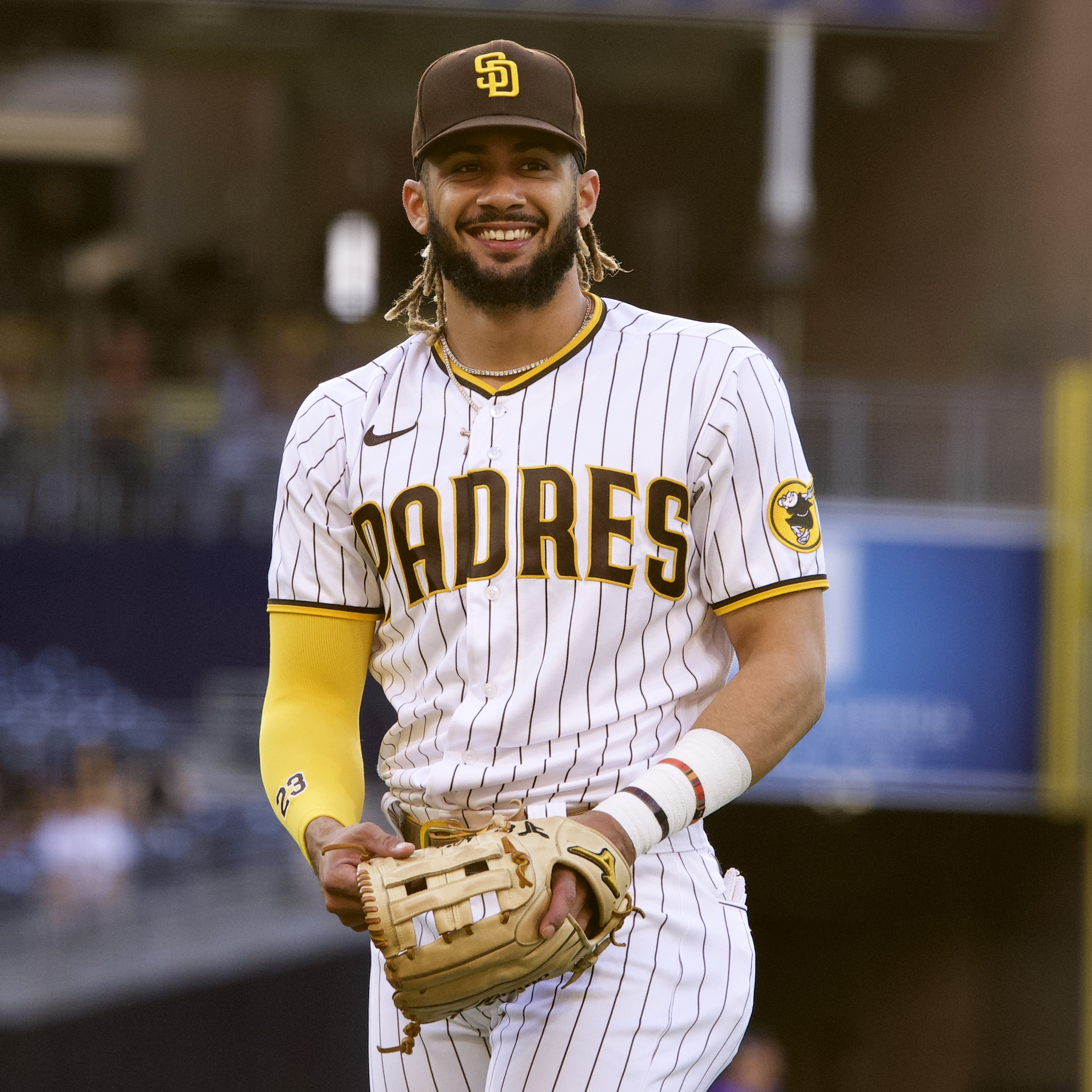
Fernando Tatís Jr. wearing the brown and gold home uniform that was introduced prior to the 2020 season

The club announced in January 2019 that the original brown and gold colors would return for the 2020 season. The new uniform designs featuring the brown and gold colors were officially unveiled on November 9. The team featured brown and gold on each of the three unveiled jerseys, including the return of pinstripes to the Padre home jersey for the first time since 2001 and a sand-colored road jersey (also with pinstripes) for the first time since 2010. Alternate non-pinstriped sand pants are paired with the brown alternate jersey. The shade of the sand color is noticeably darker than the sand-colored road jerseys worn from 2004 to 2010. An all-brown cap with "SD" in gold was also released. With the uniform change, the San Diego Padres are once again the only team in the league that do not feature grey in their road uniforms.

The return to brown and gold uniforms has coincided with an increase in team merchandise sales, with the Padres ranking in the top 10 in MLB team merchandise sales at U.S. sports retailer Lids during the 2022 season.

==== City Connect ====
In 2022, the Padres joined 13 other teams in wearing Nike's "City Connect" uniforms. The primarily white uniform featured pink, mint green and yellow accents on the letters and sleeves, and has "San Diego" written in a graffiti style. The left mint sleeve contained a recolored version of the "swinging friar" logo in pink and yellow. The all-mint cap featured the pink interlocking "SD" in front. The uniform intended to pay tribute to the San Diego–Tijuana bi-national metropolitan area, highlighting San Diego's long-standing relations with Tijuana in Baja California, Mexico.

On November 2, 2025, to coincide with Dia de los Muertos, the Padres posted a teaser video on their social media platforms featuring WWE superstar, and San Diego native Dominik Mysterio placing a White hat bearing an Orange "S" and Navy Blue "D" and bill on to a traditional Day of the Dead altar. The blue and orange color palette was worn by the Padres between 1991 and 2003, including the franchise's most recent run to the World Series in 1998. The teaser ended with the appearance of a woman wearing traditional Day of the Dead face paint before vanishing to an ad saying "Padres / Nike. City Connect 2.0 Coming April 2026." Unveiled on April 9, 2026, the Padres' second City Connect uniform retained the wordmark of the first edition, but recolored to an obsidian base with bone letters, along with marigold and fireberry sleeve piping. A Day of the Dead-inspired patch was added on the sleeve. Bone pants were worn with this uniform.

== Mascot ==
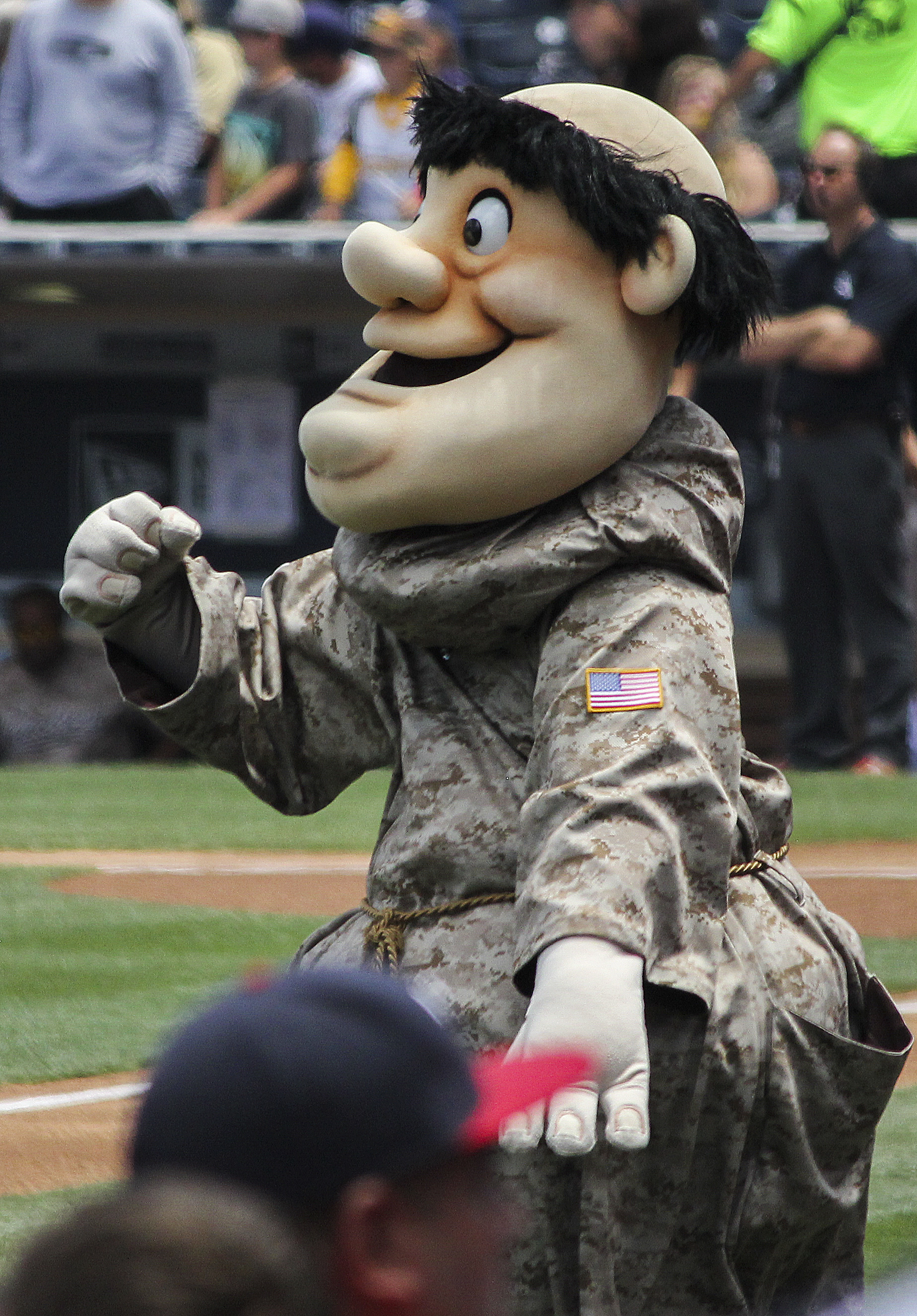
The "Swinging Friar".

The Padres' official mascot is the "Swinging Friar", a pudgy man dressed as a friar with a tonsure, sandals, a dark hooded cloak, and a rope around the waist. He swings a baseball bat and rings a mission bell at home games immediately after a win. He is named and patterned after the Spanish Franciscans, who founded Mission San Diego de Alcalá around which the city of San Diego was established in 1769.

The Swinging Friar was designed by 19-year-old Carlos Hadaway in the 1950s and first appeared on team programs for the 1962 home opener, when the Padres were still a member of the Pacific Coast League, a Minor League Baseball organization. The mascot was retained when the team joined Major League Baseball in 1969. Originally, the Swinging Friar was represented at the ballpark as a real man wearing a friar outfit. Since the 1990s, the character has been a full mascot costume.

The San Diego Chicken has often been mistaken as the Padres' team mascot due to the frequency with which he appears at Padres games. Although he does make appearances at San Diego sporting events, the Famous Chicken is an independent character owned by professional mascot Ted Giannoulas and has never been the official mascot of any San Diego sports team.

== Rivalries ==
=== Divisional ===
==== Los Angeles Dodgers ====
The Padres' historical rivalry against the Los Angeles Dodgers has often been largely lopsided in favor of LA; however, recent growth between the two teams in competition during the 2020s has added intensity on top of proximity between Los Angeles and San Diego (driving from Dodger Stadium to Petco Park can be done by simply taking Interstate 5). San Diego fans have often harbored animosity towards Los Angeles due in small part to San Diego being an unstable home for multiple sports franchises as both the Chargers and the Clippers had relocated to Los Angeles after being unable to secure either a new arena or stable finances in San Diego. Following the relocation of the Chargers to Los Angeles in 2017, the Padres became the only franchise in the four major American professional sports leagues in the San Diego sports market, strengthening the rivalry and San Diego's animosity to Los Angeles sports in general. The Dodgers currently lead the series 504–412, and both teams have met in the post season three times (Los Angeles winning the 2020 NLDS and 2024 NLDS, while San Diego won in 2022). Off the field, the rivalry has been just as competitive, as the two teams have aggressively battled on the trade market and free agency over numerous star players, including a deal that traded for Juan Soto.

=== Interleague ===
==== Seattle Mariners (The Vedder Cup) ====
An unusual rivalry exists between the Padres and the American League's Seattle Mariners. The matchup was designated one of the 15 "naturalized rivalries" when interleague play began in 1997, and the teams have played every year since, except 2017.

Little on the surface links the two teams to any actual hostility, as both play in separate leagues and in cities that sit about 1,250 miles apart. Still, they share a spring training facility—the Peoria Sports Complex in Peoria, Arizona—and in many years have competed for draft picks and prospects after failing to make the playoffs. (The Padres failed to win a single playoff series between 1999 and 2019, while the Mariners failed to make the playoffs from 2002 to 2021.) Far from a bitter rivalry, it is viewed by the teams and most fans as more of a humorous contest.

The rivalry has long been unofficially called the Vedder Cup after Pearl Jam frontman Eddie Vedder, who claims both Seattle and San Diego as hometowns—and who is a known fan of the Chicago Cubs. Starting in 2025, the rivalry was officially recognized as "The Vedder Cup", with the winner of the series being awarded a trophy designed by Vedder himself.

== Military appreciation ==
In 1996, the Padres became the first national sports team to have an annual military appreciation event. In 2000, the Padres began wearing a camouflage jersey to honor the military. Starting in 2008, the Padres began wearing camouflage jerseys for every Sunday home game. The team also wears the uniforms on Memorial Day, Independence Day, and Labor Day. For 2011, the Padres changed the camouflage design to a more modern "digital" design, using the MARPAT design after receiving permission from then-Commandant James Conway, and dropped the green from the lettering and logo of the jersey. Green was replaced by a sand-olive color (also in the cap worn with the jersey). For 2016, to coincide with hosting the 2016 Major League Baseball All-Star Game, the Padres added a second camouflage jersey, this time in navy blue. The Padres alternated the navy camouflage jersey with a Marines style, which were used through 2019. From 2020 to 2023, the Padres used two different camouflage jersey colors: green and sand-olive, both with the current Padres logo.

Since 1995 Marine Recruits from the nearby Marine Corps Recruit Depot often visit the games en masse during Military Appreciation Day, in uniform, often filling entire sections of the upper deck of Petco Park. When present, the team commemorates them with a special Fourth Inning Stretch featuring the Marines' Hymn played by stadium organist Bobby Cressey. Through April 2005 over 60,000 marine recruits were hosted by the Padres. This is part of an extensive military outreach program, which also includes a series of Military Appreciation Night games, and game tapes mailed to deployed United States Navy ships of the Pacific Fleet for onboard viewing (a large portion of the Pacific Fleet is home ported in San Diego). Now, every Sunday home games the Padres play is "Military Sunday".

The San Diego area is home to a number of military installations, including several Navy and Coast Guard bases centered on San Diego Bay, Marine Corps Air Station Miramar (former home of the "Top Gun" training program), and the Marine Corps training ground at Camp Pendleton. Civilians employed at those bases account for around 5% of the county's working population.

== Radio and television ==
As of May 31, 2023, the Padres' regional telecasts are produced by MLB Local Media and distributed via local origination channels on television providers in the team's regional market, as well as an over-the-top subscription service distributed by MLB.tv known as "Padres.tv" Games air on providers such as Cox Cable, Charter Spectrum, DirecTV (including DirecTV Stream and U-verse TV), and FuboTV.

Don Orsillo is the play-by-play announcer, with Mark Grant as color analyst and Bob Scanlan as field reporter. Bally Sports San Diego (formerly Fox Sports San Diego) had assumed the rights to the team in 2012 under a 20-year deal, replacing Cox Cable's 4SD. Amid the chapter 11 bankruptcy of the network's parent company Diamond Sports Group, Bally missed a rights payment to the Padres in May 2023, causing the rights to the Padres to revert to the team; MLB subsequently took over production of the Padres' regional broadcasts, retaining the commentators and contracted employees.

As of the 2021 season, Padres radio broadcasts in English are carried by KWFN 97.3 The Fan, after having previously been carried by sister station 94.9 KBZT upon the acquisition of the radio rights by Entercom in 2017. Jesse Agler is the primary play-by-play announcer, with Tony Gwynn Jr. serving as color analyst. The games are also broadcast in Spanish on XEXX-AM, Radio Ranchito 1420 AM, with Eduardo Ortega, Carlos Hernández and Pedro Gutiérrez announcing. Padre games were also aired from 2006 to 2010 on XHPRS-FM 105.7.

Selected games are broadcast on KFMB, San Diego's CBS affiliate, and its CW-affiliated subchannel. Spanish language telecasts of Sunday games are seen XHAS-TDT channel 33. Until September 2007, Friday and Saturday games were seen in Spanish on KBOP-CA channel 43, until that station changed to an all-infomercial format. English-language Padres over-the-air broadcasts aired through the years on XETV-TV 6, KCST-TV 39, KUSI-TV 51, KFMB-TV 8 and KSWB-TV 69.

John Demott was the Padres' first public address announcer when the team began in 1969. By the late 1970s, Bruce Binkowski had taken over as PA announcer, and became the longest-serving public address announcer in the team's history, remaining until the end of the 1999 season. First DeMott and then Binkowski also were responsible with PA announcing duties for the San Diego Chargers and the San Diego State Aztecs, both of which were joint tenants at Qualcomm Stadium with the Padres until the Padres moved into Petco Park. From Petco Park's opening in 2004 until 2013, the PA announcer was Frank Anthony, a radio host with 105.7 XHPRS-FM. On April 19, 2014, Alex Miniak was announced as the new Public Address announcer for the San Diego Padres. Miniak was formerly the PA announcer for the New Hampshire Fisher Cats, the Double-A affiliate of the Toronto Blue Jays, and is the current PA commentator for the MLB The Show series.

The San Diego Padres were first portrayed in the 1979 NBC made-for-TV film The Kid from Left Field, starring Gary Coleman as Jackie Robinson "J.R." Cooper, a youngster who is passionate about baseball, and puts his knowledge to good use when he becomes the manager of the Padres and helps lead them to the World Series.

In 2015, the San Diego Padres were also seen in an HBO original comedy/documentary style movie, Ferrell Takes the Field starring Will Ferrell, where he plays ten major league baseball Spring-training games in ten different positions on the field in one day, one of the teams being Padres. The movie was an HBO special sponsored by MLB and dedicated to the charity Cancer for College. The movie premiered in Petco Park after the Padres vs. Dodgers game on September 5, 2015.

In 2016, the San Diego Padres were portrayed once again in the one-season Fox television series Pitch, starring Kylie Bunbury as Ginny Baker, the first female to play in Major League Baseball.

== See also ==
- Sports in San Diego

== Notes ==
Awards and achievements
Preceded by Philadelphia Phillies; 1983	National League champions 1984	Succeeded by St. Louis Cardinals; 1985
Preceded by Florida Marlins; 1997	National League champions 1998	Succeeded by Atlanta Braves; 1999
