= Michel Rosenfeld =

Michel Rosenfeld (born 5 July 1948) is University Professor of Law and Comparative Democracy, the Justice Sydney L. Robins Professor of Human Rights and Director, Program on Global and Comparative Constitutional Theory at the Benjamin N. Cardozo School of Law of Yeshiva University.

Rosenfeld has been at Cardozo since 1988 and teaches courses in Comparative Constitutionalism, Constitutional Law I, Constitutional Law II, Constitutional Interpretation, Constitutionalism and Democracy in an Age of Globalization and Privatization, Liberalism and its Critics and Concepts of Justice. He obtained his Juris Doctor degree from Northwestern University in 1974, and received his B.A. (1969), M.A. (1971), M.Phil. (1978) and Ph.D. in Philosophy (1991) from Columbia University.

Rosenfeld is the author of several books, including Affirmative Action and Justice: A Philosophical and Constitutional Inquiry (Yale U. Press, 1991) (Winner Outstanding Book Award given by the Gustavus Myers Center for the Study of Human Rights in the United States, 1992); Just Interpretations: Law Between Ethics and Politics (U. of California Press, 1998); The Identity of the Constitutional Subject: Selfhood, Citizenship, Culture and Community (Routledge, 2010); Law, Justice, Democracy and the Clash of Cultures: A Pluralist Account (Cambridge U. Press, 2011); and A Pluralist Theory of Constitutional Justice: Assessing Liberal Democracy in Times of Rising Populism and Illiberalism (Oxford U. Press,2022); a co-author of "Démocraties sous stress: Les défis du terrorisme global" (Democracies under stress: the challenges posed by global terrorism) (Presses Universitaires de France (PUF) 2016) (with Antoine Garapon); Comparative Constitutionalism: Cases and Materials (4th Ed., West, 2022) (with Baer, Dorsen, Mancini and Sajo); Politicized Religion and the Reframing of Fundamental Rights (Oxford U. Press: Comparative Constitutionalism Series 2026) (with Susanna Mancini); and a co-editor of Hegel and Legal Theory (Routledge, 1991);Deconstruction and the Possibility of Justice (Routledge, 1992); Habermas on Law and Democracy: Critical Exchanges (U. of California Press, 1998); The Oxford Handbook of Comparative Constitutional Law (Oxford U. Press 2012); Constitutional Secularism in an Age of Religious Revival (Oxford U. Press, 2014); The Conscience Wars: Rethinking the Balance between Religion, Identity, and Equality (Cambridge U. Press, 2018); Administering Interpretation: Derrida, Agamben, and the Political Theology of Law (Fordham University Press: Just Ideas Series, 2019); and Research Handbook on the Law and Politics of Sovereignty(Edward Elgar Publishing Ltd. 2026). Rosenfeld has also published over one hundred other works, including law review articles and chapters in edited volumes. Several among his works have been translated into: Chinese, French, Greek, Hebrew, Hungarian, Italian, Korean, Portuguese, Russian, Turkish and Spanish.

Rosenfeld has been the President of the International Association of Constitutional Law (1999-2004) and Editor-in-Chief of the International Journal of Constitutional Law (2001-2014). He was awarded the French Legion of Honor in 2004, named to a 2007-2008 Blaise Pascal Excellence Research Chair, the Fresco Chair in Jurisprudence at the University of Genoa, Italy (2007), The Chaim Perelman Chair in Legal Philosophy at the Free University in Brussels, Belgium (2011), the Fulbright-Tocqueville Distinguished Chair at the University of Paris I (Pantheon-Sorbonne) (2013), and the Leverhulme Visiting Professorship at the Birkbeck School of Law of the University of London (2014).
