= David Rudenstine =

American legal scholar

David Rudenstine is the Benjamin N. Cardozo School of Law's Sheldon H. Solow Professor of Law. He teaches United States constitutional law.

Rudenstine has been teaching at Cardozo since 1979 and is the author of The Day the Presses Stopped: A History of the Pentagon Papers Case. His latest book, The Age of Deference: The Supreme Court, National Security and The Constitutional Order, was published in 2016.

He served as Dean of the Benjamin N. Cardozo School of Law, 2001–9.
