= Ekow Yankah =

American professor of law

Ekow N. Yankah

Academic background
- Education: University of Michigan; Columbia University; University of Oxford

Academic work
- Institutions: Benjamin N. Cardozo School of Law

Ekow Nyansah Yankah is an American jurist who is the Thomas Cooley Professor of Law at the University of Michigan. His research considers criminal law, election law and police brutality.

== Early life and education ==
Yankah, born to Ghanaian parents, earned his bachelor's degree at the University of Michigan. He obtained his Juris Doctor from Columbia Law School in 2000. Yankah was awarded a Marshall Scholarship to study at the University of Oxford, earning a Bachelor of Civil Law at Lincoln College. He held visiting positions at the Interdisciplinary Center Herzliya and the University of Toronto Faculty of Law. His first faculty position was at the University of Illinois College of Law.

== Research and career ==
His research considers the intersection of law and society. In particular, Yankah focuses on election reform, criminal justice and policing. He believes that the American legal system fails Black communities, with a particular focus on opioid addiction, mass incarceration and police brutality.

Yankah has investigated voting rights and election law. He is co-chair of the New York Democratic Lawyers Council (NYDLC), a coalition of attorneys who look to protect a citizen's right to vote. The NYDLC are involved with election monitoring, pro-voting advocacy and educational empowerment. In 2021, state leaders in New York appointed Yankah chair of the state’s newly established Public Campaign Finance Board.

He is committed to criminal justice reform, and serves on the Board of Directors of the Innocence Project. In 2017 Yankah was awarded the Innocence Project Advocate of Justice award. In particular, he believes that the vague language of the Constitution of the United States leaves too much scope for dangerous interpretation; systematically supporting police brutality. Yankah has studied the legal landscape of accountability for police officers. During the Ferguson unrest Yankah attended a rally at Columbia University. He said, "If I hear one more commentator on public TV say, 'Let's start a conversation about race,' I will lose my mind ... We've been having a conversation for 80 years,". In the aftermath of the murder of George Floyd, Yankah said, “We can no longer have an America where white problems are social problems and black problems are policing problems,”.

In 2019 Yankah taught a course on Black Lives Matter, race and policing at the Georgetown University Law Center.

== Controversial works ==
In 2017, Yankah penned an opinion editorial for the New York Times questioning whether he could allow his children to befriend white people in the era of Donald Trump's presidency. The article was criticized by many political commentators.

== Selected publications ==
- Yankah, E.N (2008). "The Force of Law: The Role of Coercion in Legal Norms". University of Richmond Law Review. 42 (5): 1195–1256. ISSN 0566-2389. OCLC 231769698.
- Yankah, E. N (2004). "Good Guys and Bad Guys: Punishing Character, Equality and the Irrelevance of Moral Character to Criminal Punishment". Cardozo Law Review. 25: 1019–1068. ISSN 0270-5192. OCLC 109541509.
- Yankah E.N (2011). "A paradox in overcriminalization". New Criminal Law Review. 14 (1): 1–34. doi:10.1525/nclr.2011.14.1.1. ISSN 1933-4192. OCLC 714858140.
