= Societe Le Chant du Monde v. Societe Fox Europe and Societe Fox Americaine Twentieth Century =

1953 French court decision on moral rights

Société Le Chant du Monde v. Société Fox Europe and Société Fox Americaine Twentieth Century (Cour d'appel, Paris, 13 January 1953) is a French court case that had the same facts and arguments as the New York case Shostakovich v. Twentieth Century-Fox, wherein four Russian composers: Dmitri Shostakovich, Aram Khachaturian, Sergei Prokofiev and Nikolai Myaskovsky sued Twentieth Century-Fox to prevent the use of their public domain compositions in an anti-Communist film titled The Iron Curtain. The New York court predicted the future consequences of the holding of the French court, that droit moral could "prevent the use of a composition or work, in the public domain." The film was ordered seized.

Russian music for many decades was in the public domain in the United States and western Europe, in response to the Soviet Union not recognizing western copyrights.

Normally, works are put into the public domain years after the authors die, however, depending on the country, authors may dedicate their works to the public domain voluntarily. The Shostakovich and Le Chant du Monde problem is still existent in that voluntarily dedicated works may not truly be freely available for modification or even aggregation (the music in Le Chant du Monde was merely a motion picture soundtrack) until the author is deceased, even though the works are in the public domain.

This case was discussed in Strauss, The Moral Right of the Author, 4 Am. J. Comp. L. 506, 534-35 n.56 (1955).
