= Peter Goodrich =

Professor of law

Peter Goodrich is a Professor of Law at the Benjamin N. Cardozo School of Law, Yeshiva University. He is the managing editor of Law and Literature and serves on the editorial board of Law and Critique. He is co-editor of the critical legal studies book series 'Discourses of Law' published by Routledge. Goodrich was one of the founding academic staff in the Birkbeck Law School.

Goodrich has been at Cardozo Law School since 2000 and teaches courses in Contracts, Jurisprudence, Film and Law, and Gender and Law. He obtained his LL.B. in 1975 from the University of Sheffield and his Ph.D. in 1984 from the University of Edinburgh with the thesis 'Legal discourse: studies in linguistics, rhetoric and legal analysis'. This was also published as a book by Macmillan, London, 1987. His scholarly work is wide-ranging in its engagement with questions of law, interpretation, history, institution, rhetoric, visuality, and aesthetics.

== Published work ==
=== Monographs ===
- Reading the Law: A Critical Introduction to Legal Method and Techniques. Oxford: B. Blackwell (1986). ISBN 9780631146292.
- Legal Discourse: Studies in Linguistics, Rhetoric and Legal Analysis. London: Macmillan (1987). ISBN 9780333515846.
- Languages of Law: From Logics of Memory to Nomadic Masks. London: Weidenfeld and Nicolson (1990). ISBN 9780297820093.
- Oedipus Lex: Psychoanalysis, History, Law. Berkeley: University of California Press (1995). ISBN 9780520089907.
- Law in the Courts of Love: Literature and Other Minor Jurisprudences. London: Routledge (1996). ISBN 0415061652.
- The Laws of Love: A Brief Historical and Practical Manual. Basingstoke: Palgrave Macmillan (2006). ISBN 9781349283118.
- Legal Emblems and the Art of Law: Obiter Depicta as the Vision of Governance. New York: Cambridge University Press (2013). ISBN 9781107035997.
- Imago Decidendi: On the Common Law of Images. Leiden: Brill (2017). ISBN 9789004354333
- Schreber's Law: Jurisprudence and Judgment in Transition. Edinburgh: Edinburgh University Press (2018). ISBN 9781474426565.

=== Selected editorial work ===
- (edited with Costas Douzinas and Yifat Hachamovitch) Politics, Postmodernity and Critical Legal Studies: The Legality of the Contingent, Routledge, 1994, ISBN 978-0-415-08651-6.
- (edited with Mariana Valverde) Nietzsche and Legal Theory: Half-Written Laws, Routledge, 2005, ISBN 978-0415950794.
- (edited with Lior Barshack) Law Text Terror, Routledge-Cavendish, 2006, ISBN 978-1845680619.
  - ^{Note: a paperback edition followed six months later, with Anton Schutz as a third editor. ISBN 978-1904385257}
- (edited with Valérie Hayaert) Genealogies of Legal Vision, Routledge, 2016, ISBN 978-1317683896.
