= José E. Feliciano =

Puerto Rican-born American businessman and investor

- Born: Bayamón, Puerto Rico
- Education: Princeton University (BSE); Stanford University (MBA)
- Occupations: Co-ownership of the San Diego Padres with his wife Kwanza Jones; Co-founder and Managing Partner, Clearlake Capital
- Spouse: Kwanza Jones

José E. Feliciano is a Puerto Rican businessman and investor. He is the co-founder and managing partner of investment firm Clearlake Capital. According to Forbes, Feliciano has a net worth of $3.9 billion as of May 2026. Feliciano was first placed on the Forbes 400 and Forbes billionaires lists in 2020.

== Early life and education ==
Feliciano was born in Bayamón, Puerto Rico. He graduated from Princeton University with a bachelor's degree in mechanical and aerospace engineering in 1994 and received his master's degree in business administration from the Stanford Graduate School of Business.

== Career ==
Feliciano started his career in investment banking in the mergers and acquisitions and corporate finance groups at Goldman Sachs. He served as chief financial officer at govWorks before its bankruptcy and was a partner at Tennenbaum Capital, an alternative investment management firm. In 2006, Feliciano and Behdad Eghbali co-founded Clearlake Capital.

Feliciano's Clearlake Capital is the 12th largest private equity firm in the world, having overseen more than $45 billion in capital. Notable portfolio clientele include Alteryx, Dun & Bradstreet, and ModMed.

In May 2022, a consortium of investors co-led by Clearlake closed its acquisition of Chelsea F.C. for over £4.25 billion. Feliciano serves on the boards of several Clearlake portfolio companies, including Chelsea F.C. and WellPet.

Feliciano's interest in sports has driven some of Clearlake Capital's investments, most notably with the acquisition of Chelsea F.C. Feliciano has described similarities between the disciplines of sports and business, emphasizing the importance of teamwork, strategy, and execution in achieving success in both arenas.

In 2022 and 2023, the Los Angeles Business Journal named Feliciano one of the wealthiest Angelenos.

Feliciano has seen firm assets increase to over $90 billion in 2025, and they are expected to continue to rise as Feliciano and his partners have launched Clearlake Credit to increase private and liquid credit investments.

On April 22, 2026, The Athletic reported that Feliciano and his wife, Kwanza Jones, were close to acquiring approximately 40% of the San Diego Padres. On May 2, the Padres announced a sale to Feliciano and Jones. The sale was approved by Major League Baseball on August 17, and was finalized a few days later. On August 24, a press conference was held at Petco Park, officially introducing Feliciano and Jones as the new owners of the Padres.

In November 2026, Feliciano and Jones were reportedly bidding to acquire the Los Angeles Sparks for $750 million.

== Personal life and philanthropy ==
Feliciano is married to Kwanza Jones, an artist and Princeton alumna, and the couple co-founded Kwanza Jones & José E. Feliciano Supercharged Initiative, a philanthropic grant-making organization.

In 2017, Clearlake Capital and the Kwanza Jones & José E. Feliciano Supercharged Initiative committed to match donations up to $500,000 for Puerto Rico disaster relief following Hurricane Maria. Clearlake Capital and the Kwanza Jones and José E. Feliciano Supercharged Initiative were the anchor sponsors focused on supporting recovery and rebuilding efforts on the island.

In 2019, Feliciano and Jones made a $1 million gift to Bennet College, one of the single largest grants in the HBCU's history. In 2020, Feliciano and Jones announced a $20 million gift to Princeton in support of access and inclusion. From 2017 to 2025, Feliciano and Jones have committed over $200 million in contributions to these groups and others, including the Stanford Graduate School of Business, where Feliciano has been named a trustee.

In July 2021, Feliciano was named one of four winners of the Robert F. Kennedy Human Rights Award.

Feliciano serves on the board of directors of Cedars-Sinai Medical Center, the Robert Toigo Foundation and Robert F. Kennedy Human Rights. He is also a trustee of the J. Paul Getty Trust, Stanford University, and the Smithsonian's National Museum of the American Latino, and is on the board of directors for LA28, the Olympic and Paralympic Games Los Angeles 2028. He is a member of the Latino fraternity Lambda Upsilon Lambda.
