= Kwanza Jones =

American singer-songwriter and baseball team owner

- Born: Los Angeles, California, U.S.
- Education: Princeton University (BA); Yeshiva University (JD)
- Occupations: Investor; singer-songwriter; MLB team owner
- Years active: 2001–present
- Known for: Co-owner of the San Diego Padres
- Spouse: José E. Feliciano
- Website: kwanzajones.com

Kwanza Jones is an American businesswoman, philanthropist, and singer-songwriter. Jones began her career as a singer, performing and winning Amateur Night at the Apollo Theater. In 2026, Jones and her husband José E. Feliciano, led an investor group to purchase the San Diego Padres for a record price of $3.9 billion.

== Early life and education ==
Jones was born in Los Angeles, California, on Thanksgiving Day. In her youth, she played the flute, violin, and piano, as well as sang in choirs at school and church; she also ran track and field at Coolidge Senior High School in Washington, D.C. and in college for the Princeton Tigers. In addition to her arts and athletics, Jones served on the D.C. State Board of Education as an elected Student Member. Her paternal great-grandmother played piano for famous blues singer Bessie Smith.

Jones attended Princeton University in Princeton, New Jersey. Her focus was interdisciplinary as she majored in Public and International Affairs at the Princeton School of Public and International Affairs. While there she was in an a cappella group, a soloist in the gospel choir, and in an electronica band. She had a chance meeting with music legend Quincy Jones which piqued her interest in music as a profession. After graduating from Princeton, Jones was Miss Baltimore. She has a J.D. degree from the Benjamin N. Cardozo School of Law and a Master of Dispute Resolution from the Pepperdine University School of Law.

== Business career ==
=== SuperCharged Companies ===
Jones is the Founder of SUPERCHARGED by Kwanza Jones, a motivational media company.

=== Sports ownership ===
On April 17, 2026, The Wall Street Journal reported that Jones and her husband José E. Feliciano were close to acquiring the San Diego Padres for $3.9 billion, a record high in Major League Baseball history.

In November 2026, Jones and Feliciano were reportedly bidding to acquire the Los Angeles Sparks for $750 million.

=== Board memberships ===
Jones served on the Board of Directors for Susan G. Komen, where she pushed the national nonprofit to diversify both their leadership and programming, the UCLA Ronald Reagan Medical Center Board of Advisors, and as chair of the Board of Trustees of Bennett College. In 2021, she served on the board of the Apollo Theater.

== Music career ==
Jones started her singing career after performing and winning Amateur Night at the Apollo Theater while in college at Princeton University. Her debut album, Naked, was conceived while she was attending Princeton. At this time, she played a lot in bars and other small venues. Her biggest performance during this time was at the Apollo Theater. After graduating, she decided to travel and wrote her second album Naked 2: universal fire. Along with original material, this album also featured two cover songs, the Doors' "Light My Fire" and Ashford & Simpson's "Ain't No Mountain High Enough". When she arrived back in the US, she moved to Los Angeles to continue her music career.

Jones' song "Think Again" earned her first appearance on the Billboard charts. She debut at No. 47 on the Billboard Hot Dance/Club Play Charts. In December 2010, it was No. 3 on the Biggest Jump list. In February 2011, it peaked at No. 21 on the Billboard charts. "Think Again – The Remixes" is a Dance project featuring the single, "Think Again" where Jones collaborated with Grammy-nominated American DJ/producer/remixer, Mike Rizzo. Also working with her on this project was DJ Lynnwood and Jaime J Sanchez. This project was released on November 26, 2010. All of Jones' music has been release on her independent label Innovation Entertainment. Jones' most recent studio album, is Supercharged; she has released numerous singles since then.

== Philanthropy and activism ==
Jones is the co-founder and CEO of the Kwanza Jones & José E. Feliciano Initiative, a grant making and impact investment organization.

In 2022, Jones donated $30,000 to WRRAP, PFLAG, and Girls Inc. following the release of her music video "Queen Moves Only, Mother's Day Mix." These 3 organizations aligned with the mission and message behind the song. She announced a $20 million gift to Princeton University in 2020 to help expand the student body and in support of access and inclusion. The same year, she wrote an Open Love Letter to Princeton University to help remove Woodrow Wilson's name off buildings.

In 2019, Bennett College announced a donation of $1 million from Jones and her husband José E. Feliciano to support the college's capital campaign. The Jones-Feliciano gift is one of the single largest donations in Bennett College's history. Jones' mother, Dorothy Wilkerson Jones, and her aunt, Brenda Wilkerson Hoover, as well as several of her extended family members are Bennett College alumnae. The same year, she released "Problem," leading up the 2020 elections, a music video style public service announcement that addressed injustice, racial profiling, and issues that impact women and other historically marginalized people. In 2017, in response to the humanitarian crisis in Puerto Rico after Hurricane Maria hit the island, she was an anchor sponsor supporting recovery efforts, including resources, relief, and rebuilding. She has also supported the United Way as a member of the Tocqueville Society.

In 2010, Jones joined artists Beyoncé, Sinéad O'Connor, Halle Berry, Mary J. Blige, and others, in support of Girls Educational and Mentoring Services' (GEMS) campaign, "Girls Are Not for Sale." This was a national campaign committed to ending the commercial sexual exploitation and trafficking of girls and young women.

== Charts and awards ==
Year	Title	Chart	Weeks on chart	Peak position
2017	Summer Forever	Billboard Hot Dance Club Songs	10	20
2016	Shatterproof	Billboard Hot Dance Club Songs	9	20
2015	Turn It Up	Billboard Hot Dance Club Songs	12	8
2015	Turn It Up	Billboard Dance/Electronic Songs	5	37
2014	Vicious	Billboard Hot Dance Club Songs	8	38
2013	Supercharged	DJ Times National Dance/Crossover	8	2
2013	Supercharged	Billboard Hot Dance Club Songs	11	19
2013	Supercharged	Billboard Dance/Electronic Songs	3	41
2012	Time To Go	Billboard Hot Dance Club Songs	7	34
2011	Think Again	Billboard Hot Dance Club Songs	11	21

== Discography ==
Release date	Title	Release type
2022	Enough	Single
2022	Rise	Single
2022	More Now Than Ever	Single
2022	Queens Moves Only - Mother's Day Mix	Single
2019	Problem	Single
2017	Summer Forever	EP
2017	Blah Zey Blah	Single
2017	Shatterproof	Single
2016	Move Like It's Christmas	Single
2015	Turn It Up – Remixes	Album
2014	Vicious – The Remixes	EP
2013	Supercharged – The Remixes	Album
2013	Supercharged – Deluxe Edition	Album
2013	Supercharged	Album
2012	Time To Go – The Complete Remixes	Album
2012	Time To Go – The Remixes	Album
2011	Time To Go	Single
2011	Think Again – The Remixes, Pt. 2	EP
2010	Think Again – The Remixes, Pt. 1	Album
2010	Not a Breakup Song	Single
2009	Everything Around You	Single
2006	Naked 2: universal fire	Album
2005	Victim of the System	EP
2001	Naked	Album

== Tours ==
- Gladiators "Я” Vicious Tour (2013)
- Bring The Heat Tour (2012)
- Girls 4 Boys Tour (2011)
