= Edward Zelinsky =

Academic background
- Education: Yale University (BA, MA, JD, MPhil)

Academic work
- Discipline: Law
- Sub-discipline: Tax law Tax policy
- Institutions: Yeshiva University

Edward Zelinsky is an American legal scholar and specialist in tax law working as a professor at Benjamin N. Cardozo School of Law in New York City. He has also been a visiting professor at the Yale Law School and has taught at Cornell University, New York University, and Columbia University.

== Education ==
Zelinsky is a native of Rock Island, Illinois, but his father, Dr. Morris Zukerman died when he was only five. Three years later, his mother, the former Lucille Brotman, married Harold Zelinsky of Omaha. where Edward grew up. In 1967, he was elected Grand Aleph Godol of A.Z.A, the boys youth branch of B'nai Brith. A 1968 graduate of Omaha's Central High school, he then attended Yale, and Yale Law School. His son, Aaron Zelinsky, worked as an assistant United States attorney in Maryland. He earned a Bachelor of Arts, Master of Arts, Juris Doctor, and Master of Philosophy from Yale University.

== Career ==
Zelinsky has testified before the United States Congress and United States House Committee on the Judiciary. He has served on the New Haven Board of Aldermen, and when elected was the first person to be elected to the board while a student at Yale University.

In 2003, he challenged the State of New York on its so-called "convenience of the employer" doctrine which enabled New York to engage in what Zelinsky and others have alleged is unconstitutional double taxation of remote workers. The case, Zelinsky v. Tax Appeals Tribunal, was denied certiorari by the U.S. Supreme Court after the New York Court of Appeals decided against Zelinsky. Connecticut Senator Chris Dodd subsequently attempted to introduce federal legislation that would prevent New York and other states from engaging in such taxation.

Zelinsky and Justice Samuel Alito attended Yale Law School together. In November 2005, during Alito's confirmation process for a seat on the Supreme Court of the United States, Zelinsky supported Alito in the press, identifying himself as "a Democrat for Sam".

Zelinsky was critical of the Obama administration's foreign policy toward Iran. He also believes the Logan Act is an anachronism in view of modern communications, and should be repealed.

== Publications ==
His 2007 book The Origins of the Ownership Society (OUP) examines the political and social implications of a defined contribution paradigm.
