= Bobby Cressey =

American musician and composer

Bobby Cressey (born 1981) is an American musician and composer who is the stadium organist for the San Diego Padres of Major League Baseball (MLB). Cressey also plays organ for the San Diego Gulls and the San Diego Sockers. He has been playing organ at Petco Park for over ten years as of 2020. When he plays daytime games for the Padres, his organ is in section 313 and he takes requests in person and over social media.

Cressey got the job in 2010 when he was at a special preview night for the Padres and the owners were discussing having "throwback" Thursday games with live organ music. They disclosed they had no organ player in mind and Cressey introduced himself and persisted in suggesting himself until he got an audition and got the gig. He began by playing just Thursday games, but now plays day games and Sunday games.

Cressey plays keyboards in the San Diego–based band The Mighty Untouchables. He has recorded one solo album in 2017, Cali Native, with 20 local musicians. He has played music for video games including MLB 14 The Show, writing both original songs and other audio cues for the game.

== Personal life ==
Cressey was born in Carlsbad, California, in 1981. He graduated from the University of California, San Diego with a degree in structural engineering. He learned to play piano on his mother's Baldwin Acrosonic. He and his wife wed in 2011, and are now the parents to two children - one daughter and one son.
