= Alexander A. Reinert =

American legal scholar

- Spouse: Betsy Ginsberg

Academic background
- Education: Brown University (BA); New York University (JD)

Academic work
- Discipline: Law
- Sub-discipline: Constitutional law Civil procedure Criminal law
- Institutions: Benjamin N. Cardozo School of Law

Alexander A. Reinert is an American legal scholar working as a professor of law at the Benjamin N. Cardozo School of Law. Reinert specializes in the areas of civil procedure, civil rights law, rights of prisoners and detainees, and constitutional law.

== Education ==
Reinert received his bachelor's degree from Brown University in 1994 and a Juris Doctor from the New York University School of Law in 1999.

== Career ==
Following law school, Reinert clerked for Harry T. Edwards, of the United States Court of Appeals for the District of Columbia Circuit, followed by Supreme Court Justice Stephen Breyer.

Reinert conducts research in the areas of constitutional law, civil procedure, and criminal law. His articles have appeared in the Stanford Law Review, the University of Illinois Law Review, the Virginia Law Review, and the University of Pennsylvania Law Review, among other journals.

=== Ashcroft v. Iqbal ===
Reinert is also well known for having litigated and argued the United States Supreme Court case Ashcroft v. Iqbal. The Supreme Court ultimately decided that Iqbal had not stated, with sufficient specificity, a claim against Attorney General John Ashcroft and other high ranking governmental officials, sending Reinert and his client back to rewrite the complaint.

== Personal life ==
He is married to fellow Cardozo professor Betsy Ginsberg.

== See also ==
- List of law clerks for the second seat of the Supreme Court of the United States
