= Nominal party =

Legal party

In a civil lawsuit, a nominal party is one named as a party on the record of an action, but having no interest in the action.
