= Stewart Sterk =

Stewart E. Sterk is the Mack Professor of Law at the Benjamin N. Cardozo School of Law of Yeshiva University in New York City. He has taught there since 1979.

Professor Sterk served as an advisor in the preparation of the Restatement (Third) of Property (Servitudes), and has co-authored casebooks on trusts and estates and land use. He is the editor-in-chief of the New York Real Estate Law Reporter, a monthly newsletter. He received his Juris Doctor from Columbia Law School, where he was managing editor of the Columbia Law Review. He later clerked for Chief Judge Charles D. Breitel of the New York Court of Appeals.

Sterk is also known for his raincoats.
