= Justin Hughes (law professor) =

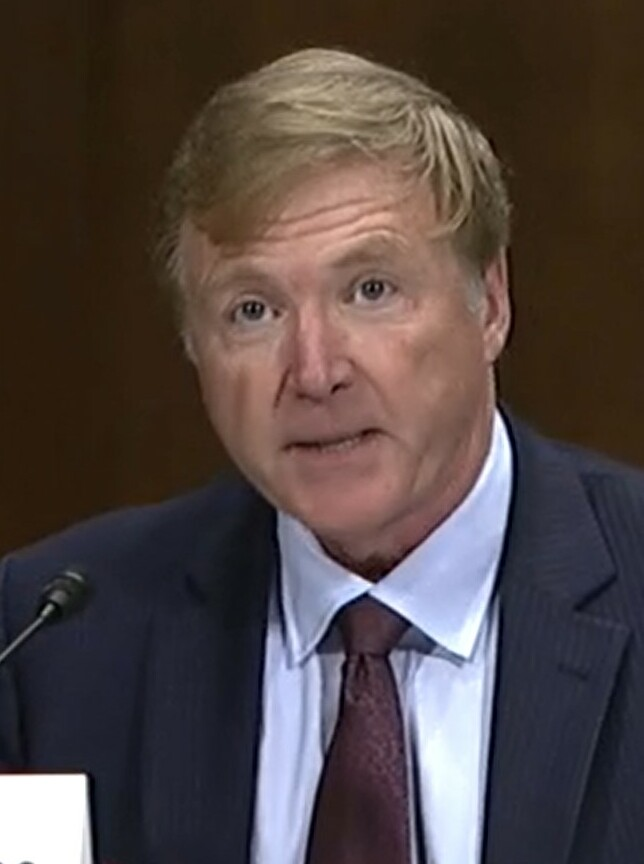
- Hughes in 2020
- Education: Harvard Law School

Justin Hughes is an American legal scholar and the William H. Hannon Professor of Law at Loyola Law School, Los Angeles. He teaches courses in intellectual property law, international trade, and internet law. His scholarship emphasizes philosophical and historical issues in intellectual property, focusing on copyright, trademarks, and geographical indications. He has also led United States delegations to international negotiations on copyright.

== Biography ==
After obtaining his Juris Doctor degree from Harvard University in 1986, Hughes was a Luce Scholar and clerked for the Lord President of the Supreme Court of Malaysia from 1988 to 1989. He then worked on policy at the U.S. Patent and Trademark Office (USPTO) from 1997 to 2001 and taught at the Benjamin N. Cardozo School of Law from 2002 to 2013.

In 2009, the Obama administration appointed him as a part-time adviser, in which position he began heading US delegations to meetings of the World Intellectual Property Organization (WIPO). At a December 2009 meeting of the WIPO, he announced a significant shift in US policy in international copyright law that resulted in Brazil, Mexico, the US, and the European Union leading efforts to establish exceptions in international copyright law for the blind. Along with delegates from India and Mexico, he also successfully revived efforts to finalize the long-dormant WIPO Audiovisual Performers Treaty. Hughes led the US delegations that completed both that treaty, now frequently called the Beijing Treaty on Audiovisual Performances (2012), and the Marrakesh Treaty for the Blind (2013). He is widely credited with playing an instrumental role in the negotiation of both multilateral treaties.
