= Case theory (in law) =

Explanation of events being considered in a legal case

In law, a case theory (aka theory of case, theory of a case, or theory of the case) is “a detailed, coherent, accurate story of what occurred" involving both a legal theory (i.e., claims/causes of action or affirmative defenses) and a factual theory (i.e., an explanation of how a particular course of events could have happened).

That is, a case theory is a logical description of events that the attorney wants the judge or jury to adopt as their own perception of the underlying situation. The theory is often expressed in a story that should be compellingly probable. Case theory is distinguished from jurisprudence (aka legal theory) as general theory of law not specific to a case.

== Examples of usage ==
- “Judge Taylor asked lawyers for … their theories of the case because of his unfamiliarity with it …. [The Judge] agreed to …seal the defense summary of its case theory.”
- “Working with attorneys, Capital Case Investigators will be responsible for … consulting with attorneys to develop case theories and strategies …"
