= Benjamin N. Cardozo School of Law =

Law school of Yeshiva University in New York

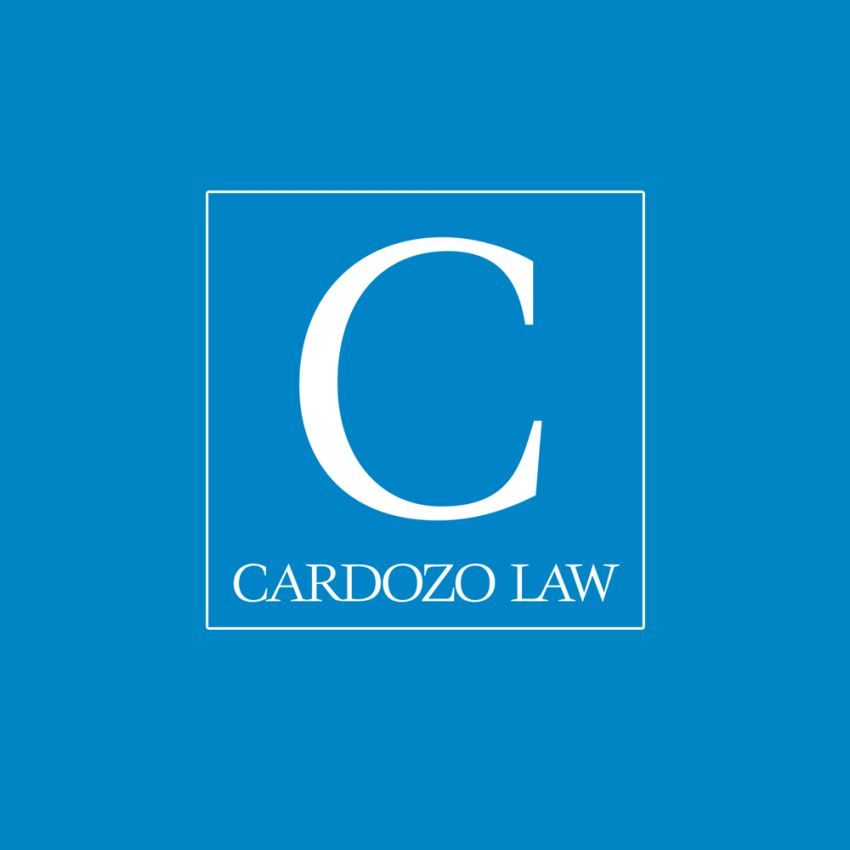
- Parent school: Yeshiva University
- Established: 1976; 50 years ago
- School type: Private law school
- Dean: Melanie Leslie
- Location: Manhattan, New York City, U.S. 40°44′05″N 73°59′40″W
- Enrollment: 996 (JD, LLM & JSD)
- Faculty: 191
- USNWR ranking: 59th (2026)
- Bar pass rate: 94%
- Website: cardozo.yu.edu
- ABA profile
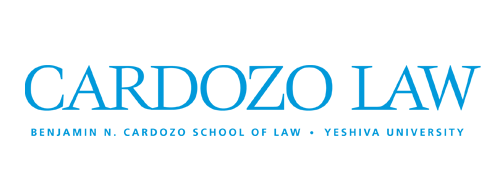

The Benjamin N. Cardozo School of Law is the law school of Yeshiva University in New York City. Founded in 1976 and located on Fifth Avenue near Union Square in Lower Manhattan, the school is named for Supreme Court justice Benjamin N. Cardozo. An LL.M. program was established in 1998. Cardozo is nondenominational and has a secular curriculum, in contrast to some of Yeshiva University's undergraduate programs. Around 320 students begin the J.D. program per year, of whom about 57% are women. In addition, there are about 60–70 LL.M. students each year.

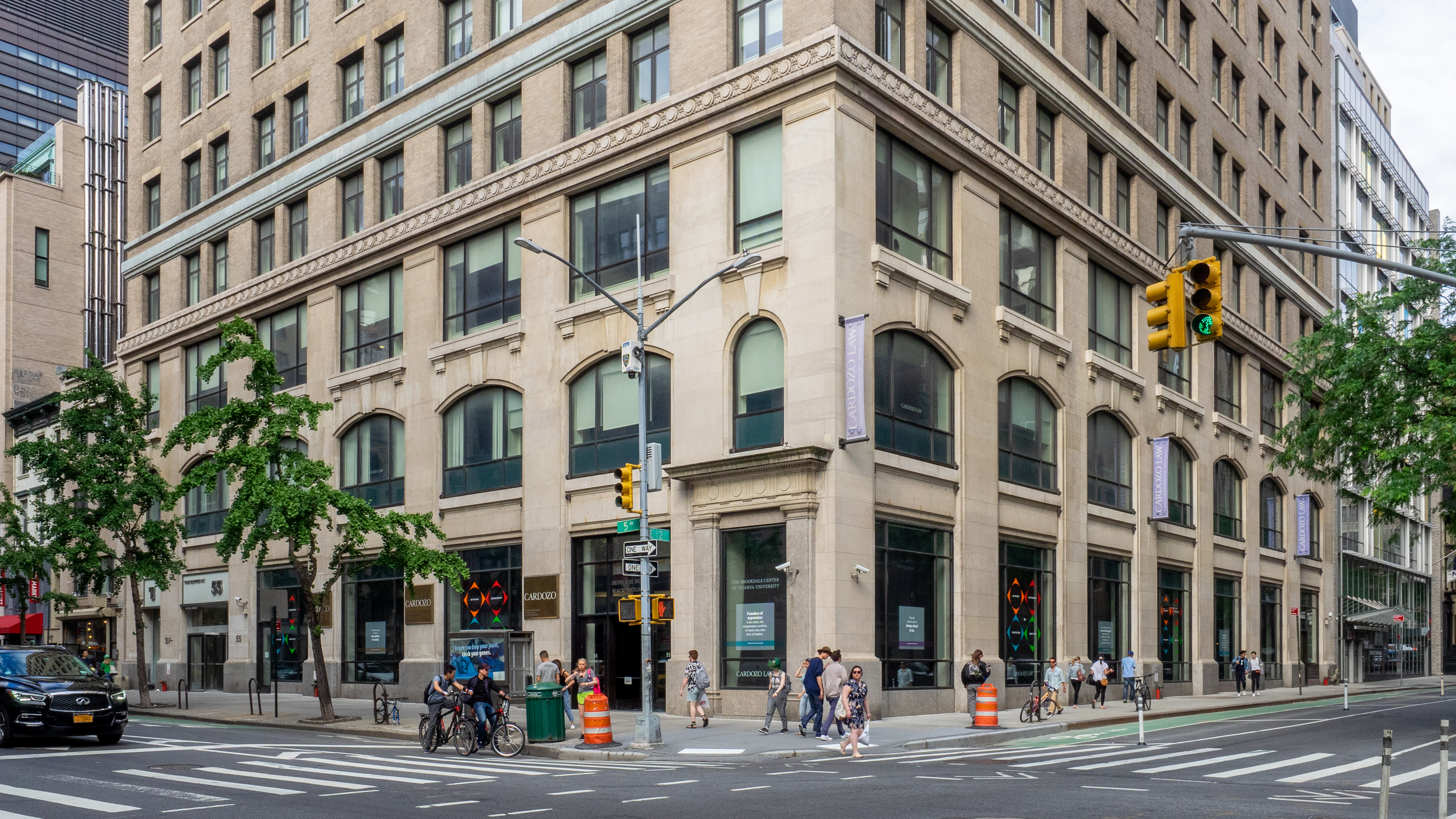
Cardozo School of Law campus on Fifth Avenue in Lower Manhattan

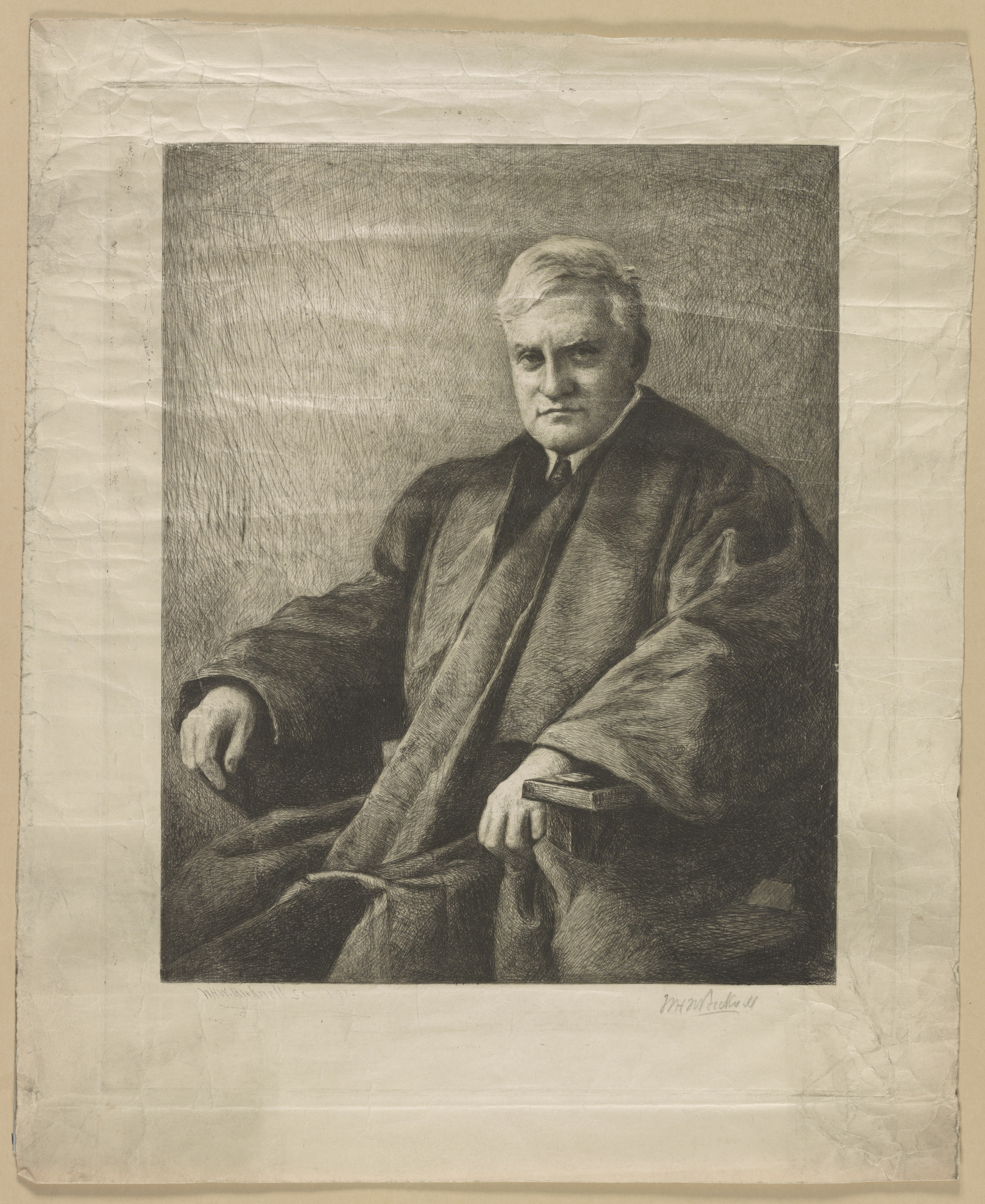
Benjamin N. Cardozo, Supreme Court justice and eponym of the School of Law

== Academics ==
=== Admissions ===
For the class entering in 2022, Cardozo accepted 33.80% of applicants, with 27.12% of those accepted enrolling, the average enrollee having a 164 LSAT score and 3.76 undergraduate GPA.

=== Centers ===
Cardozo is home to academic centers including the FAME Center for fashion, arts, media & entertainment; the Florsheimer Center for Constitutional Democracy; the Data Law Initiative; Center for Visual Advocacy; the Cardozo Law Institute in Holocaust and Human Rights; and the Heyman Center on Corporate Governance.

=== Faculty ===
Cardozo's faculty are notably productive in their scholarship. They were ranked 15th most prolific faculty in 1996, when the School of Law was only twenty years old. Ten years later the faculty had the 31st most SSRN downloads, and it is ranked 33rd in scholarly impact (as of 2021). Highly cited faculty members include Professors Myriam Gilles, Michael Herz, Peter Markowitz, Alexander Reinert, Anthony Sebok, Stewart Sterk and Edward Zelinsky. Cardozo's faculty were also the most productive per capita for articles in top journals from 1993 to 2012, for law schools outside of U.S. News & World Report Top 50 law schools.

=== Clinical teaching ===
Cardozo is noted for its focus on clinical teaching and practical experience. As part of the fulfillment of the J.D. requirements, students may choose to participate in clinics housed within the school, taking on legal work under faculty supervision. The clinics provide pro bono services to clients across a range of areas of legal practice, including both civil and criminal cases. Many clinics serve individual clients, while other clinics take on class action lawsuits. They include the Civil Rights Clinic; Bet Tzedek (focused on representing elderly and disabled people); Filmmakers Legal Clinic; Immigration Justice Clinic; the Perlmutter Center for Legal Justice; Human Rights and Atrocity Prevention Clinic; and Patent Diversity Project Clinic, among others.

=== Rankings and achievements ===
Cardozo has seven faculty members who have clerked for U.S. Supreme Court justices, and Cardozo has had two graduates chosen to clerk for the U.S. Supreme Court: Sara J. Klein ’05 (for Justice John Paul Stevens) and Cliff Elgarten ’79 (for Justice William J. Brennan, Jr.). In 1999 Cardozo became a member of the Order of the Coif, an honor society for law scholars.

Cardozo was the second U.S. law school to secure an invitation to The European Law Moot Court Competition, and the first American law school to be invited twice consecutively. Many of Cardozo's 12,000 alumni reside in the New York metropolitan area, while many pursue their careers internationally and can be found across the country.

U.S. News ranked Cardozo 63 out of 196 law schools in the country in 2025 (5th of 15 law schools in New York State). Cardozo's LL.M./Master of Laws program was ranked tenth by American Universities Admission Program in 2012. Cardozo ranked high in US News law specialties in Dispute Resolution (4th) and Intellectual Property Law (8th) as of the 2023 rankings. It has also been ranked in the top ten for its Music Law program. Cardozo got A-grades in several areas according to National Jurist's preLaw Magazine in 2018, including Tax Law, International Law, Alternative Dispute Resolution, and Business Law. PreLaw Magazine also ranked Cardozo highly in Government and Public Defender/Prosecutor specializations (11th).

Bar examination passage rates

In 2022, 83.5% of the law school's first-time test takers passed the bar exam. Among the 349 who graduated in 2020, 95.6% of those who sat for the bar (336) passed within two years. Of the 261 graduates who took the New York bar exam for the first time in 2022, 84.7% passed (as compared to the state pass rate of 82.7%).

=== Academic program ===
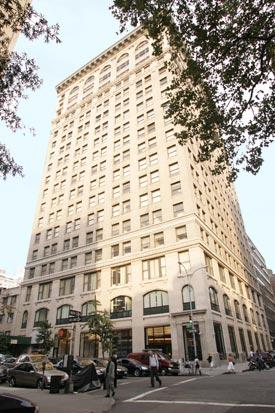
Brookdale Center

The Alabama - Cardozo's nine story residence building

Juris Doctor

For J.D. students, Cardozo offers a selection of over 226 courses in addition to the eight courses required during the first year. Students may choose to graduate with a concentration in one, or several, of the following areas:

- Business Law
- Civil Litigation
- Corporate Compliance and Risk Control
- Criminal Justice
- Data Law
- Dispute Resolution
- Family and Children's Law
- Intellectual Property and Information Law
- International and Comparative Law
- Public Law, Regulation and Government Affairs
- Real Estate
- Rights and the State
- Tax Law

Clinical Education

Cardozo students may earn credits towards the J.D. through clinical education, mainly in-house pro bono work focused on public service and including civil litigation, criminal defense, divorce mediation, and a variety of other legal areas.

- Alexander Fellows Program
- Ferencz Human Rights and Atrocity Prevention Clinic
- Bet Tzedek Civil Litigation Clinic
- Civil Rights Clinic
- Criminal Defense Clinic
- Divorce Mediation Clinic
- Filmmakers Legal Clinic
- Greenberg Immigration Justice Clinic
- Mediation Clinic
- Prosecutor Practicum
- Securities Arbitration Clinic
- Patent Diversity Project Clinic

Study abroad

Cardozo students may study abroad through the following programs:

- Amsterdam Law School: Amsterdam, the Netherlands
- Bucerius Law School: Hamburg, Germany
- Central European University: Budapest, Hungary
- Chinese University of Hong Kong: Hong Kong
- ESADE (Barcelona, Spain)
- HEAD - L'ecode des Hautes Etudes Appliquees du Droit: Paris, France
- Peking University Law School
- Sorbonne Law School: Paris, France
- Tel Aviv University: Tel Aviv, Israel
- University of Deusto: Bilbao, Spain
- University of Oxford Programme in Comparative Media Law and Policy: Oxford, England
- University of Paris X-Nanterre: Paris, France
- University of Roma Tre: Rome, Italy
- University of Sydney: Sydney, Australia
- Independent Study Abroad

May Entry

While most Cardozo students begin their legal studies in August, some students begin in May. May-entry students take their first-year courses over three semesters - summer, fall, and spring, and then attend their fall and spring first-year classes with fall-entry students.

Master of Laws

For those who already have a J.D. degree, Cardozo offers LL.M. degrees in General Studies, Comparative Legal Thought, Dispute Resolution and Advocacy, and Intellectual Property. LL.M. students can take almost any of the courses offered to J.D. students. The LL.M. program may be entered in the Spring Term or in the Fall Term.

== Post-graduation employment and costs ==
According to Cardozo's ABA-required disclosures, 81% of the Class of 2021 obtained full-time, long-term, bar passage-required employment within ten months of graduating. Of the Class of 2018, 87% obtained full-time, long-term, JD-required or JD-advantage employment within ten months. The law school ranks 25th in the United States for "Gold Standard" jobs (full-time, long-term jobs requiring bar passage that are not funded by the school). It is 37th in the percentage of graduates hired by the 100 largest firms.

The cost of tuition and fees at Cardozo for the 2021–22 academic year was $68,462. The Law School Transparency estimated non-discounted, debt-financed cost of attendance (including living expenses) for three years is $323,858.

== Location and facilities ==
Map of Facilities

Located on lower Fifth Avenue at the corner of 12th Street in New York City's Greenwich Village, Cardozo's urban campus is in a 19-story building, known as the Brookdale Center. A multimillion-dollar capital improvement plan took place in 2006. The addition of more space at the Brookdale Center also allowed for a larger and significantly enhanced library, new offices and clinic spaces, as well as a new and larger lobby, moot court room, and ground-floor seminar room. In addition, older classrooms were renovated. In fall 2006, the Greenberg Center for Student Life, given in honor of former Dean David Rudenstine, opened. This addition to Cardozo included a new student lounge and a café on the third floor. Also completed were several new seminar rooms, internal stairways between floors, and added windows.

The Dr. Lillian and Dr. Rebecca Chutick Law Library is the center of student and faculty research at Cardozo. Encompassing four floors of Cardozo's building, the library holds more than 535,000 volumes, over 140 computers, and study space for about 500 students.

Brookdale Center – 55 Fifth Avenue

Cardozo's main campus.

The Cooper Union Library – 7 East 7th Street

The Cooper Union library serve as Cardozo's secondary libraries when the main library is closed on the Sabbath or on holidays.

== Student activities ==
=== Law journals ===
Students in the JD program publish several law journals: Cardozo Law Review; Cardozo Arts & Entertainment Law Journal; Cardozo International and Comparative Law Review; Cardozo Journal of Conflict Resolution; and Cardozo Journal of Equal Rights and Social Justice.

Cardozo Law Review was established in 1979, the first year of the School of Law's existence. The journal was cited 75 times in court cases in 2017–2021, making it fourth most-cited among American law journals (after Harvard Law Review, California Law Review, and Yale Law Review). By journal citations, it ranks 29th, according to Washington & Lee Law School's database. Cardozo Arts & Entertainment Law Journal was ranked first in journal cites in the Entertainment, Arts and Sports Law category in 2006 (second in Scholarly Impact and third in Cites by Courts).

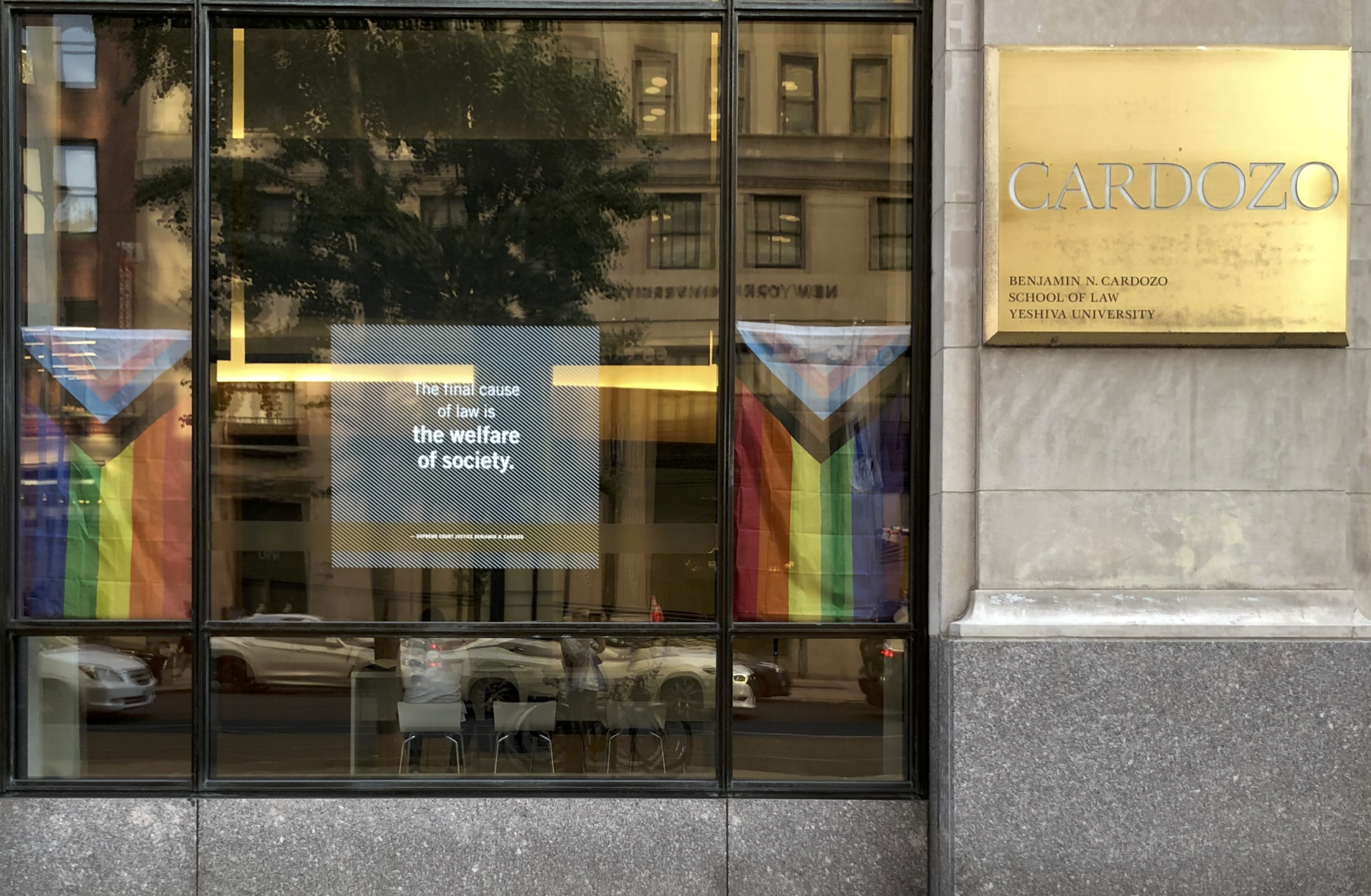
LGBTQ flag at Cardozo School of Law (2022)

=== Moot courts ===
Cardozo offers students the opportunity to participate in the Moot Court Honor Society, a competition-based organization at the school. In addition to participating in approximately six competitions each semester, the organization also hosts the Paulsen Intramural Moot Court Competition, the Monroe Price Media Law Competition, the Cardozo/BMI Moot Court Competition, and the Langfan Oratorical Competition.

=== LGBTQ+ student group ===
Although Cardozo is under the umbrella of Yeshiva University, which has been involved in legal proceedings after refusing to recognize an undergraduate Pride Alliance group for LGBTQ+ students and allies, Cardozo has long had an active, officially recognized LGBTQ student groups; the Gay and Lesbian Alliance was active on campus by the early 1990s, and presently has a student group, OUTLaw, which has put out statements opposing YU's discrimination against its LGBTQ undergraduates.

Faculty and students at both Cardozo and YU's Ferkauf Graduate School of Psychology have voiced their disapproval of the university's discrimination and lawsuit. In a letter signed by over 50 members of the Cardozo faculty (which has 56 full-time members), and in statements made by the Dean of the Law School and the Cardozo Board of Overseers, the Law School has publicly affirmed support for LGBTQIA+ rights and called on YU's administration to desist from its appeal and end its discrimination policy.

== Notable people ==
=== Deans of the Law School ===
- Monrad G. Paulsen (1976–1982)
- Lester Brickman (1980–1982, Acting Dean)
- Monroe E. Price (1982–1991)
- Frank J. Macchiarola (1991–1996)
- Paul R. Verkuil (1997–2001)
- David Rudenstine (2001–2009)
- Matthew Diller (c. 2009–2015)
- Melanie Leslie (2015–present)

=== Alumni ===
- Amanda Berman, civil rights attorney; founder and executive director of Zioness
- Geoffrey Bowers (1954–87), plaintiff in one of the first AIDS discrimination cases to go to public hearing
- Taylor Brown, New York assistant attorney general, Director of the New York City Office of LGBTQIA+ Affairs
- Madeleine Cosman, medieval expert and conservative policy commentator
- Lawrence A. Cunningham, Professor of Law at George Washington University
- John Dalli, partner at Dalli & Marino, LLP
- Aviva Drescher, television personality.
- Ed Fagan, disbarred reparations lawyer
- Sandra J. Feuerstein, District Court Judge, Eastern District of New York
- Sonia Gardner, hedge fund manager and co-founder of Avenue Capital Group
- John S. Hall, poet, musician and entertainment lawyer
- Eric Herschmann, served as a senior advisor to former President Donald Trump.
- Rachel Hirschfeld, animal rights activist and lawyer
- Eddie Huang, Taiwanese American restaurateur, actor, and clothing designer
- Kwanza Jones, artist, investor, entrepreneur and philanthropist.
- Anna Kaplan, New York State Senator for the 7th State Senate district
- Jeff Marx, composer and Tony Award-winning musical lyricist
- Scott McCoy, former member of the Utah State Senate
- Grace Meng, U.S. Congresswoman for New York's 6th Congressional District
- Barbara Olson, lawyer, conservative television commentator (killed in 9/11)
- David Samson, president of the Miami Marlins
- Josh Saviano, actor who played Paul Pfeiffer in The Wonder Years.
- Pam Sherman, columnist also known as "The Suburban Outlaw"
- Marc H. Simon, filmmaker and entertainment attorney
- Laura Sydell, NPR journalist on digital culture
- Randi Weingarten, President of the American Federation of Teachers
- Aaron L. Weisman, United States Attorney for the District of Rhode Island
- Ivan Wilzig, techno musician also known as "Sir Ivan"
- Jeffrey Miller, civil litigator; 2025 Kings County Democratic Party Man of the Year for Community Leadership

=== Notable faculty ===
==== Current faculty ====
- J. David Bleich
- Peter Goodrich
- Alexander A. Reinert
- Michel Rosenfeld
- David Rudenstine
- Barry Scheck
- Stewart Sterk
- Richard H. Weisberg
- Edward Zelinsky

==== Former faculty ====
- Susan Crawford – Harvard Law School
- John F. Duffy – UVA Law School
- Marci Hamilton
- Justin Hughes
- John McGinnis – Northwestern University School of Law
- Paul Alan Levy, 1983–1984
- William F. Patry
- Scott J. Shapiro – Yale Law School
- Kate Shaw
- Telford Taylor
- Ekow Yankah – University of Michigan School of Law
- Margaret Lemos – Duke University School of Law

== See also ==
- Legal education in the United States
- Law schools in the United States
- Law of New York
- Juris doctor
