= List of San Diego Padres owners and executives =

The San Diego Padres are an American professional baseball team based in San Diego. The Padres compete in Major League Baseball (MLB) as a member club of the National League (NL) West Division. This list consists of the owners, general managers (GMs) and other executives of the Padres. The GM controls player transactions, hires the manager and coaching staff, and negotiates with players and agents regarding contracts.

== Owners ==
The Padres have had nine primary owners in team history.

Name	Years
C. Arnholt Smith	1969–1974
Ray Kroc	1974–1984
Joan Kroc	1984–1990
Tom Werner	1990–1994
John Moores	1994–2012
Ron Fowler	2012–2020
Peter Seidler	2020–2023
John Seidler	2025–2026
José E. Feliciano & Kwanza Jones	2026–present

== General Managers ==
Name	Years
Eddie Leishman	1969–1972
Peter Bavasi	1972–1976
Bob Fontaine	1977–1980
Jack McKeon	1980–1990
Joe McIlvaine	1991–1993
Randy Smith	1993–1995
Kevin Towers	1996–2009
Jed Hoyer	2009–2011
Josh Byrnes	2012–2014
A. J. Preller	2014–present

== Other executives ==
- Sandy Alderson
- Buzzie Bavasi
- Mike Dee
- Paul DePodesta
- Larry Doughty
- Theo Epstein
- Chub Feeney
- Billy Herman
- Sandy Johnson
- Larry Lucchino
- Jeff Moorad
- James Mulvaney
- Jim Skaalen
- Ballard Smith, president
- Reggie Waller
