= John Seidler =

American businessman and baseball executive

- Born: c. 1959; Pasadena, California, U.S.
- Education: Santa Clara University (BSc); Loyola Marymount University (JD, MBA)
- Occupations: Former Chairman and principal owner of the San Diego Padres}}
- Spouse: Laurie Seidler
- Children: 3
- Parents: Roland Seidler (father); Terry O'Malley (mother)
- Relatives: Walter O'Malley (grandfather); Peter O'Malley (uncle); Peter Seidler (brother)

John Seidler (born c. 1959) is an American businessman and the former chairman of the San Diego Padres of Major League Baseball, succeeding his younger brother Peter Seidler a few months after the latter's death in November 2023. He is also the chairman and chief executive officer of O'Malley Seidler Partners, LLC, and the co-founder, Chairman and CEO of an engineering consultancy firm.

== Early life and education ==
Seidler was born in 1959, the eldest of ten children born to Roland Seidler and Terry O'Malley Seidler. He is the eldest grandson of Los Angeles Dodgers Hall of Fame owner Walter O'Malley.

Seidler graduated with a Bachelor of Science in engineering from Santa Clara University and both a Juris Doctor and Master of Business Administration from Loyola Marymount University.

== Career ==
After graduation, Seidler was primarily involved in engineering. He was the co-founder, Chairman and CEO of a firm that provided development, engineering, construction and project management services for electric power generation projects.

Seidler currently serves as a board member of Rawlings Sporting Goods, which manufactures baseball and other sports equipment.

=== San Diego Padres ===
In 2012, Seidler became a minority owner of the Padres after his brother Peter and Ron Fowler bought the team. After his brother's death, John was unanimously voted the control person of the team by the remaining MLB owners, and chairman until August 21, 2026, when José E Feliciano became chairman and control person.

== Personal life ==
Seidler is married; he and his wife Laurie have three children, and a grandchild. They currently live in San Diego where the couple purchased a home after their youngest child went to college.

He is reportedly an avid diver and an amateur photographer.

Business positions
Preceded by Peter Seidler	Chairman of the San Diego Padres; 2025–present	Succeeded by Incumbent
