= Peter Seidler =

American businessman (1960–2023)

- Born: November 7, 1960; Alhambra, California, U.S.
- Died: November 14, 2023 (aged 63); San Diego, California, U.S.
- Education: University of Virginia (BS); University of California, Los Angeles (MBA)
- Occupations: Founder and managing partner of Seidler Equity Partners; Chairman and owner of the San Diego Padres
- Spouse: Sheel Seidler
- Children: 3
- Parents: Roland Seidler (father); Terry O'Malley (mother)
- Relatives: Walter O'Malley (grandfather); Peter O'Malley (uncle); John Seidler (brother)

Peter Seidler (November 7, 1960 – November 14, 2023) was an American businessman. He was the chairman of the San Diego Padres of Major League Baseball (MLB) until his death in 2023.

== Early life ==
Seidler was born in Alhambra, California, on November 7, 1960, to Roland Seidler Jr. and Terry O'Malley Seidler. He was the grandson of Walter O'Malley, who had owned the Brooklyn Dodgers of Major League Baseball (MLB) and relocated them to the West Coast to become the Los Angeles Dodgers, and nephew of Peter O'Malley who inherited the team, along with Seidler's mother.

Seidler earned a bachelor's degree in finance from the University of Virginia and a Master of Business Administration from the University of California, Los Angeles. While at Virginia, he joined the Delta Upsilon fraternity.

== Career ==
In 1992, Seidler founded Seidler Equity Partners, a private equity firm, in Marina del Rey, California, which he served as managing partner. Among the companies in which the partnership has invested is LA Fitness and music publishing company Hal Leonard, acquiring a majority ownership in June 2016. In 2018, the firm partnered with MLB to purchase Rawlings for $395 million. The firm had an estimated $1.8 billion in assets under management in 2020 and $3.5 billion in 2023.

=== San Diego Padres ===
In 2012, Seidler, his uncle Peter O'Malley, and Ron Fowler formed the O'Malley Group, which purchased MLB's San Diego Padres from John Moores for $800 million. The team increased spending in an attempt to contend for a championship, acquiring Matt Kemp, Justin Upton, and James Shields. On November 18, 2020, MLB approved the transfer of the role of chairman from Fowler to Seidler, who purchased part of Fowler's stake in the team to become the largest stakeholder.

Seidler increased the Padres' payroll to $214 million for the 2022 season, which was the sixth-highest in MLB. The Padres reached the 2022 National League (NL) Championship Series. Payroll was increased to $237 million for the 2023 MLB season, the third-highest in MLB. He authorized the acquisitions and contract extensions to star players, including Xander Bogaerts, Yu Darvish, Manny Machado, Fernando Tatís Jr., Juan Soto, Josh Hader, and Joe Musgrove. The team went 82–80 and finished third in the NL West.

== Personal life and death ==
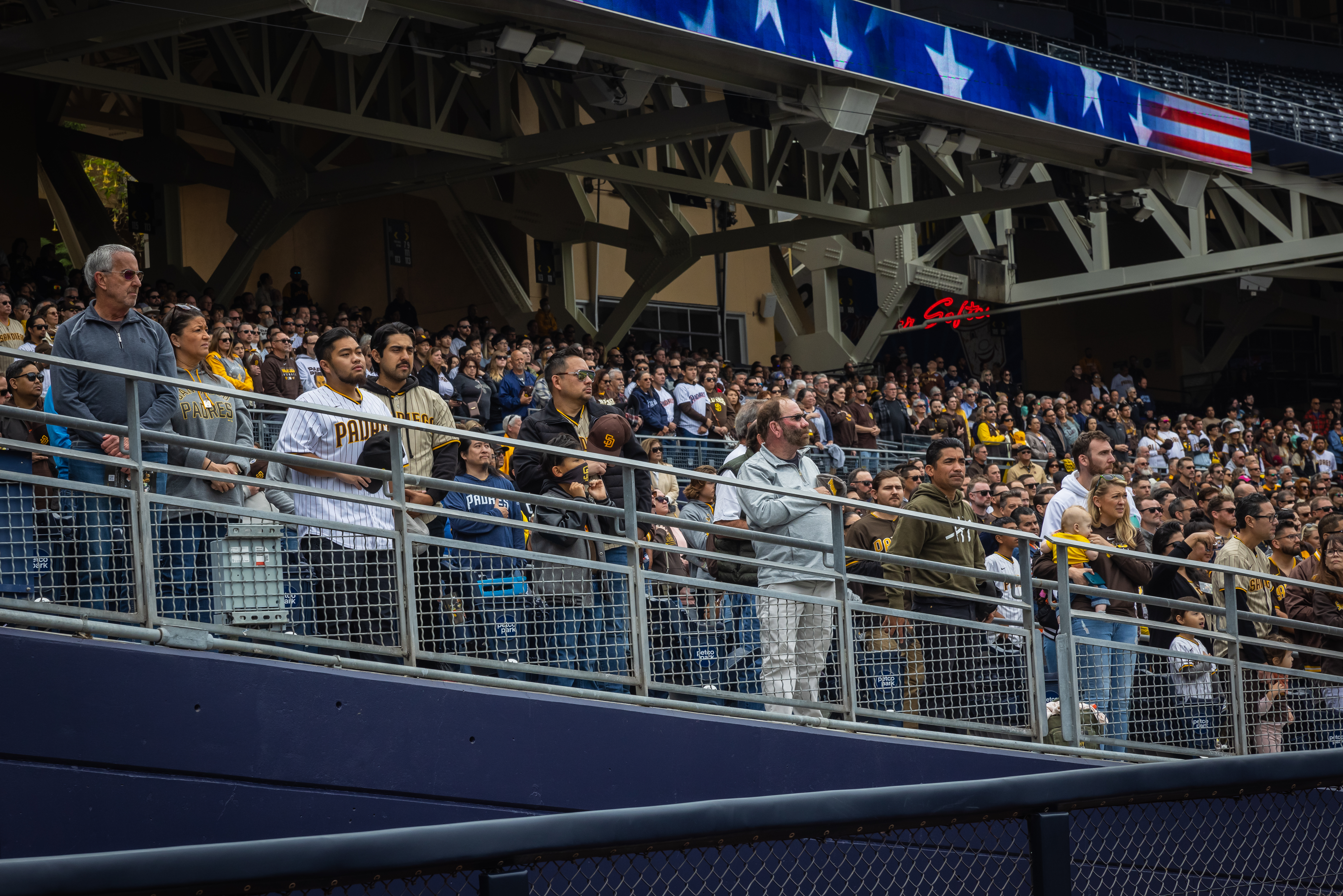
"Celebration of life ceremony" in honor of Seidler at Petco Park in March 2024

Seidler and his wife, Sheel, had three children. They lived in the La Jolla neighborhood of San Diego, California.

Seidler had type 1 diabetes. He also survived two bouts with non-Hodgkin lymphoma.

In September 2023, Seidler announced that he had undergone a medical procedure which would prevent him from attending any further games in the 2023 season. He died in San Diego on November 14, 2023, at age 63. His brother, John, succeeded him as the team's control person.

== See also ==
- List of San Diego Padres owners and executives
