= Buchler =

Buchler is a German surname. Notable people with the surname include:

- Johnny Buchler (1930–2017), South African rugby union player
- Justus Buchler (1914–1991), American philosopher, author and professor
- Samuel Buchler (1882–1971), President of the Federation of Hungarian Jews in America

== See also ==
- Büchler
