= Peter O'Malley =

American baseball executive

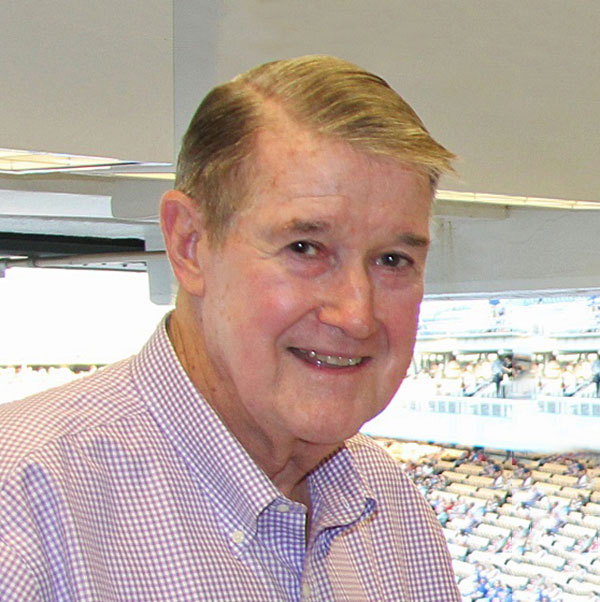
- O'Malley at Dodger Stadium in 2015
- Born: December 12, 1937 (age 88); Brooklyn, New York, U.S.
- Education: University of Pennsylvania; Wharton School of Business
- Occupations: Former President and CEO of the Los Angeles Dodgers
- Spouse: Annette Zacho (m. 1971; died 2023)
- Children: 3
- Parents: Walter O'Malley (father); Katherine "Kay" Hanson (mother)
- Relatives: Terry O'Malley Seidler (sister); Peter Seidler (nephew); John Seidler (nephew)
- Baseball career

Career highlights and awards
- As president: 2× World Series champion (1981, 1988)

Peter O'Malley (born December 12, 1937) is an American former owner (1979–98) and president (1970–98) of the Los Angeles Dodgers of Major League Baseball (MLB). He currently is a part-owner of the San Diego Padres since 2012.

== Early life ==
O'Malley was born at Carson C. Peck Memorial Hospital in Brooklyn, New York, to long-time Dodger owner and National Baseball Hall of Fame executive Walter Francis O'Malley (1903–79) and Katherine Elizabeth "Kay" Hanson (1907–79). He has a sister, Therese "Terry" O'Malley (born 1933), who was co-owner of the team.

O'Malley graduated from the University of Pennsylvania, where he was president of his fraternity Phi Gamma Delta, and from the Wharton School of Business in 1960.

== Career ==
=== Los Angeles Dodgers ===
In 1962, O'Malley was named the director of Dodgertown, the team's spring training headquarters located in Vero Beach, Florida. In 1965, he became president and general manager of the minor league Spokane Indians of the Pacific Coast League, where many future Dodger stars and coaches were on the roster.

In 1967, O'Malley moved to the major league club as vice president of stadium operations and in 1969, as executive vice president. He took over the presidency of the Dodgers from his father on March 17, 1970. His father, Walter, who had been Dodger Chairman of the Board since that date, died on August 9, 1979.

O'Malley has been widely credited with running the Dodgers as a professional, highly respected and emulated organization, operated with consistent methods and values, encompassing a style known as "The Dodger Way." Among his unique business practices were treating his staff to ice cream at 2 p.m. every day the Dodgers were in first place, freshly baked cookies on sell-out games and overseas trips in the offseason after particularly successful years. In 1997, Fortune magazine named the Dodgers as the only sports franchise selected as one of the "100 Best Companies to Work for in America." It was the third time the team had received the recognition after being named in books of that title in 1984 and 1993.

On March 19, 1998, Rupert Murdoch and News Corporation (then the parent company of the Fox Television Network) acquired the team for what was alternately reported as $311 million or $350 million (equivalent to $570 to $640 million in 2025). This was the highest price ever paid for a US sports franchise at the time.

O'Malley relinquished the club presidency to become Dodger chairman of the board; he resigned that post at the end of the 1998 baseball season. Murdoch appointed NewsCorp subsidiary's Fox Television executives to oversee the Dodgers, with mixed results. The sale was reported as an estate and tax planning move for the O'Malley family, as Terry had ten children and Peter three. None had immediately emerged as a candidate to succeed Peter, and he acknowledged that the new economics of the game had dictated that the days of family baseball ownership, without support of a separate corporation, were largely over. NewsCorp sold the Dodgers in 2004 for $430 million (equivalent to $700 million in 2025) to Frank McCourt, a Boston developer.

=== International baseball ===
At the age of eight, Peter O’Malley had the opportunity to witness international baseball as he joined his parents Kay and Walter O’Malley and sister Terry to watch the International League’s Montreal Royals with their star Jackie Robinson play a game in Montreal on September 5, 1946. Robinson had signed a minor league contract with the Dodgers on October 23, 1945 and was preparing for his major league debut for the Brooklyn Dodgers the next April. In 1947, the Dodgers held spring training in Havana, Cuba and Peter again experienced baseball outside of the United States. In March 1948, the O’Malley family watched the Dodgers train in Ciudad Trujillo, Dominican Republic before the team’s first-ever visit to newly-created Dodgertown, Vero Beach, Florida.

In fall 1956, when the Dodgers made a month-long Goodwill Tour to Japan, 18-year-old Peter enjoyed experiencing the culture of Japan, its people, its professional baseball and seeing firsthand the opportunity that the sport has to bring countries together. He dedicated himself to taking advantage of that. The Wall Street Journal took notice of the impact of the 1956 Dodgers Goodwill Tour in its powerful headline on May 9, 2016, “Sixty Years Ago, the Dodgers Toured Japan and Changed Baseball Forever”. The article by Brad Lefton explains the friendship that started between the O’Malley family and the Tokyo Yomiuri Giants, as the National League champion Dodgers made the 19-game trip to Japan. But, more importantly, the building of bridges and expansion of those bonds led to more and more exchanges through the decades and the ultimate: the 1995 Dodger signing of Japan-born pitcher Hideo Nomo, who became a pioneer in baseball.

In spring, 1961, the entire Tokyo Yomiuri Giants team trained for the first time at Dodgertown, as fresh out of college Peter was responsible for all the Giants’ arrangements and schedule from arrival to departure. That is when he became friends with two of Japan’s greatest Hall of Fame players – Sadaharu Oh and Shigeo Nagashima.

The Dodgers returned to Japan for their 1966 Goodwill Tour and again Peter made the trip with his parents. They were happy to see the growth of professional baseball in Japan since their last visit a decade earlier. Toru Shoriki, owner of the Tokyo Yomiuri Giants, traveled with Dodger Vice President Peter O’Malley in August, 1967 to select Pacific Coast League sites, including Spokane, WA, to observe their minor league operations. On March 17, 1970, Peter was named Dodger President and that fall, he attended the Japan Series as a guest of Shoriki, becoming the first official of an American major league team to watch a Japan Series (the Giants beat Lotte), as initially reported in the Los Angeles Times.

In 1974, Peter traveled to Taiwan and the Philippines to meet with baseball leaders and learn more about youth and amateur baseball in those countries. To aid youth baseball, he sent a new pitching machine to the Philippines. In 1977, he arranged for the Dodgers to play the New York Mets in the Dominican Republic, the first exhibition of two major league teams in that baseball-loving and talent rich country.

Two of baseball’s most significant events took place in 1979. First, the signing of pitcher Fernando Valenzuela from Mexico. That led to the 1981 phenomenon of “Fernandomania” throughout the world as the National League Rookie of the Year had eight shutouts and 11 complete games. Peter was quoted, “I have often said that Fernandomania was the most exciting time for me.” Thousands of Latino fans became enamored by Valenzuela and followed his every game pitched. With Valenzuela’s success, Mexico was actively mined for more talent by scouts.

The other event was when Peter hosted September 10–12 meetings of 100 baseball leaders from 38 countries at the Association International Baseball Amateur (AINBA) Extraordinary Congress in Los Angeles to devise a plan for baseball to be included in the 1984 Games of the XXIII Olympiad in L.A., with a long-term strategy to earn gold medal status in future Olympics.

To a man, the international leaders have called it the most important meeting for the future of the game, laying the groundwork that led to baseball being included in the Olympic Games. First, as a demonstration sport in 1984 at Dodger Stadium, Los Angeles, and in the 1988 Seoul Olympics, and then with gold medal status in 1992 at Barcelona (see 1984 Olympic Baseball, Los Angeles section for further information).

==== 1980 China trip ====
From February 14–16, 1980, O’Malley traveled to the People’s Republic of China for the first time and met with leaders of the All-China Sports Federation. As friendships were established, O’Malley invited China’s baseball leaders to Dodger Stadium in July, 1980 and again during the 1984 Olympic Baseball tournament. He returned to China from October 10–15, 1984, before sending two instructors, Kevin Kennedy and Tim Johnson, to hold baseball clinics in Kunming for two weeks beginning December 1, 1984. Kennedy and Johnson later became major league managers.

==== 1984 Olympic baseball, Dodger Stadium ====
“I have often said that being involved with international baseball was my hobby and it has been rewarding in many ways,” said Peter O’Malley. “I was honored to be invited by (International Baseball Association President) Dr. Robert Smith to help him in his efforts to have baseball recognized as an official Olympic sport. He put together a kitchen cabinet including Baseball Commissioner Bowie Kuhn, legendary baseball coach Rod Dedeaux at University of Southern California and myself. We were organized, effective and successful, celebrating on April 9, 1981 when the IOC first included baseball as a demonstration sport in Los Angeles.”

Baseball’s largest involvement in the Olympic Games included eight nations competing – Canada, Chinese Taipei, Dominican Republic, Italy, Japan, Nicaragua, South Korea, and the United States. In prior Olympics, baseball consisted mostly of single exhibition games. From July 31–August 7, 1984, 16 international exhibition games were played in the tournament at Dodger Stadium, Los Angeles before enthusiastic, sold-out crowds. Japan won the finals, 6-3 against the USA, providing the impetus for baseball in future Olympics as a medal sport. Baseball finished third in overall attendance for those Games, outdrawn by only track & field and soccer.

Dr. Smith, O’Malley, Dedeaux and Kuhn continued their travels to many countries (Japan, Russia, China, South Korea, Nicaragua, Italy, Switzerland, Netherlands, Taiwan) to meet with IOC members and seek their support. They received support from U.S. President Ronald Reagan for the 1988 Seoul Olympics as baseball was once again a demonstration sport and assistance in development to many nations followed.

“The Dodgers have been absolutely marvelous in what they have done to help the game internationally,” said longtime International Baseball Association President Dr. Smith. “No organization has done more, and few have come close. Peter O’Malley has one of the biggest views toward the future of developing baseball around the world. Since the AINBA Baseball Congress in 1979, virtually everything that has been done in the area of international baseball has the fingerprints of the Dodger organization. I believe that Peter O’Malley is probably the single-most important person in getting baseball into the Olympics.”

==== Building baseball fields ====
Peter O’Malley went above and beyond offering instructors to help instruct baseball at Dodgertown, Vero Beach, Florida, and in many countries around the globe, as he also personally financed the building of baseball fields in three countries – the People’s Republic of China (1986), Nicaragua (1992) and Ireland (1998).

==== China ====
Inspired by his friend Dr. Shigeyoshi Matsumae, the founder of Tokai University, Tokyo, Peter O’Malley located a site for building the first baseball field in Tianjin, China. He said, “China was important in the International Olympic Committee community and I wanted China to realize that they had a baseball friend in the United States who was willing to help them develop baseball. (Assistant) Ike (Ikuhara) and I made several trips to China considering different locations for the field and finally selected Tianjin Institute in Tianjin.”

On November 6, 1985, O’Malley wrote in a letter to Dr. Matsumae, “It seems to me that now is the perfect time to build a baseball field in Russia and I am anxious to discuss this long time dream of yours with you.”

Surrounded by friends and baseball leaders from several countries (including former Baseball Commissioner Bowie Kuhn, Dr. Bob Smith and legendary University of Southern California baseball head coach Rod Dedeaux) and some of China’s most powerful politicians, O’Malley opened the official-sized grass Dodger Baseball Field in Tianjin, on September 12, 1986, which was used for decades by professional, college and amateur teams as development continued.

O’Malley addressed the crowd at the dedication, “The field is more beautiful than I imagined and I am grateful to the faculty and students for their contribution. The field is yours! My wish to the players is that they enjoy playing baseball here for many years. My wish to the spectators is that this field gives you many hours of entertainment. It is now my dream that this Dodger Baseball Field will enhance both the growth of baseball here and the friendship between the United States and the People’s Republic of China.”

IBA President Dr. Smith said, “Dr. Matsumae went to mainland China for the dedication of a stadium that Peter O’Malley helped the Chinese build. It was there that Dr. Matsumae was inspired to do the same thing with the Soviet Union to help improve international relations.” Dr. Matsumae just happened to be good friends with the president of Moscow State University, known as the campus on Lenin Hills. O’Malley said of Dr. Matsumae, “He hoped international peace would come through the globalization of baseball.” On September 1, 1989, O’Malley stood with Dr. Matsumae and Anatoly Logunov, President of Moscow State University, participating in ribbon-cutting on the field during Opening Ceremonies for Matsumae Baseball Stadium in Moscow.

==== Nicaragua ====
On October 31, 1990, Dodger President Peter O’Malley met with Violeta Barrios de Chamorro, President of Nicaragua. O’Malley was in Managua as a special guest of the Nicaraguan Sports Institute, led by Vice Minister Carlos Garcia, a longtime friend in international baseball. O’Malley had lunch with the Mayor of Managua, Dr. Arnoldo Aleman, who succeeded Mrs. Chamorro as Nicaragua President in 1997. The friendships continued and O’Malley privately built a baseball field for the youth of Nicaragua.

“I offered to help him (Garcia) supporting youth baseball in Nicaragua and build Dodgers Little League Friendship Field in Managua in 1992,” said O’Malley. “I also learned about Major League pitcher Dennis Martinez who was from Nicaragua and I wanted to enhance the Dodgers’ reputation in that country with hopes we would sign the next Dennis Martinez.”

O’Malley funded stadium construction, which would be owned and maintained by Nicaragua, plus he donated needed baseball equipment. Opened January 18, 1992, Dodgers Little League Friendship Field in was “on the grounds of the former (Anastasio) Somoza mansion.” The small stadium, also known in Spanish as “Amistad Dodgers,” had been painted blue out of respect for O’Malley and in honor of the Dodgers, with grandstand seating for 3,000, as well as a press box, three elevated booths, and a scoreboard.

On February 7, 1992, United States Senator Nancy Kassebaum of Kansas, said as reported in the Congressional Record, “On January 18, the owner of the Los Angeles Dodgers, Mr. Peter O’Malley, joined Nicaraguan President Violeta Chamorro in opening the Dodgers Little League Baseball Friendship Field in Managua, Nicaragua. Built with the support of the Dodgers, this field will give thousands of Nicaraguan youngsters an opportunity to play Little League Baseball…

“Mr. President, I commend Mr. O’Malley and the Dodgers for their active support of baseball in Nicaragua. For many years, the Dodgers have promoted international baseball, both on a professional and amateur level. The team has sent coaches to many countries and hosted numerous baseball exchanges. As our world becomes more interdependent, we need more organizations like the Dodgers, more people like Peter O’Malley, who are willing to share their time and resources with those in the developing world.”

==== Ireland ====
O’Malley attended an International Baseball Association meeting on June 6, 1994 where he met Ann Murphy, President of the Irish Baseball and Softball Association (IBSA), founded in 1989. O’Malley wanted to know how baseball could grow in Ireland and was curious about where games were being played. Murphy explained to O’Malley that what Ireland really needed were fields that were exclusively to be used for baseball, because when a soccer field was being used by a baseball team for practice or a game, the soccer team would show up and chase off the baseball players. The country did not have fields designed and dedicated for baseball.

“We looked at five or six different sites,” O’Malley said regarding the process to find a spot with the Irish baseball leadership. “I told the association that I would pay for the building of the ball field and all clearing of the land, but they would own and maintain it.”

O’Malley traveled to Dublin for short trips in February and August of 1995 to review potential sites. The Irish Times reported in August, “It will surprise most – even someone who has been involved in the adult softball leagues here – that there is a Little League in Dublin, never mind one in need of a dedicated venue.” O’Malley said in the article, “Little League baseball is my hobby. I believe in baseball. It’s good for children.”

The Irish baseball leaders – Ann Murphy, national team players and coaches Mike Kindle and Mick Manning, and Barry Sheehan, president, Little League Baseball Ireland, found a perfect spot at Corkagh Demesne Park in Clondalkin, West Dublin that was available to be developed for baseball.

Two baseball fields – O’Malley Little League Field (international standard Little League Field) and Dodger Baseball Field (regulation size adult field) – opened July 4, 1998 with dedication ceremonies and a joyous occasion for the baseball leaders of Ireland. Alongside O’Malley was United States Ambassador to Ireland Jean Kennedy Smith, who threw the ceremonial first pitch. Humanitarian Smith was the younger sister of President John F. Kennedy and served as Ambassador to Ireland from 1993-1998.

The fields were greatly appreciated, used regularly and became the centerpiece of baseball as it continued developing in Ireland.

==== Historic player signings ====
During O’Malley’s Dodger presidency, it was important for him to build international friendships and goodwill through baseball, which included scouting, drafting and signing players from countries around the world.

==== Mexico ====
(See above regarding Fernando Valenzuela)

==== Australia ====
In May, 1984, Australian-born Craig Shipley signed a free agent contract with the Dodgers. He made his Dodger debut on June 22, 1986 becoming the first native-born Australian to play Major League Baseball since Joe Quinn in 1901. Shipley, born in Parramatta, New South Wales, played his first two seasons for the Dodgers in an 11-year MLB career, opening the door for almost 40 more players from Australia.

==== South Korea ====
Dodger international scouts sent great reports about a young right-handed pitcher from South Korea. In September, 1993, Peter O’Malley, along with team physician Dr. Frank Jobe, traveled to Seoul to introduce himself to Chan Ho Park and Park’s parents. O’Malley was thoroughly impressed with Park and vowed to his parents to treat him as a son.

O’Malley announced at a January 11, 1994 press conference at the Oxford Palace Hotel in Koreatown, Los Angeles that the Dodgers had signed 20-year-old Chan Ho Park. “He is definitely a major league prospect, although the timing is uncertain,” O’Malley said. “He could start next season anywhere from Double A to Triple A to the majors.” Park received a $1.2 million signing bonus, which compared closely to the $1.3 million the Dodgers paid pitcher Darren Dreifort, their first-round selection in the June, 1993 amateur draft. Park was also to be assigned a full-time interpreter and attend English classes. When Park made his debut for the Dodgers on April 8, 1994, he became the first South Korea-born player in the major leagues. He won 124 major league games, more than any pitcher from Asia, in his 17-year career. As a pioneer in the major leagues, Park is a hero in South Korea. His courage to play baseball in America and learn a new language and culture opened the door for nearly 30 more players from South Korea to follow him to the major leagues.

==== Japan ====
Hideo Nomo had pitched five seasons in Japan for the Kintetsu Buffaloes in Nippon Professional Baseball, but he wanted to compete on a whole new level in MLB. Using a loophole in Japan to become a “free agent” by retiring from the Buffaloes, he met with the Seattle Mariners and San Francisco Giants prior to visiting with Dodger President Peter O’Malley at Dodger Stadium. Nomo planned to travel next to Atlanta to meet Braves Chairman Ted Turner and to New York to see Yankees owner George Steinbrenner. After Nomo’s first meeting with O’Malley on February 3, 1995, he invited Nomo to meet again February 4. That was the beginning of their mutual trust and friendship. Nomo cancelled his plans to go east and signed a minor league contract on February 12, 1995.

No Japan-born player had been in a major league game for 30 years, since 1965 when pitcher Masanori Murakami played for the San Francisco Giants before an agreement between the U.S. and Japan professional leagues sent him back in 1966.

On May 2, 1995, Nomo made his Dodger debut. His popularity grew quickly as he went 6-0 in the month of June and was selected as the starting pitcher for the National League All-Star team in Texas. He made an impact with two scoreless innings and three strikeouts in the game. With continued success in a Rookie of the Year season, “Nomomania” was born. Fans in Japan watched him live on large screen video screens in 13 major cities. They admired his commitment and the challenges he had overcome – to retire in Japan and come to the United States to play for the Dodger organization; to acclimate into a different culture despite his limited English; to be surrounded by a large contingent of media from both domestically and from Japan; and to develop an understanding of competing players and their strengths and weaknesses, all with high expectations.

Coming off a lengthy 1994–95 MLB strike, Nomo earned remarks from the Los Angeles Times Magazine, who ask if he'd saved baseball during a dark period. Fans traveled from Japan to Dodger Stadium and other stadiums to see pitch. He inspired a generation of baseball players in Japan due to his work ethic and interest in pitching against the world’s best hitters. He helped the Dodgers reach the postseason for the first time since 1988 with his 13 wins and league-leading 236 strikeouts. Nomo continued with the Dodgers, winning 16 games in 1996 and 14 in 1997. He won 123 games in MLB, and in 2014, Nomo was inducted into the Japan Baseball Hall of Fame. Nomo's breakthrough season of 1995 led a string of notable Japan-born players in MLB, from Ichiro Suzuki, to Shohei Ohtani, to Yoshinobu Yamamoto.

==== Dodgertown, Vero Beach, Florida ====
During the presidency of Peter O’Malley, the Dodgers’ longtime spring training home of Dodgertown was constantly utilized to help train many international teams, including Japan’s professional Tokyo Yomiuri Giants (1971, 1975, 1981) and Chunichi Dragons (1988), and South Korea’s professional Samsung Lions (1985, 1992, 1993, 1996 and 1997). Amateur and college baseball teams visited from Waseda University, Tokyo in 1994 and Hanyang University of Seoul in 1996. Many international baseball leaders, players and coaches visited and stayed at Dodgertown as guests of O’Malley from Japan, Mexico, South Korea, Dominican Republic, Italy, Russia, Nicaragua, Ireland, Venezuela, Canada, Puerto Rico, Nigeria, People’s Republic of China, and Australia.

“(Dodgertown), Vero Beach deserves a lot of credit,” O’Malley said in 2013. “The number of players that came there, college or professional, met our people. Whether it was a trainer or instructor, and they would see the team from Japan do it differently, we would learn. At that time of the year everybody was at Dodgertown, the trainers, the doctors, those (international) connections would all be established at Dodgertown.”

On March 9, 1985, MLB Commissioner Peter Ueberroth and the Commissioner of Baseball in South Korea General Jyong-Chul Suh were guests at Dodgertown and took part in first pitch ceremonies. Former commissioner Bowie Kuhn was also in attendance. March 9 was declared as “Samsung Lions Day” in Vero Beach. The Dodgers defeated the Lions, 7-0, at Holman Stadium, in a historic exhibition game, televised on KTTV Channel 11 in Los Angeles, marking the first South Korean team to play a major league team.

On February 22, 1988, Alexander Ardatov and Gela Cheehradze, baseball coaches from Russia, were welcomed by O’Malley to Dodgertown. The coaches stayed on site and met with Dodger personnel to help further development of baseball in Russia. Two weeks later, O’Malley also hosted Ramaz Goglidze, president of the Soviet Union Baseball Federation, as well as Chairman, Foreign Affairs Commission Supreme Soviet Georgia, USSR.

In the spring of 1988, Chunichi Dragons manager Senichi Hoshino, a Japan Baseball Hall of Famer, requested to O’Malley that left-handed pitcher Masahiro Yamamoto stay with the Vero Beach Dodgers in the Single-A Florida State League under the watchful eye and instruction of Akihiro “Ike” Ikuhara, himself a former Asia University head baseball coach and former player at Waseda University, Tokyo. O’Malley gladly approved and Ike took to instructing and helping Yamamoto, who was on the verge of being released. Ike told him, “Never give up. If you do, that’s the end.” With constant encouragement and working on the young pitcher’s mechanics, which included helping him with a screwball as a new pitch, Ikuhara was delighted with Yamamoto’s progress. The young pitcher had a 13-7 record for Vero Beach. Upon Yamamoto’s return to Japan late in the season, he went 5-0 and helped the Dragons win the 1988 Central League Championship.

Yamamoto would have even greater success, as he completed 29 seasons with Chunichi, accumulating 219 wins until his retirement in 2015 at age 50 and was a Japan Baseball Hall of Fame inductee in 2022.

==== Campo Las Palmas Baseball Academy ====
The Dodgers opened Campo Las Palmas, a state-of-the-art baseball academy, on March 21, 1987 in Guerra, Dominican Republic. It was developed on nearly 50 acres of farm land with pastures developed for baseball fields, a clubhouse, a dormitory with wooden bunk beds, kitchen, dining and meeting rooms. Lush tropical landscaping and well-manicured fields would enhance the beauty of the unique baseball locale. Campo produced some of its own garden and farm grown food like sugar cane, while roosters, chickens and pigs wandered the premises. It was all created and designed by Dodger Latin America scout Ralph Avila and O’Malley for young prospects who were discovered on the island, then brought to the camp for education, support and training, and eventually signed or not. The prospects all dreamed of playing baseball in the U.S.

Dedication ceremonies for privately built Campo Las Palmas included the Vice President of the Dominican Republic Carlos Morales Troncoso and Lowell C. Kilday, U.S. Ambassador to the Dominican Republic, O’Malley, Dodger Executive Vice President Fred Claire, Dodger Manager Tommy Lasorda, Coach Manny Mota, Spanish-language broadcaster Jaime Jarrin, former Dodger and actor Chuck Connors, and Dodger Dominican players: first baseman Pedro Guerrero of San Pedro de Macoris, infielder Mariano Duncan of San Pedro de Macoris and pitcher Alejandro Peña of Cambiaso, Puerto Plata.

On-site housing was available initially for some 60 players. Portions of the camp were named for famous Dodgers, including the Walter O’Malley headquarters, Tom Lasorda dining room, the Roy Campanella clubhouse, the Al Campanis classroom and Manny Mota Field. O’Malley and Avila brought in a satellite to beam in television and also supported the then small school Futuro Vivo run by Carmelite sisters in Guerra.

Players who emerged from development at Campo Las Palmas and played for the Dodgers include: infielder Jose Vizcaino, who first played for the Dodgers in 1989; shortstop Jose Offerman who had played just two minor league seasons before his 1990 call-up -- he became a 1995 National League All-Star; Pedro Astacio, who first pitched for the Dodgers on July 3, 1992; outfielder Henry Rodriguez, who got in his first game on July 5, 1992; Hall of Fame pitcher Pedro Martinez, who debuted on September 24, 1992; right fielder Raul Mondesi, who first played for the Dodgers in 1993 and became National League Rookie of the Year in 1994; Wilton Guerrero, second baseman who debuted on September 3, 1996; and third baseman Adrian Beltre, who made his debut with the Dodgers in 1998 and completed a Hall of Fame career with 3,166 hits 20 years later.

In the winter of 1988, at the suggestion of Dodger Manager Tommy Lasorda, 20-year-old catcher and 62nd round Dodger draft pick Mike Piazza expressed a desire and willingness to go to Campo Las Palmas as its first American player. Piazza would receive extra instruction to hone his skills behind the plate and as a hitter, as well as learn to effectively communicate with Spanish-speaking pitchers. Piazza, a Baseball Hall of Fame catcher, furthered his rapid development that offseason.

O’Malley invited the Sinon Bulls of the Chinese Professional Baseball League in Taiwan to train at Campo Las Palmas in the spring of 1997. Sinon became the first team from Taiwan to train in Latin America when they visited Campo Las Palmas. The Bulls trained intensively for 40 days, 10 hours per day. In 1998, the Bulls returned to Campo and the Sinon owner and team president T.F. Yang stayed in accommodations at the camp with his team for five days.

==== 1993 Dodgers Friendship Series to Taiwan and Japan ====
The Dodgers embarked on a two-country fall Friendship Series in October 1993, playing three games in Taipei, Taiwan and two games in Fukuoka, Japan. The Dodgers were the first team from MLB to play exhibition games in Taiwan.

“International baseball is important to me and I have had the goal to bring the Dodgers back to Asia,” said O’Malley. “I said to the players I only want to accept this invitation if you want to go to Fukuoka and Taipei, and if you truly want to make that trip. The enthusiasm of all the players was just as great as mine. I’ve always believed that sports, and in particular baseball, have an opportunity to generate a tremendous amount of goodwill throughout the world.”

O’Malley’s friendship with Taiwan dated back to 1974 when he visited Little League leaders in Taipei. In November, 1989, O’Malley met with P.P. Tang, Commissioner of Taiwan’s Professional Baseball, on how to promote the newly-formed Chinese Professional Baseball League (CPBL). In March, 1990, O’Malley returned to Taiwan and was on the field with Tokyo Yomiuri Giants owner Toru Shoriki, Mexico City Tigres owner Alejo Peralta, South Korea Baseball Commissioner Woong Hee Lee, and Japan Baseball Hall of Famer Sadaharu Oh for the opening of the inaugural season of the four-team CPBL at Taipei Baseball Stadium. O’Malley encouraged baseball leaders from several countries to attend and meet in Taipei.

On October 29, 1993, O’Malley met with Lee Teng-hui, President of the Republic of China and Taiwan National Party at the Presidential Palace in Taipei, along with Aldo Notari, president, International Baseball Federation, Bowie Kuhn, former Major League Baseball Commissioner (1969-1984), Bill White, National League President and star major league player, C.K. Chen, Commissioner, Chinese Professional Baseball League, and Eiichiro Yamamoto, president, Baseball Federation of Japan.

The Dodgers went 1-2 in Taiwan against combined China Professional Baseball League teams, before losing the two games at the newly-opened Fukuoka Dome against Japan’s professional Daiei Hawks combined with select players from the Tokyo Yomiuri Giants.

Longtime O’Malley assistant Ike Ikuhara passed away on October 26, 1992 and the Dodgers dedicated the tour to Asia in his honor the next year by wearing “IKE” sleeve patches. Ikuhara was by O’Malley’s side wherever international baseball friendships were formed. On January 11, 2002, Ikuhara became the only major league executive from the United States to be elected to the Japan Baseball Hall of Fame. Induction ceremonies took place on July 12, 2002 during the Japanese League All-Star Game at Tokyo Dome. O’Malley traveled to Tokyo to participate, alongside Ikuhara’s family members and Dodger executives.

O’Malley also opened the doors internationally, not just on the field, but in the front office as well, welcoming executives to immerse themselves in “the Dodger way” at Dodger Stadium and Dodgertown, Vero Beach, Florida. Representatives from professional baseball leagues, teams and sports organizations were welcomed to spend weeks or months at a time as “interns” interacting with Dodger front office departments to learn about the business side of baseball (publicity, marketing, broadcasting, ticketing, etc.) as well as scouting and player development. This included Heo Koo-Yeon, Jong-Hwan Park, Rex Song and Tai-Il Lee of South Korea; Kenta Kasahara of Japan; and Emilio Butragueño of Spain.

O'Malley was also deeply involved in the U.S. Little League program as longtime chairman of the Little League Foundation.

=== NFL stadium plans ===
In 1996, after earlier consideration and partly owing to a phone call from Los Angeles Mayor Richard Riordan on August 22, 1995, at 3:25 p.m., O'Malley met with NFL officials to discuss the possible construction of a football-only stadium on Dodger-owned property surrounding Dodger Stadium. His plan offered solutions to a number of problems faced by the NFL in locating a team in Los Angeles, following the departure of both the Rams and the Raiders. First, it provided for scarce, centrally located land. Second, the proposal came attached to highly regarded, established sports franchise management via the O'Malley involvement. Third, like Dodger Stadium, the new facility would be privately financed, and thus not entangled in lengthy municipal funding debates. Fourth, the plan called for alignment with an expansion team, meaning that no existing franchise would have to be moved.

Published reports indicated that O'Malley spent upwards of $1 million on an initial round of architectural renderings, land use studies and environmental impact research, and quickly garnered substantial support among NFL owners who would have to vote their approval. As meetings continued over the next year, O'Malley received a call from Mayor Riordan, asking him to cease pursuit of the NFL franchise. The city had decided that the team should play in the Los Angeles Memorial Coliseum, already more than 70 years old, and absent any of the considerable amenities now standard in NFL stadiums. O'Malley reluctantly shelved his work and withdrew, noting that while he believed strongly in the viability of his proposal, "you can't fight City Hall." The Rams, however, would return to Los Angeles from St. Louis in 2016; a year later, the Chargers also relocated to Los Angeles from San Diego.

=== Purchase of the San Diego Padres ===
On November 2, 2011, one day after the announcement that Frank McCourt would be selling the Dodgers, O'Malley expressed interest in repurchasing his former team. He withdrew his bid on February 21, 2012. In August 2012, O'Malley formed a partnership with Ron Fowler, nephews Tom and Peter Seidler, and sons Brian and Kevin O'Malley which purchased the San Diego Padres.

At the time of the purchase, O'Malley's nephew said that O'Malley, the team's minority owner, would serve as a "sounding board and patriarch" for the Padres front office.

== Personal life ==
O'Malley was married to Annette Zacho from 1971 until her death on July 20, 2023. They had three children together: daughter Katherine, and sons Brian and Kevin who were part of the group who purchased the Padres.

== Honors and Recognitions ==
- Korea Baseball Commissioner Heo Koo-Youn presented to O’Malley a replica of the Korean Series Championship trophy as a special honor with recognition on all sides of its base for O’Malley’s longtime “commitment and dedication” to baseball in South Korea (2023)
- Received the World Baseball Softball Confederation “Order of Honour” at the 4th Ordinary Congress in Taipei, Taiwan on July 4, 2022. Riccardo Fraccari, President, WBSC, made the presentation to O’Malley on July 19 at the Reagan Room of the Jonathan Club, Los Angeles for “for all you have done for our sport during your entire life, including the inclusion of baseball as a demonstration sport in LA84 Olympics. The Order of Honour represents the supreme honour awarded to those persons who have acted in such a way as to illustrate the ideals of baseball/softball and their outstanding merits in favour of the development of our sport and who have rendered exceptional services to baseball/softball.” (2022)
- Order of the Rising Sun, 3rd Class, Gold Rays with Neck Ribbon (2015)
- Named an “Honorary Citizen of Tianjin of the People’s Republic of China” by the People’s Government of Tianjin (1991)
- Appointed member, Los Angeles Olympic Organizing Committee Board of Directors (1979)
- Inducted into the Irish-American Baseball Hall of Fame, New York (2013)
- Medallion of Merit from the Friendly Sons of St. Patrick, Los Angeles (2013)
- The Los Angeles Dodgers, with O’Malley as president, were the only sports organization to receive recognition on three occasions as one of “The 100 Best Companies to Work for in America.” The first time they were named in the book of the same name was in 1984, and were included on the list of 100 in 1993 and again in 1997. The Dodgers were one of only 18 companies to be named in all three editions.

Business positions
| Preceded by Walter O'Malley | President of the Los Angeles Dodgers; 1970–1998 | Succeeded by Bob Graziano |
| Preceded by Walter O'Malley | Chairman of the Los Angeles Dodgers; 1980–1998 | Succeeded by Robert A. Daly |
