= Büchler =

Büchler or Buechler is a German surname. Notable people with the surname include:

- Adolf Büchler (1867–1939), Austro-Hungarian rabbi, historian and theologian
- Heinrich Bichler (also Hans Bichler, Heinrich Büchler or Hans Büchler), Swiss painter
- Jean-Pierre Büchler (1908–1993), Luxembourgish politician
- John Carl Buechler (1952–2019), American director, actor, and special effects and makeup artist
- Jud Buechler (born 1968), American professional basketball player
- Markus Büchler (born 1955), German surgeon and university professor
- Nicole Büchler (born 1983), Swiss pole vaulter
- Sándor Büchler (1869–1944), Hungarian rabbi and educator

== See also ==
- Buchler
