= Jeff Moorad =

American businessman

- Born: Jeffrey Shawn Moorad; Modesto, California, U.S.
- Education: UCLA (BA); Villanova University School of Law (JD)
- Occupations: Sports agent, business executive, investor

Jeffrey Shawn Moorad is an American businessman and investor. He began his career as a sports agent, before serving as General Partner and CEO of MLB's Arizona Diamondbacks, and vice-chairman and CEO of MLB's San Diego Padres as well as extended the San Diego partnership by acquiring the St. Louis Blues for Padres ownership.

== Player representation ==
Moorad began specializing in athlete representation in 1983. He concentrated on Major League Baseball and signed a number of athletes, including Will Clark and four other members of the United States national baseball team in the 1984 Summer Olympics. In 1985 he partnered with Leigh Steinberg, and the two would go on to work together for eighteen years and negotiate more than $3 billion in athlete contracts. Their firm, 'Steinberg & Moorad,' represented such athletes as Steve Young, Troy Aikman, Warren Moon, Manny Ramirez, CC Sabathia, Vernon Wells, Edgerrin James, Ed Reed, Pat Burrell, Darin Erstad, Adam Dunn, Luis Gonzalez, Orlando Hernandez, Thurman Thomas, Eric Karros, Iván Rodríguez, Mo Vaughn, Shawn Green, Raul Mondesi, and Nikola Jokić among many others. 'Steinberg & Moorad' was sold in October 1999 to the Assante Corporation, a Canadian asset management firm, for a reported $120 million.

Moorad was named to The Sporting News’ annual 100 Most Powerful People in Sports on eight occasions.

== Major League Baseball ==
=== Arizona Diamondbacks ===
In 2004, Moorad became an owner and CEO of the Arizona Diamondbacks. He owned close to 12% of the team, estimated to be worth around $18 million in 2009. While with Arizona, Moorad was a general partner, chief executive officer, and spokesman for the Diamondbacks ownership group, and oversaw the day-to-day operations of the franchise.

=== San Diego Padres ===
In 2009, Moorad put together a group to buy the San Diego Padres from John Moores. Moorad and his group of 12 investors (including former client Troy Aikman, billionaire Chairman/CEO of Save Mart Supermarkets Bob Piccinini, and then-CEO of Panda Express Tom Davin) began purchase of the team with Moorad serving as club CEO and vice-chairman. The sale was valued at about $500 million, and the group planned to purchase the team over five years. During this time, Moorad's group also purchased the Padres' minor league Triple-A team, the Portland Beavers.

In 2010, Moorad was named one of San Diego's Most Admired CEOs by the San Diego Business Journal. In April 2012, Moorad negotiated a new TV deal that would lead to the creation of Fox Sports San Diego, and bring in over $1.2 billion for the Padres over the next 20 years.

By 2011, Moorad had sold his 12% share of the Diamondbacks. By January 2012, Moorad and his group held 49% ownership of the Padres, when MLB deferred voting on approval for the group to complete the sale with Moores. In March 2012, Moorad withdrew the group's application to complete the full purchase of the Padres. He stepped down as CEO of the Padres later that month, but remained with the team as vice-chairman. Some media outlets speculated that Moorad was short of the needed support of 22 MLB team owners to complete the purchase of the Padres, though only two were suspected of opposing completion of the purchase. Moores declared the entire team was up for sale again in April, citing the good opportunity after the record $2 billion sale of the Los Angeles Dodgers; Moorad's minority group would receive 49% of the proceeds of any sale of the Padres. Moorad was succeeded by Ron Fowler as lead of the group of any owners transferring ownership to the new purchase. In August, the Padres were sold for $800 million, a $300 million increase over the valuation in Moorad's 2009 purchase.

== Moorad Sports Partners ==
In 2013, with partner Greg Byrnes, Moorad founded Moorad Sports Partners, an investment management company that pursues opportunities in sports-related businesses, including the purchase and management of professional sports franchises.

=== PrimeSport ===
In February 2015, Moorad Sports Partners, along with the Carlyle Group and RSE Ventures, acquired PrimeSport Holdings Inc., a global sports travel and events-management company. Moorad served as PrimeSport's Chairman until its sale to On Location Experiences at the end of 2017.

=== Family Circle Tennis Center ===
In October 2017, Moorad Sports Partners, along with musician Darius Rucker, acquired the long-term rights to the Family Circle Tennis Center in Charleston, South Carolina. The center consists of 17 courts, including the 10,200-seat Volvo Car Stadium. The center hosts concerts, outdoor events, and tennis tournaments, including the WTA Tour's Charleston Open.

== Morgan, Lewis, & Bockius ==
In September 2017, Moorad joined global law firm Morgan, Lewis & Bockius LLP, where he serves as a partner and chairman of the firm's global sports practice. Moorad leads a team of more than 50 lawyers assisting clients on sports matters such as stadium and team finance, mergers and acquisitions, media rights, intellectual property, labor and employment, tax, litigation, retail and merchandising, antitrust regulations, and other sports business issues.

Moorad also serves as a principal of Morgan Lewis Consulting, which helps businesses navigate through complex regulatory and legal issues in the U.S. and abroad.

== MSP Sports Capital ==
In 2019, Moorad along with partners Jahm Najafi, Arne Rees, and Steve Wasserman, formed MSP Sports Capital, a sports investment company with targeted equity and debt investments in properties at the intersection of sports, global media rights, distribution technologies, content creation, sponsorship, esports, betting, and data. MSP is headquartered in New York City.

In July 2019, MSP partnered with David Blitzer and Blitz Capital to acquire G.D. Estoril Praia, a Portuguese football club in Estoril, Cascais. Later that year, in September, MSP partnered with Blitz Capital and former Real Madrid executive Ivan Bravo to acquire AD Alcorcón, a Spanish football club based in Madrid.

In 2020, MSP bought a "significant" minority stake in the McLaren Racing team, with Moorad being named to its board of directors.

In October 2022, MSP acquired a majority stake in the X Games from The Walt Disney Company. The MSP investors include skateboarding legend Tony Hawk, who will serve as a brand steward and join the action sports league's advisory board. ESPN retained a minority interest in the company, and will serve as the X Games domestic linear broadcast partner as part of a multi-year agreement.

== Other business ==
In 1993, Moorad and Steinberg were part of a group that founded Integrated Sports International, which consulted with teams, venues, and corporations on their sports sponsorship and marketing initiatives. ISI also represented athletes and coaches for marketing and broadcasting opportunities. ISI was sold to SFX Entertainment in 1999.

In 1998, Moorad and Steinberg, along with their head of media and investment initiatives, Tyler Goldman, founded Athlete Direct. Athlete Direct managed the official websites and social media platforms of professional athletes, including many Steinberg & Moorad clients. Moorad and Steinberg remained involved until the company's 1999 deal with Sequoia Capital and Redpoint Ventures.

Moorad served on the board of directors for Oakley, Inc., until the sale of the company to Italian manufacturer, Luxottica. Moorad also served on the board of directors for Citizen Sports Network, a digital sports & entertainment company, until its sale to Yahoo! in 2010. Moorad previously owned NASCAR team Hall of Fame Racing.

== Entertainment business ==
Moorad and Steinberg appeared in and served as technical consultants for the 1996 Academy Award-winning picture Jerry Maguire. Moorad and Steinberg were the inspiration behind the Jerry Maguire character played by Tom Cruise.

Moorad was the baseball technical consultant for the Universal picture For Love of the Game and had a cameo appearance in the movie.

== Community work ==
Moorad encouraged his clients to donate millions of dollars to charities and their communities, including their own non-profit foundations and alma maters. Moorad himself endowed a $100,000 baseball scholarship to his alma mater UCLA, where he has taught a 'Business of Sports' class at UCLA's Anderson School of Management since 2013. In February 2012, Moorad committed $5 million to his alma mater Villanova University School of Law for the creation of The Jeffrey S. Moorad Center for the Study of Sports Law.

After Moorad's good friend Augie Nieto (founder, chairman, and CEO of Life Fitness) was diagnosed with amyotrophic lateral sclerosis in 2005, Moorad has been active in helping to raise funds to find a cure for ALS. Moorad serves as a Vice President of the Muscular Dystrophy Association and is on the board of the Translational Genomics Research Institute, both of which he has helped partner with Augie's Quest. Moorad has also served as a chairperson of Childhelp's Drive the Dream Gala.

== Education ==
A native of Modesto, California, Moorad served as student body president of Modesto Junior College, where he graduated with an Associate of Arts degree. He then went on to obtain a Bachelor of Arts in Political Science from UCLA in 1978, and a Juris Doctor from Villanova University School of Law in 1981.

Moorad lives in Newport Beach, California, and has three sons.

== See also ==
- List of San Diego Padres owners and executives
