= Edwin Joseph O'Malley =

American politician (1881-1953)

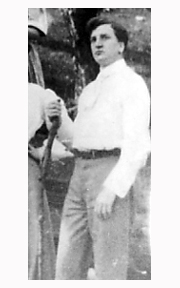
- O'Malley circa 1905

New York City Commissioner of Public Markets, Weights, and Measures
- In office 1919–1927
- Appointed by: John F. Hylan
- Preceded by: William P. Mulry (Acting)
- Succeeded by: Thomas F. Dwyer

Personal details
- Born: Edwin Joseph O'Malley; August 22, 1881 The Bronx, New York City, U.S.
- Died: April 10, 1953 (aged 71) Amityville, New York, U.S.
- Party: Democratic
- Spouse: Alma Feltner (m. 1902–1940)
- Children: Walter Francis O'Malley

Edwin Joseph O'Malley (August 22, 1881 – April 10, 1953) was the Commissioner of Public Markets for New York City.

== Biography ==
Edwin O'Malley was born on August 22, 1881, in Manhattan, New York City, to Thomas Francis O'Malley (1854–1918) and Georgiana Reynolds (1855–1941). He married Alma Feltner (1883–1940) on January 16, 1902, and had one child, a son, Walter Francis O'Malley (1903–1979), who would become the owner of the Brooklyn Dodgers from 1950 to 1979, and who would oversee their controversial move from Brooklyn to Los Angeles.

In 1910, O'Malley was living in the Bronx, New York City, and working as a cotton goods salesman. Around 1911 he moved the family from the Bronx to Hollis, Queens. He registered for the draft on September 12, 1918, but did not serve in World War I. He became a Democratic party ward heeler for Tammany Hall, and was appointed as the Commissioner of Public Markets for New York City by mayor John F. Hylan. He testified on August 18, 1922, before the Kings County, New York Grand Jury, which was investigating the mishandling of the fees paid by vendors to the Public Markets office. No charges were filed.

He died of a heart attack in Amityville, New York, on April 10, 1953, at age 71.

== Court cases ==
- Schumaker v. O'Malley, May 1, 1920
- Matter of Joerger v. O'Malley, December 1, 1923

Preceded by William P. Mulry as Acting Commissioner	Commissioner of Public Markets; 1919-1927	Succeeded by Thomas F. Dwyer
