= Gerard Maxwell Weisberg =

American judge

Gerard Maxwell Weisberg (August 1, 1925 – May 17, 2003) was a justice for the New York State Supreme Court from 1979 to 1994.

== Biography ==
Weisberg was born in 1925. He was a graduate of St. John's, Columbia University and Brooklyn Law School.

Weisberg was deputy commissioner at the New York City Department of License from 1962 to 1966, Commissioner of Public Markets from 1966 to 1968. This became the New York City Department of Consumer Affairs in 1968 and he served until 1969. He was a judge for the New York City Criminal Court from 1969 to 1977, New York Court of Claims judge from 1977 to 1995, a justice for the New York State Supreme Court from 1979 to 1994 and he served as a commissioner for the New York State Civil Service Commission from 1996 to 1998, when he retired.
