= Walter O'Malley =

American businessman (1903–1979)

- O'Malley on the cover of Time magazine, April 28, 1958.
- Born: October 9, 1903; New York City, U.S.
- Died: August 9, 1979 (aged 75); Rochester, Minnesota, U.S.
- Resting place: Holy Cross Cemetery, Culver City
- Education: University of Pennsylvania (B.A.); Columbia University; Fordham University (LL.B.)
- Occupation: Baseball executive
- Known for: Relocating the Dodgers from Brooklyn to Los Angeles
- Spouse: Katherine Elizabeth Hanson (m. 1931; died 1979)
- Children: Therese; Peter
- Parent(s): Edwin O'Malley (father); Alma Feltner (mother)
- Relatives: John Seidler (grandson); Peter Seidler (grandson)
- Baseball career

Career highlights and awards
- 4× World Series champion (1955, 1959, 1963, 1965); Los Angeles Dodgers Ring of Honor

Member of the National

Baseball Hall of Fame
- Induction: 2008
- Vote: 75%
- Election method: Veterans Committee

Walter Francis O'Malley (October 9, 1903 – August 9, 1979) was an American sports executive who owned the Brooklyn / Los Angeles Dodgers team in Major League Baseball from 1950 to 1979. In 1958, as owner of the Dodgers, he brought major league baseball to the West Coast, moving the Dodgers from Brooklyn to Los Angeles despite the Dodgers being the second most profitable team in baseball from 1946 to 1956, and coordinating the move of the New York Giants to San Francisco at a time when there were no teams west of Kansas City, Missouri. In 2008, O'Malley was elected to the National Baseball Hall of Fame for his contributions to and influence on the game of baseball.

O'Malley's father, Edwin Joseph O'Malley, was politically connected. Walter, a University of Pennsylvania salutatorian, went on to obtain a Bachelor of Laws (LL.B.), and he used the combination of his family connections, his personal contacts, and both his educational and vocational skills to rise to prominence. First, he became an entrepreneur involved in public works contracting, and then he became an executive with the Dodgers. He progressed from being a team lawyer to being both the Dodgers' owner and president, and he eventually made the business decision to relocate the Dodgers franchise. Although he moved the franchise, O'Malley is known as a businessman whose major philosophy was stability through loyalty to and from his employees.

In 1970, O'Malley ceded the team presidency to his son, Peter. He would become the first chairman of the Dodgers, a title established for him, and remain so until his death in 1979. During the 1975 season, the Dodgers' inability to negotiate a contract with Andy Messersmith led to the Seitz decision, which limited the baseball reserve clause and paved the way for modern free agency. He bequeathed the team to his children Peter O'Malley and Terry O'Malley Seidler upon his death in 1979.

== Early years ==
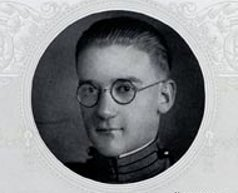
O'Malley's photo from the 1922 Culver yearbook

Walter O'Malley was born on October 9, 1903, in The Bronx, New York City. He was the only child of Edwin Joseph O'Malley (1881–1953), who worked as a cotton goods salesman in the Bronx in 1903. Edwin O'Malley later became the Commissioner of Public Markets for New York City. Walter's mother was Alma Feltner (1882–1940). Walter was a third-generation Irish-American. His great grandfather, John O'Malley, was born in County Mayo, Ireland. O'Malley grew up as a Bronx-born New York Giants fan. He frequently attended Giants games at the Polo Grounds with his uncle Clarence. O'Malley was a Boy Scout who rose to the rank of Star Scout.

O'Malley attended Jamaica High School in Queens from 1918 to 1920 and then the Culver Academy (the eventual high school alma mater of future New York Yankees owner George Steinbrenner) in Indiana. He managed both the baseball and tennis teams, served on the executive staff of the student newspaper, was a member of the Hospital Visitation Committee as well as the debate team, Bible Discipline Committee and the YMCA. At Culver, his baseball career was ended with a baseball that hit him on the nose.

Later, he attended the University of Pennsylvania and graduated in 1926 as the senior class Salutatorian. At Penn, he was initiated into Theta Delta Chi, and he also served as president of the Phi Deuteron Charge. Upon his graduation from the University of Pennsylvania School of Engineering and Applied Science his father gave him a cabin cruiser that slept eight. He was also Junior and Senior class president. O'Malley originally enrolled at Columbia University in New York City for law school, but after his family lost their money in the Wall Street Crash of 1929, he switched from Columbia Law School to night school at Fordham University. Edwin O'Malley's dry goods business was failing and Walter had to help run the business.

== Pre-baseball career ==
After he completed his law degree in 1930 at Fordham Law, he worked as an assistant engineer for the New York City Subway. After earning his law degree he needed to obtain a clerkship, but it was during the depression and no one could afford to hire him. He allowed a struggling lawyer to use space in his office and paid for his own clerkship. After working for the Subway, he worked for Thomas F. Riley, who owned the Riley Drilling Company, and they formed the partnership of Riley and O'Malley. With the help of Edwin O'Malley's political connections, Walter's company received contracts from the New York Telephone Company and the New York City Board of Education to perform geological surveys. Subsequently, Walter started the Walter F. O'Malley Engineering Company and published the Subcontractors Register with his uncle, Joseph O'Malley (1893–1985).

Walter eventually concentrated on the field of law, starting with work on wills and deeds. By 1933, he was senior partner in a 20-man Midtown Manhattan law firm. He developed the business habits of smoking cigars and of answering questions only after taking two puffs. During the Great Depression, O'Malley represented bankrupt companies and enriched himself, while building his thriving law practice. He invested wisely in firms such as the Long Island Rail Road, Brooklyn Borough Gas Company, the New York Subways Advertising Company, a building materials firm, a beer firm and some hotels. His success begot both influence and attention. The Brooklyn Democratic Machine powers such as judge Henry Ughetta and Brooklyn Trust Company president George Vincent McLaughlin were among those who noticed the rising O'Malley.

== Dodgers ==
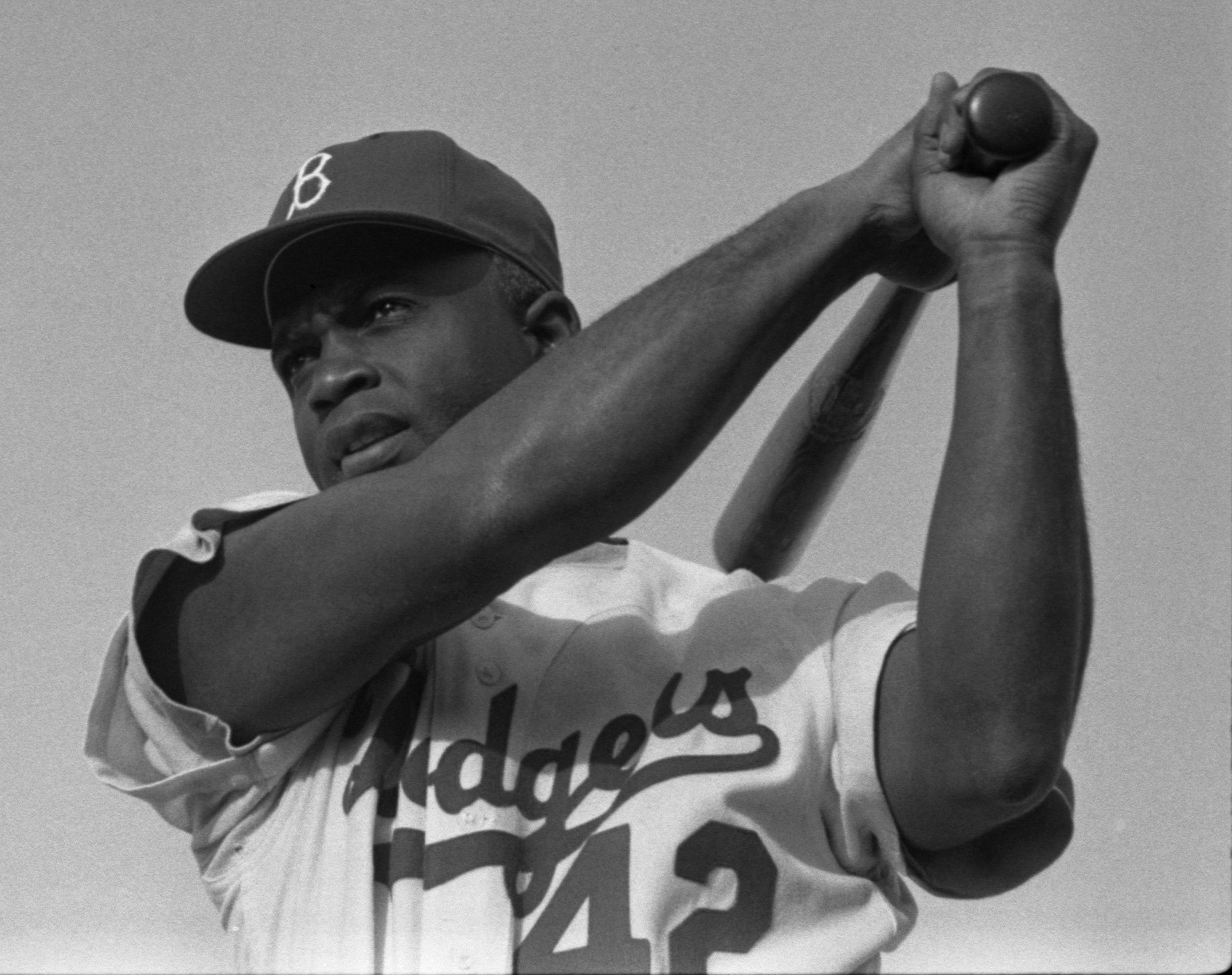
The extent of O'Malley's role in helping Branch Rickey sign Jackie Robinson (pictured) is a matter of some dispute.

McLaughlin had been New York City Police Commissioner in 1926, knew O'Malley's father, and had attended Philadelphia Athletics games with O'Malley when O'Malley was still at the University of Pennsylvania. McLaughlin hired O'Malley to administer mortgage foreclosures against failing businesses for the Trust Company. O'Malley earned McLaughlin's confidence by acting in numerous capacities including bodyguard, valet, chauffeur, adopted son, confidant and right-hand man. The trust company owned the estate of Charles Ebbets, who had died in 1925 and owned half of the Brooklyn Dodgers. It was 1933 when Walter again met George V. McLaughlin, president of the Brooklyn Trust Company. O'Malley was chosen to protect the company's financial interests in the Brooklyn Dodgers in 1933. O'Malley also served as designated driver for the hard drinking McLaughlin. It was through McLaughlin that Walter was brought into the financial arrangements for Ebbets Field in 1940. In 1942, when Larry MacPhail resigned as general manager to serve in the United States Army as a lieutenant colonel, O'Malley was appointed the attorney for the Dodgers, and he obtained a minority ownership interest on November 1, 1944. He purchased 25% as did Branch Rickey and John L. Smith (president of Pfizer Chemical), while the heirs of Stephen McKeever retained the final quarter. In 1943, he replaced Wendell Willkie as chief legal counsel. Branch Rickey, who had built the St. Louis Cardinals into champions, replaced MacPhail, and O'Malley began to accumulate stock in the Dodgers.

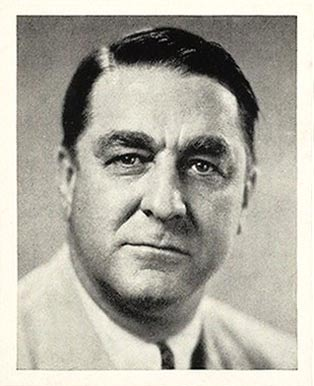
Branch Rickey, the father of the modern farm system and the key figure in signing Jackie Robinson, co-owned the Dodgers in the 1940s, before O'Malley squeezed him out of the organization.

Rickey was a teetotaler, while O'Malley enjoyed alcoholic beverages and tobacco. As O'Malley became more involved in affairs, he became critical of Rickey, the highest-paid individual in baseball, counting salary, attendance bonuses, and player contract sales commissions. O'Malley and Rickey had very different backgrounds and philosophies. It was O'Malley who put pressure on Rickey to fire manager Leo Durocher, who O'Malley felt was a drain on attendance. In board of directors meetings, O'Malley also opposed Rickey's extravagances. When he was with his political friends, he made fun of Rickey at every chance. Daily News columnist Jimmy Powers would deride Rickey for selling off players and for general miserliness. When Rickey asked O'Malley, the team lawyer, if he should sue, O'Malley said no. Powers' campaign became so public that after the 1946 season Rickey gave each player a new Studebaker, which gave O'Malley, a Dodgers shareholder, reason to speak ill of Rickey in the press. It got to the point where everything Rickey did was something O'Malley derided: O'Malley thought Rickey's construction of the state of the art Vero Beach spring training facility, known as Dodgertown, was extravagant; he thought Rickey's investment in the Brooklyn Dodgers of the All-America Football Conference was questionable; he fought Rickey on the team's beer sponsor; and he demanded that players return their 1947 World Series rings before receiving the new ones Rickey ordered. As team lawyer, O'Malley had a role in breaking the racial barrier as well. In particular, he had a significant role in Rickey's top-secret search for suitable ballplayers to break the color barrier and then later he had a role in assessing the ongoing legal risks to the franchise. Other accounts, however, suggest that he played a lesser role in Robinson's signing.

=== Control ===
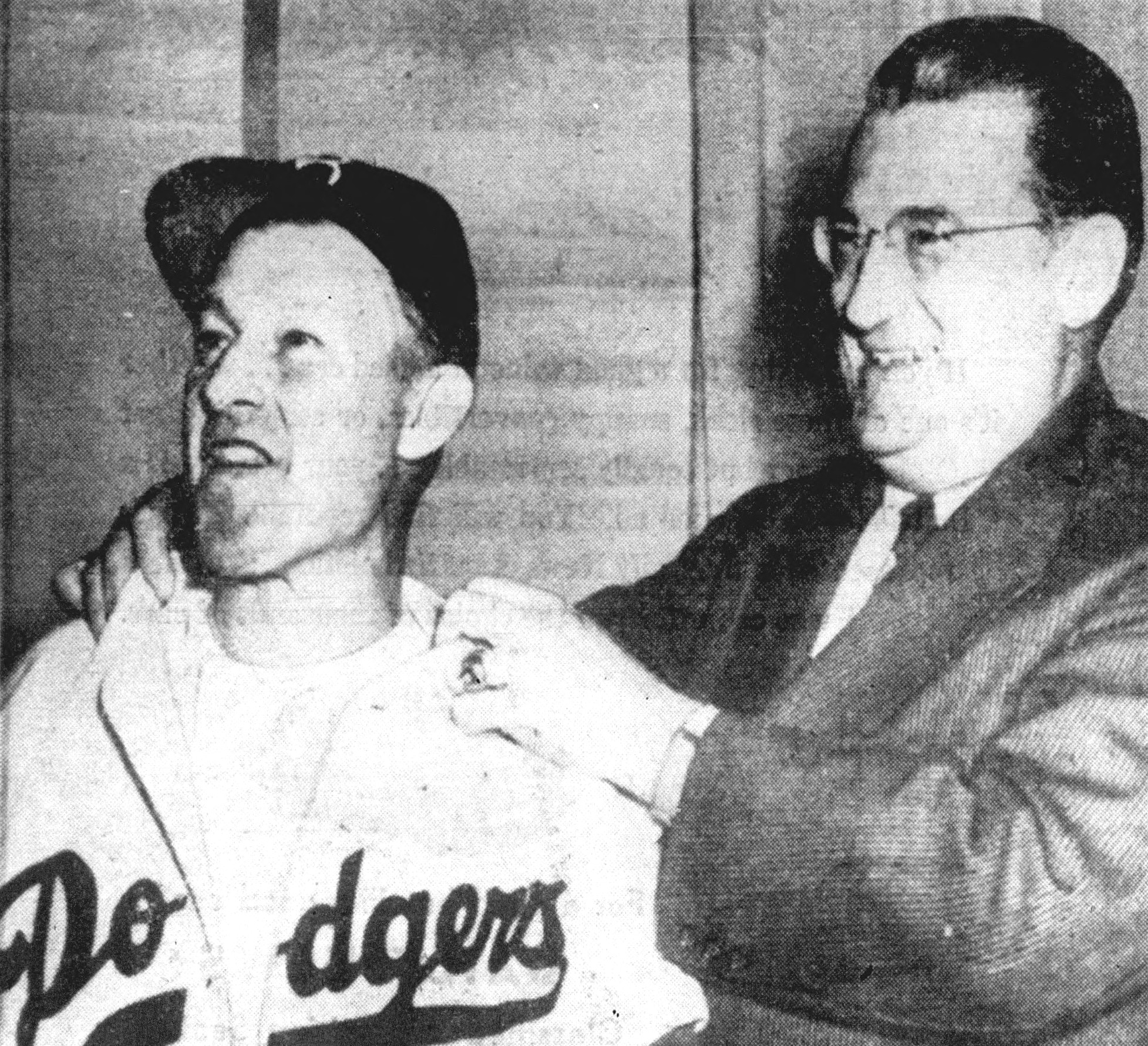
O'Malley (right) with Chuck Dressen in November 1950

When co-owner Smith died in July 1950, O'Malley convinced his widow to turn over control of the shares to the Brooklyn Trust Company, which O'Malley controlled as chief legal counsel. Rickey's contract as general manager was set to expire on October 28, 1950. Rickey's Dodgers stock was held on margin and he had fully leveraged his life insurance policy. O'Malley lowballed Rickey with an offer of $346,000 (the purchase price). Rickey demanded $1 million ($13,400,000 today). O'Malley eventually pursued a complicated buyout of Rickey, who had received an outside offer from William Zeckendorf of $1 million for his interests. There were varying accounts about the sincerity of the offer because Zeckendorf and Pittsburgh Pirates owner John Galbreath were fraternity brothers, but there is a lot of evidence that he had a sincere interest in acquiring the team. The outside offer triggered a clause in the partnership agreement whereby the asking price of a third party had to be matched if a current owner wanted to retain control and the third party would be compensated $50,000. The canceled $50,000 check would later include Rickey's signature showing that Zeckendorf turned over the $50,000 to Rickey.

O'Malley replaced Rickey with Buzzie Bavasi. O'Malley became the president and chief stockholder (owner) on October 26, 1950. O'Malley assumed the title of president from Rickey, who was a trailblazer in baseball both for instituting the farm system and for breaking the racial barrier with Jackie Robinson. According to pitcher Clem Labine and noted author Roger Kahn, the first thing O'Malley did when he took over was assign Bavasi to enamor himself to Dick Young of the Daily News so that O'Malley would not have to worry about ever getting bad press from the Daily News.

After the ownership transfer, O'Malley's rivalry with Rickey became very public. O'Malley forbade the speaking of Rickey's name in Dodgers offices with transgressors being subjected to a fine. He abolished Rickey's title of general manager so that no front office person could perpetuate Rickey's role. In addition, when Rickey assumed the title with the Pittsburgh Pirates, O'Malley arranged for the Dodgers to omit the Pirates from their spring training schedule. Nonetheless, after the transfer, the Dodgers remained successful under O'Malley: they won the National League pennants in 1952, 1953, 1955—the year of their first World Series championship—and 1956. Under O'Malley, the Dodgers were the most overtly political post World War II franchise. In 1951, Brooklyn native and United States Congressman Emanuel Celler's Judiciary Committee investigated whether the reserve clause was in violation of federal anti-trust laws. Celler represented half of Brooklyn in Congress and O'Malley used the local press such as the Brooklyn Eagle to pressure Celler into backing off of the issue. During the 1951 season, the Dodgers engaged former West Point varsity baseball player and U.S. Army General Douglas MacArthur to lure war veterans. O'Malley attempted to entice him to take the post of Commissioner of Baseball. After the 1956 season, O'Malley sold Ebbets Field to Marvin Kratter and agreed to lease the stadium for three years.

Jackie Robinson had been a Rickey protege, and O'Malley did not have the same respect for Robinson that Rickey did. O'Malley referred to him as "Rickey's prima donna". Robinson did not like O'Malley's choice for manager, Walter Alston. Robinson liked to argue with umpires, and Alston rarely did so. Robinson derided Alston in the press. In 1955, Alston played Don Hoak at third base during the exhibition season. Robinson voiced his complaints to the press. Robinson did not get along with Bavasi either, and the three seasons under Alston were uncomfortable for Robinson. Robinson announced his retirement in Look magazine after the 1956 season.

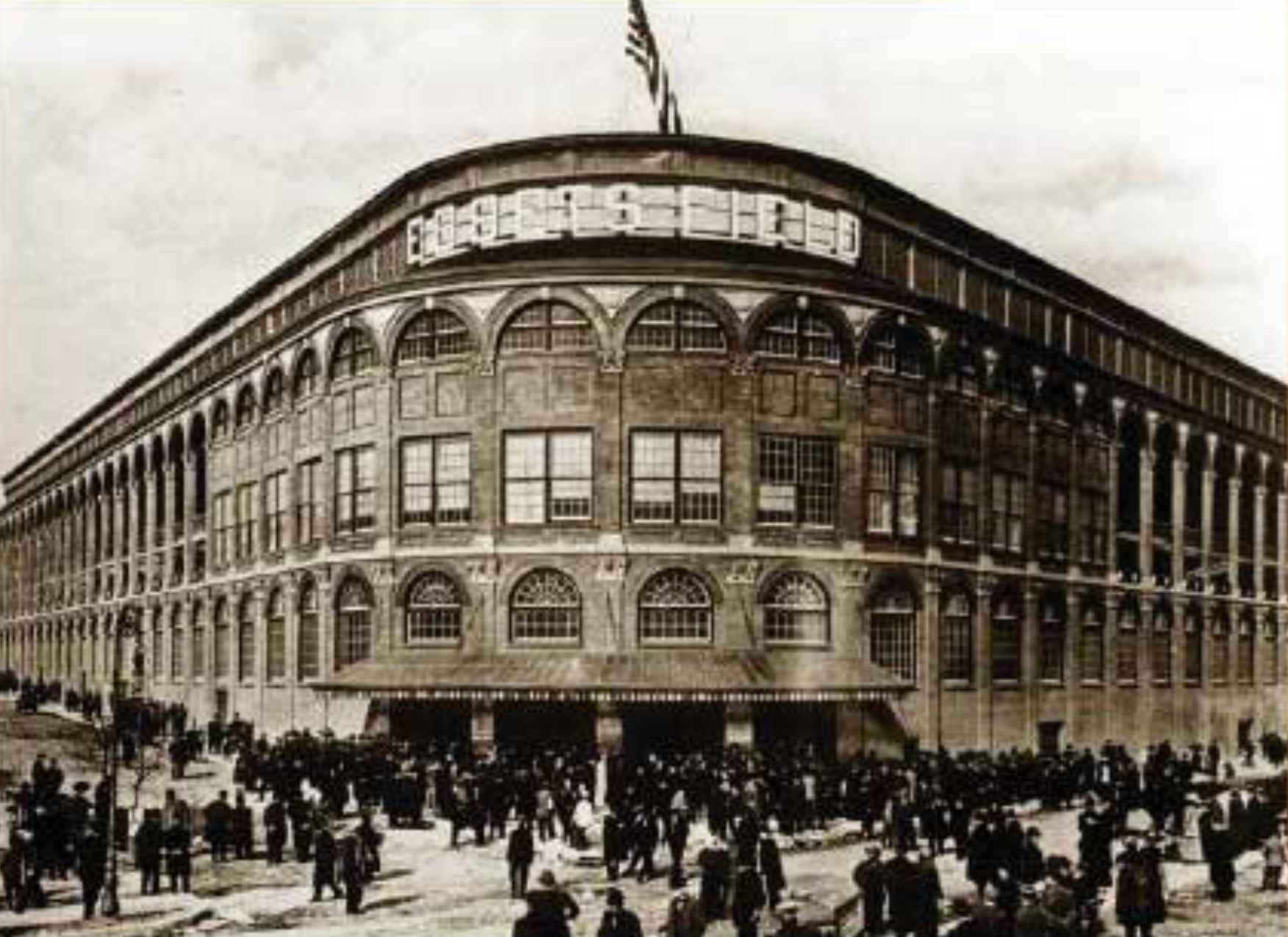
Ebbets Field, built in 1912–13, was the Dodgers' home in Brooklyn before O'Malley moved the club to Los Angeles in 1957.

The signing of Robinson brought the team international fame, making O'Malley an international baseball ambassador to celebrities such as Iraq's King Faisal II. In 1954, Dodgers scout Al Campanis signed Sandy Koufax in large part for two reasons, according to a memo to O'Malley that said "No. 1, he's a Brooklyn boy. No. 2, he's Jewish." Bavasi noted that "there were many people of the Jewish faith in Brooklyn." During the 1955 season, Dodgers catcher Roy Campanella had a medical billing controversy regarding neurosurgery services by Manhattan doctor Dr. Samuel Shenkman. Shenkman billed $9,500, an amount which Campanella forwarded to the Dodgers and the Dodgers refused to pay. O'Malley felt the doctor was overcharging: "It appears that [Dr. Shenkman] thought he was operating on Roy's bankroll..." The Dodgers had convinced Campanella to have the surgery after enduring a slump in 1954 following MVP seasons in 1951 and 1953. The surgery was intended to restore complete use of his hand.

Despite having won the National League pennants in 1947, 1949, 1952 and 1953, they lost to the New York Yankees in the World Series each time, which frustrated O'Malley and all Dodgers fans. In 1955, the team won the World Series for the first time in their history. However, attendance declined from a peak of 1.7 million in 1946 and 1947 to just over one million per year in the mid-1950s. With the advent of the affordable automobile and post-war prosperity, Brooklyn's formerly heterogeneous, middle-class fan base for the Dodgers began to splinter. A large white flight took place, and Ebbets Field's shabby condition and lack of parking spaces led to the loss of fans who relocated to Long Island.

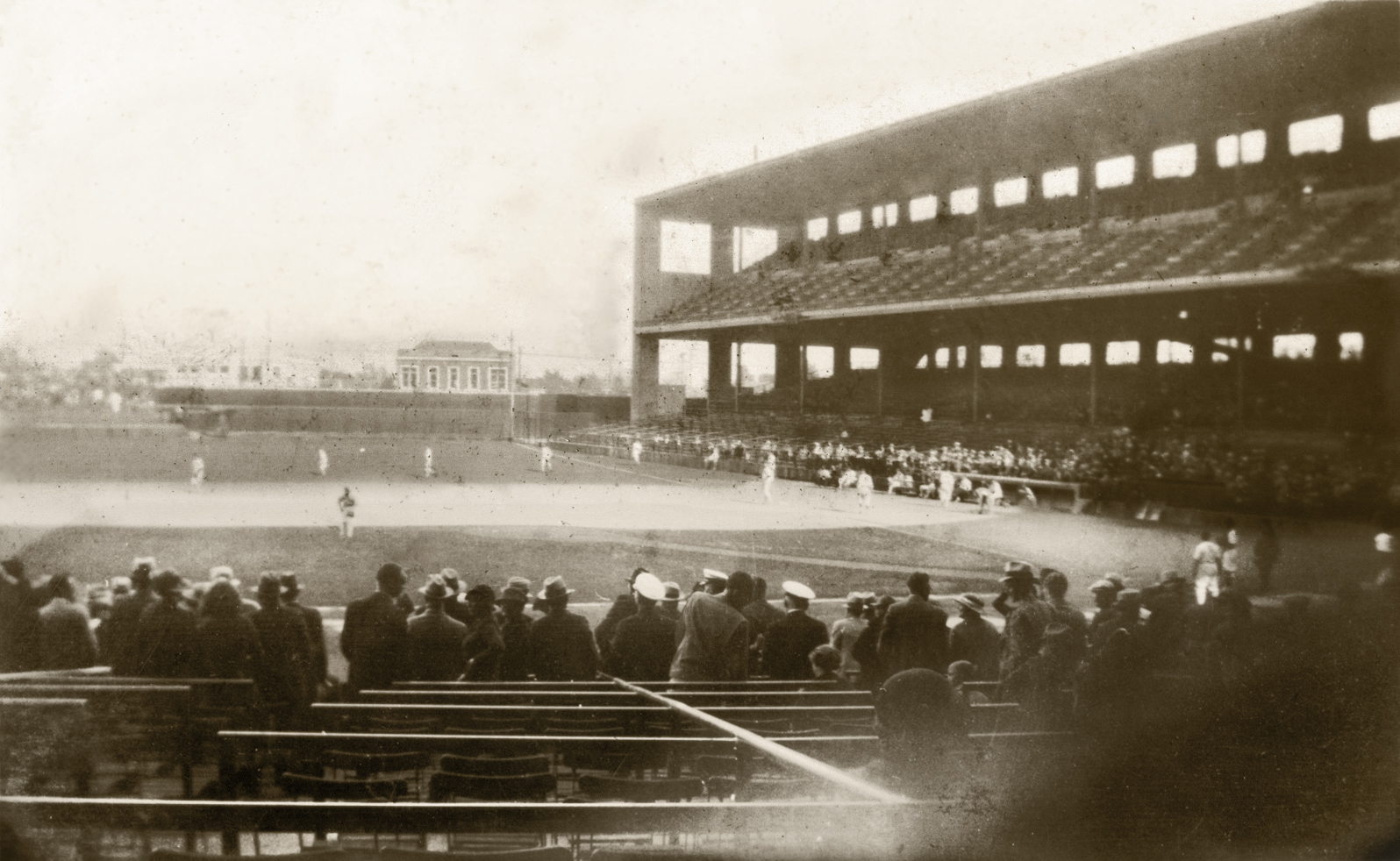
Wrigley Field in Los Angeles, shown here, was bought by O'Malley in 1956 in order to secure the rights to the Los Angeles market for the Dodgers.

O'Malley tried to raise money and get the political backing to build a new ballpark elsewhere in Brooklyn. The one person whose backing he needed was Robert Moses, a powerful figure who influenced development in New York through the Triborough Bridge and Tunnel Authority. O'Malley envisioned a domed stadium near the Long Island Rail Road station on Brooklyn's west end, and even invited R. Buckminster Fuller to design the structure; Fuller, in conjunction with graduate students from Princeton University, constructed a model of the "Dodgers' Dome". Moses did not like O'Malley and derided O'Malley's pro-Brooklyn and pro-Irish sentiments in the press. O'Malley wanted to build a new Brooklyn Dodgers stadium at Flatbush and Atlantic Avenue, but Moses wanted the Dodgers to move to Queens and play in Flushing Meadows Park (the location where the New York Mets play today). Although O'Malley lined up bipartisan political support including New York Governor W. Averell Harriman, Moses blocked the sale of the land necessary for the planned new Brooklyn stadium. O'Malley bought the Chicago Cubs minor league baseball team, the Los Angeles Angels, as well as their stadium, Wrigley Field, from Philip Wrigley in 1956 at the winter baseball meetings, and during spring training, Los Angeles Mayor Norris Poulson traveled to the Dodgers' training camp at Vero Beach, Florida in an attempt to lure the franchise. O'Malley met with Moses at Moses' home after purchasing the Angels to discuss final offers from New York to no avail. O'Malley noticed the great success of the Milwaukee Braves after their move from Boston in 1953. They had a 43,000-seat stadium, parking for 10,000 cars and an arrangement for no city or real estate taxes. He also felt the limitations of the small landlocked Ebbets Field, which held less than 32,111 fans and accommodated only 700 parking spaces. Attendance between 1950 and 1957 was between 1,020,000 in 1954 and 1,280,000 in 1951. O'Malley had sold the ballpark to Marvin Kratter for about $2,000,000 on October 31, 1956. The deal included a five-year lease that allowed the Dodgers to move out as soon as the proposed domed stadium in Downtown Brooklyn was ready for business.

Ultimately, O'Malley decided to leave Brooklyn for Los Angeles in 1957. Robert Moses authority Robert Caro and other contemporaneous sports historians felt that Moses was more to blame for the Dodgers' leaving. The 1956 season had marked the end of the Jackie Robinson era in which the Dodgers won six pennants, lost two pennant series and finished as low as third only once in ten years, and the new era would begin in a new home. During the 1957 season, he negotiated a deal for the Dodgers to be viewed on an early pay TV network by the Skiatron Corporation subject to the approval of other teams and owners. The rest of baseball was not ready for the risks of such a venture and it did not pan out at the time.

=== Move to Los Angeles ===
O'Malley is considered by baseball experts to be "perhaps the most influential owner of baseball's early expansion era." Following the 1957 Major League Baseball season, he moved the Dodgers to Los Angeles, and New York's Dodgers fans felt betrayed. O'Malley was also influential in getting the rival New York Giants to move west to become the San Francisco Giants, thus preserving the two teams' longstanding rivalry. He needed another team to go with him, for had he moved out west alone, the St. Louis Cardinals—1,600 mi (2,575.0 km) away— would have been the closest National League team. The joint move made West Coast road trips more economical for visiting teams. O'Malley invited San Francisco Mayor George Christopher to New York to meet with Giants owner Horace Stoneham. Stoneham was considering moving the Giants to Minnesota, but he was convinced to join O'Malley on the West Coast at the end of the 1957 campaign. Since the meetings occurred during the 1957 season and against the wishes of Commissioner of Baseball Ford Frick, there was media gamesmanship.

On April 15, 1958, the Dodgers and Giants ushered in West Coast baseball at Seals Stadium. When O'Malley moved the Dodgers from Brooklyn the story transcended the world of sport and he found himself on the cover of Time. The cover art for the issue was created by sports cartoonist Willard Mullin, long noted for his caricature of the "Brooklyn Bum" that personified the team. The dual moves broke the hearts of New York's National League fans but ultimately were successful for both franchises – and for Major League Baseball as a whole. In fact, the move was an immediate success as well since the Dodgers set a major league single-game attendance record in their first home appearance with 78,672 fans. During the first year after the move, the Dodgers made $500,000 more profit than any other Major League Baseball team and paid off all of their debts. This did not assuage many Dodgers fans in New York; many years later, newspaper writers Pete Hamill and Jack Newfield each challenged the other to choose the three worst people of the 20th century. Independently, they produced identical lists: "Hitler, Stalin, O'Malley."

In the years following the move of the New York clubs, Major League Baseball added two completely new teams in California, as well as two in Texas, two in Canada, two in Florida, one each in the Twin Cities, Denver, and Phoenix, and two teams at separate times in Seattle. In addition, the Athletics, who had already moved to Kansas City, moved to Oakland; Kansas City would get a new team the year after the A's moved to Oakland. The National League returned to New York with the introduction of the New York Mets four years after the Dodgers and Giants had departed for California.

When he made the decision to relocate in October 1957 to Los Angeles, O'Malley did not have an established location for where the Dodgers would play in 1958. O'Malley worked out a deal with Los Angeles County and the state of California to rent the Los Angeles Coliseum for $200,000 per year for 1958 and 1959, plus 10% of the ticket revenue, and all concession profits for the first nine games of each season following an opening series with the San Francisco Giants. The Dodgers temporarily took up residence while they awaited the completion of 56,000-seat capacity Dodger Stadium, built for $23 million. The Dodgers were soon drawing more than two million fans a year. They remained successful on the field as well, winning the World Series in 1959, 1963, and 1965. The Los Angeles Angels also played in Dodger Stadium from 1962 to 1965.

==== Controversy regarding land deal with city of Los Angeles ====
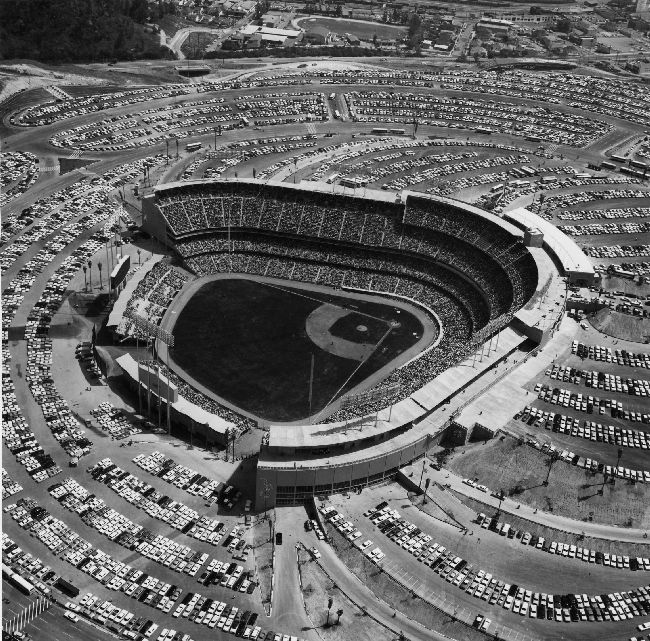
Dodger Stadium, also nicknamed "Chavez Ravine", in the 1960s.

The dealings with the city of Los Angeles after the Vero Beach meeting raised questions. The initial offer of 500 acres (2.02 km^{2}) and tax exemptions was determined to be illegal and improper. The minor league San Diego Padres owners led an opposition effort to stop the transfer of 352 acres (1.42 km^{2}) in Chavez Ravine via a referendum. O'Malley engaged in an extensive marketing and media campaign that helped the referendum pass, but there were extensive subsequent taxpayer lawsuits. The plaintiffs initially prevailed in some of these suits. Finally, during the middle of the 1959 season, the Los Angeles City Council was able to approve the final parcel for the stadium.

One legendary negotiation with the city over concession revenue is that in O'Malley's move to the Coliseum he agreed to accept concession revenues from only half the team's games—the home half. The land was eventually transferred by the Los Angeles city government to O'Malley by an agreement which required O'Malley and the Dodgers to design, build, privately finance and maintain a 50,000-seat stadium; develop a youth recreation center on the land. O'Malley was to pay $500,000 initially, plus annual payments of $60,000 for 20 years; and pay $345,000 in property taxes starting in 1962, putting the land on the tax rolls. Also, the Dodgers would transfer team-owned Wrigley Field, then appraised at $2.2 million, to the city. The city exchanged "300 acres, more or less, in the Chavez Ravine area", while L.A. County Supervisors unanimously agreed to provide $2.74 million for access roads. In addition, the Dodgers also had to pay $450,000 for territorial rights to the Pacific Coast League, whose Los Angeles Angels and Hollywood Stars suspended play.

=== Management philosophy ===
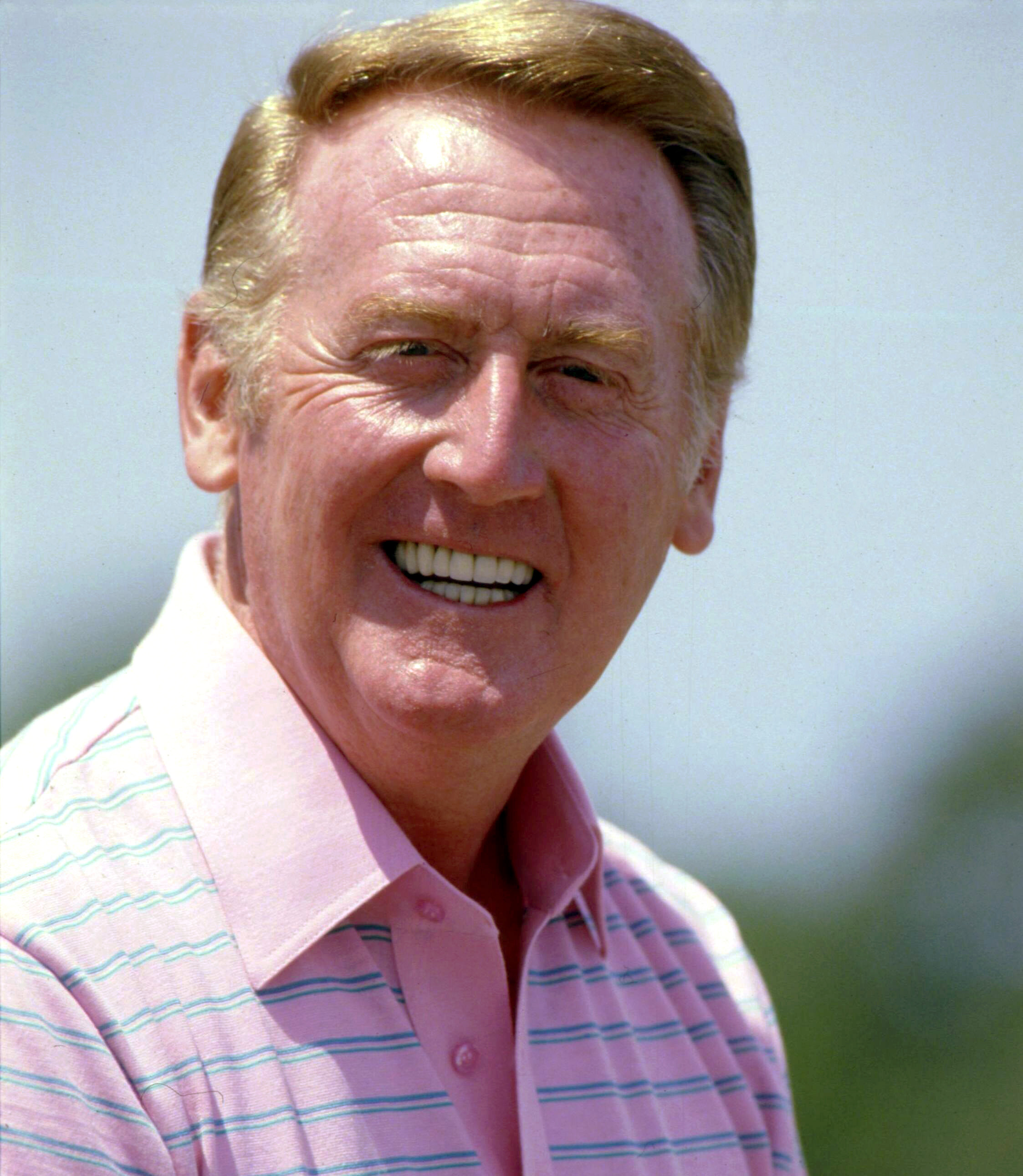
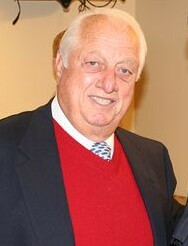
Vin Scully and Tommy Lasorda were longtime O'Malley employees.

His son, Peter O'Malley, described his management style as follows: "As president, the way he ran the business, he believed in stability and very little turnover. It was the strength of the organization. The management team worked as well as the team on the field." This is evidenced in many ways, including the long tenure of both Walter Alston and Tommy Lasorda as Dodgers managers and Vin Scully, the broadcast voice of the Dodgers. Alston was repeatedly rehired to consecutive one-year contracts from 1954 to 1976 until he retired. Then Lasorda, who had been a long-time employee in as a coach and minor league baseball manager, took over as manager for another 20 years. Scully was the voice of the Dodgers for 67 seasons until his retirement in 2016, the infield of first baseman Steve Garvey, second baseman Davey Lopes, shortstop Bill Russell and third baseman Ron Cey was the longest-running intact infield in major league history. Furthermore, O'Malley is said to have kept Bowie Kuhn in office as the Commissioner of Baseball until O'Malley's death. O'Malley rewarded loyal employee Bavasi by allowing the San Diego Padres franchise to establish an expansion team with Bavasi as president in Southern California. Alston said O'Malley convinced him that when he signed his first one-year contract it could be a lifetime job by pointing out that "signing one-year contracts can mean a lifetime job, if you keep signing enough of them." Although O'Malley had good stories of loyalty with some employees, there were several stories of O'Malley's frugality.

Although O'Malley was loyal to his employees, he did not take kindly to demands from employees such as manager Charlie Dressen's request for a three-year contract. When Dressen requested a multi-year contract after losing a second consecutive World Series to the Yankees, he was released. Then when he hired Walter Alston as a replacement, he made it clear to the press that Alston would only receive one-year contracts and would not attempt to show up the management in the national media. There were rumors that Alston even signed blank contracts in the fall and showed up in the spring to find out his salary. O'Malley also did not support those who remained friends with Rickey, which was a large factor in Red Barber quitting as Dodgers announcer.

O'Malley also engaged in several high-profile salary disputes with his players. In 1960, he refused to pay right fielder Carl Furillo for the 1960 season after he was released early due to injury, which led Furillo to sue the team. Because of this, O'Malley allegedly blacklisted Furillo from any job in baseball. In 1966, Sandy Koufax and Don Drysdale engaged in a joint contract holdout. They had earned $70,000 and $75,000 respectively during the 1965 season, during which the Dodgers won the World Series. Both wanted a raise, however, and held out jointly to get a fairer contract negotiation. They demanded three-year $167,000 per year contracts and hired an agent, an entertainment lawyer named J. William Hayes, to negotiate on their behalf; at the time, both multi-year contracts and sports agents were highly unusual. The pair held out until less than two weeks before Opening Day; they received one-year $125,000 and $110,000 contracts respectively.

O'Malley liked clubhouse turmoil only slightly less than free agent disloyalty. When he traded Maury Wills to the Pittsburgh Pirates following consecutive National League pennants, it was attributed to Wills having quit during the middle of the Dodgers' post-season tour of Japan, even though the shortstop only did so because his ailing knees needed rest.

=== Retirement from presidency ===
On March 17, 1970, Walter turned over the presidency of the team to his son Peter, remaining as chairman until his death in 1979. Peter O'Malley held the position until 1998 when the team was sold to Rupert Murdoch. The team remained successful on the field under Peter and won the World Series in both 1981 and 1988. They remained successful at the box office as well: by the end of the 1980s, they had not only become the first franchise to draw three million fans, but also they had done it more times than all other franchises combined.

During the 1970s, O'Malley was credited for stagemanaging Lasorda's career. Lasorda become known for his die-hard Dodgers clichés, such as describing the color of his blood by saying "Cut me, I bleed Dodger blue." It was even said that the reciprocal loyalty and respect between Lasorda and O'Malley was so high that O'Malley gave Lasorda a tombstone as a gift that had an inscription that read "TOMMY LASORDA, A DODGER".

The McKeevers held their 25% interest in the Dodgers until 1975 when Dearie McKeever died. They sold out to O'Malley making him the sole owner of the Dodgers. Also during 1975, the Dodgers franchise was embroiled in the Andy Messersmith controversy that led to the Seitz decision, which struck down baseball's reserve clause and opened up the sport to modern free agency. Messersmith and the Dodgers were unable to come to contract terms in part because of a then unheard of no-trade clause demand, and Messersmith pitched the entire season without a contract under the reserve clause, which stated that team has the right to extend the prior years contract one year if a player does not agree to terms. Teams had previously had the right to continue such re-signings year after year. This gave owners the right to issue "take it or leave it" offers to the players. Although the Dodgers and Messersmith nearly hammered out a deal monetarily, they could not come to terms on the no-trade clause. Supposedly Major League Baseball instructed the Dodgers not to surrender such a clause for the good of the game. The Seitz decision limited the re-signings to one year, and since Messersmith performed quite well in 1975, winning a Gold Glove Award and leading the National League in complete games and shutouts, while finishing second in earned run average, he was a valuable talent. He earned offers from six different teams. Messersmith became the first free agent, except for Catfish Hunter who had been declared a 1974 free agent by breach of contract. O'Malley felt the price wars would be the downfall of baseball because the fans only have so much money. The scenario led to an eighteen-day lockout during spring training in 1976 over the prospect of dozens of players playing becoming free agents and the inability to redesign the reserve clause.

== Personal life ==
On September 5, 1931, he married Katherine Elizabeth "Kay" Hanson (1907–79), whom he had dated since high school, at Saint Malachy's Roman Catholic Church in Manhattan. Kay had been diagnosed with laryngeal cancer in 1927 before the engagement and had to have her larynx removed. She was unable to speak above a whisper the rest of her life. Edwin O'Malley encouraged Walter to break off his engagement, and after Walter refused his parents did not attend the wedding. The couple had two children: Therese "Terry" O'Malley Seidler (born 1933) and Peter O'Malley (born 1937).

In 1944, he remodelled his parents' summer house in Amityville, New York and relocated his family there from Brooklyn. The house was next door to the house Kay had grown up and where her parents lived.

O'Malley was a smoker who golfed occasionally, but more commonly gardened for recreation. As a family man, he attended church regularly, attended Peter's football games at LaSalle Academy, and chaperoned his daughter's dances. On summer weekends, he took the family sailing on his boat, which was named Dodger.

Later in life, the O'Malleys split their time between their homes in Hancock Park, Los Angeles and in Lake Arrowhead, California.

== Death and legacy ==
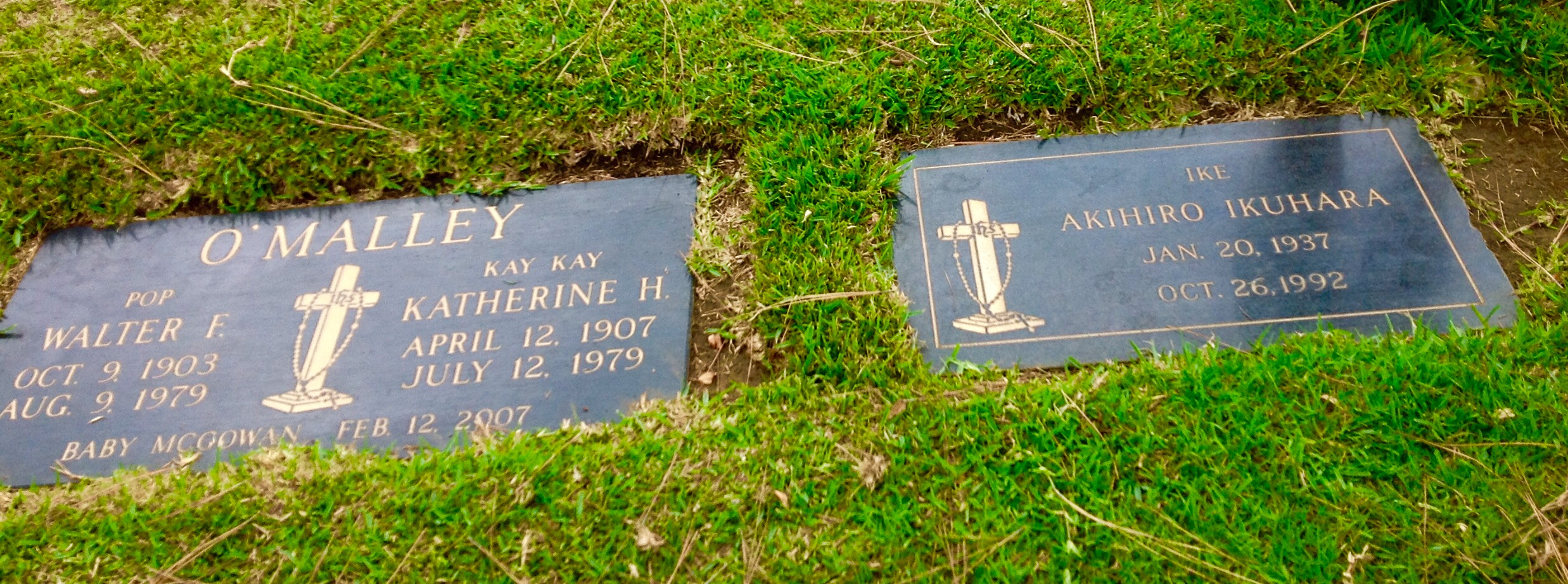
Grave of Walter O'Malley at Holy Cross Cemetery in Culver City.

O'Malley was diagnosed with cancer, and he sought treatment at the Mayo Clinic in Rochester, Minnesota. He died of congestive heart failure on August 9, 1979, at the Methodist Hospital in Rochester. O'Malley had never returned to Brooklyn before his death. He was buried at Holy Cross Cemetery in Culver City, California. His wife Kay had died a few weeks earlier.

Although O'Malley had later retired and had relinquished control of the Dodgers before his death, he remains hated in Brooklyn for moving the Dodgers to the West Coast. At one time, Brooklyn Dodgers fans hated O'Malley so much that he was routinely mentioned along with Adolf Hitler and Joseph Stalin as the most villainous 20th-century men; one version of a joke went, "If a Brooklyn man finds himself in a room with Hitler, Stalin, and O'Malley, but has only two bullets, what does he do? Shoot O'Malley twice." Some still consider him among the worst three men of the 20th century. Much of the animosity was not just for moving the team, but robbing Brooklyn of the sense of a cohesive cultural and social identity that a major sports franchise provides. Despite the long-standing animosity of Brooklyn fans and their supporters in baseball, O'Malley was posthumously inducted into the National Baseball Hall of Fame in 2008 after having been elected by the Veterans Committee with the minimum number of votes necessary for induction.

His legacy is that of changing the mindset of a league that had the St. Louis Cardinals as the National League's southernmost and westernmost team (the Philadelphia Athletics of the American League had moved further west to Kansas City just three years prior). Tommy Lasorda said upon hearing of his election to the Hall, "He's a pioneer. He made a tremendous change in the game, opening up the West Coast to Major League Baseball." When asked how he wanted to be remembered, O'Malley said, "for planting a tree." The tree provided the branches to open up the West Coast to baseball, but O'Malley's son remembers his father's 28 years on Major League Baseball's executive council as service that "was instrumental in the early stages of the game's international growth." His contributions to baseball were widely recognized even before his Hall of Fame election: he was ranked 8th and 11th respectively by ABC Sports and The Sporting News in their lists of the most influential sports figures of the 20th century.

On July 7, 2009, Walter O'Malley was inducted into the Irish American Baseball Hall of Fame along with two other Dodger icons: slugger Steve Garvey and announcer Vin Scully. "Over the years, we have learned more of his decade-long quest to build a new stadium in Brooklyn and about how those efforts were thwarted by city officials. Perhaps this induction will inspire fans who themselves started new lives outside the borough to reconsider their thoughts about Walter O'Malley", said John Mooney, curator of the Irish American Baseball Hall of Fame. "He privately built one of baseball's more beautiful ballparks, Dodger Stadium, and set attendance records annually. While New York is the home of the Irish American Baseball Hall of Fame, it seeks to honor inductees whose impact was and is national."

On August 10, 2024, O'Malley's name was added to the Dodgers' Ring of Honor, alongside the franchise's retired numbers and microphones.

== Popular culture ==
O'Malley was mentioned several times in Danny Kaye's 1962 song tribute "D-O-D-G-E-R-S (Oh, Really? No, O'Malley!)", which spins a tale of a fantasy game between the Dodgers and the Giants. At one point, the umpire's call goes against the home team:

Down in the dugout, Alston glowers
Up in the booth, Vin Scully frowns;
Out in the stands, O'Malley grins...
Attendance 50,000!
So ....what does O'Malley do? CHARGE!!

O'Malley was featured prominently in the HBO documentary film Brooklyn Dodgers: Ghosts of Flatbush, which chronicled his executive management of the Brooklyn/Los Angeles Dodgers. The documentary focuses on the post World War II glory years of the franchise and presents a compelling case that O'Malley truly wanted to keep the Dodgers in Brooklyn in a stadium near the Long Island Rail Road's Atlantic Terminal, but he was unable to get the proper support from urban planner Robert Moses.

Business positions
| Preceded by Branch Rickey | President of the Brooklyn/Los Angeles Dodgers; 1950–1970 | Succeeded by Peter O'Malley |
| Preceded by Position established | Chairman of the Los Angeles Dodgers; 1970–1979 | Succeeded by Peter O'Malley |
