= Terry O'Malley Seidler =

American baseball owner and executive (1933–2025)

- Born: Therese O'Malley; May 16, 1933; New York City, U.S.
- Died: December 18, 2025 (aged 92); Pasadena, California, U.S.
- Education: College of New Rochelle (B.A.)
- Occupation: Baseball owner
- Spouse: Roland Seidler Jr. (m. 1958; died 2008)
- Children: 10, including John and Peter
- Parents: Walter O'Malley (father); Katherine "Kay" Hanson (mother)
- Relatives: Peter O'Malley (brother)

Therese O'Malley Seidler (May 16, 1933 – December 18, 2025) was an American baseball team owner and executive. She owned the Los Angeles Dodgers from 1979 to 1997, alongside her brother, Peter O'Malley. She was one of a few women to serve as the principal owner of a Major League Baseball team, inheriting half the team after the death of her father, Walter O'Malley. Later on, she became a part-owner of the San Diego Padres, alongside her children and brother.

== Early life ==
Born Therese "Terry" O'Malley in New York City on May 16, 1933, she was the eldest child of Katherine "Kay" (née Hanson) and Walter O'Malley. Her younger brother, Peter, was born in 1937. She spent her early life split between Amityville and Brooklyn.

O'Malley attended Froebel Academy and graduated from St. Francis Xavier Academy in Brooklyn. She enrolled at the College of New Rochelle where she played basketball and softball. Besides being elected class president as a freshman and Mission Queen as a senior, she also served as a member of the student council in 1953–1954. As a member of the Narrasketuck Yacht Club in Amityville, she took part in sailboat racing. Her hobbies also included ice skating and swimming.

== Career ==
Upon graduating from college, O'Malley served as executive secretary for three summers for the Dodgertown Summer Camp for Boys in Vero Beach, Florida. When the Dodgers moved to Los Angeles, O'Malley moved to California with her family. She worked as her father's personal secretary.

After marrying Roland Seidler, O'Malley Seidler devoted herself to her family. In 1978, she returned to the Dodgers executive office and served on their board of directors. She and Peter O'Malley, who had been serving as president of the team for a few years, inherited the team outright upon the death of their father in 1979. In 1981, Seidler was named corporate secretary of the Dodgers' board of directors, a role she remained through 1998, when the O'Malleys sold the team to Rupert Murdoch's News Corp.

In 2012, on the 50th anniversary of the opening of Dodger Stadium, Seidler threw out the ceremonial first pitch. Her mother Kay had thrown the ceremonial first pitch on the stadium's inaugural opening day on April 10, 1962. Through the efforts of her son Peter Seidler, she came to be part-owner of the San Diego Padres along with him, for a time.

=== Historic Dodgertown ===
In 2012, Seidler and O'Malley both joined efforts to buy Dodgertown, the Dodgers' spring training facility in Vero Beach, Florida, until they moved to Camelback Ranch in Arizona. The old facility was about to be torn down due to Indian River County's inability to find a willing tenant. The facility was turned into a year-round multi-sport training and conference center. Thanks to the efforts of the O'Malleys, Historic Dodgertown became a Florida Heritage Landmark on November 10, 2014.

== Personal life and death ==
Seidler married Los Angeles native and businessman Roland "Rollie" Seidler in October 1958. They had met earlier that year, during a doubleheader between the Dodgers and the Philadelphia Phillies at the Los Angeles Coliseum on May 4. The couple remained married until his death in June 2008 at their home in Pasadena, California. They had ten children together, including John and Peter Seidler. Peter was the principal owner and chairman of the San Diego Padres until his death in 2023, and John succeeded him as chairman in February 2025.

Seidler worked as a Sunday school teacher until a very old age. She died on December 18, 2025, at the age of 92.

== See also ==
- Women in baseball
- List of female Major League Baseball principal owners
