= Ron Fowler =

American businessman

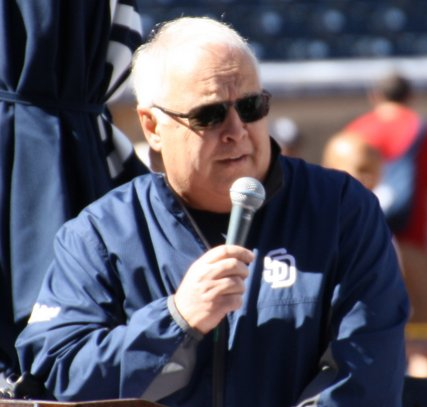
- Fowler in 2014
- Born: July 23, 1944 (age 82); Minneapolis, Minnesota, U.S.
- Education: University of St. Thomas (BBA, 1966); University of Minnesota (MBA)
- Occupations: Chairman and CEO of Liquid Investments, Inc. Chairman of Lincoln City F.C. Former control person, executive chairman and co-owner of the San Diego Padres
- Spouse: Alexis Fowler
- Children: 5

Ron Fowler (born July 23, 1944) is an American businessman. He is chairman and CEO of Liquid Investments Inc. and chairman of Lincoln City F.C.. He was an owner, executive chair and the MLB control person of the San Diego Padres of Major League Baseball from 2012 to 2020.

== Early life ==
Fowler was born to Loren W. and Leona (Mohs) Fowler on July 23, 1944, in Minneapolis, Minnesota, the oldest of two children. Fowler's father served in the U.S. Navy during World War II, stationed in New Guinea. Fowler was raised as Catholic, attending St. Cloud Cathedral High School where he played baseball.

== Liquid Investments ==
Fowler is the chairman and CEO of privately held Liquid Investments Inc., the parent company of former operating entities in California and Colorado. The investment group distributed Miller, Coors, Heineken, and other beer brands; and had annual sales exceeding $300 million.

== San Diego Padres ==
Fowler was a member of a minority group that owned 49.32 percent of the Padres. The group, headed by then-Padres chief executive Jeff Moorad, attempted to buy the Padres from controlling owner John Moores for $530 million, but the deal fell through in April 2012. Fowler then replaced Moorad as the general partner of the minority group, and he served on the Padres executive committee.

Fowler joined a new group to purchase the Padres that included four heirs to the O’Malley family—who owned the Los Angeles Dodgers franchise for five decades. Kevin and Brian O'Malley are the sons of former Dodgers owner Peter O'Malley and grandsons of Walter O'Malley, the owner who moved the Dodgers west from Brooklyn after the 1957 season. Peter and Tom Seidler are the nephews of Peter O’Malley. MLB approved the $800 million sale, which completed on August 28, 2012. As much as $200 million of the sale price included the team's 20-percent stake in Fox Sports San Diego, a cable channel that pays the Padres annual fees as part of a $1.2 billion, 20-year agreement. Fowler was named the ownership group's executive chairman and was designated to represent the Padres in all league meetings. He became the first locally based control person of the team since founding owner C. Arnholt Smith. Under the Fowler/Seidler/O'Malley group, the Padres have signed 3 players to contracts that beat the previous franchise record contract, giving 6 years and $83 million to Wil Myers in January 2017, 8 years and $144 million to Eric Hosmer in February 2018, and 10 years and $300 million to Manny Machado in February 2019.

On November 18, 2020, MLB approved Fowler transferring the role of chairman to Peter Seidler, who purchased a stake in the team from Fowler to become the largest stakeholder. Fowler remained with the team as vice chairman until 2022.

== Lincoln City ==
On April 24, 2024, Ron and his son Andrew invested in EFL League One football club Lincoln City through their Liquid Investments, Inc, purchasing a 12.6% stake in Lincoln City Holdings. Following a board meeting on December 11, 2025, Liquid Investments, Inc increased their shares to above 25% which would see them become the controlling shareholder of the club and see Ron become the clubs chairman. On January 26, the EFL issued clearance for the change of control process which saw Liquid Investments Inc. increase their shareholding in the Imps and Fowler become chairman, replacing the outgoing Clive Nates on February 4, 2026.

== Other interests ==
Fowler owned the San Diego Sockers, an indoor soccer team that won 10 championships in 11 years. He also chaired San Diego's first task force that selected a site for what was eventually Petco Park, and he chaired the host committee for Super Bowl XXXVII, held in Qualcomm Stadium in 2003.

== Philanthropy ==
Fowler and his wife Alexis have made major contributions to San Diego State University. The school's College of Business was renamed the Fowler College of Business in 2016 in response to the couple's $25 million contribution to the business school. An earlier challenge donation that raised $10 million for the athletics center resulted in its being named the Fowler Athletic Center. The Fowler family has also made 8 figure donations to the University of St. Thomas, Ron's alma mater, and University of San Diego in support of athletics and academic programs.
