= Rawlings (company) =

American sports equipment company

Rawlings Sporting Goods
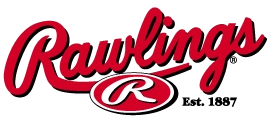
- Type: Subsidiary
- Industry: Sports equipment, textile
- Founded: 1887; 139 years ago in St. Louis, Missouri, US
- Founder: George and Alfred Rawlings
- Headquarters: St. Louis, Missouri, US
- Products: Baseball clothing and equipment, footwear, accessories
- Number of employees: 1,500 globally (200 in St. Louis)
- Parent: Seidler Equity Partners; MLB Properties
- Website: rawlings.com

Rawlings Sporting Goods is an American sports equipment manufacturing company based in Maryland Heights, Missouri. Founded in 1887, Rawlings currently specializes in baseball and softball clothing and equipment, producing gloves, bats, balls, protective gear, batting helmets, uniforms, bags. Footwear includes sneakers, and sandals. The company also sells other accessories such as belts, wallets, and sunglasses. Former products manufactured by Rawlings included American football, basketball, soccer, and volleyball balls.

The Rawlings company was acquired by Seidler Equity Partners (SEP) and MLB Properties from Newell Brands in June 2018 for $395 million.

== History ==
=== Origins ===
Rawlings was founded in St. Louis in 1887, during the middle of the Long Depression, by George and Alfred Rawlings. The brothers set up a sporting goods store with its own catalog. They sold "Fishing Tackle, Guns, Baseball, Football, Golf, Polo, Tennis, Athletic and General Sporting Goods". The company is credited with introducing football shoulder pads in 1902, and the first all-weather football.

The Horween Leather Company has provided Rawlings with leather since 1929. In 2003, Horween was providing leather for 3,000 Rawlings baseball gloves annually, and half of professional baseball players were using baseball gloves made from Horween leather.

In 2003, K2 Inc. acquired Rawlings. In 2005 Rawlings corporate headquarters were moved from Fenton, Missouri, to Town and Country, Missouri. In 2007, Jarden acquired K2 Inc. On December 14, 2015, Newell Rubbermaid announced that it would acquire Jarden for over $15 billion of cash and stock. The combined company was renamed Newell Brands.

It was announced on June 5, 2018, that Rawlings was sold from Newell Brands to the Los Angeles-based private equity firm, Seidler Equity Partners (SEP), run by San Diego Padres owner Peter Seidler, with MLB a co-investor in the $395 million deal. Rawlings employs 150 people in the St. Louis area, and 1,200 globally. The deal was completed on July 2, 2018. Rawlings previously made some custom baseball gloves at its plant in Washington, Missouri, and still makes many baseball gloves in the United States, with the factory still open.

=== Baseball ===
==== Major League Baseball ====
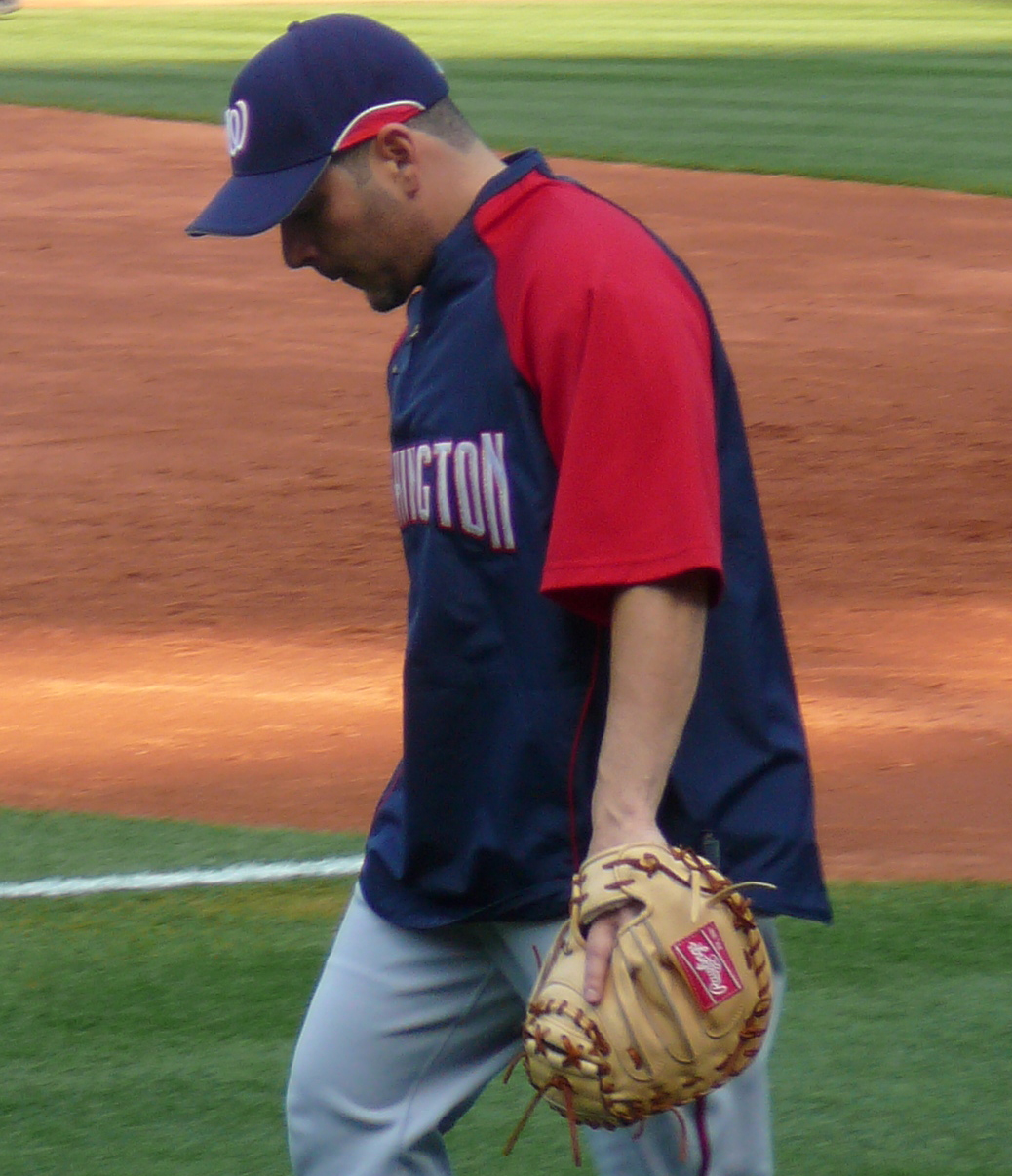
Paul Lo Duca, a Washington Nationals player, wearing a Rawlings catcher mitt

Rawlings began providing the hometown St. Louis Cardinals with gloves in 1906. In 1920, Bill Doak, a pitcher for the St. Louis Cardinals, suggested that a web be placed between the first finger and the thumb in order to create a pocket. This design soon became the standard for baseball gloves. Doak patented his design and sold it to Rawlings. His design became the precursor to modern gloves, and enabled Rawlings to become the preferred glove of professional players.

In 1955, Spalding bought Rawlings, and began using it to manufacture baseballs. In 1957, the company introduced the Gold Glove award, which became the major award for fielding in baseball. It also sponsors the Minor League Baseball (MiLB) "Rawlings Woman Executive of the Year" award. Thirteen years after acquiring it, an antitrust investigation forced Spalding to sell Rawlings again, but as it did so Spalding set up a contract that would have Rawlings manufacture baseballs to sell with the Spalding logo.

When this agreement ended in 1977, Rawlings began using its own logo, becoming the official supplier of the major leagues (producing separate balls for both the American and National Leagues from 1977 to 1999, and since 2000, a single ball for all of Major League Baseball), succeeding Spalding, which had been the supplier for a century. All the balls supplied to MLB teams are manufactured in Costa Rica. Many major leaguers have endorsed Rawlings equipment over the years. There are five main series for the gloves: the Gold Glove Series, the Heritage Pro Series, the Heart of the Hide Series, the Pro Preferred Series, and the Gold Glove Collection Series.

As of 2013, Rawlings baseball gloves were the most often-chosen gloves of current MLB players.

=== Other sports ===
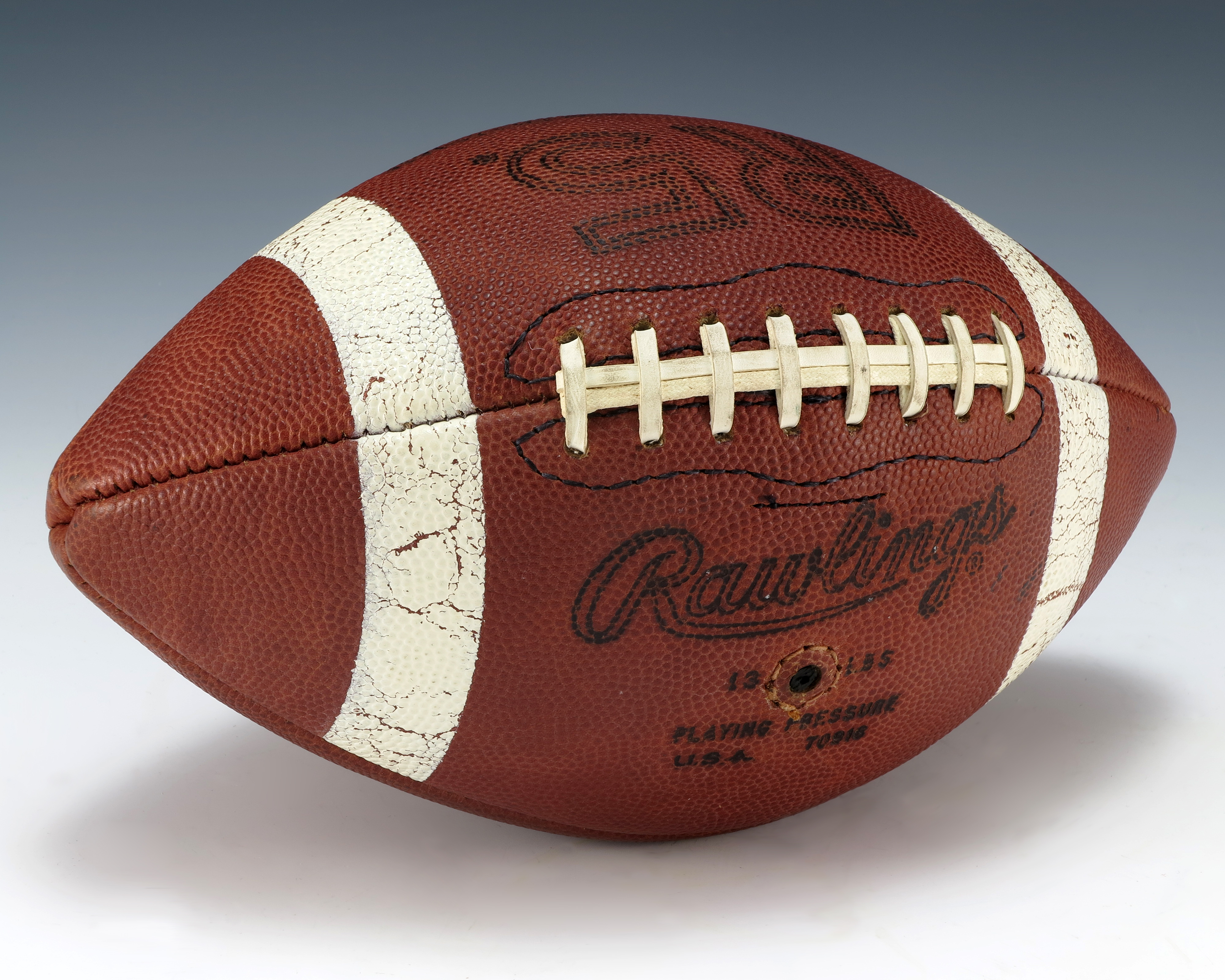
A Rawlings football used in the 1978 Rose Bowl

Former products manufactured by Rawlings included American football, basketball, soccer, and volleyball balls, as well as golf clubs.

==== National Football League ====
As of August 19, 2010, Rawlings signed a multi-year deal with the National Football League for products such as tent canopies, grills, and chairs. This will also include non-exclusive tailgate products such as coolers, stadium seats, and footballs.

== Sponsorships ==
=== NCAA baseball ===
Rawlings currently sponsors over 50 collegiate baseball teams in the NCAA Division 1 Level. Some of the more notable schools include UCLA, Arkansas, Ole Miss, and TCU. Schools sponsored by Rawlings get access to their high performance equipment, uniforms, and apparel. Teams sponsored also get access to prestigious Rawlings awards like the ABCA/Rawlings Gold Glove Awards.

=== American Legion Baseball ===
Rawlings sponsors the Rawlings Big Stick Award, which is presented to the American Legion Baseball "player who accumulated the most total bases."
