= Samuel Buchler =

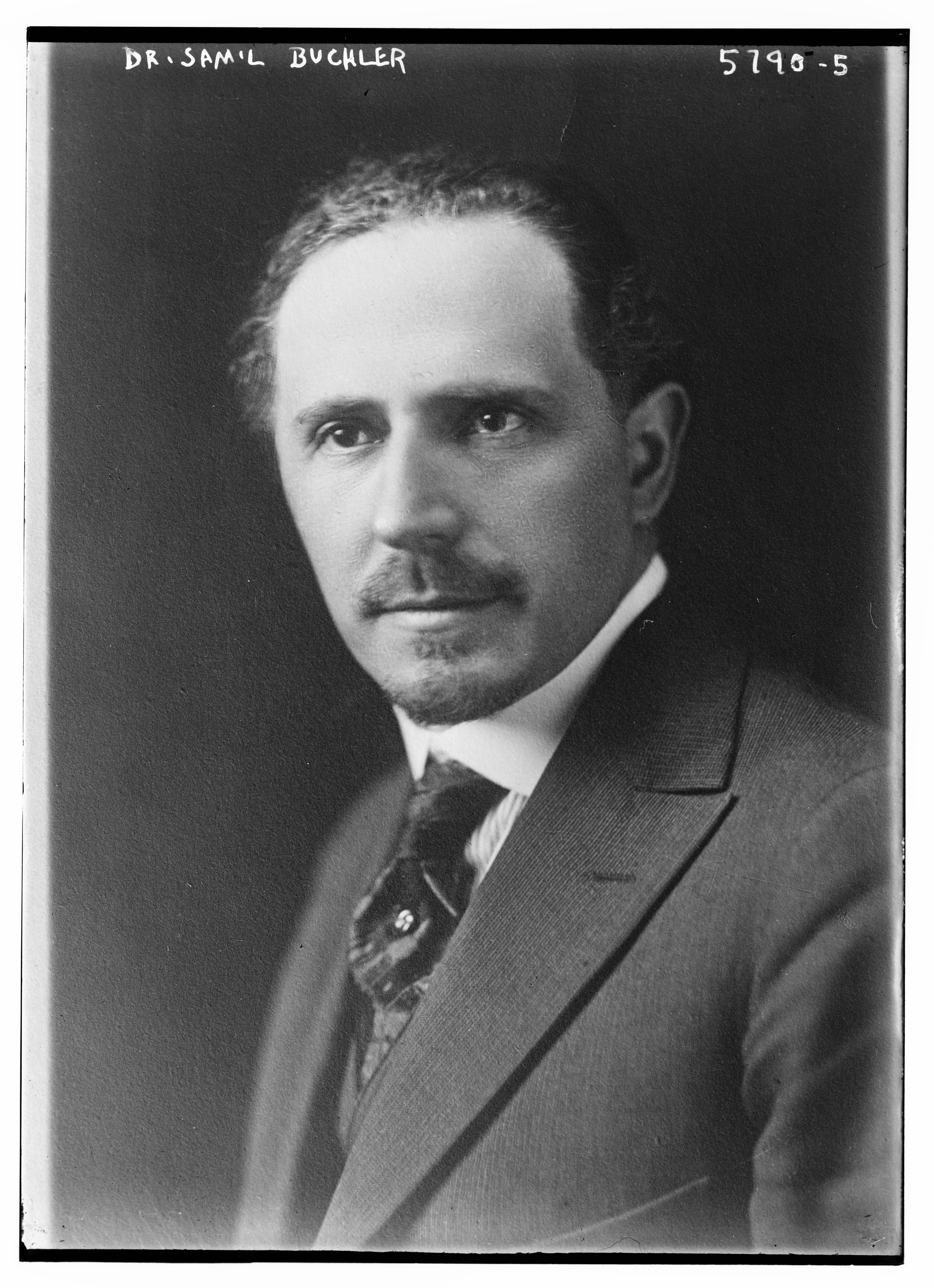
Dr. Sam'l (i.e. Samuel) Buchler LCCN2014714774

Rabbi Samuel Buchler (March 21, 1882 – April 1971), was the President of the Federation of Hungarian Jews in America, in 1909 in New York. He was the Deputy Commissioner of Public Markets for New York City in 1919. He was also a lawyer and Jewish chaplain at Sing Sing prison. He was charged with grand larceny in 1932 and was disbarred. He purportedly took money from clients to aid in immigration, but didn't do any work and pocketed the money. He died in Brooklyn in 1971.

== Publications ==
- Cohen comes first and other cases: stories of controversies before the New York Jewish Court of Arbitration. New York: Vanguard Press, 1933.
