= Commissioner of Public Markets =

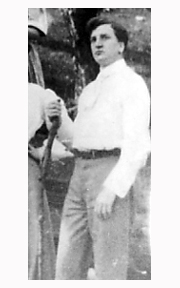
Edwin Joseph O'Malley (1883–1955), c. 1905

The Commissioner of Public Markets, Weights, and Measures of the City of New York was a cabinet-level post appointed by the mayor of New York City during World War I, when foodstuffs were in short supply and people began hoarding. The goal was to "set fair prices for meat and fish." The commissioner had jurisdiction over all public markets, market places, and all auctioneers. The office started after World War I and in 1968, the Department of Markets (as it was by then known) was merged with the Department of Licenses by (Markets) Commissioner Gerard M. Weisberg to become the Department of Consumer Affairs.

== Commissioners ==
- Henry Moskowitz, c. 1917.
- Jonathan C. Day, c. 1918. fired by mayor John F. Hylan
- William P. Mulry, 1919 as Acting Commissioner under mayor John F. Hylan.
- Edwin Joseph O'Malley, c. 1919-1927 for 7 years under mayor John F. Hylan and survived a graft investigation.
- Thomas F. Dwyer, c. 1930 to 1932. He concluded that direct rail delivery of food to the Bronx Terminal Market could have saved consumers millions of dollars
- Jere F. Ryan, 1932 to 1933
- J. Bonynge, c. 1934
- William Fellowes Morgan, Jr., c. 1935 to 1939
- Daniel P. Wooley, c. 1943–1944.
- Eugene G. Schulz, c. 1949.
- Albert S. Pacetta, c. 1965.
- Samuel J. Kearing, Jr., 1966.
- Gerard Maxwell Weisberg, 1966 to 1968.

== Deputy commissioners ==
- William P. Mulry, 1919
- Edwin Joseph O'Malley, 1919
- Samuel Buchler, November 1919
- Mrs. John Marshall Gallagher, c. 1922
- Mrs. Louis R. Welzmiller, c. 1922
- John Joseph Delaney, 1924 to 1931
- Michael Fiaschetti, 1931 to 1937
- Alex Pisciotta, 1937
