= John Moores (baseball) =

American entrepreneur and philanthropist

John Jay Moores
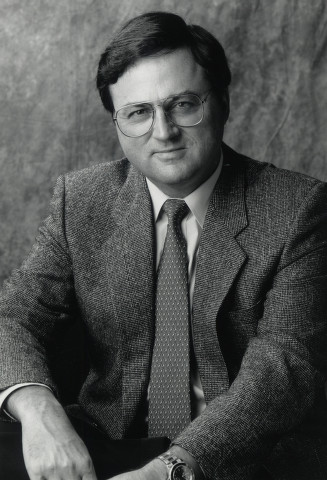
- Moores in the early 1990s
- Born: July 9, 1944 (age 82); San Antonio, Texas, U.S.
- Education: B.S. Economics (1970); J.D. (1975); Honorary (1995)
- Alma mater: University of Houston
- Occupations: Entrepreneur, former San Diego Padres owner.
- Board member of: University of Houston System regent (1991–1994); The Carter Center chairman, trustee (1994–present); University of California chairman, regent (1999–2007)
- Spouses: Rebecca Baas (m. 1963; div. 2008); Dianne Rosenberg (m. 2013)
- Children: Four

John Jay Moores (born July 9, 1944, in San Antonio, Texas, as John Jay Broderick) is an American entrepreneur and philanthropist, and the former owner of the San Diego Padres of Major League Baseball (MLB).

== Early life ==
Moores was born in San Antonio, Texas—the eldest son of Jack and Katherine Broderick. Jack Broderick abandoned his wife, son John, and two younger sons in 1948. In 1950, Katherine wed again, to Cyrus "Red" Moores, a photographer with the Corpus Christi Caller newspaper, and her sons were given their stepfather's name. Red Moores, by then in insurance, moved the family to Houston, Texas, in 1960, and John spent his high school years there. He left Texas A&M University before graduating and became a programmer for IBM. He later studied at the University of Houston where he earned his Bachelor of Science degree in economics and a Juris Doctor from the University of Houston Law Center.

== Career ==
=== Business ===
He founded BMC Software in Texas in 1980, and was the lead venture capital financier for Peregrine Systems in California starting in 1981, as well as ServiceNow, another California corporation founded in 2005. He served as a director of Peregrine from March 1989 to March 2003 and as chairman of the board from March 1990 through July 2000 and from May 2002 through March 2003, during which he cashed out between US$600 and US$630 million in Peregrine stock. He resigned as Peregrine chairman in February 2003 as part of the company's Chapter 11 reorganization. He also founded JMI Equity. In 1994, Moores purchased the San Diego Padres professional baseball team from Tom Werner. In 2009, he began the process of incrementally selling the Padres to a group of twelve investors, headed by Jeff Moorad (former sports agent and CEO of the Arizona Diamondbacks) for about $500 million. The deal fell through in 2012, and Moores instead sold the team for $800 million to a group led by Ron Fowler. Moores was voted into the Padres Hall of Fame in 2023.

He continues to operate in the IT service management market with continued investments through his venture capital firm JMI Equity.

=== Philanthropy and activism ===
Organizations that Moores has supported include the ACLU, the San Diego Zoo, San Diego State University, the San Diego Symphony, San Diego Center for Children, the Boys and Girls Clubs, St. Vincent de Paul Villages, the National Multiple Sclerosis Society and Scripps Research, where Moores sits on the board.

His 1991 contribution of US$51 million to the University of Houston was the largest in U.S. history to a public university. He served on the University of Houston System Board of Regents from 1991 to 1994. Among many other philanthropic efforts, John and Becky Moores donated US$21 million to establish the John and Rebecca Moores Cancer Center at the University of California, San Diego, and over US$20 million to San Diego State University. In 1999, he was appointed Regent of the University of California by Governor Gray Davis until he resigned for unknown reasons in 2007. As UC regent, he worked to make sure Proposition 209 (passed in 1996) was implemented. In 2005, he was elected chair of the Carter Center at Emory University, succeeding Jimmy Carter. Most recently, Moores is a member of the board of trustees for the Blum Center for Developing Economies at the University of California, Berkeley. The center is focused on finding solutions to address the crisis of extreme poverty and disease in the developing world.

Moores is also the founder of the River Blindness Foundation, a non-profit organisation dedicated to research and treatment of Onchocerciasis, the second most common cause of infectious blindness.

In 2016, Moores began negotiations to buy English soccer club Nottingham Forest, with a view to buying between 80% and 100% of the shares from Kuwaiti owner Fawaz Al-Hasawi for a reported $61.87 million. However, the deal unexpectedly collapsed at the eleventh hour, with no clear reason given by either party.

== Personal life ==
In February 2008, Moores' wife Becky filed for divorce, citing irreconcilable differences. Moores gave up ownership of the family home on a golf course at Pebble Beach, California. The property overlooked the Pacific and the 18th fairway of the golf course. The divorce also prompted a major overhaul of the San Diego Padres roster, followed by the sale of Moores's majority ownership of the Major League Baseball team. During the divorce proceedings, Moores spent the majority of his time in Texas, and refused to attend Padres and San Diego State games, while his wife regularly attended Padres games. In 2013, Moores married Dianne Rosenberg.

== Honors and awards ==
- 1996: Donor of the Year by the National Association of Athletic Development Directors
- 1997: San Diego Jackie Robinson YMCA Human Dignity Award

== See also ==
- Moores School of Music
