= Outline of San Diego =

City in Southern California, United States

The following outline is provided as an overview of and topical guide to San Diego:

San Diego (/ˌsæn diˈeɪɡoʊ/ SAN dee-AY-goh; Spanish: [san ˈdjeɣo]) is a city on the Pacific coast of Southern California, adjacent to the Mexico–United States border. It is the eighth-most populous city in the U.S. and second-most populous city in California with a population of over 1.4 million, while the San Diego metropolitan area with over 3.3 million residents is the 18th-largest metropolitan area in the country. San Diego is the county seat of San Diego County. It is known for its mild Mediterranean climate, extensive beaches and parks, long association with the United States Navy, and recent emergence as a wireless, electronics, healthcare, and biotechnology development center.

== General reference ==
- Pronunciation: /ˌsæn diˈeɪɡoʊ/
- Common English name(s): San Diego
- Official English name(s): City of San Diego
- Nicknames of San Diego
  - "America's Finest City"
  - "Birthplace of California"
  - "City in Motion"
- Adjectival(s): San Diegan
- Demonym(s): San Diegan

== Geography of San Diego ==
Geography of San Diego

- San Diego is: a city
- Population of San Diego: 1,386,932 (2020 census)
- Area of San Diego: 372.4 square miles (964 km2)
- Atlas of San Diego

=== Location of San Diego ===
San Diego is situated within the following regions:

- Northern Hemisphere and Western Hemisphere
  - North America (outline)
    - Northern America
      - United States (outline)
        - Western United States
          - Pacific States
            - West Coast of the United States
              - California
                - Southern California
                  - San Diego County
      - San Diego–Tijuana international metropolitan conurbation
- Time zone(s): Pacific Time Zone (UTC-8/-7)

=== Environment of San Diego ===
- Climate of San Diego

=== Landforms of San Diego ===
- Beaches in San Diego County
- San Diego Bay
- Mission Bay
- Point Loma
- Mount Soledad
- San Diego River

=== Areas of San Diego ===
==== Districts of San Diego ====
- City Heights, San Diego
- Downtown San Diego
- Mission Valley
- Old Town
- Port of San Diego
  - Embarcadero
- South San Diego
- Southeast San Diego

==== Neighborhoods in San Diego ====
- Communities and neighborhoods of San Diego

=== Locations in San Diego ===
- Balboa Park
- San Diego Convention Center
- Naval Air Station North Island
- Naval Base San Diego
- SeaWorld San Diego
  - Manta rollercoaster
- Sesame Place San Diego
- San Diego Zoo

==== Parks and gardens in San Diego ====
Parks and gardens in San Diego

- Parks in San Diego
- San Diego Zoo
- SeaWorld San Diego

==== Historic locations in San Diego ====
- Old Town San Diego State Historic Park
- Cabrillo National Monument
- Mission Basilica San Diego de Alcalá
- Presidio of San Diego
- USS Midway Museum

=== Demographics of San Diego ===
Demographics of San Diego

- Ethnic groups in San Diego
  - Hispanics and Latinos in San Diego

== Government and politics of San Diego ==
Government and politics of San Diego

- Elections of San Diego
  - 2024 San Diego elections
    - 2024 San Diego mayoral election
- Government of San Diego
  - Mayors of San Diego
  - San Diego City Council
- Homelessness in San Diego
- Law enforcement in San Diego
  - San Diego Police Department
  - Crime in San Diego
- San Diego Fire-Rescue Department

== History of San Diego ==
History of San Diego

- Timeline of San Diego

=== History of San Diego, by period or event ===
Timeline of San Diego

- Spanish period of San Diego
- Mexican period of San Diego
- American period of San Diego
  - 1858 San Diego hurricane
  - 1995 San Diego tank rampage

=== History of San Diego, by subject ===
- Cleveland Elementary School shooting (San Diego) (1979)
- East San Diego
- San Diego Electric Railway
- History of San Diego State University
- History of the San Diego Padres
- History of the San Diego Chargers
- Mission San Diego de Alcalá
- Murder of Danielle van Dam
- Pacific Southwest Airlines Flight 182
- Plan of San Diego
- San Diego serial murders
- San Diego pension scandal

== Culture of San Diego ==
Culture of San Diego

- Architecture of San Diego
  - Tallest building in San Diego
- Media in San Diego
- Museums in San Diego
- People from San Diego
- Symbols of San Diego
  - Flag of San Diego

=== Art in San Diego ===
- Fiction set in San Diego
- San Diego Museum of Art

==== Cinema of San Diego ====
Cinema of San Diego

- San Diego Comic-Con
- San Diego International Film Festival
- San Diego Film Commission
- San Diego Film Critics Society

==== Music of San Diego ====
Music of San Diego

- San Diego Symphony
- San Diego Opera
- SOMA San Diego

=== Religion in San Diego ===
- Cemeteries in San Diego
- Christianity in San Diego
  - Episcopal Diocese of San Diego
  - Roman Catholic Diocese of San Diego
  - Church of the Latter Day Saints in San Diego
    - San Diego California Temple
- Rock Church (San Diego)

=== Sports in San Diego ===
Sports in San Diego

- Baseball in San Diego
  - San Diego Padres
    - San Diego Padres minor league players
    - History of the San Diego Padres
  - Baseball parks in San Diego
  - San Diego Toreros baseball
  - UC San Diego Tritons baseball
- Basketball in San Diego
  - San Diego State Aztecs men's basketball
  - San Diego Toreros men's basketball
  - UC San Diego Tritons men's basketball
- Collegiate sports in San Diego
  - San Diego State Aztecs
  - San Diego Toreros (University of San Diego)
  - UC San Diego Tritons
- Football (gridiron) in San Diego
  - San Diego State Aztecs football
  - San Diego Toreros football
- Football (soccer) in San Diego
  - Albion San Diego
  - San Diego FC
    - 2025 San Diego FC season
  - San Diego Wave FC (National Women's Soccer League)
  - San Diego Sockers (2009)
- Golf in San Diego
  - The Sentry
- Ice hockey in San Diego
  - San Diego Gulls
- Lacrosse in San Diego
  - San Diego Seals (National Lacrosse League)
- Rugby in San Diego
  - Rugby Union in San Diego
    - San Diego Legion
- Running in San Diego
  - San Diego Marathon
- Sports venues in San Diego
  - Pechanga Arena
  - San Diego Stadium
  - San Diego Velodrome
- Tennis in San Diego
  - San Diego Open
- Volleyball in San Diego
  - San Diego Mojo (women's team)
- Other
  - San Diego Chicken

== Economy and infrastructure of San Diego ==
Economy of San Diego

- List of tallest buildings in San Diego
- Communications in San Diego
  - Media in San Diego
    - San Diego Daily Transcript
    - The San Diego Union-Tribune
    - KFMB-TV
- Companies in San Diego
  - List of companies headquartered in San Diego
  - San Diego Convention Center
- Healthcare in San Diego
  - Hospitals in San Diego
- Homelessness in San Diego
- Public services in San Diego
  - San Diego Fire Department
    - Fireboats of San Diego
  - San Diego Police Department
  - San Diego Public Library
- Public utilities in San Diego
  - San Diego Aqueduct
  - San Diego Gas & Electric
- Tourism in San Diego

=== Transportation in San Diego ===
Transport in San Diego

- San Diego Metropolitan Transit System
- Air transport in San Diego
  - Airports in the San Diego area
    - San Diego International Airport
- Rail transport in San Diego
  - San Diego Trolley
- Road transport in San Diego
  - San Diego–Coronado Bridge
  - San Diego freeways
    - San Diego Freeway
- Maritime transport in San Diego
  - Port of San Diego

== Education in San Diego ==
Education in San Diego

- List of primary and secondary schools in San Diego
- Secondary education in San Diego
  - San Diego Unified School District
- Institutions of higher education in San Diego
  - Community colleges in San Diego
    - San Diego Community College District
      - San Diego City College
      - San Diego Mesa College
      - San Diego Miramar College
      - San Diego College of Continuing Education
  - Universities in San Diego
    - University of San Diego
      - University of San Diego School of Law
    - San Diego State University
      - History of San Diego State University
      - List of San Diego State University people
    - University of California, San Diego
      - UC San Diego Health
        - UC San Diego School of Medicine
      - List of University of California, San Diego people
      - San Diego Supercomputer Center
    - Point Loma Nazarene University
    - San Diego Christian College

== See also ==
- Outline of geography
- Marine Corps Recruit Depot San Diego
- San Diego Zoo Wildlife Alliance
- San Diego Humane Society
