= William N. Hebert =

American attorney (born 1960)

William N. Hebert (born 1960 Iowa City, Iowa) is an American attorney who served as the 86th President of the State Bar of California. Herbert played an important role in reforms of the State Bar.

== State Bar President ==
During Hebert's term as State Bar President, in addition to serving as chair of the Board of Governors, he served as Chair of the State Bar's Governance in the Public Interest Task Force. In May 2011 this Task Force submitted a report that recommended changes to the governance structure of the State Bar.

As a result of the Task Force's report, the state passed laws were passed that changed the Bar's governance and its mission statement. These changes included: reducing the size of the Board from 23 to 19 members and changing the way that the lawyer members of the board members are selected to serve on the Board. Under the new selection process, five members are appointed by the California Supreme Court after undergoing a merit screening process, six members are elected from the six judicial appellate districts, and two member are appointed by the California legislature. The changes also included allowing lawyer members appointed by the Supreme Court to be re-appointed for one additional term; and providing that protection of the public was the highest priority of the Bar in exercising its licensing, regulatory and disciplinary functions.

In recognition for his work at the State Bar, Hebert was selected by the San Francisco Daily Journal – San Francisco Legal News as one of California's Top 100 lawyers of 2011.

Hebert is a partner with the law firm of Calvo Fisher & Jacob LLP in its San Francisco office. He currently serves as the Chair-Elect of the Board of Trustees of Prospect Sierra School and as a member of the Board of Directors of the San Francisco Legal Aid Society-Employment Law Center and the Public Interest Law Project.

Hebert received his A.B. from Stanford University in 1983 and his J.D. from Boalt Hall School of Law, University of California at Berkeley, in 1988.
