= San Diego shooting =

San Diego shooting may refer to:

- Cleveland Elementary School shooting, which occurred at Grover Cleveland Elementary School in 1979
- San Ysidro McDonald's massacre, which occurred in the San Ysidro neighborhood of San Diego in 1984
- San Diego State University shooting, which occurred at San Diego State University in 1996
- Islamic Center of San Diego shooting, which occurred in the Clairemont Mesa neighborhood of San Diego in 2026
