= Lorraine C. Friedman =

Jonas Salk's personal assistant

Lorraine Cecilia Friedman (August 1, 1918–December 2, 2005) was the personal assistant to medical researcher Jonas Salk, who developed the first widely used polio vaccine. She began working with Salk at the Virus Research Laboratory at the University of Pittsburgh in 1949 and remained his personal assistant for 40 years.

Friedman efficiently managed all the administrative operations of the Virus Research Laboratory including Salk's calendar, appointments, and correspondence. She often acted as a mediator between junior staff and Salk. She was also protective of Salk's privacy and preference not to be in the media spotlight after the successful launch of the vaccine. In the early history of the Salk Institute for Biological Studies, Friedman was the only administrative staff supporting Salk and the organization.

Friedman meticulously maintained all the documents related to Salk's research, writing, and publications including the activities of the Virus Research Laboratory and the Salk Institute until her retirement.

== Personal life ==
Friedman was born to Hungarian Jewish immigrant parents in the eastern suburbs of Pittsburgh, Pennsylvania. She attended college and enlisted in the Navy during World War II. She was offered employment at the Virus Research Laboratory at the University of Pittsburgh after responding to want ad in the Pittsburgh Press.

Salk biographer Charlotte DeCroes Jacobs notes that Friedman's loyalty, support, and organization of his daily life went beyond what was typical of an employment relationship. However, while Friedman likely had intense feelings for Salk, he never saw her as more than an extremely capable executive secretary.

== Death ==
According to a brief notice published in the San Diego Union-Tribune on December 5, 2005, Friedman died at her home in La Jolla, California on December 2, 2005, and was buried in El Camino Memorial Park in San Diego, California.

== Bibliography ==
- Jacobs, Charlotte DeCroes (2015). Jonas Salk: A Life. Oxford University Press. ISBN 978-0199334414.
