= Clarence Joseph Paderewski =

American architect and civic leader (1908–2007)

- Born: 23 July 1908; Cleveland, Ohio, United States
- Died: 9 July 2007 (aged 98); San Diego, California, United States
- Known for: Designing the first exterior glass elevator
- Spouse: Cecilia May Boyer Maxine Fern Hood Genevieve Paderewski
- Children: 2
- Relatives: Ignacy Jan Paderewski(cousin)

Clarence Joseph Paderewski was an American architect, best known for being the designer of the Starlight Express, the world's first scenic elevator.

== Early life ==
Paderewski was born in Cleveland, Ohio in 1908 to Polish parents John and Barbara Paderewski. He could not speak English until he was six years old. In 1920 he moved with his parents to Los Angeles. He attended Franklin High School graduating in 1926. He then graduated from University of California, Los Angeles in 1932 with a Bachelors degree in architecture. He moved to San Diego in 1935.

== Career ==
He won 3rd prize in the National Design Competition of a Residence for Structural Clay Products in 1936. He thought drafting, architecture and related subjects in 1939 for San Diego Unified School District. He opened his first office in 1944. Along with Delmar S. Mitchell and Louis A. Dean he founded the very successful Paderewski, Mitchell and Dean AIA Architects firm. In 1956 Paderewski worked with Elevator Electric Inc. to design the Starlight Express, the world's first scenic elevator. This elevator lasted 44 years before the hotel was refurbished and it was removed. The other famous works of his include the Lindbergh Field Terminal at San Diego Airport and the Buckminster Fuller-esque geodesic dome on the Palomar College campus. He was regarded as San Diegos premier architect In 1962, he was elected to the American Institute of Architects College of Fellows. In 1982, he was invested in the "Order of Polonia Restituta" by the Polish Government in Exile, for his service to architecture and for a lifetime of service to Poles in the United States. When Paderewski was in his 80s he met with U.S. president George H. W. Bush and Polish president Lech Walesa to decide where his cousin, pianist legend Ignacy Jan Paderewski would be reburied. He recommended his coffin would be draped with just the Polish flag.

== Death ==
Paderewski passed away from national causes on July 9 2007 at the age of 98. He was survived by his wife Genevieve, his two daughters Colette and Coleen, two stepchildren Sharon and Paul, 10 grandchildren and 7 great grandchildren. He was buried in El Camino Memorial Park in San Diego.
