= History of the San Diego Padres =

The following is a franchise history of the San Diego Padres of Major League Baseball (MLB). Prior to joining Major League Baseball as one of four expansion teams in 1969, the San Diego Padres were a Minor League franchise in the Pacific Coast League.

== 1969–2000: 20th century ==
=== 1969–1983: Initial struggles ===
The Padres adopted their name from the Pacific Coast League team which arrived in San Diego in 1936. That minor league franchise won the PCL title in 1937, led by then-18-year-old San Diegan Ted Williams. Initially the team played at Lane Field located near San Diego Harbor prior to moving to Westgate Park, in Mission Valley, where Fashion Valley Mall is currently located, and finally moving to San Diego Stadium for the PCL squad's last season in 1968.

In 1969, the San Diego Padres joined the ranks of Major League Baseball as one of four new expansion teams, along with the Montreal Expos (now the Washington Nationals), the Kansas City Royals and the Seattle Pilots (now the Milwaukee Brewers). Their original owner was C. Arnholt Smith, a prominent San Diego businessman and former owner of the PCL Padres whose interests included banking, tuna fishing, hotels, real estate and an airline. Despite initial excitement, the guidance of longtime baseball executives Eddie Leishman, Doc Mattei, and Buzzie Bavasi, and a new playing field, the team struggled; the Padres finished in last place in each of their first 6 seasons in the NL West, losing 100 games or more 4 times. One of the few bright spots on the team during the early years was first baseman and slugger Nate Colbert, an expansion draftee from the Houston Astros and held the Padres' career team home run record for nearly 50 years.

=== Washington Stars / Nationals ===
Before the 1974 season began, the Padres were on the verge of being sold to Joseph Danzansky, who was planning to move the franchise to Washington, D.C., in time for the upcoming season. New uniforms were designed for the team, which was planning to be renamed to either the Washington Stars or the Washington Nationals. Given the uncertain status of the Padres, Topps printed two sets of baseball cards for the team, splitting production between one set with "San Diego" and "Padres" as banners, and another with "Washington" and "Nat'l Lea" (National League). However, the sale to Danzansky became tied up in lawsuits, and Smith instead sold the team to McDonald's co-founder Ray Kroc for $12 million. Kroc was well-financed and firmly committed to keeping the Padres in San Diego.

=== 1970s and early 1980s: Winfield, Jones, Fingers and Ozzie ===
San Diego Padres cap logo (1974–1984)

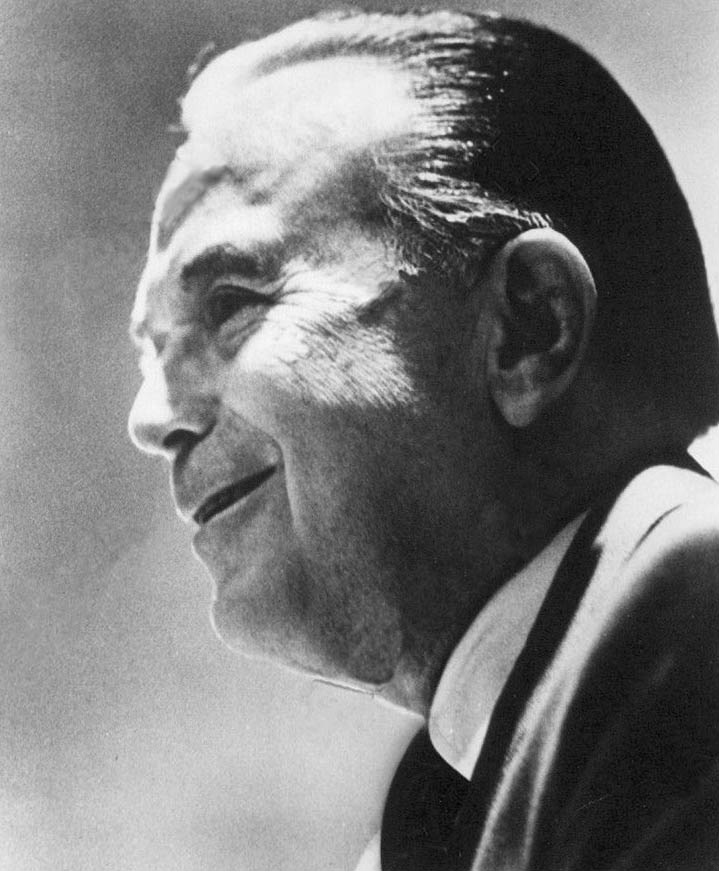
Ray Kroc owned the team from 1974 until his death in 1984.

In his first home game as the Padres' new owner in 1974, Ray Kroc grabbed the public address system microphone and apologized to fans for the poor performance of the team, saying, "I have never seen such stupid ballplaying in my life." At the same time, a streaker raced across the field, eluding security personnel. Kroc shouted, "Throw him in jail!" The following season, 1975, would be the first season that the Padres would not finish in the National League West cellar (finishing fourth), and brought the promise of an owner who would make the necessary changes to the organization.

Nate Colbert is one of two major-league baseball players (Stan Musial is the other) to have hit five home runs in a doubleheader, a feat he accomplished as a Padre. He collected 13 RBIs in that doubleheader, still a major league record. Although the Padres continued to struggle after Colbert's departure via trade to the Detroit Tigers in 1974, they did feature star outfielder Dave Winfield, who came to the Padres in 1973 from the University of Minnesota without having played a single game in the minor leagues. Winfield was also drafted by the Minnesota Vikings of the National Football League, the Atlanta Hawks of the National Basketball Association and the Utah Stars of the American Basketball Association.

Winfield took over where Colbert left off, starring in the Padres outfield from 1973 until 1980, when he joined the New York Yankees. In seven seasons, Winfield played in 1,117 games for San Diego and collected 1,134 hits, 154 home runs and drove in 626 runs. But most importantly, he helped the team out of the National League West basement for the first time in 1975, under the guidance of manager John McNamara, who took over the club at the start of the 1974 season.

Winfield's emergence as a legitimate star coincided with the turnaround of a promising young left-handed pitcher named Randy Jones, who had suffered through 22 losses in 1974. Jones became the first San Diego pitcher to win 20 games in 1975, going 20–12 in 37 outings as the Padres finished in fourth place with a 71–91 record, 37 games behind the Cincinnati Reds.

Jones won 22 games in 1976, winning the Cy Young Award in the process, another franchise first. The club set a new high with 73 wins, but fell to fifth place.

Jones slipped to 6–12 in 1977, and not even the acquisition of Rollie Fingers could help the Padres escape the bottom half of the division. Only Winfield and fellow outfielder George Hendrick cracked the 20-homer barrier, and the pitching staff was filled with a group of unknowns and youngsters, few of whom would enjoy much success at the major league level.

The 1978 season brought hope to baseball fans in San Diego, thanks to the arrival a young shortstop named Ozzie Smith, who arrived on the scene and turned the baseball world on its ears with an acrobatic style that redefined how the position should be played in the field. The Padres hosted the All-Star Game that summer. The National League won the contest 7–3 thanks to an MVP performance by Los Angeles Dodgers first baseman Steve Garvey, who would play a crucial role for San Diego in the not-too-distant future.

Winfield and Fingers represented the team at the game, but conspicuously absent was starting pitcher Gaylord Perry, who joined the Padres after spending three years with the Texas Rangers. At 39 years of age and coming off a 15–14 season with Texas, little was expected of him. All Perry did that summer was post a 21–6 record and a 2.73 earned run average, edging Montreal's Ross Grimsley to earn the Padres' second Cy Young Award in three seasons. San Diego also picked up another first that summer, compiling an 84–78 mark for manager Roger Craig, the only time in 10 seasons the team finished a season with a winning percentage above .500.

The good times did not last, as the Padres closed out the decade with another losing season in 1979, a 68–93 record that cost Craig his job. Winfield was the lone bright spot, leading the National League with 118 RBIs. The good times continued to fade out as Winfield signed a 10-year contract with the New York Yankees after the 1980 season.

=== 1984: A year like never before ===
The 1984 season began with a shock: Ray Kroc died of heart disease on January 14. Ownership of the team passed to his third wife, Joan Kroc. The team would wear Ray's initials, "RAK" on their jersey's left sleeve during the entire season, as well as the 1985 and 1986 seasons.

Fortunately, happier times were ahead for the team. The Padres finished at 92–70 in 1984 and won the National League West championship, despite having no players with 100-RBI and only two batters with 20-HR. They were managed by Dick Williams and had an offense that featured veterans Steve Garvey, Garry Templeton, Graig Nettles, Alan Wiggins as well as Hall-of-Famer Tony Gwynn, who captured his first of what would be eight National League batting championships that year (he would also win in 1987–89 and from 1994 to 1997; Gwynn shares the National League record with Honus Wagner). Gwynn, who also would win five National League Gold Gloves during his career, joined the Padres in 1982 following starring roles in both baseball and basketball at San Diego State University (he still holds the school record for career basketball assists), and after having been selected in the previous year by both the Padres in the baseball draft and by the then San Diego Clippers in the National Basketball Association draft. The Padres pitching staff in 1984 featured Eric Show (15–9), Ed Whitson (14–8), Mark Thurmond (14–8), Tim Lollar (11–13), and Rich "Goose" Gossage as their closer (10–6, 2.90 ERA and 25 saves).

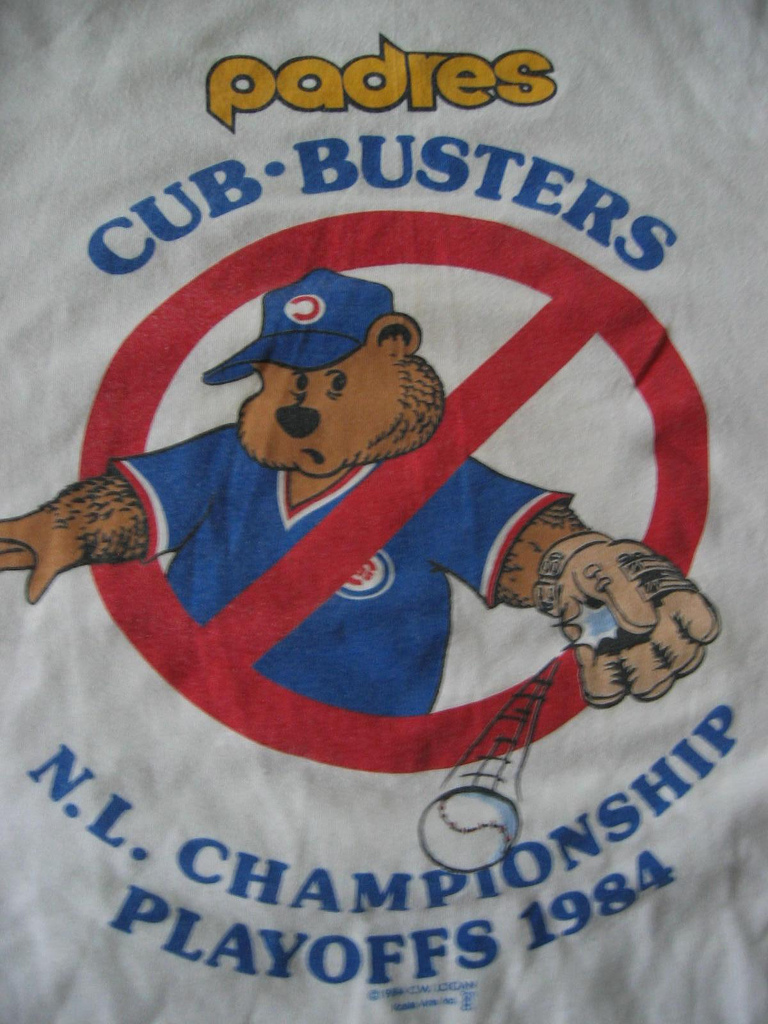
Cub-Busters t-shirts were popular with Padres fans in the 1984 postseason.

In the 1984 NLCS, the Padres faced the NL East champion Chicago Cubs, who were making their first post-season appearance since 1945 and featured NL Most Valuable Player Ryne Sandberg and Cy Young Award winner Rick Sutcliffe. The Cubs would win the first two games at Wrigley Field, and were less than two innings away from a series sweep when their luck changed. The Padres swept the final three games at then San Diego Jack Murphy Stadium (the highlight arguably being Steve Garvey's dramatic, game-winning home run off of Lee Smith in Game 4) to win the 1984 National League pennant. Gossage, a former New York Yankee, said the San Diego crowd at Game 3 was "the loudest crowd I've ever heard anywhere." Gwynn agreed as well. Jack Murphy Stadium played "Cub-Busters", a parody of the theme song from the 1984 movie Ghostbusters. Cub-Busters T-shirts inspired from the movie were popular attire for Padres fans.

In the 1984 World Series, the Padres faced the powerful Detroit Tigers, who steamrolled through the regular season with 104 victories (and had started out with a 35–5 record, the best ever through the first 40 games). The Tigers were managed by Sparky Anderson and featured shortstop and native San Diegan Alan Trammell and outfielder Kirk Gibson, along with Lance Parrish and DH Darrell Evans. The pitching staff was bolstered by ace Jack Morris (19–11, 3.60 ERA), Dan Petry (18–8), Milt Wilcox (17–8), and closer Willie Hernández (9–3, 1.92 ERA with 32 saves). Jack Morris would win games 1 and 4 and the Tigers would go on to win the Series 4-games-to-1.

Reporter Barry Bloom of MLB.com wrote in 2011 that "the postseason in '84 is still the most exciting week of Major League Baseball ever played in San Diego."

=== 1985–1995: Tough times following a pennant ===
After the Padres won the pennant in 1984, they had some tough times. Tony Gwynn continued to win batting titles (including batting .394 in 1994). The Padres would come close in 1985. They would field eight All-Stars (manager Dick Williams, Tony Gwynn, Graig Nettles, Rich Gossage, Terry Kennedy, Garry Templeton, Steve Garvey, and LaMarr Hoyt) at the 1985 All-Star Game in Minnesota. However, they collapsed at the end of the season, finishing tied for third with the Houston Astros behind the Los Angeles Dodgers and Cincinnati Reds.

Williams was let go as manager just before 1986 spring training. His record with the Padres was 337–311 over four seasons. As of 2011, he was the only manager in the team's history without a losing season. His difficulties with the Padres stemmed from a power struggle with team president Ballard Smith and general manager Jack McKeon. Late in the 1986 season, Gossage was suspended and then reinstated with a $25,000 fine for behavior not in the best interest of the team. Gossage said that Smith "wants choirboys and not winning players" and that Smith "just listens to what Mom says", a reference to Padres owner Kroc, Smith's mother-in-law. Gossage also said Kroc was "poisoning the world with her cheeseburgers." He later apologized to McDonald's, which Gossage said his family would continue to frequent.

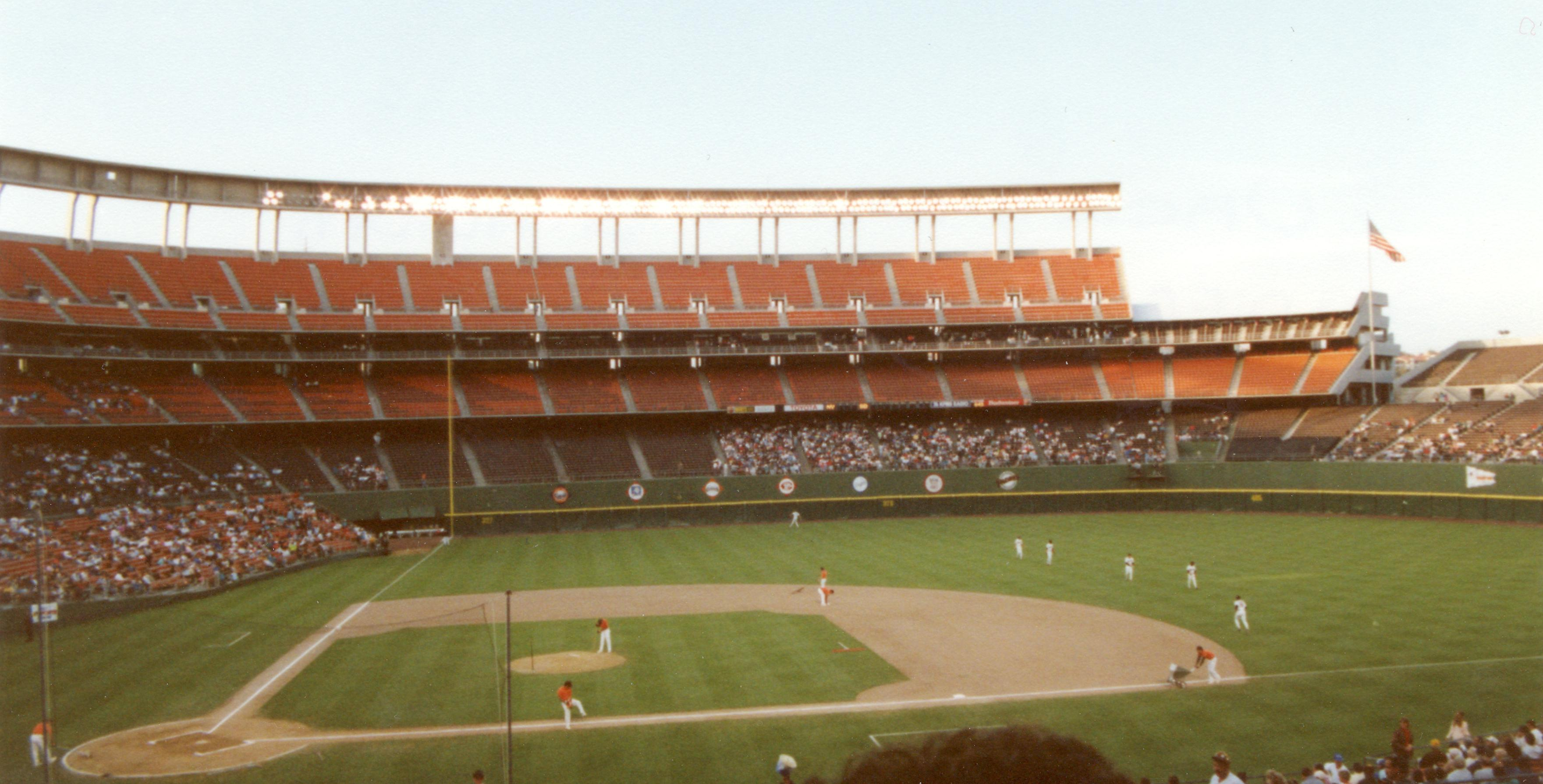
Jack Murphy Stadium in 1990; the Padres played there from 1969 through 2003.

In 1987, rookie catcher Benito Santiago hit in 34 straight games, earning him the NL Rookie of the Year Award. However, the Padres finished dead last in 1987, thanks to the managing of the tempestuous Larry Bowa. The next season, rookie second baseman Roberto Alomar would make his debut, forming a double play combination with veteran shortstop Garry Templeton. During the 1988 season, Bowa was replaced by Jack McKeon and the Padres won 83 games, finishing in third place. Team president Chub Feeney resigned after giving the finger to fans carrying a sign reading "SCRUB CHUB" on Fan Appreciation Night. In 1989, the Padres finished 89–73 thanks to Cy Young Award-winning closer Mark Davis. Between 1989 and 1990, friction dominated the Padres' clubhouse as Tony Gwynn had constant shouting matches with slugger Jack Clark. But as the franchise player, Gwynn prevailed as Clark finished his career with the Red Sox.

Midway through the 1990 season, Joan Kroc wanted to sell the team, but she wanted a commitment to San Diego. Kroc sold the team to television producer Tom Werner. Just under six weeks into his new ownership role, Werner attempted to cross-promote the team with one of his television series in between games of a twi-night doubleheader versus the Cincinnati Reds at Jack Murphy Stadium on July 25, 1990. On an evening billed as Working Women's Night at the ballpark, he had invited Roseanne Barr, the eponymous star of one of his sitcoms, to perform "The Star-Spangled Banner". She comically sang the national anthem with a loud, screechy voice. After finishing her rendition, she grabbed her crotch and spat at the ground in an attempt to parody baseball players. The publicity stunt was met with condemnation from baseball fans, sportswriters, and even the President, some of whom called it either the "Barr-Mangled Banner" or the "Barr-Strangled Banner".

Under Werner, the old brown that remained in Padres uniforms since their inception were supplanted by navy blue, a nod to the vintage 1940s PCL franchise colors. A trade was also made with the Toronto Blue Jays where Joe Carter and Roberto Alomar were traded for Fred McGriff and Tony Fernández. In 1992, the Padres lineup featured the "Four Tops": Gary Sheffield, Fred McGriff, Tony Fernández, and Tony Gwynn. However, Fernandez would go to the New York Mets, McGriff went to the division-winning Atlanta Braves, and Sheffield would go to the expansion Florida Marlins. Although extremely unpopular at the time, it was the Sheffield trade that brought in pitcher Trevor Hoffman, who was virtually unknown to Padres fans. While Sheffield led Florida to a World Championship in 1997, Hoffman would be the next franchise player behind Dave Winfield and Tony Gwynn. The Padres would finish dead last in the strike-shortened 1994 season, but Gwynn hit .394 that year (the most since Ted Williams hit over .400 in 1941) and pitcher Andy Benes led the NL in strikeouts. After that season, the Padres made a mega-trade with Houston reeling in Ken Caminiti, Steve Finley, and others. In November 1995, Kevin Towers was promoted from scouting director to general manager.

=== 1996–1998: Building a winner ===
In 1996, under new owner John Moores (a software tycoon who purchased controlling ownership in the team in 1994 from Tom Werner, who subsequently formed a syndicate that purchased the Boston Red Sox) and team president Larry Lucchino, and with a team managed by former Padres catcher Bruce Bochy (a member of the 1984 NL championship squad), the team won the NL West in an exciting race, sweeping the Los Angeles Dodgers at Dodger Stadium in the final series of the regular season. The '96 team featured Gwynn, who won his seventh National League batting championship, National League MVP Ken Caminiti, premier leadoff hitter Rickey Henderson, pitcher Fernando Valenzuela, first baseman Wally Joyner and outfielder Steve Finley. The Padres had led the NL West early in the season only to falter in June, but came back in July and battled the Dodgers the rest of the way. However, they were defeated in the National League Division Series by the Tony La Russa-led St. Louis Cardinals, 3 games to 0.

The Padres suffered an off year in 1997, plagued by a pitching slump. The one silver lining was Tony Gwynn's eighth and final National League batting title (To go along with a career high in home runs and RBIs), won in the final days of the season after a down-to-the wire duel with the Colorado Rockies' Larry Walker. Walker barely missed becoming the first Triple Crown winner in baseball since Carl Yastrzemski in 1967.

=== 1998: The second pennant ===
Padres cap logo (1998–2003)

In 1998, Henderson and Valenzuela were gone, but newly acquired (from the 1997 World Series champion Florida Marlins) pitcher Kevin Brown had a sensational year (his only one with the Padres) and outfielder/slugger Greg Vaughn hit 50 home runs (overlooked in that season of the Mark McGwire–Sammy Sosa race). Managed by Bruce Bochy and aided by the talents of players such as Tony Gwynn, Ken Caminiti, Wally Joyner, Steve Finley, pitcher Andy Ashby and premier closer Trevor Hoffman (4–2, 1.48 ERA and 53 saves), the Padres had their best year in history, finishing 98–64 and winning the NL West division crown.

In the next year, the team owners would make a bid to have the city of San Diego construct a new stadium for the Padres. To guarantee that the city fathers would vote in the affirmative, the Padres recruited a record number of players for the 1998 season, most of whom would become free agents in 1999. Therefore, they would have the best incentive to have a successful season, to get the best contracts possible (potentially with other teams), in 1999. This gambit was completely successful: the Padres had a record season, the new ballpark was approved, most of the stars of 1998 left, and the team would have a lackluster year in 1999.

The Padres defeated the Houston Astros in the 1998 NLDS, 3 games to 1, behind solid pitching by Brown and Hoffman, and home runs by Greg Vaughn, Wally Joyner and Jim Leyritz (who homered in 3 of the 4 games).

In the 1998 NLCS, the Padres faced the Atlanta Braves, who had won the National League East with an astonishing 106–56 record. The offense was paced by talent such as Andrés Galarraga, Chipper Jones, Andruw Jones and Javy López. Their pitching staff had the perennial big-3 of Greg Maddux (18–9, 2.22 ERA), Tom Glavine (20–6, 2.47 ERA), and John Smoltz (17–3, 2.90 ERA), as well as Kevin Millwood (17–8, 4.08 ERA) and Denny Neagle (16–11, 3.55 ERA). However, it was the Padres that would prevail, 4 games to 2, with ace Kevin Brown pitching a shutout in game 2 (winning 3–0). Steve Finley caught a pop fly for the final out, as the Padres clinched the series.

In the 1998 World Series the Padres faced the powerhouse New York Yankees, who had steamrolled through the season with a 114–48 record and drew acclaim as one their greatest teams of all time. There was no offensive player with more than 30 home runs, in contrast to the teams of the 1920s, or 1950s, but they had four players with 24+ and eight with 17+. Yankee pitching had been paced by David Cone (20–7, 3.55 ERA), Andy Pettitte (16–11, 4.24 ERA), David Wells (18–4, 3.49 ERA), Hideki Irabu (13–9, 4.06 ERA) and Orlando Hernández (12–4, 3.13 ERA). Mariano Rivera, their closer, was excellent once again (3–0, 1.91 ERA with 36 saves).

The Yankees swept the Padres in four games. Mariano Rivera closed out 3 of the 4 games. One of the few bright spots of the series for the Padres was a home run by Tony Gwynn, in Game 1, that hit the facing of the right-field upper deck at Yankee Stadium and put the Padres ahead briefly, 5–2. But the Yankees would score 7 runs in the 7th inning en route to a 9–6 victory.

This World Series loss by the Padres was the only time during the Yankees' dynasty of the 1990s that did not revive the rivalry between the New York Mets and the Atlanta Braves. Three of the four Yankees championships during their dynasty came against either team (1996 and 1999 against Atlanta, 2000 against New York).

=== 1999–2000: Last years of the 20th century ===
Entering the 1999 season, some instrumental players to the 1998 World Series team were gone. Brown, a free agent, signed the biggest contract in baseball history with the Dodgers. Finley, a free agent, signed with the Arizona Diamondbacks. Caminiti, a free agent went to the Houston Astros. Vaughn and utilityman Mark Sweeney were traded to the Cincinnati Reds for left fielder Reggie Sanders, infielder Damian Jackson and pitching prospect Josh Harris. Starting pitcher Joey Hamilton was traded to the Toronto Blue Jays for pitchers Woody Williams and Carlos Almanzar. The Padres opened their 1999 season in Monterrey, Mexico versus the Colorado Rockies. On August 6, 1999, Tony Gwynn got his 3,000th hit (a single) against the Montreal Expos at Olympic Stadium.

== 2001–present: 21st century ==
=== 2001–2003: Farewell to the Q ===
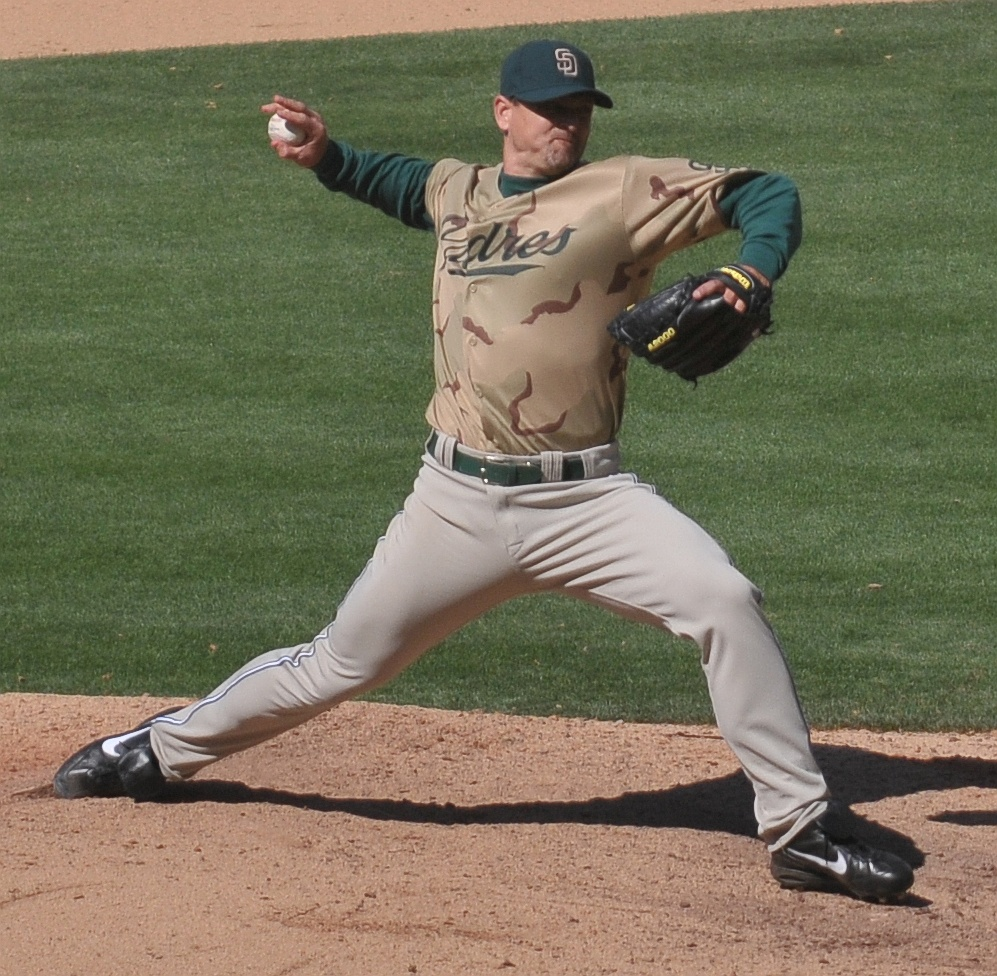
Trevor Hoffman served as the team's closer from 1993 to 2008.

On October 7, 2001, in a post-game ceremony at Qualcomm Stadium, Tony Gwynn made an emotional farewell to the team that had been his only major-league home. In the game played that day, Rickey Henderson, who in the meantime had rejoined the Padres, collected his 3,000th major-league base hit, a double. Gwynn struck his final major-league hit, also a double, in the previous game. He was the head coach of the San Diego State University Aztecs, his alma mater from 2003 to 2014. He was inducted into the National Baseball Hall of Fame on July 29, 2007. Gwynn died on June 16, 2014, of salivary gland cancer.

Also in 2001, Dave Winfield became the first player to be elected to the National Baseball Hall of Fame as a Padre.

=== 2004–2010: Petco Park, Division titles, close calls ===
After five straight losing seasons in Qualcomm Stadium (1999–2003), the Padres moved into newly built Petco Park before the start of their 2004 campaign. Petco Park is situated in downtown near San Diego's Gaslamp District, the main entrance located just two blocks from the downtown terminal of the San Diego Trolley light-rail system. With new amenities and a revitalization of the downtown neighborhood, fan interest renewed. Modeled after recent successes in downtown ballpark building (such as San Francisco's Oracle Park), and incorporating San Diego history in the form of the preservation of the facade of the historic Western Metals Company building (now the left-field corner, the corner of the building substituting for the left field foul pole), the new Petco Park is a sharp contrast to their previous home at Qualcomm (Jack Murphy) Stadium which was a cookie-cutter type football-baseball facility located in an outer, mostly commercial-industrial, area of the city near an interstate interchange.

With the ocean air prevalent and a sharp, clean park to play in, the Padres began to win again. The new stadium also acquired a reputation as a pitchers' park, with notable complaints from some of the Padres batters themselves (deep center field and evenings with dense foggy air). The Padres finished the 2004 season with an 87–75 record, good enough for 3rd in the NL West. The team somewhat rebranded itself going into the 2004 season, with new colors (navy blue and sand brown), new uniforms and a new advertising slogan, "Play Downtown", referring to the near-downtown location of the new ballpark. One of the bricks at the center plaza of Petco Park was secretly purchased by the People for the Ethical Treatment of Animals, an animal rights organization that has protested the breeding and purchasing of the animals sold at Petco stores. The brick reads, "Break out your cold ones. Toast the Padres. Enjoy this champion organization." The first letter of each word is really an acrostic urging people to boycott the stores.

In 2005, the Padres finished with the lowest-ever winning percentage for a division champion (or for that matter, a postseason qualifier) in a non-strike season, 82–80. Three teams in the Eastern Division finished with better records than San Diego but failed to qualify for the playoffs, including second-place Philadelphia, which won 88 games and all six of its contests with the Padres. There had been some speculation that the Padres would be the first team in history to win a division and finish below .500, but their victory over the Los Angeles Dodgers on September 30 gave them their 81st victory. In the 2005 NLDS, the reigning National League champion St. Louis Cardinals, who finished the season with the majors' best record, swept the Padres in three consecutive games. Thus the Padres finished the season with an overall regular-and-post-season record of 82–83, the first post-season qualifier in a normal-length season to lose more games than it won overall. The 2005 Padres featured bright spots, however, including ace pitcher Jake Peavy, the NL strikeout leader, and closer Trevor Hoffman, who claimed his 400th save.

The Padres their 2006 season with a 9–15 record in April, and were stuck in the cellar of the NL West. However, after going 19–10 in May, the club moved into first place in the division. Closer Trevor Hoffman was elected to the 2006 MLB All-Star Game in Pittsburgh, Pennsylvania, threw one inning in that game and got the loss. On September 24 (the last home game of the regular season), Hoffman became the all-time saves leader when he recorded his 479th career save, breaking Lee Smith's record of 478 (Hoffman's career total as of the end of the season was 482). Hoffman's 2006 campaign (2.14 ERA, 46 saves in 51 opportunities through 65 games pitched) was one of his best. The 2006 Padres would attribute their success largely to the team's pitching staff. Their ERA was 3.87, first in the NL and trailing only the Detroit Tigers in all of MLB.

On September 30, 2006, the Padres clinched a playoff berth with a 3–1 win over the Arizona Diamondbacks. In the final game of the season, the Padres defeated the Diamondbacks 7–6 to win back to back division titles for the first time in team history (they were tied with the Dodgers for the division title, but because of winning the season series against them, the division title went to them and the wild card went to the Dodgers). The final out of the final game of the 2006 regular season — confirming the Padres as Division champions — was a highly unusual play. With Trevor Hoffman pitching the 9th, 2 out, Diamondback Chris Young was on first. Alberto Callaspo hit a grounder past first. Second baseman Josh Barfield fielded and threw wildly to first, forcing Gonzalez to come off the bag. However, Gonzalez then threw to Khalil Greene at second, beating but not tagging Young. Second base umpire Larry Poncino initially called safe because of the no-tag, but Padres manager Bruce Bochy successfully argued that the force play at second did not need a tag to be declared out. The game, and the season, ended with a changed call. TV replay, however, clearly showed that Greene was off the bag as well, so the original call may have been correct. This call, understandably, was greeted by a long and loud chorus of boos by the Diamondbacks fans who packed Chase Field to bid farewell to Luis Gonzalez.

Only 53 teams in the modern era have posted sub-.500 records in April and survived to make the postseason. The San Diego Padres achieved the feat in both 2005 and 2006. The Padres opened the 2006 National League Division Series at home against the St. Louis Cardinals on Tuesday, October 3, 2006. After losing the first two games at home (5–1 and 2–0 respectively), they won game 3 at Busch Stadium 3–1, but were eliminated with a 6–2 loss in Game 4, when the Cardinals, who trailed 2–0 before their first at-bat, scored six unanswered runs (two in the first, and four in the sixth) for the win. After the end of the 2006 season, the Padres had an overall post-season record of 12–22, losing 10 of their last 11 games since winning the National League pennant in 1998.

One key offseason trade between the San Diego Padres' General Manager, Kevin Towers, and the Texas Rangers' General Manager, Jon Daniels, would prove to have a dramatic impact on their 2006 season. The Padres dealt starting pitcher Adam Eaton, middle reliever Akinori Otsuka, and minor-league catcher Billy Killian in exchange for starting pitcher Chris Young, left fielder Terrmel Sledge, and first baseman Adrián González. González would take over the everyday duties at first base, batting .304 with a club-leading 24 home runs and 82 RBI in his first year as a full-time starter. Sledge would hit .229 in limited major league action. Chris Young proved to be the real story, however, as he would go 11–5 with a 3.46 ERA (6th best in the National League) and allowed just 6.72 hits per 9 innings pitched – best in the majors.

2006 also ended up being the last year of Bruce Bochy's tenure as the manager of the Padres, taking the managerial position for their divisional rivals, the San Francisco Giants. He was replaced by Bud Black, a San Diego State University alumni and former pitching coach of the Los Angeles Angels of Anaheim.

On Sunday, April 1, 2007, Major League Baseball's 2007 Opening Night, the Padres announced that they had agreed to terms on a four-year contract with 1B Adrián González, keeping him in San Diego until 2010 with a club option for 2011. Prior to this contract agreement the Padres had offered to renew González's contract during the offseason at $380,500, only $500 over the league minimum for the 2007 season. The Padres' 2007 season began in April 3 in an away game against the San Francisco Giants, winning it 7–0 in front of a capacity crowd of 42,773 at AT&T Park, defeating $126 million staff-ace Barry Zito in his Giants debut. The Padres bullpen continued to be the team's strength as in recent years, opening the season with 28 1/3 scoreless innings, a Major League record to start a season. At the start of the season the Padres starting rotation order was as follows: Jake Peavy, Chris Young, Clay Hensley (injured, replaced by Justin Germano), Greg Maddux, David Wells.

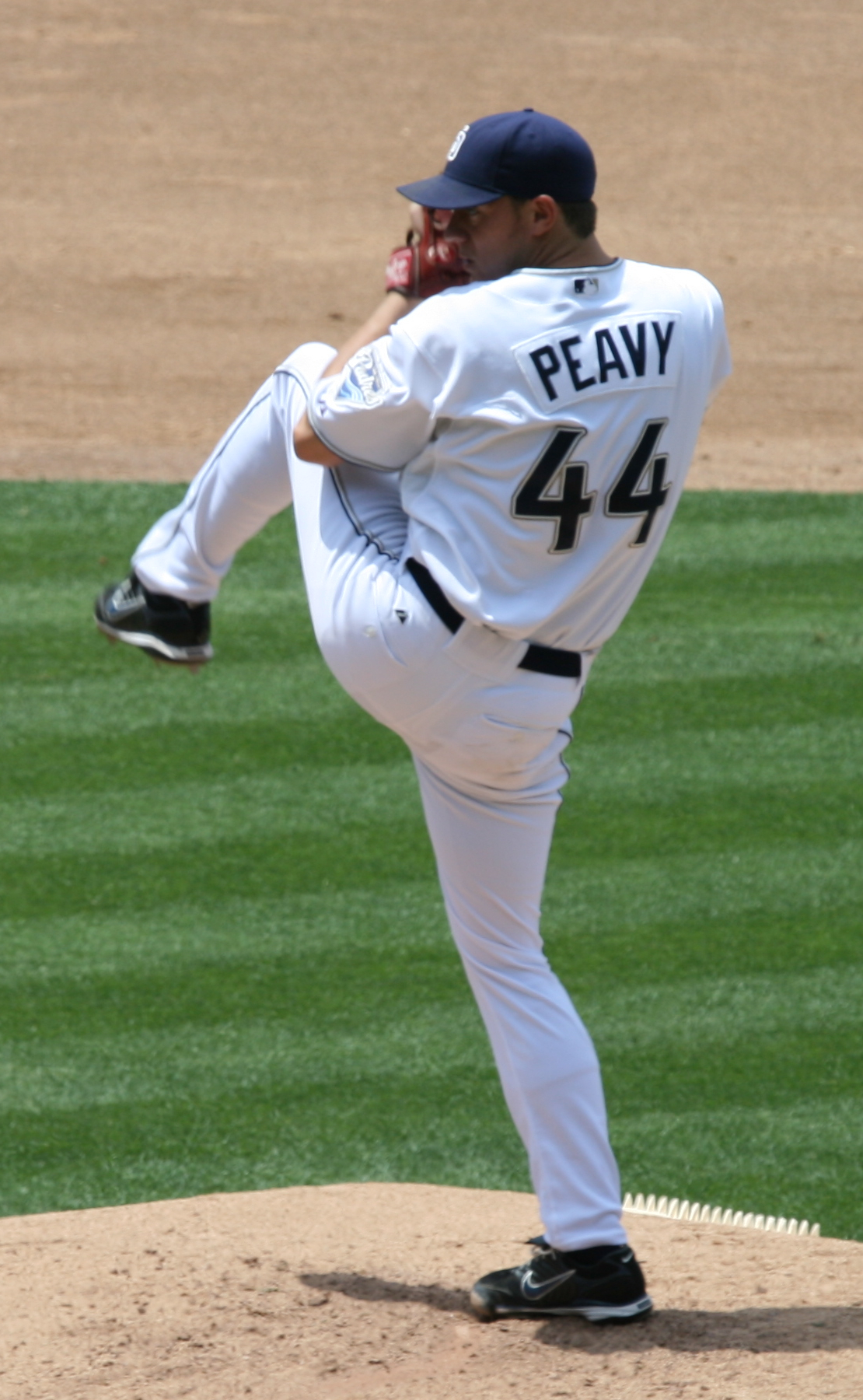
Jake Peavy won the NL Cy Young Award with the team in 2007.

On June 4, 2007, Jake Peavy was named NL Pitcher of the Month after going 4–0 with a 0.79 ERA in May. The next day, Trevor Hoffman was named the "DHL Presents the Major League Baseball Delivery Man of the Month Award" for May 2007. The award recognizes the most outstanding relief pitcher during each month of the regular season. On June 6, 2007, Trevor Hoffman became the first pitcher in major league history to record 500 saves, 498 of them coming as a Padre (the first 2 were as a Florida Marlin).

On September 23, 2007, Milton Bradley tore his right ACL while being restrained by Padres manager Bud Black during an altercation with first base umpire Mike Winters. Home plate umpire Brian Runge reportedly told Bradley that Winters said that Bradley had tossed his bat in Runge's direction in a previous at-bat. After Bradley reached first base, he questioned Winters about the alleged bat throwing and subsequent communication with Runge. According to Bradley and Padres first base coach Bobby Meacham, Winters used a profanity towards Bradley. Bradley then moved towards Winters. While restrained by Black, Bradley fell to the ground resulting in the injury. He missed the last week of the regular season in 2007, during which the Padres relinquished their wild card lead, ultimately losing to the eventual N.L. Champion Colorado Rockies in a one-game playoff.

The Padres ended the regular season in an 89–73 tie for the NL wild card with the Colorado Rockies. In a cruel piece of irony, on September 29, 2007, the Padres were within one out and one strike of clinching the National League Wild Card berth, but Tony Gwynn Jr., son of the longtime Padres legend, tripled against Hoffman to tie the game. The Padres went on to lose that game, and the one that followed, even though the Milwaukee Brewers had been eliminated from the pennant race and had nothing left to play for. The Padres then met the Rockies on October 1, 2007, in Denver for a one-game playoff to decide the wild card winner. Despite having Jake Peavy start the game and bringing in Trevor Hoffman in the bottom of the 13th inning to try to hold an 8–6 lead, the Padres' season ended when the Rockies rallied to win 9–8. It ended on a controversial call on a sacrifice fly where many questioned whether Matt Holliday ever touched home plate, leaving Padre fans saying "Holliday never touched home!" The umpire of that game claimed that the catcher, Michael Barrett, was blocking the plate before he had possession of the ball. Therefore, Holiday was ruled safe.

Following the season, Jake Peavy won the National League Cy Young Award by unanimous ballot on November 15. He was the fourth Padre to capture the pitching award. The Padres entered the 2007–08 offseason with a number of questions, including the ability of Trevor Hoffman to close games past his 40th birthday, the ongoing inability to hold runners on base (the Padres' caught-stealing ratio in 2007 was one of the worst in baseball history), two holes in the back of the starting rotation, and the possible departure of Mike Cameron to free agency. The two holes in the rotation were filled by former Dodger Randy Wolf and Mark Prior and the club dealt for Jim Edmonds to replace Cameron. Additionally, Milton Bradley was signed by the Texas Rangers.

The Padres signed Mark Prior to a one-year deal in the off-season. Prior, a University of San Diego HS graduate (now Cathedral HS), joined a team that consisted of players that were also local prep stars, Brian Giles (Granite Hills HS), Adrián González (Eastlake HS), and Óscar Robles (Montgomery HS). Recent Padres teams had also included Dave Roberts (Rancho Buena Vista HS), David Wells (Point Loma HS), and Marcus Giles (Granite Hills HS).

The Padres started their 2008 campaign March 31, in San Diego against the Houston Astros, and won the series 3–1. On April 17, 2008, during the series against the Colorado Rockies at Petco Park, the Padres played the longest game in team history, in terms of innings (22), losing 2–1. The game was the second longest in team history, in terms of time, played in 6 hours, 16 minutes; the game was a minute shorter than the longest game, in terms of time, played against the Houston Astros in 1980. Following that game, which sapped the team's bullpen strength, the Padres stumbled, dropping games at home, where they struggled to score runs, and on the road, where they committed uncharacteristic errors and failed to hold leads. Returning home after a humbling three-game sweep in Atlanta in early May, the Padres cut Jim Edmonds, the Cardinals castoff who had been brought in after the Padres failed to sign Mike Cameron to a new deal in the off-season. With former Indian Jody Gerut now in center, the Padres won the three-game weekend home series with the Rockies and motored to Chicago with the hopes of winning three of four to get the season back on track. Instead, the Cubs, with Jim Edmonds in center, won three of four and booted the Padres from the Windy City into an interleague series with the Mariners, their Peoria, Ariz. spring training neighbors. The Mariners used speed—and a late-inning burst of power from Adrián Beltré in one game—to win the series and shove the Padres deeper into their early-season hole. After sweeping the New York Mets in a four-game series that ended on June 8, the Padres climbed to 7 games back of first-place Arizona. The sweep put the Mets 7.5 games behind the first-place Philadelphia Phillies, sending the Padres and the Mets, expansion teams in the 1960s, in different directions. The Padres won two of three games in a series against the Dodgers at Petco Park. There was talk in San Diego that the Padres had a serious chance to get back in the race in a weak NL West. A road trip sent the Padres to play the Indians in Cleveland, where they lost two of the three games. During their final trip to Yankee Stadium, the site of Tony Gwynn's upperdeck World Series blast, the Padres were swept by the Yankees.

They returned to Petco and dropped two of three to the Tigers. They were then swept by the Twins and Mariners. Returning to National League competition did not help much, as Padres lost two of three in Colorado to the Rockies. Powered by former Diamondbacks outfielder Scott Hairston, the Padres won two of three in Arizona. The team could not sustain the momentum however and they lost two of three to the Marlins at Petco Park. In the last series before the All-Star break, the Padres lost two of three to the Braves. Adrián González represented the Padres at the All-Star Game at Yankee Stadium, going 1–3 with an RBI. González made a nice scoop on a throw from catcher Russell Martin during a tense moment late in the game but he struck out with a chance to drive in the go-ahead run late in the game. According to media reports, González was asked during an All-Star game media session what it would take for the Padres to make the playoffs. He said 30 wins. When the interviewer asked if he thought that was possible, González glared at the interviewer and did not answer the question.

On July 17, the Padres traded former San Diego State player Tony Clark to the Diamondbacks for minor league pitcher Evan Scribner. Following the All-Star break, the Padres continued to struggle, getting swept in a four-game series in St. Louis and losing two of three in Cincinnati. A trip to Pittsburgh proved to be the tonic the team needed. The Padres won three of four in the Steel City and during the series the Pirates traded former Padre underachiever Xavier Nady to the Yankees for prospects. Back home, the Padres won the first game of the series against the division-leading Diamondbacks. The win gave Greg Maddux 351 career wins and he tipped his hat to the crowd when he left with a lead. Late in August, the team parted ways with Greg Maddux by trading him to the Los Angeles Dodgers.

As this disastrous season started to come to a close, questions about the coaching staff started swirling like crazy. In mid-September, Hitting Coach Wally Joyner resigned due to the team's lackluster offense and a difference in philosophy with upper management (most notably, CEO Sandy Alderson). It seems that Joyner beat the Padres to the punch, as he was likely to be replaced at the end of the season. The team finished off a 63–99 season on September 28 with a 10–6 loss to the Pittsburgh Pirates, finishing 5th in the NL West, 21 games behind the division leader Los Angeles Dodgers.

On September 29, the team renewed the contracts of Manager Bud Black, Pitching Coach Darren Balsley, Bullpen Coach Darrell Akerfelds, 3rd Base Coach Glenn Hoffman (brother of closer Trevor Hoffman) and 1st Base Coach Rick Renteria. Only Bench Coach Craig Colbert was not renewed and because of Wally Joyner's earlier resignation the team had no Hitting Coach to bring back. On October 10, the Padres offered Trevor Hoffman a $4 million salary for 2009 plus a $4 million club option in 2010 then on November 11 the Padres withdrew the $4 million offer to the all-time saves leader, making him a free agent.

The Padres opened 2009 on April 6 versus the rival Dodgers at home, losing 4–1 and splitting the four-game series. They then swept the Giants, also at home in three games. Then they took 2 of 3 from the Mets to ruin the first series at Citi Field. In that series, Jody Gerut became the first player in major league history to open a new ballpark with a leadoff home run. After the first three series, the Padres were tied with the Dodgers for first place at 7–3. After the hot start however, the Padres stumbled and were 25–25 as of May 31. Early in the season, the Padres acquired Tony Gwynn Jr., son of franchise great Tony Gwynn, from the Milwaukee Brewers. San Diego finished 75–87, fourth in the NL West, only ahead of the Arizona Diamondbacks.

Many preseason predictions picked the Padres in 2010 to finish the season in last place in the NL West. On August 25, however, the Padres were 76–49 and in first place with a 6 1/2 game lead. A 10–game losing streak immediately followed. With a 3–0 loss on October 3, the final game of the season, the Padres were officially eliminated from playoff contention and the eventual World Series champion San Francisco Giants won the division. The Padres led the NL West for 148 days in 2010.

=== 2011–2019: The dark ages ===
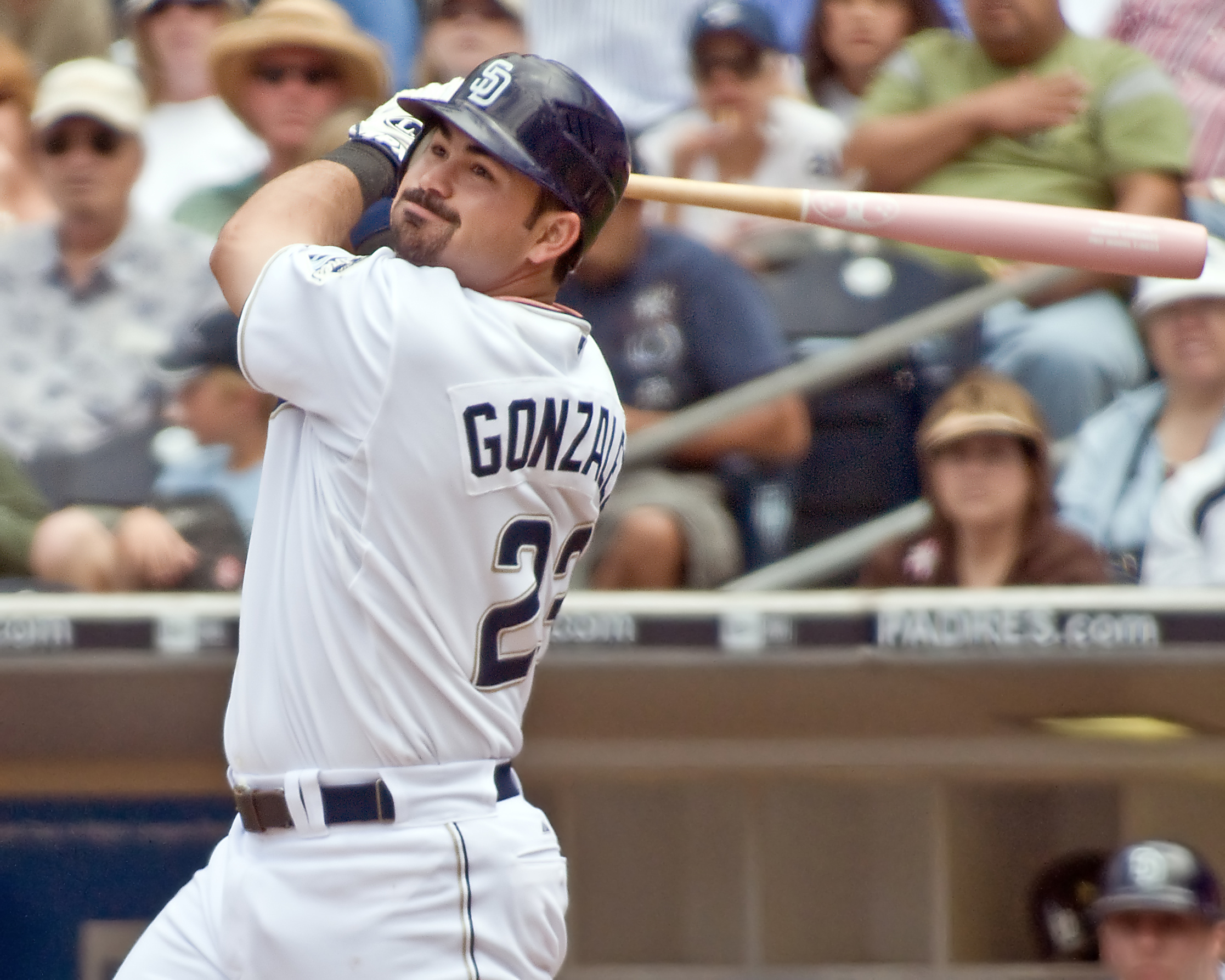
Following the trade of longtime player Adrián González in 2010, the team failed to record a winning season for the rest of the decade.

Adrián González would have been in the last year of his contract in 2011, but the Padres were not going to meet González's open market value especially with Jeff Moorad's purchase of the Padres from John Moores not completing until around 2013. On December 6, 2010, González was traded to the Boston Red Sox for a package of right-handed pitcher Casey Kelly, first baseman Anthony Rizzo, outfielder Reymond Fuentes, and a player to be named later, later determined to be Eric Patterson.

After the 2011 season, general manager Jed Hoyer left the Padres to join the Chicago Cubs. Josh Byrnes was promoted from senior vice president of baseball operations to replace Hoyer.

Byrnes made two big trades in the offseason. He traded Rizzo to Hoyer's new club, the Cubs, in a four-player trade that brought right-hander Andrew Cashner to the Padres. Byrnes also traded young ace Mat Latos to the Reds for starting pitcher Edinson Vólquez and prospects Yonder Alonso, catcher Yasmani Grandal and pitcher Brad Boxberger. Former Reds general manager Jim Bowden commented that the Padres clearly won the trade with the Reds, saying "In modern times, I can't remember a trade that was this far lopsided."

In March 2012, Moorad withdrew his application to complete the full purchase of the Padres. He stepped down as CEO of the Padres later that month, but remained with the team as vice-chairman. Media outlets including U-T San Diego, Fox Sports, and Associated Press speculated that Moorad was short of the needed support of 22 MLB team owners to complete the purchase of the Padres. Moores declared that the entire team was up for sale again in April, citing the good opportunity in the market after the record $2 billion sale of the Los Angeles Dodgers.

In August, MLB approved Moores' $800 million sale of the Padres to a group led by beer distributor Ron Fowler that included four heirs to the O'Malley family, who owned the Dodgers for five decades. The sale completed on or before August 28, 2012. As much as $200 million of the sale price includes the team's 20-percent stake in Fox Sports San Diego. Members of the O'Malley family include Kevin and Brian O'Malley, who are the sons of former Dodgers owner Peter O'Malley and grandsons of Walter O'Malley, the owner who moved the Dodgers west from Brooklyn after the 1957 season. Peter and Tom Seidler are the nephews of Peter O'Malley. Fowler was named the ownership group's executive chairman and was named the Padres representative in all league meetings. He was the first locally based control person of the team since founding owner C. Arnholdt Smith.

The team would not post a winning record for the remainder of the decade. Bud Black was fired in the middle of the 2015 season and was replaced by Andy Green after the season. On February 21, 2019, the Padres signed Manny Machado to a record-breaking 10-year, $300 million contract. Top prospect Fernando Tatís Jr. also made the team's Opening Day roster out of spring training. However, Machado and Tatis were unable to prevent San Diego from finishing last in their division in 2019 with a 70–92 record. The Padres were one of four teams to never reach the postseason during the 2010s, the others being the White Sox, the Mariners, and the Marlins.

=== 2020–present: Re-emergence and disappointing seasons ===
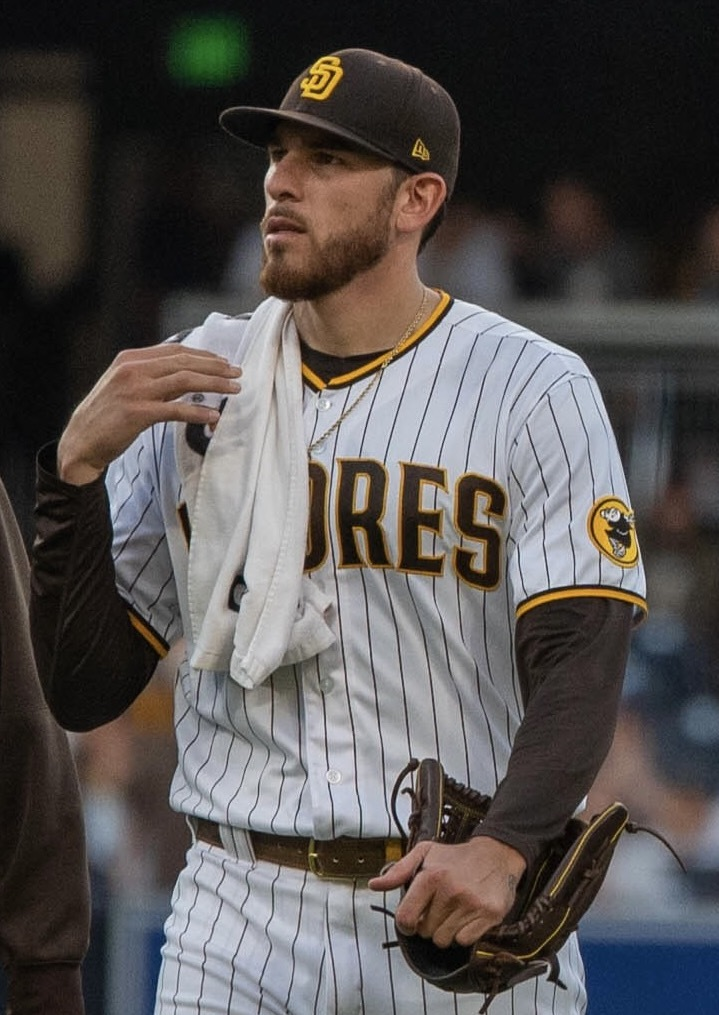
Joe Musgrove pitched the first no-hitter in Padres history on April 9, 2021.

Jayce Tingler replaced Green as the team's manager for the 2020 season. From August 17 to August 20, during a four-game series against the Texas Rangers, the Padres became the first team in MLB history to hit a grand slam in four consecutive games. In the pandemic-shortened season, the Padres went 37–23 and qualified for the playoffs for the first time since 2006. They won the best-of-three Wild Card Series against the St. Louis Cardinals before being swept in the NLDS against the eventual World Series champion Los Angeles Dodgers.

On April 9, 2021, Joe Musgrove threw the first no-hitter in franchise history against the Texas Rangers. The no-hitter also broke the Padres' streak of having gone 8,205 games without throwing one, a major league record. The Padres entered the 2021 season expecting to contend for the World Series and held a playoff position in the Wild Card standings from April to late August. The Padres struggled down the stretch after reaching a season high 66–49 record, going 13–34 the rest of the way. The Padres were eliminated from playoff contention on September 25 and finished the 2021 season with a 79–83 record.

In 2022, despite Fernando Tatís Jr. missing the entire season due to an injury and a PED-related suspension, the Padres won 89 games to make the postseason. This was aided by the mid-season acquisition of young superstar Juan Soto and veteran Josh Bell from the Washington Nationals. After upsetting the 101-win New York Mets in the Wild Card series in three games played at Citi Field, the Padres faced the division rival Dodgers in the NLDS. After losing Game 1 at Dodger Stadium, the Padres won the next three games to clinch their first NLCS berth since 1998. The Padres were eliminated by the Philadelphia Phillies in five games in the NLCS.

In 2023, the Padres entered the season with high expectations. During the 2022-23 MLB offseason, the Padres signed prized free agent Xander Bogaerts to an 11-year deal. Furthermore, the Padres anticipated that their star shortstop and right fielder, Fernando Tatis Jr., would return to the team on April 20 after missing the entire 2022 season due to an injury and an 80-game suspension. Given the Padres' performance in 2022 and their reinforcements for 2023, several observers, analysts, and pundits predicted that the Padres would win the division over the perennial favorite Los Angeles Dodgers, who had won the NL West in nine of the previous ten seasons. However, the Padres failed to meet the lofty expectations. They disappointingly hovered around or below a .500 win percentage for much of the season, and despite a strong September, the Padres missed the playoffs. On September 29, the Padres were mathematically eliminated from postseason contention after a Miami Marlins win against the Pittsburgh Pirates.

On November 14, Padres Chairman and owner Peter Seidler died at 63. Eric Kutsenda is the current interim primary owner of the club, through his position at Seidler's private equity firm.

The Padres opened their 2024 season in Seoul, South Korea against the Los Angeles Dodgers. On July 26, offseason trade acquisition Dylan Cease threw the second no-hitter in franchise history, in a 3-0 win against the Washington Nationals at Nationals Park.

In April of 2026, a deal was being finalized for the Padres to be sold to José E. Feliciano for $3.9 billion. On August 27, 2026 MLB ownership approved the sale to José E. Feliciano and his wife Kwanza Jones.
