= History of San Diego State University =

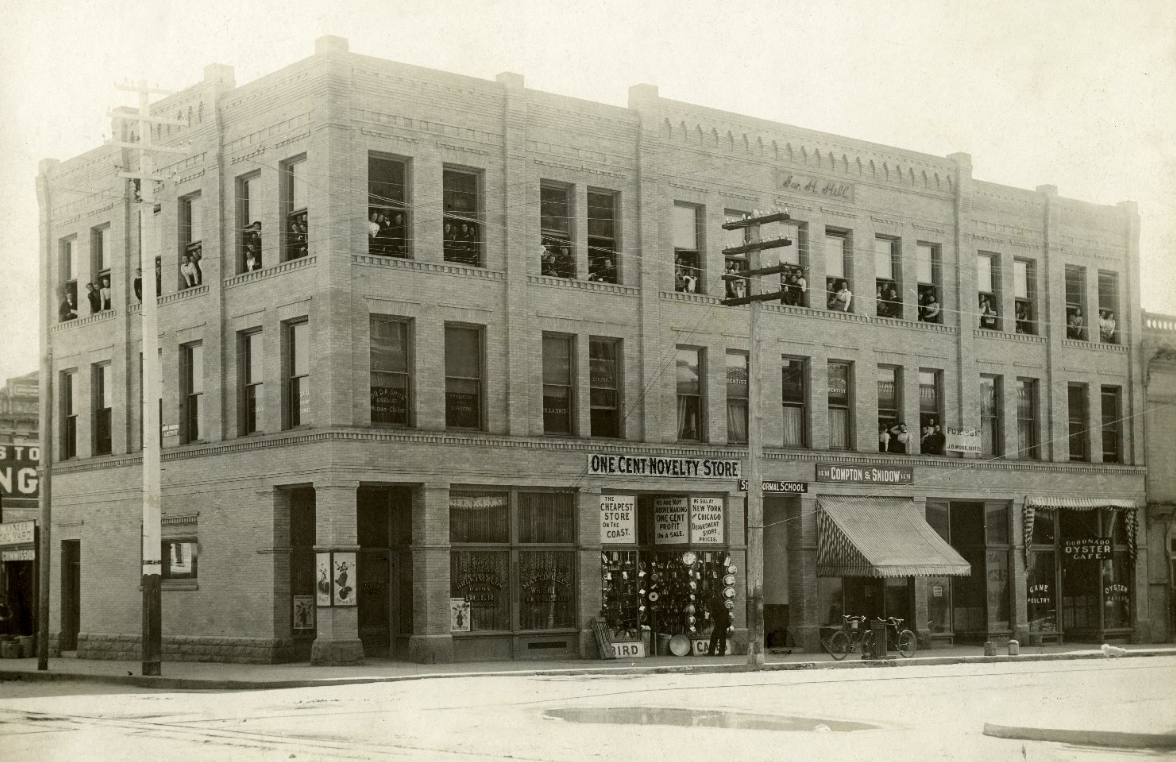
The upper floor of the Hill building, located at 6th and F streets, was the temporary location of the San Diego Normal School in 1898. The school would later expand and change names several times until deciding on the current name, San Diego State University.

The history of San Diego State University (SDSU) began in the late 19th century with the establishment of a normal school in San Diego, California. Founded on March 13, 1897, the school opened on November 1, 1898, with a class of 135 students. By 1921, the school had become San Diego State Teachers College, allowing it to grant certificates and degrees. Due to the increased student enrollment, the college was relocated to its current location at the east side of Mission Valley, with classes beginning in February 1931. The government works programs during the Great Depression assisted in construction of numerous buildings on the new campus.

World War I and II both affected student enrollment, and led many students and faculty members to serve in the armed forces. By the end of the 1950s, the student population was at 10,000, and the renamed San Diego State College was now the fourth largest California state institution. In the 1960s and 1970s the campus saw increased enrollment, the accreditation of its professional schools, multiple incidents of student activism, and on January 1, 1974, a new name: San Diego State University (SDSU). By 1987, the university's population peaked at nearly 36,000 students and attained the status of the largest university in California and tenth in the nation.

Recently, the university has worked to improve its academic rankings, and faced adversities including a school shooting and a large drug bust. As the university continues to grant numerous degrees in various fields, it has developed several construction plans for replacement of some of its older buildings and infrastructure.

== Establishment ==
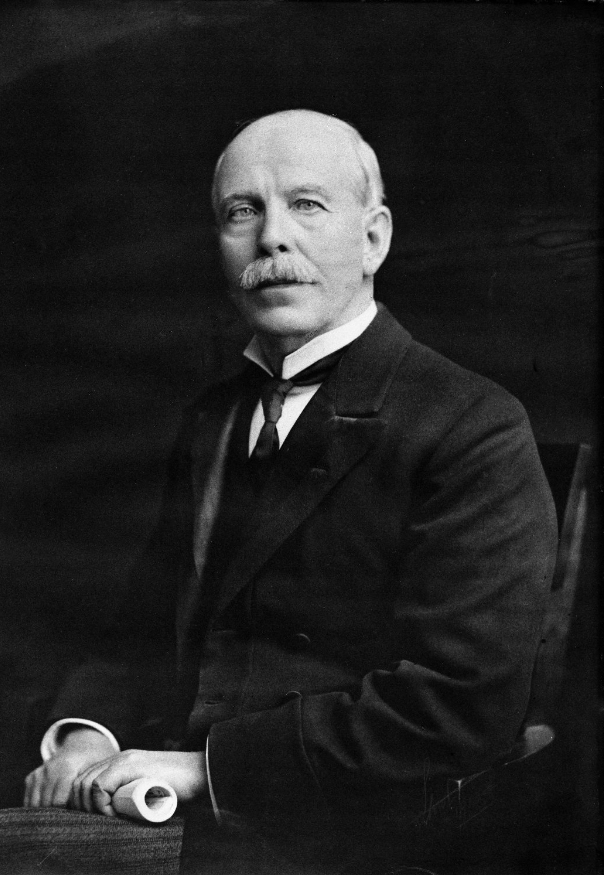
Samuel T. Black in 1905

In the late 1890s, San Diego officials believed that a normal school should be established to help the town grow and increase certification of teachers. The tuition and travel for out-of-town normal schools were large and San Diegans desired to have a closer school. San Diego had to compete with Fresno, Los Angeles, and several other cities for a school, and its first attempt to establish one in 1895 was vetoed by California governor James Budd. On March 13, 1897, Governor Budd changed course and signed legislation appropriating $50,000 to allow for the establishment of a state normal school in San Diego, to be located in University Heights. By 1905, total funds appropriated to the school totaled $333,300.

The board of trustees for San Diego Normal School was established by Budd and first met on June 3, 1897. They appointed Samuel T. Black, who had previously served as the California state superintendent of public instruction, as president of the new school by unanimous decision on October 1, 1898. On January 21, 1898, the San Diego firm Hebbard and Gill was selected to design the new school building. The architect Irving Gill, who developed the building in a Beaux-Arts style, was responsible for the design. The ground was broken for construction on August 1, the cornerstone of the building was laid on December 10, and the building was dedicated on May 1, 1899. During the building's construction, the first classes were held at the Hill Block on the southwest corner of 6th and F street in downtown San Diego beginning on November 1, 1898. The classes moved to the Normal School in May 1899, even as construction continued. 135 students (90% of whom were women), were enrolled by the end of the first year; enrollment grew to 400 by 1910.

In the summer of 1899, San Diego Normal School became the first California normal school to offer summer courses, and maintained this position until 1913. On June 21, 1900, the first class was graduated: 23 women and three men. Later that year, the east wing of the initial building was finished, adding 18 rooms. In 1903, $61,000 was appropriated by the state for a west wing; it included a gym, library, laboratories, lecture rooms, and a museum. The west wing was completed in September 1904. In 1906, the California legislature required that students have a high school diploma in order to be admitted to a normal school. This was the same requirement as for entry into the University of California.

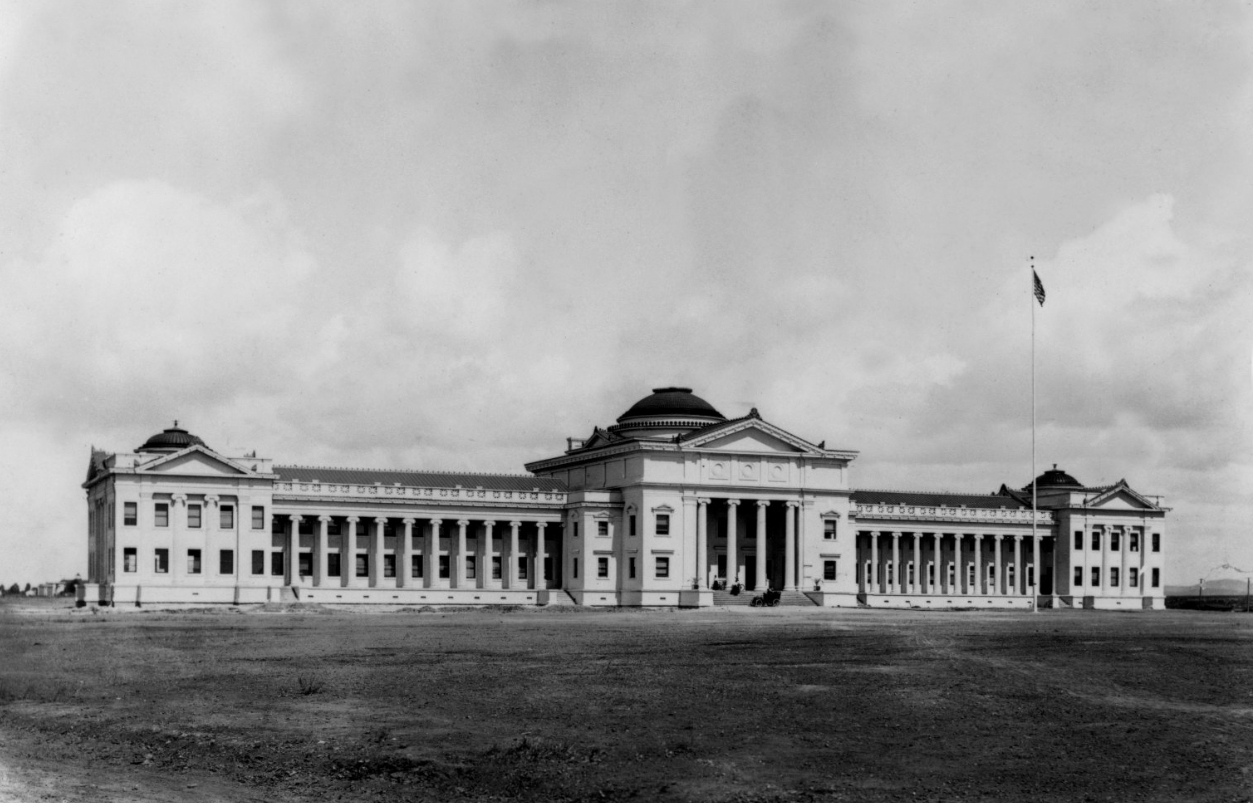
San Diego Normal School in 1904

In 1910, Samuel Black resigned, and was replaced by Edward L. Hardy, who had previously served as the principal of San Diego High School. He increased the faculty size from 19 to 27 in 1912 to meet the demands of increased enrollment. The annual salary for the president increased to $4,000 (from $3,400) in 1915 and salaries for the faculty and administration ranged from $600–2,500 (compared to the national average of $687 for all industries except for farm labor). Hardy argued for the pay increases, claiming increases would "give merited and much needed relief...[and] will be entirely justified by the increased good of the service." More buildings were added after appropriations of funds in 1907 and total expenditures for the campus reached $312,000. Even with the expansion, by 1910 space was limited, so the training school dropped the high school program, although it still taught the elementary and intermediate grades (7th and 8th grades). In 1914, of the 136 new students for the school year, 17 were from California counties (excluding San Diego), while 26 were from other states. This proportion would remain common throughout the school's history as the majority of its students were from the San Diego area.

== World War I ==
World War I had a large impact on the school. A newfound sense of patriotism had the administration require students to recite the Pledge of Allegiance as an entrance requirement to the school. The war also had an effect on enrollment as all of the male students gradually left the school to join the war efforts; in 1916 there were 421 total students, 382 in 1917, 172 in 1918 (including only one male student), and in 1919, 147 students. In addition to the students, some of the faculty members joined the military. Due to the decreased student enrollment, the remaining faculty had the opportunity to further their own training. On campus, both students and faculty worked with the Red Cross, organized bond drives, and sent packages to troops overseas.

During this period, Hardy pushed the notion of granting the school college status. In 1921, the California legislature made the school a four-year teacher's school, which placed it under the management of the State Department of Education. On July 28, 1921, the San Diego Normal School became San Diego State Teachers College (usually shortened to San Diego State College or SDS). With this ranking, the college could now grant certificates and degrees. Prior to the school's conversion, it had graduated 1,500 teachers, educated many of the San Diego children at its training school, and helped to expand the economic and cultural development of the city. Also in 1921, the legislature moved San Diego Junior College, that was a part of San Diego High School, to the college campus due to crowding issues. Administrators moved the junior college believing it would only overlap the same material taught at the teacher's school. The junior college remained with the school until 1947, when it became independent.

On June 30, 1923, the legislature allowed the college to begin granting Bachelor of Arts degrees, which included accountancy, agriculture, and industrial engineering. On July 1, 1927, the junior college courses became lower-division courses and on July 12, 1928, the State Board of Education granted the college the ability to offer credentials in secondary education with majors in English, history, chemistry, and the Romance languages.

== Move to current location ==
The Normal School was initially built for a maximum capacity of 600 students. Hardy proposed in 1922 building on a new campus at a 125-acre (51 ha) plot at Park Boulevard (near Balboa Park), which was rejected by San Diego voters. However, the California legislature authorized a move to a new site in 1925 if San Diego was willing to buy the old school building and provide a new site. The following year the Citizen's Advisory Committee, a 21-member committee led by Mayor John L. Bacon, initially recommended the northeast part of Balboa Park that would be located over 122 acres (49 ha), but the location was voted down by San Diego voters. In 1927, another location was selected, this time in Encanto, but was also voted down. In total, ten locations would be proposed before the final location was chosen. By June 1928, the Bell-Lloyd Investment Company offered 125 acres (51 ha) at Mission Palisades, $50,000, and a promise to build a road connecting the site to El Cajon Blvd. The site was located at the east side of Mission Valley, about 10 miles (16 km) away from the old site. The group proposed the site in hopes of it being the center of a new retail and housing development. Before the new site could be built, San Diego voters had to approve of buying the old site, which it did overwhelmingly on May 15, 1928. After the move to the new campus, the old Normal School building was used for Horace Mann Junior High and administrative offices. In 1955, it was demolished to make room for a new wing of an administrative building.

George B. McDougall was selected as the supervising architect and the State Department of Architecture for Public Buildings designed the new campus. The initial planned cost was $7.5 million. On October 7, 1929, classes were dismissed early so all current students could attend the groundbreaking held on that day. Pettifer & Hupt was selected as the construction firm, and it completed several buildings by September 1930. The first classes made up of 1,220 students were held at Montezuma Mesa in February 1931.

The Great Depression, although negative to the local economy, also benefited the San Diego State Teachers College, as the federal government made money available for construction projects in an attempt to stimulate the economy. For the campus, some of these construction projects included new buildings (such as a $500,000 stadium completed in 1936 and a $200,000 open air theater completed in 1941), facilities, and art works. Several federal programs were also created to give jobs to students and to increase financial aid.

...The idea that San Diego State College was a place of opportunity, a friendly place...where the individual student was the important, chief concern of the College.

— Walter R. Hepner, explaining his purpose as President

In June 1935, President Hardy retired and was replaced by Walter R. Hepner. The bell tower on campus was named in honor of Hardy in 1976. On September 15, 1935, as a result of the California legislature dropping "teachers" from the names of state colleges, San Diego State Teachers College became San Diego State College (SDSC). In 1935 the college began offering engineering courses. During that period, the college acquired $18,000 from the state for the purpose of purchasing an additional 94 acres (38 ha).

== World War II ==
Just as World War I had a significant impact on the college, World War II was pivotal in the college's history too. Within four days of the attack on Pearl Harbor, thirteen students withdrew from the college to join the military. The enrollment dropped from 2,077 students in 1940 to a low of 860 students (21% were men) in spring 1943. Faculty decreased to as low as 60 from 112 before the war had begun. Before the war was over, 3,500 SDSC graduates, students, former students, and faculty entered the armed forces, with 135 losing their lives. Not surprisingly for a city dominated by a naval base, a large majority joined the Navy. Others joined the Air Corps, participating in the Doolittle Raid over Japan and battles over the Philippines and the East Indies.

In 1942, the campus became a War Information Center, one of 140 in the nation. The center was established to boost civilian morale and practice air raid drills. Rationing on campus of sugar, gas, soft drinks, and paper became common throughout the war. Classes were cut back due to the limited staff and the courses were shifted to more scientific and technological emphasis. The majority of the sports were canceled during the war and various drives were held to increase supplies sent to troops.

As the war neared its end, enrollment increased, until it reached 2,000 students in 1946. Nearly half of these students were veterans from the war, and they received a monthly stipend to assist with housing and tuition costs. Sports and activities resumed to their prior levels and by the end of the 1940s, the faculty had expanded to 230 personnel and 40 part-time staff.

...exists in its present form because the people of our community and our state have recognized the tremendous importance of teaching and of the increased need for teachers of broad education and high professional competency. Its present program has developed, also, because of the demand and need for college education that is economically available to every high-school graduate of demonstrated ability regardless of occupational goal.

— Walter R. Hepner, at the school’s 15th year anniversary in 1947

In 1946, Hepner grouped the various disciplines into seven divisions: Education, Fine Arts, Humanities, Social Sciences, Life Sciences, Physical Sciences, and Health, Physical Education, and Recreation. In 1950, the college awarded its first master's degree, and by the end of the decade offered master's degrees in 38 areas. On May 23, 1947, Governor Earl Warren signed legislation making SDSC an official four-year liberal arts institution.

== Postwar changes and expansion ==
In 1952 President Hepner retired, and was replaced by Malcolm Love, who previously served as president of the University of Nevada (since 1950). At this point, the college had more than 4,800 students, 222 faculty members, offered 27 majors, had a budget of $2.01 million and contributed more than $14 million to the local San Diego economy.

By the end of the 1950s, the student population was over 10,000, placing it as the fourth largest California state institution and larger than 96% of the U.S.’s colleges and universities at the time. In 1957, entering freshmen scores on examinations were ranked in the top 10% of all universities in the U.S. In the following years, the college's scores also surpassed most of the other California state colleges. In 1957 the college became the first to use an identification number for each student, which was necessary to simplify handling of records, grades, and other tasks of the large number of students. To keep up with student expansion, the square footage of the buildings and classrooms was increased from 255,434 to 1,243,737.

In 1959, the school began offering classes at Central Union High School in El Centro as part of its Imperial Valley branch. The campus remained focused on teacher training until the mid-1970s. In 1960, the school became the first California state college to have an educational radio station, KPBS-FM.

Before World War II, less than 25% of the faculty had doctorates, and in an attempt to reach university status for the school, the 1956 Statement of General Policy on Employment of Faculty stipulated that incoming faculty had to have their doctorates (or soon receive one) in order to be hired. By the end of the 1950s, 56% of permanent faculty had doctorates. By the beginning of 1965 this had increased to 68%.

During the Red Scare, psychology professor Harry C. Steinmetz was accused of being a Communist. San Diego representatives persuaded the California legislature along with Governor Earl Warren to attempt to remove him from his teaching position. After the State Board of Education was unable to get an answer from Steinmetz about whether or not he was a Communist, he was dismissed on February 5, 1954. He attempted to be reinstated but never was even after the legislation that had been developed during the Red Scare was later deemed unconstitutional.

On July 1, 1961, as a result of the Donahue Act, SDSC became a part of the California State College system which included a new set of regulations for the school, along with a statewide board of trustees and a chancellor. The school continued to grow, with a population of 10,700 in 1960 and 25,500 in 1970. The San Diego county administrator Fred Morey reflected on so many graduates being hired by the county: "We would find it difficult to keep the County running without the help of San Diego State."

John F. Kennedy, then the U.S. president, gave the graduation commencement address at Aztec Bowl in front of 40,000 people on June 6, 1963. Kennedy was given an honorary doctorate degree in law at the ceremony, making San Diego State the first in California to award an honorary doctorate degree. To commemorate his visit, the campus added his portrait to the campus library collection and a granite stone marker placed where his helicopter landed (California Historical Landmark #798). In April 2008, a plaque that commemorated his visit was stolen and has yet to be recovered. On May 29, 1964 Martin Luther King Jr. spoke at the Open Air Theater about proposed legislation in improving rights for African Americans.

In 1965, San Diego State began offering a doctorate in chemistry in a joint effort with University of California, San Diego. By 1991, the campus had eight different doctorate programs. Research became a vital practice of the faculty during the 1960s. By 1965, more than 200 books had been authored by SDSC faculty. Federal research grants increased from $398,202 in 1961 to $1,184,387 in 1967. Faculty research included medical and scientific research, teacher enhancement, Peace Corps training, and a review of nursing curricula.

In 1966, the Carnegie Corporation named President Love one of the best college Presidents in the country. President Love changed the structure of the college, developing its divisions into professional schools, which would allow them to be accredited. The schools were developed into colleges, which increased the possibility of SDSC of becoming a university. He reflected on San Diego State's progress in a Time magazine article: "Though we are called a college, we are in deed and in fact a university."

Throughout the late 1960s and early 1970s there were numerous protests, sit-ins, and radical changes in traditions among the students. Author Raymond Starr called this period "...the liveliest, most colorful, and most challenging in State’s history." Students mainly protested racism and the war in Vietnam. In March 1970, 600 students held a week-long sit-in in protest of the decision of the campus leaders not to rehire four radical instructors. Protests expanded to the presence of Reserve Officers' Training Corps (ROTC), military recruiters, the Police Community Relations Training Institute, among others. Significant speakers visited the campus during the time including Cesar Chavez, Jane Fonda, Angela Davis, Donald Freed, Joan Baez, and Jerry Brown. On April 20, 1972, 75 demonstrators took ROTC students hostage while they were taking an examination in the Business Administration and Math building. Although there was some violence, the students were released peacefully. On May 3, 1972, 35 protesters (later growing to 2,000) smashed windows of the Administration building and burned copies of The Daily Aztec, the student newspaper. Protesters eventually entered the locked building and set fires on the first floor, and moved on to Aztec Center to set more fires and break windows. The mayhem resulted in six injuries and several thousand dollars in damages. On May 24, 1972, a bomb exploded in Tarastec Hall, injuring Lawrence Jackson, an African American student. A group of African American students marched on campus to show support for Jackson.

The first women's studies program in the United States was established in 1970 at the college, after a year of intense organizing of women's consciousness raising groups, rallies, petition circulating, and operating unofficial or experimental classes and presentations before seven committees and assemblies.

In early 1971, President Love retired. With the extraordinary growth of students, faculty and facilities, there were plans for new library to be named in honor of him, which was dedicated in May 1971. After a brief unsuccessful nomination of Walter Waetjen to replace Dr. Love, and Academic Vice President Walker acting as president for 1971–72, Brage Golding became the new president. He served from 1972 to 1977, and although he did not implement any mainstream changes as prior presidents had, he was instrumental in bringing in qualified administrators who would improve the school during its upcoming years. He worked to establish the San Diego History Research Center for collecting materials on the city's history and established the Educational Growth Opportunities program which offered classes for older people. At Golding's leaving of the university, one person commented: "By the end of the five-year administration, San Diego State University had grown into the institution implied by its name. This was the mark that Brage Golding left on San Diego State University."

Golding left to lead Kent State University, and with a brief intermission of Academic Vice President Trevor Colbourn serving as president, Thomas B. Day became the sixth president in 1978. When Proposition 13 passed, the school faced budget issues and Day proposed abolishing some departments, combining others, and laying off approximately 80 faculty members. However, budget cuts were deemed not necessary, and on April 8, 1980, Day again proposed cutting 115 faculty members and four departments due to foreseeing upcoming budget cuts; on May 16, 1980, he recanted his comments.

President Love had fought hard throughout his tenure to increase SDSC's ranking from a college to a university. In 1972, the California legislature approved the renaming of the school to "California State University, San Diego". San Diego State officials were still not happy with the name, and on January 1, 1974, it was renamed to "San Diego State University" (SDSU), its current name.

== Modern history ==
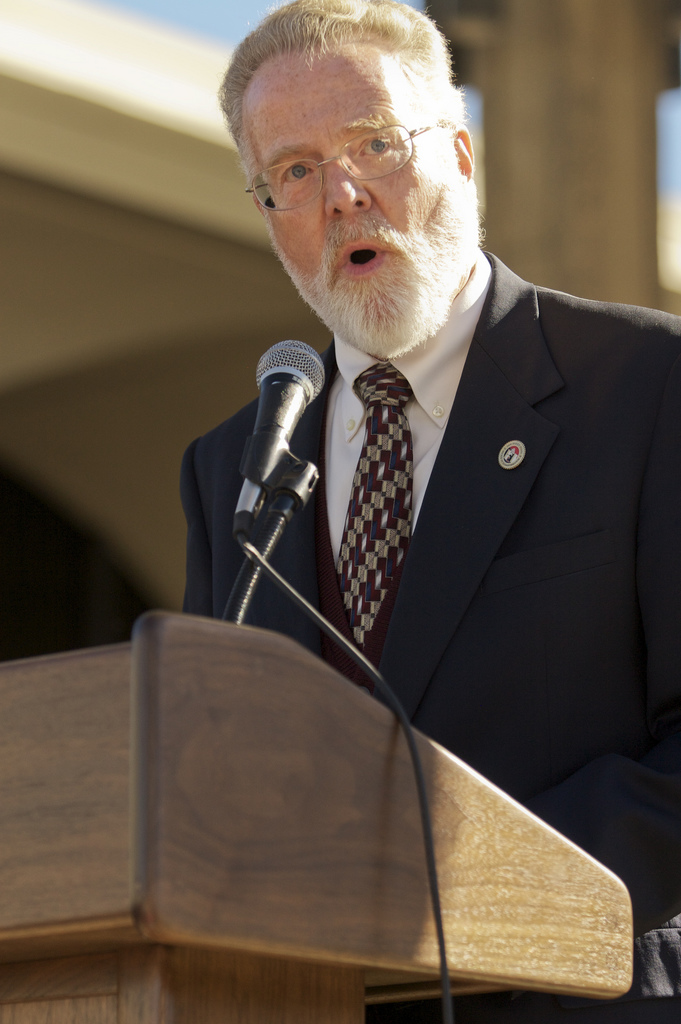
Stephen Weber, SDSU's former president, speaking in December 2007

In 1987, the school reached its peak attendance with 35,945 students, resulting in SDSU being the largest university in California and 10th in the nation. Due to the overwhelming number of students and available facilities and majors, the California State University Board of Trustees decided to limit enrollment to 33,000. However, in 1993, enrollment dropped to 26,800, the lowest attendance since 1973 as a result of the budget crisis of 1991.

In 1984, the California Higher Education Journal ranked SDSU as first among the CSU campuses, and U.S. News & World Report ranked the school among the top five comprehensive universities in the west in 1983, third in 1985, and in the top fifteen in 1989. In the 1980s, the College of Business' School of Accountancy was the only accredited accountancy program in California. Throughout the decade students scored the highest score on the Certified Public Accountancy (CPA) exam three times, and by 1990 was second in the nation (after the University of Texas, Austin) for graduates passing the CPA exam.

In January 1987, Playboy ranked SDSU as the 3rd best party school in the nation, which appalled some administrators, and amused students. The ranking was determined on a number of factors including the education offered at the university, social opportunities, the male–female ratio, and off-campus activities located near the campus. Some students feared that the ranking would diminish the quality of their degree. In 2002 it dropped to tenth place, and in 2005 was included again without a specific rank, before jumping to fifth place in 2006.

The Graduate School of Public Health was first offered to students in 1981, and was one of only 24 accredited schools of public health in the nation and the only one in the CSU system in 1995. President Day considered it the major achievement of his administration, and it provided training in hospitals, public health agencies, health maintenance organizations, ambulatory care, and mental health facilities.

In the 1990s, the College of Business was the fourth largest undergraduate program in the U.S. By 1989–90 SDSU was granting over 1,100 Master's degrees and 10 doctoral degrees a year.

As a result of the California state government proposed budget cuts to the CSU campuses, 1991 to 1994 at SDSU were marked by a long period of university budget stress, faculty unrest/layoffs, and student protests against SDSU fee increases and class cuts.

Spring of 1991 brought large fee increases and budget cuts by the governor and state legislature to the California State University (CSU) and University of California (UC) systems impacted SDSU in a unique way. While other schools in the systems chose an across the board approach on campus, the president of SDSU at the time, Thomas Day, chose to use a "deep and narrow" approach to program cuts. The result were largest student marches and protests since the Vietnam war.

Yet again in Spring 1992, the CSU and UC systems were facing another round of severe budget cuts and dramatic student fee increases by the state government. Still a second time, SDSU President Thomas Day took the same deep and narrow approach for budget cuts for SDSU, but this time proposed elimination of not only full-time faculty professors, but of entire majors such as Aerospace Engineering. In an attempt to alleviate fears of students in those majors, a large meeting by President Day was planned in the student center with hundreds of students and teachers. However, meeting quickly turned angry and chaotic with an overcapacity crowd pressing against the glass windows outside. Following the meeting, students feeling betrayed a 2nd time after 1991, about a dozen students held a temporary occupation of President Day's office. This occupation led to a 24-hour vigil in front of the Administration building, summer student bus trips to the state legislature in Sacramento, large campus student voter registration drive, and further student marches and protests in the Fall 1992. Under heavy student, teacher, and public pressure, the conclusion of these events ended with CSU Chancellor Barry Munitz eventually reversing President Day's deep and narrow approach, saving the majors and programs in Fall 1992.

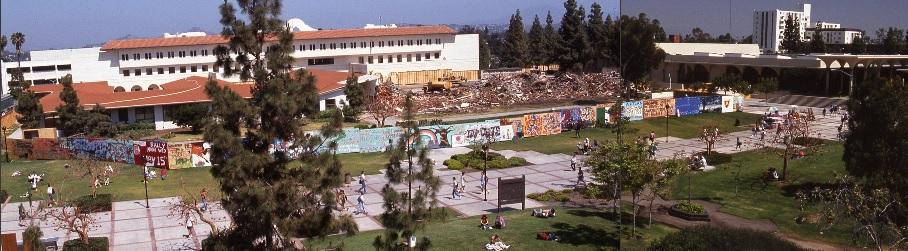
Early picture of "Student Free Speech Wall" during protests. Spring 1991.

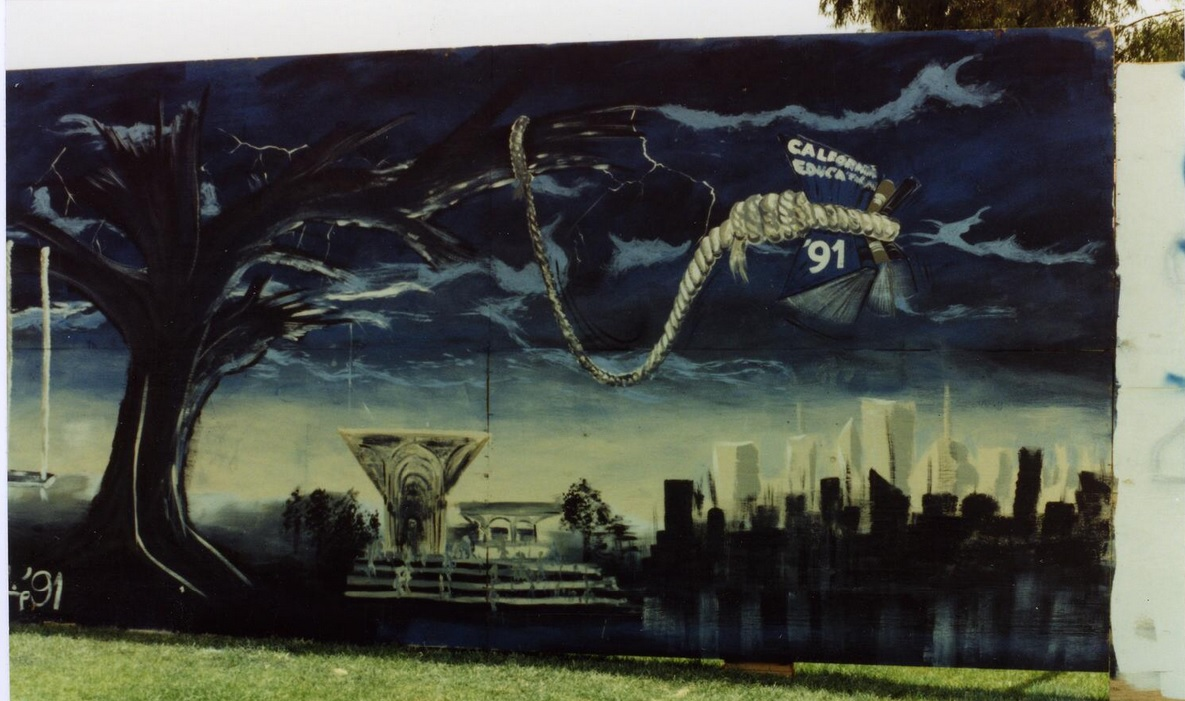
Close up of one of the student political art paintings on wall. Spring 1991.

Central and parallel to the SDSU student protest movement was an 8 foot high wooden construction fence that encircled a new campus building. Students quickly put up protest messages, paintings, and cartoons urging students to rally, vote, and challenge the school president. Citing a need to "clean up" the campus during graduation of 1991, President Day attempted to paint over the now symbolic construction fence wall. The night before the attempted wall paint over by President Day, a large police force arrested eight students peacefully sitting in front of the wall. The next morning, word quickly gathered on campus about the arrests and dozens of student rushed to sit in front of the wall ultimately stopping the painters.

In May 1994, the student government dedicated a permanent memorial to the wall in Pfiefer Lounge (later a Starbucks and now the new Student Center) a few yards from the wall's edge. The student memorial to the protests included the wall painting of President Day's head in a guillotine.

When President Day retired in July 1996, SDSU's incoming freshman had a 38% success rate in graduating from the university within six years. Day was replaced by the university's seventh president, Stephen Weber. Just one month later, on August 15, a 36-year-old graduate student pulled out a handgun while defending his thesis and killed three professors. The student pleaded guilty and is serving a life sentence prison term. On August 23, 2003, a memorial was dedicated to the three professors that included three trees along with a set of three tables and benches.

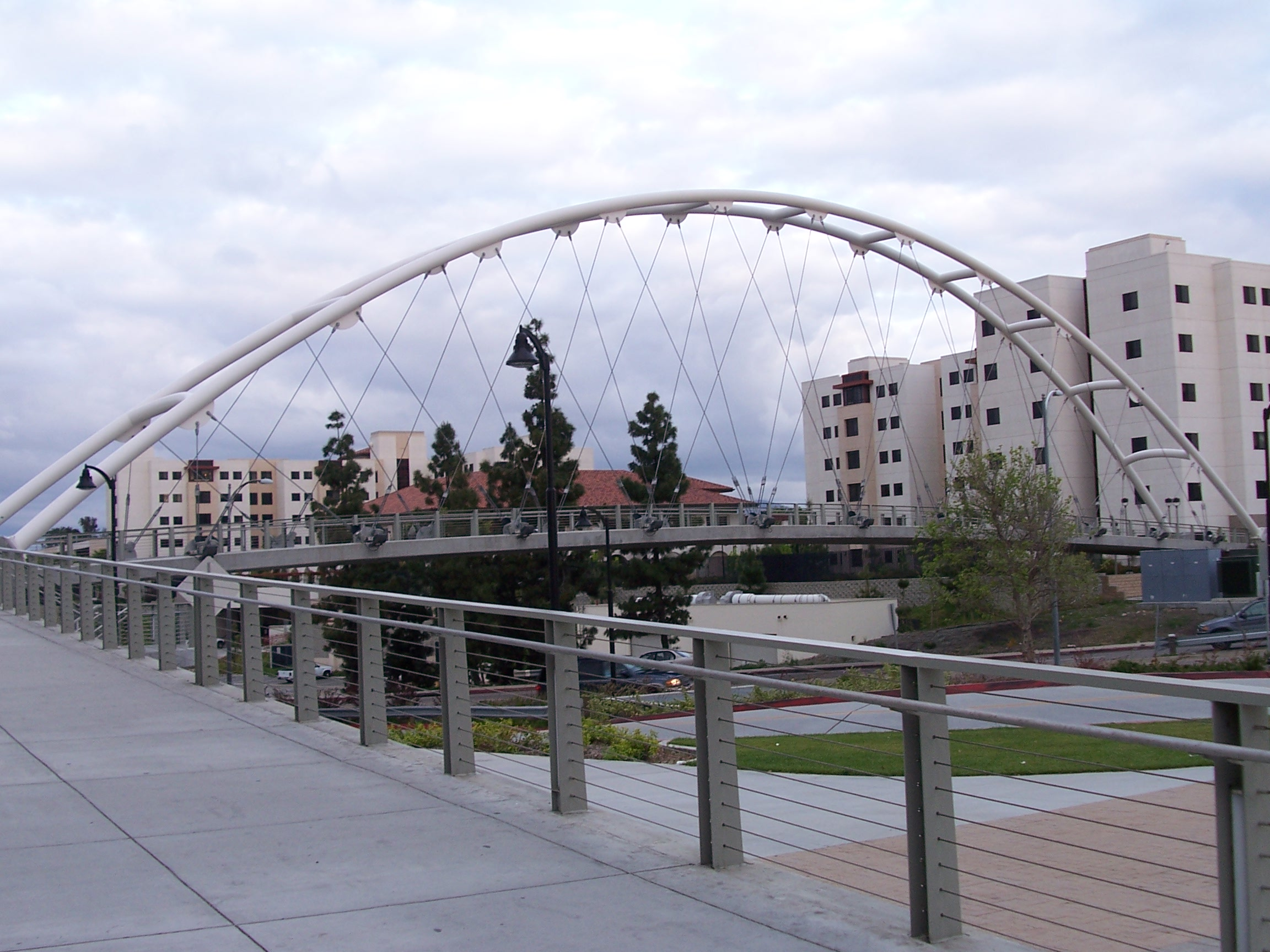
Pedestrian bridge completed in 2003 that connects dorms to main campus

On July 10, 2005, a new trolley station opened on the SDSU campus, after construction began in 1999. The station connected students and faculty with other areas in San Diego county and helped to combat the low availability of parking around campus. The $103 million station was just one of the university's several construction projects that occurred in the 2000s. Starting in the late 1990s, a $500 million College Community Redevelopment Project led to the development of the $8.5 million Piedra del Sol Apartments, the $14.3 million Fraternity Row, and future developments of a $15 million Sorority Row, a $150 million Paseo retail, office, and apartment project, as well as a $125 million research and office park. In 2003, a pedestrian bridge opened, connecting several of the dorms to the main campus. In the same year, the campus's most technologically advanced and largest classroom (capable of holding 500 students) was completed. Through 2008 and 2009, the campus began work on constructing a new alumni center, expanding Aztec Center, and modifying Storm Hall and Nasitir Hall to add more office and classroom space.

In June 2007, SDSU was deemed the number one small research university in the nation. The ranking was determined based on faculty productivity, honorary awards, publications in journals, and number of research grants received. At any point, the campus usually has around 800 studies in progress in various fields. A 2007 study revealed that the campus has an economic impact of $2.4 billion on the San Diego region. Due to projections of current and future growth, the study indicated that the school's economic impact is expected to increase to $4.5 billion by 2025.

On May 6, 2008, the Drug Enforcement Administration (DEA) announced the arrest of 96 individuals, of whom 75 were San Diego State University students, on a variety of drug charges in a multiple-month narcotics sting called Operation Sudden Fall. Two kilograms of cocaine were seized, along with 50 pounds of marijuana, 350 Ecstasy pills, hash oil, methamphetamine, other drug paraphernalia, three guns, and $60,000 in cash. Several months after the May 6 announcement, it was reported that the majority of the defendants had pleaded guilty to the felony charges. The defendants were then either placed on probation or were required to enter drug diversion programs. Other defendants only received citations or had their cases dismissed.

In 2010, after 15 years as president, Weber announced his upcoming retirement for the following year. Weber was credited for improving the graduation rate; in 2003, 66% of freshmen were graduating within six years. In May 2011, University of Maryland, Baltimore County senior vice president Elliot Hirshman was named by the CSU Board of Trustees to replace Weber. Hirshman assumed his appointed role as president in July.

After the departure of the San Diego Chargers for Los Angeles in 2017, SDSU endeavored to gain control of the city stadium (then called Qualcomm Stadium) and surrounding city property, which is just across the freeway from the main campus and where SDSU football games are played. The proposal, called SDSU West, was put to city voters in November 2017 where it won approval by 54% of those voting, easily beating out a competing commercial proposal called SoccerCity. Negotiations began for SDSU to purchase the property from the city of San Diego. On May 29, 2020, the city council gave conceptual approval to sell 135 acres, including the stadium, to San Diego State for $88 million. SDSU hopes to break ground for a new 35,000-seat stadium in August 2020. The stadium will house SDSU football games as well other NCAA games, professional soccer and special events such as concerts. The entire $3.5 billion project, which includes housing, office and retail space, hotels, and 80 acres of parks and open space including a 34-acre river park on city property, will be rolled out in phases over 15 years.
