= List of cemeteries in San Diego =

This list of cemeteries in San Diego includes currently operating, historical (closed for new interments), and defunct (graves abandoned or removed) cemeteries, columbaria, and mausolea in San Diego County, California. It does not include pet cemeteries. Selected interments are given for notable people.

- Mt. Olivet Cemetery, San Diego
- Cypress View Mausoleum
- Dearborn Memorial Park, Poway
- El Camino Memorial Park, San Diego
- El Cajon Cemetery, El Cajon
- Fort Rosecrans National Cemetery, Point Loma, San Diego
- Glen Abbey Memorial Park
- Greenwood Memorial Park
- Haven of Rest, Julian
- Holy Cross Cemetery
- La Vista Memorial Park and Mortuary, National City
- Miramar National Cemetery
- Mission San Antonio de Pala Asistencia Cemetery, Pala Indian Reservation
- Mission Santa Ysabel Asistencia Cemetery, Santa Ysabel
- Mount Hope Cemetery, San Diego
- Oak Hill Memorial Park
- Oceanview Cemetery, Oceanside
- Old Mission San Luis Rey Cemetery, Oceanside
- San Marcos Cemetery, Escondido
- San Pasqual Cemetery, San Pasqual
- Singing Hills Memorial Park, El Cajon
- Valley Center Cemetery, Valley Center

== See also ==
- List of cemeteries in California
