= Daily Journal Corporation =

American publishing & technology company

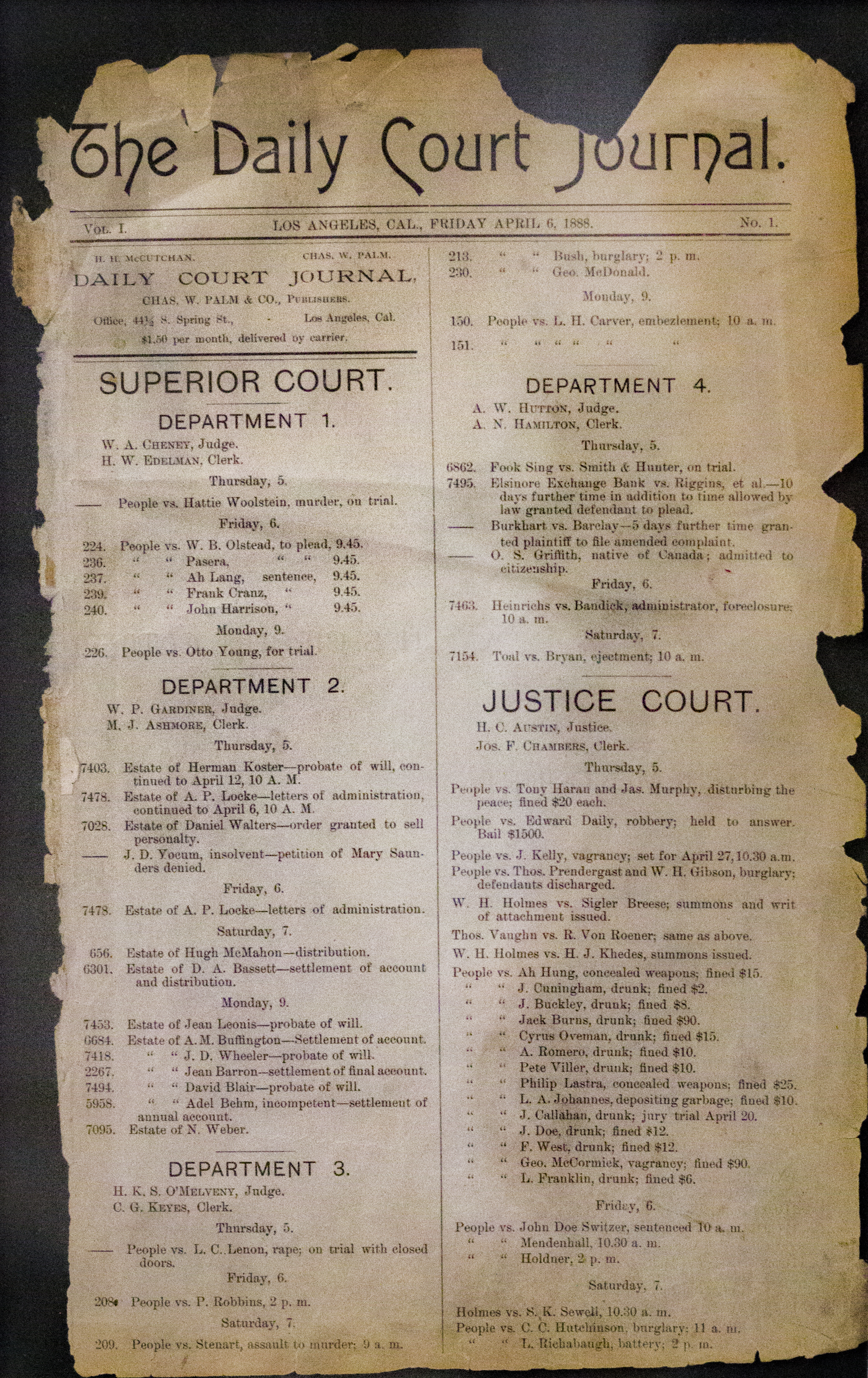
- The Daily Court Journal, published Friday, April 6, 1888
- Type: Public
- Traded as: Nasdaq: DJCO
- Industry: Publishing and Technology
- Founded: 1886; 140 years ago
- Headquarters: Los Angeles, California, United States
- Key people: Steven Myhill-Jones (chairman & CEO)
- Revenue: US$48.7 million (FY 2019)
- Number of employees: 250 (as of 2020)
- Subsidiaries: Journal Technologies
- Website: www.dailyjournal.com

Daily Journal Corporation is an American publishing company and technology company headquartered in Los Angeles, California. The company has offices in the California cities of Corona, Oakland, Riverside, Sacramento, San Diego, San Francisco, San Jose, and Santa Ana, as well as in Denver, Colorado; Logan, Utah; Phoenix, Arizona; and Melbourne, Australia. Since being led by Charles T. Munger, its newspapers have focused greatly on reporting about the U.S. legal system.

== Governance ==
The Daily Journal Corporation has been publicly traded since 1987 on the NASDAQ under DJCO. Its chairman is Steven Myhill-Jones.

== Publishing business ==
The original newspaper, The Daily Court Journal (Los Angeles), began publication in 1888. Charles T. Munger, who was also vice chairman of Berkshire Hathaway, purchased the paper in 1977; through a series of acquisitions and organic growth, Munger built it into a group of newspapers and websites that provide information on the legal industry, real estate and general business. The company publishes ten newspapers in California and Arizona. Its largest publications are the Los Angeles Daily Journal and the San Francisco Daily Journal.

The Daily Journal newspapers have won numerous awards for its journalism, with the Los Angeles Press Club in 2003 noting that the Los Angeles Daily Journal was "the most award-winning newspaper in Los Angeles with the sole exception of the Los Angeles Times."

Newspapers

- Business Journal (Riverside, California)
- Daily Commerce (Los Angeles, California)
- The Daily Recorder (Sacramento, California)
- The Daily Transcript (San Diego, California)
- The Inter-City Express (Oakland, California)
- Los Angeles Daily Journal (Los Angeles, California)
- Orange County Reporter (Santa Ana, California)
- San Francisco Daily Journal (San Francisco, California)
- San Jose Post-Record (San Jose, California)
- The Record Reporter (Phoenix, Arizona)

=== Advertising and newspaper representative ===
The Daily Journal's publications carry commercial advertising, and most also contain public notice advertising. Commercial advertising consists of display and classified advertising and the employment advertising marketplace. Public notice advertising consists of many types of legal notices required by law to be published in an adjudicated newspaper of general circulation, including notices of death, fictitious business names, trustee sale notices, individual name changes and notices of governmental hearings. The major types of public notice advertisers are real estate–related businesses and trustees, governmental agencies, attorneys and businesses or individuals filing fictitious business name statements.

A fictitious business name web site, www.DBAstore.com, enables individuals to send their statements to the company for filing and publication. www.LegalAdStore.com, enables attorneys and individuals to send probate, civil, corporate, public sale and other types of public notices to the company. www.CaPublicnotices.com displays Public Notices for different communities throughout the state.

=== California Newspaper Service Bureau ===
"CNSB", a division of the company, is a statewide newspaper representative specializing since 1934 in public notice advertising. CNSB places public notices and other forms of advertising with adjudicated newspapers of general circulation elsewhere in the state beyond The Daily Journal.

== Technology business ==
Journal Technologies, Inc. is a wholly owned subsidiary of the company. It consists of the combined operations of Sustain Technologies, Inc., established in the mid-1980s and acquired by the Daily Journal Corporation in 1999; New Dawn Technologies, Inc., acquired in 2012; and ISD Technologies, Inc., acquired in 2013.

Journal Technologies makes software for trial and appellate courts and agencies related to court systems, including prosecutorial agencies, public defenders, probation departments and pretrial offices, throughout the United States, Canada and Australia.

Journal Technologies has established itself in the market with a browser-based case management system that is a configurable business processing engine as the centerpiece for document management and e-filing.

== See also ==
- Economy of California
- List of California companies
