= San Diego Daily Transcript =

The San Diego Daily Transcript, also known as The Daily Transcript, is an online newspaper covering business news in and around San Diego, California. Its print origins date to 1882, when it was called the National City Record; it took on its The Daily Transcript name in 1886. The original publisher was William Burgess.

It was considered official newspaper of record for San Diego, which would lead to its having a "bid board" where public notice would be printed of government contract work. As a consequence, The Daily Transcript became, in the words of one account of its history, "the business community's go-to publication for industry news and listings." By 2004, some 2.8 million copies were printed over the course of each year.

It was one of the first newspapers to have an online presence, the San Diego Source, which was launched in 1994 and existed for two decades. By the mid-2010s, the paper had 6,000 paying web subscribers as compared to 1,500 subscribers to the print edition. But times were tough all over for newspapers – even more so in this case because the online posting of government bid information took away much of its readership – and in 2015, The Daily Transcript was scheduled to close.

Instead, parts of it were bought by the Los Angeles–based Daily Journal Corporation, and carried on in a lesser way in an online form, but the original San Diego Source online entity was not part of the deal.
