= Joan Kroc =

American philanthropist (1928–2003)

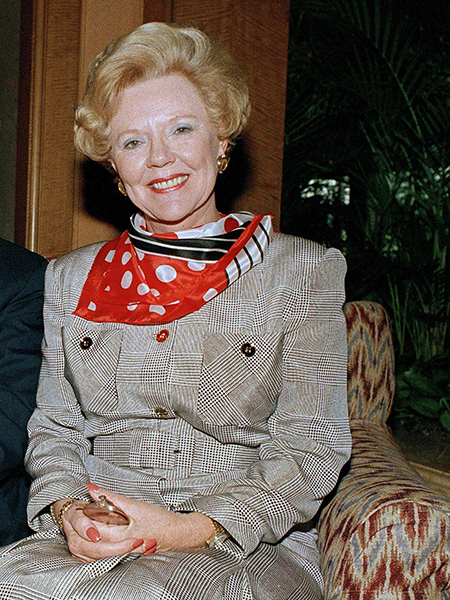
- Joan B. Kroc in 1987
- Born: Joan Beverly Mansfield; August 27, 1928; West St. Paul, Minnesota, U.S.
- Died: October 12, 2003 (aged 75); Rancho Santa Fe, California, U.S.
- Resting place: El Camino Memorial Park; Sorrento Valley, San Diego, California
- Spouses: Rawland F. Smith (m. 1945; div. 1969) Ray Kroc (m. 1969; died 1984)
- Children: 1

Joan Beverly Kroc (née Mansfield, previously Smith; August 27, 1928 – October 12, 2003), also known as Joni, was an American philanthropist and the third wife of McDonald's CEO Ray Kroc.

== Early life ==
Joan Beverly Mansfield was born on August 27, 1928, in West St. Paul, Minnesota. Her father, Charles Smart Mansfield, was a store keeper and later a railroad telegraph operator and salesman.

== Marriage and family ==
In 1945, Mansfield married Rawland F. "Rollie" Smith, a Navy veteran who would become a McDonald's franchisee, eventually owning three stores in Rapid City, South Dakota. The couple's only child, a daughter named Linda, was born the following year.

Mansfield met McDonald's Corp. founder Ray Kroc, who was 26 years her senior, while playing the organ at the Criterion Restaurant in St. Paul, Minnesota, in 1957. Ray said in his autobiography that he "was stunned by her blonde beauty". They were both married at the time. They met again at a McDonald's conference in 1969 and, within six months, they divorced their spouses and married each other. Following Kroc's death in 1984, she inherited his fortune.

== Philanthropy ==
External videos
- Ray and Joan, 57:59, Lisa Napoli discusses her book on C-SPAN

In 2002, Kroc Center, a large Salvation Army community center that she helped fund—to the tune of $87 million—opened to the public. She later bequeathed an additional $1.6 billion to open Salvation Army Kroc Centers across the nation, the largest one-time gift ever recorded. Several institutions in the San Diego area are named after her, including the think tank Joan B. Kroc Institute for Peace and Justice and the Joan B. Kroc School of Peace Studies at the University of San Diego, the St. Vincent de Paul Joan Kroc Center for the Homeless (part of Father Joe's Villages—San Diego's largest organization helping the homeless) in downtown and the Kroc–Copley Animal Shelter in the Morena District. Additionally, Joan established and endowed University of Notre Dame's Joan B. Kroc Institute for International Peace Studies. Kroc preferred to give donations anonymously, but recipient organizations often insisted on publicizing her gifts, hoping to attract new donors.

As the Padres owner, Kroc started Major League Baseball's first employee-assistance program for players and staff with drug problems.

Kroc was also politically active. In 1985, she spent millions of dollars in support of nuclear disarmament, which included reprinting the book Missile Envy by Helen Caldicott, as well as publishing ads in major newspapers calling for disarmament. She anonymously gifted a Paul Conrad sculpture depicting a nuclear mushroom cloud, Chain Reaction, to the city of Santa Monica, where it still sits today. Because of her public no-nukes work, Cal Thomas, a conservative syndicated columnist, called her a "McNut".

Kroc is affectionately known by the citizens of Grand Forks, North Dakota, and East Grand Forks, Minnesota, as the "Angel" because of her anonymous $15 million donation to assist the cities after a devastating flood occurred there in 1997. She was revealed as the source of the funds after reporters tracked down ownership of the jet that she used to fly into the area to survey the damage.

After her death in 2003, it was announced that Kroc had left the majority of her estate to the Salvation Army for the purpose of building recreation centers across the US. Another of her major donations was $225 million to National Public Radio (NPR) including $5 million to her local public radio station, San Diego's KPBS.

== Death and legacy ==
Kroc died of brain cancer on October 12, 2003, in Rancho Santa Fe, California, at the age of 75. She was cremated and most of her remains were entombed at the El Camino Memorial Park in Sorrento Valley, San Diego.

Her will included significant bequests for a number of organizations:

- $1.5 billion (equivalent to $3 billion in 2025) for the Salvation Army
- $200 million (equivalent to $395 million in 2025) for National Public Radio
- $50 million (equivalent to $99 million in 2025) for the University of San Diego's Joan B. Kroc Institute for Peace and Justice
- $50 million (equivalent to $99 million in 2025) for the University of Notre Dame's Joan B. Kroc Institute for International Peace Studies
- $20 million (equivalent to $40 million in 2025) for the San Diego Hospice & Palliative Care, which was in addition to the $18.5 million she donated to build the institution during her life.

== In popular culture ==
The biography Ray & Joan: The Man Who Made The McDonald's Fortune and The Woman Who Gave it All Away, published by Dutton in 2016, and written by Lisa Napoli, examines the Krocs' relationship.

Kroc is portrayed by actress Linda Cardellini in the 2016 American biographical drama film The Founder.

== See also ==
- Women in baseball
- List of female Major League Baseball principal owners
