= El Camino Memorial Park =

Cemetery in Sorrento Valley, California, USA

Coordinates: 32.8931°N 117.1876°W

- Interactive map of El Camino Memorial Park

Details
- Established: 1960
- Location: Sorrento Valley, San Diego, California
- Country: United States
- Type: Public
- Size: 220-acre (0.89 km^{2})

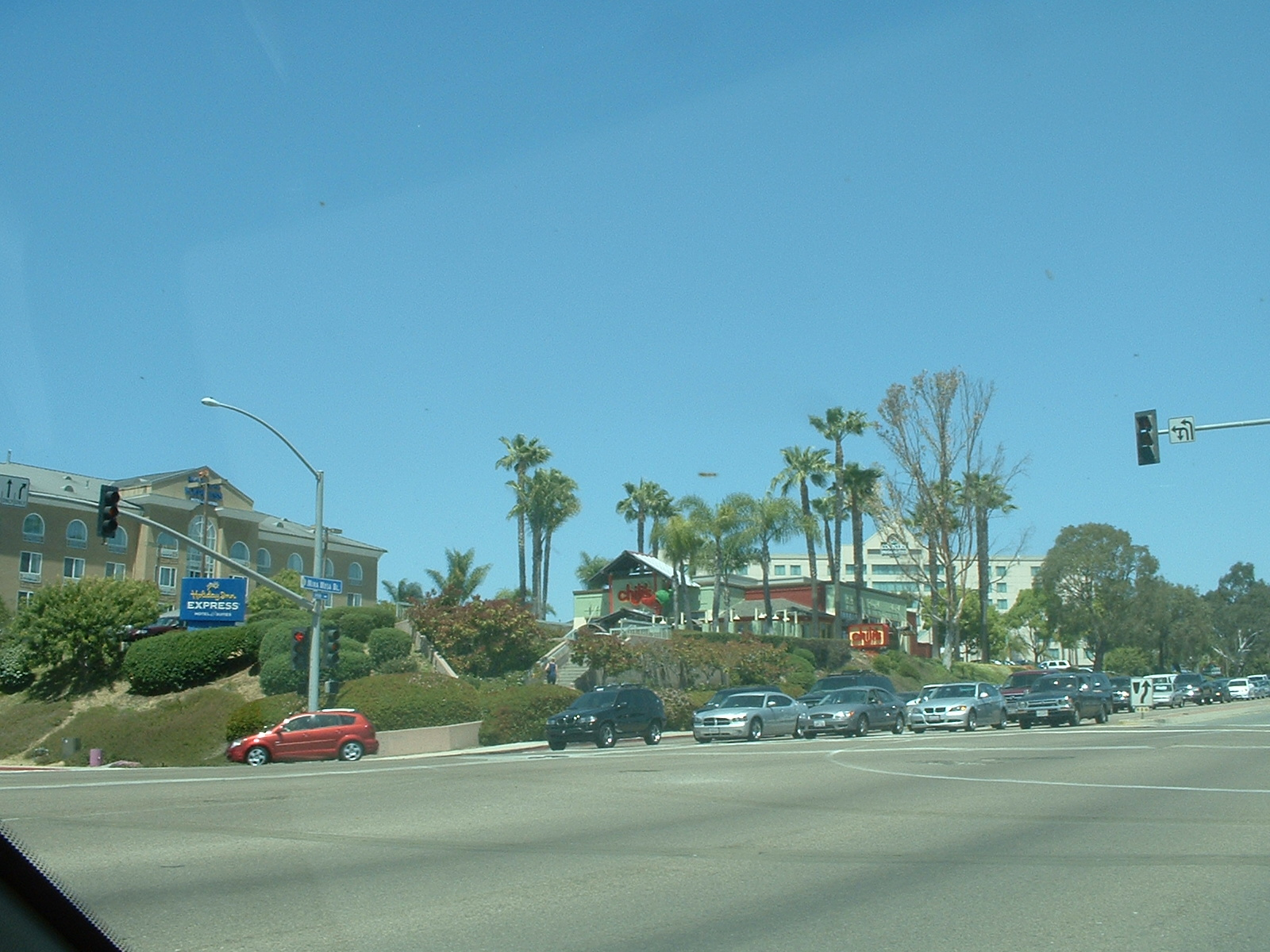
Sorrento Valley, San Diego, CA, USA - panoramio

El Camino Memorial Park is a cemetery in the Sorrento Valley neighborhood of San Diego, California. Founded in 1960, it is a 220-acre (0.89 km^{2}) property. The cemetery is noted for being the final resting site for Jonas Salk as well as several members of the well-known Kroc family.

== Notable interments ==
- Jonas Salk (1914–1995), medical researcher, discoverer of the polio vaccine
- Ray Ceresino (1929–2015), ice hockey player
- Kazimierz Deyna (1947–1989), Polish footballer (until 2012)
- Billy Daniels (1915–1988), singer
- Joseph Coors Sr. (1917–2003), COO of Coors Brewing Company and grandson of the founder, personal advisor to president Ronald Reagan
- Cedric Montgomery Durst (1896–1971), professional baseball player
- Preston Foster (1900–1970), songwriter, guitarist and Emmy nominated actor
- Dorothy Kelly (1894–1966), actress (also known as Dorothy O'Kelly)
- Ray Kroc (1902–1984), founding partner of McDonald's, owner of San Diego Padres baseball team
- Joan Kroc (1928–2003), wife of Ray Kroc, humanitarian
- Violet La Plante (1908–1984), actress, sister of actress Laura La Plante
- Todd Loren (1960–1992), (real name Stuart Shapiro), comic book publisher, founder of Revolutionary Comics
- Maria Goeppert Mayer (1906–1972), physicist and Nobel Prize winner
- James Mulvaney (1922–2010), investment banker, businessman, and lawyer
- William Nierenberg (1919–2000), scientist, member of the Manhattan Project
- Patti Page (1927–2013), singer and actress
- Charles Alan Pownall (1887–1979) WWII Naval Admiral, the last military governor of Guam.
- Allard Roen (1921–2008, Managing Director of casinos and resorts in Las Vegas, Nevada, and Carlsbad, California.
- Pete Rozelle (1926–1996), commissioner of the National Football League from 1960 to 1989
- Milburn Stone (1904–1980), Emmy award-winning film and television actor
- Lee Shippey (1884–1969), author and journalist
- Paul Trousdale (1915–1990), real estate developer.
- Barbara Werle (1928–2013), actress

== See also ==
- Cemeteries of San Diego
