= 1996 San Diego State University shooting =

1996 school shooting in San Diego, California

Coordinates: 32.7776°N 117.0706°W

- Location: San Diego, California, United States
- Date: August 15, 1996 c. 2:05 P.M.
- Attack type: School shooting, triple-murder
- Weapon: 9mm Taurus PT92 handgun
- Deaths: 3
- Injuries: 0
- Perpetrator: Frederick Martin Davidson
- Motive: Paranoid delusion of conspiracies

The San Diego State University shooting was a school shooting that occurred at the San Diego State University (SDSU) engineering building on August 15, 1996, in San Diego, California. Three professors were killed by master's degree student Frederick Martin Davidson.

== Shooting ==
Davidson, the three faculty members, and three other engineering students assembled in the classroom shortly before 2:00 p.m. The three students were there to support Davidson, and to witness a master's thesis defense. Liang stood, formally introduced Davidson, stated the purpose of the meeting, and sat back down. Davidson then handed Liang a printout of an e-mail, from a prospective employer who was interested in hiring Davidson, that stated that his future employment with the company hinged on a successful master's thesis defense. Without time for comment from Liang, and without saying anything himself, Davidson removed a 9mm handgun from a first aid box on the wall and started firing. He hit Liang first, killing him while he was still seated at the faculty table. Lowrey and Lyrintzis were also hit. However, Lowrey tried to escape out the only main access door to the room. There were other doors in the room, but only one door led out to the hallway, and other parts of the third floor of the Engineering building.

Davidson was between the main door and the faculty table, and shot Lowrey several times; he died on the floor in the main doorway. Lyrintzis fled from the main door and Davidson, into an adjoining classroom, and hid under a table. After killing Lowrey, Davidson reloaded another magazine into the handgun, and pursued Lyrintzis into the other room. There, he shot and killed Lyrintzis while the latter was still under the desk. Overall, Davidson fired 23 rounds, with 16 rounds hitting the professors.

The three students attending the thesis defense were not shot, and escaped without injury. One of the students made it out through the main doorway, and notified the third-floor students and faculty to evacuate. Davidson later commented that he was not angry at the students, and had no intention of killing them.

After the shooting, Davidson himself called 9-1-1. SDSU police officers arrived to find Davidson in the third-floor hallway still holding the handgun. He was reportedly sobbing and begging for police to kill him. He soon surrendered to university police without further incident. Davidson had intended to kill himself after the shootings. Davidson had left a murder-suicide note in the hallway for the police to find, detailing the location of evidence and computer files in his house.

=== Victims ===
- Chen Liang, age 32
- O. Preston Lowrey III, age 44
- Constantinos Lyrintzis, age 36

== Perpetrator and motives ==
Frederick Martin Davidson (born 1960), aged 36 at the time of the shooting, was a mechanical engineering graduate student at SDSU. On the day of the shooting, he was to defend his master's thesis in front of his victims. Chen Liang was his graduate adviser. San Diego Police Department investigations after the shooting determined that Davidson made advance plans for the shooting by slipping into the room where he was to defend his thesis at 10:00 a.m., and hiding the handgun and five extra magazines of ammunition in a first aid kit. Each magazine contained 15 rounds of ammunition.

Davidson believed that the three professors and the entire engineering department were involved in a conspiracy against him. Davidson's thesis had been rejected once already, and he may have believed that the faculty would reject his thesis again. Davidson also mentioned to his landlord of two years, Charles Brashear, that he was resentful towards Liang because Liang gave him little credit for working long hours in the laboratory, and "busy work" that had nothing to do with his thesis. Davidson's lack of employment was also a motive, as he felt Constantinos Lyrintzis was preventing him from finding work. In addition, O. Preston Lowrey had seen Davidson with old notes that a student should not have, which he considered cheating.

== Aftermath ==
Three months later, a copycat threat flier was sent, with threats against professors and racial insults.

On July 19, 1997, Davidson was convicted under a plea bargain which spared him from the death penalty. He was sentenced to three consecutive life sentences without the possibility of parole.

L3 Memorial Park, dedicated on August 25, 2003, is located on the San Diego State University campus, near the engineering building, as a memorial to the slain professors. Also, the Preston Lowrey III Memorial Scholarship Fund was established at the university shortly after the shooting.

== See also ==
- List of school shootings in the United States by death toll
- List of school shootings in the United States (before 2000)
- List of homicides in California
