= James Mulvaney =

American investment banker, attorney, and businessman (1922–2010)

Personal details
- Born: James Francis Mulvaney; November 2, 1922 Chicago, Illinois, U.S.
- Died: October 10, 2010 (aged 87) San Diego, California, U.S.
- Resting place: El Camino Memorial Park
- Spouse: Mary Ruth Rinderer (m. 1946)
- Children: 7
- Relatives: Dylan Mulvaney (granddaughter)
- Education: Loyola University Chicago (BS, JD)
- Occupation: Lawyer, businessman, investment banker, military officer

Military service
- Allegiance: United States
- Branch/service: United States Navy; Judge Advocate General's Corps
- Rank: Lieutenant commander
- Battles/wars: World War II • Pacific War; Korean War

James Francis Mulvaney, Sr. (November 2, 1922 – October 10, 2010) was an American investment banker, businessman, attorney, and military officer. He was the treasurer of National Steel and Shipbuilding Company and, later, the president of the United States National Bank of San Diego. Mulvaney also served as the president of the San Diego Padres when they were in the Pacific Coast League. When the Padres joined Major League Baseball, Mulvaney served as vice president and general counsel.

== Early life and education ==
Mulvaney was born in 1922 in Chicago to Charles Stewart Mulvaney and Christine Marie Bohan. He graduated from Loyola University Chicago in 1942 with a bachelor of science degree in finance.

He earned a Juris Doctor degree from Loyola University Chicago School of Law and became a member of the Illinois State Bar Association.

== Career ==
=== Military ===
During World War II, he served as a lieutenant commander in the United States Navy, commanding the destroyer escort USS Kyne. During the Korean War, Mulvaney served as a commander in the Judge Advocate General's Corps.

=== Business, law, and finance ===
Mulvaney worked as an investment banker and lawyer. He began his career working as the treasurer at National Steel and Shipbuilding. He worked for C. Arnholt Smith at Westgate-California Corporation and later served as the president of the United States National Bank of San Diego. After the bank was purchased by Crocker National Bank, Mulvaney stayed on as an executive.

He was president of the San Diego Padres when they were in the minor league. After the team became joined the major league, Mulvaney served as vice president and general counsel for the Padres.

He was an attorney and senior partner at the law firm Mulvaney, Kahan, & Barry from 1973 to 2010. Mulvaney served as board chairman and chief executive officer of Chela Financial Group from 1983 to 2003.

== Personal life ==
Mulvaney married his wife, Mary Ruth Rinderer, in December 1945. The couple met as teenagers while vacationing at their families' summer cottages at Paw Paw Lake in Michigan. They had seven children. Mulvaney's granddaughter is social media personality Dylan Mulvaney.

He died on October 10, 2010. His funeral was held on October 23, 2010 at All Hallows Catholic Church in La Jolla. Mulvaney was buried at El Camino Memorial Park.
