= 1937 San Diego Padres season =

1937 San Diego Padres (PCL)
- League: Pacific Coast League
- Ballpark: Lane Field
- City: San Diego
- Record: 97–81
- League place: 3rd
- Owners: Bill "Hardrock" Lane
- Managers: Frank Shellenback

The 1937 San Diego Padres season, was the second season for the original San Diego Padres baseball team of the Pacific Coast League (PCL). The team began in 1903 as the Sacramento Solons, a charter member of the PCL. The team moved several times and were the Hollywood Stars from 1926 to 1935. Team owner Bill "Hardrock" Lane moved the team from Hollywood to San Diego in 1936. The 1937 Padres won the PCL pennant after defeating Sacramento Solons and the Portland Beavers in post-season series.

== Season overview ==
The 1937 PCL season ran from April 2 to September 19, 1937. The Padres, led by manager Frank Shellenback, finished third in the PCL with a 97–81 record. The Padres qualified for the PCL's four-team playoffs. They defeated the first-place Sacramento Solons, four games to none, in the opening round, and then defeated the second-place Portland Beavers in the championship series, again by four games to zero.

Ted Williams, age 18 when the season began, played in left field for the 1937 Padres, compiling a .291 batting average with 23 home runs in 138 games. On December 7, 1937, the Padres dealt Williams, described in the next day's The Boston Globe as "a string-bean 19-year-old outfielder from San Diego", to the Boston Red Sox in exchange for cash plus outfielder Dom D'Allessandro and infielder Al Niemiec. In 1999, Williams was ranked as number eight on The Sporting News' list of the 100 Greatest Baseball Players, where he was the highest-ranking left fielder.

Catcher George Detore won the 1937 PCL batting crown with a .334 batting average. Five other Padres also finished the 1937 season with batting averages higher than Williams: right fielder Rupe Thompson (.326), second baseman Jimmie Reese (.314), first baseman George McDonald (.312), center fielder Hal Patchett (.306), and outfielder Cedric Durst (.293).

San Diego's outfielders also ranked as the league's best defensively. Center fielder Hal Patchett led the PCL (all positions) with a .993 fielding percentage, committing only three errors with 442 putouts and five assists. Right fielder Rupe Thompson led the league's outfielders with 27 assists.

The Padres' pitching staff was led by Tiny Chaplin who appeared in 43 games and compiled a 23–15 win–loss record with a 2.72 earned run average (ERA). Manny Salvo compiled a 19–13 record and led the PCL with 196 strikeouts.

== 1937 PCL standings ==
Team	W	L	Pct.	GB
Sacramento Solons	102	76	.573	--
San Francisco Seals	98	80	.551	4.0
San Diego Padres	97	81	.545	5.0
Portland Beavers	90	86	.511	11.0
Los Angeles Angels	90	88	.506	12.0
Seattle Indians	81	96	.458	20.5
Oakland Oaks	79	98	.446	22.5
Mission Reds	73	105	.410	29.0

== Statistics ==
=== Batting ===
Note: Pos = Position; G = Games played; AB = At bats; H = Hits; Avg. = Batting average; HR = Home runs; SLG = Slugging percentage; RBI = Runs batted in; SB = Stolen bases

Pos	Player	G	AB	H	Avg.	HR	SLG	RBI	SB
C	George Detore	133	434	145	.334	3	.442	72	16
RF, 3B	Rupe Thompson	169	647	211	.326	16	.464	92	13
2B	Jimmie Reese	138	506	159	.314	2	.399	78	4
1B	George McDonald	163	632	197	.312	4	.388	102	5
CF	Hal Patchett	169	689	211	.306	8	.419	66	21
RF, LF	Cedric Durst	137	458	134	.293	2	.369	57	4
LF	Ted Williams	138	454	132	.291	23	.504	98	1
SS	George Myatt	155	565	159	.281	6	.365	51	33
SS, 3B, 2B	Joe Berkowitz	126	422	107	.254	0	.318	35	3
3B	Ernie Holman	94	305	68	.223	1	.272	28	2
C	Chick Starr	92	278	61	.219	0	.273	34	0

=== Pitching ===
Note: G = Games pitched; IP = Innings pitched; W = Wins; L = Losses; PCT = Win percentage; ERA = Earned run average; SO = Strikeouts

Player	G	IP	W	L	PCT	ERA	SO
Tiny Chaplin	43	318.0	23	15	.605	2.72	151
Manny Salvo	46	278.0	19	13	.594	3.08	196
Dick Ward	42	284.0	18	18	.500	4.44	92
Wally Herbert	39	244.0	17	14	.548	3.02	90
Howard Craghead	42	245.0	16	13	.552	3.27	119
Herman Pillette	36	126.0	4	5	.444	3.79	38
