= The 2026 Queerties Awards =

Awards for contributions by LGBTQ+ community

- Awarded for: contributions and achievements by members of the LGBTQ+ community.
- Sponsored by: Lexus
- Date: March 10, 2026
- Venue: The Avalon Hollywood, LA
- Country: United States
- Presented by: Queerty
- Hosted by: Trixie Mattel

Highlights
- Most wins: Cynthia Erivo; Heated Rivalry; Wicked: For Good; (2)
- Website: queerty.com/queerties/

Television/radio coverage
- Produced by: Q.Digital

The 2026 Queerties Awards took place on March 10, 2026 at The Avalon Hollywood in Los Angeles, hosted by Trixie Mattel. The 14th annual edition honored the LGBTQ+ community's brightest stars and innovators in music, film, television, sports, fashion, comedy, and the internet, and are voted by the public throughout Queerty's website.

Honorees included Margaret Cho with the Icon Award, Megan Stalter with the Vanguard Award, and Mae Martin with the Groundbreaker Award. The biggest winners of the night were British actress Cynthia Erivo, the film Wicked: For Good, and the TV series Heated Rivalry, each one winning two awards.

== Winners and nominees ==
The full nominations were announced on January 20, 2026:

Music

Breakout Musical Artist
Katseye; Lola Young (Runner-Up); Adam Mac; Amaarae; Bentley Robles; Cain Culto; CMAT; Eli; Gigi Perez; RaiNao
Anthem	Music Video
Lady Gaga — "Abracadabra"; Chappell Roan — "The Subway" (Runner-Up); Durand Bernarr — "Overqualified"; Slayyyter — "Beat Up Chanel$"; Demi Lovato — "Fast"; Ashnikko — "Sticky Fingers"; Disco Lines & Tinashe — "No Broke Boys"; Omar Rudberg — "I'm Not a Boy"; Huntrix — "Golden"; Ben Platt — "Diet Pepsi"	Conan Gray — "Vodka Cranberry"; Kesha — "Boy Crazy" (Runner-Up); Lucy Dacus — "Best Guess"; G Flip — "Big Ol' Hammer"; Frankie Grande — "Boys"; David Archuleta — "Crème Brulée"; Guitarricadelafuente — "Full Time Papi"; Nemo — "God's A Raver"; Jim Verraros — "Good Boy"; Khalid — "Out of Body"

Television/Streaming

Digital Series	TV Performance
Dragvestigations; King of Drag (Runner-Up); House Guest With Scott Evans; Happy Endings with Bruno; La Más Draga; Slayers: Wheel of Fate; Hopeless Romantic Society; Unconventional; Very Important People; Wish You Were Queer	François Arnaud — Heated Rivalry; Bella Ramsey — The Last of Us (Runner-Up); Benito Skinner — Overcompensating; Colman Domingo — The Four Seasons; Erin Doherty — Adolescence; Michaela Jaé Rodriguez — Loot; Miles Heizer — Boots; Owen Thiele — Adults; Pablo Alborán — Breathless; Supriya Ganesh — The Pitt
TV Drama	TV Comedy
Heated Rivalry (Crave/HBO Max); The Pitt (HBO) (Runner- Up); Olympo (Netflix); Pluribus (Apple TV); Severance (Apple TV); The Gilded Age (HBO); The Hunting Wives (Netflix); The Last of Us (HBO); The White Lotus (HBO); Wayward (Netflix)	Boots (Netflix); Hacks (HBO Max) (Runner-Up); Adults (FX/Hulu); Loot (Apple TV); I Love LA (HBO); Mid-Century Modern (Hulu); Overcompensating (Prime Video); Palm Royale (Apple TV); Survival of the Thickest (Netflix); The Four Seasons (Netflix)
Reality TV	Reality TV Star
The Traitors (Peacock); The Great British Bake Off (Netflix) (Runner-Up); Back to the Frontier (HBO Max); Below Deck (Bravo); The Boulet Brothers Dragula: Titans (Shudder/AMC+); House of Villains (E!); Project Runway (Freeform); Survivor (CBS); The Boyfriend (Netflix); The Ultimatum: Queer Love (Netflix)	Ezra Sosa — Dancing With the Stars; Tiffany "New York" Pollard — I Love New York (Runner-Up); Chrishell Stause — Selling Sunset; Emira D'Spain — Next Gen NYC; Fraser Olender — Below Deck; Gabby Windey — The Bachelorette, The Traitors; Michols Peña — Southern Hospitality; Nany González — The Challenge; Pari Kim — Love on the Spectrum; Zelah Glasson — Big Brother

Films

Comedy Movie	Drama Movie
Twinless (Lionsgate); Pillion (A24) (Runner-Up); A Nice Indian Boy (Blue Harbor Entertainment); Griffin in Summer (Vertical Entertainment); Queens of the Dead (Independent Film Company); Sorry, Baby (A24); The Parenting (HBO); The Queen of My Dreams (Willa and Product of Culture); The Wedding Banquet (Bleecker Street); Noah's Arc: The Movie (Paramount+)	Wicked: For Good (Universal Pictures); Plainclothes (Magnolia Pictures/Curzon Film) (Runner-Up); 100 Nights of Hero (Independent Film Company); Before We Forget (The Film Collaborative); Hedda (Amazon MGM Studios/Prime Video); I Wish You All the Best (Lionsgate); Kiss of the Spider Woman (Roadside Attractions/Lionsgate/LD Entertainment); On Swift Horses (Sony Pictures Classics); Peter Hujar's Day (Janus Films); The History of Sound (Mubi)
Film Performance
Cynthia Erivo — Wicked: For Good; Russell Tovey — Plainclothes (Runner-Up); Andrew Scott — Blue Moon; Corey Fogelmanis — I Wish You All the Best; Eva Victor — Sorry, Baby; Karan Soni — A Nice Indian Boy; Kelly Marie Tran — The Wedding Banquet; River Gallo — Ponyboi; Tessa Thompson — Hedda; Tonatiuh — Kiss of the Spider Woman

Drag

Drag Royalty	Future All-Star
Bosco; Anania (Runner-Up); Utica Queen; Hedda Lettuce; King Molasses; Evah Destruction; Ginger Minj; Gloria Groove; Aja; Brigitte Bandit	Suzie Toot; Kori King (Runner-Up); Lexi; Lady Camden; Jewels Sparkles; Plasma; The Widow Von'Du; Lana Ja'rae; Joella; Sam Star

Others

Style Icon	Theater
Sarah Paulson; Lux Pascal (Runner-Up); Brad Goreski; Andrew Christian; Nicky Campbell; Antoni Porowski; Conner Ives; Jeremy Pope; Willy Chavarria; Veejay Floresca	Oh Mary! by Cole Escola; Clarkston by Samuel D. Hunter (Runner-Up); Bat Boy: The Musical by Laurence O'Keefe and Nell Benjamin; Color Theories by Julio Torres; Ginger Twinsies by Kevin Zak; Heaux Church by Brandon Kyle Goodman; Messy White Gays by Drew Droege; Practice by Nazareth Hassan; Prince F**** by Jordan Tannahill; Saturday Church by Damon Cardasis and James Ijames
Podcast	Read
Kelly Mantle — The Kelly Mantle Show; Bowen Yang and Matt Rogers — Las Culturistas (Runner-Up); Shana Sumers and Kris Chesson — Bad Queers; Ts Madison — Outlaws; Tyler Oakley and Korey Kuhl — Psychobabble; Caleb Hearon — So True; Raven-Symoné and Miranda Maday — Tea Time; Eric Williams — That's a Gay Ass Podcast; Justin Sylvester and Blakely Thornton — The Yestergays; Jake Shane — Therapuss	Cynthia Erivo — Simply More; Lukas Gage — I Wrote This for Attention (Runner-Up); Kristen Kish — Accidentally on Purpose; Tourmaline — Marsha; Jorge Xolalpa — Ni De Aqui, Ni De Alla; Parvati Shallow — Nice Girls Don't Win; Dylan Mulvaney — Paper Doll; Alyson Stoner — Semi-Well-Adjusted Despite Literally Everything; Katherine Moennig and Leisha Hailey — So Gay for You; Prabal Gurung — Walk Like a Girl
TikToker	Insta-Follow
Niecy Nash; The Goddess Boys (Runner-Up); Dylan Kevitch; Grant & Ash; Jake Schroeder; Johnny Sibilly; Kendahl Landreth; Nathan Jun; Nirupam; Tell The Bees	Cheyenne Jackson; Uly Morazan (Runner-Up); Hailee and Kendra; Hunter Gallagher; Kevin Ortega-Rojas; Laron Best; Melissa King; Stacey Cay; Star Amerasu; Studbudz
Badass	Sports Hero
Jonathan Bailey; Doechii (Runner-Up); Onya Nurve; Vivian Jenna Wilson; Paige Bueckers; Reneé Rapp; Tramell Tillman; Ricky Martin; Jeff Hiller; Ts Madison	Gus Kenworthy (Olympic Skier); Amber Glenn (Olympic Figure Skater) (Runner-Up); Becky Hammon (WNBA Champion Coach); Yared Nuguse (Olympic Runner); Cal Calamia (Marathoner); Blaize Shiek & Louie Conn (NFL Cheerleaders); Jason Collins (First Publicly Out NBA Player); Alyssa Thomas (WNBA All-Star); Erik Shoji (Olympic Volleyball Player); Sue Bird (Basketball Hall of Famer)
Comic	Next Big Thing
Caleb Hearon; Ren Q. Dawe (Runner-Up); Fortune Feimster; Hannah Einbinder; James Tom; Jay Jurden; Robby Hoffman; Paris Sashay; Tig Notaro; Wally Baram	Red, White & Royal Wedding (Amazon MGM Studios/Prime Video); The Devil Wears Prada 2 (20th Century Studios) (Runner-Up); American Horror Story 13 (FX/Hulu); Cats: The Jellicle Ball based on Cats by Andrew Lloyd Webber; Confessions II by Madonna; Heartstopper Forever (Netflix); Practical Magic 2 (Warner Brothers); Scary Movie 6 (Paramount Pictures); Stop! That! Train! (World of Wonder/Bleecker Street); The Comeback (Season 3) (HBO)

Honors

Icon Award	Vanguard Award	Groundbreaker Award
Maragaret Cho	Megan Stalter	Mae Martin

== Most wins ==
List of two or more winners:

Most wins
Field	Nominees	Wins	Awards
Artists	Cynthia Erivo	2	Film Performance (Wicked: For Good); Read (Simply More)
Film	Wicked: For Good	2	Drama Movie; Film Performance (Cynthia Erivo)
TV	Heated Rivalry	2	TV Drama; TV Performance (François Arnaud)

== Most nominations ==
List of most nominated individuals, and projects:

Most nominations
Field	Nominees	Total
Artists	Cynthia Erivo, Caleb Hearon, Ts Madison	2
TV	Adults, Below Deck, Boots, Heated Rivarly, Loot, Overcompensating, The Four Seasons, The Last of Us, The Pitt	2
Film	A Nice Indian Boy, Hedda, I Wish You All the Best, Kiss of the Spider Woman, Plainclothes, Sorry, Baby, The Wedding Banquet, Wicked: For Good	2
