= Air California =

Airline of the United States (1966–1987)

Air California AirCal

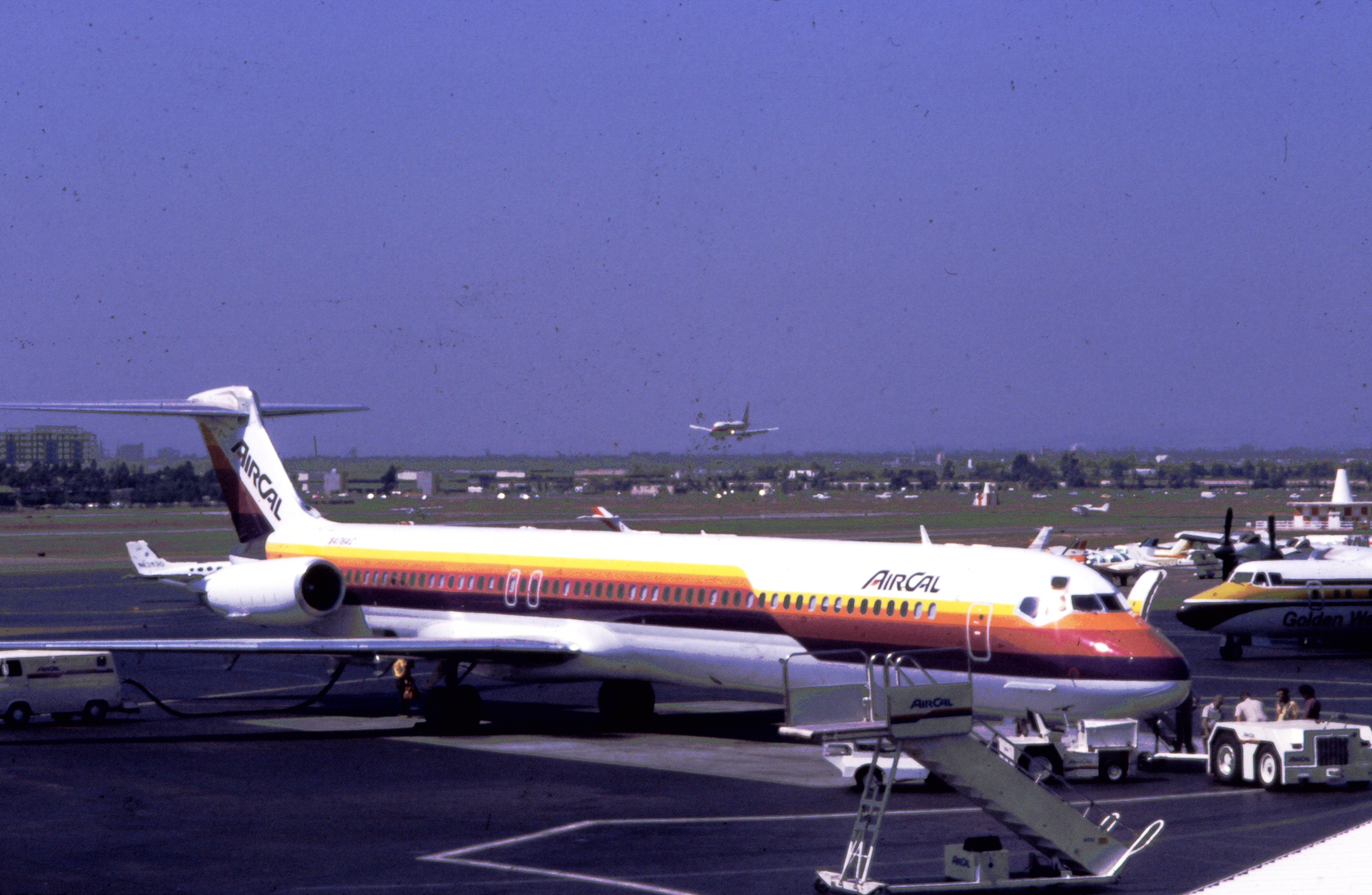
- an AirCal McDonnell-Douglas MD-80 at John Wayne Airport
IATA	ICAO	Call sign
OC	ACL	AIRCAL
- Founded: April 12, 1966; 60 years ago (as Air California)
- Commenced operations: January 16, 1967; 59 years ago (as Air California); April 6, 1981; 45 years ago (as AirCal)
- Ceased operations: April 6, 1981; 45 years ago (as Air California); July 1, 1987; 39 years ago (merged into American Airlines)
- Hubs: John Wayne Airport
- Frequent-flyer program: AAdvantage
- Fleet size: 37 at time of merger
- Destinations: 17 at time of merger
- Parent company: Westgate-California (1970–1981); ACI Holdings (1986–1987); AMR Corporation (1987)
- Headquarters: Newport Beach, California
- Key people: C. Arnholt Smith; William Lyon; George Argyros

Original Air California logo, used from 1967 to 1977

Air California, later renamed AirCal, was a U.S. airline company headquartered in Newport Beach, California that started in the 1960s as a California intrastate airline. The airline's home airport was Orange County Airport, now known as John Wayne Airport.

Air California was the "other" California intrastate carrier, counterpart to better known Pacific Southwest Airlines (PSA). The two airlines had very different origins. PSA was the product of a highly competitive, lightly regulated earlier period in California intrastate airline history, while Air California was born into a later, far more regulated California environment. The California regulator explicitly aimed to ensure Air California's success by shielding it from PSA competition, in particular at Orange County Airport, from which PSA was excluded. Air California was further protected by Orange County itself. From 1967 through 1980, Orange County ensured Air California was one of only two mainline airlines to have access to (and the dominant carrier at) Orange County Airport, a lucrative duopoly that allowed Air California to prosper.

Air California/AirCal had a series of unusual owners. From 1970 to 1974, it was under the control of C. Arnholt Smith, a San Diego powerbroker, later convicted of fraud. From 1974 to 1981, it was controlled by Smith's former holding company Westgate-California Corporation (WCC), while WCC was in an extended period of bankruptcy run by a court-appointed trustee. From 1981 to 1987, AirCal was controlled by two California real estate developers, who, despite the turbulent nature of the industry at the time, made a success of the airline, before selling it to American Airlines.

Following the federal Airline Deregulation Act in 1978, Air California expanded beyond its namesake state. The airline was renamed AirCal in 1981 and merged into American Airlines in 1987. By that time, AirCal flew as far east as Chicago and as far north as Seattle, Anchorage, and Vancouver, BC. But less than four years later, American gutted the former AirCal network, leaving little to show for its purchase.

== History ==
=== Startup ===
Air California originated in a December 1965 meeting in Corona del Mar by William Myers, Alan H. Kenison (later a founder of Jet America Airlines), Mark T. Gates Jr., William L. Pereira Jr. (son of noted architect William Pereira who designed the Theme Building at Los Angeles International Airport (LAX)) and Lud Renick to discuss air service from Orange County to San Francisco, with the idea of Air California as the result. At the time, air service from Orange County Airport was minimal despite the county having a population of about 1.2 million and being the fastest growing in the country. Air travel in California was then dominated by Pacific Southwest Airlines (PSA) yet it declined to serve Orange County. Airport officials had approached all West Coast carriers in an effort to attract service to Orange County Airport, but none expressed interest. As a result, Air California was designed to do what PSA would not: serve Orange County.

At the time, most major US airlines were tightly regulated by the Civil Aeronautics Board (CAB). PSA was the exception: its intrastate status exempted it from CAB oversight, which only applied to interstate flights. It had used that freedom to grow from nothing in 1949 to a jet carrier in 1965, taking market share away on its California routes from much larger but less efficient carriers regulated by the CAB. Air California was incorporated on April 12, 1966 and the same month, applied to the California Public Utilities Commission (CPUC) to be a California intrastate airline for its first route, from Orange County Airport to San Francisco Airport at a fare of $14.85. The CPUC approved the application in September, requiring a minimum of five frequencies per day. In December, Air California had an initial public offering and the airline launched its first services January 16, 1967, using two Lockheed Electra aircraft. Total capital raised prior to the first flight was $5.3mm, including $2.5mm from the stock offering.

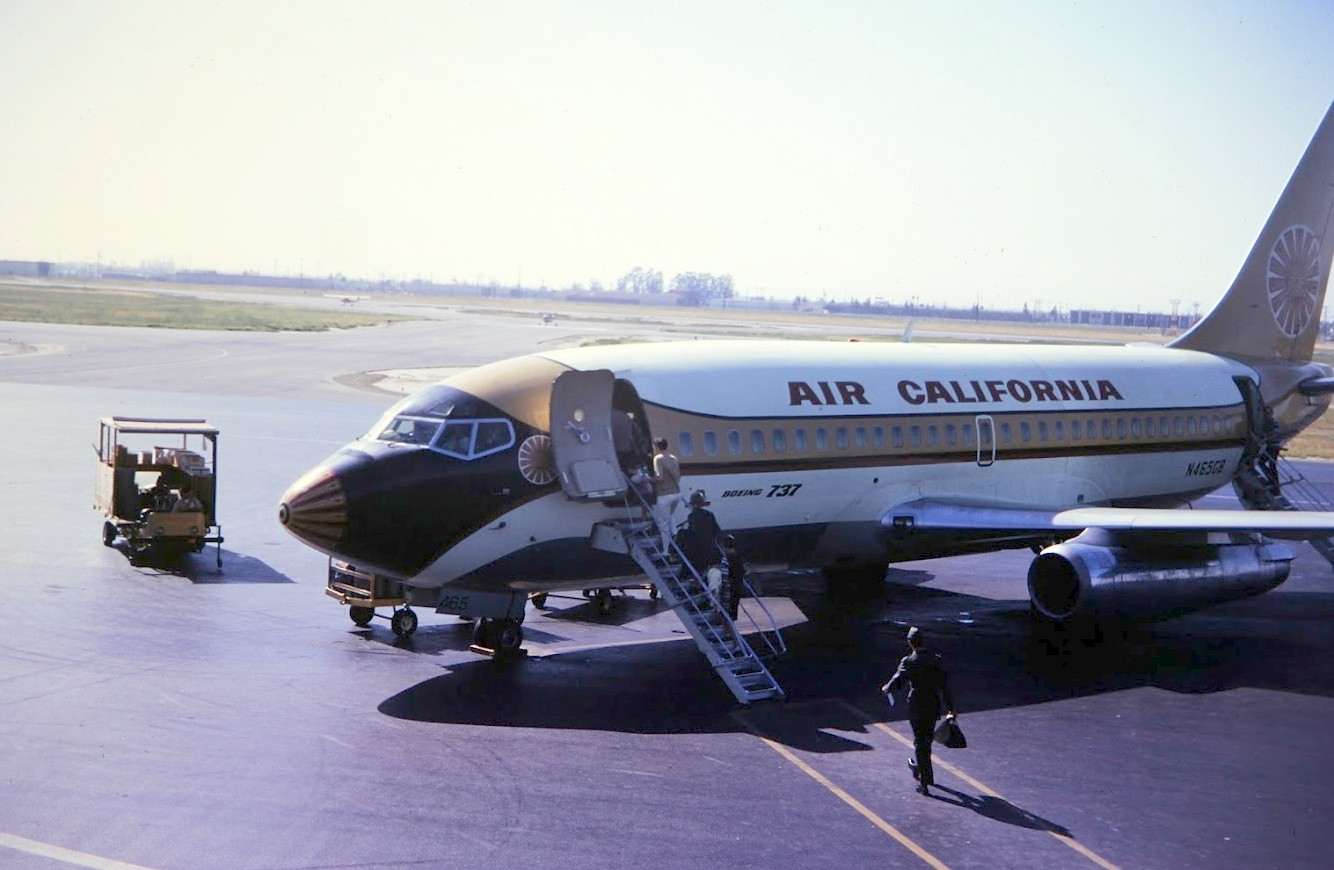
Air California 737-100 in 1969 at Orange County airport

By April 1967, Air California was operating 48 nonstop Lockheed L-188 Electra flights a week from Orange County (SNA) to San Francisco (SFO). Later that year, in October 1967, Air California had taken delivery of two more Electras, bringing its total to four. Service was subsequently expanded to include San Jose and Oakland. In 1968, the airline added two DC-9s to the fleet expanded service to Ontario and Burbank; however, by the end of the year both the DC-9s and all Electras had been phased out in favor of six 737-200s.

By May 1968, the airline was operating 92 flights per week from SNA to SFO, primarily using Douglas DC-9-10 twin jets, as well as 50 flights a week from SNA to SJC, with most continuing on to OAK.

By 1976, Air California was operating nonstop intrastate jet service between Orange County and San Francisco, San Jose, Oakland, Sacramento, San Diego and Palm Springs; between San Diego and Oakland and San Jose; between Ontario and Oakland and San Jose; and between Palm Springs and San Francisco, San Jose and Oakland.

=== First failed PSA merger and sale ===
Air California's initial financial performance was weak. In December 1969 it agreed to a merger with PSA, citing these results. Air California shareholders approved the deal, but shortly thereafter, in May 1970, PSA withdrew from the deal, citing a "negative view" by the CPUC. Within a week, Air California's CEO had resigned, and a new buyer surfaced, Westgate-California Corporation (WCC). In June 1970, WCC acquired 60% of the carrier, which was approved by the CPUC on the grounds that Air California's future was in doubt. In July 1971, WCC pumped $2.5mm into Air California, buying shares that increased its stake to 81%. Notably during this period Air California provided flight attendant training to Southwest Airlines during its startup phase.

Air California Financial Results, 1967 thru 1973
(US$000)	1967	1968	1969	1970	1971	1972	1973
Operating revenue	4,354	8,849	13,686	16,144	19,729	22,905	27,023
Operating expense	5,295	9,992	15,540	15,950	20,304	21,905	23,956
Operating result	(941)	(1,143)	(1,854)	194	(575)	1,000	3,067
Interest	(258)	(616)	(564)	(596)	(460)	(376)	(343)
Pre-tax net	(1,199)	(1,759)	(2,418)	(402)	(1,035)	624	2,724
Operating margin	-21.6%	-12.9%	-13.5%	1.2%	-2.9%	4.4%	11.3%
Pre-tax margin	-27.5%	-19.9%	-17.7%	-2.5%	-5.2%	2.7%	10.1%

WCC ownership was a mixed blessing. Its owner C. Arnholt Smith, was a powerful San Diego businessman and banker, as well as the owner of the San Diego Padres baseball team and United States National Bank of San Diego (USNB), largest bank in that city and the 10th largest in California. He was also a close associate and donor of President Richard Nixon. Smith was highly controversial and was accused of self dealing, including enriching family members and associates through transactions involving WCC, USNB, and related entities, as well as making illegal campaign contributions. WCC made its first loss in 11 years, in 1971.

There was one immediate benefit from WCC ownership: Air California was able to take its seventh 737, which was delivered to WCC and transferred to the airline in September 1970. An eighth aircraft was delivered in May 1971. During this period, the airline also expanded its service offerings, including introducing first-class ("Fiesta") service and adding flights to Palm Springs in 1969, followed by San Diego in 1970, though service to Burbank was suspended. In 1971, Sacramento was added to the network.

=== Second failed PSA merger, parent company bankruptcy and scandal ===
In mid 1972, WCC agreed to sell Air California to PSA. WCC told the CPUC that Air California showed no signs of making money and WCC would not further support it. In February 1973 the CPUC approved the merger despite heavy opposition including from its own legal staff. However the merger faced opposition from the US Department of Justice on anti-trust grounds. The combined airline would have had an 81% market share on the Los Angeles Basin to San Francisco Bay market, with an even higher market shares on individual submarkets. These figures illustrate the extent to which California's intrastate carriers had displaced the far larger CAB-regulated carriers prior to deregulation.

However, in May 1973, the U.S. Securities and Exchange Commission sued to place WCC in receivership, citing serious malfeasance by Smith. At the same time outside auditors withdrew their certification of Air California's accounts for 1971 and 1972, as well as WCC1971 account. Trading in both Air California and WCC stocks was subsequently halted. Almost exactly a year after it had been announced, the PSA offer for Air California lapsed. In October, USNB was seized by the FDIC, effectively undermining the foundation of Smith's empire and in February 1974, WCC filed for Chapter X bankruptcy. Under chapter X bankruptcy WCC operated under the control of trustees, who managed it in the interests of shareholders. The bankruptcy dragged on for eight years, with WCC selling pieces of itself along the way, until it was finally liquidated in 1982.

=== Survival: the role of the California regulator ===
Prior to 1979 US airline deregulation, as a California intrastate carrier, Air California was economically regulated by the CPUC, in contrast to most US airlines of the era, which were economically regulated by CAB. Prior to 1965, the CPUC only had the right to regulate intrastate ticket prices. So long as they followed CPUC tariffs, anyone was free to start an intrastate California airline, to enter and leave specific markets and to choose their own frequencies. But in 1965, the CPUC gained the right to regulate airline certification, market entry/exit and service quality for California intrastate airlines, effectively, becoming a mini-CAB for California intrastate airlines.

Air California was unprofitable for the first five years (though it broke even on an operating basis in 1970; see table) and CPUC regulation was critical to its survival. In 1969 the CPUC said "From the beginning we have recognized the need to protect Air California from destructive competition, at least until it becomes a viable operator." This took four forms: (i) CPUC ensured that other than some minor routes, Air California did not compete with PSA, leaving the carriers with largely non-overlapping route networks. This left Air California free to concentrate its energies on competing with CAB carriers on its routes, which had higher costs. (ii) The CPUC approved higher airfares for Air California than for PSA was authorized on similar routes. (iii) The CPUC stopped the further new entry of intrastate airlines. (iv) in at least one case, the CPUC restrained PSA growth with the explicit goal of helping Air California. In fact, from 1965 onward, the CPUC certified only one other carrier, Holiday Airlines, which for some reason chose to fly only to Lake Tahoe.

=== Orange County Airport duopoly and financial stability ===
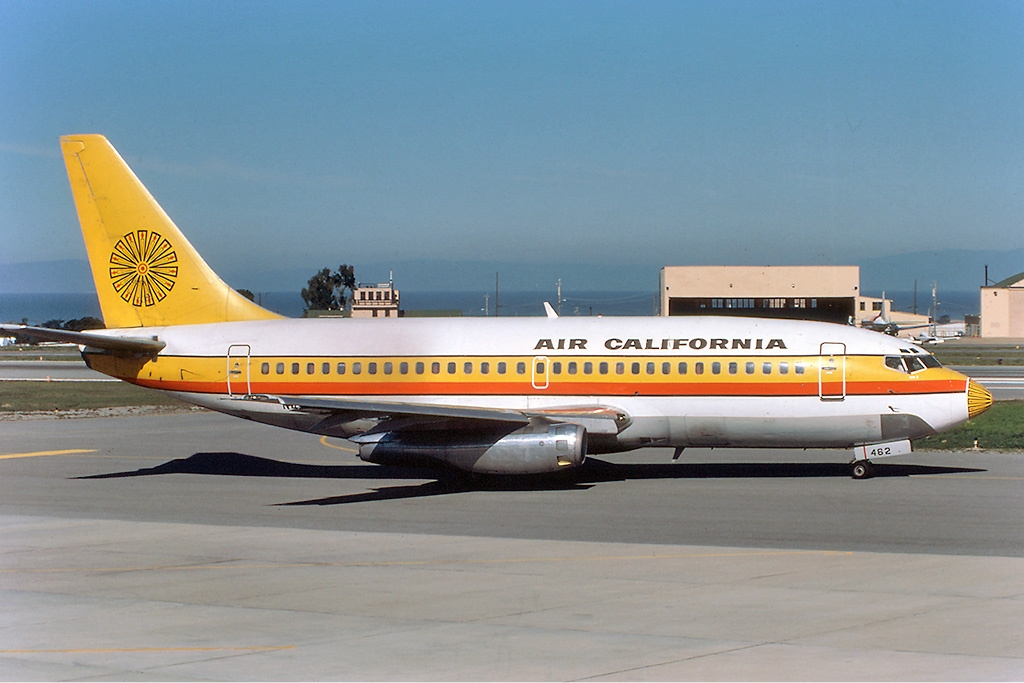
Revised Air California livery shown on a Boeing 737-200 in 1980

As its parent company was mired in bankruptcy, Air California's fortunes improved, and the airline became solidly profitable from 1973 onwards. Air California benefited not only from CPUC support, but also from its effective duopoly at Orange County Airport. From 1967 until late 1980, only Air California and Bonanza Air Lines - and its successors, Air West (1968) and Hughes Airwest (1970) flew to Orange County Airport. This exclusivity was highly significant: by the mid-1970s, up to 75% of Air California's passengers traveled to or from Orange County. In 1979, the FAA determined that this was, discriminatory, leading to the airport opening to other airlines.

In February 1975, Holiday Airlines collapsed, and both Air California and PSA received emergency CPUC authorization to backfill service at Lake Tahoe Airport, which the commission required be operated using Electras. Air California subsequently acquired three.

=== Intrastate no more, sale to new owners and AirCal ===
In 1977, still in Chapter X bankruptcy, WCC bought out Air California's minority shareholders and made it a wholly owned subsidiary, in furtherance of its intent to reorganize with Air California as its main business. In 1977-78 Air California added two 737-100 aircraft from Aloha. By 1978, Air California begun service to Reno, Nevada and was no longer a strictly intrastate airline. With out-of-state expansion spurring it on, Air California ended 1979 with 11 737s and had 16 at the end of 1980, while at the same time retiring all Electras.

In October 1980, Air Florida announced it had purchased interests in the to-be-reorganized WCC from two WCC creditors. This kicked off a bidding war for post-reorganization WCC, which Air Florida ultimately won in November for $47mm. WCC at the time only owned Air California and a Puerto Rican tuna cannery. Air Florida would have to wait until WCC completed its reorganization to take control of Air California. In the meantime, the trustees remained in charge with a mandate to get the best deal for WCC investors. As a result, competing bidders adjusted their offers to improve the expected return for WCC investors. When the auction concluded in May 1981, a new investor group prevailed with a bid of $61.5mm, $57.5mm of which was financed by Wells Fargo. The winning bidders came from AirCal Investments, a vehicle formed by two Orange County real estate developers, William Lyon and George Argyros. The WCC's trustees openly expressed their satisfaction with the results preferring local ownership. They had opposed Air Florida's surprise bid to buy WCC and had, in fact put Argyros and Lyon together after they had separately expressed interest.

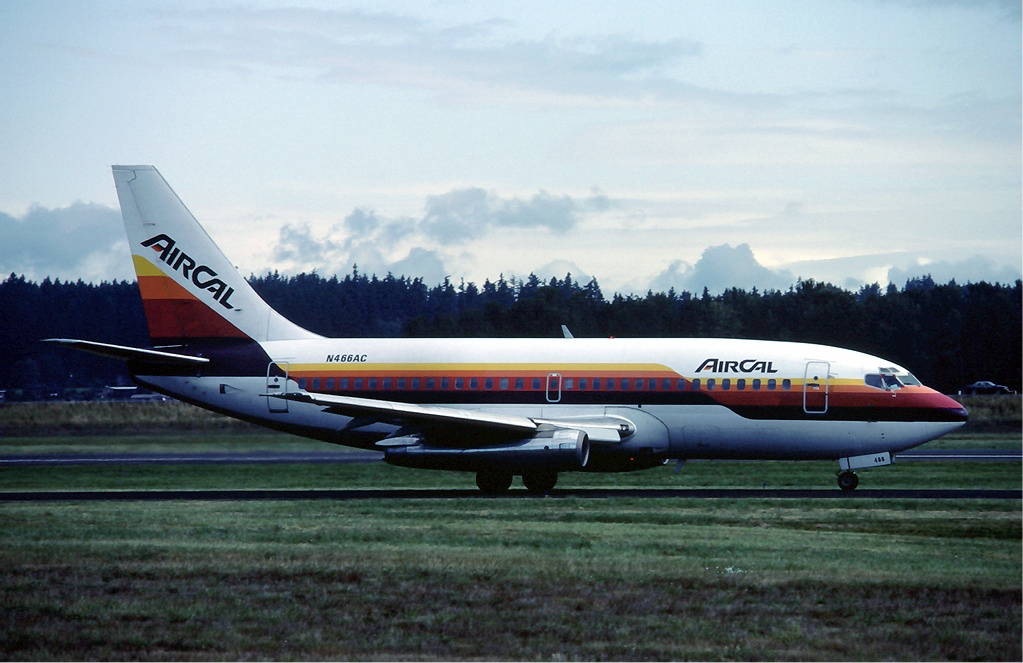
AirCal Boeing 737-200 in 1983

The airline that Lyon and Argyros bought came, as of April 6, 1981, with a new name (AirCal) and a new image. Landor Associates did the new livery, Mary McFadden did the new uniforms.

Air California/AirCal Financial Results, 1979 thru 1986
(USD mm)	1979	1980	1981	1982	1983	1984	1985	1986
Op revenue	98.1	158.8	211.6	214.7	239.0	303.9	344.5	375.4
Op profit (loss)	1.3	12.2	0.3	(20.7)	17.3	24.5	12.8	(3.7)
Net profit (loss)	1.3	9.9	4.4	(24.0)	3.7	11.2	9.3	(1.6)
Op margin	1.3%	7.7%	0.2%	-9.6%	7.2%	8.1%	3.7%	-1.0%
Net margin	1.4%	6.2%	2.1%	-11.2%	1.6%	3.7%	2.7%	-0.4%

=== Stripped of John Wayne Airport advantage; financial distress ===
AirCal/Air California Revenue Passenger-Miles/Kilometers, in millions
Year	Traffic
1968	218 RPMs
1970	291 RPMs
1972	387 RPMs
1973	747 RPKs
1975	898 RPKs
1979	1624 RPKs
1985	2961 RPKs

After unbroken profitability while WCC was in Chapter X, AirCal under Lyon & Argyros was immediately unprofitable. Headwinds included the debt the two had taken on to buy AirCal, the early 1980s recession, the extended impact of the August air traffic controller's strike, which limited airline aircraft utilization and growth and the expanding impact of 1979 airline deregulation, which spread competitors into AirCal markets, and vice versa. For instance, PSA finally broke into John Wayne Airport (SNA), after 15 years of trying. AirCal had entered Los Angeles International Airport (LAX) in 1980, initially aided by a late 1980 strike at PSA. By this point AirCal was no longer protected by the CPUC or the SNA duopoly. At the same time, rising fuel costs added further pressure, with jet fuel prices increasing from 40 cents/gal at the beginning of 1979 to over a dollar in 1981, as a result of the 1979 oil crisis.

AirCal was squeezed at its SNA base, its historic source of profits. From 1970 to 1985, SNA capped daily average jet departures to 41/day, with AirCal having 27 during the duopoly period that ended 1980. But the FAA demanded other airlines be accommodated. As other airlines entered, incumbent frequencies were cut to accommodate them. AirCal was the biggest incumbent, so was the biggest victim; AirCal's average daily SNA frequencies dropped over the course of several years from 27 to 12.5. Many airlines wanted a piece of SNA and were even willing to buy MD-80s (then the quietest narrowbody available) to do so. For instance, Frontier's decision to get MD-80s was SNA-driven.

AirCal came close to failure, but was saved by a combination of cost savings, with substantial layoffs, a 10% wage reduction for those who remained, a realignment of its route network, concentrating on increasing frequency on important routes like LAX to San Francisco. Lyon took over the CEO position himself. During this period, the historic Hughes Airwest network was being eliminated, as Hughes successor Republic withdrew from the west coast. Western Airlines intrastate service was also shrinking. AirCal was also substantially recapitalized, with the combination of an initial public offering with Lyon and Argyros converting their from the airline into equity. This relieved the airline of a substantial debt load.

=== Final years ===
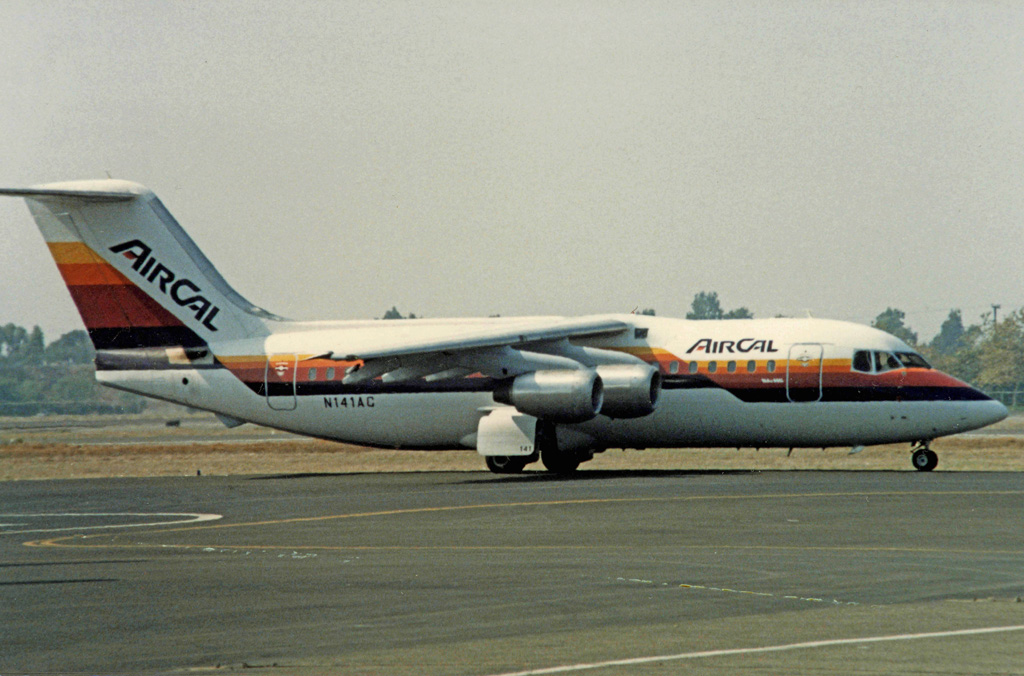
AirCal BAe 146–200 at Orange County airport in 1986

AirCal's fleet remained 737-200s (and two 737-100s), along with seven MD-80s, until it ordered a dozen Boeing 737-300s in 1984, with Boeing agreeing to take back the MD-80s in trade. The 737-300s were even quieter than the MD-80s, and compatible with the 737-100/200s. The last of the MD-80s were gone by early 1986. Noise restrictions as SNA forced AirCal to acquire quieter aircraft. New flight limits introduced in 1985 allowed operational flexibility for aircraft below a specified noise threshold, a category that included the BAe-146s. This would have given PSA a substantial advantage, prompting AirCal to order six.

In the fourth quarter of 1985 AirCal's run of profitability was disrupted by the entry of Continental West into the California Market. Continental West was a short-lived Texas Air subsidiary created to take delivery of aircraft due to limits placed on Continental by its bankruptcy judge. Additional capacity cratered west coast fares once again, leading to 1986 being once again unprofitable. In June 1986, AirCal created a holding company for the airline, ACI Holdings.

In November 1986, AirCal accepted a purchase offer from American Airlines for $225mm, $90mm of which would be split by Lyon and Argyros. American was in the midst of a hub expansion program, then building new (now defunct) hubs in Raleigh, Nashville and San Juan. Building a west coast presence from scratch at the same time was considered a bridge too far for American, so it bought rather than built. Another factor was that Frank Lorenzo's Texas Air was also interested and American was eager to block it. AirCal had achieved a 1985 market share on the LA Basin to SF Bay corridor market of just under 33%, second to PSA which had just less than 49%. AirCal had expanded up the coast to Canada and Alaska and as far east as Chicago with a fleet of 39 aircraft. American's purchase closed May 1, 1987, and AirCal was merged out of existence on July 1. AirCal's long-time rival, PSA, was likewise swallowed by USAir in 1986.

== Legacy ==
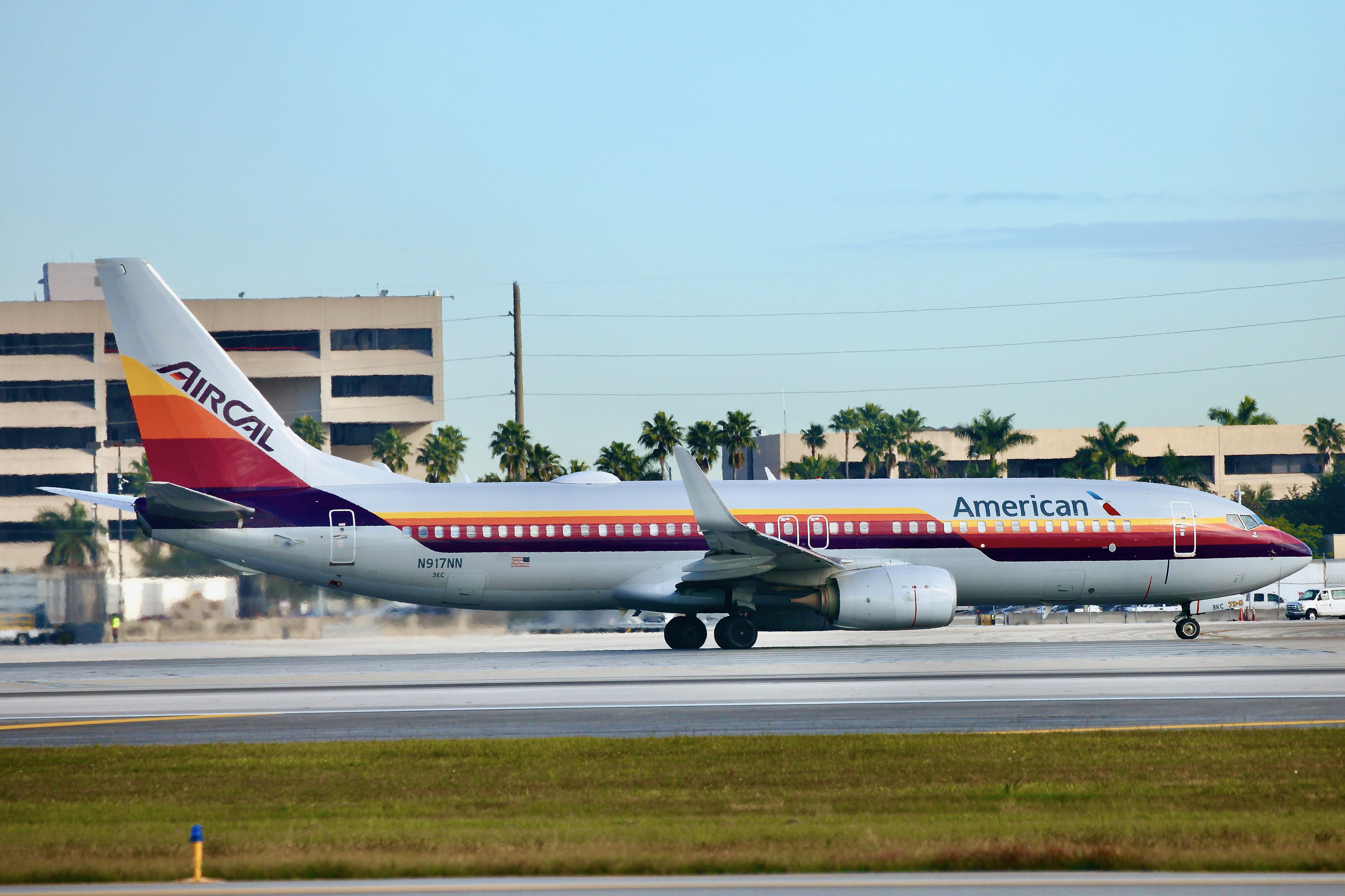
An American Airlines Boeing 737-800 with AirCal heritage livery

In 2015, American Airlines added to its heritage livery series an AirCal Boeing 737-800.

== Incidents and accidents ==
On Tuesday, February 17, 1981, an AirCal Boeing 737-200 crashed while attempting to land at John Wayne Airport. AirCal Flight 336 was a scheduled flight from San Jose International Airport to John Wayne International Airport. Around 48 minutes into the flight, the crew received clearance for a visual approach to land on runway 19R. As Flight 336 was approaching, at high speed and with the engines pulled back to flight idle, another AirCal flight, Flight 931, received clearance to take off from runway 19R. The controller recognized the potential danger of a collision between the two aircraft and ordered Flight 931 to abort takeoff and instructed Flight 336 to go around. Flight 931 immediately aborted its takeoff, however, Flight 336 initially failed to comply and did not go around in time to achieve positive climb and instead touched down on the runway with the landing gear in the process of being retracted. The aircraft left the runway surface around 900 feet (275 m) past the runway threshold, skidded another 1,170 feet (360 m) before finally coming to rest 115 feet (35 m) to the right of the centerline. All passengers and crew members survived the crash. The Boeing 737-293 aircraft, registered N468AC, was damaged beyond repair and consequently written off.

On June 5, 1986, an AirCal 737 flying from Los Angeles to Portland came within 100 feet of a private plane before the AirCal pilot banked to avoid a collision. No crew or passengers were injured during the incident.

== Destinations ==
=== Destinations in May 1987 ===
AirCal's May 1, 1987, system timetable listed the following destinations shortly before it was merged into American Airlines:

- Anchorage, AK (ANC)
- Burbank, CA – now Bob Hope Airport (BUR)
- Chicago, IL – O'Hare Airport (ORD)
- Long Beach, CA (LGB)
- Los Angeles (LAX)
- Oakland, CA (OAK)
- Ontario, CA (ONT)
- Orange County, CA – now John Wayne Airport (SNA)
- Portland, OR (PDX)
- Reno, NV (RNO)
- Sacramento, CA (SMF)
- San Diego, CA (SAN)
- San Francisco, CA (SFO)
- San Jose, CA (SJC)
- Seattle, WA (SEA)
- South Lake Tahoe, CA (TVL)
- Vancouver, B.C., Canada (YVR) – only international destination served by the airline

=== Previously served destinations ===
Air California/AirCal previously served these destinations during its existence:

- Fresno, CA (FAT)
- Las Vegas, NV (LAS)
- Monterey, CA (MRY)
- Palm Springs, CA (PSP)
- Phoenix, AZ (PHX)

== Fleet ==
=== Final fleet ===
As of July 1, 1987, at the time of the merger, AirCal's fleet consisted of the following aircraft:

Air California fleet
Aircraft	In service	Notes
BAe 146-200	6	All were transferred to American Airlines and later retired in 1990.
Boeing 737-100	2	All were transferred to American Airlines and later retired in 1988.
Boeing 737-200	21	One crashed as flight 336 and the rest were transferred to American Airlines and later retired in 1991.
Boeing 737-300	8	All were transferred to American Airlines and later retired in 1992.
Total	37	

=== Retired fleet ===
Air California/AirCal previously operated the following aircraft:

Air California retired fleet
Aircraft	Total	Introduced	Retired	Notes
Lockheed L-188 Electra	7	1967	1980	
McDonnell Douglas DC-9-14	2	1968	1969	Leased from McDonnell Douglas.
McDonnell Douglas MD-81	2	1981	1986	
McDonnell Douglas MD-82	6	1981	1986	

=== Retro Livery ===
American Airlines N917NN was painted with AirCal livery in 2015

== See also ==
- List of defunct airlines of the United States
