= Westgate-California Corporation =

Defunct San Diego corporation for business interests of C. Arnholt Smith

- Type: Public
- Founded: 1956; 70 years ago
- Founder: C. Arnholt Smith
- Defunct: 1982
- Headquarters: San Diego, California, U.S.
- Key people: C. Arnholt Smith

Westgate-California Corporation (WCC) was an American public company and a vehicle for the business interests of C. Arnholt Smith (1899–1996), a San Diego banker, businessman, civic booster, political fundraiser and felon. During its existence, WCC had a substantial impact on California, especially San Diego. Smith was one of the most powerful people in San Diego for decades with interests ranging from the San Diego Padres to property to tuna fishing/packing to airlines to national politics (he was friends with and a major fundraiser/donor for Richard Nixon). Smith's empire, including WCC, unraveled starting in 1973 when his bank was taken over by the FDIC for flagrant violations of banking regulations. This led to the bankruptcy of WCC in 1974, which dragged on for eight years, at times causing significant disruption, at the end of which it liquidated in 1982. Smith was convicted on related embezzlement charges, but served little time due to his advanced age.

== Origin ==
After an early career with Bank of America, Smith bought his own bank, United States National Bank (USNB) in San Diego in 1933 with the help of friends and family. At the time, the USNB had a single branch, assets of $1.7mm and deposits of $800,000. Smith bought it for $50,000. USNB had bad loans outstanding to San Diego businesses, including National Iron Works (today National Steel and Shipbuilding, part of General Dynamics) and the Crystal Pier at Pacific Beach. By foreclosing, Smith assumed control of these businesses, the kernel of what later became WCC.

National Iron Works built some important San Diego structures, such as some of the plants in which Convair manufactured aircraft for World War II. This led Smith to have an interest in real estate and hotels. The National Iron Works also had a shipyard which expanded substantially during World War II. This led to Smith's interest in tuna packing - after the war, the shipyard made some of the first steel-hulled deep-sea purse seiner tuna boats, which led to Smith consolidating local tuna businesses into a vertically integrated operation, controlling both the ships and the canneries. WCC ultimately owned the third largest tuna canning operation in the country, selling under brands like Carnation and Breast-O-Chicken [sic]. One of the tuna canneries was called "Westgate", from which Smith took the name. In the 1950s, tuna was the third-largest business in San Diego, employing 40,000 people.

== Businesses ==
Smith consolidated his businesses under the Westgate-California Corporation, incorporated first in Delaware in 1956, reincorporated in Nevada in 1960. He gave up control of National Steel and Shipbuilding in the 1960s, but otherwise WCC expanded quickly in the 1960s. Smith and his family owned over 50% of the voting stock. By 1973, WCC broadly operated in eight areas. A 1974 corporate directory listed 37 WCC subsidiaries or divisions among these areas. For example:

- Seafood (discussed above)
- Surface transportation: WCC owned Yellow Cab taxi operations in a dozen California cities. In Los Angeles, Oakland, San Jose and San Francisco, those franchises had exclusive rights to pick up at the airport, as did WCC's airport buses. In San Diego, Yellow Cab had to make do with only 88% of the taxis. In Los Angeles, Yellow's monopoly extended to downtown. In 1972, the Yellow Cab business was said to gross $30mm per year (over $200mm in 2024 dollars).
- Air transportation: WCC owned 81% of Air California, then one of two jet intrastate airlines in California (the other being Pacific Southwest Airlines). Smith's private aircraft, a large Lockheed Electra turboprop, was operated by the airline and flew in its colors. WCC was also alleged to control Golden West Airlines, the dominant California commuter carrier. Smith had been forbidden from buying it in 1969 based on his dominance of other modes of California airport transportation, so sold it to a friend, but was viewed as still being in charge.
- Real Estate: WCC had built some of the best shopping centers/malls in Southern California. For instance, Fashion Valley was a joint venture by Westgate-California Realty, built on the site of Westgate Park. Westgate Park was a minor league baseball stadium built by National Steel for Smith when he bought the then minor-league San Diego Padres. When Smith bought Major League Baseball franchise that became the National League Padres, he recycled the site into Fashion Valley. WCC had many other California real estate interests.
- Hotel/resort: WCC had built and owned the Westgate Plaza Hotel. Smith designed it to be one of the finest (it originally had a fleet of Rolls Royce cars to collect guests) in reaction to criticisms of San Diego hotels by, among others, then-President Dwight Eisenhower. Smith also instigated the creation of Shelter Island and its clubs, now home to three yacht clubs. He further owned the downtown Cuyamaca Club, the finest private club of the era.
- Produce
- Leasing
- Insurance: Westgate Life Insurance wrote credit, life and health insurance with $230mm in policies outstanding. Another insurance subsidiary, Westgate-California Insurance, by 1972 was taking premiums from Yellow Cab subsidiaries that had previously self-insured.

In 1972, The New York Times reported WCC as having $190mm in revenues, over $1.5bn in 2024 dollars. WCC was not the only means by which Smith pursued his interests. USNB was a separate holding, as were the Padres.

== Collapse ==
As early as 1962, banking regulators warned Smith about using USNB to fund Smith-related businesses like WCC, and forced Smith to take corrective measures. In 1969, Wall Street Journal reporter Byron Calame wrote a takedown of WCC, Smith and USNB, Self-Dealing Tycoon: How a Californian Uses Publicly Owned Firms to Aid Private Ventures. Calame did an exhaustive search of public records of Smith's dealings, showing that he and his associates profited "handsomely" in their dealings with WCC and USNB, both of which were publicly traded. Calame showed how Smith would buy a property or company for his own account, then mark it up and sell it to Westgate. A steady drip of events and articles ensued, including indictment and imprisonment of one of Smith's long-time associates, and former WCC board-member, John Alessio.

The proximate cause were outside accountants withdrawing their certification of accounts for WCC for 1971 and Air California for 1971 and 1972, at which point the SEC suspended trading in the stocks, pending clarification. The SEC sued to place WCC in receivership, having already had WCC under investigation. Meanwhile, banking investigators had uncovered more trouble at USNB, causing the Comptroller of the Currency to force Smith to step down. Finally, in October 1973, driven in part by an ongoing withdrawal of deposits, the FDIC seized USNB, which by that time was the biggest bank in San Diego, the 10th largest in California with over 60 branches and $1.2bn in assets, based on continued self-dealing by Smith. It was, at the time, the largest bank to ever be taken over by the FDIC. USNB's non-Smith business was assumed by Crocker National Bank (now part of Wells Fargo). Shorn of the support of the bank, WCC was forced into Chapter X bankruptcy by February 1974.

Banking regulators examining USNB after the takeover identified WCC as just one of six main "lines" to whom USNB had provided funding, run by friends or family. Properties and companies would be flipped between groups, creating gains along the way.

== Bankruptcy and disposition ==
Chapter X bankruptcy was an obsolete-as-of-1978 form of bankruptcy in which management was displaced by trustees who managed the business in the interests of shareholders while under court protection. In contrast, in modern Chapter 11 bankruptcy, unless malfeasance is proven, management remains in charge but is obligated to maximize the value of company assets. Chapter X rules were notoriously complex. Cases could drag on for years. By contrast, today's Chapter 11 rules require resolution within 18 months, absent court approval.

WCC's Chapter X bankruptcy lasted until 1982, over eight years, ending in its liquidation. As indicated below, some subsidiary companies started bankruptcy cases of their own. The bankruptcy resulted in literally scores of court cases and appeals. Smith himself was prosecuted, and ultimately (1985) served time for stealing from his companies. He was also personally bankrupted.

Example dispositions of WCC entities:

- The tuna boats were sold early, and ultimately went to Bumble Bee. The cannery business was rebranded to Sun Harbor Industries and was one of the last businesses sold, to several parties including Bumble Bee.
- Yellow Cab ended up in bankruptcy of its own. This caused significant disruption - for a brief time in 1976, Los Angeles was without taxi service as the local Yellow Cab operation was without insurance. Yellow Cab taxi drivers went on strike in San Diego. The taxicab business changed in big California cities in the 1970s out of all recognition. For example, San Diego, San Francisco and Los Angeles all eliminated/reduced the traditional domination that Yellow previously had.
- The nominal owner of Golden West Airlines was forced to buy the company for real. In 1977, while WCC was still in bankruptcy, Air California was merged into WCC, becoming wholly owned. WCC's trustee decided this would be good for WCC, persuaded the bankruptcy judge, and WCC's stock, still trading, was exchanged for remaining outstanding Air California stock, a very anti-intuitive outcome for those familiar with modern Chapter 11. For a time, it was planned that this would be the surviving WCC business, to be turned over to WCC shareholders, but in the event, Air California was sold in 1981 to a pair of Orange County developers, and rebranded as AirCal. By then the airline industry had changed beyond all recognition, having become deregulated in 1979. In 1986, AirCal agreed to merge into American Airlines.
- The Westgate Plaza Hotel was sold in 1974 to Earl Holding's Little America organization, now confusingly known as Grand America. For decades the hotel was known as the Little America Westgate Hotel, but today, while under the ownership of the same family, it is simply the Westgate Hotel.
- Despite the retail apocalypse, Fashion Valley remains a premier shopping center, now under the control of Simon Properties.

Unlike many bankruptcies, WCC ended with shareholders getting a payout, even after all claims (including eight years worth of legal fees) had been paid.
