= Dylan Mulvaney =

American social-media personality, actress, and singer (born 1996)

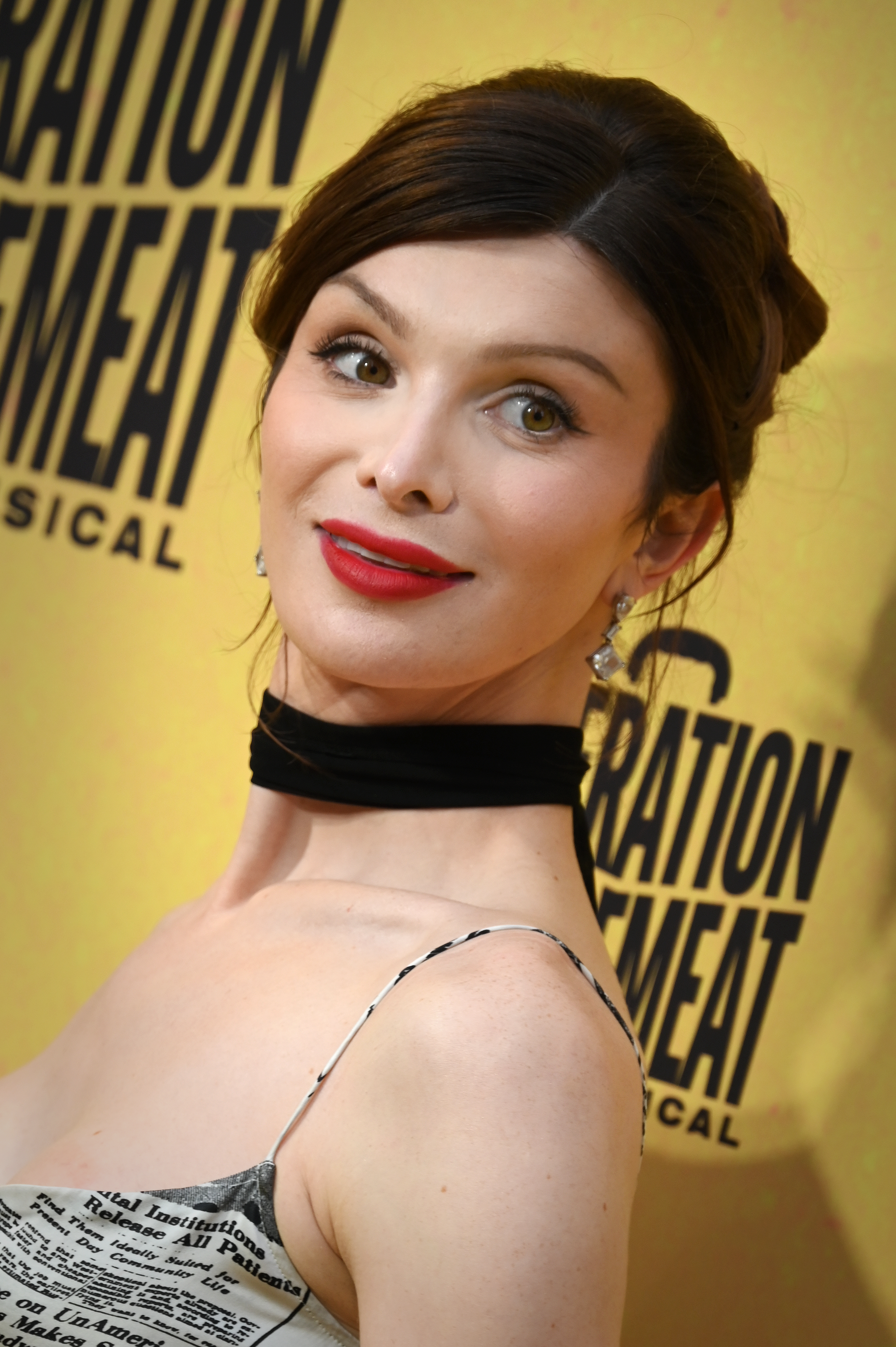
- Mulvaney in 2025
- Born: December 29, 1996 (age 29); San Diego, California, U.S.
- Education: University of Cincinnati (BFA)
- Occupations: Social media personality; actress; comedian; singer; author
- Years active: 2015–present
- Notable work: Paper Doll: Notes from a Late Bloomer
- Relatives: James Mulvaney (grandfather)

Instagram information
- Page: Dylan Mulvaney
- Followers: 1.5 million

TikTok information
- Page: dylanmulvaney
- Followers: 8.9 million
- Last updated: September 28, 2026
- Website: dylanmulvaney.com

Dylan Mulvaney (born December 29, 1996) is an American social media personality, actress, and singer who is best known for detailing her gender transition in daily videos published on TikTok since early 2022. Before coming out as a transgender woman and launching her internet career, Mulvaney performed as a stage actor in Broadway national tours and in Off-Broadway and Old Globe Theatre productions. She gained a higher profile on social media platforms after her interview with U.S. president Joe Biden at the White House in October 2022, during which they spoke about transgender rights. After Bud Light sent a beer can with her face printed on it to Mulvaney for an Instagram promotion in 2023, American conservatives led a boycott of the brand.

By 2023, Mulvaney had more than 10 million followers on TikTok, while her video series, Days of Girlhood, had received over one billion views. In 2023, Mulvaney received a Queerties Groundbreaker Award, a Streamy Award, and Attitude's Woman of the Year Award. She was named to the Forbes 30 Under 30 list in November 2023. In 2024, Mulvaney released her debut single "Days of Girlhood" through the independent digital music distribution service DistroKid, which reached #1 on the Genius lyrics chart within a week of its release. In 2025, Mulvaney released her memoir, Paper Doll: Notes from a Late Bloomer, and returned to acting, with multiple stage appearances and a guest appearance in the Apple TV+ historical drama series The Buccaneers.

== Early life and education ==
Mulvaney was born on December 29, 1996 in San Diego, and grew up in Del Mar Heights and Carmel Valley. She was raised in a devout Catholic family. Mulvaney's father, James F. Mulvaney Jr., is an insurance executive and philanthropist. She is the granddaughter of James F. Mulvaney Sr., an investment banker and attorney who was the president of the United States National Bank of San Diego and the president of the San Diego Padres.

Mulvaney attended Cathedral Catholic High School, where she was a member of the glee club. She graduated from the University of Cincinnati's College-Conservatory of Music in 2019 with a Bachelor of Fine Arts in musical theater.

== Career ==
=== 2015–2022: Acting roles, modeling debut, and social media fame ===
Following her graduation from college, Mulvaney acted in the role of Elder White in the musical The Book of Mormon; the role led her to tour the U.S., Mexico, and Canada. Other acting roles included How The Grinch Stole Christmas! at the Old Globe Theatre; 8 at the Birch North Park Theatre; Next to Normal at Arts Off Broadway; Legally Blonde; Spring Awakening; Bye Bye Birdie; and High School Musical at ACT San Diego.

Around the onset of the COVID-19 pandemic, in 2020, Mulvaney began posting videos to TikTok, which usually garnered a few hundred thousand views. She came out as a trans woman during the pandemic, while living with her "very conservative family" at her childhood home in San Diego, and she began to document her gender transition in a daily series of videos published on TikTok titled "Days of Girlhood" in March 2022, which began to gain in popularity. She said in an interview:

When the pandemic hit, I was doing the Broadway musical Book of Mormon. I found myself jobless and without the creative means to do what I loved. I downloaded TikTok, assuming it was a kids' app. Once I came out as a woman, I made this "day one of being a girl" comedic video. And it blew up. I really don't know another place online like TikTok that can make a creator grow at the rate that it does. Some of these other apps really celebrate perfection and over-editing and flawlessness. I think with TikTok specifically, people love the rawness. They love people just talking to the camera. I try to approach every video like a FaceTime with a friend.

In September 2022, she made her modeling debut at New York Fashion Week walking the runway for Jessica Jade.

In October 2022, Mulvaney appeared with genderfluid hairstylist David Lopez in a podcast for the cosmetics brand Ulta Beauty, during which she spoke about her childhood, her coming out as transgender, and her transition. The video led to the appearance of the hashtag #BoycottUlta in Twitter's trending topics section, and Mulvaney was targeted with transphobic comments. She also became a spokesperson for Kate Spade New York that year.

=== 2022–2023: Joe Biden interview and greater prominence ===
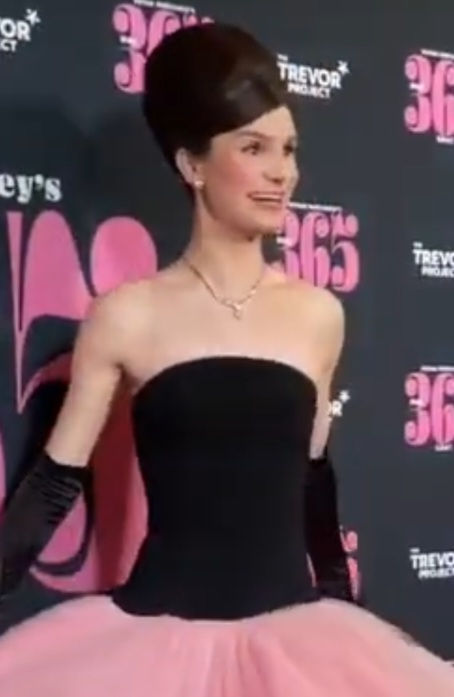
Mulvaney in 2023

Mulvaney met with U.S. president Joe Biden in October 2022 for a presidential forum organized by the online news outlet NowThis News. When asked by Mulvaney about recent legislation restricting gender-affirming care for transgender youth by Republican-led legislatures, Biden called it "outrageous" and "immoral".

According to NBC News, the meeting with Biden led Mulvaney to become the target of a "vitriol campaign" by right-wing activists. Republican senator Marsha Blackburn shared a tweet in which she attached a TikTok video created by Mulvaney and said "Dylan Mulvaney, Joe Biden, and radical left-wing lunatics want to make this absurdity normal". Conservative media personality Caitlyn Jenner, who is also a transgender woman, wrote on Twitter that she agreed with Blackburn's remarks and called Mulvaney's video an absurdity. In a TikTok video, Mulvaney directly addressed being misgendered by Jenner and Jenner's comments about her body, as well as what she had learned from the experience, and left a written message: "To my followers, please do not send her any hate."

In December 2022, Mulvaney confirmed on Instagram that she had undertaken facial feminization surgery. She posted an image of her face on Instagram on January 27, and made her debut on the red carpet at the 65th Annual Grammy Awards on February 5, 2023. In late February, she accepted a Queerties Groundbreaker Award in Hollywood.

Mulvaney hosted a livestreamed variety show at the Rainbow Room in Midtown Manhattan on March 13, 2023, to celebrate the first anniversary of her video series Days of Girlhood, entitled Dylan Mulvaney's Day 365 Live!, with L Morgan Lee and Reneé Rapp as guest stars. An appearance on The Drew Barrymore Show that day in which Mulvaney spoke with Barrymore about "dealing with online hate" resulted in an "onslaught of online hate" directed at Barrymore, according to the Los Angeles Times. On Instagram, Mulvaney shared a letter from U.S. vice president Kamala Harris congratulating her for the first anniversary of her transition.

In September 2023, she walked the runway for The Blonds Spring 2024 collection during New York Fashion Week.

=== 2023: Bud Light advertisement and boycott ===
On April 1, 2023, Mulvaney promoted the beer brand Bud Light in an Instagram video commemorating March Madness, a college basketball tournament held by the NCAA. According to The Washington Post, the advertisement led figures in right-wing media, such as Fox News, to refer to Mulvaney in "disparaging and often in transphobic terms nearly a dozen times over the next three days". Calls for a boycott of Bud Light from conservatives in response to the advertisement also followed. Several Budweiser factories also received bomb threats. On social media, singer Kid Rock published a video of himself shooting several cases of Bud Light with a submachine gun.

Mulvaney also promoted a Nike sports bra in a sponsored post on Instagram in April 2023, and in response, Olympic swimmer Sharron Davies called for a Nike boycott. This was shortly thereafter followed by a backlash and calls for a boycott against makeup company Maybelline after Mulvaney posted a short video of herself applying the company's products.

In response to the events, Mulvaney stated: "What I'm struggling to understand is the need to dehumanize and to be cruel. I just don't think that's right. Dehumanization has never fixed anything in history ever." She explicitly discussed the events for the first time in a video posted in late June, speaking about the stalking and personal attacks she experienced and the lack of contact from the maker of Bud Light in view of the events. She stated, "I'm not telling you this because I want your pity. I'm telling you this because if this is my experience from a very privileged perspective, know that it is much, much worse for other trans people."

In August 2023, Mulvaney won her first Streamy Award for breakout creator. In October 2023, she won the Woman of the Year award from the LGBTQ magazine Attitude. In November 2023, she was named to the Forbes 30 Under 30 list.

In December 2023, Mulvaney released a cover and music video, co-starring Kristofer Thomas, for the song "Blue Christmas".

=== 2024–present: Debut single, memoir, and return to acting ===
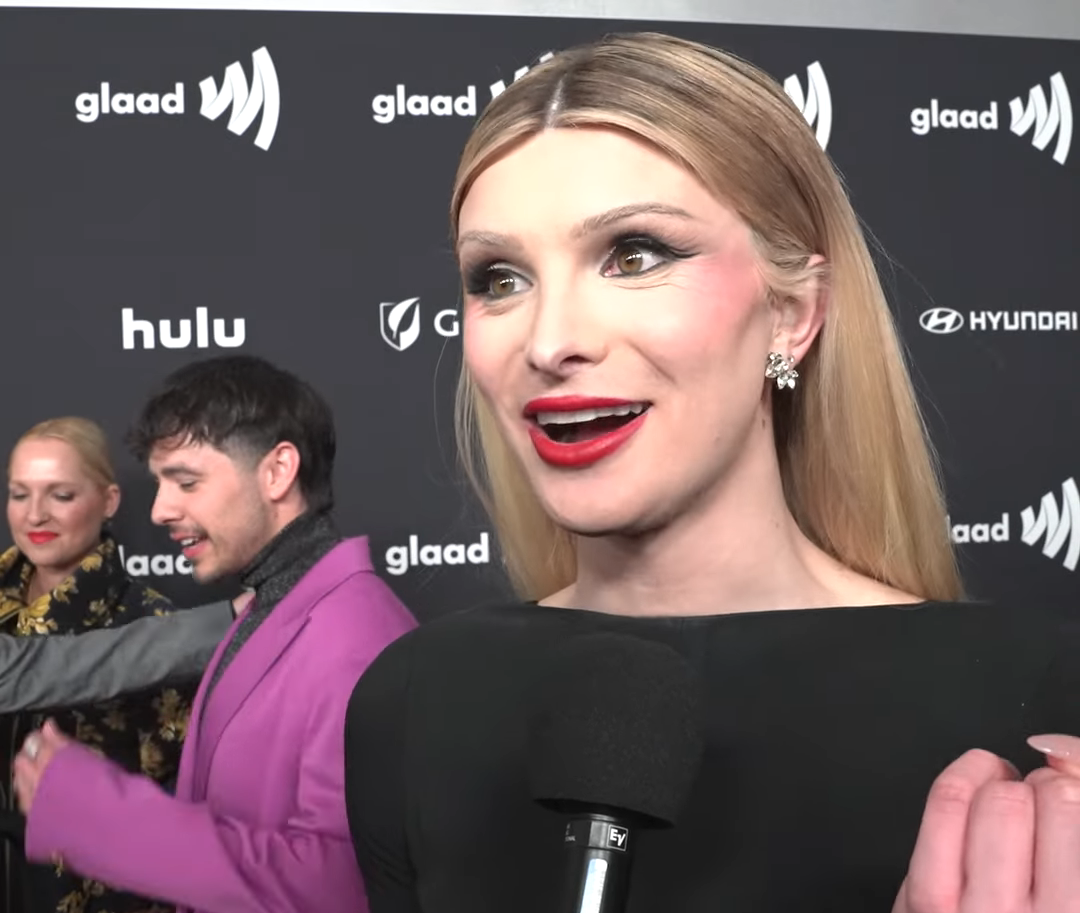
Mulvaney at the 2024 GLAAD Media Awards

On March 11, 2024, Mulvaney released her debut single, "Days of Girlhood". The song, produced by Nick Monson and distributed by independent label DistroKid, reached No. 1 on the Genius lyrics chart within a week of its release. On March 13, 2024, Mulvaney released an official music video for "Days of Girlhood", featuring other transgender influencers such as Gigi Gorgeous Getty and Ve'ondre Mitchell. Mulvaney promised to donate profits from the song to The Trevor Project.

In May 2024, Mulvaney announced that she would debut a new solo musical act entitled FAGHAG at Edinburgh Festival Fringe and playing at Assembly George Square Studios from July 31 to August 25. The musical satirizes her former life as a self-proclaimed twink as well as her public life as a transgender celebrity. When speaking about the narrative of her musical, she stated "I've stopped trying to put myself into so many boxes. Especially early on, I wanted to make everything as simple and clear for people as possible, but I've realized life is a lot more complex than that."

On September 25, 2024, Mulvaney announced her first book Paper Doll: Notes from a Late Bloomer, released on March 11, 2025, as part of a two-book deal with Abrams Image. The book documents Mulvaney's life before and after her transition via journal entries and discusses "things that [she] couldn't talk about online". In April 2025, Mulvaney sang on “Dazzled”, the lead single for the astrology-based concept musical, Retrograde. Mulvaney made a cameo appearance as Miss Bloomingdale in the Apple TV+ series The Buccaneers during the show's second season.

On July 28, 2025, Mulvaney announced that she would be re-staging her one-woman show (formerly titled Faghag) at the Off-Broadway Lucille Lortel Theatre under the new title The Least Problematic Woman in the World. It ran from September 20, 2025, to November 30, 2025. In August 2025, Mulvaney joined the cast of The Drowsy Chaperone, as Kitty, for the Breaking the Binary Theatre's fourth annual festival at Carnegie Hall.

In January 2026 it was announced Mulvaney had been cast in the role of Anne Boleyn in the Broadway production of Six. After the casting was criticized by right wing and gender-critical accounts on social media, the musical's official X account was locked to non-followers. She made her Broadway debut in Six at the Lena Horne Theatre on February 16, 2026.

== Personal life ==
According to her social media profiles, Mulvaney uses both she/her and they/them pronouns. (Note: This article uses she/her pronouns for consistency.)

Mulvaney publicly expressed on her social media platforms that she is still trying to maintain her Catholic faith.

== Discography ==
All credits are adapted from Apple Music and Spotify.

=== Singles ===
==== As lead artist ====
Year	Title	Album	Writer(s)
2024	”The Joke (Live)”	Non-album singles	Dylan Mulvaney
2024	“Days of Girlhood”	Non-album singles	Dylan Mulvaney, Skyler Stonestreet, Nick Monson, Nicholas Paul Monson
2023	"Blue Christmas"	Non-album singles	Billy Hayes, Jay W. Johnson

==== As featured artist ====
Year	Title	Album	Writer(s)	Producer(s)
2025	“Aries (Dazzled)” (Retrograde The Musical featuring Dylan Mulvaney)	Retrograde The Musical (Studio Cast Recording)	Jesse Saint John, Nick Laughlin, Richard Walter	Zhone, Drew Louis

== Filmography ==
=== Television ===
Year	Title	Role	Notes	Ref.
2015	Awkwardness	Mac	1 episode	
2015	The Honest Show	Curtis	1 episode	
2019	Love Not Likes	Dylan	TV short	
2025	The Buccaneers	Miss Bloomingdale	Guest appearance	
2025	The Real Housewives of Orange County	Herself	Guest appearance; 1 episode	

== Bibliography ==
- Paper Doll: Notes from a Late Bloomer (2025)

== See also ==
- List of LGBT people from New York City
- LGBTQ culture in New York City
