= Westgate Hotel (San Diego) =

The Westgate Hotel
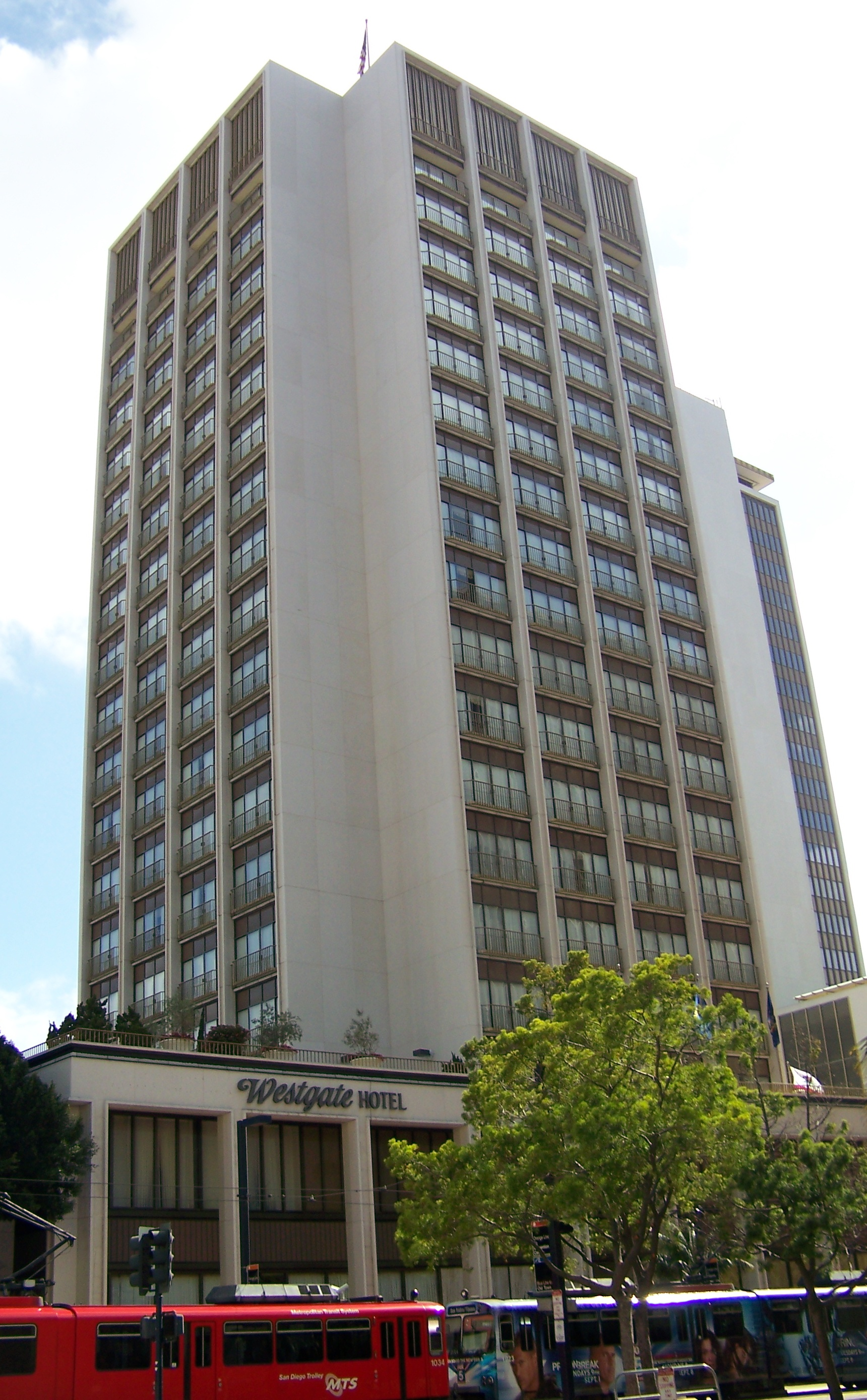
- The building in 2009
- Interactive map of the The Westgate Hotel area
- Former names: Little America Westgate Plaza Hotel; Westgate Plaza Hotel

General information
- Status: Completed
- Location: 1055 Second Ave, San Diego, California, 92101, United States
- Coordinates: 32°42′59″N 117°9′45″W
- Opened: August 30, 1970

Other information
- Number of rooms: 235

Westgate Hotel, formerly known as Westgate Plaza Hotel and Little America Westgate Plaza Hotel, is a luxury hotel in San Diego, California.

== History ==
The hotel was built by C. Arnholt Smith after inspiration from a 1950s lunch with President Dwight D. Eisenhower at the nearby U.S. Grant Hotel. Construction began on January 18, 1968, and Arnholt's company Westgate-California Corporation built it for $22 million. The 20 story building opened with 235 rooms on August 30, 1970 and Esquire said it was one of the three greatest hotels in the world.

== In popular culture ==
The hotel was a filming location for the 1979 film Scavenger Hunt and the 2025 film One Battle After Another.
