= Days of Girlhood =

2024 single by Dylan Mulvaney

Single by Dylan Mulvaney
- Released: March 11, 2024
- Genre: Pop
- Length: 2:58
- Songwriters: Dylan Mulvaney; Nick Monson; Skyler Stonestreet
- Producer: Nick Monson

Music video
- "Days of Girlhood" on YouTube

"Days of Girlhood" is the debut single by American singer and social media personality Dylan Mulvaney. The song was produced by Nick Monson and self-released through DistroKid on March 11, 2024. The song reached #1 on the Genius lyrics chart within a week of its release.

== Background and release ==
Dylan Mulvaney was previously known for her TikTok series "Days of Girlhood," where she detailed her experience with transitioning. Her song of the same name references this series and describes her new life as a girl. It was co-written by Mulvaney, Nick Monson, and Skyler Stonestreet. Mulvaney's song is heavily inspired by popular culture from the 2000s. Later, when speaking about the song, Mulvaney promised to donate any profits to The Trevor Project.

== Music video ==
On March 13, 2024, Dylan Mulvaney released an official music video for "Days of Girlhood." Billboard described the video as having "a strong commitment to pink" with a "Barbiecore" aesthetic. Mulvaney appears alongside fellow transgender influencers such as Gigi Gorgeous and Ve'ondre Mitchell and other celebrities including Loren Gray, Heather Dubrow, Our Lady J, Josie Totah, and Nick Adams.

== Reception ==
The song reached #1 on the Genius lyrics chart within a week of its release. Following the song's release, several conservative commentators (including Robby Starbuck and Liz Wheeler) and social media users criticized the song, arguing that Mulvaney's lyrics about boys, pills, and shopping were indicative of her not understanding girlhood and viewing it through an outdated or reductive lens. Mulvaney responded that her intention was simply to celebrate the girlhood she previously had been unable to experience, and that her fans should understand that she had no bad intentions. Lady Gaga also defended Mulvaney in a post on Instagram.
