= Westgate Park =

Ballpark in San Diego, California

- Location in California Location in the United States
- Interactive map of Westgate Park
- Address: Friars Road at State Route 163; San Diego, California; US
- Coordinates: 32°46′9″N 117°9′48″W
- Owner: C. Arnholt Smith
- Capacity: 8,268
- Record attendance: 15,229

Construction
- Opened: April 28, 1958
- Closed: 1967
- Demolished: 1969
- Cost: $1 million

Tenant
- San Diego Padres (PCL) 1958–1967

Westgate Park was a ballpark in San Diego, California. It was the home of the San Diego Padres of the Pacific Coast League (PCL) from 1958 to 1967. The ballpark was located in the largely undeveloped Mission Valley region of San Diego. The location was on Friars Road at US Route 395 (now State Route 163), in the northeast corner of what is now Fashion Valley Mall.

== History ==
Westgate was built to replace the deteriorating Lane Field, where the minor-league Padres had played since 1936. Constructed for $1 million in private funds by Padres owner C. Arnholt Smith, Westgate was a modern ballpark with a capacity of 8,268 fans, with an eye to be expanded to major league size (up to 40,000) if necessary.

In 1958 when it opened, "Not even Yankee Stadium or Boston's Fenway Park can surpass the comforts and conveniences of the Padres' new home. ... This is a real ballpark, built for the game of baseball, a ballpark in which the city of San Diego can take great pride." It was named for the Westgate-California Tuna Packing Corporation.

The first Padres games played in Westgate were on April 28, 1958, a day-night doubleheader versus the Phoenix Giants. Actor William Powell threw out the first pitch. San Diego won the first game, 5-3, and the second, 3-1. The afternoon game attracted 4,619 fans, while the nightcap attracted 7,129 fans.

The American Football League's San Diego Chargers demanded a new stadium to replace Balboa Stadium, a structure dating from about 1915. With major league baseball soon to arrive, the city decided to build a single, multi-purpose stadium for both baseball and football. The new facility was initially called San Diego Stadium. This ended the possibility of expansion for Westgate.

The final game played at Westgate Park on September 3, 1967, drew a record crowd of 15,229.

The minor league Padres played the 1968 season in the new stadium, knowing they were a lame duck, with the major league San Diego Padres set to begin play the next year. Plans for Fashion Valley Mall were unveiled in December 1967, and Westgate was razed by 1969 to make room.
