= Maria Helen Alvarez =

American businesswoman

Maria Helen Alvarez (July 4, 1921 – January 22, 2010) was the first female CEO in television and was one of the original financial backers of the Disneyland Hotel in California. She became a millionaire by the age of 29, and was a pioneer in the TV industry.

== Personal life ==
Alvarez was born Maria Helen Harman on July 4, 1921, in Tulsa, Oklahoma. Her parents were Orlin and Edna Mae Harman.

Alvarez was married three times. Her first husband was Joseph Alvarez whom she married in the 1940s. Her second husband was John Hill with whom she built the Tulsa Station in the 1960s. Finally, in the 1970s, she married C. Arnholt Smith. Her third union was perceived by many as controversial, since Smith had been convicted of grand theft and tax evasion in connection with the collapse of his U.S. National Bank. Alvarez had one child named Joseph Thomas Alvarez III.

Alvarez spent most of her life in La Jolla, a community in the city of San Diego, California. Later, in her senior years, she moved to Rancho Santa Fe. She died of natural causes at the age of 88 in her home in Rancho Santa Fe, California.

== Career beginnings ==
Maria Helen Alvarez Smith began her career in broadcasting by doing odd jobs and secretarial tasks at a Tulsa radio station in the 1940s. One day, the regular newscaster was absent from her slot, so she volunteered to report the news. Before long, her superiors recognized her potential and she was regularly reading stories for the station, many of which focused on the emerging television industry.

While at the Tulsa radio station, Alvarez gained technical experience for what was to become her career in TV. She read everything she could find about TV, visiting 42 of the 89 TV stations that were on air throughout America. In her spare time, she took correspondence courses in electronic engineering and received the Federal Communications Commission license needed to build a television station.

== Tulsa TV history ==
In 1950, it was Maria Helen Alvarez who brought TV to Tulsa, Oklahoma, creating the foundation on which KOTV currently stands. In the 1940s, people were not familiar with the concept of television. Alvarez, who had seven years prior experience in radio, pioneered TV, encouraging George Cameron to "take a chance on TV." She was just 27 years old at the time. She totally revolutionized the station headquarters, turning it from a converted tractor shop to "the nation's largest TV broadcast center at the time." With her design, the studio had 22-feet high ceilings and doors wide enough to enable the entrance of "parade floats and elephants."

== Criticism and controversy ==
Alvarez was the subject of much criticism throughout her media career. Station employees felt she was too frugal in her spending for the Tulsa station, impacting them negatively. According to Harry Volkman, there was one woman in particular who "was angry when she heard [she] was leaving. She said 'If Helen Alvarez wouldn't spend so much money on her boyfriends and more on the talent, we might keep some good people in this town!'"

In 1957, Alvarez sued her business partners for $10 million in a civil suit. She accused them of conspiring to defraud her. It was allegedly San Diego's "largest lawsuit" in a federal court. A year later the matter was settled out of court.

== Recognition ==
Life Magazine profiled her and dubbed Alvarez "Helen of Tulsa". She also became known as "The Mother of Tulsa TV". She was also the first female CEO in TV and a millionaire by the time she was 29.

== Walt Disney ==
During the construction of Disneyland, Walt Disney was low on money. He wanted to have a hotel built at the exit of Disneyland but did not have the funds to build one. Walt Disney reached out to his friend, Jack Wrather, to help him out and build a hotel. Jack Wrather and Alvarez were in a partnership, and the Wrather-Alvarez company built the Disneyland Hotel. After an acrimonious end of Wrather and Alvarez's business relationship, Jack Wrather bought out the Alvarez shares of the Wrather-Alvarez company.

== Other interests ==
Alvarez had many interests, including broadcasting, horse racing, oil, politics, and commercial real estate. She was a delegate to the 1964 Republican convention in San Francisco. In the 1980s, she acquired Imperial Airlines.

Alvarez played an active role in the Del Mar Thoroughbred Club, the California Thoroughbred Breeders Association and the Scripps Foundation board. She was a member of the La Jolla Beach and Tennis Club, the Republican State Central Committee of California, and Charter 100.
