= William Lyon (general) =

American military general (1923–2020)

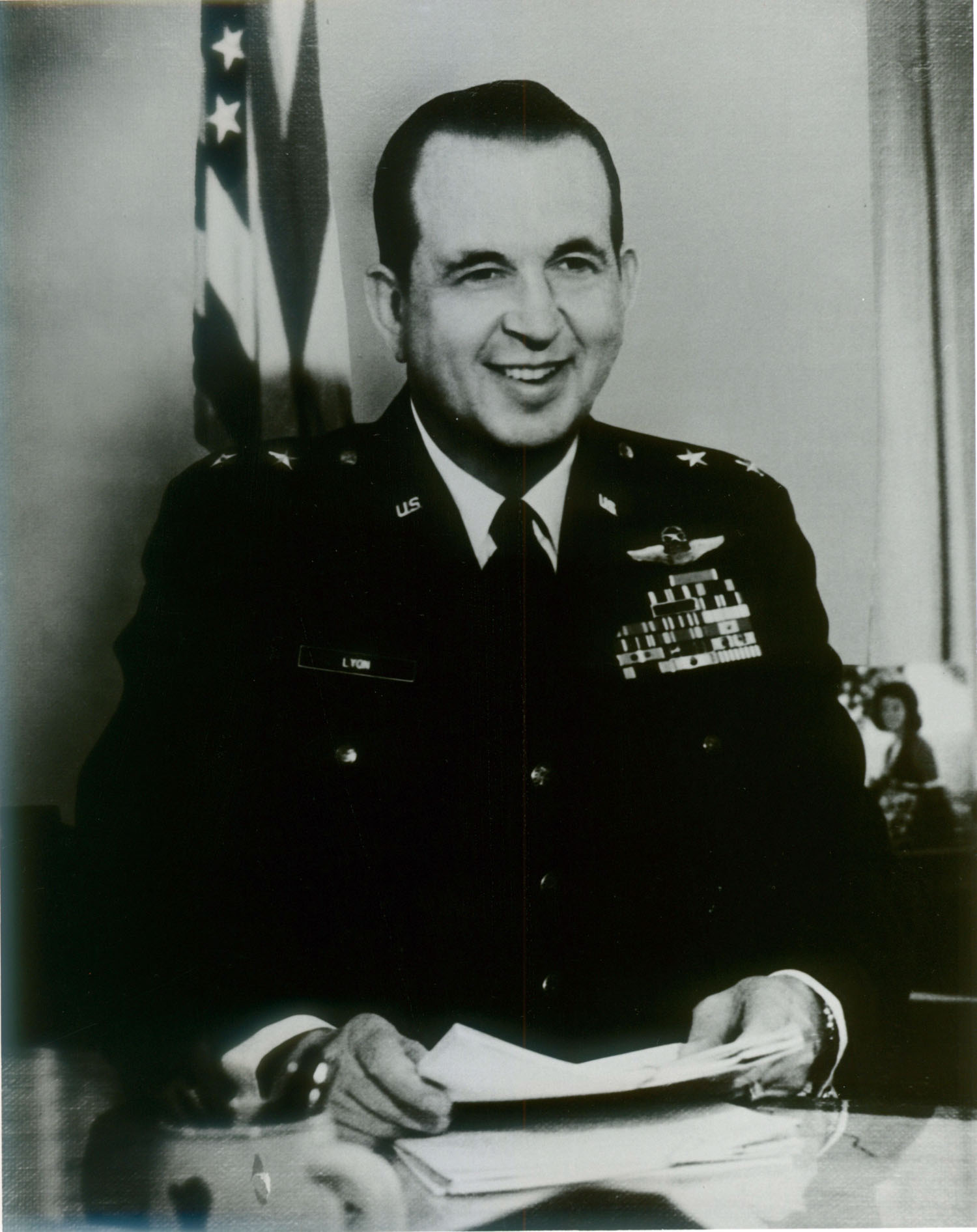
- Born: March 9, 1923; Los Angeles, California, US
- Died: May 22, 2020 (aged 97); Coto de Caza, California, US
- Military career
- Allegiance: United States of America
- Branch: United States Air Force
- Service years: 1943–1978
- Rank: Major General
- Awards: Order of the Sword, Legion of Merit, Distinguished Flying Cross, Air Medal with two oak leaf clusters, Presidential Unit Citation, Air Force Outstanding Unit Award, Combat Readiness Medal, Armed Forces Reserve Medal with hour glass device, Republic of Korea Presidential Unit Citation

William Lyon (March 9, 1923 – May 22, 2020) was a major general of the United States Air Force who served as Commander of the United States Air Force Reserve Command, Headquarters U.S. Air Force, Washington D.C., and commander, Headquarters Air Force Reserve, a separate operating agency located at Robins Air Force Base, Georgia. As chief of Air Force Reserve, Lyon served as the principal adviser on Reserve matters to the Air Force Chief of Staff. As commander of AFRES, he had full responsibility for the supervision of U.S. Air Force Reserve units around the world.

== Biography ==
Lyon was born in Los Angeles, California in 1923. Prior to entering the U.S. Army Air Corps in 1943, he attended the University of Southern California, studying business, and the Dallas Aviation School and Air College. He completed the Air War College in 1971 and the Air National Guard and Air Force Reserve Senior Officers Orientation Course in 1972 and 1974. Additionally, he attended the Industrial College of the Armed Forces National Seminar in 1973.

Lyon enlisted in the U.S. Army Air Corps as a reservist in 1943 and continued serving as a civilian flight instructor until he received a direct appointment as a flight officer in June 1944. During World War II, he was assigned to the 6th Ferrying Group and ferried aircraft to the Pacific and European theaters. In 1945 he was assigned to the North African Division of the Air Transport Command, returning to the United States in 1946. In 1947 he was commissioned as a second lieutenant, transferring from the U.S. Army Air Forces to the newly established U.S. Air Force that became a separate military service that same year. He then participated in various Reserve assignments until his voluntary recall to active duty in 1951. He was then assigned to Headquarters, Air Training Command (ATC) as a staff pilot and was later transferred to the Military Air Transport Service (MATS), flying air evacuation and ferrying missions. In 1953 he volunteered for a tour of duty in Korea and flew 75 combat missions in the C-46 Commando and C-47 Skytrain.

From 1954 to 1963, Lyon was assigned to various positions in the Air Force Reserve and served as a flight commander and operations officer. In 1963 he was named commander of the 929th Tactical Airlift Squadron, March Air Force Base, California, and subsequently served as commander of the parent unit, the 943d Tactical Airlift Group. Lyon was assigned as mobilization assistant to the commander, Sacramento Air Materiel Area, McClellan Air Force Base, California, in June 1970 and, in February 1972, he became Mobilization Assistant to the Commander, Fifteenth Air Force at March Air Force Base. In March 1974 he was appointed Mobilization Assistant to the Commander in Chief, Strategic Air Command (SAC), Offutt Air Force Base, Nebraska, where he was involved in the planning of the transfer of designated KC-135 Stratotanker air refueling units to the Air Force Reserve and Air National Guard. In April 1975 Lyon was ordered to active duty to serve as Chief of Air Force Reserve, Headquarters U.S. Air Force, Washington, D.C.

Lyon was a USAF Command Pilot. His military decorations and awards included the Legion of Merit, Distinguished Flying Cross, Air Medal with two oak leaf clusters, Presidential Unit Citation, Air Force Outstanding Unit Award, Combat Readiness Medal, Armed Forces Reserve Medal with hourglass devices, and the Republic of Korea Presidential Unit Citation. He was promoted to the grade of major general on April 24, 1974, with date of rank May 24, 1972. He retired on April 16, 1979.

== Other work ==
Lyon established the William Lyon Homes Inc. real estate company in 1954, based in Newport Beach. He was a founding chairman of the Commercial Bank of California. Since 2016, his son William H. Lyon has been the chairman of the real estate business, as well as involved with the William Lyon Financial subsidiary and on the board of directors for the California bank.

In 1981, Lyon and fellow Orange County developer George Argyros bought Newport Beach-based airline AirCal, controlling it until its sale to American Airlines in 1987.

Lyon founded the Lyon Air Museum at the John Wayne Airport in Orange County, California.
