= Lyon Air Museum =

American aircraft museum

- Established: 2009
- Location: Santa Ana, California, United States
- Coordinates: 33.67347°N 117.8732°W
- Type: Aerospace museum
- Founder: Major General William Lyon
- Website: lyonairmuseum.org

The Lyon Air Museum is an aerospace museum located on the west side of the John Wayne Airport in Santa Ana, California, United States. The museum features military aircraft, rare automobiles, military vehicles and motorcycles, and related memorabilia, with an emphasis on World War II.

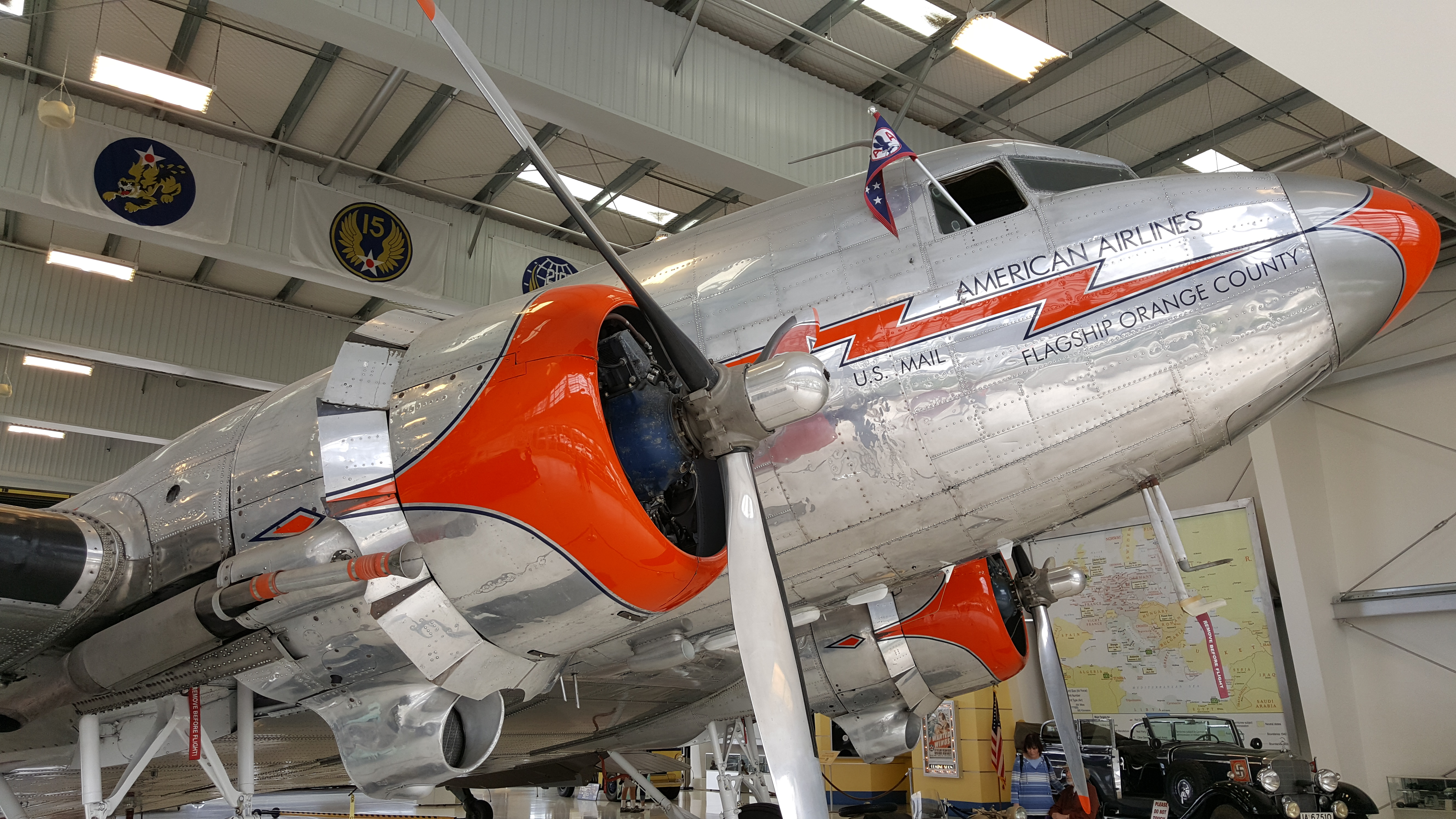
Douglas DC-3 on display

== Aircraft ==
Eight airworthy condition aircraft are on display:

- Boeing B-17 Flying Fortress
- Cessna O-1E Bird Dog
- Douglas DC-3
- Douglas C-47 Skytrain
- North American B-25 Mitchell
- Douglas A-26 Invader
- North American SNJ-6 Texan, added in summer of 2013
- Boeing Stearman PT13D

== Special summer car exhibits ==
Each year Lyon Air Museum hosts its annual Summer Car Exhibit that features a number of cars that are based on a specific theme.

== See also ==
- List of aviation museums
