= Scavenger Hunt =

1979 film by Michael Schultz

- Theatrical release poster
- Directed by: Michael Schultz
- Screenplay by: Steven A. Vail; Henry Harper
- Story by: Steven A. Vail
- Produced by: Steven A. Vail
- Starring: Richard Benjamin; James Coco; Scatman Crothers; Ruth Gordon; Cloris Leachman; Cleavon Little; Roddy McDowall; Robert Morley; Richard Mulligan; Tony Randall; Dirk Benedict; Willie Aames; Stephanie Faracy; Stephen Furst; Richard Masur; Vincent Price
- Cinematography: Ken Lamkin
- Edited by: Christopher Holmes
- Music by: Billy Goldenberg
- Production company: Melvin Simon Productions
- Distributed by: 20th Century Fox
- Release date: December 21, 1979
- Running time: 116 minutes
- Country: United States
- Language: English
- Budget: $7.0 million

Scavenger Hunt is a 1979 American comedy film with a large ensemble cast which includes Richard Benjamin, James Coco, Scatman Crothers, Ruth Gordon, Cloris Leachman, Cleavon Little, Roddy McDowall, Robert Morley, Richard Mulligan, Tony Randall, Dirk Benedict, Willie Aames, Stephanie Faracy, Stephen Furst, Richard Masur, and Vincent Price. The film was directed by Michael Schultz, and released by 20th Century Fox. It includes an appearance by Arnold Schwarzenegger, and features cameos by Meat Loaf and Vincent Price.

Filming took place in and around San Diego, California, incorporating local landmarks such as Westgate Hotel, Balboa Park and the Centre City Building.

== Plot ==
Milton Parker, an eccentric game inventor, dies after losing a video game with his nurse. Parker's greedy and estranged relatives show up at his mansion for the reading of his will. Lawyer Charles Bernstein tells them that the winner of a scavenger hunt will inherit the $200 million estate. The potential beneficiaries form five teams and get involved in various misadventures.

The five teams consist of:

1. Parker's widowed son-in-law Henry Motley and his four children.
2. The servants: French cook Henri, valet Jenkins, limo driver Jackson and French maid Babbette.
3. Dim-witted taxi driver Marvin Dummitz.
4. Parker's widowed sister Mildred Carruthers, her attorney Stuart Sellsome, and her son Georgie.
5. Nephews Kenny and Jeff Stevens, and Mildred's step-daughter Lisa.

Each group is given a list containing clues to acquire 100 items with various point values ranging from 5 to 100 points. The items are to be acquired by any means necessary, with the exception of being purchased. They are to be placed in five different pens on the grounds of the estate. The winner of the scavenger hunt will be the person or team to acquire the most points by 5 p.m. that day. Chaos and carnage ensue, with scavengers returning occasionally to the Parker mansion to deposit items under the supervision of Bernstein and the scorekeeper, Cornfeld.

Mildred, Stuart and Georgie's adventure has them trying to win a stuffed toy bear at a local carnival, trying to haul a heavy safe out of Stuart's office building, and stealing the false teeth of a Native American. Stuart gets roughed up by a motorcycle gang led by Scum after attempting to steal a stuffed fox tail off one of the gang's motorcycles. Late in the game, the team steals items from the servants and the Stevens/Lisa teams.

The servants' adventure has them stealing a toilet from a fancy hotel, partaking in a robbery at a convenience store to steal a cash register and getting locked in a university laboratory while trying to steal a microscope.

Kenny, Jeff and Lisa's adventure has them "borrowing" items such as the head of Jack from a Jack in the Box restaurant, recruiting an obese Duane, although they soon discard him. A bulletproof vest is borrowed from a self-defense-obsessed lady named Arvilla and they acquire "laughing gas," steal a uniform from a motorcycle cop, and get stuck in a football team's locker room trying to steal a helmet.

Dummittz' adventure has him trying unsuccessfully to steal a Rolls-Royce front grille and getting run over many times while trying to replicate an insurance scam he witnesses. A bridal shop security guard named Sam catches him attempting to steal a bridal dress. Sam joins the hunt. Together they steal a knight's suit of armor from a museum, with Marvin dressing up as a mummy and Sam putting on the armor. Sam, knocked unconscious, is stolen by the Mildred-Stuart-Georgie team.

Motley's adventure has him attempting to make his kids proud while acquiring a beehive, a life preserver and a parachute. Motley tries to get a medicine ball from a gym and to impress the instructor Lars, which gets Motley thrown out of a second floor window trying to catch a medicine ball thrown to him.

Each team steals an ostrich from the San Diego Zoo, much to the dismay of the zookeeper. This leads to a car chase back to the Parker mansion. The three remaining teams give up their individual chances to win in order to help Kenny, Jeff and Lisa win against the unethical Mildred-Stuart-Georgie team. With seconds to go, Sam, still wearing the armor, crawls out of the Carruthers' pen and into the other pen to win the contest for the Stevens brothers and Lisa. The victors decide to share their new wealth with the rest, except for Mildred, Stuart and Georgie, who are being chased away by the native American looking for his false teeth.

== Cast ==
- Richard Benjamin as Stuart Selsome
- James Coco as Henri
- Scatman Crothers as Sam
- Ruth Gordon as Arvilla Droll
- Cloris Leachman as Mildred Carruthers
- Cleavon Little as Jackson
- Roddy McDowall as Jenkins
- Robert Morley as Charles Bernstein
- Richard Mulligan as Marvin Dummitz
- Tony Randall as Henry Motley
- Dirk Benedict as Jeff Stevens
- Willie Aames as Kenny Stevens
- Stephanie Faracy as Babbette
- Stephen Furst as Merle
- Richard Masur as Georgie Carruthers
- Meat Loaf as Scum
- Pat McCormick as Carnival Barker
- Vincent Price as Milton Parker
- Avery Schreiber as Zookeeper
- Arnold Schwarzenegger as Lars
- Liz Torres as Lady Zero
- Carol Wayne as Nurse
- Stuart Pankin as Duane
- Maureen Teefy as Lisa
- Missy Francis as Jennifer Motley
- Julie Anne Haddock as Michelle Motley
- David Hollander as Jason Motley
- Shane Sinutko as Scott Motley
- Henry Polic II as Naked Policeman
- Hal Landon Jr. as Cornfield
- Marji Martin as Kay
- Jerado Decordovier as Indian
- Emory Bass as Hotel Manager
- Byron Webster as Restroom Attendant

== Reception ==
Scavenger Hunt did not receive good reviews. The Chicago Tribune's Gene Siskel termed the film "excruciatingly dull", observing that "Coco and Little disconnect a toilet; Randall gets knocked down by a safe; Benjamin steals items from another team. Isn't that a scream? Are your sides splitting?" Janet Maslin of The New York Times wrote, "When a movie's jokes are so noticeably without punch lines, only a mood of uproarious confusion can save the day. Mr. Schultz takes an orderly approach that only makes the movie more of a mess."

People wrote that "An all-star cast [...] plays unsuccessfully for laughs". TV Guide called the film "An all-star, all-stupid comedy attempt that proves, once again, no actor can triumph over bad material."

Allmovie called it an "utterly wretched comedy". DVD Talk opined that the film is "Not at all good, but almost fascinating for its cast and the wrongheadedness of its approach to comedy." Blu-ray.com wrote, "It's a silly endeavor, but it's also exhausting to watch, with its inherent harmlessness evolving into a threat as the one-dimensional picture is stretched over nearly two hours of screen time."

== Home media ==
Scavenger Hunt was first issued on video cassette (both Beta and VHS formats) in 1983 by CBS/Fox Video. It was released on DVD and Blu-ray on January 10, 2017.

== See also ==
- It's a Mad, Mad, Mad, Mad World
- List of media set in San Diego
- Midnight Madness
- Million Dollar Mystery
- Rat Race
