= Paper Doll: Notes from a Late Bloomer =

2025 memoir by Dylan Mulvaney

- Author: Dylan Mulvaney
- Audio read by: Dylan Mulvaney
- Language: English
- Genre: Memoir
- Publisher: Abrams Image
- Publication date: 2025
- Publication place: United States
- Media type: Print, ebook
- Pages: 272
- ISBN: 9781419770395

Paper Doll: Notes from a Late Bloomer is a 2025 memoir written by American transgender TikTok celebrity Dylan Mulvaney that documents her life before and after gender transition.

== Synopsis ==
The book documents Mulvaney's life prior to, during, and after her gender transition; focusing on the highs and lows of her life throughout those time periods.

== Critical reception ==
USA Today, "It's both laugh-out-loud funny and powerfully honest--and is a love letter to everyone who stands up for queer joy."

The New York Times, "For her book, Ms. Mulvaney showed a bawdier side. (Hookups are recounted, sometimes in detail.)"

Rolling Stone, "Paper Doll is eloquent and occasionally wrenching about the desire to get out — out of toxic situations, out of the view of paparazzi, and out of one’s own head. It’s the journey of someone who dreamed of the spotlight but got burned by it."

New York Post, "Mulvaney is indeed picture perfect — as a portrait of the fallacy of woke culture: that a generation was told that the world will morph to them. They will be affirmed and hugged at every turn, despite the obvious truth."
