= United States National Bank of San Diego =

Largest bank in San Diego until seized by FDIC in 1973

United States National Bank of San Diego (USNB) was a large California bank seized by the Federal Deposit Insurance Corporation (FDIC) in 1973 due to the malfeasance of its owner, C. Arnholt Smith (1899–1996). It was, at the time, the largest bank ever seized by the FDIC. USNB's assets and domestic branches were taken over by Crocker National Bank, which later merged into Wells Fargo.

== Origin ==
Smith grew up in San Diego from age 7. He dropped out of high school but had a successful early career in banking, including at Bank of America. In 1933, with the assistance of family and friends, he purchased USNB for $50,000, which at the time had a single branch, $800,000 in deposits and $1.7mm in assets.

USNB came with business interests that formed the nucleus of a substantial business empire for Smith, most of which he gathered into the Westgate-California Corporation (WCC), a large conglomerate pursuing everything from airlines to tuna canneries to hotels, property, taxis, buses and more. Smith bought the minor league San Diego Padres and later transferred the name to the National League expansion team, of which he was the original owner. He appointed James Mulvaney, who was the president of the bank, as the president of the Padres. Smith became one of the most powerful people in San Diego, influential in politics. He was a long-time friend of and fundraiser for Richard Nixon, for instance. National Steel and Shipbuilding (now part of General Dynamics) was another part of his empire.

The core of his operation was USNB, which, by 1973, grew to $1.2bn in assets (over $9bn in 2024 dollars) and over 60 branches, making the publicly owned financial company the largest bank in San Diego and the 10th largest in California.

== Collapse ==
Smith had engaged in long term, flagrant and substantial self-dealing. By the early 1970s, USNB, WCC and other Smith entities were under investigation by the U.S. Securities and Exchange Commission and the Office of the Comptroller of the Currency. In October 1973, driven in part by an ongoing withdrawal of deposits, the FDIC seized USNB, based on continued self-dealing by Smith. It was, at the time, the largest bank to ever be taken over by the FDIC. USNB's non-Smith business was assumed by Crocker National Bank (now part of Wells Fargo). Shorn of the support of the bank, WCC was forced into Chapter X bankruptcy by February 1974.

Smith was ultimately convicted of stealing $9mm from USNB. By the time he served time he was imprisoned, he served only eight months due to age, leaving jail in 1985.
