= Lane Field (baseball) =

Baseball venue in San Diego, California

- Location within California Location within the United States
- Interactive map of Lane Field
- Address: N. Harbor Drive and W. Broadway; San Diego, California
- Coordinates: 32.716659°N 117.172217°W
- Capacity: 8,000 (1936); 9,000 to 12,000
- Record attendance: 13,466 (May 2, 1948)
- Field size: Originally; Left field 339 ft (103 m); Center field 480 ft (150 m); Right field 355 ft (108 m); Later; Left field 329 ft (100 m); Center field 426 ft (130 m); Right field 330 ft (100 m)

Construction
- Built: 1936
- Opened: March 31, 1936
- Closed: September 8, 1957
- Cost: $20,000
- Builder: Works Progress Administration

Tenant
- San Diego Padres (PCL) 1936–1957

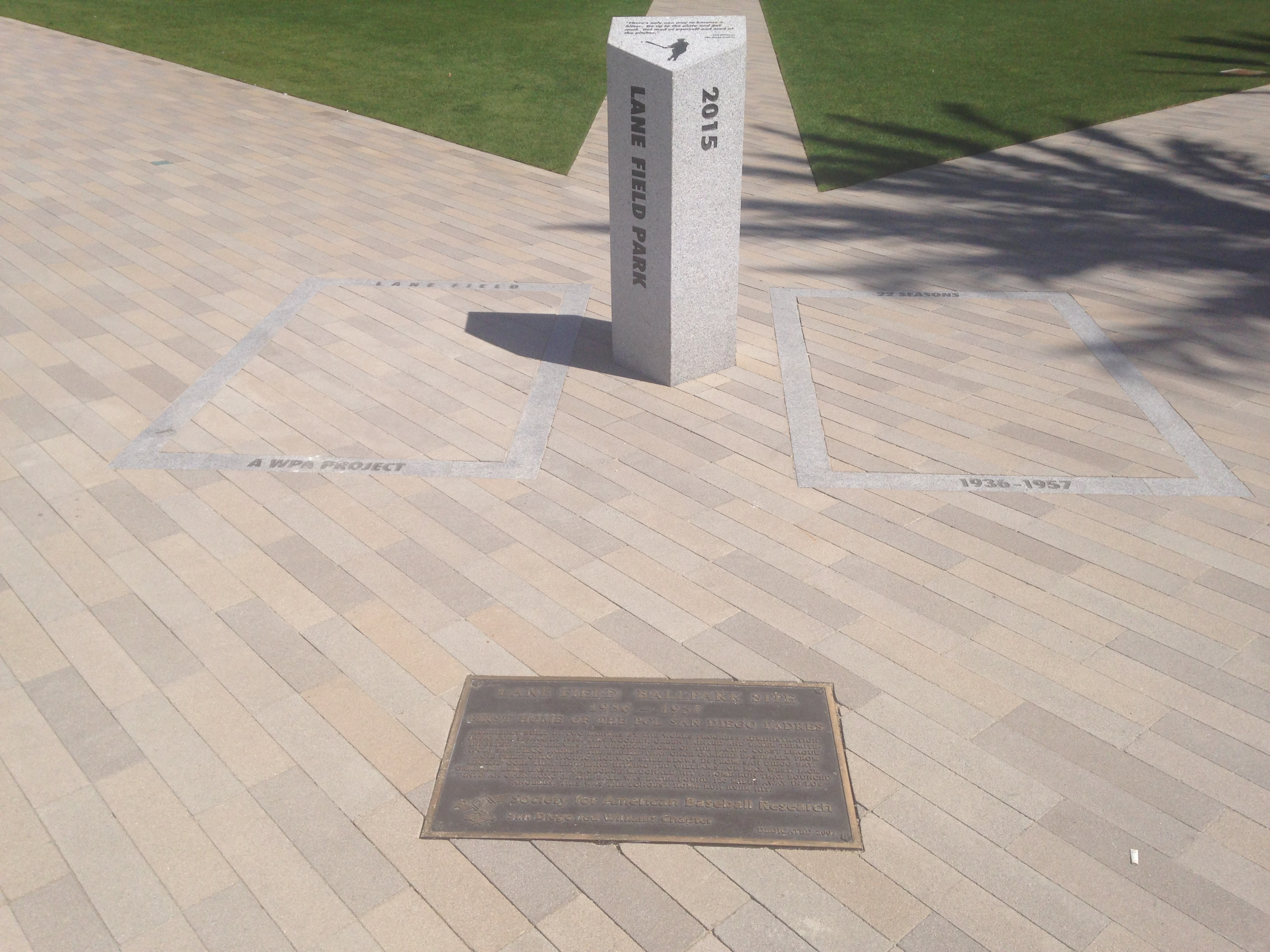
Lane Field 2015

Lane Field was a ballpark in San Diego, California. It was the home of the San Diego Padres of the Pacific Coast League (PCL) from 1936 to 1957. The ballpark was located in downtown San Diego, at the end of West Broadway near the waterfront. Broadway bounded the park to the south (first base). Its other two close bounding streets were Harbor Drive (third base) and Pacific Highway (right field). There were various buildings to the north (left field) between the ballpark and Ash Street.

== History ==
Before it was called Lane Field, the ballpark began its life as a U.S. Navy athletic field in 1925. Two years later, football bleachers were added. The field also had a track, used for motorcycle and auto races. When Bill "Hardpan" Lane (or Bill "Hardrock" Lane) relocated his Hollywood Stars from the Los Angeles area in 1936, to become the San Diego Padres, he arranged for the Works Progress Administration to rebuild the venue as a baseball park. Although the WPA was known by the derisive nickname "We Putter Around", there was apparently no puttering around in this project, as they finished the work in just two months' time. It took the name Lane Field.

The new construction had a temporary look to it. The park had no roof, no lights, and not even a backstop. Its bleachers sat 8,000. The original entrance, a small Spanish-architecture structure, was retained for the ballpark, behind where the home plate area was established.

According to a 2004 San Diego Union-Tribune article, the original field dimensions were 339 feet to the left field foul pole, 480 to the deepest part of center field, and 355 feet to right, a large rectangle. Along with the other remodeling, the dimensions were eventually reduced to a more normal size: 329 to left, 426 to center, 330 to right.

The first Padres game at Lane Field was played on March 31, 1936. The next year, a roof was added over the main part of the seating, and attendance improved. Attendance was boosted by a PCL pennant winning team and the attraction of budding young local star Ted Williams.

On October 7, 1945, three African-American players from the California Winter League's "Kansas City Royals," one of them named Jackie Robinson, worked out at an empty Lane Field. Look magazine photographer Maurice Terrell surreptitiously photographed the action from the stands by agreement with Brooklyn Dodgers general manager Branch Rickey, who was planning to desegregate Major League Baseball and wanted illustrations for a planned exclusive feature article written by Arthur Mann. The article and photos would have highlighted Robinson and other stars from the Negro leagues, and was meant to accompany Rickey's announcement of signing them to the Dodgers. The article was never published in Look, but a selection of the Lane Field photographs was published in the November 27, 1945, issue of Look to illustrate the signing of Robinson to the Montreal Royals.

The San Diego Padres would win another PCL pennant in 1954 at Lane Field. By then they had begun to look for a new facility. The wooden park, so near the waterfront in a presumably picturesque setting, was also constantly in need of repair and replacement of its boards, which tended to rot quickly in the sea air.

== Abandonment ==
Lane Field was finally abandoned by the Padres following the 1957 PCL season. For 1958, the team shifted to the new Westgate Park, located in San Diego's Mission Valley area.

The site of Lane Field initially became Cruise Ship Parking, a parking lot between Pacific Highway and Harbor Drive which was used by cruise ship passengers. In 2015, it was dedicated as a city park. A plaque, which was placed in 2003 at the corner of Broadway and Pacific Highway to commemorate the ballpark, was moved in 2015 to the corner of Broadway and Harbor Drive.
