= William Lane (baseball) =

Baseball team owner

William "Hardpan" Lane
- Born: Harry William Lane; February 29, 1860
- Died: October 9, 1938 (aged 78)
- Occupation: Baseball team owner
- Awards: Pacific Coast League Hall of Fame

Harry William Lane (February 29, 1860 – October 9, 1938), known as Bill "Hardpan" Lane (or "Hardrock" Lane) was a baseball team owner in the Pacific Coast League during the early 1900s.

== Early life ==
Prior to getting into business as a baseball team owner, Lane was a miner in the Yukon Territory. This is where he received his nicknames of "Hardpan" and "Hardrock."

== Baseball team ownership ==
=== Salt Lake City Bees ===
In 1915, Lane purchased a small interest in the former Sacramento Solons (which had just moved to San Francisco the previous season and changed their name to the San Francisco Missions) franchise when the team was sold to a Salt Lake City ownership group and the team moved to Utah and changed their name to the Salt Lake City Bees. The league suspended operations in 1918 due to World War I and Lane was able to purchase controlling stake in the team at a cheap price.

The 1925 roster was the highest-scoring roster in PCL history, led by star player Tony Lazzeri who hit 60 home runs that season (more than Babe Ruth's then record 59 home runs in a season). Due to the team losing money, Lane and his manager Spider Baum sold Lazzeri to the New York Yankees for $50,000 (and Frank Zoeller and Mack Hillis) and he became part of the teams famous "Murderer's Row" line-up with Babe Ruth and Lou Gehrig (the Cubs had right of first refusal for Bees players, but they turned down Lazzeri due to his epilepsy). Lane then sold Lefty O'Doul to William Wrigley Jr., owner of the Chicago Cubs, for $50,000, but never played for the team. He also sold Bill Piercy to the Cubs for $25,000. In 1928, the Hollywood Stars became the first team to travel by plane, a necessity as they would not have time otherwise.

=== Hollywood Stars ===
In 1926, Lane moved to team to California and changed the name of the team to the Hollywood Stars (after being known as the Hollywood Bees). The team played at Wrigley Field (Los Angeles) in South Los Angeles. The Hollywood Stars won the PCL pennant in 1929 and 1930 under Lane's ownership.

=== San Diego Padres ===
Lane got into a dispute with Philip K. Wrigley (son of William Wrigley Jr. who died in 1932) over rental fees at the ballpark, and he moved the team to San Diego in 1936 and changed the name to the San Diego Padres (PCL) to play at Lane Field (baseball). In 1937, in their second year in San Diego, the Padres were led by sophomore player Ted Williams who Lane signed right out of high school, and the team won the Pacific Coast League pennant, even after losing future hall of famer Bobby Doerr. In December 1937, the team sold Williams to the Boston Red Sox in exchange for cash, outfielder Dom D'Allessandro and infielder Al Niemiec.

== Death and legacy ==
Lane died on October 09, 1938.

In 1950, Lane was inducted into the Pacific Coast League Hall of Fame.
