= C. Arnholt Smith =

American banker and embezzler (1899–1996)

Smith

Conrad Arnholt Smith (known as C. Arnholt Smith) (March 13, 1899 in Walla Walla, Washington – June 8, 1996 in Del Mar, California) was an American banker, businessman, civic booster, political fundraiser and felon with prominent ties to San Diego, California.

== Personal life ==
Smith was born in Walla Walla, Washington. His family fled to San Diego in 1907 when his father decided he liked the weather in San Diego. Smith grew up poor and never finished high school. He became a bank teller, and impressed A.P. Giannini, who moved him rapidly up the ranks of the Bank of Italy (what later became Bank of America). He married his first wife Lois Seaver Smith in 1922. He had one son, C. Arnholt Smith, Jr., and a daughter, Carol Smith Shannon. In the 1970s, he married Maria Helen Alvarez.

== Businessman ==
With financial help from his brother in the oil business, Smith bought the United States National Bank of San Diego in 1933 which grew from modest roots to the largest bank in San Diego and 10th largest in California. The bank came with interests in other businesses, notably National Iron Works, which became a prominent ship builder and is today a division of General Dynamics. In this way, Smith became not only a banker, but a businessman with diverse interests. He became the most prominent civic leader in San Diego.

He owned the largest bank in the city, had major interests in the tuna industry and real estate, and owned the San Diego Padres of the National League from their inception through 1974. Originally, he purchased the minor league Padres of the Pacific Coast League in 1955. He was awarded one of two National League expansion franchises slated to start in the 1969 season (along with the Montreal Expos). After failing in an attempt to move the Padres to Washington, D.C., he sold the team to McDonald's founder Ray Kroc.

Smith was a close friend of President Richard M. Nixon, and was with him on election night when Nixon won the presidency in 1968. Smith raised a reported $1 million for Nixon's 1968 presidential campaign, including $250,000 from him personally. Smith donated $200,000 to his re-election campaign in 1972, but the money was returned because Smith was under investigation by the SEC and IRS.

Smith's non-bank interests were collected as Westgate-California Corporation, in which his family kept a majority of voting interest. Westgate-California had interests in real estate, seafood canneries, silver mines, and transportation companies, including Air California. Smith was a major investor in San Diego's third largest industry, tuna. When Japan started offering cheaper tuna after 1950, Smith worked to break the union using new technology and Peruvian canneries.

== Prison ==
Smith's base was ownership of the United States National Bank in San Diego, of which he had purchased controlling interest in 1933. The bank grew to become the 86th largest bank in the country with $1.2 billion in total assets. The bank failed in October 1973, at which time it was the largest bank failure in history, due to an excessive level of bad loans to Smith-controlled companies, which exceeded the bank's legal lending limit. In August 1973, the Internal Revenue Service sued Smith for $23 million for back taxes. The IRS filed criminal charges in the case but they were later dropped. In 1975, Smith pleaded no contest to bank fraud charges and was placed on probation and fined $30,000. That same year, Smith was sued by the Federal Deposit Insurance Corporation for $45 million for engaging in "unsafe and unsound" banking practices. In 1977, a judge ordered Smith jailed for contempt because he refused to answer questions regarding his personal finances. In 1979, Smith was convicted of embezzlement of $8.9 million and tax fraud, involving his sale of the San Diego Padres. He served eight months in a county minimum-security Work Furlough Center in 1984 and 1985; his sentence was reduced due to his poor health. He died, penniless, in 1996 of congestive heart failure at age 97.
