= San Diego Padres (PCL) =

- 1936–1968; San Diego, California

Minor league affiliations
- Class: Triple-A (1946–1951, 1958–1968); Open (1952–1957); Double-A (1936–1945)
- League: Pacific Coast League (1936–1968)

Major league affiliations
- Team: Philadelphia Phillies (1966–1968); Cincinnati Reds (1962–1965); Chicago White Sox (1960–1961); Cleveland Indians (1949–1951, 1957–1959); Boston Red Sox (1936)

Minor league titles
- League titles (4): 1937; 1962; 1964; 1967
- Division titles (2): 1964; 1967

Team data
- Name: San Diego Padres (1936–1968)
- Ballpark: San Diego Stadium (1968); Westgate Park (1958–1967) Lane Field (1936–1957)

The San Diego Padres were a Minor League Baseball team based in San Diego, California, that competed in the Pacific Coast League (PCL) from 1936 through 1968. The team name was later given to the San Diego Padres of Major League Baseball (MLB).

== Franchise history ==
It began its existence in 1903 as the Sacramento Solons, a charter member of the PCL. The team moved to Tacoma in 1904 (where it won the PCL pennant), returned to Sacramento in 1905, then left the PCL altogether for the next three seasons. The Solons rejoined the PCL in 1909, then moved to San Francisco during the 1914 season, finishing out the season as the San Francisco Missions. The team was sold to businessman Bill "Hardpan" Lane, who moved the team to Salt Lake City for the 1915 season as the Salt Lake Bees.

Eleven years later Lane moved the Bees to Los Angeles for the 1926 season, and changed their name to the Hollywood Stars. The Stars played at Wrigley Field, home of the Los Angeles Angels, winning pennants in 1929 and 1930. When, after the 1935 season, the Angels doubled the Stars' rent, Lane moved the Stars to San Diego for the 1936 season, to become the San Diego Padres.

The city constructed a waterfront stadium for its new team, appropriately called Lane Field, replacing a race track that was on the site. The team finished second in its inaugural year in the border city, then won the postseason series and the PCL pennant in 1937, led by the hitting of sophomore outfielder Ted Williams, who was first signed to a contract in 1936. On October 2, 1944, Bill "Chick" Starr bought the Padres for $210,000 and was named the team president and general manager. In 1952, Starr announced that KFMB-TV founder Jack O. Gross purchased a large minority share, along with Dr. Robert M. Stone and real estate developer Irvin J. Kahn.

Though for the next decade or more the Padres were mired in the second division, at last this franchise achieved stability and longevity. The team remained in San Diego for 33 years, displaced only by virtue of San Diego's admission to the major leagues. In 1954, managed by former major league player Lefty O'Doul, the Padres finished first in the PCL for the first time in their history, but were eliminated in the postseason playoffs.

After the 1957 season, the Padres were sold to C. Arnholt Smith, who moved the team from ancient Lane Field to Westgate Park, an 8,200-seat facility located in what is now the Fashion Valley Mall of Mission Valley. In 1960, Smith brought in Eddie Leishman as general manager and club president. Leishman, who had helped to run the Yankee farm system throughout the previous 10 years, was brought in with the goal of bringing the team to the Major Leagues. The Padres proceeded to win PCL pennants in 1962, 1964, and 1967. The Padres were the Triple-A affiliate of the Cincinnati Reds from 1962–65; some of their players (including Tony Pérez) would become vital cogs of what was called the "Big Red Machine" Reds' teams of the 1970s. The Pads won a final PCL pennant in 1967 as a farm club of the Philadelphia Phillies.

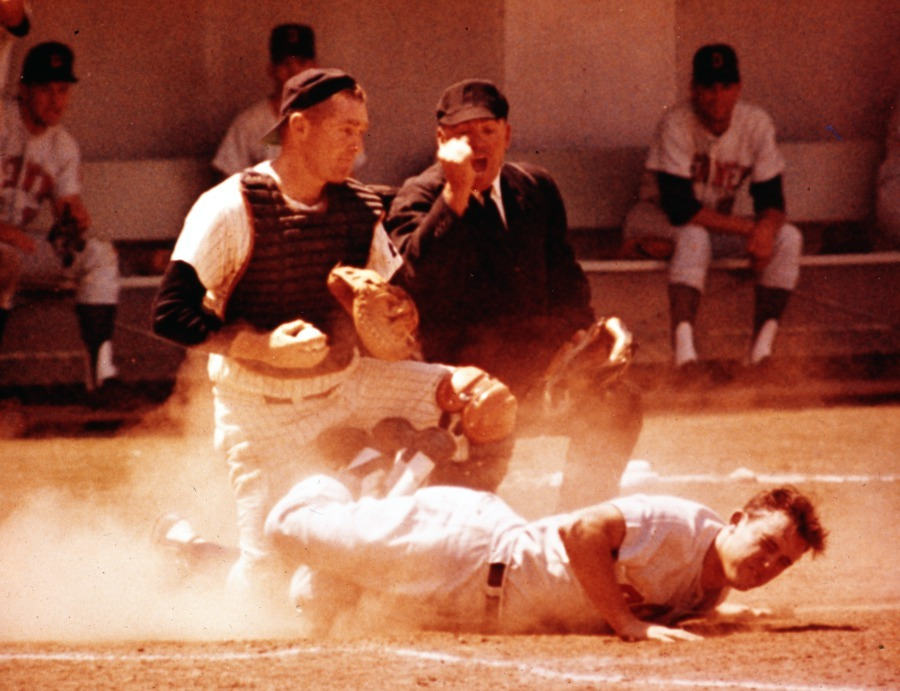
An umpire signals an opposing baserunner is out at home plate during a 1960s Padres game.

In 1967, Smith won a bid for an expansion team in the National League for the 1969 season. After the 1968 PCL season, he surrendered the franchise, which moved to Eugene, Oregon, and transferred the Padre name to his new NL team, the San Diego Padres. Leishman was named general manager of the MLB Padres, with club president and minority investor Buzzie Bavasi, formerly GM of the Los Angeles Dodgers, playing a dominant role in its baseball operations.

== Affiliations ==
The Padres, like most PCL clubs, operated without a working agreement with or outright ownership by a major league team throughout much of the 1930s and 1940s, and again in the mid-1950s when the PCL was an Open Classification league attempting to attain MLB status. They were affiliated with the following major league teams:

Year(s)	Affiliation
1936	Boston Red Sox
1949–51; 1957–59	Cleveland Indians
1960–61	Chicago White Sox
1962–65	Cincinnati Reds
1966–68	Philadelphia Phillies

== Notable players ==
- Joe Horlen, pitcher
- Art Shamsky, outfielder
- Ted Williams, outfielder
- Bobby Doerr, second base
- Minnie Minoso, outfielder
- Tony Perez, first base
- Jack Merson, second base
- Tommy Helms, shortstop, second base
- Lee May, first base, outfielder
- Johnny Ritchey, catcher
- Chuck Eisenmann, pitcher

Preceded by Kansas City Blues (1934)	Boston Red Sox; Double-A affiliate 1936 (with Syracuse Chiefs)	Succeeded by Minneapolis Millers (1938)
