= 29th Wisconsin Legislature =

Wisconsin legislative term for 1876

←	28th	30th	→
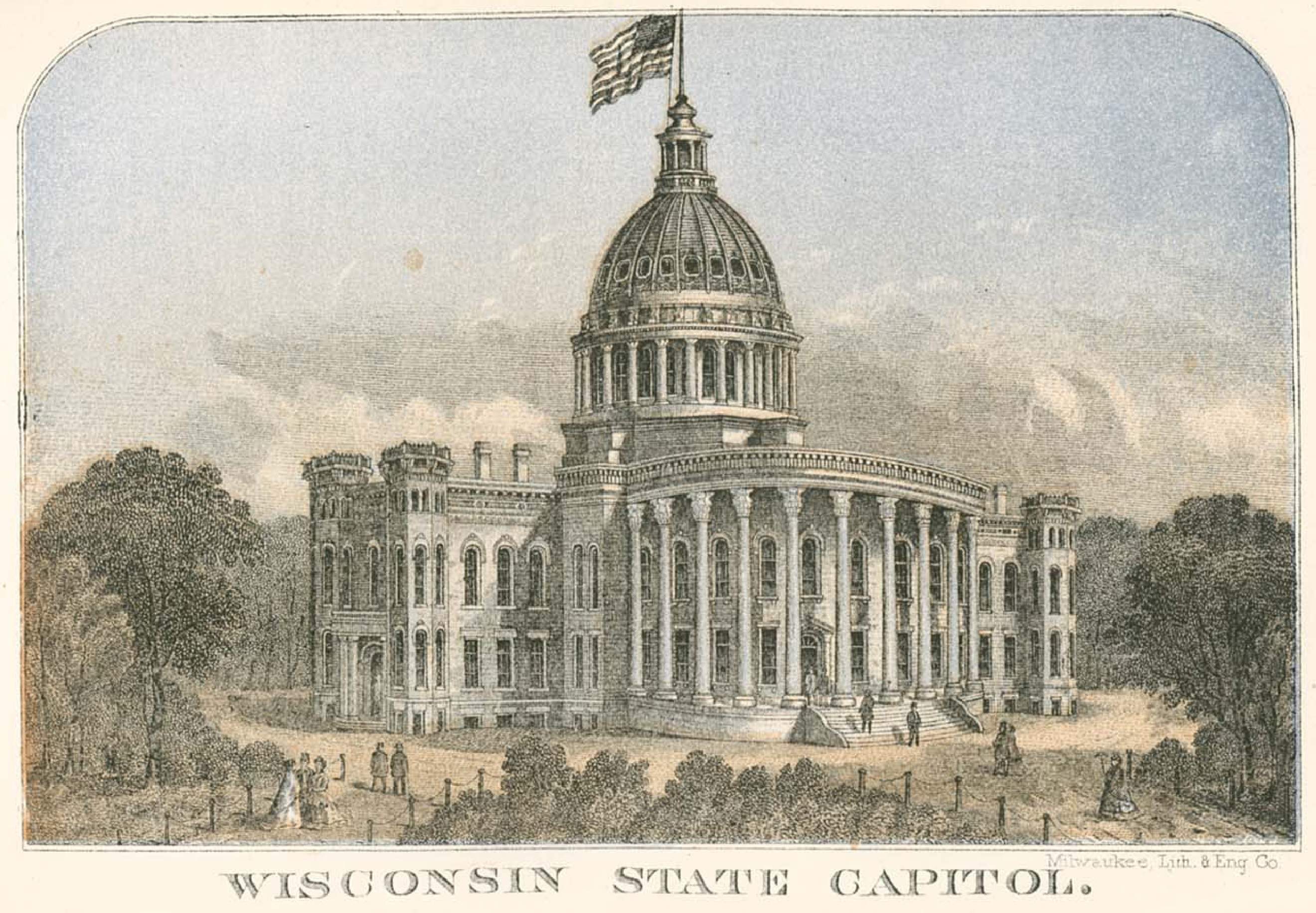
- Wisconsin State Capitol, 1863

Overview
- Legislative body: Wisconsin Legislature
- Meeting place: Wisconsin State Capitol
- Term: January 3, 1876 – January 1, 1877
- Election: November 2, 1875

Senate
- Members: 33
- Senate President: Charles D. Parker (D)
- President pro tempore: Robert L. D. Potter (R)
- Party control: Republican

Assembly
- Members: 100
- Assembly Speaker: Sam S. Fifield (R)
- Party control: Republican

Sessions
- 1st: January 12, 1876 – March 14, 1876

The Twenty-Ninth Wisconsin Legislature convened from January 12, 1876, to March 14, 1876, in regular session.

Senators representing even-numbered districts were newly elected for this session and were serving the first year of a two-year term. Assembly members were elected to a one-year term. Assembly members and even-numbered senators were elected in the general election of November 2, 1875. Senators representing odd-numbered districts were serving the second year of their two-year term, having been elected in the general election held on November 3, 1874.

The governor of Wisconsin during this entire term was Republican Harrison Ludington, of Milwaukee County, serving the first year of a two-year term, having won election in the 1875 Wisconsin gubernatorial election.

== Major events ==
- January 3, 1876: Inauguration of Harrison Ludington as the 13th Governor of Wisconsin.
- February 2, 1876: The National League of Professional Base Ball Clubs was founded at a meeting in Chicago.
- March 7, 1876: Alexander Graham Bell was granted a United States patent for the telephone.
- March 27, 1876: The United States Supreme Court decided the case United States v. Reese, narrowing the scope of the Fifteenth Amendment to the United States Constitution, and enabling the creation of new laws to limit the voting rights of African Americans. On the same day, the court also decided the case United States v. Cruikshank, significantly limiting the power of the federal government to enforce civil rights protections.
- June 25 – June 26, 1876: 300 men of the 7th U.S. Cavalry Regiment were killed by a force of Lakota, Cheyenne, and Arapaho at the Battle of the Little Bighorn.
- July 4, 1876: United States Centennial.
- November 7, 1876: The 1876 United States presidential election was held. Rutherford B. Hayes was the apparent winner of the electoral college votes, but the results were bitterly disputed due to various fraud schemes in southern states, and the fact that Samuel J. Tilden was the apparent winner of the popular vote.

== Major legislation ==
- March 13, 1876: An Act to apportion the state into senate and assembly districts, 1876 Act 343.

== Party summary ==
=== Senate summary ===
Senate partisan composition Democratic: 6 seats Reform: 4 seats Liberal Republican: 2 seats Republican: 21 seats

	Party (Shading indicates majority caucus)				Total	
	Dem.	Ref.	Lib.R.	Rep.	Total	Vacant
End of previous Legislature	9	5	2	17	33	0
1st Session	6	4	2	21	33	0
Final voting share	36.36%			63.64%		
Beginning of the next Legislature	8	0	3	22	33	0

=== Assembly summary ===
Assembly partisan composition Democratic: 35 seats Reform: 11 seats Independent: 1 seat Liberal Republican: 1 seat Republican: 52 seats

	Party (Shading indicates majority caucus)					Total	
	Dem.	Ref.	Ind.	Lib.R.	Rep.	Total	Vacant
End of previous Legislature	19	13	0	4	64	100	0
Start of 1st Session	35	12	1	1	51	100	0
From Feb. 17	35	11	1	1	52	100	0
Final voting share	48%				52%		
Beginning of the next Legislature	33	5	0	1	61	100	0

== Sessions ==
- 1st Regular session: January 12, 1876 – March 14, 1876

== Leaders ==
=== Senate leadership ===
- President of the Senate: Charles D. Parker (D)
- President pro tempore: Robert L. D. Potter (R)

=== Assembly leadership ===
- Speaker of the Assembly: Sam S. Fifield (R)

== Members ==
=== Members of the Senate ===
Members of the Senate for the Twenty-Ninth Wisconsin Legislature:

Senate partisan representation Democratic: 6 seats Reform: 4 seats Lib. Rep.: 2 seats Republican: 21 seats

Dist.	Counties	Senator	Residence	Party
01	Sheboygan	Enos Eastman	Plymouth	Dem.
02	Brown, Door, & Kewaunee	Thomas R. Hudd	Green Bay	Ref.
03	Milwaukee (Northern Part)	William H. Jacobs	Milwaukee	Ref.
04	Monroe & Vernon	J. Henry Tate	Viroqua	Rep.
05	Racine	Robert Hall Baker	Racine	Rep.
06	Milwaukee (Southern Half)	John L. Mitchell	Milwaukee	Dem.
07	Dane (Eastern Part)	George E. Bryant	Madison	Rep.
08	Kenosha & Walworth	Asahel Farr	Kenosha	Rep.
09	Iowa	David McFarland	Highland	Ref.
10	Waukesha	William Blair	Waukesha	Rep.
11	Lafayette	Francis Campbell	Gratiot	Rep.
12	Green	Joseph B. Treat	Monroe	Rep.
13	Dodge	John A. Barney	Mayville	Dem.
14	Sauk	David E. Welch	Baraboo	Rep.
15	Manitowoc	John Schuette	Manitowoc	Rep.
16	Grant	Oscar C. Hathaway	Beetown	Rep.
17	Rock	Horatio N. Davis	Beloit	Rep.
18	Fond du Lac (Western Part)	William Hiner	Fond du Lac	Rep.
19	Winnebago	William P. Rounds	Menasha	Rep.
20	Fond du Lac (Eastern Part)	Daniel Cavanagh	Osceola	Dem.
21	Marathon, Oconto, Shawano, Waupaca, & Northern Outagamie	Willis C. Silverthorn	Wausau	Lib.D.
22	Calumet & Southern Outagamie	James Ryan	Appleton	Dem.
23	Jefferson	William W. Reed	Jefferson	Lib.R.
24	Ashland, Barron, Bayfield, Burnett, Douglas, Pierce, Polk, & St. Croix	Henry D. Barron	St. Croix Falls	Rep.
25	Green Lake, Marquette, & Waushara	Robert L. D. Potter	Wautoma	Rep.
26	Dane (Western Part)	Romanzo E. Davis	Middleton	Lib.R.
27	Columbia	Levi W. Barden	Portage	Rep.
28	Crawford & Richland	Daniel Downs	Richland Center	Rep.
29	Adams, Juneau, Portage, & Wood	Thomas B. Scott	Grand Rapids	Rep.
30	Chippewa, Dunn, Eau Claire, Pepin, & Taylor	Rockwell J. Flint	Eau Claire	Rep.
31	La Crosse	Sylvester Nevins	La Crosse	Rep.
32	Buffalo, Clark, Jackson, & Trempealeau	Mark Douglas	Melrose	Rep.
33	Ozaukee & Washington	Gilead J. Wilmot	West Bend	Dem.

=== Members of the Assembly ===
Members of the Assembly for the Twenty-Ninth Wisconsin Legislature:

Assembly partisan composition Democratic: 35 seats Reform: 11 seats Independent: 1 seat Liberal Republican: 1 seat Republican: 52 seats

Senate District	County	Dist.	Representative	Party	Residence
29	Adams & Wood		G. M. Marshall	Rep.	Big Spring
24	Ashland, Barron, Bayfield, Burnett, Douglas, Polk		Sam Fifield	Rep.	Ashland
02	Brown & Southern Kewaunee	1	Mitchell Resch	Dem.	Green Bay
02	Brown & Southern Kewaunee	2	William J. Fisk	Rep.	Fort Howard
02	Brown & Southern Kewaunee	3	Dennis Dewane	Dem.	New Denmark
32	Buffalo		Edward Lees	Dem.	Fountain City
22	Calumet		Henry Horst	Dem.	Hayton
30	Chippewa & Taylor		Cadwallader J. Wiltse	Dem.	Chippewa Falls
32	Clark & Jackson		Hugh Mills	Rep.	Millston
27	Columbia	1	Michael Griffin	Rep.	Kilbourn City
27	Columbia	2	John G. Griffin	Rep.	Randolph
27	Columbia	3	Augustus O. Dole	Rep.	Poynette
28	Crawford		Fergus Mills	Dem.	Seneca
07	Dane	1	William Seamonson	Rep.	Stoughton
07	Dane	2	William Charlton	Lib.R.	Madison
26	Dane	3	Peter Zander	Dem.	Cross Plains
26	Dane	4	Michael Johnson	Ref.	Springdale
13	Dodge	1	Patrick Griffin	Dem.	Portland
13	Dodge	2	Columbus Germain	Dem.	Beaver Dam
13	Dodge	3	George H. Lawrence	Rep.	Burnett
13	Dodge	4	Charles E. Kite	Dem.	Mayville
13	Dodge	5	George Schott	Dem.	Herman
13	Dodge	6	James Higgins	Ref.	Shields
02	Door & Northern Kewaunee		Leroy M. Washburn	Ref.	Sturgeon Bay
30	Dunn & Pepin		Menzus R. Bump	Rep.	Rock Falls
30	Eau Claire		Hobart Stocking	Rep.	Eau Claire
18	Fond du Lac	1	James K. Scribner	Rep.	Eldorado Mills
18	Fond du Lac	2	Edson A. Putnam	Rep.	Oakfield
20	Fond du Lac	3	Lambert Brost	Dem.	Calumet
16	Grant	1	William D. Jones	Rep.	Hazel Green
16	Grant	2	Joseph Bock	Rep.	Lancaster
16	Grant	3	George Brown	Rep.	Woodman
16	Grant	4	William J. McCoy	Dem.	Beetown
12	Green		John Luchsinger	Rep.	New Glarus
25	Green Lake		Waldo Flint	Rep.	Princeton
09	Iowa	1	Ansley Gray (until Feb. 17)	Ref.	Avoca
09	Iowa	1	Joseph Bennett (from Feb. 17)	Rep.	Dodgeville
09	Iowa	2	Kearton Coates	Rep.	Linden
23	Jefferson	1	Thomas Shinnick	Dem.	Watertown
23	Jefferson	2	Charles H. Phillips	Rep.	Lake Mills
23	Jefferson	3	David W. Curtis	Rep.	Fort Atkinson
29	Juneau		Charles E. Booth	Rep.	Elroy
08	Kenosha		Frederick Robinson	Dem.	Kenosha
31	La Crosse		John Bradley	Rep.	Bangor
11	Lafayette		Danverse Neff	Rep.	Calamine
15	Manitowoc	1	Charles R. Zorn	Dem.	Keil
15	Manitowoc	2	Thomas Mohr	Ref.	Kossuth
15	Manitowoc	3	William F. Tisch	Dem.	Mishicott
21	Marathon		Bartholomew Ringle	Dem.	Wausau
25	Marquette		B. Frank Goodell	Dem.	Montello
03	Milwaukee	1	Patrick Drew	Dem.	Milwaukee
03	Milwaukee	2	Peter Fagg	Ind.D.	Milwaukee
06	Milwaukee	3	Edward Keogh	Dem.	Milwaukee
06	Milwaukee	4	Bernard F. Cooke	Dem.	Milwaukee
06	Milwaukee	5	David Vance	Rep.	Milwaukee
03	Milwaukee	6	Charles Kraatz	Dem.	Milwaukee
06	Milwaukee	7	Lemuel Ellsworth	Rep.	Milwaukee
06	Milwaukee	8	Henry Fink	Ind.	Milwaukee
03	Milwaukee	9	George H. Walther	Ref.	Milwaukee
03	Milwaukee	10	F. A. Zautcke	Rep.	Granville
06	Milwaukee	11	Hubert Lavies	Ref.	Greenfield
04	Monroe	1	Albert T. Colburn	Rep.	Little Falls
04	Monroe	2	Charles D. Wells	Dem.	Tomah
21	Oconto		Louis P. Pahl	Ref.	Oconto
22	Outagamie, Shawano, & Waupaca	1	David Hammel	Dem.	Appleton
21	Outagamie, Shawano, & Waupaca	2	John J. Knowlton	Ind.D.	Seymour
21	Outagamie, Shawano, & Waupaca	3	Henry Mumbrue	Ind.R.	Waupaca
33	Ozaukee	1	Gustav Gotze	Ref.	Port Washington
33	Ozaukee	2	William Carbys	Ind.R.	Mequon
24	Pierce		Christopher L. Taylor	Dem.	Maiden Rock
29	Portage		Thomas W. Anderson	Rep.	Stevens Point
05	Racine	1	Norton J. Field	Rep.	Racine
05	Racine	2	Elias White	Ref.	Burlington
28	Richland	1	J. L. R. McCollum	Dem.	Sextonville
28	Richland	2	Henry H. Hoyt	Rep.	West Branch
17	Rock	1	Lloyd T. Pullen	Rep.	Evansville
17	Rock	2	George Gleason	Rep.	Lima
17	Rock	3	Andrew Barlass	Rep.	Harmony
17	Rock	4	Sereno Merrill	Rep.	Beloit
17	Rock	5	Jere A. Blount	Dem.	Janesville
14	Sauk	1	David B. Hulburt	Rep.	Loganville
14	Sauk	2	Silas J. Seymour	Rep.	Dellona
01	Sheboygan	1	Joseph Wedig	Ref.	Sheboygan
01	Sheboygan	2	William Noll	Rep.	Cascade
01	Sheboygan	3	Louis Wolf	Dem.	Sheboygan Falls
24	St. Croix		Philo Boyden	Ref.	Hudson
32	Trempealeau		Noah D. Comstock	Rep.	Arcadia
04	Vernon	1	John Stevenson	Rep.	Harmony
04	Vernon	2	Timothy S. Jordan	Rep.	Union
08	Walworth	1	Charles S. Teeple	Rep.	Darien
08	Walworth	2	Benoni Reynolds	Rep.	Geneva
08	Walworth	3	D. Manfield Stearns	Rep.	Sugar Creek
33	Washington	1	Andrew Martin	Dem.	Jackson
33	Washington	2	Philip Schneider	Dem.	Farmington
10	Waukesha	1	William H. Hardy	Dem.	Genesee
10	Waukesha	2	James S. Dent	Rep.	Menomonee Falls
25	Waushara		Jabez K. Walker	Rep.	East Oasis
19	Winnebago	1	Thomas Wall	Dem.	Oshkosh
19	Winnebago	2	Eric McArthur	Rep.	Winneconne
19	Winnebago	3	Leroy S. Chase	Rep.	Omro
19	Winnebago	4	Sidney Shufelt	Rep.	Poygan

== Employees ==
=== Senate employees ===
- Chief Clerk: Andrew Jackson Turner
  - Assistant Clerk: J. F. A. Williams
  - Bookkeeper: J. T. Huntington
  - Engrossing Clerk: Ms. Georgie Clise
  - Enrolling Clerk: J. T. Jacobson
  - Transcribing Clerk: Ed. Borcherdt
- Sergeant-at-Arms: R. T. Gardner
  - Assistant Sergeant-at-Arms: George Hawley
- Postmaster: D. McBride
  - Assistant Postmaster: C. A. Carter
- Gallery Attendant: R. B. Winsor
  - Assistant Attendant: A. T. Conger
  - Committee Room Attendants:
    - H. A. Head
    - Alfred Newgent
    - C. H. Newton
- Doorkeepers:
  - M. Lynch
  - T. Torkelson
  - S. F. Leavitt
  - Hohn Hallahan
- Porter: T. H. Hanson
- Janitor: P. Gilluly
- Messengers:
  - Arthur A. Hills
  - Sherman G. Potter
  - Daniel Trainer
  - Herbert Rinder
  - Eugene Abbott
  - Fred Richards
  - George Gewicke
  - Lucien Pickarts
  - Willie Scampton

=== Assembly employees ===
- Chief Clerk: Rollin M. Strong
  - Assistant Clerk: Chester Deming Long
  - Bookkeeper: William M. Fogo
  - Engrossing Clerk: Mrs. Fannie Vilas
  - Enrolling Clerk: R. A. Gillett
  - Transcribing Clerk: J. P. Cooper
  - Clerk for the Committee on Judiciary: Frank O. Wisner
- Sergeant-at-Arms: Elisha Starr
  - Assistant Sergeant-at-Arms: George H. Osgood
- Postmaster: John H. Manschot
  - Assistant Postmaster: Fred M. Griswold
- Doorkeepers:
  - Henry Matthews
  - William F. Shallock
  - T. E. Abbott
  - E. S. Chase
- Committee Room Attendants:
  - John Hannon
  - W. H. Bell
  - W. R. Kent
  - Richard Prichard
- Gallery Attendants:
  - W. Alten
  - Frank Burgess
- Porter: W. F. Bingman
- Night Watch: C. F. Ainsworth
- Fireman: Thomas Nelson
- Speaker's Messenger: Charles Weight
- Chief Clerk's Messenger: Theo. Thorson
- Sergeant-at-Arms' Messenger: M. L. Parker
- Messengers:
  - Willie Betts
  - Walter Holt
  - Joseph Ready
  - Mark Baker
  - Harry Meeker
  - B. B. Jones
  - Lyman Curtis
  - James DeBauker
  - Willie Plumb
  - Julius Voltz
  - Lucius Cannon
  - Freddie D. Fagg
  - Henry Delaney
