= Killilea =

Killilea is a surname originating in Ireland. Notable people with the surname include:

- Henry Killilea (1863–1929), American baseball team owner and attorney
- Karen Killilea (1940-2020), Marie Killilea's daughter with cerebral palsy
- Marie Killilea (1913–91), American author and cerebral palsy activist
- Mark Killilea Snr (1896–1970), Irish politician
- Mark Killilea Jnr (1939-2018), Irish politician
- Matthew Killilea (1862–1902), American lawyer and politician
