= James Dent =

James Dent may refer to:

- James S. Dent, American politician
- Jim Dent (born 1939), American golfer
- Jim Dent (author) (born 1953), American author and sportswriter
- Jimmy Dent, a character in Across the Continent
- James C. Dent House, a historic home in Washington, D.C.
