= Peter Zander =

Peter Zander may refer to:

- Peter Zander (actor) (1922–2019), German-born British actor
- Peter Zander (politician) (1832–1884), American politician
