= McRoy =

McRoy is a surname. Notable people with the surname include:

- Bob McRoy (died 1917), American baseball executive
- Elwyn McRoy, American college basketball coach
- Jason McRoy (1971–1995), English mountain bike racer
- Spike McRoy (born 1968), American golfer

== See also ==
- McCoy (surname)
