= Nathaniel Robinson =

Nathaniel Robinson may refer to:

- Nate Robinson (born 1984), American basketball player
- Nate Robinson (American football) (born 1985), American football player
- Nathaniel S. Robinson, Wisconsin legislator from Winnebago County, Wisconsin
