= Broken Star =

Broken Star may refer to:

- Broken Star (album), 1998 album by American punk band The Broadways
- Broken Star (film), 2018 American psychological thriller film
- The Broken Star, 1956 American Western film
