= Paul Haugh =

American farmer and legislator

Paul Haugh (May 12, 1896 – April 11, 1966) was an American farmer and legislator.

Born in the Town of Union, Vernon County, Wisconsin, Haugh served in the United States Army during World War I. He was a farmer, director and secretary of a fire mutual insurance company. Haugh served on the town and Vernon County boards. He served in the Wisconsin State Assembly in 1959 as a Democrat. Haugh died in Madison, Wisconsin.
