= Dover-Foxcroft, Maine =

- Town
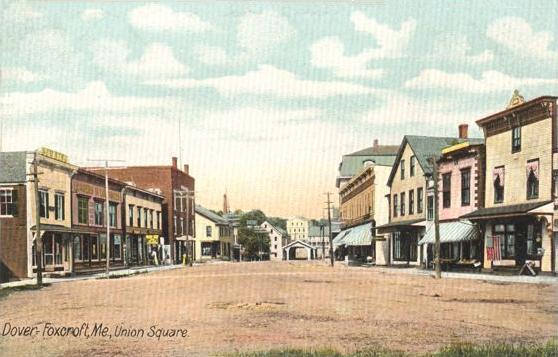
- Union Square c. 1906

- Seal
- Nickname: The Heart of Maine
- Location in Piscataquis County and the state of Maine

- Location within Maine Location within the United States
- Coordinates: 45°11′10″N 69°13′13″W
- Country: United States
- State: Maine
- County: Piscataquis
- Incorporated: 1812 (Foxcroft); 1822 (Dover)
- Merger: March 11, 1922

Area
  - Total: 71.18 sq mi (184.36 km^{2})
  - Land: 67.81 sq mi (175.63 km^{2})
  - Water: 3.37 sq mi (8.73 km^{2})
- Elevation: 371 ft (113 m)

Population (2020)
  - Total: 4,422
  - Density: 65/sq mi (25.2/km^{2})
- Time zone: UTC−05:00 (EST)
  - Summer (DST): UTC−04:00 (EDT)
- ZIP Code: 04426
- Area code: 207
- FIPS code: 23-18195
- GNIS feature ID: 0582445
- Website: www.dover-foxcroft.org

Dover-Foxcroft is the largest town in and the seat of Piscataquis County, Maine, United States. The population was 4,422 at the 2020 census. The town is located near the geographic center of the state. It contains a census-designated place of the same name.

== History ==
Dover-Foxcroft was originally two towns, Dover and Foxcroft, separated by the Piscataquis River. Dover was to the south of the river, and Foxcroft was to the north.

Dover was purchased from Massachusetts by Boston merchants Charles Vaughan and John Merrick, both of whom had emigrated from England. It was first permanently settled in 1803 by Eli Towne from Temple, New Hampshire, then incorporated on January 19, 1822. Agriculture was the principal early occupation, producing potatoes, corn and grain.

Originally known as T5 R7 NWP, Foxcroft was one of five towns conveyed by Massachusetts in 1796 to Bowdoin College. It was purchased from the college in 1800 by Joseph E. Foxcroft of New Gloucester and settled by John, Eleazer and Seth Spaulding in 1806, when they built the first mill. It was dubbed Spauldingtown until February 29, 1812, when it was incorporated as Foxcroft, taking its proprietor's name.

The Piscataquis River offered water power sites for mills. In 1859 the population of Dover was 2,500 and industries included four sawmills, shingle and clapboard manufacturers, one gristmill, two tanneries, two carriage makers, and a woolen factory.

By 1859, the population of Foxcroft was 1,045. Industries included two sawmills; one shingle mill; one carding machine; one carriage builder; one chair manufacturer; one tannery; one fork maker; two pail makers; one machinist; and a sash, door and blind factory. In 1866 the Hughes & Son Piano Mfg. Co. was established and ran until it closed in 1921.

On March 1, 1922, the two towns merged into a single town.

Dover-Foxcroft has a notable United States post office mural painted during the New Deal era.

The American Woolen Company Foxcroft Mill is a historic district of industrial buildings added to the National Register of Historic Places in December 2012. It contains buildings built between 1841 and 1944.

Dover-Foxcroft is home to the Maine Whoopie Pie Festival, an annual one-day event which takes place in late June. It started in 2009 to honor the whoopie pie. The whoopie pie became the official state treat of Maine in 2013. The 2012 festival brought 5,000 people to the town, while the 2014 event brought in more than 7,500 attendees.

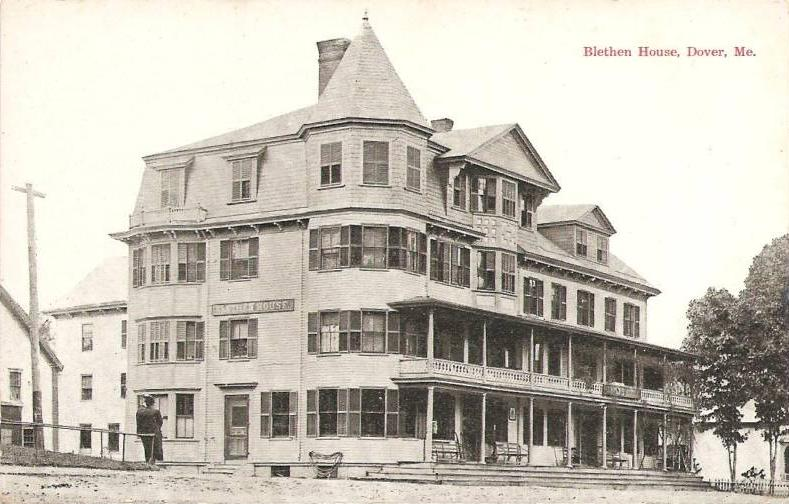
Blethen House c. 1910

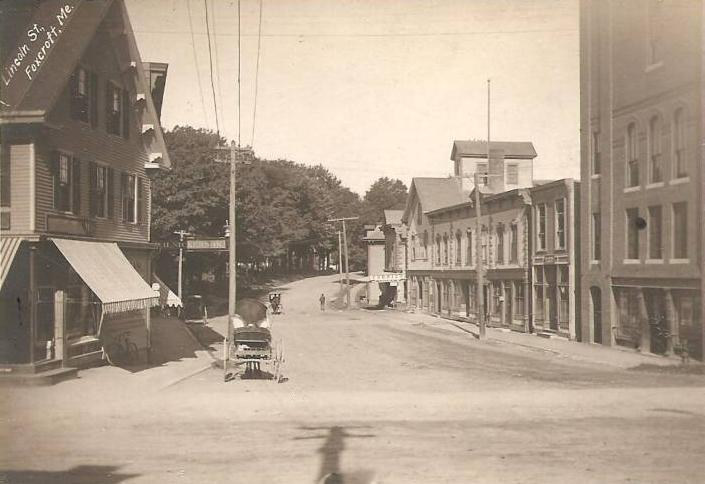
Lincoln Street c. 1905

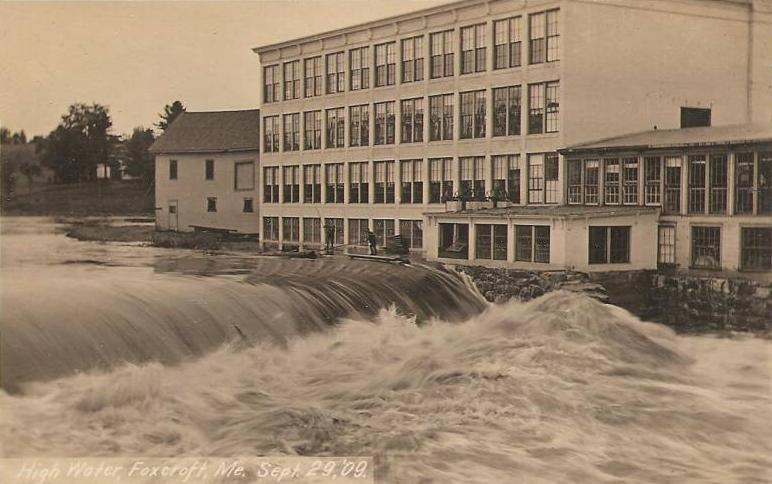
High water in 1909

== Geography ==
According to the United States Census Bureau, the town has a total area of 71.18 square miles (184.36 km^{2}), of which 67.81 square miles (175.63 km^{2}) is land and 3.37 square miles (8.73 km^{2}) is water. Dover-Foxcroft is drained by the Piscataquis River.

The town is crossed by state routes 6, 7, 15, 16 and 153. It is the commercial center of the county.

=== Climate ===
This climatic region is typified by large seasonal temperature differences, with warm to hot (and often humid) summers and cold (sometimes severely cold) winters. According to the Köppen Climate Classification system, Dover-Foxcroft has a humid continental climate, abbreviated "Dfb" on climate maps.

Climate data for Dover-Foxcroft WWTP, Maine (1991–2020 normals, extremes 1969–present)
Month	Jan	Feb	Mar	Apr	May	Jun	Jul	Aug	Sep	Oct	Nov	Dec	Year
Record high °F (°C)	57 (14)	59 (15)	81 (27)	89 (32)	93 (34)	96 (36)	98 (37)	97 (36)	94 (34)	86 (30)	75 (24)	63 (17)	98 (37)
Mean maximum °F (°C)	45.8 (7.7)	46.6 (8.1)	54.8 (12.7)	71.6 (22.0)	83.0 (28.3)	88.2 (31.2)	89.1 (31.7)	87.9 (31.1)	84.0 (28.9)	72.9 (22.7)	62.0 (16.7)	50.0 (10.0)	92.0 (33.3)
Mean daily maximum °F (°C)	26.0 (−3.3)	29.4 (−1.4)	38.3 (3.5)	51.1 (10.6)	65.3 (18.5)	74.2 (23.4)	79.8 (26.6)	78.5 (25.8)	70.8 (21.6)	57.1 (13.9)	44.1 (6.7)	32.4 (0.2)	53.9 (12.2)
Daily mean °F (°C)	14.7 (−9.6)	16.9 (−8.4)	26.8 (−2.9)	39.5 (4.2)	52.4 (11.3)	61.9 (16.6)	67.4 (19.7)	65.9 (18.8)	57.8 (14.3)	45.7 (7.6)	34.4 (1.3)	22.8 (−5.1)	42.2 (5.7)
Mean daily minimum °F (°C)	3.4 (−15.9)	4.5 (−15.3)	15.2 (−9.3)	27.9 (−2.3)	39.6 (4.2)	49.5 (9.7)	55.1 (12.8)	53.3 (11.8)	44.7 (7.1)	34.4 (1.3)	24.8 (−4.0)	13.2 (−10.4)	30.5 (−0.8)
Mean minimum °F (°C)	−17.3 (−27.4)	−15.3 (−26.3)	−7.0 (−21.7)	16.1 (−8.8)	27.3 (−2.6)	37.9 (3.3)	45.4 (7.4)	42.4 (5.8)	31.0 (−0.6)	21.7 (−5.7)	9.2 (−12.7)	−6.3 (−21.3)	−19.7 (−28.7)
Record low °F (°C)	−31 (−35)	−29 (−34)	−21 (−29)	4 (−16)	22 (−6)	25 (−4)	38 (3)	32 (0)	23 (−5)	14 (−10)	−3 (−19)	−28 (−33)	−31 (−35)
Average precipitation inches (mm)	3.47 (88)	2.76 (70)	3.39 (86)	3.65 (93)	3.34 (85)	4.35 (110)	3.36 (85)	3.67 (93)	3.70 (94)	4.82 (122)	4.09 (104)	4.07 (103)	44.67 (1,135)
Average snowfall inches (cm)	18.1 (46)	19.8 (50)	15.1 (38)	4.7 (12)	0.1 (0.25)	0.0 (0.0)	0.0 (0.0)	0.0 (0.0)	0.0 (0.0)	0.5 (1.3)	3.9 (9.9)	15.1 (38)	77.3 (196)
Average extreme snow depth inches (cm)	20.2 (51)	27.1 (69)	28.0 (71)	15.4 (39)	0.1 (0.25)	0.0 (0.0)	0.0 (0.0)	0.0 (0.0)	0.0 (0.0)	0.4 (1.0)	3.2 (8.1)	12.2 (31)	32.0 (81)
Average precipitation days (≥ 0.01 in)	10.5	9.3	9.8	11.1	13.0	13.4	13.2	12.0	9.9	12.0	10.9	12.7	137.8
Average snowy days (≥ 0.1 in)	7.3	7.1	5.2	1.8	0.1	0.0	0.0	0.0	0.0	0.4	2.4	6.9	31.2
Source: NOAA

== Demographics ==
Historical population
Census	Pop.	Note	%±
1830	1,042		—
1840	1,597		53.3%
1850	1,927		20.7%
1860	1,970		2.2%
1870	1,983		0.7%
1880	1,687		−14.9%
1890	1,942		15.1%
1900	1,889		−2.7%
1910	2,091		10.7%
1920	1,979		−5.4%
1930	3,750		89.5%
1940	4,015		7.1%
1950	4,218		5.1%
1960	4,173		−1.1%
1970	4,178		0.1%
1980	4,323		3.5%
1990	4,657		7.7%
2000	4,211		−9.6%
2010	4,213		0.0%
2020	4,422		5.0%
U.S. Decennial Census

=== 2010 census ===
As of the census of 2010, there were 4,213 people, 1,773 households, and 1,120 families residing in the town. The population density was 62.1 inhabitants per square mile (24.0/km^{2}). There were 2,459 housing units at an average density of 36.3 per square mile (14.0/km^{2}). The racial makeup of the town was 95.1% White, 0.2% African American, 0.6% Native American, 2.3% Asian, 0.3% from other races, and 1.5% from two or more races. Hispanic or Latino people of any race were 1.4% of the population.

There were 1,773 households, of which 26.5% had children under the age of 18 living with them, 48.8% were married couples living together, 10.0% had a female householder with no husband present, 4.3% had a male householder with no wife present, and 36.8% were non-families. 30.6% of all households were made up of individuals, and 14.5% had someone living alone who was 65 years of age or older. The average household size was 2.27 and the average family size was 2.79.

The median age in the town was 45 years. 21.5% of residents were under the age of 18; 6.4% were between the ages of 18 and 24; 22.1% were from 25 to 44; 29.8% were from 45 to 64; and 20.2% were 65 years of age or older. The gender makeup of the town was 48.1% male and 51.9% female.

=== 2000 census ===
As of the census of 2000, there were 4,211 people, 1,658 households, and 1,152 families residing in the town. The population density was 61.7 inhabitants per square mile (23.8/km^{2}). There were 2,200 housing units at an average density of 32.2 per square mile (12.4/km^{2}). The racial makeup of the town was 96.91% Caucasian, 0.21% Black or African American, 0.52% Native American, 0.52% Asian, 0.02% Pacific Islander, 0.19% from other races and 1.61% from two or more races. Hispanic or Latino people of any race were 0.95% of the population.

There were 1,658 households, out of which 32.4% had children under the age of 18 living with them, 54.6% were married couples living together, 10.3% had a female householder with no husband present, and 30.5% were non-families. 25.4% of all households were made up of individuals, and 11.8% had someone living alone who was 65 years of age or older. The average household size was 2.45 and the average family size was 2.91.

In the town, the population was spread out, with 36.9% under the age of 18, 5.8% from 18 to 24, 25.7% from 25 to 44, 25.7% from 45 to 64, and 17.8% who were 65 years of age or older. The median age was 41 years. For every 100 females, there were 93.2 males. For every 100 females age 18 and over, there were 90.6 males.

The median income for a household in the town was $30,164, and the median income for a family was $36,287. Males had a median income of $30,000 versus $20,613 for females. The per capita income for the town was $14,544. About 13.6% of families and 15.8% of the population were below the poverty line, including 21.3% of those under age 18 and 8.8% of those age 65 or over.

== Education ==
Dover-Foxcroft is a part of Regional School Unit 68 (RSU68).

RSU 68 provides primary schooling for the town and several surrounding communities at three schools in Dover-Foxcroft: SeDoMoCha Elementary School provides for Pre-K–4th grade and SeDoMoCha Middle School (named for four of the communities that attend: Sebec, Dover-Foxcroft, Monson and Charleston) provides for grades 5–8.

Foxcroft Academy is a private secondary school that accepts all students from MSAD68 as well as others from across the state. It includes an international program, and has two dormitories and several boarding houses in town.

== Notable people ==
- Corey Beaulieu, lead guitarist for the metal band Trivium
- Mary Mitchell Birchall, first woman to graduate from a New England college
- Clarence Blethen, baseball pitcher
- Alfred Eliab Buck, U.S. representative from Alabama
- Stephen Decatur Carpenter, military officer
- Rob Derhak, bass player and vocalist for the jam rock band Moe
- Brita Filter, drag queen and activist
- Lisa Rowe Fraustino, children's author
- Frank E. Guernsey, U.S. representative from Maine
- Hannah Hanson Kinney, alleged serial killer
- Laurie G. Lachance, president of Thomas College
- Chad R. Perkins, state legislator
- Henry Otis Pratt, minister and U.S. representative from Iowa
- Nathaniel S. Robinson, Wisconsin legislator and physician
- Ninetta May Runnals (1885–1980), dean of women at Colby College
- Dave Schwep, director and photographer
- Douglas Smith, state legislator
- Lillian M. N. Stevens, temperance worker
- Henry M. Thompson, Wisconsin legislator and businessperson
- Amasa Tracy, military officer
- Leroy M. Washburn, Wisconsin legislator
