= Bob McRoy =

Baseball executive (died 1917)

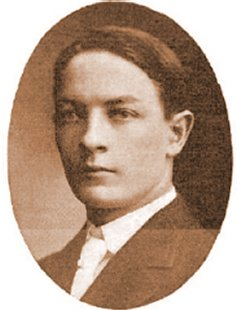
Bob McRoy.

Robert McRoy (died December 3, 1917) was a baseball executive.

McRoy served as secretary of the American League under Ban Johnson. When Johnson put control of the Boston Red Sox under Jimmy McAleer, he sent McRoy to serve as McAleer's secretary. McRoy worked for the Red Sox from 1912 through 1913. When Joseph Lannin purchased the Red Sox in 1913, McRoy returned to work for Johnson.

In the 1916-17 offseason, McRoy and Johnson recruited Jim Dunn to head up a syndicate to buy the Cleveland Indians baseball team from Charles Somers for $500,000. McRoy served as general manager of the Cleveland Indians from 1916 through 1917.

McRoy was married; his wife died of poisoning one week after her husband.
