= James C. Dent House =

Historic house in Washington, D.C., United States

- U.S. National Register of Historic Places
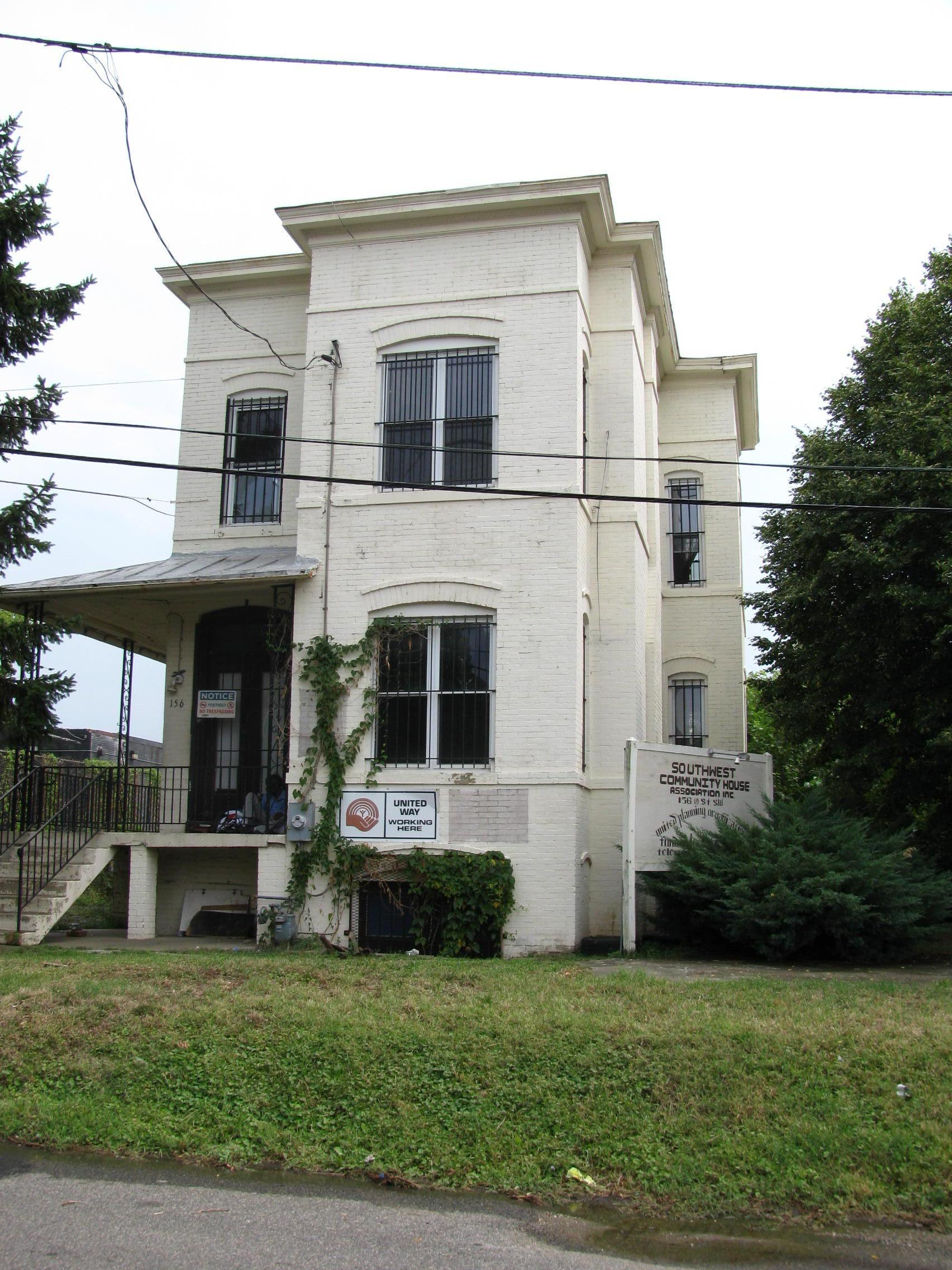
- North side of James C. Dent House as of 2011.

- Location within Washington, D.C.
- Location: 156 Q Street, SW. Washington, D.C.
- Coordinates: 38°52′14″N 77°0′48″W
- Built: 1906
- Architect: William James Palmer
- Architectural style: Federal
- NRHP reference No.: 10000880
- Added to NRHP: November 2, 2010

James C. Dent House is a historic home at 156 Q Street, Southwest, Washington, D.C., in the Buzzard Point neighborhood.

James C. Dent was born enslaved in 1855 in southern Maryland. He was a laborer, and he married Mary, a seamstress. In 1885, they helped found the Mount Moriah Baptist Church. It served as a Community Assistance Center.

Currently, Pepco owns the property. Living Classrooms Foundation began operating the facility in 2019 as a community center to deliver hands-on education and workforce development programming serving residents of all ages living in the surrounding public housing communities of DC's Ward 6.
