= Kevin A. Ross =

American lawyer

Judge on the Los Angeles County Superior Court
- In office 1999–2005

Personal details
- Born: Kevin Andrew Ross; June 1, 1963 (age 63) Los Angeles, California, U.S.
- Education: Morehouse College; Southwestern Law School

Kevin Andrew Ross (born June 1, 1963) is an American television personality, podcaster, producer, writer, and former judge on the Los Angeles County Superior Court in California. Since 2010, he has presided over the Daytime Emmy nominated syndicated reality courtroom show, America's Court with Judge Ross.

== Biography ==
=== Early years ===
A Los Angeles native, Ross attended Gardena High School, where he was student body president and president of the District-Wide Association of Student Councils for the Los Angeles Unified School District. He went on to become student body vice president and later president of Morehouse College, graduating from the Atlanta HBCU with a degree in Political Science. Ross received his Juris Doctor from Southwestern Law School. There, he continued in various leadership roles, including class president and chapter president of the National Black Law Students Association. Ross also became a member of the African-American Greek-lettered fraternity Kappa Alpha Psi.

=== Law and politics ===
An internship working for the Los Angeles County District Attorney's Office at the height of the crack cocaine epidemic convinced Ross that victims and those living in underserved communities needed advocates to represent their interests. He decided to become a deputy district attorney, and later worked as a hardcore gang prosecutor responsible for implementing controversial civil gang nuisance injunctions.

Ross entered politics in 1995 by running unsuccessfully for the Los Angeles City Council. That year he also co-founded The New Leaders, an organization seeking to train the next generation of African-American leaders.

=== Initial media employment ===
Ross began contributing op-ed pieces for newspapers including the New York Times. He was named co-host of "The People's Connection" on 103.9 KACE, before being given his own show on Disney's KTZN 710 The Zone. Ross later hosted and produced a weekend program on Talkradio 790 KABC until he retired to begin his judicial career.

=== Election to the California bench and subsequent removal ===
While attending law school, Ross interned for David W. Williams. A fellow black Republican, Judge Williams would administer the oath of office to Ross after he challenged an incumbent judge on the then Inglewood Municipal Court. At the time, he was the youngest elected in the state.

Ross was elevated the following year to the Superior Court after a ballot measure approved by California voters allowed for "unification" of municipal and superior court judicial roles. During his seven years on the bench, Ross handled over 60,000 matters, ranging from traffic and small claims cases, to criminal matters involving juvenile delinquents, sexually violent predators, and murderers. After being profiled on KCET's Life & Times Tonight, Ross began appearing on the local PBS program to discuss legal issues from a judge's perspective. He also frequently spoke about the importance of Blacks becoming police officers, prosecutors, defense attorneys and judges to ensure the judicial system treated minorities fairly.

In 2005 the Commission on Judicial Performance (CJP) removed Judge Ross from office, stating he violated judicial canons pertaining to defendants' constitutional rights, became embroiled in cases he was supposed to be adjudicating impartially, publicly commented on several matters pending before him during appearances on KCET, and improperly held himself out as a judge while actually acting as a private mediator in a television court show pilot. Ross unsuccessfully appealed the CJP's decision to the California Supreme Court. The ruling also made him ineligible to practice law in the state. Neither the initial Endemol and Tribune Entertainment-produced "Mobile Court", nor the follow-up Twentieth Television program "Ross is Boss", was picked up by television stations for syndication.

=== Return to media ===
Ross decided to start a communications company, become a blogger, and launch an eponymous Internet show on Blogtalkradio, a large citizen broadcasting network. "The Kevin Ross Show" became a leading current events and conservative political show on Blogtalkradio. It also ranked among the top five most popular shows on the social networking radio site.

In 2008, Fox News Radio and BlogTalkRadio partnered to bring listeners "Election 2008: Battle of the Blog Talkers." Fans of FOX News Radio's "FOX Across America" selected their favorite BlogTalkRadio hosts from each side of the political spectrum during a weeklong, one-on-one tournament. Ross was chosen as one of the eight hosts, and ultimately won the contest representing the political right.

At a 2009 business meeting with comedian Byron Allen to discuss an online media venture, Allen was so impressed with Ross that he made a deal on the spot, allowing Ross to host what would be the first of nine court shows for Entertainment Studios (ES). The following year, "America's Court with Judge Ross" launched as a daytime program. Entering its sixteenth season in September 2025, America's Court can also be seen on Justice Central, ES’ legal cable network.

Kevin Ross' acting credits include appearing as the judge in independent films "Blindfire" and "Broken Star (film)", and an episode of Bounce TV’s comedy series "In The Cut (TV series)". Additionally, the Netflix release "Ava (2020 film)" features Ross presiding over an America's Court case.

=== Entrepreneurship ===
Ross hosted Kevin Ross The Podcast on TheGrio's Black Podcast Network until the platform ceased production. Along with serving as one of the executive producers on America's Court, he has appeared on various cable and radio outlets such as Fox News, MSNBC, CNN, Black Entertainment Television (BET), NPR, and KJLH 102.3 FM as a legal, political and social commentator.

=== Personal ===
Ross is married with two sons and resides in the Los Angeles area.

== See also ==
- Black conservatism in the United States
