= Joseph Lannin =

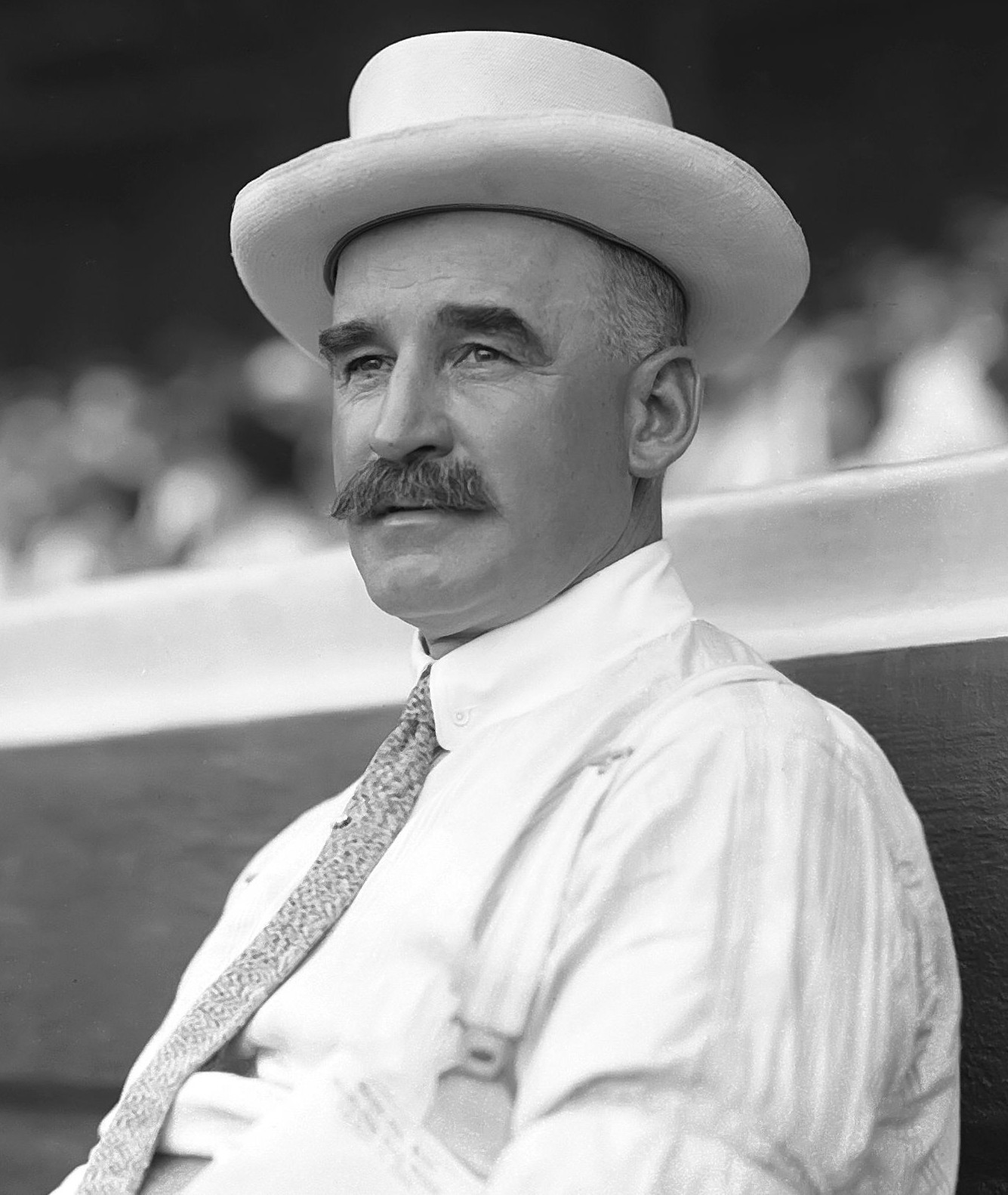
- Born: April 23, 1866; Lac-Beauport, Canada East
- Died: May 15, 1928 (aged 62); Brooklyn, New York City, U.S.
- Known for: Owner of the Boston Red Sox (1914–1916); Brought Babe Ruth to Boston; Real estate and commodities
- Baseball career

Member of the Canadian

Baseball Hall of Fame
- Induction: 2004

Joseph John Lannin (April 23, 1866 – May 15, 1928) was a Québécois and Canadian-born American baseball entrepreneur. He was the sole owner of the Boston Red Sox of Major League Baseball for most of the 1914 through 1916 seasons, during which the team won two World Series.

== Biography ==
Lannin was born on April 23, 1866, in Lac-Beauport, Canada East to John Lannin and Catherine Evans. His parents were Irish immigrants. Orphaned at the age of 14, Lannin migrated from Quebec to Boston, Massachusetts, where he worked as a hotel bellboy. Penniless, he had remarkably made his way from Lac-Beauport to Boston on foot. He married Hannah Furlong and had two children, Paul Joseph Lannin and Dorothy A. Lannin.

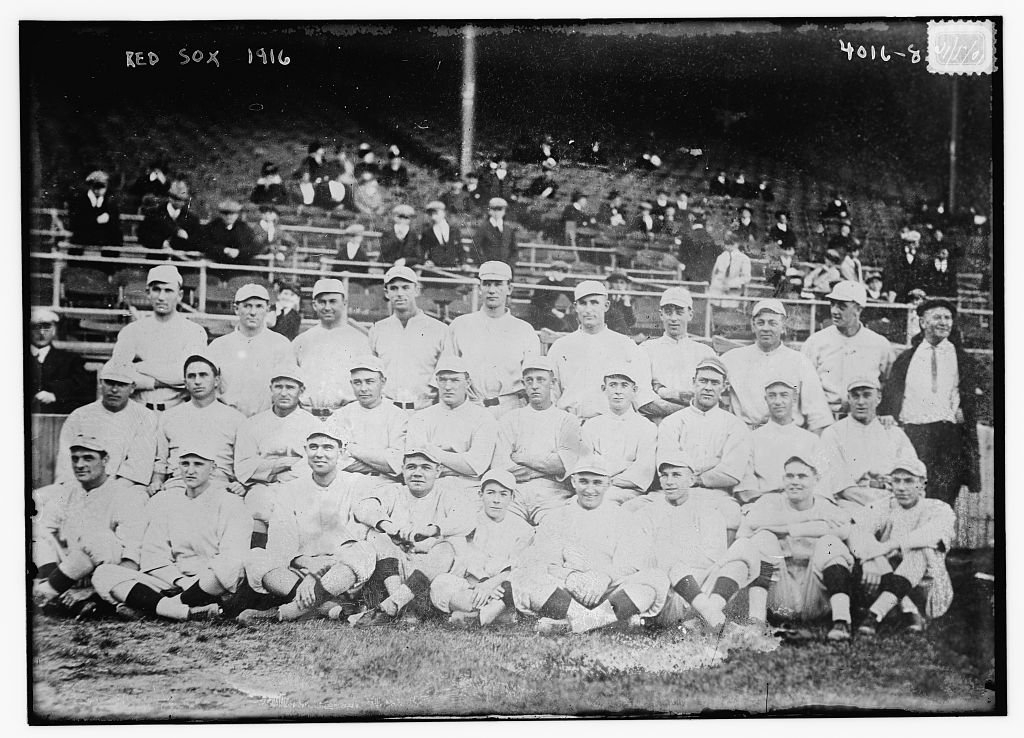
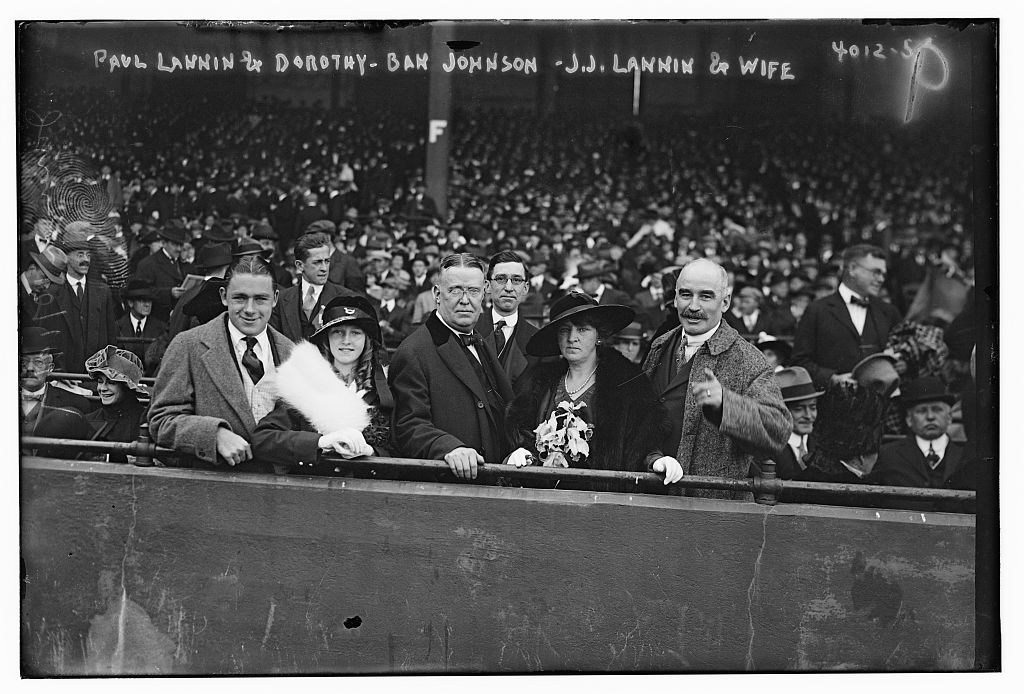
1916 World Series: Boston Red Sox (top image), Lannin (bottom image, pointing at camera)

Although he had limited education, Lannin was personable and possessed a quick mind. He soon learned about real estate by listening to conversations of the wealthy patrons at his hotel and taking advice from those who were willing to share their insights with him. A confident and knowledgeable Lannin invested his savings in the commodities market, making a small fortune. From there he began to acquire other businesses and eventually built an empire of hotels, apartment buildings, and golf courses. One of these enterprises would be The Hotel Gramatan in Bronxville, New York.

On December 21, 1913, Lannin and a group of investors purchased 50% of the Boston Red Sox baseball team from Jimmy McAleer and Robert B. McRoy. In 1914, he became the sole owner of the Red Sox and in that same year he purchased the rights to bring Babe Ruth to Boston. The team went on to win the World Series in 1915 and 1916.

Lannin sold the team in 1917 to Harry Frazee for $675,000. He was quoted as saying, "I am too much of a fan to be an owner." With the profit made from the sale of his team, he continued to invest in real estate ventures all around Boston and across New York State.

Lannin acquired Roosevelt Airfield on Long Island, where Charles Lindbergh began his historic transatlantic flight. Lannin provided Lindbergh with a room at his nearby hotel and watched the takeoff from Roosevelt Airfield on May 20, 1927.

Lannin died on May 15, 1928, aged 62, in Brooklyn, having fallen or jumped from a window of a hotel that he owned; it was not known if he had a medical issue or died by suicide. At the time of his death, his estate was valued at $7,000,000. He is interred at the Cemetery of the Holy Rood, Garden City, New York.

Lannin was inducted to the Canadian Baseball Hall of Fame in 2004.

Sporting positions
Preceded by Jimmy McAleer (his interest, December 21, 1913) and John I. Taylor (his interest, May 15, 1914)	Owner of the Boston Red Sox; December 21, 1913 – November 2, 1916 (with John I. Taylor, 1913–1914)	Succeeded by Harry Frazee
Preceded by Jimmy McAleer	Boston Red Sox President; 1913–1916	Succeeded by Harry Frazee
