= Broken Star (film) =

- Poster
- Directed by: Dave Schwep
- Written by: David Lee Brant
- Produced by: Howard Barish
- Starring: Lio Tipton; Tyler Labine
- Cinematography: Tyler Maddox
- Edited by: Kelly McCoy
- Music by: Josh Peck; Donny Dykowsky
- Production company: Kandoo Films
- Distributed by: Gravitas Ventures
- Release date: July 20, 2018
- Running time: 90 minutes
- Country: United States
- Language: English

Broken Star is a 2018 American psychological thriller film directed by Dave Schwep and starring Lio Tipton and Tyler Labine.

== Cast ==
- Lio Tipton as Markey
- Tyler Labine as Daryl
- Lauren Bowles as Kara
- Monique Coleman as Annie
- Kevin A. Ross as Judge Ross

== Release ==
In April 2018, it was announced that the rights to the film were acquired by Gravitas Ventures.

The film was released in theaters and on VOD on July 20, 2018.

== Reception ==
Noel Murray of the Los Angeles Times gave the film a negative review and wrote, "But when the plot finally kicks in, it feels like an afterthought — as though director Dave Schwep and screenwriter David Lee Brant realized too late that they needed something more than two damaged folks in a tacky old house."

Nick Schager of Variety also gave the film a negative review and wrote, "The story of a starlet under house arrest who forms an unhealthy bond with her landlord, it’s a low-rent effort that’s equal parts tawdry and tedious, although more problematic for its theatrical and on-demand fortunes is the fact that, from start to finish, it makes little lucid sense."
