= Nathaniel S. Robinson =

American politician (1827–1908)

N. S. Robinson

Member of the Wisconsin State Assembly from the Winnebago 2nd district
- In office January 4, 1875 – January 3, 1876
- Preceded by: William Pitt Peckham
- Succeeded by: Eric McArthur

Personal details
- Born: March 27, 1827 Dover, Maine, U.S.
- Died: November 5, 1908 Neenah, Wisconsin, U.S.
- Party: Republican
- Spouse: Sarah Greene (died 1915)
- Children: Sarah (Mac Isaac)^{(b. 1864; died 1952)}; Nathaniel S. Robinson Jr.^{(b. 1867; died 1940)}; Mrs. H. H. Hurd^{(died 1939)}
- Education: Bowdoin College; Harvard Medical School
- Profession: Physician

Military service
- Allegiance: United States
- Branch/service: United States Volunteers; Union Army
- Years of service: 1865
- Rank: Surgeon
- Unit: 1st Reg. Wis. Vol. Cavalry
- Battles/wars: American Civil War

Nathaniel Stillman Robinson, Sr., (March 27, 1827 – November 5, 1908) was an American physician and Republican politician. During the American Civil War, he served as a surgeon for the Union Army.

== Biography ==
Born in Dover, Maine, Robinson graduated from Bowdoin College and earned his medical degree from Harvard Medical School in 1852. In 1858, he moved to Neenah, Wisconsin, and practiced medicine there for most of the rest of his life. During the American Civil War, he was the assistant surgeon and then the surgeon of the 1st Wisconsin Cavalry Regiment. In 1875, Robison served as a Republican in the Wisconsin State Assembly.

Robinson died at his home in Neenah on November 5, 1908, after a period of disability. He was survived by his wife and three children.

== Electoral history ==
Wisconsin Assembly, Winnebago 2nd District Election, 1874
Party	Candidate	Votes	%	±%
General Election, November 3, 1874
Republican	Nathaniel S. Robinson	1,390	60.20%	+17.39%
Reform	J. M. Merrill	919	39.80%	
Plurality		471	20.40%	+6.02%
Total votes		2,309	100.0%	+28.21%
Republican gain from Liberal Republican				

Wisconsin State Assembly
Preceded by William Pitt Peckham	Member of the Wisconsin State Assembly from the Winnebago 2nd district January 4, 1875 – January 3, 1876	Succeeded by Eric McArthur
