= Jim Dunn (baseball owner) =

American businessman and baseball owner (1865–1922)

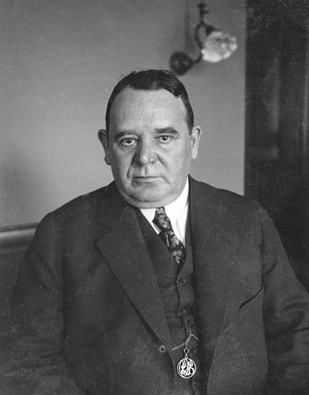
- Born: James Christopher Dunn; September 11, 1866; St. Anthony, Marshall County, Iowa
- Died: June 22, 1922 (aged 55); Chicago, Illinois, U.S.
- Occupation: Real estate developer
- Known for: Principal owner of Cleveland Indians

James Christopher Dunn (September 11, 1866 – June 9, 1922), also known as "Sunny Jim" Dunn, was a businessman and baseball team owner of the Cleveland Indians from 1916 until his death in 1922, during which time the team won its first World Series in 1920.

== Biography ==
Dunn was born in Marshalltown, Iowa and became wealthy through his partnership in a railroad construction firm. In 1916 he was recruited by American League president Ban Johnson and his secretary, Bob McRoy, to head up a syndicate to buy the Cleveland Indians baseball team from Charles Somers for $500,000. During his tenure the team's ballpark League Park was renamed "Dunn Field" and in 1920 the Indians won their first World Series. At his death at Chicago in 1922 at age 57, control of the team passed to his surviving spouse, Edith Dunn, and his estate, thus making Mrs. Dunn one of the first women to own a major league baseball team. In 1927 ownership of the Indians changed hands when Dunn's widow Edith, by then known as Mrs. George Pross, sold the franchise for $1 million to a group headed by Alva Bradley.
