= Harry Frazee =

American businessman (1880–1929)

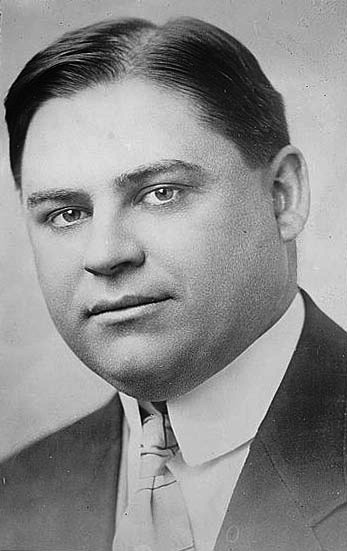
- Frazee in 1916
- Born: Harry Herbert Frazee; June 29, 1880; Peoria, Illinois, U.S.
- Died: June 4, 1929 (aged 48); New York City, New York, U.S.
- Known for: Owner of the Boston Red Sox (1916–1923); Selling Babe Ruth to the Yankees supposedly causing the Curse of the Bambino; Musicals

Harry Herbert Frazee (June 29, 1880 – June 4, 1929) was an American theatrical agent, producer, and director, and owner of Major League Baseball's Boston Red Sox from 1916 to 1923. He is well known for selling Babe Ruth to the New York Yankees, which started the alleged Curse of the Bambino.

== Early life ==
Harry Frazee was born June 29, 1880, in Peoria, Illinois, son of William and Margaret Frazee. He attended Peoria High School, where he was a baseball teammate of Harry Bay, who later played for Major League Baseball teams in Cincinnati and Cleveland. At 16, Frazee became assistant manager of the Peoria Theater. Within a year, he was player-coach of the Peoria Distillers semi-pro baseball club. As his theatrical endeavors continued, Frazee moved to Chicago, where he built the Cort Theater in 1907.

After several successful shows, Frazee went to New York City, where in 1913 he built the Longacre Theatre on West 48th Street and staged hit plays such as Fine Feathers by Eugene Walter and the musical Adele. He also promoted a boxing match between Jess Willard and Jack Johnson on April 5, 1915 in Havana, Cuba and was reported by then to be a millionaire.

Frazee was a Freemason.

== Owner of the Red Sox ==
Frazee bought the Boston Red Sox baseball team from Joseph Lannin for a reported $675,000 after their victory in the 1916 World Series. The Sox won another World Series title in 1918. The team finished sixth in 1919, and after that season Frazee started selling players to the New York Yankees, most notoriously Babe Ruth. He then left the Red Sox in bankruptcy while continuing to produce theatre shows. After the sale of Ruth, the team crashed into the American League cellar and did not finish above .500 until 1934. The Red Sox did not win another pennant until 1946, and did not win another World Series until 2004. The 86-year World Series drought is the third-longest in MLB history, trailing only the Chicago Cubs (108 years from 1908 to 2016) and Chicago White Sox (88 years from 1917 to 2005).

Frazee backed a number of New York theatrical productions (before and after Ruth's sale), the best-known of which is probably No, No, Nanette, which was once claimed, and later debunked, as the specific play that Ruth's sale financed (it was actually what paid off the Fenway Park mortgage that the Ruth sale included). He was the subject of an unflattering portrait in Fred Lieb's account of the Red Sox, which further insinuated that he had sold Ruth to finance a Broadway musical. This became a central element in the Curse of the Bambino.

The truth is more nuanced and has as much to do with a long-running dispute between Frazee and American League founder and president Ban Johnson as it does with Frazee's finances. Frazee was the first American League owner who Johnson had not essentially hand-picked, and was unwilling to simply do Johnson's bidding. Although they seemed to settle their differences when Frazee hired Ed Barrow, a friend of Johnson's, as manager, their relationship worsened again when Frazee loudly criticized Johnson's handling of the issues brought about by the United States entering World War I. For his part, Johnson was angered by the open presence of gamblers and bookies at Fenway Park. These factors led Johnson to actively seek to push Frazee out.

Additionally, Frazee's theater ventures didn't generate even a fraction of the capital needed to meet the Red Sox' expenses. He often found himself having to borrow from the Red Sox to meet his other commitments.

The dispute finally boiled over in the summer of 1919 when pitcher Carl Mays jumped the team. Johnson ordered him suspended, but Frazee instead sold him to the then-moribund Yankees. Johnson had promised Yankee owners Jacob Ruppert and Cap Huston to get them better players, but never followed through. The Mays flap divided the American League into two factions—the Yankees, Red Sox and Chicago White Sox on one side and the other five clubs, known as the "Loyal Five", on the other.

Under the circumstances, when Frazee finally lost patience with Ruth (see below), his options were severely limited. Under pressure from Johnson, the Loyal Five rejected Frazee's overtures almost out of hand. In effect, Johnson limited Frazee to dealing with either the White Sox or the Yankees. The White Sox offered Joe Jackson and $60,000, but the Yankees offered an all-cash deal: $25,000 up front and three promissory notes of $25,000 each, plus a $300,000 loan to be secured by a mortgage on Fenway Park. With the note from Lannin that he had used in part to finance his purchase of the Red Sox having come due in November 1919, Frazee had little choice but to take the Yankees' offer. Ruth officially became the property of the Yankees on January 5, 1920.

== Fenway Park ==
The Ruth sale cemented the Red Sox–Yankees alliance. A few months later, the two teams drew even closer together in a dispute over Fenway Park.

When Frazee bought the Red Sox, Fenway Park was not part of the deal. Instead, he rented it for $30,000 per year from the Fenway Realty Trust. A majority of the trust's stock was controlled by the Taylor family, publishers of the Boston Globe. The Taylor family had owned the Red Sox from 1904 to 1911 and built Fenway in the first place. They still held a small ownership interest. This put Frazee in a very difficult spot. If Johnson ever revoked the franchise, it would be relatively easy for a new owner to get a lease for the park. In August 1919, Frazee began negotiations to buy out the shares in the trust held by Lannin and the Taylors. In this way, if Johnson ever yanked the franchise out from under Frazee, any prospective owner of a Boston American League team would risk being left without a place to play.

However, Frazee had stopped paying installments because of a dispute over who owed Boston's share of MLB's settlement with the Federal League. In the spring of 1920, Lannin finally made good on a threat to slap a lien on the Red Sox. Since the lien barred Frazee from trading players or buying Fenway without Lannin's permission, Lannin effectively controlled the team. Lannin also threatened to sell his interest in the Fenway Realty Trust, which would have opened the door for a new owner to buy into the park if Frazee lost the franchise. Eventually, Lannin and Frazee reached a settlement. Lannin agreed to pay the Federal League bill and would not oppose Frazee's purchase of Fenway. In return, Frazee resumed payments. On May 3, Frazee and Taylor signed a deal to pay off the existing mortgage and make Frazee sole owner of Fenway Park.

As an additional security measure, Frazee secured a $300,000 loan from the Yankees and used a second mortgage on Fenway as collateral.

== Other deals with the Yankees ==
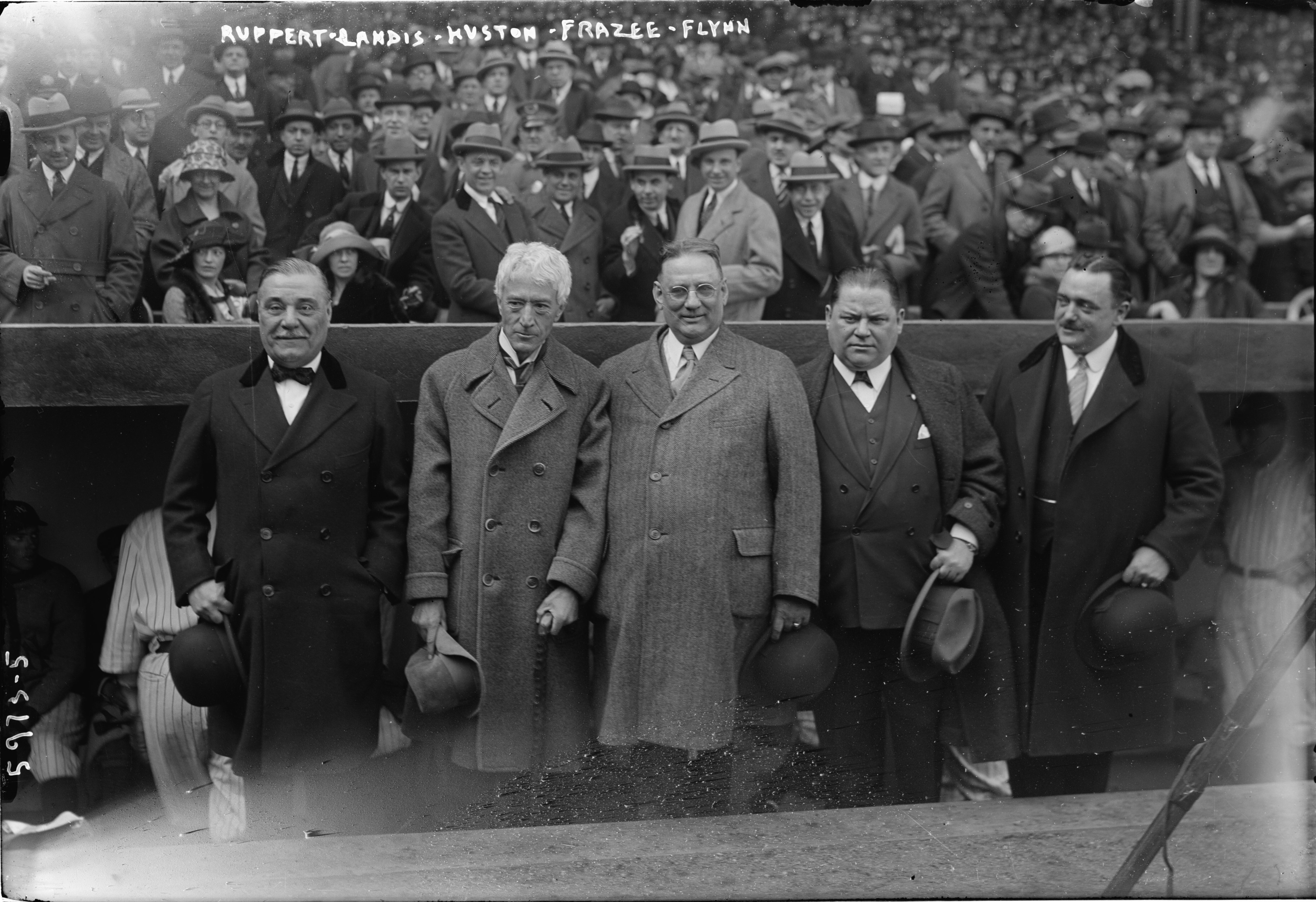
From left, Jacob Ruppert, Kenesaw Mountain Landis, Tillinghast L'Hommedieu Huston, Frazee, and Edward J. Flynn at Yankee Stadium in 1923

Frazee had every intention of using the money from the Ruth deal to get better players. However, his theater interests had not done particularly well since 1918, and he found it difficult to service the debt on both Fenway Park and the Red Sox. His cash shorts became even more acute after the remortgage of Fenway Park. He was thus forced to put the team's best players on the market in order to get cash. Unfortunately, he found it difficult to make deals with the "Loyal Five" even after Ruth left for New York. With the White Sox' reputation in tatters following the Black Sox Scandal, Frazee was left with little choice but to deal with the Yankees. Over the next three years, Frazee sold virtually all of the Red Sox' top players to the Yankees, netting him a total of $305,000.

Below is a record of the other trades (besides Ruth) that Frazee made with the Yankees from 1918 to 1923.

- Bullet Joe Bush—December 1921. Pitched in two pennant seasons for the Yankees. Traded for Rip Collins (pitcher), Roger Peckinpaugh, Bill Piercy, Jack Quinn.
- Joe Dugan—July 1922. Played for five Yankee pennant teams. Traded for Chick Fewster, Elmer Miller, Johnny Mitchell, Lefty O'Doul.
- Harvey Hendrick—January 1923. Never played for Red Sox; was in 1923 World Series with Yankees. Traded for Al DeVormer, who batted .254 after trade (Hendrick's lifetime average was .308).
- Waite Hoyt—December 1920. Traded (with Harry Harper, Wally Schang, and Mike McNally) for Del Pratt, Muddy Ruel, Hank Thormahlen, and Sammy Vick. Hoyt pitched for the Yankees in ten seasons, and was in seven World Series (including the 1931 Series, with the Philadelphia A's).
- Sad Sam Jones—December 1921. Traded with Joe Bush (q. v.). Pitched five seasons with Yankees.
- Carl Mays—July 1919. Traded to Yankees for players Bob McGraw and Allan Russell.
- Herb Pennock—January 1923. Traded to Yankees for Camp Skinner, Norm McMillan, and George Murray. Pennock stayed with the Yankees until 1933, pitching in five Series.
- George Pipgras—January 1923. Traded to the Yankees for Al DeVormer (supra). Pipgras never played for Boston; his eleven-year career included three Yankee pennant seasons.
- Wally Schang—December 1920. Traded to the Yankees for Pratt, Ruel, Thormahlen, and Vick. Caught for three Yankee pennant teams.
- Everett Scott—traded along with Joe Bush (q.v.). Scott set the consecutive-game playing record it took Lou Gehrig to break.
- Elmer Smith—July 1922. Traded to Yankees with Joe Dugan (q. v.). Was famous as first player (with Indians in 1920) to hit grand slam homer in World Series.

The above only includes the trades Frazee made to the Yankees from 1918 to 1923, when he was owner of the Red Sox. The Encyclopedia lists about 40 trades in all made by the Red Sox in those years, including to teams other than the Yankees.

It has been argued that the deals with the Yankees made a modicum of sense at the time, and only a stroke of bad luck turned them into Yankee heists. Notably, the players sent to Boston suffered a rash of injuries However, this is belied by the fact that Barrow became general manager of the Yankees in 1921. He'd managed nearly all of the players who came to New York in these deals, and was almost certainly aware of who he was getting. When the Yankees won their first World Series in 1923, they did so with a roster dominated by players acquired via their trades with Frazee. Half of their starting position players, as well as four-fifths of the rotation, came from the Red Sox.

== Sale of Red Sox ==
In 1921, an article in the Dearborn Independent claimed that Frazee was one of many Jews who had ruined baseball. Although Frazee was not Jewish, the article played up longstanding stereotypes about Broadway impresarios. Frazee was unable to respond, since at the time it was published he was not only dealing with a divorce, but the death of his father. The article wrecked any chance Frazee had of rehabilitating himself. Although he was forced to sell to a syndicate of Midwestern businessmen fronted by Johnson crony Bob Quinn, he held out for $1.2 million—nearly double what he paid for the team in 1916. The Red Sox had some of their worst seasons ever under Quinn's ownership after one of his principal investors died.

== Death ==
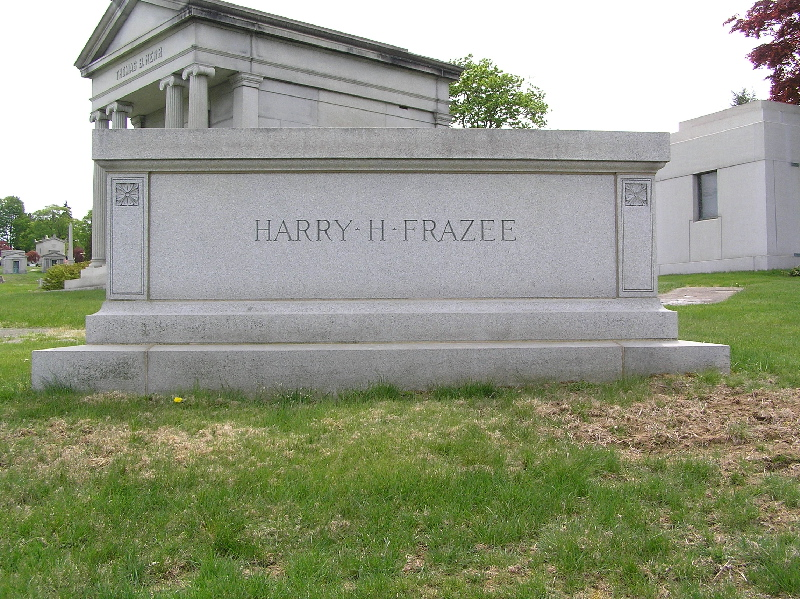
Harry Frazee's grave in Kensico Cemetery

In 1929, Harry Frazee died of kidney failure in his Park Avenue home with his wife and son at his side. He is interred at Kensico Cemetery. Lou Gehrig and Ed Barrow are also interred at Kensico.

== The Top 5 Reasons You Can't Blame... ==
In 2005, ESPN Classic aired an episode in The Top 5 Reasons You Can't Blame... series in which it examined the sale, and explained why Frazee cannot be held as the scapegoat:

- 5. World War I: With rosters depleted because of the war, Ruth saw action as both a pitcher and outfielder; the latter made him the home run hitter he would become. After the players returned, Ruth became bigger than the team because his home runs were the talk of baseball and he no longer wanted to pitch.
- 4. Ban Johnson: The president of the American League since its debut in 1901 effectively limited Frazee to the Yankees and White Sox as the only teams with whom Frazee could make a deal by pressuring the other five teams (the Cleveland Indians, Detroit Tigers, Philadelphia Athletics, St. Louis Browns and Washington Senators) not to make any trades at all with Frazee.
- 3. Babe Ruth's antics: He often spent evenings out in bars and was often drunk only hours before games. He also jumped the team several times, the final straw being in the final game of the 1919 season.

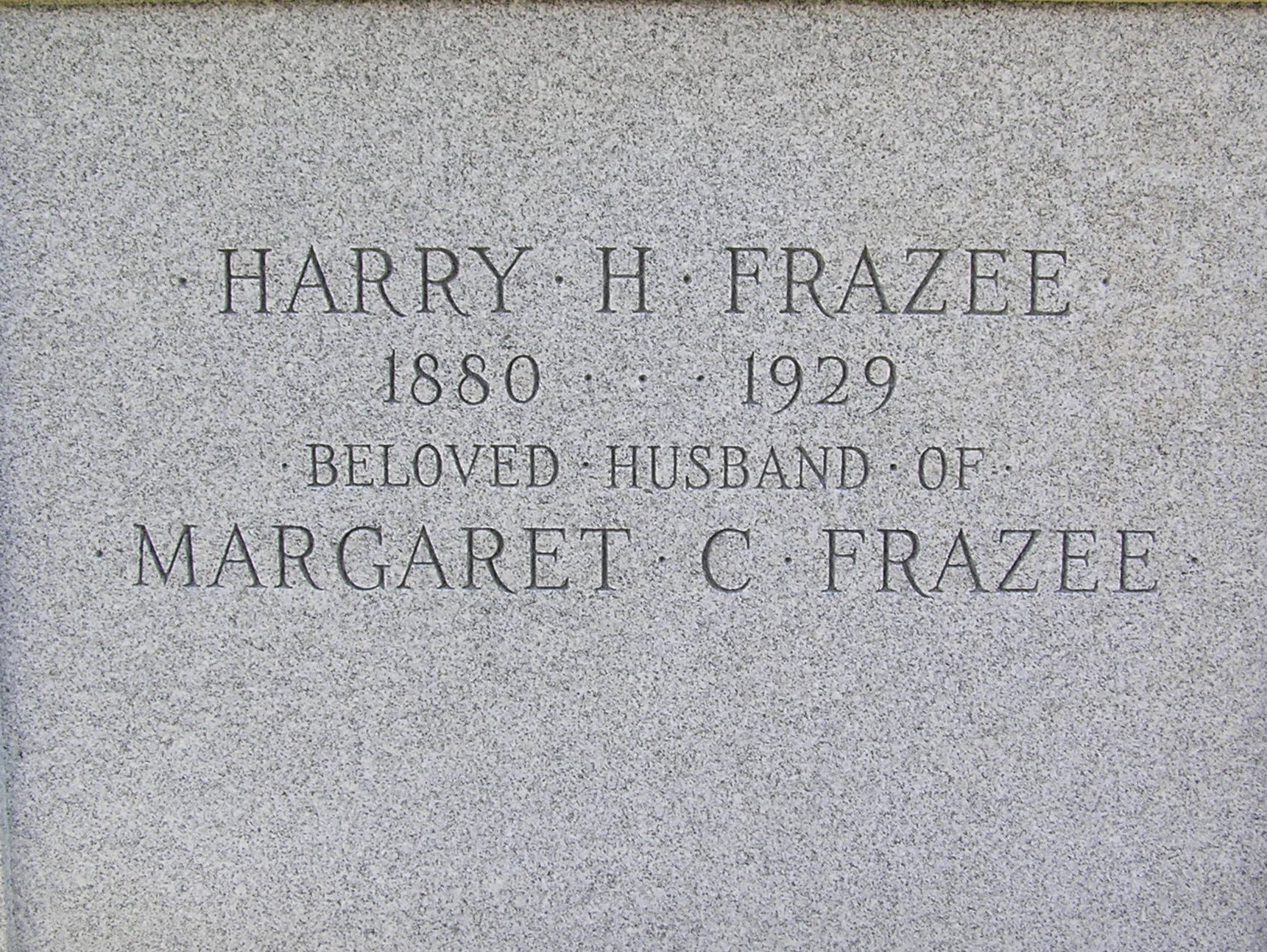
The inscription on Harry Frazee's tomb

- 2. Ed Barrow: Frazee's right-hand man, Barrow served as general manager and field manager. Like Frazee, Barrow also knew how much of a troublemaker Ruth was. When Frazee wanted to send Ruth to the Yankees, Barrow, for reasons unknown, said the Yankees didn't have any players he wanted. In a bizarre twist of fate, Barrow left the Red Sox after the 1920 season to become general manager of none other than the Yankees and built the team to World Champions by 1923 by acquiring as many as seven players from the Red Sox (four of whom had won the World Series in Boston in 1918).
- 1. Babe Ruth's holdout: Ruth forced Frazee's hand by holding out after the 1919 season, demanding $20,000 per year—twice as much as he had been making during the season. During the holdout, he planned other ventures, such as becoming a boxer and going into acting. Frazee was upset over the holdout because he had given Ruth bonuses after both the 1918 and 1919 seasons. Finally, with Ruth's demands so high and after several occasions in which Ruth had already jumped the team, Frazee felt he had no choice but to ship Ruth out.

An "honorable mention" was Shoeless Joe Jackson. Frazee wanted to trade Ruth to the White Sox for Jackson, but the Black Sox Scandal scuttled those plans.

== See also ==
- Curse of the Bambino
- Longacre Theatre
- No, No, Nanette
- A Pair of Sixes

Sporting positions
Preceded by Joseph Lannin	Owner of the Boston Red Sox; November 2, 1916 – August 2, 1923	Succeeded by J. A. Robert Quinn
Preceded by Joseph Lannin	Boston Red Sox President; 1916–1923	Succeeded by J. A. Robert Quinn
