= William Pitt Peckham =

American politician

William Pitt Peckham (October 28, 1836– after 1879 ) was an American businessman from Neenah, Wisconsin who served a single one-year term as a member of the Wisconsin State Assembly from Winnebago County.

== Background ==
Peckham was born October 28, 1836, in Ballston Spa, New York. He had a public school education.

== In Wisconsin ==
He came to Wisconsin in 1855, and settled in Neenah. He became a merchant, invested in the new National Bank of Neenah, and in 1866 became a stove manufacturer, building the Island City Stove Foundry.

By 1873, he had served as supervisor of the town board; president and trustee of the village, town treasurer and chief of the fire department.

In 1873 he was elected for the 2nd Winnebago County Assembly district (the Towns of Clayton, Neenah, Menasha and Winneconne, village of Menasha and City of Neenah) as a candidate of Wisconsin's Liberal Reform Party, a short-lived coalition of Democrats, reform and Liberal Republicans, and Grangers formed in 1873, which secured the election for two years of William Robert Taylor as Governor of Wisconsin, as well as electing a number of state legislators. He received 1,030 votes, to 771 for Republican P. Yerbeck (incumbent Republican Thomas McConnell was not a candidate). He was appointed to the standing committees on privileges and elections, and on medical societies.

He was not a candidate for re-election in 1874, and was succeeded by Republican Nathaniel S. Robinson.

In 1880 he was a member of Neenah's board of education.
