= American Woolen Company Foxcroft Mill =

- U.S. National Register of Historic Places
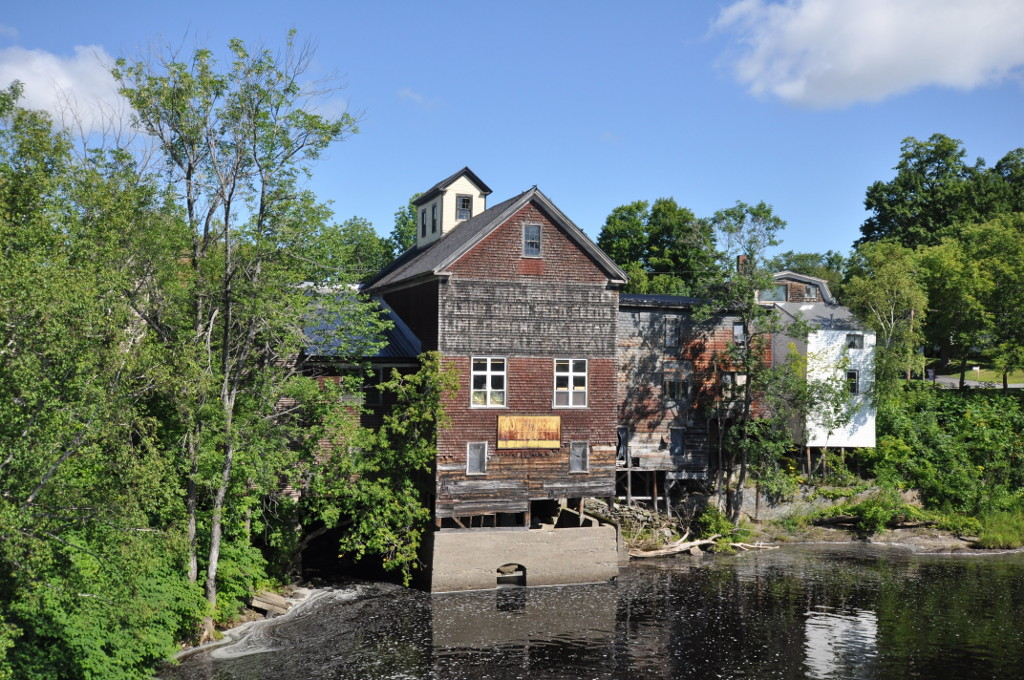
- Wooden buildings near the mill but never part of it.

- Location within Maine Location within the United States
- Location: Dover-Foxcroft, Maine
- Coordinates: 45°11′0″N 69°13′50″W
- Area: 2.77 acres (1.12 ha)
- Built: 1844
- NRHP reference No.: 12001068
- Added to NRHP: December 19, 2012

The American Woolen Company Foxcroft Mill or Mayo & Son Woolen Mill is a group of seven historic buildings and three structures on East Main Street in downtown Dover-Foxcroft, Maine. The district is located on 2.77 acres (1.12 ha). The Foxcroft Mill is located on the west side of the Piscataquis River, which flows through downtown Dover-Foxcroft. The buildings were built between 1844 and 1941, and have been listed on the National Register of Historic Places.

== History ==
The mill site has an industrial history dating to 1822, although the oldest surviving element of it, a foundation, dates to the 1844 mill built by James Mayo and several partners. Over the next century it went through a number of ownership changes, and the complex grew to include all of the surviving buildings by 1941. During this time the mill was one of the major employers in the region, producing woolen cloth which was carried by cart (and later truck) to the nearest railroad depot. The oldest standing buildings in the complex are wood frame storage buildings, one dated to c. 1879 with Italianate styling, and a second whose date of construction is uncertain, but predates 1882. One of the most unusual buildings is the 1908 concrete mill building, which is 23 bays long and three large bays wide. It is one of the earliest known uses of concrete as a structural building material in the state. The last building to be built, the 1941 storage and shipping building, was built on the foundations of Mayo's original 1844 mill, which was demolished to make way for it.

On December 11, 1946, an elevator dropped 35 feet at the mill, after which the cables and other items crashed through the roof. Two people were killed and 10 others were injured.

The textile business was shut down in 1953, and the complex was sold to Moosehead Manufacturing, which manufactured wood products (mostly furniture) on the premises. That business closed in 2007. The complex was listed on the National Register of Historic Places in 2012.

In 2014, the complex saw major renovations done and was rebranded as "The Mill at Dover-Foxcroft". The renovations, which include the addition of both commercial and residential space, were the largest private sector investments in Piscataquis County, Maine in decades.

== See also ==
- National Register of Historic Places listings in Piscataquis County, Maine
