= Mount Moriah Baptist Church and Cemetery =

Historic site in Roanoke, Virginia, US

- U.S. National Register of Historic Places
- Virginia Landmarks Register
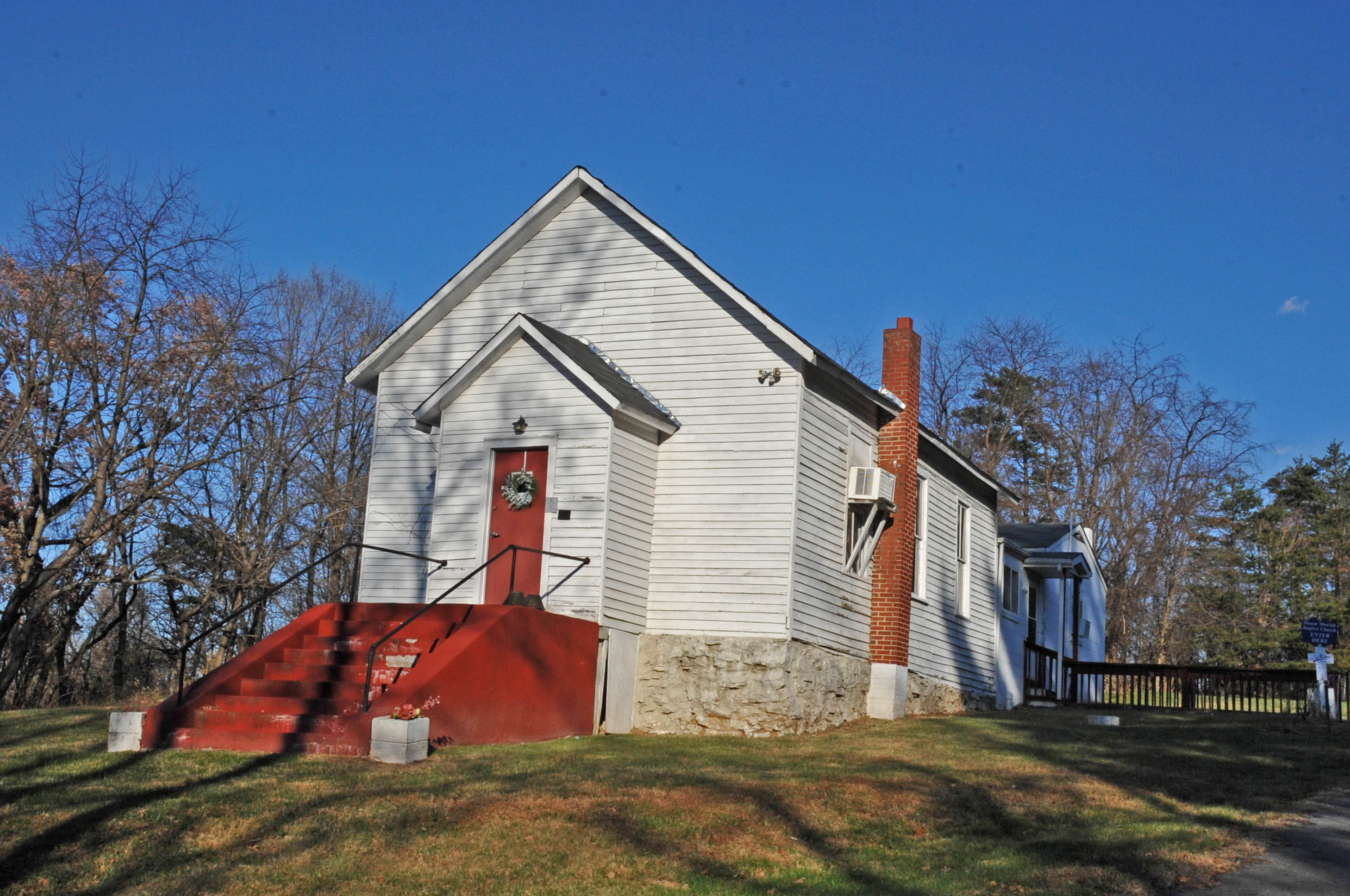

- Location within Virginia Location within the United States
- Location: 3521 E. Orange Ave., Roanoke, Virginia
- Coordinates: 37°18′15″N 79°53′28″W
- Area: 1 acre (0.40 ha)
- Built: c. 1870, c. 1908
- NRHP reference No.: 94001092
- VLR No.: 128-0234

Significant dates
- Added to NRHP: September 8, 1994
- Designated VLR: June 15, 1994

Mount Moriah Baptist Church and Cemetery is a historic African-American Baptist church and cemetery located at Roanoke, Virginia. It was built about 1908, and is a small, one-story, rectangular frame church sheathed in weatherboard. It consists of a main sanctuary, a front vestibule, and a rear chancel bay. The frame building sits on a raised foundation of uncoursed fieldstones. The associated burial ground contains over 100 interments from the 1870s through the present.

It was listed on the National Register of Historic Places in 1994.

Outside the entrance to the church is an historical marker that reads: "Mount Moriah Baptist Church. K-99. The members of Mount Moriah Baptist Church belong to one of the region's earliest African American congregations, originating in a Sunday school for slaves established in the mid-1800s by Dr. Charles L. Cocke, founder of Hollins College. The group gained permission in 1858 to build its first church. The present church, the congregation's third, was built about 1908. It was added to the National Register of Historic Places and the Virginia Landmarks Register in 1994. The nearby cemetery was expanded from a former slave burial ground."

"There are many unmarked graves at this location. The listing of names is complete as of 19 June 2007."

Recent upgrades in the church property included a new paved driveway from the City of Roanoke, and new kitchen and bathroom facilities, donated by local churches, individuals and organizations.
