= William D. Jones =

American politician

William D. Jones (October 11, 1830 – June 18, 1905) was a member of the Wisconsin State Assembly.

== Biography ==
Jones was born on October 11, 1830, in Salem Township, Westmoreland County, Pennsylvania. He was a miller by trade.

== Assembly career ==
Jones was a member of the Assembly during the 1876 session. He was a Republican.
