= Matthew Killilea =

American politician

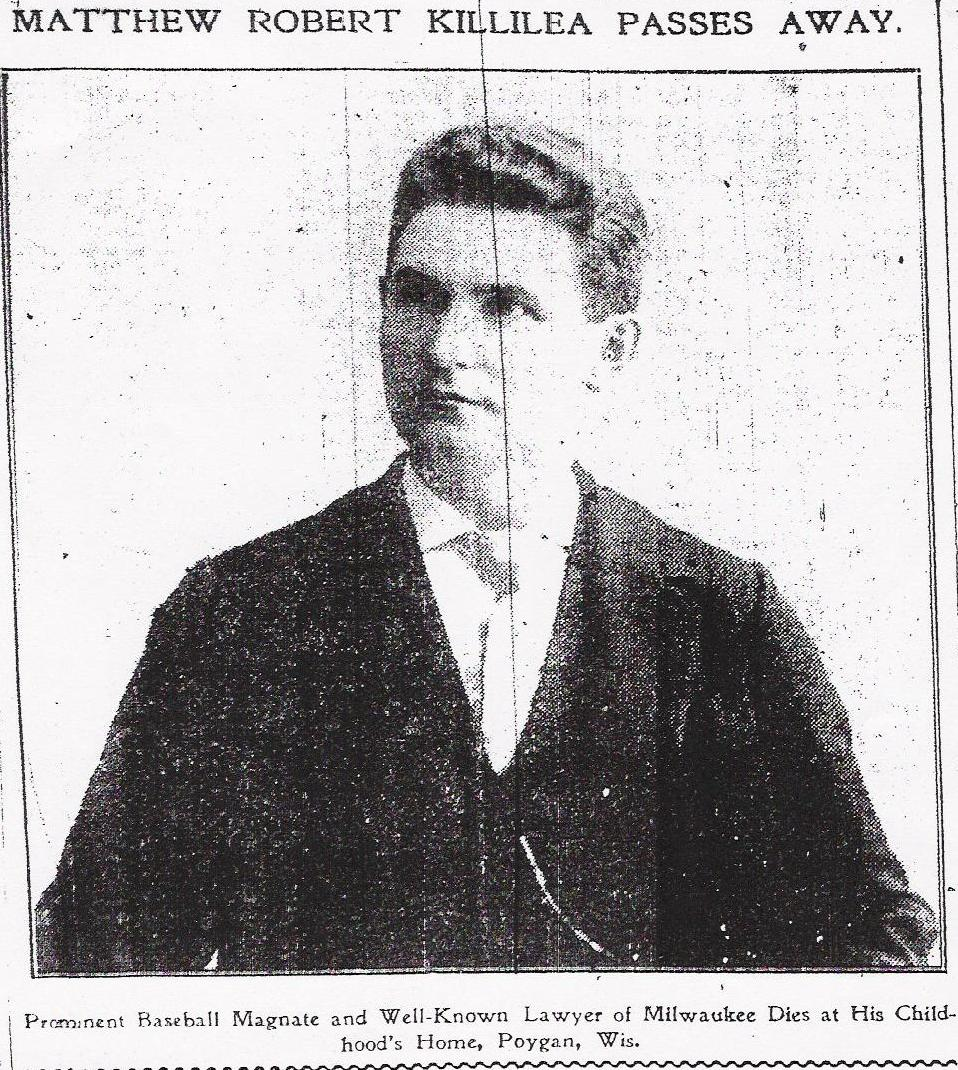
Killilea's obituary in 1902

Matthew Robert Killilea (November 7, 1862 - July 27, 1902) was an American lawyer and politician.

Born in Poygan, Wisconsin, Killilea went to the Daggett Business College in Oshkosh, Wisconsin and then graduated from the University of Wisconsin Law School. He practiced law in Milwaukee, Wisconsin and was appointed assistant district attorney of Milwaukee County, Wisconsin. Killilea served in the Wisconsin State Assembly in 1899 as a Democrat. He died in Poygan, Wisconsin. His brother was Henry Killilea.
