= George Gleason (politician) =

American politician

George Gleason was a member of the Wisconsin State Assembly during the 1876 session. Additionally, he was Supervisor and Assessor of Lima, Rock County, Wisconsin. He was a Republican. Gleason was born on November 11, 1810, in Farmington, Connecticut.
