= Union, Vernon County, Wisconsin =

Union, Wisconsin
- Town
- Location in Vernon County and the state of Wisconsin.
- Coordinates: 43°35′43″N 90°30′32″W
- Country: United States
- State: Wisconsin
- County: Vernon

Area
  - Total: 35.8 sq mi (92.6 km^{2})
  - Land: 35.8 sq mi (92.6 km^{2})
  - Water: 0 sq mi (0.0 km^{2})
- Elevation: 1,175 ft (358 m)

Population (2020)
  - Total: 809
  - Density: 22.6/sq mi (8.74/km^{2})
- Time zone: UTC-6 (Central (CST))
  - Summer (DST): UTC-5 (CDT)
- Area code: 608
- FIPS code: 55-81675
- GNIS feature ID: 1584314
- Website: https://www.townofunionvernon.us/

Union is a town in Vernon County, Wisconsin, United States. The population was 809 at the 2020 census. The unincorporated community of White City is located in the town.

== Geography ==
According to the United States Census Bureau, the town has a total area of 35.8 square miles (92.6 km^{2}), all land.

== Demographics ==
As of the census of 2000, there were 531 people, 165 households, and 131 families residing in the town. The population density was 14.8 people per square mile (5.7/km^{2}). There were 244 housing units at an average density of 6.8 per square mile (2.6/km^{2}). The racial makeup of the town was 99.44% White, 0.19% Native American, 0.19% Asian, and 0.19% from two or more races. Hispanic or Latino of any race were 0.19% of the population.

There were 165 households, out of which 41.2% had children under the age of 18 living with them, 67.9% were married couples living together, 6.1% had a female householder with no husband present, and 20.6% were non-families. 17.0% of all households were made up of individuals, and 10.9% had someone living alone who was 65 years of age or older. The average household size was 3.22 and the average family size was 3.66.

In the town, the population was spread out, with 37.1% under the age of 18, 6.0% from 18 to 24, 24.7% from 25 to 44, 22.6% from 45 to 64, and 9.6% who were 65 years of age or older. The median age was 36 years. For every 100 females, there were 89.6 males. For every 100 females age 18 and over, there were 98.8 males.

The median income for a household in the town was $35,417, and the median income for a family was $38,571. Males had a median income of $26,389 versus $18,646 for females. The per capita income for the town was $13,501. About 10.0% of families and 18.6% of the population were below the poverty line, including 30.2% of those under age 18 and 6.7% of those age 65 or over.

== Notable people ==
- Paul Haugh, legislator
- Timothy S. Jordan, legislator
