= Charles Somers =

American coal industry executive and baseball owner

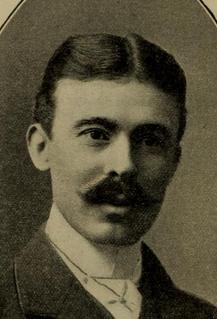
- Somers, c. 1904
- Born: October 13, 1868; Newark, Ohio, U.S.
- Died: June 29, 1934 (aged 65); Put-in-Bay, Ohio, U.S.
- Occupations: Coal industry executive; Owner of the Boston Americans (1901–1903); Owner of the Cleveland Indians (1901–1916)
- Known for: Key figure in foundation of the American League in 1901

Charles W. Somers (October 13, 1868 – June 29, 1934) was an American executive in the coal industry in Cleveland, Ohio, who also achieved prominence in professional baseball. The financial resources from his business interests allowed Somers to become one of the principal founders of baseball's American League in 1901. In the early years of the American League, Somers owned the teams now known as the Boston Red Sox and the Cleveland Guardians.

== Biography ==
Somers was born in Newark, Ohio, in 1868 and moved with his family to Cleveland in 1884. He attended business school, then worked for his father's coal company. He started his own coal company, sold it, and rejoined his father's company. By age 31, Somers was worth $1 million.

At the insistence of Ban Johnson, the first American League president, Somers and Jack Kilfoyl, who owned a popular Cleveland men's furnishings store, became the first owners of the franchise now known as the Cleveland Guardians. Kilfoyl was Cleveland's first team president and treasurer, while Somers was its vice president and main financier.

Somers was also the principal owner of the Boston Red Sox, a team which had no official nickname until 1908, but was initially sometimes called the "Somersets" in his honor. Residing in Cleveland and traveling to Boston, Somers was also the American League's vice-president during the trade war for independence of and equality with the National League which was won in 1903 with the playing of the first World Series.

Somers' money helped keep some American League teams afloat in their first years, including the St. Louis Browns, Charles Comiskey's Chicago White Sox and Connie Mack's Philadelphia Athletics.

Somers sold his interest in the Boston club in 1903 to Henry Killilea. In 1910, Kilfoyl took ill and sold his interest in Cleveland to Somers.

Somers invested in one of the first baseball minor league farm systems, ultimately controlling teams in Toledo, Ohio; Ironton, Ohio; Waterbury, Connecticut; Portland, Oregon; and the New Orleans Pelicans.

Facing pressure from the newly formed Federal League, in 1914 Somers transferred his Toledo Mud Hens to Cleveland to share League Park. This was done to keep the Federals out of Cleveland by ensuring there was already a ball game in Cleveland virtually every day of the season.

In 1915, the American League team in Cleveland previously called the Naps, in reference to player-manager Nap Lajoie, was renamed the Indians. Although Somers had kept the Federal League at bay, the new league still had its influence, forcing salaries higher. This, combined with poor attendance at League Park, along with other investments that did not work out, put Somers in a precarious financial position.

In 1916, although the Federal League had disbanded, it was too late to save Somers financially. He went broke with debts exceeding assets of $1.75 million, and at the insistence of his bank creditors, sold the Indians for $500,000 to a syndicate headed by Jim Dunn. The creditors did allow him to retain ownership of the Pelicans for sentimental reasons. The Mud Hens returned to Toledo in 1916.

After selling the Indians, he successfully rebuilt his business investments. At his death in 1934, at the height of the Great Depression, his estate was worth approximately $3 million.

Somers was married twice. He had a daughter, Dorothy (Mrs. W. W. Clark) from his first marriage. His second wife, Mary Alice Gilbert, survived him. Somers died in June 1934 at his summer house in Put-in-Bay, Ohio. He was interred at Lake View Cemetery.

Sporting positions
Preceded by American League established	Owner of the Cleveland Indians; 1901–1916	Succeeded by Jim Dunn
Preceded by Franchise established	Owner of the Boston Americans; 1901–1903	Succeeded by Henry Killilea
Preceded by Franchise established	Boston Americans President; 1901–1903	Succeeded by Henry Killilea
