= Poygan, Wisconsin =

- Town
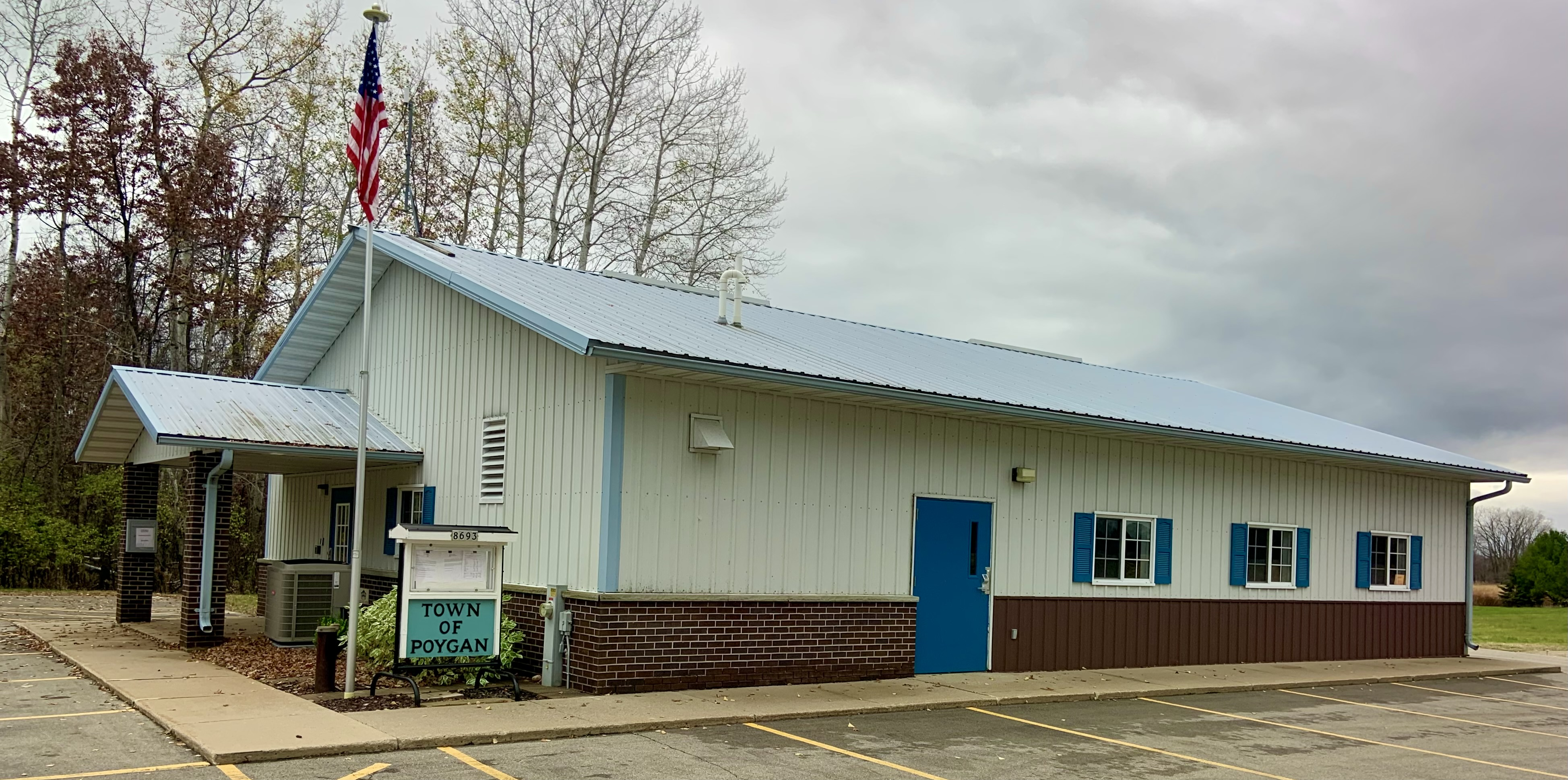
- Town hall

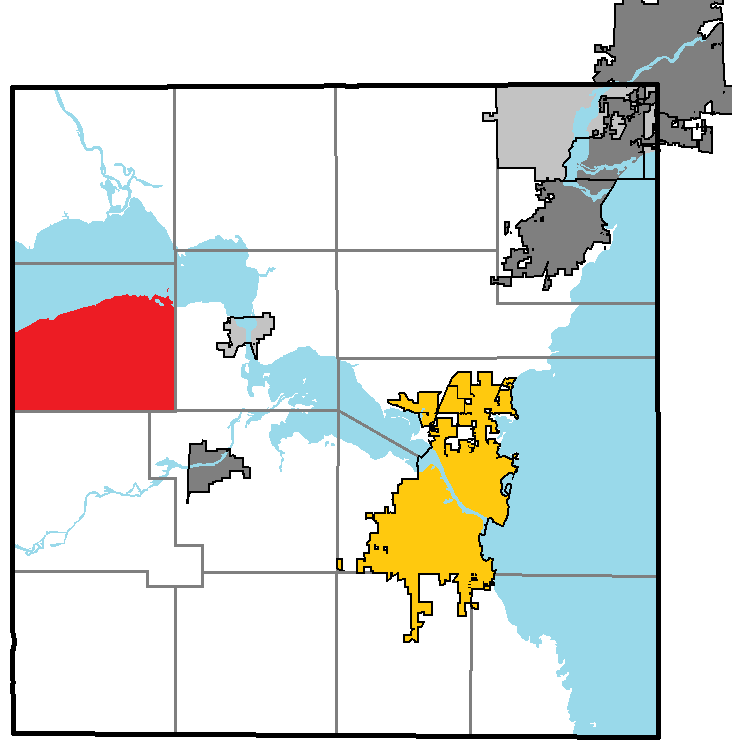
- Location of Poygan, within Winnebago County
- Coordinates: 44°6′9″N 88°49′21″W
- Country: United States
- State: Wisconsin
- County: Winnebago

Area
  - Total: 36.1 sq mi (93.5 km^{2})
  - Land: 23.1 sq mi (59.9 km^{2})
  - Water: 12.9 sq mi (33.5 km^{2})
- Elevation: 750 ft (230 m)

Population (2020)
  - Total: 1,261
  - Density: 54.5/sq mi (21.1/km^{2})
- Time zone: UTC-6 (Central (CST))
  - Summer (DST): UTC-5 (CDT)
- Area code: 920
- FIPS code: 55-64875
- GNIS feature ID: 1583968
- Website: www.townofpoygan.com

Poygan is a town in Winnebago County, Wisconsin, United States. The population was 1,261 at the 2020 census.

== Geography ==
According to the United States Census Bureau, the town has a total area of 36.1 square miles (93.5 km^{2}), of which 23.1 square miles (59.9 km^{2}) is land and 12.9 square miles (33.5 km^{2}), or 35.89%, is water, consisting mainly of a portion of Lake Poygan on the Wolf River.

== Demographics ==
As of the census of 2000, there were 1,037 people, 397 households, and 308 families residing in the town. The population density was 44.4 people per square mile (17.2/km^{2}). There were 532 housing units at an average density of 22.8 per square mile (8.8/km^{2}). The racial makeup of the town was 98.26% White, 0.39% African American, 0.10% Native American, and 1.25% from two or more races. Hispanic or Latino of any race were 0.58% of the population.

There were 397 households, out of which 31.5% had children under the age of 18 living with them, 68.5% were married couples living together, 4.0% had a female householder with no husband present, and 22.2% were non-families. 17.9% of all households were made up of individuals, and 8.1% had someone living alone who was 65 years of age or older. The average household size was 2.61 and the average family size was 2.96.

In the town, the population was spread out, with 24.6% under the age of 18, 5.5% from 18 to 24, 26.2% from 25 to 44, 28.5% from 45 to 64, and 15.1% who were 65 years of age or older. The median age was 40 years. For every 100 females, there were 111.2 males. For every 100 females age 18 and over, there were 110.8 males.

The median income for a household in the town was $53,947, and the median income for a family was $58,864. Males had a median income of $36,838 versus $25,288 for females. The per capita income for the town was $23,679. About 4.8% of families and 6.1% of the population were below the poverty line, including 9.9% of those under age 18 and 5.6% of those age 65 or over.

== Notable people ==
- Eddie Garcia, Green Bay Packers kicker and a member of the Packers Board of Directors was a resident.
- Henry Killilea, lawyer and one of the founders of baseball's American League was born in the town
- Matthew Killilea, lawyer and member of the Wisconsin State Assembly, was born in the town
- Sidney Shufelt, farmer, soldier and member of the Wisconsin State Assembly, was Town Chairman
