= Fergus Mills =

American politician

Fergus Mills (October 11, 1840 – January 23, 1924) was a member of the Wisconsin State Assembly during the 1876 session. He represented Crawford County, Wisconsin, as a Reformer Democrat. An English emigrant, Mills was born on October 11, 1840, in Oldham, Lancashire.
