= Karen Killilea =

American activist (1940–2020)

Karen Ann Killilea (August 18, 1940 – October 30, 2020) was the subject of two bestselling books by her mother Marie Killilea, Karen and With Love from Karen. These books were groundbreaking by asserting that children with cerebral palsy could lead productive lives.

Karen Killilea was born three months prematurely at a time when such babies rarely survived. As a result of her prematurity, she developed cerebral palsy. After she was diagnosed, Karen's parents decided to raise her at home, contrary to the advice of doctors to commit her to an asylum and forget her.

After visiting at least 23 doctors, they found one in Baltimore, Maryland, who taught them to do physical therapy with Karen at home, which was then a radical concept. They did so, spending two hours daily on her therapy for more than 10 years. Karen learned to walk with crutches, write, swim, and use her arms and legs.

She developed into a fairly happy teenager and adult who lived independently in New Rochelle, New York and worked for decades as a receptionist at a retreat house for priests run by Catholic monks. She traveled to Rome twice and met with Pope Paul VI. She zealously guarded her privacy and declined all requests for interviews.

She also served as an honorary member of the board of directors for the Cardinal Hayes Home for Children in NY.

She died on October 30, 2020 at age 80.

== Books about her ==
- Karen, Killilea, Marie (1952/1999) New York: Buccaneer Books (ISBN 1-56849-098-4).
- With Love From Karen, Killilea, Marie (1963) New York: Buccaneer Books (ISBN 1-56849-099-2).
- Wren, Killilea, Marie (Marie Lyons) (1954) New York: Dodd, Mead (the 1968 date given on Amazon is a reprint), (ISBN 0-440-49704-3).
