= Lima, Rock County, Wisconsin =

Town in Rock County, Wisconsin, United States

Town of Lima
- Town
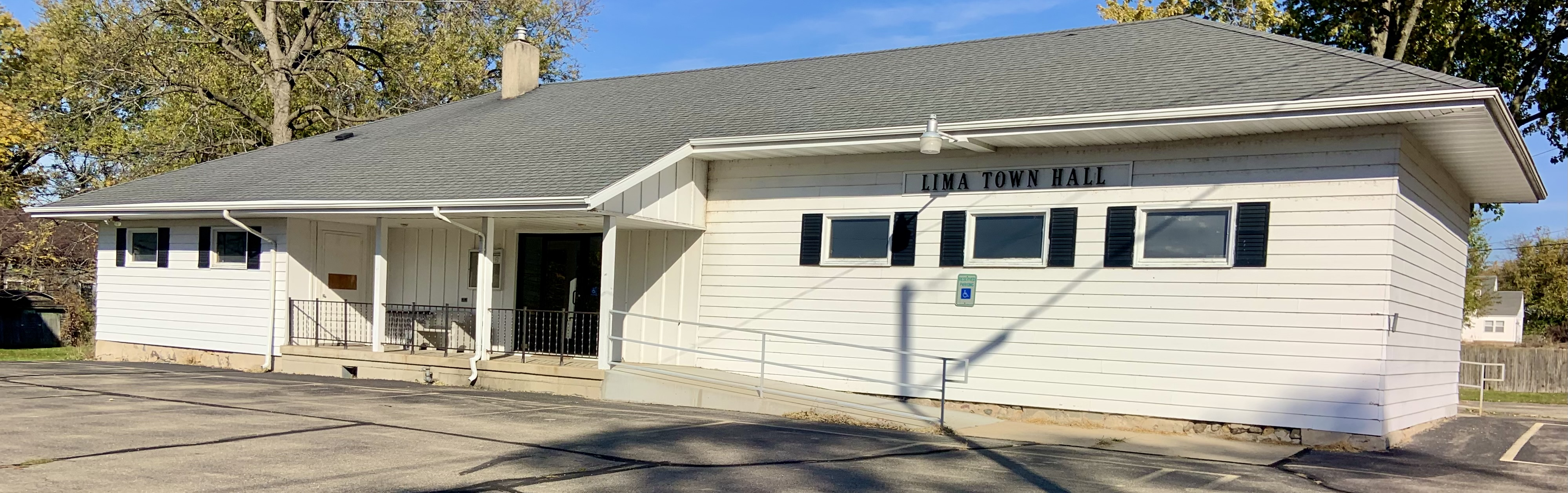
- Town hall

- Location of the Town of Lima in Rock County and the state of Wisconsin.
- Coordinates: 42°47′48″N 88°50′14″W
- Country: United States
- State: Wisconsin
- County: Rock

Area
  - Total: 36.4 sq mi (94.3 km^{2})
  - Land: 36.4 sq mi (94.3 km^{2})
  - Water: 0 sq mi (0.0 km^{2})
- Elevation: 883 ft (269 m)

Population (2020)
  - Total: 1,271
  - Density: 34.9/sq mi (13.5/km^{2})
- Time zone: UTC-6 (Central (CST))
  - Summer (DST): UTC-5 (CDT)
- Area code: 608
- FIPS code: 55-44125
- GNIS feature ID: 1583557
- Website: https://townoflimarockwi.com/

The Town of Lima Center is located in Rock County, Wisconsin, United States. The population was 1,271 at the 2020 census. The unincorporated community of Lima Center is located in the town.

== Geography ==
According to the United States Census Bureau, the town has a total area of 36.4 square miles (94.3 km^{2}), of which 36.4 square miles (94.3 km^{2}) is land and 0.03% is water.

== Demographics ==
At the 2000 census there were 1,312 people in 472 households, including 367 families, in the town. The population density was 36.0 people per square mile (13.9/km^{2}). There were 494 housing units at an average density of 13.6 per square mile (5.2/km^{2}). The racial makeup of the town was 92.38% White, 0.53% African American, 0.23% Native American, 0.30% Pacific Islander, 4.57% from other races, and 1.98% from two or more races. Hispanic or Latino of any race were 12.58%.

Of the 472 households 33.1% had children under the age of 18 living with them, 68.4% were married couples living together, 5.1% had a female householder with no husband present, and 22.2% were non-families. 17.8% of households were one person and 5.7% were one person aged 65 or older. The average household size was 2.75 and the average family size was 3.06.

The age distribution was 25.9% under the age of 18, 7.3% from 18 to 24, 29.8% from 25 to 44, 25.8% from 45 to 64, and 11.2% 65 or older. The median age was 38 years. For every 100 females, there were 108.9 males. For every 100 females age 18 and over, there were 114.1 males.

The median household income was $48,913 and the median family income was $54,821. Males had a median income of $33,646 versus $25,476 for females. The per capita income for the town was $20,718. About 3.1% of families and 6.3% of the population were below the poverty line, including 11.6% of those under age 18 and 1.5% of those age 65 or over.

== Notable people ==
- George Gleason, a Wisconsin legislator, lived in Lima
- Joseph Kinney, Jr., a Wisconsin legislator, lived in Lima
