= Leroy M. Washburn =

American politician

Leroy M. Washburn (February 12, 1847 - 1939) was a member of the Wisconsin State Assembly.

== Biography ==
Washburn was born on February 12, 1847, in Dover, Maine. Later, he married Ruth Lawrence. Washburn was a merchant by trade. He died in 1939.

== Political career ==
Washburn was a member of the Assembly during the 1876 session. Other positions he held include Chairman of the town board (similar to city council) of Sturgeon Bay (town), Wisconsin. He was a member of the Reform Party.
