= Albert T. Colburn =

American politician

Albert T. Colburn was a member of the Wisconsin State Assembly.

== Biography ==
Colburn was born on August 9, 1816, in Springwater, New York. He was a miller by trade.

== Political career ==
Colburn was a member of the Assembly during the 1876 session. Other positions he held include Chairman of the county board of Monroe County, Wisconsin. He was a Republican.
