= Timothy S. Jordan =

American politician

Timothy S. Jordan was a member of the Wisconsin State Assembly.

== Biography ==
Jordan was born on December 21, 1827, in Wayne County, Indiana. During the American Civil War, he served with the 12th Wisconsin Volunteer Infantry Regiment of the Union Army.

== Political career ==
Jordan was a member of the Assembly during the 1876 session. Additionally, he chaired the town board (similar to city council) of Union, Vernon County, Wisconsin. He was a Republican.
