= Marie Killilea =

American author and activist

Marie Joan Lyons Killilea (June 28, 1913 – October 23, 1991) was the mother of Karen Killilea and an American author, activist, and lobbyist for the rights of people with cerebral palsy. Her work culminated in the formation of the Cerebral Palsy Association of Westchester County. Later, she was a co-founder of the National United Cerebral Palsy Foundation.

== Parents, marriage and children ==
Marie was the daughter of Marie A. Powers, an American citizen born in Canada, and Thomas P. Lyons, a native of Wales. She had a younger sister, Kathryn "Kay" Marie Powers. Her father, a sportswriter for the New York Sun who later became co-owner of a Wall Street brokerage firm, died when she was 10 years old.

She married James Hines Killilea on July 25, 1933. They had five children (from 18 pregnancies): Marie Lyons, Katherine Anne (who died in infancy), Karen Ann, James O'Rourke ("Rory"), and Kristin Rose. They also informally adopted Gloria Kyle, although this adoption was never legally finalized.

The family lived first in Rye, New York; later they moved to Larchmont, where they bought a house they christened "Sursum Corda" with the proceeds from Marie's first best-selling book. In the books, Killilea notes that in Larchmont, their next-door neighbors were Jean Kerr and Walter Kerr.

== Religious faith ==
Marie and James Killilea were devout Roman Catholics and raised their children accordingly. Killilea expressed her religious convictions in her writings.

Karen won the 1953 Christopher Award. These awards are presented annually by The Christophers, a Christian organization founded in 1945 by the Maryknoll priest James Keller, to honor "books, movies and television specials that affirm the highest values of the human spirit".

== Education ==
She attended Mount St. Vincent Academy in Riverdale, New York and the Katharine Gibbs Business School.

== Cancer ==
In 1969, Marie was told by her doctors that she had a recurrence of lung cancer and had only three months to live. On referral, she went to Mercy Catholic Medical Center in Philadelphia for treatment by Dr. Isaac Djerassi. He prescribed huge doses of Methotrexate, a powerful drug, and in eight months, every trace of her cancer was reportedly eradicated.

== Death ==
Marie Killilea died in 1991 at age 78.

== Writings ==
Marie Killilea wrote a biography of her daughter, Karen, which became a best-seller in 1952. It detailed Karen Killilea's struggle to overcome the limitations of her cerebral palsy, and her family's fight to help her lead a satisfying life. A sequel, With Love From Karen, was published in 1963. The original was re-released in 1999. She also wrote a version of the story for children, "Wren".

== Publications by Killilea ==
Her books include;

- Karen, 1952 (re-released in 1999), New York: Buccaneer Books (ISBN 1-56849-098-4)
- Treasure on the Hill (1960)
- With Love From Karen, (1963), New York: Buccaneer Books (ISBN 1-56849-099-2)
- Wren, (1981), New York: Dell Publishing Yearling Book (ISBN 978-0440797043)
- Newf (1992)
