= Dave Schwep =

American cinematographer, director, and producer

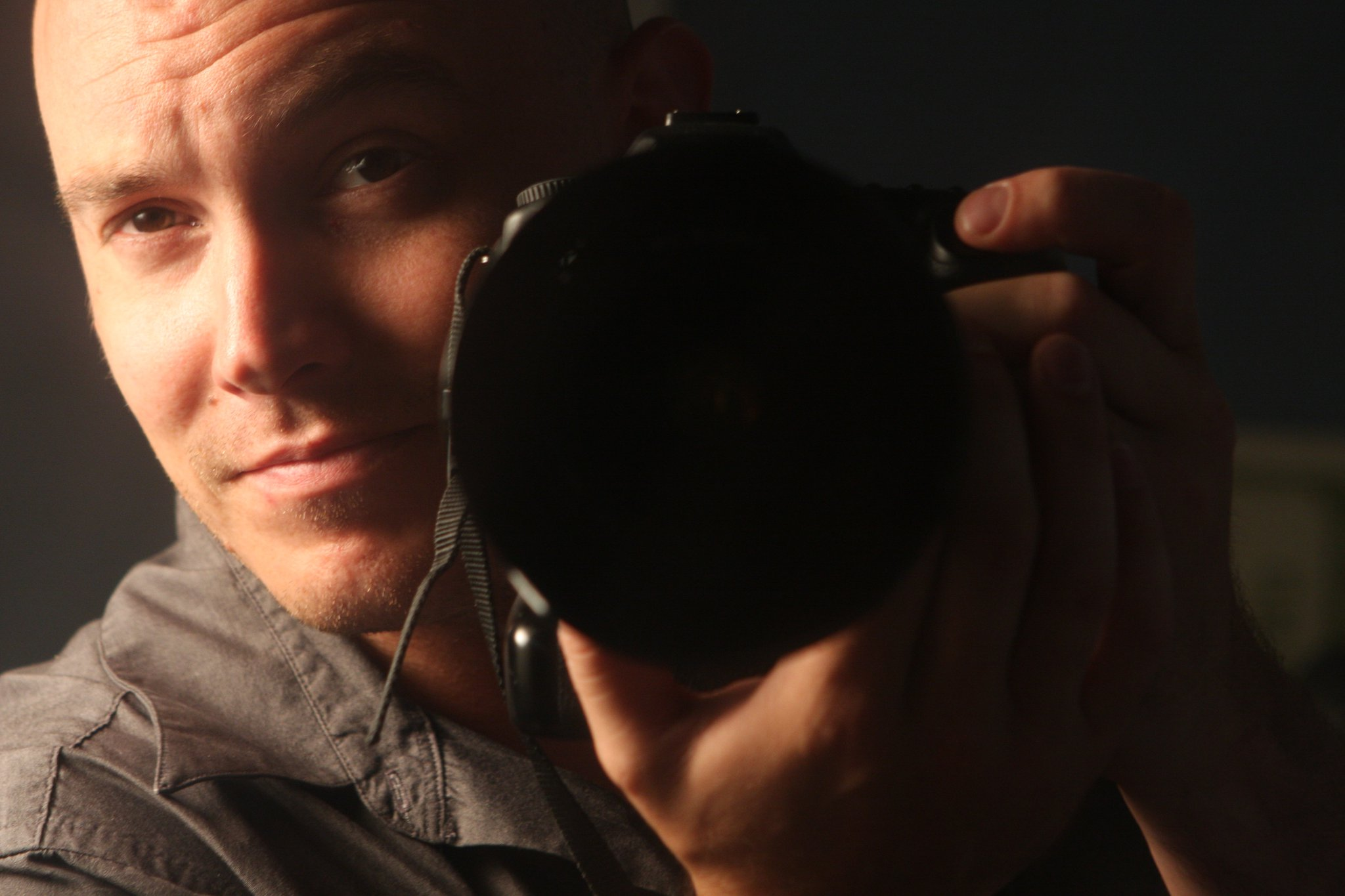
- A self-portrait
- Born: Dover-Foxcroft, Maine, US
- Occupations: Cinematographer, director, producer and crematoria
- Website: www.dreamsequences.com

Dave Schwep is an American cinematographer, director, and producer.

== Biography ==
Born in Maine and raised in Jacksonville, Oregon, Dave Schwep began working as a photographer at the age of 19 in Big Sky Montana. He then worked a 6-month commercial fishing venture in Alaska, traveled across country, and landed in South Beach, Miami where he shot fashion and glamour photography. In 1999 Schwep moved to Hollywood and pursued a full-time career as a professional photographer. He worked in head shot, editorial, fashion, and event photography using both film and digital photography. In digital photography, Schwep developed a process of using thousands of stills to create video. Schwep created the company Dreamsequences to continue this work.

Through Dreamsequences, Schwep worked on advertising, television promos and in 2008 he directed his first short, Bordeaux, starring Zachary Quinto. Schwep was the director of photography for the documentary, Stepping into the Fire (2011), shot in Peru, and worked as a photographer for charitable organizations in Haiti. Schwep won best documentary at the 2012 HollyShorts Film Festival as director, cinematographer, and executive producer of Bo, a documentary short. His television credits include House, Glee, Modern Family, It's Always Sunny in Philadelphia, American Idol, X Factor, and New Girl.
