= Henry Killilea =

American lawyer

Henry J. Killilea
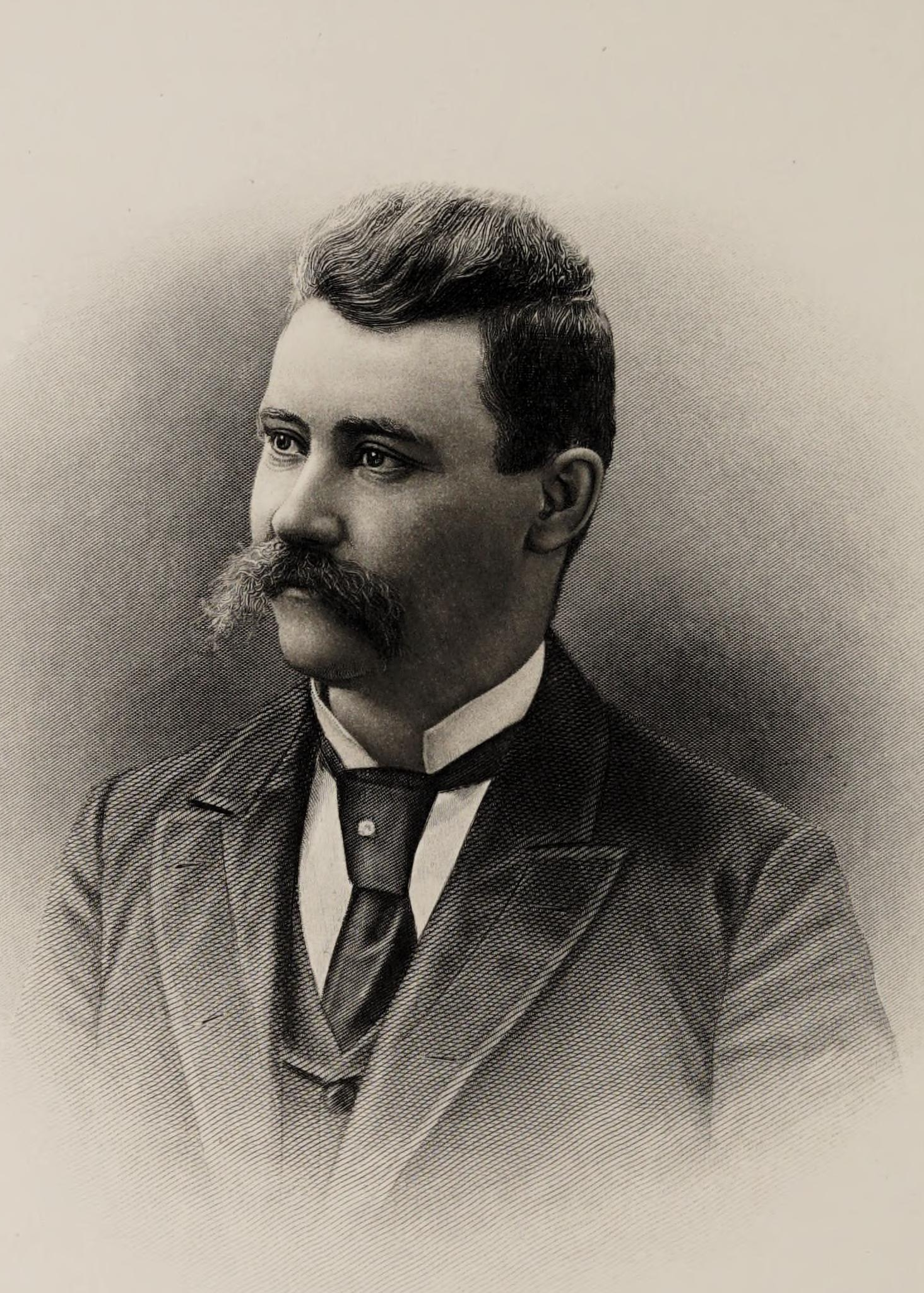
- Born: Henry James Killilea; June 30, 1863; Poygan, Wisconsin, U.S.
- Died: January 23, 1929 (aged 65); Milwaukee, Wisconsin, U.S.
- Resting place: Calvary Cemetery; Milwaukee, Wisconsin
- Education: University of Michigan
- Occupation: lawyer
- Known for: Co-founder of the American League, part owner of the Boston Americans and the Milwaukee Brewers
- Political party: Democratic
- Spouses: Louise Meindermann; (m. 1888; died 1920)
- Children: 4
- Parents: Matthew Killilea (father); Mary (Muray) Killilea (mother)
- Relatives: Matthew Killilea (brother)

Signature
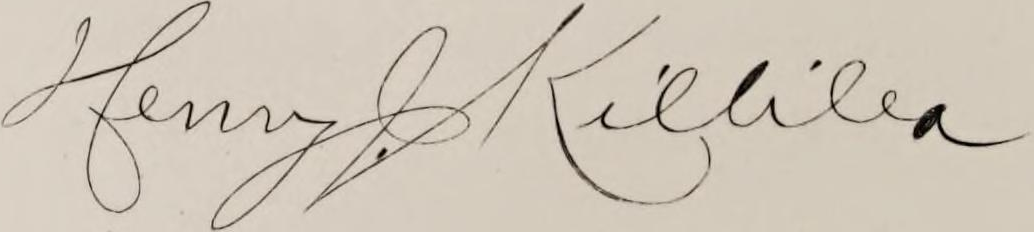

Henry James Killilea (June 30, 1863 – January 23, 1929) was an American baseball team owner and attorney. He was one of the founders of baseball's American League. He also played college football and baseball at the University of Michigan.

== Early years ==
Killilea was born in Poygan, Wisconsin, in 1863. His parents, Matthew and Mary Killilea emigrated from Ireland in 1849 and established a farm in Winnebago County, Wisconsin. Killilea was raised on the family farm and attended public school in Winneconne, Wisconsin.

After completing grade school, Killilea attended Oshkosh Normal School (now University of Wisconsin–Oshkosh) and then taught school at Clay Banks, Wisconsin.

== University of Michigan ==
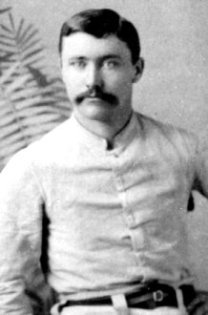
Killilea while playing on the 1883 Michigan football team

In the fall of 1882, Killilea enrolled at the University of Michigan, where he studied law. He also played for the Michigan Wolverines baseball team and for the 1883 and 1884 Michigan Wolverines football teams. He played at the forward position on the 1883 team, and as a senior, he played at the center position and was manager of the undefeated 1884 team that outscored its two opponents, 36-10. He graduated from Michigan in 1885.

== Legal career ==
After graduating from Michigan, Killilea established a law practice in Milwaukee, Wisconsin, in 1885. He specialized in trial practice, with much of his early practice constituting criminal defense. He gained attention for his defense of a school teacher who broke a student's neck. He later worked as counsel to the Chicago, Milwaukee & St. Paul Railroad.

== Professional baseball ==
Killilea also had a long association with professional baseball. His younger brother, Matthew Killilea, became the president of the Milwaukee Brewers of the Western League, and Henry became a minority owner.

=== "Godfather of the American League" ===
In the fall of 1899, Killilea and his younger brother, Matthew Killilea, were among the five men who founded baseball's American League, changing the name of the old Western League to the American League in 1900. The other members of the group were Connie Mack, Charles Comiskey, and the leader of the effort, Ban Johnson. Their first meeting was held in Killilea's home at 1616 Grand Avenue in Milwaukee. While Ban Johnson is regarded as the father of the American League, the Sporting Life in July 1904 dubbed Killilea "the godfather of the American League." Killilea's other significant efforts in the early years of the league include the following:

- One of the keys to ensuring the success of the new league was establishing a club in Chicago. Killilea prepared and notarized the articles of incorporation for the new Chicago White Stockings club.
- Killilea also played a leadership role in bringing American League baseball to New York. He was assigned by the league to seek financial backers for an American League club in New York for the 1903 season. The efforts to establish a club in New York were successful, and the New York Highlanders (later renamed the Yankees) began play in April 1903.
- In January 1903, Killilea served as chairman of the American League's "peace committee" charged with negotiating an end to the war with the National League. The platform developed by Killilea's committee included proposals to combat players jumping their contracts to switch leagues, creation of a reserve rule, and discipline for contract-jumpers. As part of the peace efforts, Killilea drew up the "National Agreement" under which both leagues thereafter operated. Killilea has been credited as "the principal factor" in the peace agreement.
- After his Boston team won the American League pennant, Killilea entered into personal negotiations with the owner of the National League champions to conduct a post-season series between the two leagues' champions to be called the World's Series. The result was the 1903 World Series, the first meeting between the league champions. Killilea has been credited with "putting together the first World Series of the twentieth century."
- After difficult negotiations with player representatives, Killilea began the tradition of sharing World Series revenues with the players. In October 1903, he announced that the World Series games had generated a profit of over $70,000 and that 75% of that profit would be distributed evenly among the players of the two clubs.
- Killilea was also credited with repeatedly keeping or restoring the peace between Ban Johnson and Charles Comiskey, two of the major figures in the league's early development.

=== Milwaukee Brewers ===
Upon the organization of the American League, Killilea became the majority owner of the Milwaukee Brewers. In 1901, the American League began to operate as a major league which included the Brewers. The 1901 Milwaukee Brewers finished in last place with a 48–89 record. In approximately July 1901, league president Ban Johnson began negotiating with Killilea and his brother, Matthew Killilea, with respect to moving the club out of Milwaukee. In December 1901, the majority of the league's owners decided to eliminate the Milwaukee club and move it to St. Louis as the St. Louis Browns. Displeased with the decision of the owners, Killilea announced his intention to sell his interest in the club. In late January 1902, Killilea and his younger brother, Matthew Killilea, sold their interested in the club to a group in St. Louis.

=== Boston Americans ===
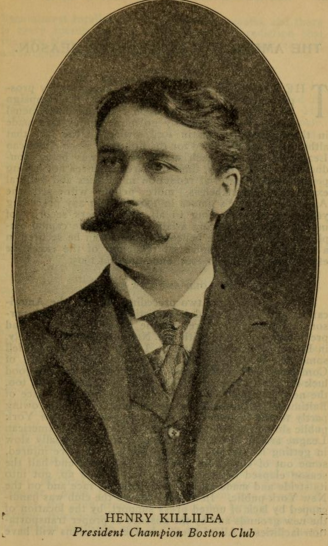
Killilea in the 1904 Reach guide

In late January 1902, shortly after announcing his sale of the Milwaukee club, Killilea announced that he had in August 1901 acquired five-ninths of the Boston Americans from Charles Somers and had more recently acquired the remaining four-ninths. However, it was agreed that Somers would continue to hold one share of stock so that he could remain the club's president. The Boston Post at the time described the Killilea brothers as "capable baseball men" and noted that Henry had "been immensely fortunate and built a big legal practice" and become "one of the wealthiest attorneys" in Milwaukee. Killilea reportedly paid $60,000 for the Boston ball club.

In 1903, Killilea authorized player-manager Jimmy Collins to spend approximately $56,000 of Killilea's money to put together a championship club. Killilea's 1903 Boston Americans featured Buck Freeman, who led the league in 1903 with 13 home runs and 104 RBIs, Cy Young, who led the league with 28 wins and 341-2/3 inning pitched, Patsy Dougherty, who hit .331 and led the league with 107 runs and 195 hits. The team won the American League pennant and went on to defeat the Pittsburgh Pirates in the inaugural World Series.

In December 1903, it was reported that Killilea sought to sell the Boston club, acquire the Detroit Tigers, and then move that club to Milwaukee. Killilea initially agreed to sell the club to John F. Fitzgerald, grandfather of John F. Kennedy, but American League president Ban Johnson refused to ratify the transaction. On April 18, 1904, Killilea sold the Boston club to John I. Taylor at a price reported to be $150,000. At the time, Killilea said, "It is with the deepest regret that I sever my relations with the Boston club. My business in Milwaukee demands it. The club is a money maker, and my experience in Boston has been of the pleasantest kind. It is the greatest baseball town in the country."

=== Baseball lawyer ===
After selling the Boston club, Killilea acquired an interest in the Cleveland Naps in 1904 and, in June 1904, was in discussions to purchase the Washington club. It is uncertain whether Killilea retained ownership in any club after the 1904 season. However, he remained actively involved in the game as one of the nation's leading baseball lawyers. After representing the American Association and the Eastern League in litigation seeking higher classifications from the National Commission, the Sporting Life praised Killilea for his "consummate skill and convincing eloquence" and added:

Not the least of Mr. Killilea's merits was the fact that he successfully combined aggressiveness with diplomacy; that as author of the present National Agreement he was familiar with his ground at all times; and that he possessed the acquaintance, respect, and confidence of nearly all of the major league magnates. Such advantages are possessed by no other lawyer of this generation so far as the National game is concerned, and they make Mr. Killilea the chief of the very small coterie of "base ball lawyers."

=== Milwaukee Brewers (American Association) ===
In January 1928, Killilea returned to baseball as a club owner. He purchased the Milwaukee Brewers of the American Association club. During his one year as the team's owner, the Brewers registered a 90-78 record.

== Family and death ==
Killilea was married in 1888 to Louise Meinderman who graduated that year from the University of Michigan. They had two children, Florence and Harry. He died in Milwaukee in January 1929, at age 65, after suffering from a heart attack at his Milwaukee law office. He was taken to a Milwaukee hospital where he suffered a paralytic stroke and remained unconscious for two days before his death. Following Killilea's death, his 24-year-old daughter Florence Killilea assumed control of the Brewers and became the only woman to own a baseball club.

Sporting positions
Preceded by Charles Somers	Owner of the Boston Americans; 1903–1904	Succeeded by John I. Taylor
Preceded by Charles Somers	Boston Americans President; 1903–1904	Succeeded by John I. Taylor
