= Patrick Griffin (politician) =

American politician

Patrick Griffin was a member of the Wisconsin State Assembly during the 1876 session. Other positions he held include Chairman (similar to Mayor) of Portland, Dodge County, Wisconsin in 1875. He was a Democrat. Griffin was born on March 14, 1841, in County Clare, Ireland.
