= John Stevenson (Wisconsin politician) =

American politician (1835–1908)

John Stevenson (April 11, 1835 – May 18, 1908) was an American politician. He was a member of the Wisconsin State Assembly.

== Biography ==
Stevenson was born on April 11, 1835, near what is now Montreal, Quebec. During the American Civil War, he served with the 43rd Wisconsin Volunteer Infantry Regiment of the Union Army. Events he took part in include the Battle of Johnsonville.

Stevenson was a member of the Assembly during the 1876 and 1889 sessions. Additionally, he was Chairman (similar to Mayor) of Harmony, Vernon County, Wisconsin, and in 1875 was a delegate to the State Republican Convention. He died in Springville, Wisconsin, on May 18, 1908, aged 73.
