= Sidney Shufelt =

American politician

Sidney Shufelt was a member of the Wisconsin State Assembly.

== Biography ==
Shufelt was born on April 19, 1824, in Franklin County, Vermont. He moved to Poygan, Wisconsin in 1854. He married Mary Walker on January 12, 1848. They had two children before her death in 1851. Shufelt later married Mary Condon on February 1, 1853. He died in 1910.

== Career ==
During the American Civil War, Shufelt served with the 7th Wisconsin Volunteer Infantry Regiment. He was a member of the Assembly from 1876 to 1877. Positions Shufelt held in Poygan include Town Chairman. He was a Republican.
