= James S. Dent =

American politician (1831–1906)

Member of the Wisconsin State Assembly
- In office 1876

Personal details
- Born: August 1, 1831 Hornellsville, New York, U.S.
- Died: May 23, 1906 (aged 74)
- Party: Republican
- Spouse: Lemyra J. Oliver (m. 1863)
- Occupation: Politician

James S. Dent (August 1, 1831 – May 23, 1906) from Menomonee, Wisconsin, was a member of the Wisconsin State Assembly.

== Assembly career ==
Dent was a member of the Assembly in 1876. He was a Republican.

== Personal life ==
Dent was born on August 1, 1831, in Hornellsville, New York. He married Lemyra J. Oliver on February 5, 1863. In 1876, he was an Assistant U.S. Marshal. Dent died of heart disease on May 23, 1906.
