= Eric McArthur =

American politician

Eric McArthur was a member of the Wisconsin State Assembly during the 1876 session. McArthur represented the 2nd District of Winnebago County, Wisconsin. He was a Republican. McArthur was born on September 10, 1824, in what is now Ottawa, Ontario.
