= Peter Zander (politician) =

American politician from Wisconsin (1832–1884)

Peter Zander (March 30, 1832 – October 12, 1884) was a member of the Wisconsin State Assembly.

== Biography ==
Zander was born on March 30, 1832, in Habbelrath, Prussia. He immigrated to the United States in 1852, settling in Milwaukee, Wisconsin. After spending a short time in Indiana, he returned to Wisconsin and settled in Cross Plains. Zander died on October 12, 1884.

== Career ==
Zander was a member of the Assembly during the 1876 session. In addition, he was a town supervisor of Cross Plains, Wisconsin and a county supervisor of Dane County, Wisconsin. He was a Democrat.
