= History of the Cleveland Guardians =

The Cleveland Guardians are a professional baseball team based in Cleveland, Ohio. They are in the Central Division of Major League Baseball's American League. Since 1994, they have played at Progressive Field. The franchise originated in 1896 in the minor Western League. After playing four years in Columbus and Grand Rapids, the team relocated to Cleveland for the 1900 season as the Lake Shores, when the league, renamed the American League (AL), was still officially a minor league. One of the AL's eight charter franchises, the major league incarnation of the club began in Cleveland in 1901.

== 1896–1946: Beginning to middle ==
The Columbus Buckeyes were founded in Ohio in 1896 and were part of the Western League. In 1897 the team was known as the Columbus Senators. In the middle of the 1899 season, the Senators swapped cities with the Grand Rapids Furniture Makers (see Grand Rapids (baseball)) of the Interstate League. The Columbus Senators became the Grand Rapids Prodigals of the Western League, while the Grand Rapids Furniture Makers became the Columbus Senators and remained in the Interstate League. (This Prodigals franchise is often confused with the previous Western League team in Grand Rapids (1894-1897), which later moved to Omaha, Nebraska and St. Joseph, Missouri in 1898, before settling in Buffalo, New York in 1899.) The Grand Rapids Prodigals finished the 1899 season in the Western League and relocated to Cleveland the following season. In 1900 the team was called the Cleveland Lake Shores. Around the same time Ban Johnson changed the name of his minor league Western League to the American League, which in 1900 was still considered a minor league. In 1901, when the American League broke with the National Agreement of 1883 and declared itself a competing major league, the Cleveland franchise was among its eight charter members and was called the "Bluebirds" or "Blues".

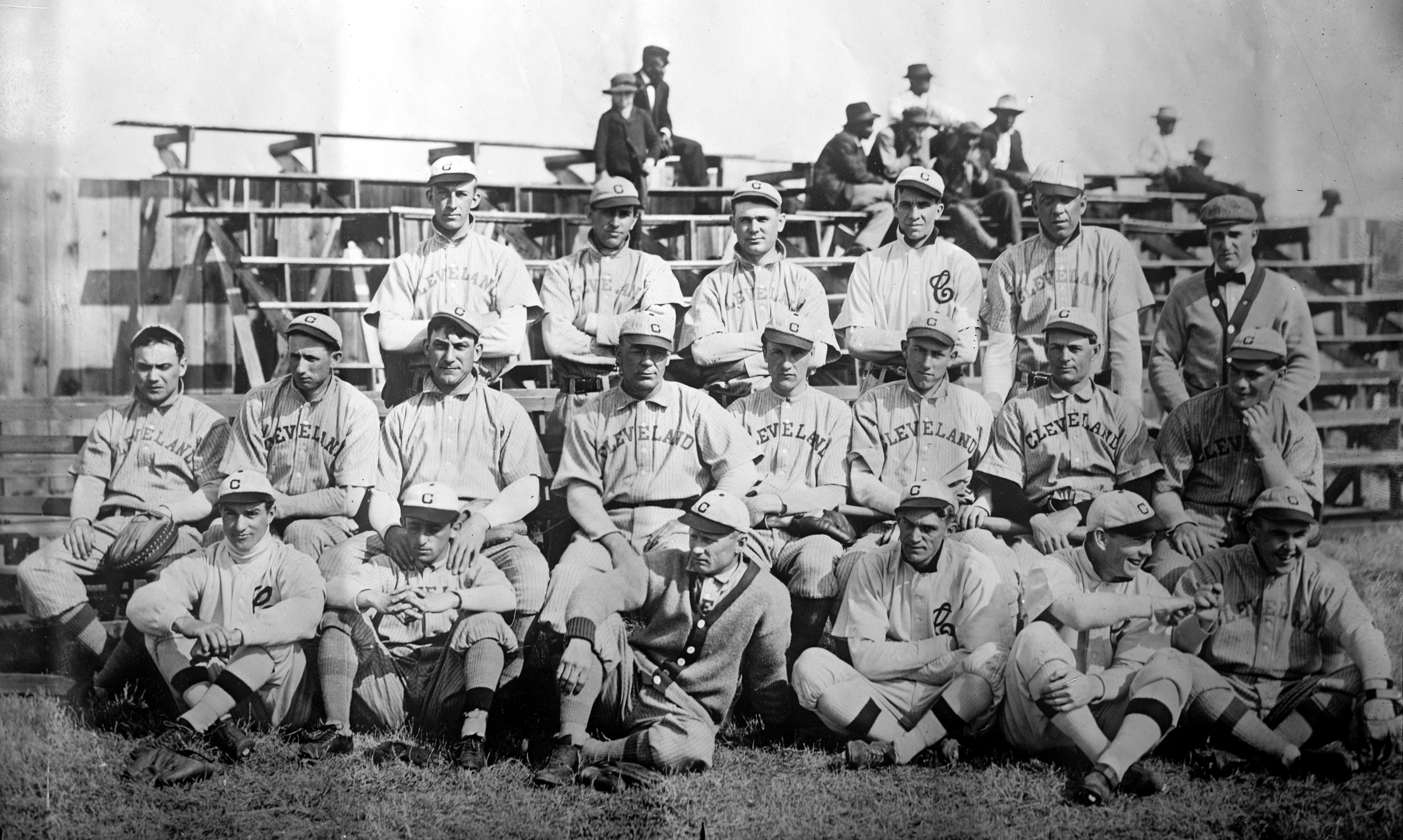
1909 Cleveland Naps

The new team was owned by coal magnate Charles Somers and tailor Jack Kilfoyl. Somers, a wealthy industrialist and also co-owner of the Boston Americans, lent money to other team owners, including Connie Mack's Philadelphia Athletics, to keep them and the new league afloat. Players did not think the name "Bluebirds" was suitable for a baseball team. Writers frequently shortened it to "Blues" due to the players' all-blue uniforms, but the players did not like this name either. The players themselves tried to change the name to "Bronchos" in 1902, but it never really caught on.

The Bluebirds suffered from financial problems in their first two seasons. This led Somers to seriously consider moving to either Pittsburgh or Cincinnati. Relief came in 1902 as a result of the conflict between the National and American Leagues. In 1901, Napoleon "Nap" Lajoie, the Philadelphia Phillies' star second baseman, jumped to the A's after his contract was capped at $2,400 per year—one of the highest-profile players to jump to the upstart AL. The Phillies subsequently filed an injunction to force Lajoie's return, which was granted by the Pennsylvania Supreme Court. The injunction appeared to doom any hopes of an early settlement between the warring leagues. However, a lawyer discovered that the injunction was only enforceable in the commonwealth of Pennsylvania. Mack, partly to thank Somers for his past financial support, agreed to trade Lajoie to the then-moribund Blues, who offered $25,000 salary over three years. Due to the injunction, however, Lajoie had to sit out any games played against the A's in Philadelphia. Lajoie arrived in Cleveland on June 4 and was an immediate hit, drawing 10,000 fans to League Park. Soon afterward, he was named team captain, and the team was called the "Naps" after a newspaper conducted a write-in contest.

Lajoie was named manager in 1905, and the team's fortunes improved somewhat. They finished half a game short of the pennant in 1908. However, the success did not last and Lajoie resigned during the 1909 season as manager but remained on as a player.

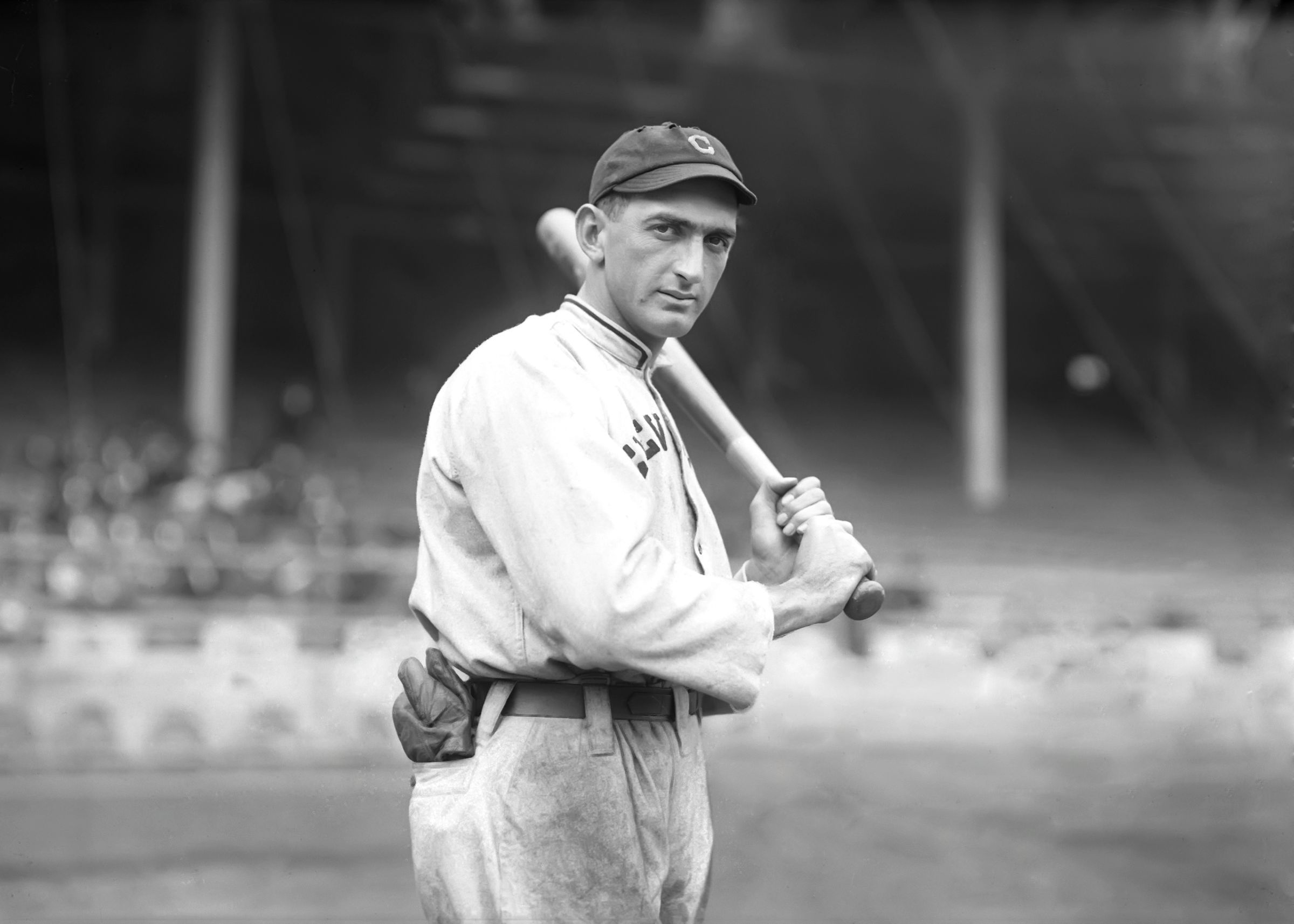
Shoeless Joe Jackson was an Indians outfielder from 1910 to 1915, and still holds franchise records for both triples in a season and career batting average.

After that, the team began to unravel, leading Kilfoyl to sell his share of the team to Somers. Cy Young, who returned to Cleveland in 1909, was ineffective for most of his three remaining years and Addie Joss died from tubercular meningitis prior to the 1911 season.

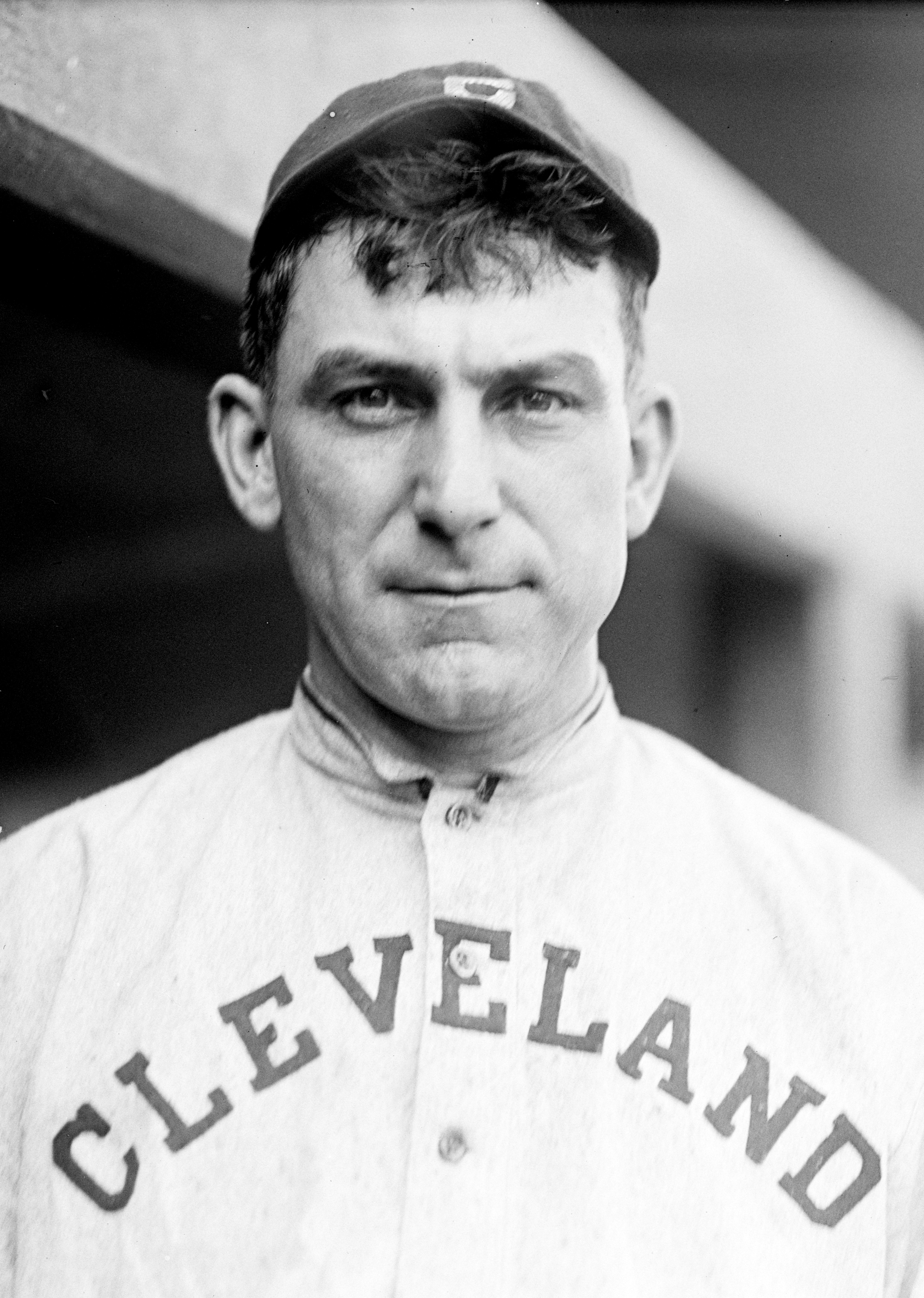
Nap Lajoie 1913

Despite a strong lineup anchored by the potent Lajoie and Shoeless Joe Jackson, poor pitching kept the team below third place for most of the next decade. One reporter referred to the team as the Napkins, "because they fold up so easily". The team hit bottom in 1914 and 1915, finishing in the cellar both years.

1915 brought significant changes to the team. Lajoie, nearly 40 years old, was no longer a top hitter in the league, batting only .258 in 1914. With Lajoie engaged in a feud with manager Joe Birmingham, the team sold Lajoie back to the A's.

With Lajoie gone, the club needed a new name. Somers asked the local baseball writers to come up with a new name, and based on their input, the team was renamed the Cleveland Indians. It is claimed that the nickname "Indians" references Cleveland Spiders baseball club during the time when Louis Sockalexis, a Native American, had played in Cleveland (1897–1899); however this is contested by sportswriter Joe Posnanski who argues "Why exactly would people in Cleveland—this in a time when Native Americans were generally viewed as subhuman in America—name their team after a relatively minor and certainly troubled outfielder?" Sockalexis played only 96 games over three seasons, compiling just 367 at bats in his career. Sockalexis also "had to deal with horrendous racism, terrible taunts, whoops from the crowd, and so on," according to Posnanski. According to history professor Jonathan Zimmerman, the franchise was named the Indians by local baseball writers not to honor Sockalexis, but as a reference to the "fun" that he would inspire in crowds and the fact that journalists jokingly referred to the club as the "Cleveland Indians", even though it was officially named the Spiders. "In place of the Naps, we'll have the Indians, on the warpath all the time, and eager for scalps to dangle at their belts," wrote an article in the Cleveland Leader of January 17, 1915.

At the same time as the team was renamed, Somers' business ventures began to fail, leaving him deeply in debt. With the Indians playing poorly, attendance and revenue suffered. Somers decided to trade Jackson midway through the 1915 season for two players and $31,500, one of the largest sums paid for a player at the time.

=== 1916 to 1926: Ownership change and first World Series title ===
By 1916, Somers was at the end of his tether, and sold the team to a syndicate headed by Chicago railroad contractor James C. "Jack" Dunn. Manager Lee Fohl, who had taken over in early 1915, acquired two minor league pitchers, Stan Coveleski and Jim Bagby and traded for center fielder Tris Speaker, who was engaged in a salary dispute with the Red Sox. All three would ultimately become key players in bringing a championship to Cleveland.

Speaker took over the reins as player-manager in 1919, and would lead the team to a championship in 1920. On August 16, the Indians were playing the Yankees at the Polo Grounds in New York. Shortstop Ray Chapman, who often crowded the plate, was batting against Carl Mays, who had an unusual underhand delivery. It was also late in the afternoon and the infield would have been in shadow with the center field area (the batters' background) bathed in sunlight. As well, at the time, "part of every pitcher's job was to dirty up a new ball the moment it was thrown onto the field. By turns, they smeared it with dirt, licorice, tobacco juice; it was deliberately scuffed, sandpapered, scarred, cut, even spiked. The result was a misshapen, earth-colored ball that traveled through the air erratically, tended to soften in the later innings, and as it came over the plate, was very hard to see."

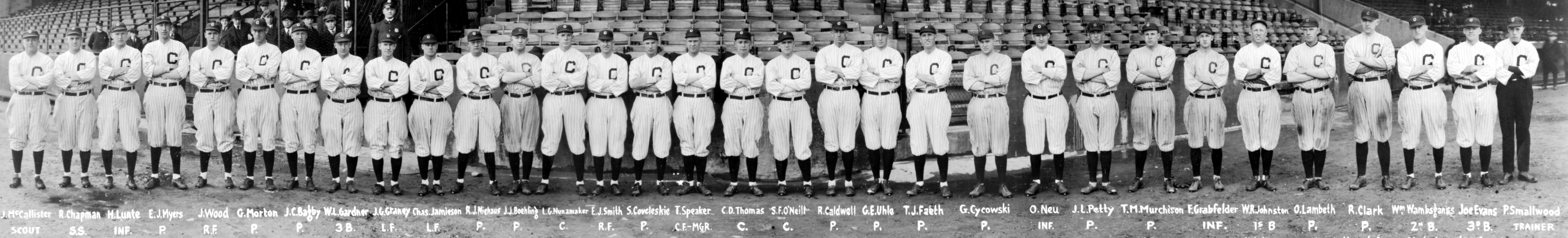
1920 World Series Champs

In any case, Chapman did not move reflexively when Mays' pitch came his way. The pitch hit Chapman in the head, fracturing his skull. Chapman died the next day, becoming the only player to sustain a fatal injury from a pitched ball. The Indians, who at the time were locked in a tight three-way pennant race with the Yankees and White Sox, were not slowed down by the death of their teammate. Rookie Joe Sewell hit .329 after replacing Chapman in the lineup.

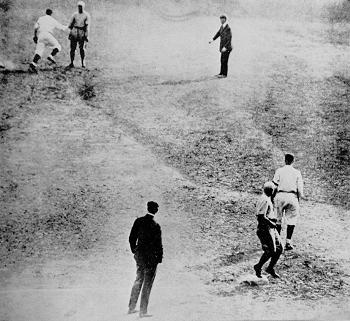
Game 5 of the 1920 World Series at League Park, with Bill Wambsganss tagging out Otto Miller for the final out of Wambsganss' historic unassisted triple play

In September 1920, the Black Sox Scandal came to a boil. With just a few games left in the season, and Cleveland and Chicago neck-and-neck for first place at 94–54 and 95–56 respectively, the Chicago owner suspended eight players. The White Sox lost 2 of 3 in their final series, while Cleveland won 4 and lost 2 in their final two series. Cleveland finished 2 games ahead of Chicago and 3 games ahead of the Yankees to win its first pennant, led by Speaker's .388 hitting, Jim Bagby's 30 victories, and solid performances from Steve O'Neill and Stan Coveleski. Cleveland went on to defeat the Brooklyn Robins 5–2 in the World Series for their first title, winning four games in a row after the Robins took a 2–1 Series lead. The Series included three memorable "firsts", all of them in Game 5 at Cleveland, and all by the home team. In the first inning, right fielder Elmer Smith hit the first Series grand slam. In the fourth inning, Jim Bagby hit the first Series home run by a pitcher. And in the top of the fifth inning, second baseman Bill Wambsganss executed the first (and only, so far) unassisted triple play in World Series history, in fact the only Series triple play of any kind.

The team would not reach the heights of 1920 again for 28 years. Speaker and Coveleski were aging and the Yankees were rising with a new weapon: Babe Ruth and the home run. They managed two second-place finishes but spent much of the decade in the cellar. In winter of 1922, Dunn contracted influenza, which lingered for months, and eventually died at his home in Chicago on June 9. Accordingly, control of the team passed to his widow, Edith Dunn, and his estate; making Mrs. Dunn among the first women to own a major league baseball team. However, Mrs. Dunn had no interest in running the team, leaving the decision-making to Ernest Barnard, who served as general manager since 1903.

=== 1927 to 1946: The Bradley Years to WWII ===
In 1927, Edith, by then known as Mrs. George Pross, sold the team to a syndicate headed by Alva Bradley for $1 million. The Bradley group brought stability to a team that had a caretaker (Barnard) running it for five years. Bradley was a well-established businessman from a prominent Cleveland family, was president of the Cleveland Chamber of Commerce, the chairman of the Cleveland Builders Supply Company, and an avid baseball fan. Other members of the ownership group included his brother, Charles Bradley, with whom he invested $175,000, banker John Sherwin Sr. ($300,000), Percy Morgan ($200,000), former Cleveland mayor and U.S. Secretary of War Newton D. Baker ($25,000), along with this law partner attorney Joseph C. Hostetler ($25,000; and would later be legal counsel for the American League), and the railroad magnates Van Sweringen brothers ($250,000). While Bradley was the team's president, he was not the majority shareholder.

The Indians were a middling team by the 1930s, finishing third or fourth most years. However, ownership began to wobble during the Great Depression. The Van Swearingens, or the "Vans" as they were commonly known, ran into incredible financial difficulty and were forced to liquidate assets to cover loans. In 1932, the Vans sold their original $250,000 investment (which was 25% of the team) for $125,000 to Alva Bradley, E.G. Crawford, I.F. Freiberger, and W.G. Bernet. Morgan also sold his original $200,000 investment (which was 20% of the team) to George Martin and George Tomlinson for an undisclosed sum. The Vans died essentially penniless in 1934 and 1936. 1936 brought Cleveland a 17-year-old pitcher, Bob Feller, who came from Van Meter, Iowa, with a powerful fastball. That season, Feller set a record with 17 strikeouts in a single game and went on to lead the league in strikeouts from 1938 to 1941. After the 1937 season, Secretary Baker also died. Indians catchers Hank Helf and Frank Pytlak set the "all-time altitude mark" on August 20, 1938, by catching baseballs dropped from the 708-foot (216 m) Terminal Tower.

By 1940, Feller, along with Ken Keltner, Mel Harder and Lou Boudreau led the Indians to within one game of the pennant. However, the team was wracked with dissension, with some players going so far as to request that Bradley fire manager Ossie Vitt. Reporters lampooned them as the Cleveland Crybabies. Feller, who had pitched a no-hitter to open the season and won 27 games, lost the final game of the season to unknown pitcher Floyd Giebell of the Detroit Tigers. The Tigers won the pennant and Giebell never won another major league game.

Cleveland entered 1941 with a young team and a new manager; Roger Peckinpaugh had replaced the despised Vitt; but the team regressed, finishing in fourth. Cleveland would soon be depleted of two stars. Hal Trosky retired in 1941 due to migraine headaches and Bob Feller enlisted in the U.S. Navy two days after the attack on Pearl Harbor. Starting third baseman Ken Keltner and outfielder Ray Mack were both drafted in 1945 taking two more starters out of the lineup.

== 1947–1959: The Post-War Powerhouse ==
In 1946 Bill Veeck formed an investment group that purchased the Cleveland Indians from Bradley's group for a reported $1.6 million. The group had more than a dozen investors, most notably celebrity Bob Hope, who grew up in Cleveland, and former Tigers slugger, Hank Greenberg. He was the last owner to purchase a baseball franchise without an independent fortune, and is responsible for many innovations and contributions to baseball.

A former owner of a minor league franchise in Milwaukee, Veeck brought a gift for promotion to Cleveland. At one point, Veeck hired rubber-faced Max Patkin, the "Clown Prince of Baseball", as a coach. Patkin's appearance in the coaching box was the sort of promotional stunt that delighted fans but infuriated the American League front office. Under Veeck's leadership, one of Cleveland's most significant achievements was breaking the color barrier in the American League by signing Larry Doby, formerly a player for the Negro league's Newark Eagles in 1947, eleven weeks after Jackie Robinson signed with the Dodgers. Similar to Robinson, Doby battled racism on and off the field but posted a .301 batting average in 1948, his first full season. A power-hitting center fielder, Doby led the American League twice in homers and was eventually elected to the Hall of Fame.

Recognizing that he had acquired a solid team, Veeck soon abandoned the aging, small and lightless League Park to take up full-time residence in massive Cleveland Municipal Stadium. Prior to 1947 the Indians played most of their games at League Park, and occasionally played weekend games at Cleveland Municipal Stadium. League Park was demolished in 1951, although a portion of the original ticket booth remains.

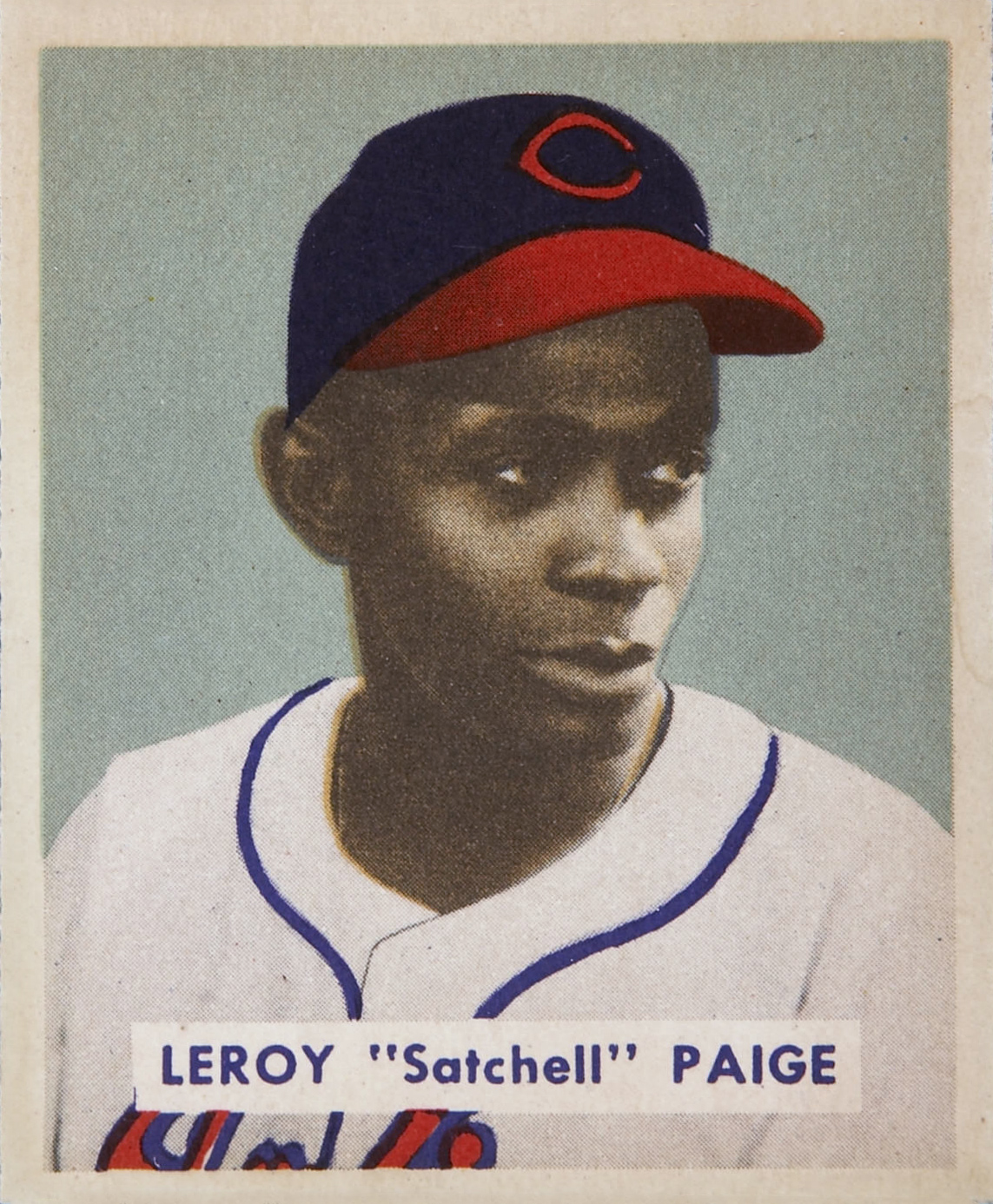
Hall of Famer Satchell Paige was the oldest Major League rookie at 42, after being signed by the Indians from the Negro leagues in 1948.

Making the most of the cavernous stadium, Veeck had a portable center field fence installed, which he could move in or out depending on how the distance favored the Indians against their opponents in a given series. The fence moved as much as 15 feet (5 m) between series opponents. Following the 1947 season, the American League countered with a rule change that fixed the distance of an outfield wall for the duration of a season. The massive stadium did, however, permit the Indians to set the then record for the largest crowd to see a Major League baseball game. On October 10, 1948, Game 5 of the World Series against the Boston Braves drew over 84,000. The record stood until the Los Angeles Dodgers drew a crowd in excess of 92,500 to watch Game 5 of the 1959 World Series at the Los Angeles Memorial Coliseum against the Chicago White Sox.

In 1948, needing pitching for the stretch run of the pennant race, Veeck turned to the Negro leagues again and signed pitching great Satchel Paige amid much controversy. Barred from Major League Baseball during his prime, Veeck's signing of the aging star in 1948 was viewed by many as another publicity stunt. At an official age of 42, Paige became the oldest rookie in Major League baseball history and the first black pitcher. Paige ended the year with a 6–1 record with a 2.48 ERA, 45 strikeouts and two shutouts.

Veterans Boudreau, Keltner, and Joe Gordon had career offensive seasons, while newcomers Larry Doby and Gene Bearden also had standout seasons. The team went down to the wire with the Boston Red Sox, winning a one-game playoff, the first in American League history, to go to the World Series. In the series, the Indians defeated the Boston Braves four games to two for their first championship in 28 years. Boudreau won the American League MVP Award. Greenberg also consolidated ownership group during 1948, buying 67% from the syndicate for an undisclosed sum.

The following year, the Indians would appear in a film the following year titled The Kid From Cleveland, in which Veeck had an interest. The film portrayed the team helping out a "troubled teenaged fan" and featured many members of the Indians organization. However, filming during the season cost the players valuable rest days leading to fatigue towards the end of the season. That season, Cleveland again contended before falling to third place. On September 23, 1949, Bill Veeck and the Indians buried their 1948 pennant in center field the day after they were mathematically eliminated from the pennant race.

Later in 1949, Veeck's first wife (who was entitled to half of Veeck's share of the team) divorced him. With most of his money tied up in the Indians, Veeck was forced to sell the team to a syndicate headed by insurance magnate Ellis Ryan for $2.5 million. In 1950, Hank Greenberg became general manager. Ryan was forced out in 1953 in favor of Myron "Mike" Wilson. Despite this turnover in the ownership, a powerhouse team composed of Feller, Doby, Minnie Miñoso, Luke Easter, Bobby Ávila, Al Rosen, Early Wynn, Bob Lemon, and Mike Garcia continued to contend through the early 1950s. However, Cleveland only won a single pennant in the decade, finishing second to the New York Yankees five times.

The winningest season in franchise history came in 1954, when the Indians finished the season with a record of 111–43 (.721). That mark set an American League record for wins which stood for 44 years until the Yankees won 114 games in 1998 (a 162-game regular season). The Indians 1954 winning percentage of .721 is still an American League record. The Indians returned to the World Series to face the New York Giants. The team could not bring home the title, however, ultimately being upset by the Giants in a sweep. The series was notable for Willie Mays' over-the-shoulder catch off the bat of Vic Wertz in Game 1.

In 1956, Mike Wilson sold the team for $3.96 million to a three-man group led by William Daley, oil tycoon Ignatius Aloysius "Nashe" O’Shaughnessy, and the return of Hank Greenberg. However, despite Daley taking control of the Indians and became chairman of the board, Wilson stayed on as the team's president. However, general manager Hank Greenberg, who was also owned 19% of the team, was unceremoniously fired in October 1957 (Greenberg abstained from the vote, and would soon sell his stake) after it was revealed that he was the mastermind behind a potential move of the club to Minneapolis.

=== Frank Lane becomes general manager ===
The Indians hired general manager Frank Lane, known as "Trader" Lane, away from the St. Louis Cardinals in 1957. Over the years, Lane had gained a reputation as a GM who loved to make deals. With the White Sox, Lane had made over 100 trades involving over 400 players in seven years. In a short stint in St. Louis, he traded away Red Schoendienst and Harvey Haddix. Lane summed up his philosophy when he said that the only deals he regretted were the ones that he did not make.

One of Lane's early trades in Cleveland sent Roger Maris to the Kansas City Athletics in the middle of 1958. Indians executive Hank Greenberg was not happy about the trade and neither was Maris, who said that he could not stand Lane. After Maris broke Babe Ruth's home run record, Lane defended himself by saying he still would have done the deal because Maris was unknown and he received good ballplayers in exchange.

After the Maris trade, Lane acquired 25-year-old Norm Cash from the White Sox for Minnie Miñoso in December 1959 and traded him to Detroit before he ever played a game for the Indians, one week before the start of the 1960 season (Cash went on to hit nearly 375 home runs for the Tigers). The Indians received Steve Demeter in the deal, who would have only five at-bats for Cleveland.

== 1960–1993: The 30-year slump ==
From 1960 to 1993, the Indians managed one third-place finish (in 1968) and six fourth-place finishes (in 1960, 1974, 1975, 1976, 1990, and 1992) but spent the rest of the time at or near the bottom of the standings.

=== Curse of Rocky Colavito ===
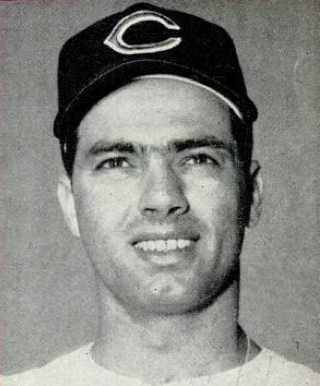
Rocky Colavito in 1959

In 1960, Lane made the trade that would define his tenure in Cleveland when he dealt slugging right fielder and fan favorite Rocky Colavito to the Detroit Tigers for Harvey Kuenn just before Opening Day in 1960. It was a blockbuster trade that swapped the 1959 AL home run co-champion (Colavito) for the AL batting champion (Kuenn). After the trade, however, Colavito hit over 30 home runs four times and made three All-Star teams for Detroit and Kansas City before returning to Cleveland in 1965. Kuenn, on the other hand, would play only one season for the Indians before departing for San Francisco in a trade for an aging Johnny Antonelli and Willie Kirkland. Akron Beacon Journal columnist Terry Pluto documented the decades of woe that followed the trade in his book The Curse of Rocky Colavito. Despite being attached to the curse, Colavito said that he never placed a curse on the Indians but that the trade was prompted by a salary dispute with Lane.

Lane also engineered an unprecedented trade of managers in mid-season 1960, sending Joe Gordon to the Tigers in exchange for Jimmy Dykes. Lane left the team in 1961, but ill-advised trades continued under new GM Gabe Paul, who had previously been the GM in Cincinnati. In 1965, the Paul traded pitcher Tommy John, who went on to win 288 games in his career, and 1966 Rookie of the Year Tommy Agee to the White Sox to get Colavito back.

=== Ownership transitions ===
Constant ownership and management changes did not help the Indians. Team President Mike Wilson died in 1962 at age 74, and Daley succeeded him. Two months later, general manager Gabe Paul bought enough stock to become the team's largest single shareholder. Although some sources report that he succeeded Daley as principal owner, Daley remained chairman, and brought in a number of additional investors who reckoned him as head of the franchise. While Paul held 20 percent of the stock and two associates held five percent each, Daley and a group of Cleveland businessmen held 70 percent of the team between them. In 1966, Daley and Paul sold controlling interest to one member of that bloc, Vernon Stouffer of the Stouffer Corporation empire. As part of the deal, Paul stayed on as general manager.

Prior to Stouffer's purchase, poor attendance had led to talk that the team would have to move elsewhere. However, the presence of a wealthy owner with strong Cleveland roots seemed to be what the franchise needed to get back into contention, and to do so in Cleveland. Unfortunately, Stouffer's finances took a severe hit when the stock of Litton Industries, who had bought Stouffer's in 1967, plummeted. Consequently, the team was cash-poor, forcing Stouffer to severely cut the team's player development budget severely over the vigorous objections of Paul and farm director Hank Peters. By nearly all accounts, this hampered the Indians for several years to come.

In order to solve some financial problems, Stouffer had made an agreement to play a minimum of 30 home games in New Orleans with a view to a possible move there. After rejecting an offer from George Steinbrenner and former Indian Al Rosen, Stouffer sold the team in 1972 to a group led by Nick Mileti, founder of the Cleveland Cavaliers and owner of the Cleveland Barons. Stouffer said his tenure as owner of the Indians was the longest five years of his life.

=== 1969 Move to the East Division ===
Lou Piniella, the 1969 Rookie of the Year and Luis Tiant, who was selected to two All-Star Games after leaving, both left. At one point, Cleveland even traded Harry Chiti to the New York Mets, only to receive him back as the player to be named later after 15 days. The 1970s were little better, with the Indians trading away several future stars, including Graig Nettles, Dennis Eckersley, Buddy Bell and 1971 Rookie of the Year Chris Chambliss, for a number of players who made no impact.

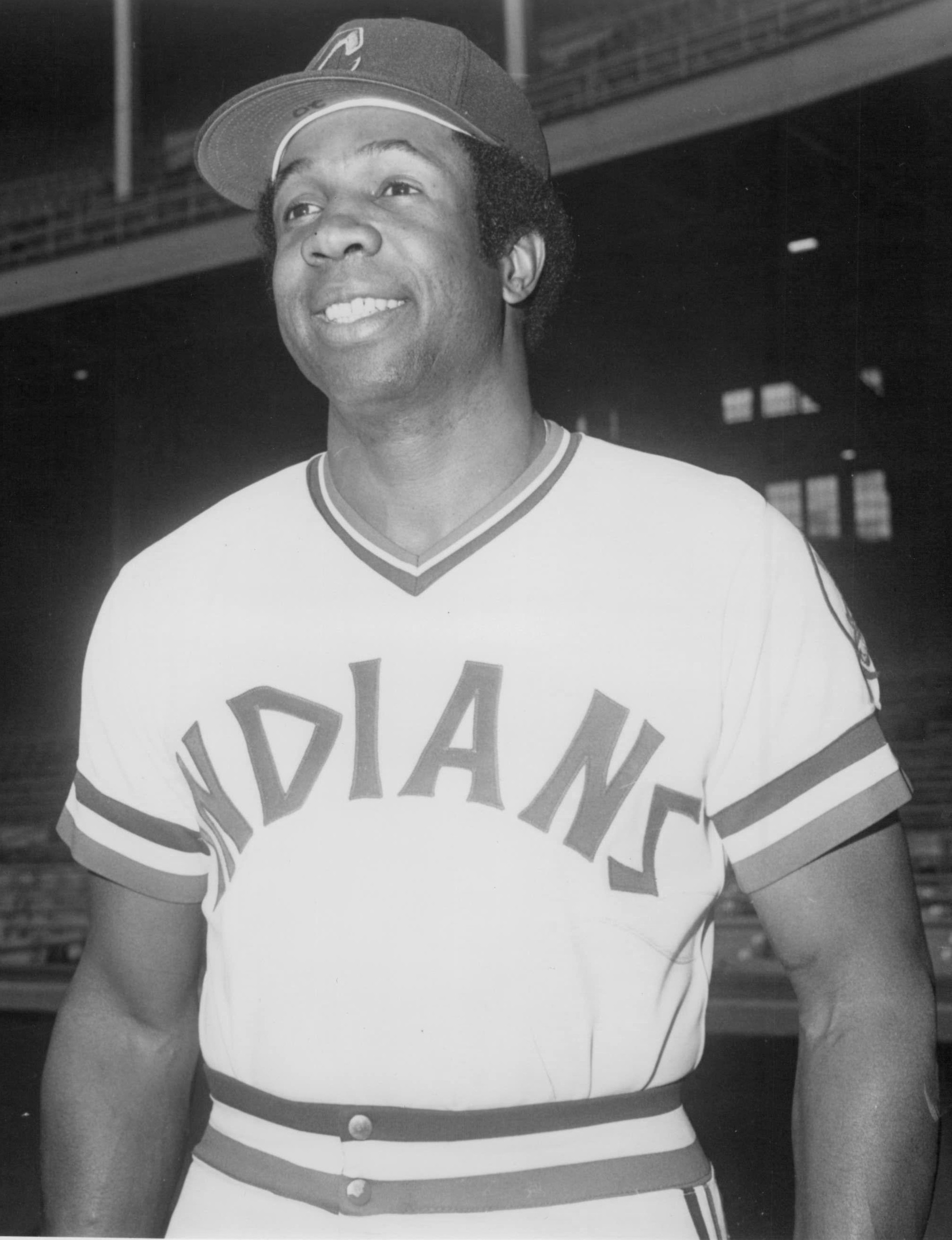
Hall of Famer Frank Robinson in 1976

In January 1973, Paul sold his remaining 7% interest in the Indians for $500,000 to become part of Steinbrenner's Cleveland-based syndicate that purchased the Yankees from CBS and team president. With Paul's departure, Phil Seghi was promoted to general manager. Several months later, it was obvious the 41-year-old Mileti had bitten off more than he could chew; Mileti publicly stepped aside as the team's chief operating officer because of "other pressing business commitments" and the ownership structure was change to a limited partnership from a corporation (primarily to save on taxes). MLB, which had to approve the transition, initially blocked the move. It was later approved in May 1973 at a league meeting after much wrangling and accusations that the Indians were "undercapitalized". Accordingly, minority owner Alva T. "Ted" Bonda assumed control of day-to-day operations with the title of executive vice president.

The team was unable to move out of the cellar, with losing seasons between 1969 and 1975. One highlight was the acquisition of Gaylord Perry in 1972. The Indians traded fireballer "Sudden Sam" McDowell for Perry, who became the first Indian pitcher to win the Cy Young Award. In 1975, Cleveland broke another color barrier with the hiring of Frank Robinson as Major League Baseball's first African American manager; another move by Bonda that further strained relations with Mileti. Robinson served as player-manager and would provide a franchise highlight when he hit a pinch hit home run on Opening Day. But the high-profile signing of Wayne Garland, a 20-game winner in Baltimore, proved to be a disaster after Garland suffered from shoulder problems and went 28–48 over five years. The team failed to improve with Robinson as manager.

The 1970s also featured the infamous Ten Cent Beer Night at Cleveland Municipal Stadium. The ill-conceived promotion at a 1974 game against the Texas Rangers ended in a riot by fans and a forfeit by the Indians.

In 1977, 22-year old pitcher Dennis Eckersley threw a no-hitter against the California Angels on May 30, on his way to an all-star appearance. However, Robinson was fired after a 26–31 start, and replaced by former Dodgers catcher Jeff Torborg. Also in 1977, Mileti's group sold the team for $11 million to a syndicate headed by trucking magnate Francis J. "Steve" O'Neill and including former general manager and owner Gabe Paul, who sold his interest in the Yankees.

The next season, near the end of spring training, Eckersley was dealt to the Boston Red Sox where he won 20 games in 1978 and another 17 in 1979. Instead the Tribe would lose 90 games in 1978. Torborg's 1979 team struggled, with a 43–52 record, which cost him his job just after the all-star break. In July, Dave Garcia took the helm as manager, as the team finished out the season 38–28.

The new decade of the 1980s brought some bright spots. In May 1981, Len Barker threw a perfect game against the Toronto Blue Jays, joining Addie Joss as the only other Indian pitcher to do so. "Super Joe" Charbonneau won the American League Rookie of the Year award. Unfortunately, Charboneau was out of baseball by 1983 after falling victim to back injuries and Barker, who was also hampered by injuries, never became a consistently dominant starting pitcher. Eventually, the Indians traded Barker to the Atlanta Braves for Brett Butler and Brook Jacoby, who would become mainstays of the team for the remainder of the decade. Butler and Jacoby were joined by Joe Carter, Mel Hall, Julio Franco and Cory Snyder, which brought new hope to fans in the late 1980s.

The team was award the 1981 All-Star Game, but even that was marred. The game was scheduled to be played on July 14, but was cancelled due to the players' strike lasting from June 12 to July 31. The game was held on August 9, as a prelude to regular season play resuming on August 10. The National League beat the American League 5–4 in front of 72,086 people in attendance at Cleveland Stadium, which broke the stadium's own record of 69,751 set in 1954, setting the still-standing record for the highest attendance in an All Star Game. It was Cleveland Stadium's fourth All-Star Game, which is a record for hosting the midsummer classic. It was just the second All-Star Game to be played outside of the month of July (the other being the second 1959 game).

O'Neill's death in 1983 led to the team going on the market once more. His son, Patrick O'Neill, did not find a buyer until real estate magnates Richard and David Jacobs purchased the team in 1986. After a rare winning season in 1986, Sports Illustrated, with Carter and Snyder pictured on the cover, boldly predicted the Indians to win the American League East in 1987. Instead, the team went on to lose 101 games and finish with the worst record in baseball, a fate attributed to the Sports Illustrated cover jinx.

Cleveland's struggles over the 30-year span were highlighted in the 1989 film Major League, which comically depicted a hapless Cleveland ball club going from worst to first by the end of the film.

=== Organizational turnaround ===
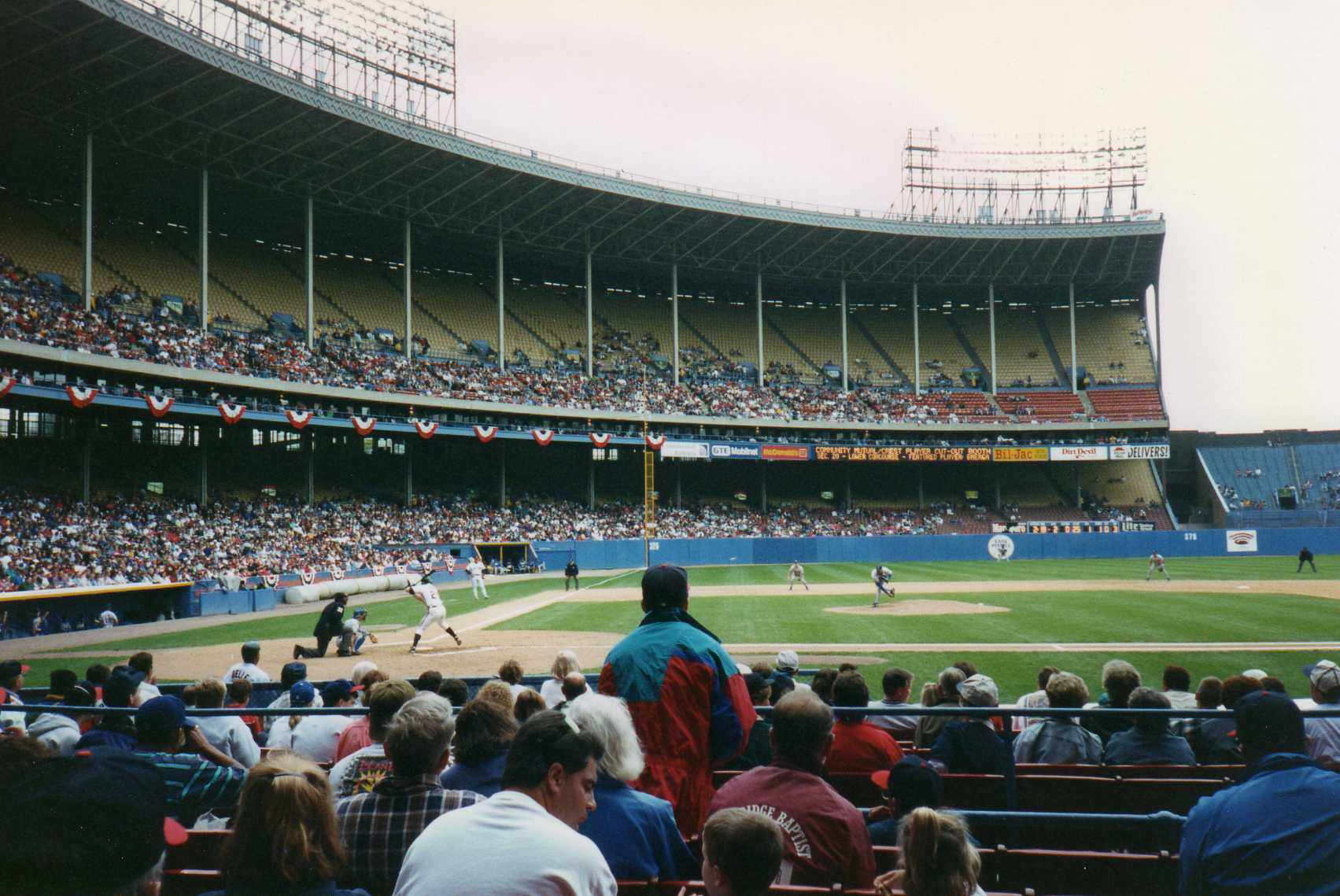
The Indians playing host to the Milwaukee Brewers at Cleveland Municipal Stadium during a 1993 home game

Throughout the 1980s, Indians owners had pushed for a new stadium. Cleveland Stadium had been a symbol of the Indians' glory years in the 1940s and 1950s. However, during the lean years even crowds of 40,000 were swallowed up by the cavernous environment. The old stadium was not aging gracefully; chunks of concrete were falling off in sections and the old wooden pilings now petrified. In 1984, a proposal for a $150 million domed stadium was defeated in a referendum 2–1.

Finally, in May 1990, Cuyahoga County voters passed an excise tax on sales of alcohol and cigarettes in the county. The tax proceeds would be used to finance the building of the Gateway Sports and Entertainment Complex which would include Jacobs Field and Gund Arena for the Cleveland Cavaliers basketball team. The team had new ownership and a new stadium on the way. They now needed a winning team.

The team's fortunes started to turn in 1989, ironically with a very unpopular trade. The team sent power-hitting outfielder Joe Carter to the San Diego Padres for two unproven players, Sandy Alomar Jr. and Carlos Baerga. Alomar made an immediate impact, not only being elected to the All-Star team but also winning Cleveland's fourth Rookie of the Year award and a Gold Glove. Baerga would become a three-time All-Star with consistent offensive production.

Indians general manager John Hart made a number of moves that would finally bring success to the team. In 1991, he hired former Indian Mike Hargrove to manage and traded catcher Eddie Taubensee to the Houston Astros who, with a surplus of outfielders, were willing to part with Kenny Lofton. Lofton finished second in AL Rookie of the Year balloting with a .285 average and 66 stolen bases.

The Indians were named "Organization of the Year" by Baseball America in 1992, in response to the appearance of offensive bright spots and an improving farm system.

The team suffered a tragedy during spring training of 1993, when a boat carrying pitchers Steve Olin, Tim Crews, and Bob Ojeda crashed into a pier. Olin and Crews were killed, and Ojeda was seriously injured. (Ojeda missed most of the season, and would retire the following year).

By the end of the 1993 season, the team was in transition, leaving Cleveland Stadium and fielding a talented nucleus of young players. Many of those players came from the Indians' new AAA farm team, the Charlotte Knights, who won the International League title that year.

== 1994–2000: Central Division is created ==
=== New beginning ===
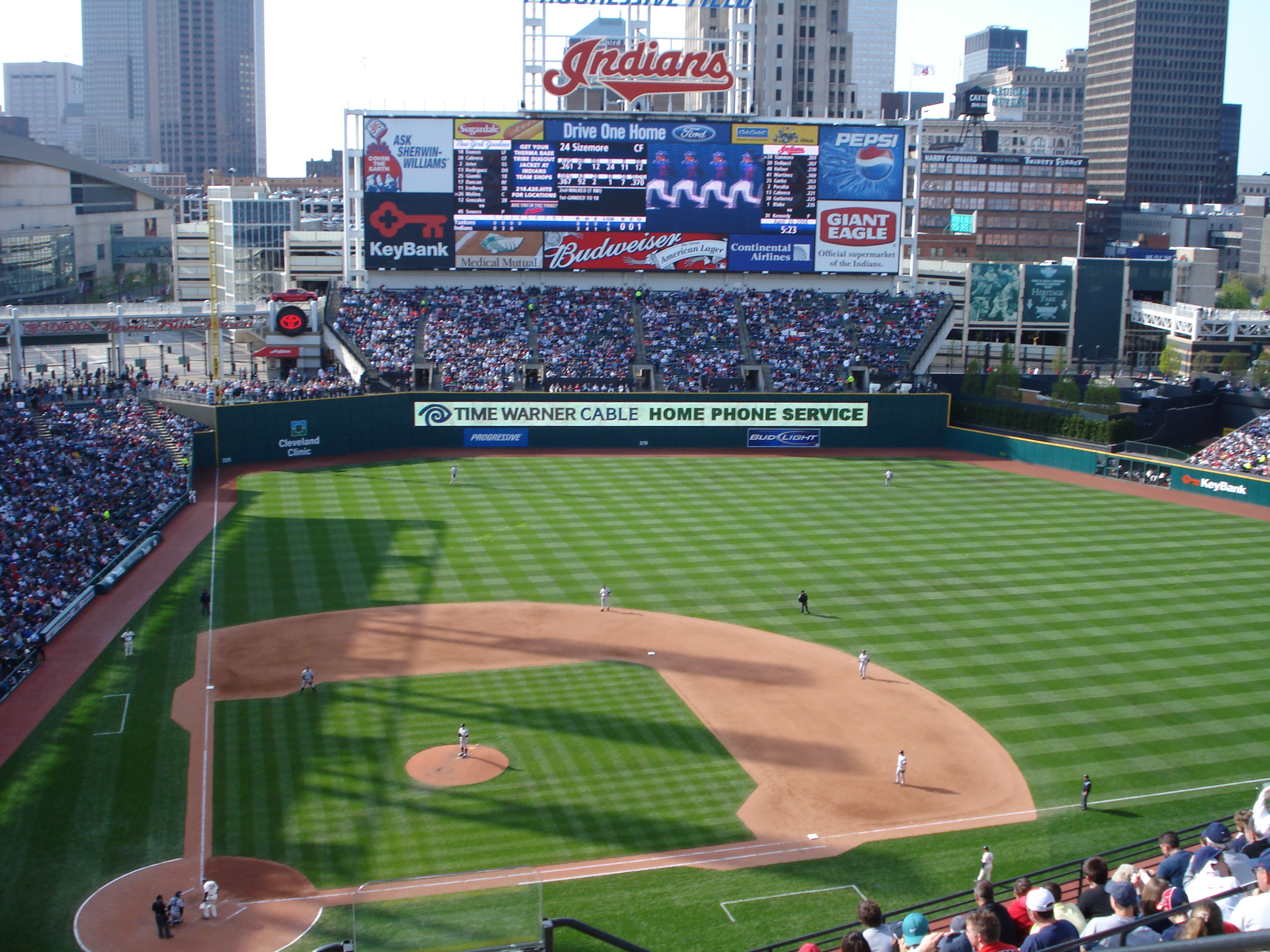
Progressive Field

Indians General Manager John Hart and team owner Richard Jacobs managed to turn the team's fortunes around. The Indians opened Jacobs Field in 1994 with the aim of improving on the prior season's sixth-place finish. The Indians were only one game behind the division-leading Chicago White Sox on August 12 when a players strike wiped out the rest of the season. The strike also led to an absurdity: The Minnesota Twins traded Dave Winfield to the Cleveland Indians at the trade waiver deadline on August 31 for a "player to be named later". The 1994 season had been halted two weeks earlier (it was eventually canceled a month later on September 14), so Winfield did not get to play for the Indians that year and no player was ever named in exchange. To settle the trade, Cleveland and Minnesota executives went to dinner, with the Indians picking up the tab. This makes Winfield the only player in major league history to be traded for a dinner.

=== 1995 season: first since 1954 ===
Having contended for the division in the aborted 1994 season, Cleveland sprinted to a 100–44 record (18 games were lost to player/owner negotiations) in 1995 winning its first ever divisional title. Veterans Dennis Martínez, Orel Hershiser and Eddie Murray combined with a young core of players including Albert Belle, Jim Thome, Manny Ramírez and Charles Nagy to lead the league in team batting average as well as team ERA.

After defeating the Boston Red Sox in the Division Series and the Seattle Mariners in the ALCS, Cleveland clinched a World Series berth, for the first time since 1954. The World Series ended in disappointment with the Indians falling in six games to the Atlanta Braves. The Indians repeated as AL Central champions in 1996, but lost to the Baltimore Orioles in the Division Series. Notably in 1996, tickets for every home game for the Indians sold out before opening day.

=== 1997 season: two outs away... ===
In 1997 Cleveland started slow but finished with an 86–75 record. Taking their third consecutive AL Central title, the Indians defeated the heavily favored New York Yankees in the Division Series, 3–2. After defeating the Baltimore Orioles in the ALCS, Cleveland went on to face the Florida Marlins in the World Series which featured the coldest game in World Series history. With the series tied after game six, the Indians went into the ninth inning of Game 7 with a 2–1 lead, but closer José Mesa allowed the Marlins to tie the game. In the eleventh inning, Édgar Rentería drove in the winning run giving the Marlins their first championship.

Cleveland became the first team to lose the World Series after carrying the lead into the bottom of the ninth inning of the seventh game. In his 2002 autobiography, Indians shortstop Omar Vizquel blamed José Mesa for the loss, which led to a feud between the players.

=== 1998–2001 ===
In 1998, the Indians made the playoffs for the fourth straight year. After defeating the wild-card Boston Red Sox three games to one in the first round of the playoffs, Cleveland lost the 1998 ALCS in six games to the New York Yankees, who had come into the playoffs with 114 wins in the regular season.

For the 1999 season, Cleveland added relief pitcher Ricardo Rincón and Roberto Alomar, brother of catcher Sandy Alomar, and won the Central Division title for its fifth consecutive playoff appearance. The team scored 1,009 runs, becoming the first (and to date only) team since the 1950 Boston Red Sox to score more than 1,000 runs in a season. This time, Cleveland did not make it past the first round, losing the Division Series to the Red Sox, despite taking a two-games-to-none lead in the series. In game three, Indians starter Dave Burba went down with an injury in the 4th inning. Four pitchers, including presumed game four starter Jaret Wright, surrendered nine runs in relief. Without a long reliever or emergency starter on the playoff roster, Hargrove started both Bartolo Colón and Charles Nagy in games four and five on only three days rest. The Indians lost game four 23–7 and game five 12–8. Four days later, Hargrove was dismissed as manager.

In 2000, the Indians had a 44–42 start, but caught fire after the All Star break and went 46–30 the rest of the way to finish 90–72. The team had one of the league's best offenses that year and a defense that yielded three gold gloves. However, they ended up five games behind the Chicago White Sox in the Central division and missed the wild card by one game to the Seattle Mariners. Mid-season trades brought Bob Wickman and Jake Westbrook to Cleveland, and free agent Manny Ramírez departed for Boston after the season.

The Indians set a Major League record for most pitchers used in a single season. Colon, Burba, and Chuck Finley posted strong seasons, and the bullpen was solid. But with Jaret Wright and Charles Nagy spending months on the disabled list, the team could not solidify the final two spots in the rotation. Other starting pitchers that season combined for a total of 346 2/3 innings and 265 earned runs for an ERA of 6.88.

In 2000, Larry Dolan bought the Indians for $320 million from Richard Jacobs, who, along with his late brother David, had paid $45 million for the club in 1986. The sale set a record at the time for the sale of a baseball franchise.

2001 saw a return to the playoffs. After the departures of Manny Ramírez and Sandy Alomar Jr., the Indians signed Ellis Burks and former MVP Juan González, who helped the Indians win the Central division with a 91–71 record. On June 2 Jacob Cruz was traded for Jody Gerut and Josh Bard.

One of the highlights came on August 5, 2001, when the Indians completed the biggest comeback in MLB History. Cleveland rallied to close a 14–2 deficit in the sixth inning to defeat the Seattle Mariners 15–14 in 11 innings. The Mariners, who won a record 116 games that season, had a strong bullpen, and Indians manager Charlie Manuel had already pulled many of his starters with the game seemingly out of reach.

Seattle and Cleveland met in the first round of the playoffs, with the Indians taking a two-games-to-one lead. However, with Freddy Garcia, Jamie Moyer and a strong bullpen, the Mariners won Games 4 and 5 to deny the Indians their first playoff series victory since 1998. In the 2001 offseason, GM John Hart resigned and his assistant Mark Shapiro took the reins.

== 2002–2010: Shapiro years ==
=== First "rebuilding of the team" ===
Shapiro moved to rebuild by dealing aging veterans for younger talent. He traded Roberto Alomar to the New York Mets for a package that included outfielder Matt Lawton and prospects Alex Escobar and Billy Traber. When the team fell out of contention in mid-2002, Shapiro fired manager Charlie Manuel and traded pitching ace Bartolo Colón for prospects Brandon Phillips, Cliff Lee, and Grady Sizemore; acquired Travis Hafner from the Rangers for Ryan Drese and Einar Díaz; and picked up Coco Crisp from the St. Louis Cardinals for aging starter Chuck Finley. Jim Thome left after the season, going to the Phillies for a larger contract.

Young Indians teams finished far out of contention in 2002 and 2003 under new manager Eric Wedge. They posted strong offensive numbers in 2004, but continued to struggle with a bullpen that blew more than 20 saves. A highlight of the season was a 22–0 victory over the New York Yankees on August 31, one of the worst defeats suffered by the Yankees in team history.

In early 2005, the offense got off to a poor start. After a brief July slump, the Indians caught fire in August, and cut a 15.5 game deficit in the Central Division down to 1.5 games. However, the season came to an end as the Indians went on to lose six of their last seven games, five of them by one run, missing the playoffs by only two games. Shapiro was named Executive of the Year in 2005.The next season, the club made several roster changes, while retaining its nucleus of young players. The off-season was highlighted by the acquisition of top prospect Andy Marte from the Boston Red Sox. The Indians had a solid offensive season, led by career years from Travis Hafner and Grady Sizemore. Hafner, despite missing the last month of the season, tied the single season grand slam record of six, which was set in 1987 by Don Mattingly. Despite the solid offensive performance, the bullpen struggled with 23 blown saves (a Major League worst), and the Indians finished a disappointing fourth.

In 2007, Shapiro signed veteran help for the bullpen and outfield in the offseason. Veterans Aaron Fultz, and Joe Borowski joined Rafael Betancourt in the Indians bullpen. Shapiro also signed right fielder Trot Nixon and left fielder David Dellucci to short-term contracts for veteran leadership. The Indians improved significantly over the prior year and went into the All-Star break in second place. The team brought back Kenny Lofton for his third stint with the team in late July. The Indians finished with a 96–66 record tied with the Red Sox for best in baseball, their seventh Central Division title in 13 years and their first post-season trip since 2001.

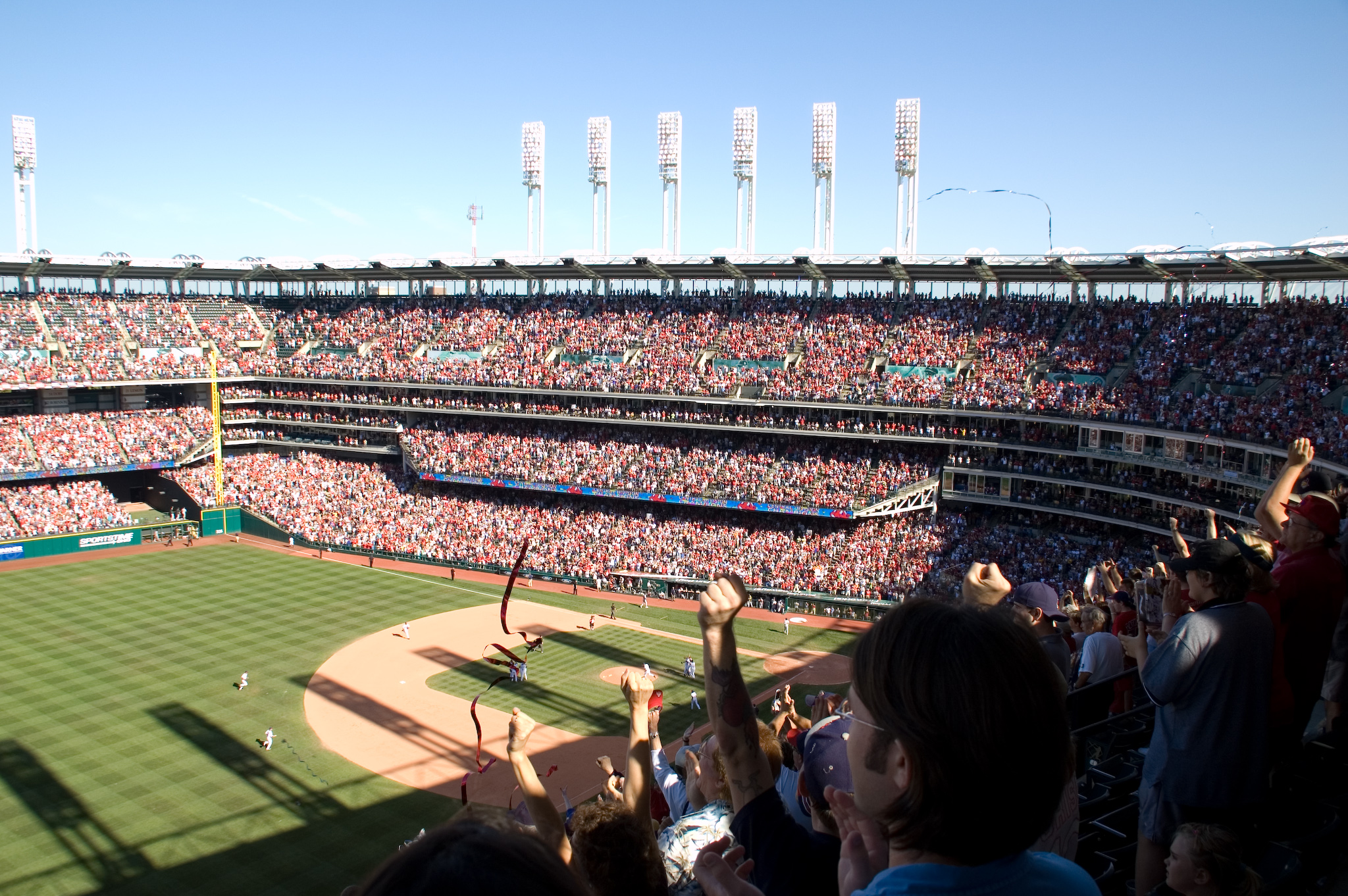
Indians fans celebrate as the team clinches the 2007 division title.

The Indians began their playoff run by defeating the New York Yankees in the American League Division Series three games to one. This series will be most remembered for the swarm of bugs that overtook the field in the later innings of game 2. They also jumped out to a three-games-to-one lead over the Red Sox in the American League Championship Series. The season ended in disappointment when Boston swept the final three games to advance to the 2007 World Series.

Despite the loss, Cleveland players took home a number of awards. Grady Sizemore, who had a .995 fielding percentage and only two errors in 405 chances, won the Gold Glove award, Cleveland's first since 2001. Indians Pitcher CC Sabathia won the second Cy Young Award in team history with a 19–7 record, a 3.21 ERA and an MLB-leading 241 innings pitched. Eric Wedge was awarded the first Manager of the Year Award in team history. Shapiro was named to his second Executive of the Year in 2007.

=== Second "rebuilding of the team" ===
The Indians struggled during the 2008 season. Injuries to sluggers Travis Hafner and Victor Martinez, as well as starting pitchers Jake Westbrook and Fausto Carmona led to a poor start. The Indians, falling to last place for a short time in June and July, traded CC Sabathia to the Milwaukee Brewers for prospects Matt LaPorta, Rob Bryson, and Michael Brantley. and traded starting third baseman Casey Blake for catching prospect Carlos Santana. However, amid the mediocrity, some key players, such as shortstop Jhonny Peralta and catcher Kelly Shoppach, who took over starting duties after Martinez was injured, began to shine. Pitcher Cliff Lee went 22–3 with an ERA of 2.54 and earned the AL Cy Young Award. Grady Sizemore had a career year, winning a Gold Glove and Silver Slugger, and the Indians finished with a record of 81–81.

Prospects for the 2009 season dimmed early when the Indians ended May with a record of 22–30. Shapiro made multiple trades: Cliff Lee and Ben Francisco to the Philadelphia Phillies for prospects Jason Knapp, Carlos Carrasco, Jason Donald and Lou Marson; Victor Martinez to the Boston Red Sox for prospects Bryan Price, Nick Hagadone and Justin Masterson; Ryan Garko to the Texas Rangers for Scott Barnes; and Kelly Shoppach to the Tampa Bay Devil Rays for Mitch Talbot. The Indians finished the season tied for last in their division, with a record of 65–97. The team announced on September 30, 2009, that Eric Wedge and all of the team's coaching staff would be released at the end of the 2009 season. Manny Acta was hired as the team's 40th manager on October 25, 2009.

On February 18, 2010, it was announced that Shapiro (following the end of the 2010 season) would be promoted to team President, with current President Paul Dolan becoming the new Chairman/CEO, and longtime Shapiro assistant Chris Antonetti filling the GM role.

== 2011–2021: GM Chris Antonetti ==
On January 18, 2011, longtime popular former first baseman and manager Mike Hargrove was brought in as a special adviser. The Indians started 2011 red-hot, going 30–15 in their first 45 games. The team remained around .500 and kept pace with the division leading Tigers through August, just 1.5 games behind them with a record of 54–51 on July 28. However, after that point, the team collapsed, going 26–31 after that period, and finished 80–82, but in second place in the AL Central, 15 games behind Detroit. Their record was the team's best since 2008 and a 15-game improvement over 2010.

The Tribe went into 2012 thinking they could contend for the Wild Card spot. They started the year well, leading the Central for most of April and May and switching places with Chicago in June. They entered the All-Star Break 44–41, just 3 games behind the White Sox for 1st place. The team looked poised for at least a winning season. The team deflated after the All-Star Game, going 9–19 immediately afterward and just 24–53 after July 10 to finish 68–94.

=== Start of the Terry Francona era ===
The Indians soon fired their manager and hired Terry Francona, who led the Boston Red Sox to the playoffs in five of his last seven seasons and two World Series titles in four years, including their first title since 1918. They also cut several minor players, including Grady Sizemore, who played only a quarter of the previous three seasons due to injury, none in 2012. All of the changes led to good hopes for 2013, and the team was up and down for most of May, but returned to winning form in June. They eventually secured a wild card berth, but lost the Wild Card Game to the Tampa Bay Rays.

In 2016, the Indians won their first AL Central title since 2007 and their first AL pennant since 1997. They faced the Chicago Cubs in the World Series that year and won three of the first four games, but relinquished the lead to the Cubs, who won their first World Series since 1908.

The Indians continued to win in 2017, winning the second-most games in franchise history and setting an American League record by winning 22 consecutive games from August 24 to September 14. They lost the ALDS to the New York Yankees after leading the series 2–0. The Indians again won the AL Central in 2018 but were swept in that year's ALDS by the Houston Astros. In 2019, the Indians won 93 games but missed the postseason, being three games behind the Tampa Bay Rays in the AL wild card race.

In the pandemic-shortened 2020 season, the Indians finished third in the AL Central and were named the number four seed in the expanded 16-team postseason. They lost the first round of the playoffs to the New York Yankees. In 2021, the team's last season under the Indians nickname, they finished second in the AL Central with an 80–82 record.

== 2022–present: Cleveland Guardians era ==
On July 23, 2021, it was announced that the Indians would change their name to the Guardians. It went into effect at the start of the 2022 season.

The Guardians clinched the AL Central in 2022, but lost the ALDS again to the Yankees.

== See also ==
- History of Cleveland
