= List of Cleveland Guardians owners and executives =

== General managers ==
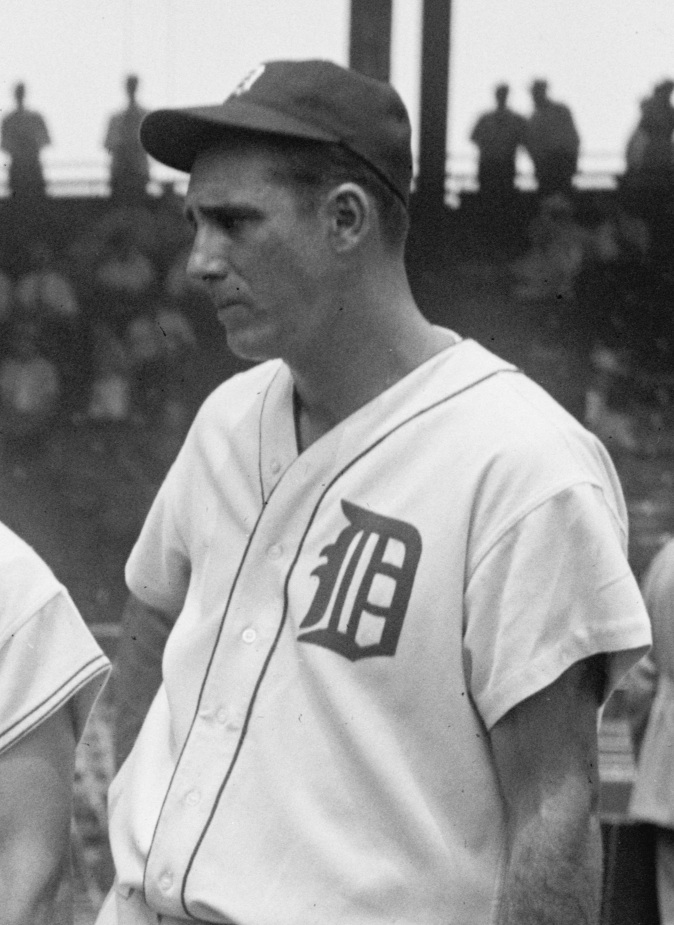
Hank Greenberg, Hall of Famer and 2-time MVP

Name	Years
Ernest Barnard	1903–1927
Bob McRoy	1916–1917
Billy Evans	1927–1935
C.C. Slapnicka	1935–1941
Roger Peckinpaugh	1941–1946
Bill Veeck	1946–1949
Hank Greenberg	1950–1957
Frank Lane	1957–1961
Gabe Paul	1961–1973
Phil Seghi	1973–1985
Joe Klein	1985–1987
Hank Peters	1987–1991
John Hart	1991–2001
Mark Shapiro	2001–2010
Chris Antonetti	2010–2015
Mike Chernoff	2015–present

== Owners ==
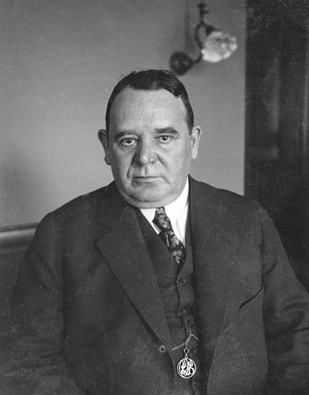
Cleveland Indians owner Jim Dunn

Name	Years
Charles W. Somers	1900–1916
Jim Dunn	1916–1922
Dunn estate	1922–1927
Alva Bradley	1927–1946
Bill Veeck	1946–1949
Ellis Ryan	1949–1952
Myron H. Wilson	1953–1956
William R. Daley	1956–1962
Gabe Paul	1963–1966
Vernon Stouffer	1967–1972
Nick Mileti	1972–1976
Ted Bonda	1977–1978
Steve O'Neill	1978–1983
O'Neill estate	1983–1986
Richard E. Jacobs	1986–2000
Larry J. Dolan	2000–2025
Paul J. Dolan	2025–present
David Blitzer (Note: 25% stake with the option to become controlling owner in 2028)	2022–present

== See also ==
- List of Cleveland Guardians managers
- Cleveland Guardians all-time roster
- Cleveland Guardians award winners and league leaders
- Cleveland Guardians team records
- Cleveland Guardians seasons
