= Steve O'Neill (disambiguation) =

Steve O'Neill (1891–1962) was an American baseball catcher.

Steve O'Neill may also refer to:

- Steve O'Neill (owner) (1899–1983), American businessman and baseball team owner
- Steve O'Neill (rugby league), English former rugby league footballer who played in the 1970s, 1980s and 1990s, and coached in the 1990s and 2000s

== See also ==
- Stephen O'Neill (born 1980), Irish footballer
- Steve O'Neal (born 1946), American football player
