= Joe Klein (baseball executive) =

American professional baseball executive

- Born: Joseph Anthony Klein III; August 22, 1942; Baltimore, Maryland, U.S.
- Died: August 23, 2017 (aged 75); Philadelphia, Pennsylvania, U.S.
- Occupation: Baseball executive

Joseph Anthony Klein III (August 22, 1942 – August 23, 2017) was an American professional baseball executive. At the time of his death, Klein was the executive director of the Atlantic League of Professional Baseball, an independent circuit operating in the Northeast United States. Klein was a farm director, scouting director, and general manager in Major League Baseball from 1976 through 1995.

== Minor league first baseman and manager ==
Born in Baltimore, Maryland, he graduated from Baltimore Polytechnic Institute. During his playing career, Klein was a minor league first baseman in the Washington Senators farm system from 1962 to 1968. A left-handed batter and thrower, he hit .278 in 1,733 at bats. After retiring from the field, he spent 16 years as a minor league manager and front office executive with the franchise, beginning in 1969 when it was still the expansion edition of the Senators, and continuing after it became the Texas Rangers in 1972.

He managed farm clubs in the Class A Western Carolinas League and Carolina League, the Double-A Eastern League (where his 1973 Pittsfield Rangers club won a division championship) and the Rookie-level Gulf Coast League between 1969 and 1978. In 1976, Klein also added the title of assistant farm system director of the Rangers, and was promoted to head of the club's farm system and then director, player procurement and development, between 1978 and 1982.

== General manager of Rangers, Indians and Tigers ==
In October 1982, he was promoted to general manager of the Rangers, who had finished next-to-last in the American League West Division that season. The Rangers improved by 13 games to finish third in the AL West in 1983, but the team regressed to only 69 wins in 1984 and Klein was fired.

He then joined the Kansas City Royals as assistant general manager for 1985, working briefly with John Schuerholz, until March 8, when he was appointed director of baseball operations and de facto GM of the Cleveland Indians less than a month before the 1985 season began. That year's edition of the Indians lost 102 games and finished last in the AL East, but, buoyed by the slugging of Joe Carter and Cory Snyder, Cleveland won 84 games in 1986—a 24-game improvement—and compiled its first winning campaign since strike-shortened 1981. The Indians were seen as a dark-horse contender for the AL East title in 1987 (making the cover of the spring training edition of Sports Illustrated), but instead they collapsed completely, losing 101 games and falling into the division basement. The front office was overhauled, and on November 18, Klein was demoted by new club president Hank Peters. He eventually rejoined the Royals, this time as vice president of player personnel, in 1990–91.

In 1992, he moved on to the Detroit Tigers, who were in a period of transition with former University of Michigan football head coach Bo Schembechler serving as the team president. Klein was hired as the Tigers' scouting director, but moved into the general manager position at the end of the 1993 season. He ran the Detroit front office for two losing seasons, 1994 and 1995, which were also the last two clubs of the Sparky Anderson era, until another front office housecleaning cost him his job.

== Atlantic League executive ==
In his later life, Klein was an important figure in independent baseball. As executive director of the Atlantic League, Klein was in charge of day-to-day baseball operations for the organization. In August 2007, he returned to the public eye when he was called upon to discipline former MLB infielder José Offerman after a bat-swinging episode in Bridgeport, Connecticut.

Klein was associated with the Atlantic League from its founding until his death on August 23, 2017, at Temple University Hospital in Philadelphia from complications from quadruple bypass surgery, only one day after his 75th birthday.

| Preceded by Eddie Robinson | Texas Rangers General Manager; 1982–1984 | Succeeded by Tom Grieve |
| Preceded by Phil Seghi | Cleveland Indians General Manager; 1986–1987 | Succeeded by Hank Peters |
| Preceded by Jerry Walker | Detroit Tigers General Manager; 1993–1995 | Succeeded by Randy Smith |
