= Phil Seghi =

American baseball executive (1909–1987)

- Born: March 9, 1909; Cedar Point, Illinois, U.S.
- Died: January 8, 1987 (aged 77); Thousand Oaks, California, U.S.
- Occupation(s): Baseball player, manager, scout and executive
- Years active: 1932–1987

Philip Dominic Seghi (March 9, 1909 – January 8, 1987) was an American front-office executive in Major League Baseball. A longtime associate of Gabe Paul, Seghi was credited with signing Pete Rose, the all-time leader in hits, when Seghi was farm system and scouting director of the Cincinnati Reds in 1960.

He was born in Cedar Point, Illinois, to an Italian immigrant family, attended Northwestern University, and was an infielder in minor league baseball during his playing career, which began in 1932 and essentially ended in 1949, with the exceptions of the wartime years of 1944–1945.

After World War II, Seghi was a manager in the lower minor leagues in 1946–1955, working in the Pittsburgh Pirates and Cleveland Indians organizations. After joining the Redlegs (as the Reds were known from 1953 to 1958) as a scout, Seghi succeeded Bill McKechnie Jr. as Cincinnati's farm director after the 1958 season. Serving under Paul and his successor, Bill DeWitt, Seghi remained with the Reds until 1968, a period during which the Reds built a player development organization that provided the foundation for the "Big Red Machine" dynasty.

In 1963, Seghi was promoted by DeWitt to assistant general manager, but a change in ownership and the arrival of Bob Howsam in 1967 as GM caused Seghi to leave Cincinnati for the Oakland Athletics at the close of that season. Led by flamboyant owner Charlie Finley and awash with young talent, the A's also were on the verge of a dynasty, winning five consecutive American League West Division titles (1971–1975) and three consecutive AL pennants and World Series titles (1972–1974). From 1968 to 1971 Seghi served as Oakland's farm and scouting director and assistant to Finley, who was his own general manager.

By 1972, however, Seghi was back working with Paul as assistant general manager of the Cleveland Indians, and succeeded Paul as the Indians' GM in 1973. His most notable achievement occurred after the 1974 season, when he and owner Nick Mileti appointed Frank Robinson (signed and developed by the Cincinnati farm system of the 1950s) as Major League Baseball's first African-American manager. Seghi would serve 13 full seasons as Cleveland's general manager, but the Indians enjoyed only three above-.500 seasons during that time (1976, 1979 and 1981).

Seghi stepped down after the 1985 campaign to become a senior player personnel adviser with Cleveland. He died of cancer in Thousand Oaks, California, on January 8, 1987, at the age of 77.

Preceded by Gabe Paul	Cleveland Indians General Manager; 1973–1985	Succeeded by Joe Klein
