= APCOA Parking =

German parking management company

- Type: Private
- Industry: Car parks
- Founded: 1949; 77 years ago, in Cleveland, Ohio, USA
- Founder: Howard Metzenbaum; Ted Bonda
- Headquarters: London, UK
- Area served: Worldwide (11 countries)
- Owner: Strategic Value Partners; (2024–present)
- Website: www.apcoa.com

APCOA Parking AG (APCOA) is Europe's longest-established full service parking management company. Headquartered in London, in United Kingdom, it manages over 1,800,000 parking spaces across 11 countries, and employs approximately 5,000 people.

On February 7, 2024, it was announced that Strategic Value Partners had completed its acquisition of the company.

== History ==
In 1949, Howard Metzenbaum and Ted Bonda founded APCOA as the Airport Parking Company of America, Inc. in Cleveland, Ohio. In 1966, the company was acquired by the ITT Corporation and was made into a division of ITT.

In 1970, APCOA Autoparking GmbH was founded in Stuttgart, under the German wing of ITT, called SEL. The company then expanded across Europe, entering Vienna, capital of Austria, in 1970; Sunbury on Thames, England, in 1981; Mantua, Italy in 1985; and Rotterdam, Netherlands, in 1989.

By the mid-1980s, most of the European in-country subsidiaries had been divested from ITT, and slowly over the next ten years the management of APCOA Autoparking GmbH began to re-integrate the group under common ownership. The US operations of APCOA were purchased from ITT Corporation through a management buyout in 1975 and eventually merged with Standard Parking in 1998.

In 1991, venture capital company CWB Capital Partners of London financed a management buyout. Also in 1991, the company won the first open local authority tender for on-street enforcement services in the City of Westminster, and provided the UK's first "whole of borough" parking solution covering car parks to local streets for Southwark Council.

The company changed its name to APCOA Holding AG in 1994, and again to APCOA Parking AG in 1995. It trades on the Frankfurt Stock Exchange, with 75% of shares held by UK registered investors. In April 1999, Salamander AG of Kornwestheim acquired 27.1% of APCOA Parking AG shares, and took complete control in October of that year. The company continued to expand through acquisition, including the parking subsidiary of UK based FirstGroup.

In 2002 EnBW-AG of Karlsruhe purchased 98.7% of Salamander AG, to virtually control APCOA Parking AG. After consolidating various partnerships to 100% ownership, the company continued its expansion into Eastern Europe, entering Rijeka, Croatia in 2003. The company was delisted from the Frankfurt Stock Exchange in 2003.

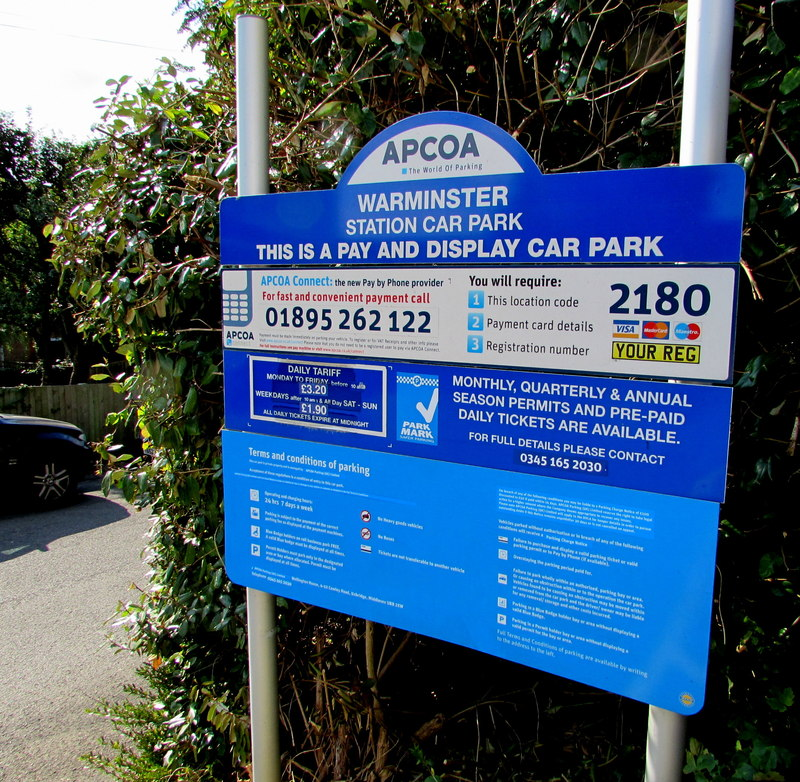
APCOA car park information board in Warminster, UK

On June 30, 2004, Investcorp acquired 98.3% of APCOA Parking AG shares from EnBW AG through its vehicle Parking Holdings GmbH for €265 million including debt. In 2005 the company entered Switzerland, and changed the name of Parking Holdings GmbH to APCOA Parking Holdings GmbH (APHG). After a bidding battle with National Car Parks owned by 3i, and Australia's Macquarie Bank; on 19 February 2007 French based investment company Eurazeo announced the proposed purchase of APCOA Parking AG for €885 million from Investcorp.

In 2009, Westminster City Council undertook a further procurement process for on-street parking services. Recognising that part of its procurement procedure did not comply with the relevant regulations, the Council abandoned its initial procurement process in order to start again. APCOA, having "committed very substantial resources" to winning the tender, challenged the abandonment decision, but the High Court in a hearing confirmed that both contractually and under procurement law, there is a right to abandon a procurement procedure.

=== 2012 restructuring process ===
APCOA tried to restructure its significant amount of debt derived from the 2007 leveraged buyout by Eurazeo from 2012 onwards. In a first step management tried to find equity investors as well as refinancing partners in order to decrease the debt pressure on the company's performance. This process was stopped a year later as the necessary partners could not be found. Already then APCOA's debt was traded actively with Centerbridge becoming the major creditor with more than 50% of debt value.

Due to the failure of the first process, management decided to restructure itself using a court supervised UK-Scheme of arrangement. With this procedure APCOA was able to overrule dissenting creditor minorities previously hindering the restructuring process.

On October 30, 2014 the High Court of Justice in London sanctioned the scheme reducing the company's debt by €440 million through a debt equity swap and introduced additional financing of €80 million. The group is now majority-owned by US and UK-based private investment firm Centerbridge, which has taken control through the debt-equity swap.

== Current operations ==
APCOA is presently the market leading provider of car parking (by number of spaces managed) in Germany (225,000 spaces), Norway (96,900), Denmark (61,900), Austria (48,100), Italy (42,400), and Poland (12,600).
