= Nick Mileti =

American lawyer (1931–2024)

- Born: Nick James Mileti; April 22, 1931; Cleveland, Ohio, U.S.
- Died: August 21, 2024 (aged 93); Rocky River, Ohio, U.S.
- Education: Bowling Green State University B.A. The Ohio State University Moritz College of Law J.D.
- Occupations: businessman, lawyer, sports franchise owner and author
- Known for: founder of Cleveland Cavaliers owner of Cleveland Indians

Nick James Mileti (April 22, 1931 – August 21, 2024) was an American author, lawyer, businessman, sports entrepreneur and sports franchise owner who was, during the 1970s, the owner of the Cleveland Indians, Cleveland Cavaliers, Cleveland Crusaders, the Cleveland Arena, the Coliseum at Richfield, and radio station "3WE" WWWE AM/1100 (now WTAM).

== Sports franchise ownership career ==
Born in southeast Cleveland, Mileti put himself through college, graduating from Bowling Green State University (BGSU) in 1953. The BGSU Alumni Center is now named in his honor. He was a member of the Theta Chi fraternity at BGSU. Following his time at BGSU, he earned a J.D. degree from the Ohio State University Moritz College of Law in 1956. After military service he opened a law practice in Lakewood, Ohio and became prosecutor there after befriending the mayor. He became involved in sports after serving as chairman of the Bowling Green alumni association and organizing a BGSU game at the Cleveland Arena. Shortly thereafter he purchased the Arena and its prime tenant, the original Cleveland Barons hockey team. Recognizing that the Arena needed another tenant, he sought an expansion NBA team for Cleveland.

Mileti spearheaded a group that purchased the ownership rights to the Cleveland Cavaliers in 1970 to enter the league as an expansion team, paying a fee of $3.7 million; he eventually sold his twenty percent interest in the team in 1980 for $1.4 million. Another syndicate he headed purchased the Indians in 1972 for $10 million from Vernon Stouffer. His partnership that purchased the Indians included Howard Metzenbaum and Ted Bonda.

Soon after winning the Cavaliers franchise, Mileti realized that Cleveland Arena was nearing the end of its useful life. However, when politicians balked at building a new arena downtown, he bought land in Richfield, halfway between Cleveland and Akron, and built the Richfield Coliseum, at the time the largest arena in the country.

In late 1972, Mileti formed Ohio Communications with veteran radio executive Tom Embrescia, which acquired WKYC AM/1100 and FM/105.7 from NBC, renaming them "3WE" WWWE-AM and "M105" WWWM-FM. Mileti then moved the radio play-by-play rights for the Indians and Cavaliers, as well as pioneering sports talk host Pete Franklin's Sportsline, to WWWE. Already the most powerful AM station in Cleveland, with a 50,000 watt clear channel signal, WWWE quickly turned into a sports radio powerhouse.

In his sports ownership heyday, Mileti was a master of leverage of sorts, owning 51 percent of his enterprises with little of his own money at risk. This practice came back to haunt him not long after he bought the Indians. He only paid for controlling interest with $500,000 of his own money, with the rest secured through loans. The lenders first grew concerned when the construction of the Richfield Coliseum was bogged down by lawsuits and cost overruns.

Despite this, Mileti had ambitious plans for reviving a team that had spent the better part of the last two decades in the bottom half of the American League. One of his first acts as owner was to hire new scouts; Stouffer had made drastic cuts to player development. However, his plans were undone when two major partners in his Indians syndicate, Steve O'Neill and Gabe Paul, joined George Steinbrenner's bid to buy the New York Yankees. While Mileti was able to find new investors, it wasn't enough to restore the confidence of his lenders, who believed he was spread too thin. Mileti was forced to name Bonda as the team's executive vice president and chairman. For all intents and purposes, his tenure as owner was over, though Mileti didn't formally sell out his stake to Bonda until 1975.

Mileti also founded and was the principal owner of the short-lived CFL team, the Las Vegas Posse in 1994.

Mileti became a writer in retirement; he published three books. He was inducted into the Cavaliers Wall of Honor in 2019.

== Death ==
Mileti died on August 21, 2024, at the age of 93 in Westlake, Ohio.

== Publications ==
- Closet Italians: A Dazzling Collection of Illustrious Italians with Non-Italian Names (2004)
- Beyond Michaelangelo: The Deadly Rivalry between Borromini and Bernini (2005)
- The Unscrupulous: Scams, Cons, Fakes & Frauds that Poison the Fine Arts, (2009) Bordighera Press

== Honors ==
In 2019, Mileti was inducted into the Cavaliers "Wall of Honor", which recognizes prominent figures in team history.

== See also ==
- Cleveland Indians managers and ownership

Sporting positions
New creation	Cleveland Cavaliers owner 1970–1980	Succeeded by Ted Stepien
Preceded by Vernon Stouffer	Owner of the Cleveland Indians; 1972–1975	Succeeded by Ted Bonda
Preceded by Gabe Paul	President of the Cleveland Indians; 1972–1975	Succeeded by Ted Bonda
