= List of Cleveland Guardians managers =

The Cleveland Guardians (formerly known as the Indians) are a professional baseball franchise based in Cleveland, Ohio that formed in 1901. They are members of the Central division of Major League Baseball's American League. The current manager of the Guardians is Stephen Vogt, who replaced Terry Francona after he stepped down at the end of the 2023 season.

Cleveland has had 47 managers in their major league history. Jimmy McAleer became the first manager of the then Cleveland Blues in 1901, serving for one season. In 1901, McAleer was replaced with Bill Armour. Cleveland made their first playoff appearance under Tris Speaker in 1920. Out of the eight managers that have led Cleveland into the postseason, only Speaker and Lou Boudreau have led Cleveland to World Series championships, doing so in 1920 and 1948, respectively. Al López (1954), Mike Hargrove (1995 and 1997) and Terry Francona (2016) have also appeared in World Series with Cleveland. The highest winning percentage of any manager who managed at least one season was López, with a percentage of .617. The lowest percentage was Johnny Lipon's .305 in 1971, although he managed for only 59 games. The lowest percentage of a manager with at least one season with Cleveland was McAleer's .397 in 1901.

Francona managed more regular season games (1,678) than any other Cleveland manager. Francona is also the winningest manager in Cleveland MLB history, with 921 wins. Charlie Manuel, Eric Wedge, Speaker, Boudreau, López, Hargrove, Francona, and Vogt are the only managers to have led Cleveland into the playoffs. Speaker, Boudreau, López, Walter Johnson, Joe Gordon, Nap Lajoie and Frank Robinson are the seven members of the Baseball Hall of Fame who are also former managers of this club. Of those seven, López is the only one inducted as a manager. Wedge, Francona, and Vogt are the only Cleveland managers to win the Manager of the Year award: Wedge in 2007; Francona in 2013, 2016, and 2022; and Vogt in 2024 and 2025.

== Table key ==
WPct	Winning percentage: number of wins divided by number of games managed
PA	Playoff appearances: number of years this manager has led the franchise to the playoffs
PW	Playoff wins: number of wins this manager has accrued in the playoffs
PL	Playoff losses: number of losses this manager has accrued in the playoffs
WS	World Series: number of World Series victories achieved by this manager
† or ‡	Elected to the National Baseball Hall of Fame (‡ denotes induction as manager)

== Managers ==
Statistics current through the 2026 season.

# (Note: A running total of the number of managers of the Guardians. Thus, any manager who has two or more separate terms is counted only once.)	Image	Manager	Seasons	Games	Wins	Losses	WPct	PA	PW	PL	WS	Ref(s)
1		Jimmy McAleer	1901	136	54	82	.397	—	—	—	—	
2		Bill Armour	1902–1904	427	232	195	.543	—	—	—	—	
3		Nap Lajoie^{†}	1905	58	37	21	.638	—	—	—	—	
4		Bill Bradley	1905	41	20	21	.488	—	—	—	—	
—		Nap Lajoie^{†}	1905–1909	628	340	288	.541	—	—	—	—	
5		Deacon McGuire	1909–1911	208	91	117	.438	—	—	—	—	
6		George Stovall	1911	136	74	62	.544	—	—	—	—	
7		Harry Davis	1912	125	54	71	.432	—	—	—	—	
8		Joe Birmingham	1912–1915	361	170	191	.471	—	—	—	—	
9		Lee Fohl	1915–1919	637	327	310	.513	—	—	—	—	
10		Tris Speaker^{†}	1919–1926	1,137	617	520	.543	1	5	2	1	
11		Jack McCallister	1927	153	66	87	.431	—	—	—	—	
12		Roger Peckinpaugh	1928–1933	817	415	402	.508	—	—	—	—	
13		Bibb Falk	1933	1	1	0	1.000	—	—	—	—	
14		Walter Johnson^{†}	1933–1935	347	179	168	.516	—	—	—	—	
15		Steve O'Neill	1935–1937	367	199	168	.542	—	—	—	—	
16		Ossie Vitt	1938–1940	460	262	198	.570	—	—	—	—	
—		Roger Peckinpaugh	1941	154	75	79	.487	—	—	—	—	
17		Lou Boudreau^{†}	1942–1950	1,377	728	649	.529	1	4	2	1	
18		Al López^{‡}	1951–1956	924	570	354	.617	1	0	4	—	
19		Kerby Farrell	1957	153	76	77	.497	—	—	—	—	
20		Bobby Bragan	1958	67	31	36	.463	—	—	—	—	
21		Joe Gordon^{†}	1958–1960	335	184	151	.549	—	—	—	—	
22		Jo-Jo White	1960	1	1	0	1.000	—	—	—	—	
23		Jimmy Dykes	1960–1961	218	103	115	.472	—	—	—	—	
24		Mel Harder	1961	1	1	0	1.000	—	—	—	—	
25		Mel McGaha	1962	160	78	82	.488	—	—	—	—	
—		Mel Harder	1962	2	2	0	1.000	—	—	—	—	
26		Birdie Tebbetts	1963	162	79	83	.488	—	—	—	—	
27		George Strickland	1964	72	33	39	.458	—	—	—	—	
—		Birdie Tebbetts	1964–1966	375	199	176	.531	—	—	—	—	
—		George Strickland	1966	39	15	24	.385	—	—	—	—	
28		Joe Adcock	1967	162	75	87	.463	—	—	—	—	
29		Alvin Dark	1968–1971	587	266	321	.453	—	—	—	—	
30		Johnny Lipon	1971	59	18	41	.305	—	—	—	—	
31		Ken Aspromonte	1972–1974	480	220	260	.458	—	—	—	—	
32		Frank Robinson^{†}	1975–1977	375	186	189	.496	—	—	—	—	
33		Jeff Torborg	1977–1979	358	157	201	.439	—	—	—	—	
34		Dave Garcia	1979–1982	491	247	244	.503	—	—	—	—	
35		Mike Ferraro	1983	100	40	60	.400	—	—	—	—	
36		Pat Corrales	1983–1987	635	280	355	.441	—	—	—	—	
37		Doc Edwards	1987–1989	380	173	207	.455	—	—	—	—	
38		John Hart	1989	19	8	11	.421	—	—	—	—	
39		John McNamara	1990–1991	239	102	137	.427	—	—	—	—	
40		Mike Hargrove	1991–1999	1,312	721	591	.550	5	27	25	—	
41		Charlie Manuel	2000–2002	410	220	190	.537	1	2	3	—	
42		Joel Skinner	2002	76	35	41	.461	—	—	—	—	
43		Eric Wedge	2003–2009	1,134	561	573	.495	1	6	5	—	
44		Manny Acta	2010–2012	480	214	266	.446	—	—	—	—	
45		Sandy Alomar Jr.	2012	6	3	3	.500	—	—	—	—	
46		Terry Francona	2013–2023	1,678	921	757	.548	6	16	17	—	(Note: Francona managed only 14 games during the 60-game 2020 season due to health issues. He is credited with the 28 wins and 18 losses of acting manager Sandy Alomar Jr. Francona stepped aside for health reasons during the 2021 season after managing 99 games. He is credited with the 30 wins and 33 losses of acting manager DeMarlo Hale.)
47		Stephen Vogt	2024–present	485	265	220	.546	3	10	11	—	
Totals				19,383	10,025	9,520	.513	18	65	66	2	

== See also ==
- Cleveland Guardians all-time roster
- List of Cleveland Guardians owners and executives
- List of Cleveland Guardians seasons
