= Vernon Stouffer =

American businessman

Vernon B. Stouffer
- Born: August 22, 1901; Cleveland, Ohio, U.S.
- Died: July 26, 1974 (aged 72); Cleveland, Ohio, U.S.
- Education: The Wharton School
- Occupations: Entrepreneur, Philanthropist & Businessman
- Known for: Pioneer of frozen food industry Stouffer Hotels; Stouffer Restaurants and owner of the Cleveland Indians & founder Cleveland Stokers

Vernon Bigelow Stouffer (August 22, 1901 – July 26, 1974) was an American entrepreneur, philanthropist & businessman. Stouffer graduated from The Wharton School of the University of Pennsylvania in 1923. He was the founder and president of the Stouffer Hotels Co., Stouffer Frozen Foods Co. Stouffer's Restaurants Co., and Cottage Creamery Co., all operated under the umbrella of The Stouffer Corporation, established and incorporated on January 4, 1929, by Vernon and his father, Abraham E. Stouffer. Vernon Stouffer was recognized as pioneering the frozen food and microwavable foods industry.

From the Stouffer family's earliest recorded business ventures, which included Cottage Creamery Co. (1898) and Stouffer’s Medina County Creamery Co. (1905), Vernon continued the family's generational contributions.

== Frozen-food company ==
In 1967, Litton Industries announced plans to acquire the Stouffer Foods Corporation for stock estimated at $100 million. While Stouffer Foods became a Litton subsidiary, it remained based in Cleveland under Vernon Stouffer and his management team.

== Baseball team ownership ==
Stouffer bought a stake in the Cleveland Indians of the American League in 1962, and bought controlling interest from William R. Daley in August 1966. The Indians had endured a stretch of humdrum seasons following their heyday in the late 1940s and 1950s, and had seriously considered moving twice in the early 1960s due to poor attendance. However, the team had signed a 10-year lease at Municipal Stadium after the 1963 season, and the presence of a wealthy owner with strong Cleveland roots seemed to assure that the Indians would have the resources to get back into contention–in Cleveland. As part of the deal, team president and general manager Gabe Paul, who had also been a minority owner since 1962, stayed on as general manager and head of baseball operations.

Unfortunately for Stouffer, soon after the Litton merger closed, Litton stock went into a tailspin; only three months after the merger, Litton had lost over half of its value. Stouffer had little option but to take the massive losses, as he had bought a substantial block of Litton stock and agreed to hold onto it for several years after the merger. With much of his paper wealth having vanished, Stouffer was left with little of the resources he intended to use to rebuild the team. For example, in 1970 he ordered the player development budget cut by $1.2 million, cut ties with one of the team's five minor league affiliates and cut back the scouting staff. Years later, Hank Peters, then the Indians player personnel chief, recalled asking Stouffer if he was serious about keeping the team, since if not he had effectively "committed suicide." This was one of many cases in which Stouffer wound up micromanaging the team after initially promising to leave baseball matters in Paul's hands.

While the Indians briefly rose to third place in 1968, it would not last. By 1971, they had tumbled to the worst record in baseball. In hopes of staunching the bleeding, Stouffer proposed playing 30 games per season in New Orleans starting in 1974, when the Superdome was due to open. However, the other American League owners turned the idea down out of hand. Later in 1971, Cleveland shipping magnate George Steinbrenner, who had been a classmate of Stouffer's son, offered to buy the team for $8.6 million. However, Stouffer turned it down. Not only was he angered that the proposed deal had leaked in the press, but he believed the offer was at least $1 million too low.

Finally, in 1972, Stouffer sold out to a group headed by Cleveland Cavaliers founder Nick Mileti. He subsequently described his tenure as Indians owner as the longest five years of his life.

== Recognition ==
Stouffer was a trustee for Litton Industries, United Airlines, Republic Steel, and Society Natl. Bank. In 1966, he established the Stouffer Prize, recognizing research in hypertension and arteriosclerosis. He was president of the Zoological Society and a founder of the Natl. Recreation & Park Assoc. In 1996 Vernon Stouffer were honored posthumously along with Conrad Hilton & J. W Marriott for the Hospitality Industry Hall of Honor.

== See also ==
- Cleveland Indians managers and ownership

Preceded by Gabe Paul	Owner of the Cleveland Indians; 1966 — 1972	Succeeded by Nick Mileti
