= Ted Bonda =

American baseball executive (1917–2005)

Bonda

Alva Theodore Bonda (1917 - October 22, 2005) was the president of the Cleveland Indians from 1973 to 1978. He was born in Cleveland, Ohio, which also served as his death place. He was a partner in Nick Mileti's ownership group who assumed control of the team in 1973, though Mileti wasn't completely bought out until 1975. While with the Indians in 1974 he hired Frank Robinson to be the first African-American baseball manager.

Bonda was a partner with Howard Metzenbaum in Metzenbaum's airport parking company, APCOA Parking. Bonda was also chairman of Avis Car Rental at one time and served on the Cleveland School Board. The Bonda and Metzenbaum were also principal owners of the Cleveland Stokers professional soccer club and in the Indians. Bonda was named after Alva Bradley, a previous Indians owner who owned the building where Bonda's father worked. Bonda was active in civic affairs. He's credited with keeping the franchise in Cleveland at a time when both the franchise and the city were in poor shape.

== Political views ==
Bonda was a liberal Democrat. He dedicated a lot of his wealth to philanthropic endeavors.

Preceded by Nick Mileti	Owner of the Cleveland Indians; 1975 — 1978	Succeeded by Steve O'Neill
Preceded by Nick Mileti	President of the Cleveland Indians; 1975 — 1978	Succeeded by Gabe Paul
