= Manny Acta =

Dominican baseball coach and manager (born 1969)

Manny Elias Acta
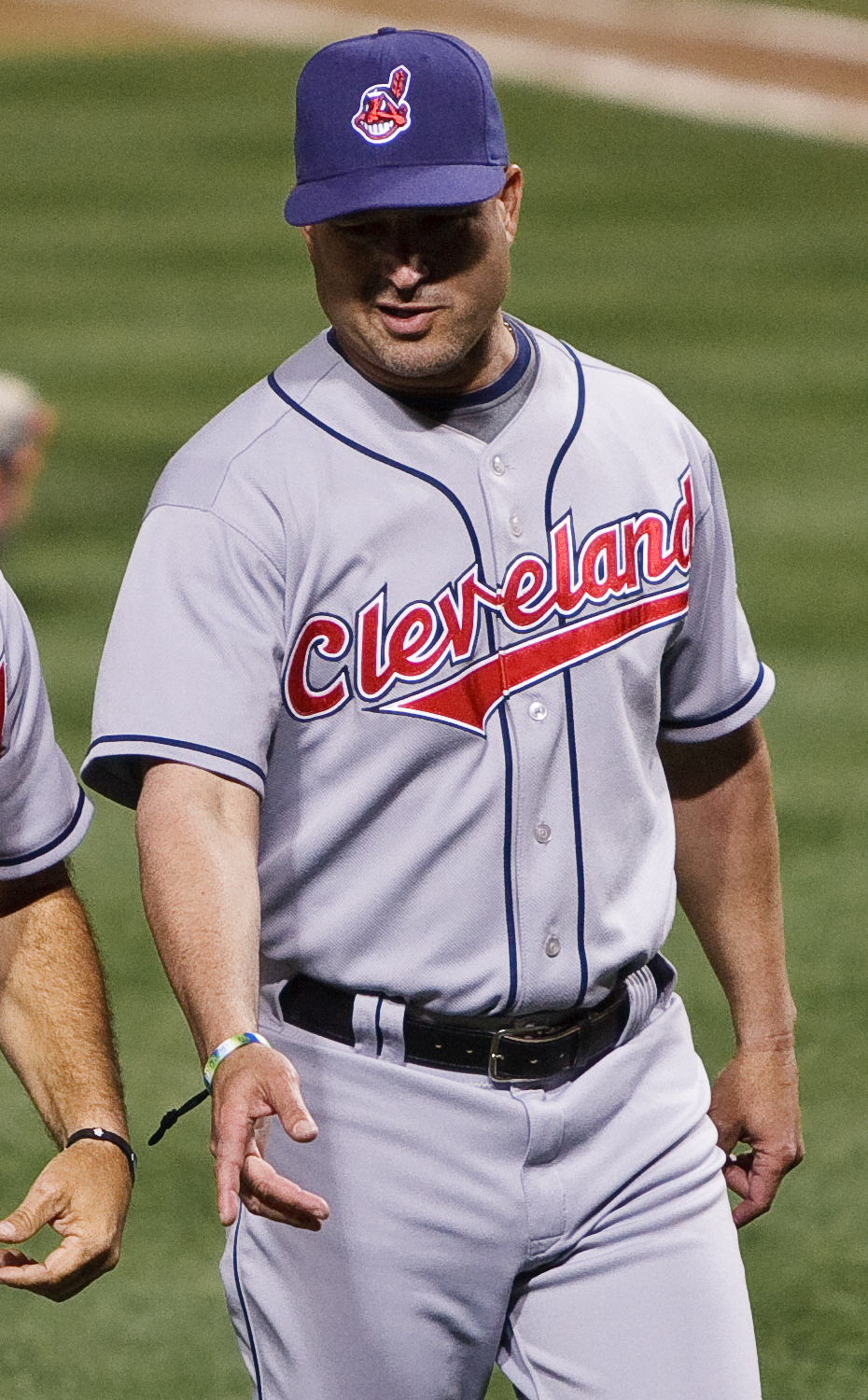
- Acta with the Cleveland Indians in May 2010
- Third base coach / Bench coach / Manager
- Born: January 11, 1969 (age 57); San Pedro de Macorís, Dominican Republic
- Batted: Right Threw: Right

MLB debut
- April 2, 2007, for the Washington Nationals

Last MLB appearance
- September 26, 2012, for the Cleveland Indians

MLB statistics
- Games managed: 890
- Win–loss record: 372–518
- Winning %: .418
- Stats at Baseball Reference
- Managerial record at Baseball Reference

Teams
- As manager: Washington Nationals (2007–2009); Cleveland Indians (2010–2012); As coach: Montreal Expos (2002–2004); New York Mets (2005–2006); Seattle Mariners (2016–2026)

Manuel Elias Acta (born January 11, 1969) is a Dominican former professional baseball manager. He has formerly served as a broadcast analyst for ESPN and ESPN Deportes. He has also served as manager for the Washington Nationals and the Cleveland Indians of Major League Baseball (MLB).

In the Dominican Winter League, he has been successful both as a manager and a general manager: he managed the Tigres del Licey from 2003 to 2005, including leading them to victory at the 2004 Caribbean Series. As a general manager, he won with the Tigres del Licey in the 2013-14 season and then did the same with Águilas Cibaeñas in 2018. Acta managed the Dominican Republic team at the 2006 World Baseball Classic where they placed 4th.

== Playing career ==
=== Houston Astros ===
Acta was signed by the Houston Astros at age 17 as an undrafted free agent infielder. Acta played baseball professionally for six seasons, all in the Astros' system, but never reached the major leagues as a player. The Astros organization would eventually send him to scouting school in Florida to utilize his analytical skills rather than his athletic talent.

== Coaching career ==
=== Minor leagues ===
In 1991, Acta became a player-coach at the A level, and soon after that quit his playing career and focused solely on coaching. He became the manager of the A-level Auburn Astros team at Auburn, New York in 1993, and he managed in the minors through 2000. He led the Kissimmee Cobras to a Florida State League championship in 1999.

=== Montreal Expos ===
Acta was hired as the third base coach for the Montreal Expos under Frank Robinson in 2002, and held that position through 2005.

=== New York Mets ===
In 2005 Acta was hired as the third base coach for the New York Mets under manager Willie Randolph. He held this position for two years, leaving to become the manager of the Washington Nationals.

=== Seattle Mariners ===
On November 9, 2015, Acta was hired as the third base coach for the Seattle Mariners under new manager Scott Servais for the 2016 season. Acta was the first person issued #14 as it had been out of circulation since Lou Piniella left the team after the 2002 season.

On November 26, 2024, Acta became the bench coach for the Mariners.

== Managerial career ==
=== Washington Nationals ===
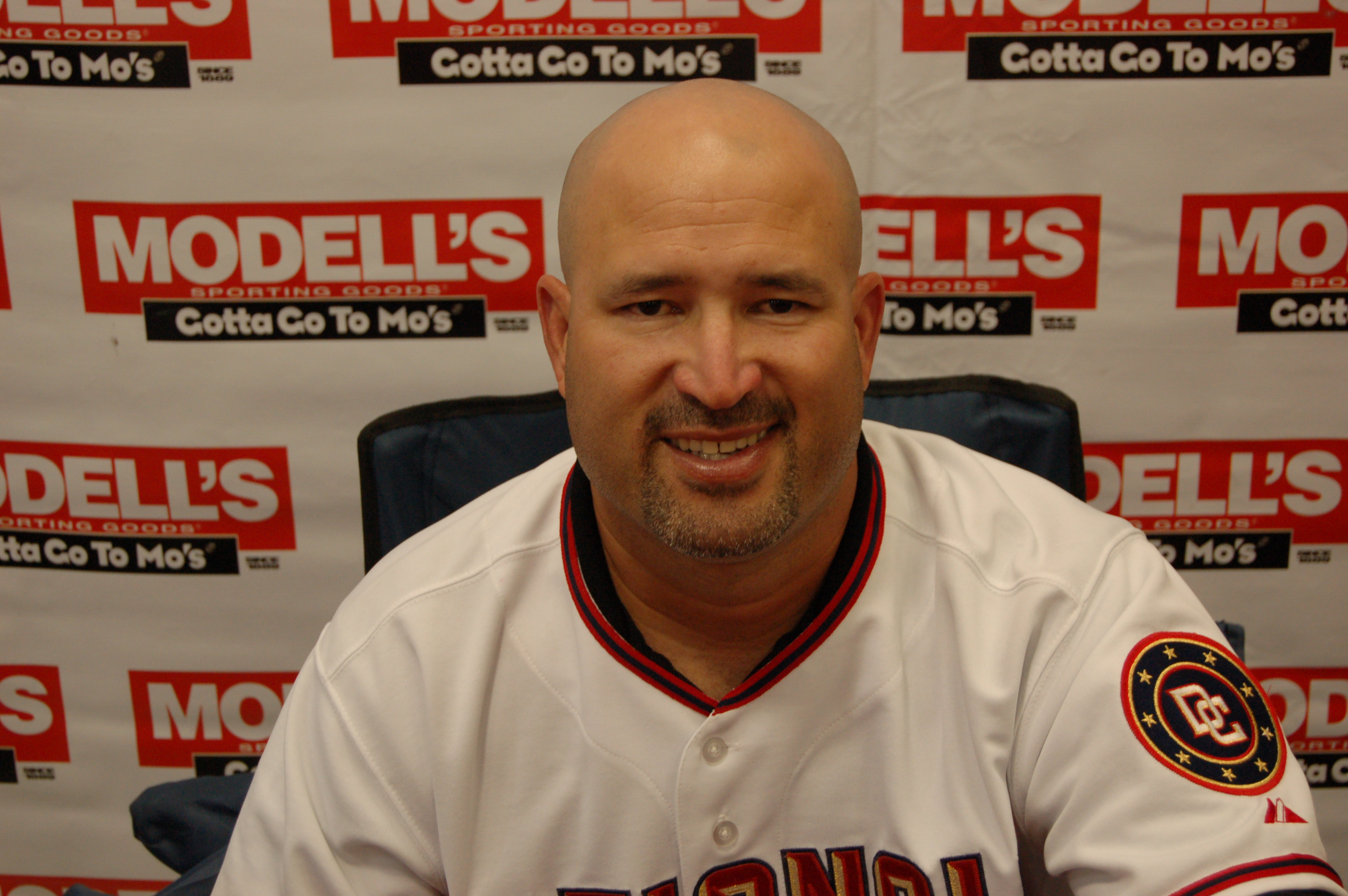
Acta as manager of the Washington Nationals in 2007.

Acta was hired as manager of the Washington Nationals on November 14, 2006, returning to the franchise that gave him his first major league job (the Nationals were the Expos prior to a relocation following the 2004 season). Acta received the job for his youth and enthusiasm, as well as knowing a few of the Nationals players from his third base coaching job with the Expos. In his first season with Washington, projected to be one of the worst teams in Major League Baseball, Acta and the Nationals finished 73–89. With his team beset by many injuries—on Opening Day, he lost starting shortstop Cristian Guzman and center fielder Nook Logan for five weeks and by June, four of his five starting pitchers were on the disabled list—Acta maintained a positive influence on his young Nationals. In his first year with the Nationals he earned votes for NL Manager of the Year, coming in fifth in that vote. In his second season managing the Nats, the team's record worsened to 59–102. Signs of the team progressing in the win column was not being realized during the beginning of his third season with the club. At 26–61, and the Nats coming off a 100-loss season, including a seven-game road trip in which they would win just one game, Acta's time as manager was drawing to a close.

On July 12, 2009, Acta reported he had been fired as Nationals manager following a loss to the Houston Astros. The Nationals announced on their website on July 13 that an announcement concerning the dismissal was forthcoming, which served as a confirmation of the firing. Nationals bench coach Jim Riggleman, who had previously managed the San Diego Padres, Chicago Cubs, and Seattle Mariners, assumed the position as interim manager.

=== Cleveland Indians ===
On October 25, 2009, the Cleveland Indians announced that they had hired Acta as their manager, signing him to a three-year contract with an option for an additional year. The Astros had also offered Acta their managerial position. The Indians struggled in his first year, marginally improving from their 2009 campaign at 69–93. In his second season, the Indians improved by 11 games to 80–82 after starting out the season 30–15. Cleveland would finish in second place, fifteen games behind the Detroit Tigers. On September 29, 2011, the Indians announced they had exercised Acta's option for the 2013 season.

After a 20–51 record in the second half of the 2012 season, the Indians fired Acta on September 27, 2012 with only six games remaining in the regular season. Bench coach Sandy Alomar Jr. was named interim manager and Terry Francona eventually was named to the position full-time.

=== Seattle Mariners ===
Acta served as interim manager for 2 games in May 2018 as regular manager Scott Servais was gone to attend his daughter's college graduation.

=== Managerial record ===
As of games played on April 10, 2019.

Team	Year	Regular season					Postseason			
Team	Year	Games	Won	Lost	Win %	Finish	Won	Lost	Win %	Result
WAS	2007	162	73	89	.451	4th in NL East	–	–	–	–
WAS	2008	161	59	102	.366	5th in NL East	–	–	–	–
WAS	2009	87	26	61	.299	fired	–	–	–	–
WSH Total		410	158	252	.385		0	0	.000	
CLE	2010	162	69	93	.426	4th in AL Central	–	–	–	–
CLE	2011	162	80	82	.494	2nd in AL Central	–	–	–	–
CLE	2012	156	65	91	.417	fired	–	–	–	–
CLE Total		480	214	266	.446		0	0	.000	
Total		890	372	518	.418		0	0	.000	

== Personal life ==
Acta comes from a family of Lebanese descent that settled in San Pedro de Macorís a century ago.

The fatal plane crash on October 11, 2006, that killed New York Yankees pitcher Cory Lidle and his pilot crashed into Acta's apartment building in New York while he was still coaching for the Mets. Acta wasn't there at the time because he had gone to Shea Stadium to prepare for that night's Game 1 of the NLCS between the Mets and St. Louis Cardinals.

His ImpACTA Kids Foundation has raised a significant amount of awareness and donations in providing children with the opportunities to achieve their dreams. As of 2010, the ImpACTA Kids Foundation has awarded $5,000 in college scholarships in the United States and neared completion of an athletic/education youth complex in Consuelo, Dominican Republic.

== See also ==
- List of Cleveland Guardians managers

Sporting positions
Preceded by Steve Dillard	Auburn Astros Manager; 1993–1995	Succeeded by last Auburn Astros Manager
Preceded by first Auburn Doubledays Manager	Auburn Doubledays Manager; 1996	Succeeded by Mike Rojas
Preceded by Jim Pankovits	Quad City River Bandits; 1997	Succeeded by Mike Rojas
Preceded by John Tamargo	Kissimmee Cobras Manager; 1998–2001	Succeeded by last Kissimmee Cobras Manager
Preceded by Jeff Cox	Montreal Expos Third Base Coach; 2002–2004	Succeeded by last Montreal Expos Third Base Coach
Preceded by Matt Galante	New York Mets Third Base Coach; 2005–2006	Succeeded by Sandy Alomar Sr.
Preceded by Rich Donnelly	Seattle Mariners Third Base Coach; 2016–2017	Succeeded by Scott Brosius
Preceded by Tim Bogar	Seattle Mariners bench coach 2018–	Succeeded by Incumbent
