= Myron H. Wilson =

MLB baseball owner (1887–1962)

- Born: Myron Henry Wilson Jr. September 9, 1887; Cleveland, Ohio, U.S.
- Died: August 19, 1962 (aged 74); Cleveland, Ohio, U.S.
- Education: Sheffield Scientific School; Yale University
- Occupations: Businessman, insurance executive
- Known for: Owner of the Cleveland Indians, 1952–1956

Myron Henry "Mike" Wilson Jr. (September 9, 1887 – August 19, 1962) was the principal owner of the Cleveland Indians baseball team of the American League from 1952 through 1956. He was a native of Cleveland. In 1952, Wilson purchased Ellis Ryan's share of the franchise to become president and principal owner. In 1956, Wilson and other minority shareholders sold the Indians to William R. Daley.

Wilson stayed on as team president until his death in 1962 at the Cleveland Clinic in Cleveland, Ohio after a one-month hospitalization. He was 74.
