= Steve O'Neill (owner) =

American businessman and baseball executive

Francis J. "Steve" O'Neill (September 18, 1899 – August 29, 1983) was the principal owner of the Cleveland Indians of the American League from 1978 through 1983. In 1978, O'Neill purchased the Indians from the ownership group headed by Ted Bonda. After his death, O'Neill's estate owned the team until Richard E. Jacobs purchased the Indians in 1986.

O'Neill was a lifelong resident of Cleveland. His family made its fortune in the trucking business. He bought a minority interest in the Indians in 1961, and was a limited partner during the tenures of William R. Daley, Gabe Paul, and Vernon Stouffer. In 1973, however, he sold his Indians interest to become a limited partner in George Steinbrenner's syndicate that bought the New York Yankees. Five years later, he sold off his Yankees interest and bought a 63 percent stake in the Indians. He was the controlling partner of the team until his death in 1983.

O'Neill attended the University of Notre Dame, where he played basketball.
