= William R. Daley =

MLB baseball owner (1892–1971)

- Born: September 26, 1892; Ashtabula, Ohio, U.S.
- Died: October 21, 1971 (aged 79); Cleveland, Ohio, U.S.
- Education: Adelbert College (1915); Western Reserve University (1917)
- Known for: Owner of the Cleveland Indians, 1956–1962; Co-owner of the Seattle Pilots, 1969

William R. Daley (September 26, 1892 – October 21, 1971) was a businessman and owner of two franchises in Major League Baseball's American League. He was born in Ashtabula, Ohio in 1892.

Daley was the principal owner of the Cleveland Indians from 1956 through 1966. In 1956, Daley purchased Myron H. Wilson's share of the franchise to become principal owner. He headed a syndicate that included general manager Hank Greenberg, who had been operating head of the franchise for most of the 1950s. However, Greenberg was pushed out as general manager in 1957, and sold his stake in the team a year later after an unsuccessful attempt to wrest control from Daley.

Amid sluggish attendance in 1958, Daley hinted in August that he was considering moving the team. However, after a "Back the Indians Night" drew 50,000 fans to Municipal Stadium despite dreadful weather, as well as a season ticket drive, Daley announced the Indians would stay in Cleveland indefinitely.

A number of sources say that in 1962, Daley sold the Indians to a group headed by Gabe Paul, who had arrived as general manager only a year earlier. However, when Paul bought into the team, Daley remained chairman, and brought in a number of new investors who looked to him as head of the franchise. While Paul was the largest single shareholder, with a 20 percent stake, Daley and his bloc retained 70 percent of the team. In 1966, he sold the Indians to one member of that bloc, Vernon Stouffer.

In 1969, Daley resurfaced when Dewey Soriano asked him to help pay the expansion fee to start the expansion Seattle Pilots. In return for paying most of the fee, Daley bought a 47 percent stake in the new team, becoming the largest shareholder and chairman of the board. He had considered moving the Indians to Seattle in the early 1960s. However, his return to baseball was short-lived; the Pilots went bankrupt after only one season and moved to Milwaukee as the Brewers.

Daley died at Cleveland in 1971 after a long illness.
