= Hank Peters =

American professional baseball executive

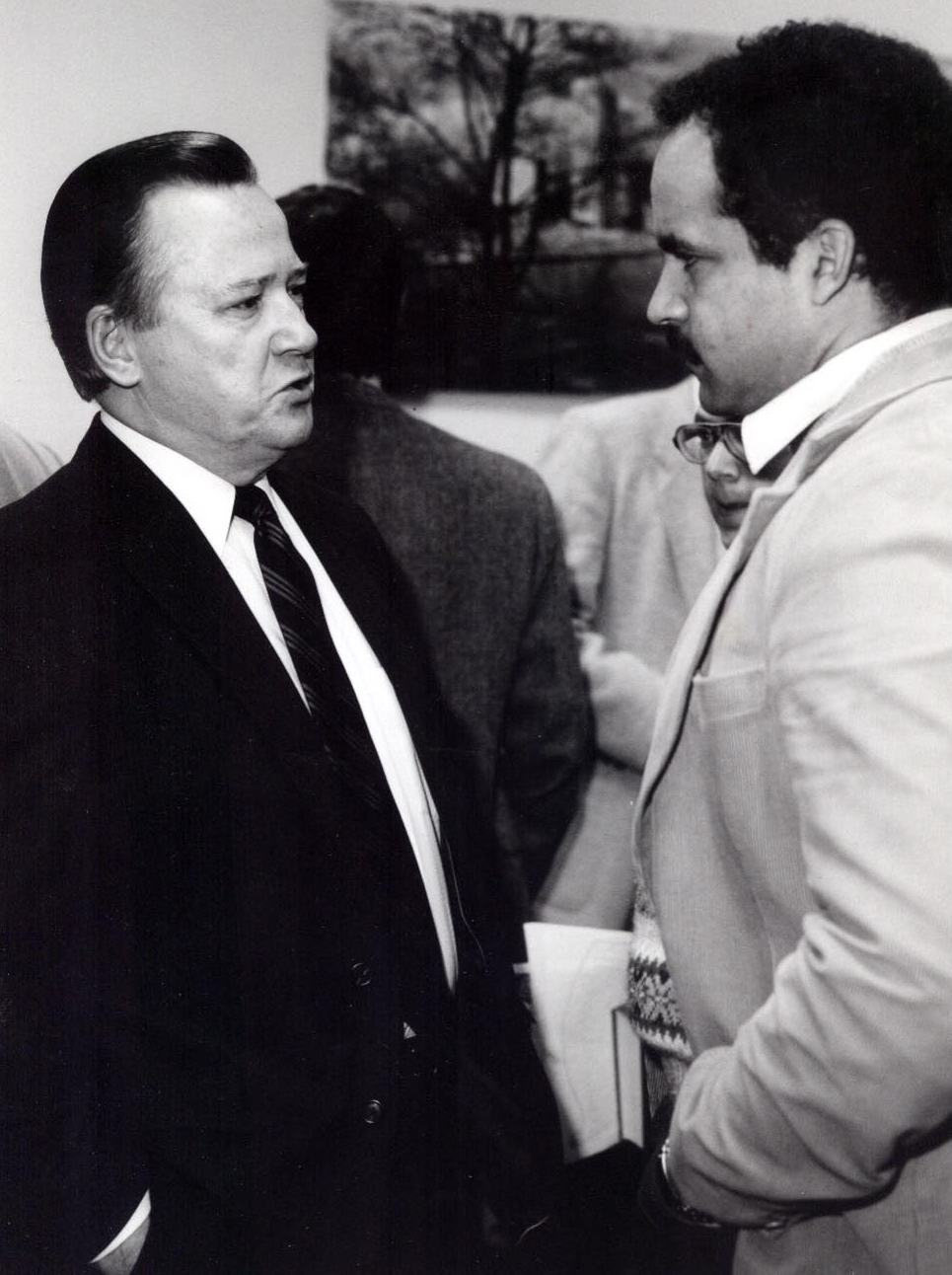
- Peters (left) talking to Maryland Delegate Curt Anderson
- Born: September 16, 1924; St. Louis, Missouri, U.S.
- Died: January 4, 2015 (aged 90); Boca Raton, Florida, U.S.
- Occupation: Major League Baseball executive Baltimore Orioles Hall of Fame

Henry John Peters (September 16, 1924 – January 4, 2015) was an American professional baseball executive who held senior management positions for the Kansas City Athletics, Cleveland Indians and Baltimore Orioles of Major League Baseball between 1965 and 1991. During his dozen years as general manager of the Orioles (1976–1987), Baltimore won two American League pennants (in 1979 and 1983) and the 1983 World Series championship. Peters was named The Sporting News Executive of the Year after both pennant-winning seasons.

In addition, as president of the National Association of Professional Baseball Leagues (1972–1975), Peters was the chief executive of minor league baseball and helped it survive one of the worst crises in its history.

The native of St. Louis, Missouri, spent more than 40 years in organized baseball.

In 2001, Peters was inducted into the Baltimore Orioles Hall of Fame.

== Early life and education ==
Peters graduated from St. Louis's Cleveland High School. After high school, he served for three years in the United States Army during World War II in the European Theater of Operations.

== Baseball career ==
=== Early career ===
Following his military service, Peters joined the St. Louis Browns after answering a newspaper advertisement, and eventually worked his way into their scouting department. When the Browns left St. Louis for Baltimore after the 1953 season, becoming the modern Orioles franchise, Peters stayed in the Midwest. He spent 1954 as general manager of the Burlington Bees of the Class B Illinois–Indiana–Iowa League, then joined the front office of the Kansas City Athletics, newly transplanted from Philadelphia, in 1955.

=== Kansas City Athletics ===
By 1960, Peters was in charge of the Athletics' scouting and minor league system. In the autumn of that year, Charlie Finley bought the team, and Peters became farm system director of the Cincinnati Reds, whose recently hired general manager, Bill DeWitt, was his former boss with the Browns.

Peters spent only one season in Cincinnati before returning to the Athletics and Finley, where he would work for the tempestuous owner for four full seasons and hold the title of general manager during the 1965 campaign. Kansas City finished last in 1965, but it possessed at the big-league level (Bert Campaneris, Dick Green and Catfish Hunter) and in its farm system (Sal Bando, Rollie Fingers, Blue Moon Odom, Gene Tenace, Rick Monday, and others) a core of players that—after the franchise moved to Oakland in 1968—would help the A's win three consecutive world championships from 1972 to 1974.

=== President of minor league baseball ===
After leaving Finley and the Athletics, Peters joined the Indians as director of player personnel and assistant general manager working under Gabe Paul from 1966 to 1971, but the Indians had only one successful season (1968) during that six-year time frame. He then served as the sixth president in the history of the National Association, the umbrella group that governed the minor leagues, during a critical period. The minors had been suffering from over 20 years of plunging attendance, contraction and decline, and were in danger of extinction. The short-season Northern League folded in the autumn of 1971, and other circuits like the Class A Carolina and Western Carolinas leagues, the short-season Northwest League and the Rookie-level Pioneer League, then operating with the bare minimum of four teams, were on the verge of collapsing.

"We had so many leagues that were in danger of going out of business," Peters said. His response was to encourage the creation of "co-op" teams that received players from multiple MLB clubs to keep the struggling leagues afloat. "I spent a lot of my time trying to convince Major League Baseball that they really needed these leagues. I’m proud that we were able to create clubs, getting two or three players from this team and a few from another team and so on, so that we could put together an unaffiliated team and each league could have at least four teams. Some of those leagues that were in trouble are now strong and prosperous."

=== Baltimore Orioles ===
Peters was appointed executive vice president and general manager of the Baltimore Orioles on 3 November 1975. He succeeded Frank Cashen who had returned to team owner Jerold Hoffberger's Carling National Breweries, Inc. as its senior vice president of marketing and sales. The challenge that Peters faced was maintaining the Orioles as perennial contenders despite the limited finances of both the ballclub and the brewery and the advent of free agency in MLB which was made possible by the Seitz decision overturning the reserve clause.

During his initial year in Baltimore, Peters executed a pair of blockbuster deals that were influenced by the oncoming free agency following the 1976 campaign. The first happened just before the start of the regular season when Reggie Jackson, Ken Holtzman and minor-league right-handed pitcher Bill Van Bommel were acquired from the Oakland Athletics for Don Baylor, Mike Torrez and Paul Mitchell on 1 April. The other came at the trade deadline on 15 June when Holtzman, Doyle Alexander, Grant Jackson, Elrod Hendricks and Jimmy Freeman were sent to the New York Yankees for Rudy May, Dave Pagan, Rick Dempsey, Scott McGregor and Tippy Martinez, the last three becoming part of a nucleus that enabled the Orioles to continue as perennial contenders for the next decade. Peters augmented that nucleus with a farm system that produced Eddie Murray, Cal Ripken Jr., Rich Dauer, Mike Flanagan, Dennis Martínez, Sammy Stewart, Mike Boddicker and Storm Davis. The Orioles won the American League pennant in 1979 and 1983 and also captured the World Series in the latter year.

Following the 1983 world championship, the Orioles went into decline, and after enduring their first back-to-back losing seasons in three decades, in 1986–87, Peters was fired on October 5, 1987.

In 2001, Peters was inducted into the Baltimore Orioles Hall of Fame.

=== Cleveland Indians ===
Less than a month later, on November 2, 1987, he returned to the Indians as their president and chief operating officer. Although the Indians never compiled a winning record during Peters' four full years in the job, he lay the foundation for the strong Cleveland teams of the 1990s, signing youngsters Jim Thome, Manny Ramírez and Charles Nagy, and trading for Sandy Alomar Jr. and Carlos Baerga. Peters also brought John Hart from Baltimore to the Indians' organization as his hand-picked successor. As the club's top baseball operations executive from September 1991 through October 2001, Hart would lead the Indians through their period of sustained success that began with their move to Jacobs Field in 1994, including American League pennants in 1995 and 1997.

== Personal ==
Peters was married to the former Dorothy Kleimeier, with whom he had a daughter and a son, until her death in 2010. He died of complications from a stroke in Boca Raton, Florida on January 4, 2015, aged 90.

Sporting positions
Preceded by Pat Friday	Kansas City Athletics general manager 1965	Succeeded by Ed Lopat
Preceded by Frank Cashen	Baltimore Orioles general manager 1975–1987	Succeeded by Roland Hemond
Preceded by Peter Bavasi	Cleveland Indians president 1987–1991	Succeeded by Rick Bay
Awards
Preceded by Spec Richardson; Harry Dalton	Sporting News MLB Executive of the Year; 1979; 1983	Succeeded by Tal Smith; Dallas Green
