= Gabe Paul =

American baseball executive (1910–1998)

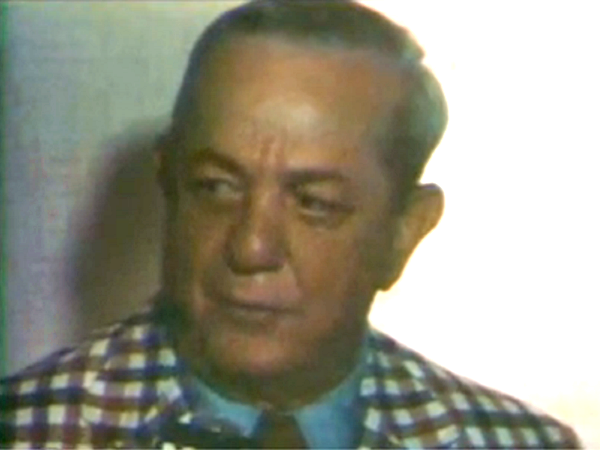
- Paul c. 1977
- General manager / Executive
- Born: January 4, 1910; Rochester, New York, U.S.
- Died: April 26, 1998 (aged 88); Tampa, Florida, U.S.

Teams
- As general manager: Cincinnati Reds (1952–1960); Houston Colt .45s (1960–1961); Cleveland Indians (1961–1968); Cleveland Indians (1971–1973); New York Yankees (1973–1977); As executive: Cleveland Indians (1969–1971); Cleveland Indians (1978–1984)

Career highlights and awards
- World Series champion (1977); 2× Sporting News Executive of the Year (1956, 1974); Cincinnati Reds Hall of Fame

Gabriel Howard Paul (January 4, 1910 – April 26, 1998) was an American executive in Major League Baseball who, between 1951 and 1984, served as general manager of the Cincinnati Reds, Houston Colt .45s, Cleveland Indians and New York Yankees. He also was president and part-owner of the Indians and president and limited partner of the Yankees.

== Early life and career ==
Born in Rochester, New York, and of Jewish descent, Paul got his start in the game at age ten as a shoeshine boy for the Rochester Tribe of the AA International League and later attended Monroe High School. Eventually, he worked for Warren Giles, who became business manager of the renamed Rochester Red Wings when the St. Louis Cardinals purchased the team in 1928. When Giles took over the front office of the Cincinnati Reds in 1937, Paul became the Reds’ traveling secretary. The 1940 season saw turbulence upon the suicide of catcher Willard Hershberger. Paul was the last person to speak to Hershberger before the latter's death, as Paul was asked by manager Bill McKechnie to reach out to him.

After returning from military service during World War II, Paul was promoted to vice president.

== General managing career ==
=== Cincinnati Reds ===
In October 1951, when Giles was elected president of the National League, Paul took his old mentor's job as Cincinnati general manager. The Reds were then a losing outfit with a weak farm system. Paul rebuilt the minor league department and began to scout and sign African-American and Latin American players. Seven years after Jackie Robinson integrated Major League Baseball upon joining the Brooklyn Dodgers, the Reds integrated their team on April 17, 1954, when Nino Escalera and Chuck Harmon made their debuts. Cincinnati became the seventh of the eight National League clubs to integrate; the eighth, the Philadelphia Phillies, would insert their first black player into their lineup on April 22, 1957.

In 1956 at age 20, Frank Robinson, the club's first black superstar, had the best rookie season in NL history, hitting 38 home runs, scoring a league-leading 122 runs, and compiling an OPS of .936. In 1958, Cincinnati unveiled another star African-American player, rookie outfielder Vada Pinson, who would enjoy a long MLB career and, with Robinson, help lead the 1961 Reds to the National League pennant. Paul also signed a working agreement with the Havana Sugar Kings of the Triple-A International League, giving the team access to top Cuban talent such as shortstop Leo Cárdenas and future "Big Red Machine" icon Tony Pérez. In addition, the Reds produced Cuban stars such as outfielder Tony González, second baseman Cookie Rojas, and pitcher Mike Cuellar—among many others—who made their mark with other MLB clubs.

The Cincinnati team of the mid-1950s—then temporarily nicknamed the Redlegs because of the anti-communism of the time—captured the country's imagination as a team of sluggers. With a lineup that included Robinson, Ted Kluszewski, Gus Bell, Wally Post and Ed Bailey, the 1956 Redlegs hit 221 home runs, tying the major-league team record then in place. They also won 91 games to finish third, only two games behind the pennant-winning Brooklyn Dodgers. Paul was named Executive of the Year by The Sporting News. The following year, Baseball Commissioner Ford Frick had to intervene when the Reds were accused of encouraging fans to stuff the ballot to elect Reds players to start in the field, namely by having local newspapers print ballots with Cincinnati players already filled in. Eight Reds players won the voting, but Frick named three players (Willie Mays, Hank Aaron, Stan Musial) to replace three Reds. The 1957 Major League Baseball All-Star Game was the last time fans were allowed to vote until 1970.

The Reds failed to improve upon their 1956 mark during Paul's tenure, however, and after a disappointing 1960 season, Paul resigned. He left after owner Powel Crosley Jr. started to entertain offers to move the Reds out of Cincinnati in favor of New York; the Brooklyn Dodgers and New York Giants had left the City and moved to Los Angeles and San Francisco respectively following the 1957 season, and the Reds were considered a serious option to return National League baseball to the nation's largest city. The uncertainty of the Reds' situation led Paul to agree to serve as GM of the expansion Houston Colt .45s. He later called it the worst mistake of his life. Bill DeWitt succeeded him as GM in Cincinnati. In nine seasons as general manager, the Reds had a winning season twice (1956, 1958) while finishing above fourth place once (the 1956 team finished two games out of a pennant). The next year, with a core assembled by Paul and an owner that passed suddenly in March, the Reds advanced to the 1961 World Series, winning their first pennant in decades.

In 2023, Paul was elected to the Cincinnati Reds Hall of Fame and Museum.

=== Houston and Cleveland ===
Craig Cullinan Jr. and George Kirksey, who each had served as key figures in pushing major league baseball in Texas, hired Paul. However, their small shares in the team meant that Roy Hofheinz would assert his authority in trying to manage the team in all affairs. Paul brought to Houston key Cincinnati executives or scouts Tal Smith, Bill Giles, Bobby Mattick and Paul Florence, and began to lay the foundation for the team's 1962 debut, but he did not stay long. After six months, he reportedly received a standing offer from the Cleveland Indians to take over their front office, following the January 1961 resignation of Frank Lane. In late April 1961, Paul returned to Ohio to assume command of the Indians, leaving the Colt .45s almost a year before the team ever played an official game.

The Indians of the early 1960s were a middle-echelon team in the American League that had contended for a pennant only twice (1955 and 1959) since its 1954 AL title. It had lost its most popular gate attraction, slugger Rocky Colavito, in a Lane-engineered trade just before the 1960 season, and the young players summoned from the team's farm system failed to capture the city's imagination. On November 26, 1962, Paul became a part-owner, as well as president, treasurer and general manager. Some sources describe him as replacing William R. Daley as principal owner. In truth, at the same time Paul bought into the Indians, Daley remained chairman and recruited a number of new investors who saw him as head of the franchise. The Indians continued to tread water in the standings and struggled badly at the gate. On multiple occasions, the Indians were rumored to be headed elsewhere. In 1964, the club's board of directors authorized Paul to investigate transferring the Indians to one of three cities: Oakland, Dallas or Seattle. But a new stadium lease with the city of Cleveland staved off the move. Two years later, Daley sold the team to frozen food magnate Vernon Stouffer, who retained Paul as general manager.

On the field, Paul brought to Cleveland pitching stars Sam McDowell and Luis Tiant, and in 1965 reacquired Colavito in a bid to win more games and more fans. But, after an encouraging 1968 season, the Indians plummeted in the standings. For a while, between 1969 and 1971, Paul gave up most of his powers to field manager Alvin Dark in an effort to change the club's fortunes. He returned as GM fulltime in 1971, where he presided over the position until January 1973. In his total tenure of twelve seasons as Indians general manager, the team had a record of .500 or better three times while finishing above fourth place once (1968), all while going through nine different managers (which included five interim hires).

=== New York Yankees club president/general manager ===
In 1971, George Steinbrenner, a ship-building magnate born in Ohio, had tried to buy the Indians from Vernon Stouffer but was rejected. After the failure, he told Paul to keep his ears open in case an offer to buy a team came up. The following year, Paul informed Steinbrenner that CBS was looking to sell the New York Yankees. Weeks later, Steinbrenner had lined up a syndicate that would purchase the team. Eight days after Steinbrenner's group announced their acquisition of the Yankees on January 3, 1973, Paul sold his interest in the Indians and joined the syndicate. Installed as club president that year after the April departure of minority owner E. Michael Burke and the year-end election of GM/interim president Lee MacPhail to the presidency of the American League, Paul helped Steinbrenner rebuild the once-proud Yankees into a champion. In 1974, Paul was selected MLB Executive of the Year for the second time in his career, as the Yankees finished second in the American League East Division and improved by nine games from the 1973 edition. The final piece of the puzzle was the hiring of Billy Martin as manager in 1975, which Steinbrenner did over the objections of Paul. Then, the Bombers won their first American League pennant in twelve years in 1976.

The key to re-building the Yankees was a series of trades that Paul pulled off. Paul raised some eyebrows among Cleveland fans because less than two months before he became a part of the group purchasing the Yankees and assumed the role of President for the Yankees, he dealt All-Star third baseman Graig Nettles and catcher Gerry Moses to the New York Yankees for a group of journeyman players. Then he acquired in succession: Chris Chambliss, Dick Tidrow and Oscar Gamble from his former team, the Indians; Lou Piniella from the Royals; Mickey Rivers and Ed Figueroa from the Angels; Willie Randolph, Ken Brett and Dock Ellis from the Pirates; and Bucky Dent from the White Sox. Paul also made sure to not go with trades that Steinbrenner wanted to do, such as including a young propsect in a trade named Ron Guidry. He also signed Catfish Hunter and Reggie Jackson as free agents. Paul attempted to quit in the 1976 season, but Steinbrenner implored him to stay on, complete with writing a list of promises of independence. Paul stayed on, although he would spend a variety of time during the year keeping the peace between Martin and Steinbrenner, as the latter wanted Paul to "talk about the conduct of the game," to Martin, who was drinking heavily and pursuing women on a constant basis (which included Paul's daughter). The fall of that year was the dawn of free agency, and Paul remained silent while Steinbrenner attempted to court Reggie Jackson despite the objections of Martin (the wooing worked, as Jackson, alongside Catfish Hunter, ended up being signed by the Yankees).

Paul, whose nickname was the "Smiling Cobra" for his expertise in trades, had his enemies, among them influential Cleveland radio host Pete Franklin, who said of Paul, "Gabe was a master at working the room, of getting to know everybody and knowing where all the bodies are. The thing about Gabe was that while he did work for an owner, he always found a way to get a piece of the team himself. Then it became damn near impossible to fire him because he was part-owner. Gabe's greatest gift was the ability to take care of Gabe." The 1977 season was a wild one that saw Paul suffer a cerebral spasm two weeks into the season and then have to convince Steinbrenner to not fire Martin after a June 18 televised scuffle between Martin and Jackson. The Yankees were able to beat the Los Angeles Dodgers in the 1977 World Series, Paul's only World Series victory as a general manager and the first world championship for the Yankees since 1962. He was reported as savoring the parade, stating “I think one of the biggest thrills I ever had was the ride up Broadway after we won the championship in ’77. It was pouring rain and we were in open cars riding up Broadway. It was the liveliest crowd I ever saw.”

After the year ended, he left the team. He finished with four out of five winning seasons as general manager of the Yankees with two American League pennants and one world championship, the only times that Paul assembled a team that made the postseason (half of the 1977 team was assembled by acquisitions Paul did). Steinbrenner remarked upon his departure by saying, "He was in baseball for 40 years, and did he ever win a pennant before? You think he made all those brilliant moves with this team himself? You think all of a sudden he got brilliant?" Upon Paul's death, Steinbrenner noted that he was "a great, great baseball man. He knew all there was to know in this game and he probably came to me with more trades than all my other general managers combined." Years later, it was discovered that Paul had made a series of tapes that dealt with his time with Steinbrenner, as he would put on a tape recorder and drink scotch after arriving home from work. Paul's son found the tapes and a diary years later in a garage; select portions were later cited in Bill Madden's book The Last Lion of Baseball about Steinbrenner.

== Last years ==
After Al Rosen was brought into the Bronx as a senior executive in fall 1977—crowding Paul's authority much as Paul's presence did Mike Burke—Paul returned to Cleveland as in 1978 at the request of longtime friend and new Indians owner Steve O'Neill. Paul resumed the presidency of a team which was nearly bankrupt (in 1980, the team was reported to have lost $2 million). Unfortunately, Paul was unable to rouse the Tribe from their doldrums. From 1978 to 1984, the Indians would have a winning record just twice (1979, 1981) while never finishing above 5th in the American League East Division, and Paul retired after the 1984 season, having spent nearly six decades involved with baseball, 27 as a general manager.

== Personal life ==
Having suffered from strokes and a broken hip, Paul died at the age of 88 at a hospital in Tampa, Florida after battling an extended illness. He was survived by his wife Mary and his five children. His son Gabe Jr. was also a baseball executive, serving the Seattle Pilots as their traveling secretary in their only season of 1969 before they moved to become the Milwaukee Brewers, and Paul Jr stayed on, serving in a variety of capacities such as stadium operations until 1997.

== Portrayals in media ==
Paul was played by Kevin Conway in the 2007 ESPN television mini-series The Bronx Is Burning.

Sporting positions
Preceded by Warren Giles	Cincinnati Reds General manager 1951–1960	Succeeded by Bill DeWitt
Preceded by Franchise created	Houston Colt .45s General manager 1960–1961	Succeeded by Paul Richards
Preceded by Frank Lane; Alvin Dark	Cleveland Indians General manager 1961–1969; 1971–1972	Succeeded by Alvin Dark; Phil Seghi
Preceded by Myron Wilson; Ted Bonda	Cleveland Indians President; 1963–1971; 1978–1985	Succeeded by Nick Mileti; Peter Bavasi
Preceded by Mike Burke	New York Yankees President; 1973–1977	Succeeded by Al Rosen
Preceded by Lee MacPhail	New York Yankees General manager 1974–1977	Succeeded by Cedric Tallis
