= List of hiking trails in the United States =

This is a list of US trails used for walking, hiking, and other activities.

== Alabama ==
- List of hiking trails in Alabama

== Arizona ==
- List of trails in Grand Canyon National Park

== Connecticut ==
- Hiking in Connecticut

== District of Columbia ==
- Anacostia Riverwalk Trail, 20 miles (32 km); Anacostia Riverfront, DC
- Downtown Heritage Trail; Washington, DC
- Greater U Street Heritage Trail; Washington, DC
- Metropolitan Branch Trail, 8 miles (13 km); Union Station, DC to Silver Spring, Maryland
- Mount Vernon Trail, 18 miles (29 km); Mount Vernon Estate, DC to Theodore Roosevelt National Island, DC
- Rock Creek Trails, 3.5 miles (5.6 km); Washington, DC

== Florida ==
- Florida Trail
- List of rail trails in Florida
- List of trails in Brevard County, Florida

== Maine ==
- List of hiking trails in Maine

== Maryland ==
- List of hiking trails in Maryland

== Massachusetts ==
- Midstate Trail, 92 miles (148 km) through Worcester County, Massachusetts

== Michigan ==
- List of rail trails in Michigan
- Michigan Shore-to-Shore Trail
- Trails in Detroit

== Minnesota ==
- List of hiking trails in Minnesota

== New York ==
- List of trails in New York

== North Carolina ==
- North Carolina State Trail System

== Rhode Island ==
- The North–South Trail is a 77-mile (124 km) hiking trail that runs the length of Rhode Island

== South Carolina ==
- List of rail trails in South Carolina

== Wisconsin ==
- List of hiking trails in Wisconsin

== See also ==
- National Trails System
- National Millennium Trail project – 16 long-distance trails selected in 2000 as visionary trails that reflect defining aspects America's history and culture
- Trail, long-distance trail
- List of long-distance trails, Long-distance trails in the United States, List of rail trails
- State wildlife trails (United States)
- Walking, hiking, backpacking
- Appalachian Long Distance Hikers Association
- List of longest cross-country trails in the world
