= List of hiking trails in Maine =

List of trails

This is a list of hiking trails in the U.S. state of Maine.

== By county ==
=== Androscoggin County ===
- Androscoggin Riverlands State Park - Cross-country Ski Trails, 12 miles (19 km); Turner
- Androscoggin Riverlands State Park - Hiking Trails, 23 miles (37 km); Turner
- Androscoggin Riverlands State Park - Mountain Biking Trails, 9.5 miles (15.3 km); Turner
- Androscoggin Riverlands State Park - Snowshoe Trails, 6.2 miles (10.0 km); Turner
- Barker Mill Trail, 0.5 miles (0.80 km); Auburn
- Beaver Park, 6.5 miles (10.5 km); Lisbon
- Corn Shop Trail, 0.3 miles (0.48 km); Turner
- Curtis Homestead, 2.8 miles (4.5 km); Leeds
- David Rancourt River Preserve, 1 mile (1.6 km); Lewiston
- Durham River Park, 0.3 miles (0.48 km); Durham
- ELF Woods Trails, 0.6 miles (0.97 km); Auburn
- Foundry Trail, 0.7 miles (1.1 km); Livermore Falls
- Franklin Pasture Trail, 0.9 miles (1.4 km); Lewiston
- Garcelon Bog, 0.4 miles (0.64 km); Lewiston
- Lake Auburn Community Center, 4.8 miles (7.7 km); Auburn
- Leavitt Area High School, 1.3 miles (2.1 km); Turner
- Lewiston-Auburn Greenway Trails, 1.6 miles (2.6 km); Lewiston and Auburn
- Minot Community Trails, 1.8 miles (2.9 km); Minot
- Monument Hill, 1 mile (1.6 km); Leeds
- Mount Apatite, 7.6 miles (12.2 km); Auburn
- Mount David, 0.2 miles (0.32 km); Lewiston
- Paper Mill Trail, 2.1 miles (3.4 km); Lisbon
- Pettingill Park Trail, 1 mile (1.6 km); Auburn
- Poland Spring Preservation Park, 4.1 miles (6.6 km); Poland
- Poland Town Forest and Bragdon Hill, 6.5 miles (10.5 km); Poland
- Railroad Trail, 1.8 miles (2.9 km); Poland
- Range Ponds State Park, 2 miles (3.2 km); Poland
- Range Ponds State Park - Mountain Bike Trails, 4.1 miles (6.6 km); Poland
- Runaround Pond Recreation Area, 0.6 miles (0.97 km); Durham
- Sherwood Forest Conservation Area, 2.4 miles (3.9 km); Auburn
- Spring Road Trail, 2.1 miles (3.4 km); Auburn
- Summer Street Park, 1.3 miles (2.1 km); Lisbon
- Thorncrag Nature Sanctuary, 4.4 miles (7.1 km); Lewiston
- Union Street Greenway, 0.6 miles (0.97 km); Auburn
- Washburn-Norlands Living History Center, 0.7 miles (1.1 km); Livermore

=== Aroostook County ===
- Aroostook National Wildlife Refuge-West Gate Trails; 5.0 miles (8.0 km); Caribou and Limestone
- Aroostook National Wildlife Refuge--Visitor Center Trails; 5.7 miles (9.2 km); Caswell and Caribou
- America's First Mile Trail, 1.0 mile (1.6 km); Fort Kent
- Fort Kent Riverside Trails, 3.6 miles (5.8 km); Fort Kent
- Hedgehog Mountain Trail, 0.7 miles (1.1 km); Winterville
- Nordic Heritage Center--Single Track Network, 16.1 miles (25.9 km); Fort Fairfield and Presque Isle
- Island Trail, 0.4 miles (0.64 km); Fort Kent
- Snowy Mountain Trails, 2.0 miles (3.2 km); Stockholm
- Split Cedar Trails, 11.3 miles (18.2 km); Van Buren

=== Cumberland County ===
- Androscoggin Riverwalk, 1.3 miles (2.1 km); Brunswick and Topsham
- Arnold Family Forest, Blair Addition, 0.7 miles (1.1 km); Freeport
- Back Cove Trail, 3.6 miles (5.8 km); Portland
- Bliss Woods, 1.1 miles (1.8 km); Freeport
- Bradbury Mountain State Park - Hiking Trails, 21.5 miles (34.6 km); Pownal
- Bradbury Mountain State Park - Mountain Biking Trails, 17.5 miles (28.2 km); Pownal
- Calderwood Trails, 1.1 miles (1.8 km); Freeport
- Captain Alfred Skolfield Preserve, 1 mile (1.6 km); Brunswick
- Chandler Brook Preserve, 2.9 miles (4.7 km); North Yarmouth
- Cousins River Trail, 1.2 miles (1.9 km); Freeport
- Crystal Spring Farm, 5.9 miles (9.5 km); Brunswick
- Deer Hollow Sanctuary, 1 mile (1.6 km); Windham
- Donnabeth Lipman Park, 1.5 miles (2.4 km); Windham
- Intervale Preserve, 0.5 miles (0.80 km); New Gloucester
- Jugtown Forest, 16.9 miles (27.2 km); Casco, Naples, and Otisfield
- Libby Hill Forest, 8.1 miles (13.0 km); Gray
- Mast Landing Audubon Sanctuary, 3.1 miles (5.0 km); Freeport
- Mayberry Hill Preserve, 1 mile (1.6 km); Casco
- Old Town House Park, 3.1 miles (5.0 km); North Yarmouth
- Pineland Public Reserved Land, 3.2 miles (5.1 km); Gray, New Gloucester, and North Yarmouth
- Pisgah Hill Summit Trail, 1.2 miles (1.9 km); New Gloucester
- Pratt's Brook Park, 6.5 miles (10.5 km); Yarmouth
- Raymond Elementary, 1.8 miles (2.9 km); Raymond
- Royal River Park & Beth Condon Pathway, 2.6 miles (4.2 km); Yarmouth
- Sam Ristich Trail Network, 2.1 miles (3.4 km); North Yarmouth
- Skolfield Shores Preserve, 1.1 miles (1.8 km); Harpswell
- West Side Trail, 5.5 miles (8.9 km); Yarmouth
- Wolfe's Neck Woods State Park, 4.4 miles (7.1 km); Freeport

=== Franklin County ===
- Bald Mountain Trail, 3.0 miles (4.8 km); South Franklin
- Blueberry Mountain Trail 2.4 miles (3.9 km); Township 6 North of Weld
- Bonney Woods, 0.7 miles (1.1 km); Farmington
- Clifford Woods, 1.4 miles (2.3 km); Farmington
- Daggett Rock Trail, 0.6 miles (0.97 km); Phillips
- Jay Recreation Area Trail System, 2.8 miles (4.5 km); Jay
- Rangeley Lake State Park 1.6 miles (2.6 km); Rangeley
- Whistle Stop Trail, 14.0 miles (22.5 km); Farmington, Wilton, and Jay

=== Hancock County ===
- Bar Harbor Shore Path, 0.7 miles (1.1 km); Bar Harbor
- Ellsworth Trail, 1.3 miles (2.1 km); Ellsworth
- Kittredge Brook Forest, 2.7 miles (4.3 km); Bar Harbor
- Old Pond Railway Trail, 2.9 miles (4.7 km); Hancock
- Trenton Community Trail, 2.6 miles (4.2 km); Trenton

=== Kennebec County ===
- Allen-Whitney Memorial Forest, 7.6 miles (12.2 km); Manchester
- Augusta Nature Education Center, 4.8 miles (7.7 km); Augusta
- Davidson Nature Preserve, 1.2 miles (1.9 km); Vassalboro
- Gannett Woods and Wyman Memorial Forest, 2.4 miles (3.9 km); Manchester and Readfield
- Gott Pasture Preserve, 1.6 miles (2.6 km); Wayne
- Holman Conservation Area, 2 miles (3.2 km); Litchfield
- Jamies Pond, 5.9 miles (9.5 km); Farmingdale, Hallowell, and Manchester
- Kennebec River Rail Trail, 6.5 miles (10.5 km); Augusta, Farmingdale, Gardiner, and Hallowell
- Macdonald Conservation Area & Readfield Town Farm Forest, 3.4 miles (5.5 km); Readfield and Wayne
- Old Narrow Gauge Rail Trail, 2.6 miles (4.2 km); Randolph
- Perkins Woods, 0.5 miles (0.80 km); Wayne
- Readfield Fairgrounds, 1.8 miles (2.9 km); Readfield
- Small-Burnham Conservation Area, 2.4 miles (3.9 km); Litchfield
- Smithfield Plantation, 1.6 miles (2.6 km); Litchfield
- Torsey Pond Nature Preserve and Echo Lake Watershed Preserve, 1.8 miles (2.9 km); Readfield
- Tyler Conservation Area, 0.9 miles (1.4 km); Readfield
- University of Maine Augusta Fitness Trails, 2.2 miles (3.5 km); Augusta
- Viles Arboretum, 5.0 miles (8.0 km); Augusta
- Woodbury Nature Conservancy, 4.1 miles (6.6 km); Litchfield and Monmouth

=== Knox County ===
- Camden Hills State Park, 26.4 miles (42.5 km); Camden

=== Lincoln County ===
- Pownalborough Court House Trails, 2.7 miles (4.3 km); Dresden

=== Oxford County ===
- Jugtown Forest, 16.9 miles (27.2 km); Casco, Naples, and Otisfield
- Maggie's Nature Park, 3.2 miles (5.1 km); Greenwood
- Ordway Grove Trail, 0.6 miles (0.97 km); Norway
- Packard Trail, 1.8 miles (2.9 km); Buckfield
- Riverside and Viking Trails, 2 miles (3.2 km); Norway and Paris
- Roberts Farm Preserve, 7.5 miles (12.1 km); Norway
- Sebago Lake State Park - Campground, 5.8 miles (9.3 km); Naples
- Sebago Lake State Park - Day Use Area, 4.5 miles (7.2 km); Casco
- Shepard's Farm Family Preserve, 1.6 miles (2.6 km); Norway
- Streaked Mountain Trail, 1.2 miles (1.9 km); Buckfield, Hebron, and Paris
- Whitney Brook Trail, 1.7 miles (2.7 km); Canton
- Witt Swamp Trail, 0.7 miles (1.1 km); Norway

=== Penobscot County ===
- Kenduskeag Stream Trail, 1.7 miles (2.7 km), Bangor
- Sunkhaze Meadows National Wildlife Refuge, 9.2 miles (14.8 km), Milford

=== Piscataquis County ===
- Borestone Mountain, 3.6 miles (5.8 km); Elliotsville Township
- Mount Kineo State Park, 6.1 miles (9.8 km); Kineo Township
- Peaks-Kenny State Park, 6.7 miles (10.8 km); Bowerbank, Dover-Foxcroft

=== Sagadahoc County ===
- Androscoggin Riverwalk, 1.3 miles (2.1 km); Brunswick and Topsham
- Beatrice B. Baxter Memorial Forest, 4.1 miles (6.6 km); Topsham
- Bradley Pond Farm Preserve, 1.8 miles (2.9 km); Topsham
- Cathance River Nature Preserve, 5.6 miles (9.0 km); Topsham
- Cathance River Trail, 2 miles (3.2 km); Topsham
- Foreside Trails, 2.4 miles (3.9 km); Topsham
- Merrymeeting Fields Preserve, 1 mile (1.6 km); Woolwich
- Ravine Trails, 1.5 miles (2.4 km); Topsham
- Swan Island, 8.3 miles (13.4 km); Perkins Township
- Thorne Head Preserve, 3.5 miles (5.6 km); Bath
- Transfer Station Trails, 3.9 miles (6.3 km); Topsham
- Whiskeag Trail, 5 miles (8.0 km); Bath

=== Somerset County ===
- Good Will-Hinckley, 3.3 miles (5.3 km); Fairfield
- Historic Pines Trail, 0.8 miles (1.3 km); Madison
- Lake George Regional Park, 10.1 miles (16.3 km); Canaan and Skowhegan
- Robbins Hill-Wes Baker Trails. 1.4 miles (2.3 km); Solon
- Skowhegan Bog Trail. 0.9 miles (1.4 km); Skowhegan

=== Waldo County ===
- Fort Point State Park, 0.9 miles (1.4 km); Stockton Springs
- Haystack Mountain Trail, 1.1 miles (1.8 km); Liberty and Montville
- Moose Point State Park, 1.5 miles (2.4 km); Searsport

=== Washington County ===
- Calais Walkway, 1.5 miles (2.4 km), Calais
- Quoddy Head State Park, 5.5 miles (8.9 km) Lubec

=== York County ===
- Alewive Woods Preserve, 2.4 miles (3.9 km); Kennebunk
- Sanford-Springvale Rail Trail, 5.9 miles (9.5 km); Sanford

== See also ==
- List of hiking trails in the United States
