= List of hiking trails in Maryland =

This is a list of hiking trails in the U.S. state of Maryland.

== A ==
- Allegheny Highlands Trail of Maryland
- American Discovery Trail
- Anacostia Tributary Trail System
- Appalachian Trail

== B ==
- Baltimore & Annapolis Trail
- Billy Goat Trail
- Borden Tunnel

== C ==
- Capital Crescent Trail
- Catoctin Trail
- Cross Island Trail

== D ==
- Dalecarlia Tunnel

== E ==
- East Coast Greenway
- Eastern Continental Trail

== G ==
- Great Allegheny Passage
- Great Eastern Trail
- Grist Mill Trail
- Gwynns Falls Trail

== H ==
- Herring Run Trail

== I ==
- Indian Head Rail Trail

== J ==
- Jones Falls Trail

== M ==
- Ma and Pa Trail
- Mason-Dixon Trail
- Metropolitan Branch Trail
- Muddy Branch Greenway Trail

== N ==
- North Bethesda Trail
- Northwest Branch Trail

== P ==
- Patuxent Branch Trail
- Potomac Heritage Trail

== R ==
- Rachel Carson Greenway
- Rhode Island Avenue Trolley Trail

== S ==
- Savage Mill Trail
- Seneca Creek Greenway Trail
- Short Line Railroad Trail
- Sligo Creek Trail
- Star-Spangled Banner National Historic Trail

== T ==
- Torrey C. Brown Rail Trail
- Trolley Line Number 9 Trail
- Tuscarora Trail

== W ==
- Washington, Baltimore and Annapolis Trail
- Western Maryland Rail Trail
