= Star-Spangled Banner National Historic Trail =

Trail that commemorates the Chesapeake Campaign of the War of 1812

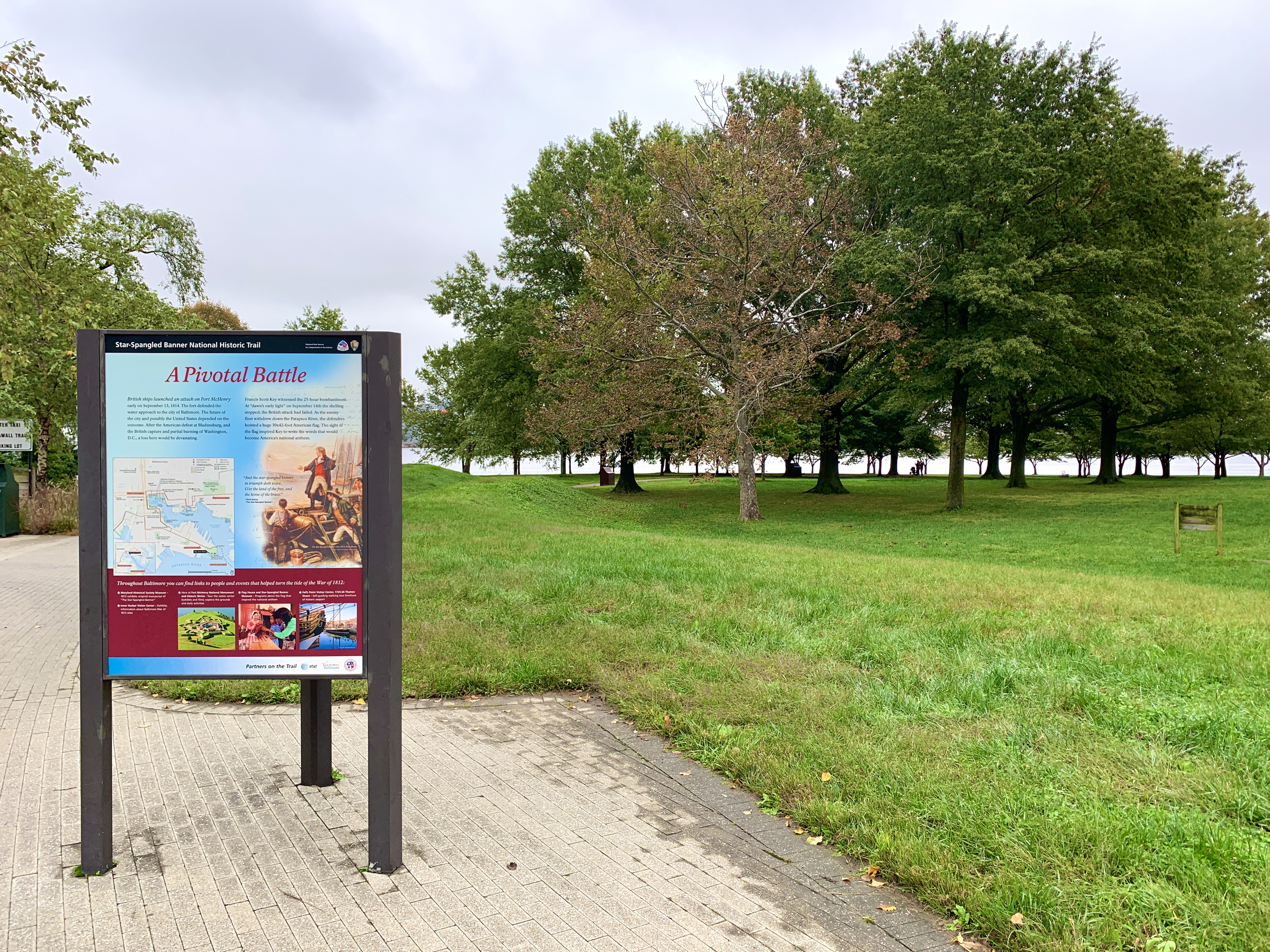
- Star-Spangled Banner National Historic Trail at Fort McHenry

- Location within Virginia Location within the United States
- Location: Maryland, Virginia, and District of Columbia, United States
- Coordinates: 39°15′47″N 76°34′54″W
- Established: May 8, 2008
- Governing body: National Park Service
- Website: Star-Spangled Banner National Historic Trail

The Star-Spangled Banner National Historic Trail is a National Historic Trail that commemorates the Chesapeake Campaign of the War of 1812. The 560-mile (900 km) trail and water route was named after "The Star-Spangled Banner," the national anthem of the United States.

Consisting of water and overland routes, the trail extends from Tangier Island, Virginia, through southern Maryland (passing through the Anacostia Trails Heritage Area), the District of Columbia, the Chesapeake Bay, and Baltimore, Maryland. The trail also contains sites on Maryland's Eastern shore.

Activities on the trail include hiking, biking, boating, and geocaching on the Star-Spangled Banner Geotrail. Sites on the trail include towns raided and/or burned by the British, battles and engagements, museums, and forts.

It was authorized by the Consolidated Natural Resources Act of 2008, which amended the National Trails System Act to include the Star-Spangled Banner National Historic Trail.

== History ==
The Star-Spangled Banner National Historic Trail originated with the Star-Spangled Banner National Historic Trail Study Act of 1999, which authorized the Secretary of the Interior to study routes associated with the Chesapeake Campaign of the War of 1812 for possible designation as a national historic trail. The National Park Service completed the feasibility study and environmental impact statement in March 2004, concluding that the proposed trail met the criteria for national trail eligibility.

Congress designated the trail on May 8, 2008, through an amendment to the National Trails System Act.

== See also ==
- List of hiking trails in Maryland
