= Kennebec Estuary Land Trust =

Non-profit organization in Maine, U.S.

- Established: 1989
- Website: https://www.kennebecestuary.org/

Kennebec Estuary Land Trust (KELT) is a community-based organization in Maine involving members from Arrowsic, Bath, Bowdoinham, Dresden, West Bath, Georgetown, Westport Island, and Woolwich. KELT works to conserve, restore, and instill appreciation of the land and water resources and does their work through conservation easements, property donation and outright purchase. They collaborate with state and federal agencies and private conservation organizations within the Maine Wetlands Protection Coalition.

== History ==
The Kennebec Estuary Land Trust was established in 1989. In the winter of 1991, KELT received its first easement, covering a major portion of Long Island across from Fort Popham. The area covers more than 80 acres and two miles of shoreline.

KELT was originally known as the Lower Kennebec Region Land Trust, and was renamed by a member vote accepting this and other changes to the Bylaws in February 2009. As of 2009, the Kennebec Estuary Land Trust owned 700 acres of land and had 951 acres of land under easement.

== Kennebec Estuary Land Trust leadership ==
The Executive Director of Kennebec Estuary Land Trust is Becky Kolak. The President of Kennebec Estuary Land Trust is Dennis Dunbar.

== Kennebec estuary ==
The Kennebec Estuary is home for every species of waterfowl that uses the Atlantic flyway. The center of the estuary is Merrymeeting Bay, where six rivers meet in an inland freshwater tidal delta.

== Conserved land ==
- Lilly Pond Community Forest
- Merrymeeting Fields Preserve
- Thorne Head Preserve
- Sewall Woods Preserve
- Higgins Mountain Preserve
- Green Point Preserve
- Bonyun Preserve
- Weber Kelly Preserve
- Morse Pond Reserve
