= Range Ponds State Park =

State park in Androscoggin County, Maine

- Location within Maine
- Interactive map of Range Ponds State Park
- Location: Poland, Maine, United States
- Coordinates: 44°02′17″N 70°20′32″W
- Area: 740 acres (300 ha)
- Elevation: 308 ft (94 m)
- Established: 1965
- Administrator: Maine Department of Agriculture, Conservation and Forestry
- Website: Range Ponds State Park
- Maine State Parks

Range Ponds State Park is a public recreation area wrapping around the eastern end of Lower Range Pond in the town of Poland in Androscoggin County, Maine. The state park offers a sandy beach with lifeguard-supervised swimming, kayaking, limited motorized boating, hiking trails, and fishing. Mountain biking trails, built with the help of local volunteers, provide intermediate level, single-track loops off a central double-track trail that winds through mature pine and hardwood forests.

== History ==
The park was created after the State Park and Recreation Commission acquired over 500 acres of land bordering Lower Range Pond in 1965 from Hiram Ricker and Sons, bottlers of Poland Spring Water.

== Range Ponds ==
Upper Range Pond
- Location within Maine
- Location: Poland, Maine
- Coordinates: 44°00′N 70°24′W
- Max. length: 1.6 mi (2.6 km)
- Surface area: 391 acres (158 ha)
- Max. depth: 38 feet (12 m)
- Surface elevation: 305 ft (93 m)

Middle Range Pond
- Location within Maine
- Location: Poland, Maine
- Coordinates: 44°02′N 70°23′W
- Max. length: 1.8 mi (2.9 km)
- Surface area: 366 acres (148 ha)
- Max. depth: 66 feet (20 m)
- Surface elevation: 305 ft (93 m)

Lower Range Pond
- Location within Maine
- Location: Poland, Maine
- Coordinates: 44°03′N 70°22′W
- Max. length: 2.6 mi (4.2 km)
- Surface area: 290 acres (120 ha)
- Max. depth: 46 feet (14 m)
- Surface elevation: 305 ft (93 m)

The three Range Ponds are at the same elevation and connected by narrow necks where bridges carry roads over the pond. Flow sequence is from the upper pond through the middle pond to the lower pond which overflows through Range Brook to the Little Androscoggin River in Mechanic Falls 3 miles (4.8 km) to the north. The ponds have native populations of chain pickerel, white perch, and smallmouth bass, and have been stocked with brown trout and largemouth bass. These species of angling interest prey on native rainbow smelt and stocked alewife. Stocking with rainbow trout and land-locked Atlantic salmon has been discontinued.

=== Upper Range Pond ===
Upper Range Pond is the shallowest of the three ponds. It is the southernmost pond, and the north end connects to the middle pond.

=== Middle Range Pond ===
Middle Range Pond extends from the upper pond at its southern end to the lower pond at its northern end. Maine State Route 26 bridges the narrows where the middle pond connects to the lower pond. Middle pond is the largest and deepest of the three, and supports some lake trout. There is no spawning or nursery habitat for brook trout, but the species is regularly stocked for angling. Black crappie were illegally introduced to the middle pond in the early 21st century.

=== Lower Range Pond ===
Covering 290 acres (120 ha), Lower Range Pond is the smallest, but longest, of the three; and forms the top of a "T" with the middle and lower ponds. The north end of the middle pond connects to a short bay on the southwest side of the lower pond. The state park is on the northeast shore and southeast end of the lower pond, while the northwest end of the lower pond overflows as Range Brook.

== See also ==
- List of Hiking Trails in Maine
