= Patuxent Branch Trail =

Hiking trail in Howard County, Maryland

Coordinates: 39°10′04″N 76°51′1″W

- Length: 10.4 mi (16.7 km)
- Season: Year-round
- Months: Year-round

The Patuxent Branch Trail is a 10.4-mile (16.7 km) trail in Howard County, Maryland, United States. It mostly runs along the path of the Patuxent River, just south of Maryland Route 32.
