= List of trails in Brevard County, Florida =

The following is a list of recreational trails in Brevard County, Florida. This list includes hiking, biking, equestrian, nature, and multi-use trails administered by various federal, state, county, and city agencies.

== Trails ==
Trail Name	Location	Description	Trailhead(s)
Ais Trail Park	Palm Bay	A 0.7 miles (1.1 km) unpaved nature trail with a boardwalk and an overlook of Turkey Creek.	28°01′56.6″N 80°35′17.8″W
Barrier Island Sanctuary Trail	South Beaches	A 1.0 mile (1.6 km) unpaved nature trail loop across the street from EEL Nature Center. Parking at Bonsteel Park on Mondays when the center is closed. Great Florida Birding Trail Site. Brochure/Trail Map	27°54′09.4″N 80°28′19.0″W
Blue Heron Wetlands Trails	Titusville	A 2.8 miles (4.5 km) perimeter road around the water treatment plant. Vehicles are allowed on the dike, stop at the first building to sign in. Great Florida Birding Trail Site	28°32′35.6″N 80°51′36.7″W
Boundary Canal Trail	Palm Bay	A 1.5 miles (2.4 km) paved multi-use trail along a drainage canal with views of back yards on the north side and scrub sanctuary on the south side of the trail. The trail passes the Cameron Preserve, Malabar Scrub Sanctuary and connects to the new section of the South Brevard Linear Trail.	28°00′54.4″N 80°35′37.6″W
Bracco Pond Reservoir Trail	Cocoa	Located near the Jerry Sellers Water Reclamation Facility are 2.3 miles (3.7 km) of paved multi-use trails within 57.43 acres (23.24 ha) of uplands. Parking is available at the Crestview Dr. and Plaza Pkwy trailheads.	28°22′23.8″N 80°44′24.6″W Crestview Drive; 28°22′11.0″N 80°44′33.0″W Fiske Blvd; 28°22′00.0″N 80°44′17.2″W Plaza Pkwy
Brevard Museum Nature Trails	Cocoa	Three different nature trails just north of the BCC Cocoa campus in a 22 acres (8.9 ha) preserve. The Trails are only open when the Museum is open and no is fee required for walking the trails.	28°23′14.8″N 80°45′35.0″W
Brevard Zoo Linear Park Trail	Viera	The Brevard Zoo Linear Park trail is 3.5 miles (5.6 km) long and runs from the Zoo to the north end of Turtle Mound Road. A 1 mile (1.6 km) section of a 10 feet (3.0 m) wide boardwalk was completed first.	28°13′18.6″N 80°42′51.1″W
Buck Lake Conservation Area	Mims	This property has 12 miles (19 km) of hiking trails. Trail Map WMA Brochure Great Florida Birding Trail Site. Caution: Hunting is permitted. Note: The Western Trailheads are in Volusia County.	28°40′10.0″N 80°53′25.4″W East 28°40′19.5″N 80°58′17.8″W West; 28°42′43.8″N 81°01′11.6″W Morgan Alderman Road
Cameron Reserve Trails	Malabar	This 100 acres (40 ha) preserve has several unmarked unpaved hiking and biking trails. The Yellow Connector Trail between the Malabar Sanctuaries run along the north edge of the property.	28°00′32.2″N 80°35′21.7″W
Canaveral Marshes Trails	Titusville	Several trails/roads in the 6,741 acres (2,728 ha) Canaveral Marshes Conservation Area. The Florida Trail Association maintains about 5 miles (8.0 km) of the trails on this property. Blue, red, and white blaze trails. Trail Map	28°32′39.6″N 80°53′47.5″W
Chain of Lakes Regional Park	Titusville	3 miles (4.8 km) of paved walking trails with a bird watching tower near BCC Titusville campus. Great Florida Birding Trail Site.	28°38′40.7″N 80°49′23.1″W
City of Titusville Multi-use Trail (a.k.a. Wuesthoff Trail)	Titusville	A 10 feet (3.0 m) wide urban trail that runs 1.8 miles (2.9 km) from the southwest corner of Wuesthoff Park to Imperial Estates Elementary School	28°33′12.8″N 80°49′34.6″W Worth Ave 28°32′35.0″N 80°48′48.2″W Kathy Dr.
Coconut Point Sanctuary Trail	South Beaches	A 0.75 miles (1.21 km) unpaved, well marked nature trail with an overlook of Indian River Lagoon. The two trailheads are on A1A. The northern trailhead is across the street from the Juan Ponce de León Beach Park where parking is available. Great Florida Birding Trail Site.	28°00′42.4″N 80°31′52.2″W
Cruickshank Sanctuary	Rockledge	A one-mile nature trail, not to be confused with the Cruickshank trail in the Merritt Island National Wildlife Refuge. Brochure/Trail Map	28°17′37.7″N 80°42′26.3″W
Dicerandra Scrub Sanctuary	Titusville	Nature trails on 44 acres (18 ha) of EEL Sanctuary property.	28°33′6.4″N 80°48′39.1″W
East Central Regional Rail Trail (ECRRT)	Titusville	14.8 miles (23.8 km) of this 51 miles (82 km) rail-trail are in Brevard County. This trail runs along the inactive Florida East Coast (FEC) rail line from Titusville to Enterprise and Maytown to Edgewater in Volusia County. The section in Brevard has been completed.	28°36′48.5″N 80°48′43.5″W South Endpoint 28°43′43.8″N 80°53′19.4″W Aurantia Rd TH
Enchanted Forest Trails	Titusville	Several hiking trails (4.1 miles (6.6 km)) with boardwalks over wetlands in the Enchanted Forest Sanctuary. Brochure Trail Map Great Florida Birding Trail Site.	28°32′0.1″N 80°48′9.0″W
Erna Nixon Park Trail	Melbourne	A 0.5 miles (0.80 km) boardwalk nature trail. Great Florida Birding Trail Site.	28°05′27.3″N 80°39′21.4″W
Fay Lake Wilderness Area Trail	Port St. John	There is a 1.5 miles (2.4 km) trail around the property line.	28°27′42.4″N 80°50′4.0″W
F. Burton Smith Regional Park	Cocoa	Two nature trails: Botanical (.25 miles (0.40 km)) and Woodland (1 mile (1.6 km))	28°21′55.2″N 80°51′27.6″W
F.I.T. Botanical Garden Trail (a.k.a. Joy & Gordon Patterson Botanical Garden)	Melbourne	Paved nature trail in the Florida Tech Campus.	28°04′1.0″N 80°37′24.5″W
Fox Lake Sanctuary Trail	Titusville	There are over 7 miles (11 km) of trails are available for hiking, the trailhead is located in Fox Lake Park. Trail Map	28°35′18.7″N 80°52′29.6″W
Grant Flatwoods Sanctuary Trails	Grant	Currently only one marked trail exists, the 1.83 mile Red Loop trail. Two additional trails are planned: A 2.5 mile extension trail (which can be accessed from the red loop trail) and will connect via a proposed bridge across Sottile Canal to a 4-mile loop trail. The trailhead is located at the end of Crepe Myrtle Road.	27°54′06.0″N 80°32′59.5″W
Indian Mound Station Sanctuary Trail	Mims	This sanctuary has 1.2 miles of trails under development. Access is from Holder Park.	28°39′19.5″N 80°51′32.7″W
Island Pioneer Trail	Merritt Island	A 1.1 miles (1.8 km) paved multi-use trail located between the Kings Park parking area and Hall Road through wooded areas surrounded by canals and ponds. A short boardwalk crosses a wet area. Note: This trail may be labeled as the George Hamilton Trail on some maps.	28°26′50.9″N 80°41′37.9″W Kings Park 28°26′04.4″N 80°41′39.8″W Hall Rd.
Jordan Scrub Sanctuary Trails	Malabar	There are three designated nature trails in this sanctuary: Trail Map: A 3.4 miles (5.5 km) White Loop Trail.; A 0.5 miles (0.80 km) Yellow Connector Trail to the Jordon Blvd. Trailhead.; A 0.75 miles (1.21 km) Blue Trail to the SW corner of the sanctuary.	27°59′12.3″N 80°34′22.9″W Marie St. 27°59′01.0″N 80°33′30.5″W Jordon Blvd.
Kabboord Sanctuary Trail	Merritt Island	Approximately 5 miles (8.0 km) of overgrown road.	28°26′03.3″N 80°41′46.9″W
Lori Wilson Park	Cocoa Beach	A 0.6 miles (0.97 km) nature boardwalk thru a hammock on a 32.43 acres (13.12 ha) regional beach park. Great Florida Birding Trail Site.	28°20′09.7″N 80°36′28.8″W
Malabar Scrub Sanctuary Trails	Malabar	There are several trails in the sanctuary: Red Loop 2.75 miles (4.43 km) unpaved hiking trail.; White 1.0 mile (1.6 km) unpaved hiking trail.; Blue .75 miles (1.21 km) paved exercise trail.; Al Tuttle .9 miles (1.4 km) paved multi-use trail runs along the eastern edge of the sanctuary.; Great Florida Birding Trail Site. Trail Map:	28°00′07.1″N 80°34′55.2″W Malabar Park; 28°00′16.3″N 80°35′7.0″W Oak Harbour Lane; 28°00′16.3″N 80°35′7.0″W Trailhead Park
Malabar Scrub Sanctuary (West) Trails (a.k.a. Brook Hollow Trails)	Malabar	There are several unpaved hiking trails: The Red Trail Loop is 1.5 miles (2.4 km) long and provides access to the east end of the Blue Trail and south end of the Turkey Creek MBT.; The Blue Trail Loop is 2 miles (3.2 km) long.; A .9 miles (1.4 km) Yellow Connector Trail through the Cameron Reserve to Malabar Scrub Trail Map	28°00′38.3″N 80°35′47.8″W Red Trail; 28°00′09.1″N 80°36′05.9″W Blue Trail, Englar Ave. 28°00′22.5″N 80°35′52.4″W Blue Trail, Pemberton Trail
Maritime Hammock Sanctuary Trail	South Beaches	A 2.5 miles (4.0 km) unpaved, well-marked, nature trail with an observation deck over a pond. There are two trailheads on A1A and another at the end of Pelican Drive. Parking is available on the A1A northern trailhead and at the beach access across from Mark's Landing entrance. Great Florida Birding Trail Site. Trail Map	27°57′22.7″N 80°30′10.1″W
Merritt Island Wildlife Refuge Trails	Titusville	The hiking trails in the Refuge are: Cruickshank Trail (5 miles (8.0 km)) has an observation tower.; Oak (.5 miles (0.80 km)) & Palm (2 miles (3.2 km)) Hammock Trails.; Nature Boardwalk at Visitors Center (.25 miles (0.40 km)).; Scrub Ridge Trail (1 mile (1.6 km)).; Black Point Wildlife Drive is a 7 miles (11 km) dike road loop, entrance fee scheduled to begin 9/1/2011.; Shiloh Marsh Trail is an 11 miles (18 km) dirt road along the Indian River Lagoon.; Pine Flatwoods Hiking Trail is a 1 mile (1.6 km) hiking loop. Note: An entrance fee is required. Great Florida Birding Trail Site.	28°40′42.4″N 80°46′18.6″W Cruickshank Trail; 28°38′38.7″N 80°42′59.6″W Oak & Palm Hammock Trails; 28°38′29.6″N 80°44′8.8″W Visitors Center; 28°41′42.2″N 80°42′57.7″W Scrub Trail; 28°39′27.0″N 80°45′16.2″W Black Point Wildlife Drive; 28°45′07.0″N 80°46′15.5″W Shiloh Marsh Trail; 28°46′11.1″N 80°47′11.9″W Pine Flatwoods Trail
Micco Scrub Sanctuary Trails	Micco	There are two unpaved trails in the sanctuary: Red Loop Trail is 5.0 miles (8.0 km) long.; White Loop Trail is 1.5 miles (2.4 km) long. Great Florida Birding Trail Site. Trail Map	27°52′27.5″N 80°36′51.0″W Micco Rd. 27°53′17.9″N 80°37′20.3″W Babcock St.
Moccasin Island Tract Trails	Viera	There are three hiking trails in this Conservation Area: White blaze trail: 2.5 miles (4.0 km) one way to observation tower overlooking Lake Winder.; Yellow blaze trail: 3.1 miles (5.0 km) one way to Oak Hammock Loop (Red Trail).; Red blaze trail loop: 2 miles (3.2 km) Caution: Hunting is permitted and livestock may be present. Trail Map	28°13′47.8″N 80°48′40.7″W
Palm Bay Cross City Trail (In progress)	Palm Bay	A proposed multi-use trail system along FP&L easement that traverses the city. The Phase 1 portion of .75 miles (1.21 km) paved multi-use trail within the FP&L easement from Malabar Road to Jupiter Elementary is now complete.	27°59′56.0″N 80°42′9.1″W
Palm Bay Regional Park Trails	Palm Bay	A paved multi-use sidewalk, also access to trails along canals.	27°59′57.4″N 80°43′46.2″W
Pine Island Trails	Merritt Island	Two hiking trails (1.3 miles (2.1 km) and 1.5 miles (2.4 km)) located in the Pine Island Conservation Area. Also a (2 miles (3.2 km) trail starting at Sams House. Brochure/Trail Map Great Florida Birding Trail Site.	28°29′33.4″N 80°43′18.6″W Pine Island; 28°28′23.6″N 80°43′6.5″W Sams House
Ritch Grissom Memorial Wetlands (Viera Wetlands)	Viera	3.5 miles (5.6 km) of dirt roads are around the wetlands and a central lake. Hiking & biking, cars are also permitted on the trail. Great Florida Birding Trail Site. Trail Map	28°13′43.1″N 80°45′37.5″W
Riverwalk Nature Center	Rockledge	This small park has a 915 ft. nature boardwalk.	28°16′5.4″N 80°41′24.2″W
Salt Lake Trail	Mims	There are several miles of roads in the Salt Lake Wildlife Management Area for hiking and horseback riding. Caution: Hunting is permitted. Great Florida Birding Trail Site. Trail Map	28°38′23.8″N 80°53′24.5″W Salt Lake Rd. 28°38′18.1″N 80°52′28.9″W Dairy Rd.
Samsons Island Trails	Satellite Beach	A 52 acres (21 ha) island in the Banana River, accessible only by boat, unpaved paths on island.	28°10′46.9″N 80°36′42.0″W
Satellite Beach Sports and Recreational Park Trail	Satellite Beach	A paved .7 miles (1.1 km) walking path around park, some unpaved paths through scrub on north end of the park.	28°09′36.4″N 80°35′46.6″W
Scottsmoor Sanctuary Trails	Scottsmoor	Several miles of unmarked roads in the sanctuary. Trails are currently under development, but open to the public. Parking is available at Parrish Park. Trail Map	28°45′51.6″N 80°52′53.1″W Parrish Park; 28°44′40.3″N 80°53′30.5″W Rose Marie St. 28°44′45.6″N 80°52′58.7″W International Ave. 28°45′4.68″N 80°52′23.0″W US 1
Scout Island Trail at Long Point Park	South Beaches	Some unpaved paths on this island. There is an entrance fee for Long Point Park.	27°52′23.5″N 80°28′18.8″W
Sebastian Inlet State Park Trails	South Beaches	This park has several trails. Great Florida Birding Trail Site.: Hammock Trail: A 1.0 mile (1.6 km) long Nature Trail.; Volkssport Trail: A 10 kilometres (6.2 mi) route that starts at the Inlet Marina Road.; There are three mountain bike trails (1) Old AlA Loop Trail - 1.2 miles (1.9 km)(2) Campbell's Cove Loop Trail -3.1 miles (5.0 km) (3) Long Point Loop Trail- 2.8 miles (4.5 km)	27°52′31.5″N 80°27′25″W Hammock Trail
Seminole Ranch Conservation Area Trails	Mims	Trails off Hatbill Road near Loughman Lake Lodge, observation tower/bridge to nowhere. Great Florida Birding Trail Site. Caution: Hunting is permitted. Trail Map	28°37′8.7″N 80°57′55.5″W
South Beach Mountain Bike Trail	South Beaches	A 1.1 miles (1.8 km) Bike/Hiking trail connecting Long Point Park and Sebastian Inlet Marina. Entrance fee of one dollar may apply.	27°52′31.2″N 80°28′4.6″W Northern; 27°52′28.5″N 80°27′35.0″W Southern
South Brevard Linear Trail (a.k.a. Al Tuttle Trail) (Proposed)	South Brevard	A planned 22 miles (35 km) contiguous multi-use path that will link Palm Bay's Boundary Canal Trail with Malabar, Valkaria, Grant and Micco. A .75 miles (1.21 km) segment from the east end of the Boundary Canal Trail to Malabar Road has been completed.	
South Lake Conservation Area Trail	Mims	2 miles (3.2 km) of hiking trails in this 155 acres (63 ha) of EEL managed property.	28°38′26.1″N 80°52′34.4″W
South Patrick Community Park	Satellite Beach	2,500 feet (760 m) of paved multi-use paths.	28°12′11.2″N 80°36′13.24″W
St. Sebastian River Preserve State Park	South Brevard	There are two main trails in the Brevard County portion of the preserve.: The Yellow Trail is a 9.7 miles (15.6 km) hiking/equestrian trail in the northeast parcel of the preserve.; The Green Trail is a 9.0 miles (14.5 km) hiking/equestrian trail in the northwest parcel of the preserve. Great Florida Birding Trail Site Brochure/Trail Map	27°49′57.1″N 80°33′29.2″W Yellow Trail; 27°49′28.8″N 80°36′24.2″W Green Trail
State Road A1A Trail (a.k.a. A1A Pedway)	South Beaches	A forty mile long multi-use paved path which is a component of the East Coast Greenway along A1A from Indialantic past Sebastian Inlet to Vero Beach. Note: There is no path across the bridge at Sebastian Inlet.	
Three Forks Marsh Trail	Palm Bay	A 16.9 miles (27.2 km) trail/road through the marsh. The south 2.4 miles (3.9 km) section of the trail from T. M. Goodwin WMA (C-54 Canal) provides access to an observation Tower Trail Map Caution: Hunting is permitted. Great Florida Birding Trail Site.	28°4′43.0″N 80°44′32.6″W US 192 Trailhead 27°58′59.9″N 80°45′14.9″W Lawton Rec Area; 27°49′37.9″N 80°42′31.4″W Fellsmere Grade
Turkey Creek Sanctuary Trails	Palm Bay	A 1.25 miles (2.01 km) Boardwalk, 1.5 miles (2.4 km) jogging trail, and a 1.1 miles (1.8 km) exercise trail. Great Florida Birding Trail Site.	28°01′0.5″N 80°36′15.5″W
Turkey Creek MBT (a.k.a. Ho Chi Mihn Trail)	Palm Bay	The 0.7 miles (1.1 km) unpaved Mountain Bike Trail (MBT) loop runs along Turkey Creek. Note: One way for mountain bikers.	28°00′54.3″N 80°35′44.1″W
Turnbull Hammock Trail	Scottsmoor	Approximately 2 miles (3.2 km) of dike road. Parking at Scottsmoor Landing. Great Florida Birding Trail Site.	28°46′14.3″N 80°50′45.3″W
Ulumay Wildlife Sanctuary	Merritt Island	A 436.5 acres (176.6 ha) bird reservation and sanctuary. The southbound trail section dead-ends in 0.6 miles (0.97 km) and the Northbound trail section passes an observation tower and ends in 3.2 miles (5.1 km) at SR 528.	28°22′14.4″N 80°40′59.0″W
Viera Park Pedways	Viera	Paved multi-use trails around this park.	28°14′54.8″N 80°43′42.9″W
Wickham Park Trails	Melbourne	Approximately eight miles of beginner single/doubletrack through pine flatwoods, hydric hammock, mesic hammock, xeric hammock, and sand pine scrub. Great Florida Birding Trail Site. North Section Trail Map South Section Trail Map	28°09′27.3″N 80°39′33.9″W
Wuesthoff Park	Titusville	A short boardwalk leads across the wetland from the rustic Homer Powell Nature Center to the half-mile trail.	28°33′21.3″N 80°49′31.7″W
