= Hiking in Connecticut =

Hiking in Connecticut consists of many individual and networked trails that include over 800 miles of Blue-Blazed Trails maintained and operated by the Connecticut Forest and Park Association. Connecticut also has a collection of nature walks that include historical American Indian trails and Underground Railroad trails that span the state. Amongst the most notable designations is the New England National Scenic Trail which consists of Mattabesett Trail and Metacomet Trail of Connecticut and the Metacomet-Monadnock Trail which runs from Massachusetts and into New Hampshire.
