= Thorne Head Preserve =

Coordinates: 43.947°N 69.821°W

Thorne Head Preserve is a 96-acre (39 ha) property administered by Kennebec Estuary Land Trust (KELT), located at the extreme end of High Street in north Bath, Maine, which includes half a mile of shoreline alongside Whiskeag Creek and the Kennebec River. The land was purchased in 2000.

The wildlife and nature preserve forms one end of the Whiskeag Trail and as such provides a trailhead kiosk with maps and rules and parking for about a dozen vehicles although there are no toilet or picnic facilities. The Preserve is open to the public free of charge from dawn till dusk daily.

== History ==
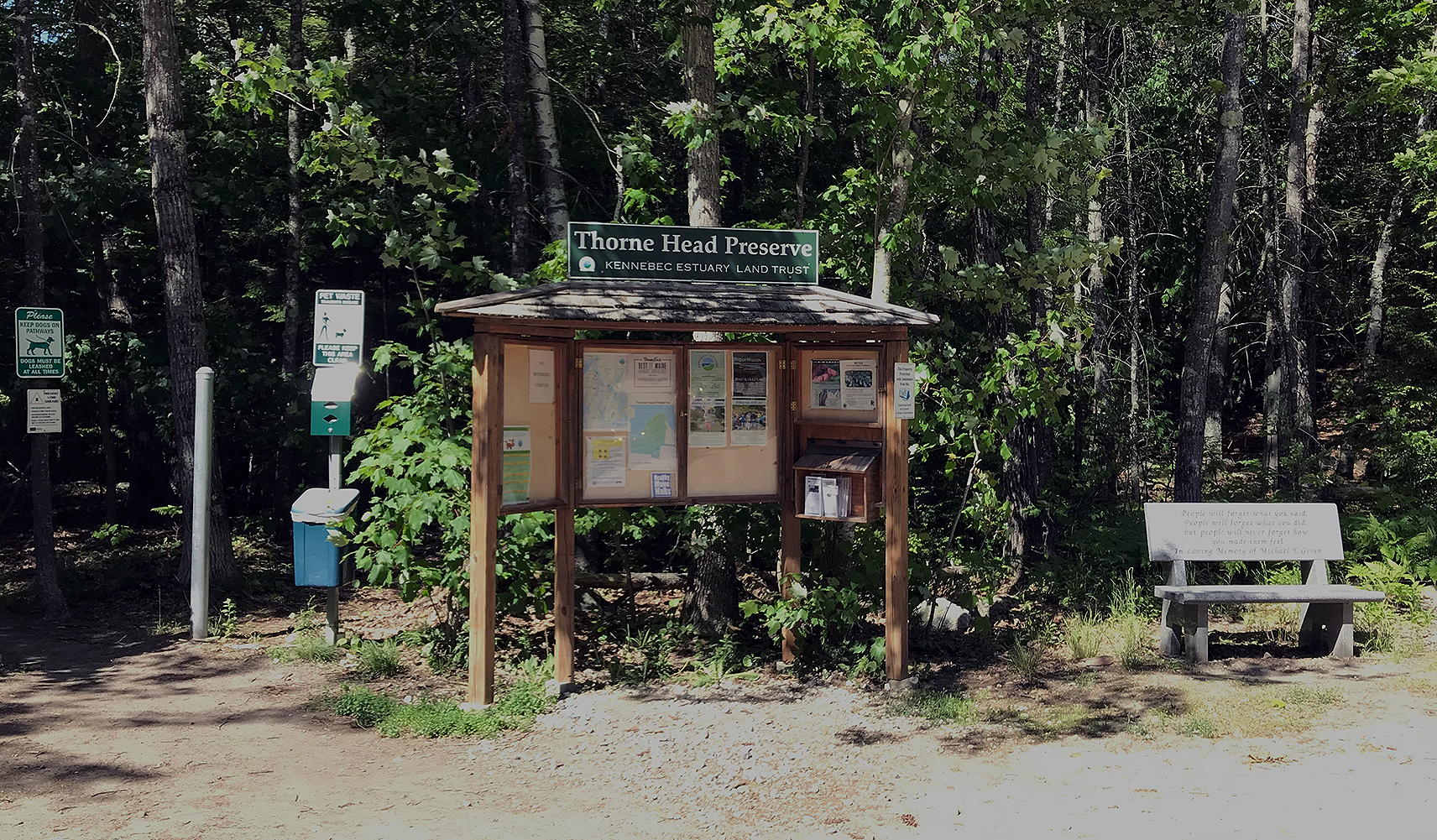
Kennebec Estuary Land Trust (KELT) kiosk at the trailhead and parking lot of Thorne Head Preserve

There is evidence that Thorne Head has been occupied and utilized since the Abenaki traded along the river and gathered wild rice there and was known to European settlers as early as 1605, when George Waymouth entered the Kennebec River with 'some noblemen of England' and 'traversed as far to the north as the Whizgig River' (the name referring to a whirling stream now refers to the Whiskeag Creek, which itself is said to derive from a native name, Kowasskik or Weskeag meaning 'Grassy River').

In 1640, land was deeded to the first European settlers, and from here white pine logs were exported back to England to provide wood for shipbuilding the King's Navy. Thorne Head continued to be logged into the 20th century and then the cleared areas became grazing pasture. Stone wall boundaries marking these pastures can still be seen today.

In 1751 Michael Thornton was the first resident to locate to Thorne Head and in 1752 the post road that led from Boston via Portland and Brunswick and along what is now High Street was extended through onto the first Kennebec River ferry where it crossed the river at the Narrows. The area known as Thorne Head has also been known as Thorn's Head as recently as 1906.

In 1993, the Maine Department of Inland Fisheries & Wildlife performed a critical habitat survey and noted Thorne Head as a high value habitat. In 1998, KELT began the process of purchasing the property and in April 2000 Thorne Head Preserve officially opened and became part of the Whiskeag Trail. In 2004 a gift of over 60 acres (24 hectares) - an area known as Sewall Woods, the woodlot adjacent to the Sewall family's dairy farm - was made to the trust by William D. Sewall. This in turn was enlarged in 2006 by the purchase of a further 26 acres (10.5 hectares) from Bath Housing Authority.

== Flora and fauna ==
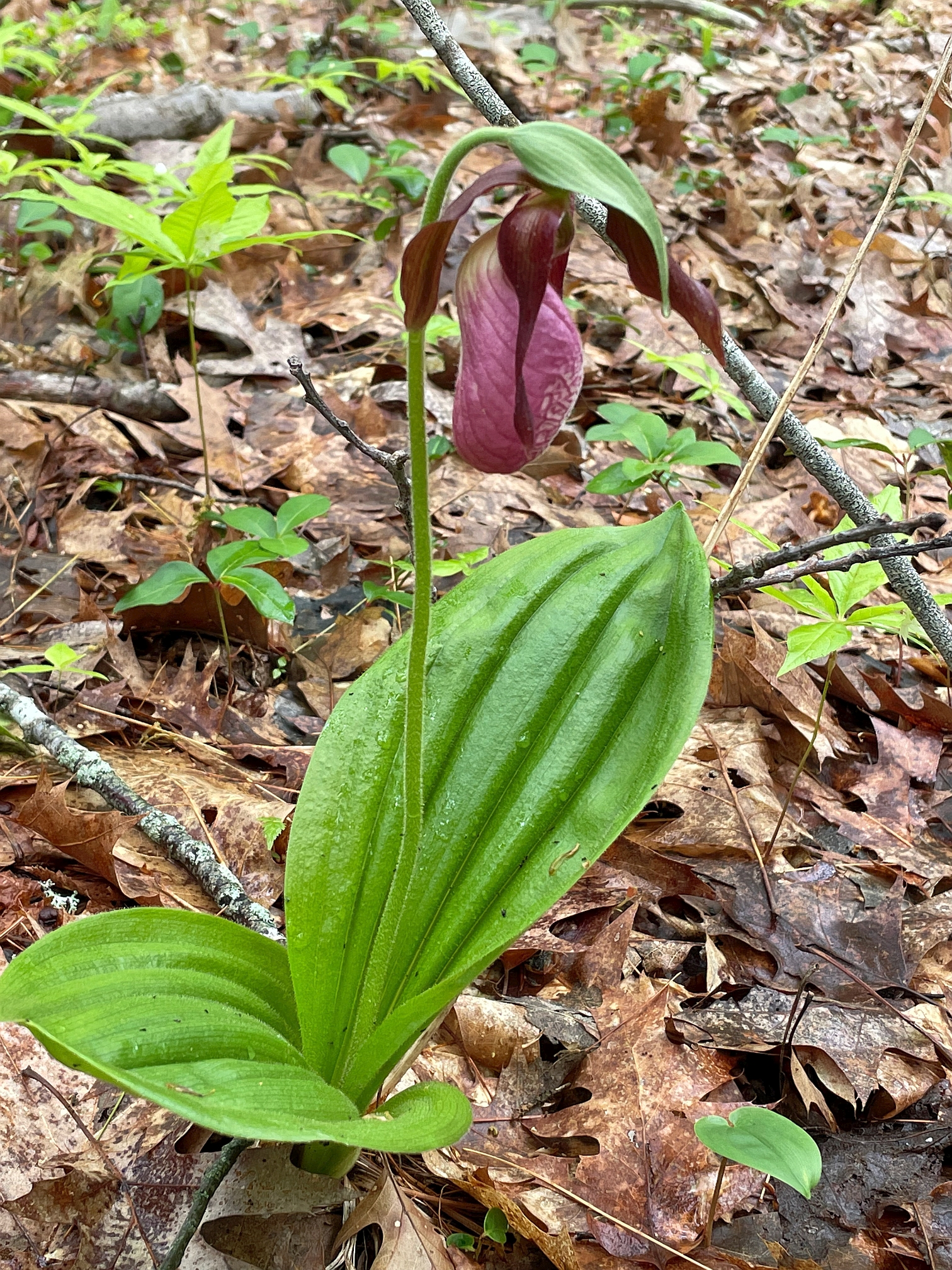
Lady slipper orchid (Cypripedium acaule) photographed in late May

On October 29, 2017, a large storm crossed Maine causing widespread damage. Thorne Head did not escape this storm and many trees were broken or felled as a result. Many trees had to be removed from the public trails in the following week. The damage caused large openings to appear in what was dense woodland meaning that many of the trails are far more exposed than they were previously.

The preserve contains mixed forest which includes specimens of white pine (Pinus strobus), red pine (Pinus resinosa); a stand of which can be found at the northern end of the preserve, and eastern hemlock (Tsuga canadensis). It is possible to also find examples of oak and maple.

The slipper orchid (Cypripedium acaule), commonly known as the "lady's slipper orchid", is also found on the preserve in May and June.

The preserve protects over half a mile (0.8 km) of shoreline on both the Kennebec River and Whiskeag Creek. Many fish species live in the waters here including striped bass and short-nosed sturgeon.

It is possible on the trails to see deer, fox, raccoons and mink as well as various wild birds such as owls, bald eagles and migrating warblers. There are several vernal pools located throughout the preserve, containing wood frogs (Lithobates sylvaticus) and the blue-spotted salamander (Ambystoma laterale), both of which are considered to be 'obligate' species.

Holes can be seen in many dead trees which were likely made by the pileated woodpecker. This is the largest woodpecker in Maine, averaging 16 to 19 inches. It is a year-round resident and its favorite food is carpenter ants. The Pileated's drumming sounds are louder than the drumming of the smaller hairy woodpecker (9-13 inches in length) and the even smaller downy woodpecker (5-7 inches).

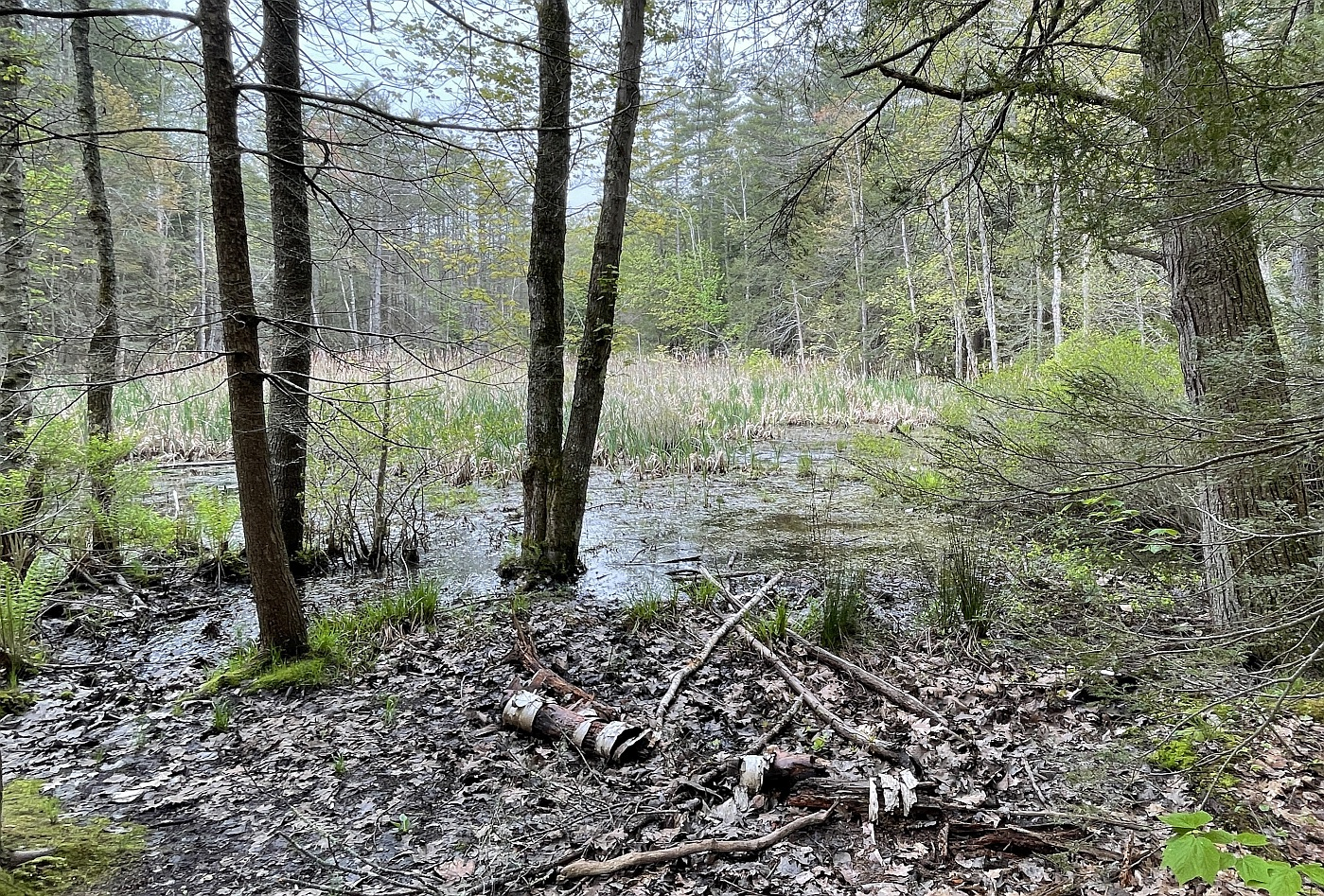
Vernal pool close to the entrance of Thorne Head Preserve

== Walking trails ==
There are approximately 3.5 miles (5.6 km) of trails to explore. The trails are marked with colored paint blazes on the trees. There are usually paper maps available from the kiosk at the entrance to the Preserve. From the entrance it is possible to take either of two trails: the Overlook Trail or the 5.1 mile Whiskeag Trail. Bath Gardening Club has placed signs throughout the preserve identifying various tree and plant species. The terrain of the Preserve is varied. On most trails the elevation is gentle and the trails are easy to follow. Along the shoreline, the terrain drops off steeply. Underfoot, the trails are a mixture of dirt/forest floor, and gravel.

=== Overlook Trail ===
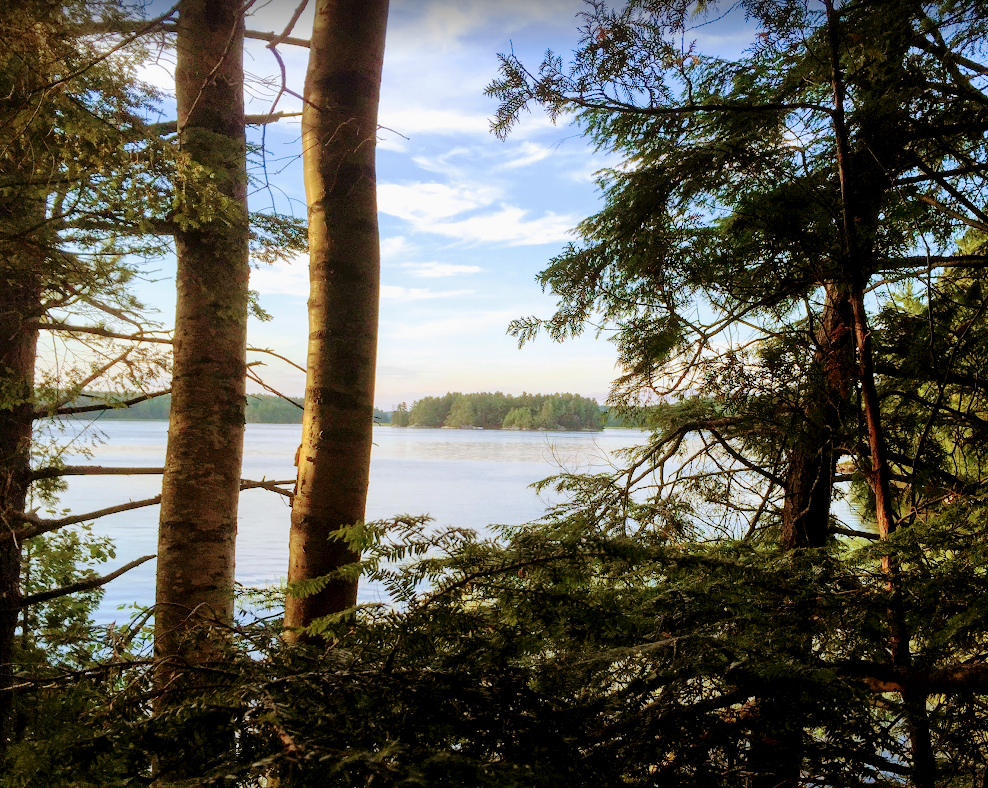
A view of the Whiskeag Creek from the Narrows Trail

The Overlook Trail runs roughly north from the trailhead and ends at the 'Mushroom Cap', a stone sculpture approximately a 10-minute walk (0.5 miles/0.8 km). This trail intersects at various points with The Narrows Trail, The Ridge Runner Trail, The Old Ferry Road Trail and the Mushroom Cap Trail. There are also two short connecting trails known as The Sunset Loop and The Pond Connector. This trail is wide, and constructed of crushed stone/gravel underfoot.

From The Narrows Trail, The Ridge Runner Trail and The Pond Connector Trail, it is possible to join the Whiskeag Trail.

=== The Ridge Runner Trail ===
The Ridge Runner Trail (0.5 miles/0.8 km) runs parallel to the west of Overlook Trail. It is narrower and more overgrown than the Overlook Trail and requires negotiating some stepped-rock, large tree roots and boulders.

=== The Narrows Trail ===
The Narrows Trail runs around the headland along the shore of the Whiskeag Creek. It has some steep climbs and narrow parts. It is 0.75 miles (1.2 km) in length and joins with the Whiskeag Trail at its westernmost end.

=== The Whiskeag Trail ===
The Whiskeag Trail, although not part of Thorne Head Preserve itself, is a 5 miles (8 km) biking and hiking trail that connects Thorne Head Preserve to the Bath Area Family YMCA.
