= Bath, Maine =

City in Maine, United States

- City
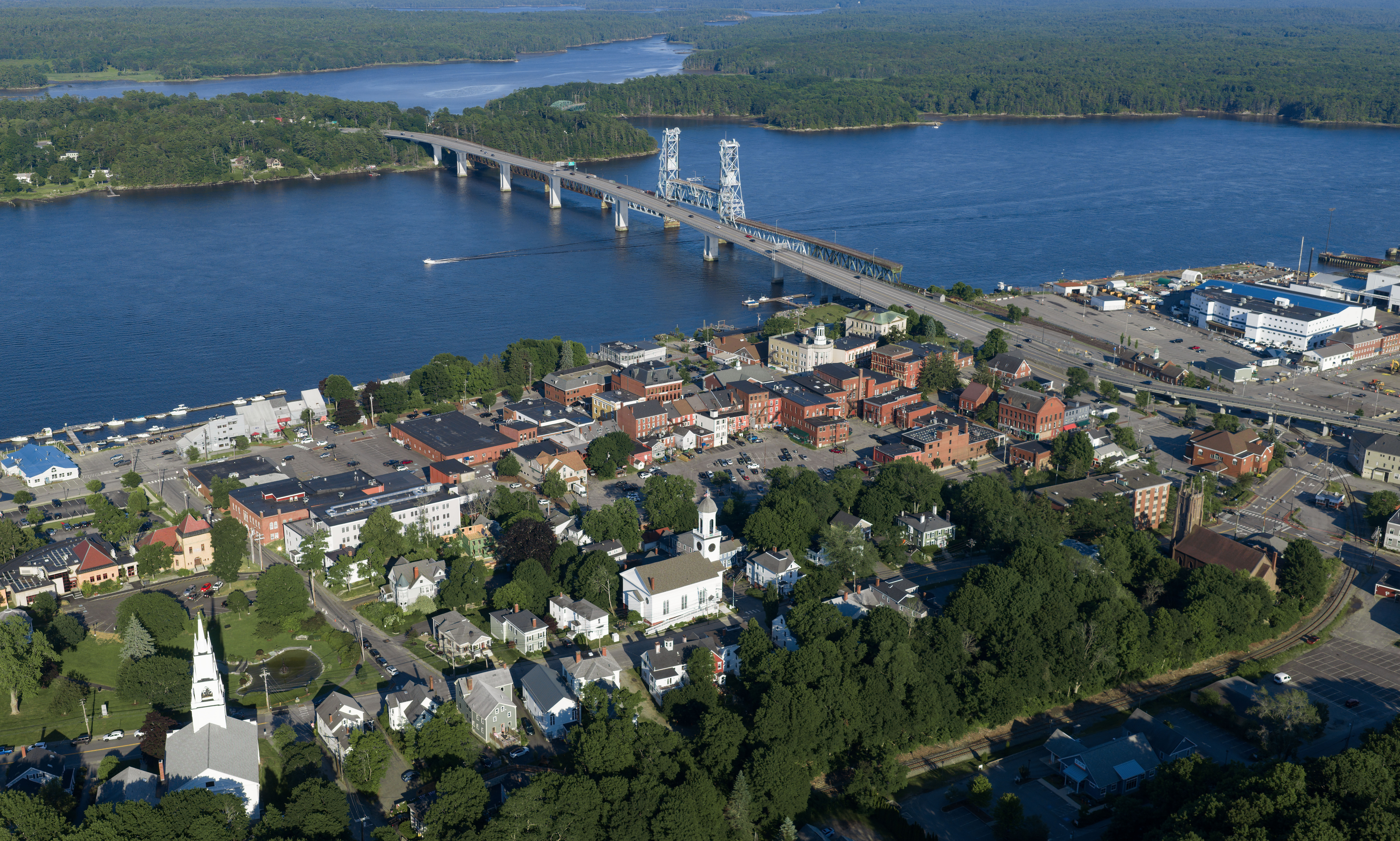
- Downtown, 2026

- Flag Seal Logo
- Nickname: City of Ships
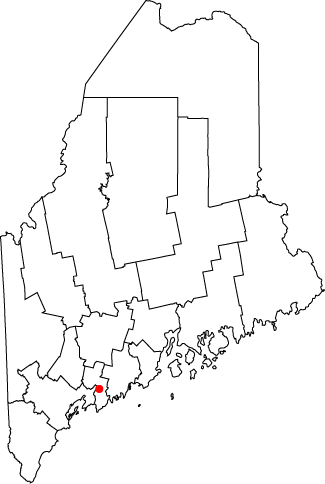
- Location of Bath in Maine
- Coordinates: 43°54′12″N 69°49′54″W
- Country: United States
- State: Maine
- County: Sagadahoc
- Incorporated (town): February 17, 1781
- Incorporated (city): June 14, 1847

Area
  - Total: 13.22 sq mi (34.23 km^{2})
  - Land: 9.12 sq mi (23.62 km^{2})
  - Water: 4.10 sq mi (10.61 km^{2})
- Elevation: 33 ft (10 m)

Population (2020)
  - Total: 8,766
  - Density: 961/sq mi (371.1/km^{2})
- Time zone: UTC−5 (Eastern (EST))
  - Summer (DST): UTC−4 (EDT)
- ZIP Code: 04530
- Area code: 207
- FIPS code: 23-03355
- GNIS feature ID: 582343
- Website: www.cityofbathmaine.gov

Bath is a city in and county seat of Sagadahoc County, Maine, United States. Bath had a 2024 population of 8,870. Bath is growing at a rate of 0.29% annually, and its population has increased by 1.21% since the most recent census, which recorded a population of 8,764 in 2020. The city is popular with tourists, many drawn by its 19th-century architecture. It is home to the Bath Iron Works and Heritage Days Festival, held annually during the Fourth of July weekend. It is commonly known as the "City of Ships" due to the number of sailing ships that were built in the Bath shipyards. Bath is part of the Portland-South Portland-Biddeford metropolitan statistical area.

== History ==
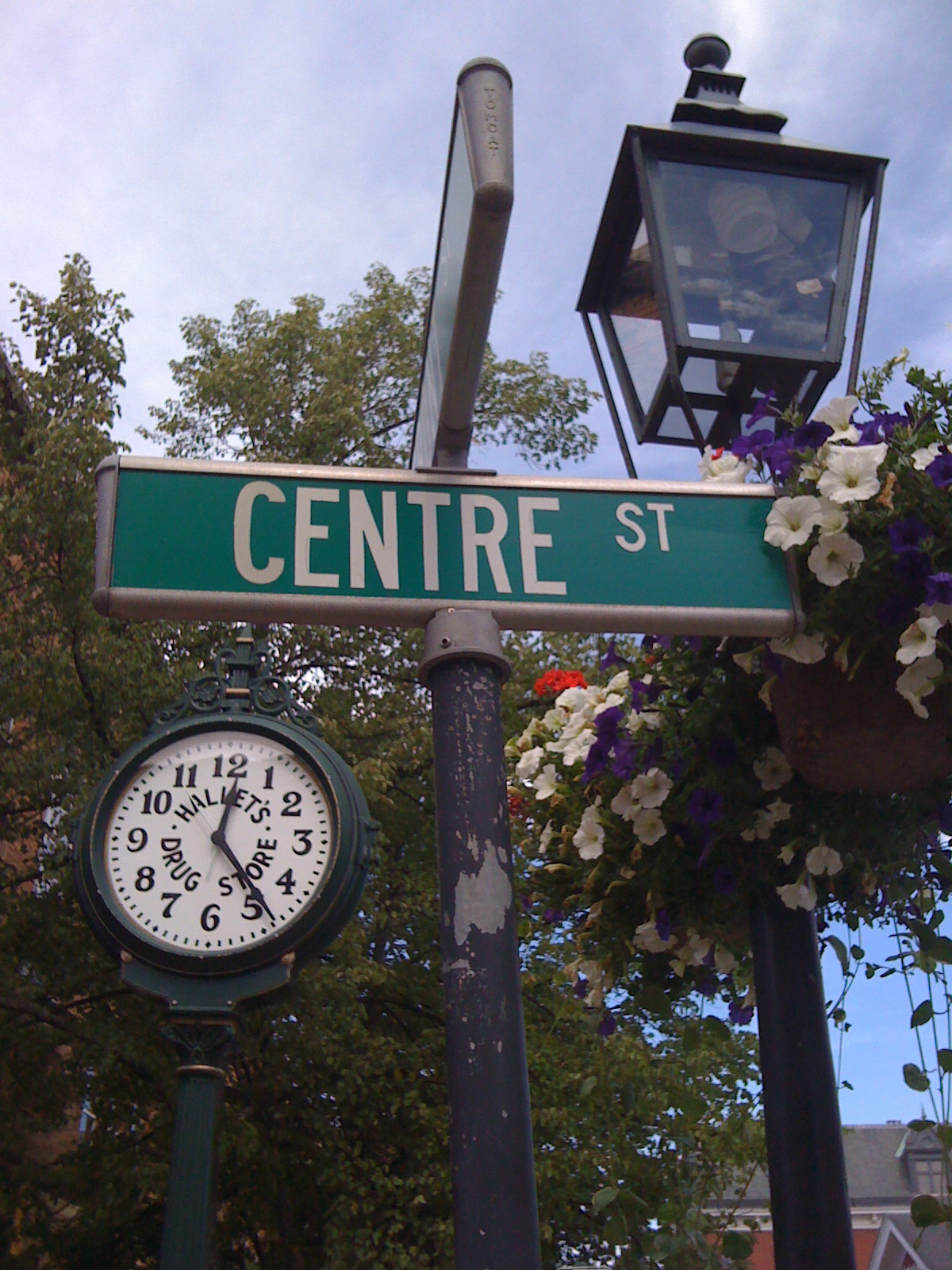
Street clock at Front and Centre Streets

Abenaki Indians called the area Sagadahoc, meaning "mouth of big river". It was a reference to the Kennebec River, which Samuel de Champlain explored in 1605. Popham Colony was established in 1607 downstream, together with Fort St George. The settlement failed due to harsh weather and lack of leadership, but the colonists built the New World's first oceangoing vessel constructed by English shipwrights, the Virginia of Sagadahoc. It provided passage back to England. Most of Bath, Maine, was settled by travelers from Bath, England.

The next settlement at Sagadahoc was around 1660, when the land was taken from an Indian sagamore known as Robinhood. Incorporated as part of Georgetown in 1753, Bath was set off and incorporated as a town on February 17, 1781. It was named by the postmaster, Dummer Sewall, after Bath in Somerset, England. In 1844, a portion of the town was set off to create West Bath. On June 14, 1847, Bath was incorporated as a city, and in 1854, designated county seat. Land was annexed from West Bath in 1855.

Several industries developed in Bath, including lumber, iron, and brass, with trade in ice and coal. The city and surrounding area are renowned for shipbuilding, an industry that began in 1743 when Jonathan Philbrook and his sons built two vessels. Since that time, roughly 5,000 vessels have been launched from Bath, which became the nation's fifth-largest seaport by the mid-19th century. At one point, the city was home to more than 200 shipbuilding firms. The clipper ships built in Bath sailed to ports around the world. The last commercial enterprise to build wooden ships in the city was the Percy & Small Shipyard, whose schooner Wyoming is considered the largest wooden ship in world history, and which was acquired for preservation in 1975 by the Maine Maritime Museum. The most well-known shipyard is the Bath Iron Works, which was founded in 1884 by Thomas W. Hyde, who became the firm's general manager in 1888. It has built hundreds of wooden and steel vessels, mostly warships for the U.S. Navy. During World War II, Bath Iron Works launched one new ship about every 17 days. The shipyard today is a major regional employer, and currently operates as a division of the General Dynamics Corporation.

In the Bath, Maine, anti-Catholic riot of 1854, an Irish Catholic church was burned.

The city is noted for its Federal, Greek Revival, and Italianate architecture, including the 1858 Custom House and Post Office designed by Ammi B. Young. Bath is a sister city to Shariki (now Tsugaru) in Japan, where the locally built full-rigged ship Cheseborough was wrecked in 1889. Scenes from the movies Message in a Bottle (1999) and The Man Without a Face (1993) were filmed in Bath.

In 1915, Fred Cox, owner of Hallet's Drug Store on Front Street, purchased the street clock standing at the corner of Front and Centre Streets from Boston, where it was built by Seth Thomas Clock Company four years earlier. It was moved from 70 Front Street to its current location in 1966, having been purchased by Harry Crooker. His family later donated it to the city, with the proviso that it be maintained and kept in a continuously operating condition, else it be returned to the family. The clock was restored in 2000. Crooker established local construction company in 1935. It was sold in 2014, after 79 years of family ownership.

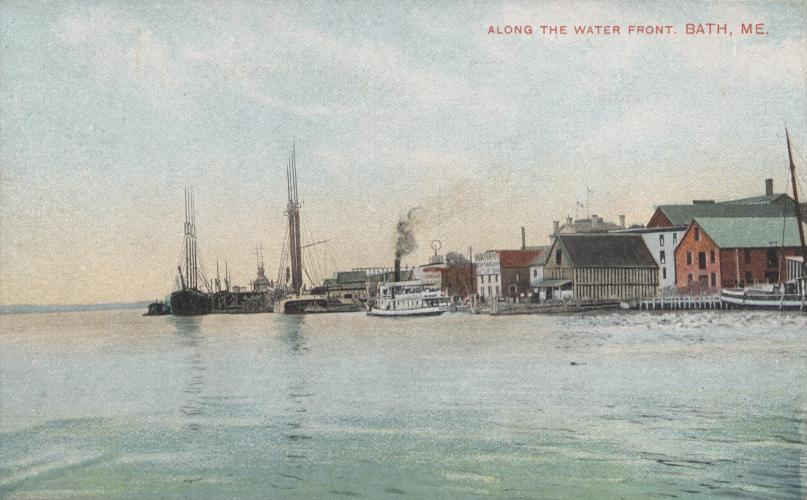
Waterfront (1907)

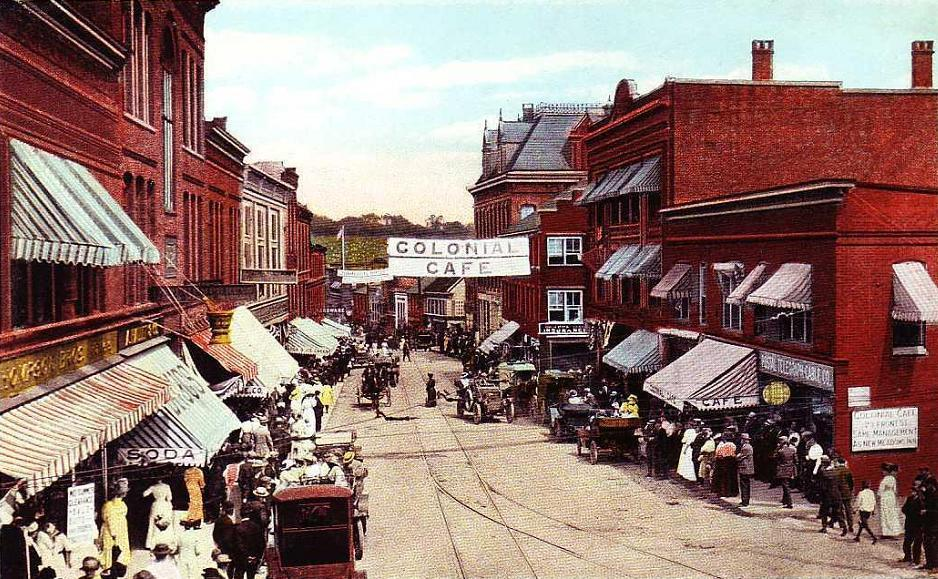
Front Street (c. 1920)

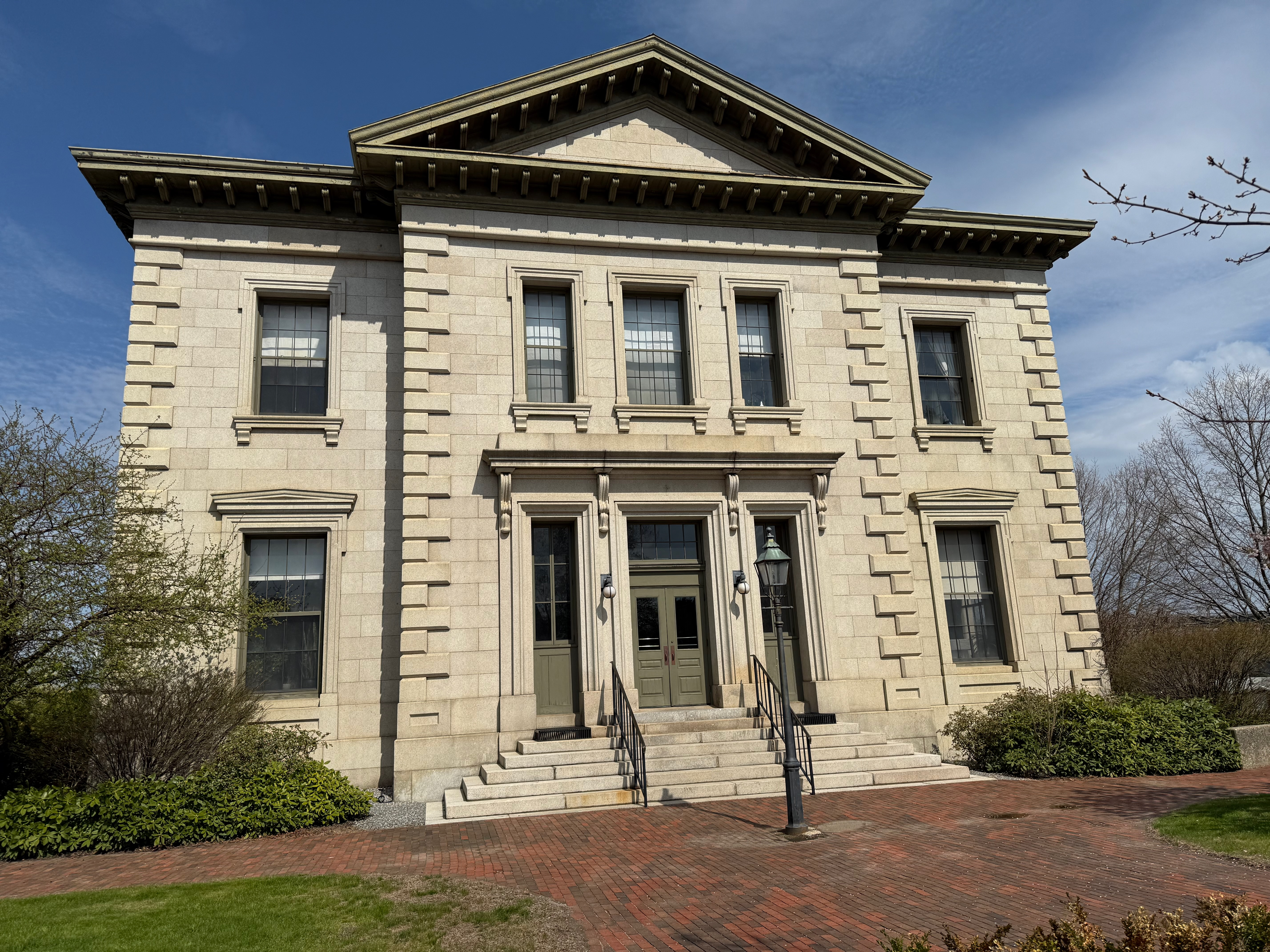
Custom House (2025)

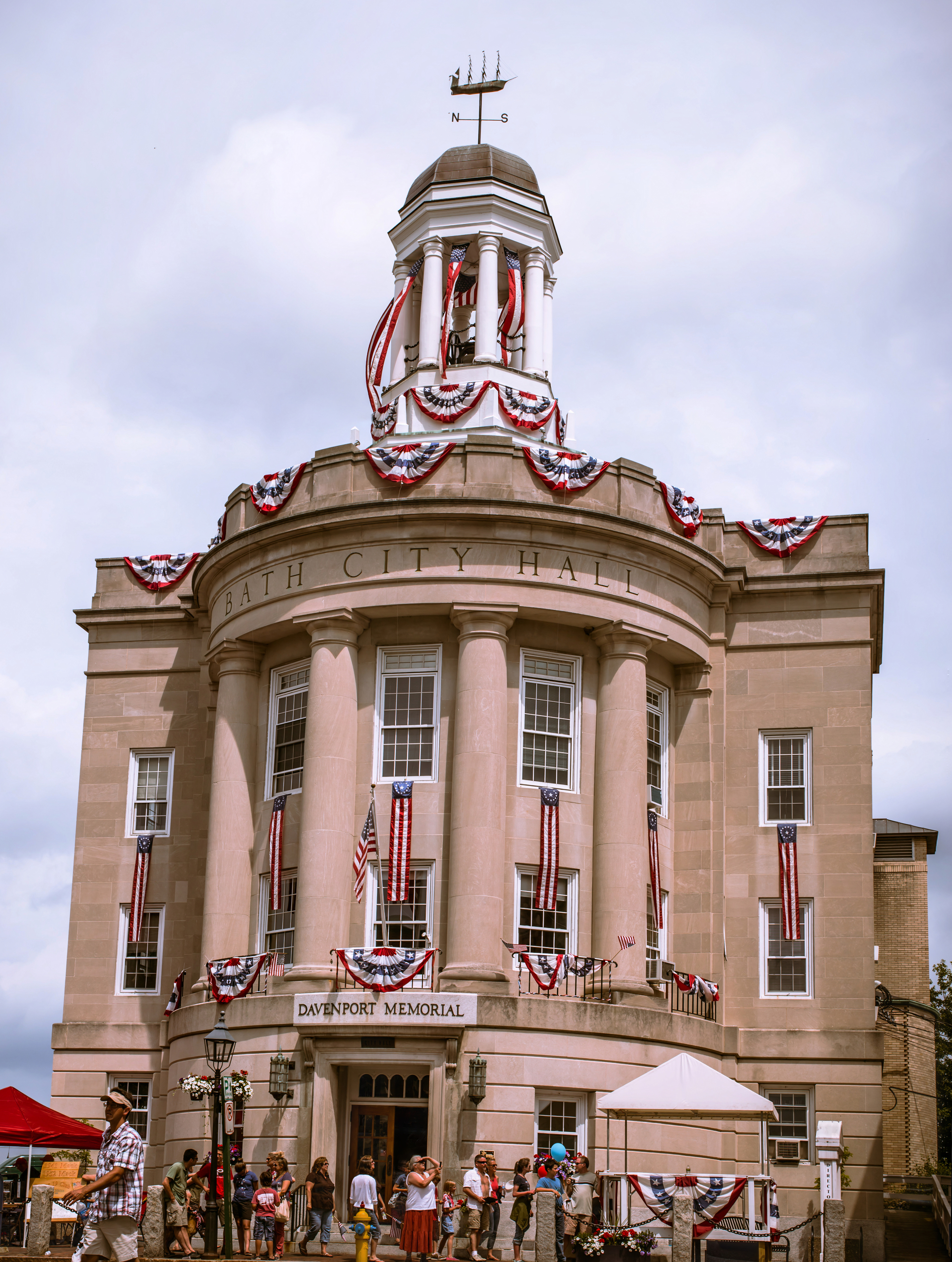
City Hall (2012)

== Geography ==
According to the United States Census Bureau, the city has a total area of 13.22 square miles (34.24 km^{2}), of which 4.12 sq mi (10.67 km^{2}) are covered by water.

== Greenspace ==
The city of Bath includes several nature preserves that are protected by the Kennebec Estuary Land Trust, including Thorne Head Preserve (located 2.1 miles north of Bath) and Butler Head Preserve (located 5.2 miles north of Bath). Also, numerous parks and walking trails are located throughout the town, such as the Whiskeag Trail.

== Demographics ==
Historical population
Census	Pop.	Note	%±
1790	949		—
1800	1,225		29.1%
1810	2,491		103.3%
1820	3,026		21.5%
1830	3,773		24.7%
1840	5,141		36.3%
1850	8,020		56.0%
1860	8,076		0.7%
1870	7,371		−8.7%
1880	7,874		6.8%
1890	8,723		10.8%
1900	10,477		20.1%
1910	9,396		−10.3%
1920	14,731		56.8%
1930	9,110		−38.2%
1940	10,235		12.3%
1950	10,644		4.0%
1960	10,717		0.7%
1970	9,679		−9.7%
1980	10,246		5.9%
1990	9,799		−4.4%
2000	9,266		−5.4%
2010	8,514		−8.1%
2020	8,766		3.0%

=== 2020 census ===
As of the 2020 census, Bath had a population of 8,766. The median age was 43.3 years. 18.3% of residents were under the age of 18 and 22.5% of residents were 65 years of age or older. For every 100 females there were 89.9 males, and for every 100 females age 18 and over there were 88.1 males age 18 and over.

88.2% of residents lived in urban areas, while 11.8% lived in rural areas.

There were 4,145 households in Bath, of which 23.3% had children under the age of 18 living in them. Of all households, 35.6% were married-couple households, 20.7% were households with a male householder and no spouse or partner present, and 33.2% were households with a female householder and no spouse or partner present. About 37.8% of all households were made up of individuals and 16.1% had someone living alone who was 65 years of age or older.

There were 4,535 housing units, of which 8.6% were vacant. The homeowner vacancy rate was 1.6% and the rental vacancy rate was 5.0%.

Racial composition as of the 2020 census
Race	Number	Percent
White	7,924	90.4%
Black or African American	162	1.8%
American Indian and Alaska Native	33	0.4%
Asian	65	0.7%
Native Hawaiian and Other Pacific Islander	0	0.0%
Some other race	56	0.6%
Two or more races	526	6.0%
Hispanic or Latino (of any race)	195	2.2%

=== 2010 census ===
As of the 2010 census, 8,514 people, 3,932 households, and 2,172 families were living in the city. The population density was 935.6 inhabitants per square mile (361.2/km^{2}). The 4,437 housing units had an average density of 487.6 per square mile (188.3/km^{2}). The racial makeup of the city was 95.1% White, 1.2% African American, 0.3% Native American, 0.6% Asian, 0.4% from other races, and 2.3% from two or more races. Hispanics or Latinos of any race were 1.8% of the population.

Of the 3,932 households, 27.5% had children under 18 living with them, 37.5% were married couples living together, 13.6% had a female householder with no husband present, 4.2% had a male householder with no wife present, and 44.8% were not families. About 36.1% of all households were made up of individuals, and 13.9% had someone living alone who was 65 or older. The average household size was 2.14 and the average family size was 2.79.

The median age in the city was 41 years; the age distribution was 22.2% under 18, 8.1% between 18 and 24, 24.7% from 25 to 44, 28.5% from 45 to 64, and 16.5% 65 or older. The gender makeup of the city was 46.7% male and 53.3% female.

=== 2000 census ===
As of the 2000 census, 9,266 people, 4,042 households, and 2,344 families were living in the city. The population density was 1,016.8 inhabitants per square mile (392.6/km^{2}). The 4,383 housing units had an average density of 481.0 per square mile (185.7/km^{2}). The racial makeup of the city was 94.92% White, 1.60% African American, 0.58% Native American, 0.47% Asian, 0.13% Pacific Islander, 0.68% from other races, and 1.62% from two or more races. Hispanics or Latinos of any race were 1.76% of the population.

Of the 4,042 households, 29.7% had children under 18 living with them, 40.8% were married couples living together, 13.1% had a female householder with no husband present, and 42.0% were not families; 34.1% of all households were made up of individuals and 13.0% had someone living alone who was 65or older. The average household size was 2.26 and the average family size was 2.91.

In the city, the age distribution was 25.0% under the age of 18, 8.4% from 18 to 24, 29.5% from 25 to 44, 23.0% from 45 to 64, and 14.1% who were 65 or older. The median age was 37 years. For every 100 females, there were 91.4 males. For every 100 females 18 and over, there were 86.9 males.

The median income for a household was $36,372 and for a family was $45,830. Males had a median income of $35,064 versus $22,439 for females. The per capita income for the city was $19,112. About 9.3% of families and 11.8% of the population were below the poverty line, including 17.5% of those under 18 and 9.6% of those 65 or over.

2013 Voter registration

Maine requires voters to register with a party to vote in primaries, also called a closed primary. However, voters are not required to register with a party to vote for their primary winners in the general election.

Voter Registration and Party Enrollment as of August 30, 2013
Party	Total Voters	Percentage
Unenrolled	2,425	36.93%
Democratic	2,275	34.64%
Republican	1,614	24.85%
Green Independent	252	3.83%
Total	6,566	100%

== Education ==
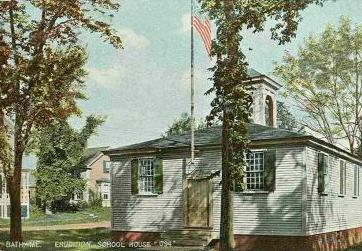
Erudition Schoolhouse (1794) in 1911

- RSU 1
  - Dike-Newell Elementary, kindergarten - grade 2
  - Fisher-Mitchell Elementary, grades 3–5
  - Bath Middle School – serves 430 students in grades 6–8 as of 2006. The school's mascot is the Destroyers, a type of ship built by the Bath Iron Works. The school colors are blue and white.
  - Morse High School – the Shipbuilders' sports include cross country, football, soccer, cheerleading, swimming, basketball, wrestling, tennis, indoor/outdoor track and field, lacrosse, softball, and baseball. Clubs include the International Club, Ambassadors Club, Debate Team, Math Team, and more. The school colors are blue and white. A new school building was completed in 2020, with students moving in during February 2021. Morse High School (previously Bath High School), which was founded in 1891, is believed to have the oldest active High School Alumni Association in the United States.
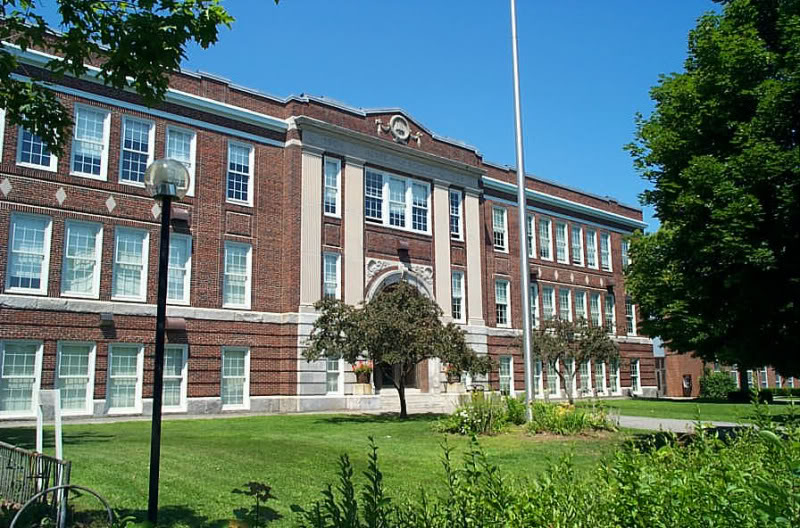
    Morse High School
- Hyde School, a college preparatory school, serves 149 students in grades 9–12 as of 2012. The school's mascot is the Wolfpack. The school colors are navy blue and gold.

=== Library ===
- Patten Free Library

== Sister city relations ==
- – Tsugaru, Aomori, Japan – Friendship City from 2006

== Climate ==
Bath has a humid continental climate (Köppen Dfb) with cold and snowy winters and mild summers. Precipitation is high the whole year, with a sizeable snow pack usually forming during winters. Compared to inland areas, winters are not severe, although colder than areas right on the ocean. Diurnal temperature variation is strong throughout the year. In winter, highs are around freezing, while lows in the single-digit Fahrenheit range are common.

Climate data for Bath, Maine, 1991–2020 normals, extremes 2000–present
Month	Jan	Feb	Mar	Apr	May	Jun	Jul	Aug	Sep	Oct	Nov	Dec	Year
Record high °F (°C)	59 (15)	65 (18)	79 (26)	81 (27)	92 (33)	95 (35)	97 (36)	96 (36)	93 (34)	85 (29)	76 (24)	67 (19)	97 (36)
Mean maximum °F (°C)	52.3 (11.3)	50.6 (10.3)	59.4 (15.2)	70.1 (21.2)	84.2 (29.0)	86.8 (30.4)	89.7 (32.1)	87.7 (30.9)	85.0 (29.4)	74.1 (23.4)	64.1 (17.8)	55.5 (13.1)	91.9 (33.3)
Mean daily maximum °F (°C)	31.1 (−0.5)	33.5 (0.8)	40.8 (4.9)	52.5 (11.4)	63.1 (17.3)	72.3 (22.4)	78.6 (25.9)	78.3 (25.7)	70.5 (21.4)	58.6 (14.8)	46.8 (8.2)	36.5 (2.5)	55.2 (12.9)
Daily mean °F (°C)	20.7 (−6.3)	21.5 (−5.8)	30.6 (−0.8)	41.8 (5.4)	52.0 (11.1)	61.7 (16.5)	68.0 (20.0)	66.9 (19.4)	59.3 (15.2)	48.0 (8.9)	37.2 (2.9)	27.1 (−2.7)	44.6 (7.0)
Mean daily minimum °F (°C)	10.3 (−12.1)	9.6 (−12.4)	20.4 (−6.4)	31.0 (−0.6)	40.9 (4.9)	51.0 (10.6)	57.4 (14.1)	55.5 (13.1)	48.2 (9.0)	37.5 (3.1)	27.6 (−2.4)	17.7 (−7.9)	33.9 (1.1)
Mean minimum °F (°C)	−9.5 (−23.1)	−7.4 (−21.9)	0.9 (−17.3)	20.5 (−6.4)	29.9 (−1.2)	40.7 (4.8)	48.6 (9.2)	45.4 (7.4)	34.2 (1.2)	25.4 (−3.7)	14.5 (−9.7)	0.8 (−17.3)	−13.5 (−25.3)
Record low °F (°C)	−23 (−31)	−22 (−30)	−12 (−24)	15 (−9)	25 (−4)	33 (1)	43 (6)	39 (4)	29 (−2)	18 (−8)	5 (−15)	−19 (−28)	−23 (−31)
Average precipitation inches (mm)	3.74 (95)	3.58 (91)	4.16 (106)	4.31 (109)	3.56 (90)	4.42 (112)	3.14 (80)	3.26 (83)	3.92 (100)	5.25 (133)	4.52 (115)	4.59 (117)	48.45 (1,231)
Average snowfall inches (cm)	20.0 (51)	18.8 (48)	13.4 (34)	3.0 (7.6)	0.0 (0.0)	0.0 (0.0)	0.0 (0.0)	0.0 (0.0)	0.0 (0.0)	0.1 (0.25)	2.5 (6.4)	14.0 (36)	71.8 (183.25)
Average extreme snow depth inches (cm)	14.5 (37)	16.7 (42)	12.6 (32)	3.1 (7.9)	0.0 (0.0)	0.0 (0.0)	0.0 (0.0)	0.0 (0.0)	0.0 (0.0)	0.1 (0.25)	2.0 (5.1)	8.9 (23)	20.0 (51)
Average precipitation days (≥ 0.01 inch)	12.2	10.1	11.3	11.5	12.6	11.7	11.2	9.5	9.5	11.4	11.1	13.0	135.1
Average snowy days (≥ 0.1 in)	8.1	6.4	4.8	1.3	0.0	0.0	0.0	0.0	0.0	0.1	1.5	5.9	28.1
Source 1: NOAA
Source 2: National Weather Service (mean maxima/minima, snow depth 2006–2020)

== Sites of interest ==
- Maine Maritime Museum
- Maine's First Ship
- Chocolate Church Arts Center
- Studio Theatre of Bath
- Midcoast Youth Center
- Bath Municipal Band
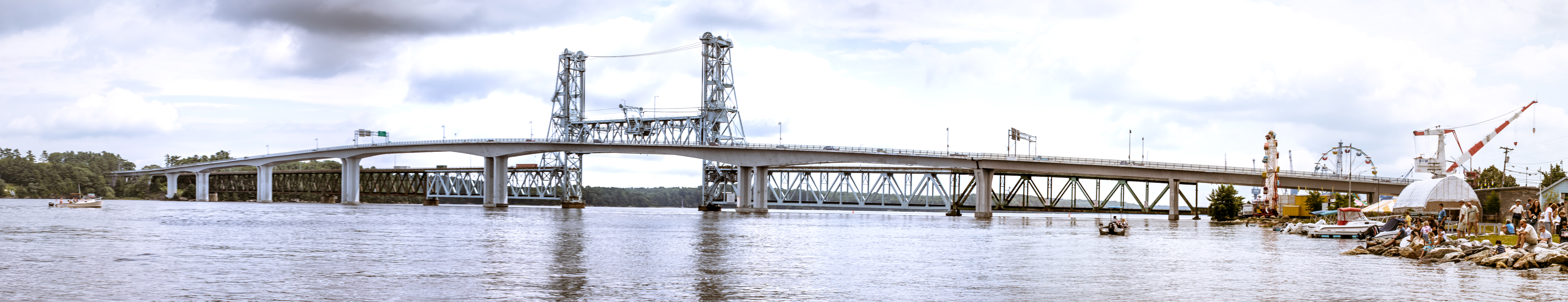
Panoramic view of Sagadahoc Bridge with the old train and elevated road bridge behind it during the Heritage Days festival, Bath, Maine, USA 2012
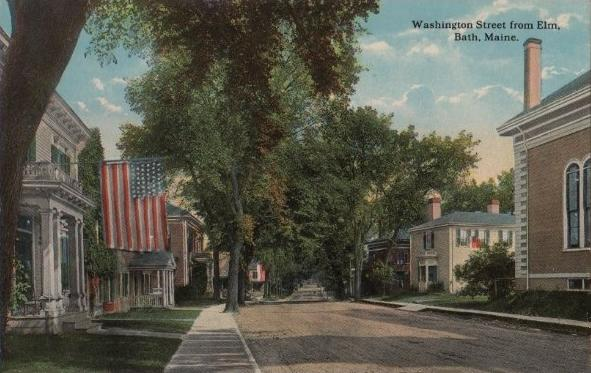
Washington Street in 1914

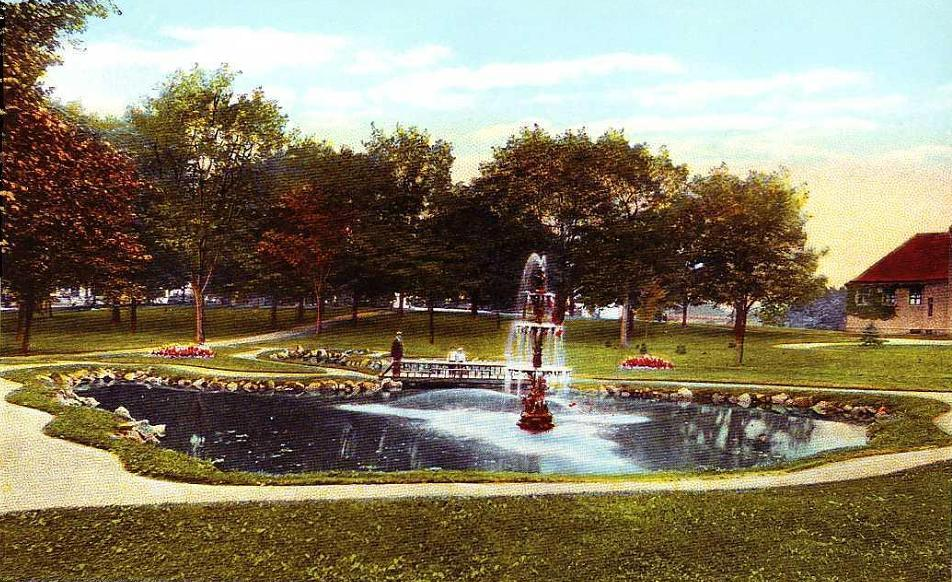
Library Park in 1917

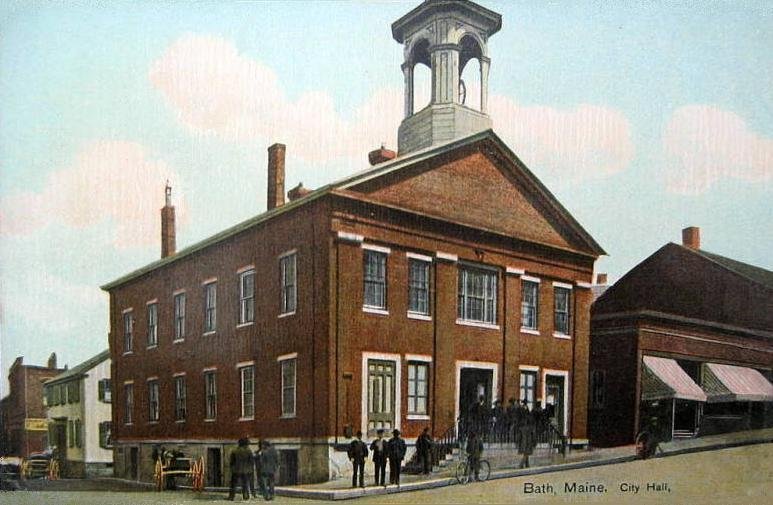
Old City Hall in 1909

=== Cemeteries ===
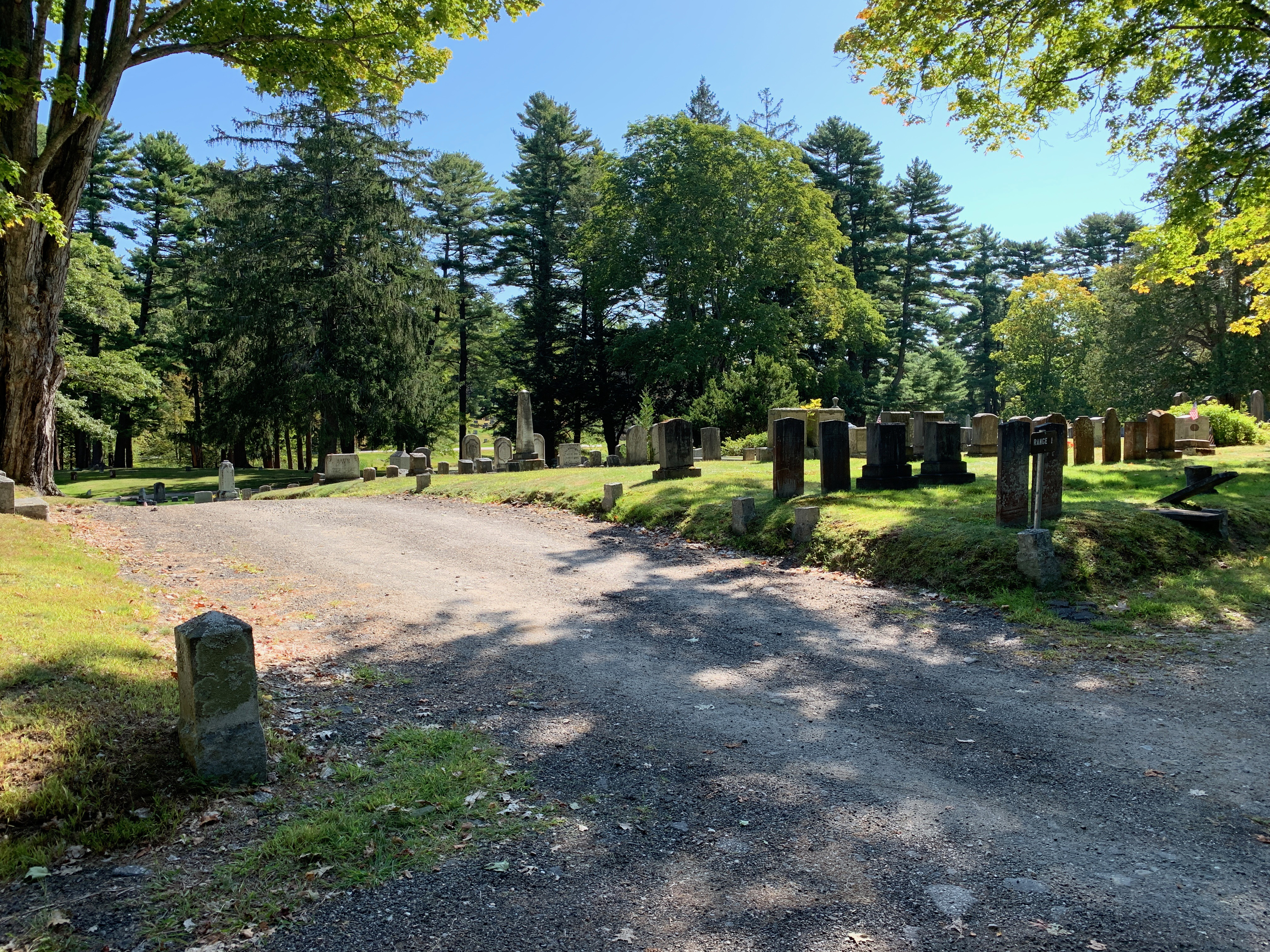
Oak Grove Cemetery and, across the street, Maple Grove Cemetery

Bath has twenty known cemeteries. This is a relatively small number compared to neighboring communities (Phippsburg, for example, has over one hundred), because, from the early 1900s, Bath was densely populated, which left less room for family cemeteries.

The city maintains these cemeteries: Oak Grove, Maple Grove, and Calvary. It also manages four smaller burials grounds: Dummer Sewall (Dummer and Beacon Streets), David Trufant (claimed by author Parker McCobb Reed in 1894 to be the oldest burying ground in Bath; Spring and Middle streets), Pettingill (Riverview Road) and Fairview (on Fairview Lane). Only Pettengill has pieces of stones remaining, including that of a Revolutionary War veteran.

Graveyards not managed by the city, which tend to be old family plots, include Harrison (Stoney Island Road), Crawford (North Bath Road), Roberts-Edgecomb (North Bath Road), Edgecomb (North Bath Road), Purington (North Bath and Whiskeag roads), Ham (Ridge and Whiskeag roads), Ward (Bayshore Road) and the "Irish" ground (Varney Mill Road).

The Whittam (or Witham) graveyard (Bayshore Road) and Wise-Welch (North Bath Road), which includes Bath's oldest documented burial in 1749, were identified in the 1970s, but are not found today.

Those found in sources, yet have no burials or exact locations identified, are South Street (possibly South and Washington Streets), Marshall (Washington and Marshall Streets), the "Turnpike" ground (likely in West Bath), and Marr's Hill (in the area of Corliss and Washington Streets). Also, a Ward Cemetery is known.
