= Seneca Creek Greenway Trail =

Hiking trail along Seneca Creek in Maryland

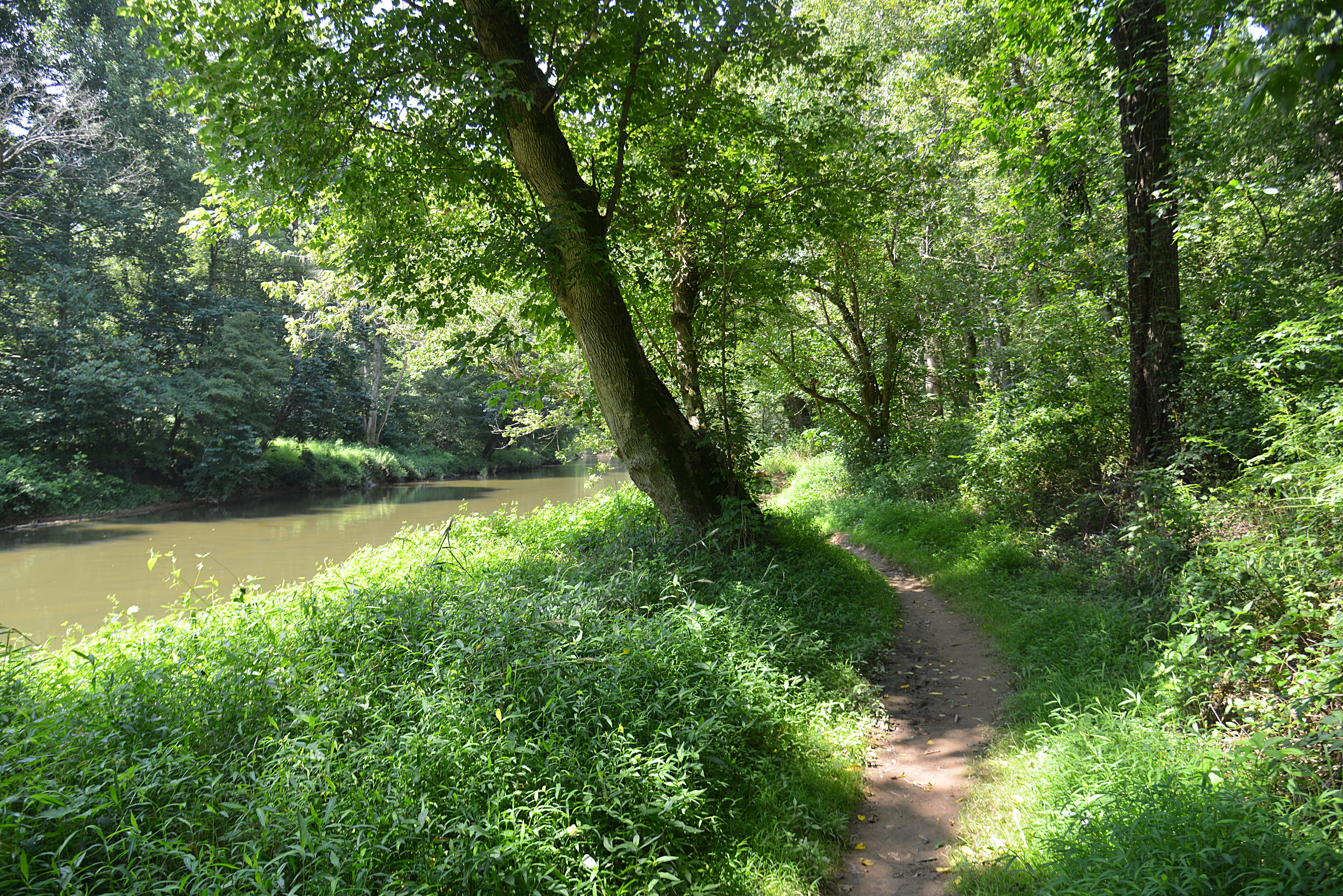
- Seneca Creek and the Seneca Creek Greenway trail near Berryville Road in Darnestown, MD
- Length: 24.2 mi (38.9 km)
- Location: Montgomery County, Maryland
- Trailheads: seneca stonecutting mill, Darnestown Road, Black Rock Mill, Riffle Ford Rd, Maryland Route 355, Watkins Mill Rd, Brink Rd, Davis Mill
- Surface: natural

The Seneca Creek Greenway Trail is a 24.2-mile (38.9 km) long trail that runs along Seneca Creek from the Potomac River to Watkins Road, with some parts maintained by the state of Maryland and some parts maintained by Montgomery County, MD

== State maintained section ==
The 16.5 mile state-maintained portion of the Seneca Creek Greenway Trail starts at the Potomac River near Riley's Lock. it goes by the ruins of the Seneca stonecutting mill and runs along Tschiffely Mill Road for about a mile. The trail then crosses River Road and goes a short distance on Berryville Road, where the off-road portion of the trail begins. The trail continues past Darnestown Road, Blackrock Mill and Clopper Lake until it reaches Maryland Route 355.

Trail sections
Mileage	Section
0.9 miles (1.4 km)	Potomac River to River Road
1.3 miles (2.1 km)	River Road to Berryville Road
2.2 miles (3.5 km)	Berryville Road to Berryville Road Side Trail
2.2 miles (3.5 km)	Berryville Road Side Trail to Route 28
1.4 miles (2.3 km)	Route 28 to Black Rock Mill
1.3 miles (2.1 km)	Black Rock Mill to Route 118
2.5 miles (4.0 km)	Route 118 to Riffle Ford Road
1.2 miles (1.9 km)	Riffle Ford Road to Seneca Creek State Park Road
1.1 miles (1.8 km)	Seneca Creek State Park Road to Clopper Road
2.3 miles (3.7 km)	Clopper Road to Route 355

Seneca Greenway Trail between the Potomac River and Maryland Route 355
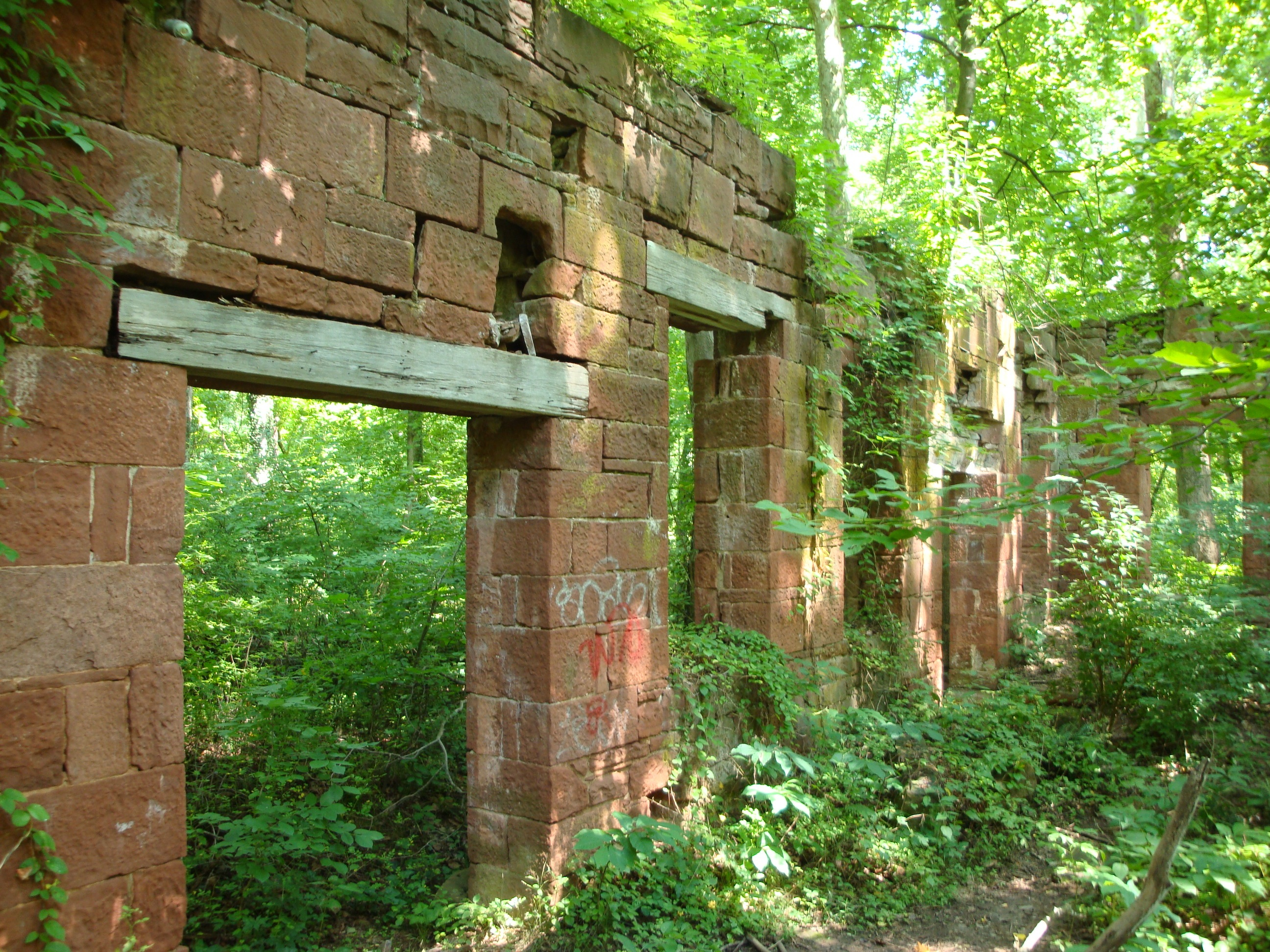
Built in 1837, the Seneca stonecutting mill cut the stone for the Smithsonian Castle

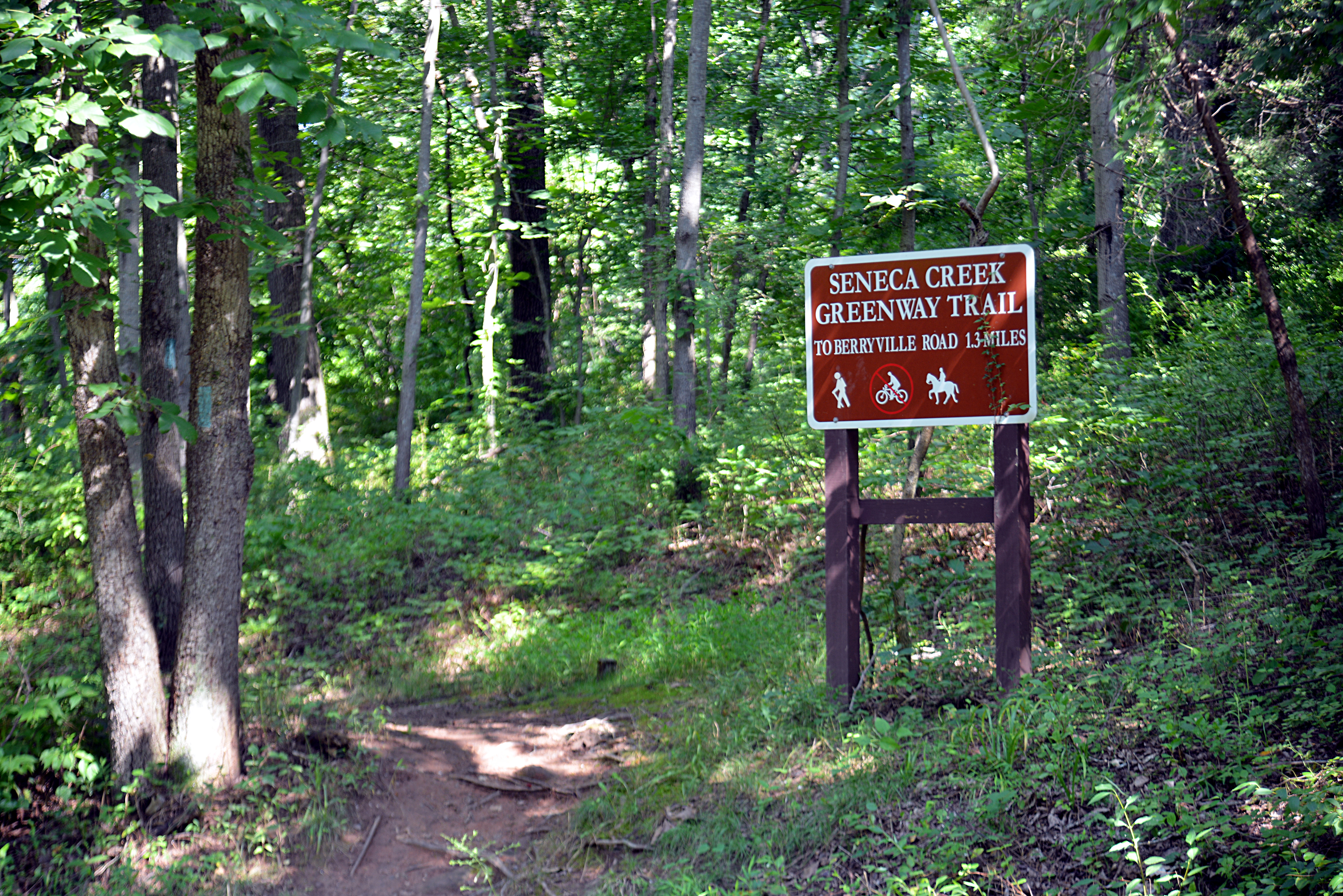
The entrance to Seneca Creek Greenway trail at Seneca Rd in Darnestown, MD.

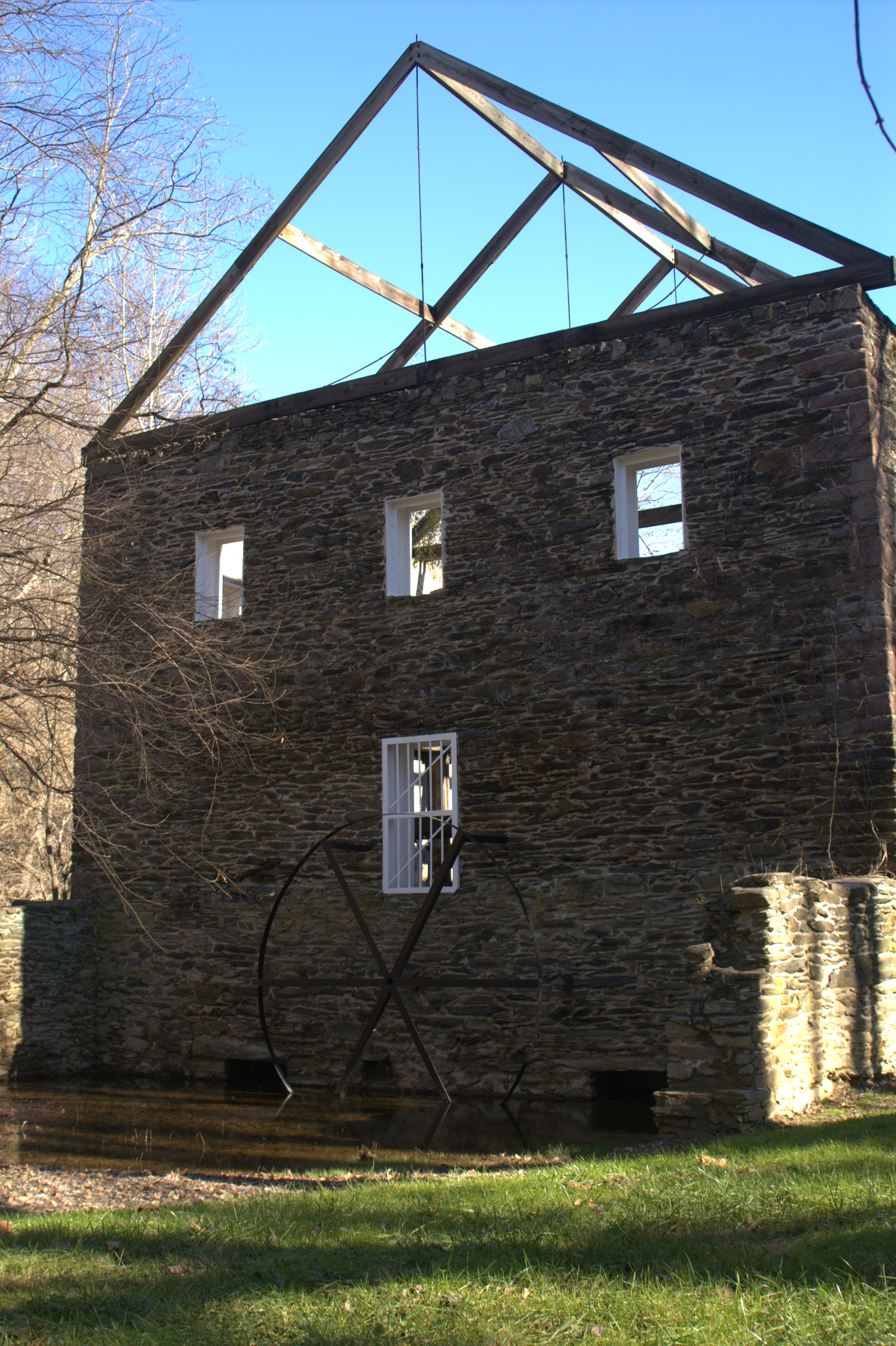
Remains of Black Rock Mill

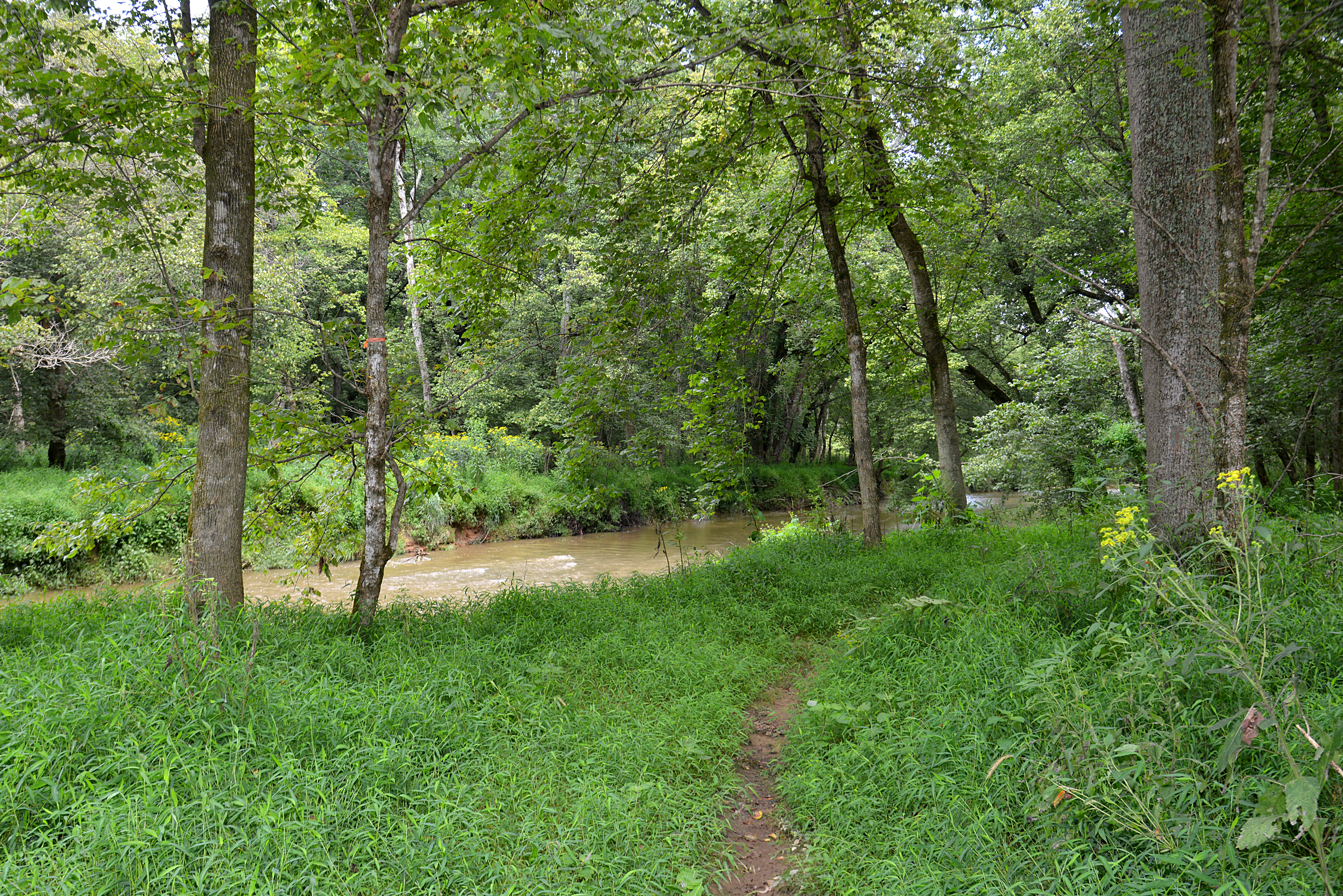
Seneca Creek Greenway trail running beside Great Seneca Creek in Germantown, MD

== County maintained section ==
The state-run portion of the trail ends at Maryland Route 355. The county portion is a 7.8-mile natural-surface trail that continues to the north. Follow the trail under the bridge, then cross the creek on the bridge to get to a gravel parking area. From there the trail runs to Watkins Mill Road, where there is also a parking area. The trail continues north to its end at Watkins Road, but you can continue to Damascus Recreational Park on the Lower Magruder Trail.

Trail sections
Mileage	Section
3.0 miles (4.8 km)	Route 355 to Watkins Mill Road
1.4 miles (2.3 km)	Watkins Mill Road to Brink Road
1 mile (1.6 km)	Brink Road to Huntmaster Road
2.8 miles (4.5 km)	Huntmaster Road to Watkins Road

Seneca Greenway Trail between Maryland Route 355 and Watkins Road
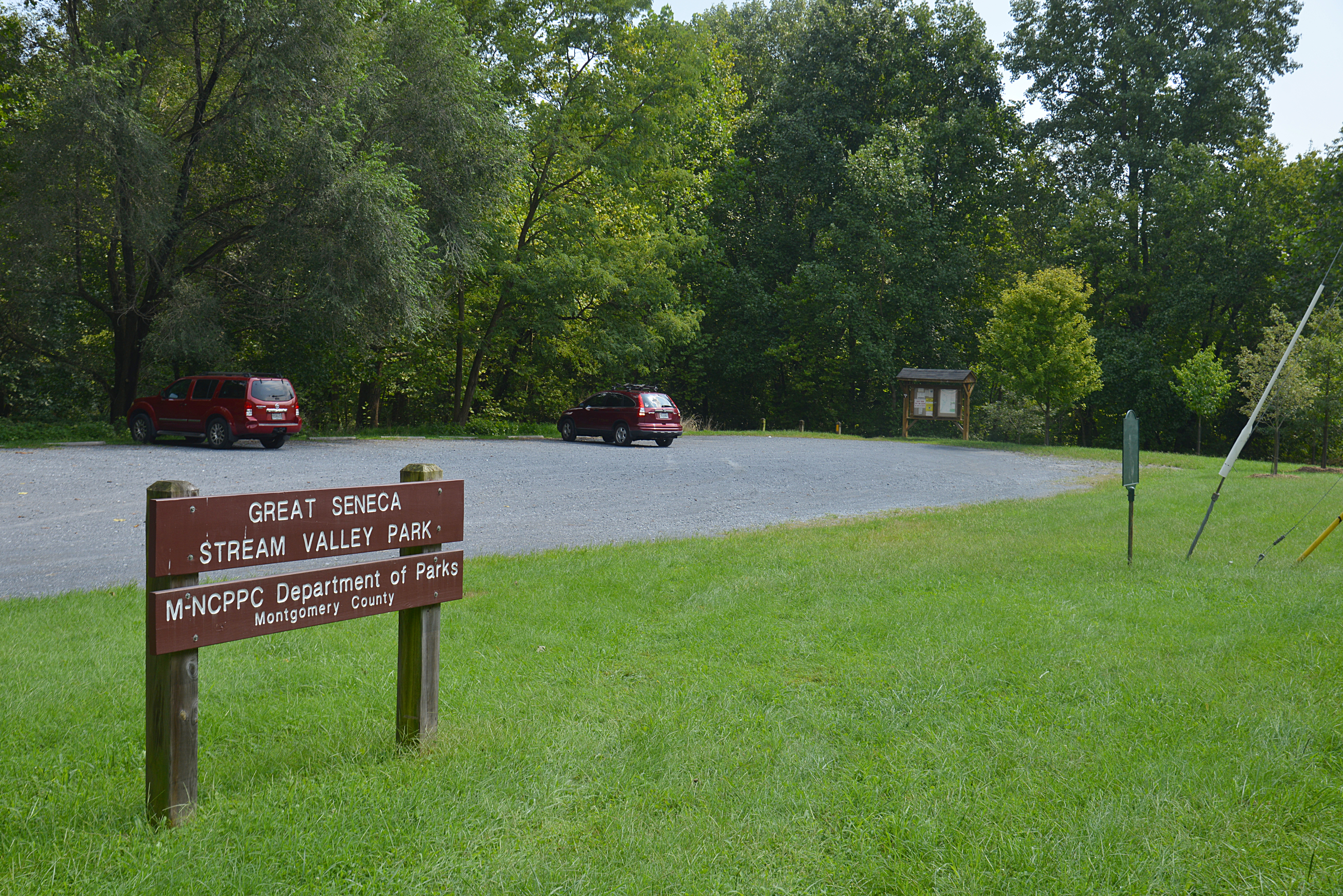
Parking area on Maryland Route 355 for the Great Seneca Stream Valley Park

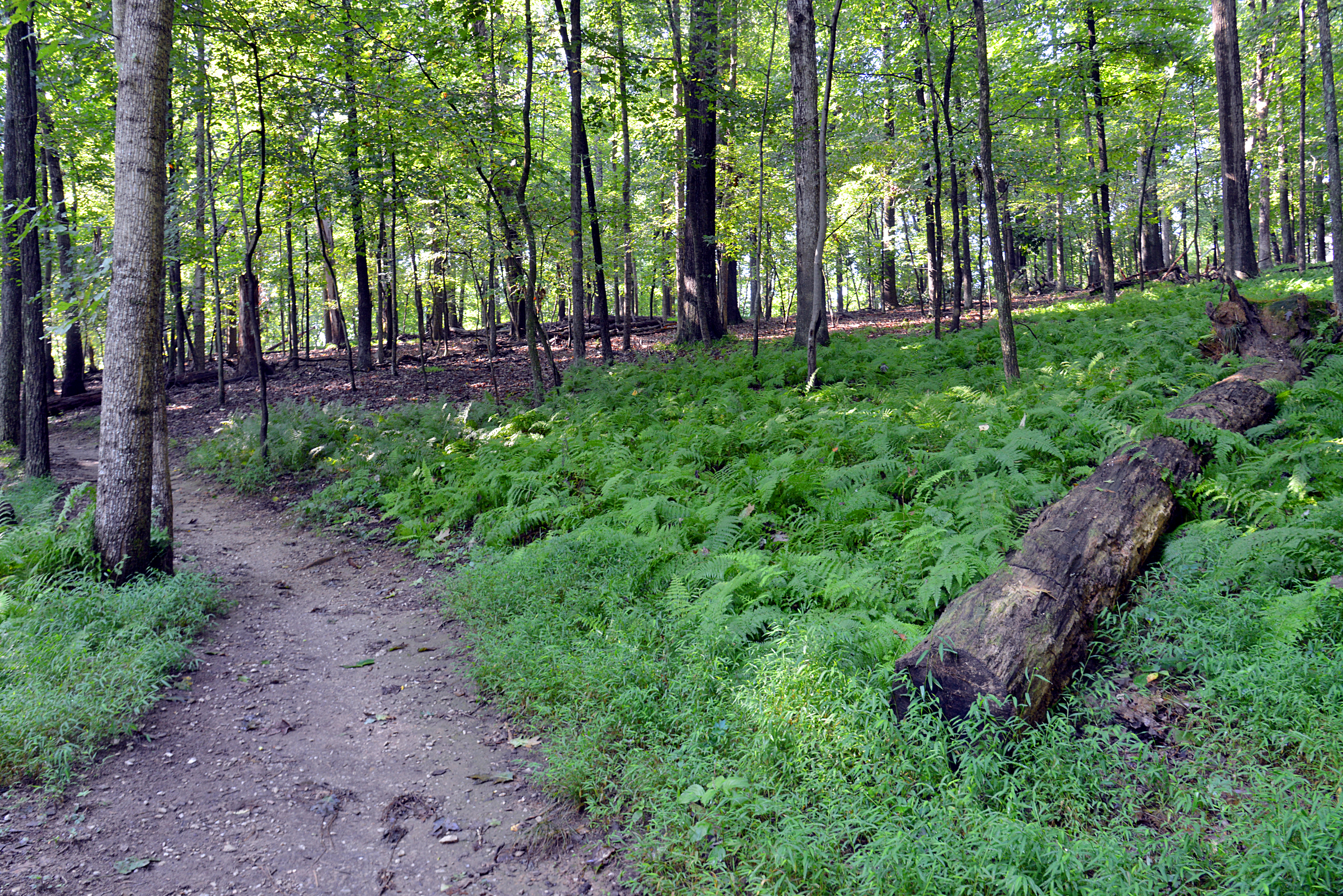
Ferns by the side of the Seneca Creek Greenway Trail in Germantown, MD

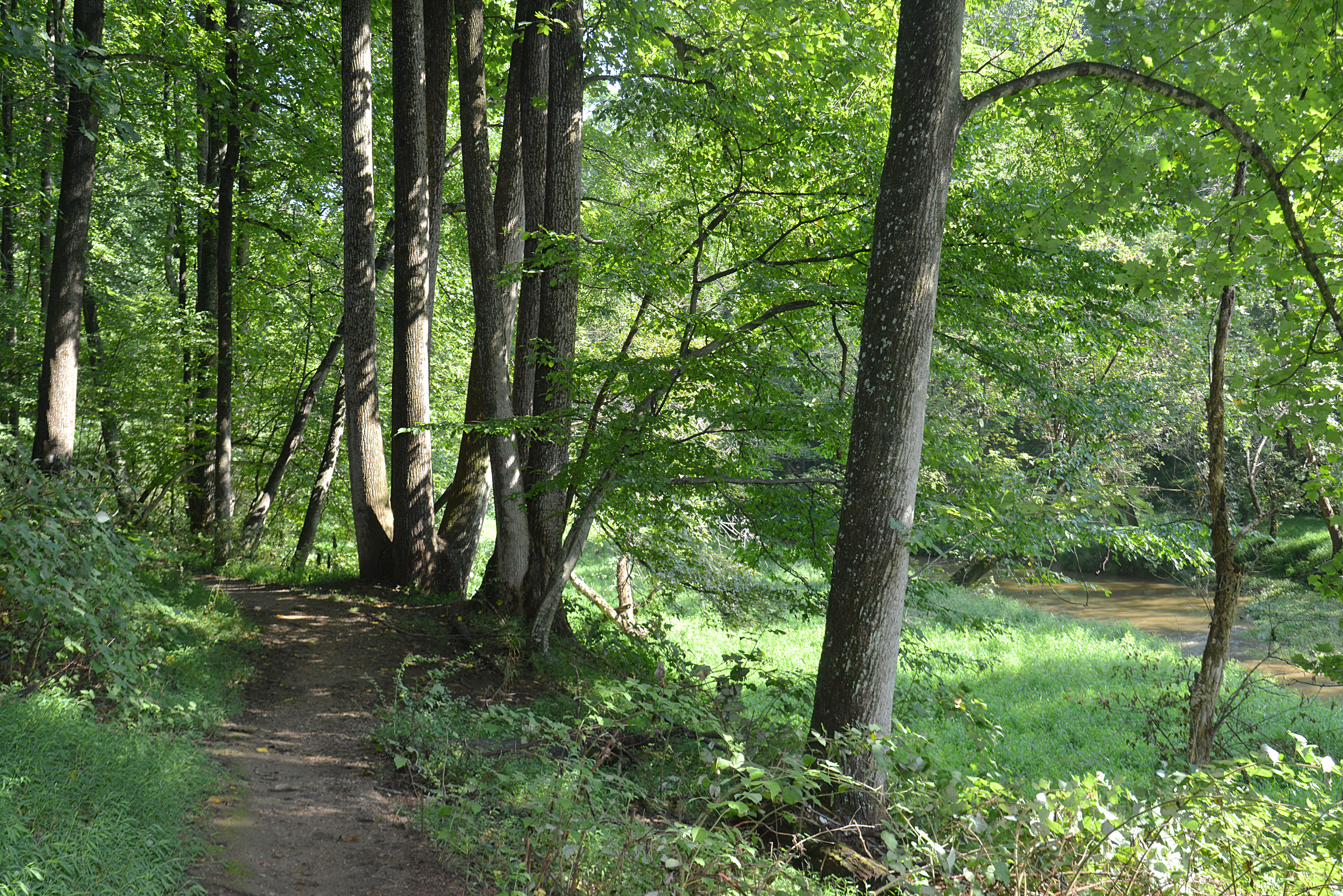
Seneca Creek Greenway trail and Great Seneca Creek in Germantown, MD

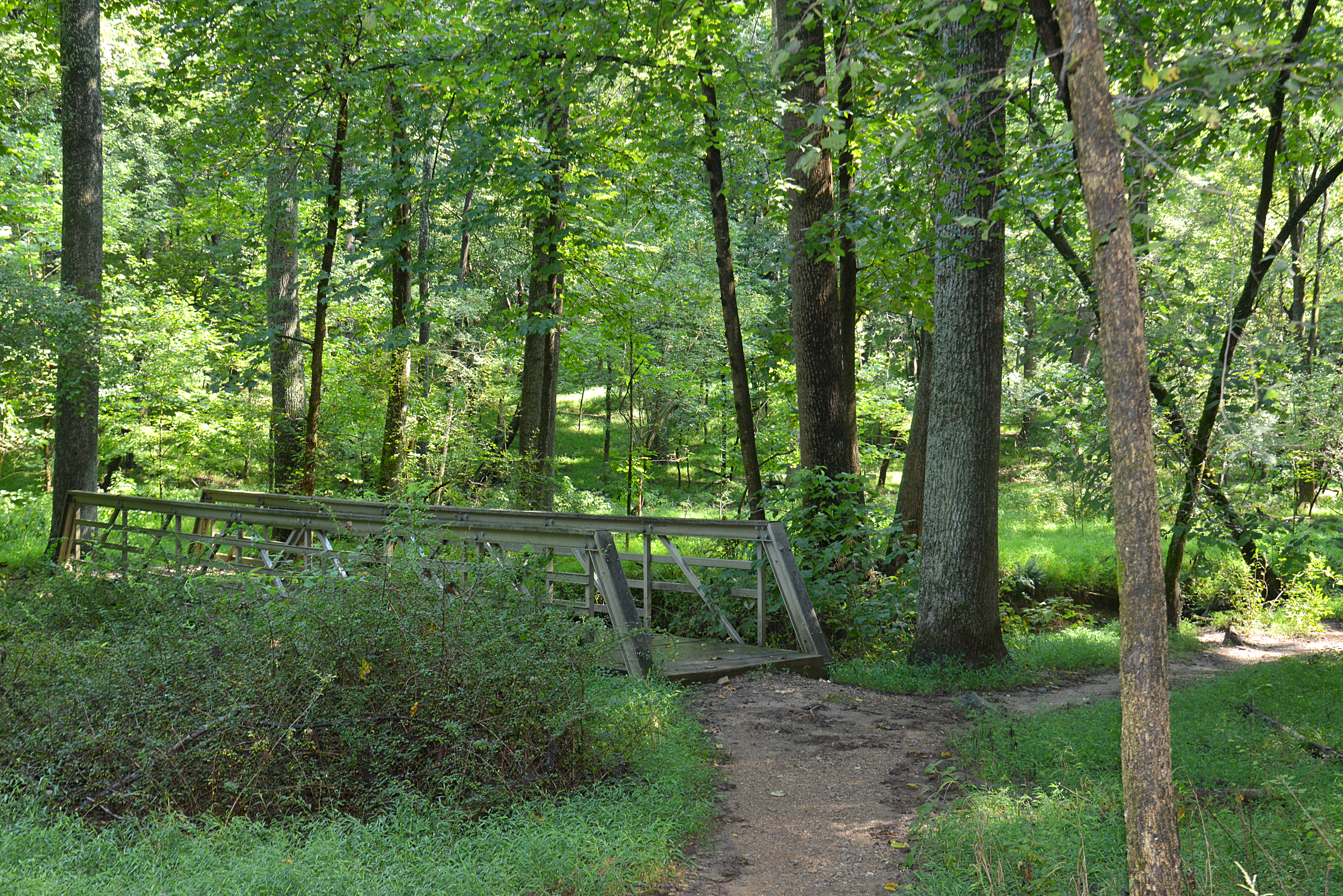
Seneca Creek Greenway trail and foot bridge in Germantown, MD
