= Maine State Building =

- U.S. National Register of Historic Places
- U.S. Historic district – Contributing property
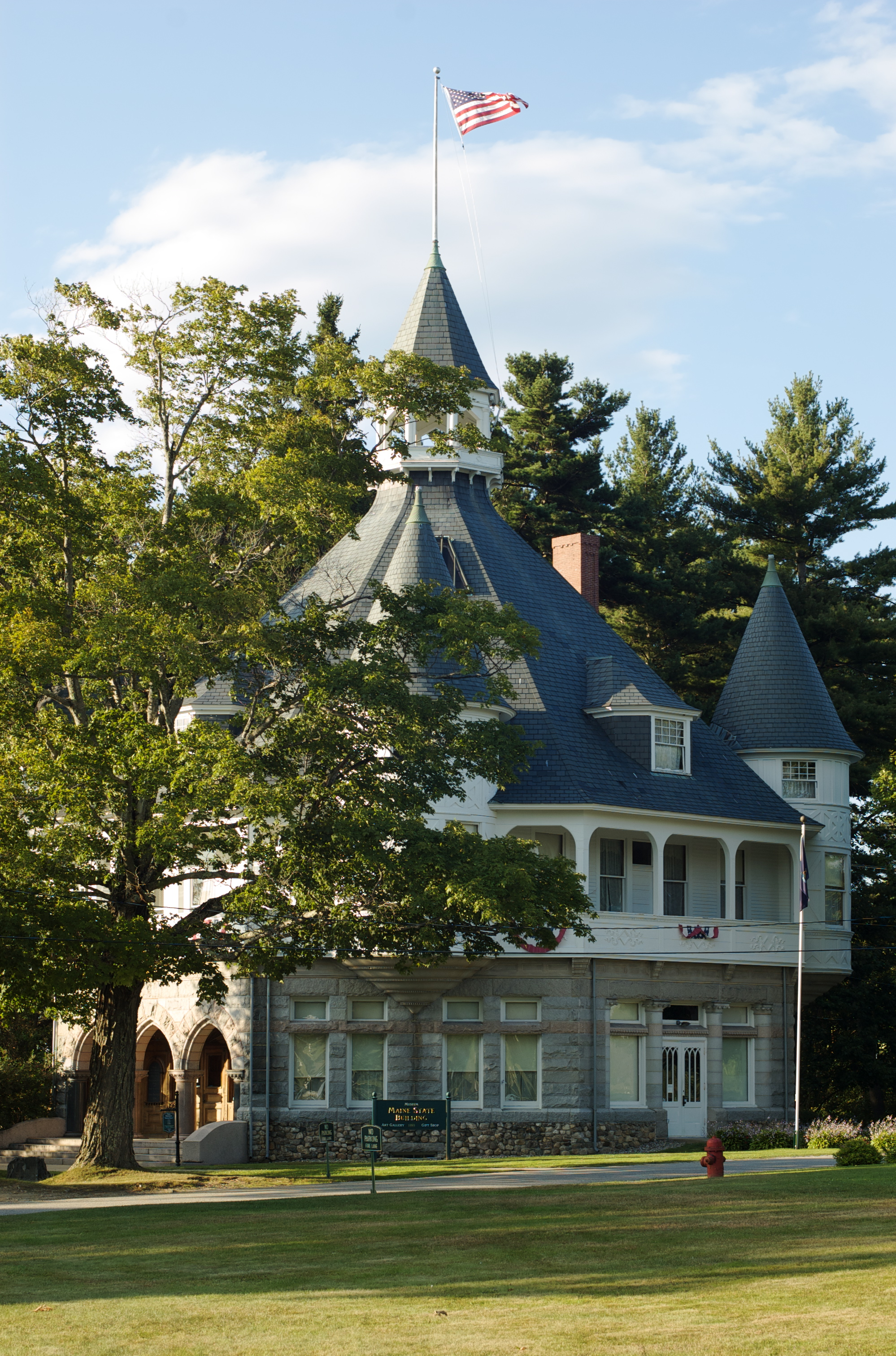

- Location within Maine Location within the United States
- Location: Preservation Way, South Poland, Maine
- Coordinates: 44°1′37.98″N 70°21′44.02″W
- Built: 1893
- Architect: Charles Sumner Frost
- Architectural style: Queen Anne
- Part of: Poland Springs Historic District (ID13000595)
- NRHP reference No.: 74000148

Significant dates
- Added to NRHP: July 18, 1974
- Designated CP: August 13, 2013

The Maine State Building is a historic building on Preservation Way, part of the Poland Springs resort complex in South Poland, Maine. It was built in 1893 at the Columbian Exposition in Chicago. Designed by Chicago architect Charles Sumner Frost, a Lewiston, Maine native and MIT graduate, the building was constructed of granite with a slate roof. All the materials were from Maine and crafted by craftsmen and companies from Maine. At the fair, the building was filled with displays about the State of Maine.

The granite that composed the building came from ten different quarries throughout the state and the slate on the roof comes from the Monson Slate Company of Monson, Maine.

The Ricker Family bought the building for $30,000. Arrangements were made for the dismantling of the building and shipping by freight train back to Maine, which was to take 16 freight cars. The Rickers sent a crew of 19 men to Chicago, led by Forest Walker of Poland, the resort's head carpenter and civil engineer to take the building down, carefully marking each section. The building was taken apart under the personal supervision of Hiram W. Ricker, loaded on a special train of sixteen cars and transported to Maine, at a cost of over three thousand dollars. It was to become the crowning feature of the opening of the season of 1895. The cornerstone was laid on August 14, 1894, and the Maine State Building was dedicated on July 1, 1895, as part of the celebration marking the Ricker's settling in Poland.

After its move to Poland Spring, the first floor was dedicated to a library and reading room. The second floor had bedrooms for overnight guests. The third floor was an Art Gallery where American art was shown.

Today, the Maine State Building is under the supervision of the Poland Spring Preservation Society, an organization dedicated to the restoration and preservation of the Maine State Building and All Soul's Chapel in Poland. The Society operates the Nettie Ricker Art Gallery in the Maine State Building, with changing exhibits of local and regional art.

Along with the Norway Building in Norway, The Dutch House in Massachusetts, and the Palace of Fine Arts (now the Museum of Science and Industry) and World Congress Auxiliary Building (now the Art Institute of Chicago) in Chicago, the Maine State Building is one of the few remaining buildings from the 1893 World's Fair.

== See also ==
- National Register of Historic Places listings in Androscoggin County, Maine
