= Keystone Mineral Springs =

- U.S. National Register of Historic Places
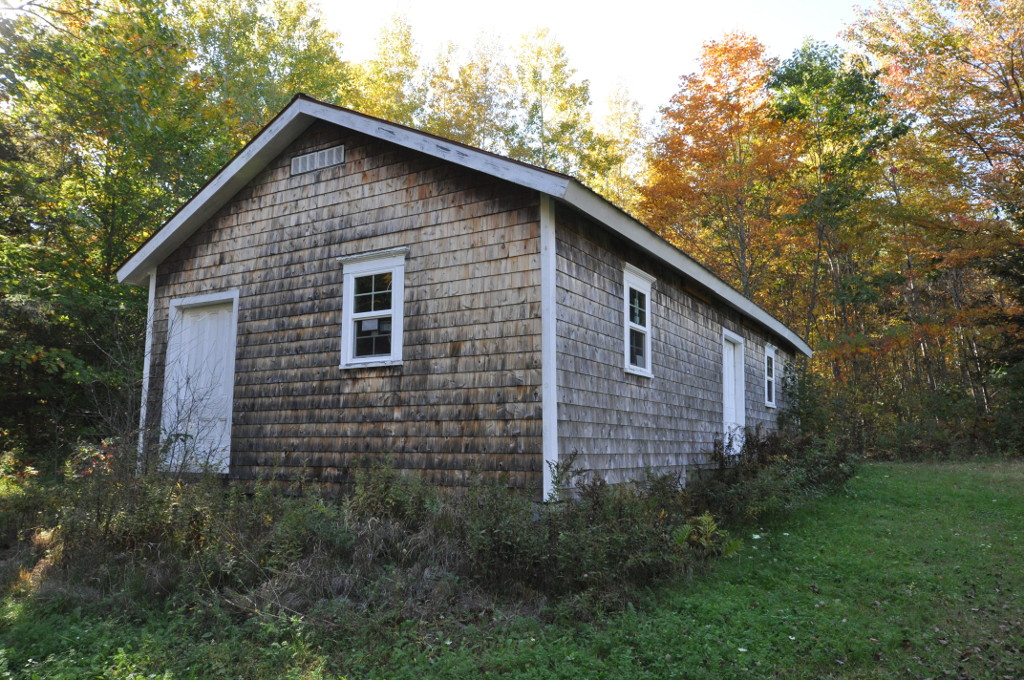

- Location within Maine Location within the United States
- Location: Keystone Spring Rd., Poland, Maine
- Coordinates: 44°4′44″N 70°19′29″W
- Area: 3.5 acres (1.4 ha)
- Built: c. 1885
- Architectural style: Italianate
- NRHP reference No.: 05001175
- Added to NRHP: October 19, 2005; 20 years ago

Keystone Mineral Springs is an historic mineral water bottling facility on Keystone Spring Road in Poland, Maine. Located along the former right-of-way of Keystone Spring Road in eastern Poland, the facility consists of two structures, a spring house built c. 1885 and a bottling house built in 1929. The facilities are, along with the more well-known Poland Spring Bottling Plant and Spring House, the only known surviving elements of the early period of mineral water bottling in Maine. The property was listed on the National Register of Historic Places in 2005.

== Description ==
The Keystone spring house and bottling house are accessed via Keystone Spring Road, a grass and dirt track that parallels Empire Road, running north-south for most of its length, with a short paved section at the southern end where the road joins Empire Road. The spring house is located a short way north of the southern bend, and the bottling house is about 300 feet (91 m) further north.

The spring house is a single story clapboarded structure with a gable roof, measuring 20 feet (6.1 m) by 40 feet (12 m). It is located on the west side of the roadway, oriented east-to-west, although its main facade faces north, along a track leading to the farmstead of the Pratt family who first developed the spring. The main facade has three bays, the central one containing a large sliding door, while the bay to the east has a window and that to the west has a smaller doorway that is now blocked up. The eastern facade also has a large sliding door. The interior has been neglected to the point where elements are collapsing. The spring rises in a granite basin set in a concrete floor, and is captured in a pipe which extends to the bottling house.

The bottling house is also a single story wood frame structure, built in 1929 after the previous building on the site was destroyed by fire. It is architecturally unremarkable, with similar proportions to the spring house. Its interior is largely unfinished, with exposed ceiling rafters and wall joists. The southern part of the building is taken up by a 900-US-gallon (3,400 L) tank, lined in granite, with an overflow catchbasin and troughs at which the filling operation took place. At the north end of the building is a room in which the filled bottles were capped, labelled and packaged for shipping. Much of the original early 20th-century equipment used in these processes remains.

== History ==
The Keystone Mineral Spring was operated as a business from 1885 until the mid-1990s, primarily serving central Maine. Seriah M. Pratt, the farmer who owned the land, realized that the quality of the water from his spring was comparable to that of Poland Spring, and began bottling and selling it in 1884. In 1885 he brought in his nephew, Edward Pratt, who acquired full control of the business in 1896. The business was a success, delivering bottled water in Maine as far away as Portland; some was also shipped as far as Maryland, and New Jersey where the younger Pratt's business partner moved. It was operated in the 20th century by a succession of lessees until about 1995, although processing was at times sporadic because the spring ran dry. Plans were laid by new owners in 2004 to rehabilitate the facility and resume operations.

== See also ==
- National Register of Historic Places listings in Androscoggin County, Maine
