= East Poland =

East Poland may refer to:

- Eastern Poland, a geographical macroregion in Poland
- East Region (Poland), a first-level statistical region of Poland
- Eastern Borderlands, a former territory of Poland, located to the east of its current territory
- East Poland, Maine, an unincorporated village in the town of Poland, Androscoggin County, Maine, United States
- East Polish Soviet Socialist Republic, a former proposition for the constituent republic of the Soviet Union

== See also ==
- Eastern Polans, an East Slavic tribe between the 6th and the 9th centuries
- Why didn't you invest in Eastern Poland?, an ad campaign
