= All Souls Chapel (Poland Spring, Maine) =

- U.S. National Register of Historic Places
- U.S. Historic district – Contributing property
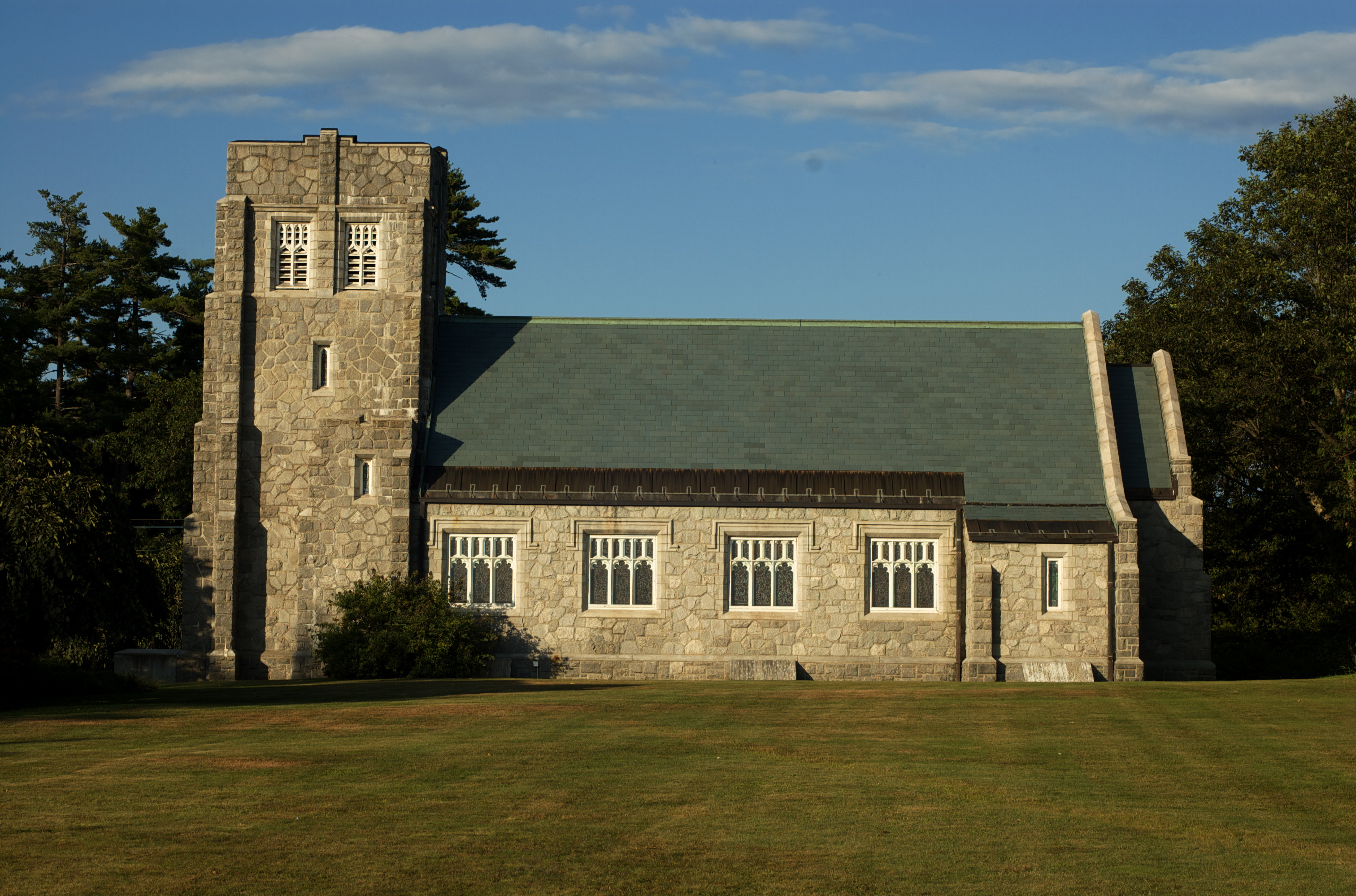

- Location within Maine Location within the United States
- Location: Preservation Way, South Poland, Maine
- Coordinates: 44°1′35″N 70°21′40″W
- Area: 1 acre (0.40 ha)
- Built: 1912
- Architect: G. Henri Desmond
- Architectural style: Late Gothic Revival
- Part of: Poland Springs Historic District (ID13000595)
- NRHP reference No.: 77000060

Significant dates
- Added to NRHP: November 17, 1977
- Designated CP: August 13, 2013

All Souls Chapel is a historic chapel at the Poland Spring Resort in Poland, Maine. It was built in 1912. In 1977, it was added to the National Register of Historic Places.

The chapel was built in 1912 for use by the staff and guests of the Poland Spring Resort. It is owned by the Poland Spring Preservation Society which also owns the Maine State Building (from the World's Columbian Exposition of 1893 in Chicago).

The chapel houses a series of hand-painted windows and an Ernest M. Skinner Opus 564 pipe organ.

== See also ==
- National Register of Historic Places listings in Androscoggin County, Maine
