= Poland Spring Beach House =

Historic house in Maine, United States

- Poland Spring Beach House, (Former)
- U.S. National Register of Historic Places
- U.S. Historic district – Contributing property
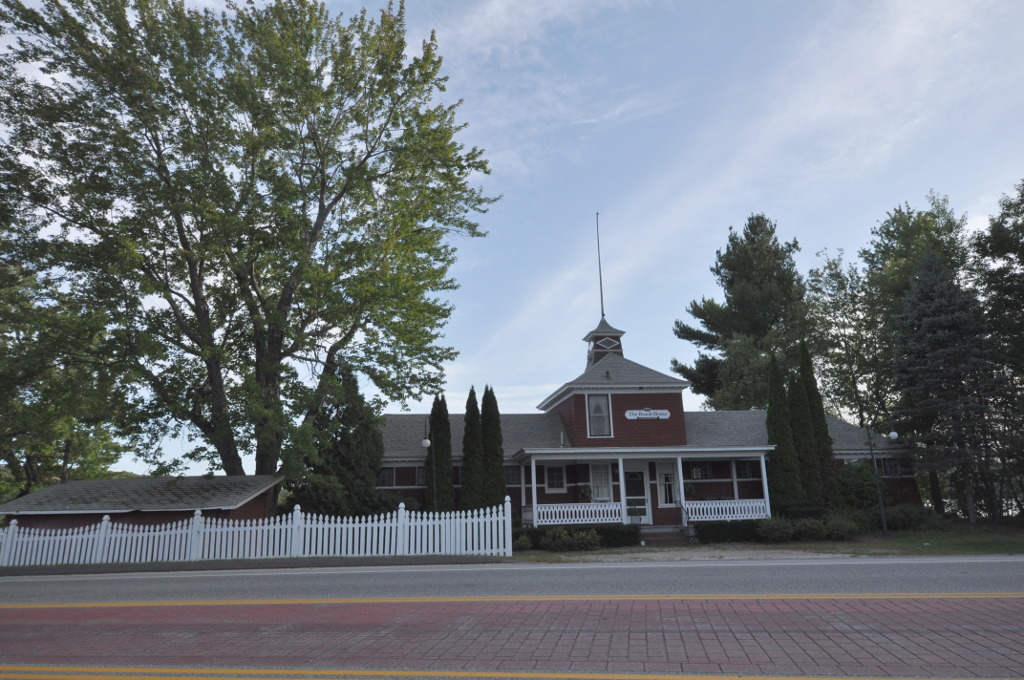

- Location within Maine Location within the United States
- Location: SR 26, 0.1 miles (0.16 km) east of its junction with Skellinger Rd., South Poland, Maine
- Coordinates: 44.0382°N 70.3746°W
- Area: less than one acre
- Built: 1909
- Architectural style: Late Victorian
- Part of: Poland Springs Historic District (ID13000595)
- NRHP reference No.: 99001191

Significant dates
- Added to NRHP: September 24, 1999
- Designated CP: August 13, 2013

The Poland Spring Beach House is an historic building on Maine State Route 26 in South Poland, Maine. It was built in 1909 as part of the extensive Poland Spring Resort, and was originally floated on Middle Pond on pontoons. It was set permanently on land in the 1930s, and converted into a private residence in the 1980s. It was listed on the National Register of Historic Places in 1999.

== Description and history ==
The former Poland Spring Beach House stands on the south side of Maine Street (SR 26), on a narrow isthmus separating Middle Range Pond (to the south) and Lower Range Pond (to the north). It is a shingled two story wood-frame structure, with a hip-roofed central section flanked by single-story wings, each also covered by a hip roof. The central section is topped by a cupola, and has wide porches extending across its width on both sides. The porch features scroll-sawn decorative elements, including balusters and brackets on the cornice. The porch on the lake side has been enclosed. On the inside, the wings, which originally housed changing areas, have had partitions removed to create living spaces as part of the building's conversion to residential use. Despite this and other alterations, the building interior retains a significant number of period Colonial Revival and Late Victorian features.

The Poland Spring resort complex was developed on the east side of Middle Range Pond in the second half of the 19th century, capitalizing on claims of restorative cures provided by waters from a spring, still in use today by the Poland Spring bottling operation. Its principal feature, the Poland Spring House, declined in the 20th century and burned in 1975. This beach house was built in 1909, and was originally floated on Middle Range Pond on pontoons during the busy summer tourist season. In the 1930s, it was permanently sited at its present location at the northern end of the lake. It remained in use as a beach house until the 1970s, when it was converted to private residential use. It is one of a small number of surviving early 20th-century inland resort beach houses in the state.

== See also ==
- National Register of Historic Places listings in Androscoggin County, Maine
