= Poland Spring Bottling Plant and Spring House =

- U.S. National Register of Historic Places
- U.S. Historic district – Contributing property
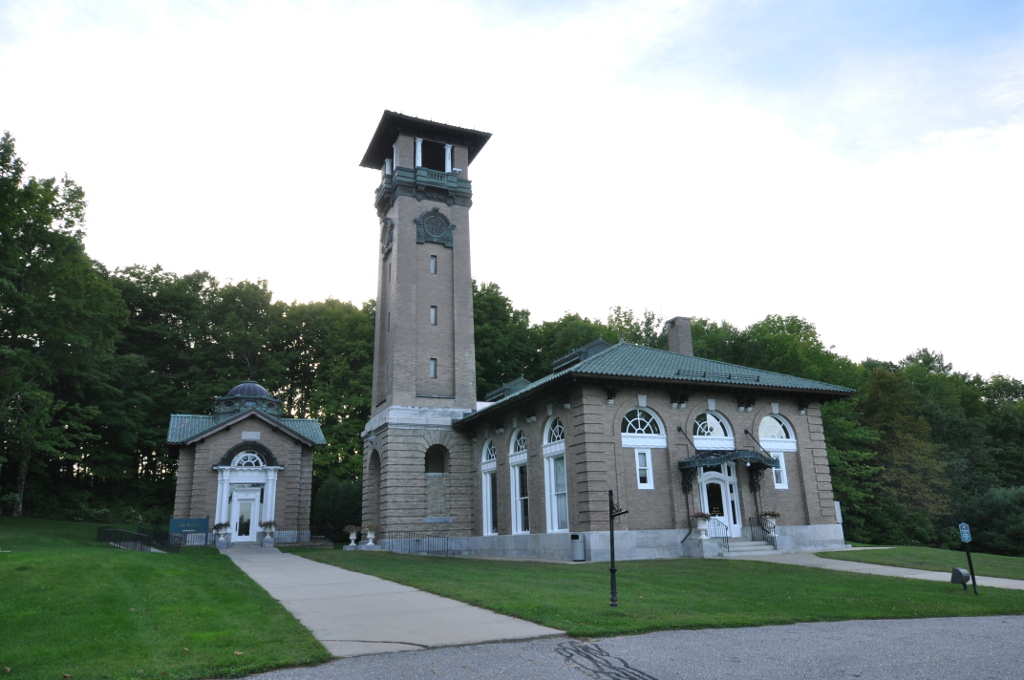

- Location within Maine Location within the United States
- Location: Preservation Way, Poland, Maine
- Coordinates: 44°1′44″N 70°21′35″W
- Built: 1907
- Architect: Wilkinson, Harry C.
- Architectural style: Renaissance
- Part of: Poland Springs Historic District (ID13000595)
- NRHP reference No.: 84001354

Significant dates
- Added to NRHP: March 22, 1984
- Designated CP: August 13, 2013

The Poland Spring Bottling Plant and Spring House is an historic water pumping and treatment facility in Poland, Maine. Built in 1907, these two buildings are the original spring house and water spa of the Poland Spring Resort, whose waters are still bottled under the Poland Spring brand name. The resort was the largest and most successful of Maine's inland summer resorts. The buildings were listed on the National Register of Historic Places in 1984; the spring house now houses the Poland Spring Museum and Environmental Education Center. Open seasonally, its exhibits feature the history of the company and its bottling operation, including scientific displays and vintage memorabilia.

== Description and history ==
The Poland Spring Bottling Plant and Spring House stand at the end of Preservation Way, behind the modern Poland Spring Inn and Resort, on the east side of Maine Street (Maine State Route 26) in South Poland. The former bottling plant is a rectangular building, with a hip roof that has overhanging bracketed eaves. It is dominated by a tall square tower at its southwest corner with an open top level whose openings are flanked by Tuscan columns. The tower is topped by a tiled shallow-slope pyramidal roof. Its base is of rusticated stone, with arched openings leading to the building entrance. The building windows are set in round-arch openings, and the corners have brick quoining. The building is shaped as a cross, with a copper dome at the center, and there is a secondary entrance sheltered by a copper hood. The bottling house is a smaller structure located just south of the spring house, its entrance featuring Tuscan columns and pilasters supporting an entablature.

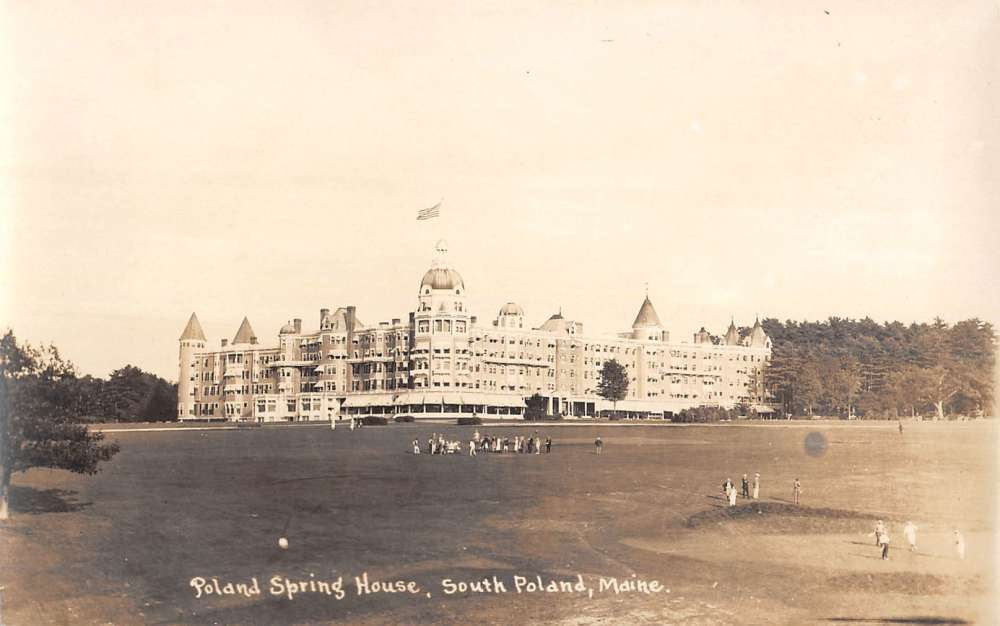

The Poland Spring resort achieved renown for its waters in the mid-19th century, and in 1876 the great Poland Spring House (destroyed by fire a century later) was built to cater to resort visitors taking its waters. Run by generations of the Ricker family, Edward P. Ricker in 1903 conceived of the idea of bottling the spring waters. He worked with Harry Wilkerson, a Poland native working as an architect in Washington, DC to draft the plans for these two buildings, which were completed in 1907.

== See also ==
- Keystone Mineral Springs
- National Register of Historic Places listings in Androscoggin County, Maine
