= Poland Springs Historic District =

Historic district in Maine, United States

- U.S. National Register of Historic Places
- U.S. Historic district
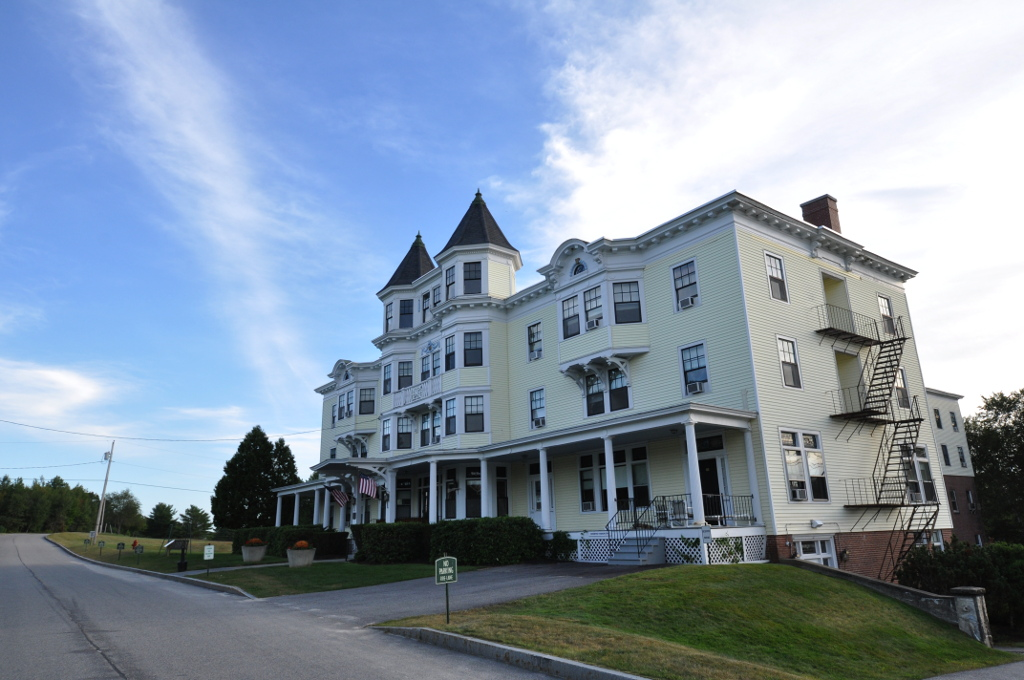

- Location within Maine Location within the United States
- Location: 543 Maine St., Poland, Maine
- Coordinates: 44°2′0″N 70°22′0″W
- Area: 236 acres (96 ha)
- Built: 1865
- Architect: Wilkinson, Harry C.
- Architectural style: Renaissance
- NRHP reference No.: 13000595
- Added to NRHP: August 13, 2013

The Poland Springs Historic District encompasses the area that was once Maine's premier inland summer resort, renowned for the supposed curative powers of its spring waters. Located on the north side of Maine Street (Maine State Route 26) in South Poland, Maine, United States, it includes surviving resort buildings in a landscaped environment that includes a golf course, as well as the earliest bottling facilities of water distributor Poland Spring. The district was listed on the National Register of Historic Places in 1984. Most of the district is now occupied by the Poland Springs Resort complex.

== Description and history ==
The historic Poland Springs resort complex is set east of Maine Street in South Poland. Its principal feature is the golf course (developed in the 1890s), with buildings clusted in two different areas near its southern end. Most of the buildings date between 1890 and 1915, although the largest, the Executive Inn, is a Classical Revival structure built in 1963. Near the inn stand the All Souls Chapel, built in 1912 as a place to hold religious services for guests and employees, and the 1893 Maine State Building, moved here from the World's Columbian Exposition in Chicago and now housing a museum. One element now separated from the surviving resort complex is its former 1919 beach house, now a private residence on the south side of Maine Street.

East of the resort complex, at the end of Preservation Way, stand the bottling plant and spring house. The former bottling plant is a rectangular building, with a hip roof that has overhanging bracketed eaves. It is dominated by a tall square tower at its southwest corner with an open top level whose openings are flanked by Tuscan columns. The tower is topped by a tiled shallow-slope pyramidal roof. Its base is of rusticated stone, with arched openings leading to the building entrance. The building windows are set in round-arch openings, and the corners have brick quoining. The building is shaped as a cross, with a copper dome at the center, and there is a secondary entrance sheltered by a copper hood. The bottling house is a smaller structure located just south of the spring house, its entrance featuring Tuscan columns and pilasters supporting an entablature.

The Poland Spring resort achieved renown for its waters in the mid-19th century, and in 1876 the great Poland Spring House (destroyed by fire a century later) was built to cater to resort visitors taking its waters. Run by generations of the Ricker family, Edward P. Ricker in 1903 conceived of the idea of bottling the spring waters. He worked with Harry Wilkerson, a Poland native working as an architect in Washington, DC to draft the plans for the bottling plant and spring house, which were completed in 1907.

== See also ==
- National Register of Historic Places listings in Androscoggin County, Maine
