= Jabez K. Walker =

American politician

Jabez K. Walker was an American politician. He was a member of the Wisconsin State Assembly during the 1876 and 1877 sessions. A Republican, he represented Waushara County, Wisconsin. He was born on August 5, 1819, in Poland, Maine. At the time, the town was located in Cumberland County, Maine.
