= Regional School Unit 16 =

School district in Maine

Regional School Unit 16, a consolidated school district serving Poland, Mechanic Falls and Minot, Maine, operates three elementary schools (K–6), one middle school (7–8) and one high school (9–12) in Androscoggin County in the U.S. state of Maine. The district has 154 teachers (FTEs) serving approximately 1,700 students.
