= Franeker City Hall =

Coordinates: 53°11′13″N 5°32′36″E

- Stadhuis van Franeker
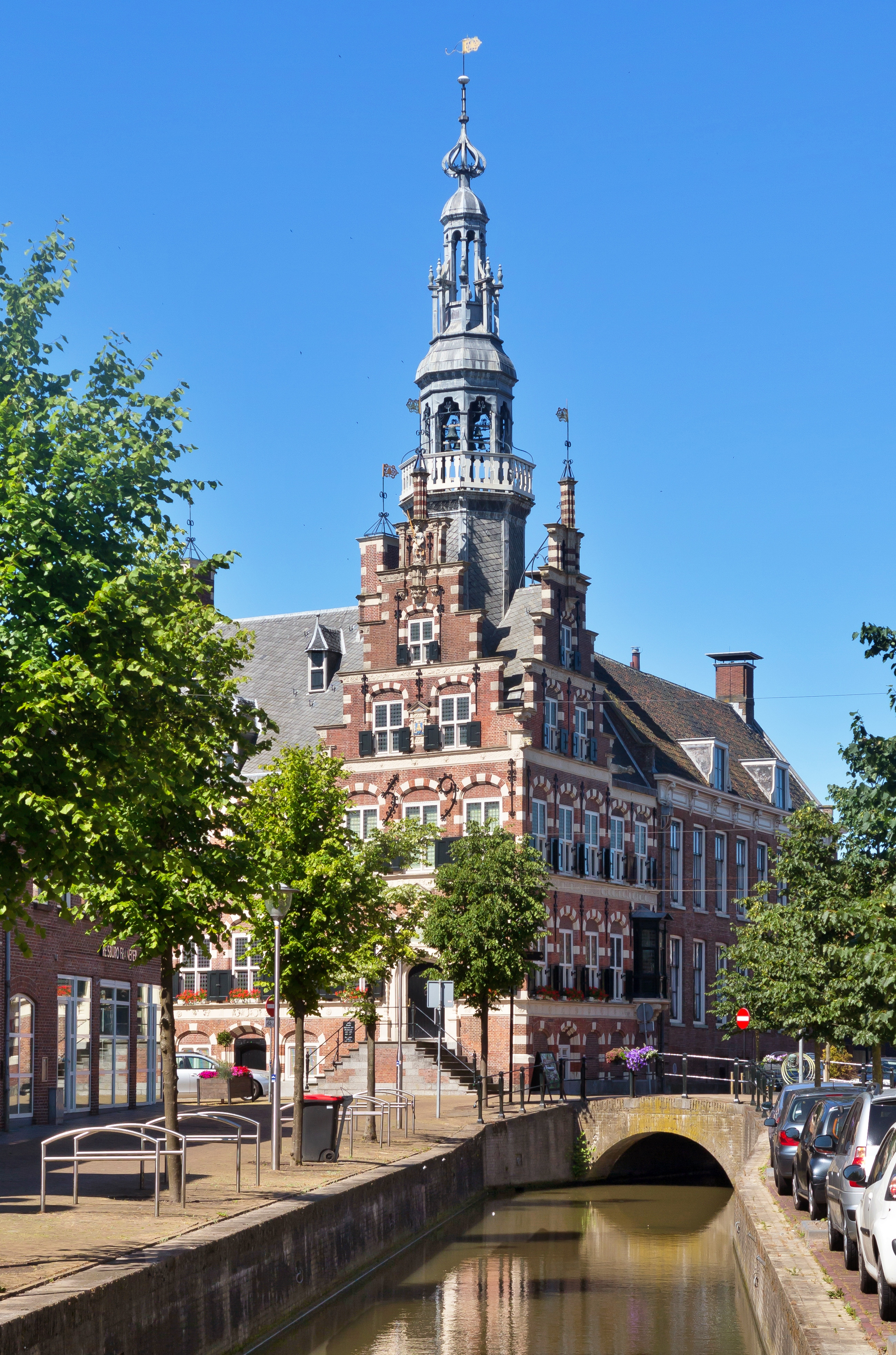
- Franeker City Hall
- Interactive map of the Franeker City Hall area

General information
- Type: Town hall
- Architectural style: Renaissance
- Location: Franeker, Netherlands, Raadhuisplein 1; 8801 KX, Franeker; Netherlands
- Construction started: 1591
- Completed: 1594

References
- Dutch national monument registry

Franeker City Hall (Dutch: Stadhuis van Franeker) is the city hall of the municipality of Franeker, Netherlands, one of the eleven historical cities of Friesland. The building dates from 1591–1594 and was built in Frisian renaissance style.

The first stone was laid on June 24, 1591. The building took a total of three years. Above the main entrance the coat of arms of Friesland is shown, and along the leadlights on the first floor, another 27 coats of arms are placed. It is a national monument and part of the Top 100 Dutch heritage sites. It is a rijksmonument since February 21, 1967, and is one of only three Frisian entries in the Top 100 Dutch heritage sites.

The Dutch House in Brookline, Massachusetts, in the United States of America, was built as a partial copy of the Franeker City Hall, and is itself on the US National Register of Historic Places.

== Gallery ==
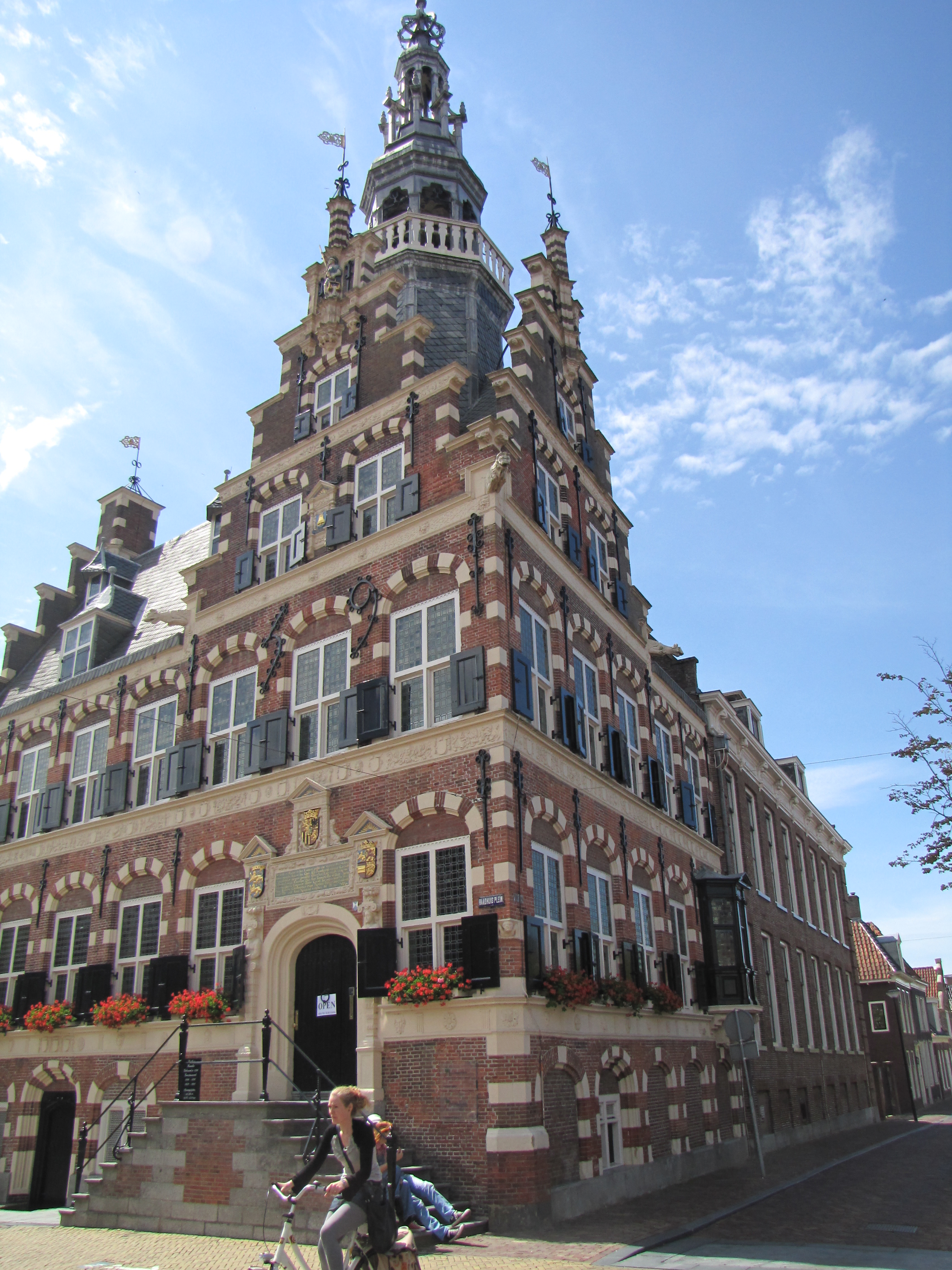
Exterior

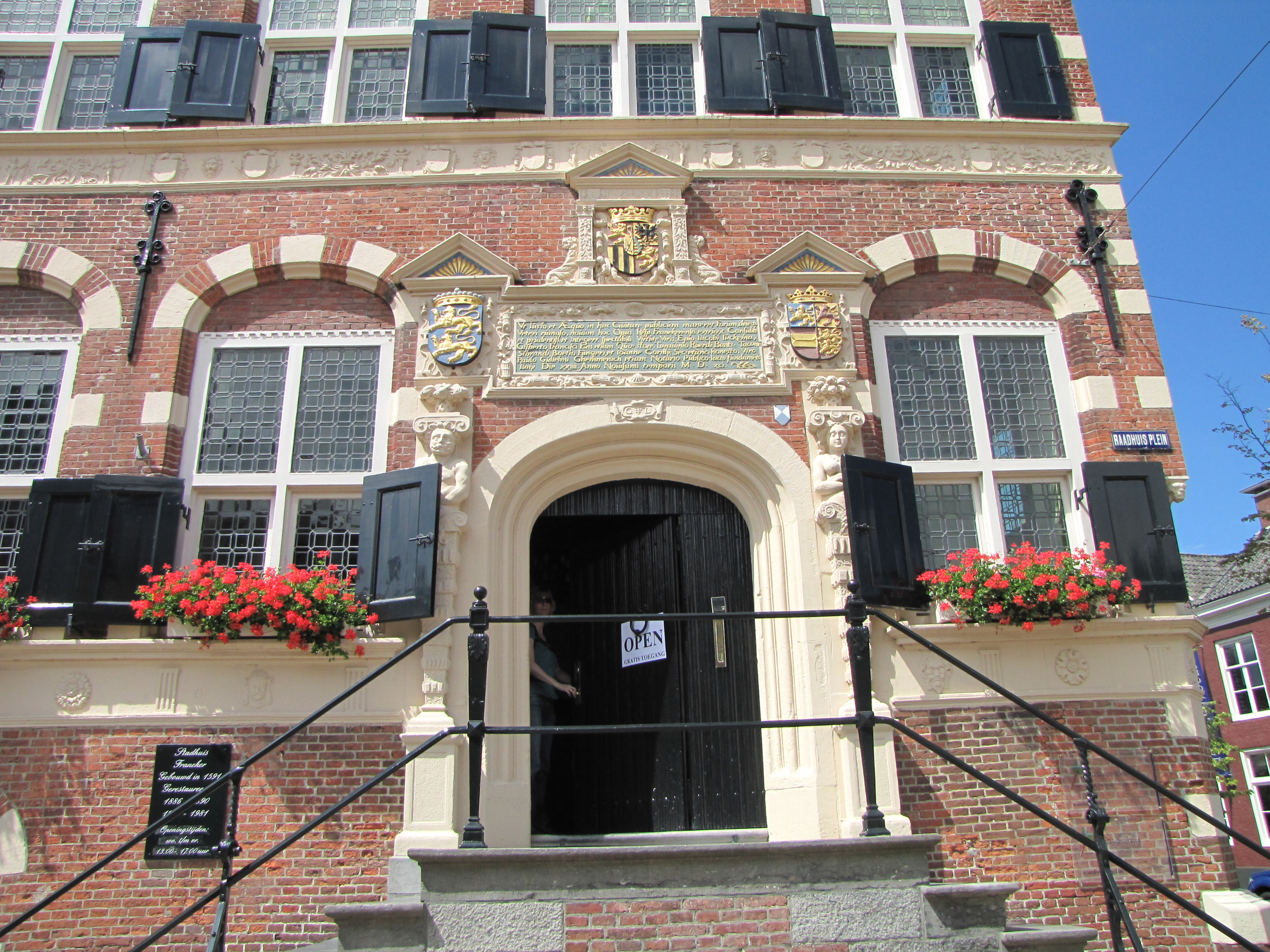
Main entrance

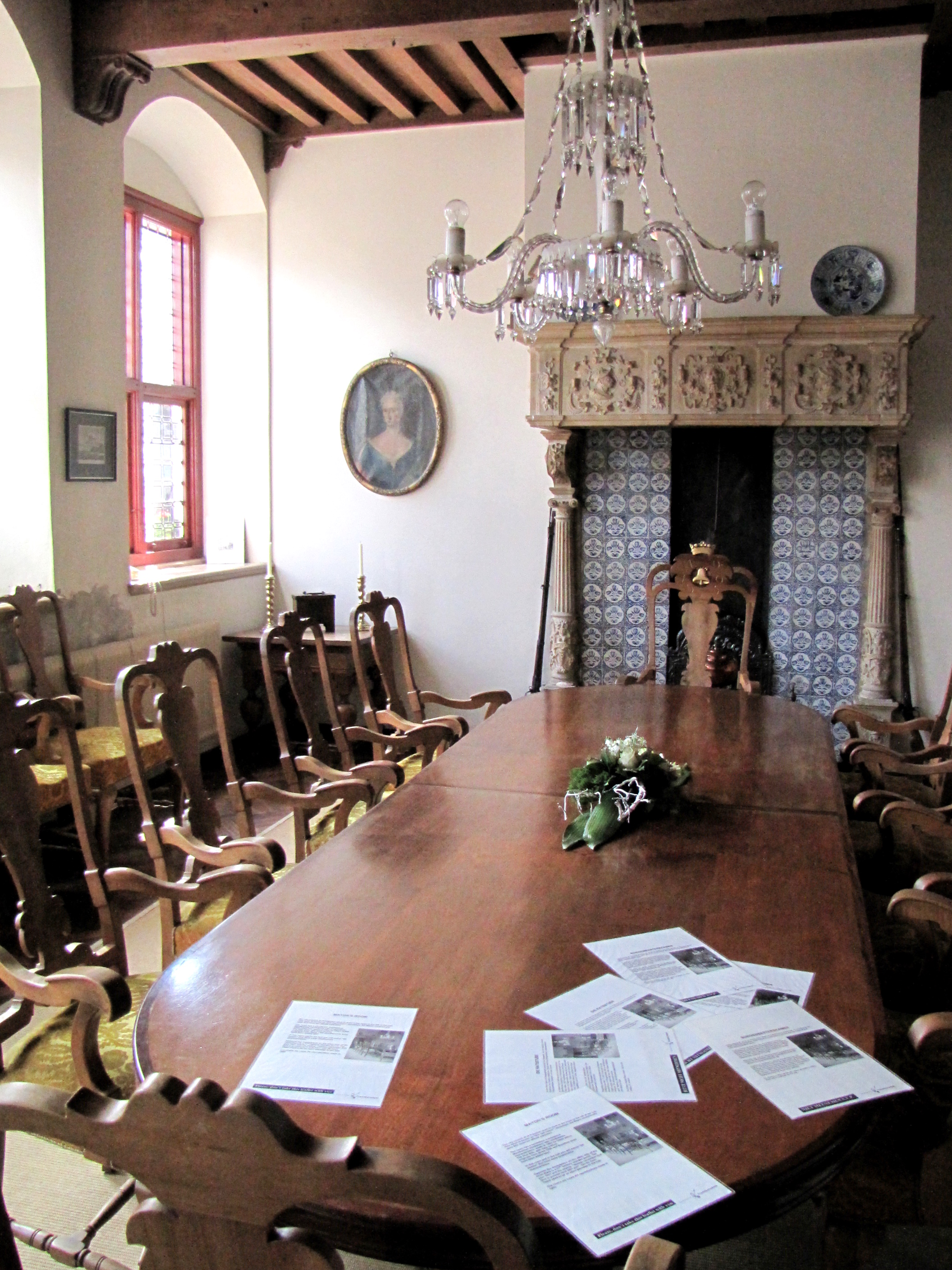
Interior

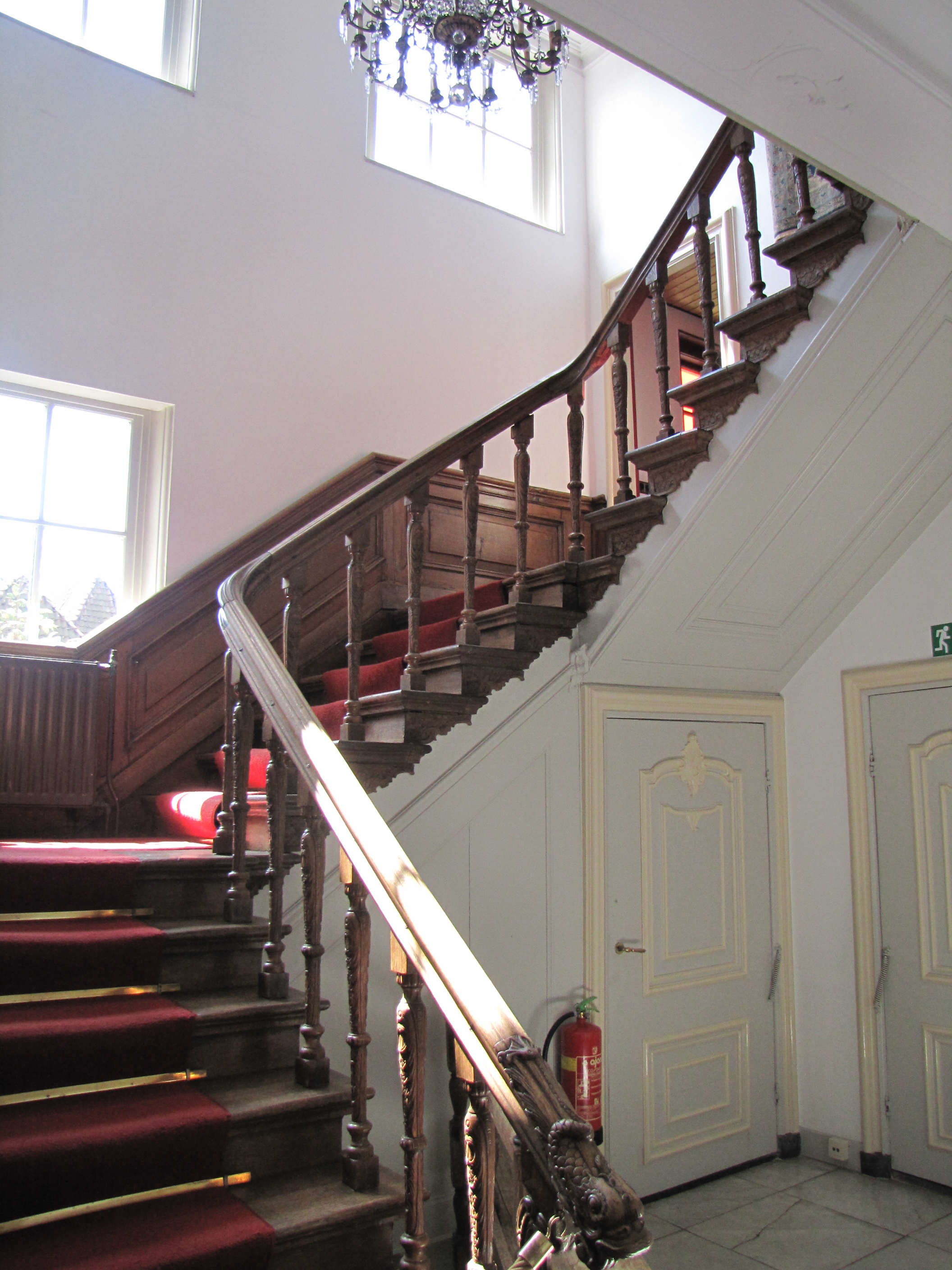
Stairway

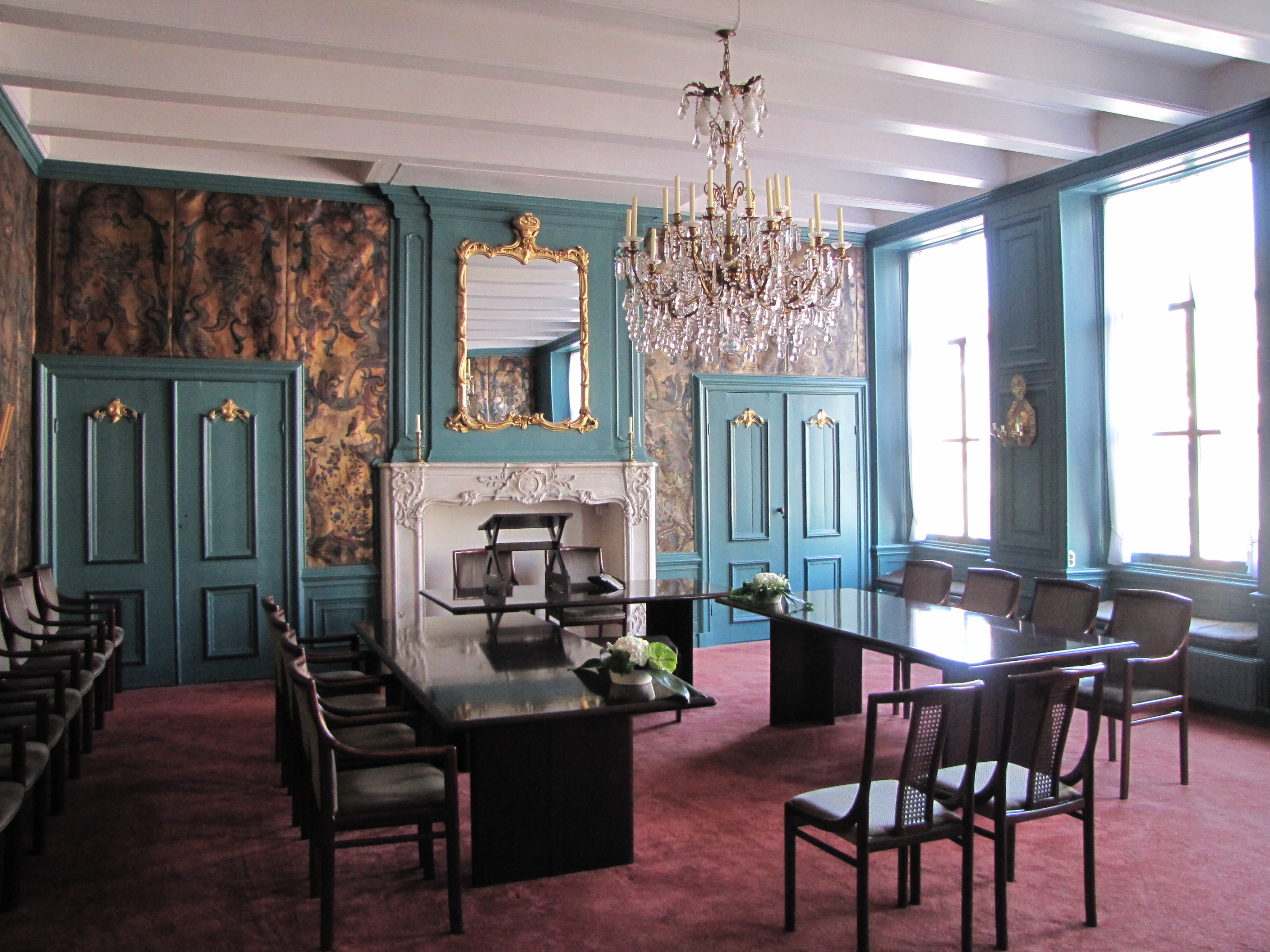
Interior

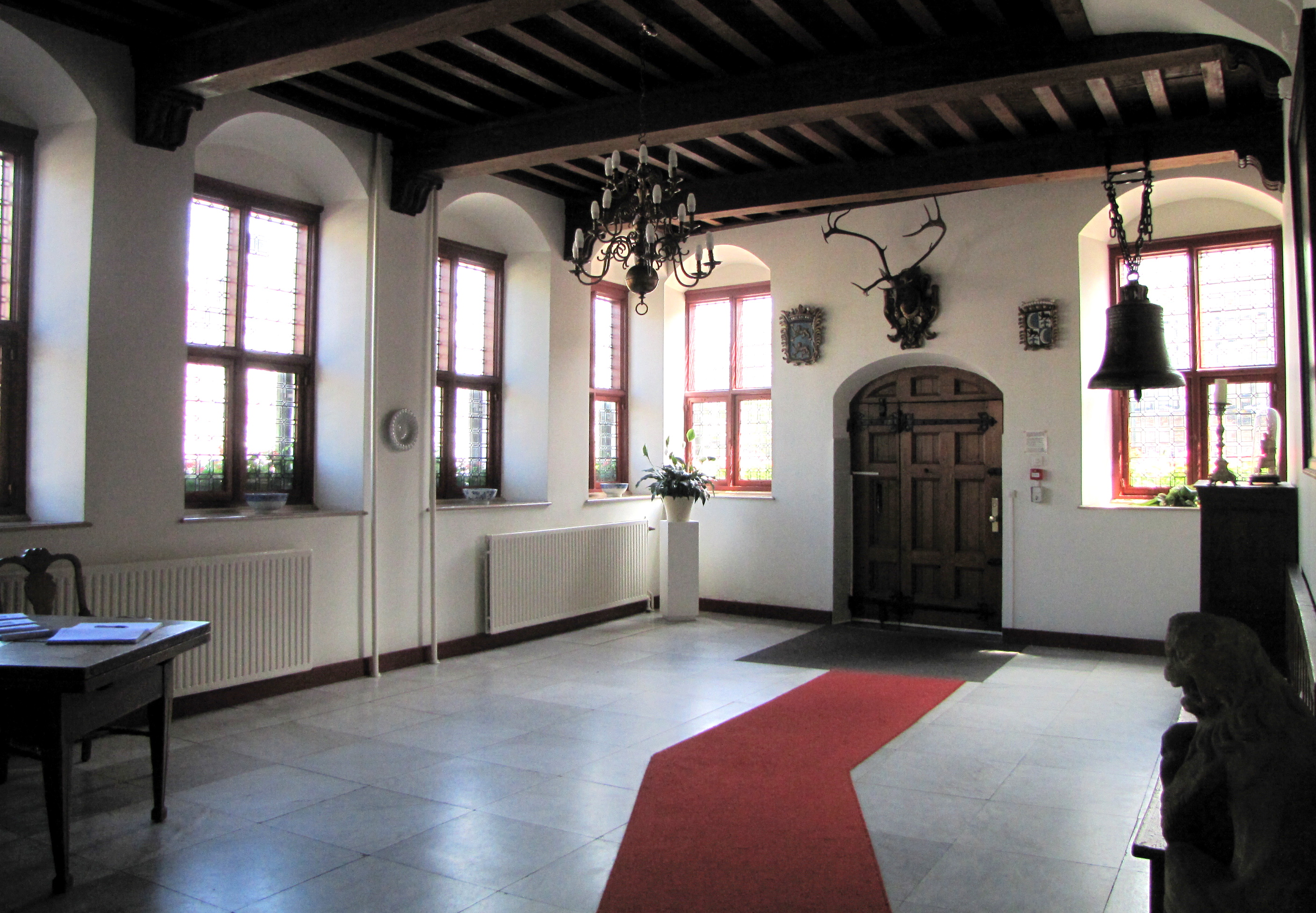
Hallway

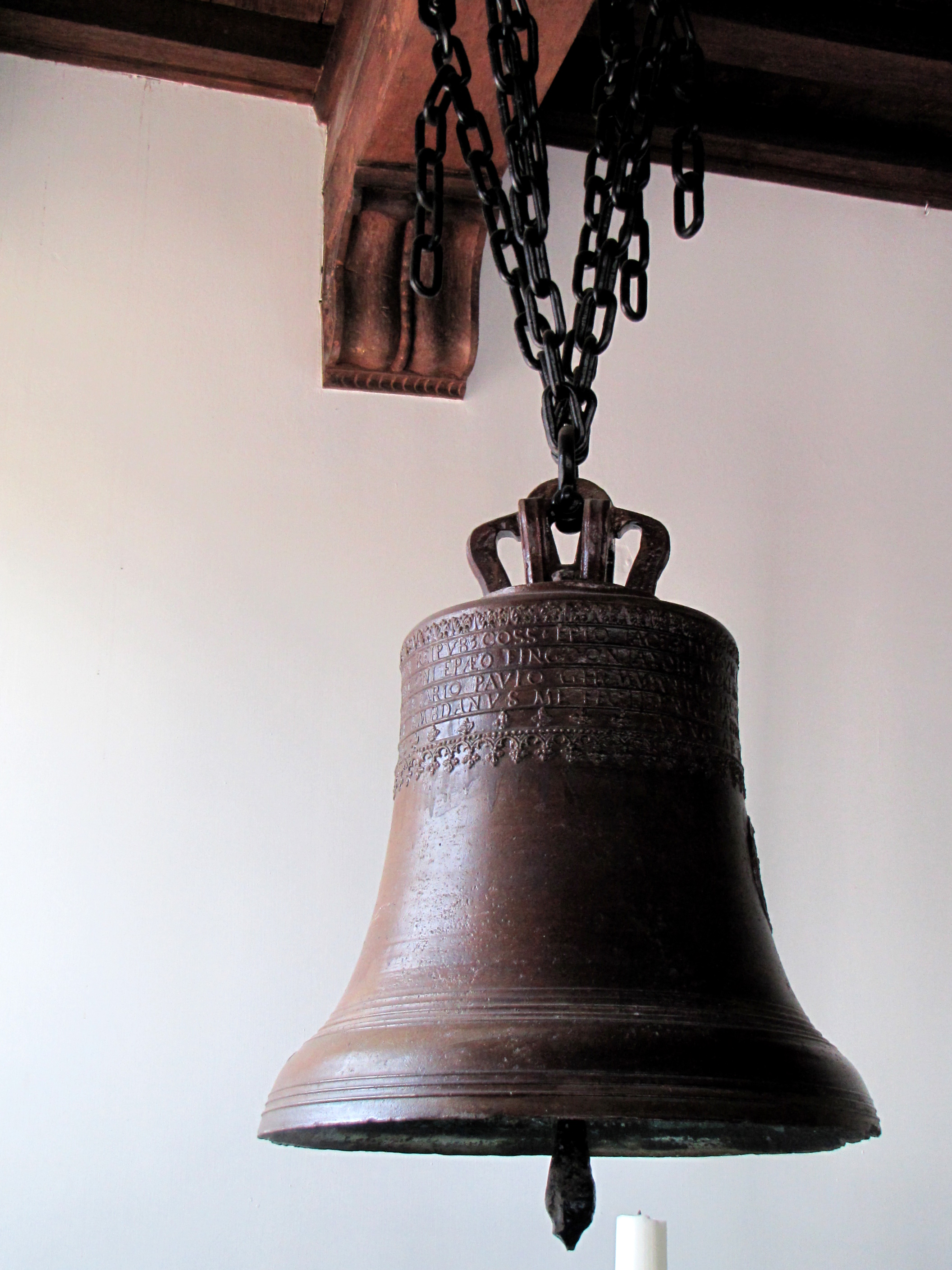
Bell

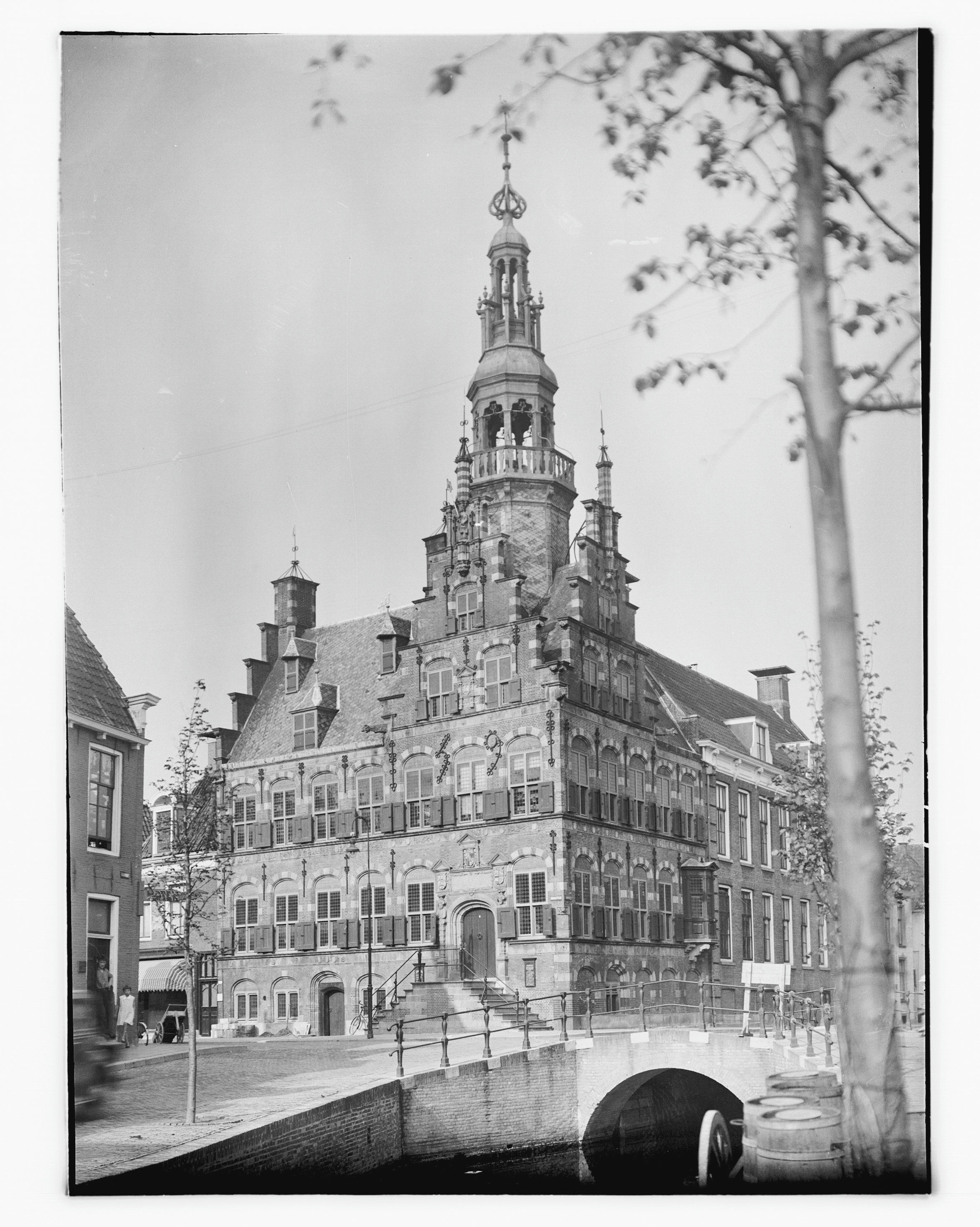
Overview

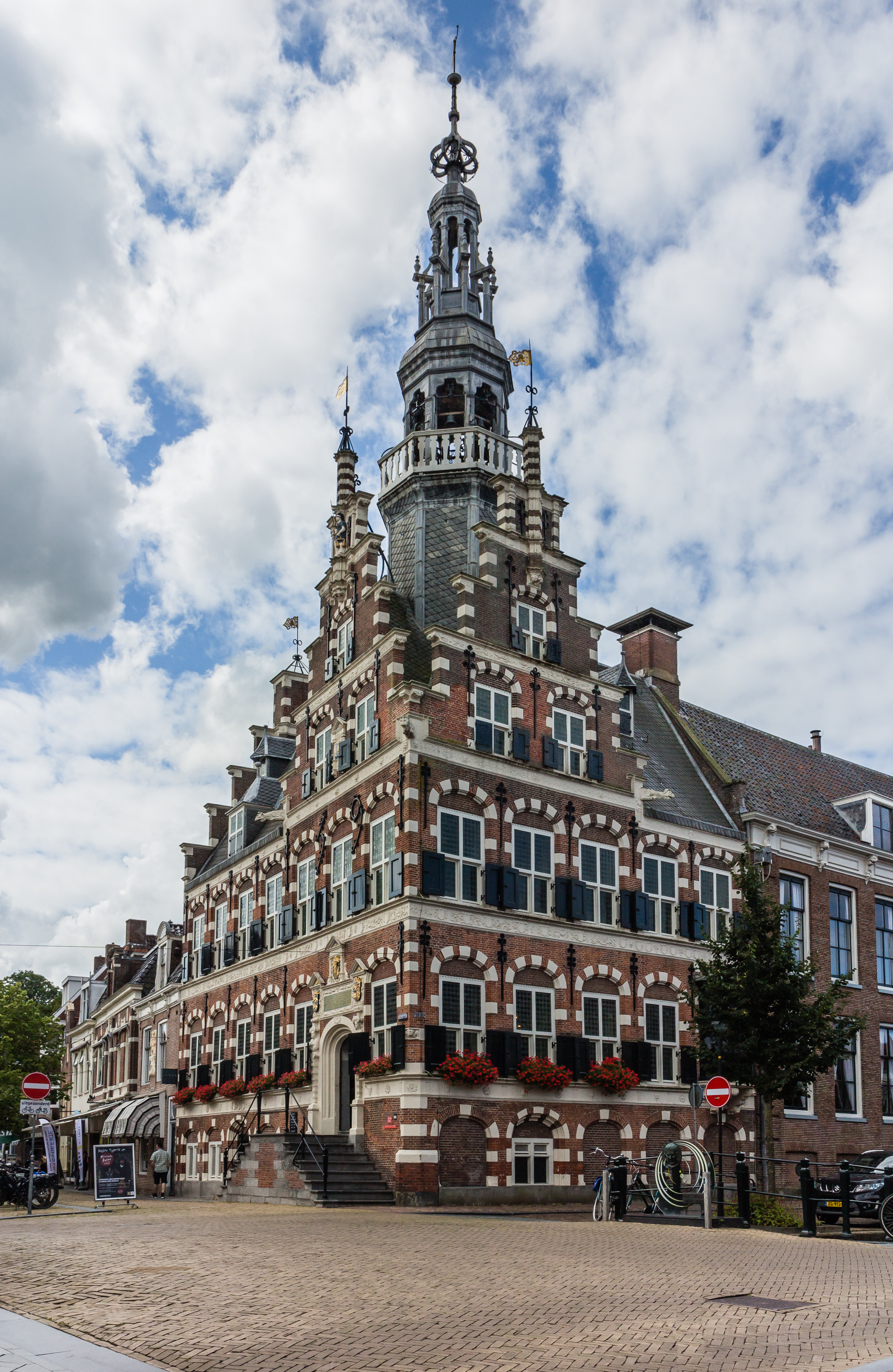
Front and side view.
