= West Poland, Maine =

- Village
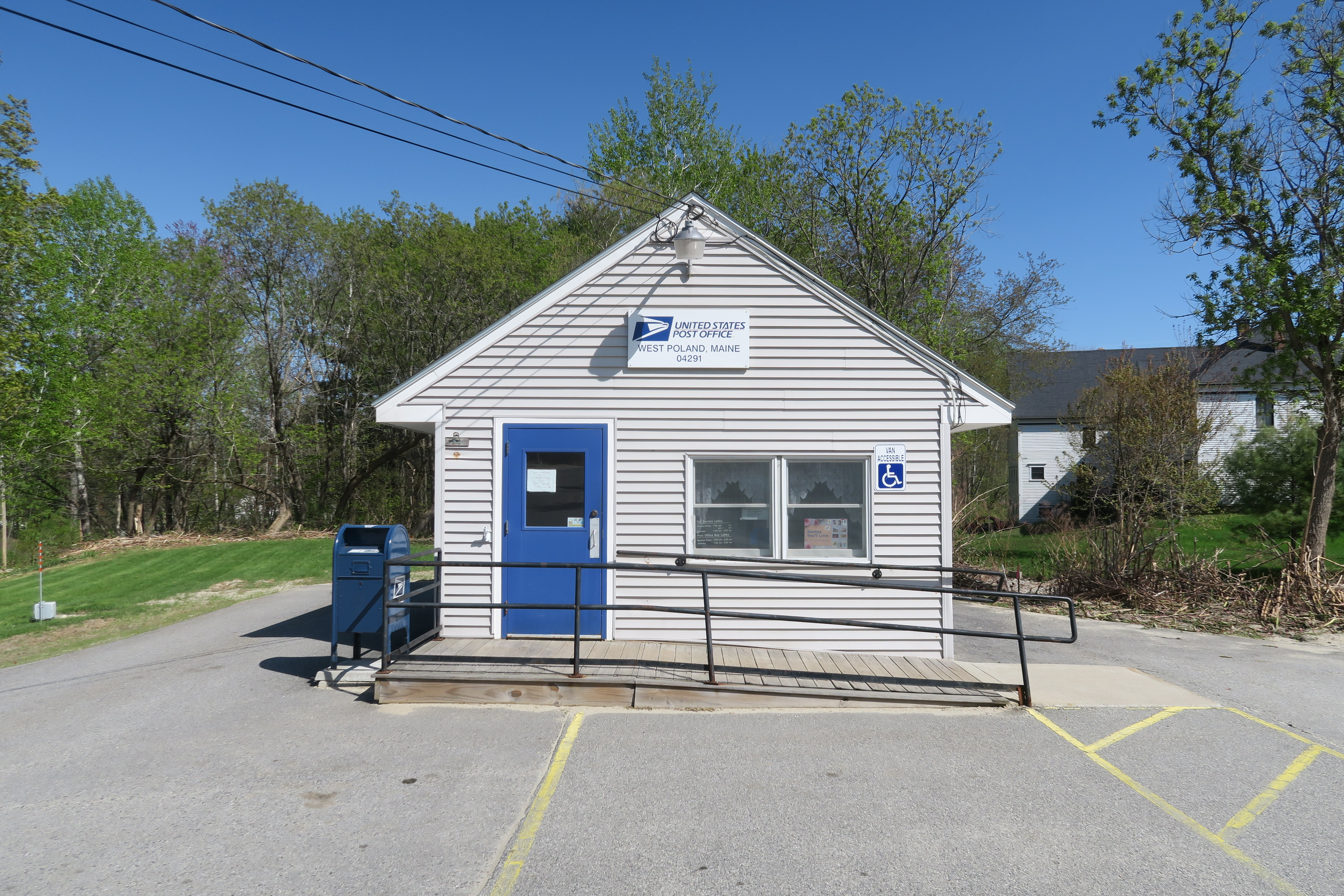
- Post Office

- Location within Maine
- Coordinates: 44°02′08″N 70°26′19″W
- Country: United States
- State: Maine
- County: Androscoggin
- Elevation: 358 ft (109 m)
- Time zone: UTC-5 (Eastern (EST))
  - Summer (DST): UTC-4 (EDT)
- ZIP code: 04291
- Area code: 207
- GNIS feature ID: 578203

West Poland is an unincorporated village in the town of Poland, Androscoggin County, Maine, United States. It is included in the Lewiston-Auburn, Maine metropolitan statistical area. The community is located on the south shore of Tripp Pond, 11.2 miles (18.0 km) west-southwest of Auburn. West Poland has a post office with ZIP code 04291, which opened on May 19, 1837.
