= Irving Gilman Davis =

American educator

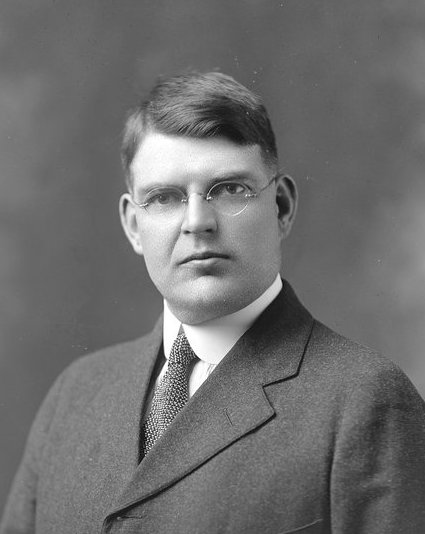
- Born: April 12, 1885; Poland, Maine, US
- Died: March 15, 1939 (aged 53); Storrs, Connecticut, US
- Education: Harvard University (PhD); Bates College (BA)
- Occupations: Economist, educator
- Employer: University of Connecticut
- Title: Professor of Economics
- Term: 1919–1939
- Spouse: Alicia Sawin
- Children: 3

Irving Gilman Davis (1885–1939) was an American educator and agricultural economist who taught at the University of Connecticut (UConn; then Connecticut Agricultural College) from 1915 to 1939. He served as Professor of Economics and department chair starting in 1919.

== Early life and career ==
Davis was born on April 25, 1885, in Poland, Maine, to John Gilman and Juniata (Dunn) Davis. He graduated with a Bachelor of Arts degree in English from Bates College in 1906. He served as high school principal in Cotuit (1906–07) and Shrewsbury (1907–09) in Massachusetts.

Davis resigned to study agriculture at the Massachusetts Agricultural College, completing his studies but suffering health problems that necessitated a lengthy recuperation at the family home in Maine. Resuming teaching in 1912, he taught at the Brimfield Vocational Agricultural School (1913–15).

In 1915, Davis joined the Connecticut Agricultural College's extension service. He worked as assistant county agent leader and received a promotion to county agent leader in 1917. He partnered with farmers across Tolland County to improve farm management practices and awareness of market conditions. In 1917, he launched an economic bulletin that proved so useful to farmers that it was taken up by the state and published for decades. He led publicity for the food committee of the wartime state defense council (1917–18) and served as acting director of the extension service in 1919.

== Academic career ==
In 1919, President Charles L. Beach appointed Davis Professor of Economics and then made him department chair in 1920, following the unplanned departure of both of the full-time economics faculty members. Despite facing skepticism because of his lack of a graduate degree, Davis proved a successful chair and instructor of home economics and agricultural economics. Between 1933 and 1940, the economics department was sixth in the country in the number of its graduates who found positions in the Bureau of Agricultural Economics and the US Department of Agriculture.

During his academic career, Davis continued his work with the college's extension service, doing outreach to farmers, among whom he was widely respected. He was frequently invited to consult with the Connecticut General Assembly about agricultural bills. In 1924 he received a joint appointment as agricultural economist with the Storrs Agricultural Experiment Station. Davis authored or coauthored eight research bulletins for the station over the next fifteen years. He also published numerous articles and book reviews in the Journal of the American Statistical Association and Journal of Farm Economics. As a researcher, Davis specialized in land utilization and the development of cooperatives.

Davis took time throughout his academic career to pursue graduate education. He spent the summers of 1924 and 1925 taking graduate coursework in economics at the University of Wisconsin. He went on sabbatical in 1929–30 to pursue studies at Harvard University and finally earned his PhD in economics from Harvard in 1937 at the age of 51.

Davis was one of the leaders in organizing the New England Research Council on Marketing and Food Supply and the New England Institute of Cooperation. In the 1930s, Davis chaired the agriculture advisory committee of the Social Science Research Council. In December 1938, Davis was elected president of the American Farm Economic Association.

== Personal life ==
Davis generally went by his initials, I. G. He married Alice Sawin in Brimfield, Massachusetts, in 1914, shortly before moving to Connecticut. The couple had three children.

Davis suffered from hypertension and other heart problems for most of his life. He died of a heart attack at his Storrs home on March 15, 1939. He was interred at Storrs Cemetery following a funeral attended by over three hundred mourners. Classes were suspended so that students could attend. The state assembly adjourned for a day to commemorate Davis's death.
