= Moncena Dunn (soldier) =

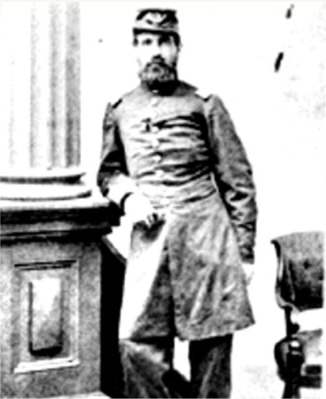
- Moncena Dunn, ca 1861
- Born: September 17, 1822; Poland, Maine
- Died: June 30, 1895 (aged 72); West Roxbury, Massachusetts
- Known for: service in Union Army during Civil War, especially at the Battle of Fredericksburg, and for postwar testimony before Congress
- Spouse: Mary N Hicks
- Children: Lizzie S. Dunn (b 1853); Edwin W. Dunn (b 1859)

for the inventor of the fraud proof coupon ballot, please see Moncena Dunn (inventor)

Moncena Dunn (born Poland, Maine Sept 17, 1822, died West Roxbury, Massachusetts June 30, 1895, age 71), was a bookkeeper and cutler inducted into the Union Army. Dunn was severely wounded at the Battle of Fredericksburg, and is known for his postwar testimony before Congress about the harsh, murderous conditions in Confederate prison camps.

== Early life ==
Dunn was the son of Eliphalet Dunn and Hannah Edwards Sawyer. He worked as a cutler, bookkeeper and one of the first managers of the Bangor House Hotel (1849).

== Army career ==
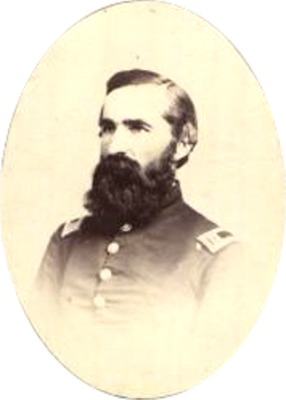
Major Moncena Dunn, ca 1864

Moncena Dunn was inducted into the Union Army, August 22, 1861, age 38, as first Lieutenant, Company D. 19th Massachusetts Volunteer Infantry. He fought in the Battle of Fredericksburg and was with the regimental chaplain, Arthur Buckminster Fuller, when Fuller was killed by enemy fire.

"I saw him for the first time in the streets of Fredericksburg," Dunn recounted. Fuller asked permission to join Dunn's unit. Dunn replied that "there never was a better time than the present." Dunn ordered Fuller to fill a place on the left of the skirmish line. "I have seldom seen a person on the field so calm and mild in his demeanor, evidently not acting from impulse of martial rage," Dunn recalled. "His position was directly in front of a grocery store. He fell in five minutes after he took it, having fired [his rifle] once or twice." Fuller had been killed instantly. Dunn himself was severely wounded in the thigh.

Dunn was captured June 22, 1864, near Petersburg, Virginia, and held prisoner under very harsh conditions in Confederate prison camps, including Andersonville. He witnessed one of his officers shot dead at a camp near Columbia, South Carolina, Camp Sorghum, when the man crossed the dead line:

"Around this camp was an imaginary line called the dead-line. About one rod beyond that, the line of sentinels was posted with orders to shoot any man who stepped over this imaginary line without permission. One day while we were waiting for the guard to be posted...one of our officers stood two feet inside of the deadline and the guard said to him "get back there;" he replied that he was not over the dead-line. The guard deliberately drew up his gun and shot him dead."

Dunn was promoted to Full Captain on 18 Jun 1862, promoted to Full Major on 28 Feb 1864, promoted to Full Lieutenant Colonel (Not Mustered) on 28 July 1864, and mustered Out Company D, 19th Infantry Regiment Massachusetts on 19 July 1865.

== Post-war congressional testimony ==
Dunn saw General John H. Winder inspect the Columbia, South Carolina prison camp in which Dunn was held. Dunn testified before the Congressional Committee of the House of Representatives for the Treatment of Prisoners of War and Union Citizens that Winder and other high officers were well aware of the starvation rations and harsh conditions. Dunn also described to the committee the Confederates' use of bloodhounds to track down escaped Union Army prisoners.

== Final years and family ==
Dunn worked as a customs house clerk after the war and died of heart disease in Massachusetts in 1895. He was a brother of Wallace Dunn (1827–1907) and uncle of inventor Moncena Dunn.
