= Fryeburg Water Company =

Water utility in Maine, United States

The Fryeburg Water Company is a privately owned utility in the town of Fryeburg, Maine. The water company operates Evergreen Spring, which provides a sizable amount of the water used by Poland Spring.

== Controversy ==
The Fryeburg Water Company was ordered by the New Hampshire Utilities Commission (NHPUC) to provide the residents of East Conway, New Hampshire with Poland Spring bottled water (incidentally, the water that the utility sold to the Nestlé subsidiary) until the company fixed a pipeline that brought water from the spring in Maine to the homes in New Hampshire.

The Fryeburg Water Co. announced that they would fix it in the future, probably in 2008. Shortly after, they announced the sale of the pipeline to another company, which would probably not fix it until 2009 or 2010. That company has taken over the responsibility of providing water to the area's residents.

In 2005, the town of Fryeburg voted to buy the Fryeburg Water Co. and establish a publicly owned water district.

In 2014, the Maine Public Utilities Commission voted to allow Fryeburg to sell the town's water to Poland Spring.
