= East Poland, Maine =

- Village
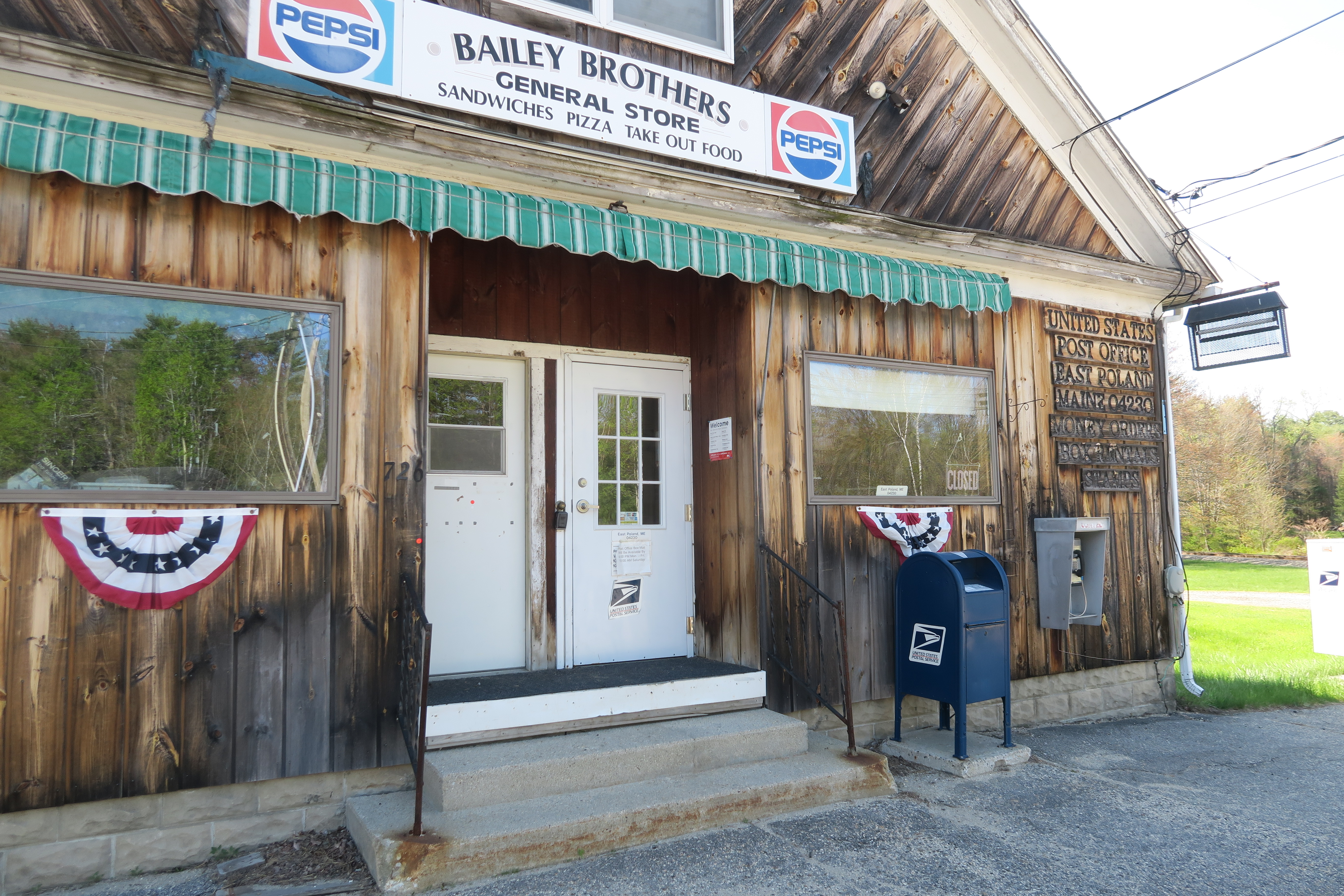
- Bailey Brothers General Store

- Location within Maine
- Coordinates: 44°04′14″N 70°19′41″W
- Country: United States
- State: Maine
- County: Androscoggin
- Elevation: 285 ft (87 m)
- Time zone: UTC-5 (Eastern (EST))
  - Summer (DST): UTC-4 (EDT)
- ZIP code: 04230
- Area code: 207
- GNIS feature ID: 565666

East Poland is an unincorporated village in the town of Poland, Androscoggin County, Maine, United States. It is included in the Lewiston-Auburn, Maine metropolitan statistical area. The community is 5.2 miles (8.4 km) west-southwest of Auburn. East Poland has a post office with ZIP code 04230, which opened on September 4, 1826.
