= Hiram W. Ricker Sr. =

Hiram W. Ricker Sr. (September 5, 1857 - November 19, 1930) was an American hotelier from Maine. Ricker was a founder of the Poland Spring Resort in Poland, Maine.
