= The Dutch House (Brookline, Massachusetts) =

Historic house in Massachusetts, United States

- U.S. National Register of Historic Places
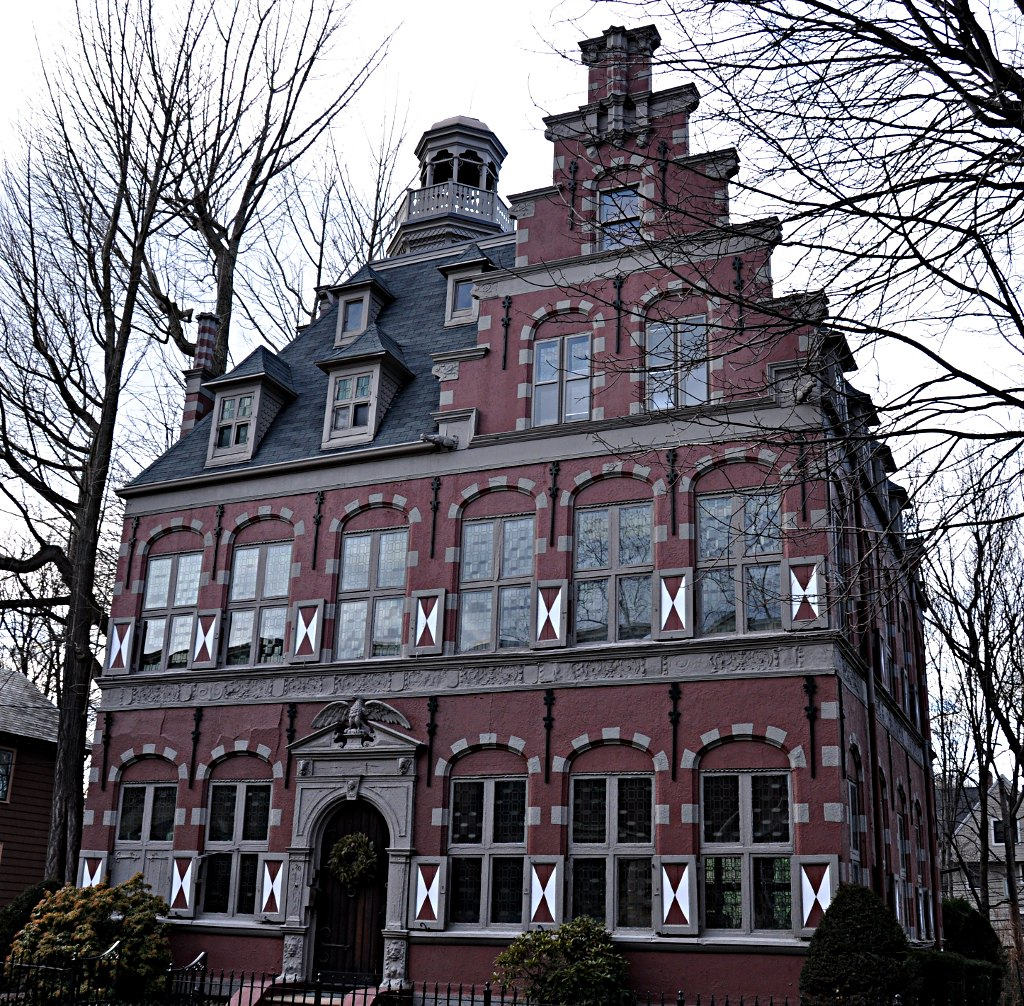

- Location within Massachusetts Location within the United States
- Location: 20 Netherlands Rd., Brookline, Massachusetts
- Coordinates: 42.33593°N 71.11245°W
- Built: 1893
- Architectural style: Dutch High Renaissance
- MPS: Brookline MRA
- NRHP reference No.: 86000093
- Added to NRHP: January 24, 1986

The Dutch House is a historic multi-unit residential building at 20 Netherlands Road in Brookline, Massachusetts. This four-story brick building was originally built as an exhibition hall at the 1893 World's Fair in Chicago, where it served as the Dutch Cocoa House. It is a close copy of the Franeker City Hall in Franeker, Netherlands. The door frame, embellished with stone animals, is a replica of the Enkhuizen Orphanage. The building's interior is highly ornate, with massive ceiling beams and Flemish wooden panels. The original dining room included classic blue and white Delftware tiles, some more than 300 years old. The exterior has a high mansard roof that extends over two floors, and has stepped gables. The windows include more than 12,000 individual lights of leaded green glass.

The building was erected at the World's Fair by the Van Houten Cocoa Company, and was one of the few privately built fair buildings to win a medal. After the fair ended, the building was purchased by Brookline resident Charles Brooks Appleton, who had seen it there. The building was dismantled brick by brick and reconstructed at its present location, although some of its brickwork was covered by cement in imitation of stonework. It was placed on the National Register of Historic Places in 1986. Netherlands Road was named in honor of the house. Because it was built by the Netherlands and is a copy of a Dutch building, it is considered one of the finest examples of Dutch High Renaissance styling in the nation.

== See also ==
- National Register of Historic Places listings in Brookline, Massachusetts
