= Poland Spring =

American bottled water company

- Market: Northeastern United States
- Produced by: Primo Brands
- Introduced: 1845; 181 years ago
- Tagline: "Born Better"
- Type: Still
- pH: 5.4–7.3
- Bromine (Br): 0–0.014
- Calcium (Ca): 3.7–12
- Chloride (Cl): 0–14
- Fluoride (F): 0–0.25
- Magnesium (Mg): 0.67–1.6
- Nitrate (NO_{3}): 0
- Potassium (K): 0
- Sodium (Na): 1.6–9.1
- Sulfate (SO_{4}): 0–8.1
- TDS: 0–74
- Website: www.polandspring.com
- All concentrations in milligrams per liter (mg/L); pH without units

Poland Spring is a brand of bottled water sold primarily in the Northeastern United States. Founded in 1845, it is named after the natural spring in Poland, Maine, from which the brand's water was originally drawn. It is currently part of the portfolio of Tampa-based beverage company Primo Brands.

Poland Spring water is derived from multiple sources in Maine, including Poland Spring and Garden Spring in Poland, Clear Spring in Hollis, Evergreen Spring in Fryeburg, Spruce Spring in Pierce Pond Township, White Cedar Spring in Dallas Plantation, Bradbury Spring in Kingfield, and Cold Springs in Denmark.

== History ==
Commercial interest in the eponymous spring dates back to the late 18th century. In 1797, the Wentworth Ricker Inn opened at the homestead of Jabez Ricker in present-day Poland, Maine. In 1844, Jabez's grandson, Hiram W. Ricker claimed that spring water from the property cured him of chronic dyspepsia. In 1861, the inn was enlarged and renamed The Mansion House. The inn had grown to a resort, and his discussions with guests led them to also praise the drinking water. In this period, it was quite fashionable to "take the waters" for almost all illnesses, causing an uptick in business. The Rickers soon began bottling the water. Expanded again into an extravagant resort that locals dubbed "Ricker's Folly", the inn was renamed the Poland Spring House and opened on July 4, 1876. The buildings now known as the Poland Spring Bottling Plant and Spring House were built in 1907. The inn remained a significant resort into the early 20th century, but the Ricker family lost control of the company during the 1930s. A resort still operates on the site.

Poland Spring operated independently until it was purchased by the Perrier Water Company in 1980. In 1992, Nestlé acquired Poland Spring when it took over the Perrier brand. In March 2021, Nestlé completed a $4.3 billion deal selling its North American bottled water brands, including Poland Spring, to a private equity group that adopted the name BlueTriton Brands. In November 2024, BlueTriton merged with Primo Water, and the combined entity Primo Brands began trading on the NYSE under ticker symbol PRMB.

== Water sales ==
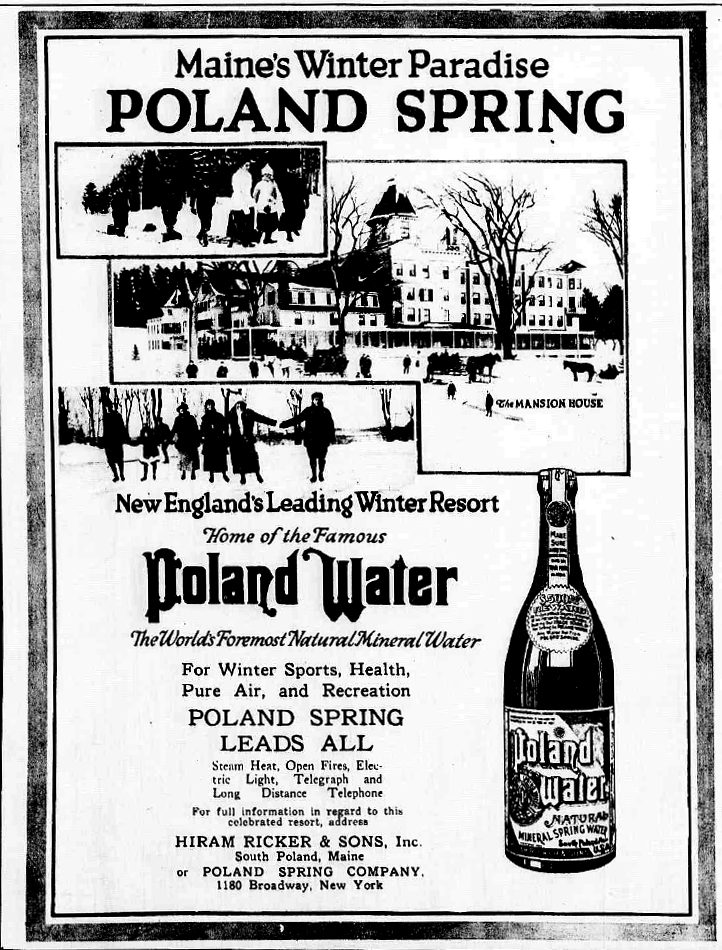
1919 ad for the water and the resort

All Poland Spring products are sold in plastic bottles, for both safety and economic reasons. As of 2011, no portable Poland Spring bottles were made from the number "7" polycarbonate plastic that contains Bisphenol-A (BPA). The large 5-gallon bottles are made of number "1" plastic and are also BPA-free, while the 3-gallon bottles are made of number "7" plastic and may contain trace levels of BPA.

By November 2007, Poland Spring changed to a lighter bottle called the Eco-Shape which uses 30 percent less plastic.

== Controversies ==
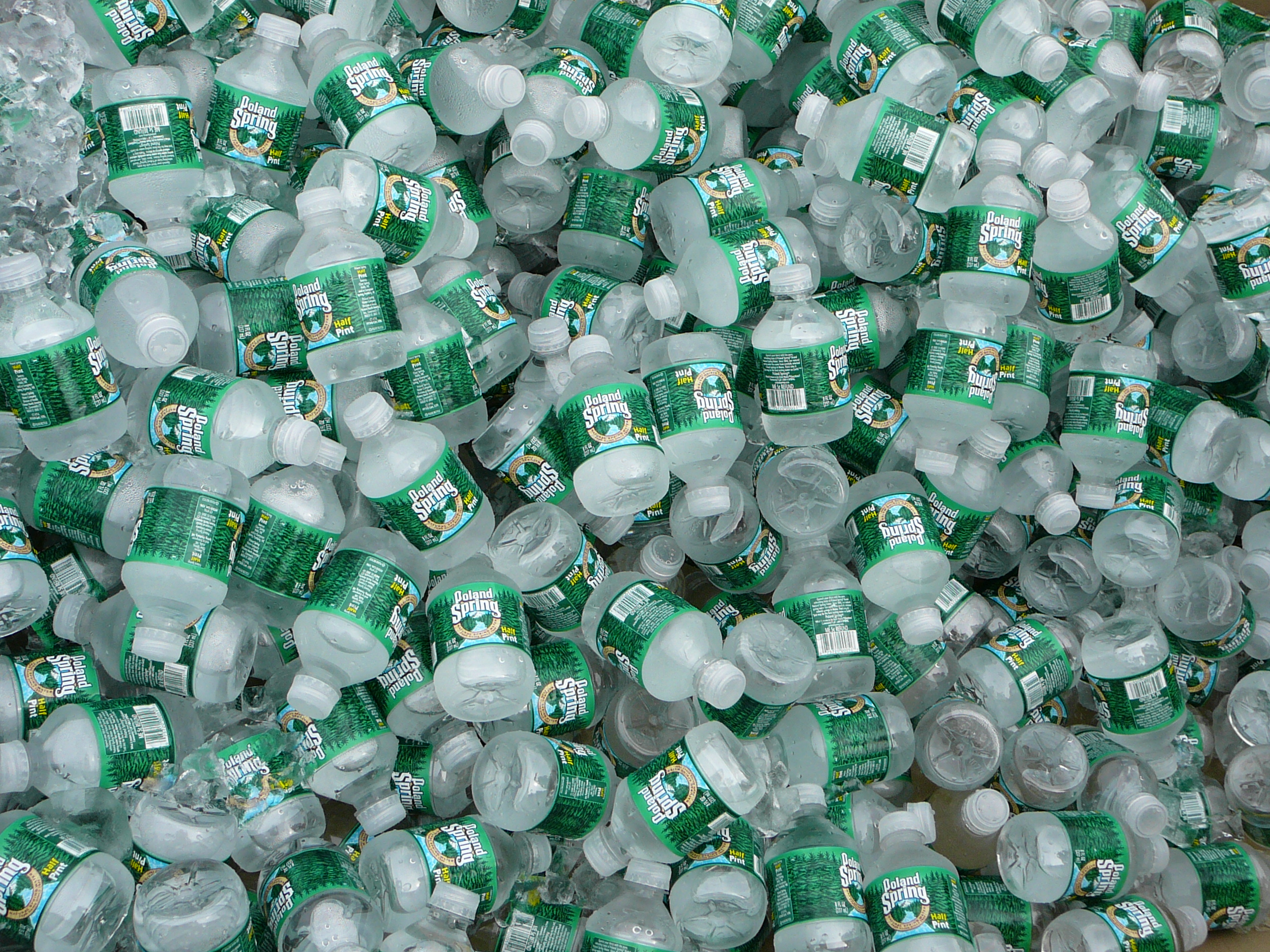
A large pile of half-pint Poland Spring bottles

Several towns in Maine have objected to the business practices of Poland Spring and its parent company Nestlé. In some towns, such as Fryeburg, Maine, Poland Spring actually buys the water (110 million gallons of water from Fryeburg a year) from another company, the Fryeburg Water Co., and ships it to the Poland Spring bottling plant in Poland Spring. However, Fryeburg Water Co. also sells water to the town of Fryeburg.

The town of Fryeburg began to question the amount of water the company was selling to Poland Spring. In 2004, the town's water stopped temporarily because of a pump failure, but Poland Spring's operations were able to continue. That year, the group H_{2}O for ME began gathering support to create a tax on water drawn for commercial purposes. Poland Spring claimed the tax would force the company into bankruptcy.

In June 2003, Poland Spring was sued for false advertising in a class action lawsuit charging that their water is not spring water but is in fact heavily treated common ground water. The suit also states that hydro-geologists hired by Nestlé found that another current source for Poland Spring water near the original site stands over a former trash and refuse dump and below an illegal disposal site where human sewage was sprayed as fertilizer for many years. The suit was settled in September 2003, with the company not admitting to the allegations, but agreeing to pay $10 million in charity donations and discounts over the next five years. Nestlé continues to sell the same Maine water under the Poland Spring name.

In August 2017, a class-action lawsuit was filed in Connecticut alleging that "Not one drop of Poland Spring Water emanates from a water source that complies with the Food and Drug Administration definition of 'spring water'. The famous Poland Spring in Poland Spring, Maine, which defendant's labels claim is a source of Poland Spring Water, ran dry nearly 50 years ago." A Poland Spring spokeswoman responded that "Poland Spring is 100 percent spring water. The claims made in the lawsuit are without merit and an obvious attempt to manipulate the legal system for personal gain." Scientist Peter Gleick said that "Most of Nestle's waters are pumped from the ground, but the bigger issue that the regulatory definition of what really counts as spring water is really weak. No one is really looking over the shoulders of the bottled water companies."

In March 2019, the district court judge dismissed the claims in the class-action lawsuit in Vermont out of the nine northeastern states in favor of Nestle. The class-action was still ongoing as of January 2025.

== Liquor brand ==
The Poland Spring brand name is also used on vodka and gin produced by the Sazerac Company, distributed by Boston-based beverage company M.S. Walker, Inc., and sold at liquor stores throughout the Northeastern United States.

== In popular culture ==
A Poland Spring water bottle was cited by Lil Yachty as the inspiration for his 2022 song "Poland", which peaked at 40 on the Billboard Hot 100.

== See also ==
- Poland Spring Bottling Plant and Spring House
