= Poland, Maine =

Town in Maine, United States

- Town
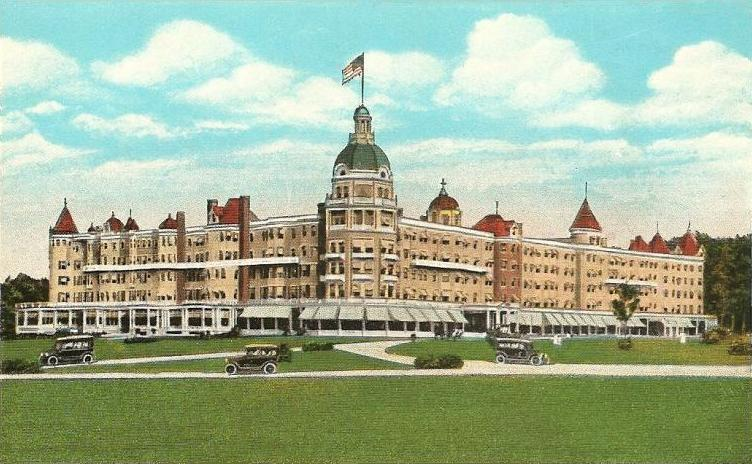
- The Poland Spring House (1876–1975)

- Seal

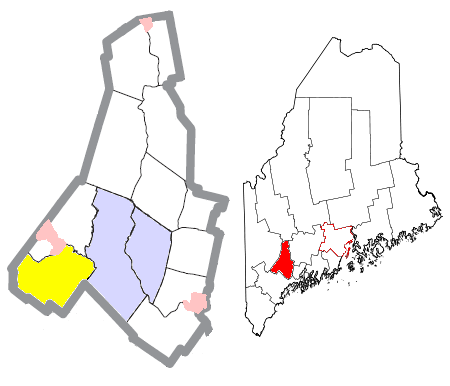
- Location of Poland (in yellow) in Androscoggin County and the state of Maine
- Coordinates: 44°02′47″N 70°21′54″W
- Country: United States
- State: Maine
- County: Androscoggin
- Incorporated: 1795
- Villages: Poland; East Poland; Empire; Hackett Mills; Moussam; Poland Spring; South Poland; West Poland

Area
  - Total: 47.19 sq mi (122.22 km^{2})
  - Land: 42.23 sq mi (109.38 km^{2})
  - Water: 4.96 sq mi (12.85 km^{2})
- Elevation: 407 ft (124 m)

Population (2020)
  - Total: 5,906
  - Density: 140/sq mi (54/km^{2})
- Time zone: UTC-5 (Eastern (EST))
  - Summer (DST): UTC-4 (EDT)
- ZIP Codes: 04274 (Poland); 04230 (East Poland); 04291 (West Poland)
- Area code: 207
- FIPS code: 23-60020
- GNIS feature ID: 582680
- Website: www.polandtownoffice.org

Poland is a town in Androscoggin County, Maine, United States. The population was 5,906 at the 2020 census. Élan School, a private 8–12 behavior modification boarding school that conducted acts of abuse and torture against the children who were its wards, was established in Poland in 1970 and remained open until 2011 in spite of countless instances of abuse and a conspiracy to cover up the criminal acts of various people who were involved, which included the police.

Set among rolling hills and numerous lakes, the town is home to Range Ponds State Park, which includes hiking trails and a pristine freshwater beach. Poland is also a historic resort area. It is included in the Lewiston-Auburn, Maine Metropolitan Statistical Area, which itself is part of the Greater Portland-Lewiston Combined Statistical Area.

== History ==
Land was granted by the Massachusetts General Court in 1765 to officers and soldiers who served with Sir William Phips in the 1690 Battle of Quebec. It replaced a 1736 grant made to them called Bakerstown (now Salisbury, New Hampshire) which was ruled invalid in 1741 at the separation of New Hampshire from Massachusetts. The new plantation was also called Bakerstown (after Captain Thomas Baker), and included present-day Poland, Minot, Mechanic Falls and the greater part of Auburn.

Settled in 1767 by Nathaniel Bailey and Daniel Lane, Bakerstown Plantation would be incorporated as Poland on February 17, 1795. Poland is named after an "ancient melody" of the same name, though one historian mentions a Sokoki chief named Polan who had lived in the area before the town's founding.

At the beginning, Poland was an agricultural town, with 600 acres (2.4 km^{2}) of the best land farmed by the Shakers who settled at Poland Hill, north of the Sabbathday Lake Shaker Village in New Gloucester. Called the North Family of Shakers, the village was founded by members who moved from Gorham in 1819. The village lasted until 1887.

Industry was attracted to Poland's water power sites. In 1859, when the population was 2,660, it had four sawmills, a gristmill, a tannery and a carriage factory. The St. Lawrence and Atlantic Railroad passed through the northeastern corner of the town, spurring development and bringing tourists drawn to its scenic ponds and gentle hills. By 1893, when Mechanic Falls was set off as a separate town, Poland had evolved into a Gilded Age resort town.

In 1797, The Wentworth Ricker Inn in South Poland opened at the homestead Jabez Ricker, acquired from a 1794 land swap with the Alfred Shaker Village in Alfred. But when the railroad replaced stage travel, patronage declined and the inn closed. Then a grandson, Hiram Ricker, began proclaiming that the mineral spring on his family's property had cured his dyspepsia. People began arriving to sample the spring's curative waters, which flow 8 gallons a minute. Reopened in 1861, the inn was enlarged and renamed The Mansion House. But even that property could not handle the crowds of tourists, so in 1875 the family expanded the property, built an extravagant house that was dubbed "Ricker's folly" due to skepticism that such a large property would be successful.

On July 4, 1876, the Poland Spring House opened atop Ricker's Hill, an elevation of 800 feet (244 m) above sea level with magnificent views to the White Mountains. The hotel would be augmented over the years by architects John Calvin Stevens, Albert Winslow Cobb and Harry Wilkerson. It became a self-contained and exclusive spa, with guards at gatehouses instructed to turn away sightseers. With luxurious accommodations for 450 guests, the hotel attracted the rich and famous. Patrons included Gen. Benjamin Butler, Sen. James G. Blaine, Joan Crawford, Jimmy Durante, Jack Paar and Robert Goulet. But following World War II, the era of grand hotels waned. When the Rickers sold the Poland Spring House, its new owners allowed the sprawling facilities to deteriorate. Apollo Industries purchased the hotel in 1963 and converted it to the largest Women's Job Corps facility in the United States. The Job Corps dormitory was vacated in 1969, and was destroyed by a spectacular fire on July 3, 1975.

Today, the water is bottled and sold as Poland Spring water by BlueTriton Brands.

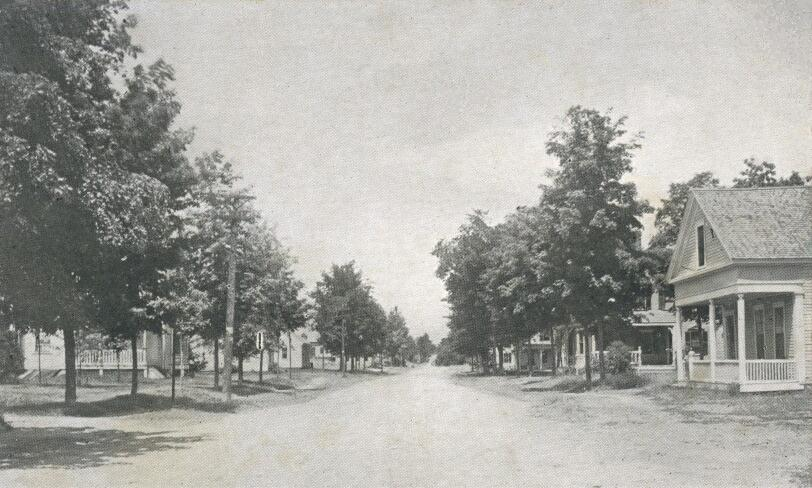
View of Poland, looking north, c. 1905

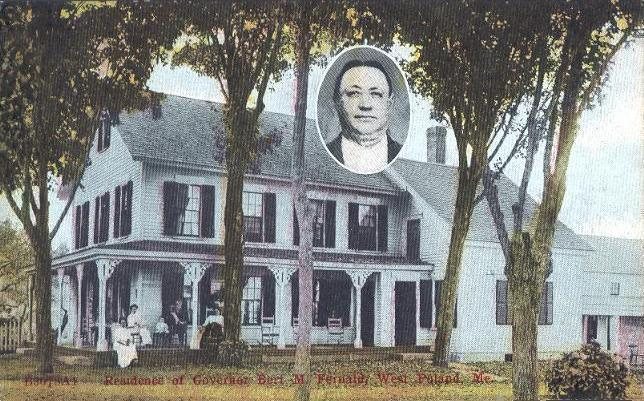
Home of Gov. Fernald c. 1910

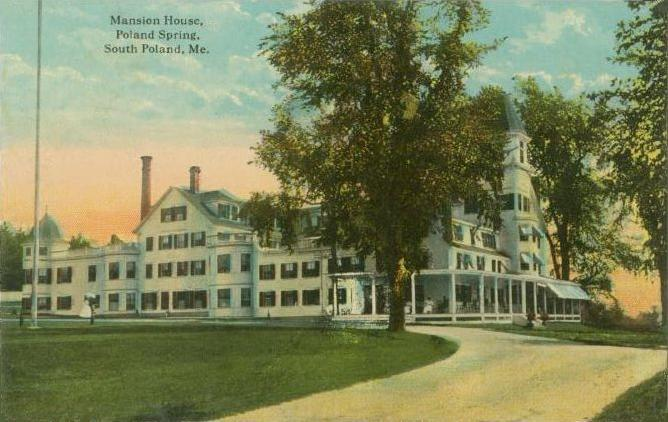
The Mansion House in 1915

=== 1978 P-3 Orion crash ===
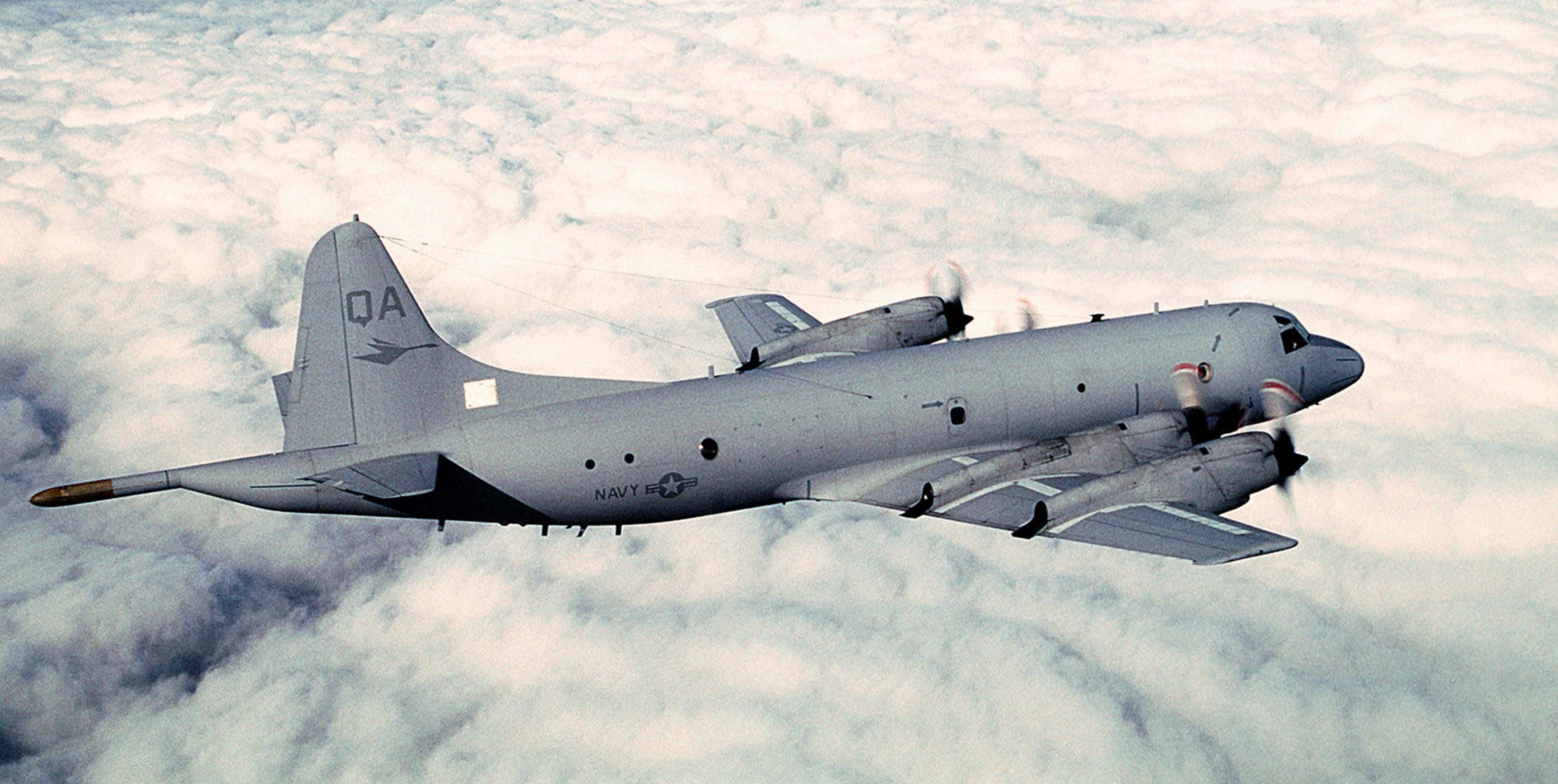
P-3 Orion similar to the one which fell on Tripp Corner.

Poland was the site of one of the last major accidents involving aircraft from Maine's Cold War air bases. A United States Navy patrol bomber from Naval Air Station Brunswick Patrol Squadron 8 (VP-8) disintegrated over Poland on September 22, 1978. An over-pressurized fuel tank caused the port wing of the Lockheed P-3 Orion to separate at the outboard engine. The detached wing sheared off part of the tail; and aerodynamic forces caused the remaining engines and starboard wing to detach from the fuselage. Debris rained down over a wide area near the Tripp Corner intersection on Route 11 shortly after noon. No homes were hit, but an explosive fuel-air fire following impact broke some windows. There were no survivors from the plane's eight-man crew.

== Geography ==
According to the United States Census Bureau, the town has a total area of 47.19 square miles (122.22 km^{2}), of which 42.23 square miles (109.38 km^{2}) is land and 4.96 square miles (12.85 km^{2}) is water. Poland is drained by the Little Androscoggin River.

The town is crossed by state routes 11, 26 and 122. It is bordered by the towns of Mechanic Falls to the north, Minot to the northeast, Auburn to the east, New Gloucester to the southeast, Casco and Raymond to the southwest, and Otisfield and Oxford to the northwest.

=== Tripp Pond ===
Tripp Pond
- Location within Maine
- Coordinates: 44°03′N 70°26′W
- Max. length: 2.6 mi (4.2 km)
- Surface area: 735 acres (297 ha)
- Max. depth: 36 feet (11 m)
- Water volume: 9,237 acre⋅ft (11,394,000 m^{3})
- Surface elevation: 305 ft (93 m)

Tripp Pond is on the west side of Maine State Route 11, which provides shoulder parking for public access to the east shore of the pond. There is a ramp for trailered boats at the south end of the pond. Summer water temperatures are too high for trout, but the pond provides good habitat for white perch and largemouth bass. The north end of the pond overflows through a series of shallow ponds to the Little Androscoggin River near Welchville in the town of Oxford, Maine 5 miles (8.0 km) to the north.

=== Climate ===
This climatic region is typified by large seasonal temperature differences, with warm to hot (and often humid) summers and cold (sometimes severely cold) winters. According to the Köppen climate classification system, Poland has a humid continental climate, Dfb on climate maps.

Climate data for Poland, Maine, 1991–2020 normals, extremes 2000–present
Month	Jan	Feb	Mar	Apr	May	Jun	Jul	Aug	Sep	Oct	Nov	Dec	Year
Record high °F (°C)	62 (17)	66 (19)	83 (28)	90 (32)	91 (33)	95 (35)	94 (34)	96 (36)	95 (35)	82 (28)	73 (23)	65 (18)	96 (36)
Mean maximum °F (°C)	51.5 (10.8)	49.4 (9.7)	59.1 (15.1)	75.3 (24.1)	84.8 (29.3)	88.2 (31.2)	89.9 (32.2)	88.9 (31.6)	85.5 (29.7)	73.9 (23.3)	64.0 (17.8)	53.7 (12.1)	92.0 (33.3)
Mean daily maximum °F (°C)	27.4 (−2.6)	30.2 (−1.0)	38.2 (3.4)	51.7 (10.9)	63.5 (17.5)	73.1 (22.8)	78.0 (25.6)	77.1 (25.1)	68.9 (20.5)	55.9 (13.3)	43.8 (6.6)	33.5 (0.8)	53.4 (11.9)
Daily mean °F (°C)	19.0 (−7.2)	21.3 (−5.9)	29.4 (−1.4)	41.7 (5.4)	53.3 (11.8)	62.6 (17.0)	68.2 (20.1)	66.9 (19.4)	58.6 (14.8)	46.7 (8.2)	35.9 (2.2)	25.9 (−3.4)	44.1 (6.8)
Mean daily minimum °F (°C)	10.6 (−11.9)	12.4 (−10.9)	20.5 (−6.4)	31.7 (−0.2)	43.0 (6.1)	52.0 (11.1)	58.5 (14.7)	56.6 (13.7)	48.3 (9.1)	37.5 (3.1)	28.0 (−2.2)	18.3 (−7.6)	34.8 (1.6)
Mean minimum °F (°C)	−5.2 (−20.7)	−2.2 (−19.0)	4.7 (−15.2)	23.1 (−4.9)	34.0 (1.1)	43.3 (6.3)	51.8 (11.0)	48.5 (9.2)	37.0 (2.8)	28.6 (−1.9)	15.5 (−9.2)	3.0 (−16.1)	−7.4 (−21.9)
Record low °F (°C)	−16 (−27)	−19 (−28)	−6 (−21)	14 (−10)	30 (−1)	35 (2)	45 (7)	44 (7)	30 (−1)	23 (−5)	2 (−17)	−10 (−23)	−19 (−28)
Average precipitation inches (mm)	3.11 (79)	3.00 (76)	3.67 (93)	4.38 (111)	3.70 (94)	4.92 (125)	4.00 (102)	3.91 (99)	3.96 (101)	5.94 (151)	4.42 (112)	4.20 (107)	49.21 (1,250)
Average snowfall inches (cm)	18.0 (46)	20.5 (52)	14.8 (38)	4.2 (11)	0.1 (0.25)	0.0 (0.0)	0.0 (0.0)	0.0 (0.0)	0.0 (0.0)	1.4 (3.6)	3.8 (9.7)	17.3 (44)	80.1 (204.55)
Average precipitation days (≥ 0.01 in)	10.0	9.3	9.8	12.3	14.1	15.1	12.8	12.2	10.5	13.1	11.5	11.3	142.0
Average snowy days (≥ 0.1 in)	8.5	7.3	5.4	2.0	0.1	0.0	0.0	0.0	0.0	0.2	2.4	6.8	32.7
Source 1: NOAA
Source 2: National Weather Service (mean maxima/minima 2006–2020)

== Demographics ==
Historical population
Census	Pop.	Note	%±
1800	2,125		—
1810	850		−60.0%
1820	1,353		59.2%
1830	1,916		41.6%
1840	2,360		23.2%
1850	2,660		12.7%
1860	2,746		3.2%
1870	2,436		−11.3%
1880	2,442		0.2%
1890	2,472		1.2%
1900	1,648		−33.3%
1910	1,382		−16.1%
1920	1,399		1.2%
1930	1,503		7.4%
1940	1,441		−4.1%
1950	1,503		4.3%
1960	1,537		2.3%
1970	2,015		31.1%
1980	3,578		77.6%
1990	4,342		21.4%
2000	4,866		12.1%
2010	5,376		10.5%
2020	5,906		9.9%
U.S. Decennial Census

=== 2010 census ===
As of the census of 2010, there were 5,376 people, 2,140 households, and 1,581 families living in the town. The population density was 127.3 inhabitants per square mile (49.2/km^{2}). There were 2,679 housing units at an average density of 63.4 per square mile (24.5/km^{2}). The racial makeup of the town was 97.4% White, 0.4% African American, 0.3% Native American, 0.4% Asian, 0.2% from other races, and 1.3% from two or more races. Hispanic or Latino of any race were 0.6% of the population.

There were 2,140 households, of which 31.5% had children under the age of 18 living with them, 59.6% were married couples living together, 8.9% had a female householder with no husband present, 5.4% had a male householder with no wife present, and 26.1% were non-families. 18.5% of all households were made up of individuals, and 6.4% had someone living alone who was 65 years of age or older. The average household size was 2.49 and the average family size was 2.81.

The median age in the town was 43.4 years. 22.2% of residents were under the age of 18; 5.8% were between the ages of 18 and 24; 24.7% were from 25 to 44; 35% were from 45 to 64; and 12.2% were 65 years of age or older. The gender makeup of the town was 50.0% male and 50.0% female.

=== 2000 census ===
Per the census of 2000, there were 4,866 people, 1,845 households, and 1,437 families living in the town.

The median income for a household in the town was $47,824, and the median income for a family was $55,427. Males had a median income of $33,284 versus $23,926 for females. The per capita income for the town was $22,346. About 1.8% of families and 3.4% of the population were below the poverty line, including 2.0% of those under age 18 and 4.7% of those age 65 or over.

Voter registration

Voter Registration and Party Enrollment as of January 2015
Party	Total Voters	Percentage
Unenrolled	1,639	39.7%
Republican	1,207	29.2%
Democratic	1,052	25.5%
Green Independent	230	5.6%
Total	4,128	100%

== Education ==
The Town of Poland is a member of Regional School Unit 16 (RSU 16). Poland Regional High School (PRHS) serves as the district high school of RSU 16 and is open to all high school-age students of Poland, Mechanic Falls, and Minot, Maine. Students from Raymond, Maine, as well, attend PRHS on a tuition basis. The school's athletic teams compete in Maine class "B" athletics. The school's mascot is the knight and the school colors are blue and silver. Connected to the high school is Bruce M. Whittier Middle School. This school serves all three towns' 7th and 8th grade students (as of 2010). Both schools opened in 1999. Poland Community School, last expanded in 2002, serves Poland's K–6 students.

Élan School, a private 8–12 behavior modification boarding school that faced numerous reports of abuse throughout its existence, was established in Poland in 1970 and remained open until 2011.

== Popular culture ==
Two episodes of the popular 1960s television series Route 66 were filmed in Poland: "Come Out, Come Out, Wherever You Are" (1963) starring Lon Chaney Jr.; and "Same Picture, Different Frame" (1963) starring Joan Crawford, Tom Bosley, and Patrick O'Neal.

== Sites of interest ==
- Old Poland Corner Schoolhouse
- Poland Spring Preservation Society
- Range Ponds State Park

== Notable people ==
- John Nevins Andrews, minister, missionary, writer, editor and scholar
- Augustus Burbank, physician, born in Poland
- Eleazer Burbank, physician, father of Augustus, practiced in Poland
- David Boyer, state legislator
- Irving Gilman Davis, economist and educator
- Moncena Dunn, bookkeeper and army officer
- Bert M. Fernald, US senator and 47th governor of Maine
- Jabez K. Walker, Wisconsin assemblyman
- Amos Whitney, founder of Pratt and Whitney
