= 1919 Detroit Tigers season =

Major League Baseball season

1919 Detroit Tigers
- League: American League
- Ballpark: Navin Field
- City: Detroit
- Record: 80–60 (.571)
- League place: 4th
- Owners: Frank Navin
- Managers: Hughie Jennings

The 1919 Detroit Tigers season was a season in American baseball. The team finished fourth in the American League with a record of 80–60, 8 games behind the Chicago White Sox.

== Regular season ==
=== Season standings ===
American League
Team	W	L	Pct.	GB	Home	Road
Chicago White Sox	88	52	.629	—	48‍–‍22	40‍–‍30
Cleveland Indians	84	55	.604	3½	44‍–‍25	40‍–‍30
New York Yankees	80	59	.576	7½	46‍–‍25	34‍–‍34
Detroit Tigers	80	60	.571	8	46‍–‍24	34‍–‍36
St. Louis Browns	67	72	.482	20½	40‍–‍30	27‍–‍42
Boston Red Sox	66	71	.482	20½	35‍–‍30	31‍–‍41
Washington Senators	56	84	.400	32	32‍–‍40	24‍–‍44
Philadelphia Athletics	36	104	.257	52	21‍–‍49	15‍–‍55

=== Record vs. opponents ===
1919 American League record Sources:
Team	BOS	CWS	CLE	DET	NYY	PHA	SLB	WSH
Boston	—	9–11	4–15	9–11	10–9	14–6	9–10–1	11–9
Chicago	11–9	—	12–8	11–9	12–8	17–3	11–9	14–6
Cleveland	15–4	8–12	—	8–12	13–7	16–4	11–9	13–7
Detroit	11–9	9–11	12–8	—	8–12	14–6	14–6	12–8
New York	9–10	8–12	7–13	12–8	—	18–2	12–8	14–6–2
Philadelphia	6–14	3–17	4–16	6–14	2–18	—	7–13	8–12
St. Louis	10–9–1	9–11	9–11	6–14	8–12	13–7	—	12–8
Washington	9–11	6–14	7–13	8–12	6–14–2	12–8	8–12	—

=== Roster ===
1919 Detroit Tigers
Roster
Pitchers: Doc Ayers; Bernie Boland; George Cunningham; Hooks Dauss; Howard Ehmke; Eric Erickson; Bill James; Rudy Kallio; Dutch Leonard; Slim Love; Willie Mitchell	Catchers: Eddie Ainsmith; Oscar Stanage; Archie Yelle; Infielders: Donie Bush; Ben Dyer; Babe Ellison; Harry Heilmann; Bob Jones; Ralph Young	Outfielders: Ty Cobb; Ira Flagstead; Chick Shorten; Bobby Veach; Other positions: Snooks Dowd	Manager: Hughie Jennings; Coaches: Dan Howley

== Player stats ==
=== Batting ===
==== Starters by position ====
Note: Pos = Position; G = Games played; AB = At bats; H = Hits; Avg. = Batting average; HR = Home runs; RBI = Runs batted in

Pos	Player	G	AB	H	Avg.	HR	RBI
C	Eddie Ainsmith	114	364	99	.272	3	35
1B	Harry Heilmann	140	537	172	.320	8	92
2B	Ralph Young	125	456	96	.211	1	26
SS	Donie Bush	129	509	124	.244	0	33
3B	Bob Jones	127	439	114	.260	1	57
OF	Ty Cobb	124	498	191	.384	1	67
OF	Ira Flagstead	97	287	95	.331	5	47
OF	Bobby Veach	139	538	191	.355	3	97

==== Other batters ====
Note: G = Games played; AB = At bats; H = Hits; Avg. = Batting average; HR = Home runs; RBI = Runs batted in

Player	G	AB	H	Avg.	HR	RBI
Chick Shorten	95	270	85	.315	0	26
Babe Ellison	56	134	29	.216	0	13
Oscar Stanage	38	120	29	.242	1	16
Ben Dyer	44	85	21	.247	0	15
Archie Yelle	6	4	0	.000	0	0
Snooks Dowd	1	0	0	----	0	0

=== Pitching ===
==== Starting pitchers ====
Note: G = Games pitched; IP = Innings pitched; W = Wins; L = Losses; ERA = Earned run average; SO = Strikeouts

Player	G	IP	W	L	ERA	SO
Hooks Dauss	34	256.1	21	9	3.55	73
Howard Ehmke	33	248.2	17	10	3.18	79
Bernie Boland	35	242.2	14	16	3.04	71
Dutch Leonard	29	217.1	14	13	2.77	102

==== Other pitchers ====
Note: G = Games pitched; IP = Innings pitched; W = Wins; L = Losses; ERA = Earned run average; SO = Strikeouts

Player	G	IP	W	L	ERA	SO
Doc Ayers	24	93.2	5	3	2.69	32
Slim Love	22	89.2	6	4	3.01	46
Eric Erickson	3	14.2	0	2	6.75	4
Willie Mitchell	3	13.2	1	2	5.27	4
Bill James	2	9.1	1	0	5.79	3

==== Relief pitchers ====
Note: G = Games pitched; W = Wins; L = Losses; SV = Saves; ERA = Earned run average; SO = Strikeouts

Player	G	W	L	SV	ERA	SO
George Cunningham	17	1	1	1	4.91	11
Rudy Kallio	12	0	0	1	5.64	3
