= 1915 Detroit Tigers season =

Major League Baseball season

1915 Detroit Tigers
- League: American League
- Ballpark: Navin Field
- City: Detroit, Michigan
- Record: 100–54 (.649)
- League place: 2nd
- Owners: William H. Yawkey and Frank Navin
- Managers: Hughie Jennings

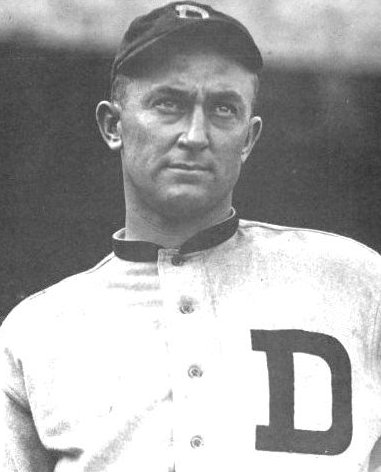
Ty Cobb, 1914

The 1915 Detroit Tigers won a club-record 100 games and narrowly lost the American League pennant to the Boston Red Sox, who won 101 games. Though four other Tigers teams have won 100 games (1934, 1961, 1968, and 1984), only the 1934 Tigers had a better winning percentage. The 1915 Detroit Tigers team is remembered for its all-star outfield of Ty Cobb, Sam Crawford, and Bobby Veach—who finished #1, #2, and #3 in the American League in both runs batted in and total bases. Baseball historian Bill James ranks the Tigers' 1915 outfield as the best in major league history.

== Offseason ==
- January 7, 1915: The Tigers sold Wally Pipp and Hugh High to the Yankees for a reported $5,000 each.

== Regular season ==
The 1915 Tigers' winning percentage of .649 ranks as the 2nd best in team history, as follows:

Best Seasons in Detroit Tigers History
Rank	Year	Wins	Losses	Win %	Finish
1	1934	101	53	.656	Lost 1934 World Series to Cardinals
2	1915	100	54	.649	2nd in AL behind Red Sox
3	1909	98	54	.645	Lost 1909 World Series to Pirates
4	1984	104	58	.642	Won 1984 World Series over Padres
5	1968	103	59	.636	Won 1968 World Series over Cardinals

=== The Players ===
==== Catcher: Oscar Stanage ====
Catcher Oscar Stanage was a weak hitter but one of the best defensive catchers of the deadball era. In thirteen seasons with the Tigers, Stanage caught 1,074 games – second only to Bill Freehan in team history. Known for his strong throwing arm, Stanage threw out more baserunners than any other catcher in the 1910s. Stanage still holds the American League record for most assists by a catcher, with 212 in 1911, and his career average of 1.29 assists per game is the fifth best in major league history. Stanage was not as skilled with the glove; his 41 errors in 1911 were the most by a catcher in the 20th Century.

==== Infield: Burns, Young, Bush and Vitt ====
First baseman "Tioga George" Burns played for the Tigers from 1914 to 1917. In 1915, Burns hit only .243 with 18 doubles. Burns went on to become a star after leaving the Tigers. In 1926, he was named the American League's MVP with a .358 batting average and an all-time MLB record 64 doubles.

Second baseman Ralph Young played for the Tigers from 1915 to 1921. In 1915, Young had a .243 batting average, but a much more respectable .339 on-base percentage. At 5'5", Young was one of the shortest players ever to play in a Tigers uniform. His small stature, and correspondingly small strike zone, assisted him in both collecting walks and avoiding strikeouts. In nine seasons, Young collected 495 bases on balls and struck out only 254 times (in 3,643 at bats). Young led all American League second basemen with 32 errors in 1915.

Shortstop Donie Bush was Detroit's starting shortstop for thirteen seasons from 1909 to 1921. In 1914, Bush had 425 putouts (still the major league record for shortstops) and 969 chances (still the American League record). He led the American League in assists by a shortstop in 1915 with 504. In 1915, he also collected 118 walks. During the decade from 1910 to 1919, no one had more bases on balls than Bush. Bush also ranked among the league leaders in stolen bases nine times, including in 1915 when he stole 35 bases. With his ability to get on base, and having Cobb and Crawford batting behind him, Bush was also among the league leaders in runs scored ten times, including his 1915 total of 99 runs.

Third baseman Ossie Vitt played seven seasons with the Tigers and was a poor hitter but a good fielder. In 1915, he hit .250 with 48 RBIs. He led all American League third basemen in 1915 and 1916 in putouts, assists and fielding percentage. His 208 assists in 1916 have not been exceeded by a Detroit third baseman since that time. While not a good hitter for average, Vitt was a good contact hitter and one of the best bunters of the era. He led the American League with 42 sacrifice hits in 1915, and his career total of 259 sacrifice hits (in a relatively short career) ranks 32nd best in major league history. Vitt was also one of the toughest players to strike out in MLB history. For his career, he struck out an average of once every 26.6 at bats, 35th best in MLB history.

==== Outfield: Veach, Cobb, and Crawford ====
The Tigers' 1915 outfield, with Bobby Veach in left, Ty Cobb in center, and Sam Crawford in right, has been ranked by baseball historian Bill James as the greatest outfield of all time. Though the league batting average in 1915 was .248, Cobb hit .369 with 99 RBIs and 144 runs scored, Crawford hit .313 and drove in 112 runs, and Veach hit .299 with 112 RBIs. The three Detroit outfielders ranked #1, #2, and #3 in total bases and RBIs.

Cobb also set a major league record with 96 stolen bases in 1915, a record which would not be broken for nearly 50 years until Maury Wills stole 104 bases in 1962.

==== Pitching: Coveleski, Dauss, Dubuc and Boland ====
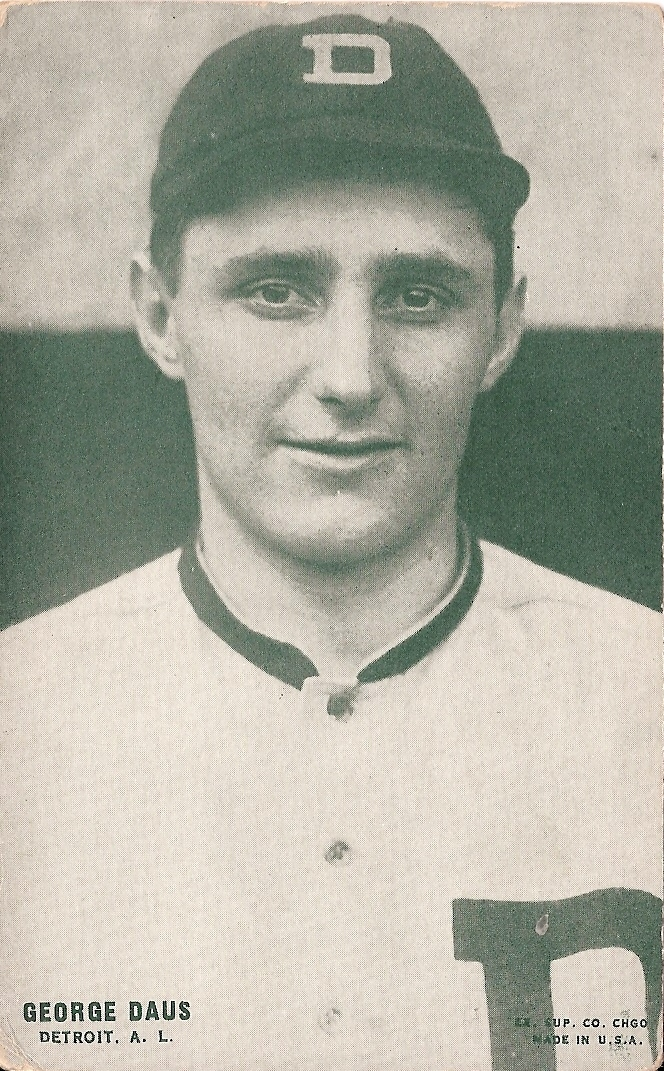
Hooks Dauss

Pitcher Hooks Dauss played his entire fifteen-year career with the Tigers and is the team's all-time win leader. In 1915, Dauss won 24 games (2nd most in the American League) and lost 13, ending up with a 2.50 ERA in 309 2/3 innings. Dauss was also an excellent fielding pitcher. His career range factor of 2.28 is 65 points higher than the average pitcher of his era. He had 1128 assists in his career, including an American League leading 137 in 1915. His career fielding percentage of .968 was also 20 points higher than the average pitcher of his era.

Pitcher Harry Coveleski joined the Tigers in 1914. He was a 20-game winner in his first three seasons in Detroit (1914–1916). In 1915, he had a record of 22–13 with an ERA of 2.45, and he followed in 1916 with a 1.97 ERA. In four of his five seasons with the Tigers, Coveleski's ERA was under three, and his 2.34 ERA with the Tigers is still the franchise's all-time career record.

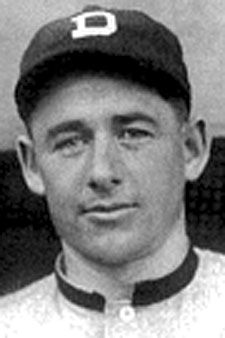
Bernie Boland

Pitcher Jean Dubuc was a pitching phenom at Notre Dame before entering professional baseball. In 1915, he went 17–12 for the Tigers with a 3.21 ERA. He is most remembered for his role in the 1918 Chicago Black Sox scandal. Pitcher Rube Benton testified that he had seen a telegram addressed to Dubuc, from Sleepy Bill Burns advising Dubuc: "Bet on the Cincinnati team today." After being linked to the scandal, Dubuc went to Canada and continued to play minor league ball. Dubuc is also credited with having signed Hank Greenberg while serving as a major league scout for the Tigers.

Bernie Boland was an early relief specialist who made his major league debut in 1915. Boland was 13–7 with a 3.11 ERA in his rookie season and came within one batter of throwing a perfect game. On August 16, 1915, Boland retired the first 26 Cleveland Indians batters he faced, only to give up a hit to Ben Paschal. Ironically, Paschal's hit off Boland was his only hit of the 1915 season. Boland and the Tigers went on to win the game 3–1. In 1926, Boland returned to the news for comments he made concerning a game-fixing scandal involving Ty Cobb. Boland, then a paving contractor in Detroit, was the Tigers pitcher in a 1919 game against Cleveland that Cobb had reportedly agreed to fix. Boland told the Detroit News in 1926 that he figured "about one in every 300 games is crooked," and he was glad that "some of them are getting justice at last".

=== Season standings ===
American League
Team	W	L	Pct.	GB	Home	Road
Boston Red Sox	101	50	.669	—	55‍–‍20	46‍–‍30
Detroit Tigers	100	54	.649	2½	51‍–‍26	49‍–‍28
Chicago White Sox	93	61	.604	9½	54‍–‍24	39‍–‍37
Washington Senators	85	68	.556	17	50‍–‍29	35‍–‍39
New York Yankees	69	83	.454	32½	37‍–‍43	32‍–‍40
St. Louis Browns	63	91	.409	39½	35‍–‍38	28‍–‍53
Cleveland Indians	57	95	.375	44½	27‍–‍50	30‍–‍45
Philadelphia Athletics	43	109	.283	58½	19‍–‍53	24‍–‍56

=== Record vs. opponents ===
1915 American League record Sources:
Team	BOS	CWS	CLE	DET	NYY	PHA	SLB	WSH
Boston	—	12–10	16–4	14–8	10–12	17–5–1	17–5–2	15–6–1
Chicago	10–12	—	16–6	7–15	15–7	19–3	18–4	8–14–1
Cleveland	4–16	6–16	—	5–17	9–13–1	15–7–1	12–10	6–16
Detroit	8–14	15–7	17–5	—	17–5	17–5	13–9–2	13–9
New York	12–10	7–15	13–9–1	5–17	—	11–9	12–10–1	9–13
Philadelphia	5–17–1	3–19	7–15–1	5–17	9–11	—	6–16	8–14
St. Louis	5–17–2	4–18	10–12	9–13–2	10–12–1	16–6	—	9–13
Washington	6–15–1	14–8–1	16–6	9–13	13–9	14–8	13–9	—

=== Roster ===
1915 Detroit Tigers
Roster
Pitchers: George Boehler; Bernie Boland; Pug Cavet; Harry Coveleski; Hooks Dauss; Jean Dubuc; Bill James; Razor Ledbetter; Grover Lowdermilk; Red Oldham; Ross Reynolds; Bill Steen	Catchers: Del Baker; Red McKee; John Peters; Oscar Stanage; Infielders: George Burns; Donie Bush; Frank Fuller; Baby Doll Jacobson; Marty Kavanagh; George Moriarty; Ossie Vitt; Ralph Young	Outfielders: Ty Cobb; Sam Crawford; Bobby Veach	Manager: Hughie Jennings; Coaches: Jimmy Burke; Deacon McGuire

=== Season highlights ===
- April 14: The Tigers lost their season opener at Navin Field to the Cleveland Indians, 5–1.
- April 28: The Tigers beat the St. Louis Browns, 12–3, as Ty Cobb stole home in the 3rd inning. Cobb stole home six times in 1915.
- April 30: The Tigers won their 12th game and were in first place with a record of 12–5. The Red Sox were in 5th place with a record of 5–6.
- May 14: The Tigers won their 18th game and were in first place with a record of 18–9. The Red Sox were in 4th place with a record of 11–9.
- June 4: The Tigers beat the Yankees, 3–0. Ty Cobb stole home in the 9th inning, the only steal of home that late in a game in his career. Yankee pitcher Ray Caldwell was so angry at the safe call he threw his mitt in the air and was ejected by umpire Silk O'Loughlin. It was Cobb's second steal of home while Caldwell was on the mound (the first was on May 12, 1911).
- June 9: The 2nd place Tigers defeated the 1st place Boston Red Sox, 15–0. With Ray Collins on the mound in the 3rd inning, Ty Cobb stole home.
- June 18: Ty Cobb stole home twice in a game against Washington, on the front end of double and triple steals. Both steals came with Joe Boehling on the mound. Washington's catcher, Bull Henry, left in the first inning with a spike wound from Cobb. The steals made the difference in the 5–3 Detroit win.
- June 23: For the fifth time in June, Ty Cobb stole home, doing it in a 4–2 Tiger win over the St. Louis Browns. Cobb scored another run when Sam Crawford hit the ball to pitcher Grover Lowdermilk, who somersaulted after fielding the grounder and sat on the mound holding the ball. Cobb scored from second base on the play.
- July 9: In Detroit, Babe Ruth lasted only a third of an inning and allowed four runs as the Tigers beat the Red Sox, 15–4.
- August 10: Detroit third baseman Ossie Vitt was hit by a Walter Johnson fastball and, after being knocked out for five minutes, left the game with a concussion. A rattled Johnson then allowed four runs in the first inning, two runs on a home run by the Tigers' first baseman, "Tioga George" Burns. Ty Cobb, observing Johnson's fear of hitting a batter, began to crowd the plate from that day forward and averaged .435 for the rest of his career against Johnson. Meanwhile, Babe Ruth won his 10th game by a score of 10–3 over the Browns.
- August 16: Detroit's rookie pitcher, Bernie Boland held Cleveland hitless through 26 batters. With two out in the 9th inning, Ben Paschal singled, his only hit in nine at bats during the 1915 season. Boland won, 3–1.
- August 18: The Tigers traded first baseman Baby Doll Jacobson to the Browns for pitchers Big Bill James and Grover Lowdermilk.
- August 19: The Tigers beat the A's, 6–1, while the White Sox beat the Red Sox, 2–1. Boston and Detroit were tied for 1st.
- August 21: Having played 112 games, the Tigers (73–39) had won nine straight games and were tied for 1st place with the Red Sox (71–37).
- August 22: In the second inning of the first game a doubleheader, the Senators scored a run on the Tigers with no times at bat—the only time that has ever happened. Chick Gandil and Merito Acosta walked; Buff Williams sacrificed, and George McBride hit a sacrifice fly, scoring Gandil. The Tigers then caught Acosta off second base when Bobby Veach threw to Ossie Vitt. Walter Johnson was the winning pitcher as the Senators beat the Tigers, 8–1, and broke the Tigers' 9-game win streak. With the Tigers loss, the Red Sox move into sole possession of first place, where they remained for the rest of the season.
- August 25: The Red Sox beat the Tigers, 2–1, in 13 innings to solidify their hold on 1st place. Boston had won seven straight and 19 of 21.
- August 27: Detroit snapped the Red Sox win streak, beating Boston, 7–6 in 12 innings. Boston still led the American League by 4 1/2 games.

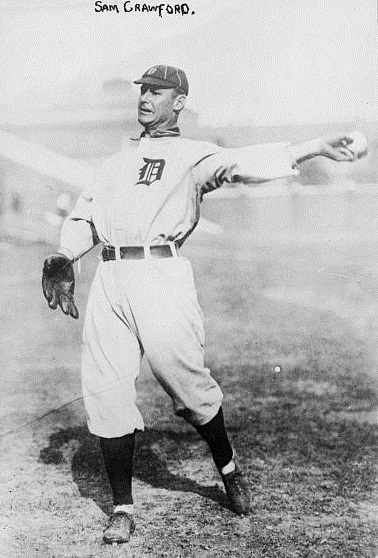
Sam Crawford

- September 5: In the first game of a doubleheader, the Tigers defeated the Browns, 6–5. The Browns' starting pitcher was rookie (and former University of Michigan star) George Sisler, who pitched a complete game and hit a home run in the loss.
- September 16: In the first of four games series at Fenway Park, the Tigers (90–48) and Red Sox (90–44) squared off. Detroit knocked out starter Rube Foster, then rookie reliever Carl Mays kept throwing at Ty Cobb until he hit him on the wrist. Cobb threw his bat at Mays in retaliation, and the crowd reacted by throwing bottles at Cobb. The next inning, Cobb caught a fly ball for the final out and needed a police escort to leave the field. The Tigers won 6–1 to move within one game of the first place Red Sox.
- September 17: Dutch Leonard allowed three hits as the Red Sox beat Detroit, 7–2.
- September 18: The Tigers and Red Sox met in a pitching duel, as the game went into extra innings with the score tied 0–0. The Red Sox won, 1–0, in the 12th inning.
- September 20: In front of a full house at Fenway Park, including Vice-President Thomas R. Marshall, Babe Ruth led Boston to a 3–2 win over Detroit. Rube Foster relieved Ruth with two outs in the 8th inning. Ruth was 1-for-3 at bat. Having lost three straight to the Red Sox, the Tigers were four games out of first place.
- September 23: In Philadelphia, Ty Cobb stole his 90th base of the year. Only 300 fans were on hand. The Tigers won, 6–5.
- September 25: The Tigers swept both games of a double header against the Senators, 5–1 in the opener, and 9–3 in the second game. The Tigers were still in contention as they headed into the final week of the season.
- September 29: The Tigers beat the Browns, 3–2, at Navin Field.
- September 30: The Red Sox clinched the American League pennant as the St. Louis Browns beat Detroit, giving Boston a two 1/2-game margin.
- October 3: The Tigers won their 100th game of the year, and Ty Cobb stole his 96th base against Cleveland's catcher Steve O'Neill. Cobb's total of 96 steals was a major league record that stood until 1962 when Maury Wills stole 104 bases. The 1915 season was the first time a team had won 100 games without winning the pennant.

== Player stats ==
=== Batting ===
==== Starters by position ====
Note: Pos = Position; G = Games played; AB = At bats; H = Hits; Avg. = Batting average; HR = Home runs; RBI = Runs batted in

Pos	Player	G	AB	H	Avg.	HR	RBI
C	Oscar Stanage	100	300	67	.223	1	31
1B	George Burns	105	392	99	.253	5	50
2B	Ralph Young	123	378	92	.243	0	31
3B	Ossie Vitt	152	560	140	.250	1	48
SS	Donie Bush	155	561	128	.228	1	44
OF	Sam Crawford	156	612	183	.299	4	112
OF	Ty Cobb	156	563	208	.369	3	99
OF	Bobby Veach	152	569	178	.313	3	112

==== Other batters ====
Note: G = Games played; AB = At bats; H = Hits; Avg. = Batting average; HR = Home runs; RBI = Runs batted in

Player	G	AB	H	Avg.	HR	RBI
Marty Kavanagh	113	332	98	.295	4	49
Del Baker	68	134	33	.246	0	15
Red McKee	55	106	29	.274	1	17
Baby Doll Jacobson	37	65	14	.215	0	4
George Moriarty	31	38	8	.211	0	0
Frank Fuller	14	32	5	.156	0	2
John Peters	1	3	0	.000	0	0

Note: pitchers' batting statistics not included

=== Pitching ===
==== Starting pitchers ====
Note: G = Games pitched; IP = Innings pitched; W = Wins; L = Losses; ERA = Earned run average; SO = Strikeouts

Player	G	IP	W	L	ERA	SO
Harry Coveleski	50	312.2	22	13	2.45	150
Hooks Dauss	46	309.2	24	13	2.50	132
Jean Dubuc	39	258.0	17	12	3.21	74
Bill James	11	67.0	7	3	2.42	24

==== Other pitchers ====
Note: G = Games pitched; IP = Innings pitched; W = Wins; L = Losses; ERA = Earned run average; SO = Strikeouts

Player	G	IP	W	L	ERA	SO
Bernie Boland	45	202.2	13	7	3.11	72
Bill Steen	20	79.1	5	1	2.72	28
Pug Cavet	17	71.0	4	2	4.06	26
Grover Lowdermilk	7	28.0	4	1	4.18	18
Ross Reynolds	4	11.1	0	1	6.35	2

==== Relief pitchers ====
Note: G = Games pitched; W = Wins; L = Losses; SV = Saves; ERA = Earned run average; SO = Strikeouts

Player	G	W	L	SV	ERA	SO
Red Oldham	17	3	0	4	2.81	17
George Boehler	8	1	1	0	1.80	7
Razor Ledbetter	1	0	0	0	0.00	0

== Awards and honors ==
=== League leaders ===
- Donie Bush – American League plate appearances leader (703)
- Donie Bush – American League leader in assists at shortstop (504)
- Ty Cobb – American League batting champion (.369)
- Ty Cobb – American League on-base percentage leader (.486)
- Ty Cobb – American League stolen bases leader (96)
- Ty Cobb – American League total bases leader (274)
- Ty Cobb – American League hits leader (208)
- Ty Cobb – American League runs leader (144)
- Harry Coveleski – American League leader in games (50)
- Harry Coveleski – American League leader in hit batsmen (20)
- Harry Coveleski – American League leader in hits allowed (271)
- Harry Coveleski – American League leader in errors at pitcher (11)
- Sam Crawford – American League leader in RBIs (112)
- Sam Crawford – American League extra base hits leader (54)
- Sam Crawford – American League triples leader (19)
- Hooks Dauss – American League leader in assists at pitcher (137)
- Bobby Veach – American League leader in RBIs (112)
- Bobby Veach – American League doubles leader (40)
- Ossie Vitt – American League sacrifice hits leader (42)
- Ossie Vitt – American League leader in putouts at third base (191)
- Ossie Vitt – American League leader in assists at third base (324)
- Ossie Vitt – American League leader in fielding percentage at third base (.964)
- Ralph Young – American League leader in errors at second base (32)

=== Players Ranking Among Top 100 of All Time At Position ===
The following members of the 1915 Detroit Tigers are among the Top 100 players of all time at their position, as ranked in The New Bill James Historical Baseball Abstract in 2001:

- George Burns: 79th best first baseman of all time
- Donie Bush: 51st best shortstop of all time
- Bobby Veach: 33rd best left fielder of all time
- Ty Cobb: 2nd best center fielder of all time
- Sam Crawford: 10th best right fielder of all time
