= 1919 Chicago White Sox season =

1919 Chicago White Sox
- American League champions
- League: American League
- Ballpark: Comiskey Park
- City: Chicago, Illinois
- Record: 88–52 (.629)
- League place: 1st
- Owners: Charles Comiskey
- Managers: Kid Gleason

The 1919 Chicago White Sox season was their 19th season in the American League. They won 88 games to advance to the World Series but lost to the Cincinnati Reds. More significantly, some of the players were found to have taken money from gamblers in return for throwing the series. The "Black Sox Scandal" had permanent ramifications for baseball, including the establishment of the office of Commissioner of Baseball.

== Regular season ==
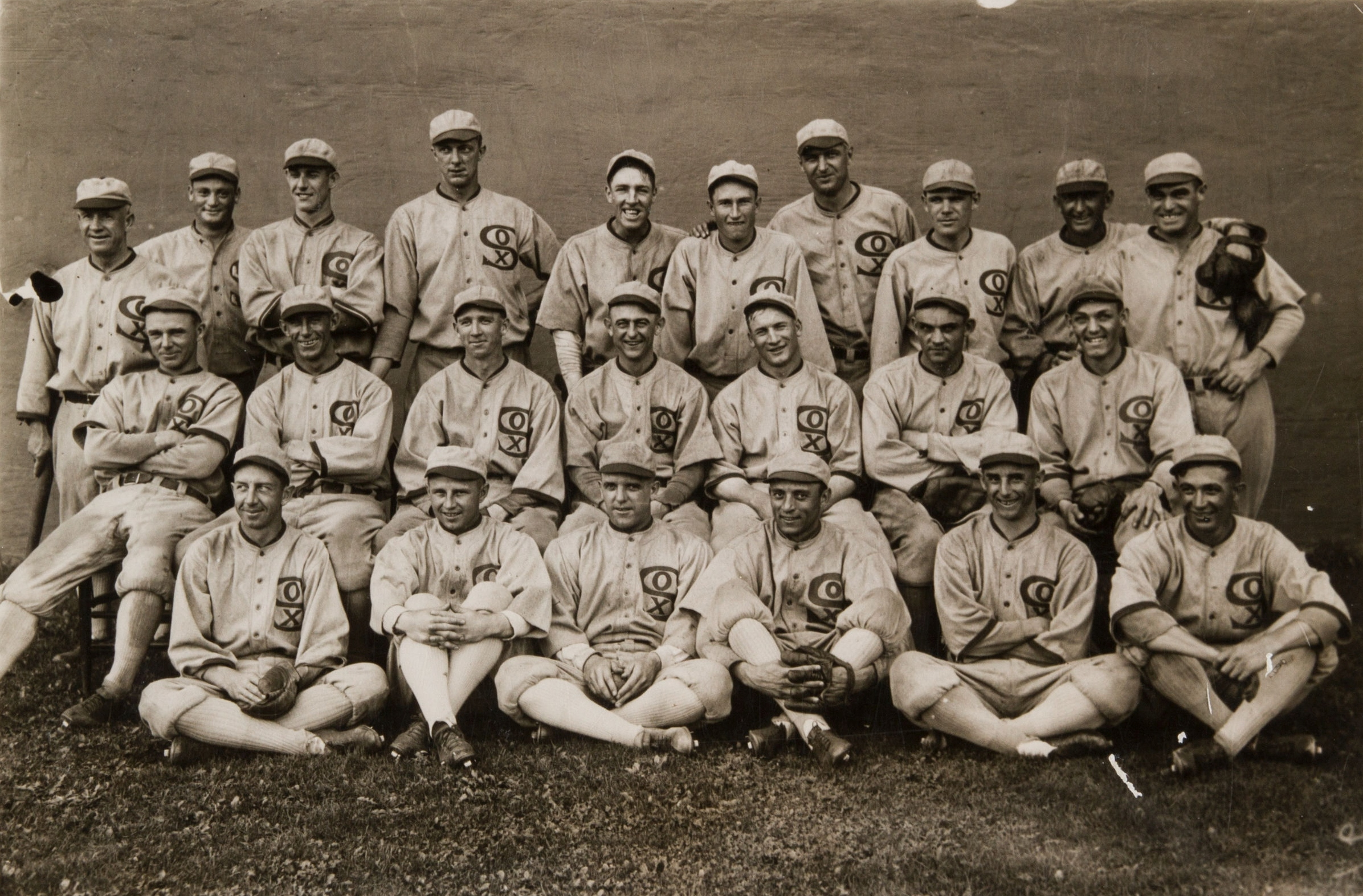
1919 Chicago White Sox team photo

In 1919, Eddie Cicotte led the majors with 29 wins and 30 complete games, going 29–7 for the season with a 1.82 ERA (2nd in AL) and 110 strikeouts (7th in AL). He also led the AL in innings pitched with 240 (shared with Washington Senators pitcher Jim Shaw).

Right fielder Joe Jackson hit .351 (4th in AL) with 7 home runs, 96 RBIs (3rd in AL) and had 181 hits (3rd in AL, only 10 fewer than league leader Ty Cobb of the Detroit Tigers). Shoeless Joe headed an offense that scored the most runs of any team.

=== Season standings ===
American League
| Team | W | L | Pct. | GB | Home | Road |
|---|---|---|---|---|---|---|
| Chicago White Sox | 88 | 52 | .629 | — | 48‍–‍22 | 40‍–‍30 |
| Cleveland Indians | 84 | 55 | .604 | 3½ | 44‍–‍25 | 40‍–‍30 |
| New York Yankees | 80 | 59 | .576 | 7½ | 46‍–‍25 | 34‍–‍34 |
| Detroit Tigers | 80 | 60 | .571 | 8 | 46‍–‍24 | 34‍–‍36 |
| St. Louis Browns | 67 | 72 | .482 | 20½ | 40‍–‍30 | 27‍–‍42 |
| Boston Red Sox | 66 | 71 | .482 | 20½ | 35‍–‍30 | 31‍–‍41 |
| Washington Senators | 56 | 84 | .400 | 32 | 32‍–‍40 | 24‍–‍44 |
| Philadelphia Athletics | 36 | 104 | .257 | 52 | 21‍–‍49 | 15‍–‍55 |

=== Record vs. opponents ===
1919 American League record Sources:
| Team | BOS | CWS | CLE | DET | NYY | PHA | SLB | WSH |
|---|---|---|---|---|---|---|---|---|
| Boston | — | 9–11 | 4–15 | 9–11 | 10–9 | 14–6 | 9–10–1 | 11–9 |
| Chicago | 11–9 | — | 12–8 | 11–9 | 12–8 | 17–3 | 11–9 | 14–6 |
| Cleveland | 15–4 | 8–12 | — | 8–12 | 13–7 | 16–4 | 11–9 | 13–7 |
| Detroit | 11–9 | 9–11 | 12–8 | — | 8–12 | 14–6 | 14–6 | 12–8 |
| New York | 9–10 | 8–12 | 7–13 | 12–8 | — | 18–2 | 12–8 | 14–6–2 |
| Philadelphia | 6–14 | 3–17 | 4–16 | 6–14 | 2–18 | — | 7–13 | 8–12 |
| St. Louis | 10–9–1 | 9–11 | 9–11 | 6–14 | 8–12 | 13–7 | — | 12–8 |
| Washington | 9–11 | 6–14 | 7–13 | 8–12 | 6–14–2 | 12–8 | 8–12 | — |

=== Roster ===
1919 Chicago White Sox
Roster
| Pitchers: Joe Benz; Eddie Cicotte; Dave Danforth; Red Faber; Bill James; Dickey Kerr; Grover Lowdermilk; Erskine Mayer; Tom McGuire; Win Noyes; Pat Ragan; Charlie Robertson; Reb Russell; Frank Shellenback; John Sullivan; Roy Wilkinson; Lefty Williams | Catchers: Joe Jenkins; Byrd Lynn; Ray Schalk; Infielders: Eddie Collins; Chick Gandil; Hervey McClellan; Fred McMullin; Swede Risberg; Buck Weaver | Outfielders: Shano Collins; Happy Felsch; Joe Jackson; Nemo Leibold; Eddie Murphy | Manager: Kid Gleason |

== Player stats ==
=== Batting ===
==== Starters by position ====
Note: Pos = Position; G = Games played; AB = At bats; H = Hits; Avg. = Batting average; HR = Home runs; RBI = Runs batted in

| Pos | Player | G | AB | H | Avg. | HR | RBI |
|---|---|---|---|---|---|---|---|
| C | Ray Schalk | 131 | 394 | 111 | .282 | 0 | 34 |
| 1B | Chick Gandil | 115 | 441 | 128 | .290 | 1 | 60 |
| 2B | Eddie Collins | 140 | 518 | 165 | .319 | 4 | 80 |
| 3B | Buck Weaver | 140 | 571 | 169 | .296 | 3 | 75 |
| SS | Swede Risberg | 119 | 414 | 106 | .256 | 2 | 38 |
| LF | Joe Jackson | 139 | 516 | 181 | .351 | 7 | 96 |
| CF | Happy Felsch | 135 | 502 | 138 | .275 | 7 | 86 |
| RF | Nemo Leibold | 122 | 434 | 131 | .302 | 0 | 26 |

==== Other batters ====
Note: G = Games played; AB = At bats; H = Hits; Avg. = Batting average; HR = Home runs; RBI = Runs batted in

| Player | G | AB | H | Avg. | HR | RBI |
|---|---|---|---|---|---|---|
| Shano Collins | 63 | 179 | 50 | .279 | 0 | 4 |
| Fred McMullin | 60 | 170 | 50 | .294 | 0 | 19 |
| Byrd Lynn | 29 | 66 | 15 | .227 | 0 | 4 |
| Eddie Murphy | 30 | 35 | 17 | .486 | 0 | 5 |
| Joe Jenkins | 11 | 19 | 3 | .158 | 0 | 1 |
| Hervey McClellan | 7 | 12 | 4 | .333 | 0 | 1 |

=== Pitching ===
==== Starting pitchers ====
Note: G = Games pitched; IP = Innings pitched; W = Wins; L = Losses; ERA = Earned run average; SO = Strikeouts

| Player | G | IP | W | L | ERA | SO |
|---|---|---|---|---|---|---|
| Eddie Cicotte | 40 | 306.2 | 29 | 7 | 1.82 | 110 |
| Lefty Williams | 41 | 297.0 | 23 | 11 | 2.64 | 125 |
| Dickey Kerr | 39 | 212.1 | 13 | 7 | 2.88 | 79 |
| Red Faber | 25 | 162.1 | 11 | 9 | 3.83 | 45 |
| Win Noyes | 1 | 6.0 | 0 | 0 | 7.50 | 4 |
| Charlie Robertson | 1 | 2.0 | 0 | 1 | 9.00 | 1 |

==== Other pitchers ====
Note: G = Games pitched; IP = Innings pitched; W = Wins; L = Losses; ERA = Earned run average; SO = Strikeouts

| Player | G | IP | W | L | ERA | SO |
|---|---|---|---|---|---|---|
| Grover Lowdermilk | 20 | 96.2 | 5 | 5 | 2.79 | 43 |
| Bill James | 5 | 39.1 | 3 | 2 | 2.52 | 11 |
| Frank Shellenback | 8 | 35.0 | 1 | 3 | 5.14 | 10 |
| Erskine Mayer | 6 | 23.2 | 1 | 3 | 8.37 | 9 |
| Roy Wilkinson | 4 | 22.0 | 1 | 1 | 2.05 | 5 |
| John Sullivan | 4 | 15.0 | 0 | 1 | 4.20 | 9 |

==== Relief pitchers ====
Note: G = Games pitched; W = Wins; L = Losses; SV = Saves; ERA = Earned run average; SO = Strikeouts

| Player | G | W | L | SV | ERA | SO |
|---|---|---|---|---|---|---|
| Dave Danforth | 15 | 1 | 2 | 1 | 7.78 | 17 |
| Joe Benz | 1 | 0 | 0 | 0 | 0.00 | 0 |
| Tom McGuire | 1 | 0 | 0 | 0 | 9.00 | 0 |
| Pat Ragan | 1 | 0 | 0 | 0 | 0.00 | 0 |
| Reb Russell | 1 | 0 | 0 | 0 | 0.00 | 0 |

== Awards and honors ==
=== League top ten finishers ===
Eddie Cicotte

- MLB leader in wins (29)
- MLB leader in complete games (30)
- Equal AL leader in innings pitched (240)
- #2 in AL in ERA (1.82)
- #2 in AL in shutouts (5)
- #7 in AL in strikeouts (110)

Happy Felsch

- #6 in AL in RBI (86)

Joe Jackson

- #3 in AL in RBI (96)
- #3 in AL in hits (181)
- #4 in AL in batting average (.351)
- #4 in AL in on-base percentage (.422)
- #4 in AL in triples (14)
- #5 in AL in slugging percentage (.506)

Buck Weaver

- #4 in AL in runs scored (89)
- #7 in AL in stolen bases (22)
- #7 in AL in hits (169)

Lefty Williams

- #2 in AL in shutouts (5)
- #2 in AL in complete games (27)
- #3 in AL in wins (23)
- #3 in AL in strikeouts (125)
- #9 in AL in ERA (2.64)

== 1919 World Series ==
NL Cincinnati Reds (5) vs. AL Chicago White Sox (3)

| Game | Score | Date | Location | Attendance |
|---|---|---|---|---|
| 1 | Chicago White Sox – 1, Cincinnati Reds – 9 | October 1 | Redland Field | 30,511 |
| 2 | Chicago White Sox – 2, Cincinnati Reds – 4 | October 2 | Redland Field | 29,690 |
| 3 | Cincinnati Reds – 0, Chicago White Sox – 3 | October 3 | Comiskey Park | 29,126 |
| 4 | Cincinnati Reds – 2, Chicago White Sox – 0 | October 4 | Comiskey Park | 34,363 |
| 5 | Cincinnati Reds – 5, Chicago White Sox – 0 | October 6 | Comiskey Park | 34,379 |
| 6 | Chicago White Sox – 5, Cincinnati Reds – 4 (10 innings) | October 7 | Redland Field | 32,006 |
| 7 | Chicago White Sox – 4, Cincinnati Reds – 1 | October 8 | Redland Field | 13,923 |
| 8 | Cincinnati Reds – 10, Chicago White Sox – 5 | October 9 | Comiskey Park | 32,930 |

=== Black Sox Scandal ===
The Black Sox Scandal refers to a number of events that took place around and during the play of the 1919 World Series. The name "Black Sox" also refers to the Chicago White Sox team from that era. Eight members of the Chicago franchise were banned from baseball for throwing (intentionally losing) games.

==== The Fix ====
The conspiracy was the brainchild of White Sox first baseman Arnold "Chick" Gandil and Joseph "Sport" Sullivan, who was a professional gambler of Gandil's acquaintance. New York gangster Arnold Rothstein supplied the major connections needed. The money was supplied by Abe Attell, former featherweight boxing champion, who accepted the offer even though he didn't have the $80,000 that the White Sox wanted.

Gandil enlisted seven of his teammates, motivated by a mixture of greed and a dislike of penurious club owner Charles Comiskey, to implement the fix. Starting pitchers Eddie Cicotte and Claude "Lefty" Williams, outfielders "Shoeless" Joe Jackson and Oscar "Happy" Felsch, and infielder Charles "Swede" Risberg were all involved. Buck Weaver was also asked to participate, but refused; he was later banned with the others for knowing of the fix but not reporting it. Utility infielder Fred McMullin was not initially approached but got word of the fix and threatened to report the others unless he was in on the payoff. Sullivan and his two associates, Sleepy Bill Burns and Billy Maharg, somewhat out of their depth, approached Rothstein to provide the money for the players, who were promised a total of $100,000.

Stories of the "Black Sox" scandal have usually included Comiskey in its gallery of subsidiary villains, focusing in particular on his intentions regarding a clause in Cicotte's contract that would have paid Cicotte an additional $10,000 bonus for winning 30 games. According to Eliot Asinof's account of the events, Eight Men Out, Cicotte was "rested" for the season's final two weeks after reaching his 29th win, presumably to deny him the bonus. In reality, however, Cicotte started the White Sox's last game of the season, September 28th against the Tigers. But, with a 1-0 Chicago lead, Chicago manager Kid Gleason took Cicotte out of the game following the second inning, which assured Cicotte could not get his 30th win.
