= 1919 St. Louis Browns season =

Major League Baseball season

1919 St. Louis Browns
- League: American League
- Ballpark: Sportsman's Park
- City: St. Louis, Missouri
- Record: 67–72 (.482)
- League place: 5th
- Owners: Phil Ball
- Managers: Jimmy Burke

The 1919 St. Louis Browns season involved the Browns finishing 5th in the American League with a record of 67 wins and 72 losses.

== Regular season ==
=== Season standings ===
American League
Team	W	L	Pct.	GB	Home	Road
Chicago White Sox	88	52	.629	—	48‍–‍22	40‍–‍30
Cleveland Indians	84	55	.604	3½	44‍–‍25	40‍–‍30
New York Yankees	80	59	.576	7½	46‍–‍25	34‍–‍34
Detroit Tigers	80	60	.571	8	46‍–‍24	34‍–‍36
St. Louis Browns	67	72	.482	20½	40‍–‍30	27‍–‍42
Boston Red Sox	66	71	.482	20½	35‍–‍30	31‍–‍41
Washington Senators	56	84	.400	32	32‍–‍40	24‍–‍44
Philadelphia Athletics	36	104	.257	52	21‍–‍49	15‍–‍55

=== Record vs. opponents ===
1919 American League record Sources:
Team	BOS	CWS	CLE	DET	NYY	PHA	SLB	WSH
Boston	—	9–11	4–15	9–11	10–9	14–6	9–10–1	11–9
Chicago	11–9	—	12–8	11–9	12–8	17–3	11–9	14–6
Cleveland	15–4	8–12	—	8–12	13–7	16–4	11–9	13–7
Detroit	11–9	9–11	12–8	—	8–12	14–6	14–6	12–8
New York	9–10	8–12	7–13	12–8	—	18–2	12–8	14–6–2
Philadelphia	6–14	3–17	4–16	6–14	2–18	—	7–13	8–12
St. Louis	10–9–1	9–11	9–11	6–14	8–12	13–7	—	12–8
Washington	9–11	6–14	7–13	8–12	6–14–2	12–8	8–12	—

=== Roster ===
1919 St. Louis Browns
Roster
Pitchers: Bill Bayne; Dave Davenport; Bert Gallia; Hal Haid; Ernie Koob; Lefty Leifield; Grover Lowdermilk; Rolla Mapel; Tom Rogers; Urban Shocker; Allen Sothoron; Elam Vangilder; Carl Weilman; Rasty Wright	Catchers: Josh Billings; Pat Collins; Wally Mayer; Hank Severeid; Infielders: Jimmy Austin; Herman Bronkie; Joe Gedeon; Wally Gerber; Gene Robertson; Joe Schepner; John Shovlin; George Sisler	Outfielders: Ray Demmitt; Baby Doll Jacobson; Tod Sloan; Earl Smith; Jack Tobin; Ken Williams	Manager: Jimmy Burke

== Player stats ==
=== Batting ===
==== Starters by position ====
Note: Pos = Position; G = Games played; AB = At bats; H = Hits; Avg. = Batting average; HR = Home runs; RBI = Runs batted in

Pos	Player	G	AB	H	Avg.	HR	RBI
C	Hank Severeid	112	351	87	.248	0	36
1B	George Sisler	132	511	180	.352	10	83
2B	Joe Gedeon	120	437	111	.254	0	27
SS	Wally Gerber	140	462	105	.227	1	37
3B	Jimmy Austin	106	396	94	.237	1	21
OF	Earl Smith	88	252	63	.250	1	36
OF	Jack Tobin	127	486	159	.327	6	57
OF	Baby Doll Jacobson	120	455	147	.323	4	51

==== Other batters ====
Note: G = Games played; AB = At bats; H = Hits; Avg. = Batting average; HR = Home runs; RBI = Runs batted in

Player	G	AB	H	Avg.	HR	RBI
Ken Williams	65	227	68	.300	6	35
Ray Demmitt	79	202	48	.238	1	19
Herman Bronkie	67	196	50	.255	0	14
Josh Billings	38	76	15	.197	0	3
Tod Sloan	27	63	15	.238	0	6
Wally Mayer	30	62	14	.226	0	5
Joe Schepner	14	48	10	.208	0	6
John Shovlin	9	35	7	.200	0	1
Pat Collins	11	21	3	.143	0	1
Gene Robertson	5	7	1	.143	0	0

=== Pitching ===
==== Starting pitchers ====
Note: G = Games pitched; IP = Innings pitched; W = Wins; L = Losses; ERA = Earned run average; SO = Strikeouts

Player	G	IP	W	L	ERA	SO
Allan Sothoron	40	270.0	20	12	2.20	106
Bert Gallia	34	222.1	12	14	3.60	83
Urban Shocker	30	211.0	13	11	2.69	86
Carl Weilman	20	148.0	10	6	2.07	44
Dave Davenport	24	123.1	2	11	3.94	37
Rolla Mapel	4	20.0	0	3	4.50	2
Bill Bayne	2	12.0	1	1	5.25	0

==== Other pitchers ====
Note: G = Games pitched; IP = Innings pitched; W = Wins; L = Losses; ERA = Earned run average; SO = Strikeouts

Player	G	IP	W	L	ERA	SO
Lefty Leifield	19	92.0	6	4	2.93	18
Ernie Koob	25	66.0	2	4	4.64	11
Rasty Wright	24	63.1	0	5	5.54	14
Elam Vangilder	3	13.0	1	0	2.08	6

==== Relief pitchers ====
Note: G = Games pitched; W = Wins; L = Losses; SV = Saves; ERA = Earned run average; SO = Strikeouts

Player	G	W	L	SV	ERA	SO
Grover Lowdermilk	7	0	0	0	0.75	6
Tom Rogers	2	0	1	0	27.00	1
Hal Haid	1	0	0	0	18.00	1
