= 1919 Philadelphia Athletics season =

1919 Philadelphia Athletics
- League: American League
- Ballpark: Shibe Park
- City: Philadelphia
- Record: 36–104 (.257)
- League place: 8th
- Owners: Connie Mack, Benjamin Shibe, Tom Shibe and John Shibe
- Managers: Connie Mack

The 1919 Philadelphia Athletics season involved the A's finishing last in the American League with a record of 36 wins and 104 losses. It was their fifth consecutive season in the cellar after owner-manager Connie Mack sold off his star players.

Philadelphia led the AL in fewest runs scored and most runs allowed, and they did so by wide margins. Their team ERA was 4.26, nearly a full run higher than the second worst team in the league that year. The A's team batting average of .244 was the lowest in both leagues. The pitching staff pitched only one shutout in the entire season.

In July 1919, a newspaper reported, "Veteran Harry Davis has been coaxed out of his retirement and has been made assistant manager of the Athletics." Although Connie Mack was the team's manager, the report said, "Mack hereafter will devote most of his time to business affairs of the club" and that the understanding was that Davis "really is in full charge of the team."

== Regular season ==
=== Season standings ===
American League
| Team | W | L | Pct. | GB | Home | Road |
|---|---|---|---|---|---|---|
| Chicago White Sox | 88 | 52 | .629 | — | 48‍–‍22 | 40‍–‍30 |
| Cleveland Indians | 84 | 55 | .604 | 3½ | 44‍–‍25 | 40‍–‍30 |
| New York Yankees | 80 | 59 | .576 | 7½ | 46‍–‍25 | 34‍–‍34 |
| Detroit Tigers | 80 | 60 | .571 | 8 | 46‍–‍24 | 34‍–‍36 |
| St. Louis Browns | 67 | 72 | .482 | 20½ | 40‍–‍30 | 27‍–‍42 |
| Boston Red Sox | 66 | 71 | .482 | 20½ | 35‍–‍30 | 31‍–‍41 |
| Washington Senators | 56 | 84 | .400 | 32 | 32‍–‍40 | 24‍–‍44 |
| Philadelphia Athletics | 36 | 104 | .257 | 52 | 21‍–‍49 | 15‍–‍55 |

=== Record vs. opponents ===
1919 American League record Sources:
| Team | BOS | CWS | CLE | DET | NYY | PHA | SLB | WSH |
|---|---|---|---|---|---|---|---|---|
| Boston | — | 9–11 | 4–15 | 9–11 | 10–9 | 14–6 | 9–10–1 | 11–9 |
| Chicago | 11–9 | — | 12–8 | 11–9 | 12–8 | 17–3 | 11–9 | 14–6 |
| Cleveland | 15–4 | 8–12 | — | 8–12 | 13–7 | 16–4 | 11–9 | 13–7 |
| Detroit | 11–9 | 9–11 | 12–8 | — | 8–12 | 14–6 | 14–6 | 12–8 |
| New York | 9–10 | 8–12 | 7–13 | 12–8 | — | 18–2 | 12–8 | 14–6–2 |
| Philadelphia | 6–14 | 3–17 | 4–16 | 6–14 | 2–18 | — | 7–13 | 8–12 |
| St. Louis | 10–9–1 | 9–11 | 9–11 | 6–14 | 8–12 | 13–7 | — | 12–8 |
| Washington | 9–11 | 6–14 | 7–13 | 8–12 | 6–14–2 | 12–8 | 8–12 | — |

=== Notable transactions ===
- June 13, 1919: Roy Grover was traded by the Athletics to the Washington Senators for Harry Thompson.

=== Roster ===
1919 Philadelphia Athletics
Roster
| Pitchers: Willie Adams; Walter Anderson; Dan Boone; Charlie Eckert; Bob Geary; Bill Grevell; Bob Hasty; Jing Johnson; Dave Keefe; Walt Kinney; Mike Kircher; Pat Martin; Rollie Naylor; Win Noyes; Scott Perry; William Pierson; Ray Roberts; Tom Rogers; Socks Seibold; Harry Thompson; Mule Watson; Lefty York; Jimmy Zinn | Catchers: Wickey McAvoy; Cy Perkins; Lena Styles; Johnny Walker; Infielders: George Burns; Dick Burrus; Snooks Dowd; Joe Dugan; Jimmy Dykes; Art Ewoldt; Chick Galloway; Ivy Griffin; Lew Groh; Roy Grover; Red Shannon; Fred Thomas; Terry Turner | Outfielders: Bob Allen; Charlie High; Merlin Kopp; Braggo Roth; Amos Strunk; Tilly Walker; Frank Welch; Al Wingo; Whitey Witt | Manager: Connie Mack |

== Player stats ==
=== Batting ===
==== Starters by position ====
Note: Pos = Position; G = Games played; AB = At bats; H = Hits; Avg. = Batting average; HR = Home runs; RBI = Runs batted in

| Pos | Player | G | AB | H | Avg. | HR | RBI |
|---|---|---|---|---|---|---|---|
| C | Cy Perkins | 101 | 305 | 77 | .252 | 2 | 29 |
| 1B | George Burns | 126 | 470 | 139 | .296 | 8 | 57 |
| 2B | Red Shannon | 39 | 155 | 42 | .271 | 0 | 14 |
| 3B | Fred Thomas | 124 | 453 | 96 | .212 | 2 | 23 |
| SS | Joe Dugan | 104 | 387 | 105 | .271 | 1 | 30 |
| OF | Tilly Walker | 125 | 456 | 133 | .292 | 10 | 64 |
| OF | Merlin Kopp | 75 | 235 | 53 | .226 | 1 | 12 |
| OF | Whitey Witt | 122 | 460 | 123 | .267 | 0 | 33 |

==== Other batters ====
Note: G = Games played; AB = At bats; H = Hits; Avg. = Batting average; HR = Home runs; RBI = Runs batted in

| Player | G | AB | H | Avg. | HR | RBI |
|---|---|---|---|---|---|---|
| Braggo Roth | 48 | 195 | 63 | .323 | 5 | 29 |
| Amos Strunk | 60 | 194 | 41 | .211 | 0 | 13 |
| Dick Burrus | 70 | 194 | 50 | .258 | 0 | 8 |
| Wickey McAvoy | 62 | 170 | 24 | .141 | 0 | 11 |
| Terry Turner | 38 | 127 | 24 | .189 | 0 | 6 |
| Ivy Griffin | 17 | 68 | 20 | .294 | 0 | 6 |
| Chick Galloway | 17 | 63 | 9 | .143 | 0 | 4 |
| Al Wingo | 15 | 59 | 18 | .305 | 0 | 2 |
| Roy Grover | 22 | 56 | 13 | .232 | 0 | 2 |
| Frank Welch | 15 | 54 | 9 | .167 | 2 | 7 |
| Jimmy Dykes | 17 | 49 | 9 | .184 | 0 | 1 |
| Art Ewoldt | 9 | 32 | 7 | .219 | 0 | 2 |
| Charlie High | 11 | 29 | 2 | .069 | 0 | 1 |
| Bob Allen | 9 | 22 | 3 | .136 | 0 | 0 |
| Lena Styles | 8 | 22 | 6 | .273 | 0 | 5 |
| Snooks Dowd | 13 | 18 | 3 | .167 | 0 | 6 |
| Johnny Walker | 3 | 9 | 0 | .000 | 0 | 0 |
| Lew Groh | 2 | 4 | 0 | .000 | 0 | 0 |

=== Pitching ===
==== Starting pitchers ====
Note: G = Games pitched; IP = Innings pitched; W = Wins; L = Losses; ERA = Earned run average; SO = Strikeouts

| Player | G | IP | W | L | ERA | SO |
|---|---|---|---|---|---|---|
| Rollie Naylor | 31 | 204.2 | 5 | 18 | 3.34 | 68 |
| Jing Johnson | 34 | 202.0 | 9 | 15 | 3.61 | 67 |
| Scott Perry | 25 | 183.2 | 4 | 17 | 3.58 | 38 |
| Tom Rogers | 23 | 140.0 | 4 | 12 | 4.31 | 37 |
| Bob Hasty | 2 | 12.0 | 0 | 2 | 5.25 | 5 |
| Pat Martin | 2 | 11.0 | 0 | 2 | 4.09 | 6 |
| Dave Keefe | 1 | 9.0 | 0 | 1 | 4.00 | 5 |
| Lefty York | 2 | 4.1 | 0 | 2 | 24.92 | 2 |

==== Other pitchers ====
Note: G = Games pitched; IP = Innings pitched; W = Wins; L = Losses; ERA = Earned run average; SO = Strikeouts

| Player | G | IP | W | L | ERA | SO |
|---|---|---|---|---|---|---|
| Walt Kinney | 43 | 202.2 | 9 | 15 | 3.64 | 97 |
| Win Noyes | 10 | 49.0 | 1 | 5 | 5.69 | 20 |
| Socks Seibold | 14 | 45.2 | 2 | 3 | 5.32 | 19 |
| Bob Geary | 9 | 32.1 | 0 | 3 | 4.73 | 9 |
| Jimmy Zinn | 5 | 25.2 | 1 | 3 | 6.31 | 9 |
| Charlie Eckert | 2 | 16.0 | 0 | 1 | 3.94 | 6 |
| Dan Boone | 3 | 14.2 | 0 | 1 | 6.75 | 1 |
| Mule Watson | 4 | 14.1 | 0 | 1 | 6.91 | 6 |
| Ray Roberts | 3 | 14.0 | 0 | 2 | 7.71 | 2 |
| Bill Grevell | 5 | 12.0 | 0 | 0 | 14.25 | 3 |
| William Pierson | 2 | 7.2 | 0 | 0 | 3.52 | 4 |

==== Relief pitchers ====
Note: G = Games pitched; W = Wins; L = Losses; SV = Saves; ERA = Earned run average; SO = Strikeouts

| Player | G | W | L | SV | ERA | SO |
|---|---|---|---|---|---|---|
| Walter Anderson | 3 | 1 | 0 | 0 | 3.86 | 10 |
| Harry Thompson | 3 | 0 | 1 | 0 | 6.75 | 1 |
| Mike Kircher | 2 | 0 | 0 | 0 | 7.88 | 2 |
| Willie Adams | 1 | 0 | 0 | 0 | 3.86 | 0 |

== Awards and honors ==
=== League top ten finishers ===
Rollie Naylor

- #3 in AL in losses (18)

Scott Perry

- #4 in AL in losses (17)

== See also ==
- List of worst Major League Baseball season records
