= 1919 Boston Red Sox season =

Major League Baseball season

1919 Boston Red Sox
- League: American League
- Ballpark: Fenway Park
- City: Boston, Massachusetts
- Record: 66–71 (.482)
- League place: 6th
- Owners: Harry Frazee
- Managers: Ed Barrow
- Stats: ESPN.com; Baseball Reference

The 1919 Boston Red Sox season was the 19th season in the franchise's Major League Baseball history. The Red Sox finished sixth in the American League (AL) with a record of 66 wins and 71 losses, 20 1/2 games behind the Chicago White Sox. The team played its home games at Fenway Park.

While World War I had ended in November 1918, players who had been drafted returned gradually during 1919. The season was shortened from 154 to 140 games and did not begin until mid-April, with the Red Sox playing their first game on April 23.

== Regular season ==
In his last year playing for the Red Sox, Babe Ruth had his breakout offensive season having been converted into an outfielder. He set a major league record with 29 home runs and also led the league in runs batted in and runs scored. Ruth also made 15 pitching starts, going 9–5 with a 2.97 earned run average.

On July 31, Waite Hoyt made his first start for the Boston Red Sox, beating the Detroit Tigers 2–1 in twelve innings for his first major league victory.

=== Trades and Transactions ===
In July, the Red Sox traded pitcher Carl Mays to the Yankees for pitchers Allen Russell and Bob McGraw, as well as $40,000.

In late July, pitcher Waite Hoyt of the independent Baltimore Dry Docks signed a contract to play for the Red Sox for $600 a month.

=== Season standings ===
American League
Team	W	L	Pct.	GB	Home	Road
Chicago White Sox	88	52	.629	—	48‍–‍22	40‍–‍30
Cleveland Indians	84	55	.604	3½	44‍–‍25	40‍–‍30
New York Yankees	80	59	.576	7½	46‍–‍25	34‍–‍34
Detroit Tigers	80	60	.571	8	46‍–‍24	34‍–‍36
St. Louis Browns	67	72	.482	20½	40‍–‍30	27‍–‍42
Boston Red Sox	66	71	.482	20½	35‍–‍30	31‍–‍41
Washington Senators	56	84	.400	32	32‍–‍40	24‍–‍44
Philadelphia Athletics	36	104	.257	52	21‍–‍49	15‍–‍55

=== Record vs. opponents ===
1919 American League record Sources:
Team	BOS	CWS	CLE	DET	NYY	PHA	SLB	WSH
Boston	—	9–11	4–15	9–11	10–9	14–6	9–10–1	11–9
Chicago	11–9	—	12–8	11–9	12–8	17–3	11–9	14–6
Cleveland	15–4	8–12	—	8–12	13–7	16–4	11–9	13–7
Detroit	11–9	9–11	12–8	—	8–12	14–6	14–6	12–8
New York	9–10	8–12	7–13	12–8	—	18–2	12–8	14–6–2
Philadelphia	6–14	3–17	4–16	6–14	2–18	—	7–13	8–12
St. Louis	10–9–1	9–11	9–11	6–14	8–12	13–7	—	12–8
Washington	9–11	6–14	7–13	8–12	6–14–2	12–8	8–12	—

=== Opening Day lineup ===
Harry Hooper	RF
Jack Barry	2B
Amos Strunk	CF
Babe Ruth	LF
Stuffy McInnis	1B
Ossie Vitt	3B
Everett Scott	SS
Wally Schang	C
Carl Mays	P

=== Roster ===
1919 Boston Red Sox
Roster
Pitchers: Joe Bush; Ray Caldwell; George Dumont; Waite Hoyt; Bill James; Sad Sam Jones; Carl Mays; Bob McGraw; Paul Musser; Herb Pennock; Allen Russell; George Winn	Catchers: Norm McNeil; Wally Schang; Roxy Walters; Infielders: Jack Barry; Del Gainer; Stuffy McInnis; Mike McNally; Everett Scott; Red Shannon; Dave Shean; Ossie Vitt	Outfielders: Frank Gilhooley; Harry Hooper; Bill Lamar; Braggo Roth; Babe Ruth; Amos Strunk; Joe Wilhoit	Manager: Ed Barrow

== Player stats ==
=== Batting ===
==== Starters by position ====
Note: Pos = Position; G = Games played; AB = At bats; H = Hits; Avg. = Batting average; HR = Home runs; RBI = Runs batted in

Pos	Player	G	AB	H	Avg.	HR	RBI
C	Wally Schang	113	330	101	.306	0	55
1B	Stuffy McInnis	120	440	134	.305	1	58
2B	Red Shannon	80	290	75	.259	0	17
3B	Ossie Vitt	133	469	114	.243	0	40
SS	Everett Scott	138	507	141	.278	0	38
LF	Babe Ruth	130	432	139	.322	29	114
CF	Braggo Roth	63	227	58	.256	0	23
RF	Harry Hooper	128	491	131	.267	3	49

==== Other batters ====
Note: G = Games played; AB = At bats; H = Hits; Avg. = Batting average; HR = Home runs; RBI = Runs batted in

Player	G	AB	H	Avg.	HR	RBI
Amos Strunk	48	184	50	.272	0	17
Bill Lamar	48	148	43	.291	0	13
Roxy Walters	48	135	26	.193	0	10
Del Gainer	47	118	28	.237	0	18
Frank Gilhooley	48	112	27	.241	0	2
Jack Barry	31	108	26	.241	0	2
Dave Shean	29	100	14	.140	0	6
Mike McNally	33	42	11	.262	0	3
Joe Wilhoit	6	18	6	.333	0	2
Norm McNeil	5	9	3	.333	0	1

=== Pitching ===
==== Starting pitchers ====
Note: G = Games pitched; IP = Innings pitched; W = Wins; L = Losses; ERA = Earned run average; SO = Strikeouts

Player	G	IP	W	L	ERA	SO
Sam Jones	35	245.0	12	20	3.75	67
Herb Pennock	32	219.0	16	8	2.71	70
Carl Mays	21	146.0	5	11	2.47	53
Babe Ruth	17	133.1	9	5	2.97	30
Waite Hoyt	13	105.1	4	6	3.25	28

==== Other pitchers ====
Note: G = Games pitched; IP = Innings pitched; W = Wins; L = Losses; ERA = Earned run average; SO = Strikeouts

Player	G	IP	W	L	ERA	SO
Allen Russell	21	121.1	10	4	2.52	63
Ray Caldwell	18	86.1	7	4	3.96	23
Bill James	13	72.2	3	5	4.09	12
Paul Musser	5	19.2	0	2	4.12	14
Joe Bush	2	7.0	0	0	3.86	2

==== Relief pitchers ====
Note: G = Games pitched; W = Wins; L = Losses; SV = Saves; ERA = Earned run average; SO = Strikeouts

Player	G	W	L	SV	ERA	SO
George Dumont	13	0	4	0	4.33	12
Bob McGraw	10	0	2	0	6.75	6
George Winn	3	0	0	0	7.71	0

== Awards and honors ==
=== League top five finishers ===
Sam Jones

- #2 losses (20)

Babe Ruth

- #1 home runs (29)
- #1 runs batted in (114)
- #1 runs scored (103)
- #1 on-base percentage (.456)
- #1 slugging percentage (.657)

Wally Schang

- #2 on-base percentage (.436)
