= M.V. Gannon House =

Historic house in Iowa, United States

- U.S. National Register of Historic Places
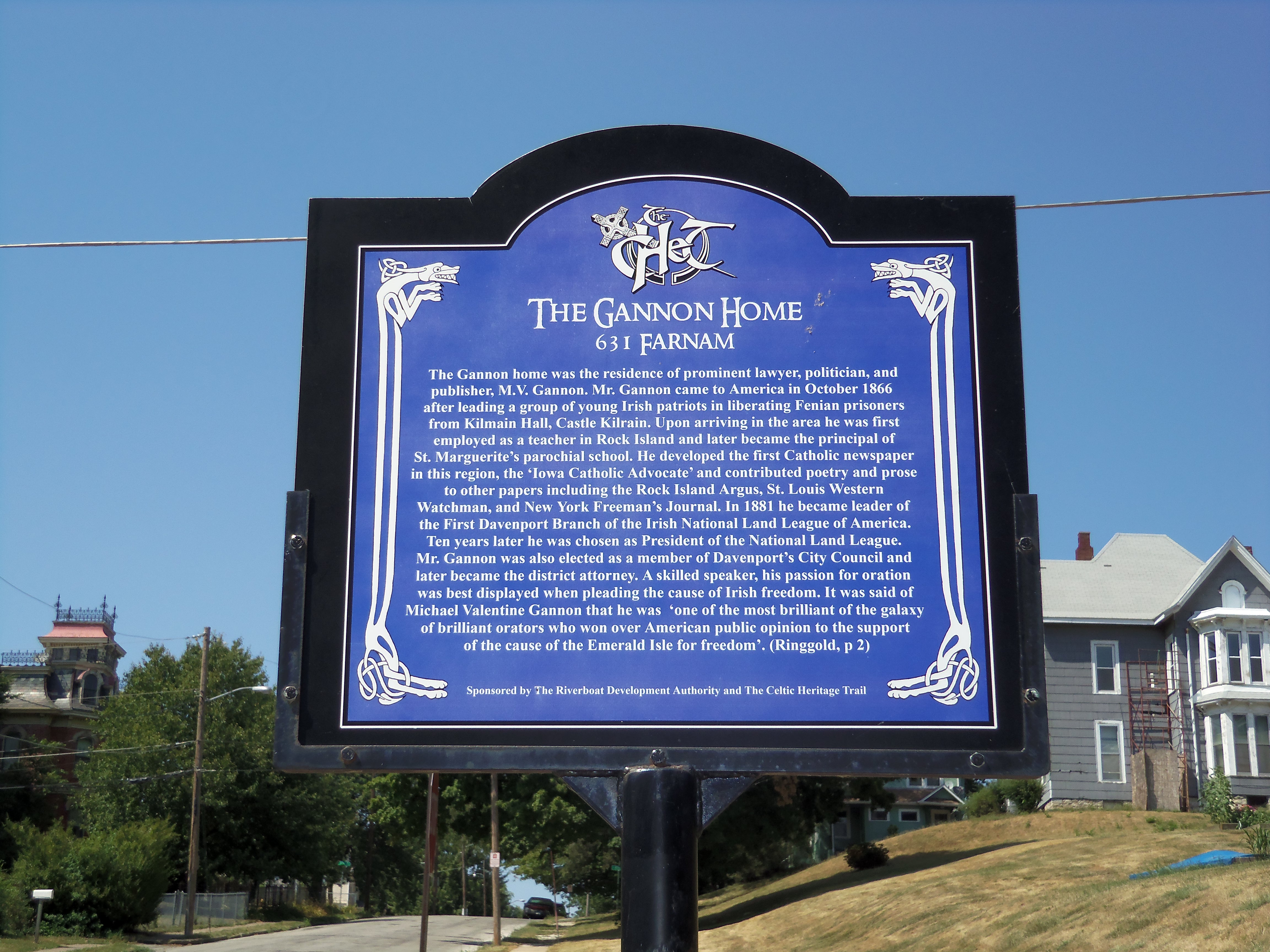
- A sign placed by the Celtic Heritage Trail of the Quad Cities

- Location within Iowa Location within the United States
- Location: 631 Farnam St. Davenport, Iowa
- Coordinates: 41°31′36″N 90°33′59″W
- Area: less than one acre
- Architectural style: Italianate
- MPS: Davenport MRA
- NRHP reference No.: 83002436
- Added to NRHP: July 7, 1983

The M.V. Gannon House was a historic home located on the east side of Davenport, Iowa, United States. It was listed on the National Register of Historic Places in 1983.

== M.V. Gannon ==
Michael Valentine Gannon was a prominent lawyer, politician, and publisher. He was born in Dublin on February 14, 1846, the third of three children born to Michael and Catherine (O'Brien) Gannon. His father died when M.V. was three months old. He was educated in the local common schools. Before he immigrated to the United States, Gannon led a group of Irish patriots to liberate Fenian prisoners from Kilmain Hall, Castle Kilrain.

Gannon arrived in the US in October 1866 and lived for almost a year in New York City. After he came to what was then known as the Tri Cities, he taught in a school in Rock Island, Illinois and then became the principal of St. Marguerite's School in Davenport. In the 1870s he started the first Catholic newspaper in the region, the Iowa Catholic Advocate. He also contributed poetry and prose to other papers including the Rock Island Argus, St. Louis Western Watchman, and the New York Freeman’s Journal. Gannon was admitted to the bar in 1872 and began his political career in the late 1870s as a Democrat. He was elected an alderman in Davenport. In 1881 he took the leadership of the First Davenport Branch of the Irish National Land League of America. Gannon was elected as the local district attorney in 1882. In 1884 he lost the election for Attorney General of Iowa. Throughout his life, Gannon was noted for his speaking skills especially when he spoke in favour of Irish independence.

Gannon was married three times and had nine children. His first wife was Addie Hodges of Geneseo, Illinois. She died four years later and the couple had no children. After several years he married Cecelia Jordan, a school teacher from Davenport. They had five children. She died in 1884. Ten years later he married Mary Johnson of Cable, Illinois. She was the daughter of one of his best friends, Michael Johnson. Gannon, Johnson and his family, immigrated from Ireland together. Mary was five years old at the time. She died in 1898.

Gannon moved from Davenport to Omaha, Nebraska in 1887 and then to Chicago in 1902. He was an active leader in the Irish community in both cities. In 1891 he was elected as President of the Irish National Land League. In 1905 he returned to Davenport and continued his work as an orator and supporter for the Irish cause. He also resumed his law partnership with A.P. McGuirk. Gannon continued to practice law until three years before he died. After he retired he made a return trip to his native Ireland. He died in his home on Charlotte Avenue in Davenport on March 7, 1926.

== Architecture ==
Gannon's house on Farnham Street was Italianate in design. He lived here in the years before he relocated to Omaha. Architecturally, it was less significant than the man who lived there. It featured a hipped roof, bracketed eaves and fancy scroll work on the front porch. The front of the house at one time featured three bays with the main entrance in the left bay. The windows on the front of the building were altered on the first and second floors in later years. The house has subsequently been torn down. A sign placed by the Celtic Heritage Trail of the Quad Cities marks the location of the property.
