= 1919 New York Yankees season =

Season for the Major League Baseball team the New York Yankees

1919 New York Yankees
- League: American League
- Ballpark: Polo Grounds
- City: New York City, New York
- Record: 80–59 (.576)
- League place: 3rd
- Owners: Jacob Ruppert and Tillinghast L'Hommedieu Huston
- Managers: Miller Huggins

The 1919 New York Yankees season was the team's 17th season. The team finished with a record of 80–59, 7½ games behind the American League champion Chicago White Sox. New York was managed by Miller Huggins. Their home games were played at the Polo Grounds.

== Offseason ==
- December 18, 1918: Future Chicago Bears football coach George Halas was signed as a free agent by the Yankees.

== Regular season ==
=== Season standings ===
American League
Team	W	L	Pct.	GB	Home	Road
Chicago White Sox	88	52	.629	—	48‍–‍22	40‍–‍30
Cleveland Indians	84	55	.604	3½	44‍–‍25	40‍–‍30
New York Yankees	80	59	.576	7½	46‍–‍25	34‍–‍34
Detroit Tigers	80	60	.571	8	46‍–‍24	34‍–‍36
St. Louis Browns	67	72	.482	20½	40‍–‍30	27‍–‍42
Boston Red Sox	66	71	.482	20½	35‍–‍30	31‍–‍41
Washington Senators	56	84	.400	32	32‍–‍40	24‍–‍44
Philadelphia Athletics	36	104	.257	52	21‍–‍49	15‍–‍55

=== Record vs. opponents ===
1919 American League record Sources:
Team	BOS	CWS	CLE	DET	NYY	PHA	SLB	WSH
Boston	—	9–11	4–15	9–11	10–9	14–6	9–10–1	11–9
Chicago	11–9	—	12–8	11–9	12–8	17–3	11–9	14–6
Cleveland	15–4	8–12	—	8–12	13–7	16–4	11–9	13–7
Detroit	11–9	9–11	12–8	—	8–12	14–6	14–6	12–8
New York	9–10	8–12	7–13	12–8	—	18–2	12–8	14–6–2
Philadelphia	6–14	3–17	4–16	6–14	2–18	—	7–13	8–12
St. Louis	10–9–1	9–11	9–11	6–14	8–12	13–7	—	12–8
Washington	9–11	6–14	7–13	8–12	6–14–2	12–8	8–12	—

=== Roster ===
1919 New York Yankees
Roster
Pitchers: Carl Mays; Bob McGraw; George Mogridge; Luke Nelson; Lefty O'Doul; Jack Quinn; Allen Russell; Pete Schneider; Bob Shawkey; Ernie Shore; Walt Smallwood; Hank Thormahlen	Catchers: Truck Hannah; Fred Hofmann; Muddy Ruel; Infielders: Frank Baker; Roger Peckinpaugh; Wally Pipp; Del Pratt; Aaron Ward	Outfielders: Ping Bodie; Chick Fewster; Frank Gleich; George Halas; Bill Lamar; Duffy Lewis; Sammy Vick; Al Wickland; Other batters: Frank Kane; Curt Walker	Manager: Miller Huggins; Coaches: Paddy O'Connor

== Player stats ==
=== Batting ===
==== Starters by position ====
Note: Pos = Position; G = Games played; AB = At bats; H = Hits; Avg. = Batting average; HR = Home runs; RBI = Runs batted in

Pos	Player	G	AB	H	Avg.	HR	RBI
C	Muddy Ruel	79	233	56	.240	0	31
1B	Wally Pipp	138	523	144	.275	7	50
2B	Del Pratt	140	527	154	.292	4	56
SS	Roger Peckinpaugh	122	453	138	.305	7	33
3B	Frank Baker	141	567	166	.293	10	83
OF	Ping Bodie	134	475	132	.278	6	59
OF	Duffy Lewis	141	559	152	.272	7	89
OF	Sammy Vick	106	407	101	.248	2	27

==== Other batters ====
Note: G = Games played; AB = At bats; H = Hits; Avg. = Batting average; HR = Home runs; RBI = Runs batted in

Player	G	AB	H	Avg.	HR	RBI
Chick Fewster	81	244	69	.283	1	15
Truck Hannah	75	227	54	.238	1	20
Al Wickland	26	46	7	.152	0	1
Aaron Ward	27	34	7	.206	0	2
George Halas	12	22	2	.091	0	0
Bill Lamar	11	16	3	.188	0	0
Frank Gleich	5	4	1	.250	0	1
Curt Walker	1	1	0	.000	0	0
Fred Hofmann	1	1	0	.000	0	0
Frank Kane	1	1	0	.000	0	0

=== Pitching ===
==== Starting pitchers ====
Note: G = Games pitched; IP = Innings pitched; W = Wins; L = Losses; ERA = Earned run average; SO = Strikeouts

Player	G	IP	W	L	ERA	SO
Jack Quinn	38	266.0	15	14	2.61	97
Bob Shawkey	41	261.1	20	11	2.72	122
Hank Thormahlen	30	188.2	12	8	2.62	62
Carl Mays	13	120.0	9	3	1.65	54

==== Other pitchers ====
Note: G = Games pitched; IP = Innings pitched; W = Wins; L = Losses; ERA = Earned run average; SO = Strikeouts

Player	G	IP	W	L	ERA	SO
George Mogridge	35	169.0	10	9	2.77	58
Ernie Shore	20	95.0	5	8	4.17	24
Allen Russell	23	90.2	5	5	3.47	50
Pete Schneider	7	29.0	0	1	3.41	11

==== Relief pitchers ====
Note: G = Games pitched; W = Wins; L = Losses; SV = Saves; ERA = Earned run average; SO = Strikeouts

Player	G	W	L	SV	ERA	SO
Luke Nelson	9	3	0	0	2.96	11
Walt Smallwood	6	0	0	0	4.98	6
Bob McGraw	6	1	0	0	3.31	3
Lefty O'Doul	3	0	0	0	3.60	2
