= Coveleski =

Coveleski is a surname. Notable people with the surname include:

- Harry Coveleski (1886–1950), American baseball player, brother of Stan
- Stan Coveleski (1889–1984), American baseball player
