= Pleasanton, Nebraska =

Village in Nebraska, US

- town
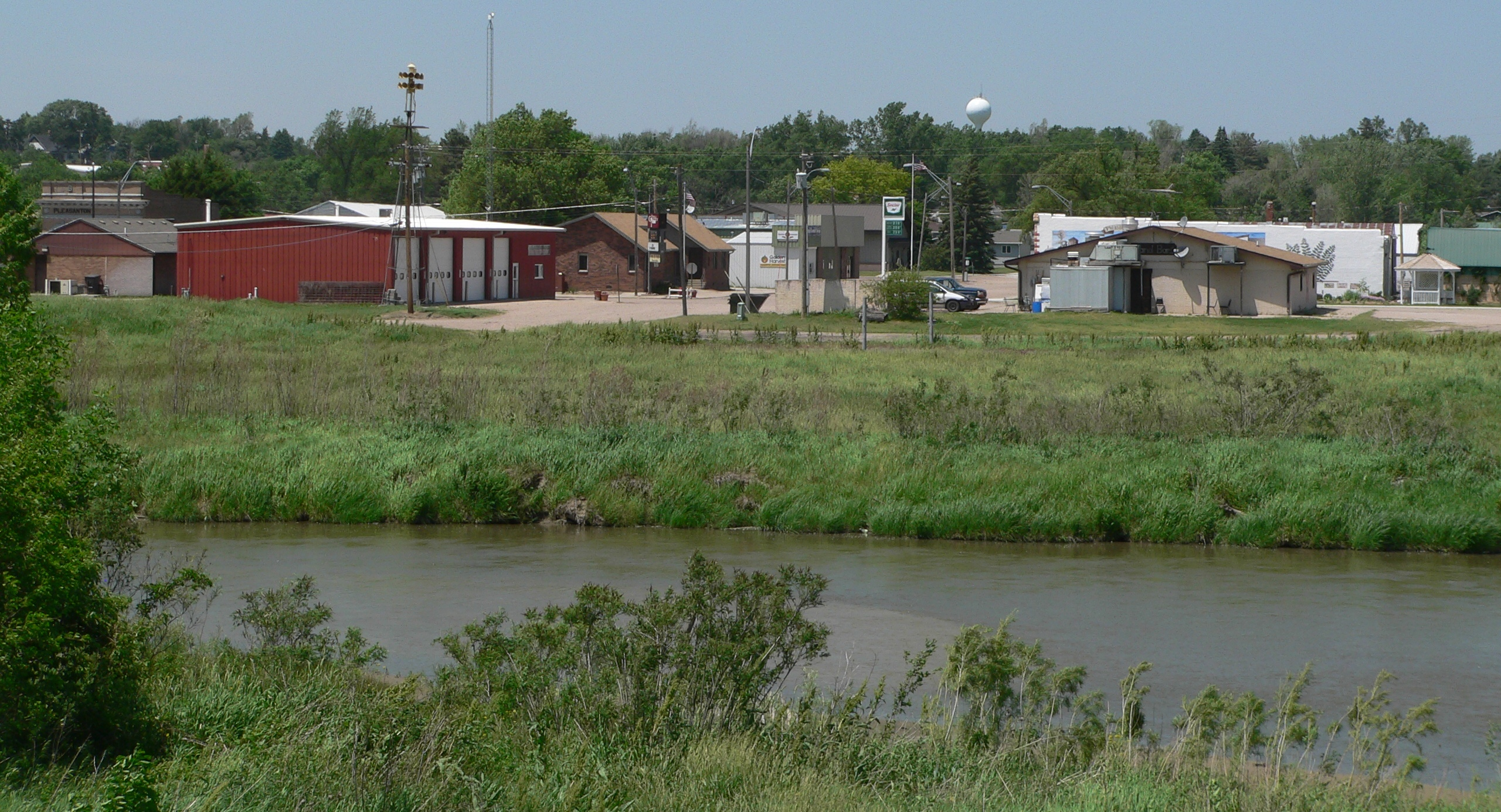
- Pleasanton, looking northwest across the South Loup River

- Location of Pleasanton, Nebraska
- Coordinates: 40°58′12″N 99°05′16″W
- Country: United States
- State: Nebraska
- County: Buffalo

Government
  - Mayor: Dean Smith

Area
  - Total: 0.36 sq mi (0.92 km^{2})
  - Land: 0.36 sq mi (0.92 km^{2})
  - Water: 0 sq mi (0.00 km^{2})
- Elevation: 2,093 ft (638 m)

Population (2020)
  - Total: 361
  - Density: 1,016.1/sq mi (392.31/km^{2})
- Time zone: UTC-6 (Central (CST))
  - Summer (DST): UTC-5 (CDT)
- ZIP code: 68866
- Area code: 308
- FIPS code: 31-39450
- GNIS feature ID: 2398986
- Website: www.pleasantonne.com

Pleasanton is a village in Buffalo County in the state of Nebraska in the Midwestern United States. As of the 2020 census, Pleasanton had a population of 361.

Pleasanton was platted in 1890 when the Union Pacific railroad was extended to that point. It got its name from its location in the Pleasant Valley of the Loup River. Pleasanton was incorporated as a village in 1894.

== History ==
The village was platted in April 1890 when the Union Pacific constructed a branch line of railroad, the Omaha and Republican Valley Railway, from Boelus in Howard County through Ravenna and on to Pleasant Valley. The village was a terminus station for the branch line of railroad located on the north side of the South Loup River called Pleasant Valley. This was also the location of an early settlement called Peters' Bridge. The Peters family was one of the first settlers to the area when they constructed and operated the bridge. Peters' Bridge was the location of a station on the stagecoach and freight line that went north with supplies. A post office was located in an area called South Loup, near the bridge. This area of section 35 of the Loup Township was previously known as Riverview, when the post office was established in 1883. James Hunter became the first postmaster of Riverview. The first regularly scheduled train arrived to the town on March 1, 1890. Local businesses and buildings were quickly constructed at the crossroads. The village schoolhouse was constructed on the south side of the South Loup River. This location served the town of Pleasanton until 1907 when an ice-jam clogged the river and backed the water up into the school. In 1909 a brick schoolhouse was built on top of the hill, above the flood plain. The flood was first of many disasters the village of Pleasanton has endured in its history. The disasters continued when a cyclone occurred in 1890, three fires burned parts of the town between 1892 and 1894, and two major floods occurred in 1924 and 1947. The 1947 flood washed out the railroad tracks that were responsible for the creation of the village. The village went through a growing spurt in the 1970s where 40 new homes were built.

== Pleasanton Public School ==
The school has been in operation since 1890. It is categorized as a class D2 School by the Nebraska School Activities Association, which organizes high schools on a scale from A to D, with D2 being the smallest schools.

== Railroad depot ==
The Pleasanton Railroad Depot located in the center of town was built in 1890. It was constructed during a time where an extension of Burlington Northern and Union Pacific railroads were built in an effort to reach the Black Hills quickly. In 2005 the village board deemed the building a liability, and made plans to tear it down. The Pleasanton High School chapter of Future Business Leaders of America made it their mission to save the deteriorating building. It took eight years of grants and fundraisers to raise the money and renovate the depot.

== Geography ==
According to the United States Census Bureau, the village has a total area of 0.34 square miles (0.88 km^{2}), all land.

== Demographics ==
Historical population
Census	Pop.	Note	%±
1900	103		—
1910	252		144.7%
1920	262		4.0%
1930	282		7.6%
1940	235		−16.7%
1950	188		−20.0%
1960	199		5.9%
1970	261		31.2%
1980	349		33.7%
1990	372		6.6%
2000	360		−3.2%
2010	341		−5.3%
2020	361		5.9%
U.S. Decennial Census

=== 2010 census ===
As of the census of 2010, there were 341 people, 140 households, and 93 families residing in the village. The population density was 1,002.9 inhabitants per square mile (387.2/km^{2}). There were 151 housing units at an average density of 444.1 per square mile (171.5/km^{2}). The racial makeup of the village was 99.7% White and 0.3% from two or more races. Hispanic or Latino of any race were 1.2% of the population.

There were 140 households, of which 34.3% had children under the age of 18 living with them, 56.4% were married couples living together, 7.1% had a female householder with no husband present, 2.9% had a male householder with no wife present, and 33.6% were non-families. 30.0% of all households were made up of individuals, and 16.5% had someone living alone who was 65 years of age or older. The average household size was 2.44 and the average family size was 3.05.

The median age in the village was 35.8 years. 28.2% of residents were under the age of 18; 8.1% were between the ages of 18 and 24; 23.8% were from 25 to 44; 23.5% were from 45 to 64; and 16.4% were 65 years of age or older. The gender makeup of the village was 48.1% male and 51.9% female.

== Government ==
The Village Board of Pleasanton is made up of five registered voting members of the community. They serve a four-year term and are representatives of the village patrons. The Board consists of Brian Paitz, Brian Pritchard, Keith Rasmussen, Dean Smith, and Randy Tolles. The chairperson of the board is Dean Smith, who is also the elected mayor.

== Old Settlers ==
Old Settlers is the village's annual weekend celebration that takes place on the first weekend in June. The weekend event consists of local businesses sponsoring activities for the residents of Pleasanton to participate in. The celebration starts with a parade, Fun Run & Walk, carnival, 3-on-3 basketball tournament, volleyball tournament, and a community theater play on Saturday. Sunday consists of a hamburger feed, softball tournament, and paintball tournament. The celebration has a general theme for the weekend and floats in the parade are decorated accordingly. The celebration resumed its festivities in 2003 after a 13-year hiatus when the village celebrated its centennial anniversary in 1990. Old Settlers is organized and ran by the Pleasanton Community Improvement Committee.

== Parks ==
=== Rosalia Klein Park ===
Klein Park was built in 2008 and funded by a Nebraska Arboretum Grant and grant from the Pleasanton Community Foundation. Community members volunteered to build the park to beautify the entrance into the town. The park consists of a gazebo, sidewalks, seating, and a mural of 1900 Pleasanton.

=== Splash Park ===
The park serves as a combination of a playground and a fountain for the children and residents of the community. The park was completed in 2010 and was funded by a grant from the Nebraska Game and Parks Commission.

== Churches ==
There are four churches in Pleasanton. The Pleasanton United Methodist Church was established in 1899. Grace Lutheran Church was established in 1906. St. Mary's Catholic Church was built in 1909, and then replaced with a new church in 1960. Pleasanton Evangelical Free Church was established in 1982.

== Notable person ==
- Win Noyes, baseball player
