= Tony Faeth =

American baseball player (1893–1982)

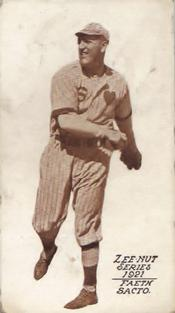
- Pitcher
- Born: July 9, 1893; Aberdeen, South Dakota, U.S.
- Died: December 22, 1982 (aged 89); St. Paul, Minnesota, U.S.
- Batted: Right Threw: Right

MLB debut
- August 10, 1919, for the Cleveland Indians

Last MLB appearance
- July 27, 1920, for the Cleveland Indians

MLB statistics
- Win–loss record: 0-0
- Earned run average: 2.70
- Strikeouts: 21
- Stats at Baseball Reference

Teams
- Cleveland Indians (1919–1920)

Anthony Joseph Faeth (July 9, 1893 – December 22, 1982) was an American Major League Baseball pitcher who played for two seasons. He pitched for the Cleveland Indians for six games during the 1919 Cleveland Indians season and 13 games during the 1920 Cleveland Indians season.

Faeth began his professional career with the Virginia Ore Diggers of the Northern League, and played with them from 1913 to 1915; he had win–loss records of 9-16, 12-18, and 10-15 in those three seasons. He then spent the rest of 1915 and 1916 with the Milwaukee Brewers of the American Association, and has win–loss records of 2-2 and 8-19 in those seasons. Faeth spent the 1917 season with the Grand Rapids Black Sox of the Central League, and finished the season with a 20-8 record.

In 1918, he re-joined the Brewers, and played with them through the 1919 season. After a 5-3 record in 1918, the Brewers noted that Faeth's pitching ability and confidence had taken a turn for the better, and he finished the season with a 3.24 earned run average (ERA) in 35 games. After the Brewers' season ended, Faeth joined the Cleveland Indians and made his major league debut on August 10. He pitched in six games for the Indians that season had a 0.49 ERA in those games. In 1920, he pitched in 13 games and had a 4.32 ERA. On August 21, he was traded by the Indians with Dick Niehaus to the Sacramento Senators for Duster Mails, and finished the season there.

Faeth split 1921 with Sacramento and the Vernon Tigers, then spent 1922 with Vernon and 1923 with the Mobile Bears and the Nashville Volunteers. In 1924, he spent the season with the St. Paul Saints, and had a 15-4 record and 3.45 ERA in 39 games; he was noted as the league's best pitcher that season thanks in part to his high win percentage. After not playing in 1925, Faeth spent 1926 with the Columbus Senators and Indianapolis Indians, then returned to the Saints in 1927, pitching in two games before retiring from baseball. He died in 1982.
