= 1919 Cleveland Indians season =

1919 Cleveland Indians
- League: American League
- Ballpark: Dunn Field
- City: Cleveland, Ohio
- Record: 84–55 (.604)
- League place: 2nd
- Owners: Jim Dunn
- Managers: Lee Fohl, Tris Speaker

The 1919 Cleveland Indians season was a season in American baseball. The team finished second in the American League with a record of 84–55, 3.5 games behind the Chicago White Sox.

== Regular season ==
=== Season standings ===
American League
Team	W	L	Pct.	GB	Home	Road
Chicago White Sox	88	52	.629	—	48‍–‍22	40‍–‍30
Cleveland Indians	84	55	.604	3½	44‍–‍25	40‍–‍30
New York Yankees	80	59	.576	7½	46‍–‍25	34‍–‍34
Detroit Tigers	80	60	.571	8	46‍–‍24	34‍–‍36
St. Louis Browns	67	72	.482	20½	40‍–‍30	27‍–‍42
Boston Red Sox	66	71	.482	20½	35‍–‍30	31‍–‍41
Washington Senators	56	84	.400	32	32‍–‍40	24‍–‍44
Philadelphia Athletics	36	104	.257	52	21‍–‍49	15‍–‍55

=== Record vs. opponents ===
1919 American League record Sources:
Team	BOS	CWS	CLE	DET	NYY	PHA	SLB	WSH
Boston	—	9–11	4–15	9–11	10–9	14–6	9–10–1	11–9
Chicago	11–9	—	12–8	11–9	12–8	17–3	11–9	14–6
Cleveland	15–4	8–12	—	8–12	13–7	16–4	11–9	13–7
Detroit	11–9	9–11	12–8	—	8–12	14–6	14–6	12–8
New York	9–10	8–12	7–13	12–8	—	18–2	12–8	14–6–2
Philadelphia	6–14	3–17	4–16	6–14	2–18	—	7–13	8–12
St. Louis	10–9–1	9–11	9–11	6–14	8–12	13–7	—	12–8
Washington	9–11	6–14	7–13	8–12	6–14–2	12–8	8–12	—

=== Roster ===
1919 Cleveland Indians
Roster
Pitchers: Jim Bagby; Ray Caldwell; Fritz Coumbe; Stan Coveleski; Joe Engel; Johnny Enzmann; Tony Faeth; Charlie Jamieson; Hi Jasper; Ed Klepfer; Guy Morton; Elmer Myers; Tom Phillips; George Uhle	Catchers: Les Nunamaker; Steve O'Neill; Pinch Thomas; Infielders: Ray Chapman; Joe Evans; Larry Gardner; Joe Harris; Doc Johnston; Harry Lunte; Bill Wambsganss	Outfielders: Jack Graney; Elmer Smith; Tris Speaker; Joe Wood	Manager: Lee Fohl; Tris Speaker

== Player stats ==
=== Batting ===
==== Starters by position ====
Note: Pos = Position; G = Games played; AB = At bats; H = Hits; Avg. = Batting average; HR = Home runs; RBI = Runs batted in

Pos	Player	G	AB	H	Avg.	HR	RBI
C	Steve O'Neill	125	398	115	.289	2	47
1B	Doc Johnston	102	331	101	.305	1	33
2B	Bill Wambsganss	139	526	146	.278	2	60
SS	Ray Chapman	115	433	130	.300	3	53
3B	Larry Gardner	139	524	157	.300	2	79
OF	Jack Graney	128	461	108	.234	1	30
OF	Elmer Smith	114	395	110	.278	9	54
OF	Tris Speaker	134	494	146	.296	2	63

==== Other batters ====
Note: G = Games played; AB = At bats; H = Hits; Avg. = Batting average; HR = Home runs; RBI = Runs batted in

Player	G	AB	H	Avg.	HR	RBI
Joe Wood	72	192	49	.255	0	27
Joe Harris	62	184	69	.375	1	46
Harry Lunte	26	77	15	.195	0	2
Les Nunamaker	26	56	14	.250	0	7
Pinch Thomas	34	46	5	.109	0	2
Joe Evans	21	14	1	.071	0	0

=== Pitching ===
==== Starting pitchers ====
Note: G = Games pitched; IP = Innings pitched; W = Wins; L = Losses; ERA = Earned run average; SO = Strikeouts

Player	G	IP	W	L	ERA	SO
Stan Coveleski	43	286.0	24	12	2.61	118
Jim Bagby	35	241.1	17	11	2.80	61
Guy Morton	26	147.1	9	9	2.81	64
Hi Jasper	12	82.2	4	5	3.59	25
Ray Caldwell	6	52.2	5	1	1.71	24

==== Other pitchers ====
Note: G = Games pitched; IP = Innings pitched; W = Wins; L = Losses; ERA = Earned run average; SO = Strikeouts

Player	G	IP	W	L	ERA	SO
Elmer Myers	23	134.2	8	7	3.74	38
George Uhle	26	127.0	10	5	2.91	50
Johnny Enzmann	14	55.1	3	2	2.28	13
Charlie Jamieson	4	13.0	0	0	5.54	0

==== Relief pitchers ====
Note: G = Games pitched; W = Wins; L = Losses; SV = Saves; ERA = Earned run average; SO = Strikeouts

Player	G	W	L	SV	ERA	SO
Tom Phillips	22	3	2	0	2.95	18
Fritz Coumbe	8	1	1	1	5.32	7
Tony Faeth	6	0	0	0	0.49	7
Ed Klepfer	5	0	0	0	7.36	7
Smokey Joe Wood	1	0	0	1	0.00	0
Joe Engel	1	0	0	0	inf	0
