= Ralph Young (baseball) =

American baseball player (1888–1965)

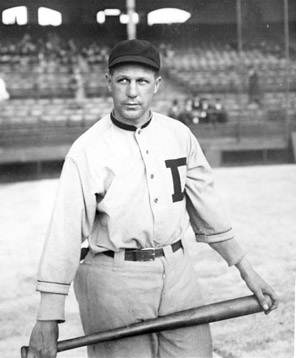
- Second baseman
- Born: September 19, 1888; Philadelphia, Pennsylvania, U.S.
- Died: January 24, 1965 (aged 76); Philadelphia, Pennsylvania, U.S.
- Batted: Switch Threw: Right

MLB debut
- April 10, 1913, for the New York Yankees

Last MLB appearance
- September 29, 1922, for the Philadelphia Athletics

MLB statistics
- Batting average: .247
- Home runs: 4
- Runs batted in: 254
- Stats at Baseball Reference

Teams
- New York Yankees (1913); Detroit Tigers (1915–1921); Philadelphia Athletics (1922)

Ralph Stuart Young (September 19, 1888 – January 24, 1965), commonly known as "Pep", was an American professional baseball player and coach.

A native of Philadelphia, Young played nine seasons in Major League Baseball (MLB), principally as a second baseman, from 1913 to 1922, including nine seasons in Major League Baseball with the New York Yankees in 1913, the Detroit Tigers from 1915 to 1921, and the Philadelphia Athletics in 1922. He threw right-handed and batted as a switch hitter. Over the course of Young's big league career, he appeared in 1,022 games, 993 as a second baseman, and compiled a .247 batting average. Fueled by a disciplined batting eye, Young's on-base percentage was nearly 100 points higher at .339. He collected 495 bases on balls and struck out only 235 times in 4,342 plate appearances. Young was also known as one of the best defensive second baseman in the American League (AL) during his playing career until a back injury in 1921 led to erratic throwing.

After Young's playing career ended, he served as a college baseball coach in Philadelphia for the Temple Owls baseball team from 1932 to 1942 and for the Saint Joseph's Hawks baseball team from 1948 to 1955. In 19 seasons as a head coach, Young compiled a 158–154 win–loss record.

== Early years ==
Young was born in 1888 in Philadelphia. His father operated a grocery store in Philadelphia. He attended Washington College in Chestertown, Maryland.

== Professional baseball ==
=== Minor leagues ===
Young began playing professional baseball in 1910 and 1911 with the Scranton Miners. He continued to play in the minor leagues with the Steubenville Stubs in 1911 and the Harrisburg Senators in 1911 and 1912. In 1912, he drew attention after he compiled a .308 batting average in 357 at bats, scored 79 runs, stole 31 bases, and in 80 games at shortstop garnered 284 assists and 165 putouts with a .941 fielding percentage.

While playing in the minors, he earned the nickname "Pep". According to a 1913 newspaper account: "He is the sort of player much sought by the big leaguers. One who is on his toes all the time, chock full of life and ginger. It was his great display of energy in the minors that earned him the nickname of 'Pep.'" Former major league shortstop and manager Arthur Irwin called Young as promising a young shortstop as he ever saw.

=== New York Yankees ===
In January 1913, Young signed with the New York Yankees. He appeared in his first major league game on April 10, 1913. He appeared in only seven games for the Yankees, all as the team's starting shortstop, compiled a .067 batting average in 15 at bats, and committed five errors. Roger Peckinpaugh won the job as the Yankees' regular shortstop, and on April 27, 1913, the Yankees released Young to the Sacramento Sacts of the Pacific Coast League (PCL).

=== Sacramento Sacts ===
Young appeared in 160 games for Sacramento in 1913. His father was opposed to Young choosing baseball as a career and offered him a fifty percent stake in the family grocery store if Young would give up baseball at the end of the 1913 season. Young announced his retirement, but changed his mind and returned to Sacramento in 1914. He appeared in 199 games in 1914, and his batting average rose to .275. In September 1914, pitcher John Birdie Williams said of Young: "Pep Young is the best infielder on the coast today. He is a wonderful fielder, a great base runner, a fine man to get passes, and he used to be a fairly good hitter. . . . The best description I can give is that he is a second Donie Bush, and you know what that means."

=== Detroit Tigers ===
On August 12, 1914, Young was sold by Sacramento to the Detroit Tigers on the condition he would finish the 1914 season with Sacramento. Young remained as the Tigers' starting second baseman for seven seasons from 1915 to 1921.

During his first year with the Tigers, Young received daily, one-on-one batting instruction from the team's center fielder, Ty Cobb. During the 1915 Tigers season, the club compiled a 100–54 for the second highest winning percentage (.649) in franchise history. Young appeared in 123 games for the 1915 Tigers, including 113 as the team's starting second baseman. He only managed to compile a .243 batting average in 1915, but he demonstrated a sharp batting eye and drew 53 bases on balls to boost his on-base percentage to .339. He led the American League's second basemen with 32 errors, but showed promise in also ranking highly among the league second basemen with 371 assists (fourth), a 5.46 range factor per nine innings (fourth), 233 putouts (fifth), 44 double plays turned (fifth), and a .950 fielding percentage (fifth).

Throughout his career, Young's offensive contributions were fueled by his discipline as a batter and an ability to collect bases on balls and avoid striking out. At five feet, five inches, Young's small stature assisted in allowing for a correspondingly small strike zone. In 1916, he drew 62 bases on balls for a .342 on-base percentage. In 1918, he actually drew nearly as many walks (54) as hits (56) and struck out only 17 times in 368 plate appearances. Over the course of his career, Young collected 495 bases on balls and struck out only 254 times in 4,341 plate appearances.

Whether due to the tutelage of Ty Cobb or the arrival of the live-ball era, Young's offensive numbers jumped dramatically in 1920. That year, he had a batting average of .291 (up from .211 the prior year) and an on-base percentage of .406. He had a career highs with 173 hits and 85 walks, with only 30 strikeouts in 705 plate appearances.

Young saw his offensive numbers climb further in 1921, as he hit for a career high .299 batting average and a .406 on-base percentage. The 1921 season saw remarkable hitting throughout the Detroit lineup. The 1921 Tigers still hold the American League record for highest single season team batting average at .316. Of the starting position players, only Young and shortstop Donie Bush, who was traded to the Washington Senators in August, failed to break the .300 mark, and Young only missed by one point. But true to the adage that "good pitching beats good hitting", the 1921 Tigers lacked strong pitching and finished in sixth place, 27 games behind the Yankees, despite averaging 5.7 runs per game.

Despite his abilities as a contact hitter, Young's greatest contribution came in his fielding. In eight seasons as a second baseman (1915–1922), Young proved to be a talented fielder. In 1919, Young's range factor rating of 5.70 was 51 points higher than the league average for second basemen. He collected season highs of 405 putouts (1920), 449 assists (1917), and 55 double plays (1916). His 449 assists was tops among American League second basemen in 1917, though he also led the league's second basemen in errors in 1915 and 1918. For his career, he collected 2,411 putouts, 3,009 assists, and 359 double plays.

Young was also involved in three triple plays as a second baseman, including one of the most unusual double plays in history. On May 18, 1921, in a game against the Boston Red Sox at home in Detroit, Young started a 4–4–6 double play (i.e., second basemen makes two outs and third basemen makes the final out) – one of only three such plays in MLB history.

After years of reliable defensive play, Young began to have problems with the accuracy of his throws in 1921. One writer noted:

"His arm suddenly went wrong, and try as he might he couldn't make the short toss to first base with any degree of accuracy. Time after time he would make a sensational stop only to follow it with a weird throw to the cushion. His whip seemed to become paralyzed momentarily with the result that batsmen were getting "lifes" with what should have been certain outs. Young's trouble was mental, as he could throw with great speed, but no accuracy."

Young's erratic throwing led to his removal from the lineup in the latter part of the 1921 season. During the off-season, Young stated than an x-ray had revealed that he had been playing with a "dislocated vertebrae" for which he was undergoing treatment in Philadelphia.

=== Philadelphia Athletics ===
On April 3, 1922, the Tigers placed Young on waivers. Ty Cobb said at the time that he doubted whether Young would regain his old form. On April 7, he was claimed off waivers by Connie Mack and the Philadelphia Athletics. This gave Young the opportunity to play for his home town team. Young appeared in 125 games for the 1922 Athletics, including 116 games as the team's starting second baseman. Young's arrival required the Athletics' second baseman, Jimmy Dykes, to move to third base for the 1922 season. Young compiled a .223 batting average and .309 on-base percentage in 1923. Young spent only one season with the Athletics, appearing in his last major league game on September 29, 1922.

On February 7, 1923, Young was given an unconditional release by the Athletics. At the time of his release, one writer noted it marked "the passing of one of the smartest men in the game," an individual who "played 'heads up' baseball, and in his prime was considered one of the best second sackers in the majors."

=== Minor leagues ===
In February 1923, Young was offered a contract by the Rochester Red Wings of the International League. He declined the offer and retired from professional baseball. He reportedly signed a contract in March 1923 with a club in Chester, Pennsylvania. In a game played on June 30, 1923, Young had five hits for Chester, matching the hit total of the entire opposing team. He was reportedly "instrumental" in helping Chester win a pennant in 1923.

== College coaching career ==
After his career as a professional baseball player, Young coached college baseball in his hometown of Philadelphia. On March 1, 1932, he was hired as the head coach of the Temple Owls baseball team. He remained the head coach at Temple for 11 seasons from 1932 to 1942. He compiled a 110–85 record at Temple. In November 1942, Young was granted a leave of absence from Temple to serve for the duration of World War II as an associate inspector of engineering machinery at a war plant.

On March 23, 1948, Young was hired as the head coach of the Saint Joseph's Hawks baseball team. He coached at Saint Joseph's from 1948 to 1955. He compiled a 48–69 record in eight years at Saint Joseph's. He was inducted into the Saint Joseph's University Baseball Hall of Fame in 2000.

== Later years ==
In January 1965, Young died in Philadelphia after a brief illness at age 76. He was survived by his wife and a daughter.
