= Luke Nelson (baseball) =

American baseball player (1893-1985)

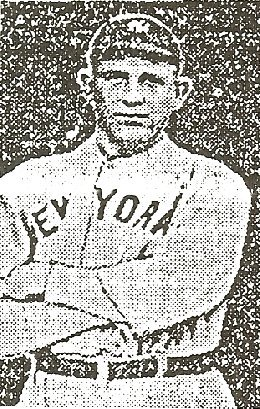
- Pitcher
- Born: December 4, 1893; Cable, Illinois
- Died: November 14, 1985 (aged 91); Moline, Illinois
- Batted: Right Threw: Right

MLB debut
- May 25, 1919, for the New York Yankees

Last MLB appearance
- July 11, 1919, for the New York Yankees

MLB statistics
- Win–loss record: 3–0
- Earned run average: 2.96
- Strikeouts: 11
- Stats at Baseball Reference

Teams
- New York Yankees (1919)

Luther Martin "Luke" Nelson (December 4, 1893 – November 14, 1985) was a Major League Baseball pitcher. Nelson played for the New York Yankees in 1919. In nine career games, he had a 3–0 record with a 2.96 ERA. He batted and threw right-handed.

Nelson died at Moline Public Hospital in Moline, Illinois on November 14, 1985 at the age of 91. He would be buried at St. John's Cemetery in Viola, Illinois.
