= George Cunningham (baseball) =

American baseball player (1894–1972)

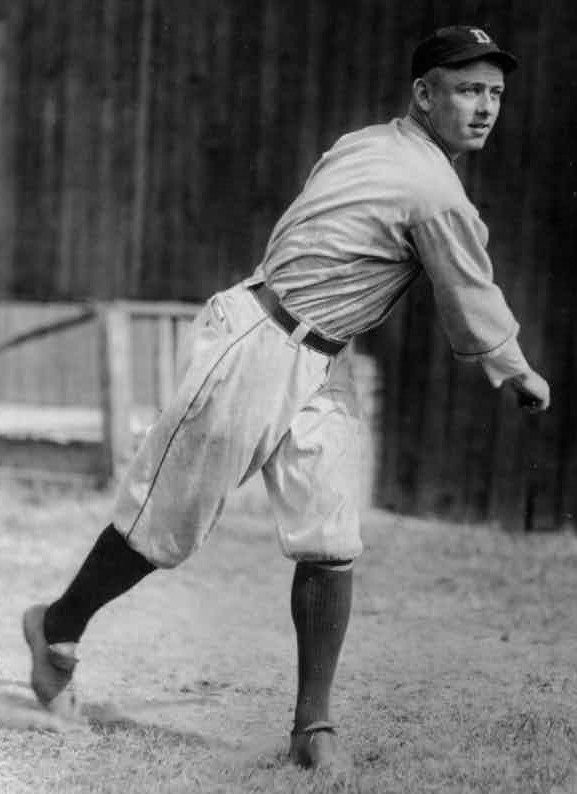
- Pitcher
- Born: July 13, 1894; Sturgeon Lake, Minnesota, U.S.
- Died: March 10, 1972 (aged 77); Chattanooga, Tennessee, U.S.
- Batted: Right Threw: Right

MLB debut
- April 14, 1916, for the Detroit Tigers

Last MLB appearance
- May 2, 1919, for the Detroit Tigers

MLB statistics
- Win–loss record: 16–25
- Earned run average: 3.13
- Strikeouts: 167
- Stats at Baseball Reference

Teams
- Detroit Tigers (1916–1919, 1921)

George Harold Cunningham (July 13, 1894 – March 10, 1972) was an American baseball pitcher. He played professional baseball for 14 years, from 1914 to 1927, including parts of five seasons in Major League Baseball with the Detroit Tigers from 1916 to 1919 and in 1921. Cunningham appeared in 162 major league games, 123 as a pitcher, compiling a 16–25 win–loss record with a 3.13 earned run average (ERA). He also played for the Chattanooga Lookouts in 1915 and 1920 to 1927.

== Early years ==
Cunningham was born in Sturgeon Lake, Minnesota, in 1894.

== Professional baseball ==
Cunningham began his career in professional baseball in 1914 with Duluth White Sox of the Northern League. He appeared in 45 games for Duluth and compiled a 23–10 record.

In 1915, Cunningham attended spring training with the Detroit Tigers, but was farmed out on April 2, 1915, to the Chattanooga Lookouts of the Southern Association. He appeared in 46 games for the Lookouts and compiled a 24–12 record. Despite playing for a team with a losing record, Cunningham led the Southern Association with a .667 winning percentage.

On August 15, 1915, the Lookouts sold Cunningham back to the Detroit Tigers with the caveat that he need not report to Detroit until the Lookouts' season had ended. On March 29, 1916, Cunningham pitched a shutout in a spring training game with E. A. Batchelor writing that the spitball was his "most deadly weapon". Cunningham remained with the Tigers for a total of four years from 1916 to 1919, pitched in 123 games for the Tigers, including 36 as a starter, and compiled a record of 16–25 with a 3.13 earned run average (ERA) in 477 innings pitched. During the 1917 season, he ranked among the American League leaders with 44 pitching appearances (tenth) and 24 games finished (second).

Cunningham was also a strong hitter for a pitcher. He had a career on-base percentage of .337 (.438 in 1919), 36 walks, 10 extra base hits and 13 RBIs. When Cunningham complained to manager Hughie Jennings about the injury-depleted Tiger outfield of 1918, Jennings had Cunningham play right field for three weeks. He appeared in 20 games as an outfielder in 1918, including 14 as the team's starting right fielder.

In 1920, Cunningham returned to Chattanooga, appearing in 40 games and compiling a 19–21 record. On May 2, 1921, Cunningham returned briefly to the Tigers, appearing in one game as a right fielder without having a plate appearance. He was promptly returned to Chattanooga where he continued to play from 1921 to 1927. He also played for the Birmingham Barons of the Southern Association from 1926 to 1927.

== Later years ==
Cunningham died in 1972 at age 77 in Chattanooga, Tennessee.
