= Joe Schepner =

American baseball player (1895-1959)

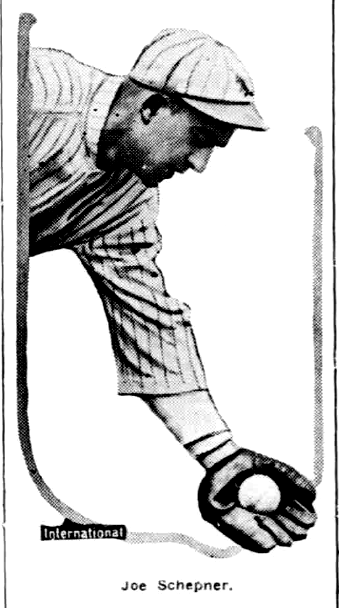
- Third baseman
- Born: August 10, 1895; Aliquippa, Pennsylvania, U.S.
- Died: July 25, 1959 (aged 63); Mobile, Alabama, U.S.
- Batted: Right Threw: Right

MLB debut
- September 11, 1919, for the St. Louis Browns

Last MLB appearance
- September 28, 1919, for the St. Louis Browns

MLB statistics
- Batting average: .208
- Home runs: 0
- Runs batted in: 6
- Stats at Baseball Reference

Teams
- St. Louis Browns (1919)

Joseph Maurice Schepner (August 10, 1895 – September 28, 1959), nicknamed "Gentleman Joe", was an American professional baseball player. He was a third baseman for one season (1919) with the St. Louis Browns. For his career, he compiled a .208 batting average in 48 at-bats, with six runs batted in. He also played in the minor leagues from 1916 to 1932.

Schepner also managed several baseball teams, including the 1929 and 1932 Knoxville Smokies that later became Tennessee Smokies.
