= Bill Grevell =

American baseball player (1898-1923)

- Born: March 5, 1898; Williamstown, New Jersey, U.S.
- Died: June 21, 1923 (aged 25); Philadelphia, Pennsylvania, U.S.

MLB debut
- May 14, 1919, for the Philadelphia Athletics

Last MLB appearance
- July 26, 1919, for the Philadelphia Athletics

MLB statistics
- Win–loss record: 0–0
- Earned run average: 14.25
- Strikeouts: 3
- Stats at Baseball Reference

Teams
- Philadelphia Athletics (1919)

William Joseph Grevell (March 5, 1898 – June 21, 1923) was an American Major League Baseball pitcher. He played for the Philadelphia Athletics during the 1919 season.
