= Eric Erickson (baseball) =

American baseball player (1892–1965)

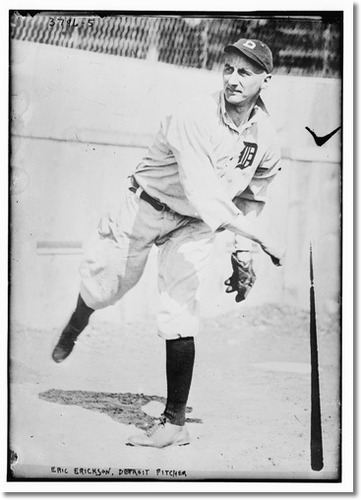
- Pitcher
- Born: March 13, 1892; Vårgårda, Sweden
- Died: May 19, 1965 (aged 73); Jamestown, New York, U.S.
- Batted: Right Threw: Right

MLB debut
- October 6, 1914, for the New York Giants

Last MLB appearance
- September 29, 1922, for the Washington Senators

MLB statistics
- Win–loss record: 34–57
- Earned run average: 3.85
- Strikeouts: 367
- Stats at Baseball Reference

Teams
- New York Giants (1914); Detroit Tigers (1916, 1918–1919); Washington Senators (1919–1922)

Eric George Adolph Erickson (March 13, 1892 – May 19, 1965), nicknamed "Swat", was an American professional baseball pitcher. He played professional baseball for 12 years from 1914 to 1925, including seven years in the major leagues with the New York Giants (1914), Detroit Tigers (1916, 1918–1919), and Washington Senators (1919–1922). He compiled a career win–loss record of 34–57 with a 3.85 earned run average (ERA).

== Early years ==
Eric Erickson was born in Vårgårda, Sweden, in 1892. His parents, Selma (née Larson) and Swan Erickson, had emigrated to the United States years earlier, but Eric was born while they were vising their homeland.

== Professional baseball ==
Erickson was the second player born in Sweden to play in the major leagues. Erickson was a right-handed pitcher who debuted with the Giants in 1914. Erickson pitched in only one game for the Giants, going five innings and giving up seven runs, though none were earned. In 1916, the Detroit Tigers gave Erickson a second chance, and he played parts of three seasons in Detroit, never having a winning season. He was traded to the Senators in 1919 and had his best seasons there. In 1919, as a teammate of Walter Johnson, Erickson led the American League in strikeouts per nine innings with 5.52, though he also was among the league leaders in hit batsmen and wild pitches. In 1921, Erickson was among the league leaders in ERA (3.62), strikeouts per nine innings (3.57), shutouts (3) and hit batsmen (11).

Erickson also pitched for several minor league teams. He led the San Francisco Seals to a Pacific Coast League pennant in 1917 and won the 1917 PCL pitching Triple Crown, winning 31 games with a 1.93 earned run average and 307 strikeouts in 444 innings.

== Later years ==
After his days in professional baseball, he worked in the shipping department of a metal company and also ran a farm. He died in 1965 at the age of 73 in Jamestown, New York.
