= Rolla Mapel =

American baseball player (1890-1966)

- Pitcher
- Born: March 9, 1890; Lee's Summit, Missouri, U.S.
- Died: April 6, 1966 (aged 76); San Diego, California, U.S.
- Batted: Left Threw: Left

MLB debut
- August 31, 1919, for the St. Louis Browns

Last MLB appearance
- September 11, 1919, for the St. Louis Browns

MLB statistics
- Win–loss record: 0–3
- Earned run average: 4.50
- Strikeouts: 2
- Stats at Baseball Reference

Teams
- St. Louis Browns (1919)

Rolla Hamilton Mapel (March 9, 1890 – April 6, 1966) was an American Major League Baseball pitcher who played for the St. Louis Browns in 1919.
