= Frank Fuller (baseball) =

American baseball player (1893–1965)

- Second baseman
- Born: January 1, 1893; Detroit, Michigan, U.S.
- Died: October 29, 1965 (aged 72); Warren, Michigan, U.S.
- Batted: Switch Threw: Right

MLB debut
- April 14, 1915, for the Detroit Tigers

Last MLB appearance
- October 7, 1923, for the Boston Red Sox

MLB statistics
- Batting average: .175
- Hits: 11
- RBI: 3
- Stats at Baseball Reference

Teams
- Detroit Tigers (1915–1916); Boston Red Sox (1923)

Frank Edward Fuller [Rabbit] (January 1, 1893 – October 29, 1965) was an American backup infielder in Major League Baseball, playing mainly at second base from 1915 through 1923 for the Detroit Tigers (1915–1916) and Boston Red Sox (1923). Listed at 5 ft 7 in (1.70 m), 150 lb., Fuller was a switch-hitter and threw right-handed. He was born in Detroit, Michigan.

In a three-season career, Fuller was a .175 hitter (11-for-63) with 11 runs, three RBI, and six stolen bases in 40 games. He did not have any extra-base hits in his major league career.

Fuller died in Warren, Michigan, at the age of 72.
