= John Sullivan (pitcher) =

American baseball player (1894–1958)

- Pitcher
- Born: May 31, 1894; Chicago, Illinois
- Died: July 7, 1958 (aged 64); Chicago, Illinois
- Batted: Left Threw: Left

MLB debut
- July 19, 1919, for the Chicago White Sox

Last MLB appearance
- September 26, 1919, for the Chicago White Sox

MLB statistics
- Win–loss record: 0-1
- Earned run average: 4.20
- Strikeouts: 9
- Stats at Baseball Reference

Teams
- Chicago White Sox (1919)

John Jeremiah "Lefty" Sullivan (May 31, 1894 – July 7, 1958) was a pitcher in Major League Baseball. He played for the Chicago White Sox in 1919.
