= Ben Dyer =

American baseball player (1893–1959)

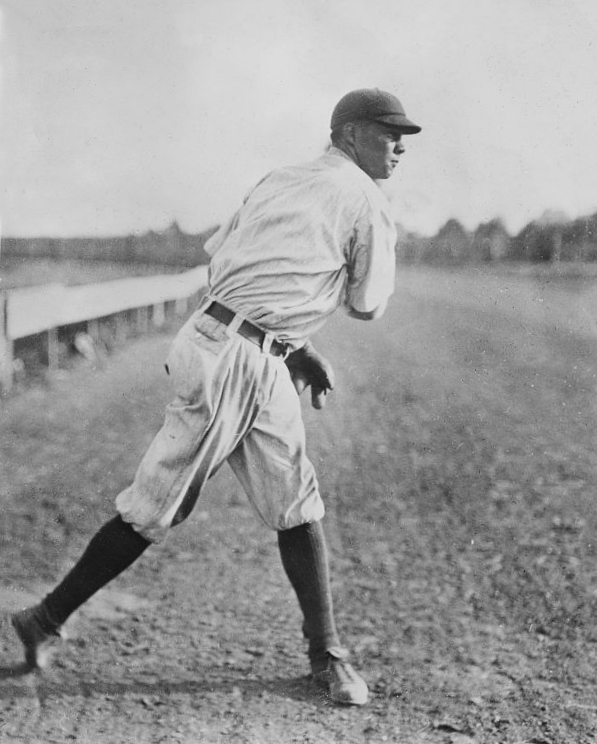
- Infielder
- Born: February 13, 1893; Chicago, Illinois, U.S.
- Died: August 7, 1959 (aged 66); Kenosha, Wisconsin, U.S.
- Batted: Right Threw: Right

MLB debut
- May 23, 1914, for the New York Giants

Last MLB appearance
- September 26, 1919, for the Detroit Tigers

MLB statistics
- Batting average: .237
- Home runs: 0
- Runs batted in: 18
- Stats at Baseball Reference

Teams
- New York Giants (1914–1915); Detroit Tigers (1916–1919)

Benjamin Franklin Dyer (February 13, 1893 – August 7, 1959) was an American Major League Baseball infielder. He played all or part of six seasons in the majors, from 1914 until 1919, for the New York Giants and Detroit Tigers. Dyer played seven different positions in all, but he appeared primarily as a third baseman or shortstop.
