= Cable, Illinois =

- Census-designated place
- Location within Illinois Location within the United States
- Coordinates: 41°16′51″N 90°30′12″W
- Country: United States
- State: Illinois
- County: Mercer
- Township: Richland Grove

Area
  - Total: 1.14 sq mi (2.94 km^{2})
  - Land: 1.14 sq mi (2.94 km^{2})
  - Water: 0 sq mi (0.00 km^{2})
- Elevation: 709 ft (216 m)

Population (2020)
  - Total: 117
  - Density: 103.0/sq mi (39.76/km^{2})
- Time zone: UTC-6 (CST)
  - Summer (DST): UTC-5 (CDT)
- ZIP Code: 61281 (Sherrard)
- FIPS code: 17-10305
- GNIS feature ID: 2806465

Cable is an unincorporated community and census-designated place in Richland Grove Township, Mercer County, Illinois, United States. It is located south of Sherrard. As of the 2020 census, it had a population of 117.

== Geography ==
Cable is located in northeastern Mercer County, on the east side of the valley of Camp Creek, a south-flowing tributary of the Edwards River. The village of Sherrard is 3 miles (5 km) to the north, and Viola is 9 miles (14 km) to the southwest.

According to the United States Census Bureau, the Cable CDP has an area of 1.14 square miles (2.95 km^{2}), all land.

== Demographics ==
Historical population
Census	Pop.	Note	%±
2020	117		—
U.S. Decennial Census

Cable first appeared as a census designated place in the 2020 United States census.

== Notable people ==
- Baby Doll Jacobson, MLB outfielder for numerous teams
- Don Nelson, NBA player and coach.
- Luke Nelson, MLB pitcher for the New York Yankees
