= Harry Coveleski =

American baseball player (1886–1950)

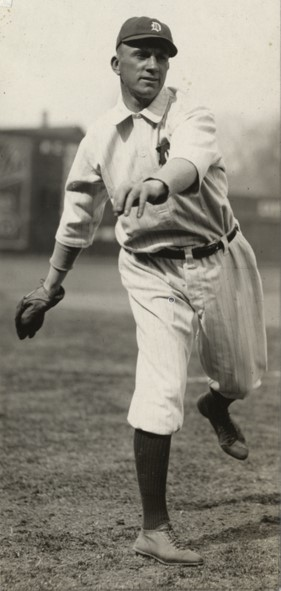
- Coveleski with the Detroit Tigers
- Pitcher
- Born: April 23, 1886; Shamokin, Pennsylvania, U.S.
- Died: August 4, 1950 (aged 64); Shamokin, Pennsylvania, U.S.
- Batted: Both Threw: Left

MLB debut
- September 10, 1907, for the Philadelphia Phillies

Last MLB appearance
- June 23, 1918, for the Detroit Tigers

MLB statistics
- Win–loss record: 81–55
- Earned run average: 2.39
- Strikeouts: 511
- Stats at Baseball Reference

Teams
- Philadelphia Phillies (1907–1909); Cincinnati Reds (1910); Detroit Tigers (1914–1918)

Harry Frank Coveleski (April 23, 1886 – August 4, 1950) was an American Major League Baseball pitcher for the Philadelphia Phillies, Cincinnati Reds, and Detroit Tigers.

== Early life ==
Coveleski was born as the fourth of five ball-playing brothers in the coal-mining community of Shamokin, Pennsylvania. His oldest brother Jacob died while serving in the Spanish–American War, and his other brothers Frank and John played baseball as well, but never reached the major leagues. His younger brother Stan Coveleski played in the majors and went on to become a member of the Baseball Hall of Fame.

== Career ==
Harry Coveleski began his Major League Baseball career with the Philadelphia Phillies in 1907. Over a span of five days at the end of the 1908 season, he beat the New York Giants three times, which enabled the Chicago Cubs to catch the first-place Giants in the NL standings and force a replay of the "Merkle's Boner" game. Thereafter, Coveleski was called "The Giant Killer". Traded to the Reds after the 1909 season, Coveleski had a disappointing 1910 season, including a game in which he walked 16 batters, and was out of the Major Leagues for three seasons.

That year A. H. "Rick" Woodward, owner of the Southern Association's Birmingham Barons, bought Coveleski's contract from the Reds for $1,000, putting him on the team to be showcased in the brand-new steel-and-concrete Rickwood Field stadium. Coveleski got the start on the park's August 18, 1910 opening day, and he earned a no-decision in a 3–2 victory against the Montgomery Climbers in front of 10,000 fans. He ended up pitching two no-hitters for the Barons (though he lost one in extra innings), and won 21 games, including 11 straight decisions, to end the season with a 1.55 ERA. His final appearance for Birmingham was a 1–0 shutout against the league champion New Orleans Pelicans in which he held their star slugger Shoeless Joe Jackson hitless in four appearances.

Following an arm injury, Woodward traded Coveleski to the Chattanooga Lookouts, where he struggled for two seasons, going 25–37, before regaining his composure. In their 1913 campaign he led the Southern Association with 28 wins and attracted the notice of the Detroit Tigers' scouts.

Coveleski joined the Detroit Tigers for the 1914 season and pitched over 300 innings, completed 23 of his 36 games, and won 22 games, second in the American League only to Walter Johnson. In four of his five seasons with the Tigers, Coveleski's earned run average was under three, and his 2.34 ERA with the Tigers is still the franchise's all-time career record.

== Legacy ==
In the 2008–2009 comic book series and the 2017 film, I Kill Giants, protagonist Barbara Thorson's fantasy world features a war hammer named "Coveleski." Barbara explains that it is named after Harry Coveleski and his performance against the New York Giants.

== See also ==
- List of Major League Baseball career ERA leaders
- List of Major League Baseball career WHIP leaders
- List of Detroit Tigers team records
