= Win Noyes =

American baseball player (1889–1969)

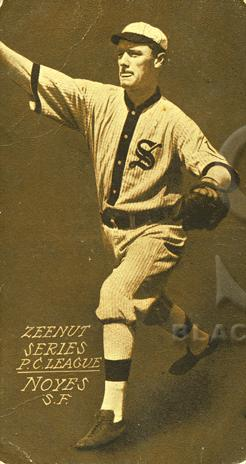
- Pitcher
- Born: June 16, 1889; Pleasanton, Nebraska, U.S.
- Died: April 8, 1969 (aged 79); Cashmere, Washington, U.S.
- Batted: Right Threw: Right

MLB debut
- May 19, 1913, for the Boston Braves

Last MLB appearance
- September 27, 1919, for the Chicago White Sox

MLB statistics
- Win–loss record: 11-15
- Earned run average: 3.76
- Strikeouts: 90
- Stats at Baseball Reference

Teams
- Boston Braves (1913); Philadelphia Athletics (1917, 1919); Chicago White Sox (1919)

Winfield Charles Noyes (June 16, 1889 – April 8, 1969) was an American professional baseball pitcher. He played in Major League Baseball (MLB) for the Boston Braves, Philadelphia Athletics, and Chicago White Sox.

== Minor league career ==
Noyes was born in Pleasanton, Nebraska and attended Nebraska Wesleyan University. He started his professional baseball career in 1910 in the Nebraska State League and went 24-12, leading the league in wins and strikeouts. He had another big season in 1912, going 26-8 for the Spokane Indians in the class B Northwestern League. He was purchased by the Boston Braves in July and pitched sparingly for them in 1913.

Noyes returned to Spokane for the 1914 and 1915 seasons. He won 23 and 22 games in those years. In 1916, he pitched in the Pacific Coast League and won 21 times.

== Major league career ==
Noyes broke into the Athletics starting rotation in 1917. He went 10-10 with a 2.95 earned run average and was one of the best pitchers on the team. However, he sat out the entire 1918 season due to military service. He pitched badly upon his return in 1919 and retired after the season ended.
