= Red Shannon =

American baseball player (1897–1970)

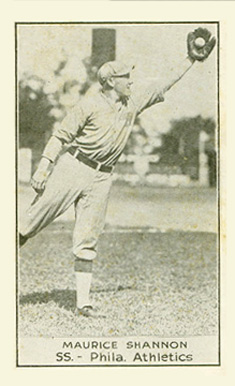
- Infielder
- Born: February 11, 1897; Jersey City, New Jersey, U.S.
- Died: April 12, 1970 (aged 73); Jersey City, New Jersey, U.S.
- Batted: Both Threw: Right

MLB debut
- October 7, 1915, for the Boston Braves

Last MLB appearance
- June 2, 1926, for the Chicago Cubs

MLB statistics
- Batting average: .259
- Triples: 22
- Runs batted in: 91
- Stats at Baseball Reference

Teams
- Boston Braves (1915); Philadelphia Athletics (1917–1919); Boston Red Sox (1919); Washington Senators (1920); Philadelphia Athletics (1920–1921); Chicago Cubs (1926)

Maurice Joseph "Red" Shannon (February 11, 1897 – April 12, 1970) was an American infielder for the Boston Braves (1915), Philadelphia Athletics (1917–1919 and 1920–21), Boston Red Sox (1919), Washington Senators (1920) and Chicago Cubs (1926).

Over the course of seven seasons, he played in 310 games, drove in 91 runs, stole 21 bases, hit 0 home runs, and had a slash line of .259/.334/.336. His 22 career triples are the most for a player without a home run.

He was the twin brother of Joe Shannon, and the two played on the Braves during the 1915 season. He died in his hometown at the age of 73.

== Sources ==
- Career statistics from Baseball Reference · Baseball Reference (Minors) · Retrosheet · Baseball Almanac
