= Ossie Vitt =

American baseball player and manager (1890–1963)

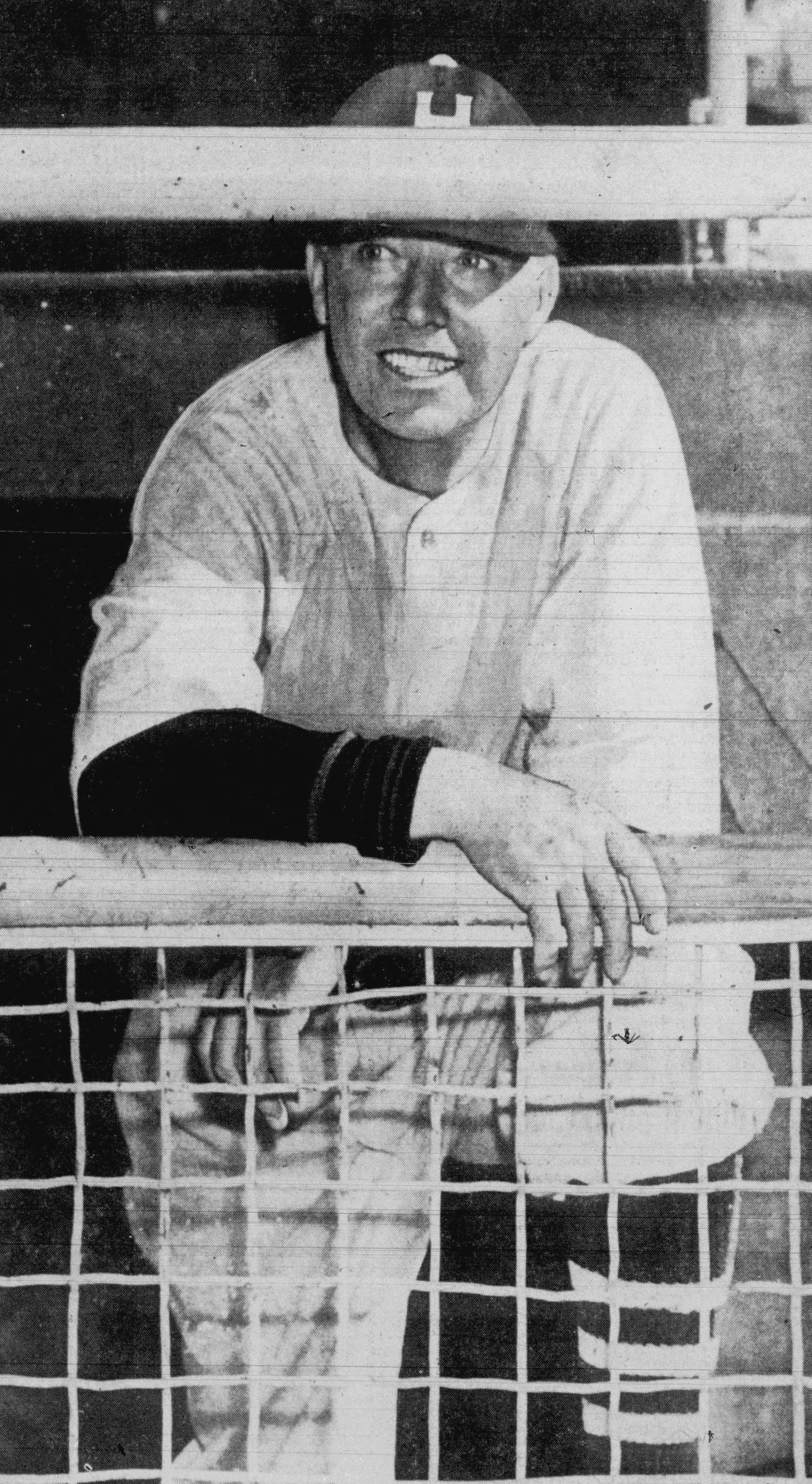
- Vitt, circa 1942
- Third baseman / Manager
- Born: January 4, 1890; San Francisco, California, U.S.
- Died: January 31, 1963 (aged 73); Oakland, California, U.S.
- Batted: Right Threw: Right

MLB debut
- April 11, 1912, for the Detroit Tigers

Last MLB appearance
- October 1, 1921, for the Boston Red Sox

MLB statistics
- Batting average: .238
- Home runs: 4
- Runs batted in: 298
- Managerial record: 262–198
- Winning %: .570
- Stats at Baseball Reference
- Managerial record at Baseball Reference

Teams
- As a player: Detroit Tigers (1912–1918); Boston Red Sox (1919–1921); As a manager: Cleveland Indians (1938–1940)

Oscar Joseph "Ossie" Vitt (January 4, 1890 – January 31, 1963) was an American Major League Baseball third baseman and manager in the American League for the Detroit Tigers (1912–1918) and Boston Red Sox (1919–1921). Vitt later became manager of the Cleveland Indians (1938–1940), where he sometimes clashed with his players.

== Playing career ==
Ossie Vitt was a product of the sandlots of San Francisco. He broke into the Pacific Coast League as third baseman for the San Francisco Seals in 1911. He later advanced to the majors as a utility infielder for the Detroit Tigers. Through his major league career, Vitt played 833 games at 3rd base and 161 games at 2nd base. As the Tigers' regular third baseman from 1915 through 1917, he never batted higher than .254. But he was described as a smart, scrappy baseball man.

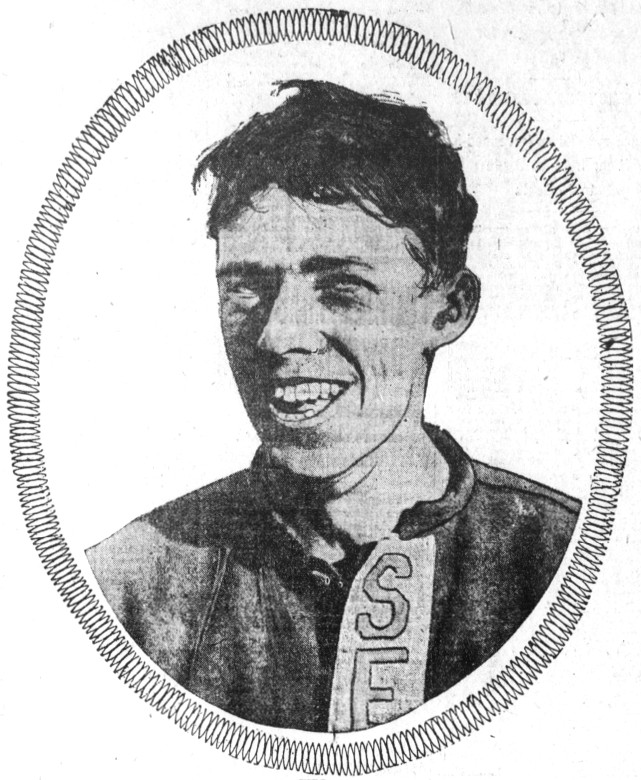
Vitt in 1910

Vitt had a career batting average of .238, and was a talented third baseman with range and a good throwing arm. His .960 fielding average in 10 years at 3rd base was 20 points higher than the Major League average for 3rd basemen of his era. He led all American League third basemen in consecutive years (1915 and 1916) in putouts, assists and fielding percentage. He had career highs at third base of 208 putouts (team record at 3B), 385 assists, and 32 double plays in 1916. His range factor of 3.93 in 1916 was 70 points higher than the league average for third basemen.

While not known for a high batting average, Vitt was regarded as a strong contact hitter and one of the premier bunters of his era, a skill set that complemented a Detroit lineup featuring Ty Cobb, Sam Crawford, and Bobby Veach. Over the course of his career, he recorded 259 sacrifice hits, a total that ranks among the top 35 in Major League Baseball history despite the relatively limited length of his playing tenure.

Vitt was also one of the toughest players to strike out in MLB history. For his career, he struck out an average of once every 26.6 at bats, 35th best in MLB history. In 1918, his at bat per strikeout ratio was 44.5, 2nd best in the AL.

On August 10, 1915, Vitt was hit in the head by a Walter Johnson fastball. After being knocked unconscious for five minutes‚ Vitt left the game with a concussion. Ty Cobb‚ observing Johnson's fear of hitting a batter‚ crowded the plate on Johnson from that point forward. Cobb hit .435 against Johnson after the Vitt incident.

On July 30, 1917, Cobb‚ Veach‚ and Vitt followed each other in the lineup‚ with each going 5-for-5.

On January 17, 1919, Vitt was traded by the Tigers to the Boston Red Sox for Eddie Ainsmith, Chick Shorten, and Slim Love.

== Managerial Career and the "Cleveland Crybabies" ==
After playing in the majors for 10 years, Vitt was recommended to Oakland Oaks' owner Victor Devincinzi by the Yankees' management to manage the Oaks in 1935. His style was described as both abrasive and motivational, pushing the Oaks to a third-place finish.

Vitt moved on in the Yankees' organization the next year, managing their farm team in Newark. He was then hired by the Cleveland Indians in 1938 to replace Steve O'Neill as manager and instill new life into their team.

Vitt's role in the 1940 Cleveland Indians team known as the "Cleveland Crybabies" has become a baseball legend. "I don't want any lazy players on my club," said Vitt when he was hired. "If the boys won't hustle, out they go." Vitt's players felt they were being accused. In Vitt's first two seasons in Cleveland, the Indians finished third. Yet, there were frequent clashes between Vitt and his players, and the discontent festered.

On June 11, 1940, matters came to a head when he went to the mound to remove Mel Harder. "When are you going to start earning your salary?" asked Vitt of Harder, who had won at least 15 games for eight consecutive seasons, including two 20-win seasons. The team revolted, and many players signed a petition to have Vitt removed. After the incident with Harder, a dozen Indians met with owner Alva Bradley to state their grievances against Vitt, whom they described as a "wild man." They made it clear they hoped he would be fired. In the closed-door meeting between Indians players and owner, Harder told Bradley: "We think we have a good chance to win the pennant, but we'll never win it with Vitt as manager. If we can get rid of him, we can win. We feel sure about that." Bradley sought to keep the controversy quiet, but the story quickly got out, and newspaper headlines all over the nation referred gleefully to the Indians as the "Cleveland Crybabies."

Despite the hullabaloo and ridicule, the Indians, with Vitt hanging on to his job, battled the Detroit Tigers for the pennant to the last day of the 1940 season. Through June, the Indians were 42–25. After June, with the "Crybabies" harangue clanging in the papers and from the stands, they went 47–40, not a collapse, but not good enough to stay ahead of the Tigers who won the pennant by a single game over the Tribe. Bob Feller, a 27-game winner that year, lost the decisive game 2–0.

=== Managerial record ===
Team	Year	Regular season					Postseason			
Team	Year	Games	Won	Lost	Win %	Finish	Won	Lost	Win %	Result
CLE	1938	152	86	66	.566	3rd in AL	–	–	–	–
CLE	1939	154	87	67	.565	3rd in AL	–	–	–	–
CLE	1940	154	89	65	.578	2nd in AL	–	–	–	–
Total		460	262	198	.570		0	0	–	

== PCL Hall of Fame ==
Vitt was among those in the first class of inductees in 1943 in the Pacific Coast League Hall of Fame.
