= Grover Lowdermilk =

American baseball player (1885–1968)

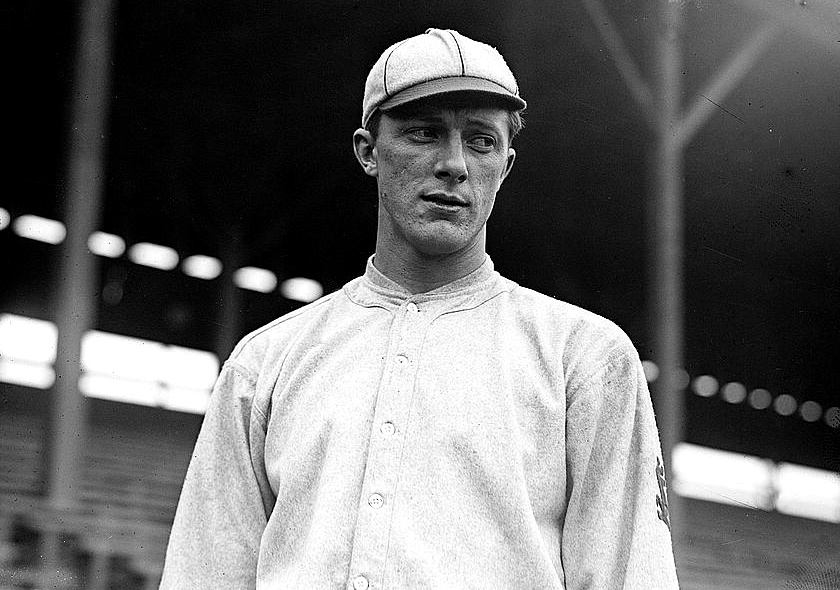
- Pitcher
- Born: January 15, 1885; Sandborn, Indiana, U.S.
- Died: March 31, 1968 (aged 83); Odin, Illinois, U.S.
- Batted: Right Threw: Right

MLB debut
- July 3, 1909, for the St. Louis Cardinals

Last MLB appearance
- May 12, 1920, for the Chicago White Sox

MLB statistics
- Win–loss record: 23–39
- Earned run average: 3.58
- Strikeouts: 296
- Stats at Baseball Reference

Teams
- St. Louis Cardinals (1909, 1911); Chicago Cubs (1912); St. Louis Browns (1915); Detroit Tigers (1915–1916); Cleveland Indians (1916); St. Louis Browns (1917–1919); Chicago White Sox (1919–1920)

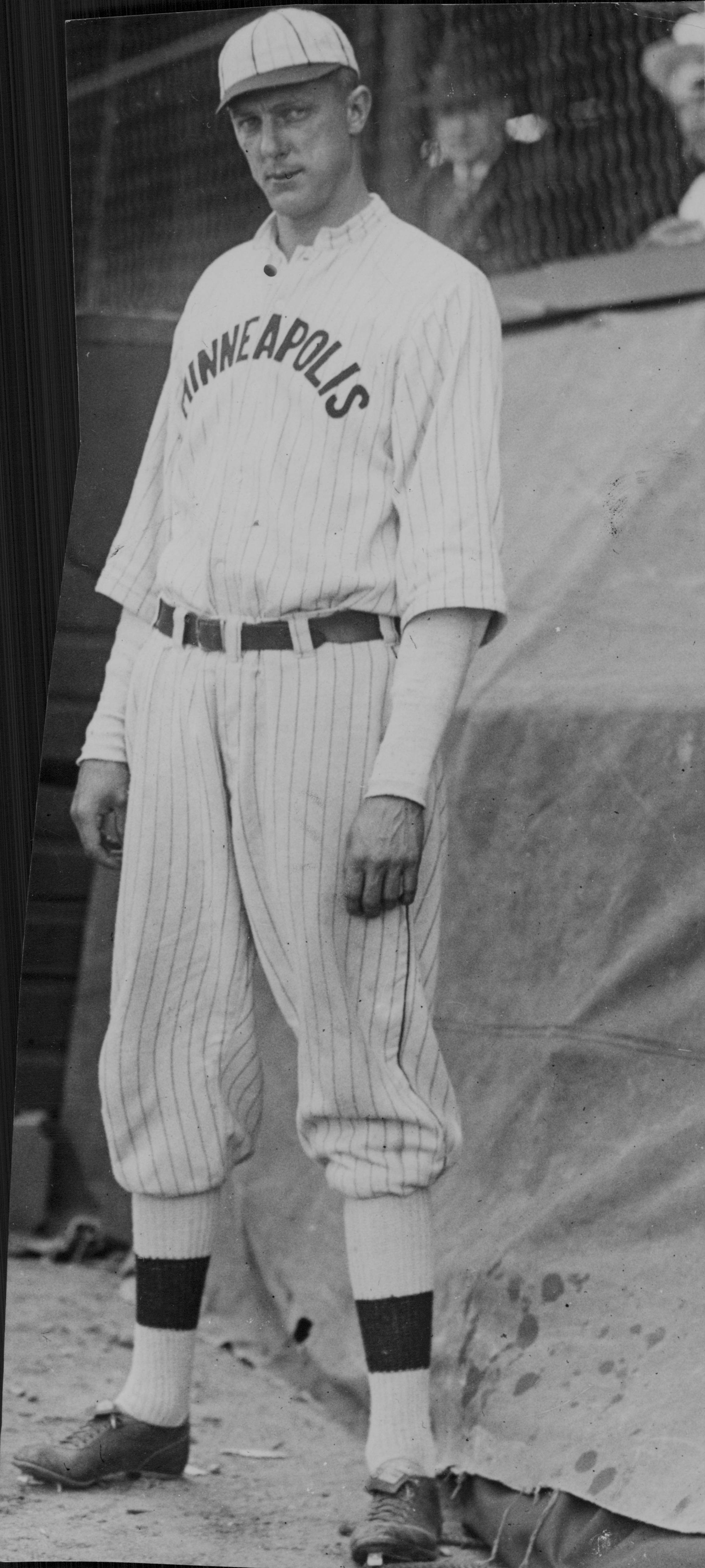
Grover Lowdermilk with the minor league Minneapolis Millers, 1920s

Grover Cleveland "Slim" Lowdermilk (January 15, 1885 – March 31, 1968) was an American Major League Baseball pitcher with the St. Louis Cardinals, Chicago Cubs, St. Louis Browns, Detroit Tigers, Cleveland Indians and Chicago White Sox between 1909 and 1920. Lowdermilk batted and threw right-handed. He was born in Sandborn, Indiana.
