= Bill James (pitcher, born 1887) =

American baseball player (1887–1942)

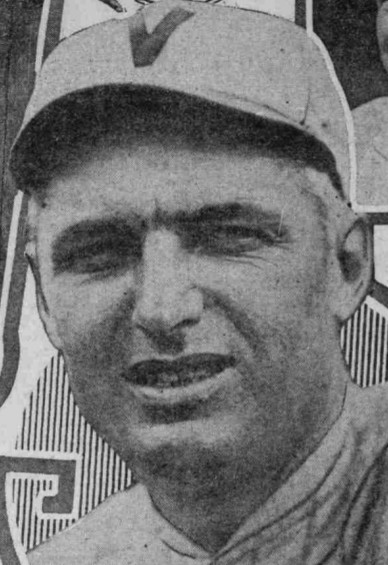
- Pitcher
- Born: January 20, 1887; Detroit, Michigan, U.S.
- Died: May 25, 1942 (aged 55); Venice, California, U.S.
- Batted: Both Threw: Right

MLB debut
- June 12, 1911, for the Cleveland Naps

Last MLB appearance
- September 17, 1919, for the Chicago White Sox

MLB statistics
- Win–loss record: 64–71
- Earned run average: 3.20
- Strikeouts: 408
- Stats at Baseball Reference

Teams
- Cleveland Naps (1911–1912); St. Louis Browns (1914–1915); Detroit Tigers (1915–1919); Boston Red Sox (1919); Chicago White Sox (1919)

William Henry "Big Bill" James (January 20, 1887 – May 25, 1942) was an American professional baseball pitcher. He played all or part of eight seasons in Major League Baseball between 1911 and 1919. Primarily used as a starting pitcher, he played for the Cleveland Naps (1911–1912), St. Louis Browns (1914–1915), Detroit Tigers (1915–1919), Boston Red Sox (1919) and Chicago White Sox (1919). James was a switch hitter and threw right-handed. He was born in Detroit, Michigan.

In an eight-season career, Big Bill posted a 65–71 record with 408 strikeouts and a 3.20 ERA in 1179.2 innings pitched. In 1917, Chick Gandil and his teammate, Swede Risberg, allegedly collected $45 from each member of the White Sox and paid off the Detroit Tigers in two crucial doubleheaders late in the season. When Big Bill agreed that his team would go easy, the Tigers lost all four games, allowing the White Sox to win the American League pennant. He was one of the clean members on the 1919 Chicago White Sox team which was made famous by the Black Sox scandal. Even so, Big Bill gave up 8 hits, 3 walks, and 3 earned runs for a 5.79 ERA in 4 2/3 innings pitched in the 1919 World Series.

Big Bill died in Venice, California, at age of 55.

== Best seasons ==
- 1914: 15 wins, 109 SO, 2.85 ERA, 20 complete games, three shutouts, 284 innings.
- 1917: 13 wins, career-bests with 2.09 ERA (7th best in AL), 126 Adjusted ERA+ (8th in AL), 7.41 hits allowed per 9 innings pitched (8th in AL), and 12 batters hit by pitch (3rd in AL).
