= 1919 in baseball =

The following are the baseball events of the year 1919 throughout the world.

== Headline Event of the Year ==
Chicago White Sox players accused of throwing World Series, resulting in the Black Sox Scandal.

== Champions ==
- World Series: Cincinnati Reds over Chicago White Sox (5–3)

Other champions

- Inter-Allied Games: United States (3–1)

== Statistical leaders ==
	American League		National League	
Stat	Player	Total	Player	Total
AVG	Ty Cobb (DET)	.384	Edd Roush (CIN)	.321
HR	Babe Ruth (BOS)	29	Gavvy Cravath (PHI)	12
RBI	Babe Ruth (BOS)	114	Hy Myers (BRO)	73
W	Eddie Cicotte (CWS)	29	Jesse Barnes (NYG)	25
ERA	Walter Johnson (WSH)	1.49	Grover Alexander (CHC)	1.72
K	Walter Johnson (WSH)	147	Hippo Vaughn (CHC)	141

== Major league baseball final standings ==
=== American League final standings ===
American League
Team	W	L	Pct.	GB	Home	Road
Chicago White Sox	88	52	.629	—	48‍–‍22	40‍–‍30
Cleveland Indians	84	55	.604	3½	44‍–‍25	40‍–‍30
New York Yankees	80	59	.576	7½	46‍–‍25	34‍–‍34
Detroit Tigers	80	60	.571	8	46‍–‍24	34‍–‍36
St. Louis Browns	67	72	.482	20½	40‍–‍30	27‍–‍42
Boston Red Sox	66	71	.482	20½	35‍–‍30	31‍–‍41
Washington Senators	56	84	.400	32	32‍–‍40	24‍–‍44
Philadelphia Athletics	36	104	.257	52	21‍–‍49	15‍–‍55

Locations of teams for the 1915–1922 American League seasons
American League

=== National League final standings ===
National League
Team	W	L	Pct.	GB	Home	Road
Cincinnati Reds	96	44	.686	—	51‍–‍19	45‍–‍25
New York Giants	87	53	.621	9	46‍–‍23	41‍–‍30
Chicago Cubs	75	65	.536	21	40‍–‍31	35‍–‍34
Pittsburgh Pirates	71	68	.511	24½	39‍–‍31	32‍–‍37
Brooklyn Robins	69	71	.493	27	36‍–‍34	33‍–‍37
Boston Braves	57	82	.410	38½	29‍–‍38	28‍–‍44
St. Louis Cardinals	54	83	.394	40½	34‍–‍35	20‍–‍48
Philadelphia Phillies	47	90	.343	47½	26‍–‍44	21‍–‍46

Locations of teams for the 1916–1919 National League seasons
National League

== Events ==
=== January ===
- January 26 – After the city of Pasadena, California passed an ordinance requiring all people to wear masks in public due to the Spanish flu pandemic, a California Winter League game took place between the Pasadena and La Habra teams in which all players and umpires wore masks.
- January 30 – The Cincinnati Reds hire Pat Moran as manager when no word is received from manager Christy Mathewson, who is still in France.
- January 31 – Future Hall of Fame member Jackie Robinson is born to Jerry and Mallie Robinson in Cairo, Georgia. Robinson will become the first African American player in 20th century major league history when he debuts for the Brooklyn Dodgers in 1947.

=== February ===
- February 1 – After winning an out-of-court settlement of his suit against the Brooklyn Robins for the balance of his salary ($2,150) when the 1918 season ended a month early, former MVP Jake Daubert is traded to the Reds for OF Tommy Griffith.
- February 5 – Charges brought in 1918 by Reds owner Garry Herrmann and manager Christy Mathewson against Hal Chase for betting against his team and throwing games in collusion with gamblers are dismissed by National League president John Heydler.
- February 19 – The Reds trade Chase to the New York Giants in exchange for first baseman Walter Holke and catcher Bill Rariden.
- February 21 – The New York Yankees acquire 35-year-old spitballer Jack Quinn from Vernon (PCL), sending in exchange P Happy Finneran, 1B Zinn Beck, and cash. Quinn will be named a designated spitballer when the wet pitch is outlawed, and in 1921 he will help the Yankees to their first American League pennant. Quinn won't call it quits until he's 50.
- February 28 – The St. Louis Browns purchase the contract of catcher Wally Mayer from the Boston Red Sox for the sum of $5,000.

=== March ===
- March 1 – Philadelphia Athletics owner Connie Mack makes one of his biggest player mistakes, trading 3B Larry Gardner, OF Charlie Jamieson, and P Elmer Myers to Cleveland in exchange for OF Braggo Roth. Vet writer Ernest Lanigan predicts that Roth will lead the circuit in homers at Shibe Park, but Roth will be shipped on to Boston by midseason. Gardner will put in six more .300 years, and Jamieson will be a top leadoff man and .303 hitter for the next 14 years.
- March 7 – Christy Mathewson, back from World War I, rejoins the Giants as pitching coach and heir apparent to John McGraw.
- March 17 – The Boston Red Sox, minus holdouts Carl Mays and Babe Ruth, sail from New York aboard the S.S. Arapahoe. The trip to spring training is stormy and most of the players will be seasick.

=== April ===
- April 18 – The Brooklyn Robins purchase the contract of outfielder Lee Magee from the Cincinnati Reds. Magee would later be a key figure in Hal Chase's banishment from baseball when Magee confided to National League president John Heydler that Chase tried to bribe him to not hustle in a game.
- April 19 – Legislation is passed by future New York City mayor Jimmy Walker that allows teams in the state of New York to play baseball on Sundays. The New York Giants were the first team to take advantage of this change, losing 4–3 to the Philadelphia Phillies in front of 35,000 fans at the Polo Ground.
- April 25 – Dickey Kerr makes his major league debut for the Chicago White Sox. He relieved starter Dave Danforth and pitched seven innings in a 7–2 loss to the St. Louis Browns. Kerr did not figure in the decision.

=== May ===
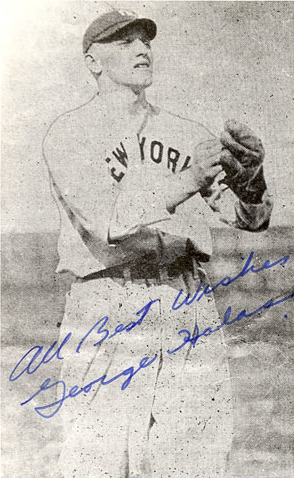
George Halas during his brief and unsuccessful tenure as a professional baseball player for the New York Yankees

- May 4 – The New York Giants play their first legal Sunday game at home, before 35,000 fans, losing to the Philadelphia Phillies, 4–3. More than 25,000 turn out in Brooklyn the same day. By early June, the Giants will outdraw their 1918 attendance.
- May 6 – A 24 year old outfielder named George Halas makes his MLB debut for the New York Yankees. He goes one for four in a game against the Philadelphia Athletics. This would be the only season Halas plays in the majors before he became one of the founders of the National Football League.
- May 11:
  - Cincinnati Reds right-hander Hod Eller pitches a 6–0 no-hitter against the St. Louis Cardinals.
  - Walter Johnson retires 28 consecutive batters during a 12-inning scoreless tie against Jack Quinn and the New York Yankees. Future football immortal George Halas, batting leadoff for New York, goes 0-for-5 with two strikeouts.
- May 15 – The Cincinnati Reds bomb Al Mamaux for 10 runs in the 13th innings to beat the Brooklyn Robins, 10–0. Reds RF Greassy Neale has a record 10 putouts.
- May 20 – Red Sox pitcher Babe Ruth hit his first career grand slam home run; the bomb comes against Dave Davenport of the St. Louis Browns in St. Louis. Boston wins 6–4.
- May 21 – The Giants send Jim Thorpe to Boston for the $1,500 waiver price.
- May 23 – It's Hank Gowdy Day in Boston, the catcher's first game after returning from the Army. He hits the first pitch he sees for a single.

=== June ===
- June 14 – Chicago White Sox ace Eddie Cicotte beats the Philadelphia Athletics for the 12th straight time en route to a 29–7 record and a 1.82 ERA.
  - The New York Giants sign free agent infielder Frankie Frisch. Without spending a day in the minor leagues, Frisch, who'd just graduated from Fordham, makes his MLB three days later versus Chicago.
- June 23:
  - Boston Red Sox 1B Stuffy McInnis makes his first error of the year after handling 526 chances.
  - Chicago White Sox CF Happy Felsch handles a record-tying 12 chances in a nine-inning game. Only Harry Bay of Cleveland in 1904 has been so busy.

=== July ===
- July 1 – Going 5-for-5 in a 9–4 win over the Phillies, Brooklyn's Ed Konetchy gets his 10th straight hit, tying Jake Gettman's record set with Washington in 1897. Both will be topped by Walt Dropo in 1952.
- July 6 – William Veeck, former sportswriter, replaces Fred Mitchell as Chicago Cubs president, but Mitchell remains as manager for the team.
- July 8 – Jack Coombs resigns as manager of the last-place Philadelphia Phillies. Slugger Gavvy Cravath replaces him.
- July 29 – The New York Yankees trade pitchers Bob McGraw and Allen Russell to the Boston Red Sox for a player to be named later. The trade is completed the next day when the Red Sox ship pitcher Carl Mays to the Yankees.

=== August ===
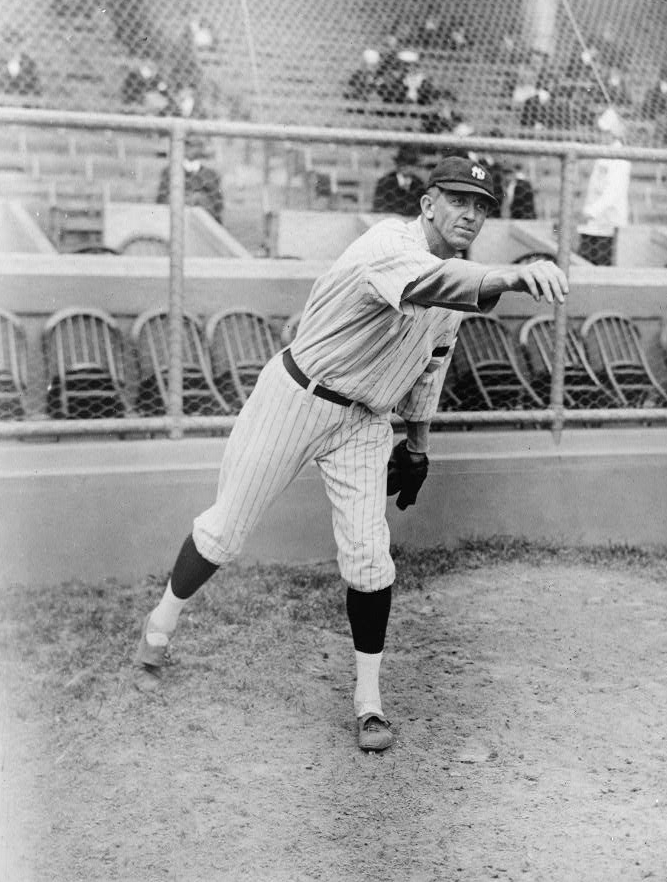
Pictured is Ray Caldwell before his move from the Yankees to the Indians, whose eventful 1919 season included throwing a no-hitter and being struck by lightning during the 9th inning of a game.

- August 2 – Fred Luderus, a first baseman for the Philadelphia Phillies, breaks Eddie Collins' record for most consecutive games played. Luderus plays in his 479th straight game. The streak eventually comes to an end in the opening game for the 1920 season.
- August 8 – The Pittsburgh Pirates trade Casey Stengel to the Phillies for Possum Whitted, who will bat .389 for Pittsburgh in the last 35 games of the season.
- August 11 – Cleveland Indians center fielder Tris Speaker ties the AL record for run scoring, crossing the plate five times in 15–9 win at New York.
- August 14:
  - Babe Ruth hits his 17th home run, the first of seven homers in 12 days, which will include his fourth grand slam, setting an AL record until 1961, when it would be broken by Jim Gentile of the Baltimore Orioles. The Yankees overcome Muddy Ruel's hitting into a triple play and beat the Tigers in 15 innings, 5–4.
  - Chicago White Sox CF Happy Felsch ties the major-league record with four OF assists in one game, but the Boston Red Sox beats Chicago 15–6.
  - The Brooklyn Robins waste no time in splitting a pair with the Chicago Cubs, losing 2–0 in an hour and 10 minutes, then winning 1–0 in one hour and seven minutes in the second game.
- August 16 – The St. Louis Browns set an AL record with 53 total chances against the Philadelphia Athletics, but lose 7–4. The Browns have 26 assists and St. Louis 1B George Sisler has 17 putouts. With no putouts, the St. Louis outfielders have the day off.
- August 20:
  - Wichita OF Joe Wilhoit (Western League) fails to get a hit, ending a 69-game streak in which he collected 155 hits in 299 at bats for a .505 batting average. The previous record was 49 by Oakland's Jack Ness (Pacific Coast League) in 1915.
  - The New York Yankees purchase the contracts of outfielder Bob Meusel from Vernon of the PCL, and pitcher Rip Collins from Dallas in the Texas League. Both players would play key roles in the Yankees' 1921 AL Pennant team.
- August 24 – Cleveland Indians pitcher Ray Caldwell is hit by lightning during the ninth inning of his debut for the tribe. He quickly recovered, reportedly saying "Give me that danged ball and turn me toward the plate", before pitching the final out of the game.
- August 26 – New York Giants 1B Hal Chase handles 35 chances against the Pittsburgh Pirates during a doubleheader.
- August 28 – Bucky Harris makes his MLB debut for the Washington Senators, playing second base. Harris would eventually make the hall of fame as a manager.

=== September ===
- September 2 – The National Commission recommends a best-of-nine World Series games. The lengthier World Series is seen as a sign of greed and is abandoned after three years, reverting to the seven-game format and has remained ever since.
- September 8 – Babe Ruth hits his 26th home run off Jack Quinn at the Polo Grounds, breaking the 25-HR record set by Buck Freeman in 1899.
- September 10 – Cleveland Indians' pitcher Ray Caldwell, struck by lightning 2 weeks earlier, no-hits his former teammates New York Yankees 3–0 at the Polo Grounds.
- September 16 – Dutch Ruether beats the New York Giants, 4–3, to clinch the Cincinnati Reds first NL pennant and their first pennant of any kind since 1882 during their American Association days.
- September 20 – Babe Ruth ties Ned Williamson's major-league home run mark of 27 with a game-winner off Lefty Williams of the Chicago White Sox. Four days later, Ruth will hit his 28 over the roof of the Polo Grounds.
- September 21 – In a period of rapidly played games, the Cubs beat the Braves 3–0 in 58 minutes of playing time. It takes the Robins 55 minutes to beat the Reds 3–1, with Slim Sallee throwing 65 pitches, managing to top Christy Mathewson's 69-pitch complete game.
- September 24:
  - The Chicago White Sox's 6–5 win over the St. Louis Browns clinches the AL pennant; the final margin will be 3½ games over the Cleveland Indians.
  - The Brooklyn Robins defeat the Phillies twice on Fred Luderus Day in Philadelphia. The second game is the 525th in a row played by the Phillies first baseman, who is presented with a diamond stickpin and gold watch between the games to commemorate his endurance effort. He will end the season with a consecutive-game streak of 553.
  - Boston Red Sox pitcher Waite Hoyt throws nine perfect innings against the New York Yankees, but they score in the 13th in which he gives up 5 hits, ruining his perfect game, and losing the game 2–1.
- September 27 – Babe Ruth hit his 29th home run and his first of the year in Washington, to become the first player to hit at least one home run in every AL park in the same season.
- September 28 – On the last day of the season, Jesse Barnes won his National League-leading 25th victory, 6–1, over Lee Meadows and the Philadelphia Phillies at Polo Grounds. The game was played at a feverish pace and lasted a mere 51 minutes, a major league record that still stands as the shortest nine-inning game ever played.

=== October ===
- October 1 – Just before the start of the World Series, the highly favored Chicago White Sox became the betting underdogs. A year later the White Sox will become the Black Sox, and eight of them: pitchers Eddie Cicotte and Lefty Williams, outfielders Shoeless Joe Jackson and Happy Felsch, 1B Chick Gandil, SS Swede Risberg, 3B Buck Weaver, and utility infielder Fred McMullin, will be barred from baseball for taking part in throwing the Series. It will take that long for the story to unfold, as most observers at the time see nothing amiss when the Series opens in Cincinnati.
- October 9 – The Cincinnati Reds defeat the Chicago White Sox, 10–5, in Game 8 of the World Series to win their first World Championship, five games to three. The events of the series are often associated with the Black Sox Scandal, when several members of the Chicago franchise conspired with gamblers to throw World Series games. The 1919 World Series was the last World Series to take place without a Commissioner of Baseball in place. In 1920, the various franchise owners installed Kenesaw Mountain Landis as the first "Commissioner of Baseball".

=== November ===
- November 10 – Clark Griffith becomes a club owner and president when he joins Philadelphia grain broker William Richardson in buying controlling interest in the Washington Senators for $175,000. Griffith, unable to get financial help from the American League, mortgages his Montana ranch to raise funds.

=== December ===
- December 10:
  - The National League votes to ban the spitball's use by all new pitchers. The ban will be formally worked out by the Rules Committee in February.
  - With the opposition led by New York, Boston, and Chicago owners, the American League directors pass a resolution accusing Ban Johnson of overstepping his duties. They demand that league files be turned over to them and that an auditor review all financial accounts.
- December 26 – Although it will not be officially announced until January, the New York Yankees buy Babe Ruth from financially pressed Harry Frazee, paying $125,000 (one-fourth cash, plus $25,000 a year at six percent) plus guaranteeing a $300,000 loan with Fenway Park as collateral.
- December 29 – The Boston Red Sox send OF Braggo Roth and 2B Red Shannon to the Washington Senators in exchange for P Harry Harper, OF Mike Menosky and 3B Eddie Foster.

== Births ==
=== January ===
- January 1 – Sherry Robertson
- January 2 – Bill Harman
- January 3 – Ed Sauer
- January 8 – Don White
- January 9 – Charlie Sproull
- January 11 – Lou Rochelli
- January 13 – Ben Guintini
- January 22 – Diomedes Olivo
- January 29 – Hank Edwards
- January 29 – Bill Voiselle
- January 31 – Ken Gables
- January 31 – Jackie Robinson

=== February ===
- February 1 – Norm Brown
- February 5 – Cy Buker
- February 5 – Bill Burgo
- February 7 – Stan Galle
- February 13 – Bobby Rhawn
- February 15 – Ducky Detweiler
- February 22 – Johnny Lucadello
- February 24 – Del Wilber
- February 25 – Monte Irvin

=== March ===
- March 3 – Bud Souchock
- March 4 – Les Mueller
- March 5 – Don Savage
- March 7 – Junior Walsh
- March 15 – Ray Noble
- March 15 – Whitey Wietelmann
- March 16 – Tom Gorman
- March 17 – Pete Reiser
- March 18 – Mickey Rutner
- March 18 – Hal White
- March 25 – Bill Evans
- March 28 – Vic Raschi
- March 30 – Bud Sketchley

=== April ===
- April 2 – Earl Johnson
- April 3 – Larry Shepard
- April 11 – Hank Schenz
- April 18 – Bob Ferguson
- April 20 – Earl Harrist
- April 21 – Stan Rojek
- April 28 – Charlie Metro

=== May ===
- May 1 – Al Zarilla
- May 4 – Cy Block
- May 9 – Carl Lindquist
- May 11 – Porter Vaughan
- May 13 – Bill Kinnamon
- May 15 – Ed Wright
- May 16 – Stubby Overmire
- May 16 – Lefty Phillips
- May 19 – Earl Naylor
- May 20 – Harry Taylor
- May 24 – Jack Phillips
- May 28 – Art Lopatka
- May 28 – Steve Nagy
- May 29 – Al Brancato

=== June ===
- June 8 – Dee Phillips
- June 8 – Charley Schanz
- June 11 – Earl Jones
- June 20 – Bill Clemensen

=== July ===
- July 6 – Hardin Cathey
- July 7 – Hugh East
- July 8 – Charlie Gilbert
- July 9 – Lillian Luckey
- July 10 – Dain Clay
- July 10 – Daisy Junor
- July 12 – Johnny Wyrostek
- July 14 – Crash Davis
- July 16 – Art Johnson
- July 16 – Tommy Tatum
- July 17 – Hal Erickson
- July 23 – Strick Shofner

=== August ===
- August 4 – Lillian Jackson
- August 5 – Buddy Gremp
- August 6 – Leon Culberson
- August 6 – Bobby Sturgeon
- August 9 – Ralph Houk
- August 9 – Fred Sanford
- August 11 – Luis Rodríguez Olmo
- August 12 – Fred Hutchinson
- August 15 – Ted Pawelek
- August 16 – Alcibíades Colón
- August 17 – Clem Hausmann
- August 17 – Ernie Nevel
- August 21 – Dalmiro Finol, Venezuelan baseball player (d. 1994)
- August 22 – Ed Freed
- August 22 – Hank LaManna
- August 28 – Chip Marshall
- August 29 – Billy Cox
- August 29 – Orval Grove
- August 31 – Jack Wallaesa

=== September ===
- September 1 – Gladys Davis
- September 1 – Jim Hopper
- September 4 – Eddie Waitkus
- September 5 – Ray Goolsby
- September 5 – Tom Jordan
- September 8 – Jimmie Armstead
- September 11 – Barney Olsen
- September 15 – Mike Budnick
- September 16 – Bruce Konopka
- September 16 – Penny O'Brian
- September 27 – Bill Ayers
- September 27 – Johnny Pesky
- September 29 – Slim Emmerich

=== October ===
- October 1 – Bob Boyd
- October 1 – Barney Mussill
- October 2 – Joe Buzas
- October 3 – Joe Wood
- October 7 – Tommy Hughes
- October 8 – Bob Gillespie
- October 16 – Ed Bahr
- October 17 – Charlie Cozart
- October 17 – Howie Moss
- October 18 – Lee Pfund
- October 19 – Jack Niemes
- October 20 – Jack Franklin
- October 26 – Jack Cassini
- October 27 – Don Richmond

=== November ===
- November 2 – Bill Mills
- November 3 – Spider Jorgensen
- November 6 – Frank Carswell
- November 7 – Tommy Neill
- November 9 – Jerry Priddy
- November 10 – Harry Feldman
- November 11 – Glenn Elliott
- November 15 – Bill Burgo
- November 17 – Ray Lamanno
- November 20 – Rugger Ardizoia
- November 24 – Napoleón Reyes
- November 26 – Danny Reynolds

=== December ===
- December 1 – Pete Wojey
- December 3 – Hooks Iott
- December 3 – James Tillman
- December 5 – Baby Ortiz
- December 10 – Irene Kotowicz
- December 10 – Andy Tomasic
- December 11 – Merl Combs
- December 15 – Ken Trinkle
- December 17 – Johnny Kucab
- December 26 – Gene Markland
- December 30 – Pete Layden
- December 31 – Tommy Byrne
- December 31 – Loyd Christopher

== Deaths ==
=== January–February ===
- January 1 – Gene Curtis, 35, outfielder for the 1903 Pittsburgh Pirates.
- January 3 – Al Schellhase, 54, outfielder for the 1890 Boston Beaneaters (NL) and the 1891 Louisville Colonels (AA).
- January 3 – Art Rico, 23, Italian-born catcher who played from 1916 through 1917 for the Boston Braves of the National League.
- January 6 – Jake Stenzel, 51, National League center fielder for four different clubs between 1890 and 1899, a five-time .300 hitter whose career batting average of .339 is the 12th highest in Major League history.
- January 8 – Jim O'Rourke, 68, left fielder for Boston, Buffalo and New York who batted .314 lifetime and ended his career ranked second all-time in games, hits, runs, doubles and total bases; made first hit in major league history after four seasons in National Association, and later became oldest player ever to get a hit at age 54; led NL in hits, runs, home runs, triples and walks once each; later a minor league manager and executive.
- January 23 – John Newell, 51, third baseman who played for the Pittsburgh Pirates during the 1891 season.
- February 4 – Lefty Davis, 44, outfielder who hit .261 in 348 games with the Pirates, Highlanders, Reds and Superbas between 1901 and 1907.

=== March–April ===
- March 1 – Bill Fouser, 63, second baseman for the 1876 Philadelphia Athletics.
- March 1 – Hal McClure, 59, outfielder for the 1882 Boston Red Caps of the National League.
- March 5 – Bill Yawkey, 44, owner of the Detroit Tigers from 1903 until his death, victim of the 1918 flu pandemic; his nephew Tom owned the Boston Red Sox from 1933 until his July 1976 death.
- March 6 – Fred Demarais, 52, Canadian pitcher for the 1890 Chicago Colts of the National League.
- March 7 – Phil Auten, 79, co-owner of the Pittsburgh Pirates from 1893 to 1900.
- March 13 – Jim Toy, 60, played two seasons, 1887 & 1890, sometimes credited at the first Native American to play in the Majors.
- March 30 – John Bates, 50, pitcher for the 1889 Kansas City Cowboys of the American Association.
- March 28 – Steve Toole, 59, pitcher for the Kansas City Cowboys and the Brooklyn Grays/Gladiators teams between 1886 and 1890.
- April 25 – Bill Higgins, 59, second baseman who played with the Boston Beaneaters of the National League (1888) and the St. Louis Browns and Syracuse Stars of the American Association (1890).
- April 28 – Bill Ahearn, 61, catcher who played in one game for the Troy Trojans of the National League in 1880.

=== May–June ===
- May 16 – Germany Schaefer, 42, second baseman who forced a rule change after stealing first base in reverse direction during a 1908 game while with the Tigers.
- May 26 – Sadie Houck, 63, shortstop who played eight seasons from 1879 to 1887.
- May 28 – Jack Wanner, 33, shortstop for the 1909 New York Highlanders of the American League.
- June 5 – John McCloskey, 36, pitcher who played from 1906 to 1907 for the Philadelphia Phillies.
- June 15 – Fred Tenney, 59, Union Association outfielder who played for the Washington Nationals, Boston Reds and Wilmington Quicksteps in the 1884 baseball season.
- June 20 – William Stephen Devery, 65, former New York City police commissioner who, with Frank J. Farrell, bought the original Baltimore Orioles of the American League in 1902, moved them to New York as the Highlanders in 1903, and sold them (as the New York Yankees) to Jacob Ruppert and Tillinghast L'Hommedieu Huston in 1915.
- June 22 – Joe Woerlin, 54, French shortstop who played in one game for the 1895 Washington Senators of the National League.
- June 27 – Larry Schlafly, 40, second baseman and manager for the Buffalo Buffeds/Blues of the Federal League.

=== July–August ===
- July 9 – Aleck Smith, 35, backup catcher for four different teams during nine seasons, and a member of the 1903 American League champions Boston Americans.
- July 24 – Ed Bagley, 55, pitcher for the 1884 New York Gothams and the 1885 New York Metropolitans.
- August 11 – Frank Todd, 49, pitcher for the 1898 Louisville Colonels of the American Association.
- August 16 – Ed McKean, 55, shortstop for the Cleveland Spiders who batted .302 lifetime and had four seasons of 100 runs and 100 RBI; among first ten players to reach 2000 hits.
- August 21 – Bob Clark, 56, catcher for the Brooklyn Grays/Bridegrooms, Cincinnati Reds and Louisville Colonels between 1886 and 1893.

=== September–October ===
- September 8 – John Kerins, 52, first baseman/catcher and two-time manager from 1884 to 1890. Led the American Association in triples with 19 in 1887.
- September 20 – Cy Seymour, 46, center fielder for the Giants and Reds who batted .303 lifetime; led NL in batting, doubles, triples and RBI in 1905, also won 61 games as pitcher from 1896 to 1900.
- September 22 – Harry Sullivan, 31, pitcher for the 1909 St. Louis Cardinals.
- October 14 – Harry Blake, 45, outfielder who played from 1894 through 1899 for the Cleveland Spiders (AA) and the St. Louis Perfectos (NL).
- October 30 – Bill Lattimore, 35, pitcher for the 1908 Cleveland Naps of the American League.

=== November–December ===
- November 14 – Vince Dailey, 54, outfielder for the 1890 Cleveland Spiders of the National League.
- November 25 – Grover Gilmore, 31, outfielder who played from 1914 to 1915 with the Kansas City Packers of the Federal League.
- December 4 – Joe Peitz, 50, right fielder for the 1894 St. Louis Browns of the National League.
- December 10 – Tom Colcolough, 49, pitcher for the Pittsburgh Pirates and New York Giants between 1893 and 1899.
- December 27 – Jerry Hurley, 44, catcher for the 1901 Cincinnati Reds and the 1907 Brooklyn Superbas.
- December 30 – Garnet Bush, 37, umpire in the National League (1911, 1912) and the Federal League (1914).
