= 1919 Philadelphia Phillies season =

Major League Baseball season

1919 Philadelphia Phillies
- League: National League
- Ballpark: Baker Bowl
- City: Philadelphia, Pennsylvania
- Owners: William F. Baker
- Managers: Jack Coombs, Gavvy Cravath

The following lists the events of the 1919 Philadelphia Phillies season.

== Regular season ==
=== Season standings ===
National League
Team	W	L	Pct.	GB	Home	Road
Cincinnati Reds	96	44	.686	—	51‍–‍19	45‍–‍25
New York Giants	87	53	.621	9	46‍–‍23	41‍–‍30
Chicago Cubs	75	65	.536	21	40‍–‍31	35‍–‍34
Pittsburgh Pirates	71	68	.511	24½	39‍–‍31	32‍–‍37
Brooklyn Robins	69	71	.493	27	36‍–‍34	33‍–‍37
Boston Braves	57	82	.410	38½	29‍–‍38	28‍–‍44
St. Louis Cardinals	54	83	.394	40½	34‍–‍35	20‍–‍48
Philadelphia Phillies	47	90	.343	47½	26‍–‍44	21‍–‍46

=== Record vs. opponents ===
1919 National League record Sources:
Team	BSN	BRO	CHC	CIN	NYG	PHI	PIT	STL
Boston	—	7–13	7–13	4–16	6–14	15–5	8–11	10–10–1
Brooklyn	13–7	—	9–11	7–13	8–12	12–8–1	9–11	11–9
Chicago	13–7	11–9	—	8–12	6–14	13–7	11–9	13–7
Cincinnati	16–4	13–7	12–8	—	12–8	15–5	14–6	14–6
New York	14–6	12–8	14–6	8–12	—	14–6	11–9	14–6
Philadelphia	5–15	8–12–1	7–13	5–15	6–14	—	6–14	10–7
Pittsburgh	11–8	11–9	9–11	6–14	9–11	14–6	—	11–9
St. Louis	10–10–1	9–11	7–13	6–14	6–14	7–10	9–11	—

=== Roster ===
1919 Philadelphia Phillies
Roster
Pitchers: Red Ames; Mike Cantwell; Larry Cheney; Rags Faircloth; Brad Hogg; Elmer Jacobs; Lee Meadows; Pat Murray; Joe Oeschger; Gene Packard; Mike Prendergast; Eppa Rixey; George Smith; Milt Watson; Lefty Weinert; Frank Woodward	Catchers: Bert Adams; Hick Cady; Nig Clarke; Walt Tragesser; Infielders: Doug Baird; Dave Bancroft; Lena Blackburne; John Cavanaugh; Fred Luderus; Mike Pasquella; Gene Paulette; Harry Pearce; Lou Raymond; Ed Sicking; Doc Wallace	Outfielders: Leo Callahan; Gavvy Cravath; Bevo LeBourveau; Irish Meusel; Possum Whitted; Cy Williams; Other batters: Bert Yeabsley	Manager: Jack Coombs; Gavvy Cravath

== Player stats ==
=== Batting ===
==== Starters by position ====
Note: Pos = Position; G = Games played; AB = At bats; H = Hits; Avg. = Batting average; HR = Home runs; RBI = Runs batted in

Pos	Player	G	AB	H	Avg.	HR	RBI
C	Bert Adams	78	232	54	.233	1	17
1B	Fred Luderus	138	509	149	.293	5	49
2B	Gene Paulette	67	243	63	.259	1	31
SS	Dave Bancroft	92	335	91	.272	0	25
3B	Lena Blackburne	72	291	58	.199	2	19
OF	Leo Callahan	81	235	54	.230	1	9
OF	Cy Williams	109	435	121	.278	9	39
OF	Irish Meusel	135	521	159	.305	5	59

==== Other batters ====
Note: G = Games played; AB = At bats; H = Hits; Avg. = Batting average; HR = Home runs; RBI = Runs batted in

Player	G	AB	H	Avg.	HR	RBI
Possum Whitted	78	289	72	.249	3	32
Harry Pearce	68	244	44	.180	0	9
Doug Baird	66	242	61	.252	2	30
Gavvy Cravath	83	214	73	.341	12	45
Ed Sicking	61	185	40	.216	0	15
Walt Tragesser	35	114	27	.237	0	8
Hick Cady	34	98	21	.214	1	19
Bevo LeBourveau	17	63	17	.270	0	0
Nig Clarke	26	62	15	.242	0	2
Doc Wallace	2	4	1	.250	0	0
Lou Raymond	1	2	1	.500	0	0
John Cavanaugh	1	1	0	.000	0	0
Mike Pasquella	1	1	1	1.000	0	0
Bert Yeabsley	3	0	0	----	0	0

=== Pitching ===
==== Starting pitchers ====
Note: G = Games pitched; IP = Innings pitched; W = Wins; L = Losses; ERA = Earned run average; SO = Strikeouts

Player	G	IP	W	L	ERA	SO
Lee Meadows	18	158.1	8	10	2.33	88
Eppa Rixey	23	154.0	6	12	3.97	63
Brad Hogg	22	150.1	5	12	4.43	48
Gene Packard	21	134.1	6	8	4.15	24
Elmer Jacobs	17	128.2	6	10	3.85	37
Frank Woodward	17	100.2	6	9	4.74	27
Larry Cheney	9	57.1	2	5	4.55	25
Joe Oeschger	5	38.0	0	1	5.92	5

==== Other pitchers ====
Note: G = Games pitched; IP = Innings pitched; W = Wins; L = Losses; ERA = Earned run average; SO = Strikeouts

Player	G	IP	W	L	ERA	SO
George Smith	31	184.2	5	11	3.22	42
Milt Watson	8	47.0	2	4	5.17	12
Pat Murray	8	34.1	0	2	6.29	11
Mike Cantwell	5	27.1	1	3	5.60	6
Red Ames	3	16.0	0	2	6.19	4
Mike Prendergast	5	15.0	0	2	8.40	5

==== Relief pitchers ====
Note: G = Games pitched; W = Wins; L = Losses; SV = Saves; ERA = Earned run average; SO = Strikeouts

Player	G	W	L	SV	ERA	SO
Rags Faircloth	2	0	0	0	9.00	0
Lefty Weinert	1	0	0	0	18.00	0
