= 1919 St. Louis Cardinals season =

Major League Baseball season

1919 St. Louis Cardinals
- League: National League
- Ballpark: Cardinal Field
- City: St. Louis, Missouri
- Record: 54–83 (.394)
- League place: 7th
- Owners: Sam Breadon
- Managers: Branch Rickey

The 1919 St. Louis Cardinals season was the team's 38th season in St. Louis, Missouri and the 28th season in the National League. The Cardinals went 54–83 during the season and finished seventh in the National League.

== Regular season ==
=== Season standings ===
National League
Team	W	L	Pct.	GB	Home	Road
Cincinnati Reds	96	44	.686	—	51‍–‍19	45‍–‍25
New York Giants	87	53	.621	9	46‍–‍23	41‍–‍30
Chicago Cubs	75	65	.536	21	40‍–‍31	35‍–‍34
Pittsburgh Pirates	71	68	.511	24½	39‍–‍31	32‍–‍37
Brooklyn Robins	69	71	.493	27	36‍–‍34	33‍–‍37
Boston Braves	57	82	.410	38½	29‍–‍38	28‍–‍44
St. Louis Cardinals	54	83	.394	40½	34‍–‍35	20‍–‍48
Philadelphia Phillies	47	90	.343	47½	26‍–‍44	21‍–‍46

=== Record vs. opponents ===
1919 National League record Sources:
Team	BSN	BRO	CHC	CIN	NYG	PHI	PIT	STL
Boston	—	7–13	7–13	4–16	6–14	15–5	8–11	10–10–1
Brooklyn	13–7	—	9–11	7–13	8–12	12–8–1	9–11	11–9
Chicago	13–7	11–9	—	8–12	6–14	13–7	11–9	13–7
Cincinnati	16–4	13–7	12–8	—	12–8	15–5	14–6	14–6
New York	14–6	12–8	14–6	8–12	—	14–6	11–9	14–6
Philadelphia	5–15	8–12–1	7–13	5–15	6–14	—	6–14	10–7
Pittsburgh	11–8	11–9	9–11	6–14	9–11	14–6	—	11–9
St. Louis	10–10–1	9–11	7–13	6–14	6–14	7–10	9–11	—

=== Notable transactions ===
- May 1919: Walton Cruise was purchased from the Cardinals by the Boston Braves.

=== Roster ===
1919 St. Louis Cardinals
Roster
Pitchers: Red Ames; Bill Bolden; Bill Doak; Marv Goodwin; Oscar Horstmann; Elmer Jacobs; Will Koenigsmark; Jakie May; Lee Meadows; Roy Parker; Art Reinhart; Ferdie Schupp; Bill Sherdel; Oscar Tuero; Frank Woodward	Catchers: Verne Clemons; Pickles Dillhoefer; Frank Snyder; Infielders: Doug Baird; Sam Fishburn; Bob Fisher; Rogers Hornsby; Hal Janvrin; Wally Kimmick; Doc Lavan; Roy Leslie; Dots Miller; Fritz Mollwitz; Gene Paulette; Milt Stock	Outfielders: Walton Cruise; Cliff Heathcote; Austin McHenry; Joe Schultz; Burt Shotton; Jack Smith; Other batters: Mike Pasquella	Manager: Branch Rickey

== Player stats ==
=== Batting ===
==== Starters by position ====
Note: Pos = Position; G = Games played; AB = At bats; H = Hits; Avg. = Batting average; HR = Home runs; RBI = Runs batted in

Pos	Player	G	AB	H	Avg.	HR	RBI
C	Verne Clemons	88	239	63	.264	2	22
1B	Dots Miller	101	346	80	.231	1	24
2B	Milt Stock	135	492	151	.307	0	52
SS	Doc Lavan	100	356	86	.242	1	25
3B	Rogers Hornsby	138	512	163	.318	8	71
OF	Cliff Heathcote	114	401	112	.279	1	29
OF	Austin McHenry	110	371	106	.286	1	47
OF	Jack Smith	119	408	91	.223	0	15

==== Other batters ====
Note: G = Games played; AB = At bats; H = Hits; Avg. = Batting average; HR = Home runs; RBI = Runs batted in

Player	G	AB	H	Avg.	HR	RBI
Burt Shotton	85	270	77	.285	1	20
Joe Schultz	88	229	58	.253	2	21
Frank Snyder	50	154	28	.182	0	14
Gene Paulette	43	144	31	.215	0	11
Pickles Dillhoefer	45	108	23	.213	0	12
Fritz Mollwitz	25	83	19	.229	0	5
Doug Baird	16	33	7	.212	0	4
Roy Leslie	12	24	5	.208	0	4
Walton Cruise	9	21	2	.095	0	0
Hal Janvrin	7	14	3	.214	0	1
Bob Fisher	3	11	3	.273	0	1
Sam Fishburn	9	6	2	.333	0	2
Wally Kimmick	2	1	0	.000	0	0
Mike Pasquella	1	1	0	.000	0	0

=== Pitching ===
==== Starting pitchers ====
Note: G = Games pitched; IP = Innings pitched; W = Wins; L = Losses; ERA = Earned run average; SO = Strikeouts

Player	G	IP	W	L	ERA	SO
Bill Doak	31	202.2	13	14	3.11	69
Ferdie Schupp	10	69.2	4	4	3.75	37

==== Other pitchers ====
Note: G = Games pitched; IP = Innings pitched; W = Wins; L = Losses; ERA = Earned run average; SO = Strikeouts

Player	G	IP	W	L	ERA	SO
Marv Goodwin	33	179.0	11	9	2.51	48
Oscar Tuero	45	154.2	5	7	3.20	45
Bill Sherdel	36	137.1	5	9	3.47	52
Jakie May	28	125.2	3	12	3.22	58
Lee Meadows	22	92.0	4	10	3.03	28
Elmer Jacobs	17	85.1	3	6	2.53	31
Frank Woodward	17	72.0	3	5	2.63	18
Red Ames	23	70.0	3	5	4.89	19
Oscar Horstmann	6	15.0	0	1	3.00	5
Bill Bolden	3	12.0	0	1	5.25	4

==== Relief pitchers ====
Note: G = Games pitched; W = Wins; L = Losses; SV = Saves; ERA = Earned run average; SO = Strikeouts

Player	G	W	L	SV	ERA	SO
Roy Parker	2	0	0	0	31.50	0
Will Koenigsmark	1	0	0	0	inf	0
Art Reinhart	1	0	0	0	---	0

== Farm system ==
Level	Team	League	Manager
Class B	Houston Buffaloes	Texas League	Al Bridwell
