= 1919 Brooklyn Robins season =

1919 Brooklyn Robins
- League: National League
- Ballpark: Ebbets Field
- City: Brooklyn, New York
- Record: 69–71 (.493)
- League place: 5th
- Owners: Charles Ebbets, Ed McKeever, Stephen McKeever
- President: Charles Ebbets
- Managers: Wilbert Robinson

The 1919 Brooklyn Robins finished the season in fifth place.

== Offseason ==
- February 1, 1919: Jake Daubert was traded by the Robins to the Cincinnati Reds for Tommy Griffith.

== Regular season ==
=== Season standings ===
National League
Team	W	L	Pct.	GB	Home	Road
Cincinnati Reds	96	44	.686	—	51‍–‍19	45‍–‍25
New York Giants	87	53	.621	9	46‍–‍23	41‍–‍30
Chicago Cubs	75	65	.536	21	40‍–‍31	35‍–‍34
Pittsburgh Pirates	71	68	.511	24½	39‍–‍31	32‍–‍37
Brooklyn Robins	69	71	.493	27	36‍–‍34	33‍–‍37
Boston Braves	57	82	.410	38½	29‍–‍38	28‍–‍44
St. Louis Cardinals	54	83	.394	40½	34‍–‍35	20‍–‍48
Philadelphia Phillies	47	90	.343	47½	26‍–‍44	21‍–‍46

=== Record vs. opponents ===
1919 National League record Sources:
Team	BSN	BRO	CHC	CIN	NYG	PHI	PIT	STL
Boston	—	7–13	7–13	4–16	6–14	15–5	8–11	10–10–1
Brooklyn	13–7	—	9–11	7–13	8–12	12–8–1	9–11	11–9
Chicago	13–7	11–9	—	8–12	6–14	13–7	11–9	13–7
Cincinnati	16–4	13–7	12–8	—	12–8	15–5	14–6	14–6
New York	14–6	12–8	14–6	8–12	—	14–6	11–9	14–6
Philadelphia	5–15	8–12–1	7–13	5–15	6–14	—	6–14	10–7
Pittsburgh	11–8	11–9	9–11	6–14	9–11	14–6	—	11–9
St. Louis	10–10–1	9–11	7–13	6–14	6–14	7–10	9–11	—

=== Notable transactions ===
- April 14, 1919: Ed Konetchy was purchased by the Robins from the Boston Braves.
- April 18, 1919: Lee Magee was purchased by the Robins from the Cincinnati Reds.
- June 2, 1919: Lee Magee was traded by the Robins to the Chicago Cubs for Pete Kilduff.

=== Roster ===
1919 Brooklyn Robins
Roster
Pitchers: Leon Cadore; Larry Cheney; Burleigh Grimes; Lafayette Henion; Al Mamaux; Rube Marquard; Clarence Mitchell; Jeff Pfeffer; Sherry Smith	Catchers: Ernie Krueger; Otto Miller; Mack Wheat; Infielders: Doug Baird; Tom Fitzsimmons; Jimmy Johnston; Pete Kilduff; Ed Konetchy; Lee Magee; Lew Malone; Ollie O'Mara; Ivy Olson; Ray Schmandt; Chuck Ward	Outfielders: Horace Allen; Tommy Griffith; Jim Hickman; Hy Myers; Zack Wheat	Manager: Wilbert Robinson

== Player stats ==
=== Batting ===
==== Starters by position ====
Note: Pos = Position; G = Games played; AB = At bats; H = Hits; Avg. = Batting average; HR = Home runs; RBI = Runs batted in

Pos	Player	G	AB	H	Avg.	HR	RBI
C	Ernie Krueger	80	226	56	.248	5	36
1B	Ed Konetchy	132	486	145	.298	1	47
2B	Jimmy Johnston	117	405	114	.281	1	23
3B	Lew Malone	51	162	33	.204	0	11
SS	Ivy Olson	140	590	164	.278	1	38
OF	Zack Wheat	137	536	159	.297	5	62
OF	Hy Myers	133	512	157	.307	5	73
OF	Tommy Griffith	125	484	136	.281	6	51

==== Other batters ====
Note: G = Games played; AB = At bats; H = Hits; Avg. = Batting average; HR = Home runs; RBI = Runs batted in

Player	G	AB	H	Avg.	HR	RBI
Lee Magee	45	181	43	.238	0	7
Otto Miller	51	164	37	.226	0	5
Chuck Ward	45	150	35	.233	0	8
Ray Schmandt	47	127	21	.165	0	10
Mack Wheat	41	112	23	.205	0	8
Jim Hickman	57	104	20	.192	0	11
Pete Kilduff	32	73	22	.301	0	8
Doug Baird	20	60	11	.183	0	8
Horace Allen	4	7	0	.000	0	0
Ollie O'Mara	2	7	0	.000	0	0
Tom Fitzsimmons	4	4	0	.000	0	0

=== Pitching ===
==== Starting pitchers ====
Note: G = Games pitched; IP = Innings pitched; W = Wins; L = Losses; ERA = Earned run average; SO = Strikeouts

Player	G	IP	W	L	ERA	SO
Jeff Pfeffer	30	267.0	17	13	2.66	92
Leon Cadore	35	250.2	14	12	2.37	94
Al Mamaux	30	199.1	10	12	2.66	80
Burleigh Grimes	25	181.1	10	11	3.47	82
Rube Marquard	8	59.0	3	3	2.29	29

==== Other pitchers ====
Note: G = Games pitched; IP = Innings pitched; W = Wins; L = Losses; ERA = Earned run average; SO = Strikeouts

Player	G	IP	W	L	ERA	SO
Sherry Smith	30	173.0	7	12	2.24	40
Clarence Mitchell	23	108.2	7	5	3.06	43
Larry Cheney	9	39.0	1	3	4.15	14

==== Relief pitchers ====
Note: G = Games pitched; W = Wins; L = Losses; SV = Saves; ERA = Earned run average; SO = Strikeouts

Player	G	W	L	SV	ERA	SO
Lafayette Henion	1	0	0	0	6.00	2
