= 1919 Chicago Cubs season =

1919 Chicago Cubs
- League: National League
- Ballpark: Weeghman Park
- City: Chicago
- Record: 75–65 (.536)
- League place: 3rd
- Owners: Charles Weeghman
- Managers: Fred Mitchell

The 1919 Chicago Cubs season was the 48th season of the Chicago Cubs franchise, the 44th in the National League and the fourth season on Wrigley Field (then known as "Weeghman Park"). The Cubs finished 3rd in the National League with a record of 75 wins and 65 losses

== Regular season ==
=== Season standings ===
National League
| Team | W | L | Pct. | GB | Home | Road |
|---|---|---|---|---|---|---|
| Cincinnati Reds | 96 | 44 | .686 | — | 51‍–‍19 | 45‍–‍25 |
| New York Giants | 87 | 53 | .621 | 9 | 46‍–‍23 | 41‍–‍30 |
| Chicago Cubs | 75 | 65 | .536 | 21 | 40‍–‍31 | 35‍–‍34 |
| Pittsburgh Pirates | 71 | 68 | .511 | 24½ | 39‍–‍31 | 32‍–‍37 |
| Brooklyn Robins | 69 | 71 | .493 | 27 | 36‍–‍34 | 33‍–‍37 |
| Boston Braves | 57 | 82 | .410 | 38½ | 29‍–‍38 | 28‍–‍44 |
| St. Louis Cardinals | 54 | 83 | .394 | 40½ | 34‍–‍35 | 20‍–‍48 |
| Philadelphia Phillies | 47 | 90 | .343 | 47½ | 26‍–‍44 | 21‍–‍46 |

=== Record vs. opponents ===
1919 National League record Sources:
| Team | BSN | BRO | CHC | CIN | NYG | PHI | PIT | STL |
|---|---|---|---|---|---|---|---|---|
| Boston | — | 7–13 | 7–13 | 4–16 | 6–14 | 15–5 | 8–11 | 10–10–1 |
| Brooklyn | 13–7 | — | 9–11 | 7–13 | 8–12 | 12–8–1 | 9–11 | 11–9 |
| Chicago | 13–7 | 11–9 | — | 8–12 | 6–14 | 13–7 | 11–9 | 13–7 |
| Cincinnati | 16–4 | 13–7 | 12–8 | — | 12–8 | 15–5 | 14–6 | 14–6 |
| New York | 14–6 | 12–8 | 14–6 | 8–12 | — | 14–6 | 11–9 | 14–6 |
| Philadelphia | 5–15 | 8–12–1 | 7–13 | 5–15 | 6–14 | — | 6–14 | 10–7 |
| Pittsburgh | 11–8 | 11–9 | 9–11 | 6–14 | 9–11 | 14–6 | — | 11–9 |
| St. Louis | 10–10–1 | 9–11 | 7–13 | 6–14 | 6–14 | 7–10 | 9–11 | — |

== Roster ==
1919 Chicago Cubs
Roster
| Pitchers: Pete Alexander; Sweetbreads Bailey; Paul Carter; Phil Douglas; Claude Hendrix; Speed Martin; Joel Newkirk; Lefty Tyler; Hippo Vaughn; Harry Weaver | Catchers: Tom Daly; Bill Killefer; Bob O'Farrell; Infielders: Charlie Deal; Buck Herzog; Charlie Hollocher; Pete Kilduff; Fred Lear; Fred Merkle; Charlie Pick | Outfielders: Turner Barber; Max Flack; Bernie Friberg; Lee Magee; Les Mann; Bill McCabe; Dode Paskert; Hal Reilly; Dave Robertson | Manager: Fred Mitchell |

== Player stats ==
=== Batting ===
==== Starters by position ====
Note: Pos = Position; G = Games played; AB = At bats; H = Hits; Avg. = Batting average; HR = Home runs; RBI = Runs batted in

| Pos | Player | G | AB | H | Avg. | HR | RBI |
|---|---|---|---|---|---|---|---|
| C | Bill Killefer | 103 | 315 | 90 | .286 | 0 | 22 |
| 1B | Fred Merkle | 133 | 498 | 133 | .267 | 3 | 62 |
| 2B | Charlie Pick | 75 | 269 | 65 | .242 | 0 | 18 |
| SS | Charlie Hollocher | 115 | 430 | 116 | .270 | 3 | 26 |
| 3B | Charlie Deal | 116 | 405 | 117 | .289 | 2 | 52 |
| OF | Dode Paskert | 88 | 270 | 53 | .196 | 2 | 29 |
| OF | Leslie Mann | 80 | 299 | 68 | .227 | 1 | 22 |
| OF | Max Flack | 116 | 469 | 138 | .294 | 6 | 35 |

==== Other batters ====
Note: G = Games played; AB = At bats; H = Hits; Avg. = Batting average; HR = Home runs; RBI = Runs batted in

| Player | G | AB | H | Avg. | HR | RBI |
|---|---|---|---|---|---|---|
| Lee Magee | 79 | 267 | 78 | .292 | 1 | 17 |
| Turner Barber | 76 | 230 | 72 | .313 | 0 | 21 |
| Buck Herzog | 52 | 193 | 53 | .275 | 0 | 17 |
| Bob O'Farrell | 49 | 125 | 27 | .216 | 0 | 9 |
| Dave Robertson | 27 | 96 | 20 | .208 | 1 | 10 |
| Pete Kilduff | 31 | 88 | 24 | .273 | 0 | 8 |
| Bill McCabe | 33 | 84 | 13 | .155 | 0 | 5 |
| Fred Lear | 40 | 76 | 17 | .224 | 1 | 11 |
| Tom Daly | 25 | 50 | 11 | .220 | 0 | 1 |
| Bernie Friberg | 8 | 20 | 4 | .200 | 0 | 1 |
| Hal Reilly | 1 | 3 | 0 | .000 | 0 | 0 |

=== Pitching ===
==== Starting pitchers ====
Note: G = Games pitched; IP = Innings pitched; W = Wins; L = Losses; ERA = Earned run average; SO = Strikeouts

| Player | G | IP | W | L | ERA | SO |
|---|---|---|---|---|---|---|
| Hippo Vaughn | 38 | 306.2 | 21 | 14 | 1.79 | 141 |
| Pete Alexander | 30 | 235.0 | 16 | 11 | 1.72 | 121 |
| Claude Hendrix | 33 | 206.1 | 10 | 14 | 2.62 | 69 |
| Phil Douglas | 25 | 161.2 | 10 | 6 | 2.00 | 63 |
| Lefty Tyler | 6 | 30.0 | 2 | 2 | 2.10 | 9 |

==== Other pitchers ====
Note: G = Games pitched; IP = Innings pitched; W = Wins; L = Losses; ERA = Earned run average; SO = Strikeouts

| Player | G | IP | W | L | ERA | SO |
|---|---|---|---|---|---|---|
| Speed Martin | 35 | 163.2 | 8 | 8 | 2.47 | 54 |
| Paul Carter | 28 | 85.0 | 5 | 4 | 2.65 | 17 |
| Sweetbread Bailey | 21 | 71.1 | 3 | 5 | 3.15 | 19 |
| Harry Weaver | 2 | 3.1 | 0 | 1 | 10.80 | 1 |

==== Relief pitchers ====
Note: G = Games pitched; W = Wins; L = Losses; SV = Saves; ERA = Earned run average; SO = Strikeouts

| Player | G | W | L | SV | ERA | SO |
|---|---|---|---|---|---|---|
| Joel Newkirk | 1 | 0 | 0 | 0 | 13.50 | 1 |
