= Hal Reilly =

American baseball player (1894–1957)

- Left fielder
- Born: April 1, 1894; Oshkosh, Wisconsin
- Died: December 24, 1957 (aged 63); Chicago, Illinois

MLB debut
- June 19, 1919, for the Chicago Cubs

Last MLB appearance
- June 19, 1919, for the Chicago Cubs

Career statistics
- Games played: 1
- At bats: 3
- Hits: 0

Teams
- Chicago Cubs (1919)

Harold "Hal" John Reilly (April 1, 1894 – December 24, 1957) was a Major League Baseball left fielder. He was a member of the Chicago Cubs in 1919. He appeared in only one major league game and went 0-for-3.
