= Sweetbread Bailey =

American baseball player (1895–1939)

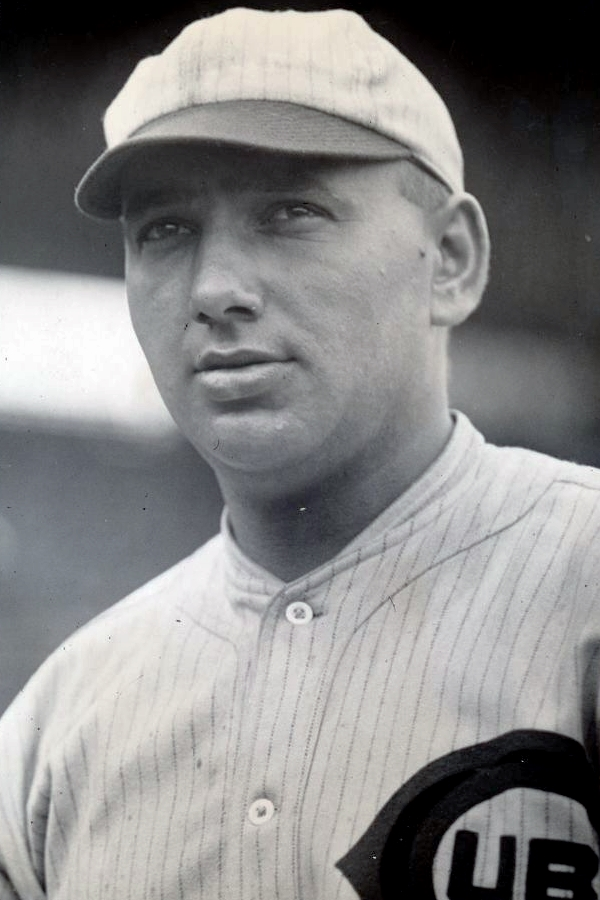
- Bailey with the Chicago Cubs in 1919
- Pitcher
- Born: February 12, 1895; Joliet, Illinois, U.S.
- Died: September 27, 1939 (aged 44); Joliet, Illinois, U.S.
- Batted: Right Threw: Right

MLB debut
- May 23, 1919, for the Chicago Cubs

Last MLB appearance
- June 11, 1921, for the Brooklyn Robins

MLB statistics
- Win–loss record: 4–7
- Earned run average: 4.59
- Strikeouts: 35
- Stats at Baseball Reference

Teams
- Chicago Cubs (1919–1921); Brooklyn Robins (1921)

Abraham Lincoln "Sweetbread" Bailey (February 12, 1895 – September 27, 1939) was a Major League Baseball pitcher for the Chicago Cubs and Brooklyn Robins from 1919 to 1921. He also served in the military in 1917 during World War I.

He died at the age of 44 in his hometown of Joliet, Illinois of cancer of his pituitary gland, and is interred at Elmhurst Cemetery.
