= 1919 Cincinnati Reds season =

1919 Cincinnati Reds
- World Series champions National League champions
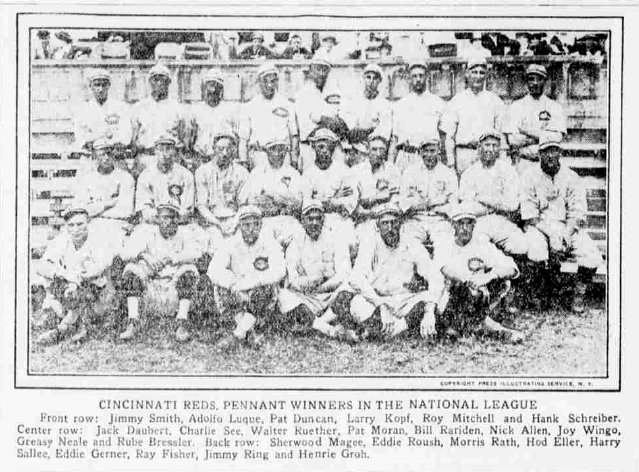
- League: National League
- Ballpark: Redland Field
- City: Cincinnati, Ohio
- Owners: Garry Herrmann
- Managers: Pat Moran

The 1919 Cincinnati Reds season was a season in American baseball. The Reds won the National League pennant, then went on to win the 1919 World Series. The team's accomplishments were overshadowed by the subsequent Black Sox Scandal, when it was discovered that their American League opponents, the Chicago White Sox had conspired to throw the series.

== Off-season ==
Reds manager Christy Mathewson, who left the club late in the 1918 season to enlist in the United States Army for World War I, was accidentally gassed during a chemical training exercise and subsequently developed tuberculosis. Mathewson served with the American Expeditionary Force until February 1919 and was discharged later that month, however, it became apparent that he was too sick to manage the Reds. Cincinnati replaced Mathewson with Pat Moran. Moran had previously managed the Philadelphia Phillies from 1915 until 1918, leading the team to a 323–257 record, and won the National League pennant in 1915. In the 1915 World Series, the Phillies lost to the Boston Red Sox.

On February 1, the Reds traded away outfielder Tommy Griffith to the Brooklyn Robins in exchange for first baseman Jake Daubert. Daubert, who had spent his entire nine-year career with Brooklyn, hit .308 with two home runs, 47 RBI and a league high 15 triples in 108 games during the 1918 season. Daubert was named the National League Most Valuable Player during the 1913 season, when he led the league with a .350 batting average, two home runs, 52 RBI in 139 games.

With Daubert now playing first base, the Reds traded away first baseman Hal Chase to the New York Giants for first baseman Walter Holke and catcher Bill Rariden. Holke was then shipped to the Boston Braves for infielder/outfielder Jimmy Smith. Rariden batted .224 with 17 RBI in 69 games with the Giants during the 1918 season, while Smith hit .225 with a home run and 14 RBI in 34 games with the Braves.

In March, the Reds selected pitchers Ray Fisher from the New York Yankees and Slim Sallee from the New York Giants on waivers. Fisher, who spent the 1918 enlisted in the United States Army, had pitched with New York from 1910 to 1917, earning a 76–78 record with a 2.91 ERA in 219 games pitched. His best season was in 1915, as Fisher had a record of 18–11 with a 2.11 ERA in 30 games. Sallee, who broke into the league with the St. Louis Cardinals in 1908, had an 8–8 record and a 2.25 ERA in 18 games with the Giants in 1918.

== Regular season ==
The Reds, who were looking to build off of a solid 68–60 record during the 1918 season, their highest winning percentage since 1904, started off the 1919 season with seven consecutive wins, and nine wins in their first 10 games, to take an early lead in the National League standings. The Reds did slump over their next 26 games, going 11–15 to drop their overall record to 20–16, and slipped into second place, four games behind the New York Giants.

Cincinnati put together a record of 24–7 in their next 31 games, moving to a 44–23 record and into first place in the National League, just ahead of the Giants. By the end of July, despite a very strong 59–28 record, the Reds and Giants were tied for first place.

On August 3, 1919, up 2.5 games on the second place Giants, 43,000 fans crowded into Redlands Field to see the Reds host the Giants. The official attendance was 31,363, but it was reported in the press, "Forty-three thousand baseball enthusiasts were wadded tightly into every conceivable corner that would hold a human being and it was not the fault of the rooting that the Reds lost."

In August, the Reds begin to pull away from the Giants, as on August 26, Cincinnati had a record of 81-34 and had built a nine-game lead over New York. Also in August, there were accusations that the teams playing the Reds were throwing their games to allow the Reds to win. The Reds continued to win in the last month of the season, and on September 18, Cincinnati defeated the Brooklyn Robins 2–0 to win their 93rd game of the season, which set a team record, besting the 92 wins the club had in 1898. Overall, Cincinnati finished the season with a 96–44 record, cruising to the National League pennant, as the team finished in first place for the first time since 1882. The Reds qualified for the 1919 World Series, as they would face the American League champions, the Chicago White Sox.

Outfielder Edd Roush led the National League with a .321 batting average, and he added four home runs, a team high 71 RBI and 20 stolen bases in 133 games. Third baseman Heinie Groh batted .310 with a team high five home runs, 63 RBI and 21 stolen bases in 122 games. Newly acquired first baseman Jake Daubert hit .276 with two home runs and 44 RBI. Outfielder Greasy Neale led the Reds with 28 stolen bases, while batting .242 with a home run and 54 RBI in 139 games.

Pitcher Hod Eller anchored the pitching staff, as he recorded a 19–9 record with a 2.39 ERA, leading the club with 248.1 innings pitched and 137 strikeouts in 38 games. Dutch Ruether led the National League in winning percentage, as he finished the season with a 19–6 record and a team best 1.82 ERA in 33 games. Slim Sallee, who the Reds picked up off of waivers from the New York Giants before the season began, led the club in victories, as he finished the season with a 21–7 record and a 2.06 ERA and had a team high 22 complete games in 29 games. Ray Fisher, another Reds waiver pickup prior to the season, had a solid 14–5 record with a 2.17 ERA in 26 games.

With the successful season on the field, the Reds set a club record for attendance, as they drew 532,501 fans to their home games, breaking the team record of 424,643 set in the 1909 season.

=== Season standings ===
National League
Team	W	L	Pct.	GB	Home	Road
Cincinnati Reds	96	44	.686	—	51‍–‍19	45‍–‍25
New York Giants	87	53	.621	9	46‍–‍23	41‍–‍30
Chicago Cubs	75	65	.536	21	40‍–‍31	35‍–‍34
Pittsburgh Pirates	71	68	.511	24½	39‍–‍31	32‍–‍37
Brooklyn Robins	69	71	.493	27	36‍–‍34	33‍–‍37
Boston Braves	57	82	.410	38½	29‍–‍38	28‍–‍44
St. Louis Cardinals	54	83	.394	40½	34‍–‍35	20‍–‍48
Philadelphia Phillies	47	90	.343	47½	26‍–‍44	21‍–‍46

=== Record vs. opponents ===
1919 National League record Sources:
Team	BSN	BRO	CHC	CIN	NYG	PHI	PIT	STL
Boston	—	7–13	7–13	4–16	6–14	15–5	8–11	10–10–1
Brooklyn	13–7	—	9–11	7–13	8–12	12–8–1	9–11	11–9
Chicago	13–7	11–9	—	8–12	6–14	13–7	11–9	13–7
Cincinnati	16–4	13–7	12–8	—	12–8	15–5	14–6	14–6
New York	14–6	12–8	14–6	8–12	—	14–6	11–9	14–6
Philadelphia	5–15	8–12–1	7–13	5–15	6–14	—	6–14	10–7
Pittsburgh	11–8	11–9	9–11	6–14	9–11	14–6	—	11–9
St. Louis	10–10–1	9–11	7–13	6–14	6–14	7–10	9–11	—

=== Roster ===
1919 Cincinnati Reds
Roster
Pitchers: Hod Eller; Ray Fisher; Ed Gerner; Dolf Luque; Roy Mitchell; Mike Regan; Jimmy Ring; Dutch Ruether; Slim Sallee	Catchers: Nick Allen; Bill Rariden; Ivey Wingo; Infielders: Jake Daubert; Heinie Groh; Larry Kopf; Morrie Rath; Hank Schreiber; Jimmy Smith	Outfielders: Rube Bressler; Manuel Cueto; Pat Duncan; Sherry Magee; Greasy Neale; Wally Rehg; Edd Roush; Charlie See; Billy Zitzmann	Manager: Pat Moran

== Player stats ==
= Indicates team leader

=== Batting ===
==== Starters by position ====
Note: Pos = Position; G = Games played; AB = At bats; H = Hits; Avg. = Batting average; HR = Home runs; RBI = Runs batted in

Pos	Player	G	AB	H	Avg.	HR	RBI
C	Ivey Wingo	76	245	67	.273	0	27
1B	Jake Daubert	140	537	148	.276	2	44
2B	Morrie Rath	138	537	142	.264	1	29
3B	Heinie Groh	122	448	139	.310	5	63
SS	Larry Kopf	135	503	136	.270	0	58
OF	Edd Roush	133	504	162	.321	4	71
OF	Greasy Neale	139	500	121	.242	1	54
OF	Rube Bressler	61	165	34	.206	2	17

==== Other batters ====
Note: G = Games played; AB = At bats; H = Hits; Avg. = Batting average; HR = Home runs; RBI = Runs batted in

Player	G	AB	H	Avg.	HR	RBI
Bill Rariden	74	218	47	.216	1	24
Sherry Magee	56	163	35	.215	0	21
Pat Duncan	31	90	22	.244	2	17
Manuel Cueto	29	88	22	.250	0	4
Hank Schreiber	19	58	13	.224	0	4
Jimmy Smith	28	40	11	.275	1	10
Nick Allen	15	25	8	.320	0	5
Charlie See	8	14	4	.286	0	1
Wally Rehg	5	12	2	.167	0	3
Billy Zitzmann	2	1	0	.000	0	0

=== Pitching ===
==== Starting pitchers ====
Note: G = Games pitched; IP = Innings pitched; W = Wins; L = Losses; ERA = Earned run average; SO = Strikeouts

Player	G	IP	W	L	ERA	SO
Hod Eller	38	248.1	19	9	2.39	137
Dutch Ruether	33	242.2	19	6	1.82	78
Slim Sallee	29	227.2	21	7	2.06	24
Ray Fisher	26	174.1	14	5	2.17	41

==== Other pitchers ====
Note: G = Games pitched; IP = Innings pitched; W = Wins; L = Losses; ERA = Earned run average; SO = Strikeouts

Player	G	IP	W	L	ERA	SO
Jimmy Ring	32	183.0	10	9	2.26	61
Dolf Luque	30	106.0	10	3	2.63	40
Rube Bressler	13	41.2	2	4	3.46	13
Ed Gerner	5	17.0	1	0	3.18	2

==== Relief pitchers ====
Note: G = Games pitched; W = Wins; L = Losses; SV = Saves; ERA = Earned run average; SO = Strikeouts

Player	G	W	L	SV	ERA	SO
Roy Mitchell	7	0	1	1	2.32	10
Mike Regan	1	0	0	0	0.00	1

== 1919 World Series ==
=== Game 1 ===
October 1, 1919, at Redland Field in Cincinnati, Ohio

The Reds opened the 1919 World Series at home in front of 30,511 fans at Redland Field, the first World Series game in club history. Dutch Ruether got the start for the Reds, against Eddie Cicotte of the Chicago White Sox.

After a scoreless top half of the first inning, the Reds Morrie Rath led off the bottom of the inning and was hit by a pitch. Jake Daubert then hit a single, moving Rath to third base, and Heinie Groh then hit a sacrifice fly, bring Rath home and giving Cincinnati a 1–0 lead. The White Sox tied the game in the top of the second inning as a Chick Gandil single scored Shoeless Joe Jackson.

The Reds retook the lead in the bottom of the fourth inning, when Ivey Wingo singled to right field, scoring Larry Kopf. With two men on base, pitcher Dutch Ruether helped his own cause, hitting a triple, scoring Greasy Neale and Wingo, opening up the Reds lead to 4–1. Morrie Rath then doubled to center field, scoring Ruether, increasing the Cincinnati lead to 5–1, followed by a Jake Daubert single, scoring Rath, giving Cincinnati a 6-1 and knocking Eddie Cicotte out of the game.

With Roy Wilkinson in the ballgame, the Reds added two more runs in the seventh inning, as Heinie Groh singled home Jake Daubert, and Pat Duncan drove in Groh on a groundout, giving Cincinnati an 8–1 lead. In the eighth inning, the Reds took a 9–1 lead as Dutch Ruether hit his second triple of the game off of Grover Lowdermilk, driving home Greasy Neale.

Dutch Ruether finished the complete game with a perfect ninth inning, as the Reds took an early 1–0 series lead.

Team	1	2	3	4	5	6	7	8	9	R	H	E
Chicago (A)	0	1	0	0	0	0	0	0	0	1	6	1
Cincinnati (N)	1	0	0	5	0	0	2	1	x	9	14	1
W: Walter "Dutch" Reuther (1–0) L: Eddie Cicotte (0–1)

=== Game 2 ===
October 2, 1919, at Redland Field in Cincinnati, Ohio

The second game of the series was played in front of 29,698 fans at Redland Field, with Slim Sallee getting the start for the Reds, against Lefty Williams of the Chicago White Sox.

After three scoreless innings to start the game, the Reds opened the scoring in the bottom of the fourth inning, as Morrie Rath led off the inning with a walk. Jake Daubert moved Rath to second base with a sacrifice bunt. Heinie Groh then walked, followed by a single by Edd Roush, which drove home Rath, giving the Reds a 1–0 lead. Roush was caught stealing second, making it two outs, however, Pat Duncan walked, the third Reds player to walk in the inning. Larry Kopf then tripled to center field, scoring Groh and Duncan, giving the Reds a 3–0 lead.

In the sixth inning, the Reds extended their lead to 4-0 after Edd Roush led off the inning with a walk, and came around to score after a single by Greasy Neale.

The White Sox cut into the Reds lead in the seventh inning, as Ray Schalk singled home Swede Risberg. Schalk scored on the play after two throwing errors by the Reds, as the White Sox cut the Reds lead in half to 4–2.

Slim Sallee finished the game with a scoreless ninth inning, getting the complete game, as Cincinnati held on for a 4–2 win, and took a 2–0 series lead.

Team	1	2	3	4	5	6	7	8	9	R	H	E
Chicago (A)	0	0	0	0	0	0	2	0	0	2	10	1
Cincinnati (N)	0	0	0	3	0	1	0	0	x	4	4	3
W: Harry "Slim" Sallee (1–0) L: Lefty Williams (0–1)

=== Game 3 ===
October 3, 1919, at Comiskey Park in Chicago, Illinois

The series shifted over to Comiskey Park in Chicago for the third game. Ray Fisher got the start for Cincinnati, against Dickey Kerr for the White Sox in front of 29,126 fans.

The White Sox opened the scoring in the second inning, as Chick Gandil singled to left field, scoring Shoeless Joe Jackson and Happy Felsch, giving Chicago a 2–0 lead. The Sox added to their lead in the fourth, when Ray Schalk bunted a single, scoring Swede Risberg, as the White Sox took a 3–0 lead.

Dickey Kerr pitched a masterpiece for the White Sox, as he finished with a three hit shutout, as Chicago won the game 3–0, cutting the series lead to 2–1.

Team	1	2	3	4	5	6	7	8	9	R	H	E
Cincinnati (N)	0	0	0	0	0	0	0	0	0	0	3	1
Chicago (A)	0	2	0	1	0	0	0	0	x	3	7	0
W: Dickey Kerr (1–0) L: Ray Fisher (0–1)

=== Game 4 ===
October 4, 1919, at Comiskey Park in Chicago, Illinois

The fourth game of the series was played at Comiskey Park in Chicago, with Jimmy Ring starting for the Reds, against Eddie Cicotte of the White Sox in front of 34,363 fans.

After four scoreless innings, the Reds caught a break when Pat Duncan reached second base on a throwing error by Eddie Cicotte. Larry Kopf singled home Duncan, giving Cincinnati a 1–0 lead. Greasy Neale followed that up with a double to left field, scoring Kopf, and giving the Reds a 2–0 lead.

Jimmy Ring pitched a complete-game shutout for the Reds, holding the White Sox to only three hits, as the Reds took the fourth game by a 2–0 score, and took a 3–1 series lead.

Team	1	2	3	4	5	6	7	8	9	R	H	E
Cincinnati (N)	0	0	0	0	2	0	0	0	0	2	5	2
Chicago (A)	0	0	0	0	0	0	0	0	0	0	3	2
W: Jimmy Ring (1–0) L: Eddie Cicotte (0–2)

=== Game 5 ===
October 6, 1919, at Comiskey Park in Chicago, Illinois

The fifth game of the series was played at Comiskey Park in Chicago in front of 34,379 fans, as Hod Eller started for the Reds, against Lefty Williams of the White Sox. The game was originally scheduled for October 5, however, it was postponed due to rain.

Both Eller and Williams pitched excellent to start the game, as it wasn't until the sixth inning before the Reds opened the scoring. Hod Eller led off the inning with a double, and came around to scoring after a Morrie Rath single, making it 1-0 for the Reds. Jake Daubert sacrificed bunted, moving Rath to third base, followed by a walk by Heinie Groh. Edd Roush then hit a triple to deep center field, scoring Rath and Groh, making it 3-0 for the Reds. Pat Duncan then hit a sacrifice fly, scoring Roush, extending the Reds lead to 4–0.

In the ninth, the Reds added another run, as Greasy Neale drove home Pat Duncan when he grounded out. Hod Eller completed the shutout in the bottom of the inning, as he allowed only three hits in the game, and struck out nine, which included a World Series record six batters in a row, to earn the victory for the Reds, as they took a 4–1 series lead.

Team	1	2	3	4	5	6	7	8	9	R	H	E
Cincinnati (N)	0	0	0	0	0	4	0	0	1	5	4	0
Chicago (A)	0	0	0	0	0	0	0	0	0	0	3	3
W: Hod Eller (1–0) L: Lefty Williams (0–2)

=== Game 6 ===
October 7, 1919, at Redland Field in Cincinnati, Ohio

The series moved back to Redland Field in Cincinnati for game six, with Dutch Ruether starting for the Reds, against Dickey Kerr of the White Sox, in front of 32,006 fans.

The Reds took the lead in the second inning, as Jake Daubert singled to right field, and then stole second base. Edd Roush was then hit by a pitch, and both Daubert and Roush were brought home after a Pat Duncan double, giving the Reds a 2–0 lead. Cincinnati struck again in the third inning, as Greasy Neale led the inning off with a triple, then came in to score after Dutch Ruether doubled, giving Cincinnati a 3–0 lead. Morrie Rath drove in Ruether after an error by White Sox shortstop Swede Risberg, as the Reds took a 4–0 lead.

The White Sox struck back with a run of their own in the fifth inning, as Eddie Collins hit a sacrifice fly, scoring Swede Risberg, cutting the Reds lead to 4–1. In the sixth inning, the White Sox cut the lead to 4-2 when Shoeless Joe Jackson singled home Buck Weaver. Happy Felsch then doubled, scoring Jackson, and cut the Reds lead to 4–3, as Ruether was pulled out of the game, replaced with Jimmy Ring. Ring allowed a single by Ray Schalk, as Felsch scored, tying the game up at 4-4.

The game remained tied after nine innings, and in the tenth inning, the White Sox took a 5–4 lead after singled, scoring Buck Weaver. In the bottom half of the inning, Kerr finished the complete game victory, as Chicago completed the comeback, winning the game 5-4 and cutting the Reds series lead to 4–2.

Team	1	2	3	4	5	6	7	8	9	10	R	H	E
Chicago (A)	0	0	0	0	1	3	0	0	0	1	5	10	3
Cincinnati (N)	0	0	2	2	0	0	0	0	0	0	4	11	0
W: Dickey Kerr (2–0) L: Jimmy Ring (1–1)

=== Game 7 ===
October 8, 1919, at Redland Field in Cincinnati, Ohio

The seventh game of the series was played at Redland Field in front of 13,323 fans, as the Reds started Slim Sallee, against Eddie Cicotte of the White Sox.

Chicago opened the scoring in the top of the first inning, when Shoeless Joe Jackson singled home Eddie Collins, giving Chicago a 1–0 lead. In the third inning, Chicago struck again, on another single by Jackson, which scored Collins, as Chicago took a 2–0 lead.

In the fifth inning, the White Sox continued to pile on the offense, as Happy Felsch singled off of Sallee, scoring Collins and Buck Weaver. Sallee was then pulled out of the game, and Chicago had a 4–0 lead.

The Reds broke the shutout in the sixth inning, when Heinie Groh hit a ground rule double, then came around to score on a single by Pat Duncan, cutting the White Sox lead to 4–1.

That would be the only offense the Reds could muster, as Cicotte pitched a complete game victory, leading the White Sox to a 4–1 win and cutting the Reds series lead to 4–3.

Team	1	2	3	4	5	6	7	8	9	R	H	E
Chicago (A)	1	0	1	0	2	0	0	0	0	4	10	1
Cincinnati (N)	0	0	0	0	1	0	0	0	0	1	7	4
W: Eddie Cicotte (1–2) L: Harry "Slim" Sallee (1–1)

=== Game 8 ===
October 9, 1919, at Comiskey Park in Chicago, Illinois

The eighth game of the series moved back to Comiskey Park in Chicago, as Hod Eller got the start for Cincinnati, against Lefty Williams of the White Sox, in front of 32,930 fans.

After Morrie Rath led off the game with a pop out, the Reds Jake Daubert singled to center field. Heinie Groh then singled to right field, moving Daubert to second base. Edd Roush then doubled to right field, scoring Daubert and giving the Reds a 1–0 lead. Pat Duncan followed up with a double of his own, scoring both Groh and Roush as Cincinnati took a 3–0 lead. The White Sox then took Williams out of the game, replacing him with Bill James. The Reds added another run when Bill Rariden singled home Duncan.

In the second inning, Heinie Groh singled off of James, then was brought home after a double by Edd Roush, as Cincinnati took a 5–0 lead.

The White Sox got on the board in the third inning, as Shoeless Joe Jackson hit a home run to right field, cutting the Reds lead to 5–1.

In the fifth inning, the Reds Larry Kopf tripled off of Bill James, and was brought home after a Greasy Neale single, making it 6-1 Cincinnati. The Reds continued to pour on the offense in the sixth inning, when Hod Eller singled off of James, followed by a walk by Morrie Rath, knocking James out of the game. The White Sox brought in Roy Wilkinson to pitch, however, Jake Daubert reached first base after an error, loading the bases. Edd Roush then singled, scoring Eller and Rath, followed by a single by Pat Duncan, scoring Roush, and giving the Reds a 9–1 lead.

In the eighth inning, Edd Roush led off the inning after being hit by a pitch, then moved to second after a Pat Duncan sacrifice bunt. Roush came around to score after a single by Bill Rariden, extending the Reds lead to 10–1.

In the bottom of the eighth inning, the White Sox made a last attempt to comeback, as a double by Shoeless Joe Jackson scored Eddie Collins and Buck Weaver, cutting the Reds lead to 10–3. Chick Gandil tripled to right field, scoring Jackson, making it 10–4. Swede Risberg then hit it to Reds center fielder Edd Roush, who made an error, allowing Gandil to score, and cut the lead to 10-5 for the Reds. Cincinnati got out of the inning after a Ray Schalk groundout to stop the comeback.

In the ninth, the White Sox threatened to score, however, Hod Eller shut them down, as Cincinnati won the game 10–5, and won the World Series for the first time in club history.

Team	1	2	3	4	5	6	7	8	9	R	H	E
Cincinnati (N)	4	1	0	0	1	3	0	1	0	10	16	2
Chicago (A)	0	0	1	0	0	0	0	4	0	5	10	1
W: Hod Eller (2–0) L: Lefty Williams (0–3)
HR: CHI – Joe Jackson (1)
