= Chick Bowen =

American baseball player (1897–1948)

- Outfielder/Pinch runner
- Born: July 26, 1897; New Haven, Connecticut
- Died: August 9, 1948 (aged 51); New Haven, Connecticut
- Batted: Right Threw: Right

MLB debut
- September 15, 1919, for the New York Giants

Last MLB appearance
- September 28, 1919, for the New York Giants

MLB statistics
- Games played: 3
- At bats: 5
- Hits: 1
- Stats at Baseball Reference

Teams
- New York Giants (1919)

Emmons Joseph "Chick" Bowen (July 26, 1897 – August 9, 1948) was a Major League Baseball player who played for the New York Giants in 1919.
