= 1919 Boston Braves season =

1919 Boston Braves
- League: National League
- Ballpark: Braves Field
- City: Boston, Massachusetts
- Record: 57–82 (.410)
- League place: 6th
- Owners: George W. Grant
- Managers: George Stallings

The 1919 Boston Braves season was the 49th season of the franchise.

== Regular season ==
=== Season standings ===
National League
Team	W	L	Pct.	GB	Home	Road
Cincinnati Reds	96	44	.686	—	51‍–‍19	45‍–‍25
New York Giants	87	53	.621	9	46‍–‍23	41‍–‍30
Chicago Cubs	75	65	.536	21	40‍–‍31	35‍–‍34
Pittsburgh Pirates	71	68	.511	24½	39‍–‍31	32‍–‍37
Brooklyn Robins	69	71	.493	27	36‍–‍34	33‍–‍37
Boston Braves	57	82	.410	38½	29‍–‍38	28‍–‍44
St. Louis Cardinals	54	83	.394	40½	34‍–‍35	20‍–‍48
Philadelphia Phillies	47	90	.343	47½	26‍–‍44	21‍–‍46

=== Record vs. opponents ===
1919 National League record Sources:
Team	BSN	BRO	CHC	CIN	NYG	PHI	PIT	STL
Boston	—	7–13	7–13	4–16	6–14	15–5	8–11	10–10–1
Brooklyn	13–7	—	9–11	7–13	8–12	12–8–1	9–11	11–9
Chicago	13–7	11–9	—	8–12	6–14	13–7	11–9	13–7
Cincinnati	16–4	13–7	12–8	—	12–8	15–5	14–6	14–6
New York	14–6	12–8	14–6	8–12	—	14–6	11–9	14–6
Philadelphia	5–15	8–12–1	7–13	5–15	6–14	—	6–14	10–7
Pittsburgh	11–8	11–9	9–11	6–14	9–11	14–6	—	11–9
St. Louis	10–10–1	9–11	7–13	6–14	6–14	7–10	9–11	—

=== Notable transactions ===
- May 21, 1919: Pat Ragan was traded by the Braves to the New York Giants for Jim Thorpe.
- May 1919: Walton Cruise was purchased by the Braves from the St. Louis Cardinals.

=== Roster ===
1919 Boston Braves
Roster
Pitchers: Red Causey; Larry Cheney; Al Demaree; Dana Fillingim; Bill James; Ray Keating; Hugh McQuillan; Art Nehf; Jake Northrop; Joe Oeschger; Pat Ragan; Dick Rudolph; Jack Scott	Catchers: Hank Gowdy; Mickey O'Neil; Walt Tragesser; Sam White; Art Wilson; Infielders: Lena Blackburne; Tony Boeckel; Hod Ford; Buck Herzog; Walter Holke; Rabbit Maranville; Charlie Pick; Johnny Rawlings	Outfielders: Gene Bailey; Dixie Carroll; Lloyd Christenbury; Walton Cruise; Joe Kelly; Les Mann; Dizzy Nutter; Ray Powell; Joe Riggert; Red Smith; Jim Thorpe; Other batters: Lee King; Tom Miller	Manager: George Stallings

== Player stats ==
=== Batting ===
==== Starters by position ====
Note: Pos = Position; G = Games played; AB = At bats; H = Hits; Avg. = Batting average; HR = Home runs; RBI = Runs batted in

Pos	Player	G	AB	H	Avg.	HR	RBI
C	Hank Gowdy	78	219	61	.279	1	22
1B	Walter Holke	137	518	151	.292	0	48
2B	Buck Herzog	73	275	77	.280	1	25
SS	Rabbit Maranville	131	480	128	.267	5	43
3B	Tony Boeckel	95	365	91	.249	1	26
OF	Joe Riggert	63	240	68	.283	4	17
OF	Walton Cruise	73	241	52	.216	1	21
OF	Ray Powell	123	470	111	.236	2	33

==== Other batters ====
Note: G = Games played; AB = At bats; H = Hits; Avg. = Batting average; HR = Home runs; RBI = Runs batted in

Player	G	AB	H	Avg.	HR	RBI
Johnny Rawlings	77	275	70	.255	1	16
Red Smith	87	241	59	.245	1	25
Art Wilson	71	191	49	.257	0	16
Jim Thorpe	60	156	51	.327	1	25
Leslie Mann	40	145	41	.283	3	20
Charlie Pick	34	114	29	.254	1	7
Lena Blackburne	31	80	21	.263	0	4
Joe Kelly	18	64	9	.141	0	3
Dizzy Nutter	18	52	11	.212	0	3
Dixie Carroll	15	49	13	.265	0	7
Walt Tragesser	20	40	7	.175	0	3
Lloyd Christenbury	7	31	9	.290	0	4
Hod Ford	10	28	6	.214	0	3
Mickey O'Neil	11	28	6	.214	0	1
Tom Miller	7	6	2	.333	0	0
Gene Bailey	4	6	2	.333	0	1
Lee King	2	1	0	.000	0	0
Sam White	1	1	0	.000	0	0

=== Pitching ===
==== Starting pitchers ====
Note: G = Games pitched; IP = Innings pitched; W = Wins; L = Losses; ERA = Earned run average; SO = Strikeouts

Player	G	IP	W	L	ERA	SO
Dick Rudolph	37	273.2	13	18	2.17	76
Art Nehf	22	168.2	8	9	3.09	53
Red Causey	10	69.0	4	5	4.57	14
Joe Oeschger	7	56.2	4	2	2.54	16
Pat Ragan	4	12.2	0	2	7.11	3

==== Other pitchers ====
Note: G = Games pitched; IP = Innings pitched; W = Wins; L = Losses; ERA = Earned run average; SO = Strikeouts

Player	G	IP	W	L	ERA	SO
Dana Fillingim	32	186.1	6	13	3.38	50
Ray Keating	22	136.0	7	11	2.98	48
Al Demaree	25	128.0	6	6	3.80	34
Jack Scott	19	103.2	6	6	3.13	44
Hugh McQuillan	16	60.0	2	3	3.45	13
Jake Northrop	11	37.1	1	5	4.58	9
Larry Cheney	8	33.0	0	2	3.55	13

==== Relief pitchers ====
Note: G = Games pitched; W = Wins; L = Losses; SV = Saves; ERA = Earned run average; SO = Strikeouts

Player	G	W	L	SV	ERA	SO
Bill James	1	0	0	0	3.38	1
