= 1919 New York Giants season =

1919 New York Giants
- League: National League
- Ballpark: Polo Grounds
- City: New York City
- Record: 87–53 (.621)
- League place: 2nd
- Owners: Charles Stoneham
- Managers: John McGraw

The 1919 New York Giants season was the franchise's 37th season. The team finished in second place in the National League with an 87–53 record, nine games behind the Cincinnati Reds.

== Regular season ==
=== Season standings ===
National League
Team	W	L	Pct.	GB	Home	Road
Cincinnati Reds	96	44	.686	—	51‍–‍19	45‍–‍25
New York Giants	87	53	.621	9	46‍–‍23	41‍–‍30
Chicago Cubs	75	65	.536	21	40‍–‍31	35‍–‍34
Pittsburgh Pirates	71	68	.511	24½	39‍–‍31	32‍–‍37
Brooklyn Robins	69	71	.493	27	36‍–‍34	33‍–‍37
Boston Braves	57	82	.410	38½	29‍–‍38	28‍–‍44
St. Louis Cardinals	54	83	.394	40½	34‍–‍35	20‍–‍48
Philadelphia Phillies	47	90	.343	47½	26‍–‍44	21‍–‍46

=== Record vs. opponents ===
1919 National League record Sources:
Team	BSN	BRO	CHC	CIN	NYG	PHI	PIT	STL
Boston	—	7–13	7–13	4–16	6–14	15–5	8–11	10–10–1
Brooklyn	13–7	—	9–11	7–13	8–12	12–8–1	9–11	11–9
Chicago	13–7	11–9	—	8–12	6–14	13–7	11–9	13–7
Cincinnati	16–4	13–7	12–8	—	12–8	15–5	14–6	14–6
New York	14–6	12–8	14–6	8–12	—	14–6	11–9	14–6
Philadelphia	5–15	8–12–1	7–13	5–15	6–14	—	6–14	10–7
Pittsburgh	11–8	11–9	9–11	6–14	9–11	14–6	—	11–9
St. Louis	10–10–1	9–11	7–13	6–14	6–14	7–10	9–11	—

=== Notable transactions ===
- May 21, 1919: Jim Thorpe was traded by the Giants to the Boston Braves for Pat Ragan.

=== Roster ===
1919 New York Giants
Roster
Pitchers: Jesse Barnes; Virgil Barnes; Rube Benton; Red Causey; Phil Douglas; Jean Dubuc; Bill Hubbell; Johnny Jones; Art Nehf; Joe Oeschger; Pol Perritt; Pat Ragan; Rosy Ryan; Ferdie Schupp; George Smith; Colonel Snover; Bob Steele; Fred Toney; Jesse Winters	Catchers: Mike González; Lew McCarty; Earl Smith; Frank Snyder; Infielders: Al Baird; Hal Chase; Jimmy Cooney; Larry Doyle; Art Fletcher; Frankie Frisch; George Kelly; Ed Sicking; Heinie Zimmerman	Outfielders: Chick Bowen; George Burns; Benny Kauff; Lee King; Bob Kinsella; Jigger Statz; Jim Thorpe; Ross Youngs; Other batters: Dave Robertson	Manager: John McGraw; Coaches: Christy Mathewson

== Player stats ==
=== Batting ===
==== Starters by position ====
Note: Pos = Position; G = Games played; AB = At bats; H = Hits; Avg. = Batting average; HR = Home runs; RBI = Runs batted in

Pos	Player	G	AB	H	Avg.	HR	RBI
C	Lew McCarty	85	210	59	.281	2	21
1B	Hal Chase	110	408	116	.284	5	45
2B	Larry Doyle	113	381	110	.289	7	52
SS	Art Fletcher	127	488	135	.277	3	54
3B	Heinie Zimmerman	123	444	113	.255	4	58
OF	Ross Youngs	130	489	152	.311	2	43
OF	Benny Kauff	135	491	136	.277	10	67
OF	George Burns	139	534	162	.303	2	46

==== Other batters ====
Note: G = Games played; AB = At bats; H = Hits; Avg. = Batting average; HR = Home runs; RBI = Runs batted in

Player	G	AB	H	Avg.	HR	RBI
Frankie Frisch	54	190	43	.226	2	24
Mike González	58	158	30	.190	0	8
High Pockets Kelly	32	107	31	.290	1	14
Frank Snyder	32	92	21	.228	0	11
Al Baird	38	83	20	.241	0	5
Jigger Statz	21	60	18	.300	0	6
Earl Smith	21	36	9	.250	0	8
Lee King	21	20	2	.100	0	1
Ed Sicking	6	15	5	.333	0	3
Jimmy Cooney	5	14	3	.214	0	1
Bob Kinsella	3	9	2	.222	0	0
Chick Bowen	3	5	1	.200	0	1
Jim Thorpe	2	3	1	.333	0	1
Dave Robertson	1	0	0	----	0	0

=== Pitching ===
==== Starting pitchers ====
Note: G = Games pitched; IP = Innings pitched; W = Wins; L = Losses; ERA = Earned run average; SO = Strikeouts

Player	G	IP	W	L	ERA	SO
Jesse Barnes	38	295.2	25	9	2.40	92
Rube Benton	35	209.0	17	11	2.63	53
Fred Toney	24	181.0	13	6	1.84	40
Red Causey	19	105.0	9	3	3.69	25
Art Nehf	13	102.0	9	2	1.50	24
Phil Douglas	8	51.1	2	4	2.10	21
Bill Hubbell	2	18.1	1	1	1.96	3

==== Other pitchers ====
Note: G = Games pitched; IP = Innings pitched; W = Wins; L = Losses; ERA = Earned run average; SO = Strikeouts

Player	G	IP	W	L	ERA	SO
Ferdie Schupp	9	32.0	1	3	5.63	17
Rosy Ryan	4	20.1	1	2	3.10	7
George Smith	3	11.0	0	2	5.73	0
Colonel Snover	2	9.0	0	1	1.00	4

==== Relief pitchers ====
Note: G = Games pitched; W = Wins; L = Losses; SV = Saves; ERA = Earned run average; SO = Strikeouts

Player	G	W	L	SV	ERA	SO
Jean Dubuc	36	6	4	3	2.66	32
Jesse Winters	16	1	2	3	5.46	6
Pol Perritt	11	1	1	1	7.11	2
Pat Ragan	7	1	0	0	1.59	7
Joe Oeschger	5	0	1	0	4.50	3
Johnny Jones	2	0	0	1	5.40	3
Bob Steele	1	0	1	0	6.00	0
Virgil Barnes	1	0	0	0	18.00	1
