= 1919 Pittsburgh Pirates season =

1919 Pittsburgh Pirates
- League: National League
- Ballpark: Forbes Field
- City: Pittsburgh, Pennsylvania
- Owners: Barney Dreyfuss
- Managers: Hugo Bezdek

The 1919 Pittsburgh Pirates season was the 38th season of the Pittsburgh Pirates franchise; the 33rd in the National League. The Pirates finished fourth in the league standings with a record of 71–68.

== Regular season ==
=== Season standings ===
National League
Team	W	L	Pct.	GB	Home	Road
Cincinnati Reds	96	44	.686	—	51‍–‍19	45‍–‍25
New York Giants	87	53	.621	9	46‍–‍23	41‍–‍30
Chicago Cubs	75	65	.536	21	40‍–‍31	35‍–‍34
Pittsburgh Pirates	71	68	.511	24½	39‍–‍31	32‍–‍37
Brooklyn Robins	69	71	.493	27	36‍–‍34	33‍–‍37
Boston Braves	57	82	.410	38½	29‍–‍38	28‍–‍44
St. Louis Cardinals	54	83	.394	40½	34‍–‍35	20‍–‍48
Philadelphia Phillies	47	90	.343	47½	26‍–‍44	21‍–‍46

=== Record vs. opponents ===
1919 National League record Sources:
Team	BSN	BRO	CHC	CIN	NYG	PHI	PIT	STL
Boston	—	7–13	7–13	4–16	6–14	15–5	8–11	10–10–1
Brooklyn	13–7	—	9–11	7–13	8–12	12–8–1	9–11	11–9
Chicago	13–7	11–9	—	8–12	6–14	13–7	11–9	13–7
Cincinnati	16–4	13–7	12–8	—	12–8	15–5	14–6	14–6
New York	14–6	12–8	14–6	8–12	—	14–6	11–9	14–6
Philadelphia	5–15	8–12–1	7–13	5–15	6–14	—	6–14	10–7
Pittsburgh	11–8	11–9	9–11	6–14	9–11	14–6	—	11–9
St. Louis	10–10–1	9–11	7–13	6–14	6–14	7–10	9–11	—

=== Game log ===
1919 Game Log: 71–68 (Home: 39–31; Away: 32–37)
April: 2–3 (Home: 0–0; Away: 2–3)

#	Date	Opponent	Score	Win	Loss	Save	Attendance	Record
1	April 24	@ Cubs	1–5	Vaughn	**Cooper** (0–1)	—	8,000	0–1
2	April 25	@ Cubs	6–5	**Mayer** (1–0)	Martin	—	—	1–1
3	April 26	@ Cubs	6–3	**Adams** (1–0)	Douglas	—	—	2–1
4	April 27	@ Reds	1–4	Ruether	**Hamilton** (0–1)	—	11,000	2–2
5	April 29	@ Reds	1–8	Fisher	**Cooper** (0–2)	—	—	2–3

May: 13–13 (Home: 5–3; Away: 8–10)

#	Date	Opponent	Score	Win	Loss	Save	Attendance	Record
6	May 2	Cubs	2–4	Tyler	**Evans** (0–1)	Douglas	—	2–4
7	May 3	Cubs	1–2 (11)	Vaughn	**Hamilton** (0–2)	—	10,000	2–5
8	May 4	@ Cardinals	3–1	**Cooper** (1–2)	Meadows	—	7,000	3–5
9	May 5	@ Cardinals	5–2	**Adams** (2–0)	Doak	—	1,000	4–5
10	May 6	@ Cardinals	1–2	Goodwin	**Evans** (0–2)	—	—	4–6
11	May 8	Cardinals	4–2	**Hamilton** (1–2)	Sherdel	—	—	5–6
12	May 11	@ Cubs	0–3	Douglas	**Adams** (2–1)	—	15,000	5–7
13	May 12	Cubs	3–2 (11)	**Cooper** (2–2)	Hendrix	—	—	6–7
14	May 13	@ Phillies	2–3	Jacobs	**Hamilton** (1–3)	—	—	6–8
15	May 14	@ Phillies	8–3	**Miller** (1–0)	Watson	—	2,000	7–8
16	May 15	@ Phillies	5–0	**Adams** (3–1)	Woodward	—	—	8–8
17	May 16	@ Phillies	8–3	**Cooper** (3–2)	Oeschger	—	1,000	9–8
18	May 17	@ Braves	2–3 (10)	Keating	**Evans** (0–3)	—	3,000	9–9
19	May 19	@ Braves	1–2	Nehf	**Adams** (3–2)	—	2,000	9–10
20	May 20	@ Braves	3–2	**Hamilton** (2–3)	Rudolph	—	—	10–10
21	May 21	@ Braves	4–2	**Cooper** (4–2)	Northrop	—	1,000	11–10
22	May 23	@ Robins	4–6	Pfeffer	**Miller** (1–1)	—	4,000	11–11
23	May 24	@ Robins	4–6	Grimes	**Mayer** (1–1)	—	7,000	11–12
24	May 25	@ Robins	0–5	Smith	**Hamilton** (2–4)	—	18,000	11–13
25	May 26	@ Giants	3–4	Benton	**Cooper** (4–3)	—	—	11–14
26	May 27	@ Giants	2–10	Barnes	**Miller** (1–2)	—	—	11–15
27	May 28	@ Giants	6–2 (10)	**Hamilton** (3–4)	Oeschger	—	—	12–15
28	May 29	Reds	1–3	Sallee	**Mayer** (1–2)	—	—	12–16
29	May 30	Reds	9–3	**Miller** (2–2)	Ring	—	6,000	13–16
30	May 30	Reds	3–2	**Cooper** (5–3)	Eller	—	21,000	14–16
31	May 31	Reds	10–5	**Hamilton** (4–4)	Luque	—	7,000	15–16

June: 17–11 (Home: 12–4; Away: 5–7)

#	Date	Opponent	Score	Win	Loss	Save	Attendance	Record
32	June 1	@ Reds	4–3 (10)	**Adams** (4–2)	Fisher	—	—	16–16
33	June 1	@ Reds	2–10	Ruether	**Evans** (0–4)	—	12,000	16–17
34	June 2	@ Cubs	0–7	Alexander	**Mayer** (1–3)	—	—	16–18
35	June 2	@ Cubs	1–2 (12)	Douglas	**Cooper** (5–4)	—	3,000	16–19
36	June 3	@ Cubs	0–1	Martin	**Miller** (2–3)	—	3,000	16–20
37	June 4	@ Cubs	1–0 (10)	**Hamilton** (5–4)	Vaughn	**Adams** (1)	—	17–20
38	June 6	Giants	7–1	**Adams** (5–2)	Benton	—	—	18–20
39	June 7	Giants	2–9	Causey	**Cooper** (5–5)	—	—	18–21
40	June 10	Robins	10–6	**Mayer** (2–3)	Pfeffer	—	—	19–21
41	June 11	Robins	3–2	**Adams** (6–2)	Cadore	—	—	20–21
42	June 12	Robins	5–4	**Miller** (3–3)	Smith	—	—	21–21
43	June 13	Robins	3–0 (8)	**Cooper** (6–5)	Cheney	—	3,000	22–21
44	June 14	Phillies	8–1	**Mayer** (3–3)	Hogg	—	—	23–21
45	June 16	Phillies	6–5	**Adams** (7–2)	Woodward	**Cooper** (1)	3,000	24–21
46	June 17	Phillies	6–0	**Miller** (4–3)	Jacobs	—	—	25–21
47	June 18	Braves	5–6 (11)	Rudolph	**Carlson** (0–1)	—	—	25–22
48	June 19	Braves	6–5	**Carlson** (1–1)	Northrop	—	—	26–22
49	June 20	Braves	4–0	**Hamilton** (6–4)	Demaree	—	—	27–22
50	June 21	Braves	1–0	**Adams** (8–2)	Keating	—	—	28–22
51	June 22	@ Cardinals	7–6	**Carlson** (2–1)	Sherdel	**Hamilton** (1)	5,000	29–22
52	June 23	@ Cardinals	3–2	**Miller** (5–3)	Tuero	—	—	30–22
53	June 24	@ Cardinals	2–9	Goodwin	**Cooper** (6–6)	—	—	30–23
54	June 25	@ Cardinals	1–3	Doak	**Hamilton** (6–5)	—	—	30–24
55	June 26	@ Reds	0–7 (6)	Ruether	**Adams** (8–3)	—	3,000	30–25
56	June 27	Reds	2–5	Luque	**Carlson** (2–2)	—	—	30–26
57	June 28	Reds	0–3	Sallee	**Miller** (5–4)	—	—	30–27
58	June 29	@ Cubs	7–4	**Cooper** (7–6)	Vaughn	—	—	31–27
59	June 30	Cardinals	4–1	**Adams** (9–3)	May	—	—	32–27

July: 10–19 (Home: 5–10; Away: 5–9)

#	Date	Opponent	Score	Win	Loss	Save	Attendance	Record
60	July 1	Cardinals	11–4	**Mayer** (4–3)	Doak	—	—	33–27
61	July 2	Cardinals	2–4	May	**Hamilton** (6–6)	Tuero	—	33–28
62	July 3	Cubs	4–2	**Cooper** (8–6)	Douglas	—	—	34–28
63	July 4	Cubs	3–7	Hendrix	**Miller** (5–5)	—	—	34–29
64	July 4	Cubs	1–4	Vaughn	**Adams** (9–4)	—	33,000	34–30
65	July 5	Cubs	2–10	Carter	**Hamilton** (6–7)	—	—	34–31
66	July 6	@ Reds	1–8	Sallee	**Cooper** (8–7)	—	—	34–32
67	July 6	@ Reds	1–3	Ruether	**Carlson** (2–3)	—	23,000	34–33
68	July 7	Cardinals	14–9	**Mayer** (5–3)	Ames	—	—	35–33
69	July 8	@ Robins	1–2	Cadore	**Miller** (5–6)	—	3,000	35–34
70	July 9	@ Robins	2–0	**Adams** (10–4)	Grimes	—	3,000	36–34
71	July 11	@ Robins	5–2	**Carlson** (3–3)	Pfeffer	—	2,500	37–34
72	July 12	@ Giants	1–0	**Cooper** (9–7)	Toney	—	20,000	38–34
73	July 13	@ Giants	2–8	Benton	**Hamilton** (6–8)	—	27,000	38–35
74	July 14	@ Giants	4–5	Dubuc	**Miller** (5–7)	—	8,000	38–36
75	July 18	@ Braves	2–0	**Adams** (11–4)	Nehf	—	—	39–36
76	July 19	@ Braves	1–2	Rudolph	**Cooper** (9–8)	—	—	39–37
77	July 23	@ Phillies	1–6	Meadows	**Carlson** (3–4)	—	—	39–38
78	July 23	@ Phillies	1–0	**Miller** (6–7)	Rixey	—	—	40–38
79	July 24	Reds	1–3	Ruether	**Cooper** (9–9)	—	—	40–39
80	July 25	Reds	0–4	Eller	**Adams** (11–5)	—	—	40–40
81	July 26	Reds	2–4	Ring	**Miller** (6–8)	—	—	40–41
82	July 27	@ Reds	3–5	Sallee	**Ponder** (0–1)	—	—	40–42
83	July 28	@ Reds	7–8	Gerner	**Hamilton** (6–9)	Eller	—	40–43
84	July 29	Giants	0–3	Toney	**Adams** (11–6)	—	—	40–44
85	July 29	Giants	7–6	**Cooper** (10–9)	Dubuc	—	8,000	41–44
86	July 30	Giants	0–9	Barnes	**Ponder** (0–2)	—	—	41–45
87	July 30	Giants	6–1	**Miller** (7–8)	Perritt	—	—	42–45
88	July 31	Giants	2–5	Douglas	**Carlson** (3–5)	—	2,500	42–46

August: 14–11 (Home: 4–5; Away: 10–6)

#	Date	Opponent	Score	Win	Loss	Save	Attendance	Record
89	August 1	Braves	1–2	Nehf	**Hamilton** (6–10)	—	1,500	42–47
90	August 2	Braves	4–2	**Cooper** (11–9)	Fillingim	**Mayer** (1)	—	43–47
91	August 5	Phillies	0–2	Meadows	**Adams** (11–7)	—	—	43–48
92	August 7	Phillies	3–5	Rixey	**Miller** (7–9)	—	—	43–49
93	August 8	Robins	3–0	**Cooper** (12–9)	Mamaux	—	—	44–49
94	August 9	Robins	0–2	Pfeffer	**Carlson** (3–6)	—	—	44–50
95	August 10	@ Robins	5–3	**Adams** (12–7)	Cadore	—	—	45–50
96	August 11	@ Robins	5–2	**Miller** (8–9)	Smith	—	2,000	46–50
97	August 13	@ Braves	3–2 (14)	**Cooper** (13–9)	Rudolph	—	—	47–50
98	August 15	@ Braves	3–5	Causey	**Adams** (12–8)	—	—	47–51
99	August 15	@ Braves	2–3 (15)	Fillingim	**Carlson** (3–7)	—	—	47–52
100	August 16	@ Phillies	6–4	**Miller** (9–9)	Rixey	—	—	48–52
101	August 16	@ Phillies	0–4	Rixey	**Ponder** (0–3)	—	8,000	48–53
102	August 18	@ Phillies	3–2 (13)	**Cooper** (14–9)	Smith	—	—	49–53
103	August 19	@ Phillies	5–4	**Carlson** (4–7)	Meadows	—	—	50–53
104	August 20	@ Robins	5–1	**Miller** (10–9)	Grimes	—	1,000	51–53
105	August 21	@ Robins	2–3	Pfeffer	**Adams** (12–9)	—	2,000	51–54
106	August 23	@ Giants	6–1	**Cooper** (15–9)	Barnes	—	20,000	52–54
107	August 24	@ Giants	0–1 (10)	Toney	**Carlson** (4–8)	—	—	52–55
108	August 26	@ Giants	1–9	Nehf	**Miller** (10–10)	—	—	52–56
109	August 26	@ Giants	4–1	**Adams** (13–9)	Benton	—	8,000	53–56
110	August 28	Cardinals	1–3	Schupp	**Cooper** (15–10)	—	—	53–57
111	August 29	Cardinals	5–3	**Miller** (11–10)	Sherdel	—	—	54–57
112	August 30	Reds	1–0 (11)	**Adams** (14–9)	Ring	—	—	55–57
113	August 31	@ Reds	3–2	**Carlson** (5–8)	Ruether	—	—	56–57

September: 15–11 (Home: 13–9; Away: 2–2)

#	Date	Opponent	Score	Win	Loss	Save	Attendance	Record
114	September 1	Cardinals	4–5	Doak	**Miller** (11–11)	—	—	56–58
115	September 1	Cardinals	2–1	**Cooper** (16–10)	Sherdel	—	—	57–58
116	September 2	Cardinals	1–2	Goodwin	**Ponder** (0–4)	—	—	57–59
117	September 4	Cubs	4–3 (10)	**Cooper** (17–10)	Bailey	—	—	58–59
118	September 5	Cubs	0–2	Vaughn	**Carlson** (5–9)	—	—	58–60
119	September 6	Cubs	11–0	**Cooper** (18–10)	Hendrix	—	—	59–60
120	September 7	@ Cubs	2–1	**Hamilton** (7–10)	Alexander	—	—	60–60
121	September 8	Braves	10–0	**Miller** (12–11)	Demaree	—	—	61–60
122	September 8	Braves	3–4	Causey	**Ponder** (0–5)	Fillingim	2,000	61–61
123	September 9	Braves	6–3	**Carlson** (6–9)	Scott	—	—	62–61
124	September 9	Braves	6–1	**Adams** (15–9)	Keating	—	—	63–61
125	September 11	Phillies	7–1	**Cooper** (19–10)	Ames	—	—	64–61
126	September 11	Phillies	7–2	**Hamilton** (8–10)	Meadows	—	—	65–61
127	September 12	Phillies	5–6	Cantwell	**Miller** (12–12)	—	—	65–62
128	September 13	Phillies	4–1	**Carlson** (7–9)	Smith	—	—	66–62
129	September 13	Phillies	2–0	**Adams** (16–9)	Hogg	—	—	67–62
130	September 15	Robins	3–4	Smith	**Cooper** (19–11)	—	—	67–63
131	September 15	Robins	0–6	Cadore	**Hamilton** (8–11)	—	—	67–64
132	September 16	Robins	4–3 (11)	**Miller** (13–12)	Pfeffer	—	—	68–64
133	September 17	Robins	3–8	Mitchell	**Carlson** (7–10)	—	—	68–65
134	September 18	Giants	7–0	**Adams** (17–9)	Barnes	—	—	69–65
135	September 19	Giants	2–4	Nehf	**Cooper** (19–12)	—	2,000	69–66
136	September 20	Giants	2–0	**Carlson** (8–10)	Ryan	—	10,000	70–66
137	September 26	@ Cardinals	1–2 (12)	Schupp	**Adams** (17–10)	—	—	70–67
138	September 27	@ Cardinals	3–5	Goodwin	**Cooper** (19–13)	—	—	70–68
139	September 28	@ Cardinals	6–3	**Wisner** (1–0)	Woodward	—	500	71–68

Legend: = Win = Loss
Bold = Pirates team member

=== Roster ===
1919 Pittsburgh Pirates
**Roster**
**Pitchers**: Babe Adams; Hal Carlson; Wilbur Cooper; Bill Evans; Earl Hamilton; Carmen Hill; Erskine Mayer; Frank Miller; Elmer Ponder; Jack Wisner	**Catchers**: Fred Blackwell; Cliff Lee; Walter Schmidt; Ed Sweeney; **Infielders**: Walter Barbare; Tony Boeckel; Howdy Caton; George Cutshaw; Charlie Grimm; Fritz Mollwitz; Vic Saier; Zeb Terry; Hooks Warner; Possum Whitted	**Outfielders**: Carson Bigbee; Max Carey; Fred Nicholson; Billy Southworth; Casey Stengel; Billy Zitzmann	**Manager**: Hugo Bezdek

== Player stats ==
=== Batting ===
==== Starters by position ====
Note: Pos = Position; G = Games played; AB = At bats; H = Hits; Avg. = Batting average; HR = Home runs; RBI = Runs batted in

Pos	Player	G	AB	H	Avg.	HR	RBI
C	Walter Schmidt	85	267	67	.251	0	29
1B	Vic Saier	58	166	37	.223	2	17
2B	George Cutshaw	139	512	124	.242	3	51
SS	Zeb Terry	129	472	107	.227	0	27
3B	Walter Barbare	85	293	80	.273	1	34
OF	Casey Stengel	89	321	94	.293	4	43
OF	Billy Southworth	121	453	127	.280	4	61
OF	Carson Bigbee	125	478	132	.276	2	27

==== Other batters ====
Note: G = Games played; AB = At bats; H = Hits; Avg. = Batting average; HR = Home runs; RBI = Runs batted in

Player	G	AB	H	Avg.	HR	RBI
Max Carey	66	244	75	.307	0	9
Fritz Mollwitz	56	168	29	.173	0	12
Tony Boeckel	45	152	38	.250	0	16
Possum Whitted	35	131	51	.389	0	21
Cliff Lee	42	112	22	.196	0	2
Howdy Caton	39	102	18	.176	0	5
Fred Nicholson	30	66	18	.273	1	6
Fred Blackwell	24	65	14	.215	0	4
Charlie Grimm	14	44	14	.318	0	6
Ed Sweeney	17	42	4	.095	0	0
Billy Zitzmann	11	26	5	.192	0	2
Hooks Warner	6	8	1	.125	0	2

=== Pitching ===
==== Starting pitchers ====
Note: G = Games pitched; IP = Innings pitched; W = Wins; L = Losses; ERA = Earned run average; SO = Strikeouts

Player	G	IP	W	L	ERA	SO
Wilbur Cooper	35	286.2	19	13	2.67	106
Babe Adams	34	263.1	17	10	1.98	92
Frank Miller	32	201.2	13	12	3.03	59
Earl Hamilton	28	160.1	8	11	3.31	39

==== Other pitchers ====
Note: G = Games pitched; IP = Innings pitched; W = Wins; L = Losses; ERA = Earned run average; SO = Strikeouts

Player	G	IP	W	L	ERA	SO
Hal Carlson	22	141.0	8	10	2.23	49
Erskine Mayer	18	88.1	5	3	4.48	20
Elmer Ponder	9	47.1	0	5	3.99	6
Bill Evans	7	36.2	0	4	5.65	15
Jack Wisner	4	18.2	1	0	0.96	4

==== Relief pitchers ====
Note: G = Games pitched; W = Wins; L = Losses; SV = Saves; ERA = Earned run average; SO = Strikeouts

Player	G	W	L	SV	ERA	SO
Carmen Hill	4	0	0	0	9.00	1
