= Bill Bolden =

American baseball player (1893–1966)

- Pitcher
- Born: May 9, 1893; Dandridge, Tennessee
- Died: December 8, 1966 (aged 73); Jefferson City, Tennessee
- Batted: Right Threw: Right

MLB debut
- June 27, 1919, for the St. Louis Cardinals

Last MLB appearance
- July 7, 1919, for the St. Louis Cardinals

MLB statistics
- Win–loss record: 0-1
- Earned run average: 5.25
- Strikeouts: 4
- Stats at Baseball Reference

Teams
- St. Louis Cardinals (1919)

William Horace Bolden (May 9, 1893 – December 8, 1966), nicknamed "Big Bill", was a pitcher in Major League Baseball. He played for the St. Louis Cardinals in 1919.
