= Red Ames =

American baseball player (1882–1936)

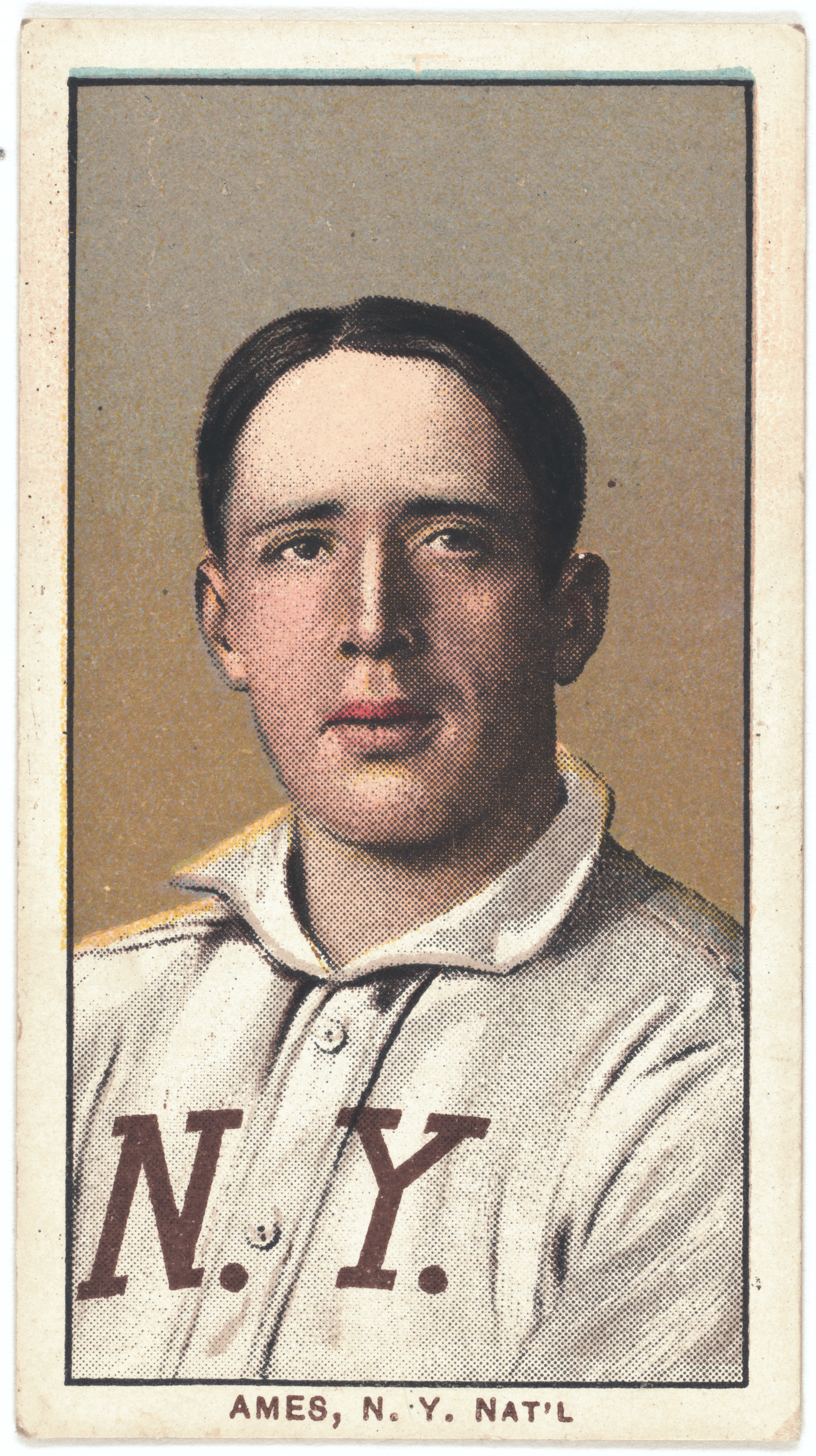
- Pitcher
- Born: August 2, 1882; Warren, Ohio, U.S.
- Died: October 8, 1936 (aged 54); Warren, Ohio, U.S.
- Batted: Switch Threw: Right

MLB debut
- September 14, 1903, for the New York Giants

Last MLB appearance
- September 15, 1919, for the Philadelphia Phillies

MLB statistics
- Win–loss record: 183–167
- Earned run average: 2.63
- Strikeouts: 1,702
- Stats at Baseball Reference

Teams
- New York Giants (1903–1913); Cincinnati Reds (1913–1915); St. Louis Cardinals (1915–1919); Philadelphia Phillies (1919)

Career highlights and awards
- World Series champion (1905)

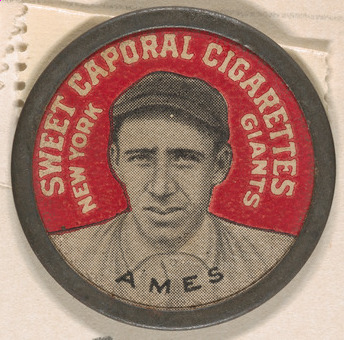
Red Ames on Domino Discs series issued by Kinney Brothers

Leon Kessling "Red" Ames (August 2, 1882 – October 8, 1936) was an American professional baseball pitcher. He played in Major League Baseball (MLB) from 1903 to 1919 for the New York Giants, Cincinnati Reds, St. Louis Cardinals, and Philadelphia Phillies. Listed at 5 feet 10.5 inches (1.791 m) and 185 pounds (84 kg), he threw right-handed and was a switch hitter.

== Major league career ==
Born in Warren, Ohio, Ames was a third or fourth starter for the New York Giants during their early period of dominance under John McGraw. He made his debut on September 14, 1903, pitching an abbreviated five-inning no-hitter against the St. Louis Cardinals (the game was called due to darkness), but was not in the rotation full-time until 1905, when his 22 wins and 2.74 ERA helped the Giants to their first twentieth-century world championship. This was by far his best season; although the Giants were perennial contenders during this time, injury and wildness kept him from becoming a star even though he was the Opening Day pitcher three years running. A career ERA of 2.63 ties him with Cy Young.

He pitched in three World Series with the Giants (1905, 1911, 1912), but appeared almost entirely in relief in the fall classic, starting only once, the last game in 1911, which he lost decisively to the world champion Philadelphia Athletics. He was traded to the Reds in 1913, and never again approached his earlier success with the Giants.

Ames' greatest distinction was being one of the wildest pitchers in history with a curveball charitably described as "dramatic." Other of his notable accomplishments are leading the National League in saves with six in 1914 and eight in 1916, and in strikeouts per nine innings pitched in 1905 (6.78), 1906 (6.90) and 1907 (5.63).

On Opening Day, April 15, 1909, he held the Brooklyn Superbas hitless for nine innings, but as neither team had scored, extra innings were required. Ames allowed a hit in the 10th inning, then went on to allow three runs in the 13th inning, as the Giants lost, 3–0. Such efforts were originally recognized as no-hitters (as no hits were allowed through nine innings), but since 1991 are no longer recognized by Major League Baseball. This nonetheless remains the longest outing by a Giants starting pitcher on Opening Day.

Ames, Lee Meadows and Bill Doak were involved in a car accident on April 16, 1919, when the car they were in crashed into a streetcar in St. Louis. Initial reports indicated that none were seriously injured.

== Later years ==
After leaving the majors, Ames pitched in the minor leagues for three more years and managed briefly in the minors in 1923. His son, Leon Kessling "Red" Ames Jr., played for Ohio State in 1927 and then in the farm system of the Pittsburgh Pirates for several years.

== See also ==
- List of Major League Baseball annual saves leaders
