= 1919 Major League Baseball season =

1919 MLB season
- League: American League (AL); National League (NL)
- Sport: Baseball
- Duration: Regular season: April 23 – September 29, 1919 (AL); April 19 – September 28, 1919 (NL); World Series: October 1–9, 1919
- Games: 140
- Teams: 16 (8 per league)

Pennant Winners
- AL champions: Chicago White Sox
- AL runners-up: Cleveland Indians
- NL champions: Cincinnati Reds
- NL runners-up: New York Giants

World Series
- Champions: Cincinnati Reds
- Runners-up: Chicago White Sox

MLB seasons
- ← 1918 1920 →

Locations of teams for the 1915–1922 American League seasons
American League
Locations of teams for the 1916–1919 National League seasons
National League

The 1919 major league baseball season began on April 19, 1919. The regular season ended on September 29, with the Cincinnati Reds and Chicago White Sox as the regular season champions of the National League and American League, respectively. The postseason began with Game 1 of the 16th World Series, known for the infamous Black Sox Scandal, on October 1 and ended with Game 8 on October 9. The Cincinnati Reds defeated the Chicago White Sox, five games to three, capturing their first championship in franchise history. Going into the season, the defending World Series champions were the Boston Red Sox from the 1918 season.

The Black Sox Scandal, for which the 1919 season is best remembered for, saw the Chicago White Sox throw (purposely lose) the World Series to the Cincinnati Reds, 5–3, in order to illegally gain money from gambling. This scandal resulted in the dissolution of the National Baseball Commission and the creation of the office of the Commissioner of Baseball. The new commissioner, Kenesaw Mountain Landis, banned eight players from baseball for life.

== Schedule ==
The 1919 schedule consisted of 140 games for all teams in the American League and National League, each of which had eight teams. Each team was scheduled to play 20 games against the other seven teams of their respective league. This 140-game schedule format had been previously used in 1903. The 154-game schedule was re-instituted for the 1920 season.

National League Opening Day took place on April 19, when the Brooklyn Robins defeated the Boston Braves 5–2 at Braves Field in the first game of a doubleheader. American League Opening Day (and most other National League teams' Opening Day) wouldn't take place until April 23, where each league saw six of their teams play. This continued the trend from the previous season which saw both leagues' Opening Day start on different days. The National League regular season ended on September 28, while the American League regular season ended on September 29 with the New York Yankees defeating the Philadelphia Athletics 4–2 at Shibe Park. This was the first season since 1915 which saw both leagues end on different days, as well as the first season since 1903 that saw the leagues begin and conclude on different days. The World Series would begin in Cincinnati on October 1, before concluding on October 9.

== Rule change ==
The minor leagues withdrew from the National Agreement, resulting in the abolition of the Rule 5 draft, as well as all existing optional agreements between major- and minor-league teams. The only way in which major-league clubs could acquire players from the minors was by directly purchasing their contracts. This change resulted in the previous $2,500 (equivalent to $46,400 in 2025) draft fee cap being removed.

== Teams ==
League	Team	City	Ballpark	Capacity	Manager
American League	Boston Red Sox	Boston, Massachusetts	Fenway Park	27,000	Ed Barrow
American League	Chicago White Sox	Chicago, Illinois	Comiskey Park	28,000	Kid Gleason
American League	Cleveland Indians	Cleveland, Ohio	Dunn Field	21,414	Lee Fohl
American League	Cleveland Indians	Cleveland, Ohio	Dunn Field	21,414	Tris Speaker
American League	Detroit Tigers	Detroit, Michigan	Navin Field	23,000	Hughie Jennings
American League	New York Yankees	New York, New York	Brush Stadium	36,000	Miller Huggins
American League	Philadelphia Athletics	Philadelphia, Pennsylvania	Shibe Park	23,000	Connie Mack
American League	St. Louis Browns	St. Louis, Missouri	Sportsman's Park	18,000	Jimmy Burke
American League	Washington Senators	Washington, D.C.	National Park	27,000	Clark Griffith
National League	Boston Braves	Boston, Massachusetts	Braves Field	40,000	George Stallings
National League	Brooklyn Robins	New York, New York	Ebbets Field	30,000	Wilbert Robinson
National League	Chicago Cubs	Chicago, Illinois	Weeghman Park	15,000	Fred Mitchell
National League	Cincinnati Reds	Cincinnati, Ohio	Redland Field	20,696	Pat Moran
National League	New York Giants	New York, New York	Brush Stadium	36,000	John McGraw
National League	Philadelphia Phillies	Philadelphia, Pennsylvania	National League Park	18,000	Jack Coombs
National League	Philadelphia Phillies	Philadelphia, Pennsylvania	National League Park	18,000	Gavvy Cravath
National League	Pittsburgh Pirates	Pittsburgh, Pennsylvania	Forbes Field	25,000	Hugo Bezdek
National League	St. Louis Cardinals	St. Louis, Missouri	Robison Field	21,000	Branch Rickey

== Standings ==
=== American League ===
American League
Team	W	L	Pct.	GB	Home	Road
Chicago White Sox	88	52	.629	—	48‍–‍22	40‍–‍30
Cleveland Indians	84	55	.604	3½	44‍–‍25	40‍–‍30
New York Yankees	80	59	.576	7½	46‍–‍25	34‍–‍34
Detroit Tigers	80	60	.571	8	46‍–‍24	34‍–‍36
St. Louis Browns	67	72	.482	20½	40‍–‍30	27‍–‍42
Boston Red Sox	66	71	.482	20½	35‍–‍30	31‍–‍41
Washington Senators	56	84	.400	32	32‍–‍40	24‍–‍44
Philadelphia Athletics	36	104	.257	52	21‍–‍49	15‍–‍55

=== National League ===
National League
Team	W	L	Pct.	GB	Home	Road
Cincinnati Reds	96	44	.686	—	51‍–‍19	45‍–‍25
New York Giants	87	53	.621	9	46‍–‍23	41‍–‍30
Chicago Cubs	75	65	.536	21	40‍–‍31	35‍–‍34
Pittsburgh Pirates	71	68	.511	24½	39‍–‍31	32‍–‍37
Brooklyn Robins	69	71	.493	27	36‍–‍34	33‍–‍37
Boston Braves	57	82	.410	38½	29‍–‍38	28‍–‍44
St. Louis Cardinals	54	83	.394	40½	34‍–‍35	20‍–‍48
Philadelphia Phillies	47	90	.343	47½	26‍–‍44	21‍–‍46

=== Tie games ===
5 tie games (3 in AL, 2 in NL), which are not factored into winning percentage or games behind (and were often replayed again) occurred throughout the season.

==== American League ====
- Boston Red Sox, 1
- New York Yankees, 2
- St. Louis Browns, 1
- Washington Senators, 2

==== National League ====
- Boston Braves, 1
- Brooklyn Robins, 1
- Philadelphia Phillies, 1
- St. Louis Cardinals, 1

== Postseason ==
The postseason began on October 1 and ended on October 9 with the Cincinnati Reds defeating the Chicago White Sox in the 1919 World Series in eight games.

=== Bracket ===
World Series
AL	Chicago White Sox	3
NL	Cincinnati Reds	5

== Managerial changes ==
=== Off-season changes ===
Four teams announced new managers in the offseason:

Date	Team	New manager	Replaced	Former job
December 31	Chicago White Sox	Kid Gleason	Pants Rowland	Coach for the Chicago White Sox (1912–1914, 1916–1917)
January 30	Cincinnati Reds	Pat Moran	Christy Mathewson & Heinie Groh	Won the 1915 World Series as manager of the Philadelphia Phillies.
—	Philadelphia Phillies	Jack Coombs	Pat Moran	Pitcher for the Philadelphia Athletics and Brooklyn Robins
—	St. Louis Cardinals	Branch Rickey	Jack Hendricks	General manager for the St. Louis Cardinals (1917–1918)

=== In-season changes ===
Two teams replaced their managers during the season:

Date	Team	New Manager	Replaced	Previous Job
July 8	Philadelphia Phillies	Gavvy Cravath	Jack Coombs	Right fielder for the Philadelphia Phillies (became player-manager)
July 18	Cleveland Indians	Tris Speaker	Lee Fohl	Center fielder for the Cleveland Indians (became player-manager)

== League leaders ==
Any team shown in small text indicates a previous team a player was on during the season.

=== American League ===
Hitting leaders
Stat	Player	Total
AVG	Ty Cobb (DET)	.384
OPS	Babe Ruth (BOS)	1.114
HR	Babe Ruth (BOS)	29
RBI	Babe Ruth (BOS)	114
R	Babe Ruth (BOS)	103
H	Ty Cobb (DET); Bobby Veach (DET)	191
SB	Eddie Collins (CWS)	33

Pitching leaders
Stat	Player	Total
W	Eddie Cicotte (CWS)	29
L	Harry Harper (WSH)	21
ERA	Walter Johnson (WSH)	1.49
K	Walter Johnson (WSH)	147
IP	Eddie Cicotte (CWS); Jim Shaw (WSH)	306.2
SV	Allen Russell (BOS/NYY); Jim Shaw (WSH); Bob Shawkey (NYY)	5
WHIP	Walter Johnson (WSH)	0.985

=== National League ===
Hitting leaders
Stat	Player	Total
AVG	Edd Roush (CIN)	.321
OPS	Heinie Groh (CIN)	.823
HR	Gavvy Cravath (PHI)	12
RBI	Hy Myers (BRO)	73
R	George Burns (NYG)	86
H	Ivy Olson (BRO)	164
SB	George Burns (NYG)	40

Pitching leaders
Stat	Player	Total
W	Jesse Barnes (NYG)	25
L	Lee Meadows (PHI/STL)	20
ERA	Grover Alexander (CHC)	1.72
K	Hippo Vaughn (CHC)	141
IP	Hippo Vaughn (CHC)	306.2
SV	Oscar Tuero (STL)	4
WHIP	Babe Adams (CIN)	0.896

== Milestones ==
=== Batters ===
- Babe Ruth (BOS):
  - Hit his first career grand slam home run against Dave Davenport of the St. Louis Browns in St. Louis as a pitcher on May 20. Boston wins 6–4.
  - Set a new American League record for home runs in a season by hitting his 17th home run on August 14 against the Chicago White Sox. Ruth broke the record set by Socks Seybold in 1902.
  - Set a new American League record for grand slams in a season by hitting his fourth on August 23 against the Detroit Tigers. Ruth broke the record of two set by Nap Lajoie in 1901.
  - Became the first player to hit at least one home run in every American League park in the same season after hitting his 29th and last home run of the season, against the Washington Senators in Washington, D.C..
- Ed Konetchy (BRO):
  - Gets his 10th straight hit, tying Jake Gettman's record set with the 1890s Washington Senators in 1897, going 5-for-5 in a 9–4 win over the Philadelphia Phillies. Both will be topped by Walt Dropo in 1952.
- Tris Speaker (CLE):
  - Ties the American League record for run scoring, crossing the plate five times in a 15–9 win against the New York Yankees.

=== Pitchers ===
==== No-hitters ====
- Hod Eller (CIN):
  - Eller threw his first career no-hitter and fifth no-hitter in franchise history, by defeating the St. Louis Cardinals 6–0 on May 11. He walked three and struck out eight.
- Ray Caldwell (CLE/BOS):
  - Caldwell threw his first career no-hitter and fourth no-hitter in franchise history, by defeating the New York Yankees 3–0 in game one of a doubleheader on September 10. He walked one and struck out five. Just two weeks prior on August 24, he was struck by lightning.

==== Other pitching accomplishments ====
- Walter Johnson (WSH):
  - Retires 28 consecutive batters during a 12-inning scoreless tie against Jack Quinn and the New York Yankees.
- Waite Hoyt (BOS):
  - Threw nine perfect innings against the New York Yankees, but gives up five hits in the 13th inning to end the perfect game, eventually losing the game 2–1.

=== Miscellaneous ===
- Cincinnati Reds:
  - Set a major league record for most runs scored in the 13th inning, by scoring 10 runs against the Brooklyn Dodgers on May 15.
- Ray Caldwell (CLE/BOS):
  - Struck by lightning during the ninth inning during his August 24 Cleveland Indian debut, following a trade from the Red Sox. He quickly recovered, reportedly saying "Give me that danged ball and turn me toward the plate", before pitching the final out of the game.
- Boston Braves vs. Chicago Cubs / Brooklyn Robins vs. Cincinnati Reds:
  - On September 21 – In a period of rapidly played games, the Cubs beat the Braves 3–0 in 58 minutes of playing time. It takes the Robins 55 minutes to beat the Reds 3–1, with Slim Sallee throwing 65 pitches, managing to top Christy Mathewson's 69-pitch complete game.
- Fred Luderus (PHI):
  - Is presented with a diamond stickpin and gold watch between doubleheader games on September 24 to commemorate his endurance effort for playing over 500 games in a row. The Brooklyn Robins defeat the Phillies twice on Fred Luderus Day in Philadelphia. The second game is the 525th in a row played by the Phillies first baseman, and he will end the season with a consecutive-game streak of 553.
- Philadelphia Phillies / New York Giants:
  - Set a record for the quickest nine-inning game in Major League history on September 28, lasting only 51 minutes for a Giants 6–1 victory at Brush Stadium.

== Home field attendance ==
Team name	Wins	%±	Home attendance	%±	Per game
New York Giants	87	22.5%	708,857	176.2%	10,273
Detroit Tigers	80	45.5%	643,805	216.0%	9,197
Chicago White Sox	88	54.4%	627,186	221.5%	8,960
New York Yankees	80	33.3%	619,164	119.5%	8,482
Cleveland Indians	84	15.1%	538,135	82.1%	7,799
Cincinnati Reds	96	41.2%	532,501	226.7%	7,607
Chicago Cubs	75	−10.7%	424,430	25.8%	5,978
Boston Red Sox	66	−12.0%	417,291	67.2%	6,323
Brooklyn Robins	69	21.1%	360,721	330.3%	5,153
St. Louis Browns	67	15.5%	349,350	186.2%	4,991
Pittsburgh Pirates	71	9.2%	276,810	29.6%	3,954
Philadelphia Phillies	47	−14.5%	240,424	96.6%	3,386
Washington Senators	56	−22.2%	234,096	28.5%	3,251
Philadelphia Athletics	36	−30.8%	225,209	26.6%	3,217
Boston Braves	57	7.5%	167,401	97.1%	2,462
St. Louis Cardinals	54	5.9%	167,059	51.0%	2,421

== See also ==
- 1919 in baseball (Events, Births, Deaths)
