= Jake Daubert =

American baseball player (1884–1924)

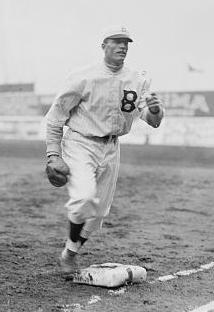
- First baseman
- Born: April 7, 1884; Shamokin, Pennsylvania, U.S.
- Died: October 9, 1924 (aged 40); Cincinnati, Ohio, U.S.
- Batted: Left Threw: Left

MLB debut
- April 14, 1910, for the Brooklyn Superbas

Last MLB appearance
- September 20, 1924, for the Cincinnati Reds

MLB statistics
- Batting average: .303
- Hits: 2,326
- Home runs: 56
- Runs batted in: 722
- Stats at Baseball Reference

Teams
- Brooklyn Superbas / Dodgers / Robins (1910–1918); Cincinnati Reds (1919–1924)

Career highlights and awards
- World Series champion (1919); NL MVP (1913); 2× NL batting champion (1913, 1914); Cincinnati Reds Hall of Fame

Jacob Ellsworth Daubert (April 7, 1884 – October 9, 1924) was an American first baseman in Major League Baseball who played for the Brooklyn Superbas (Note: The team also went by the nicknames Dodgers and Robins during Daubert's time with Brooklyn.) and Cincinnati Reds. His career lasted from 1910 until his death in 1924.

Daubert was recognized throughout his career for his performance on the field. He won the 1913 and 1914 National League batting titles and the 1913 Chalmers Award as the National League's Most Valuable Player. Between 1911 and 1919, The Baseball Magazine named him to their All-American team seven times. Baseball historian William C. Kashatus observed that Daubert was "a steady .300 hitter for 10 years of the Deadball Era" who "never fielded below the .989 mark."

== Early life ==
Daubert was born in Shamokin, Pennsylvania to Jacob and Sarah Daubert. The lack of child labor laws enabled Daubert to go to work early in his life. In 1895, at the age of eleven, the young Daubert joined his father and two brothers at work in the local coal mines.

In 1906, Daubert left his job at the mines and signed a contract with a baseball team in Lykens, Pennsylvania. He was originally a pitcher on the team before he converted to first base. At the end of the 1906 season, Daubert left Pennsylvania and traveled west to Ohio. There, he spent the 1907 season on teams in Kane, Pennsylvania and Marion, Ohio.

== Baseball career ==
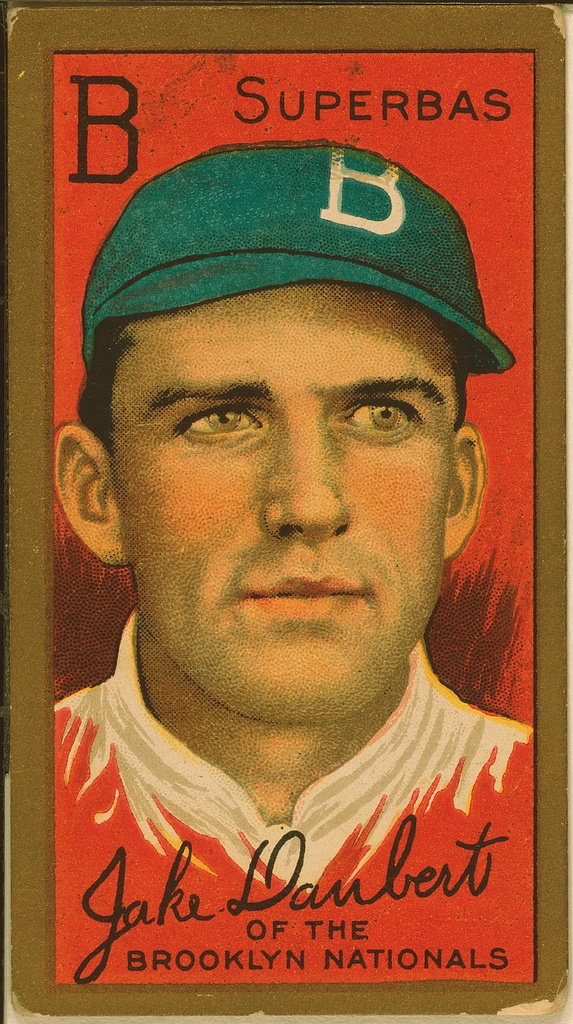
Daubert on a 1911 American Tobacco Company baseball card

In 1908, Daubert was signed by the Cleveland Indians. However, Daubert never played for Cleveland as they released him shortly thereafter. He left Cleveland and signed with the Nashville club of the Southern Association. He spent the remainder of the season with Nashville.

Daubert returned to Ohio for the start of the 1909 season. After playing the first part of the season with Toledo of the American Association, Daubert went back to Tennessee and joined the Memphis club. Like Nashville, Memphis's team played in the Southern Association. While playing for Memphis, Larry Sutton, a scout for the Brooklyn Dodgers, observed his play. Shortly thereafter, the Dodgers purchased Daubert's contract and brought him to Brooklyn for the 1910 season.

While Daubert hit just .264 in 1910, he hit over .300 in each of the next six seasons. On May 6, 1910, Daubert recorded 21 putouts in a single game, one short of the major league record.

In 1911 and 1912, Daubert placed ninth and eighth in the Chalmers Award voting. (Note: The Chalmers Award was Major League Baseball's first iteration of the Most Valuable Player Award.) The following year, he won the award. On August 15, 1914, Daubert tied Cy Seymour's MLB record with four sacrifice bunts in one game. In 1916 he batted .316 and Brooklyn won their first NL pennant. His season ended in disappointment, however, after he hit only .176 in the 1916 World Series and Brooklyn lost the series to the Boston Red Sox.

Daubert hit .261 in 1917, but the following year he hit .308 and led the NL in triples. When the season was cut short due to World War I and the Spanish flu epidemic, major league owners prorated player salaries. Daubert, who had been among the founding members of the Players' Fraternity, sued for the balance of his salary. Eventually, Jake recovered most of the $2,150 he was due. After the dispute started, Brooklyn owner Charles Ebbets traded him to Cincinnati for outfielder Tommy Griffith. Once in Cincinnati, Daubert served as the Reds' captain for the remainder of his career.

In 1919, although he hit only .276, Daubert was second in the league in runs scored and third in triples. The Reds won their first pennant since the inaugural season of the American Association in 1882. In the 1919 World Series, noted for the Black Sox Scandal, he batted .241. In the 9-1 Game One victory, he had three hits, including a triple, and he had two hits and scored twice in the final 10-5 victory in the decisive Game Eight.

Daubert hit over .300 in the next three seasons. In 1922, Daubert hit for a .336 average, led the NL in triples and had a career-high 12 home runs. By 1923, at age 39, he was the oldest regular position player in the major leagues, and he hit .292 that season.

Daubert also excelled in sacrifice hits. His career total of 392 sacrifice hits is second in MLB history, behind Hall of Famer Eddie Collins.

In his career, he had 56 home runs, 1,117 runs, 722 runs batted in, 250 doubles, 165 triples and 251 stolen bases. He recorded a .991 fielding percentage playing every inning of his MLB career at first base. When he left Brooklyn for Cincinnati, Daubert held the Brooklyn franchise record for games played at first base (1,206). The record was broken by Gil Hodges in 1956.

== Baseball unionization efforts ==
Daubert was a trailblazer in baseball's unionization movement, a controversial role that may have been a factor in his omission from the Hall of Fame. In 1913, he served as vice president of the Baseball Players' Fraternity, which petitioned the National Baseball Commission for improved labor conditions. The petition included the following requests: 1) permission for players to negotiate with any team following their unconditional release, 2) a guarantee that clubs would provide players with 10 days' notice before releasing them unconditionally, 3) a guarantee that clubs would inform players of the terms of their contracts when they are sent to another team, 4) a guarantee that veteran players would not be sent to the minor leagues when their services are of interest to another major league club, 5) a guarantee that clubs would furnish uniforms and shoes to players free of charge, 6) a guarantee that clubs would provide traveling expenses to players between their homes and spring training camps, and 7) that players receive written notice concerning any fine or suspension levied against them.

Although Daubert was unsuccessful in pressuring the commissioners to accept the terms of the fledgling baseball union's petition, he lobbied continuously for his own interests as a player, thereby earning a reputation as a "troublemaker" within the baseball establishment. A salary dispute with Charles Ebbets, owner of the Dodgers, was a major factor in Daubert's transfer to Cincinnati in 1919.

== Life outside baseball and death ==
While Daubert was in Brooklyn, he was nominated for city Alderman. He also spent time as a businessman and invested in several business ventures. His holdings included a pool hall, a cigar business, a semi-pro baseball team, a moving-picture business and a coal breaker. His most profitable business was reportedly the coal breaker, which was located in his hometown.

Daubert left the Reds late in the 1924 season after falling ill during a road trip to New York. Against his doctor's advice, he returned to play in the team's final home game of the season. On October 2, he had an appendectomy performed by Dr. Harry H. Hines, the Reds' team doctor. Complications from the operation arose, and a blood transfusion did not improve his health. He died in Cincinnati one week after the operation, with the doctor citing "exhaustion, resulting in indigestion, [as] the immediate cause of death". It was later discovered that Daubert suffered from a hereditary blood disorder called hemolytic spherocytosis, which contributed to his death. He was interred at the Charles Baber Cemetery in Pottsville, Pennsylvania. Daubert was survived by his wife Gertrude, his son George, and his daughter Louisa. As of 2026, he remains the oldest ballplayer to die while in the majors.

During his career, Daubert compiled a .303 lifetime batting average. At the time of his death, he ranked among the major league career leaders in games (4th, 2,001), putouts (4th, 19,634), assists (5th, 1,128), total chances (4th, 20,943) and double plays (3rd, 1,199) at first base; he was also among the NL's leaders in hits (7th, 2,326), triples (9th, 165), at bats (9th, 7,673), games played (10th, 2,014) and total bases (10th, 3,074). Daubert currently holds the NL record for most sacrifice hits (392). He was inducted into the Cincinnati Reds Hall of Fame in 1966 and the Brooklyn Dodgers Hall of Fame in 1990.

== See also ==
- List of baseball players who died during their careers
- List of Major League Baseball career hits leaders
- List of Major League Baseball career triples leaders
- List of Major League Baseball career runs scored leaders
- List of Major League Baseball career stolen bases leaders
- List of Major League Baseball batting champions
- List of Major League Baseball annual triples leaders
