= Larry Cheney =

American baseball player (1886–1969)

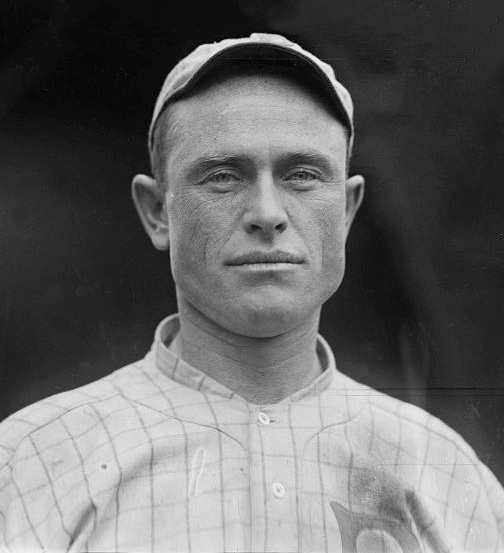
- Pitcher
- Born: May 2, 1886; Belleville, Kansas, U.S.
- Died: January 6, 1969 (aged 82); Daytona Beach, Florida, U.S.
- Batted: Right Threw: Right

MLB debut
- September 9, 1911, for the Chicago Cubs

Last MLB appearance
- September 16, 1919, for the Philadelphia Phillies

MLB statistics
- Win–loss record: 116–100
- Earned run average: 2.70
- Strikeouts: 926
- Stats at Baseball Reference

Teams
- Chicago Cubs (1911–1915); Brooklyn Robins (1915–1919); Boston Braves (1919); Philadelphia Phillies (1919)

Career highlights and awards
- NL wins leader (1912)

Laurance Russell Cheney (May 2, 1886 – January 6, 1969) was an American starting pitcher in Major League Baseball who played for the Chicago Cubs (1911–15), Brooklyn Robins (1915–19), Boston Braves (1919) and Philadelphia Phillies (1919). Cheney batted and threw right-handed. He was born in Belleville, Kansas.

Cheney debuted with the Cubs on September 9, 1911. After two appearances as a reliever, he had held Brooklyn scoreless until the middle of the 8th inning, but was hit by a line drive off the bat of Zack Wheat which Cheney deflected with his throwing hand, fracturing his thumb and nose. The following season he relied heavily on a knuckleball and spitter after his broken finger took some speed off his heavy fastball. Then he blossomed, tying with Rube Marquard for the National League lead in wins (26), leading with 28 complete games, as he finished second in winning percentage (.722).

In 1913 Cheney won 21 games (17 as a starter, four as a reliever) and led the league in saves (11) and games pitched (54). On September 14, he shut out the New York Giants while allowing 14 hits, setting a major league record for most hits given up while pitching a nine-inning shutout. He won 20 games in 1914, leading the league in starts (40) and games (50). From 1912 to 1914 he pitched 300 or more innings in each season, with a career-high 311 in 1914. Also in 1914, Cheney set a record for most wild pitches in a season opening with 4 against the Cincinnati Reds on April 14.

Traded to Brooklyn in August 1915 for Joe Schultz, after an 8–9 start, Cheney won 18 games in 1916, helping his new team reach the World Series. He pitched three innings of relief against the Boston Red Sox in Game Four of the Series, striking out five batters. Cheney then pitched for the Robins, Braves and Phillies in 1919, his last major league season, appearing in his final game on September 26.

Over nine seasons, Cheney posted a 116–100 record with 926 strikeouts and a 2.70 ERA in 1881.1 innings.

Cheney died in Daytona Beach, Florida aged 82.

== See also ==
- List of Major League Baseball annual saves leaders
- List of Major League Baseball annual wins leaders

Preceded by Jeff Pfeffer	Brooklyn Robins Opening Day; Starting pitcher 1916	Succeeded by Wheezer Dell
