= Lee Meadows =

American baseball player (1894–1963)

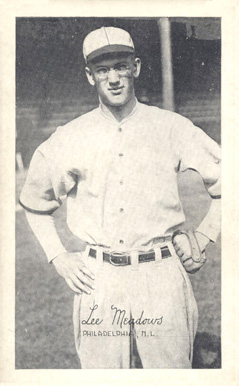
- Pitcher
- Born: July 12, 1894; Oxford, North Carolina, U.S.
- Died: January 29, 1963 (aged 68); Daytona Beach, Florida, U.S.
- Batted: Left Threw: Right

MLB debut
- April 19, 1915, for the St. Louis Cardinals

Last MLB appearance
- April 29, 1929, for the Pittsburgh Pirates

MLB statistics
- Win–loss record: 188–180
- Earned run average: 3.37
- Strikeouts: 1,063
- Stats at Baseball Reference

Teams
- St. Louis Cardinals (1915–1919); Philadelphia Phillies (1919–1923); Pittsburgh Pirates (1923–1929)

Career highlights and awards
- World Series champion (1925); NL wins leader (1926)

Henry Lee "Specs" Meadows (July 12, 1894 – January 29, 1963) was an American professional baseball player. He played in Major League Baseball as a right-handed pitcher over parts of 15 seasons (1915–1929) for the St. Louis Cardinals, Philadelphia Phillies and Pittsburgh Pirates.

He was the National League wins leader in 1926 with Pittsburgh. For his career, he compiled a 188–180 record in 490 appearances, with a 3.37 ERA and 1063 strikeouts.

As a hitter, Meadows posted a .180 batting average (201-for-1117) with 80 runs, 5 home runs, 75 RBIs and 34 bases on balls. Defensively, he was below average, recording a .947 fielding percentage which was 11 points lower than the league average at his position.

Meadows played on two National League pennant winners with the Pirates (1925 and 1927), winning the 1925 World Series. He opposed future Hall of Famer Walter Johnson as the Game 1 starting pitchers of that '25 Series. He finished 0–2 in two postseason appearances with a 6.28 ERA.

Meadows currently ranks sixth in Pirates history with a .629 winning percentage, with an 88-52 won-loss record.

Meadows was one of the few players in the early 20th century who wore glasses in the field, earning him the nickname "Specs." He was born in Oxford, North Carolina and died in Daytona Beach, Florida at the age of 68.

== See also ==
- List of Major League Baseball annual wins leaders
