= Adam Bass =

Adam Bass may refer to:

- Adam Bass (baseball) (born 1981)
- Adam Bass (politician), Louisiana politician
