= Jeff Alkire =

American baseball player

Robert Jeffrey Alkire (born November 15, 1969) is an American former professional baseball pitcher who played internationally for Team USA. As a player, he was listed at 6 feet 1 inch (1.85 m) and 200 pounds (91 kg); he threw left-handed and batted right-handed.

Alkire attended the University of Miami, where he played college baseball for the Miami Hurricanes. In 1991, he played collegiate summer baseball for the Hyannis Mets of the Cape Cod Baseball League. He pitched for the United States national baseball team in the 1992 Summer Olympics.

After his baseball career, he owned a plumbing rep business with his younger brother in California.
