= Jon Ratliff =

American baseball player (born 1971)

- Pitcher
- Born: December 22, 1971 (age 53); Syracuse, New York, U.S.
- Batted: Right Threw: Right

MLB debut
- September 15, 2000, for the Oakland Athletics

Last MLB appearance
- September 15, 2000, for the Oakland Athletics

MLB statistics
- Games pitched: 1
- Earned run average: 0.00
- Strikeouts: 0
- Stats at Baseball Reference

Teams
- Oakland Athletics (2000)

Jon Charles Ratliff (born December 22, 1971) is an American former professional baseball player. Ratliff played one game in his career, for the Oakland Athletics of Major League Baseball (MLB) in the 2000 season. He pitched one inning in relief not allowing a hit or a walk, and not striking out a batter.

== Career ==
Ratliff attended LeMoyne College. In 1992 he played collegiate summer baseball with the Hyannis Mets of the Cape Cod Baseball League. He was named a league all-star. He was selected by the Chicago Cubs in the first round (24th overall) in the 1993 MLB draft. He played eight seasons in the minor leagues.

Ratliff was featured in the book 'The Cup of Coffee Club: 11 Players and Their Brush with Baseball History' (2020) by Jacob Kornhauser.
