= Robert Neustrom =

American baseball player (born 1996)

- Outfielder
- Born: November 12, 1996 (age 29); Sioux City, Iowa, U.S.
- Bats: Left Throws: Left

Robert Michael Neustrom (born November 12, 1996) is an American former professional baseball outfielder. He was drafted by the Baltimore Orioles in the fifth round of the 2018 Major League Baseball draft.

== Amateur career ==
Neustrom attended North High School in Sioux City, Iowa, where he played football, basketball, and baseball and was teammates with Daniel Tillo. In 2015, as a senior, he batted .540 with 46 RBIs alongside pitching to a 1.07 ERA over 46 innings, and was named the Iowa Gatorade Player of the Year. After graduating, he enrolled at the University of Iowa where walked on to the baseball team. In 2017, he played collegiate summer baseball with the Hyannis Harbor Hawks of the Cape Cod Baseball League and was named a league all-star. As a junior in 2018, he started 53 games and hit .311 with 11 home runs and 36 RBIs. After the season, he was selected by the Baltimore Orioles in the fifth round with the 145th pick of the 2018 Major League Baseball draft.

== Professional career ==
Neustrom signed with the Orioles for $300,000 and made his professional debut with the Aberdeen IronBirds of the Low-A New York–Penn League, batting .272 with four home runs, 29 RBIs, and 16 doubles over 61 games. He began the 2019 season back with Aberdeen and was promoted to the Delmarva Shorebirds of the Single-A South Atlantic League and the Frederick Keys of the High-A Carolina League during the season. Over 82 games between the three clubs, he slashed .256/.321/.391 with seven home runs and 47 RBIs. In the offseason, he underwent shoulder surgery.

He did not play in a game in 2020 due to the cancellation of the minor league season because of the COVID-19 pandemic. To begin the 2021 season, he was assigned to the Bowie Baysox of the Double-A Northeast and was promoted to the Norfolk Tides of the Triple-A East in July. Over 126 games between the two clubs, Neustrom slashed .258/.344/.446 with 16 home runs, 83 RBIs, and 31 doubles. He returned to Norfolk to play the 2022 season. He missed time during the season due to injury. Over 101 games, he compiled a slash line of .231/.297/.408 with 15 home runs, 61 RBIs, and 14 stolen bases. Neustrom was released by the Orioles on March 26, 2023.
