= Art Merewether =

American baseball player (1902–1997)

- Pinch hitter
- Born: July 7, 1902; East Providence, Rhode Island, U.S.
- Died: February 2, 1997 (aged 94); Bayside, New York, U.S.
- Batted: Right Threw: Right

MLB debut
- July 10, 1922, for the Pittsburgh Pirates

Last MLB appearance
- July 10, 1922, for the Pittsburgh Pirates

MLB statistics
- Games played: 1
- At bats: 1
- Hits: 0
- Stats at Baseball Reference

Teams
- Pittsburgh Pirates (1922)

Arthur Francis Merewether (July 7, 1902 – February 2, 1997), nicknamed "Merry", was an American professional baseball player. He played in Major League Baseball for the Pittsburgh Pirates.

A native of East Providence, Rhode Island, Merewether graduated from East Providence High School in 1918. He played college baseball at Brown University, where he was a second baseman and graduated in 1922. He was signed out of college by the Pittsburgh Pirates and after spending time in Pittsburgh's minor league system, he appeared in one game as a pinch hitter for the big league club in 1922.

Following his stint with the Pirates, Merewether enrolled in a graduate program at Massachusetts Institute of Technology (MIT). At MIT, he once again played collegiate baseball, was the captain of the club, and received his master's degree in chemistry in 1925. In the summer of 1925, Merewether played second base for the Osterville town team in what is now the Cape Cod Baseball League, helping lead the team to the league title. He died in Bayside, New York in 1997 at age 94.

== Army Air Forces service ==
Merewether served on active duty as a 2nd lieutenant for two months in 1930. He again joined in February 1942 and retired in August 1946 as a colonel.
