= Tyler Mattison =

Free agent
- Pitcher
- Born: September 5, 1999 (age 27); Fort Ann, New York, U.S.
- Bats: Right Throws: Right

Tyler James Mattison (born September 5, 1999) is an American baseball pitcher who is a free agent.

== Amateur career ==
Mattison graduated from Fort Ann High School in Fort Ann, New York. He played college baseball at Bryant for four seasons. Mattison was named the Northeast Conference Pitcher of the Year 10–3 with a 2.46 ERA and 95 strikeouts over 13 starts. In 2019, he played collegiate summer baseball with the Hyannis Harbor Hawks of the Cape Cod Baseball League.

== Professional career ==
Mattison was selected in the fourth round by the Detroit Tigers in the 2021 Major League Baseball draft. He signed with the team and received a $400,000 signing bonus. Mattison was assigned to the Single-A Lakeland Flying Tigers at the start of the 2022 season, but suffered a shoulder injury in his professional debut and missed the next 2 1/2 months. Mattison finished the season with a 7–0 record and a 5.23 ERA and 46 strikeouts in 32 2/3 innings pitched while with Lakeland. He began the 2023 season with the High-A West Michigan Whitecaps and was promoted to the Double-A Erie SeaWolves after posting a 3.42 ERA over 19 appearances.

Mattison underwent Tommy John surgery in March 2024 and missed the entirety of the season as a result. On November 19, 2024, the Tigers added Mattison to their 40-man roster to protect him from the Rule 5 draft.

Mattison was optioned to the Triple-A Toledo Mud Hens to begin the 2025 season. In 20 appearances for Toledo, he posted a 3–3 record and 3.79 ERA with 26 strikeouts and two saves over 19 innings of work. Mattison was designated for assignment by the Tigers on November 18. On November 21, he was non-tendered by Detroit and became a free agent.

On December 23, 2025, Mattison re-signed with the Tigers organization on a minor league contract. In 45 games with Triple-A Toledo Mud Hens he threw 54.1 innings of relief going 4-1 with a 3.81 ERA with 63 strikeouts and 3 saves. He elected free agency on November 2.
