= Jake Schaffner =

American baseball player (born 2004)

Boston Red Sox
- Shortstop
- Born: October 4, 2004 (age 21); Janesville, Wisconsin, U.S.
- Bats: Left Throws: Right
- Stats at Baseball Reference

Jake Schaffner (born October 4, 2004) is an American professional baseball shortstop in the Boston Red Sox organization.

== Career ==
Schaffner attended Joseph A. Craig High School in Janesville, Wisconsin, where he played baseball, hockey and football. He played college baseball for the North Dakota State Bison for two years and the North Carolina Tar Heels for one. In 2025, he played collegiate summer baseball with the Hyannis Harbor Hawks of the Cape Cod Baseball League.

Schaffner was selected by the Boston Red Sox in the first round of the 2026 Major League Baseball draft. On July 17, 2026, he signed with the Red Sox for a $2 million signing bonus.
