= Chad McConnell =

American baseball player (born 1970)

- Outfielder
- Born: October 13, 1970 (age 55); Sioux Falls, South Dakota, U.S.
- Bats: Right Throws: Right
- Stats at Baseball Reference

Chad M. McConnell (born October 13, 1970) is an American former professional baseball outfielder. He played for the United States national baseball team in the 1992 Summer Olympics.

== Biography ==
A native of Sioux Falls, South Dakota, McConnell attended O'Gorman Catholic High School. He played quarterback for the school's gridiron football team and played American Legion Baseball for Post #15 in Sioux Falls. Out of high school, he was drafted by the Minnesota Twins in the 17th round (449th overall) of the 1989 Major League Baseball draft, but he opted not to sign. He attended Creighton University, where he played college baseball for the Creighton Bluejays baseball team in the Missouri Valley Conference of the National Collegiate Athletic Association's (NCAA) Division I. In 1991, he played collegiate summer baseball with the Hyannis Mets of the Cape Cod Baseball League.

In 1992, McConnell was named a unanimous College Baseball All-American by the American Baseball Coaches Association, Baseball America, and Collegiate Baseball. That summer, he competed for the United States national baseball team in the Summer Olympics.

The Philadelphia Phillies selected McConnell in the first round, with the 13th overall selection, of the 1992 Major League Baseball draft. He signed with the Phillies, receiving a $500,000 signing bonus. He played for the Phillies minor league organization until 1996.

After McConnell retired from professional baseball, he earned a bachelor's degree in criminal justice from Pennsylvania State University Harrisburg in 1999 and he became a probation officer for Dauphin County, Pennsylvania. In 2015, he was inducted into the Creighton Athletics Hall of Fame.
