= Hyannis Harbor Hawks =

Collegiate summer baseball team in Massachusetts

Information
- League: Cape Cod Baseball League (West Division)
- Location: Hyannis, Massachusetts
- Ballpark: Judy Walden Scarafile Field at McKeon Park
- League championships: 1978, 1979, 1991
- Former name: Hyannis Mets
- Mascot: Ozzie the Osprey
- Ownership: Hyannis Athletic Association
- President: Jim Hurley
- General manager: Nick Johnson
- Manager: Mitch Karraker
- Website: www.capecodleague.com/hyannis/

The Hyannis Harbor Hawks, formerly the Hyannis Mets, are a collegiate summer baseball team based in Hyannis, Massachusetts. The team is a member of the Cape Cod Baseball League (CCBL) and plays in the league's West Division. The Harbor Hawks play their home games at Judy Walden Scarafile Field at McKeon Park. The team is owned and operated by the non-profit Hyannis Athletic Association.

Hyannis most recently won the CCBL championship in 1991 when they defeated the Chatham A's two games to none to win the best of three championship series. The title was the third in team history, having won back-to-back league championships in 1978 and 1979. Since the club's inception, over 100 players have gone on to play in Major League Baseball.

== History ==
=== Pre-modern era ===
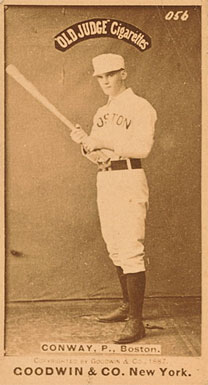
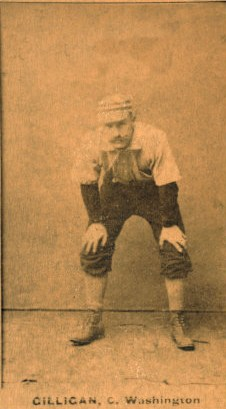
Dick Conway pitched for Hyannis and the major league Boston Beaneaters in 1888. Barney Gilligan won a major league title with the Providence Grays in 1884, and was catcher for Hyannis in 1889.

==== Early years ====
Baseball in the villages of Barnstable dates back to the early days of the sport on Cape Cod. The Barnstable Cummaquids were organized in 1867 and battled the "Yarmouth Mattakeesetts" on at least three occasions that year. After splitting their first two recorded contests, the seemingly evenly-matched teams met for a highly-anticipated third game, this time as an attraction at the Barnstable County Fair. The Cummaquids took the lopsided match, 30–13, and with their victory secured the prize of a "beautiful silver mounted carved black walnut bat costing $15." The Barnstable team met up with a team from Yarmouth again in 1883 for a July 4 contest that had become an annual event. U.S. Congressman Samuel Winslow hurled for Barnstable while a student at Harvard in 1884. An 1885 poster advertising another July 4 contest, this time between Barnstable and Sandwich, was uncovered by the National Baseball Hall of Fame and Museum in Cooperstown, New York. Although no formal league had been established at this time, the poster became the source for the traditional dating of the Cape League's origin to 1885.

From 1888 to 1892, the Hyannis town team was sponsored by "gentlemen of leisure" Charles B. Cory and Charles Richard Crane, who funded and played on the club. At Cory and Crane's expense, various well-known professional and amateur players were brought in to play alongside the Hyannis locals. In 1888, Cory and Crane outfitted the club in "suits which were of the best white flannel and red stockings," and secured the services of pitcher Dick Conway and catcher Mert Hackett, both formerly of the major league Boston Beaneaters. In 1889, Hackett was back, along with Barney Gilligan, who had played for the 1884 major league champion Providence Grays, where he was a teammate of Cape Cod native Ed Conley and batterymate of Baseball Hall of Fame hurler Charles "Old Hoss" Radbourn. Hackett was back again as team captain in 1891, and in the first game of the season, Hyannis hosted a team from Boston that featured Baseball Hall of Famer George Wright at shortstop. After the season, Cory published an extended ode to the Hyannis ballclub in the style of Ernest Thayer's Casey at the Bat.

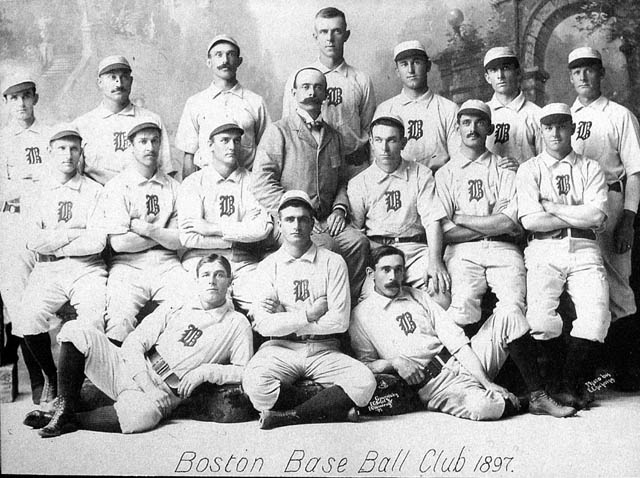
1909 Hyannis pitcher Fred Klobedanz (back row, third from right) was an ace hurler for the major league Boston Beaneaters in 1897 and 1898.

The Hyannis town team had its share of stars during the early years of the twentieth century. In 1909, former major leaguer Fred Klobedanz pitched for Hyannis. Klobedanz had pitched several seasons with the National League Boston Beaneaters, posting a 26–7 record in 1897 and a 19–10 record in the team's 1898 pennant-winning season. The 1909 Hyannis team also featured Princeton gridiron All-American Sanford White, and Brown University hurler Arthur Staff, who led the team as player-manager through much of the following decade. During this period, the Hyannis team periodically played squads from naval ships docked at or near Cape Cod. In 1909, 1,500 fans saw Hyannis turn a rare triple play in a victory over the team from the USS Missouri, and in 1911 and 1914, Hyannis played several games against the team from the USS Nebraska, billed as the "Base Ball Champions of the Atlantic Fleet."

Holy Cross star Ed Gill tossed no-hitters for Hyannis in 1916 and 1917, and in the latter did not allow a ball to be hit to the outfield. Gill went on to play in the major leagues for the Washington Senators. Cape Cod native Joel "Joe" Sherman of Yarmouth pitched for Hyannis for many seasons. As a young man, he had played for the team from 1906 to 1913. Then after a 14-year hiatus he returned to play again for Hyannis from 1927 to 1931. In between, Sherman had a brief stint in the majors with Connie Mack's Philadelphia Athletics in 1915. Sherman's long career with Hyannis, predating even the formation of the league itself in 1923, accounts for his being referred to by some as the "father of the [Cape] league."

==== The early Cape League era (1923–1939) ====
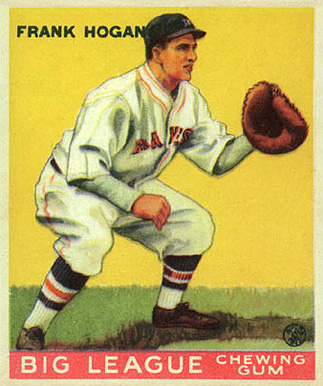
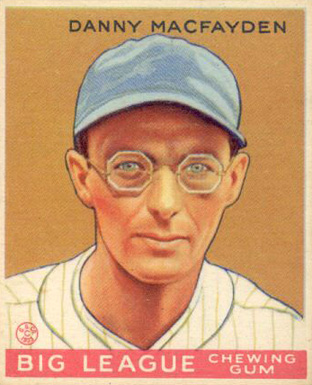
Frank "Shanty" Hogan and Danny MacFayden led Osterville to a CCBL championship in 1924. Hogan later played for the Boston Braves, and MacFayden for the Boston Red Sox. Osterville and Hyannis merged in 1931 to form a single Barnstable team.

In 1923 the Cape Cod Baseball League was formed and originally included Falmouth, Chatham, and two Barnstable teams: Osterville and Hyannis. Hyannis played home games at Hallett's Field on Main Street in downtown Hyannis, and Osterville played at West Bay Field in Osterville. After the 1930 season, the two teams merged into a combined "Barnstable" team, with home games being split between the two ballparks. Funding for town teams during this period was difficult to secure. Teams depended largely on the town itself to appropriate funds, and the impact of the Great Depression made this an especially difficult annual town decision. As a result, the Barnstable team was forced to withdraw from the Cape League for the 1938 season, but was back in 1939, though the league itself folded after that season.

The town's teams had great success in the early Cape League, winning a combined seven league championships during the 17-year duration of the league. The Osterville team won the title in 1924 and 1925. Osterville and Hyannis agreed to share the title in 1926, as weather and the departure of college players for school prevented the scheduling of a decisive game. Hyannis took the title in 1927, and Osterville was back on top in 1928. The combined Barnstable team was league champion in 1934 and 1937. The Barnstable teams of this era were replete with college stars and semi-pro players, many of whom went on to major league careers.

Hyannis boasted a "parade of sluggers" that included Georgetown University football star Tony Plansky, who went on to play for the NFL's New York Giants. In 1999, Plansky was ranked by Sports Illustrated as the #25 all-time greatest sports figure from Massachusetts. He was inducted into the CCBL Hall of Fame in 2001. Other Hyannis sluggers included NYU's Ken Strong, another collegiate football star who went on to a long NFL career and is a member of the Pro Football Hall of Fame. Brockton, Massachusetts native and Boston College shortstop Freddie Moncewicz played for Hyannis between 1923 and 1927, winning the league title as player-manager in 1926 and 1927, then played for the Boston Red Sox in 1928, and returned to his post as Hyannis player-manager in 1929. Newburyport, Massachusetts native Paddy Creeden joined Hyannis while still a student at Brockton High School in 1924. He played for Hyannis again from 1926 to 1930, and was described as a "very smart ball player, especially fast on his feet and one of the league's leading base stealers." After a brief stint with the Boston Red Sox early in 1931, Creeden returned to play with Barnstable for the remainder of that season. During this era, Hyannis played periodic exhibitions against well-known barnstorming teams such as the House of David, who defeated Hyannis in a 1927 contest, the Lizzie Murphy All-Stars, whom Hyannis defeated in 1930, and the Philadelphia Giants, who played Hyannis in 1926, 1928 and 1929, and featured the celebrated battery of Will "Cannonball" Jackman and Burlin White. In 1929, Hyannisport summer resident and ex-Boston mayor John F. "Honey Fitz" Fitzgerald performed his well-known rendition of Sweet Adeline at a benefit concert for the Hyannis baseball team.

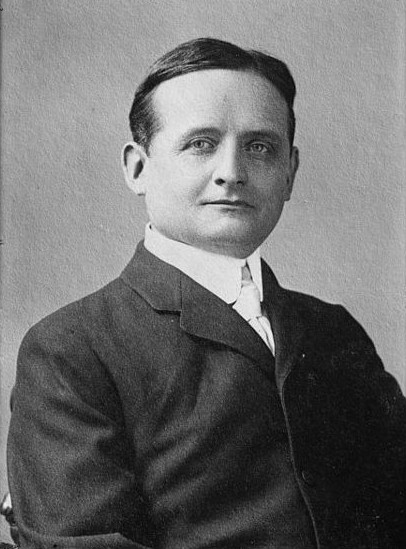
JFK granddad "Honey Fitz" sang Sweet Adeline at a 1929 benefit concert for the Hyannis ballclub.

Osterville's 1924 pennant winners featured Shanty Hogan and Danny "Deacon" MacFayden, a Cape Cod native from Truro. The pair had been teammates at Somerville High School, and led Osterville to the 1924 Cape League title. Hogan batted .385 on the season, was named team MVP, and reportedly smashed the "longest home run ever seen" at West Bay Field. He went on to enjoy a 13-year major league career, much of it with the hometown Boston Braves. MacFayden began his major league career in 1926 with the Boston Red Sox, and pitched for a total of 17 years in the major leagues, winning a World Series title with the New York Yankees in 1932. MacFayden was inducted into the CCBL Hall of Fame in 2012. The 1925 CCBL champion Osterville squad featured CCBL Hall of Famer Pat Sorenti, Boston College center fielder Tony Comerford, and second baseman Art Merewether, who had played briefly for the Pittsburgh Pirates. The 1929 Osterville team featured Lynn, Massachusetts native John "Blondy" Ryan, who went on to play for the World Series-winning 1933 New York Giants, Vito Tamulis, who went on to play for the Yankees and Brooklyn Dodgers, and former Dartmouth College football and ice hockey standout Myles Lane. Lane had just completed his rookie season in the National Hockey League, a defenseman for the 1929 Stanley Cup champion Boston Bruins, and played for Osterville through 1931. He went on to a career in law, becoming a New York Supreme Court justice.

When the Hyannis and Osterville teams combined in 1931, the new team was led by player-manager Danny Silva, who had filled the same role for Osterville the previous season. Silva had played briefly for the Washington Senators in 1919, and after his playing days became a longtime umpire in the CCBL. In the early 1960s when a knowledgeable and universally respected figure was needed to unify the newly-reorganized Cape League, Silva was chosen and served as the first commissioner of the league's modern era, a position he held from 1962 to 1968. Silva was inducted into the CCBL Hall of Fame as part of its inaugural class of 2000.

From 1933 to 1937, Barnstable was led by player-manager Ed "Pete" Herman, a pitcher from Boston College who had played previously in the league for Chatham. Herman began the 1933 season with an 18-game hitting streak, and later that season proved himself the team's iron man by pitching both halves of a doubleheader. Herman led the club to league championships in 1934 and 1937, and in 1938 it was reported that, "When it comes to picking an All-Cape, All-Time, Cape Cod League manager, 'Pete' will win the nomination hands down."

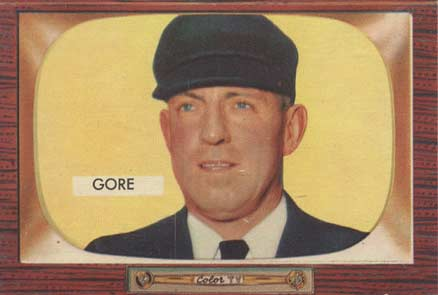
Artie Gore was a flashy infielder for Barnstable in 1934, and went on to a ten-year umpiring career in the National League.

Herman had brought several players with him from the Chatham team, including infielder Artie Gore and catcher George Colbert. Gore was a crowd favorite, known for his "chatter, pepper, and flashy fielding," he went on to enjoy a ten-year umpiring career in the National League. Colbert, a popular power-hitter, had been Herman's batterymate at Boston College. Described as "loud and humorous", Colbert kept the team loose with entertaining antics such as catching slow pitchers barehanded.

Herman's clubs also featured several future major leaguers. Boston College pitcher Ed Gallagher twirled for Barnstable in 1931, then played for the Boston Red Sox in 1932, and returned to play for Barnstable again in 1933. Another 1933 Barnstable hurler, Emil "Bud" Roy, went on to play briefly for the Philadelphia Athletics. Quincy, Massachusetts native Ted Olson was a dominant pitcher for Barnstable in 1934 and 1935, and went on to play for the Boston Red Sox. CCBL Hall of Famer Lennie Merullo also played for Barnstable in 1935, and went on to play seven seasons with the Chicago Cubs.

Barnstable's 1937 league title was won in exciting fashion as ace pitcher Norman Merrill tossed a no-hitter to beat Bourne, 5–0, on the final day of the season to clinch the league title. The win capped a stellar season for Merrill, who won 13 games for Barnstable while batting .394. The powerful team had seven players who batted over .300, and also featured burly slugger John Spirida, who went on to play pro football for the Washington Redskins in 1939. In 1939, the final year of the early Cape League, night baseball was introduced for the first time. Portable lights were staged for Barnstable's game against Falmouth at Falmouth Heights, and the following night the lights were transported to Hyannis for the second game of the home-and-home series between the two clubs.

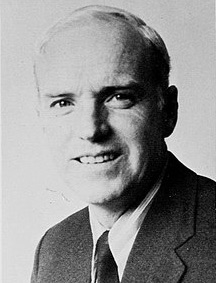
Massachusetts State Senator and CCBL Hall of Famer Jack Aylmer played in the league for the Barnstable Barons in the 1950s, and brought an expansion franchise to Hyannis in 1976

==== The Upper and Lower Cape League era (1946–1962) ====
The Cape League was revived after World War II, and was originally composed of 11 teams across Upper Cape and Lower Cape divisions. Barnstable's entry in the 1946 Lower Cape Division was known as the Barnstable Townies and played at the Barnstable High School field in Hyannis. The team moved to the Upper Cape Division in 1947 where it competed against Barnstable's other newly-formed Cape League team from the village of Cotuit. Osterville, who had merged with Hyannis to form the Barnstable team in 1931, entered its own team in the league in 1948, but only played through the 1950 season.

Early on, the Townies were not a particularly strong team. The team was reportedly not well-managed, and favored veteran players over younger but more talented ones. After much debate regarding sponsorship and naming, the team was rejuvenated under the new moniker Barnstable Barons, and found itself among the top teams in the league in 1951 and 1952, but in June 1952 impulsively withdrew from the league after a disputed forfeit ruling. The Barnstable team was reorganized in 1955 under the old nickname "Townies", but this iteration only lasted two seasons. After another two seasons without a team in the league, Barnstable put forward a new team for the 1959 season, dubbed the Barnstable Red Sox.

=== Modern era (1963–present) ===
The Cape League was reorganized in 1963 and became officially sanctioned by the NCAA as a collegiate league. This marked the beginning of the league's "modern era". The Barnstable Red Sox had played in the Cape League from 1959 to 1962, but were not part of the newly-reorganized league in 1963. However, after the league's Bourne Canalmen dropped out of the league following the 1972 season, the number of teams in the league was reduced to an uneven seven, and an opportunity was perceived by then state senator and CCBL Hall of Famer John "Jack" Aylmer. A Barnstable native and member of the 1952 Barnstable Barons, Aylmer became the driving force of a movement to bring an expansion team to Hyannis. In 1976 the new team began play in the CCBL as the Hyannis Mets, so named in the hope that the team might enlist financial assistance from the New York Mets, which was not forthcoming.

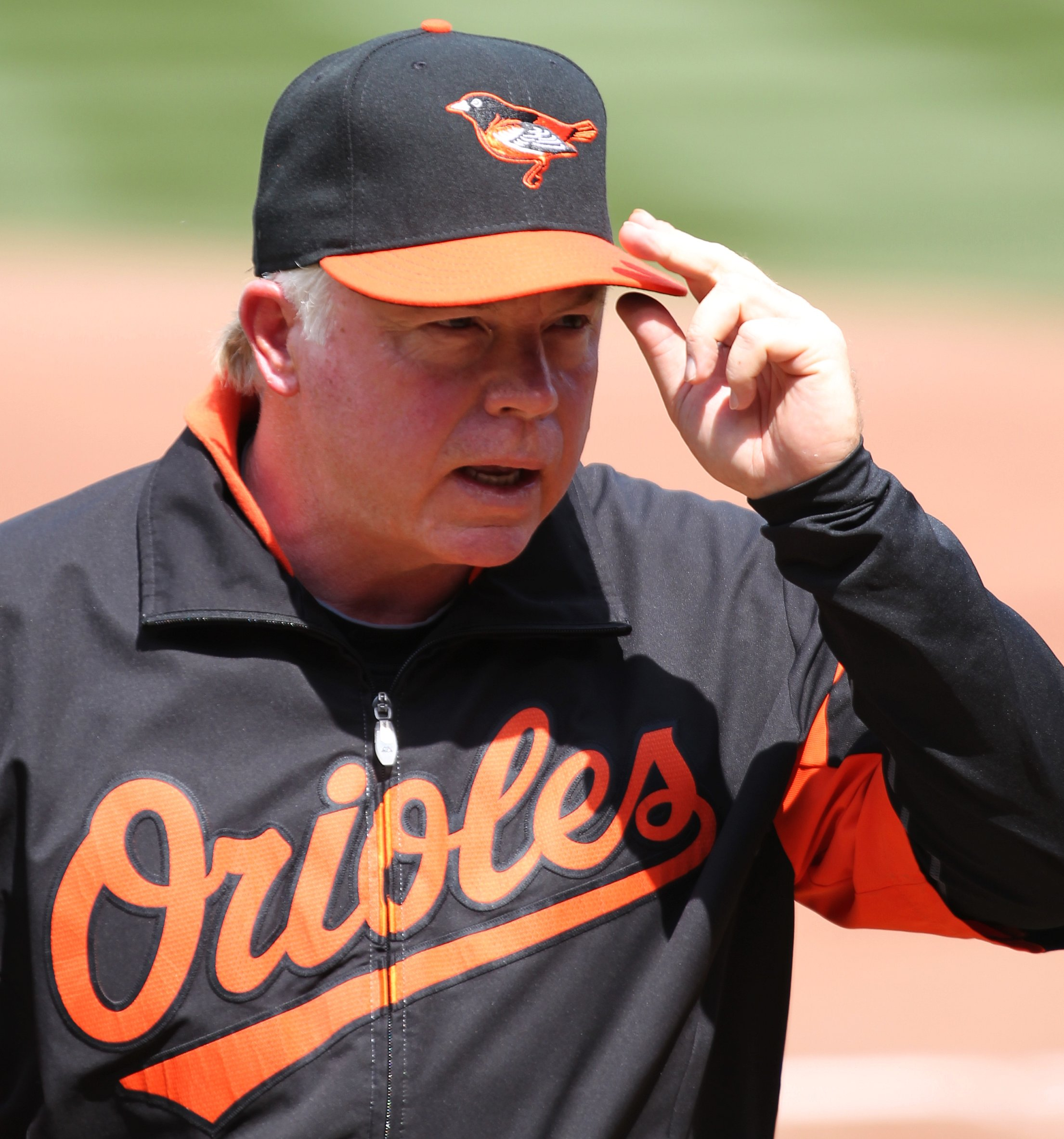
CCBL Hall of Famer Nat "Buck" Showalter was league MVP for the inaugural Hyannis Mets team in 1976.

==== 1976: The Mets' inaugural season ====
In its inaugural season, the new Hyannis franchise played its home games at Barnstable High School, and was skippered by Ben Hays, who had previously managed in the league with Chatham. The Mets finished the regular season in fourth place in the eight-team league and posted a winning record, enough to qualify them for the playoffs where they were subsequently ousted by Chatham. The 1976 team included future major leaguers Ross Baumgarten and CCBL Hall of Famer Nat "Buck" Showalter, who launched the Mets' season by going 4 for 4 with a home run and 6 RBI in the team's opening day 17–5 victory over Falmouth. Showalter went on to bat a whopping .434 for the season and was named the 1976 CCBL MVP.

==== Back-to-back championships to close the 1970s ====
In only their third year in the league, the Mets finished the 1978 season with a 31–11 record, the best in the league. Managed by CCBL Hall of Famer Bob Schaefer, who had played and managed in the league with Sagamore and Bourne, the team was powered by three CCBL Hall of Fame players: pitcher Dennis Long, Holy Cross standout Ron Perry Jr., and slugging catcher Bill Schroeder, who belted 15 home runs for the Mets and was named the league's MVP and Outstanding Pro Prospect. The Mets faced Orleans in the semifinal playoffs, and took Game 1 at home. The Mets jumped out early in Game 2 at Eldredge Park on first-inning long balls by Schroeder and Jim Watkins. Watkins blasted another one in the eighth, and drove in six RBIs in the Mets' 10–7 series-clinching win. Hyannis moved on to meet Harwich in the best-of-five championship series. In Game 1 at home, the Mets found themselves down 6–1 early, but exploded behind two homers from Bob Teegarden, storming back for a 15–6 win. Teegarden launched another one in Game 2, and Pete Filson pitched a gem in the Mets' 6–1 win. The Mariners refused to roll over, however, taking Game 3 at Hyannis, 5–2. In Game 4, Jeff Twitty allowed two Mariner runs in the first, but settled down and didn't allow another run, going the distance in a 4–2 Hyannis victory that earned the Mets their first CCBL crown.

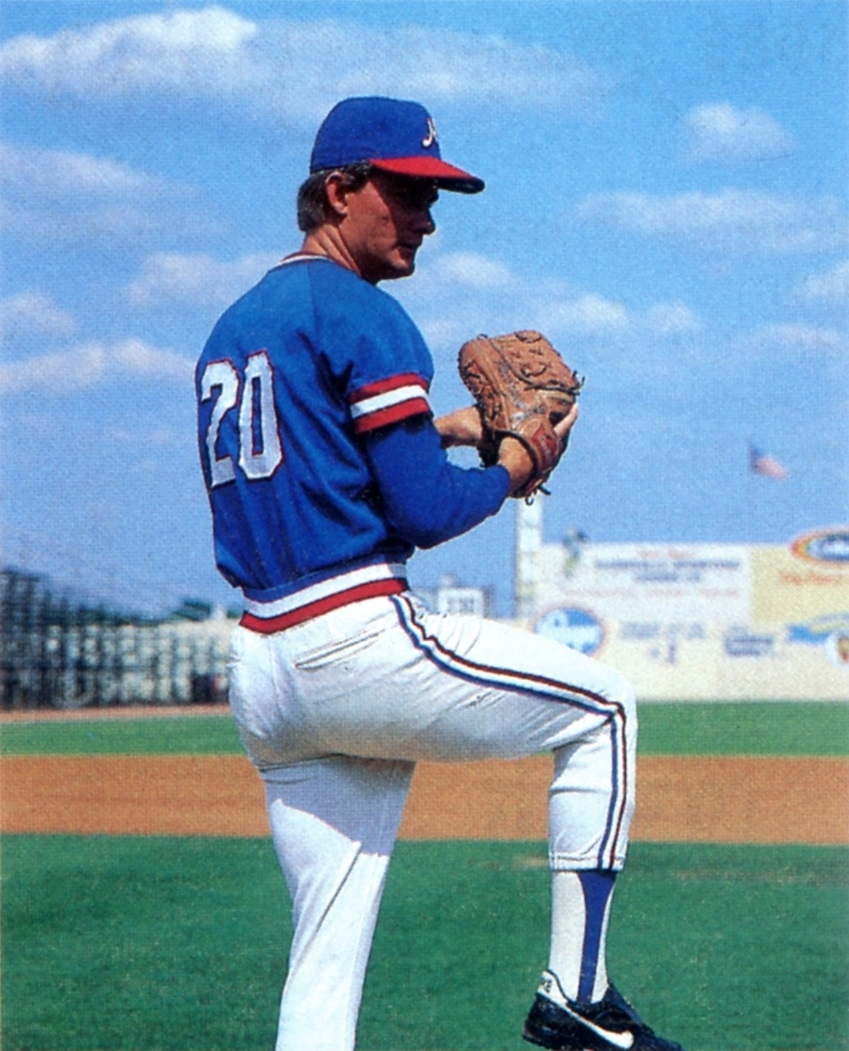
Ed Olwine won back-to-back CCBL titles with Hyannis in 1978 and 1979.

Schaefer's squad repeated the feat in 1979 with an even more impressive 33-win regular season, and a second championship victory over Harwich. 1979 was the team's first season of play in the newly-reconstructed McKeon Park. The team returned CCBL Hall of Famers Long and Perry, and featured yet another CCBL Hall of Famer in outfielder Ross Jones. Long posted an impressive 8–1 record for the Mets. League MVP Perry batted .401 for the regular season, but lost the batting title to Jones, who batted .413 and was named the league's Outstanding Pro Prospect. In the semi-final playoffs against Chatham, Hyannis sent Long to the mound for Game 1 at home, coming away with a 6–2 win. Game 2 at Veterans Field was closely contested until the Mets pushed across four runs in the ninth to take the series with an 8–4 victory.

Facing Harwich in the title series for a second consecutive season, the Mets dropped a slugfest in Game 1, 12–10. Game 2 was a 12–2 Hyannis rout of the Mariners. Games 3 and 4 were played as a home-and-home doubleheader. The Mets took the afternoon front end at home, 12–6. In the nightcap at Whitehouse Field, Hyannis jumped out to a 5–0 lead in the top of the first, but when the Mariners scored two of their own in the bottom of the opening frame, the Mets brought in all-star reliever Ed Olwine for some long relief. Olwine had tossed two and two-thirds innings of relief in the Game 3 afternoon tilt, and proceeded to finish out Game 4, throwing an additional eight and one-third masterful innings in the Mets' 7–3 championship-clinching win.

Bob Schaefer stepped down from the Mets after the 1979 season, but his combined regular-season record of 64–18–1—paired with two league championships in just two seasons with Hyannis—stands among the most remarkable managerial achievements in CCBL history.

==== The 1980s ====
The Mets made the playoffs five times in the 1980s, reaching the championship series twice, but coming up short both times. The 1980 Mets boasted league batting champ and CCBL Hall of Famer Brick Smith, who hit at a .391 clip. With a club that included future major league player and Boston Red Sox manager John Farrell, the 1982 Mets reached the title series but were swept by Chatham.

In 1987, Hyannis was led by a pair of CCBL Hall of Famers in pitcher Pat Hope and future major league all-star Robin Ventura. Hope set a league record with 11 victories, and hurled a perfect game against Wareham, while Ventura batted .370 and was the league's Outstanding Pro Prospect. The 1987 team also included slugger Albert "Joey" Belle, who went on to hit 381 major league home runs. The 1989 Mets were skippered by CCBL Hall of Famer Ed Lyons, and featured league Outstanding Pro Prospect and future Philadelphia Phillies all-star pitcher Tyler Green, but the club was again swept in the title series, this time by Y-D.

==== The 1990s and another title ====
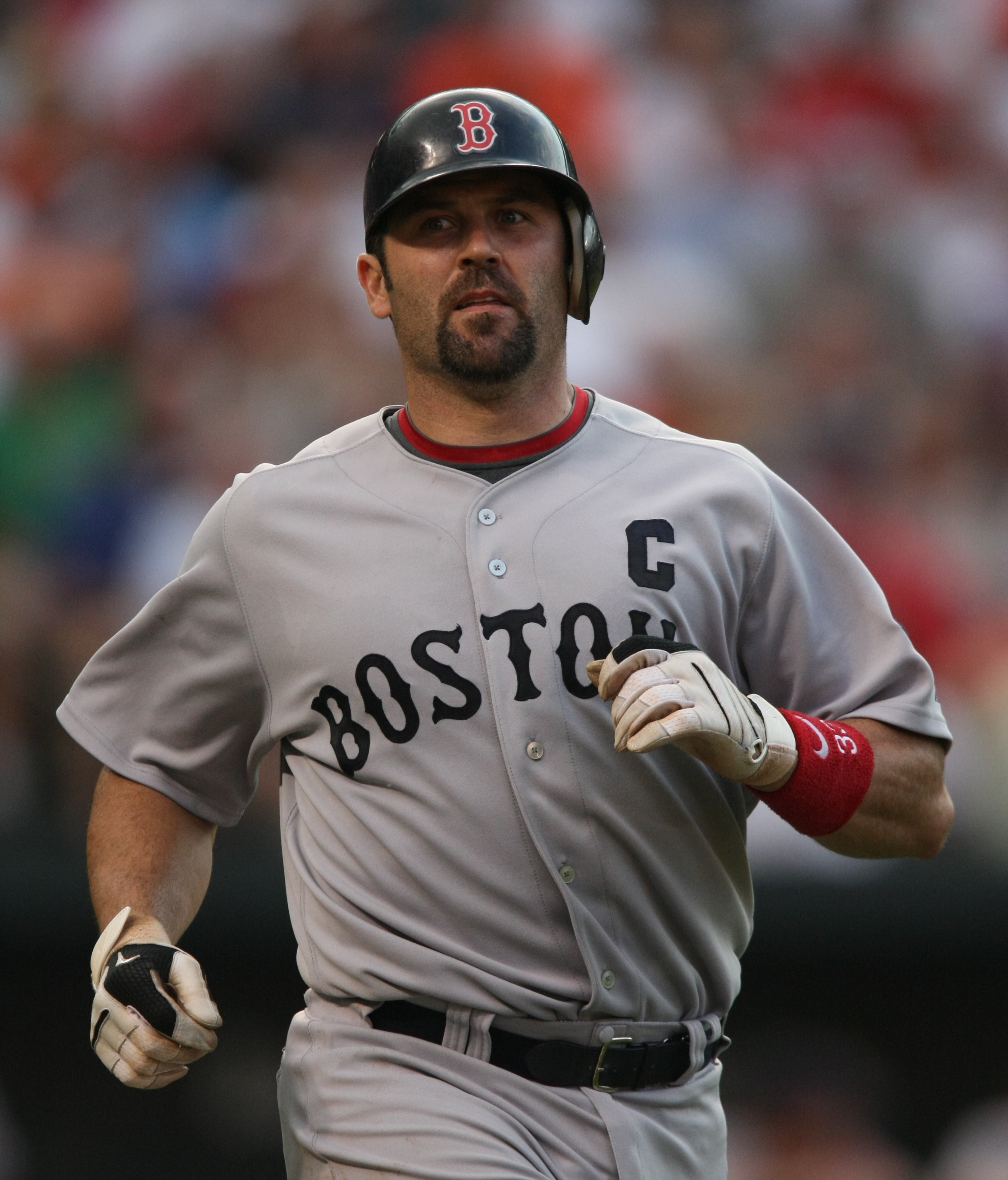
CCBL Hall of Famer Jason Varitek played with Hyannis in 1991 and 1993. He won a league title in 1991 and was CCBL MVP in 1993.

Hyannis once again claimed the Cape League title in 1991, with a team that included future major leaguers Rich Aurilia and Boston Red Sox captain Jason Varitek. In the playoff semi-finals against Wareham, Varitek caught a no-hitter tossed by the Mets' Richard King. The Mets matched up against Chatham in the championship series. In Game 1 at McKeon Park, Southern Illinois University hurler Mike Van Gilder tossed 8 1/3 stellar innings for Hyannis, and University of Miami pinch-hitter Juan Llanes poked an RBI single with two outs in the ninth to give the Mets the walkoff win. Don Wengert was strong on the mound for the Mets in Game 2 at Chatham, and Hyannis got two-run blasts from Greg Shockey in the first and Matt Luke in the sixth to win 5–2 and complete the series sweep and claim a third CCBL crown. Chad McConnell took home playoff MVP honors.

In 1993, Varitek returned to Hyannis from the 1991 title team and was named league MVP, winning the 1993 batting crown with a .371 average, and catching another no-hitter for Hyannis, this one thrown by future St. Louis Cardinals all-star Matt Morris. Varitek was inducted into the CCBL Hall of Fame in 2002.

After an all-star 1994 season for the Mets in which he tied the league record for doubles in a season (19), Indiana State University standout Dan Olson returned for another all-star campaign in Hyannis in 1995. He owned the night at the '95 mid-summer CCBL classic, claiming the All-Star Game Home Run Derby crown, then going 3-for-4 and taking home MVP honors in the West Division's 4–0 All-Star Game shutout victory.

==== The 2000s and the birth of the Harbor Hawks ====
Hyannis qualified for the postseason three times and reached the CCBL championship series once in the 2000s, being swept in 2000 by Brewster. The 2000 season saw internationally-acclaimed recording star and Martha's Vineyard resident Carly Simon on hand at McKeon Park to toss out the first pitch and take in a few innings of the Mets' July 11 game with Brewster.

From 2002 through 2005, the Mets played an annual regular season home game at Tom Nevers Field in Nantucket, in what was billed as the "Nantucket Pennant" game. Falmouth won the 2002 Nantucket game, but the Mets avenged the loss by defeating the Commodores in the 2003 island rematch. Hyannis defeated Y-D, 9–7, in the 2004 event, but lost to Harwich, 9–3, in 2005. Also from 2002 to 2005, the Mets played an annual regular season home game at Fenton Field in Sandwich, Massachusetts, an event honoring the part Sandwich played in the early history of baseball on Cape Cod. Over the four-year span, the event saw the Mets play host to each of their four West Division CCBL rivals.

The Mets' 2003 team featured CCBL Hall of Famer Sam Fuld, a speedy center fielder and future major leaguer who batted .361 for the Mets. Charlie Furbush of South Portland, Maine twirled for Hyannis in 2005 and 2006. He was named the league's Outstanding New England Player in 2006, posting a 1.83 ERA in 54 innings, tossing a no-hitter against Bourne, and being named the West Division All-Star Game starter. Hyannis boasted the league's top batsman in 2006 in Matt Mangini, who led the league with a .310 average, and was West Division starting third baseman in the All-Star Game. University of Hawaii hurler Matt Daly provided the highlight of the 2007 season with a no-hitter against Wareham at McKeon Park. Mets Slugger Chris Dominguez crushed three home runs in a single game in 2008, the first CCBL player to accomplish the feat since Baseball Hall of Famer Frank Thomas did it for Orleans twenty years earlier.

In late 2008, Major League Baseball announced that it would enforce its trademarks, and required those CCBL teams who shared a nickname with an MLB team to either change their nicknames or buy their uniforms and merchandise only through MLB-licensed vendors. In 2009, two CCBL teams, Orleans and Chatham proceeded to change their nicknames. In 2010, Hyannis followed suit and became the Hyannis Harbor Hawks, the name an homage to the ospreys, or "fish hawks" who routinely nest atop the light stanchions at McKeon Park.

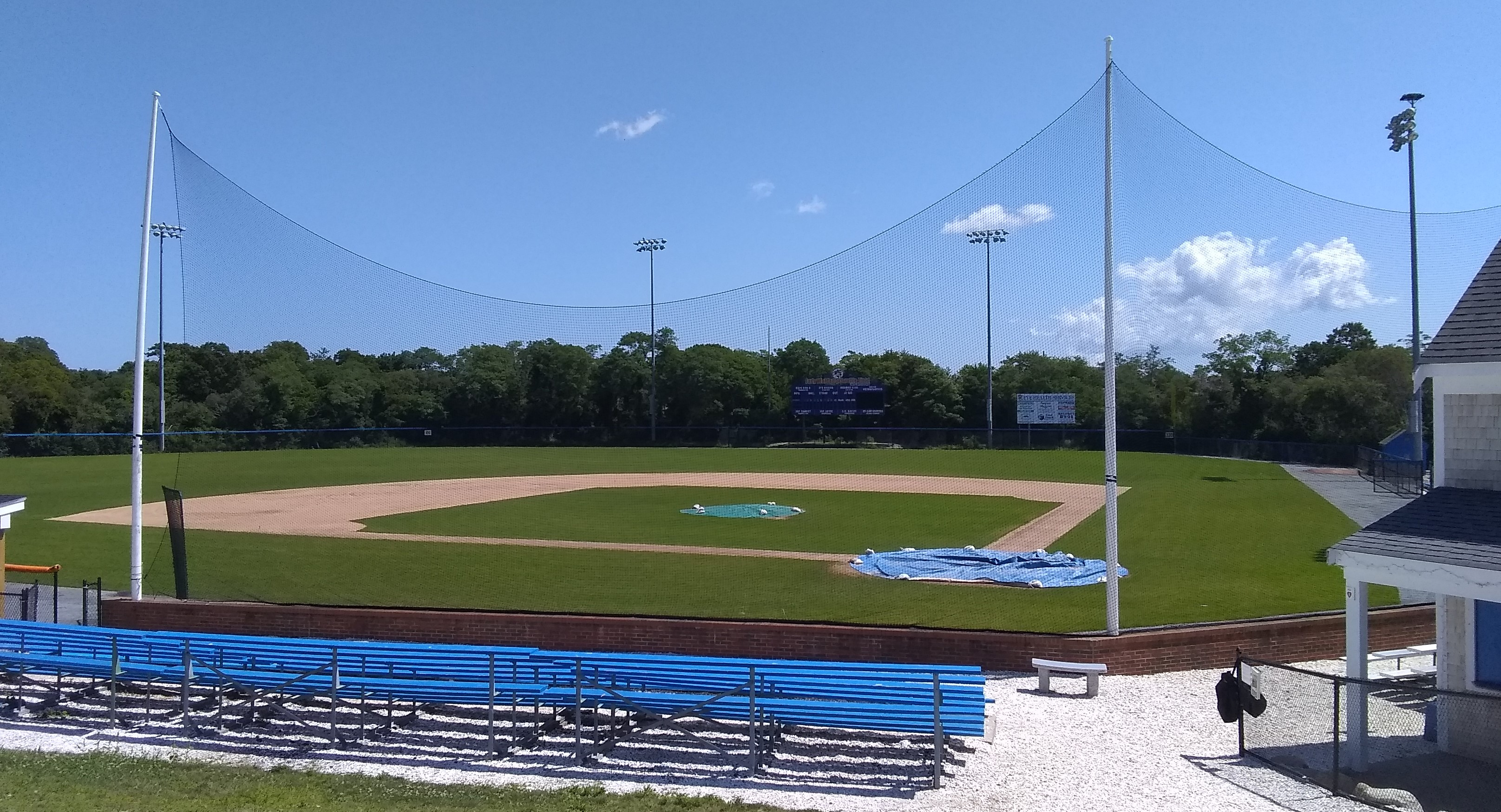
Judy Walden Scarafile Field at McKeon Park, home of the Harbor Hawks. An osprey nest may be detected atop the first base light stanchion.

==== The 2010s and the Gassman era ====
The Harbor Hawks were skippered throughout the 2010s by Judson University coach Chad Gassman, who took the Hyannis post in 2009 after serving as pitching coach the prior season. Under Gassman, Hyannis qualified for postseason play six times in the 2010s, but reached the championship series only once.

The 2012 Harbor Hawks team featured the league's Outstanding Pitcher and Outstanding Pro Prospect, Sean Manaea. Manaea went on to play in the major leagues for the Oakland A's, throwing a no-hitter against the Boston Red Sox in 2018. The Harbor Hawks boasted the league's Outstanding Pro Prospect for a second consecutive year as Jeff Hoffman won the 2013 award. Harbor Hawk switch-pitching phenom Ryan Perez made national headlines hurling from both sides in the 2014 CCBL All-Star Game, and earning the game's West Division MVP Award.

In 2015, Gassman's club finished in first place atop the West Division and was led by a trio of top moundsmen. Aaron Civale posted an 0.36 ERA with five saves in 25 innings, Dakota Hudson hurled 42.2 innings with a 1.68 ERA and 41 strikeouts, and Devin Smeltzer, the West Division All-Star Game co-MVP, threw a nine-inning no-hitter against Harwich in which he missed a perfect game by a single walk. In the playoffs, the Hawks defeated Cotuit in the first-round series, then shut down Bourne in the West finals to reach the league championship series, where the Harbor Hawks were defeated two games to one by Y-D.

In 2016, the Harbor Hawks named the baseball field at McKeon Park in honor of longtime CCBL president Judy Walden Scarafile. Harbor Hawks took home top honors at the 2016 CCBL All-Star Game, as slugger Kameron Esthay claimed the pre-game home run derby crown, and shortstop Zach Rutherford went 3-for-3 with a homer and two RBIs on his way to being named West Division game MVP. The 2018 Harbor Hawks featured league MVP and batting champion Matthew Barefoot, who finished the season with a .379 mark. After the 2019 season, Gassman, the longest-tenured manager in team history, announced he would not be returning after 11 seasons with Hyannis.

==== The 2020s ====
The 2020 CCBL season was cancelled due to the coronavirus pandemic. 2021 saw Michigan's Clark Elliott claim the league batting crown for Hyannis with a .344 average. CCBL Hall of Famer Eric Beattie, who pitched in the league for Bourne in 2003, took the helm as Harbor Hawks skipper in 2022, and promptly earned the league's Manager of the Year award in his first season. Led by the league's 10th Player award winner Rikuu Nishida and Outstanding New England Player Jordy Allard, Beattie's 2022 Hawks notched a first-round playoff series victory and an appearance in the West Division finals for the first time since 2015. Hyannis returned to the West Division finals in 2023, led by the league's Outstanding Pro Prospect Cam Smith. Fresno City College skipper Mitch Karraker took over managerial duties in 2024.

== CCBL Hall of Fame inductees ==
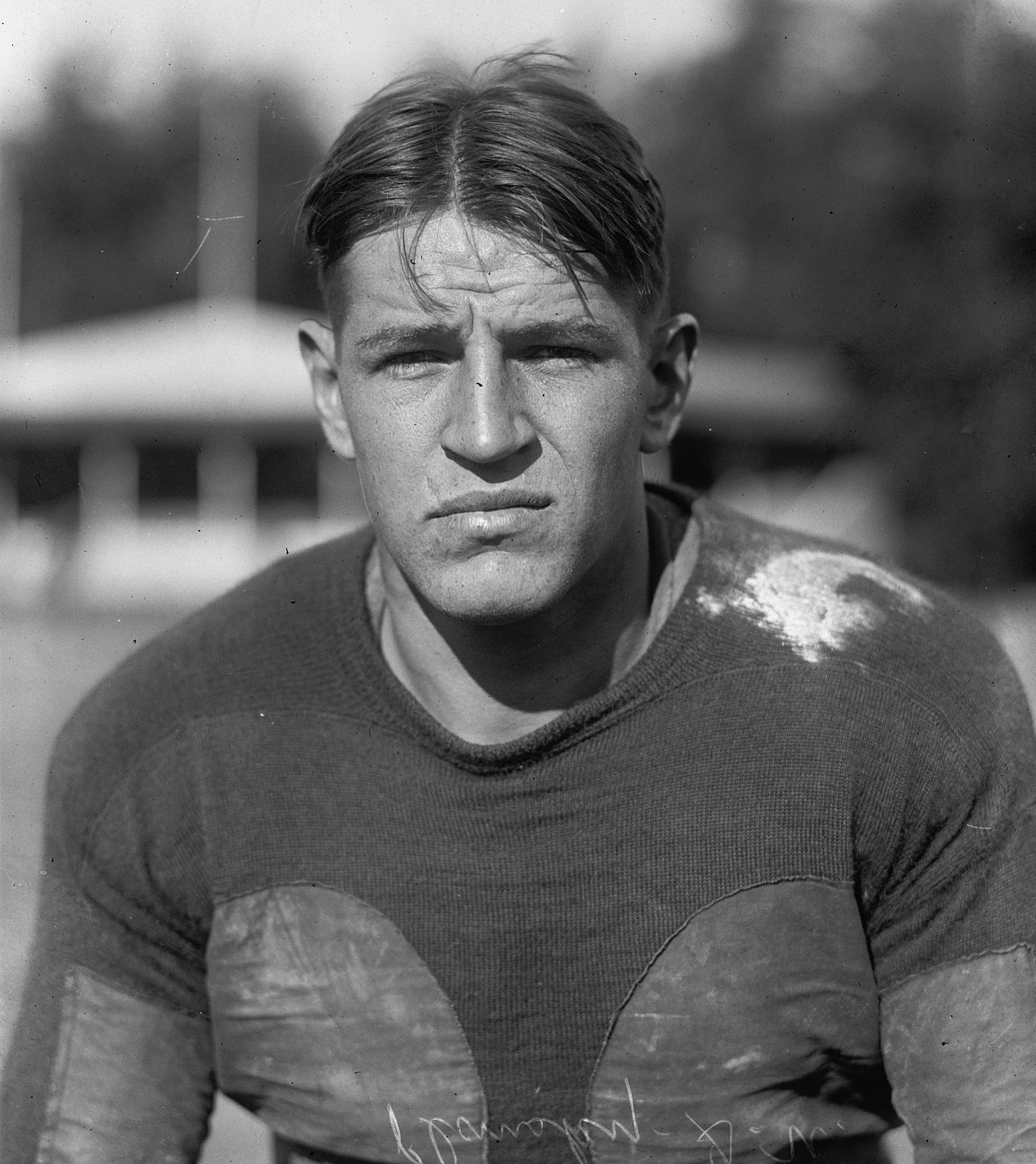
Georgetown and NFL fullback and CCBL Hall of Famer Tony Plansky played for Hyannis in 1928 and 1929

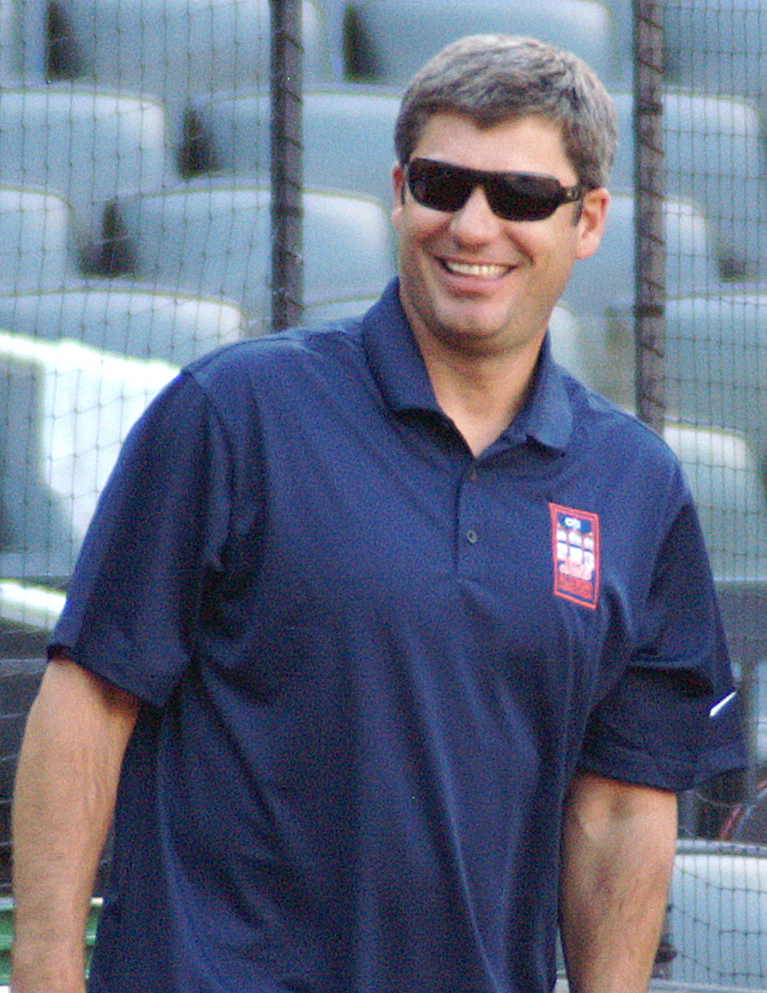
CCBL Hall of Famer Robin Ventura

The CCBL Hall of Fame and Museum is a history museum and hall of fame honoring past players, coaches, and others who have made outstanding contributions to the CCBL. Below are the inductees who spent all or part of their time in the Cape League with Hyannis.

Year Inducted	Ref.	Name	Position
2000		Danny Silva	Player / Manager
2000		Lennie Merullo	Player
2000		Ed Lyons	Manager
2001		Tony Plansky	Player
2001		Robin Ventura	Player
2002		Buck Showalter	Player
2002		Jason Varitek	Player
2002		Cal Burlingame	Player
2003		Ron Perry Jr.	Player
2004		Pat Hope	Player
2006		Ross Jones	Player
2007		Scott Hemond	Player
2007		Bob Schaefer	Manager
2009		Bill Schroeder	Player
2012		John "Jack" Aylmer	Player / Executive
2012		Danny “Deacon” MacFayden	Player
2014		Sam Fuld	Player
2014		Eric Beattie	Manager
2017		Dennis Long	Player
2024		Brick Smith	Player

== Notable alumni ==
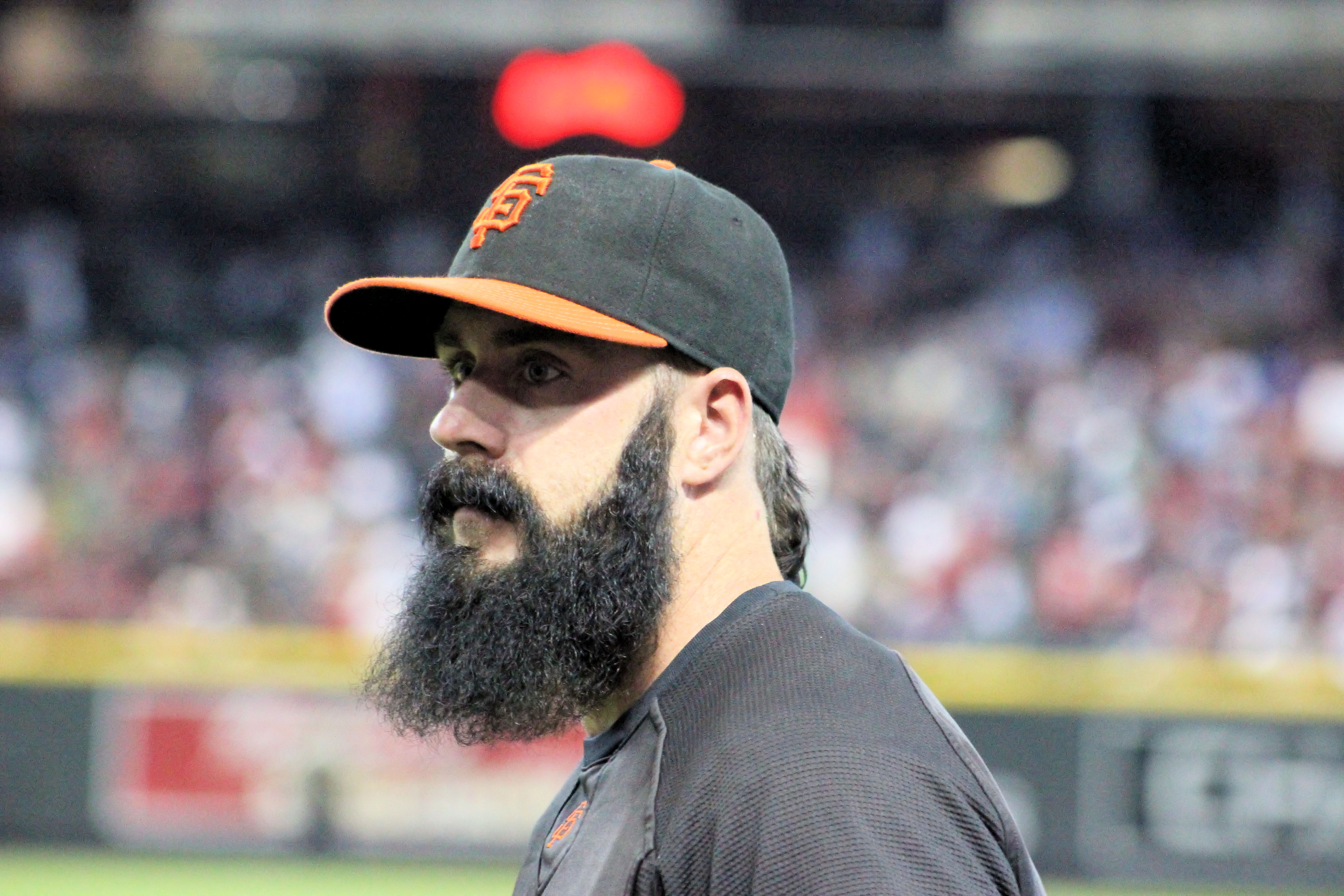
Brian Wilson

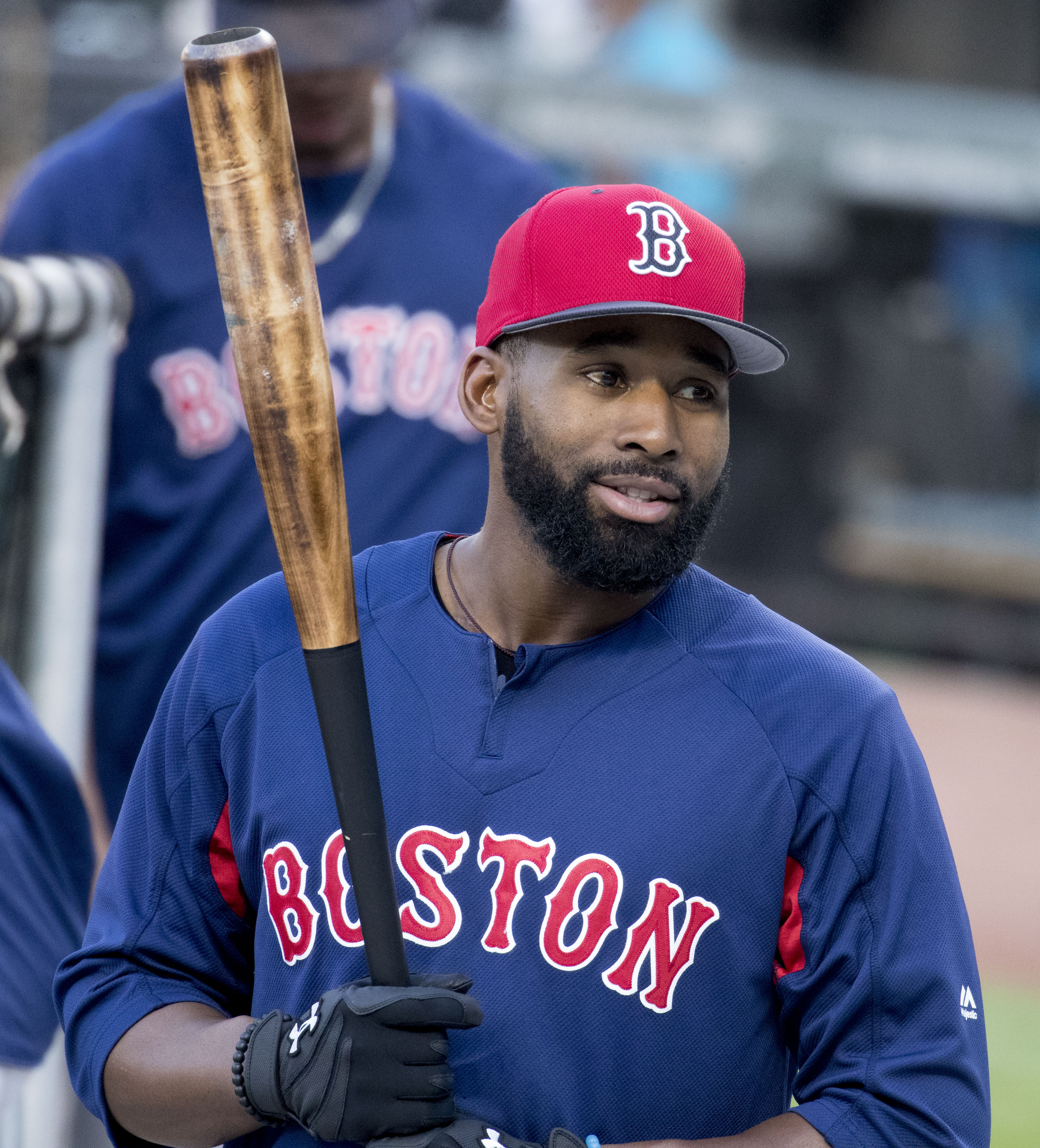
Jackie Bradley Jr.

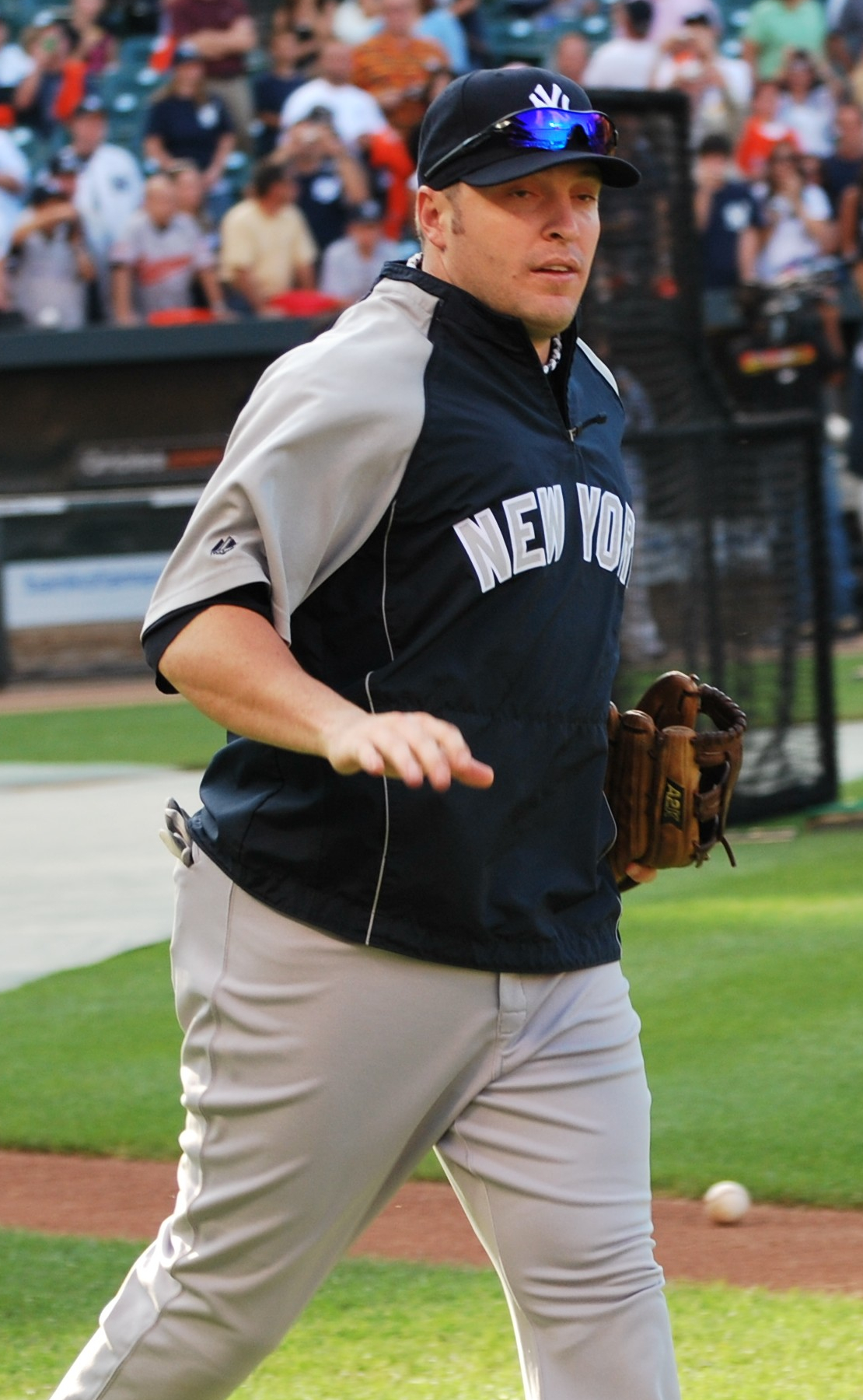
Eric Hinske

- Austin Adams 2008
- Jeff Alkire 1991
- Billy Amick 2023
- Brian Anderson 2013
- Jamie Arnold 2023
- Rich Aurilia 1991
- John Axford 2002
- Jack Aylmer 1952
- Myles Bailey 2025
- Charlie Barnes 2016
- Kimera Bartee 1992
- Adam Bass 2002
- Jackson Baumeister 2022
- Ross Baumgarten 1976
- Mike Baxter 2004–2005
- Albert Belle 1987
- Kris Benson 1994
- Corey Bird 2015
- Nolan Blackwood 2015
- Casey Blake 1996
- Jaime Bluma 1992
- Jackie Bradley Jr. 2009
- Rod Brewer 1986
- Greg Briley 1985
- Brian Buchanan 1994
- Jeromy Burnitz 1988
- Pat Burrell 1996
- Thomas Burrows 2015
- Matt Buschmann 2004
- Mike Bynum 1997–1998
- Eric Byrnes 1996–1997
- Matt Carson 2000
- Curt Casali 2008
- Randy Choate 1996
- Aaron Civale 2015
- John Cohen 1989
- Josh Collmenter 2006
- Tony Comerford 1925–1926
- Dick Conway 1888
- Charles B. Cory 1888–1892
- Mike Costanzo 2004
- Charles Richard Crane 1888–1892
- Pat Creeden 1924–1931
- James Darnell 2006–2007
- Bob Davidson 1983
- Jarret DeHart 2014
- Ben DeLuzio 2014–2015
- Sean DePaula 1995
- Matt Dermody 2010–2011
- Donnie Dewees 2014
- Hunter Dietz 2025
- Brent Dlugach 2003
- Chris Dominguez 2008
- Brendan Donovan 2017
- Harry Downes 1933
- Kirk Dressendorfer 1988
- Jake Dunning 2009
- Dave Elder 1996
- Dietrich Enns 2011
- Jorge Fábregas 1990
- Peter Fairbanks 2013–2014
- Monty Fariss 1987
- John Farrell 1982
- Mitch Farris 2023
- Pete Filson 1977–1978
- Joseph Fitzgerald 1926
- Ryan Flaherty 2006
- Dylan Floro 2011
- Josh Fogg 1996
- Tyler Frank 2017
- Kyle Freeland 2013
- Sam Fuld 2003
- Charlie Furbush 2005–2006
- Ed Gallagher 1931, 1933
- Ryan Garko 2001–2002
- Mitch Garver 2012
- Brent Gates 1991
- Ian Gibaut 2014
- Lucas Gilbreath 2016
- Ed Gill 1917
- Barney Gilligan 1889
- Mike Glavine 1994
- Ross Gload 1995–1996
- Hunter Goodman 2019
- Don Gordon 1981
- Artie Gore 1934
- Tyler Green 1989
- Kip Gross 1985
- Mert Hackett 1888–1891
- Sam Haggerty 2014
- Frank Hallowell 1893
- Seth Halvorsen 2021
- Brendan Harris 2000–2001
- Joe Harvey 2013
- Curt Hasler 1985
- Austin Hays 2015
- Scott Hemond 1984
- Eric Hinske 1997
- Jim Hoey 2001
- Jeff Hoffman 2012–2013
- Shanty Hogan 1924
- Gavin Hollowell 2018
- Steve Holm 2000
- Brian Horwitz 2002
- Dakota Hudson 2015
- Ryan Jackson 2007
- Zach Jackson 2003
- Mitch Jebb 2022
- Chris Jelic 1984
- Eddie Jeremiah 1930
- Chris Johnson 2005
- Ross Jones 1979
- Scott Jordan 1984
- Edouard Julien 2019
- Mike Kennedy 1989
- Mike King 2015
- Fred Klobedanz 1909
- Vahn Lackey 2025
- Jason Lane 1998
- Myles Lane 1929–1931
- Nate Lavender 2019
- Brett Laxton 1996
- Jeff Ledbetter 1980
- Alex Lodise 2024
- Carlton Loewer 1994
- Nick Loftin 2019
- Andrew Lorraine 1991–1992
- Donny Lucy 2002–2003
- Matt Luke 1991
- Danny MacFayden 1924
- Waddy MacPhee 1930
- Scotti Madison 1979
- Sean Manaea 2012
- Matt Mangini 2006
- Jake Mangum 2017
- Joe Martinez 2004
- Jamie McAndrew 1987
- Chad McConnell 1991
- Dinny McNamara 1929
- Art Merewether 1925
- Mark Merila 1992
- Lennie Merullo 1935
- Matt Mervis 2017
- Mike Metcalfe 1993
- JB Middleton 2023
- Matt Miller 1996
- Doug Mirabelli 1990
- Freddie Moncewicz 1923–1927, 1929, 1932–1933
- Christian Moore 2022
- Matt Morris 1993
- Kevin Morton 1988
- Jon Moscot 2011
- Robert Neustrom 2017
- Rikuu Nishida 2022
- Jake Noll 2015
- Ted Olson 1934–1935
- Ed Olwine 1978–1979
- Pedro Pages 2018
- Vinnie Pasquantino 2018
- Ben Paulsen 2008
- Ryan Pepiot 2018
- Jason Perry 2001
- Ron Perry 1978–1979
- D. J. Peterson 2012
- Shane Peterson 2007
- Tony Plansky 1928–1929
- Kevin Plawecki 2011
- Kevin Polcovich 1990
- Ford Proctor 2017
- Scott Proctor 1997–1998
- Danny Putnam 2002
- J. J. Putz 1998
- Mike Rabelo 2000
- Wes Rachels 1996
- Jon Ratliff 1992
- Colin Rea 2010
- Joey Rickard 2011
- Doug Robbins 1987
- Chris Robinson 2004
- Shane Robinson 2004
- Jake Rogers 2015
- Dan Rohrmeier 1986
- Seth Rosin 2009
- Emil "Bud" Roy 1933
- Blondy Ryan 1929
- Nick Sandlin 2017
- Jack Santora 1998
- Mac Sceroler 2016
- Jake Schaffner 2025
- Nolan Schanuel 2022
- Bill Schroeder 1978
- Joel "Joe" Sherman 1906–1913, 1927–1931
- Buck Showalter 1976
- Danny Silva 1928–1932
- Justin Simmons 2003
- Austin Slater 2013–2014
- Devin Smeltzer 2015
- Brick Smith 1979–1980
- Cam Smith 2023
- Mike Smith 1999
- Cy Sneed 2013
- Steve Soderstrom 1991
- Elliot Soto 2009
- John Spirida 1935–1937, 1939
- Eric Stamets 2011
- Ken Strong
- Vito Tamulis 1929
- Graham Taylor 2003–2004
- Will Taylor 2023
- Bryce Teodosio 2019
- Matt Thaiss 2015
- Ryan Thompson 2013
- Ashur Tolliver 2008
- Cal Towey 2011
- Jeff Twitty 1978
- John Valentin 1988
- Jason Varitek 1991, 1993
- Robin Ventura 1987
- Drew VerHagen 2010
- Zach Vincej 2011
- Joe Vitiello 1989–1990
- Adam Walker 2011
- John Wasdin 1992
- Ryan Weiss 2017
- Davis Wendzel 2018
- Don Wengert 1991
- Jordan Westburg 2019
- Sanford White 1909
- Steve Wilkerson 2012–2013
- Jackson Williams 2006
- Ben Williamson 2023
- Brian Wilson 2002
- Tyler Wilson 2009–2010
- Ed Wineapple 1928–1930
- Samuel Winslow 1884
- Nick Wittgren 2011
- Tracy Woodson 1983

== Yearly results ==
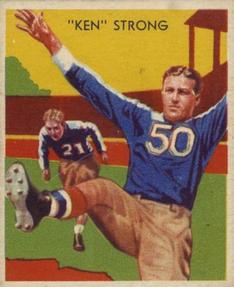
Pro Football Hall of Famer Ken Strong played for Hyannis in the 1920s

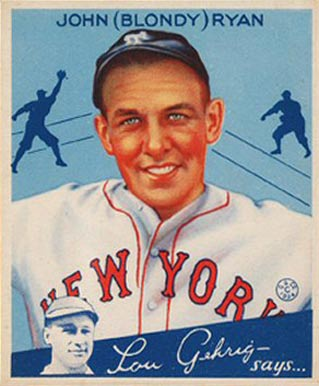
Blondy Ryan (Osterville 1929) was starting shortstop for the 1933 World Series champion New York Giants

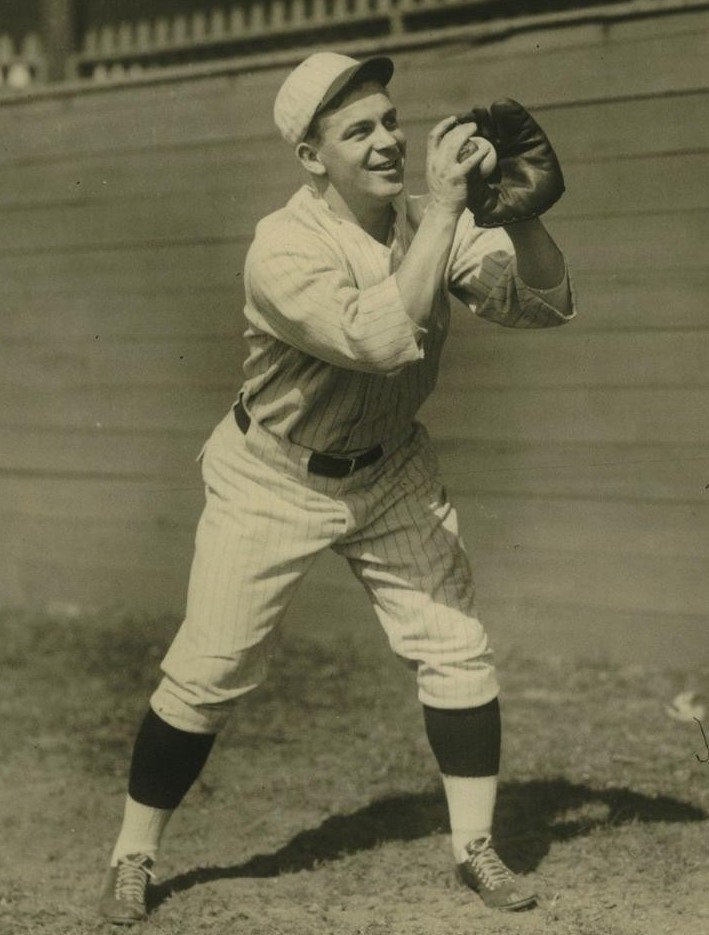
Pat Creeden played for Hyannis in the 1920s and later played for the Boston Red Sox.

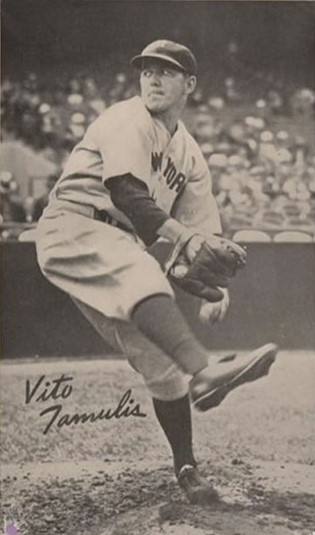
Vito Tamulis played for both Osterville and Hyannis in 1929

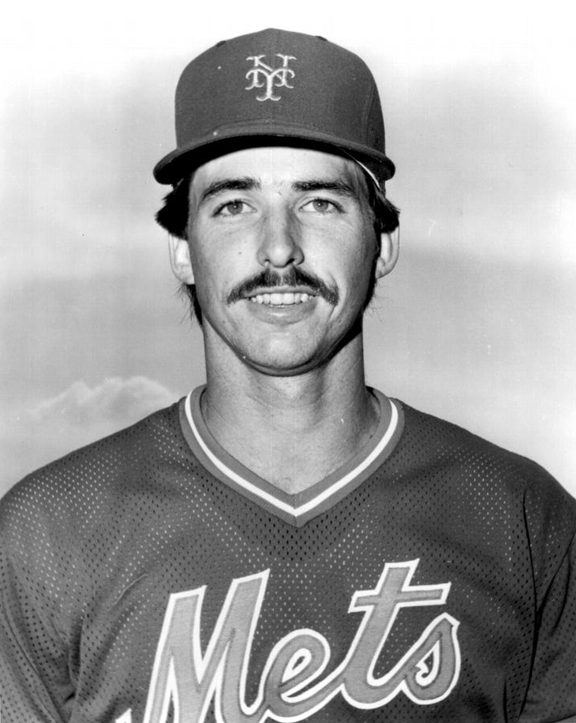
CCBL Hall of Famer Ross Jones of Hyannis' 1979 league championship club

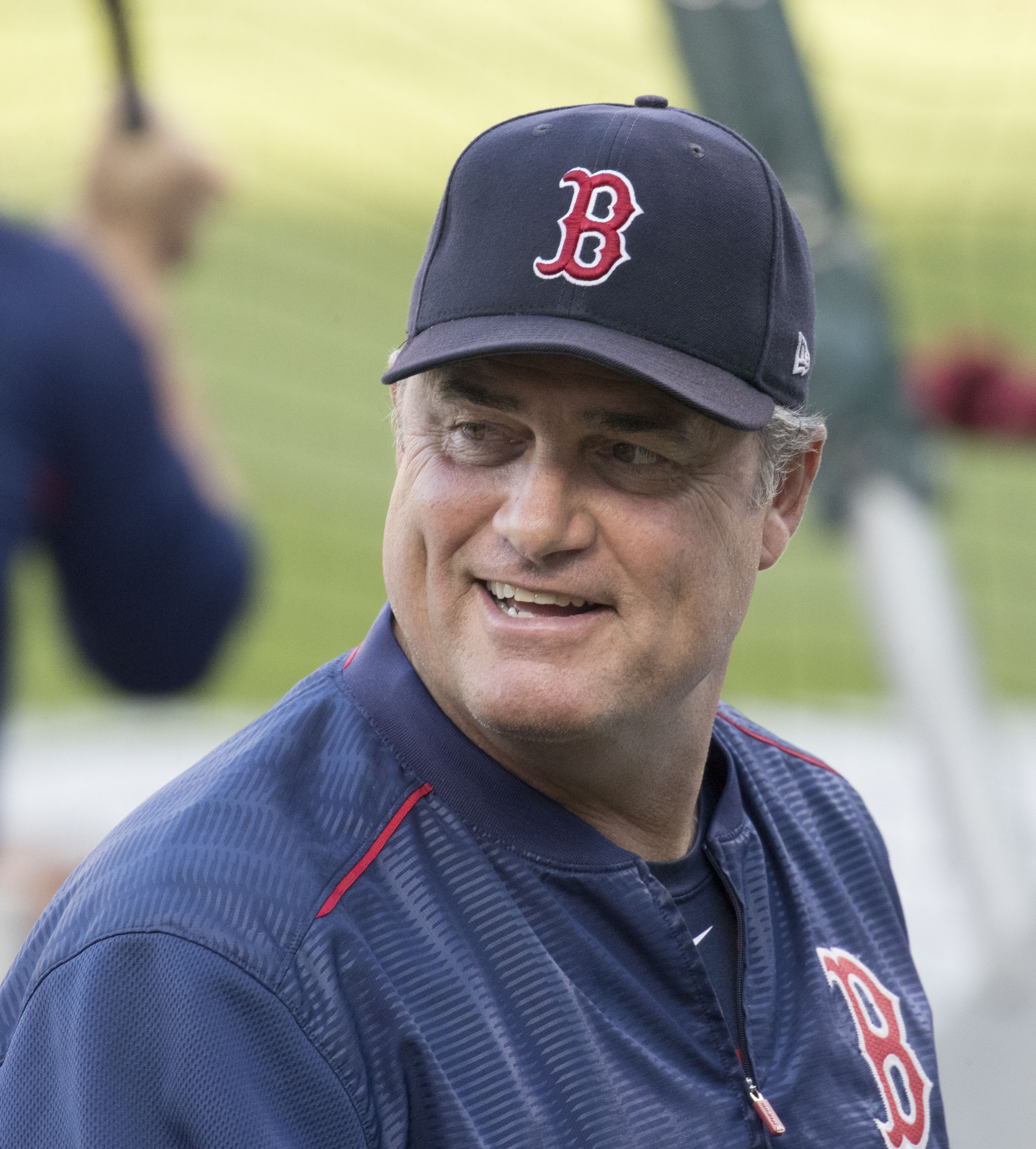
1982 Hyannis Met John Farrell

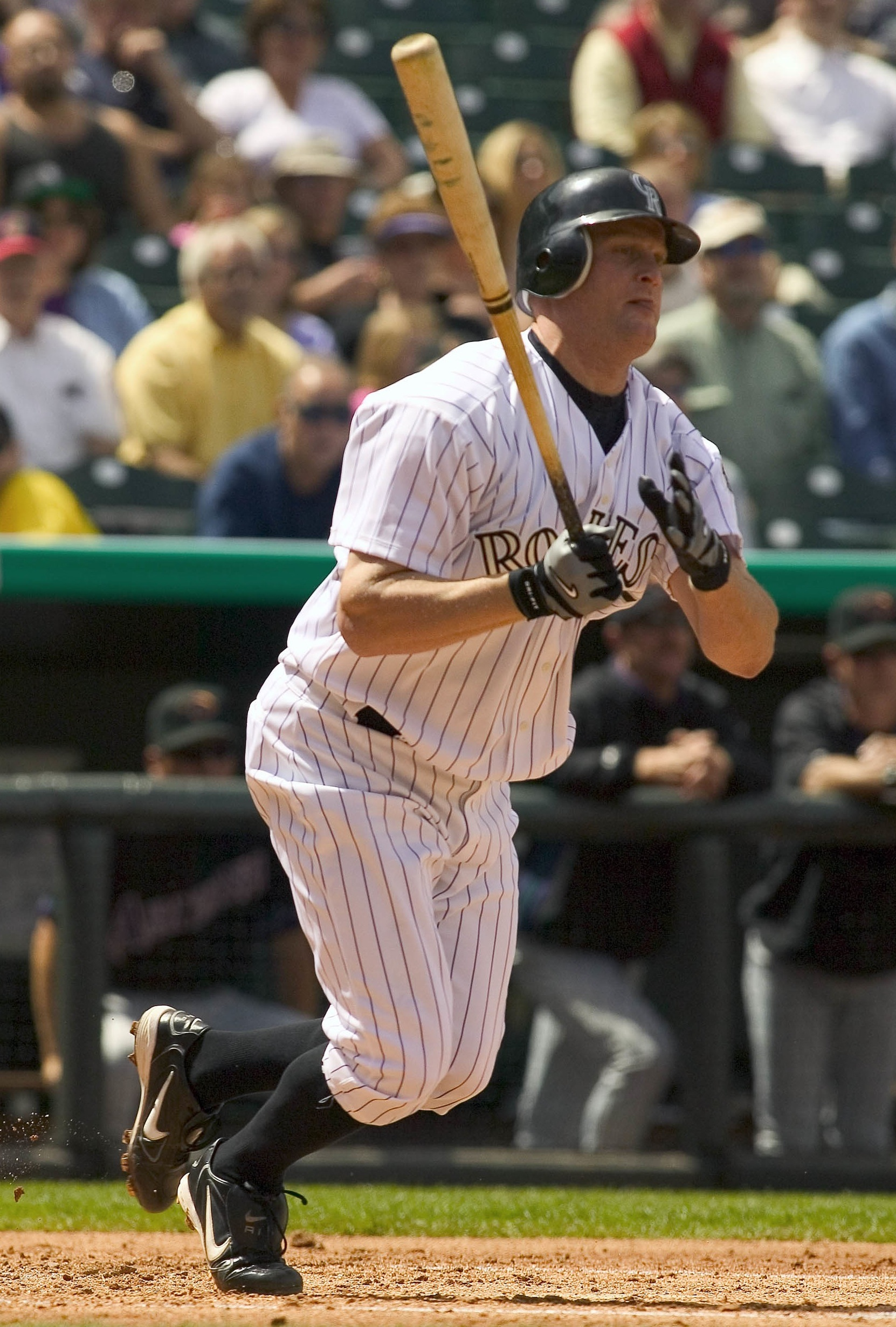
1988 Hyannis Met Jeromy Burnitz slugged 315 MLB homers

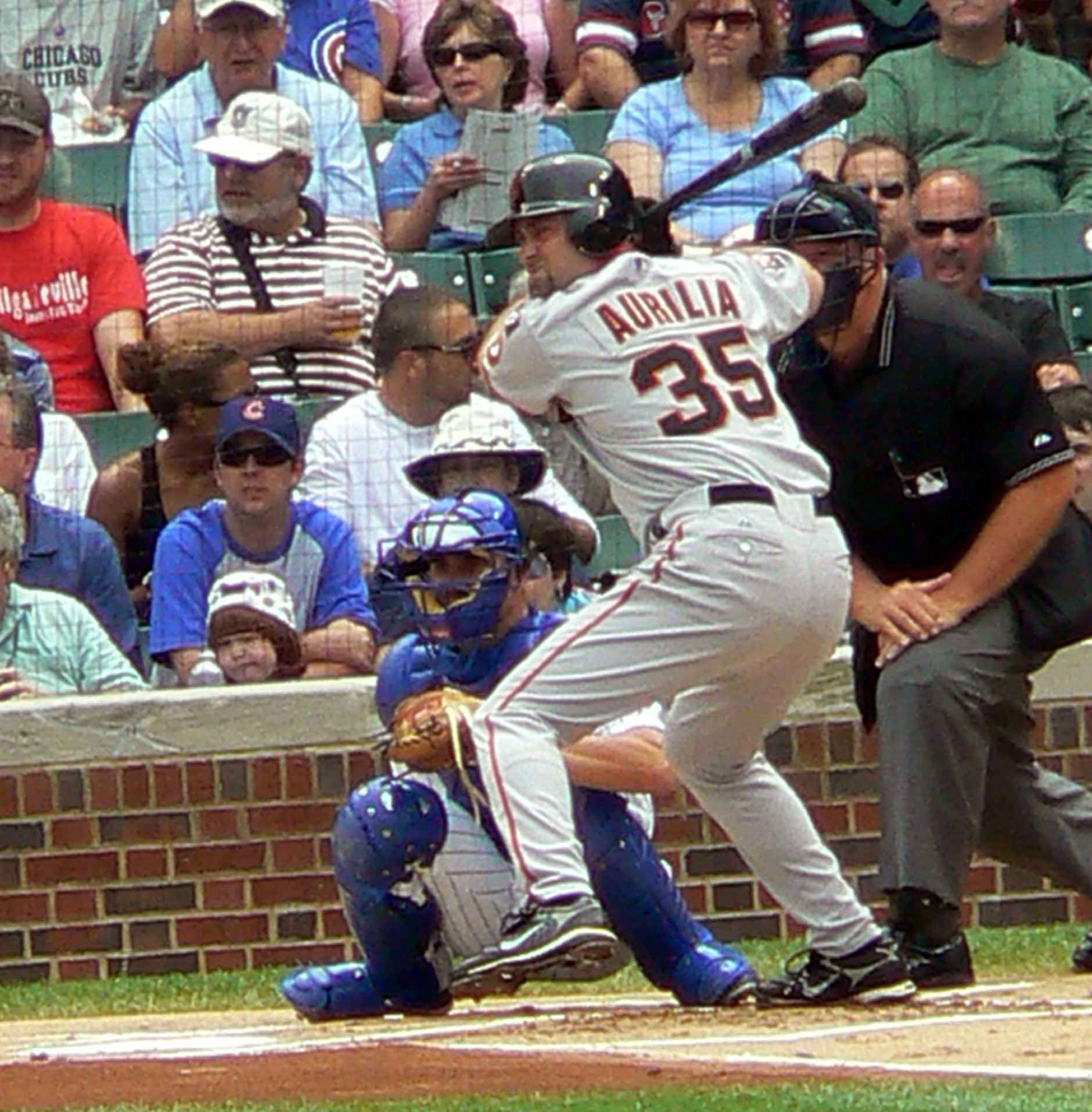
Rich Aurilia played for the 1991 CCBL champion Hyannis team

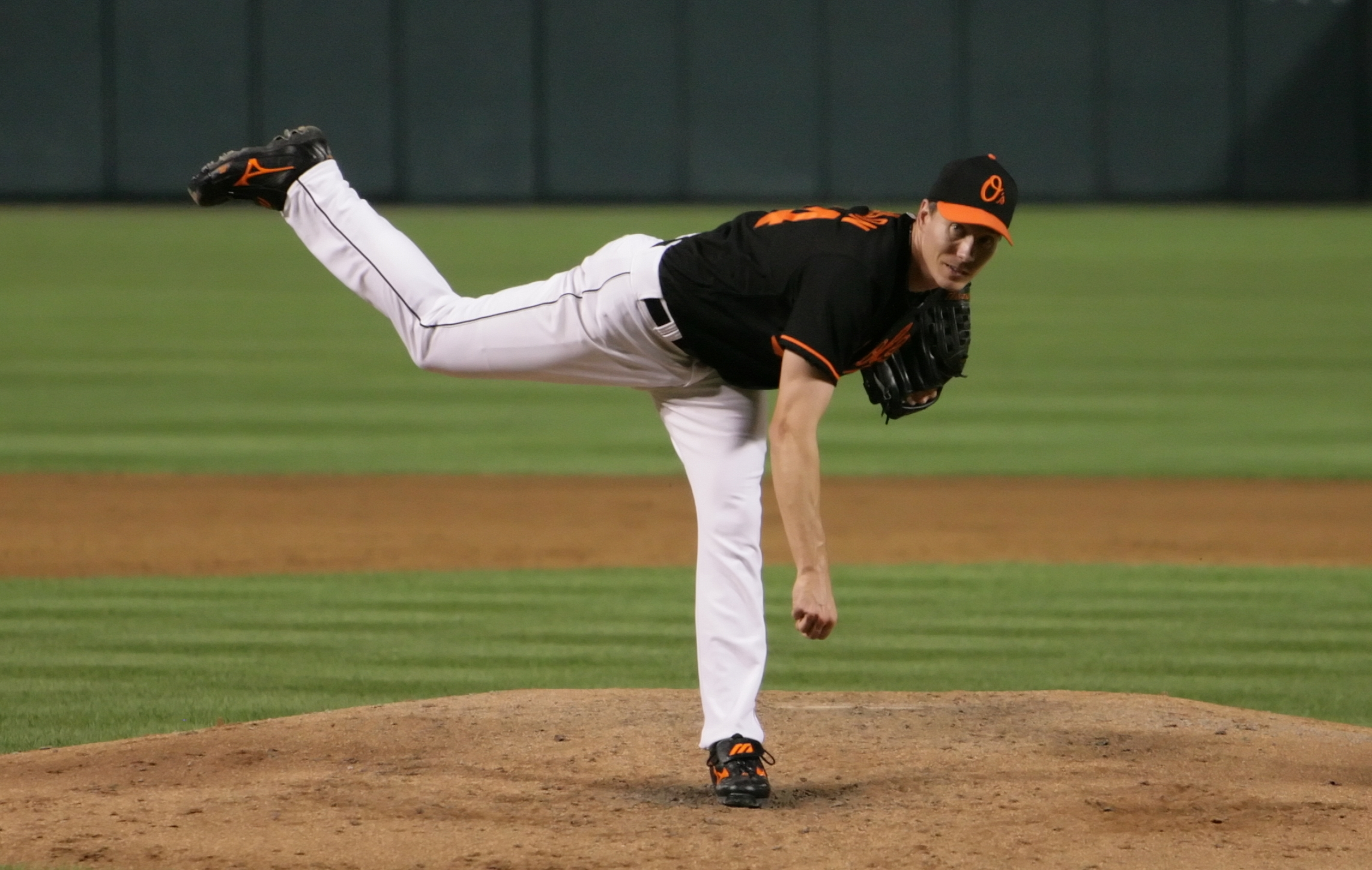
1994 Hyannis Met Kris Benson was selected first overall in the 1996 MLB draft.

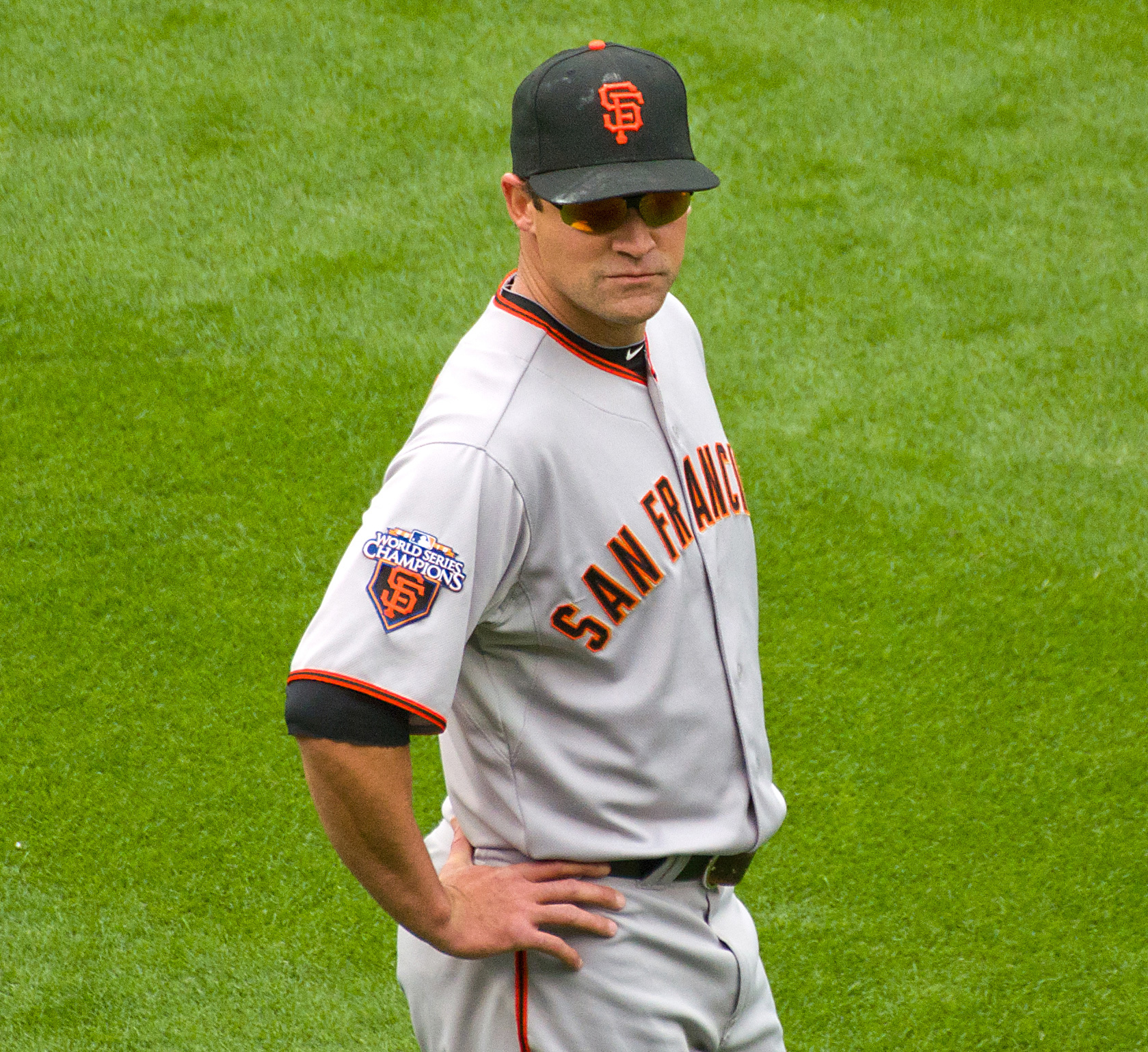
1996 Hyannis Met Pat Burrell was selected first overall in the 1998 MLB draft.

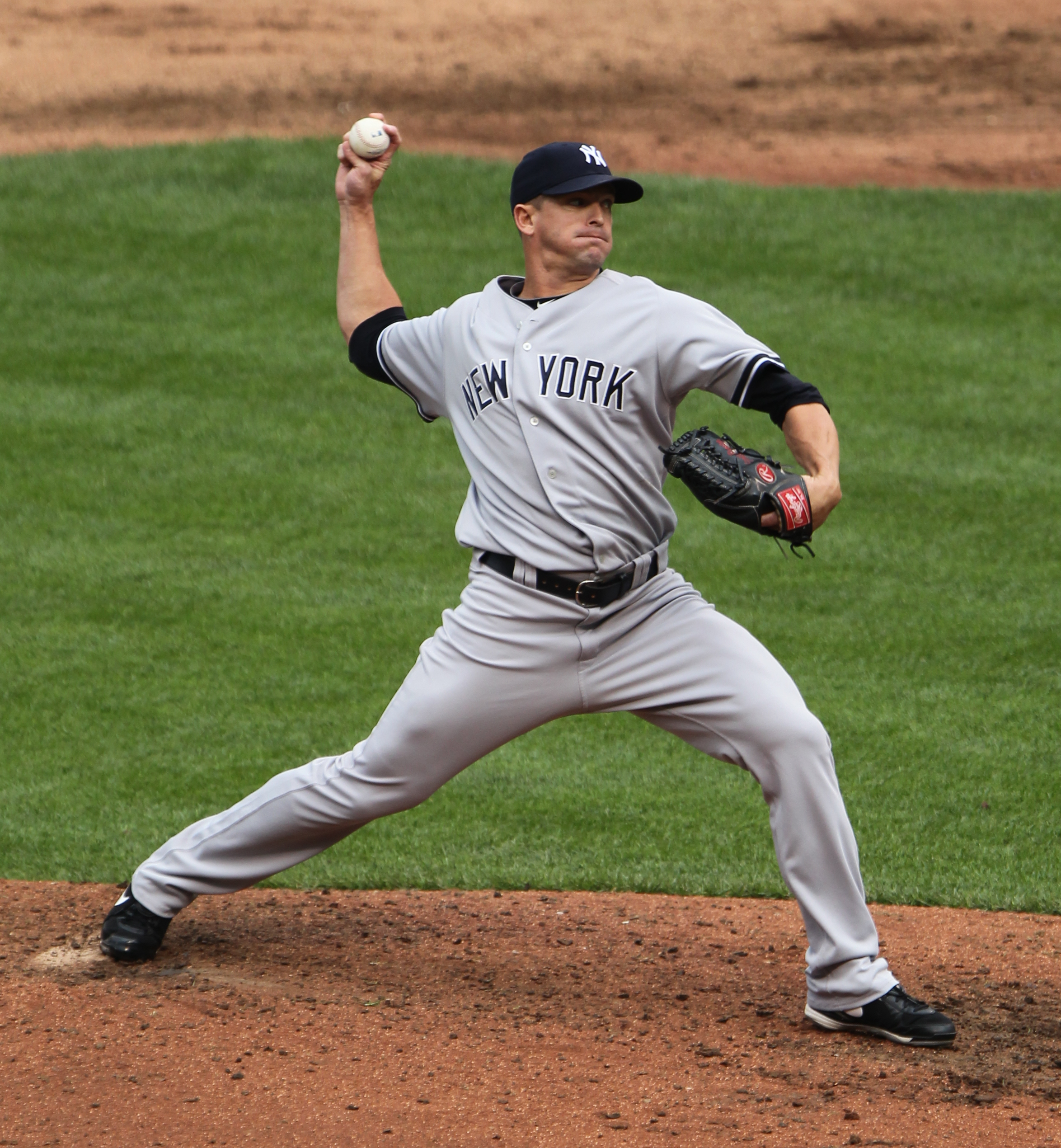
Scott Proctor played for Hyannis in 1997 and 1998

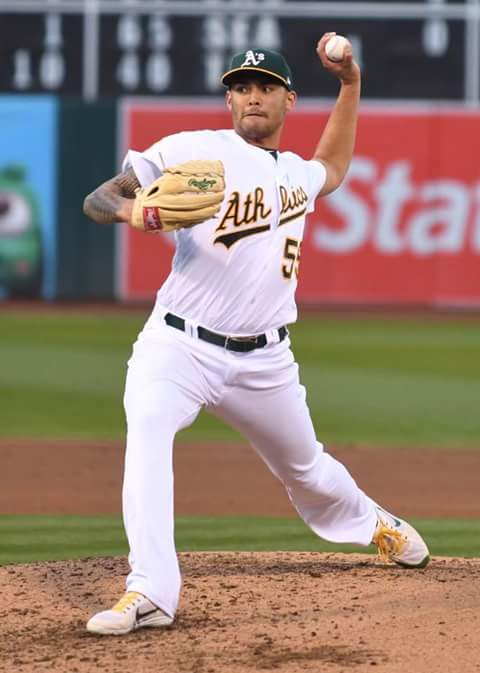
Harbor Hawk Sean Manaea was the 2012 CCBL Outstanding Pro Prospect. He no-hit the Boston Red Sox for Oakland in 2018.

=== Results by season, 1923–1939 ===
Hyannis (1923–1930)
Year	Won	Lost	Regular Season Finish	Postseason*	Manager	Ref
1923	5	7	2nd League (T)		Wally Snell	
1924	12	12	2nd League		Donald Dike	
1925					Donald Dike	
1926	24	17	1st League (T)	Won championship (co-champs)	Freddie Moncewicz	
1927	25	10	1st League	Won championship	Freddie Moncewicz	
1928	22	21	2nd League		Arthur Norton	
1929	22	22	3rd League		Freddie Moncewicz	
1930	18	26	5th League		Freddie Moncewicz	

Osterville (1923–1930)
Year	Won	Lost	Regular Season Finish	Postseason*	Manager	Ref
1923	5	7	2nd League (T)		Arthur "Dutch" Ayer	
1924	19	5	1st League	Won championship	Arthur "Dutch" Ayer	
1925			1st League	Won championship	Joe Murphy	
1926	24	17	1st League (T)	Won championship (co-champs)	John "Dot" Whelan	
1927	8	25	5th League		Arthur "Dutch" Ayer	
1928	28	14	1st League	Won championship	Eddie McGrath	
1929	19	25	5th League		Eddie McGrath	
1930	12	32	7th League		Danny Silva	

Barnstable (1931–1939)
Year	Won	Lost	Regular Season Finish	Postseason*	Manager	Ref
1931	20	28	5th League		Danny Silva	
1932	8	26	5th League		Danny Silva	
1933	24	22	2nd League (A); 4th League (B)		Pete Herman	
1934	30	18	1st League	Won championship	Pete Herman	
1935	29	19	1st League (A); 3rd League (B)	Lost championship (Falmouth)	Pete Herman	
1936	18	29	4th League (A); 4th League (B)		Pete Herman; George Colbert	
1937	29	17	1st League	Won championship	Pete Herman	
1938	Did not play					
1939	19	36	4th League (A); 3rd League (B)		Dave Concannon; George Colbert	

* During the CCBL's 1923–1939 era, postseason playoffs were a rarity. In most years, the regular season pennant winner was simply crowned as the league champion.
However, there were four years in which the league split its regular season and crowned separate champions for the first (A) and second (B) halves. In two of those
seasons (1936 and 1939), a single team won both halves and was declared overall champion. In the other two split seasons (1933 and 1935), a postseason
playoff series was contested between the two half-season champions to determine the overall champion.

=== Results by season, 1946–1962 ===
Barnstable
Year	Won	Lost	Regular Season Finish*	Postseason	Manager	Ref
1946	14	5		Lost semi-finals (Harwich)	Percy Brown	
1947	8	13			Charlie Duchesney	
1948	10	18			Warren Cook	
1949	16	18				
1950	8	20	8th Upper Cape Division (A); 6th Upper Cape Division (B)			
1951	17	17	6th Upper Cape Division (A); 2nd Upper Cape Division (B)		George Nickerson	
1952*	11	4				
1953	Did not play					
1954	Did not play					
1955	8	30			Steve Howes; Jake Marcelino; Ray Ellis	
1956	18	13	5th Upper Cape Division		Ray Ellis	
1957	Did not play					
1958	Did not play					
1959	14	18	6th Upper Cape Division (A); 3rd Upper Cape Division (B)		Charles Hitchcock; George Karras	
1960	12	16	5th Upper Cape Division		George Karras	
1961	18	12	3rd Upper Cape Division (T)	Lost round 1 (Cotuit)	Art Morgan	
1962	7	23	5th Upper Cape Division			
* Withdrew from league mid-season.

Osterville (1948–1950)
Year	Won	Lost	Regular Season Finish*	Postseason	Manager	Ref
1948	11	18				
1949	8	25			Joe MacEachron; Howard "Pop" Sears	
1950	8	23	7th Upper Cape Division (A); 9th Upper Cape Division (B)		Howard "Pop" Sears	

* Regular seasons split into first and second halves are designated as (A) and (B).

=== Results by season, 1976–present ===
Year	Won	Lost	Tied	Regular Season Finish	Postseason	Manager
1976	21	20	1	4th League	Lost semi-finals (Chatham)	Ben Hays
1977	15	21	4	7th League		Ben Hays
1978	31	11	0	1st League	Won semi-finals (Orleans); Won championship (Harwich)	Bob Schaefer
1979	33	7	1	1st League	Won semi-finals (Chatham); Won championship (Harwich)	Bob Schaefer
1980	18	23	1	6th League		Rich Magner
1981	20	22	0	5th League		Rich Magner
1982	22	19	1	3rd League	Won semi-finals (Cotuit); Lost championship (Chatham)	Rich Magner
1983	20	17	4	4th League	Lost semi-finals (Cotuit)	Rich Magner
1984	16	25	1	7th League		Rich Magner
1985	17	24	1	6th League		Rich Magner
1986	17	24	1	7th League		Frank Cacciatore
1987	25	16	0	3rd League	Lost semi-finals (Y-D)	Dave Holliday
1988	26	17	0	2nd West Division	Lost semi-finals (Wareham)	Wayne Graham
1989	24	20	0	2nd West Division	Won semi-finals (Bourne); Lost championship (Y-D)	Ed Lyons
1990	20	23	1	3rd West Division		Brad Kelley
1991	26	16	2	2nd West Division	Won semi-finals (Wareham); Won championship (Chatham)	Brad Kelley
1992	17	26	0	5th West Division		Glenn Tufts
1993	25	19	0	2nd West Division	Lost semi-finals (Wareham)	Steve Mrowka
1994	21	21	1	3rd West Division		Steve Mrowka
1995	22	20	1	3rd West Division		Steve Mrowka
1996	20	24	0	4th West Division		Steve Mrowka
1997	19	23	2	5th West Division		Steve Mrowka
1998	19	22	3	3rd West Division		Steve Mrowka
1999	18	24	2	4th West Division		Tom O'Connell
2000	21	21	2	2nd West Division	Won semi-finals (Wareham); Lost championship (Brewster)	Tom O'Connell
2001	17	27	0	5th West Division		Mike Juhl
2002	15	26	3	5th West Division		Keith Stohr
2003	21	19	4	2nd West Division	Lost semi-finals (Bourne)	Keith Stohr
2004	21	22	1	2nd West Division	Lost semi-finals (Falmouth)	Greg King
2005	7	36	1	5th West Division		Greg King
2006	16	24	3	4th West Division		Greg King
2007	20	21	3	3rd West Division		Greg King
2008	22	22	0	4th West Division		Rick Robinson
2009	16	26	1	5th West Division		Chad Gassman
2010	14	30	0	5th West Division		Chad Gassman
2011	29	15	0	4th West Division	Lost round 1 (Falmouth)	Chad Gassman
2012	17	27	0	5th West Division		Chad Gassman
2013	25	19	0	1st West Division (T)	Lost round 1 (Bourne)	Chad Gassman
2014	19	24	1	3rd West Division	Lost round 1 (Falmouth)	Chad Gassman
2015	24	19	1	1st West Division	Won round 1 (Cotuit); Won semi-finals (Bourne); Lost championship (Y-D)	Chad Gassman
2016	17	27	0	4th West Division	Lost round 1 (Falmouth)	Chad Gassman
2017	16	25	3	5th West Division		Chad Gassman
2018	24	17	3	2nd West Division	Lost round 1 (Falmouth)	Chad Gassman
2019	9	32	3	5th West Division		Chad Gassman
2020	Season cancelled due to coronavirus pandemic					
2021	8	28	0	5th West Division		Gary Calhoun
2022	22	16	6	3rd West Division	Won round 1 (Cotuit); Lost semi-finals (Bourne)	Eric Beattie
2023	25	17	2	2nd West Division	Won round 1 (Falmouth); Lost semi-finals (Bourne)	Eric Beattie
2024	24	14	2	1st West Division	Lost round 1 (Bourne)	Mitch Karraker
2025	15	21	4	4th West Division	Lost round 1 (Bourne)	Mitch Karraker
2026	22	18	0	1st West Division	Won round 1 (Cotuit); Lost semi-finals (Bourne)	Mitch Karraker

== League award winners ==
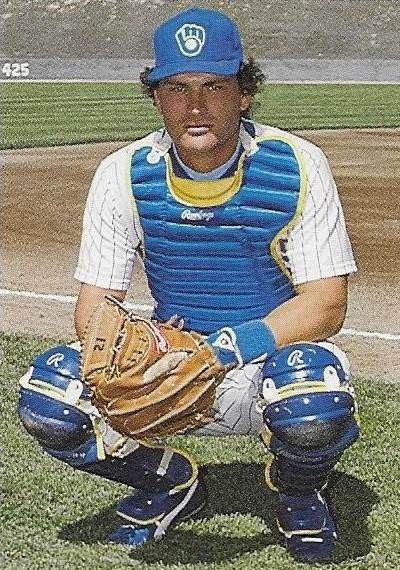
CCBL Hall of Famer Bill Schroeder, 1978 league MVP

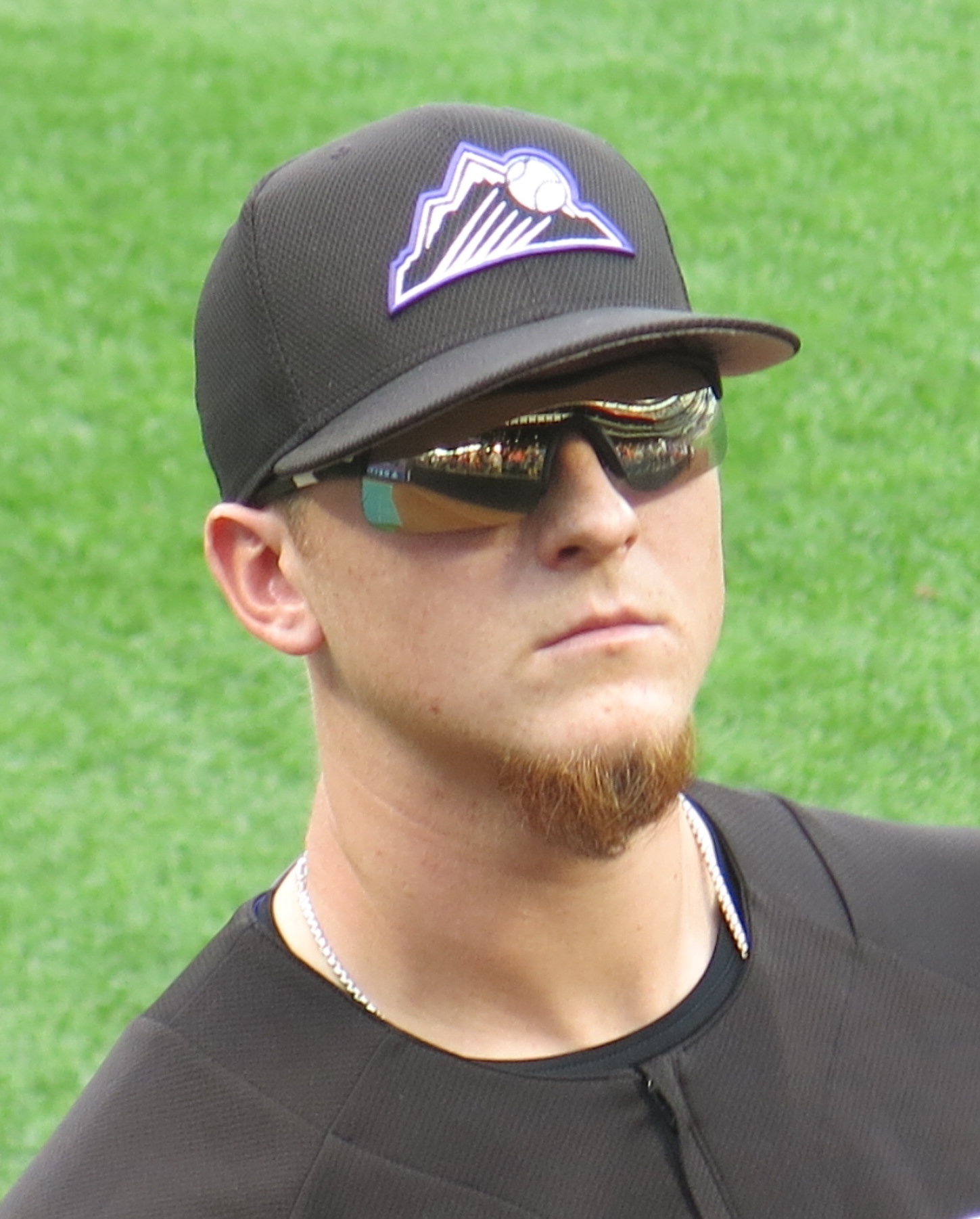
Jeff Hoffman was CCBL Outstanding Pro Prospect in 2013

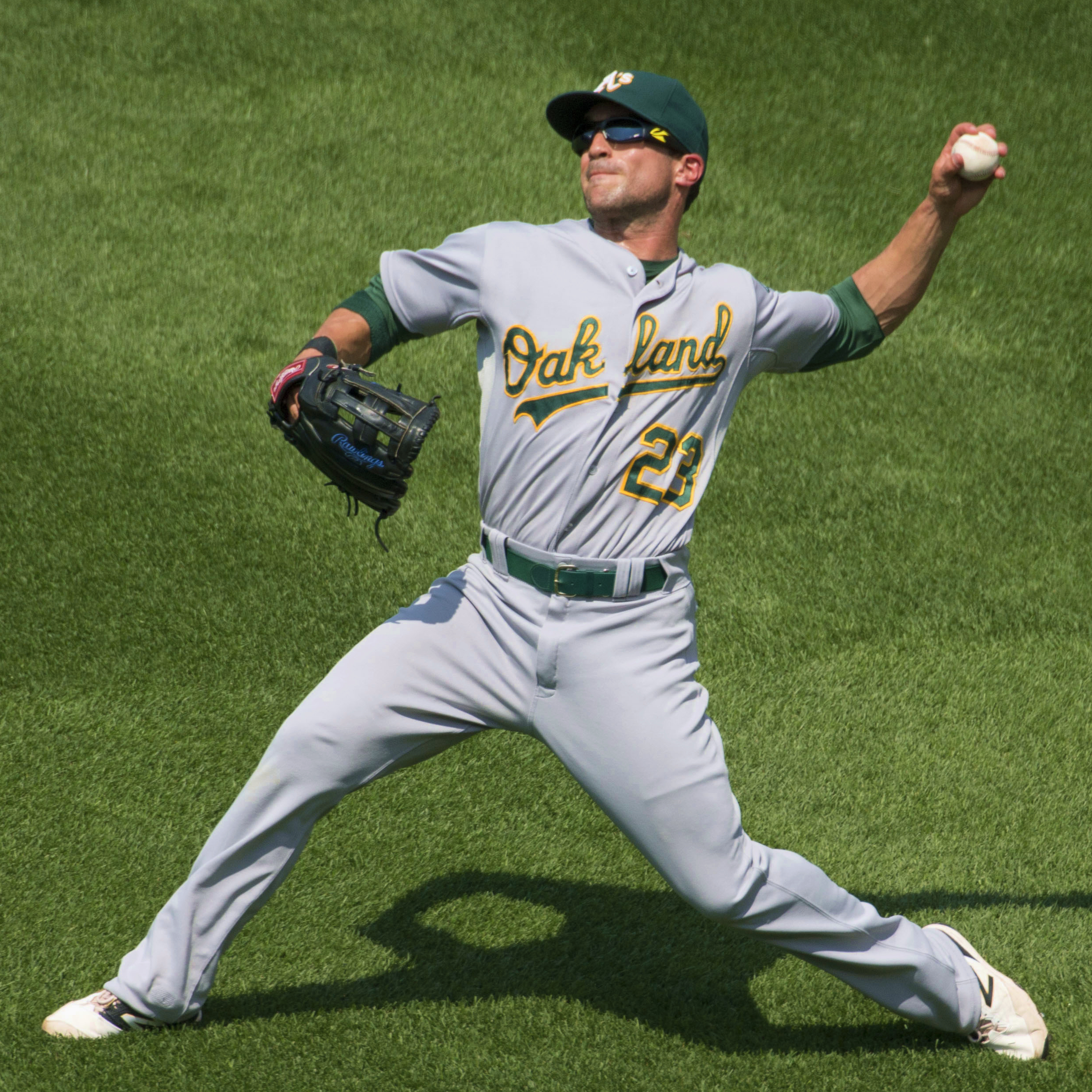
CCBL Hall of Famer Sam Fuld was the league's All-Star Game MVP in 2003

The Pat Sorenti MVP Award
Year	Player
1976	Nat Showalter
1978	Bill Schroeder
1979	Ron Perry Jr.
1993	Jason Varitek
2018	Matthew Barefoot

The Robert A. McNeece Outstanding Pro Prospect Award
Year	Player
1978	Bill Schroeder
1979	Ross Jones
1987	Robin Ventura
1989	Tyler Green
2012	Sean Manaea
2013	Jeff Hoffman
2023	Cam Smith

The BFC Whitehouse Outstanding Pitcher Award
Year	Player
1987	Pat Hope
2012	Sean Manaea

The Russ Ford Outstanding Relief Pitcher Award
Year	Player
2008	Russell Brewer
2013	Eric Eck
2016	Garrett Cave
2018	Dylan Thomas
2026	Truitt Web

The Daniel J. Silva Sportsmanship Award
Year	Player
1980	Brick Smith*
1983	Jim Howard
1988	Will Vespe
1999	Curtis Sapp
2003	Richard Mercado
2004	Chris Robinson
2007	Shea Robin

The Manny Robello 10th Player Award
Year	Player
1987	Tom Aldrich
1997	Alex Santos
2022	Rikuu Nishida
2025	Jake Schaffner

The John J. Claffey Outstanding New England Player Award
Year	Player
2006	Charlie Furbush
2015	Aaron Civale
2022	Jordy Allard

The Thurman Munson Award for Batting Champion
Year	Player
1976	Nat Showalter (.434)
1979	Ross Jones (.407)
1980	Brick Smith (.391)
1993	Jason Varitek (.371)
2006	Matt Mangini (.310)
2010	John Ruettiger (.369)
2018	Matthew Barefoot (.379)
2021	Clark Elliott (.344)

All-Star Game MVP Award
Year	Player
1979	Ross Jones
1991	Doug Hecker
1995	Dan Olson
2000	Brian Stavisky
2003	Sam Fuld
2008	Ben Paulsen
2014	Ryan Perez
2015	Devin Smeltzer*
2016	Zach Rutherford

All-Star Home Run Hitting Contest Champion
Year	Player
1991	Chad McConnell
1995	Dan Olson
2013	Skyler Ewing
2016	Kameron Esthay

The Star of Stars Playoff MVP Award
Year	Player
1991	Chad McConnell

(*) - Indicates co-recipient

== All-Star Game selections ==
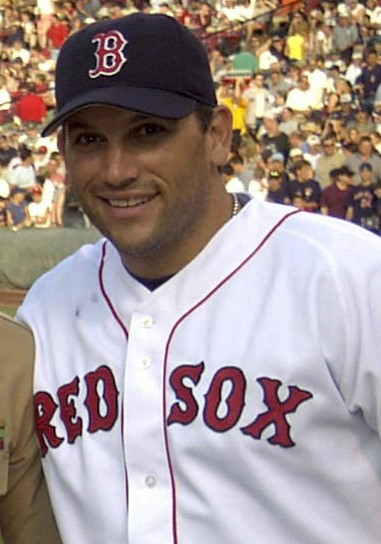
Doug Mirabelli was an all-star for Hyannis in 1990

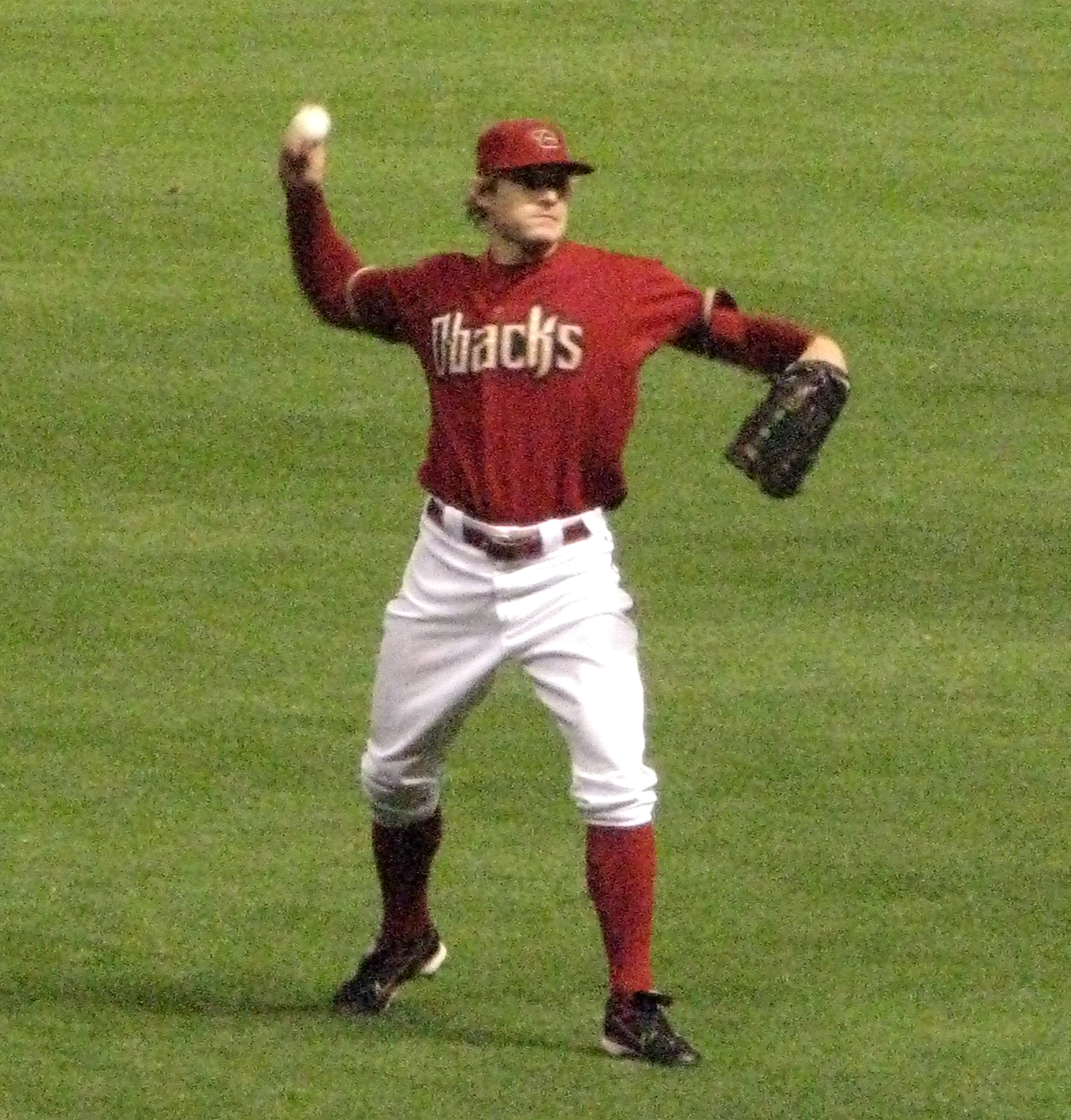
Eric Byrnes represented Hyannis at the CCBL Home Run Derby in 1996 and 1997

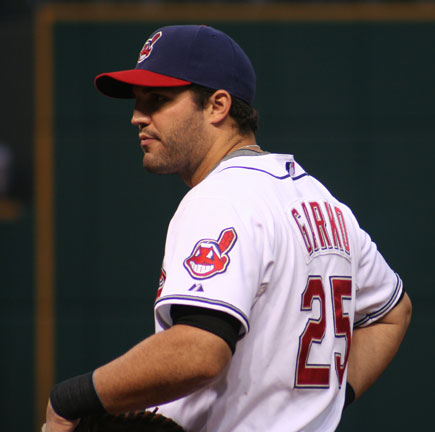
2001 Hyannis all-star Ryan Garko

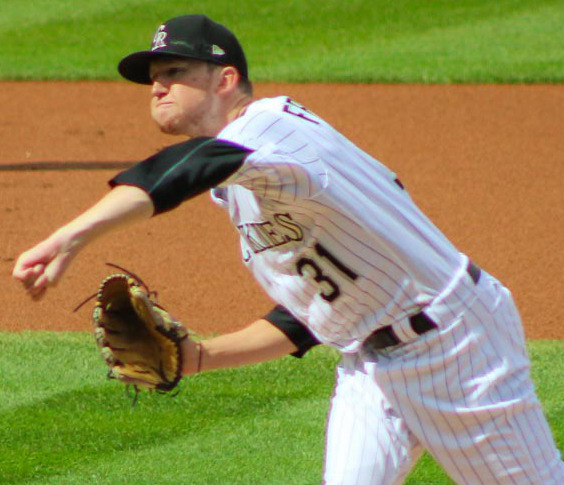
Harbor Hawk 2013 all-star Kyle Freeland

Year	Players	Ref
1976	Buck Showalter	
1977	Jim Watkins	
1978	Bill Crone, Ron Perry, Dennis Long, Bill Schroeder, John Delmonte, Jeff Twitty	
1979	Bill Crone, Ron Perry, Dennis Long, Ross Jones, Scotti Madison, Brick Smith	
1980	Jeff Ledbetter, Brick Smith	
1981	Sam Sorce, Mike Kasprzak	
1982	Rick Lockwood, Doug Shields	
1983	Mike Fiala, Bob Gibree, Chris Morgan, Jim Howard	
1984	Mike Fiala, Scott Jordan	
1985	Greg Briley	
1986	Clint Thompson, Tom Edwards, Kyle Balch	
1987	Pat Hope, Robin Ventura	
1988	Brad Beanblossom, Lance Jones, Kirk Dressendorfer, Mark Smith, Terry Taylor	
1989	Juan Flores, John Cohen, J. J. Munoz, Mike Juhl	
1990	Doug Mirabelli, Doug Kivak, John Reid, Joe Vitiello	
1991	Doug Hecker, John Smith, Chad McConnell	
1992	Robert Lewis, Mike Van Gilder, Jon Ratliff, Jeff Foster	
1993	Mike Metcalfe, Bruce Thompson, Bill Knight, Lyle Hartgrove, Matt Morris, Jason Varitek	
1994	Ryan Ritter, Dan Olson, Jamie Splittorff, Mike Glavine	
1995	Dan Cey, Ryan Grimmett, Dan Olson	
1996	Randy Niles, Josh Fogg, Pat Burrell, Ross Gload, Eric Byrnes	
1997	Scott Proctor, Pete Fukuhara, Eric Hinske, Eric Byrnes	
1998	Eric Nelson, Mike Bynum, Jack Santora, Scott Goodman, Jason Lane	
1999	Curtis Sapp, Kevin Brown	
2000	Brian Stavisky, Ryan Barthelemy, Brendan Harris, Matt Coenan	
2001	Brian Stavisky, Jason Perry, Ryan Garko, Kevin Ool, Ryan Barthelemy	
2002	Danny Putnam, Trent Peterson, Corey Hahn, Ben Harrison	
2003	Jonathan Tucker, Richard Mercado, Ryan Baty, Sam Fuld, A.J. Shappi, Zach Jackson	
2004	Chris Robinson, Shane Robinson, Pat Reilly, Mark Sauls, Joe Martinez, Mike Wlodarczyk, Mike Costanzo	
2005	Andy D’Alessio, Justin Tellam	
2006	Matt Mangini, Charlie Furbush, Daniel Latham	
2007	Shane Peterson, Dan Brewer, James Darnell, Tyler Stohr	
2008	Ben Paulsen, Trent Ashcraft, Dale Cornstubble, Andrew Carraway, Russell Brewer, Chris Dominguez	
2009	John Ruettiger, Nick Crawford, Ryan Cuneo, Dallas Gallant	
2010	John Ruettiger, Cam Seitzer, Tayler Ray, Casey McElroy	
2011	Eric Stamets, Joey Rickard, Kevin Plawecki, Dietrich Enns, Scott Firth, Adam Walker	
2012	Brandon Trinkwon, Mitch Garver, Sean Manaea, Jeff Hoffman, David Garner, Zach Alvord, Blake Austin	
2013	Austin Slater, Eric Eck, Kyle Freeland, Sarkis Ohanian, Skyler Ewing	
2014	Donnie Dewees, Daniel Kihle, Ryan Perez, Matt Denny, Carl Wise	
2015	Blake Tiberi, Jake Noll, Errol Robinson, Jake Rogers, Aaron Civale, Devin Smeltzer	
2016	Dylan Busby, Zach Rutherford, Jordan Rodgers, James Harrington, Matthew Naylor, Garret Cave, Kameron Esthay	
2017	Micah Coffey, Jake Mangum, Robert Neustrom, Ryan Weiss, Christian Tripp	
2018	Pedro Pages, Braden Comeaux, Adam Elliott, Dylan Thomas, Todd Lott, Matthew Barefoot	
2019	Tyler Mattison, Jared Desantolo, Hunter Goodman	
2020	Season cancelled due to coronavirus pandemic	
2021	Clark Elliott, Adrian Siravo, Jonah Scolaro	
2022	Cole McConnell, Magdiel Cotto, Mitch Jebb, Rikuu Nishida, Tito Flores, Dominic Pitelli, Zachary Voelker	
2023	Jamie Arnold, Elijah Hainline, Ethan Lanthier, Trey Lipsey, Nick Mitchell, Cam Smith, Brody Donay	
2024	Michael Dattalo, Sean Fitzpatrick, Casey Hintz, Kane Kepley, Aaron Savary, Eric Snow	
2025	Tyler August, Jeff Lougee, Ryan McKay, Ryan Speshyock, Jaxon Willits	
2026	Charlie Bates, Cohen Gomez, Brady St. Pierre	

Italics - Indicates All-Star Game Home Run Hitting Contest participant (1988 to present)

== No-hit games ==
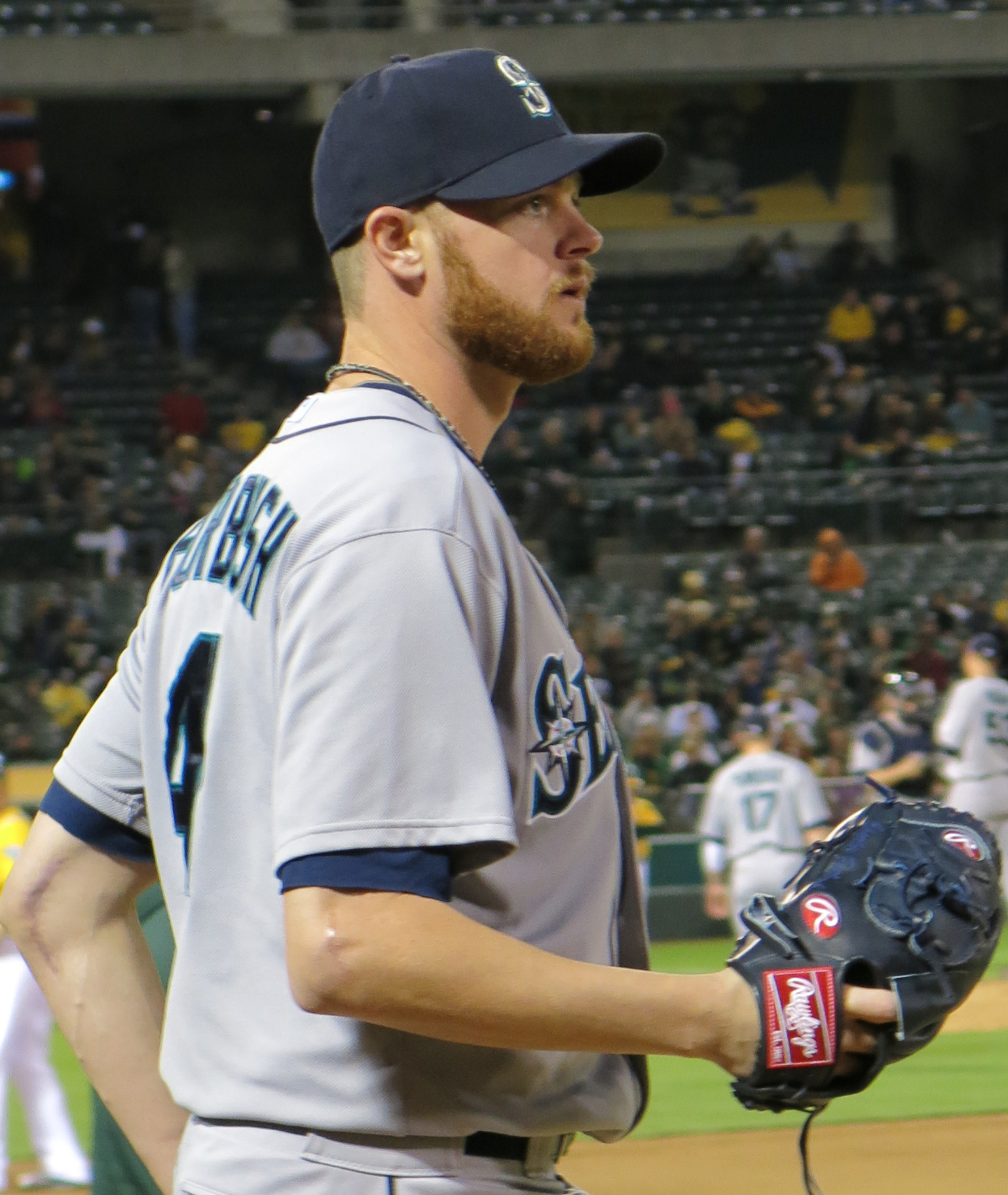
Charlie Furbush pitched a no-hitter for Hyannis in 2006, and was part of a combined no-hitter for the Seattle Mariners in 2012.

Year	Pitcher	Opponent	Score	Location	Notes	Ref
1909	Arthur Staff	Quartermasters of Boston	8–1			
1916	Ed Gill	Falmouth	3–0			
1917	Ed Gill	Rockland	2–0			
1922	Franklin Bearse (Osterville)	Middleboro	10–1	West Bay Field		
1937	Norman Merrill	Bourne	5–0	Barnstable High Field		
1949	Johnny Drew (Osterville)	Cotuit	2–0			
1949	Copeland Rogers	Otis AFB	1–0			
1951	Carlos Penzi	Falmouth (Falcons)	0–1		Combined; Lost game	
1951	Jackie Gomez	Falmouth (Falcons)	0–1		Combined; Lost game	
1987	Pat Hope	Wareham	10–0	Clem Spillane Field	Perfect game	
1991	Richard King	Wareham	3–0	McKeon Park	Playoff game; caught by Jason Varitek	
1993	Matt Morris	Falmouth	4–0	McKeon Park	6-inning game; caught by Jason Varitek	
2006	Charlie Furbush	Bourne	14–0	Doran Park		
2007	Matt Daly	Wareham	4–1	McKeon Park		
2015	Devin Smeltzer	Harwich	5–0	Whitehouse Field		

== Managerial history ==
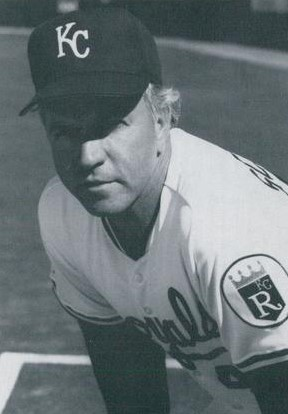
CCBL Hall of Famer Bob Schaefer skippered Hyannis to back-to-back league championships in 1978 & 1979

Manager	Seasons	Total Seasons	Championship Seasons
Ben Hays	1976–1977	2	
Bob Schaefer	1978–1979	2	1978, 1979
Rich Magner	1980–1985	6	
Frank Cacciatore	1986	1	
Dave Holliday	1987	1	
Wayne Graham	1988	1	
Ed Lyons	1989	1	
Brad Kelley	1990–1991	2	1991
Glenn Tufts	1992	1	
Steve Mrowka	1993–1998	6	
Tom O'Connell	1999–2000	2	
Mike Juhl	2001	1	
Keith Stohr	2002–2003	2	
Greg King	2004–2007	4	
Rick Robinson	2008	1	
Chad Gassman	2009–2019	11	
Gary Calhoun	2021	1	
Eric Beattie	2022–2023	2	
Mitch Karraker	2024–2026	3	

== See also ==
- Hyannis Harbor Hawks players
