= Tyler Frank =

American baseball player (born 1997)

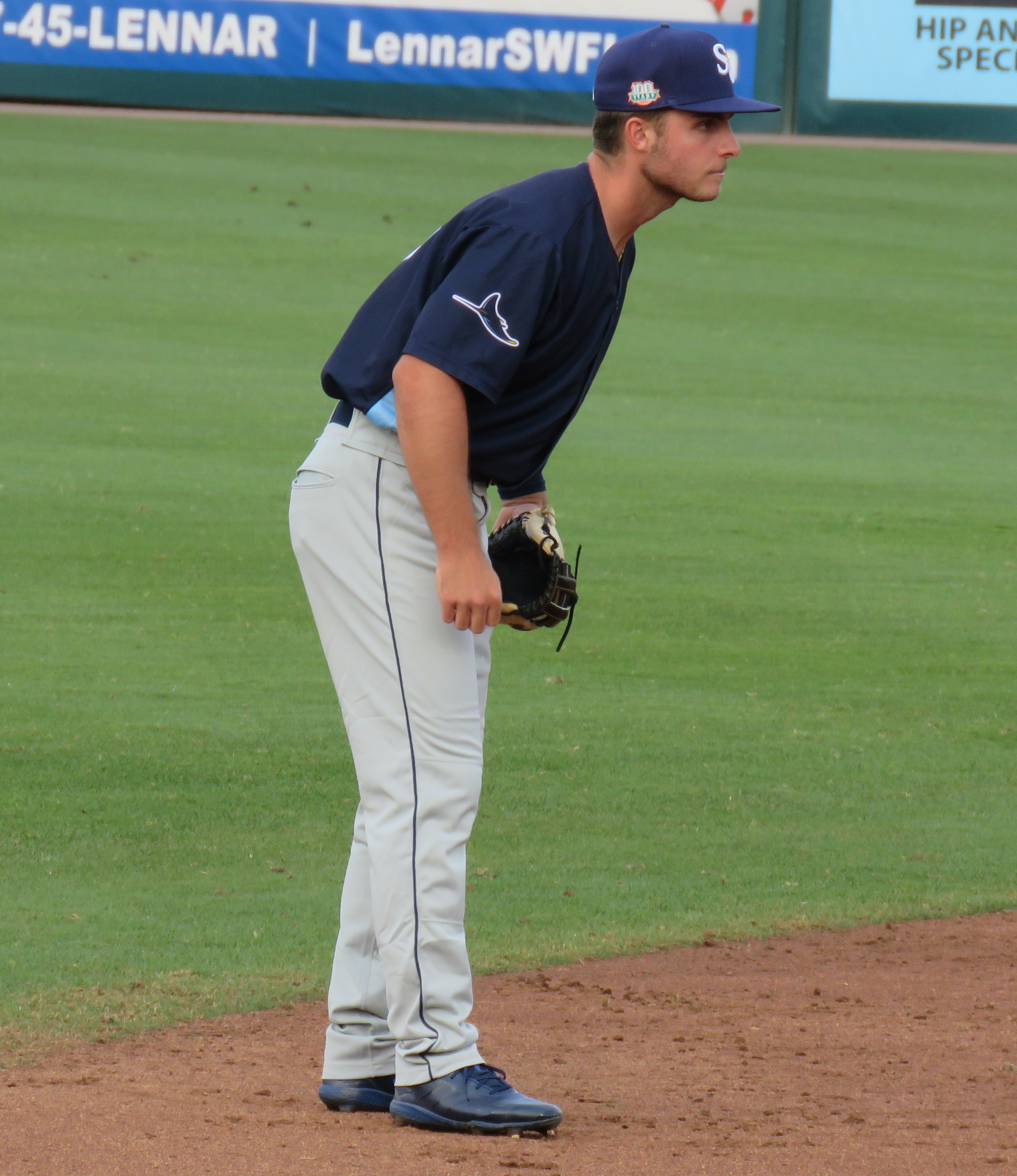
- Frank in 2019 with the Charlotte Stone Crabs
- Second baseman
- Born: January 15, 1997 (age 29); Tamarac, Florida, U.S.
- Bats: Left Throws: Right

Tyler Joseph Frank (born January 15, 1997) is an American former professional baseball shortstop.

== Career ==
Frank graduated from American Heritage School in Delray Beach, Florida. As a senior in 2015, he batted.448 and was named to the Class 4A All-State Team. He was not drafted out of high school in the 2015 Major League Baseball draft and he enrolled at Florida Atlantic University to play college baseball for the Owls.

As a freshman at FAU in 2016, Frank batted.285 with one home run, 27 RBIs, and a.401 on-base percentage in 45 games, earning him a spot on the Conference USA All-Freshman Team. In 2017, as a sophomore, Frank started all 57 of FAU's games and batted .336 with 11 home runs, 43 RBIs, and 41 walks. He was named to the All-Conference USA First Team. That summer, he played for USA Baseball's Collegiate National Team, making him the first ever FAU player to be named to the team. He also played collegiate summer baseball with the Hyannis Harbor Hawks of the Cape Cod Baseball League in 2017. In 2018, his junior year, Frank hit .300 with 13 home runs and 35 RBIs in 63 games and was once again named to the All-Conference USA First Team along with being named the Conference USA Defensive Player of the Year.

After his junior year, Frank was selected in the second round (56th overall) by the Tampa Bay Rays in the 2018 Major League Baseball draft and he signed for $997,500. He made his professional debut for the Hudson Valley Renegades of the Class A Short Season New York-Penn League, with whom he was named an All-Star, and spent the whole season there, slashing .288/.425/.412 with two home runs and 22 RBIs in 51 games. Frank began 2019 with the Charlotte Stone Crabs of the Class A-Advanced Florida State League but appeared in only 16 games due to an arm injury. He did not play a minor league game in 2020 since the season was cancelled due to the COVID-19 pandemic, and missed all of the 2021 season due to a shoulder injury. He missed the beginning of the 2022 season, but returned to play in mid-May with the Montgomery Biscuits of the Double-A Southern League after missing nearly three full seasons due to shoulder surgeries and switching from a right-handed batter to left-handed. He was demoted to the Bowling Green Hot Rods of the High-A South Atlantic League in early August but was later assigned back to Montgomery. Over 67 games between the two teams, he hit .216 with two home runs and 26 RBIs.

On March 29, 2023, Frank retired from professional baseball.
