= Ted Olson (baseball) =

American baseball player (1912–1980)

- Pitcher
- Born: August 27, 1912; Quincy, Massachusetts, US
- Died: December 9, 1980 (aged 68); Weymouth, Massachusetts, US
- Batted: Right Threw: Right

MLB debut
- June 21, 1936, for the Boston Red Sox

Last MLB appearance
- September 13, 1938, for the Boston Red Sox

MLB statistics
- Win–loss record: 1-1
- Earned run average: 7.18
- Strikeouts: 18
- Stats at Baseball Reference

Teams
- Boston Red Sox (1936–1938)

Theodore Otto Olson (August 27, 1912 – December 9, 1980) was an American Major League Baseball player for the Boston Red Sox. He played for the Red Sox for 3 seasons (1936–1938) as a starting pitcher. He threw and batted right-handed. He weighed 185 lb (84 kg) and his height was 6 ft 2 in (1.88 m). On April 14, 1940, Olson was sold by the Boston Red Sox to Philadelphia Phillies.

Olson was born in Quincy, Massachusetts. He attended Dartmouth College. As a collegian, he played summer baseball in 1934 and 1935 for the Barnstable town team in the Cape Cod Baseball League, and was one of the league's dominant pitchers.

== Career ==
Olson made his major league debut at age 23 on June 21, 1936, with the Red Sox. As a pitcher, playing 18 games in his career, he earned a career ERA of 7.18. He earned 18 strikeouts also in his career. Olson played his final game on September 13, 1938.

Olson died on December 9, 1980, in Weymouth, Massachusetts. He is buried at St. John the Evangelist Cemetery in Hingham, Massachusetts.
