= Adam Bass (baseball) =

American baseball player (born 1981)

Adam Randle Bass (born July 31, 1981) is an American former baseball player who played professionally in the Japan Pacific League.

== Biography ==
A native of Kokomo, Indiana, Bass attended high school at Madison Academy, and played college baseball at the University of Alabama in Huntsville. In 2002, he played collegiate summer baseball with the Hyannis Mets of the Cape Cod Baseball League. Bass was selected by the Arizona Diamondbacks in the 10th round of the 2003 MLB draft. In 2007, he played for the Japan Pacific League with the Tohoku Rakuten Golden Eagles.
