= Branches of the Cenél nEógain =

Branch of the Northern Uí Néill

The Cenél nEógain or Kinel-Owen ("Kindred of Owen") are a branch of the Northern Uí Néill, any of several dynasties in north-western medieval Ireland. They claim descent from Eógan mac Néill, son of Niall of the Nine Hostages. Originally their power-base was in Inishowen, with their capital at Ailech, in modern-day County Donegal in what is now the west of Ulster. Under pressure from the Cenél Conaill, they gradually spread their influence eastwards into modern counties Tyrone and Londonderry, pushing aside the Cruithin east of the River Bann, and encroaching on the Airgiallan tribes west of Lough Neagh. By the 11th century their power-base had moved from Ailech to Tullyhogue outside Cookstown, County Tyrone. By the 12th century the Cenél Conaill conquered Inishowen; however, it mattered little to the Cenél nEóghain as they had established a powerful over-kingdom in the east that had become known as Tír Eoghain, or the "Land of Owen", preserved in the modern-day name of County Tyrone.

At their greatest they held land spanning much of County Tyrone, as well as parts of counties Donegal, Fermanagh, Londonderry, Monaghan, and Armagh.

Below is a list of their principle clans and septs.

Sept of Irish origin
Sept of Scottish origin

== Clann Néill (also Clan Neill) ==
The name O'Neill may come from Niall Glúndub, however the Clann Néill (more commonly known as Clan Neill) takes its name from his grandfather Néill Caille. The O'Neills and MacLaughlins who descend from this branch, were the two principal and most powerful septs of the Cenél nEógain, however the MacLaughlins defeat at the hands of the O'Neills in 1241 led to the O'Neills dominance over the Cenél nEógain.

Sept (Common Forms)		
Ó Néill (Ruadh) (O'Neill, Neill)	Meaning: Descendant of Niall Glúndub; Progenitor: Ruadh Ó Néill	Territory: Tyrone; Extra: This branch of the O'Neills is named after Niall Ruadh (Red Niall), Prince of Tyrone, brother of Aodh Dubh (Black Hugh), King of Ulster
Mac Lochlainn (MacLaughlin, MacLoughlin, Laughlin, Loughlin)	Meaning: Of the lakes (referring to western Norway); Progenitor:	Territory: Barony of Inishowen; Extra: Leading sept of Tirconnell, some will originally be O'Melaghlins, descended from Máel Sechnaill II
Mac Barúin (Barron)	Meaning: Small landed proprietor Progenitor: Sir Art MacBarron O'Neill	Territory: Counties Armagh and Louth; Extra: Important branch of the O'Neills in counties Armagh and Louth
Mac Suibhne (Sweeney, MacSweeney, Mawhinney)	Meaning: Pleasant, well-disposed Progenitor: Suibhne O'Neill	Territory: Fanad, Banagh and the Territories in Tirconnell; Extra: Descended from Suibhne O'Neill, a Scottish chieftain from Argyll. A mixture of Dalriadic Gaels and Norsemen they came to Ulster as gallowglasses. Some Mawhinney's are thought to be Anglicisations of Mac Shuibhne, a variant of Mac Suibhne
Mac Seáin (MacShane, Johnson)	Meaning: John; Progenitor:	Territory: North-east Tyrone, later Donegal and Louth; Extra: Hereditary title of Chief of Moy Ith or Mag Itha (eastern Donegal, southern Londonderry, northern Tyrone)The small sept of O'hAmhsaigh (Hampson) from North eastern (Londonderry, Magilligan) allied themselves to the Mac Shane's.
Ó Doibhilin (O'Devlin, Devlin)	Meaning: Progenitor: Domailén	Territory: Muintir Dhoiblin (Munterdevlin), on the west shore of Lough Neagh; Extra: The chief of Munterdevlin was hereditary sword-bearer to the O'Neill, and the Devlin's part of his cavalry
Mac Néill (McNeill, McNeil)	Meaning: Progenitor:	Territory: Counties Antrim and Londonderry; Extra: Originate from the Scottish Clan MacNeil, who claim to descend from a Niall, 21st in descent from Niall of the Nine Hostages, founder of the Uí Néill dynasty. They came to Ireland as gallowglasses, and later as pirates.
Mac Conmidhe (MacNamee)	Meaning: Hound of Meath; Progenitor:	Territory: Counties Tyrone and Londonderry; Extra: Hereditary poets and ollavs to the O'Neills
Mac Conmidhe (MacConamy, MacConomy, Conamy, Conomy, Conmee, Conway)	Meaning: Hound of Meath; Progenitor:	Territory: Counties Tyrone and Londonderry; Extra: Alleged to be no connection between these and the MacNamees
Mac Giolla Easpuig (Gillespie, Bishop)	Meaning: Servant of the bishop Progenitor:	Territory: Aeilabhra in barony of Iveagh, county Down; Extra: A branch settled and became erenaghs of Kilrean and Kilcar, in the baronies of Boylagh and Banagh, county Donegal
Mac Íomhair (MacIvor, MacKeever)	Meaning: Bow-warrior, archer Progenitor:	Territory: Extra: From the Norse personal name Ivarr meaning bow-warrior, archer
Mac Laomuinn (Lamont, MacLamont, MacLamond, MacErchar, Brown, MacClement, Clement)	Meaning: Lawman, lawyer Progenitor: Ladhman mac Giolla Colum	Territory: County Tyrone; Extra: Derived from the Old Norse name Lōgmaðr, meaning 'lawman' or 'lawyer', Gaelicised as Ladhmann. Some were also called MacErchar after Ladhman's grandfather Fearchar. The Mac Laomuinn ancestry allegedly traces them to Flaithbertach Ua Néill. The Lamonts adopted several "colour" names after they had been "broken" and forbidden to use their own name, these include Brown and Black.
Mac Eoghain (McKeown, Keon, MacGowan, Owens, MacCune)	Meaning: Owen; Progenitor:	Territory: Extra: Many are originally Ó Ceothain or Ó hEoghain (O'Keown's) rather than Mac Eoghain

== Clann Aodha Bhuidhe ==
The Clann Aodha Bhuidhe, or Clandeboye O'Neill, is a branch of Clann Néill, descended from Aodh Meth (Hugh the Fat), King of Ulster from 1196 to 1230; Aodh Medh's brother was Niall Ruadh (Red Niall), King of Ulster for a month after his death, and Prince of Tyrone. The eponym of the clan was Aodh Buidhe (Yellow Hugh) O'Neill (1260–83), grandson of Aodh Meth, and last King to be called King of Ailech; Aodh Buidhe was most notable for his close co-operation with the Earldom of Ulster. The Clandeboye O'Neills would later take control over most of eastern Ulster with the collapse of the Earldom of Ulster due to the invasion of Edward Bruce, whom they had opposed. Henry O'Neill of this line was King of Ulster from 1325 to 1344; Art O'Neill from 1509 to 1514.

Sept (Common Forms)		
Ó Néill (O'Neill, Neill)	Meaning: Descendant of Niall Glúndub; Progenitor: Aodh Buidhe Ó Néill	Territory: Extra: This branch of the O'Neills is more commonly known as the Clandeboy O'Neill's, with Clandeboy being the Anglicisation of Clann Aodha Bhuidhe. It takes its name from Aodh Buidhe (Yellow Hugh), grandson of Aodh Dubh (Black Hugh), King of Ulster, brother of Niall Ruadh (Red Niall), Prince of Tyrone, who claimed vast tracts of land from the Normans
Mac Conuladh (MacNaul, MacNally)	Meaning: Hound of Ulster Progenitor: Cú Uladh Ó Néill	Territory: Antrim Extra: Descended from Cú Uladh, son of Brian Ballagh Ó Néill, King of Clandeboye who was killed in battle at Carrickfergus in 1425.
Ó Gnímh (Agnew, O'Gnyw, O'Gnew, O'Gnive)	Meaning: Progenitor:	Territory: Extra:Poets to the O'Neills of Clandeboye. This sept is thought to have come from Scotland at the same time as the MacDonald galloglasses but not as a galloglass family itself. It is presumed it was among the original Irish septs to colonise Scotland in the 5th century

== Clann Domnaill ==
The Clann Domnaill (Clan Donnell) originated in County Donegal however moved eastwards into what is now County Tyrone. The clan is reputedly descend from Domnaill mac Áed, son of Áed Findliath and Gormlaith Rapach, daughter of Muiredach mac Echdach, King of Ulster.

Sept (Common Forms)		
Ua Donnghaile Ó Donnghaile; O'Donnelly Donnelly	Meaning: Brown(-haired) warrior Progenitor: Donnghaile Ó Néill	Territory: Fear Droma Lighen, (Drumleen), Donegal then to Baile-Ua-nDonnghail (Ballydonnelly), Tyrone Extra: Hereditary chief was marshall of the O'Neill's forces
Ó Flaithbheartaigh; O'Flaherty Laverty Lafferty	Meaning: Bright prince Progenitor: Flaithbheartach mac Murchadh	Territory: Aileach, Donegal and later Ardstraw, Tyrone; Extra: Formerly Lords of Ailech and later rotated the Kingship of Tyrone with the O'Neills and MacLaughlins

== Clann Birnn ==
The Clann Birnn (kindred of Birn) is descended from Bern mac Ruadrí mac Murchad mac Máel Dúin mac Áeda Alláin. This clan resided in Muintir Birn (in barony of Dungannon) and Tellach Ainbhith (in barony of Strabane) both in modern-day County Tyrone.

Sept (Common Forms)		
Mac Ruaidhrí (MacCrory, MacRory, Rodgers, Rogers)	Meaning: Red king Progenitor:	Territory: Teallach Ainbhith and Muintir-Birn, and Ballynascreen in Londonderry; Extra:
Mac Murchadha (MacMurphy, Murphy, Morrow)	Meaning: Sea warrior Progenitor:	Territory: Muintir-Birn; Extra: Chiefs of Siol Aodha. They were driven out by the O'Neills and settled in the highlands of south Armagh under O'Neill of the Fews
Ó Firghil (Friel, Freel)	Meaning: Man of valour Progenitor:	Territory: Donegal, and lesser extent in Tyrone and Londonderry; Extra: Hereditary holders of the office of abbot, of Kilmacrenan, Donegal

== Cenél Feargusa ==
The Cenél Feargusa (kindred of Fergus) are descended from Fergus, the son of Owen, who was the son Niall of the Nine Hostages. It is sometimes also known as the Cenél Coelbad as the descended septs are through his son Coelbad. The clan originally resided in Inishowen, County Donegal before battling their way towards Tullyhogue, County Tyrone where they became masters of Tyrone and the vanguard of the O'Neills. They advanced into Tyrone after the Cenél mBinnigh had already led the way.

Sept (Common Forms)		
Ó hÁgáin (O'Hagan, Hagan, Haggens, Higgins)	Meaning: Young; Progenitor: Ogain mac Coelbad	Territory: Originally Inishowen, then Tullyhogue in Tyrone; Extra: Originally spelt Ó hÓgáin. Held the hereditary right of inaugurating the O'Neill as King of Ulster, as well as hereditary "brehons" of the O'Neills
Ó Coinne (O'Quinn, Quinn, Quin, Conney, Quinney)	Meaning: Counsel; Progenitor: Coínne mac Coelbad	Territory: Originally Inishowen, then Tyrone; Extra: Acted as quartermasters to the O'Neills
Ó Maelfabhail (MacFall, MacPaul, Fall, Paul, Mulfoyle, Lavelle)	Meaning: Devotee of (St) Fabhail; Progenitor: Mael Fabaill mac Coelbad	Territory: Carrickbraghy in north-west Inishowen, and later Londonderry and Tyrone; Extra: Last of the Cenél nEóghain clans in its ancestral homeland of Inishowen, conquered by the O'Dohertys of the Cenél Conaill
Ó Mealláin (O'Mallon, O'Mellan, Mallon, Mellan, Mellon)	Meaning: Pleasant; Progenitor: Aedh mac Fergus	Territory: Meallanacht (O'Mellan's Country), Slieve Gallion; Extra: Joint keepers of St. Patricks bell, the Bell of Testament
Ó Bruadair (O'Broder, Broder)	Meaning: Dream; Progenitor:	Territory: Donegal; Extra:
Ó Cearnaigh (Kearney, Carney)	Meaning: Victorious; Progenitor:	Territory: Erenaghs of Killaghtee in Boylagh and Banagh in Donegal; Extra:
Ó Robhartaigh (O'Roarty, Roarty, Rafferty)	Meaning: Flood-tide; Progenitor:	Territory: Donegal; Extra: An ecclesiastical sept who were co-arbs to St Columcille on Tory Island
Ó Doirighe (Ó Daire) (O'Derry, Derry)	Meaning: Oak wood Progenitor:	Territory: Raphoe, Donegal; Extra: Erenaghs of Raphoe

== Cenél mBinnigh ==
The Cenél mBinnigh (kindred of Binny), are descended from Eochu Binneach (Ochy Binny), son of Eógan. The Cenél mBinnigh where the first clan of the Cenél nEóghain to advance from Inishowen, bypassing the fierce resistance of the Ciannachta (northern County Londonderry) and into western Airgialla (modern-day County Tyrone), and in doing so ousted several Airgiallan clans (Ui Tuirtri and FIr Li) to east of the River Bann.

From the Cenél mBinnigh came the following branches:

- Cenél mBinnig Glinne in the valley of Glenconkeine, barony of Loughinsholin, County Londonderry
- Cenél mBindigh Locha Droichid east of Magh Ith in County Tyrone
- Cenél mBindigh Tuaithe Rois eas of the river Foyle in County Londonderry and north of the barony of Loughinsholin

Sept (Common Forms)		
Ó hÁghmaill, Ó hÁdhmaill (O'Hammell, O'Hamill, Hamill, Hamell, Hammill, Hammell, Hamilton)	Meaning: Descendant of Ádhmall (quick, ready, active); Progenitor: Eochach Binnich m. Éogain m. Néill Noígiallaig; Cinéal (Kinship); Cenél nEógain	Territory: South Tyrone and Armagh; Hereditary Chief or Clan chief; Ua hAghmaill (O'Hamill), Teallach Duibhbrailbe; Extra: Giolla Criost Ó hAdhmaill, taoiseach of Clann Adhmaill who fought with the last King of Ulaid, Ruaidhrí Mac Duinnshléibhe against John de Courcy in 1177. In the 12th century Ruarcan O'Hamill, was the chief Poet to the powerful O'Hanlon

== Cenél Moen ==
The Cenél Moen are descended from Moen, son of Murdoch, son of Eógan. In the 14th century, this clan was forced across the River Foyle by the O'Donnells to northeast and east Strabane.

Sept (Common Forms)		
Ó Goirmleadhaigh (O'Gormley, Gormley, Gorman, Grimley, Graham)	Meaning: Noble and valourous one Progenitor:	Territory: Rahpoe, Donegal and later east Strabane; Extra: Hereditary chiefs of the Cenél Máién
Ó Peatáin (O'Patton, Patton, Peyton)	Meaning: Diminutive of Patrick; Progenitor:	Territory: Ballybofey, Donegal; Extra:
Ó Lúinigh/O Lainidh (O'Lunney, O'Looney, O'Loney,)	Meaning: Armed with spear Progenitor:	Territory: Raphoe, Donegal, then Strabane, Tyrone, and later Inishmore Island, Fermanagh; Extra: Hereditary physicians and historians. A branch of O'Lunney's would later build their headquarters at Ard Uí Luinín on Inishmore Island, Fermanagh
Mac Conallaidh (MacAnally, MacNally)	Meaning: Wolf; Progenitor: Cú Allaidh	Territory: Lios Chon Allaidh (Lisanally), Strabane, Tyrone Extra: Hereditary chief was high steward to the O'Neill, later became chiefs of Cenél Moen to the exclusion of O'Gormley.
Mac Duinechaidh (Donnchaidh) (MacDonaghy, Donaghy)	Meaning: Brown warrior Progenitor:	Territory: Tyrone and Londonderry; Extra:
Ó Croidheáin (Crean, Cregan, Creggan, O'Crean, O'Cregan)	Meaning: Heart (used as term of endearment); Progenitor:	Territory: Donegal; Extra:
Ó Tighearnaigh (O'Tierney, Tierney)	Meaning: Master or lord Progenitor:	Territory: Donegal; Extra:
Ó Ceallaigh (O'Kelly, Kelly)	Meaning: Progenitor:	Territory: Donegal; Extra:
Ó Cearnacháin (Kernaghan, Kernohan, Cernaghan)	Meaning: Victorious; Progenitor:	Territory: Donegal; Extra:
Mac Gairbhith (MacGarvey)	Meaning: Rough; Progenitor:	Territory: Donegal; Extra:
Mac Giolla Uidhir (McAleer)	Meaning: Son of the servant or follower of St Ohdran; Progenitor:	Territory: Raphoe, Donegal, east Strabane and still commonly found in the Omagh area of Tyrone. Extra:

== Cenél Fearadhaigh ==
The Cenél Fearadhaigh, or 'kindred of Ferry', descend from Feradach mac Muiredach (Ferry MacMurdoch), a grandson of Eógan, and by the 12th century controlled a large portion of County Tyrone and had penetrated deep into County Fermanagh. By the mid-14th century, the Maguires would break the power of the Cenél Fearadhaigh in Fermanagh. Some septs also appear prior to the 17th Century Plantation in the "woodkerne" inhabited forest of Glenconkeyne. Note: Fearadhaigh was spelt as Feradaig in Old Irish (c700-c900) and Middle Irish Gaelic (c900-c1200). Feradach means 'Woodsman' from fear 'man' and fiodh 'wood' combined into Fer-fedach, Fer-fid (Ferid), 'man-wood.' and -ach 'belonging to, involved with or having'

Sept (Common Forms)		
Mac Cathmhaoil (MacCawell, Campbell, Caulfield, MacCall; sub-septs include McQuaid, McWilliams, Short and Slaven)	Meaning: Battle-chief; Progenitor:	Territory: Barony of Clogher, County Tyrone; Extra: Leading sept of the Cenél Fearadhaigh, and one of the seven powerful septs supporting O'Neill. This name as MacCawell is now very rare as Mac Cathmhaoil has been Anglicised into a vast array of different names including: Alwell, Alwill, Callwell, Campbell, Carlos, Caulfield, Cawell, Howell, MacCaul, MacCall, McCall, MacCorless, MacCowell, MacCowhill, MacHall. The first to be recorded as Donnchadh Mac Cathmail who died in 1180.
Mac Giolla Mhártain (MacGilmartin, Gilmartin, Martin, Kilmartin)	Meaning: Devotee of St. Martin; Progenitor:	Territory: Barony of Clogher, County Tyrone; Extra:
Ó Brolacháin (O'Brallaghan, Brollaghan, Bradley, Brodie)	Meaning: from the Irish "brollach" meaning "breast" Progenitor:	Territory: Parts of Donegal, Londonderry, and Tyrone; Extra: This was a prolific and adventurous sept, where a branch of the family, the O'Brologhans, became established in the Western Highlands of Scotland via their connections with the monastery on Iona thanks to the prior of Derry, Domhnall Ua Brolcháin, who was its abbot. The Co. Cork Bradleys descend from this sept, and some Brollaghans on Co. Cavan assumed the Norman name Brabazon.
Ó Fearadhaigh (O'Ferry, Ferry, Ferris)	Meaning: Woodsman; Progenitor:	Territory: Donegal; Extra:
Mac Máirtain (MacMartin, Martin)	Meaning: Son of Máirtain; Progenitor:	Territory: Tyrone; Extra: A different branch from the Mac Giolla Mhártain
Mac Fhiachra (MacKeighry, MacKeefry, MacKeaghery, Hunter)	Meaning: Fiachra means hunter/tracker or something that hunts/tracks things down. Progenitor:	Territory: Tyrone; Extra:
Maolgeimridh (Mulgemery, Montgomery)	Meaning: Follower of St. Eimridth or Geimridh (winter); Progenitor:	Territory: East Tyrone; Extra: Noted by O'Hart Pedigrees as being in possession of the two districts of the Cenél Fearadhaigh in east Tyrone
Maolpadraig (Mulpatrick, Kilpatrick)	Meaning: Follower of Padraig, Maol meaning ‘follower’, ‘servant’ or ‘devotee’ Progenitor:	Territory: East Tyrone; Extra: Noted by O'Hart Pedigrees as being in possession of the two districts of the Cenél Fearadhaigh in east Tyrone; also mentioned in the Topographical Poems of John O'Dubhagain and Giolla Na Naomh O'Huidhrin
Mag Uidhrín (McGivern, McGiveran, McGivergan)	Meaning: Son of the Dun-Coloured One; Progenitor: Uidhrín Ua Maoil-Muire	Territory: Barony of Clogher, Co. Tyrone; Extra: An old Ulster surname. Early in the 12th century, Eachmarcach Mac Uidhrín (d. 1120ad) was chief of Cinel Fearadhaigh, in the present Co. Tyrone, As was his father, Uidhrin Ua Maoil-Muire (d. 1082ad) and his son Giolla-Christ Ua hUidhrin (d. 1129ad). In the 16th century, the name was peculiar to Co. Down, and even at the present day is largely confined to there and the neighbouring counties of Antrim and Armagh. Many variants of this surname exist in its anglicanised form (40+), Some of which may include Maguirin, M'Gwyrin, M'Guiverin, Magiverin, Magivern, Magiveran, MacGiverin, MacGiveran, MacGivern, McGivern, McGiveran, McGivergan, Guerin, etc. Several Gaelic variations have been recorded - Mag Uidhrin, Mac Uidhrén, Mac Uidhrein, Mac Uidhrín, (Mac Uidhrea?).

== Cenél Tigernaich ==
The Cenél Tigernaich, or race of Tierney, descend from Tigernach mac Muiredach, grandson of Eógan, however the Book of Ballymote states Tigernach as his son.

Sept (Common Forms)		
Ó Maoilfothartaigh (O'Mulfoharty)	Meaning: Progenitor:	Territory: County Tyrone; Extra:
Ó hEodhusa (O'Hosey)	Meaning: Progenitor:	Territory: County Tyrone; Extra:
Ó Connagain (O'Coneghan, Coneghan, Cunningham, O'Cunigan)	Meaning: Progenitor:	Territory: West Londonderry, east Donegal, Tyrone; Extra:

=== Cenél Mac Earca ===
The Cenél Mac Earca, or kindred of McErca descend from Muircherdaich, a grandson of Eógain, who was also called Mac Earca after his mother. This branch would produce a line of kings that were styled as sovereigns of Ireland. A Máel Fithrich, son of Áeda Uaridnaich, was styled as being the chief of this branch, and his death at the hands of the Cenél Fearadhaigh saw this branch end up in the barony of Clogher, County Tyrone.

=== Clann Conchúir Magh Ithe ===
The Clann Conchúir Magh Ithe, or Clan Connor, originally hailed from Magh Ithe in County Donegal before moving into County Londonderry, ruling a region that became known as O'Cahan Country. This clan descend from Connor Mac Fergal, who in turn is descended from Muirceartach Mac Earca founder of the Cenél Mic Earca.

Sept (Common Forms)		
Ó Cathaín (O'Kane, Kane, Keane, MacKane, O'Cahan)	Meaning: Progenitor:	Territory: O'Cahan Country, equivalent to the barony of Keenaght; Extra: Originally Anglicised as O'Cahan before O'Kane
Ó Dubhthaigh (O'Duffy, Duffy, Doohey, Dowey)	Meaning: Black one Progenitor: St Dubhtach	Territory: Raphoe, Donegal; Extra: Erenaghs of Templecrone in the diocese of Raphoe for 800 years, being kinsmen of the patron of the church, St Dubhthach
Ó Maoláin (O'Mullan, Mullan, Mullen, Mullin, Mullane, Mollan)	Meaning: Bald or tonsured Progenitor:	Territory: Barony of Keenaght, County Londonderry; Extra:
Mac Bhloscaidh (MacCloskey, MacCluskey, Glasgow)	Meaning: Progenitor: Bloscaidh Ó Cathaín (Bloskey O'Cahan)	Territory: Extra:

== Clan Diarmatta (also Clandermot) ==
The Clann Diarmatta, or Clandermot, descend from the Clann Conchúir Magh Ithe. The parish of Clondermot in County Londonderry is said to derive its name from this clan's territory.

Sept (Common Forms)		
Ó Cairealláin (Carlin, O'Carolan, Carolan, Carleton)	Meaning: Progenitor:	Territory: Erenaghs of Clonleigh, barony of Raphoe. Parish of Clondermot, O'Cahan Country; Extra:
Mac Eiteagain (MacEttigan, MacGettigan)	Meaning: Swarthy; Progenitor:	Territory: Clondermot; Extra:

== O'Cahan of the Route ==
The O'Cahan's of the Route are a branch of the Ó Cathaín that moved into the area of north-eastern County Londonderry and north-western County Antrim known historically as "the Route". The Route was held by the Hiberno-Norman MacQuillans, and a fierce rivalry would erupt between the O'Cahans and MacQuillans. The end of this rivalry would see the destruction of the MacQuillans power and the weakening of the O'Cahans corresponding to the rise of MacDonnells.

The Scottish clans Both Chanain (Buchanan, Mawhinney) and Mac Ausaláin (MacCausland) both descend from Ausalan Buoy O'Kayn, allegedly of the O'Cahans of the Route.

== Cenél Aenghusa ==
The Cenél Aenghusa, or 'kindred of Angus', are only mentioned as being of the Cenél nEóghain by a citation in the Annals, with a similar reference in the Book of Lecan.

Sept (Common Forms)		
Mac Cana or Mac Anna (MacCann)	Meaning: Wolf cub or son of Annadh; Progenitor:	Territory: Ailech, Donegal then Clanbressil, County Armagh; Extra:

== Other Septs ==
Sept (Common Forms)		
Ó Branagáin (Brannigan)	Meaning: Raven; Progenitor: Bran	Territory: Oriel, on the border between Ulster and Leinster; Extra: Made their way into counties Armagh, Monaghan, and Louth in the sixteenth and seventeenth centuries. This surname was used synonymously with Brankin in the Crumlin area of county Antrim.
Ó Branáin (Brennan, Brannan)	Meaning: Raven; Progenitor: Bran	Territory: Counties Monaghan and Fermanagh; Extra: Thought to be a contraction of Ó Branagáin. Unrelated to the Ó Braonáin and Mac Branáin septs outside of Ulster. Brennan was used synonymously with Brannie in the Ards peninsula, county Down
Ó Corragáin (Corrigan)	Meaning: Progenitor: Coirdhecán	Territory: Dromore, Tyrone then migrated early to Fermanagh becoming erenaghs of Magheraveely; Extra: Said to be of the same stock as the Maguires, however are thought to descend from the Cenél nEóghain

== See also ==
- Northern Uí Néill
- Branches of the Cenél Conaill
- Ailech
- O'Neill dynasty

== Bibliography ==
- Robert Bell (1988) . "The Book of Ulster Surnames", The Black Staff Press
