= Hampson =

Hampson is an English surname with either a Norman connection or an Irish/Gaelic connection. English (mainly Lancashire) derivation "Son of..." Hamo or Hamon (meaning 'host' or 'home'). Alternate spelling: Hamson or Hameson. Irish derivation shortened, Anglicized form of Ó hAmhsaigh ‘descendant of Amhsach’ a byname meaning ‘mercenary soldier’ or ‘messenger’, from the adjective amhasach ‘aggressive’. Note that the English/Norman derivation is supported back to 16th century (Robert Hampson, sheriff of London), while the Gaelic derivation is supported back to 17th century (Denis Hampsey/Hampson/Ó Hámsaigh, Irish harper).

May refer to:

== A ==
- Alan Hampson (1927–1989), English footballer
- Alfred Hampson (1865–1924), Australian politician
- Anne Hampson (1928–2014), British novelist
- Art Hampson (born 1947), Canadian ice hockey player
- Arthur Hampson (1878–1952), English cricketer

== B ==
- Billy Hampson (1882–1966), English football player and manager

== C ==
- Chad Hampson (born 1988), Antiguan cricketer
- Christopher Hampson (born 1973), English ballet choreographer
- Connor Hampson (born 1998), German rugby league footballer
- Craig Hampson (born 1990), English rugby union player

== D ==
- Damian Hampson (born 1970), Australian rules footballer
- Daphne Hampson (born 1944), British theologian
- Denis Hampson, Denis Hampsey or Donnchadh Ó Hámsaigh (1695–1807), Irish harper
- Denise Hampson (born 1978), Welsh track cyclist

== E ==
- Ellie Hampson (born 2001), Australian rules footballer
- Eric Hampson (born 1921), English footballer

== F ==
- Fen Osler Hampson, Canadian academic
- Frank Hampson (1918–1985), British illustrator

== G ==
- Garrett Hampson (born 1994), American baseball player
- Geoff Hampson (born 1968), Canadian bridge player
- George Hampson (1860–1936), British entomologist
- Gord Hampson (born 1959), Canadian hockey player

== H ==
- Harry Hampson (1918–1942), English footballer

== J ==
- Jack Hampson (1887–1960), Welsh footballer
- James K. Hampson (1877–1956), American archaeologist
- Misses Jane and Mary Hampson, quilters
- Jimmy Hampson (1906–1938), English footballer
- John Hampson (writer) (1760–1819), English religious writer
- Jack Hampson (1887–1960), Welsh footballer
- John Hampson (novelist) (1901–1955), English novelist
- John Hampson (musician), American guitarist and vocalist, member of rock band Nine Days
- John Hampson (artist) (1836–1923), artist who created bug art in Vermont
- Justin Hampson (born 1980), American baseball player

== K ==
- Keith Hampson (born 1943), British politician

== L ==
- Les Hampson (born 1934), Australian rugby league footballer

== M ==
- Matt Hampson (born 1984), English rugby player
- Michelle Hampson, American neuroscientist
- Mike Hampson (born 1973), English speedway rider

== N ==
- Norman Hampson (1922–2011), English historian

== R ==
- Robert Hampson (born 1965), English guitarist
- Robert Hampson (sheriff) (1537–1607), a Sheriff of the City of London in 1599
- Robert Gavin Hampson (born 1948), British poet and academic
- Roger Hampson (1925–1996), English artist
- Roger Hampson (footballer) (born 1948), Australian rules footballer

== S ==
- Sarah Hampson (born 1958), Canadian journalist
- Shaun Hampson (born 1988), Australian rules footballer
- Stephen Hampson (born 1968), English cricketer
- Steve Hampson (born 1961), English rugby player
- Stuart Hampson (born 1947), English executive

== T ==
- Ted Hampson (born 1936), Canadian hockey player
- Ted Hampson (sprinter) (1910–1990), Australian athlete
- Thomas Hampson (born 1955), American baritone
- Thomas Hampson (author) (1839–1918), English author and local historian
- Toby Hampson (born 1975), attorney and judge in North Carolina
- Tommy Hampson (1907–1965), English 800 m runner, Olympic champion 1932
- Tommy Hampson (footballer), English football player

== W ==
- Walker Hampson (1889–1959), English footballer
- Wayne Hampson (born 1957), Australian tennis player
- William Hampson (1854–1926), first person to patent a process for liquifying air

== See also ==
- Hampson Museum State Park
