= Hamill =

Hamill is a surname originally of Norman origin, a habitational name from Haineville or Henneville in Manche France named from the ancient Germanic personal name Hagano, Old French ville ‘settlement’.

In England (Lancashire): nickname for a maimed person or someone with a distinctive scar from Middle English Old English hamel ‘mutilated scarred’.

Irish (Ulster): according to MacLysaght a shortened Anglicized form of Gaelic Ó hÁdhmaill ‘descendant of Ádhmall’ which he derives from ádhmall meaning ‘active’.

== Notable people ==
- Aaron Hamill (born 1977), Australian rules footballer
- Alex Hamill (footballer, born 1961), Scottish footballer
- Alex Hamill (footballer, born 1912), Scottish footballer
- Billy Hamill (born 1970), American motorcycle speedway rider
- Brendan Hamill (disambiguation), several people
- Christine Hamill (1923–1956), English mathematician
- Christopher Hamill (born 1958), better known as Limahl, lead singer of the 1980s English pop group Kajagoogoo
- Claire Hamill (born 1954), English singer-songwriter
- David Hamill (born 1957), Queensland Australian Labor Party politician
- Desmond Hamill (1936–2013), British television reporter
- Dorothy Hamill (born 1956), American figure skater
- Harry Hamill (1879–1947), Australian rugby footballer
- James A. Hamill (1877–1941), U.S. Representative from New Jersey
- Jamie Hamill (born 1986), Scottish footballer
- Joe Hamill (born 1984), Scottish footballer
- John Hamill (born 1947), English actor
- John Hamill (baseball) (1860–1911), American baseball player
- Kate Hamill, American actress and playwright
- Matt Hamill (born 1976), American wrestler
- Mark Hamill (born 1951), American actor
- Mickey Hamill (1889–1943), Irish footballer
- Pat Hamill (born 1950), Scottish footballer
- Patrick Hamill (1817–1895), U.S. Representative from Maryland
- Pete Hamill (1935–2020), American journalist and writer
- Peter J. Hamill (c. 1885–1930), American politician
- Red Hamill (Robert George Hamill; 1917–1985), Canadian ice hockey player
- Rob Hamill (born 1964), New Zealand rower and political candidate
- Tommy Hamill (died 1996), Northern Irish footballer
- Zach Hamill (born 1988), Canadian ice hockey player

== Name history ==
- This surname Hamill is derived from the name of an ancestor. 'the son of Hamel'; compare the local Hamilton,' the town of Hamil' (v. Town). From the same root as Hamo; v. Hammon and Hamlin..

== Hamill Name Meaning ==
- Scottish (Lanarkshire): of Norman origin a habitational name from Haineville or Henneville in Manche France named from the ancient Germanic personal name Hagano + Old French ville ‘settlement’.
- The English (Lancashire): nickname for a maimed person or someone with a distinctive scar from Middle English Old English hamel ‘mutilated scarred’.

== See also ==
- Hamel (disambiguation)
- Hamill (film), a biographical film about deaf wrestler Matt Hamill
- Hamill, South Dakota, a census-designated place in the United States
- Hammill, another spelling
- Hamilton (name), a related surname
