= Gilmartin =

Gilmartin is a surname. Notable people with the surname include:

- Charlotte Gilmartin (born 1990), English speed skater
- Ian Gilmartin, British inventor
- L. Gilmartin, 19th-century Scottish footballer
- Mark Gilmartin (born 1963), American golf administrator
- Mike Gilmartin (born 1986), American football player
- Paul Gilmartin (born 1963), American comedian
- Phil Gilmartin, British molecular biologist and botanist
- Raymond Gilmartin (born 1941), American businessman
- Rene Gilmartin (born 1987), Irish footballer
- Sean Gilmartin (born 1990), American baseball player
- Thomas Gilmartin (1861–1939), Irish Roman Catholic clergyman
- Tom Gilmartin (disambiguation), multiple people
