= John Hampson =

John Hampson may refer to:

- John Hampson (writer) (1760–1819), English religious writer
- Jack Hampson (1887–1960), Welsh footballer
- John Hampson (novelist) (1901–1955), English novelist
- John Hampson (musician), American guitarist and vocalist, member of rock band Nine Days
- John Hampson (artist) (1836–1923), artist who created bug art in Vermont
- John Hampson (bowls), Scottish bowls player
