= Thomas Hampson (disambiguation) =

Thomas Hampson (born 1955) is an American baritone opera singer.

Thomas Hampson may also refer to:

- Sir Thomas Hampson, 1st Baronet (c. 1589–1655), of the Hampson baronets
- Sir Thomas Hampson, 2nd Baronet (c. 1626–1670), of the Hampson baronets
- Thomas Hampson (author) (1839–1918), English author and local historian
- Tommy Hampson (footballer) (1898–?), English footballer
- Tommy Hampson (1907–1965), British track and field athlete

== See also ==
- Hampson (surname)
