= Ó hÁdhmaill =

Ó hÁḋmaıll Ó hÁdhmaill Ó hÁmaill
- Pronunciation: O'Hamill
- Gender: Masculine

Other gender
- Feminine: Ní Ádhmaill, Bean Uí Ádhmaill, Uí Ádhmaill

Origin
- Language: Irish
- Meaning: Descendant of Ádhmall (quick, ready, active)
- Region of origin: Ruled a territory in South Tyrone & Armagh, now found across Ulster and Louth
- Motto: Esse Quam Videri; To Be Rather Than To Seem

Other names
- Variant forms: Ádhmall, Áḋmaıll, Ui hAdhmaill, Ó hÁḋmaill, Ó hAdhmaill, O'hAdhmaill, Ui hAghmaill, Ó hÁghmaill, Ó hAghmaill, O'hAghmaill, O'Hamill, Hamill, Hamil, Hammill, Hammil, O'Hamell, O'Hammell, Hamell, Hammell, Hammel, Hamel, Homill, Hommill, Homil, O'Hammoyle, Hamall, Hammall, Hamaill
- Clan was noted for being poets and ollovs (learned people); Ua hAghmaill are hereditary chiefs of; Teallach Cathalain, Teallach Duibhbrailbe and Teallach Braenain / Glenconkeine, barony of Loughinsholin

Ó hÁdhmaill is a Gaelic Irish clan from Ulster. The name is now rendered in many forms, most commonly Hamill. The clan are a branch of Cenél nEógain (specifically, Cenél mBinnigh), belonging to the Uí Néill; they claim descent from Eochu Binneach, the son of Eógan mac Néill. Their descendants in Ireland are found predominantly across Ulster, and County Louth, Leinster.

In Irish if the second part of the surname begins with a vowel 'Á', the form Ó attaches a h to it, this is the h-prothesis mutation. In this case Ádhmaill becomes Ó hÁdhmaill. The other forms effect no change: Ní Adhmaill, (Bean) Uí Adhmaill.

Capitalised as: Ó hÁDHMAILL or Ó ʜÁDHMAILL, the first 'h' should always be either lowercase, or a smaller 'H' font size.

House	Male	Meaning	Anglicised	Wife	Daughter	Examples
Uí	Ó/Ua	descendant of	O'	Uí	Ní	Peadar Ó hAdhmaill, Aoife Uí Adhmaill (Aoife wife of Peadar), Róisín Ní Adhmaill (Róisín daughter of Peadar)

== Motto and Coat of Arms ==
The Motto is Esse Quam Videri, translated as To Be Rather Than To Seem.

The Slogan (battle cry) is "Vestigia nulla retrorsum", translated as No backward steps.

The Coat of Arms is described as being; A shield azure field with two horizontal bars of ermine fur. On top of the shield is a ducal coronet. Atop the coronet is the figure of a leopard in profile, sitting with its face to the viewer's left.

- The Azure/Blue represents Strength, Loyalty and Truth
- The Ermine is associated with the robes and crowns of Royal and Noble Personages
- Ducal Coronet is a crown of a duke
- Leopard in profile is traditionally depicted the same as a lion

== History ==
One of the leading clans of the Cenél mBinnigh, Cenél nEógain a branch of the Northern Uí Néill. They are descendants of Eochach Binnich mac Eógain, son of Eógan mac Néill, son of the fifth-century Néill Noígiallaig (Niall of the Nine Hostages), founder of the Uí Néill dynasty. Cenél mBinnigh where the first clan of the Cenél nEógain (Cenél nEóghain) to advance from Inishowen.

The O'Hamills continued to move from North Ulster with the Northern Ui Neill's, and ruled territory in County Tyrone and County Armagh, South Ulster.

- Hereditary Chief or Clan chief; Ua hAghmaill (O'Hamill), Teallach Duibhbrailbe.
- Cinéal (Kinship); Cenél nEógain (Cinel Eoghain).
- Finte (Clans); Ua Brolaigh, herenaghs of Tech na Coimairce and Clongleigh.
- Branches;
  - Cenél mBinnig Glinne in the valley of Glenconkeine, barony of Loughinsholin
  - Cenél mBindigh Locha Droichid east of Magh Ith in Tirone (County Tyrone)
  - Cenél mBindigh Tuaithe Rois and one branch of the Ua Brolaigh, east of the River Foyle and north of the barony of Loughinsholin
Family tree
- Niall Noi nGiallach - Néill Noígiallaig - Niall of the Nine Hostages
  - Eógan mac Néill - Eoghan mac Niall (Cenél nEógain - Cenél nEóghain - Cineál Eoghain)
    - Eochach Binnich mac Eógain - Och Binnigh mac Eoghan (Cenél mBinnigh - CineálnBinnigh)
      - Ua hAghmaill - Ó hÁdhmaill - O'Hamill

== Irish-English Hamill ==
Prior to the middle of the 20th century, Irish was usually written using the Gaelic typefaces, in this case the surname appeared as Ó hÁḋmaıll. The dot above the lenited letter (ḋ) was replaced by the letters dh from the standard Roman alphabet changing it to Ó hÁdhmaıll. Also the Irish language makes no graphemic distinction between dotted i and dotless ı so at the same time it changed to Ó hÁdhmaill.

As the dh is silent, the pronunciation is similar to spelling it as O'Hamill which is how it came to be spelt when it was phonetically anglicised, over time the spelling lost the O' and changed to Hamill, giving us the modern Irish-English spelling of Hamill.

== Notable people include ==
=== Historic ===
- Giolla Criost Ó hAdhmaill (died 1178), taoiseach of Clann Adhmaill, who was killed while fighting alongside Ruaidhrí Mac Duinnshléibhe, King of Ulaid, against John de Courcy in 1177.
- Ruarcan Ua hAdhmaill (died 1376), chief poet to the O'Hanlon lords of Orior. His death is recorded in both the Annals of the Four Masters and the Annals of Loch Cé.
- Pádraic Ó hAmuill (fl. 1642–1643), a Franciscan friar recorded in the contemporary Irish chronicle Cín Lae Ó Mealláin. In 1643 he was serving as a Franciscan confessor at Dungannon. Historian Gerry Oates identifies him as probably the "Friar Hammell" mentioned in the 1641 depositions and as a chaplain to the forces of Owen Roe O'Neill.

Other members of the family occur in late medieval and early modern records. In 1429, Turlough and Bryan O Hamill were named in the correspondence of Archbishop John Swayne after taking part in an attack on granges belonging to the Abbey of SS Peter and Paul at Armagh on behalf of a local O'Neill chieftain; they were subsequently excommunicated. At the end of the sixteenth century, Donnell Ó Hammoyle was recorded among the adherents of Rory O'Donnell. The form Ó Hammoyle is one of the historical anglicised spellings of the surname.

=== Irish revolutionary period (1913–1922) ===
- Peadar Ó hÁḋmaıll, Peter Hamill, Na Fianna Éireann 1st Brigade, 4th Northern Division, No. 5. Sec., Dún Dealgan
- Thomas Hamill (1878–1955), Irish Volunteers, 4 Battalion, Cycling Corps and Irish Republican Army, 1 Brigade, 4 Northern Division, Dundalk
- Thomas Hamill, Dunleer
- Thomas Hamill, Irish Volunteers and Irish Republican Army, Dublin. Served in 1 Battalion, G Company, Dublin Brigade.
- Thomas Hamill, Na Fianna Éireann, 1st Battalion Belfast Brigade
- William Hamill, Na Fianna Éireann, 3rd (Armagh) Brigade, 4th Northern Division, Armagh City Sluagh attached to Armagh City Batt.
- Barney Hamill, Na Fianna Éireann, 3rd (Armagh) Brigade, 4th Northern Division, Derrytrasna Sluagh attached to Lurgan Batt.
- George Hamill, Irish Republican Army (1919–1922), Lurgan Battalion, B Company Lurgan
- James Hamill, Irish Republican Army (1919–1922), Lurgan Battalion, C Company Derrymacash
- Thomas Hamill, Irish Republican Army (1919–1922), A Company, Dungannon Battalion, No. 1 Brigade, 2nd Northern Division
- James Hamill, Irish Republican Army (1919–1922), A Company, Dungannon Battalion, No. 1 Brigade, 2nd Northern Division
- John Hamill, Irish Republican Army (1919–1922), B Company, Dungannon Battalion, No. 1 Brigade, 2nd Northern Division
- James Hamill, Irish Republican Army (1919–1922), C Company, Dungannon Battalion, No. 1 Brigade, 2nd Northern Division
- John Hamill, Irish Republican Army (1919–1922), C Company, Dungannon Battalion, No. 1 Brigade, 2nd Northern Division
- Patrick Hamill, Irish Republican Army (1919–1922), D Company, Dungannon Battalion, No. 1 Brigade, 2nd Northern Division
- Arthur & Patrick Hamill, Irish Republican Army (1919–1922), D Company, Dungannon Battalion, No. 1 Brigade, 2nd Northern Division
- Michael Hamill, Irish Republican Army (1919–1922), F Company, Dungannon Battalion, No. 1 Brigade, 2nd Northern Division
- Francis Hamill, Irish Republican Army (1919–1922), G Company, Dungannon Battalion, No. 1 Brigade, 2nd Northern Division

=== Military ===
[Professional soldiers from other periods, e.g. British Army, Irish Defence Forces, US military, etc.]

- Sáir Seán Ó hÁmaill, Sgt. John Hamill (died Cyprus 7/4/1965), Memorial: Irish Army United Nations Service, located Section 40, South Section (E) of Glasnevin Cemetery.

=== Sport ===
- Tomás O’hAdhmaill, Tomás Hamill, Tipperary senior inter-county hurling team. Won his first Senior hurling All Ireland title when Tipperary defeated Kilkenny in the final.

=== Professional ===
- Judge William G.J. Hamill, Judge of the District Court
- Seán Ó hAdhmaill, Conradh na Gaeilge & Glór na nGael.
- Dr. Feilim O'Hadhmaill, Programme Director & Lecturer at University College Cork, in Applied Social Studies.
- Cormac Ó hÁdhmaill, BBC TV Presenter
- Éamonn Ó hAdhmaill, TV Presenter and editor
- Tara Uí Adhmaill, Educator, specialising in the teaching of Irish to adults with expertise in raising children with Irish and Co-Founder of Glór Mológa, an Irish language community group based in Dublin South Central.

== Notable people with Anglicised variants include ==
- Hamill Surname List
- Hammill Surname List

== Places ==
=== Munteramyl ===
A c. 1609–1610 map of part of the Barony of Dungannon. The territory of Munteramyl is named on the map.

Munteramyl (Irish: Muintir Adhmaill) was a historic territorial name in what is now County Tyrone. Gerry Oates identifies the name as meaning the "O Hamill progeny" and states that it appears on a 1610 barony map of Dungannon as a territory of approximately 50 townlands covering the northern half of the parish of Clonfeacle. The territory was within the wider lordship of the O'Neills of Tyrone.

The name is preserved on one of the maps produced during the survey of the escheated counties of Ulster in 1609–1610. The surviving Dungannon maps are attributed to Josias Bodley. A modern reconstruction of the late Gaelic estates by Laura Patrick also identifies Munteramyl among the estates associated with the O'Donnelly sept within the O'Neill lordship.

=== Knockamell ===
Knockamell (Irish: Cnoc Uí Ághmaill, "O'Hamill's Hill") is a former townland in Armagh associated with the Ó hÁdhmaill name. Early seventeenth-century spellings include Knockyamoyell, Kockamoyell and Knocke-Iamoyle. The site later became associated with Armagh Observatory; the Observatory archives preserve a plan entitled "Plan of Observatory site at Knockamell Townland", dated 3 October 1789.

=== Other places ===
- Hamill, South Dakota

== Variations ==
While Hamell in Irish is spelt Ó hÁmaill, it is often incorrectly used as the Irish version of Hamill.

Historical English-language forms of the surname include Hamill, Hammill, Hammell, Hamell and O'Hamill. The surname derives from the Gaelic Ó hÁdhmaill, also historically written Ó hÁghmaill, meaning "descendant of Ádhmall".

The archived Sloinne database associated Ó hÁdhmaill with Hamill, Hammill, Hammell, Hamell and O'Hamill, while a separate entry associated Ó hÁmaill specifically with Hamell.

The current Gaois Database of Irish-Language Surnames, however, names Ó hÁmaill as an Irish-language form corresponding to Hamill, and lists Ó hÁdhmaill as the historical Irish-language form.

== Unrelated names – same spelling ==
There are several surnames that are spelt the same but are unrelated:

- Some Scottish Hamill's are of Norman origin and are named after a location; Haineville or Henneville in Manche, France. Which itself was named from the Germanic personal name Hagano and the Old French ville for 'settlement'.
- The English Hamill's of Saxon origin are named after a nickname from Middle English, and the Old English "hamel".
- The English/Scottish Hamilton's are named after a location; the village of Hamilton, Leicestershire, England.
