= Hyannis, Massachusetts =

Hyannis
- Village
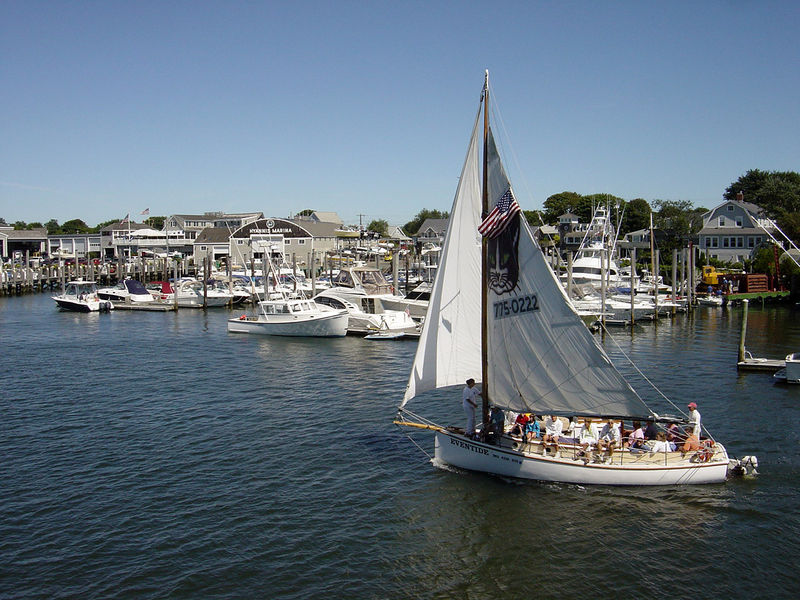
- A sailboat in Hyannis Harbor

- Location of ZIP Code 02601 Hyannis within the Town of Barnstable, county, and state
- Coordinates: 41°39′10″N 70°17′0″W
- Country: United States
- State: Massachusetts
- County: Barnstable
- Town: Barnstable

Area
  - Total: 9.40 sq mi (24.34 km^{2})
  - Land: 8.60 sq mi (22.27 km^{2})
  - Water: 0.80 sq mi (2.07 km^{2})

Population (2010)
  - Total: 14,089
  - Density: 1,638.6/sq mi (632.65/km^{2})
- Time zone: UTC−5 (Eastern (EST))
  - Summer (DST): UTC−4 (EDT)
- ZIP Code: 02601
- Area code: 508 / 774
- FIPS code: 25-31820
- GNIS feature ID: 619333

Hyannis /ˌhaɪˈænɪs/ is the largest of the seven villages in the town of Barnstable, Massachusetts, United States. It is the commercial and transportation hub of Cape Cod and was designated an urban area at the 1990 census. Because of this, many refer to Hyannis as the "Capital of the Cape". It contains a majority of the Barnstable town offices and two important shopping districts: the historic downtown Main Street and the Route 132 Commercial District, including Cape Cod Mall and Independence Park, headquarters of Cape Cod Potato Chips. Cape Cod Hospital in Hyannis is the largest medical facility on Cape Cod.

Hyannis is a major tourist destination and the primary ferry boat and general aviation link for passengers and freight to Nantucket Island. Hyannis also provides secondary passenger access to the island of Martha's Vineyard, with the primary passenger access to Martha's Vineyard being located in Woods Hole, a village in the nearby town of Falmouth. Due to its large natural harbor, Hyannis is the largest recreational boating and second largest commercial fishing port on Cape Cod, behind only Provincetown.

The village is the namesake of the former United States Naval ship USS Hyannis (YTB-817).

== History ==
The village was named after Iyannough, a sachem of the Cummaquid band of the Wampanoag tribe.

== Climate ==
Hyannis has an ocean-moderated humid continental climate (Dfb under Köppen), which is close to an oceanic climate (Cfb). Summers are even closer to Dfa, or Cfa, a humid subtropical climate, under 1991 to 2020 normals.

Climate data for Hyannis, Massachusetts (1991–2020 normals, extremes 1893–present)
Month	Jan	Feb	Mar	Apr	May	Jun	Jul	Aug	Sep	Oct	Nov	Dec	Year
Record high °F (°C)	65 (18)	67 (19)	78 (26)	91 (33)	93 (34)	97 (36)	98 (37)	100 (38)	95 (35)	85 (29)	74 (23)	66 (19)	100 (38)
Mean maximum °F (°C)	54.1 (12.3)	54.8 (12.7)	60.2 (15.7)	70.4 (21.3)	79.6 (26.4)	84.4 (29.1)	89.8 (32.1)	86.9 (30.5)	82.1 (27.8)	75.0 (23.9)	65.9 (18.8)	58.0 (14.4)	90.9 (32.7)
Mean daily maximum °F (°C)	38.8 (3.8)	39.7 (4.3)	44.2 (6.8)	53.5 (11.9)	62.7 (17.1)	71.5 (21.9)	78.1 (25.6)	77.0 (25.0)	71.1 (21.7)	61.2 (16.2)	52.1 (11.2)	43.8 (6.6)	57.8 (14.3)
Daily mean °F (°C)	30.5 (−0.8)	31.6 (−0.2)	36.9 (2.7)	45.9 (7.7)	55.1 (12.8)	64.3 (17.9)	71.1 (21.7)	70.1 (21.2)	63.8 (17.7)	53.6 (12.0)	44.5 (6.9)	36.2 (2.3)	50.3 (10.2)
Mean daily minimum °F (°C)	22.3 (−5.4)	23.5 (−4.7)	29.6 (−1.3)	38.3 (3.5)	47.6 (8.7)	57.0 (13.9)	64.2 (17.9)	63.2 (17.3)	56.5 (13.6)	45.9 (7.7)	36.9 (2.7)	28.6 (−1.9)	42.8 (6.0)
Mean minimum °F (°C)	4.9 (−15.1)	8.5 (−13.1)	15.3 (−9.3)	28.1 (−2.2)	37.2 (2.9)	47.1 (8.4)	55.3 (12.9)	54.4 (12.4)	44.2 (6.8)	32.9 (0.5)	23.0 (−5.0)	14.9 (−9.5)	3.4 (−15.9)
Record low °F (°C)	−8 (−22)	−12 (−24)	−3 (−19)	9 (−13)	24 (−4)	31 (−1)	42 (6)	34 (1)	26 (−3)	9 (−13)	7 (−14)	−9 (−23)	−12 (−24)
Average precipitation inches (mm)	3.71 (94)	3.56 (90)	4.77 (121)	4.00 (102)	3.42 (87)	3.33 (85)	2.77 (70)	3.24 (82)	3.83 (97)	4.29 (109)	4.07 (103)	4.68 (119)	45.67 (1,160)
Average snowfall inches (cm)	9.5 (24)	6.3 (16)	3.6 (9.1)	0.0 (0.0)	0.0 (0.0)	0.0 (0.0)	0.0 (0.0)	0.0 (0.0)	0.0 (0.0)	0.0 (0.0)	0.0 (0.0)	2.1 (5.3)	21.5 (55)
Average precipitation days (≥ 0.01 in)	10.4	9.5	10.4	10.8	10.1	8.5	6.7	7.6	7.7	9.9	9.7	11.8	113.1
Average snowy days (≥ 0.1 in)	2.3	2.3	1.4	0.1	0.0	0.0	0.0	0.0	0.0	0.0	0.1	0.9	7.1
Source: NOAA

== Drinking water ==
In 2007, the city water was found to contain perchlorate. In 2009, Barnstable public works requested that the fire academy cease their operations. In 2010, Well MD2 had been shut down "until contamination issues caused by the Fire Training Academy [were] addressed".

In April 2015, the town's Mary Dunn wellfield near a fire training academy was found to be contaminated with perfluorooctane sulfonate, and well use was suspended until costly emergency filtration with two carbon treatment units could be started. Two wells, at Hyannisport and West Hyannisport, were closed.

A six-month overland interconnection with Yarmouth's water system was suggested in May and constructed in June 2015. In November 2015, the county suspended the Barnstable County Fire and Rescue Training Academy which is up gradient of the wells. but in February 2016, it still remained open.

In May 2016, the City of Barnstable issued a drinking water health advisory, for PFOS and perfluorooctanoic acid (PFOA) of 0.18 parts per billion in the Mary Dunn #3 well, which was taken offline.

== Demographics ==
In 2010, Hyannis had a total population of 14,089, living in 8,406 households. 19.80% of Hyannis' total 10,922 housing units were seasonally vacant. Hyannis had relatively more multi-family properties in comparison to the town and the county. Hyannis had an owner-occupancy rate of 58.3%, which was nearly 20 percentage points lower than the town or the county. This difference is associated primarily with the number of apartment properties in the village. A decline in younger, family formation households was attributed to the lack of suitable employment opportunities and "affordable" housing. The median value of owner-occupied housing units in Hyannis in 2000 was $149,720. The gross median rent in Hyannis was $718/month. In 2002, the median price for a single family home in Hyannis was $196,000.

Median head of household income was $38,467. 15.9% of households earned more than $75,000. 14.6% of Hyannis population lived below the poverty line. 18.74% were over 65 years old. Unemployment in Hyannis was 3.8% of the labor force. Hyannis is growing at the upper end and the lower end of the age cohorts, and although there has been an increase in persons 25 to 44 years of age, this has not necessarily been reflected in income change, as Hyannis witnessed an increase in the number of households earning $10,000 to $15,000 and an increase in the number of persons and families below the poverty level.

== Education ==
Hyannis is home to Barnstable High School, the largest high school on Cape Cod. The school serves students in grades 8-12 and has an approximate enrollment of 2,400. Other high schools include Sturgis Charter Public School, a charter school featuring the International Baccalaureate program, and Pope John Paul II High School, the first and only college preparatory Catholic high school on Cape Cod. It is a part of the Roman Catholic Diocese of Fall River. Trinity Christian Academy, which recently opened a high school, is also located in Hyannis. Saint Francis Xavier Preparatory School is a prep middle school. Cape Cod Community College, in nearby West Barnstable, is a two-year community college, known locally as "4-C's".

== Transportation ==
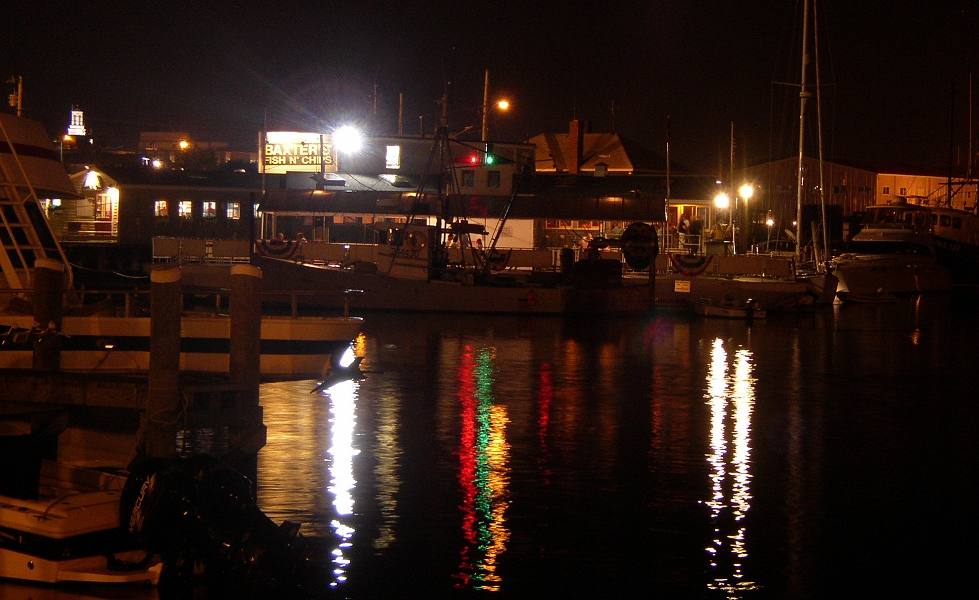
Hyannis Harbor at night

Hyannis is the main point of origin for ferry service to Nantucket. The Steamship Authority runs a year-round two and a half hour auto ferry service to Nantucket. The island can also be reached by a passenger-only, one-hour catamaran trip run by the Steamship Authority (seasonal) and Hy-Line Cruises (year-round). Hy-Line also runs a catamaran to Martha's Vineyard in season. One of the world's first Roll-On and Roll-Off ferries, the Searoad of Hyannis operated in 1956 from Hyannis to Nantucket, with the capability to transport three loaded semi-trailers in any weather.

Barnstable Municipal Airport (Airport code HYA) is the main air transportation hub for Cape Cod, with daily flights to Martha's Vineyard, Nantucket, Boston, Provincetown, and New York City. The airport is served by Cape Air (year-round) and JetBlue (in-season).

The Hyannis Transportation Center (HTC) is the main bus and rail terminal on Cape Cod. The HTC services is a terminal station for Cape Cod Regional Transit Authority, the operator of the Cape-wide public bus network on Cape Cod, intercity buses operated by the Plymouth & Brockton and Peter Pan bus lines, and the seasonal CapeFlyer passenger rail service which operates between Boston and Hyannis Friday-Sunday in-season.

The Cape Cod Central Railroad operates seasonal tourist excursions from Hyannis to Sandwich and Sagamore, with some scheduled weekend stops at West Barnstable.

Freight rail service is provided by the Massachusetts Coastal Railroad.

== Points of interest ==
- Hyannis Harbor
- Kennedy Compound
- John F. Kennedy Hyannis Museum
- John F. Kennedy Memorial
- Massachusetts Air and Space Museum

== Sports ==
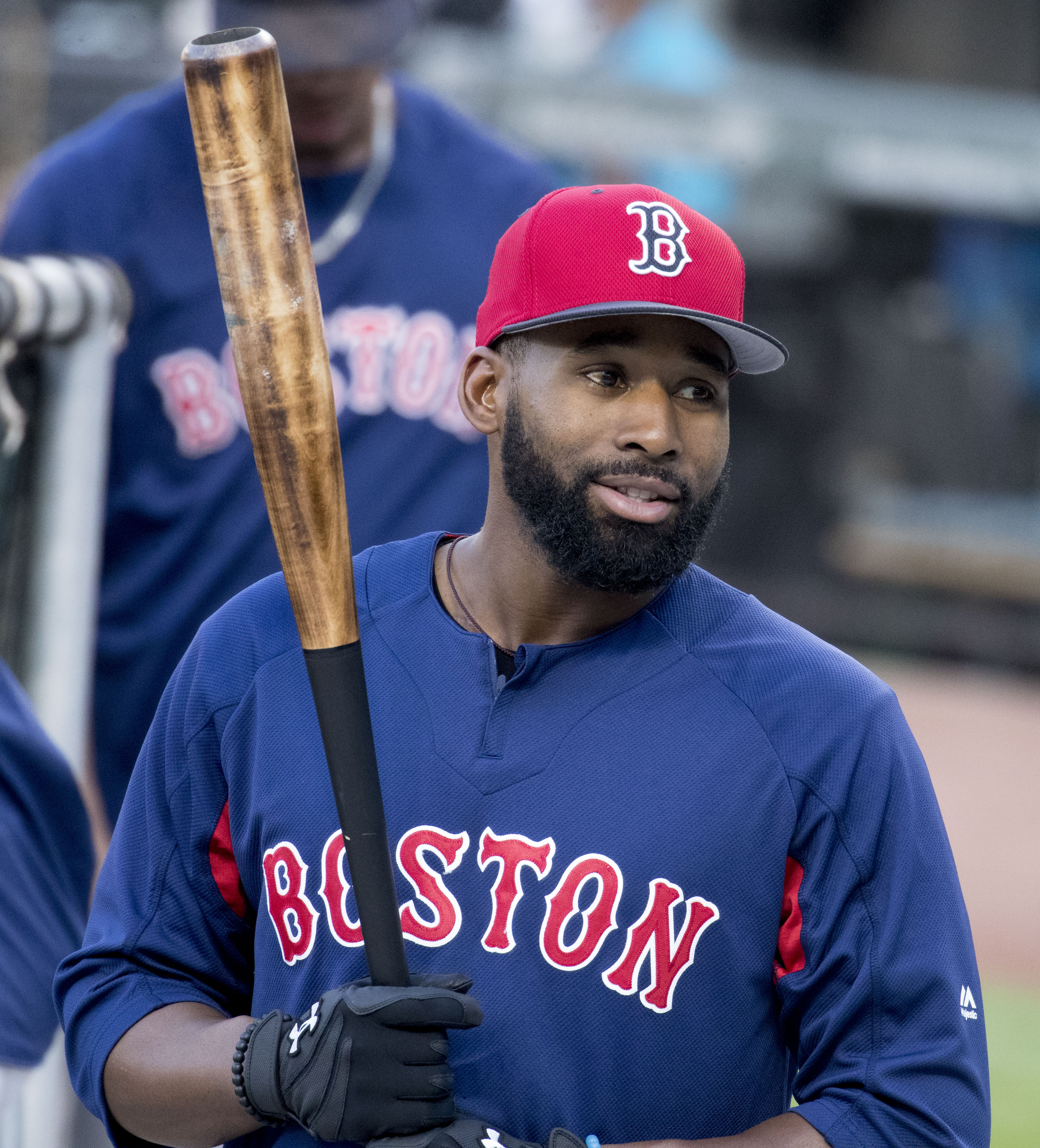
Jackie Bradley Jr. played for the Hyannis Harbor Hawks in 2011.

Hyannis is home to the Hyannis Harbor Hawks, an amateur collegiate summer baseball team in the Cape Cod Baseball League. The team plays at McKeon Park, and has featured dozens of players who went on to careers in Major League Baseball, such as Robin Ventura, Jackie Bradley Jr., and Jason Varitek.

== Notable people ==
- John Alvin, cinematic artist and painter who illustrated some of the world's most recognizable movie posters
- Raymond Arsenault, specialist in the political, social, and environmental history of the American South
- Henry Askeli, journalist, labor activist and therapist
- Demetrius Atsalis, member of Massachusetts House of Representatives
- Zered Bassett, professional skateboarder
- Mike Gilmartin, football player
- Edward Gleason, Olympic gold medal winner
- Jim Hallet, golfer who at the 1983 Masters Tournament opened with a 68, then the second-lowest amateur round in Masters history
- Greg Jerman, NFL player
- Amy Jo Johnson, Actress
- John C. Klimm, member of Massachusetts House of Representatives
- Dan LaCouture, professional hockey player
- Harriet Bacon MacDonald, pianist, music educator, concert promoter
- Peter McDowell, member of Massachusetts House of Representatives
- Eric Nickulas, NHL player
- Paul Pena, wrote the song "Jet Airliner", a 1977 hit for the Steve Miller Band
- Jason Peirce, actor
- Robert Richardson, won the Academy Award for Best Cinematography three times for his work on JFK, The Aviator, and Hugo
- Casey Sherman, true crime author and journalist
- Douglas Whynott, writer
- Johnny Wright, manager of New Kids on the Block, Backstreet Boys, *NSYNC, Jonas Brothers, Menudo, Janet Jackson, Justin Timberlake, Britney Spears, Stevie Brock, and Ciara
- Kevin Wylie, professional soccer player

== See also ==
- Hyannis Port, Massachusetts
