= Alex Hamill =

Alex Hamill may refer to:

- Alex Hamill (footballer, born 1961), Scottish footballer
- Alex Hamill (footballer, born 1912), Scottish footballer
