= Peter McNamee =

Peter McNamee may refer to:

- Peter McNamee (ice hockey) (born 1950)
- Peter McNamee (footballer) (1935–2021)
