= McNamee =

McNamee is a surname of Irish origin. The original Gaelic version, Mac Conmidhe means "Son of the hound of Meath".

McNamee may refer to:

- Ann McNamee (born 1953), American singer-songwriter
- Anthony McNamee (born 1983), English footballer
- Bernard McNamee, American government official
- Bernie McNamee, the co-host of The World at Six, the Canadian Broadcasting Corporation
- Brian McNamee, former New York City police officer, personal trainer, and strength and conditioning coach in Major League Baseball
- Candace McNamee (born 1980), American volleyball player
- Charles Joseph McNamee (1890–1964), American federal judge
- Danny McNamee (born 1960) electronic engineer from Northern Ireland, convicted of terrorist bomb-making offences but later acquitted after 10 years imprisonment
- David McNamee (born 1980), Scottish footballer
- Eoin McNamee (Kilkeel, County Down, 1961), Irish writer
- Eoin McNamee (Irish republican), IRA chief of staff
- Frank McNamee (1906–1968), Justice of the Supreme Court of Nevada
- Ged McNamee (born 1960), English footballer
- Gerard McNamee (born 1969), American actor
- Gerry McNamee (1934–1984), Canadian Olympic swimmer
- Graham McNamee (1888–1942), American radio broadcaster
- Jessica McNamee (born 1986), Australian actress
- Joe McNamee (1926–2011), American professional basketball player
- John McNamee (1941–2024), Scottish footballer
- John H. H. McNamee (1853–1936), American businessman and mayor of Cambridge, Massachusetts
- Kay McNamee (1931–2022), Canadian Olympic swimmer
- Luke McNamee (1871–1952), American admiral and Governor of Guam
- Mark McNamee (born 1999), Irish American football player
- Niall McNamee (born 1985), Irish footballer
- Pat McNamee, nationalist politician in Northern Ireland
- Paul McNamee (born 1954), retired Australian tennis player and prominent sports administrator
- Penny McNamee (born 1983), Australian actress
- Peter McNamee (footballer) (born 1935), Scottish footballer
- Peter McNamee (ice hockey) (born 1950), Canadian ice hockey forward
- Ray McNamee (1895–1949), Australian cricketer
- Roger McNamee (born 1956), founding partner of the venture capital firm Elevation Partners
- Ronan McNamee (born 1991), Irish footballer
- Ruth McNamee (1921–2016), American politician
- Sheila McNamee, American academic
- Stephen M. McNamee (born 1942), American federal judge
- Thomas McNamee (born 1947), American writer
- Wally McNamee (1932–2017), American photojournalist
- William McNamee (1891–1935), Scottish footballer
