= John F. Kennedy Hyannis Museum =

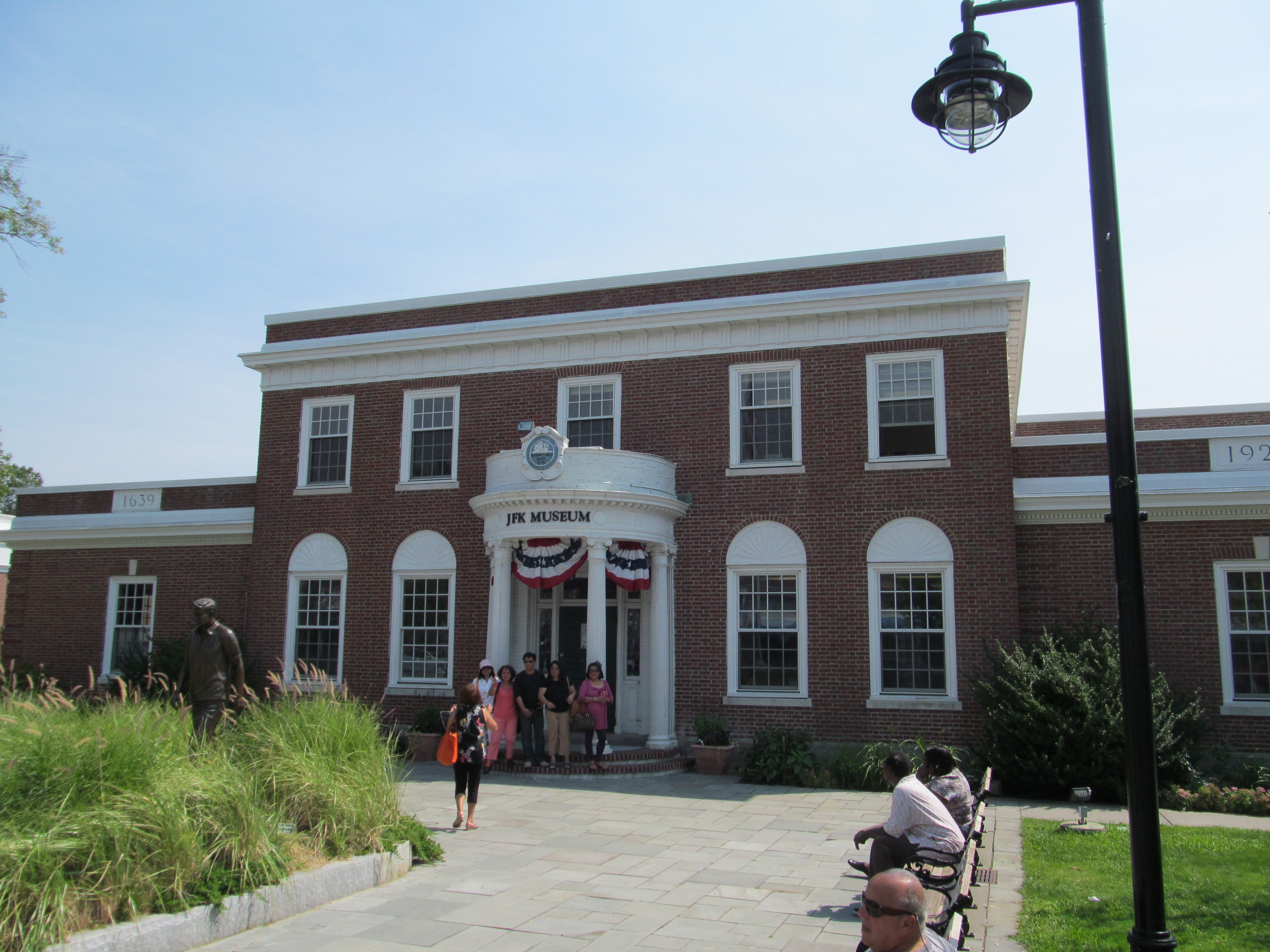
- Location: Hyannis, Massachusetts
- Coordinates: 41.652300°N 70.284176°W
- Website: jfkhyannismuseum.org/

The John F. Kennedy Hyannis Museum is a historical museum located at 397 Main Street Hyannis, Massachusetts. The museum includes a thematic panorama of photographs, archival films, artifacts, text panels, and oral histories of John F. Kennedy and his family.

The museum is housed in the former Hyannis Town Hall building. The building was occupied by the town until the 1980s, when the town offices were moved to the building that once housed Hyannis State Normal School. From 2008 to 2017, the basement of the museum housed the Cape Cod Baseball League hall of fame and museum.

== See also ==
- List of memorials to John F. Kennedy
