= Craig Hignett =

English footballer and manager

Personal information
- Date of birth: 12 January 1970 (age 56)
- Place of birth: Whiston, Lancashire, England
- Positions: Midfielder; striker

Youth career
- 1986–1988: Liverpool

Senior career*
Years	Team	Apps	(Gls)
1988–1992	Crewe Alexandra	121	(42)
1992–1992	Stafford Rangers (loan)	14	(?)
1992–1998	Middlesbrough	155	(33)
1998	Aberdeen	13	(2)
1998–2000	Barnsley	66	(28)
2000–2003	Blackburn Rovers	53	(8)
2002	→ Coventry City (loan)	8	(2)
2003–2004	Leicester City	13	(1)
2004	→ Crewe Alexandra (loan)	15	(0)
2004	Leeds United	0	(0)
2004–2005	Darlington	19	(9)
2005–2006	Apollon Limassol	11	(0)
2006–2007	Spennymoor United	0	(0)
2007	Hartlepool United	2	(0)
- Billingham Synthonia
Total		463	(125)

Managerial career
- 2013–2014: Hartlepool United (assistant)
- 2014: Middlesbrough (assistant)
- 2016–2017: Hartlepool United
- 2018: Hartlepool United (caretaker)
- 2019: Hartlepool United
- * Club domestic league appearances and goals

Craig Hignett (born 12 January 1970) is an English former professional footballer who played as a striker and later in his career as a midfielder.

Born in Whiston, he started his senior club career with Crewe Alexandra in 1988. After making 150 appearances for Crewe, he moved to Middlesbrough in 1992. He played for Middlesbrough in both the FA Cup and League Cup finals in 1996–97 as Boro finished as runners-up on both occasions. Hignett was the first player to score at Middlesbrough's new ground, the Riverside Stadium and also won two promotions to the Premier League with the club. He left Middlesbrough in 1998 and had a brief spell with Aberdeen before moving to Barnsley. In his second season, Hignett was named as Barnsley's Player of the Season as well as being named in the First Division PFA Team of the Year. He signed for Blackburn Rovers in 2000 and was a member of the team that won the League Cup in 2001–02. After a loan spell with Coventry City, he moved to Leicester City in 2003. He returned to Crewe Alexandra on loan in 2004. Hignett subsequently had brief spells with Leeds United, Darlington, Apollon Limassol, Spennymoor United, Hartlepool United and Billingham Synthonia.

He began his coaching career at Middlesbrough's academy in 2008. Ahead of the 2013–14 season, he was named as Hartlepool United's assistant manager but moved to Middlesbrough to become their assistant manager later that season. He left Middlesbrough in December 2014. Hignett was named as Hartlepool's first-team manager in February 2016 but was sacked in January 2017. He returned to the club again as Director of Football in 2018 and became manager again in January 2019 before departing in October 2019.

== Playing career ==
Born in Whiston and previously a trainee at Liverpool, Hignett began his senior career with Crewe Alexandra in 1988, making his debut in a goal-less Fourth Division match at Wrexham on 8 October 1988. During the 1989–90 season, he scored his first league goal in a 3–2 defeat by Swansea City at Gresty Road on 7 October 1989, and began to make more regular appearances, notching six more goals. On 30 April 1991, he scored his first hat-trick as Crewe beat Rotherham United 3–0 at Gresty Road, and on 14 November 1992 he hit four in his penultimate club appearance as Crewe beat Wrexham 6–1 in an FA Cup first round tie, also at Gresty Road. He made 150 first team appearances for Crewe, scoring 57 goals, before being sold to Middlesbrough for £500,000 on 27 November 1992. The club rejected a £350,000 offer from Port Vale in 1994.

After the club were relegated in his first season with Middlesbrough, he helped them back up two seasons later. In 1996–97 Hignett again suffered relegation with Middlesbrough and was part of the team that lost in the FA Cup final and League Cup final the same season. He had however made sure of a place in the club's history by scoring the first goal at the Riverside Stadium, their new ground, in a 2–0 win over Chelsea at the start of 1995–96 Season.

Hignett also took a pay cut to stay at the club at one point, in stark contrast to the many big-name signings Middlesbrough were bringing in at the time. In 1998 he left Middlesbrough to sign for Aberdeen on a free transfer, having made 194 appearances and 48 goals for Boro. His stay at Aberdeen was short lived, only lasting six months, before signing for Barnsley for £800,000 in 1999.

After suffering relegation from the Premiership, Barnsley were looking for a quick return to the top flight and Hignett's 20 goals in his second season at Oakwell helped them reach the play-off final of the 1999–2000 season. Hignett scored once in the final but Barnsley lost 4–2 to Ipswich Town. It was initially thought Hignett had scored twice but the other goal was eventually attributed to an own goal by Richard Wright after Hignett's shot rebounded off the crossbar and in off Wright. He was named as Barnsley's Player of the Season at the end of the 1999–2000 season. Additionally, Hignett was named in the PFA Team of the Year for the First Division.

Hignett left Barnsley in 2000 after 66 appearances and 35 goals for the club; he signed for Blackburn Rovers for a fee of £2.2 million. He helped Rovers regain their Premiership status and won a League Cup winners medal when Blackburn beat Tottenham Hotspur 2–1 in the 2002 final, with Hignett coming off the bench in the 77th minute.

However, in the 2002–03 season he only played three league games and one UEFA Cup game; Hignett was sent on loan to Coventry City halfway through the season but suffered a hairline fracture of his leg at Bramall Lane on 28 December 2002 which ended his loan spell. After returning, he scored on the final day of the season which was to prove to be his last appearance for Blackburn Rovers. He played 68 times and scored 14 goals for Rovers before being released.

In 2003, he signed for Leicester City but struggled to get in the side, making only 15 appearances before going on loan back to Crewe Alexandra at the end of the 2003–04 season and playing another 15 games. He only scored once during his time at Leicester but it was a memorable goal: a crucial injury time equaliser against Arsenal.

In 2004 he had a brief stint at Leeds United before signing for Darlington, where he scored on his debut.

In Summer 2005 he signed a contract with Apollon Limassol in Cyprus playing 12 games leading the Limassol side to its 3rd Championship as the only undefeated team in Europe.

On 22 March 2007, Hartlepool United signed Hignett on a short-term contract. Hignett had been training with the club and had taken part in Reserve Team fixtures prior to signing up permanently. He left the club in May 2007. He subsequently joined Billingham Synthonia, for whom he made four appearances during the 2008–09 season, scoring two goals.

In September 2007 Hignett starred in Sky1's Premier League All Stars, in which he helped Middlesbrough beat West Ham United in the final.

== Coaching career ==
As of April 2008 he was part of the academy coaching staff at Middlesbrough. He was linked with the Darlington job after Colin Todd was sacked, he was again rumoured after Steve Staunton was sacked.

In May 2013, Hignett became assistant manager at Hartlepool United alongside Colin Cooper. Hignett had a successful stint at Hartlepool, helping to lead the club to 9th before leaving for Middlesbrough in March 2014 to work as Aitor Karanka's assistant. On 2 December 2014, Middlesbrough announced that Hignett had parted company with the club. The statement explained that, "Following discussions between Craig, Head Coach Aitor Karanka, and the club, all parties have agreed for Craig to leave his position with immediate effect." Hignett was widely praised for having a hugely influential role in the upturns of Boro's fortunes, which had seen them challenging for promotion that season.

In February 2016, Hignett was appointed first-team manager of Hartlepool United following the departure of Ronnie Moore. His first game as Pools boss came in a 2–1 home win against Yeovil Town. Hignett's arrival saw an upturn in form and an unbeaten run of seven games in March saw Hartlepool rise from 22nd to a respectable finishing position of 16th in League Two.

Hignett's start to the 2016–17 season was solid if unspectacular. While Hartlepool lost just two of their opening twelve league games, they had not won a home game and had drawn six. October was an especially disappointing month for the team, surrendering seven points from winning positions, the most notable of which being throwing away a two-goal lead to lose 3–2 defeat at Barnet. Hartlepool's form never recovered and he was sacked on 15 January 2017 following a 1–0 defeat at Crawley Town. Hartlepool were in 19th position, four points clear of the relegation zone. Hartlepool were later relegated at the end of the 2016–17 season.

Hignett returned to Hartlepool in March 2018 as the club's Director of Football. Following the dismissal of Matthew Bates in November 2018, Hignett took temporary charge of the first team in addition to his role as director of football. Although Richard Money took charge in December 2018, he was later moved to a senior position before departing and Hignett was reinstated as first-team manager on 23 January 2019. On 10 October 2019, Hignett was sacked alongside coach Ged McNamee, his dismissal was viewed with surprise from some fans.

In January 2024, it was announced Hignett had been appointed as Head of Development at Guisborough Town.

== Personal life ==
In June 2013, Craig Hignett joined former footballer Colin Cooper and Sky Sports presenter Jeff Stelling and 12 other intrepid explorers to climb the 5,895m summit of Africa's highest mountain, Mount Kilimanjaro, to raise vital cash for the Finlay Cooper Fund in aid of children's charities. At the beginning of 2023, Hignett became the Honorary President for the Hartlepool United Supporters' Trust.

== Media career ==
Hignett provides commentary and punditry for BBC Radio Tees and BBC Radio Merseyside. He is also a regular after dinner speaker. Hignet also hosts the Yer Joking Aren't Ya? podcast alongside fellow Boro alumni, David Wheater.

== Managerial statistics ==
As of match played 9 October 2019

Managerial record by team and tenure
Team	From	To	Record					Ref
Team	From	To	P	W	D	L	Win %	Ref
Hartlepool United	10 February 2016	15 January 2017	52	15	12	25	28.8	
Hartlepool United (caretaker)	28 November 2018	11 December 2018	2	1	0	1	50.0	
Hartlepool United	23 January 2019	10 October 2019	32	11	10	11	34.4	
Total			86	27	22	37	31.4	—

== Honours ==
Middlesbrough

- Football League First Division: 1994–95; runner-up: 1997–98
- FA Cup runner-up: 1996–97
- Football League Cup runner-up: 1996–97

Blackburn Rovers

- Football League Cup: 2001–02

Individual

- PFA Team of the Year: 1999–2000 First Division
- Barnsley Player of the Year: 1999–2000
