= McKeon Park =

Baseball venue in Hyannis, Massachusetts

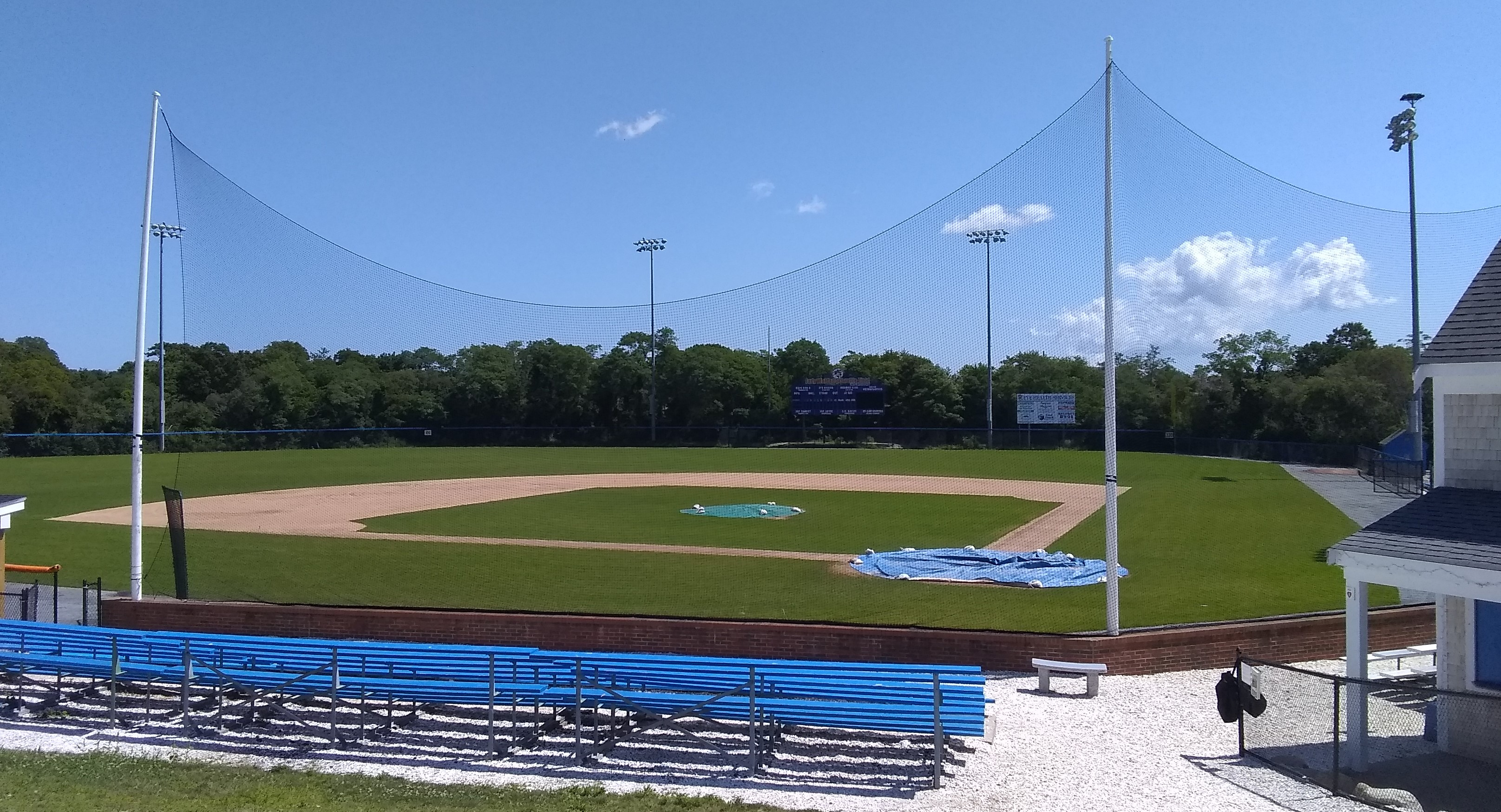
- Interactive map of McKeon Park
- Full name: Judy Walden Scarafile Field at McKeon Park
- Address: 120 High School Road
- Location: Hyannis, Massachusetts
- Coordinates: 41°38′53.80″N 70°17′0.51″W
- Capacity: 3,000
- Surface: Grass
- Field size: Left Field: 320 ft Center Field: 394 ft Right Field: 324 ft

Construction
- Opened: 1979
- Renovated: 2019

Tenant
- Hyannis Harbor Hawks

McKeon Park is a baseball venue in Hyannis, Massachusetts, home to the Hyannis Harbor Hawks of the Cape Cod Baseball League (CCBL). The Hawks play on Judy Walden Scarafile Field located at McKeon Park. Saint John Paul II High School is located just to the west of the field in the old Barnstable High School building.

Located in downtown Hyannis not far from Hyannis Harbor, the field originally served the adjacent former Barnstable High School and later Junior High School. It served as home to the Barnstable Townies Grid Club (Football) until its dissolution in 1950 at which point it became home to the Barnstable Townies Baseball Club. The field was reconstructed in the late 1970s to play host to the CCBL's Hyannis Mets franchise, which joined the league in 1976. While under construction, the team played at the new Barnstable High School field. The renovated park was slated to open for the 1978 CCBL season, but unforeseen drainage problems caused a delay. The park was finally opened for the 1979 season, and was dedicated in memory of the first Secretary-Treasurer of the originally named Barnstable Townies Baseball Club, and longtime Barnstable school committee member and athletic booster John McKeon. Son K.C. McKeon threw the opening pitch during the inaugural game.

Permanent lighting was first installed at McKeon prior to the 1985 season. Ospreys have routinely nested atop the light stanchions since at least 1992, and their gametime activity has come to be seen as symbolic of the unique flavor of baseball on Cape Cod. By 1995, the lights had come into disrepair, and the Mets were forced to abandon night games at the park. The deteriorating state of the park was the subject of heated town debate in 1997, with various proposals considered to either renovate the park, or redevelop the land for other purposes.

In 2006, the CCBL received a sizeable Yawkey Foundation grant for upgrades to McKeon Park. Together with matching fund donations secured by the Hyannis Athletic Association, the grant allowed the team to install new lighting prior to the 2008 season, complete with an osprey platform inviting the return of the team's unofficial mascots. In late 2008, Major League Baseball announced that it would enforce its trademarks, and required those CCBL teams who shared a nickname with an MLB team to either change their nicknames or buy their uniforms and merchandise only through MLB-licensed vendors. In response, the Hyannis club opted to drop its "Mets" moniker prior to the 2010 season, and became the Harbor Hawks. The choice of name was an homage to the osprey, which is also known as a "fish hawk" or "sea hawk", and in a fitting and timely gesture, an osprey pair at last took up residence on the new platform just prior to the start of the 2010 season.

In 2011, the Harbor Hawks dedicated the field house at McKeon Park in honor of Massachusetts state senator Jack Aylmer, who had been instrumental in the franchise's 1976 founding. In 2016, the field at McKeon Park was named in honor of longtime CCBL president Judy Walden Scarafile. The Harbor Hawks completed a major rehabilitation project of the park prior to the 2019 season, erecting a new scoreboard, and completely stripping, replacing and regrading the field to install sprinklers and improve drainage and field conditions.

McKeon Park hosted the CCBL all-star game festivities in 1997 and 2005, and has seen Hyannis claim three CCBL titles, most recently in 1991. The ballpark has been the summertime home of dozens of future major leaguers and managers such as Robin Ventura, Jackie Bradley Jr., Buck Showalter and Jason Varitek.

== See also ==
- Cape Cod Baseball League
- Hyannis Harbor Hawks
