= No Moccasin Creek =

River in South Dakota, United States

Coordinates: 43°43′11″N 99°44′05″W

No Moccasin Creek is a tributary of the White River in Tripp County, South Dakota, United States. It intersects the off-reservation trust land of the Rosebud Indian Reservation and terminates about 9 miles (14.9 km) north of Hamill, South Dakota.

No Moccasin Creek has the name of Chief No Moccasin, a Brulé Indian who settled there.

== See also ==
- List of rivers of South Dakota
