= Douglas Whynott =

American writer (born 1950)

- Born: 1950 (age 75–76); Hyannis, Massachusetts, U.S.
- Education: New England College; Stockholm University; University of Massachusetts Amherst (BA)
- Occupation: Writer
- Writing career
- Genre: Non-fiction

Douglas Whynott (born 1950) is an American writer who has written five critically acclaimed books of narrative nonfiction. The subjects of his books range from migratory commercial beekeepers and the beekeeping industry, to the bluefin tuna fishery in New England, a boatyard in Maine, a veterinary clinic in New Hampshire, and the maple syrup industry. In his early years Whynott worked as a dolphin trainer, fish curator, piano tuner, apiary inspector, track coach, and blues piano player.

== Career ==
Whynott was born in Hyannis, Massachusetts, in 1950. He worked as a piano tuner while attending college and was the concert tuner at the University of Massachusetts Amherst Fine Arts Center in Amherst, Massachusetts from 1976 to 1986. His first book, Following the Bloom, was begun as a graduate student when he worked for a summer as a Massachusetts apiary inspector and met a commercial migratory beekeeper named Andy Card. His second book, Giant Bluefin, tells the story of two years in the giant bluefin tuna fishery on Cape Cod and New England, from the vantage point of harpoon boats and focusing on the economics of the fishery, the Japanese markets, and federal government stock assessments. A Unit of Water, A Unit of Time tells the story of the construction of three sailboats at a boatyard in Brooklin, Maine owned by Joel White, the son of E. B. White, and accounts for when White was creating his final masterpiece, a 76-foot racing sloop. A Country Practice is the chronicle of two years at a veterinary clinic in Walpole, New Hampshire that examines the difficulties and pleasures of working at a rural, mixed animal practice. The Sugar Season chronicles the maple syrup industry in 2012, the warmest year in history at that time and tells the story of Bruce Bascom, one of the world's most successful maple syrup producers. The Sugar Season won the Green Book Festival Award for writing about the changing environment and was selected as one of the best books of 2014 by the Boston Globe.

According to Norman Sims, in True Stories , a history of literary journalism, Whynott is “an acknowledged master of the literary journalism of everyday life. Whynott spends a great deal of time with people, discovers their narratives, and then structures his stories so readers can identify with the characters." Whynott has taught writing and literature at the University of Massachusetts in Amherst, Mount Holyoke College, the MFA Nonfiction Writing Program at Columbia University, and is professor emeritus in the Writing, Literature and Publishing Program at Emerson College.

In 2013, Whynott was a Fulbright Scholar at Universidad Nacional de Colombia US Studies Center in Bogota, Colombia, where he taught American narrative nonfiction writing and literary journalism.

== Education ==
Whynott attended Dennis-Yarmouth High School in Yarmouth, Massachusetts. He attended New England College, the Stockholm University, Sweden, and in 1977 received a BA in journalism from the University of Massachusetts, Amherst. He received a master's degree in creative writing from the MFA Program for Poets & Writers at the University of Massachusetts in Amherst in 1985.

== Books published ==
Whynott is the author of:

- Following the Bloom—Across America with the Migratory Beekeepers (1991)
- Giant Bluefin (1995)
- A Unit of Water, A Unit of Time—Joel White's Last Boat (1999)
- A Country Practice—Scenes from the Veterinary Life (2004)
- The Sugar Season: A Year in the Life of Maple Syrup, and One Family's Quest for the Sweetest Harvest (2014)

== Other publications ==
Whynott has written book reviews for The New York Times and Boston Globe, travel stories for Outside, Islands, and New England Monthly and articles about science and nature for Smithsonian and Discover. For the San Diego Reader he wrote about photographic archives, a study of the California Current, and the work of astronomers at Palomar Observatory. He wrote about a week aboard a cod trawler for New England Monthly, an essay about nonfiction writing structures for Writer's Chronicle, and his experience studying piano with Sammy Price for Massachusetts Review.

== Residence ==
Whynott is an eleventh generation Cape Codder, and now lives in Langdon, New Hampshire (population 688 in 2010).

== Music ==
Whynott studied piano and piano tuning, and for 15 years was a professional piano tuner in western Massachusetts. He played blues and jazz piano and formed The Whynott Boogie Trio after studying with Sammy Price, a jazz pianist also known as the king of boogie-woogie, in Harlem, New York.
