= McClements =

McClements is a surname. Notable people with the surname include:

- Barry McClements (born 2001), para swimmer from Northern Ireland
- Catherine McClements (born 1965), Australian actress
- Dave McClements (born 1989), Northern Irish footballer, who plays in midfield
- David J. McClements, British food scientist and professor
- Dorothy McClements (born 1944), American gymnast
- Les McClements, Australian rules footballer
- Lyn McClements (born 1951), Australian butterfly swimmer and Olympic gold medallist

== See also ==
- McClement
