= Jack Aylmer =

American politician and college president (1934–2018)

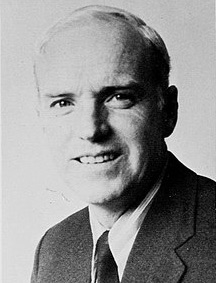

Member of the Massachusetts Senate from the Cape and Islands district
- In office 1971–1981
- Preceded by: Allan Francis Jones
- Succeeded by: Paul V. Doane

Personal details
- Born: January 27, 1934 Barnstable, Massachusetts, U.S.
- Died: July 8, 2018 (aged 84) Barnstable, Massachusetts, U.S.
- Party: Republican
- Spouse: Ann M. (McLean) Aylmer
- Education: Massachusetts Maritime Academy; Bridgewater State College; Suffolk Law School
- Occupation: Politician; College President

Jack Aylmer
- Allegiance: United States
- Branch: United States Navy
- Service years: 1957-1959
- Other work: President of Massachusetts Maritime Academy, 1981-1991

John Francis Aylmer (January 27, 1934 – July 8, 2018) was an American politician who served in the Massachusetts Senate and later served as President of Massachusetts Maritime Academy.

== Early life ==
A native of Barnstable, Massachusetts, Aylmer attended Barnstable High School where he played football and baseball, was quarterback for the school's undefeated 1951 football team, and earned seven varsity letters, graduating in 1952. The following year, he graduated from Admiral Billard Naval Academy in New London, Connecticut.

Aylmer played college baseball at Massachusetts Maritime Academy and earned his Bachelor of Science degree in 1957. Upon graduation, he entered the US Navy and served as a first lieutenant and gunnery officer on the USS Mattabesset in the Mediterranean Sea during the 1958 Lebanon crisis. In 1959, Aylmer was given an honorable discharge from the Navy and went on to work for seven years as a United States Merchant Marine officer.

== Political career ==
Beginning in 1966, Aylmer served two terms on the Barnstable board of selectmen, and in 1969 earned a master's degree in education from Bridgewater State College. In 1970, he was elected to his first of six consecutive terms in the Massachusetts Senate, where he was assistant minority leader and served on the ways and means committee. As a senator, Aylmer was "a driving force behind securing state funding for the Cape and Islands," advancing legislation such as the Old King's Highway Historic District act. He received his Juris Doctor degree from Suffolk Law School in 1977.

== President of Massachusetts Maritime Academy ==
In 1981, Aylmer vacated his senate seat during his sixth term and was appointed a rear admiral and President of his alma mater, Massachusetts Maritime Academy. He served in this capacity for ten years, retiring in 1991. Aylmer was inducted into the Mass Maritime Athletics Hall of Fame in 2002.

== Cape Cod Baseball League ==
Aylmer's long association with the Cape Cod Baseball League (CCBL) began as a player with the Barnstable Barons in 1952 and 1953. He served three years on the board of directors of the Cotuit Kettleers in the 1970s, and was instrumental in establishing expansion franchises in Hyannis (1976) and Bourne (1988). In 2011, the Hyannis club dedicated its field house at McKeon Park in Aylmer's honor, and in 2012 he was inducted into the CCBL Hall of Fame.
