= Judy Walden Scarafile =

- Cape Cod Baseball League President
- Born: January 31, 1949

Judith Walden Scarafile (born January 31, 1949) is the former president of the Cape Cod Baseball League (CCBL), serving from 1991 to 2015. She is featured in the Diamond Dreams exhibit of the National Baseball Hall of Fame and Museum in Cooperstown, New York.

A graduate of the University of Connecticut and Massachusetts College of Pharmacy and Health Sciences, Scarafile joined the Cape Cod League as an official scorer while a student at Connecticut, and became publicity assistant to league executive Dick Bresciani. She soon rose to other positions in the league, including publicist, secretary, deputy commissioner, and vice president, prior to being appointed president in 1991. Under her leadership the league experienced a period of sustained development, procured dozens of major corporate sponsors, and saw hundreds of its collegiate players go on to careers in Major League Baseball. As a member of the Yawkey Foundation board of trustees, Scarafile was instrumental in securing major field improvement grants for each of the CCBL home ballparks. Along the way, she received numerous awards and accolades, and was inducted into the CCBL Hall of Fame in 2003. Scarafile retired as CCBL president in 2015 after 46 years with the league.

The CCBL's first female president, Scarafile was honored in 2010 by the National Baseball Hall of Fame and Museum with inclusion in the museum's Diamond Dreams exhibit, which highlights stories of pioneering women in baseball. One of Scarafile's early challenges came while serving as the league's official scorer, covering the 1970 CCBL all-star game at Yankee Stadium. Shortly before game time, stadium security informed her that she could not remain in the press box area, which at the time was reserved for men only. In 2016, the baseball field at McKeon Park, home of the CCBL's Hyannis Harbor Hawks, was named in her honor.

== See also ==
- Judy Walden Scarafile Field at McKeon Park
- Cape Cod Baseball League
