= Ian Gilmartin =

British inventor

Ian Gilmartin is a British inventor from Kendal in the United Kingdom. In 2006 he invented a mini-waterwheel that generates electricity. The prototype produces 1-2 kW.

The off-the-shelf low-head micro hydro waterwheel system could generate a supply of electricity from a water fall as little as 8 in (20 cm).

Gilmartin is an electrician, but does not own a television and has never lived in a house with electricity.

== See also ==
- Run-of-the-river hydroelectricity
- Microgeneration
