= Massachusetts Air and Space Museum =

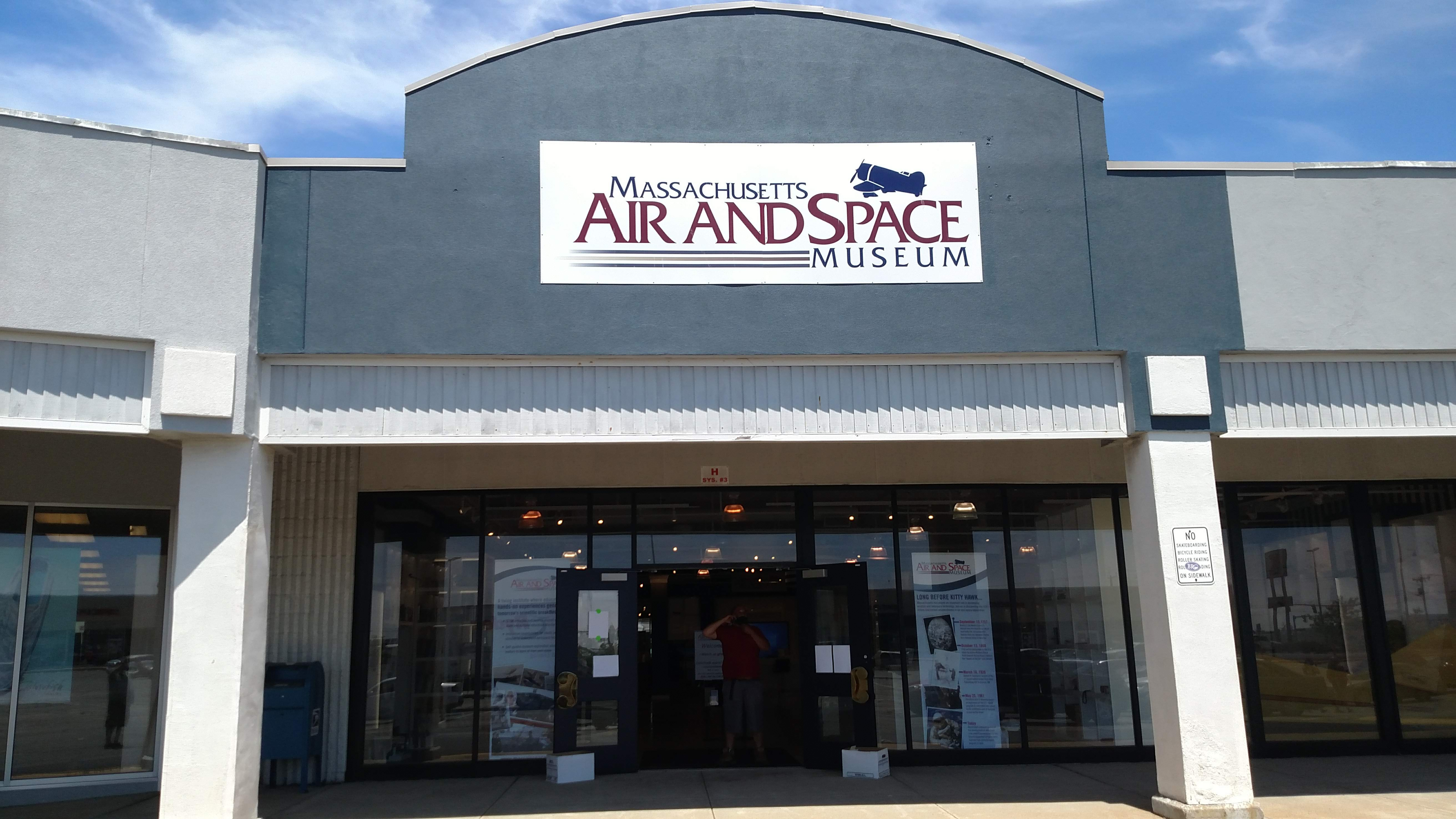
- MASM's first location in Hyannis, Massachusetts
- Location: 45 L.P. Henderson Road, Beverly, Massachusetts
- Type: Air and Space Museum
- Website: www.massairspace.org

The Massachusetts Air and Space Museum, is located in Beverly, Massachusetts. Its exhibits portray the role that Massachusetts people and organizations have played in the advancement of the aviation and space industry. Its collection includes aerospace systems, photographs, and artifacts.

In 2007, a group of people from the space and aviation industries founded a non-profit tax-exempt organization to establish an air and space museum.

It has been funded through grants and private and corporate donations. The museum's activities are overseen by a board of directors.

Formerly located in Hyannis, Massachusetts, MASM temporarily closed and is scheduled to reopen at Beverly Regional Airport in Beverly, Massachusetts in early 2027
