= Mike Gilmartin =

American football player (born 1986)

Profile
- Position: Offensive tackle

Personal information
- Born: May 24, 1986 (age 40); Hyannis, Massachusetts, U.S.
- Listed height: 6 ft 6 in (1.98 m)
- Listed weight: 305 lb (138 kg)

Career information
- College: Rutgers

Career history
- 2010–2011: Philadelphia Soul (AFL)

Mike Gilmartin (born May 24, 1986, in Hyannis, Massachusetts) is an American former football offensive lineman who was signed by the Arena Football League's Philadelphia Soul in 2010. He played college football at Rutgers University. Born in Massachusetts, Gilmartin was raised in Fort Myers, Florida, as well as nearby Estero, where he played on the Estero High School football team.

== Career ==
He was recruited by schools such as South Carolina, Clemson, Pittsburgh, Rutgers, University of Florida, University of Miami, Auburn, Georgia Tech, Central Florida, Purdue, Boston College, Princeton, and Syracuse. Though initially Gilmartin had made a verbal commitment with South Carolina to play under Lou Holtz and Dave DeGuglielmo, he ultimately he signed with Greg Schiano at Rutgers University.

At Rutgers he was a four-year letter-winner and a four-year All Big East Academic participant, and he played Right Tackle, Right Guard, Left Guard & Center, as well as Special Teams positions. He attended four Bowl games (Insight, Texas, International, and PapaJohns.com) during his football career at Rutgers, and won three of them. Gilmartin graduated from Rutgers in December 2008 with a 3.264 GPA and a BA in American Studies.

Gilmartin did not participate in Pro Day his senior year; he took a year off from football and came back to Pro Day at Rutgers University in March 2010. There was interest from scouts, but his time away from the field was questioned. He later participated in UFL tryouts and went to Alabama for workouts with the Vipers, an AFL team.

He signed with Philadelphia Soul, an Arena Team in November 2010.
