= Brendan Hamill =

Brendan Hamill may refer to:

- Brendan Hamill (writer) (born 1945), Northern Ireland poet and writer
- Brendan Hamill (soccer) (born 1992), Australian football (soccer) player
