= Mark Gilmartin =

Mark Gilmartin (born February 12, 1963) resides in Reno, Nevada, is a co-owner of Hole In One International and Odds On Promotions, has extensive experience within the golf industry, and has competed at the national amateur golf level throughout his career.

== Education ==
Gilmartin graduated from the University of Nevada (1986) with a Bachelor of Science in Business.

== Career ==
Gilmartin began his career in the golf industry in 1982 as president of Tournament Golf Specialists, a wholesale golf tournament supply company.

In 1986, Tournament Golf Specialists became M&M Management and broadened its scope to include golf course retail management and consulting. M&M Management continued operating in this capacity until 1999.

In 1991, Gilmartin added to his business holdings by co-founding Hole In One International, a full-service golf promotions and prize indemnification insurance company. Soon thereafter, Hole In One International added a sister company, Odds On Promotions, to handle the non-golf promotion and prize indemnification requests it was receiving. Today, Gilmartin acts as president of both Hole In One International and Odds On Promotions.

In 2011, Gilmartin's company, Odds On Promotions, faced public scrutiny regarding the hockey shot of 11-year-old Nate Smith of Owatonna, Minnesota. because Nick Smith, Nate's brother, was drawn to take the shot, thus causing a contractual breach. Odds On Promotions was unable to pay the $50,000 claim. In light of the eventual honesty of the Smith family, Gilmartin opted to donate $20,000 to Minnesota Youth Hockey in the boys' names to foster a positive environment for present and future youth hockey in Minnesota.

In 2013, Gilmartin was interviewed by Randy Maniloff with Coverage Opinions.

In September 2013, Gilmartin was interviewed by Stuart Varney with Fox Business.

In January 2014, Gilmartin was interviewed by Caitlin Bronson with Insurance Business America.

In June 2015, Gilmartin was interviewed for an article on weather-based conditional rebate promotions by Brian Brus with The Journal Record.

In October 2015, Gilmartin was interviewed by John Kelly for an article about hole in one insurance that appeared in the Washington Post.

In February 2025, Gilmartin refused to pay UMass college student Noah Lee following a promotion he ran at a UMass basketball game with a prize of $10,000. Lee made a layup, free throw, three pointer, and half court shot all on his first attempt and was told he won the competition and would be awarded the prize money. Days later, Gilmartin and his company, Odds On Promotions, informed the student that he would not receive the money due to his foot being on the line upon review of a grainy replay from the crowd. This caused major backlash with many running to X to call out Gilmartin's greed and dishonesty, also pointing out that Lee had more time on the clock that he would have used to shoot again from behind the line. Many are going on to the Odds On Promotions X page to call the company along with Gilmartin "frauds", "losers", and "scammers".
