= Ó Brolaigh =

Ó Brolaigh is a Gaelic-Irish surname.

== Background ==
The sept of O Brolaigh were a tributary clan of the Clan hAonghusa federation, originally from the Bredach in Inishowen, descended of Angus mac Eoghan mac Niall of the Nine Hostages. One branch of this sept were apparently erenaghs of Tech na Coimairce near Castlefinn, Donegal and Clonleigh, Donegal and Ulster. There were O Brolaighs in Leinster at the time of St. Brigit, who mentions the kindness shown her by a "gentleman of the O Brolaigh."

According to the Annals of the Four Masters, in 1188 "Martain Ua Brolaigh aird-eccnaidh Gaoidheal & fer leighinn Arda Macha do écc/chief sage of all the Gaels, and chief lector of Ard-Macha, died."

== People ==
- Joe Brolly (born 1969), Gaelic player analyst and former player
- Shane Brolly (born 1970), Northern Ireland actor
