= Alan Hampson =

English footballer (1927–1989)

Personal information
- Date of birth: 31 December 1927
- Place of birth: Prescot, England
- Date of death: August 1989 (aged 61)
- Place of death: Knowsley, Merseyside, England
- Position: Inside forward

Senior career*
Years	Team	Apps	(Gls)
1950–1952	Everton	1	(0)
1952–1956	Halifax Town	121	(32)
1956–1957	Bradford City	6	(4)
- Prescot Cables
Total		128	(36)
- * Club domestic league appearances and goals

Alan Hampson (31 December 1927 – August 1989) was an English professional footballer who played as an inside forward.

== Career ==
Born in Prescot, Hampson played for Everton, Halifax Town, Bradford City and Prescot Cables.
