= William Hampson =

- Born: 14 March 1854; Bebington, Cheshire, England
- Died: 1 January 1926 (aged 71); Holland Park, London, England
- Education: Trinity College, Oxford
- Known for: First patent for liquifying air
- Spouse: Amy Bolton

William Hampson (1854–1926) was the first person to patent a process for liquifying air.

== Early life ==
William Hampson was born on 14 March 1854, the second son of William Hampson of Puddington, Cheshire, England. He was educated at Liverpool College, Manchester Grammar School and Trinity College, Oxford, where he matriculated in October 1874. He studied classics, graduating with a second class degree. He then joined the Inner Temple in London to qualify as a barrister.

There is no record of Hampson's enrolment in a course of physics or engineering; he therefore seems to have educated himself in science and engineering.

== Liquefaction of air ==
In 1895, Hampson filed a preliminary patent for an apparatus to liquify air. His apparatus was simple: A compressor raised the pressure of a quantity of air to 87–150 atmospheres. The high-pressure air was then passed through cylinders that contained material which removed water and carbon dioxide from the air. The dried air then passed through a copper coil and exited through a nozzle at the end of the coil, which reduced the air's pressure to one atmosphere. After expanding through the nozzle, the air's temperature would drop greatly (due to the Joule-Thomson effect). The cold air then flowed back over the coil, chilling the air that was flowing through the coil. As a result, within 20–25 minutes, the apparatus would begin to produce liquified air. The apparatus typically measured approximately one cubic metre.

Hampson made a preliminary filing for a patent on his liquefaction process on 23 May 1895; Carl von Linde, a German engineer, filed for a similar patent on 5 June 1895.

Hampson's method of liquifying gases was adopted by Brin's Oxygen Company of Westminster, London, England (renamed the "British Oxygen Company" in 1906). In 1905, the company acquired Hampson's three patents on the liquefaction and separation of atmospheric gases.

From Brin's Oxygen Company, which retained Hampson as a consultant, Hampson provided William Ramsay with the liquid air that allowed Ramsay to discover neon, krypton, and xenon, for which Ramsay received the Nobel Prize in Chemistry of 1904.

== Other pursuits ==
In 1900–1901, Hampson conducted adult education courses; specifically, a series of lectures at the University College in London. From these lectures came two books: Radium Explained (1905) provided a lay audience with an account of recent developments in research on radioactivity, while Paradoxes of Nature and of Science (1906) presented scientific curiosities that were contrary to common experience; e.g., how ice could be used as a source of heat.

Hampson also became interested in medical science. He became a licensed apothecary in 1896, and by 1910 he was practising in several London hospitals. In 1912, he published his research on a crude pacemaker. The system electrically stimulated large muscles of the body to contract regularly; pulses of blood were thus forced towards the heart and these pulses would then cause the heart to synchronise with the external electrical stimulator. Hampson also made a minor improvement to X-ray tubes.

Hampson ventured into economics, too. He published a book on the subject: Modern Thraldom: A New Social Gospel (1907). Hampson regarded credit—broadly interpreted as debt or borrowing in any form—as responsible for many of an economy's ills. He prescribed a world in which there would be no credit, interest, mortgages, or rents. All sales would be in cash; debts would not be legally recognised; factories would be run as a cooperative of their workers. The national government would be funded by a sales tax, and the national economy would be sheltered from foreign competition.

He married Amy Bolton.
