= McClement =

McClement is a surname. Notable people with the surname include:

- Jay McClement (born 1983), Canadian ice hockey player
- Timothy McClement (born 1951), British Royal Navy admiral

== See also ==
- McClements
