= Tom Gilmartin =

Tom Gilmartin may refer to:

- Tom Gilmartin (businessman) (1935–2013), Irish businessman, whistleblower and pivotal Mahon Tribunal witness
- Tom Gilmartin (politician) (1924–2012), American politician

== See also ==
- Thomas Gilmartin (1861–1939), Irish Roman Catholic archbishop
