= Hammill =

Hammill is a surname. Notable persons with that surname include:

- Adam Hammill, English footballer
- Caleb Wild Hammill, one of the founders of the stockbrokerage and banking investment firm of Shearson, Hammill & Co.
- Ching Hammill, American football player
- Ellen Hammill, writer of and actor in Joey (1986 film)
- Eric Hammill, farmer and former politician on Prince Edward Island
- Frank Hammill, American politician
- Gerry Hammill, former member of Chocolate USA
- Henry Hammill Fowler, American lawyer and politician
- John Hammill, governor of Iowa
- John Hammill, first drummer of Pussy Galore
- Peter Hammill, English singer-songwriter and a founding member of Van der Graaf Generator

== See also ==
- Hammill Brickworks, in the Kent Coalfield, England
- Shearson, Hammill & Co., a Wall Street brokerage and investment banking firm
- Hamill, a surname
- Ó hÁdhmaill, a surname
- Hammil Valley, California
