= Pat Hamill =

Scottish footballer (born 1950)

Personal information
- Full name: Patrick Douglas Hamill
- Date of birth: 27 November 1950 (age 75)
- Place of birth: Greenock, Scotland
- Position: Forward

Youth career
- Greenock Juniors

Senior career*
Years	Team	Apps	(Gls)
1968–1970	Queen's Park	23	(2)
1970	Hamilton Academical	21	(3)

International career
1969–1970	Scotland Amateurs	6	(0)
- * Club domestic league appearances and goals

Patrick Douglas Hamill (born 27 November 1950) is a Scottish former amateur footballer who played in the Scottish League for Queen's Park and Hamilton Academical as a forward. He was capped by Scotland at amateur level.

== Career statistics ==
Appearances and goals by club, season and competition
Club	Season	League			Scottish Cup		League Cup		Total	
Club	Season	Division	Apps	Goals	Apps	Goals	Apps	Goals	Apps	Goals
Queen's Park	1968–69	Scottish Second Division	11	1	1	0	0	0	12	1
Queen's Park	1969–70	Scottish Second Division	12	1	1	0	4	0	17	1
Queen's Park	Total		23	2	2	0	4	0	29	2
Hamilton Academical	1970–71	Scottish Second Division	22	1	1	0	2	1	25	2
Career total			45	3	3	0	6	1	54	4
