= Hampson baronets =

Extinct baronetcy in the Baronetage of England

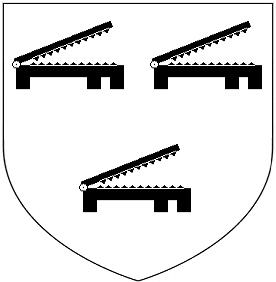
- Escutcheon of the Hampson baronets of Taplow
- Creation date: 1642
- Status: extinct
- Extinction date: 1969
- Motto: Nunc aut nunquam, Now or never
- Arms: Argent, three hemp-brakes sable. These canting arms occurred frequently repeated in the cornice of the screen of the now demolished Hampson Chapel, built in the 1630s, in the north aisle of St Nicholas's' Church, Taplow.

The Hampson Baronetcy, of Taplow in the County of Buckingham, was a title in the Baronetage of England. It was created by King Charles I on 3 June 1642 for Thomas Hampson, second son of Sir Robert Hampson (1537–1607) one of the two Sheriffs of the City of London in 1599, knighted by King James I in 1603. The third Baronet sat as Member of Parliament for Chipping Wycombe in 1685. The tenth Baronet was an entomologist. The title became extinct on the death of the twelfth Baronet in 1969.

== Hampson baronets, of Taplow (1642) ==
- Sir Thomas Hampson, 1st Baronet (c. 1589–1655)
- Sir Thomas Hampson, 2nd Baronet (c. 1626–1670)
- Sir Dennis Hampson, 3rd Baronet (died 1719)
- Sir George Hampson, 4th Baronet (died 1724)
- Sir George Hampson, 5th Baronet (died 1754)
- Sir George Francis Hampson, 6th Baronet (1738–1774)
- Sir Thomas Philip Hampson, 7th Baronet (1765–1820), did not use the title because of his political views
- Sir George Francis Hampson, 8th Baronet (1788–1833)
- Sir George Francis Hampson, 9th Baronet (1823–1896)
- Sir George Francis Hampson, 10th Baronet (1860–1936)
- Sir Dennys Francis Hampson, 11th Baronet (1897–1939)
- Sir Cyril Aubrey Charles Hampson, 12th Baronet (1909–1969)
