= Michelle Hampson =

American neuroscientist

- Education: Boston University; University of Alberta
- Scientific career
- Workplaces: Yale University
- Thesis: An investigation of speech reference frames : modelling and psychophysics (2000)

Michelle Hampson is an American neuroscientist who is a Professor of Radiology and Biomedical Imaging at Yale University. She serves as director of real-time functional magnetic resonance imaging.

== Early life and education ==
Hampson studied computer science at the University of Alberta. She moved to Boston University for her doctoral research, working on the computational modelling of neural networks. Hampson joined Yale University as a postdoctoral researcher. Her postdoctoral research involved some of the first studies of the functional connectivity in the resting state. She mapped the functional connectivity of the resting state to different behavioural variables. After her postdoc she started working with real time functional magnetic resonance imaging (fMRI). In particular, Hampson was interested in whether fMRI neurofeedback could be used to help people control their brain activity.

== Research and career ==
Hampson was appointed to the faculty of Yale University in 2002, where she develops real-time (rt) fMRI for the treatment of mental and neurological conditions. The Hampson lab has worked on the development of fMRI neurofeedback to help people with obsessive–compulsive disorder, Tourette syndrome and post-traumatic stress disorder. For example, in patients with contamination anxiety, making use of neurofeedback to visualize and control activity in the orbitofrontal cortex was shown to be helpful for controlling that anxiety. For patients with post-traumatic stress disorder, Hampson explored whether it is possible to control activity in the amygdala when recalling trauma. Her group found that clinical impacts of neurofeedback can take weeks to unfold after training.

In 2021, Hampson edited the Elsevier textbook fMRI Neurofeedback.

Most recently, she has become interested in ethical issues associated with neurofeedback.

== Selected publications ==
- Bharat B. Biswal; Maarten Mennes; Xi-Nian Zuo; et al. (2010). "Toward discovery science of human brain function". Proceedings of the National Academy of Sciences of the United States of America. 107 (10): 4734–9. Bibcode:2010PNAS..107.4734B. doi:10.1073/pnas.0911855107. PMC 2842060. PMID 20176931. Wikidata Q24619932.
- Michelle Hampson; Naomi R Driesen; Pawel Skudlarski; John C Gore; R Todd Constable (2006). "Brain connectivity related to working memory performance". The Journal of Neuroscience. 26 (51): 13338–13343. doi:10.1523/jneurosci.3408-06.2006. PMC 2677699. PMID 17182784. Wikidata Q37181000.
- Michelle Hampson; Bradley S Peterson; Pawel Skudlarski; James C Gatenby; John C Gore (2002). "Detection of functional connectivity using temporal correlations in MR images". Human Brain Mapping. 15 (4): 247–262. doi:10.1002/hbm.10022. PMID 11835612. Wikidata Q60342111.
