= Sarah Hampson =

Canadian author, columnist, and journalist

Sarah A. Hampson
- Born: May 6, 1958 (age 68); Montreal, Quebec, Canada
- Education: Smith College (Bachelor of Arts, 1979)
- Occupations: Columnist and author
- Years active: 1991–present
- Employer: The Globe and Mail
- Known for: Newspaper publications
- Children: 3

Sarah A. Hampson (born May 6, 1958) is a Canadian author, columnist, and journalist. Since 1999, she has been writing for The Globe and Mail, a national Canadian newspaper, with her Interview column being nominated for a National Newspaper Award in 2000. Hampson joined The Globe and Mail as a permanent columnist and has been publishing multiple columns since then, including Generation Ex.

== Early life and education ==
Sarah Hampson was born in 1958 in Montreal, Quebec, Canada. She has four siblings, whose father worked for a multinational company. Her family frequently relocating during her childhood, living in Switzerland as well as in Toronto, Ontario and Vancouver, British Columbia, Canada. In Hampson's memoir Happily Ever After Marriage: There's Nothing Like Divorce to Clear the Mind, she writes that she was close to her paternal and maternal grandmothers during her childhood and adult life.

Growing up, Hampson had an interest in reading and writing. One of Hampson's high school friends, stated to her, "[Y]ou've been talking about wanting to be a writer since you were like 15." Hampson attended Smith College in Northampton, Massachusetts, United States, graduating in 1979 with a Bachelor of Arts in English literature. “It’s not that I defined myself as a feminist but as a young woman." Hampson said about her time at Smith College.

== Career ==
Following her graduation in 1979 from Smith College, Hampson worked in advertising as a copywriter and creative director in London, Halifax, and Toronto, as well as working for Ted Bates advertising firm.

In 1990, after the birth of her third son, she left advertising. In 1991, Hampson submitted a writing piece to The Global and Mail "Facts & Arguments" section, earning her first byline. The same here, she wrote a few interior design stories for Canadian House and Home magazine and Toronto Life.

In 1993, Hampson officially started her journalism career. She wrote for Toronto Life, Saturday Night, Chatelaine, Report on Business and Canadian Art, among other publications. She has done interviews with high-profile individuals, some being Isiah Thomas, NBA basketball player and Emanuel Sandhu, So You Think You Can Dance contestant. “People are such interesting beings," Hampson says to the Ryerson Review of Journalism "there are so many things going on with them—what happened today, what happened yesterday, what they’re here to speak to you about, what their background is, what they’re going to do tomorrow."

Hampson has been praised for her work in The Global and Mail, “What sets the interview column apart is Sarah’s willingness to go off-message and take her subject off-message,” says Kevin Siu, editor of the Globe and Mail's Life section, where Hampson’s columns appear. In 2007, Hampson started "Generation Ex", a personal column about social contagion of divorce. She is described as The Globe and Mail's "divorce expert". Following the popular column, in 2010, Hampson published Happily Ever After Marriage, a memoir about her life and divorce.

In 2016, Hampson published Dr. Coo Solves The Problem with Pigeons, a children's picture book.

== Personal life ==
Sarah has three sons, Nick, Tait, and Luke. After being married for 20 years, she divorced her husband and writes about divorce in her professional life.

== Publications ==
- Happily Ever After Marriage: There's Nothing Like Divorce to Clear the Mind, Knopf Canada 2010, ISBN 9780307397683
- Dr. Coo and the Pigeon Protest 2018
