= Mawhinney =

Mawhinney is a Scottish and Northern Irish surname. Notable people with the surname include:

- Brian Mawhinney (1940–2019), Northern Irish politician
- Chuck Mawhinney (1949–2024), American sniper and marine
- Gordon Mawhinney (born 1943), Northern Irish politician
- Maxine Mawhinney (born 1957), Northern Irish newsreader
