= Roger Hampson (footballer) =

Australian rules footballer

Personal information
- Full name: Roger A. Hampson
- Born: 15 November 1948 (age 77)
- Original team: La Trobe University
- Height: 187 cm (6 ft 2 in)
- Weight: 70 kg (154 lb)
- Position: Wingman

Playing career^{1}
Years	Club	Games (Goals)
1969–71	Essendon	10 (1)
- ^{1} Playing statistics correct to the end of 1971.

Roger Hampson (born 15 November 1948) is a former Australian rules footballer who played with Essendon in the Victorian Football League (VFL). Hampson played eight games in his first season with Essendon and won the club's best first-year player award, but a severe knee injury forced him to miss the latter half of the year and all of 1970. He returned in 1971, but could only manage two more senior games before leaving mid-season to Victorian Football Association side Northcote. Hampson next played with fellow VFA team Sandringham for a year before moving to suburban football. He was captain-coach of East Caulfield, Balwyn and Edithvale-Aspendale before a stint as assistant coach to VFL club Melbourne's under-19s. Hampson came back to Essendon 1989 to be the club's general manager for seven years.
