= Stephen Hampson =

English cricketer

Stephen Hampson (born 14 June 1968) is a former English cricketer. He was a left-handed batsman and a left-arm slow bowler who played for Cheshire. He was born in Ashton-under-Lyne, Lancashire.

Hampson, who played for Cheshire in the Minor Counties Championship for the first time in 1997, made a single List A appearance for the team, in the 1998 NatWest Trophy tournament. From the tailend, he scored a duck with the bat, and took figures of 0–32 with the ball.
