= Ged McNamee =

English footballer

Personal information
- Full name: Gerard McNamee
- Date of birth: 16 August 1960 (age 66)
- Place of birth: Consett, England
- Position: Midfielder

Senior career*
Years	Team	Apps	(Gls)
1980–1983	Hartlepool United	4	(1)
- Consett
- * Club domestic league appearances and goals

Gerard McNamee (born 16 August 1960) is an English former footballer who works at Sunderland as the academy's Head of Recruitment.

== Playing career ==
McNamee came through the youth system at Hartlepool United before signing his first professional contract in 1980. His time as a player with Pools was blighted by injury and he made just four appearances in three seasons, scoring once against York City.

After leaving Hartlepool, McNamee went onto play for Consett as well as various other North-East non-league sides.

== Coaching career ==
McNamee began working for Manchester United's regional development centre in Durham in 1992. In 1995, McNamee began running the Durham branch of Manchester United's Centre of Excellence before moving to Sunderland A.F.C. in 1997 where he became the club's Centre of Excellence Director.

In 2004, Sunderland manager Mick McCarthy moved McNamee into the position of the club's Academy Manager. He would remain in that position with the Black Cats until 2016 when he stepped down following a restructure of the club's academy. During McNamee's time as Academy Manager, Sunderland produced players such as Jordan Henderson, Jordan Pickford, Jack Colback and Duncan Watmore.

McNamee returned to football in February 2018 working as a voluntary coach at National League club Hartlepool United as part of caretaker manager Matthew Bates' backroom staff. Following Bates' appointment as first-team manager in May 2018, McNamee's position of first team coach became a full-time paid role. In October 2019, McNamee departed the club alongside manager Craig Hignett.

In January 2020, McNamee returned to Sunderland as the academy's Head of Recruitment.

== Personal life ==
McNamee's son, Tom, previously played for Sunderland but failed to make a first-team appearance before moving onto Blyth Spartans in 2015.
