= John Hampson (writer) =

English writer

John Hampson (1760–1819), was an English miscellaneous writer.

Hampson, son of John Hampson of Manchester, was born in 1760. His parents were Methodists, and both father and son acted as preachers under John Wesley. About 1784 Hampson left the body, matriculated at St. Edmund Hall, Oxford, 13 July 1785, and proceeded B.A. 1791, M.A. 1792. Taking holy orders in the English church, he obtained a charge in Sunderland, and about 1801 was made rector of that town. He died late 1819.

Hampson's chief work is 'Memoirs of the late Rev. John Wesley, A.M., with a Review of his Life and Writings, and a History of Methodism from its Commencement in 1729 to the Present Time,' 3 vols., Sunderland, 1791. A German translation in two parts, by Professor August Hermann Niemeyer, appeared at Halle in 1793. He also wrote 'A Blow at the Root of Pretended Calvinism or Real Antinomianism,' 1788; 'Observations on the Present War, the Projected Invasion, and a Decree of the National Convention for the Emancipation of the Slaves in the French Colonies,' Sunderland, 1793?; 'The Poetics of Marcus Hieronymus Vida, Bishop of Alba; with Translations from the Latin of Dr. Louth, Mr. Gray, and others,' Sunderland, 1793, and several sermons.

He died 7 December 1819 in Sunderland.
