= John Hampson (artist) =

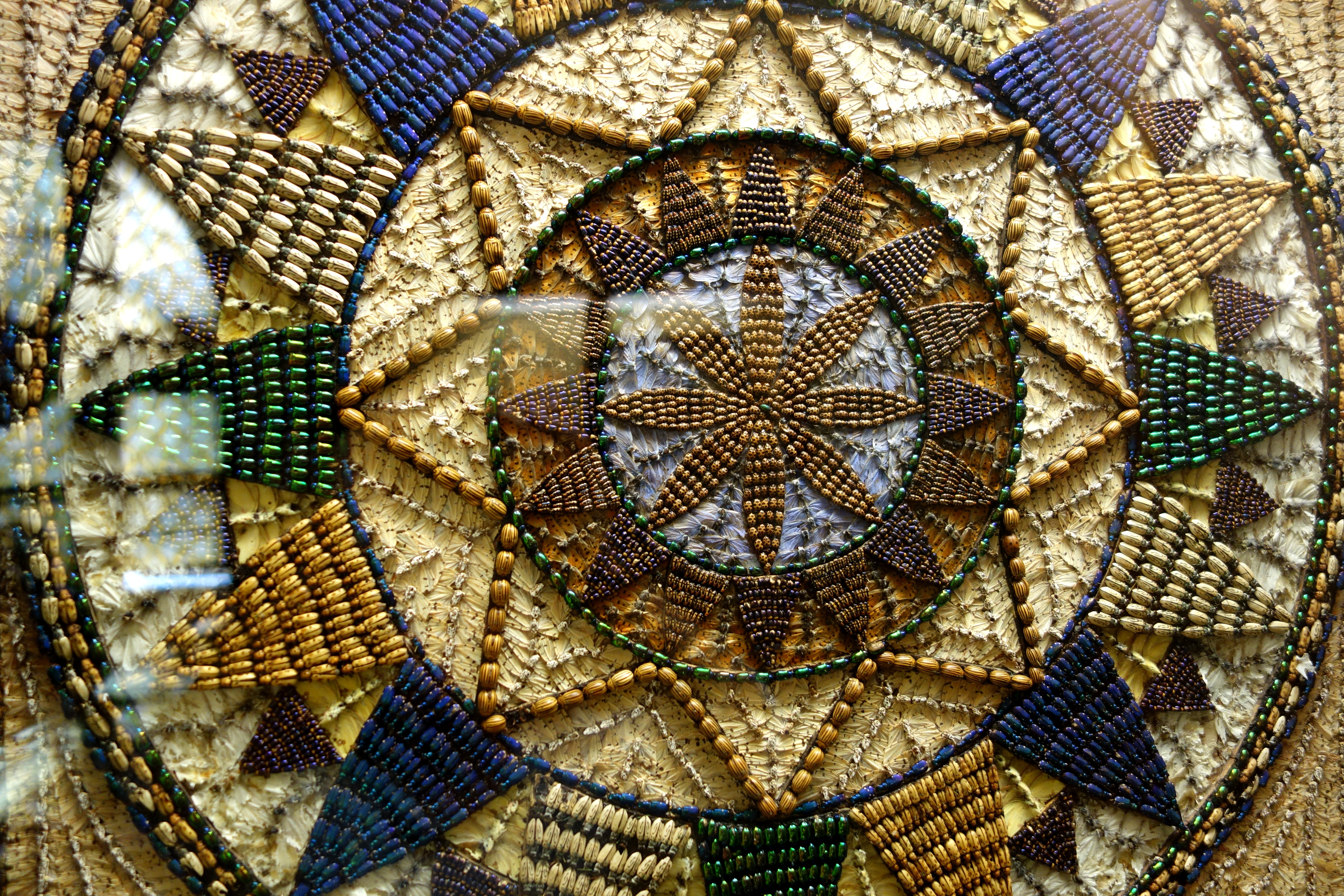
Centennial Wheel by John Hampson, completed in 1892. Fairbanks Museum

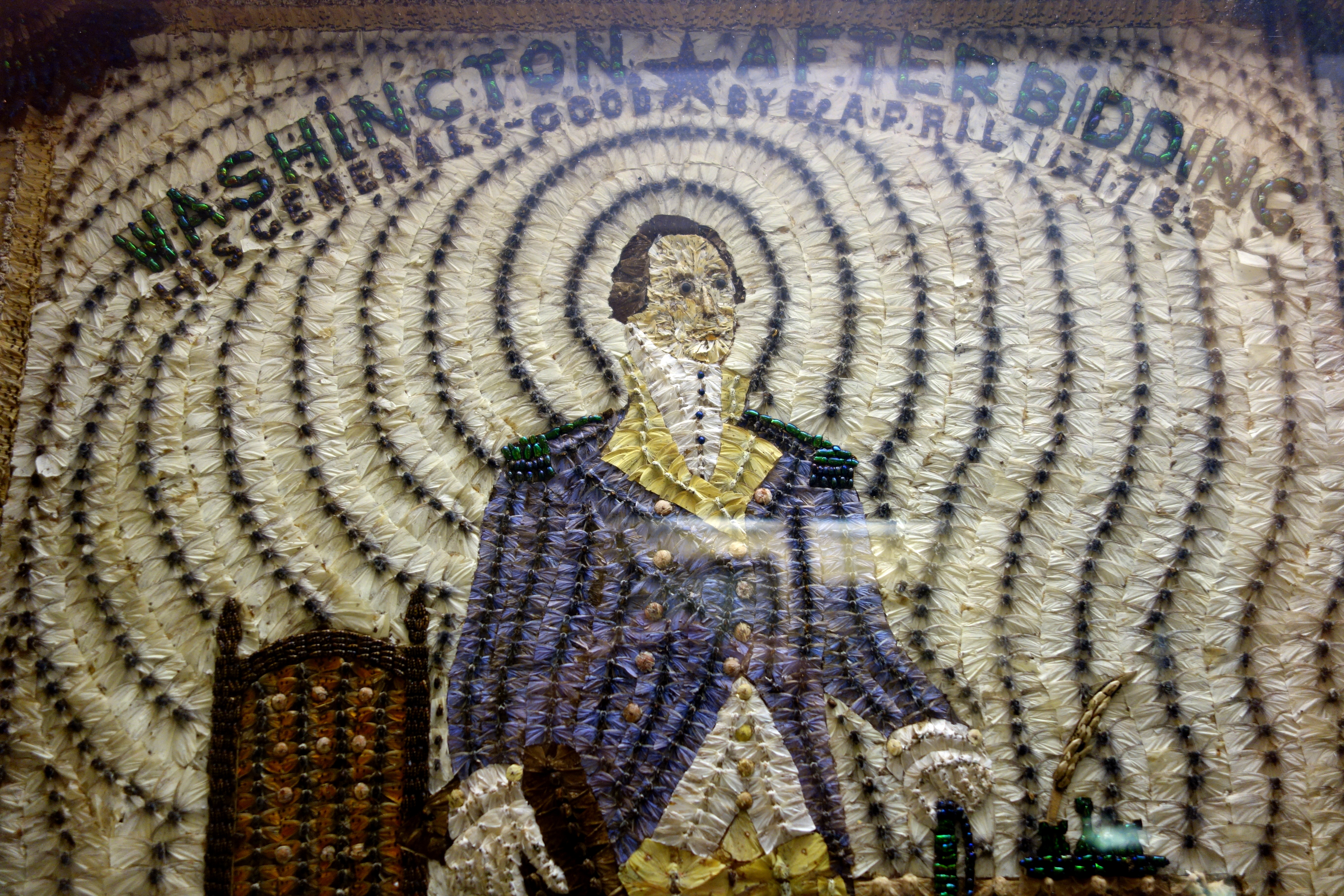
Washington after Bidding his Generals Good-Bye, April 11, 1783, by John Hampson, completed in 1909. Fairbanks Museum

John Hampson (1836–1923) was an artist whose works hang at the Fairbanks Museum in Vermont. Hampson is known for his unusual mosaics formed of tens of thousands of insects, whether moths, butterflies, or beetles.

== Life ==
Hampson was born in Offerton, a suburb of Stockport, Cheshire, England, on July 9, 1836. He trained as a machinist and came to the United States in 1858. Hampson had a keen interest in steam engines, and in 1865 he operated a self-designed, three-wheeled, steam-powered road vehicle, one of the first "horseless waggons" in America. During the Civil War he worked in the government navy yards, after which he subsequently moved to thirteen different states. In 1877, he settled with his wife Emma in Newark, New Jersey. His son, John J. Hampson, worked as a machinist for Thomas Edison from 1907 to 1915, and it is said that Hampson himself was contracted by Edison to construct experimental equipment in his laboratory when Edison moved to Menlo Park in 1876. Although his actual employment is disputed, when Edison installed electric lighting in his headquarters, he wrote that it was powered by "the little Hampson steam engine that we had in the Menlo Park machine shop".

Hampson's passion for insects inspired him to create at least nine mosaics made of moths, butterflies, and beetles arranged in designs. Each piece, taking a few years to construct, includes between 6,300 and 13,500 insects and each has a decorated frame that he constructed as well. His designs included portraits of Abraham Lincoln and George Washington, and one in which he celebrated his own 50th birthday. He died at 71 Cutler Street, Newark, the address he had lived since 1877, on January 21, 1923, aged 86.

== Exhibition ==
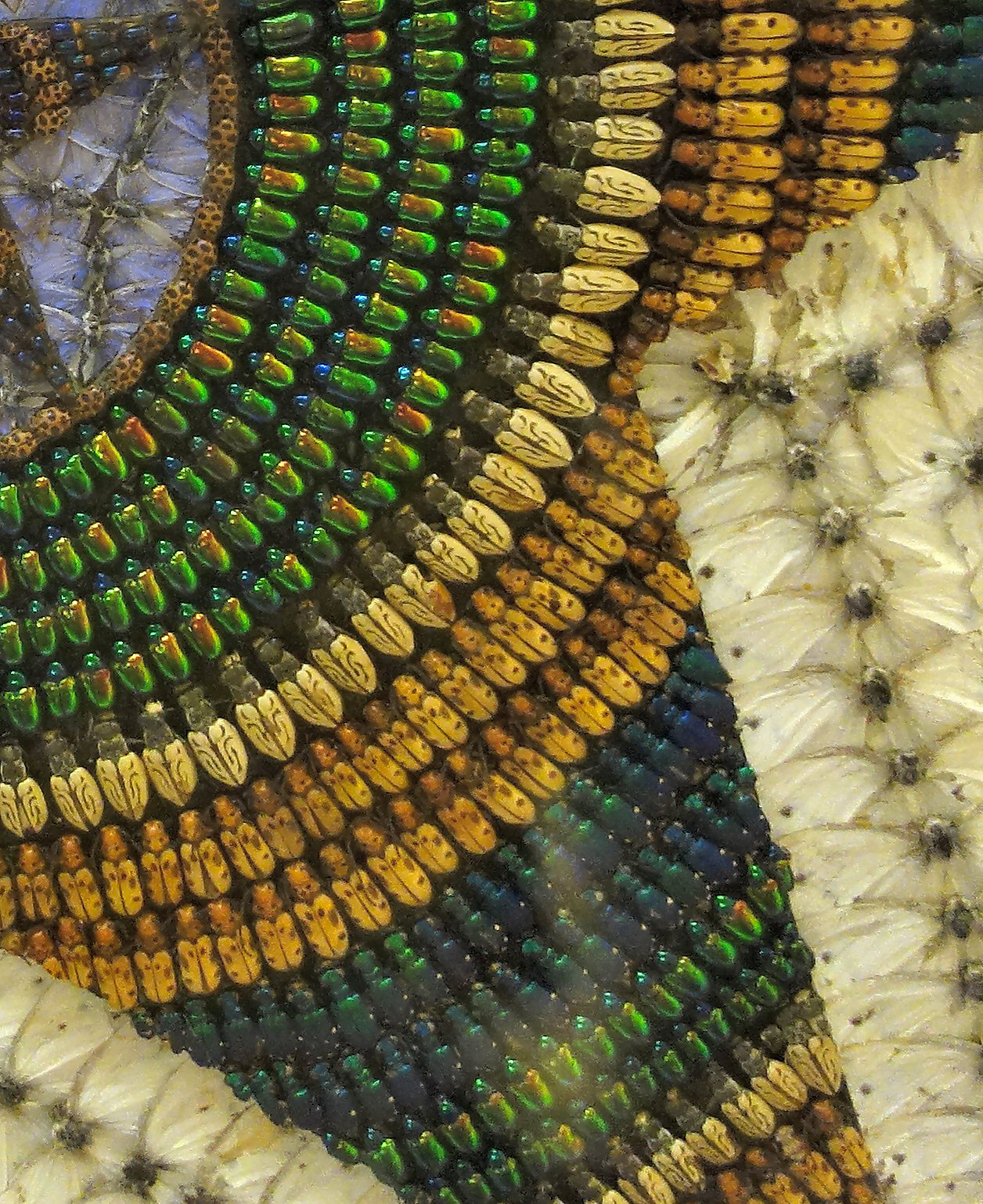
Detail of North Star, completed 1887, showing its construction using beetles and moths

When Hampson died, his daughter searched for a museum that would exhibit his art, finding the Fairbanks Museum, in St. Johnsbury, Vermont, was the Seven of the works are on display at the museum; three collages, General Slocum (of Henry Warner Slocum), a portrait of George Washington, and a kaleidoscopic design are considered too damaged to exhibit.

== Descriptions of Hampson's work ==
The Newark News stated "It would take perhaps three or four years for Hampson to complete one picture, mounting the insects so that the white, black, red, orange, blue and yellow wings would form pictures of famous American generals in characteristic poses, or intricate designs such as the North Star, completed in 1887, or the Centennial Wheel, finished in 1892, copies from patchwork quilts, which had won prizes at exhibitions."

The website Roadside America described his work as "delicate interweaving of wings and metallic sheen of beetle carapace", and considered that Hampson had had "the misfortune of being born a hundred years too soon", speculating that had he lived now he might have been celebrated for building a "chapel on a 'Bug Mountain'".

Atlas Obscura considered the mosaics "the stars of Fairbanks' collections", finding them "absolutely jaw-dropping in person."
