= Peter McNamee (footballer) =

Scottish footballer (1935–2021)

Personal information
- Full name: Peter McNamee
- Date of birth: 20 March 1935
- Place of birth: Glasgow, Scotland
- Date of death: 27 August 2021 (aged 86)
- Place of death: Peterborough, England
- Position: Outside left

Senior career*
Years	Team	Apps	(Gls)
–1955	Lanark Athletic		
1955–1965	Peterborough United	303	(113)
1965–1966	King's Lynn		
1966	Notts County	3	(0)
- Corby Town
- March Town United

Managerial career
- –1972: March Town United
- * Club domestic league appearances and goals

Peter McNamee (20 March 1935 – 27 August 2021) was a Scottish professional footballer who played in the Football League for Peterborough United and Notts County as an outside left. He made nearly 350 appearances for Peterborough United and is a member of the club's Hall of Fame.

== Career statistics ==
Appearances and goals by club, season and competition
Club	Season	League			FA Cup		League Cup		Other		Total	
Club	Season	Division	Apps	Goals	Apps	Goals	Apps	Goals	Apps	Goals	Apps	Goals
Peterborough United	1954–55	Midland League	1	0	―		―		―		1	0
Peterborough United	1956–57	Midland League	14	6	0	0	―		2 (Note: Appearances in Maunsell Cup)	0	16	6
Peterborough United	1957–58	Midland League	33	15	0	0	―		2	1	35	16
Peterborough United	1958–59	Midland League	32	17	5	0	―		1 (Note: Appearance in East Anglian Cup)	0	38	17
Peterborough United	1959–60	Midland League	29	19	5	2	―		1 (Note: Appearance in Huntingdonshire Senior Cup)	0	35	21
Peterborough United	1960–61	Fourth Division	45	12	5	3	1	0	2 (Note: Appearances in Northamptonshire Senior Cup)	1	53	16
Peterborough United	1961–62	Third Division	25	9	1	1	0	0	1	1	27	11
Peterborough United	1962–63	Third Division	45	13	3	1	1	0	2 (Note: 1 appearance in Huntingdonshire Senior Cup, 1 appearance in Midland Floodlit Cup)	0	51	14
Peterborough United	1963–64	Third Division	42	11	0	0	1	1	0	0	43	12
Peterborough United	1964–65	Third Division	31	9	8	2	0	0	0	0	39	11
Peterborough United	1965–66	Third Division	6	2	0	0	―		―		6	2
Peterborough United	Total		303	113	27	9	3	1	11	3	344	126
Notts County	1965–66	Fourth Division	3	0	―		―		―		3	0
Career total			306	113	27	9	3	1	11	3	347	126

== Honours ==
Peterborough United

- Midland League: 1956–57, 1957–58, 1958–59, 1959–60
- Football League Third Division: 1960–61
- Maunsell Cup: 1956–57, 1957–58
- Northamptonshire Senior Cup: 1960–61, 1961–62

Individual

- Peterborough United Hall of Fame
