= Alex Hamill (footballer, born 1912) =

Scottish footballer

Personal information
- Full name: Alexander Hamill
- Date of birth: 1912
- Place of birth: Dumbarton, Scotland
- Height: 5 ft 8 in (1.73 m)
- Positions: Centre forward; right half

Senior career*
Years	Team	Apps	(Gls)
- Hamilton Welfare
–1930	Renton Thistle		
1930–1935	Cowdenbeath	151	(38)
1935–1936	Blackburn Rovers	21	(4)
1936–1937	Barnsley	24	(4)
1938	Carlisle United	25	(1)
- * Club domestic league appearances and goals

Alexander Hamill was a Scottish professional footballer who made over 150 appearances as a centre forward in the Scottish League for Cowdenbeath. He also played in the Football League for Carlisle United, Barnsley and Blackburn Rovers. After retiring as a player, he was a member of the committee at Dunnikier Colliery Juniors and served Raith Rovers as chief scout for 25 years.

== Career statistics ==
Appearances and goals by club, season and competition
Club	Season	League			National Cup		Total	
Club	Season	Division	Apps	Goals	Apps	Goals	Apps	Goals
Cowdenbeath	1930–31	Scottish First Division	34	3	5	1	39	4
Cowdenbeath	1931–32	Scottish First Division	25	2	2	0	27	2
Cowdenbeath	1932–33	Scottish First Division	33	10	2	0	35	10
Cowdenbeath	1933–34	Scottish First Division	28	8	3	1	31	9
Cowdenbeath	1934–35	Scottish Second Division	31	15	1	0	32	15
Career total			151	38	13	2	164	40

== Honours ==
- Cowdenbeath Hall of Fame
