= Hamill, South Dakota =

- CDP
- Location in Tripp County and the state of South Dakota
- Coordinates: 43°35′38″N 99°41′26″W
- Country: United States
- State: South Dakota
- County: Tripp

Area
  - Total: 1.25 sq mi (3.25 km^{2})
  - Land: 1.22 sq mi (3.16 km^{2})
  - Water: 0.031 sq mi (0.08 km^{2})
- Elevation: 1,798 ft (548 m)

Population (2020)
  - Total: 14
  - Density: 11.4/sq mi (4.42/km^{2})
- Time zone: UTC-6 (Central (CST))
  - Summer (DST): UTC-5 (CDT)
- ZIP code: 57534
- Area code: 605
- FIPS code: 46-26660
- GNIS feature ID: 2393037

Hamill is a census-designated place (CDP) in Tripp County, South Dakota, United States. The population was 14 at the 2020 census.

Hamill lies along No Moccasin Creek, a tributary of the White River. The creek is dammed near the town site to form Hamill Dam Reservoir.

== History ==
The town was started in April 1909 on the east side of No Moccasin Lake. Originally named Roseland, Hamill was renamed for Gail Hamill the pioneer merchant, postmaster and banker in town. In 1909 the Milwaukee Road surveyed a route from Oacoma, South Dakota through Roseland and beyond but the line was never built.

Carrie Ingalls (sister of Little House on the Prairie's Laura Ingalls Wilder) was transferred to the local newspaper; Roseland Review in 1910, from Pedro, South Dakota.

== Demographics ==
Historical population
Census	Pop.	Note	%±
2020	14		—
U.S. Decennial Census

As of the census of 2000, there were 11 people, 5 households, and 3 families residing in Hamill. The population density was 9.0 people per square mile (3.5/km^{2}). There were 7 housing units at an average density of 5.7/sq mi (2.2/km^{2}). The racial makeup of the CDP was 100.00% White.

There were 5 households, out of which 20.0% had children under the age of 18 living with them, 40.0% were married couples living together, and 40.0% were non-families. 40.0% of all households were made up of individuals, and 20.0% had someone living alone who was 65 years of age or older. The average household size was 2.20 and the average family size was 3.00.

In Hamill, the population was spread out, with 18.2% under the age of 18, 27.3% from 25 to 44, 9.1% from 45 to 64, and 45.5% who were 65 years of age or older. The median age was 62 years. For every 100 females, there were 83.3 males. For every 100 females age 18 and over, there were 80.0 males.

The median income for a household in Hamill was $42,500, and the median income for a family was $42,500. Males had a median income of $15,000 versus $16,250 for females. The per capita income for Hamill was $11,833. None of the population or families were below the poverty line.
