= The Fix (opera) =

THE FIX
- Opera by Joel Puckett
- Librettist: Eric Simonson
- Premiere: March 6, 2019; Minnesota Opera, Ordway Theater Saint Paul

The Fix is an opera by composer Joel Puckett and librettist Eric Simonson. As The Fix: Opera in Two Acts the work received its world premiere at the Ordway Theater, Saint Paul, Minnesota, on March 16, 2019, under the directorship and dramaturgy of Eric Simonson.

== Background ==
The opera was commissioned by Minnesota Opera as part of its New Works Initiative. This was the first opera written by both the composer and the librettist.

== Roles ==
Role	Voice type	Premiere cast, March 16, 2019 (Conductor: Timothy Myers)
The Chicago White Sox
Shoeless Joe Jackson,	tenor	Joshua Dennis
Chick Gandil,	bass	Wei Wu
Eddie Cicotte	baritone	Calvin Griffin
Lefty Williams	baritone	Sidney Outlaw
Buck Weaver	baritone	Christian Thurston
Happy Felsch	tenor	David Walton
Swede Risberg	tenor	Christian Sanders
Fred McMullin	baritone	Nicholas Davis
Ray Cracker Schalk	tenor	Stephen Martin
Charles Comiskey	bass	Wm. Clay Thompson
The Gamblers
Sleepy Bill Burns	baritone	Andrew Wilkowske
Arnold Rothstein	baritone	Charles Eaton
Abe Attell	tenor	Brian Wallin
The Civilians
Katie Jackson	soprano	Jasmine Habersham
Ring Lardner	baritone	Kelly Markgraf
Hugh Fullerton	tenor	Dennis Peterson
Alfred Austrian, Esq.	bass	Benjamin Sieverding
Kenesaw Mountain Landis	bass	Christian Zaremba
Sox, Gamblers, and Civilians

== Synopsis ==
=== Act 1 ===
1919 “Shoeless” Joe Jackson, star slugger for the Chicago White Sox, is scolded by his wife, Katie, for signing a contract against his interests. She reminds him he is far too trusting of others.

Months later, the White Sox team looks forward to the World Series. Ring Lardner, optimistic reporter, extols the virtues of the “best team in the history of baseball” while his cynical counterpart, Hugh Fullerton, digs for dirt. Ace pitcher Lefty Williams pulls Joe aside and encourages him to consider a plan to “set things right” with cheapskate owner Charles Comiskey.

In New York, professional gambler “Sleepy” Bill Burns works with mobster Abe Attell to finance throwing the Series, while in Chicago eight players meet to discuss joining the conspiracy. Joe, the deciding vote, reluctantly agrees, and the fix is on.

Just before the first game, Ring and Hugh discuss rumors that the Sox will throw the Series. Ring refuses to believe it and waxes poetic about the virtues of “Shoeless” Joe. His spirits dampen when Sox ace pitcher, Eddie Cicotte, hits the first player up to bat.

Four games into the Series, the Sox are down three games to one. But Joe is having second thoughts. “It’s hard to play bad,” he tells Lefty. He convinces him that they and the others should, from now on, play to win.

At a Chicago bar, the Sox celebrate their second win in a row. Abe and Sleepy, nervous the Sox have gone against their word, threaten Joe with Katie's life if the Sox don't lose. Lefty, scheduled to pitch the next game, agrees to throw the game, and the Sox lose the Series.

=== Act 2 ===
A year later, the Sox are, once again, headed for the World Series. But the mood is different. Rumors of a fix the previous year have cast a dark cloud over the team. Despite having the best season of his career, Joe is consumed with guilt. His co-conspirators insist he keep his mouth shut.

Comiskey and lawyer Alfred Austrian meet newly elected baseball commissioner Judge Kenesaw Mountain Landis, who vows to scrub gambling from the sport. Alone, the two chiefs predict the demise of their all-star team, but see an opportunity to replenish their roster with young and inexpensive sluggers.

At a bar, Joe runs into Ring. He shames Joe, who runs home to Katie and confesses. Katie persuades Joe to come clean to Austrian and the public, and the “Black Sox” scandal is blown wide open.

At a sensational trial, the eight accused players face the scorn of Comiskey and the press. The public, however, is on the players’ side, and when a not guilty verdict is delivered, most celebrate. Katie and Joe's reprieve, though, is short-lived as Commissioner Landis declares the conspiring players banned from baseball for life, effectively ending their careers.

In an epilogue years later, Ray Schalk—now a baseball scout—runs into Ring, who has become an alcoholic and is suffering from tuberculosis. Ray tells him a story of running into Joe, now manager of a small dry goods store in South Carolina. In a flashback, we see Joe—run down and looking much older than his years—ashamed to recognize and acknowledge his former teammate.

Embracing the irony of the moment, Ring once again opines about the Joe that once was a boy from squalor, who made it big on nothing short of a dream.

== Critical reception ==
The original production of The Fix inspired a wide variety of strong critical opinions.

Parterre Box described it as "a delicately wrought, gorgeously orchestrated, beautifully sung paean to a lost American dream." "It towers above other premiere commissions here" and proclaimed, "Puckett should be a household word. He uses a fresh idiom inflected with a southern twang especially appropriate to the story of Shoeless Joe Jackson. He employs his large orchestra to create a kaleidoscope of delicate sonorities as well as grand orchestral gestures. The rhythms shift subtly with a certain relentless ticking and chiming that drives the tale forward. The music serves the libretto, often to a fault, and Puckett is unafraid of a swelling melody, the meat and potatoes of the standard repertoire."

Broadway World found it to be "a poetic requiem for the American Dream" and wrote, "Mn Opera's exceptional world premiere "The Fix" deserves expanding to other cities."

Star Tribune classical music critic, Terry Blain noted the music's lyricism writing, "Puckett’s music cast something of a halo around Shoeless Joe as he wrestled with the moral complexities of his situation. Tenor Joshua Dennis looked the part as the conflicted slugger, singing ardently in the soaringly lyrical music Puckett gave him for moments of introspection." Blain also found the show's social commentary compelling: "If ultimately “The Fix” veered somewhat precariously between entertainment and social analysis, it did raise serious questions about the role power and money continue to play in professional sports. For that, and for Puckett's playful, eerily suggestive music, “The Fix” is definitely worth seeing."

Lavender (magazine) critic John Townsend noted the strength of the "multiracial cast playing characters who were actual Caucasian persons a century ago" and found the show to be "one of those operas where you can just bathe in the waves of the music."

Opera critic Basil Considine criticized the text setting of The Fix, noting the unnatural rhythms in the recitative. He described the opera's musical idiom as "not anchored in common practice tonality, but not altogether far from it, either" and identified a central love motif. The Pioneer Press's Rob Hubbard noted Puckett “makes interesting use of the orchestra and has a cinematic flair for swells and surges of emotion, but it’s easy to tell that this is his first opera, for he rarely puts his best melodies into the mouths of the singers." Hubbard critiqued the libretto as "indecisive about whether to...be about real human frailty or something mythically American and bigger than us all." The Wall Street Journal panned the opera, describing it as a "minor-league effort" that "struck out".

== Awards ==
National Endowment for the Arts 2019 Art Works Grant
