= Boston Hotel Buckminster =

Historic hotel in Boston, Massachusetts

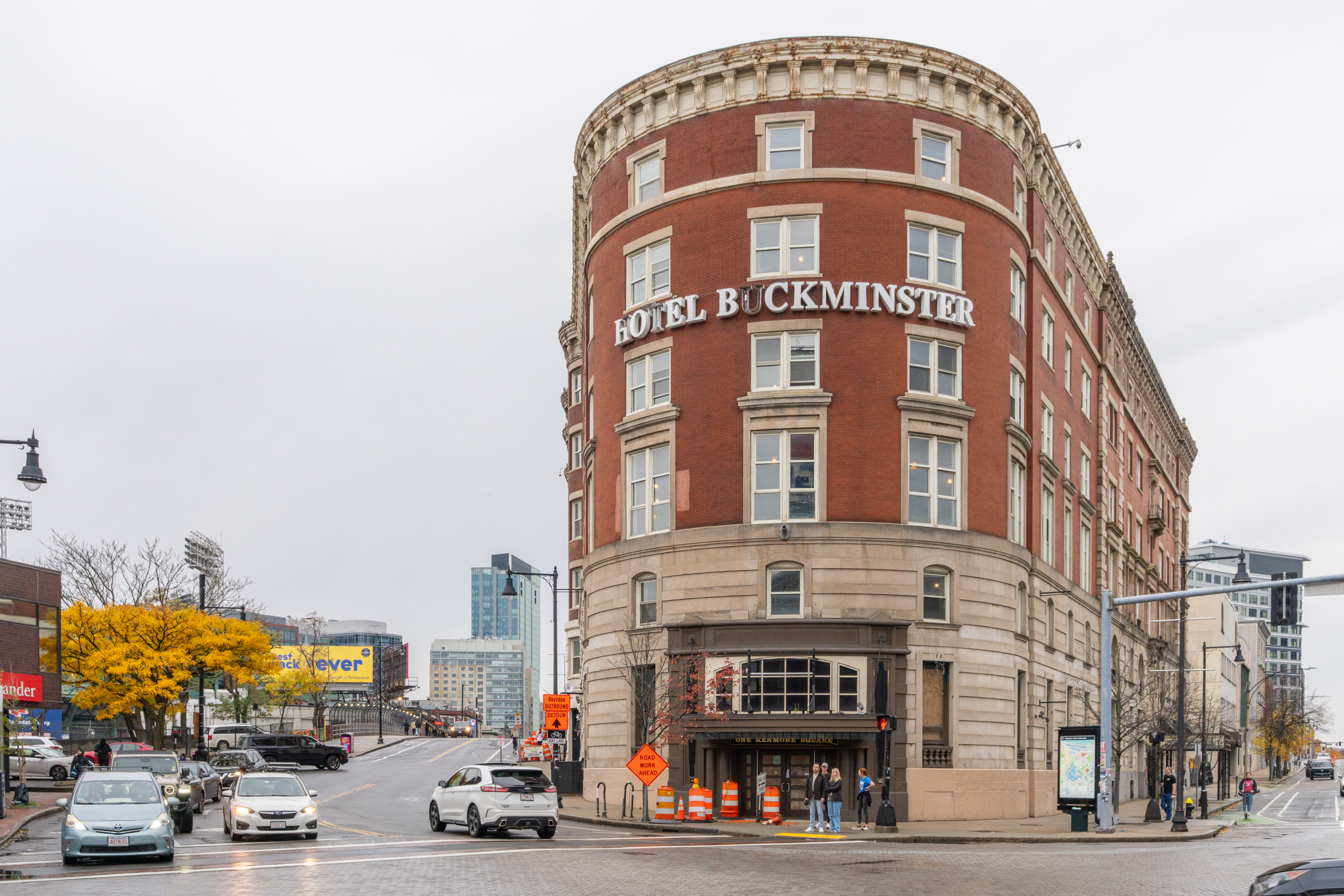
- (2025)
- Former names: Hotel Buckminster (1897-c. 1960s); Hotel St. George (circa 1960s); Leavitt Hall (1968-1970)

General information
- Location: 645 Beacon St. Boston, MA 02215
- Opened: 1897
- Closed: March 2020

Boston Hotel Buckminster, formerly Hotel Buckminster and briefly Hotel St. George, is a historic hotel in Boston, Massachusetts. It is located on the triangular intersection of Beacon Street and Brookline Avenue in Kenmore Square. Along with the Hotel Commonwealth, it is one of two hotels located within one block of Fenway Park, the oldest baseball stadium in the nation and home to the Boston Red Sox of Major League Baseball.

== History ==
=== Construction ===
The hotel, built in 1897, was designed for Arnold A. Rand by Boston architects Winslow & Wetherell, architects of many large hotels and office buildings. At the time of its construction, the Hotel Buckminster was one of the first hotels in Boston and the largest building in Kenmore Square.

=== Black Sox Scandal ===
On September 19, 1919, on a day that the Chicago White Sox defeated the Boston Red Sox at Fenway Park 3–2, bookmaker and gambler Joseph "Sport" Sullivan went to the Hotel Buckminster room of Arnold "Chick" Gandil, first baseman for the Chicago White Sox. There they conspired to fix the 1919 World Series, which was to take place thirteen days later, for personal gain. When the "Black Sox Scandal" was revealed it led to eight White Sox players, including Shoeless Joe Jackson, being banned from Major League Baseball for life. Also banned was Joe Gedeon, a second baseman for the St. Louis Browns who had placed a bet on the game and later informed to White Sox owner Charles Comiskey in hopes of getting a reward. The 1988 movie Eight Men Out is based on this scandal.

=== WNAC radio and television ===
In 1929, pioneer station WNAC Radio moved to new studios inside the Hotel Buckminster, with the entrance on the Brookline Avenue side (21 Brookline Avenue), which would become the station's home for the next four decades. WNAC made history in January 1923 by linking up with New York's WEAF for the first chain broadcast (it lasts for only five minutes), and later formed a new company known as the Yankee Network. A second station (WAAB) was added at the same location (eventually moving to Worcester as today's WVEI). A pioneer FM station was added in the late 1930s. Later, WNAC converted most of its studio space into one of Boston's first television studios and began broadcasting on Channel 7 in June, 1948. For the next twenty years, WNAC operated an AM, FM and television station in the hotel basement. During this time the station went through various facility upgrades and changes in ownership. One of its earliest and most successful radio announcers was Fred Lang (1910–1968), hired c. 1936, who read the news for Yankee network over WNAC through World War II: Lang also did Queen for a Day, the Tell-o-test Quiz Show, and a music show with a laid back flavor leading some to credit him with pioneering the "Easy Listening" style. However, with dwindling affiliates and an aging listening audience, the Yankee Network disbanded in 1967, with the flagship Boston station WNAC changing call letters to WRKO and becoming a Top 40 music station. The television station call letters WNAC-TV remained, and in 1968 the radio and TV operations moved to 7 Bulfinch Place, near Government Center .

=== World War II prisoner detention ===
A portion of the building was used in the 1940s by a detachment of military police for the purpose of holding Italian prisoners of war during World War II.

=== Storyville nightclub ===
In 1950, Boston native George Wein moved his Storyville nightclub to the ground floor of the Hotel Buckminster. A number of notable performers, especially jazz musicians, were featured in this new venue, including Louis Armstrong, Dave Brubeck, Red Garland, Erroll Garner, Billie Holiday, Charles Mingus, Charlie Parker, and Sarah Vaughan. Many made radio broadcasts from this location, some recordings of which still survive. In later decades, this venue hosted performers such as the Del Fuegos and the Violent Femmes. The space that housed Storyville was later occupied by a Pizzeria Uno restaurant, but as of 2020 that had also closed.

=== Renaming ===
A change in ownership in the 1960s led to the hotel being briefly renamed the Hotel St. George. The building was sold to Grahm Junior College in 1968 and was renamed Leavitt Hall. WNAC by this time had moved to brand new studios in Government Center but the college never made use of the radio and television production studios left behind in the basement because of financial reasons. A few years later, the building was sold again. After restorations, the building was renamed "Boston Hotel Buckminster" and has operated as a hotel and apartment building ever since. The Hotel Buckminster has 132 guest rooms and suites. Much of its advertising is based on its relatively low price for a hotel in Boston in very close proximity to attractions including Boston University, Charles River Reservation, the Emerald Necklace (especially Commonwealth Avenue Mall and the Back Bay Fens), Fenway Park, the Freedom Trail, Hynes Convention Center, the Isabella Stewart Gardner Museum, Lansdowne Street (home to entertainment venues including House of Blues), Newbury Street and the Prudential Center.

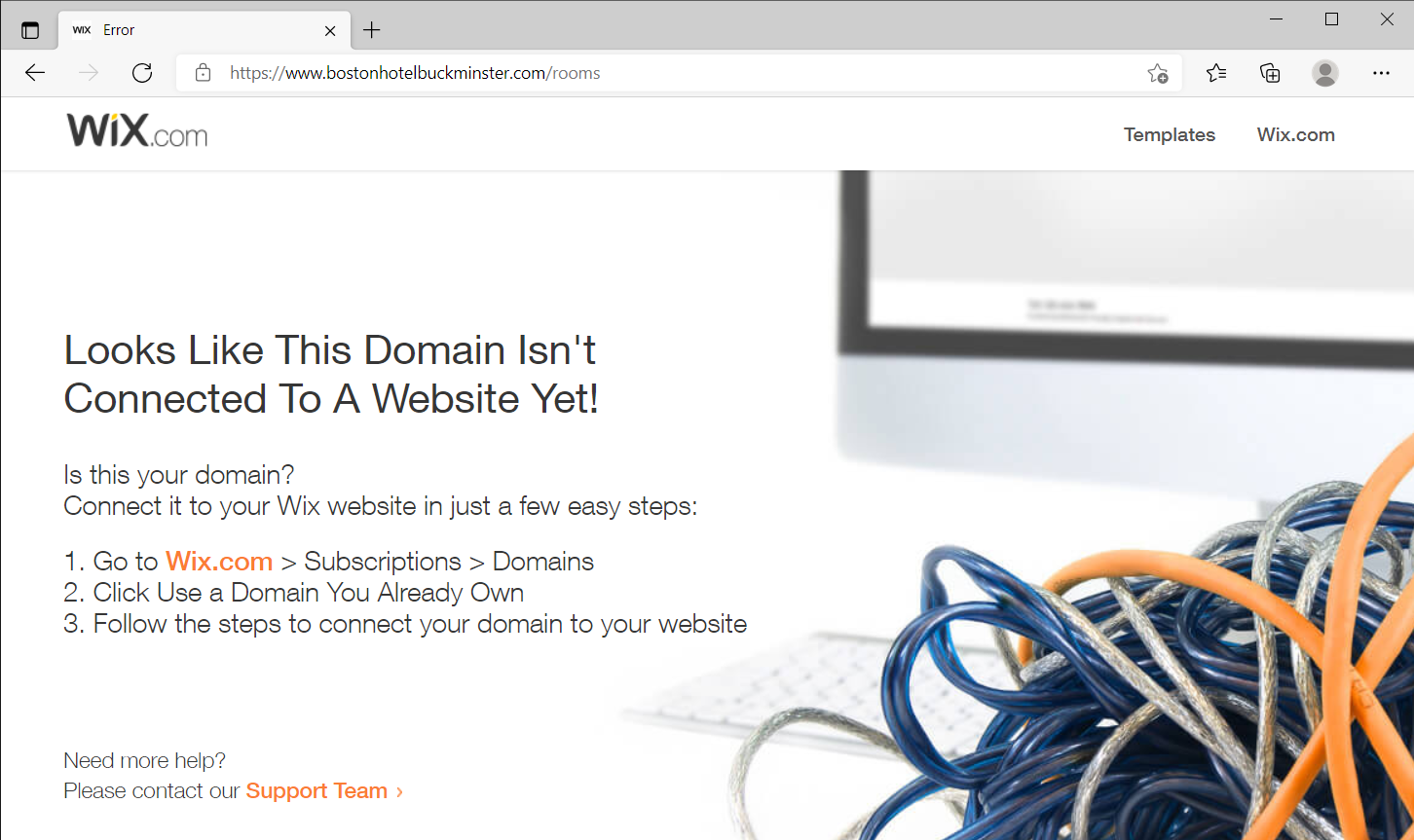
The hotel's official website, accessed on September 21, 2021

Kenmore Station, a subway stop on the Green Line that also has an above-ground bus terminal, is located on an adjacent city block and is the hotel's closest MBTA station.

In March 2020, the hotel announced on its Facebook page that it was closing due to the COVID-19 pandemic with no plans of reopening under the current management. The hotel's website was taken offline in June 2021.

In November 2021, real-estate developer IQHQ announced its acquisition of the Buckminster, serving its ongoing development plan on the adjacent lands in Fenway.
