= Black Sox Scandal =

1919 Baseball World Series scandal

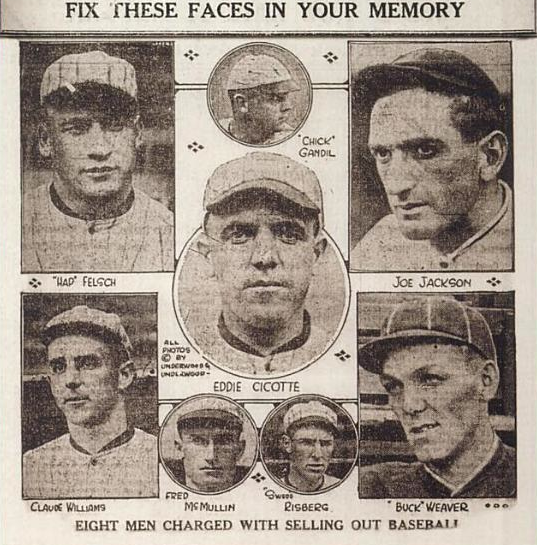
The eight "Chicago Black Sox"

The Black Sox Scandal was a game-fixing scandal in Major League Baseball (MLB) in which eight members of the Chicago White Sox were accused of intentionally losing the 1919 World Series against the Cincinnati Reds in exchange for payment from a gambling syndicate, possibly led by organized crime figure Arnold Rothstein. There is strong evidence both for and against Rothstein's involvement; however, there is no conclusive indication that the syndicate's actions were directed by or involved organized crime.

In response to the scandal, the National Baseball Commission was dissolved and Judge Kenesaw Mountain Landis was appointed to be the first commissioner of baseball, given absolute control over the sport to restore its integrity. Despite acquittals in a public trial in 1921, Landis permanently banned all eight implicated players from professional baseball. The Baseball Hall of Fame eventually defined the punishment as banishment from consideration for the Hall. Despite requests for reinstatement in the decades that followed (particularly in the case of Shoeless Joe Jackson), the ban remained in force for more than a century. In 2025, Commissioner Rob Manfred reinstated the Black Sox and several other now-deceased players.

== Background ==
=== Tension in the clubhouse and Charles Comiskey ===
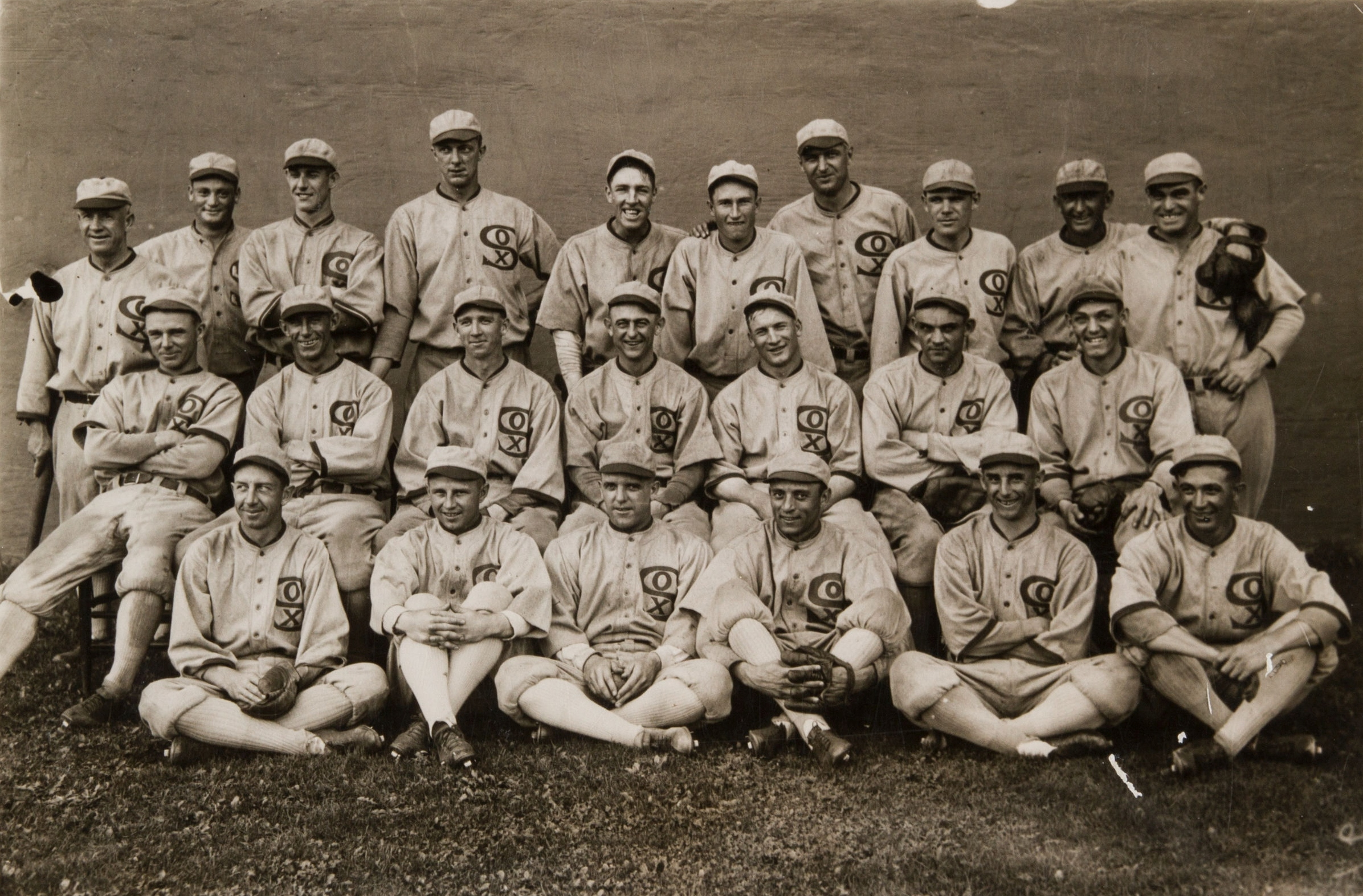
1919 Chicago White Sox team photo

In 1919, Charles Comiskey, the owner of the Chicago White Sox and a prominent Major League Baseball (MLB) player from 1882 to 1894, was widely resented by his players for his miserliness. Comiskey long had a reputation for underpaying players, even though the White Sox were one of the top teams in the league and had already won the 1917 World Series. This was a marked turnabout from Comiskey's days as a player, when he took part in the Players' League labor rebellion in 1890.

Because of baseball's reserve clause, any player who refused to accept a contract was prohibited from playing baseball on any other professional team under the auspices of "Organized Baseball." Players could change teams only with permission from their current team, and without a union, the players had no bargaining power. Comiskey was probably no worse than most owners of the time; in fact, the White Sox had the largest team payroll in 1919. In the era of the reserve clause, gamblers could find players on many teams looking for extra cash—and did.

The White Sox clubhouse was divided into two factions. One group resented the more straitlaced players (later called the "Clean Sox"), a group that included second baseman Eddie Collins, catcher Ray Schalk, and pitchers Red Faber and Dickie Kerr. By contemporary accounts, the two factions rarely spoke to each other on or off the field, and the only thing they had in common was a resentment of Comiskey.

=== The conspiracy ===
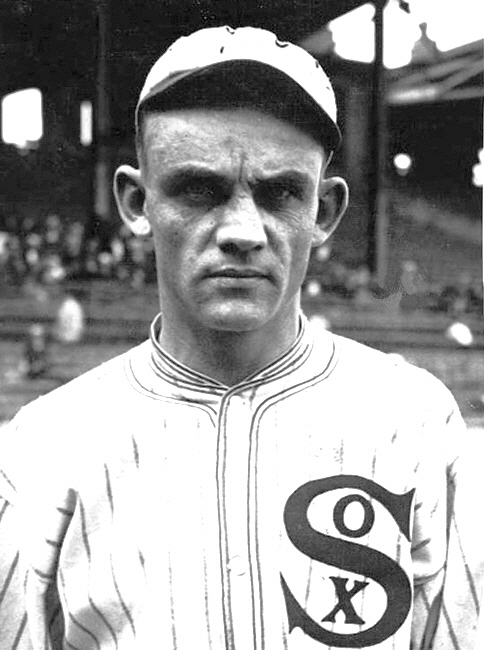
Chick Gandil, the mastermind of the scandal

On September 18, 1919, White Sox player Chick Gandil met with Joe "Sport" Sullivan, a Boston bookmaker, at the Hotel Buckminster near Fenway Park. The two men discussed plans to throw their upcoming series with the Cincinnati Reds for $80,000 ($1,575,000 in September 2025). Two days later, a meeting of White Sox players—including those committed to going ahead with the fix and those just ready to listen to the proposal—took place in Gandil's room at the Ansonia Hotel in New York City. Buck Weaver, the team's third baseman, was the only player to attend the meetings who did not receive money; nevertheless, he was later banned along with the other seven Black Sox for knowing about the fix but not reporting it.

Although he hardly played in the series, utility infielder Fred McMullin heard about the fix and threatened to report the others unless he was in on the payoff. As a small coincidence, McMullin was a former teammate of retired player William "Sleepy Bill" Burns, who had a minor role in the fix. Both had played for the Los Angeles Angels of the Pacific Coast League (PCL), and Burns had previously pitched for the White Sox in 1909 and 1910. Star outfielder "Shoeless Joe" Jackson was mentioned as a participant but did not attend the meetings, and his involvement remains disputed.

The scheme got an unexpected boost when the straitlaced Faber could not pitch due to getting sick with the flu. Years later, Schalk said the fix would not have happened if Faber had been available. According to Schalk, since Faber was the ace of the staff, he would almost certainly have gotten starts that went instead to two of the alleged conspirators, pitchers Eddie "Knuckles" Cicotte and Lefty Williams.

== Conduct of the World Series ==
On October 1, the day of Game One, there were rumors amongst gamblers that the World Series was fixed, and a sudden influx of money being bet on Cincinnati caused the odds against them to fall rapidly. These rumors also reached the press box where several correspondents, including Hugh Fullerton of the Chicago Herald and Examiner and ex-player and manager Christy Mathewson, resolved to compare notes on any plays and players that they felt were questionable. However, most fans and observers were taking the series at face value. On October 2, the Philadelphia Bulletin published a poem which would quickly prove to be ironic:

Still, it really doesn't matter,
After all, who wins the flag.
Good clean sport is what we're after,
And we aim to make our brag
To each near or distant nation
Whereon shines the sporting sun
That of all our games gymnastic
Base ball is the cleanest one!

After throwing a strike with his first pitch of the Series, Cicotte's second pitch struck Cincinnati leadoff hitter Morrie Rath in the back, delivering a pre-arranged signal confirming the players' willingness to go through with the fix. In the fourth inning, Cicotte made a bad throw to Swede Risberg at second base. Sportswriters found the unsuccessful double play to be suspicious.

Williams lost three games, a Series record. Kerr, a rookie who was not part of the fix, won both of his starts. However, the gamblers were now reneging on their promised progress payments (to be paid after each game lost), claiming that all the money was let out on bets and was in the hands of the bookmakers. After Game Five, angry about the non-payment of promised money, the players involved in the fix attempted to doublecross the gamblers and won Games Six and Seven of the best-of-nine Series. Before Game Eight, threats of violence were made on the gamblers' behalf against players and family members. Williams started Game Eight but gave up four straight one-out hits for three runs before manager Kid Gleason relieved him. The White Sox lost Game Eight (and the series) on October 9, 1919. Besides Weaver, the players involved in the scandal received $5,000 each (equivalent to $93,000 in 2025) or more, with Gandil taking $35,000 (equivalent to $650,000 in 2025).

== Fallout ==
=== Grand jury (1920) ===
Rumors of the fix dogged the White Sox throughout the 1920 season as they battled the Cleveland Indians for the American League pennant, and stories of corruption touched players on other clubs as well. At last, in September 1920, a grand jury was convened to investigate; Cicotte confessed to his participation in the fix to the grand jury on September 28.

On the eve of their final season series, the White Sox were in a virtual tie for first place with the Indians. The Sox would need to win all three of their remaining games and then hope for Cleveland to stumble, as the Indians had more games left to play than the Sox. Despite the season being on the line, Comiskey suspended the seven White Sox still in the majors (Gandil had not returned to the team in 1920 and was playing semi-pro ball). He later said he had no choice but to suspend them, even though this action likely cost the Sox any chance of winning a second pennant. The Sox lost two of the three games in the final series against the St. Louis Browns and finished in second place, two games behind the Indians, who went on to win the 1920 World Series.

The grand jury issued its decision on October 22, 1920, and eight players and five gamblers were implicated. The indictments included nine counts of conspiracy to defraud. The ten players not implicated in the scandal, as well as manager Kid Gleason, were each given $1,500 bonus checks (equivalent to $24,100 in 2025) by Comiskey in October 1920, the amount equaling the difference between the winners' and losers' share for participation in the 1919 Series.

=== Trial (1921) ===
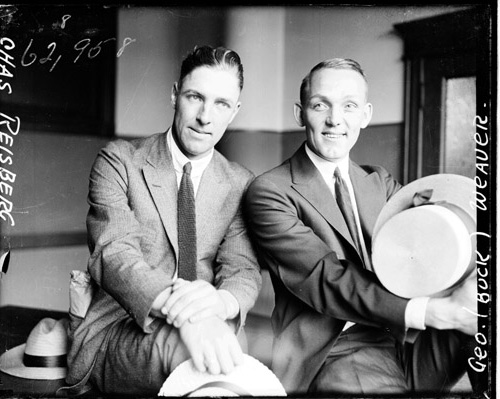
Infielders Swede Risberg (left) and Buck Weaver during their 1921 trial

The trial commenced in Chicago on June 27, 1921, but was delayed by Judge Hugo Friend because two defendants, Ben Franklin and Carl Zork, claimed to be ill. Right fielder Shano Collins was named as the wronged party in the indictments, accusing his corrupt teammates of having cost him $1,784 as a result of the scandal. Before the trial, key evidence went missing from the Cook County courthouse, including the signed confessions of Cicotte and Jackson, who subsequently recanted their confessions. Some years later, the missing confessions reappeared in the possession of Comiskey's lawyer.

On July 1, the prosecution announced that Burns, who was under indictment for his part in the scandal, had turned state's evidence and would testify. During jury selection on July 11, several members of the current White Sox team, including Gleason, visited the courthouse, chatting and shaking hands with the indicted ex-players; at one point they even tickled Weaver, who was known to be quite ticklish. Jury selection took several days, but on July 15 twelve jurors were finally empaneled in the case.

Trial testimony began on July 18, when prosecutor Charles Gorman outlined the evidence he planned to present against the defendants. According to a contemporaneous description from The New York Times:

The spectators added to the bleacher appearance of the courtroom, for most of them sweltered in shirtsleeves, and collars were few. Scores of small boys jammed their way into the seats, and as Mr. Gorman told of the alleged sell-out, they repeatedly looked at each other in awe, remarking under their breaths: 'What do you think of that?' or 'Well, I'll be darned.'

Comiskey was then called to the stand, and became so agitated with questions being posed by the defense that he rose from the witness chair and shook his fist at the defendants' counsel, Ben Short.

The most explosive testimony began the following day, July 19, when Burns admitted that members of the White Sox had intentionally fixed the 1919 Series; Burns mentioned the involvement of organized crime figure Arnold Rothstein, among others, and testified that Cicotte had threatened to throw the ball clear out of the park if needed to lose a game. After additional testimony and evidence, on July 28 the defense rested and the case went to the jury. The jury deliberated for less than three hours before returning verdicts of not guilty on all charges for all of the accused players.

=== Judge Landis appointed Commissioner, bans all eight players (1921) ===
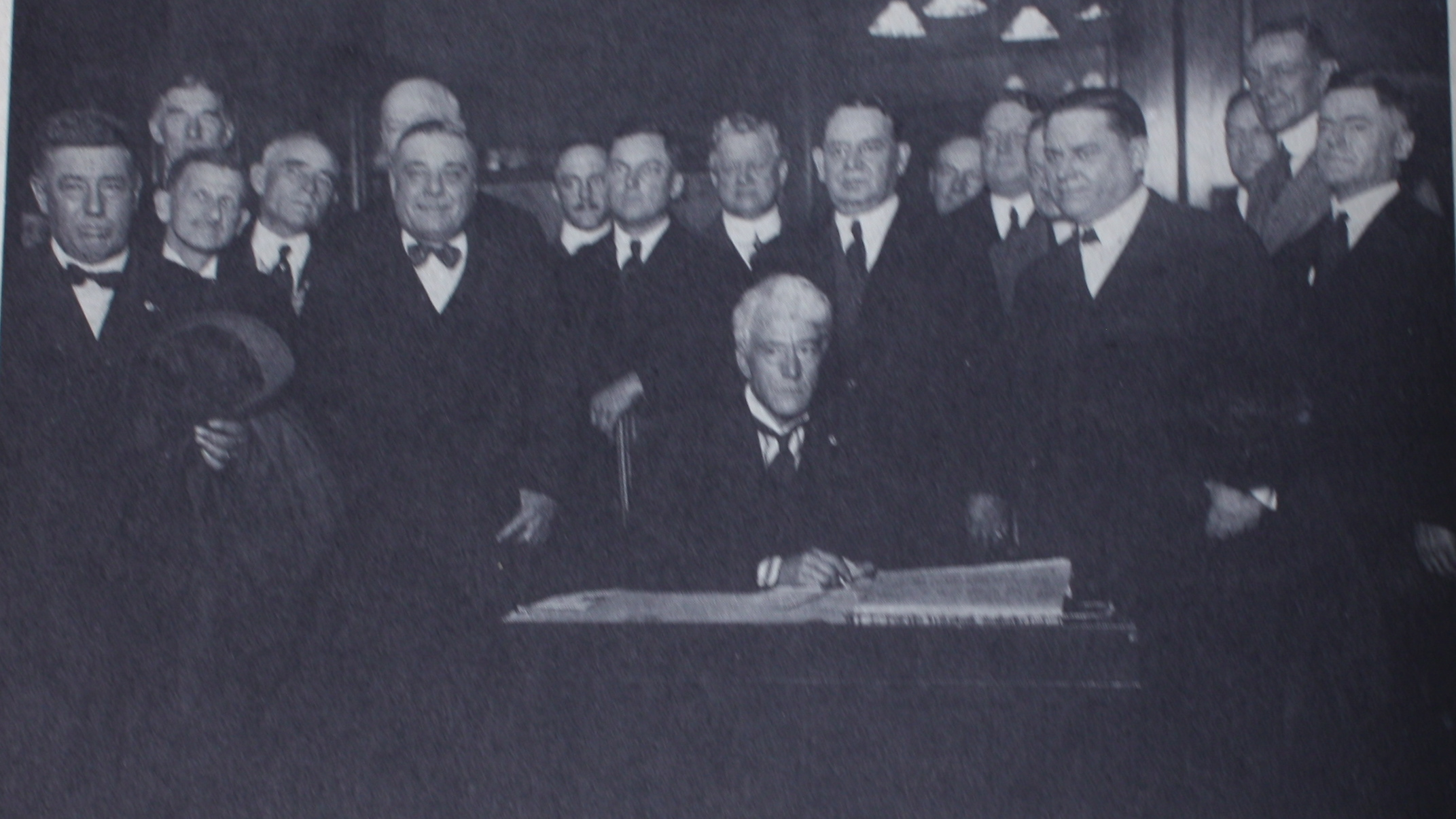
Judge Kenesaw Mountain Landis signs the agreement to become Commissioner of Baseball, November 12, 1920.

Long before the scandal broke, many of baseball's owners had nursed longstanding grievances with the way the game was then governed by the National Baseball Commission. The Black Sox scandal and the damage it caused to the game's reputation gave owners the resolve to make significant changes to the governance of the sport. Their original plan was to appoint the widely respected federal judge and noted baseball fan Kenesaw Mountain Landis to head a reformed three-member commission comprising men unconnected to baseball. However, Landis made it clear to the owners that he would accept only an appointment as the game's sole commissioner, and even then only on the condition that he be granted essentially unchecked power over the sport. Desperate to clean up the game's image, the owners agreed to his terms and vested him with virtually unlimited authority over everyone in the major and minor leagues. It was controversial at the time for MLB to move toward a single commissioner with sole governance on behalf of the owners.

Upon taking office before the 1921 season, one of Landis' first acts as commissioner was to use his new powers to place the eight implicated players on an "ineligible list", a decision that effectively left them suspended indefinitely from all of "organized" professional baseball (although not from semi-pro barnstorming teams). Following their acquittals, Landis quickly quashed any prospect that he might reinstate the accused players. On August 3, 1921, the day after the acquittals, Judge Landis issued his own verdict:

Regardless of the verdict of juries, no player who throws a ball game, no player who undertakes or promises to throw a ball game, no player who sits in confidence with a bunch of crooked ballplayers and gamblers, where the ways and means of throwing a game are discussed and does not promptly tell his club about it, will ever play professional baseball.

Making use of a precedent that had previously seen Babe Borton, Harl Maggert, Gene Dale and Bill Rumler banned from the PCL for fixing games, Landis made it clear that all eight accused players would remain on the "ineligible list," banning them from organized baseball. Landis took the position that while the players had been acquitted in court, there was no dispute they had broken the rules of baseball, and none of them could ever be allowed back in the game if it were to regain the public's trust. Comiskey supported Landis by giving the seven who remained under contract to the White Sox their unconditional release.

Following the commissioner's statement, it was universally understood that all eight implicated players were to be banned from professional baseball for life. Landis, relying upon his years of experience as a federal judge and attorney, used this decision (the "case") as the founding precedent (of the reorganized majors) for the Commissioner of Baseball to be the highest and final authority over baseball as an organized, professional sport in the United States. He established the precedent that the league vested the commissioner with plenary power and the responsibility to determine the fitness or suitability of anyone, anything, or any circumstance, to be associated with professional baseball, past, present and future.

==== Banned players ====
Landis banned eight members of the 1919 White Sox for their involvement in the fix:

- Arnold "Chick" Gandil, first baseman. The ringleader of the players who were in on the fix. He did not play in the majors in 1920; he played semi-pro ball instead. In a 1956 Sports Illustrated article, Gandil expressed remorse for the fix. Still, he wrote that the players had actually abandoned the scheme when it became apparent that they would be watched closely. According to Gandil, the players' numerous errors resulted from fear of being watched. However, he conceded that the players deserved to be banned just for talking to the gamblers.
- Eddie Cicotte, pitcher. Admitted involvement in the fix.
- Oscar "Happy" Felsch, center fielder.
- "Shoeless" Joe Jackson, the star outfielder and one of the best hitters in the game. Jackson confessed in sworn grand jury testimony to having accepted $5,000 in cash from the gamblers. It was also Jackson's sworn testimony that he never met or spoke to any of the gamblers and was told about the fix only through conversations with other White Sox players. The other participants informed Jackson that he would receive $20,000 in cash divided into equal payments after each loss. Jackson testified that he played to win in the entire Series and did nothing on the field to throw any of the games in any way. His roommate, pitcher Lefty Williams, brought $5,000 in cash to their hotel room after losing Game Four and threw it down as they were packing to travel back to Cincinnati; this was the only money that Jackson received at any time. Jackson later recanted his confession and professed his innocence to no effect until his death in 1951. The extent of his collaboration with the scheme is hotly debated.
- Fred McMullin, utility infielder. McMullin would not have been included in the fix had he not overheard the other players' conversations. His role as team scout may have had more impact on the fix since he saw minimal playing time in the series.
- Charles "Swede" Risberg, shortstop. Risberg was Gandil's assistant and the "muscle" of the playing group. He went 2-for-25 at the plate and committed four errors in the series.
- George "Buck" Weaver, third baseman. Weaver attended the initial meetings, and while he did not go in on the fix, he knew about it. In an interview in 1956, Gandil said that it was Weaver's idea to receive the money upfront from the gamblers. Landis banished Weaver on this basis, stating, "Men associating with crooks and gamblers could expect no leniency." On January 13, 1922, Weaver unsuccessfully applied for reinstatement. Like Jackson, he continued to profess his innocence to successive baseball commissioners to no effect.
- Claude "Lefty" Williams, pitcher. Went 0–3 with a 6.63 ERA for the series. Only one other pitcher in baseball history, reliever George Frazier of the 1981 New York Yankees, has ever lost three games in one World Series. The third game Williams lost was Game Eight; baseball's decision to revert to a best-of-seven Series in 1922 significantly reduced the opportunity for a pitcher to obtain three decisions in a Series.

Also banned was Joe Gedeon, second baseman for the St. Louis Browns. A friend of Risberg, Gedeon learned about the fix from Risberg and placed bets on Cincinnati. He informed Comiskey of the fix after the Series to gain a reward. Instead, Landis banned him for life along with the eight White Sox.

==== Joe Jackson ====
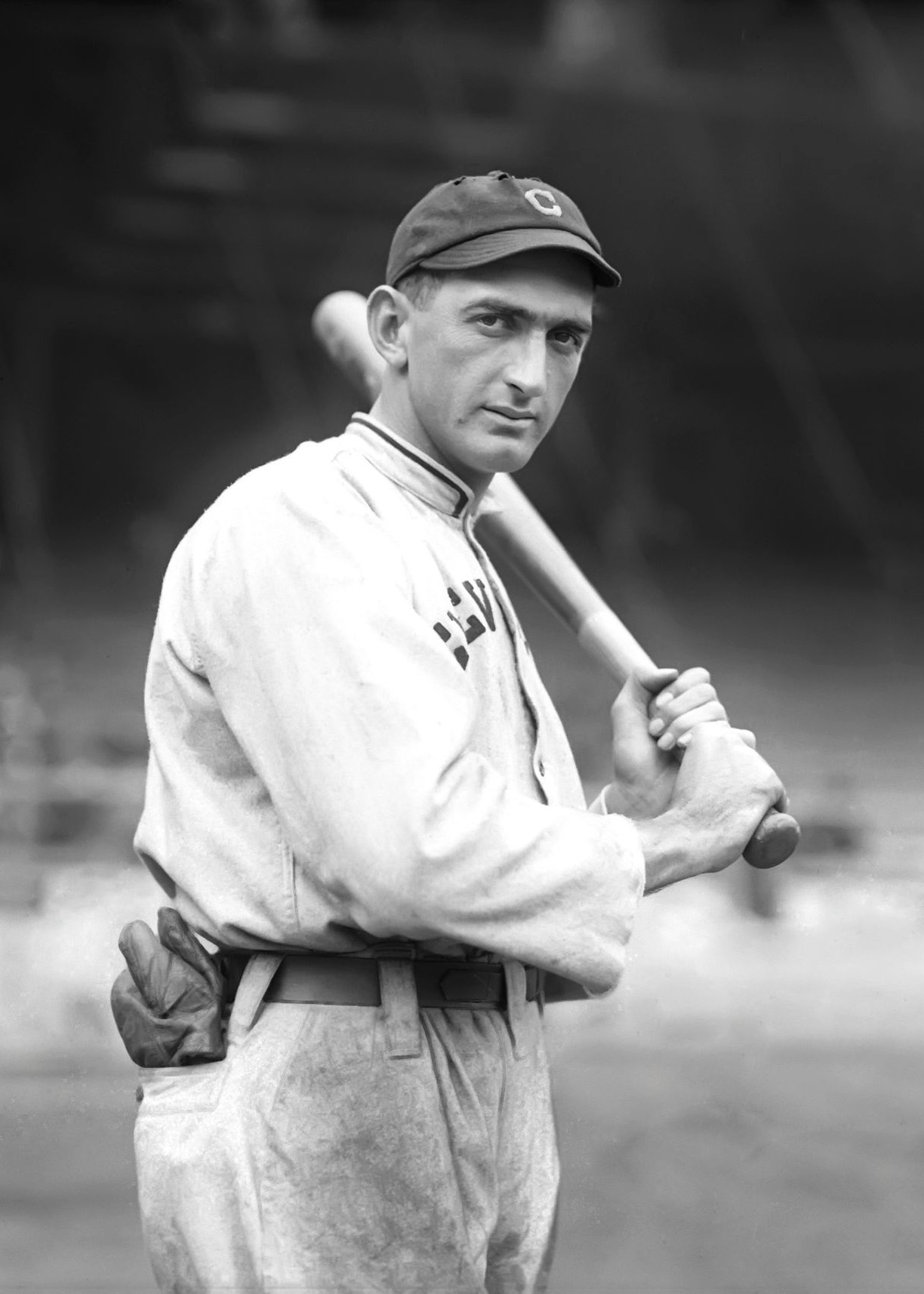
Shoeless Joe Jackson

The extent of Jackson's part in the scheme remains controversial. He had a Series-leading .375 batting average—including the Series' only home run—threw out five baserunners and handled thirty chances in the outfield with no errors. In general, players perform worse in games their team loses, and Jackson batted worse in the five games that the White Sox lost, with a batting average of .286 in losing games. This was still an above-average batting average (the National and American Leagues hit a combined .263 in the 1919 season). Jackson hit .351 for the season, fourth-best in the major leagues (his .356 career batting average is the fourth-best in history, surpassed only by Ty Cobb, Oscar Charleston and Rogers Hornsby) – each an MLB batting average leader. Three of his six RBIs came in the losses, including the aforementioned home run, and a double in Game Eight when the Reds had a significant lead and the series was all but over. Still, in that game, a long foul ball was caught at the fence with runners on second and third, depriving Jackson of a chance to drive in the runners.

One play in particular has been subjected to scrutiny. In the fifth inning of Game Four, with a Cincinnati player on second, Jackson fielded a single hit to left field and threw home, which was cut off by Cicotte. Gandil later admitted to yelling at Cicotte to intercept the throw. The run scored, and the Sox lost 2–0. Cicotte, whose guilt is undisputed, made two errors in that fifth inning alone.

Years later, all the implicated players said that Jackson was never present at their meetings with the gamblers. Williams, Jackson's roommate, later said they mentioned Jackson only in hopes of giving them more credibility with the gamblers.

=== Aftermath ===
After being banned, Risberg and several other members of the Black Sox tried to organize a three-state barnstorming tour. However, they were forced to cancel those plans after Landis let it be known that anyone who played with or against them would also be banned from baseball for life. They then announced plans to play a regular exhibition game every Sunday in Chicago, but the Chicago City Council threatened to cancel the license of any ballpark that hosted them.

With seven of their best players permanently sidelined, the White Sox crashed into seventh place in 1921 and would not be a contender in a pennant race again until 1936, five years after Comiskey's death. They would not win another American League championship until 1959 (a then-record forty-year gap) nor another World Series until 2005, prompting some to comment about a Curse of the Black Sox.

=== Name ===
Although many believe the Black Sox name to be related to the dark and corrupt nature of the conspiracy, the term "Black Sox" may already have existed before the fix. There is a story that the name "Black Sox" derived from Comiskey's refusal to pay for the players' uniforms to be laundered, instead insisting that the players themselves pay for the cleaning. As the story goes, the players refused, and subsequent games saw the White Sox play in progressively filthier uniforms as dirt, sweat and grime collected on the white, woolen uniforms until they took on a much darker shade. Comiskey then had the uniforms washed and deducted the laundry bill from the players' salaries. On the other hand, Eliot Asinof in his book Eight Men Out makes no such connection, mentioning the filthy uniforms early on but referring to the term "Black Sox" only in connection with the scandal.

== Popular culture ==
=== Literature ===
- Eliot Asinof's book Eight Men Out: The Black Sox and the 1919 World Series, while initially considered a definitive account of the scandal, was later found to have taken numerous liberties with the facts of the story. Many details will forever be lost to history, as Asinof's 1963 book was considered the definitive historical record upon which later anthologies relied; by the time it was discovered that the book was unreliable, nearly all the original participants had died.
- Brendan Boyd's novel Blue Ruin: A Novel of the 1919 World Series offers a first-person narrative of the event from the perspective of "Sport" Sullivan, a Boston gambler involved in fixing the series.
- In F. Scott Fitzgerald's novel The Great Gatsby, a minor character named Meyer Wolfsheim is said to have helped in the Black Sox scandal, though this is purely fictional. In explanatory notes accompanying the novel's 75th-anniversary edition, editor Matthew Bruccoli describes the character as being based on Arnold Rothstein.
- In Dan Gutman's novel Shoeless Joe & Me (2002), the protagonist, Joe, goes back in time to try to prevent Shoeless Joe Jackson from being banned for life.
- W. P. Kinsella's novel Shoeless Joe is the story of an Iowa farmer who builds a baseball field in his cornfield after hearing a mysterious voice. Later, Shoeless Joe Jackson and other members of the Black Sox come to play on his field. The novel was adapted into the film Field of Dreams (1989). Jackson plays a central role in inspiring protagonist Ray Kinsella to reconcile with his past.
- Bernard Malamud's 1952 novel The Natural and its 1984 filmed dramatization of the same name were inspired significantly by the events of the scandal.
- Harry Stein's novel Hoopla, alternately co-narrated by Buck Weaver and Luther Pond, a fictitious New York Daily News columnist, attempts to view the Black Sox Scandal from Weaver's perspective.
- Dan Elish's book The Black Sox Scandal of 1919 gives a general overview.
- The Black Sox Scandal: The History And Legacy Of America's Most Notorious Sports Controversy by Charles River Editors talks about the events surrounding the scandal and describes the people involved.
- "Go! Go! Go! Forty Years Ago", Nelson Algren, Chicago Sun-Times, 1959
- "Ballet for Opening Day: The Swede Was a Hard Guy" Algren, Nelson. The Southern Review, Baton Rouge. Spring 1942: p. 873.
- "The Last Carousel" by Nelson Algren, 1973, Seven Stories Press, New York 1997 (both Algren stories are included in this collection)

=== Film ===
- In the film The Godfather Part II (1974), the fictional gangster Hyman Roth alludes to the scandal when he says, "I've loved baseball ever since Arnold Rothstein fixed the World Series in 1919".
- Director John Sayles' Eight Men Out (1988) is a dramatized adaptation of Asinof's book, focusing largely on Buck Weaver (played by John Cusack) as the one banned player who did not take any money. Also starring in the film are Charlie Sheen (Hap Felsch), Michael Rooker (Chick Gandil), David Strathairn (Eddie Cicotte), John Mahoney (Kid Gleason), Christopher Lloyd ("Sleepy" Bill Burns), Clifton James (Charles Comiskey) and D. B. Sweeney (Shoeless Joe Jackson). Sayles himself portrays sportswriter Ring Lardner.
- Field of Dreams (1989), based upon the novel Shoeless Joe by W. P. Kinsella, discusses the scandal and features two of the players involved: Joe Jackson (Ray Liotta), who plays a large part in the film; and Eddie Cicotte (Steve Eastin). Field of Dreams starred Kevin Costner, Amy Madigan and James Earl Jones.
- The Great Gatsby (2013), based on the novel by F. Scott Fitzgerald, speaks of the man who fixed the 1919 World Series.

=== Television ===
- In the first season of Boardwalk Empire and the second season, the scandal is a significant subplot involving Arnold Rothstein, Lucky Luciano and their associates.
- In the fifth season of Mad Men, Roger Sterling tries LSD for the first time and hallucinates that he is at the infamous game.
- In the second season of Frankie Drake Mysteries, morality officer Mary Shaw mentions the scandal while helping Frankie investigate the murder of a player with circumstances related to gambling.
- The story of the scandal was narrated by Katie Nolan in the sixth season of Drunk History with the reenactment starring Jake Johnson and Eric Edelstein.
- In episode 10, Rookie of the Year (Screen Directors Playhouse), Ward Bond plays a fictional character based on Shoeless Joe.

=== Music ===
- Murray Head's 1975 album Say It Ain't So takes its name after an apocryphal question put to Shoeless Joe Jackson during the court case.
- On Jonathan Coulton's album Smoking Monkey, his song "Kenesaw Mountain Landis" greatly fictionalizes the commissioner's quest to ban Jackson from baseball in the style of a tall tale.

=== Theatre ===
- 1919: A Baseball Opera, is a musical by Composer/lyricist Rusty Magee and Rob Barron, which premiered in June 1981 at Yale Repertory Theatre.
- The Fix is an opera by composer Joel Puckett with libretto by Eric Simonson, which premiered March 16, 2019 at the Ordway Center for the Performing Arts.
- The 2023 musical adaptation of The Great Gatsby features the same reference to fixing the World Series as the original book and 2013 movie.

== See also ==
- Dowd Report, which led to the banishment of all-time hits leader Pete Rose as a result of gambling.
- Black Mist Scandal, a similar match-fixing scandal in Japanese baseball
- Major League Baseball scandals
- List of people banned from Major League Baseball
