= Bill Burns (baseball) =

American Major League Baseball pitcher (1880–1953)

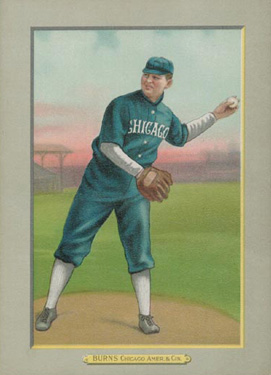
- 1910 baseball card of Burns
- Pitcher
- Born: January 27, 1880; San Saba, Texas, U.S.
- Died: June 6, 1953 (aged 73); Ramona, California, U.S.
- Batted: Both Threw: Left

MLB debut
- April 18, 1908, for the Washington Senators

Last MLB appearance
- May 23, 1912, for the Detroit Tigers

MLB statistics
- Win–loss record: 30–52
- Earned run average: 2.72
- Strikeouts: 233
- Stats at Baseball Reference

Teams
- Washington Senators (1908–1909); Chicago White Sox (1909–1910); Cincinnati Reds (1910–1911); Philadelphia Phillies (1911); Detroit Tigers (1912)

William Thomas Burns (January 27, 1880 – June 6, 1953), nicknamed "Sleepy Bill", was an American professional baseball player who played as a pitcher in Major League Baseball (MLB) for five different teams from 1908 to 1912. He earned his nickname for his noticeable lack of intensity on the mound. Burns is best known for his involvement in the alleged fixing of the 1919 World Series, dubbed the Black Sox Scandal.

== Baseball career ==
Burns played in the minor leagues from 1906 to 1907. In 1907, he won a career-high 24 games with the Los Angeles Angels of the Pacific Coast League.

In his five-year MLB career, Burns played for the Washington Senators, Chicago White Sox, Cincinnati Reds, Philadelphia Phillies, and Detroit Tigers. In his rookie season, 1908, Burns had a 1.69 earned run average (ERA), which was sixth best in the American League. However, he had an MLB career record of 30–52 as a pitcher and never won more than eight games in a season.

Pitching against the Tigers on May 21, 1908, Burns's bid for a no-hitter ended after 8 2/3 innings when Germany Schaefer singled to drive in the game's only run. On July 31, 1909, now pitching for the White Sox against Walter Johnson and the Senators, Burns again was one out from a no-hitter when it was broken up. This made him the first pitcher in baseball history to suffer this fate twice, a feat not repeated until Dave Stieb lost no-hitters with two outs in the ninth inning in consecutive starts on September 24 and 30, 1988. Stieb would go on to break Burns's record on August 4, 1989, this time losing a perfect game with one out to go.

After his major league career ended, Burns played in the minor leagues from 1912 to 1917.

== Black Sox Scandal ==
Prior to the start of the 1919 World Series, a group of players from the Chicago White Sox agreed to intentionally lose the series in exchange for money from gamblers. Burns met with Eddie Cicotte and Chick Gandil at The Ansonia, a hotel in New York City during the formative stages of the event.

It is likely that Burns operated on behalf of Arnold Rothstein, a New York businessman and gambler. Burns relayed messages back and forth between the players who had agreed to fix the games and a person whose initials were "A .R.". Burns lost money betting on the series.

After news of the scandal broke, a trial took place in Chicago. During this trial, Burns served as a witness for the prosecution. Assistant State Attorney Edward Prindeville examined Burns during the trial. Burns testified:

I told them I had the hundred thousand dollars to handle the throwing of the World Series. I also told them that I had the names of the men who were going to finance it. I told them they were waiting below.

In the 1988 film Eight Men Out, Burns was portrayed by actor Christopher Lloyd.
