= Morrie Rath =

American baseball player (1887–1945)

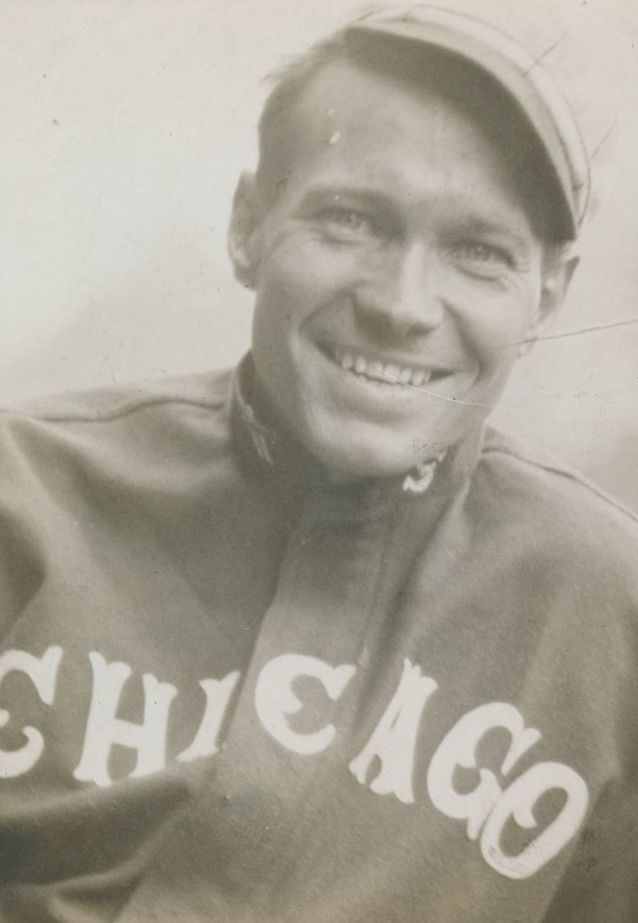
- Rath with the Chicago White Sox in 1912
- Second baseman
- Born: December 25, 1887; Mobeetie, Texas, U.S.
- Died: November 18, 1945 (aged 57); Upper Darby Township, Pennsylvania, U.S.
- Batted: Left Threw: Right

MLB debut
- September 28, 1909, for the Philadelphia Athletics

Last MLB appearance
- October 3, 1920, for the Cincinnati Reds

MLB statistics
- Batting average: .254
- Home runs: 4
- Runs batted in: 92
- Stats at Baseball Reference

Teams
- Philadelphia Athletics (1909–1910); Cleveland Naps (1910); Chicago White Sox (1912–1913); Cincinnati Reds (1919–1920)

Career highlights and awards
- World Series champion (1919)

Morris Charles Rath (December 25, 1887 – November 18, 1945) was an American professional baseball player. He played second base in Major League Baseball for the Philadelphia Athletics, Cleveland Naps, Chicago White Sox, and Cincinnati Reds. Rath was the batter hit by Eddie Cicotte in the 1919 World Series as Cicotte's signal to gamblers that the "fix was on" in that series. In an era before on-base percentage was a valued statistic, Rath was known for his ability to get on base by drawing bases on balls. His name was sometimes reported as Maurice Rath.

== Baseball career ==
Born in Mobeetie, Texas, Rath moved with his family to Philadelphia where he grew up. Rath attended Swarthmore College but did not play for the Garnet Tide, as the school had not yet established a baseball program, but he did pledge the Delta Upsilon fraternity during his tenure. He played on teams in the Philadelphia area and moved to professional baseball in 1908, playing in Wilmington, North Carolina, and Lynchburg, Virginia. After playing for the Reading Pretzels, Rath began his major league career as a bench player for the Philadelphia Athletics in 1909, appearing in seven games. He was traded in the middle of the 1910 season to the Cleveland Naps because the Athletics already had star second baseman Eddie Collins. He was sent to the Baltimore Orioles of the Eastern League before the end of the season.

In 1911, Rath was drafted by the Chicago White Sox. In 1912, he was the team's starting second baseman and had a breakthrough year, hitting .272 with 95 bases on balls and 30 stolen bases, in addition to outstanding defensive numbers. After a slow start in 1913, he was sent down to the Kansas City Blues of the American Association and remained in the minor leagues until 1917. In 1915, Rath led the International League with a .332 batting average while playing for the Toronto Maple Leafs. He then played for the Salt Lake City Bees in the Pacific Coast League in 1916 and 1917.

In 1918, Rath joined the U.S. Navy and missed the 1918 baseball season. The following year, he was back in the major leagues, given a chance to start by the Cincinnati Reds. In his comeback season he had a .264 batting average, drew 64 walks, and was the leadoff hitter for the pennant-winning Reds. He led all National League second basemen that year in assists, putouts, and double plays. In the 1919 World Series, Rath, batting leadoff, was hit with the second pitch of the series, which was later found out to be a signal used by White Sox pitcher Eddie Cicotte that the fix of the World Series was on. At almost the very end of his career, Rath became one of only two players in modern major league history to play in three games in one day, playing in all three games of modern baseball's lone tripleheader on October 2, 1920. (The other player to play in all three games was Cotton Tierney). Rath only played in one further ML game after the tripleheader; after a mediocre 1920 season, Rath was sent to the Seattle Rainiers in the Pacific Coast League and then to the San Francisco Seals, where he ended his playing career.

According to statistician Bill James, Rath's skills were generally unrecognized during his career. Before on-base percentage was considered an important statistic, there was little to distinguish him offensively. James wrote that Rath "was actually quite a good player... but he spent almost all of his career in the minor leagues, just because his skills were too subtle for the men who managed the major league teams."

== Personal life ==
Rath was the half-uncle of Mike Balenti, an opposing ballplayer in the American League, in that Balenti's mother was Rath's half-sister. There is no indication that either player was aware of this relationship during their lifetimes.

After his retirement from baseball, Rath ran a sporting goods store in Upper Darby Township, Pennsylvania. It was in that town that he died by suicide at age 57. He had reportedly been in poor health for a couple of years. He is buried at Arlington Cemetery in Drexel Hill, Pennsylvania.
