= Jimmy Ring =

American baseball player (1895–1965)

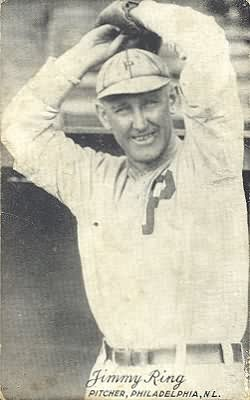
- Pitcher
- Born: February 15, 1895; Brooklyn, New York, U.S.
- Died: July 6, 1965 (aged 70); Breezy Point, New York, U.S.
- Batted: Right Threw: Right

MLB debut
- April 13, 1917, for the Cincinnati Reds

Last MLB appearance
- September 16, 1928, for the Philadelphia Phillies

MLB statistics
- Win–loss record: 118–149
- Earned run average: 4.13
- Strikeouts: 833
- Stats at Baseball Reference

Teams
- Cincinnati Reds (1917–1920); Philadelphia Phillies (1921–1925); New York Giants (1926); St. Louis Cardinals (1927); Philadelphia Phillies (1928)

Career highlights and awards
- World Series champion (1919)

James Joseph Ring (February 15, 1895 – July 6, 1965) was an American starting pitcher in Major League Baseball who played for the Cincinnati Reds (1917–1920), Philadelphia Phillies (1921–1925, 1928), New York Giants (1926) and St. Louis Cardinals (1927). Ring batted and threw right-handed.

Ring was used sparingly by the Cincinnati Reds from 1917 to 1918. He won 10 games in 1919, and beat Ed Cicotte and the Chicago White Sox in Game Four of the World Series on a three-hit, 2–0 shutout. He pitched again in Game Six, losing after allowing one run in five innings of relief. The next year he won 17 games, and was sent to the Philadelphia Phillies at the end of the season along with Greasy Neale in the same trade that brought Eppa Rixey to Cincinnati.

From 1921 to 1925 Ring averaged 12.8 wins per season, with a career-high 18 wins in 1923. Then, he was traded by the Phillies to the New York Giants before the 1927 season. After an 11–10 mark with the Giants, he was sent to the St. Louis Cardinals along with Frankie Frisch in exchange for Rogers Hornsby.

Ring failed to win a game for St. Louis in 1927. He appeared in 13 games and had a 0–4 record. In 1928, his last major league season, he returned to the Phillies and had a 4–17 mark in 35 appearances.

In a 12-season career, Ring posted a 118–149 record with 833 strikeouts and a 4.13 ERA in 2357.1 innings pitched.

Jimmy Ring died in Queens, New York, aged 70.
