= Joseph J. Sullivan =

American gambler (1870–1949)

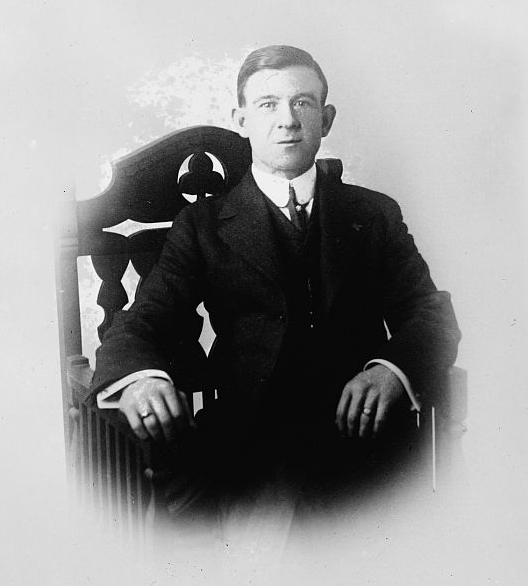
- Born: November 2, 1870; Boston, Massachusetts, U.S.
- Died: April 6, 1949 (aged 78); Sharon, Massachusetts, U.S.
- Other names: Sport Sullivan
- Occupation: Gambler
- Known for: Black Sox Scandal

Joseph J. "Sport" Sullivan (November 2, 1870 – April 6, 1949) was an American bookmaker and gambler from Boston who helped to initiate the 1919 Black Sox Scandal.

== Biography ==
Sullivan was a known gambler in the Boston area who reportedly bet heavily on the 1903 World Series and tried to bribe Boston pitcher Cy Young. He was arrested for gambling on baseball in 1907.

In 1919, Sullivan was living in the Boston suburb of Sharon, Massachusetts. In September 1919, Sullivan met with Chicago White Sox' first baseman Charles Arnold 'Chick' Gandil at Boston's Hotel Buckminster and conspired with Gandil to perpetrate a fix of the 1919 World Series. It has been disputed which of the two men initiated the meeting. Gandil had known Sullivan since 1912, and he later maintained that Sullivan approached him concerning the plot to throw the series. At Sullivan's suggestion, Gandil recruited several teammates to intentionally lose the games. Sullivan met with noted organized crime boss Arnold Rothstein, who agreed to bankroll the fix for $80,000. Rothstein provided an initial $40,000 for Sullivan to distribute to the involved players; however Sullivan kept $30,000 for his own wagering and gave only $10,000 to Gandil.

After the scheme had been exposed, Sullivan did not testify in front of the Chicago grand jury hearing in October 1920, because William J. Fallon, the lawyer of Arnold Rothstein, persuaded Sullivan not to do so. If Sullivan did testify, it would probably expose the fact that Rothstein had been the one providing the money for the Black Sox players to fix the Series. Still, he was later indicted on nine counts of conspiracy to defraud. Sullivan reportedly was paid by Rothstein to flee to Mexico so that he would not go to Chicago to testify in front of the Grand Jury. Sullivan was never arrested nor appeared at the trial, which started on June 27, 1921. The trial ended in an acquittal for all the defendants.

Sullivan appeared at Yankee Stadium during the 1926 World Series. He was recognized by Ban Johnson, who had police escort Sullivan out of the stadium. Sullivan died in Sharon, Massachusetts in 1949.

== Legacy ==
Sullivan's life was dramatized in Brendan Boyd's 1991 historical fiction Blue Ruin: A Novel of the 1919 World Series which retells the Black Sox Scandal through Sullivan's narration.

Sullivan was portrayed by Kevin Tighe in the 1988 film Eight Men Out.

He was also mentioned (despite not appearing as a character) in Season 1 Episode 8 of Boardwalk Empire Hold Me in Paradise and 11 of '' (Boardwalk Empire), Paris Green (Boardwalk Empire).
