= Storyville (nightclub) =

Boston jazz nightclub

Coordinates: 42.3482°N 71.0787°W

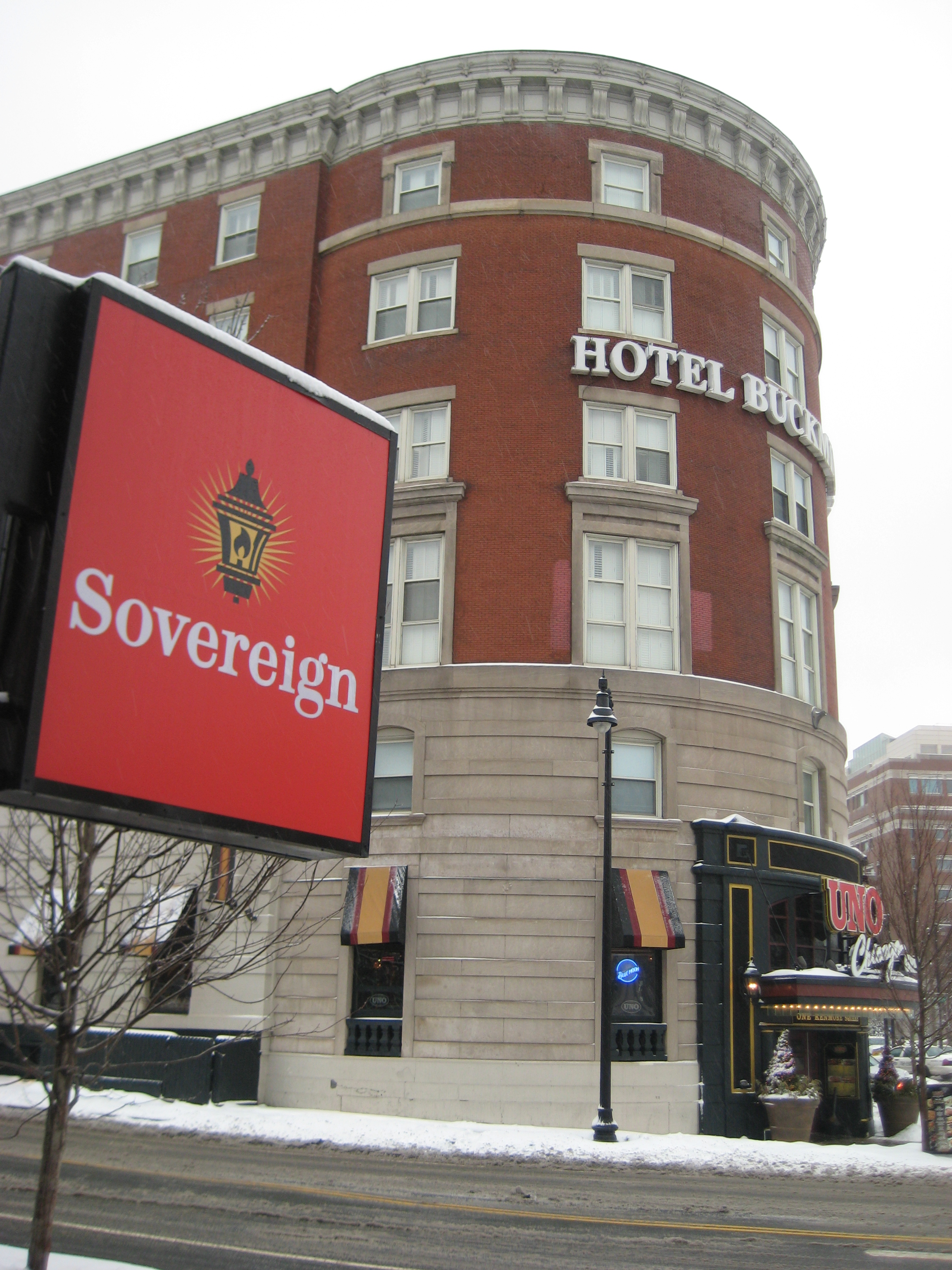
For much of its history, Storyville was located on the ground floor of Hotel Buckminster, Kenmore Square in the space shown here occupied by Pizzeria Uno.

Storyville was a Boston jazz nightclub organized by Boston jazz promoter and producer George Wein during the 1940s.

== WNAC at Hotel Buckminster ==
In 1929, WNAC Radio moved to new studios inside the hotel and remained for the next four decades. An FM station was added in the late 1930s. In June 1948, WNAC-TV began broadcasting from the hotel. Until 1968, WNAC operated AM, FM, and television stations in the hotel basement.

"Compared to the other clubs in town, listening to a jazz musician at Storyville is like sitting at home with a pair of earphones"
— Nat Hentoff, 1953 (WMEX Announcer, host of Storyville broadcasts

== Recordings ==
Many jazz legends made live radio broadcasts from the club, especially at the Hotel Buckminster, and many audio recordings from these sessions are still available.

- Dave Brubeck
- John Coltrane
- Ella Fitzgerald
- Stan Getz
- Billie Holiday
- Charles Mingus
- Gerry Mulligan Quartet
- Charlie Parker (de)(Provided to YouTube by Universal Music Group)
- Sarah Vaughan

== Performers ==
A number of notable jazz musicians performed in this venue, including:

- Louis Armstrong
- Duke Ellington
- William "Red" Garland
- Erroll Garner
- Jazz Messengers
- Pee Wee Russell
- Al Vega Trio

== Chronology ==
Originally a jazz club, it was named after the Storyville district of New Orleans. It was first located in the 1940s at the Copley Square Hotel, but soon relocated to Harvard Square.

In 1950 it was relocated again to the ground floor of the Hotel Buckminster in Kenmore Square.

In 1953, Storyville was relocated to the Copley Square Hotel, at street level.

In 1959, Storyville moved to the Bradford Hotel on Tremont Street for one year.

In the 1970s, Storyville was located in Kenmore Square near venues The Rathskeller, Where It’s At, Lucifer’s, and Psychedelic Supermarket.

In 1983 and 1984, at 645 Beacon Street, Storyville hosted performers such as the Del Fuegos, Bush Tetras, Til Tuesday, Barrence Whitfield & the Savages, and the Violent Femmes.

== Present-Day Locations ==
The space that housed Storyville at Hotel Buckminster in Kenmore Square is now occupied by a Pizzeria Uno restaurant.

In September 2011, at the Copley Square Hotel, a new nightclub opened, using the name Storyville.

== See also ==
- George Wein
- Storyville Records (George Wein's)
