= Pat Duncan (baseball) =

American baseball player (1893–1960)

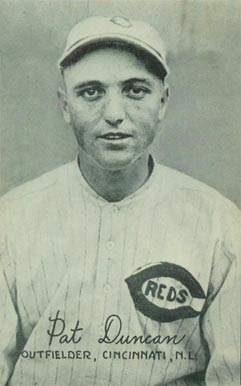
- Outfielder
- Born: October 6, 1893; Coalton, Ohio, U.S.
- Died: July 17, 1960 (aged 66); Jackson, Ohio, U.S.
- Batted: Right Threw: Right

MLB debut
- July 16, 1915, for the Pittsburgh Pirates

Last MLB appearance
- September 28, 1924, for the Cincinnati Reds

MLB statistics
- Batting average: .307
- Home runs: 23
- Runs batted in: 374
- Stats at Baseball Reference

Teams
- Pittsburgh Pirates (1915); Cincinnati Reds (1919–1924)

Career highlights and awards
- World Series champion (1919)

Louis Baird "Pat" Duncan (October 6, 1893 – July 17, 1960) was an American professional baseball outfielder. He played in Major League Baseball (MLB) from 1915 through 1924 for the Pittsburgh Pirates and Cincinnati Reds.

In 1921, the park (Crosley Field) was in its tenth season and no one had yet hit a ball over the fence without the benefit of a bounce. The first ball to clear the fence on the fly was hit in late May by John Beckwith of the Chicago Giants of the Negro National League. Then on June 2, with the last-place Reds playing the St. Louis Cardinals, Duncan dug in against left-handed hurler Ferdie Schupp with a runner on second and one out. Duncan connected. The ball rocketed toward left field, easily cleared the wall, and Duncan had registered Organized Baseball’s first home run to go out of the park in Redland Field. It cleared the 12-foot concrete wall by four to six feet, and it traveled an estimated 400 feet.

In 727 games played, Duncan batted .307 (827-2695) with 23 home runs, 361 runs, and 374 RBI. His best year was 1922 when he hit .328 with 8 home runs and 94 RBI. In the 1919 World Series he hit .269 (7-26) and leading all regulars with 8 RBI.
