= Kid Gleason =

American baseball player and manager (1866–1933)

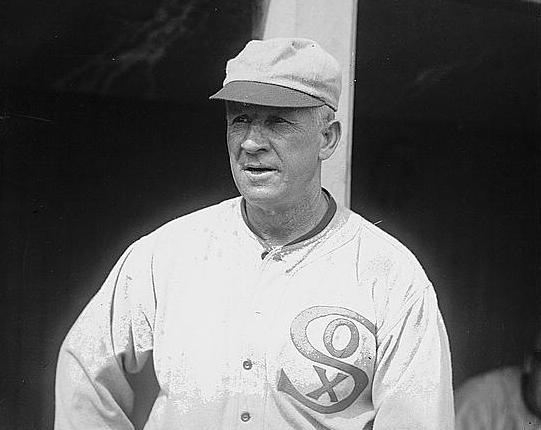
- Gleason in 1919
- Second baseman / Pitcher / Manager
- Born: October 26, 1866; Camden, New Jersey, U.S.
- Died: January 2, 1933 (aged 66); Philadelphia, Pennsylvania, U.S.
- Batted: Both Threw: Right

MLB debut
- April 20, 1888, for the Philadelphia Quakers

Last MLB appearance
- August 27, 1912, for the Chicago White Sox

MLB statistics
- Batting average: .261
- Home runs: 15
- Runs batted in: 824
- Win–loss record: 138–131
- Earned run average: 3.79
- Strikeouts: 744
- Stats at Baseball Reference
- Managerial record at Baseball Reference

Teams
- As player: Philadelphia Quakers / Phillies (1888–1891); St. Louis Browns (1892–1894); Baltimore Orioles (1894–1895); New York Giants (1896–1900); Detroit Tigers (1901–1902); Philadelphia Phillies (1903–1908); Chicago White Sox (1912); As manager: Chicago White Sox (1919–1923); As coach: Philadelphia Phillies (1908–1911); Chicago White Sox (1912–1914, 1916–1917); Philadelphia Athletics (1924–1931)

William Jethro "Kid" Gleason (October 26, 1866 – January 2, 1933) was an American Major League Baseball (MLB) player and manager. Gleason managed the Chicago White Sox from 1919 through 1923. His first season as a big league manager was notable for his team's appearance in the World Series and the ensuing Black Sox Scandal, although Gleason does not appear to have been involved in the scandal. After leaving the White Sox, Gleason was on the coaching staff for the Philadelphia Athletics, until 1931.

== Early life ==
Gleason was born in Camden, New Jersey. He acquired the nickname "Kid" early in life, not only because of his short stature (growing to only 5-foot-7, 155 pounds) but also because of his quite energetic, youthful nature. His family later moved to the Pocono Mountains in northeast Pennsylvania, where his father worked as a coal miner.

== Playing career ==
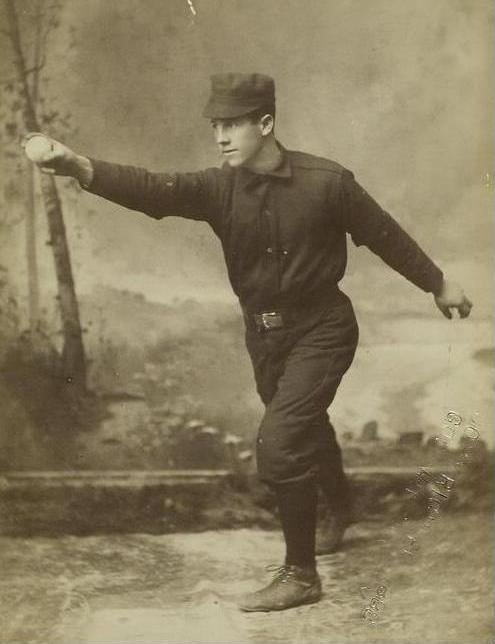
Gleason in 1888

Gleason played two seasons in the minor leagues of northern Pennsylvania. In 1886, with Williamsport of the Pennsylvania State League, he batted .355 and stole 20 bases in 36 games. Gleason debuted as a pitcher with the Philadelphia Quakers on April 20, 1888, after impressing Hall of Fame manager Harry Wright during an exhibition game against the University of Pennsylvania. After enjoying mixed success as a pitcher in 1888 and 1889, Gleason opted to stay in the National League under Wright instead of moving to the Players' League set up in 1890. His 1890 season was his best as a pitcher, with 38 wins, a 2.63 ERA, 54 complete games, and 506 innings pitched.

Gleason was sold to the St. Louis Browns for the 1892 season, where he played for two and a half seasons as a starting pitcher and reserve fielder. With St. Louis, he made appearances as an outfielder, first baseman, second baseman, and shortstop, and hit .235.

After being shipped to the Baltimore Orioles partway through the 1894 season, Gleason pitched effectively in 20 starts and also batted .349, helping Baltimore to a National League pennant. Early in the 1895 season, manager Ned Hanlon moved Gleason to second base full time, where he hit well but fielded poorly that year. Baltimore repeated as NL champions, but Hanlon traded Gleason in the offseason to the New York Giants.

In New York, Gleason played five seasons as the regular second baseman, hitting a respectable .271 overall but with little power. He served as a team captain, and in that capacity may have invented the intentional walk during an 1897 game by advising his pitcher to walk a strong hitter to face a weaker one. Gleason also earned local fame on April 26, 1900, for helping New York firemen rescue residents from an apartment fire.

Gleason joined the new American League in 1901, starting at second base for two years with the Detroit Tigers. From 1903 to 1908, he returned to Philadelphia and hit .250 over the period; he led the NL in sacrifice bunts in 1904 and 1905.

Gleason compiled a .261 career batting average. He retired as a player after the 1908 season at the age of 42, having appeared as a player in just two games for the Phillies that year. However, four years later, Gleason would make an unlikely return to the big leagues as a player, with his two at-bats in one game at second base for the White Sox in 1912 making Gleason one of only 29 MLB players to have played in four different decades.

Gleason led the league in putouts and assists three times each, though he also led in errors four times. He ranks seventh all-time in errors as a second baseman.

== Coaching career ==
Gleason began his coaching career in 1908 with the Phillies as a player-coach. The Phillies unconditionally released Gleason on April 12, 1910, prior to Opening Day. At the time, the Philadelphia Inquirer called Gleason "one of the most popular players who ever donned a Philadelphia uniform."

After sitting out 1910 and 1911, Gleason joined the Chicago White Sox in 1912, where he made one appearance as a player and became a coach under manager Jimmy Callahan.

Gleason became manager of the White Sox on December 31, 1918, following the dismissal of Pants Rowland. In his first season, the team won the pennant but lost the World Series to the Cincinnati Reds, resulting in allegations the White Sox had been paid by gamblers to "throw" the Series. The ensuing scandal resulted in lifetime bans from baseball for eight White Sox players. Gleason, however, was not involved in the gambling, and some sources noted he was among those who alerted White Sox owner Charles Comiskey of the fix. Although he felt betrayed and disappointed by his 1919 team, he continued to manage the White Sox through the 1923 season.

After leaving in 1923, Gleason went on in 1926 to coach under manager Connie Mack with the Philadelphia Athletics until retiring after the 1931 season. As a coach, Gleason won two World Series championships with the Athletics, in 1929 and 1930.

== Death ==
Gleason died due to a heart ailment in 1933, at the age of 66, in Philadelphia. His funeral was attended by an estimated 5,000 people, including baseball luminaries such as Commissioner Kenesaw Mountain Landis and Hall of Fame manager John McGraw. He is buried in Philadelphia's Northwood Cemetery.

== In popular culture ==
Gleason has been referenced in pop culture in several books, and is a prominent supporting character in Ring Lardner's 1916 novel You Know Me Al. He is portrayed by actor John Mahoney in the 1988 film Eight Men Out, based on Eliot Asinof's book of the same name.

== Managerial record ==
Team	Year	Regular season					Postseason			
Team	Year	Games	Won	Lost	Win %	Finish	Won	Lost	Win %	Result
CWS	1919	140	88	52	.629	1st in AL	3	5	.375	Lost World Series (CIN)
CWS	1920	154	96	58	.623	2nd in AL	–	–	–	–
CWS	1921	154	62	92	.403	7th in AL	–	–	–	–
CWS	1922	154	77	77	.500	5th in AL	–	–	–	–
CWS	1923	154	69	85	.448	7th in AL	–	–	–	–
Total		756	392	364	.519		3	5	.375	

== See also ==
- List of Major League Baseball career runs scored leaders
- List of Major League Baseball career stolen bases leaders
- List of Major League Baseball annual saves leaders
