= Joe Gedeon =

American baseball player (1893–1941)

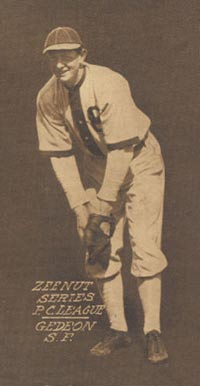
- Second baseman
- Born: December 5, 1893; Sacramento, California, U.S.
- Died: May 19, 1941 (aged 47); San Francisco, California, U.S.
- Batted: Right Threw: Right

MLB debut
- May 13, 1913, for the Washington Senators

Last MLB appearance
- October 3, 1920, for the St. Louis Browns

MLB statistics
- Batting average: .244
- Home runs: 1
- Runs batted in: 171
- Stats at Baseball Reference

Teams
- Washington Senators (1913–1914); New York Yankees (1916–1917); St. Louis Browns (1918–1920)

Elmer Joseph Gedeon (December 5, 1893 – May 19, 1941) was an American second baseman in Major League Baseball. He played for the Washington Senators, New York Yankees, and St. Louis Browns.

== Biography ==
Born in Sacramento, California, Gedeon started his professional baseball career in 1912 in the Pacific Coast League. He won a job with the Senators the following season. Gedeon hit poorly in limited action and went back to the PCL in 1914. In 1915, he had the best offensive season of his career with the Salt Lake City Bees, batting .317 and slugging .514 in 190 games.

For most of the next five seasons, Gedeon was a regular with the Yankees and Browns. He was an above-average defensive player, leading all American League second basemen in assists once (1918) and fielding percentage twice (1918 and 1919). In 1920, he led the AL in sacrifice hits with 48; this total is still a Browns/Orioles single season record.

Gedeon – who was a friend of Black Sox conspirator Swede Risberg – was present during a meeting with gamblers, as they were discussing the plot to fix the 1919 World Series. He was later called as a witness in the trial. On November 3, 1921, Gedeon was banned for life from organized baseball for "having guilty knowledge" of the Black Sox Scandal.

Gedeon spent three months (February–May 1941) at San Francisco Hospital with a liver ailment. He died May 19, 1941 of the ailment, at age 47. The official cause of death was bronchial pneumonia. His nephew, Elmer Gedeon, was one of only two Major League Baseball players to be killed in World War II, dying in 1944.

Gedeon was reinstated by Commissioner Rob Manfred on May 13, 2025 along with other deceased players who were on the ineligible list.

== See also ==
- List of people banned from Major League Baseball
