= Joel Puckett =

American composer

- Born: 1977 (age 48–49); Atlanta, GA
- Genres: Contemporary classical
- Occupation: Composer
- Years active: 1995-present
- Labels: Naxos Records, Albany Records
- Website: www.joelpuckett.com

Joel Puckett (born in 1977 in Atlanta, Georgia) is an American composer. Joel completed his academic work at the University of Michigan, earning both a Masters of Music and a Doctorate of Musical Arts. His teachers include Michael Daugherty, William Bolcom, Bright Sheng, Will Averitt, and Thomas Albert.

The September 11th tribute This Mourning—one of his most notable works—was commissioned by the Washington Chorus and is scored for 250 singers, full orchestra and a consort of 40 crystal glasses. This premiere took place at the main stage of the Kennedy Center in Washington D.C. in late November 2006. Among his other notable pieces is his concerto for flute, flute choir, and wind ensemble The Shadow of Sirius, which was written to commemorate the loss of his child through miscarriage.

Puckett is a Professor of Music Theory and Composition and serves as Chair of Music Theory, Ear Training and Piano Skills at the Peabody Conservatory of Johns Hopkins University. Previously he taught at Shenandoah University and Towson University. Puckett also served a term as the composer-in-residence for the Chicago Youth Symphony Orchestras.

His first opera, The Fix, was premiered by Minnesota Opera in March 2019. It received wildly mixed reviews ranging from raves, such as from Parterre Box, to pans, such as in the Wall Street Journal.
