= Hugh Fullerton =

American sportswriter (1873–1945)

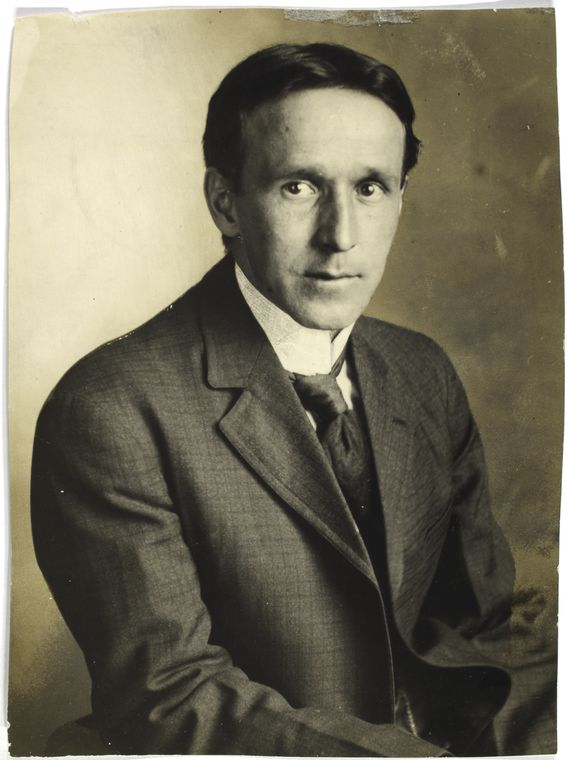
- Born: Hugh Stuart Fullerton III; September 10, 1873; Hillsboro, Ohio
- Died: December 27, 1945 (aged 72); Dunedin, Florida
- Education: Ohio State University
- Occupation: Sportswriter
- Spouse: Alice Miller
- Children: 2
- Writing career
- Notable awards: J. G. Taylor Spink Award (1964)

Hugh Stuart Fullerton III (10 September 1873 – 27 December 1945) was an American sportswriter in the first half of the 20th century. He was one of the founders of the Baseball Writers' Association of America. He is best remembered for his role in uncovering the 1919 "Black Sox" Scandal. Studs Terkel played Fullerton in the 1988 film Eight Men Out.

== Biography ==
Fullerton was born in Ohio and attended the Ohio State University. Fullerton reportedly never graduated from Ohio State. He was kicked out for unknown reasons (he never explained to his family). He was later honored by the university for his writing. After starting his journalism career in Cincinnati, he moved to Chicago to continue his work. Fullerton wrote in a colorful style, incorporating slang and human interest elements into his sports writing. In fact, he is credited as the first writer to include quotes from players in sports coverage. Among his protégés were Ring Lardner and Grantland Rice.

Fullerton, however, also had a detailed knowledge of baseball and used baseball statistics to make predictions. He gained attention by predicting that the weak-hitting Chicago White Sox would upset the crosstown-rival Chicago Cubs in the 1906 World Series; Fullerton correctly predicted that the White Sox would win Games 1 and 3, that the Cubs would win Game 2, and that it would rain on the fourth day. The Cubs had won 116 games that season and were favored to win; the White Sox had batted an anemic .230 with only seven home runs. The White Sox won the Series, four games to two.

Fullerton subsequently used the data he collected to correctly predict the winners of the 1912, 1915, 1916, and 1917 World Series.

=== Black Sox Scandal ===
Fullerton's reputation made him a prominent voice in exposing the Black Sox Scandal. Prior to the 1919 World Series between the White Sox and the Cincinnati Reds, Fullerton received a tip from professional gamblers that Cincinnati was a lock to win. The scene immortalized in the 1988 film Eight Men Out indicated that Fullerton (portrayed by Studs Terkel) watched the series with Ring Lardner (played by director John Sayles) and together they counted suspicious plays. In actuality, Fullerton did this with former pitching great Christy Mathewson. Fullerton's article for The Evening World, headlined "Is Big League Baseball Being Run for Gamblers, with Players in the Deal?", forced the baseball establishment to investigate the charges. One year later, the eight White Sox ballplayers who participated in, or knew of, the plot to throw the series were banned from the game for life.

=== Personal life ===
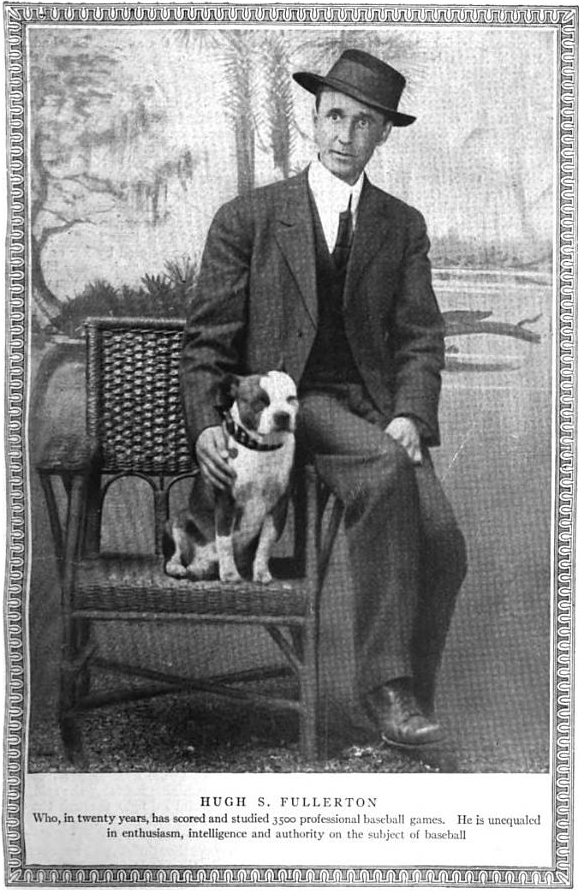
Fullerton with dog, 1912

Fullerton also wrote stories about his hometown of Hillsboro, Ohio. He died on December 27, 1945, in Dunedin, Florida. Fullerton was posthumously awarded the J. G. Taylor Spink Award by the Baseball Hall of Fame in 1964.

Hugh Fullerton IV (also known as Hugh Fullerton Jr., 1904–1965) was a reporter and columnist for the Associated Press. Hugh Fullerton V was a newspaper owner in Ohio and Michigan, and later taught journalism.

== Sources ==
- The Black Sox Scandal: An Account, 2010
- Hugh S. Fullerton Vividly Describes the Full Details of Great Baseball Scandal, The Atlanta Constitution, October 3, 1920
- Baseball On Trial: The Black Sox and the Thrown World Series, The New Republic, October 20, 1920
- Hugh S. Fullerton, the Black Sox Scandal, and the Ethical Impulse in Sports Writing
- Uncovering the Fix of the 1919 World Series: The Role of Hugh Fullerton, NINE: A Journal of Baseball History and Culture, Fall 2004
