= Chick Gandil =

American baseball player (1888–1970)

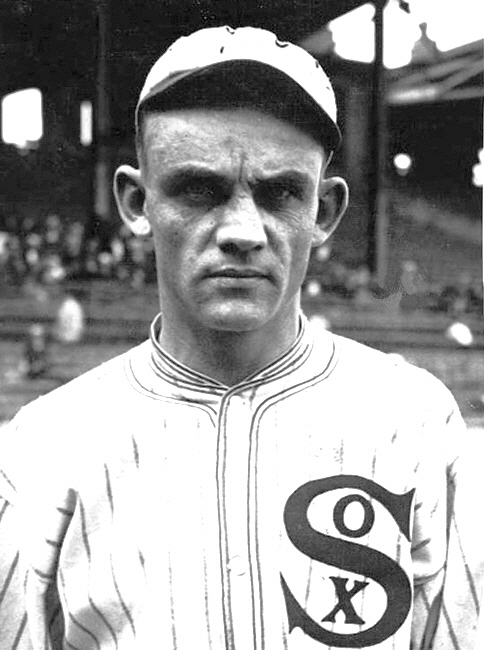
- Gandil c. 1917
- First baseman
- Born: January 19, 1888; St. Paul, Minnesota, U.S.
- Died: December 13, 1970 (aged 82); Calistoga, California, U.S.
- Batted: Right Threw: Right

MLB debut
- April 14, 1910, for the Chicago White Sox

Last MLB appearance
- September 28, 1919, for the Chicago White Sox

MLB statistics
- Batting average: .277
- Home runs: 11
- Runs batted in: 556
- Stats at Baseball Reference

Teams
- Chicago White Sox (1910); Washington Senators (1912–1915); Cleveland Indians (1916); Chicago White Sox (1917–1919)

Career highlights and awards
- World Series champion (1917)

Charles Arnold "Chick" Gandil (January 19, 1888 – December 13, 1970) was an American professional baseball player. He played for the Washington Senators, Cleveland Indians, and Chicago White Sox of the American League. He is best known as the ringleader of the players involved in the 1919 Black Sox scandal. Described by his contemporaries as a "professional malcontent", he was physically well-built at 6 ft 2 in (1.88 m) and 195 lb (88 kg), and had a stern and challenging demeanor. He used both to display his toughness, and also did not hesitate to use sheer strength to get his point across.

== Early years ==
He was born in St. Paul, Minnesota, to Swiss immigrants Louise Bechel and Christian Gandil. He was their only child. The Gandil family migrated west and the 1900 census (taken June 8) has their address registered as Seattle, King County, Washington. After 1900, the Gandils moved to California, settling in Berkeley. The young Gandil soon showed an interest in playing baseball. He joined the Oakland High School baseball team in 1902 and played all positions except first base.

After two years at Oakland High School, Gandil left home to make it on his own. He took a train to Amarillo, Texas, and played catcher in the local semi-pro baseball league for the Amarillo team. In 1907, he migrated to Humboldt, Arizona, and worked as a boilermaker in the copper mines. He played catcher for the semipro team that was sponsored by the local smelting company. The Humboldt baseball club experienced financial problems in 1906, and Gandil moved on to a team in Cananea, Mexico, 40 mi (64 km) from the United States. "I caught on with an outlaw team in Cananea, Mexico, just across the Arizona border. Cananea was a wide-open mining town in those days, which suited me fine. I was a wild, rough kid. I did a little heavyweight fighting at $150 a fight. I also worked part-time as a boilermaker in the copper mines." It was with the Cananea, Mexico, team that Gandil became a first baseman.

== Professional baseball career ==
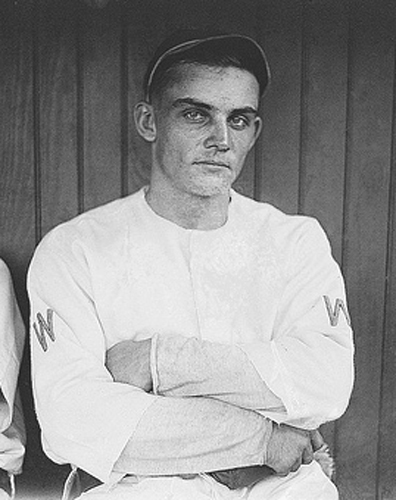
Gandil in a 1913 Bain News Service photo, while he was with the Washington Senators.

Gandil entered professional baseball in 1908. He spent the season with Shreveport (Louisiana) in the Texas League and batted a solid .269. That same year, he met 17-year-old Laurel Fay Kelly (a Mississippi native), and they were soon married.

After the 1908 season, Gandil was drafted by the St. Louis Browns. Failing to make the club in the spring of 1909, the Browns ordered him back to Shreveport. Gandil refused to report, though. He headed back west with his new bride and joined the Fresno team in the outlaw California State League. For this offense, Gandil faced blacklisting by organized baseball. He reconsidered his decision and joined Sacramento of the Pacific Coast League for the remainder of 1909 season. He was arrested, however, for having stolen $225 from the Fresno team coffers.

Gandil was successful in Sacramento. He batted .282, and late in the 1909 season, was sold to the Chicago White Sox. He was not required to report to Chicago until the following season.

Gandil made his major league debut on April 14, 1910, with the White Sox, which was a disaster. He appeared in just 77 games and batted just .193. It was reported that he had trouble hitting the curveball. He was sold to Montreal in 1911 and spent the season in the Eastern League. He had a solid season (batting .304), and several major league clubs wanted to draft him. The rules at the time stated that only one player could be drafted from each team, so Gandil returned to Montreal to begin the 1912 season. He hit over .300 in the first 29 games and was sold to the Washington Senators. He was now better prepared to play major league baseball, and in 117 games, he batted .305 and was the American League leader for first basemen in fielding percentage.

From 1912 to 1915, Gandil led the Senators in runs batted in three times and batted .293. In the field, he paced American League first basemen in fielding percentage four times and assists three times. Gandil remained with the Senators through the 1915 season and played the 1916 season for the Cleveland Indians.

Early on in his major league career, Gandil was considered a top-notch first baseman, both for his play on the field and his solid work ethic. In 1916, a Cleveland newspaper described Gandil as "a most likeable player, and one of excellent habits." During Gandil's first season with the Senators he met bookie and gambler, Joseph "Sport" Sullivan. Sullivan later become a key figure in conspiring with Gandil to fix the 1919 World Series.

On February 25, 1917, he was reacquired by the White Sox for $3,500. That season, Chicago defeated the New York Giants in the World Series. It was later revealed that Gandil and his teammate, Charles "Swede" Risberg, had allegedly collected $45 from each member of the White Sox and paid off the Detroit Tigers in two crucial doubleheaders late in the season. When Tigers pitcher Bill James agreed that his team would go easy, the Tigers lost all four games, allowing the White Sox to win the American League pennant. This incident was officially investigated by Commissioner Landis in 1927, but due to contradictions, no action was taken.

== Black Sox scandal ==
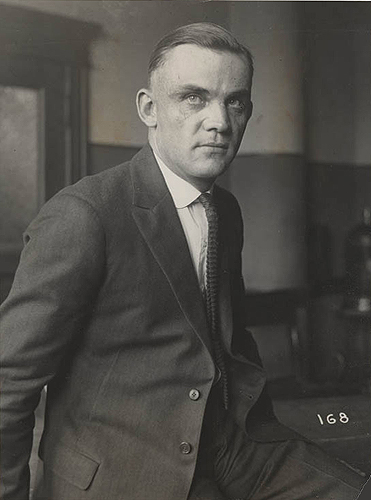
Gandil in a photograph taken at the trial of the eight Chicago White Sox players who were accused of fixing the 1919 World Series.

Gandil claims that Sullivan approached him with the idea to fix the 1919 World Series.

I had only social contacts with gamblers until that September day in 1919 when Sullivan walked up to Eddie Cicotte and me as we left our hotel in Boston. As I recall, we were four games in front the final week of the season, and it looked pretty certain that the pennant was ours. I was kind of surprised when Sullivan suggested that we get a "syndicate" together of seven or eight players to throw the Series to Cincinnati. As I say, I never figured the guy as a fixer but just one who played for the percentages. The idea of taking seven or eight people in on the plot scared me. I said to Sullivan it wouldn’t work. He answered, 'Don’t be silly. It's been pulled before and it can be again.' He had a persuasive manner which he backed up with a lot of cash. He said he was willing to pay $10,000 each to all the players we brought in on the deal. Considering our skimpy salaries, $10,000 was quite a chunk, and he knew it."

Sullivan assured Gandil that the fix was on, and that $100,000 (equivalent to $1.86 million in 2025) in total would be paid to the players. In addition to serving as the contact for the gamblers, Gandil was responsible for recruiting and paying the players involved in the fix. Gandil received $35,000 (equivalent to $0.65 million in 2025) for his role in throwing the World Series – nearly nine times his 1919 salary of $4,000.

In the spring of 1920, Gandil demanded that the White Sox raise his salary to $6,500 per year. Owner Charles Comiskey would not relent, and he decided to remain in California. Gandil retired from the majors. According to Gandil, "Instead, I played semipro ball twice a week for the Elks Club in Bakersfield, Calif. I earned $75 a game." He was far from Chicago as investigations into the 1919 World Series began during the fall of 1920.

Gandil and his seven White Sox teammates were indicted, and he came back to Chicago in July 1921 to stand trial for fixing the series. The jury found the eight players not guilty. Following the players' acquittal, Gandil said, "I guess that'll learn Ban Johnson he can't frame an honest bunch of ball players." However, the players' joy was short lived. Gandil and the others were permanently banned from organized baseball by new commissioner Kenesaw Mountain Landis. Gandil was reinstated on May 13, 2025.

== Career statistics ==
In 1,147 games over nine seasons, Gandil posted a .277 batting average (1176-for-4245) with 449 runs, 173 doubles, 78 triples, 11 home runs, 556 RBI, 151 stolen bases, 273 bases on balls, .327 on-base percentage and .362 slugging percentage. He finished his career with a .992 fielding percentage as a first baseman. In the 1917 and 1919 World Series, he batted .245 (13-for-53) with 10 RBI and 2 stolen bases.

== After the scandal and later years ==
After 1921, he continued to play semi-pro ball on the west coast. He contacted Joe Gedeon, Swede Risberg, Joe Jackson and Fred McMullin and attempted to put together a team in Southern California. In 1925, he played with Hal Chase and other banished players in the Frontier League in Douglas, Arizona. While presiding over the Douglas team in 1927, he reportedly had team manager Buck Weaver banned from the league. It was believed that Gandil did this because he had felt betrayed by his former White Sox teammate's lack of support during the 1921 investigation of the 1917 White Sox/Tigers situation. He ended his playing career with semi-pro clubs in the copper mining towns of Bayard and Hurley, New Mexico.

After he ended his baseball career, Gandil settled in his childhood residence (Berkeley, California) with Laurel and his daughter Idella. His primary occupation was as a plumber. His mother and father still lived in Berkeley (his father Christian died in 1941 and his mother Louise in 1952). There is no official record of contact between them. He remained in the area until he retired to Calistoga in 1954 and spent the last part of his life in the Napa Valley region of Northern California. Gandil died at age 82 on December 13, 1970, in a convalescent hospital. He had been suffering from heart disease and emphysema, and the official cause of death was heart failure. His death was only immediately reported by The Press Democrat and his obituary didn't mention his involvement in baseball and it wasn't publicly announced that he had died worldwide until February 25, 1971.

Laurel, who had been married to Gandil for 62 years, followed him in death just three months later. Gandil is interred at St. Helena Public Cemetery.

Gandil was portrayed by Michael Rooker in the 1988 film Eight Men Out and by Art LaFleur in 1989's Field of Dreams.

Gandil was reinstated by Commissioner Rob Manfred on May 13, 2025 along with other deceased players who were on the ineligible list.

== 1956 Sports Illustrated article ==
In 1956, Gandil told his version of the events of the 1919 World Series to sportswriter Melvin Durslag. Durslag's account of Gandil's story was published in the September 17, 1956 edition of Sports Illustrated.

In the story, Gandil admitted to leading the plot to throw the Series and expressed guilt and remorse over having done so. However, he claimed that after an initial payment was made, the players actually abandoned the plan and had ultimately tried their best to win. According to Gandil's story, the rumors which had spread about the Series being fixed (triggered by a sudden influx of money being bet on the Reds) caused the players to conclude that they could never get away with throwing the Series, as their every move would be closely scrutinized. Instead, they decided to betray the gamblers and keep the cash. While he believed that Landis' decision to ban them all was draconian, he felt they deserved to be banned just for talking to the gamblers.

In his account, Gandil suggested that the players were under intense pressure from both observers suspicious of their every move and the gamblers expecting them to go along with the plan. He said this may have contributed to their making poor plays despite their decision to abandon the fix. However, he was firm in his insistence that all of the players were trying their best throughout all eight games of the Series. Gandil also said that the original deal called for the conspirators to play the first game straight, since a White Sox win would drive the price up further; the White Sox were shelled in that game 9-1. Gandil further claimed in his story that he never received his share of any of the money paid by the gamblers, and that he had no idea what happened to that money.

...I never did get any part of Rothstein's $10,000 and I don't know who did. Since Rothstein probably won his bets anyway, he never gave us any trouble. Naturally, I would have liked to have had my share of that ten grand, but with all the excitement at the Series' end and with Comiskey's investigation, I was frankly frightened stiff. Besides, I had the crazy notion that my not touching any of that money would exonerate me from my guilt in the conspiracy. I give you my solemn word I don't know to this day what happened to the cash. During the next two months, after returning to my winter home in Los Angeles, I heard some wild reports about the killing I made on the World Series. One account said I was flashing around a bankbook with a $25,000 entry. Another said I had been paid off in diamonds. And still another had me plunking down cash for a house. The truth was, I did buy a house—with $2,500 I had borrowed from the bank for down payment. The loan was repaid when I finally got my World Series check from the White Sox."

In an interview with Dwight Chapin, published in the Los Angeles Times on August 14, 1969, Gandil again denied that he threw the Series stating, "I'm going to my grave with a clear conscience."
