= Fred McMullin =

American baseball player (1891–1952)

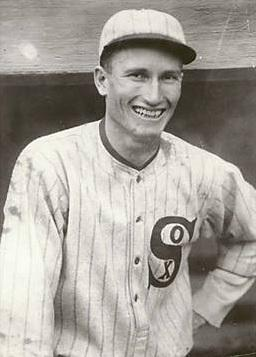
- McMullin in 1919
- Third baseman
- Born: October 13, 1891; Scammon, Kansas, U.S.
- Died: November 20, 1952 (aged 61); Los Angeles, California, U.S.
- Batted: Right Threw: Right

MLB debut
- August 27, 1914, for the Detroit Tigers

Last MLB appearance
- September 20, 1920, for the Chicago White Sox

MLB statistics
- Batting average: .256
- Home runs: 1
- Runs batted in: 70
- Stats at Baseball Reference

Teams
- Detroit Tigers (1914); Chicago White Sox (1916–1920)

Career highlights and awards
- World Series champion (1917)

Fred Drury McMullin (October 13, 1891 – November 20, 1952) was an American Major League Baseball third baseman. He is best known for his involvement in the 1919 Black Sox scandal.

== Early life ==
Fred McMullin was born to Robert and Minnie McMullin, the first of nine children. The family grew so big that eventually they migrated to Southern California, where Fred attended Los Angeles High School. McMullin played for the school's baseball team, which boasted another future major leaguer ball player in Johnny Rawlings.

== Career ==
McMullin got his first taste of playing pro ball when he signed a contract to play for the Long Beach Sand Crabs of the short lived Trolly League. The teams were often short on funds and many times, players weren't paid. The league folded after a few months. After that McMullin bounced around from minor league to minor league until he signed with the Seattle Giants of the Northwestern League, which was at the time considered a launching point for future major league players. McMullin played for Seattle until his contract was sold to the Tacoma Tigers. His career began to blossom in Tacoma under the guidance of ex big league pitcher Joe McGinnity. McMullin replaced team captain Bill Yohe when Yohle was released to give McMullin more playing time. He began his major league career on August 27, 1914, as a shortstop for the Detroit Tigers. He spent most of 1912–1915 in the minors before making the Chicago White Sox team in 1916. In 1917, he won the World Series with Chicago, while batting .125 in six games against the New York Giants.

McMullin was only a utility infielder for the 1919 AL Champion White Sox, and as such he didn't play enough to have much potential for throwing games (he recorded just two plate appearances in the eight-game series). However, he became a part of the conspiracy when he overheard several other players' conversations and threatened to report them unless included.

McMullin was also Chicago's advance scout for the World Series, which may explain how and why he earned an equal share in the winnings ($5,000) from the fix. It is entirely probable that, as a means to cover himself and his co-conspirators, McMullin delivered a flawed scouting report to all the "clean" Sox about what to expect from Cincinnati's pitchers. A look at the statistics shows little disparity between Black Sox and Clean Sox; for example, ringleader Chick Gandil batted .233 to future Hall of Famer Eddie Collins' .226.

For his role in the fix, McMullin was banned for life from organized baseball, along with seven other players, by Commissioner Kenesaw Mountain Landis.

== Later years and death ==
McMullin never spoke publicly about his involvement in the Black Sox scandal. He went on to hold a variety of jobs throughout his life such as a carpenter, office jobs, traffic manager and Los Angeles County deputy marshal. McMullin became the deputy marshal in 1940. One of these duties involved serving as a bailiff, and the other was serving eviction notices. One of these was on a blind woman, for whom McMullin delayed service of the eviction notice when he noticed that she was struggling to pack up the belongings of her children. McMullin’s final years were plagued by ill health caused by arteriosclerosis. On November 19, 1952, just over a month after his 61st birthday, he had a fatal stroke. McMullin was buried at Inglewood Park Cemetery.

== In popular culture ==
In the 1988 film Eight Men Out, McMullin was portrayed by Perry Lang.
