= 1919 World Series =

1919 Major League Baseball championship series

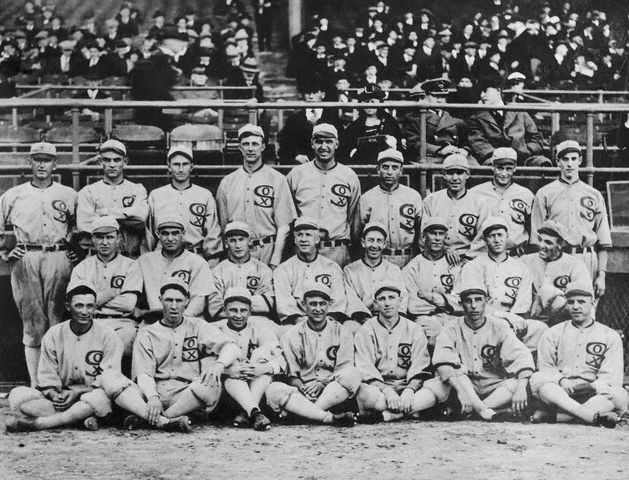
- 1919 Chicago White Sox team photo
| Team (Wins) | Managers | Season |
|---|---|---|
| Cincinnati Reds (5) | Pat Moran | 96–44, .686, GA: 9 |
| Chicago White Sox (3) | Kid Gleason | 88–52, .629, GA: 3 1/2 |
- Dates: October 1–9
- Venue(s): Redland Field (Cincinnati); Comiskey Park (Chicago)
- Umpires: Cy Rigler (NL), Billy Evans (AL); Ernie Quigley (NL), Dick Nallin (AL)
- Hall of Famers: Umpire: Billy Evans; Reds: Edd Roush; White Sox: Eddie Collins; Red Faber (DNP); Ray Schalk

World Series program
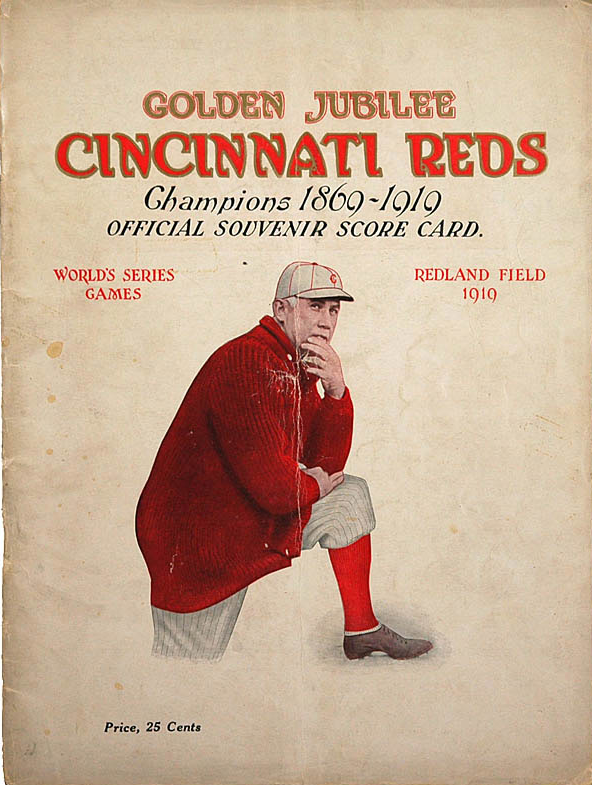

The 1919 World Series was the championship series in Major League Baseball (MLB) for the 1919 season. The 16th edition of the World Series, it matched the American League (AL) champion Chicago White Sox against the National League (NL) champion Cincinnati Reds. Although most World Series have been of the best-of-seven format, the 1919 World Series was a best-of-nine series (along with 1903, 1920, and 1921). The National Baseball Commission decided to try the best-of-nine format partly to increase popularity of the sport and partly to generate more revenue.

The events of the 1919 World Series are often associated with the Black Sox Scandal, in which several members of the Chicago franchise conspired with gamblers, allegedly led by organized crime figure Arnold Rothstein, to throw the series. This led the various franchise owners to install Kenesaw Mountain Landis as the first Commissioner of Baseball in 1920.

In August 1921, despite being acquitted from criminal charges, eight players from the White Sox were banned from organized baseball for either fixing the series or having knowledge about the fix without alerting the league. Dickey Kerr, another player on the team who was not involved in the scandal, was later suspended after holding out for more pay, but was eventually reinstated. They were the first players formally banned in the modern era, and, as it turned out, the template for how Landis would wield his authority throughout his tenure. On May 12, 2025, commissioner Rob Manfred lifted all permanent bans — including those of the Black Sox players — on the grounds that deceased players pose no threat to the integrity of the game. The nine players that were once banned by the MLB (most notably Shoeless Joe Jackson and Eddie Cicotte) are now considered eligible for entry into the Baseball Hall of Fame by as early as 2027.

== Teams ==
=== Chicago White Sox ===
In 1919, the Chicago White Sox, who had won the World Series two years earlier, had the best record in the American League (AL). Most of the same players had defeated the New York Giants in the 1917 series, four games to two. They had fallen to sixth place in the American League in 1918, largely as a result of losing their best player, Shoeless Joe Jackson, and a few other teammates to World War I service. The team's owner, Charles Comiskey, fired manager Pants Rowland after the season and replaced him with William "Kid" Gleason, who had played over twenty years in the majors but had never managed before. The 88–52 White Sox won the American League pennant again in 1919, by 3 1/2 games over the Cleveland Indians (world champions the following year).

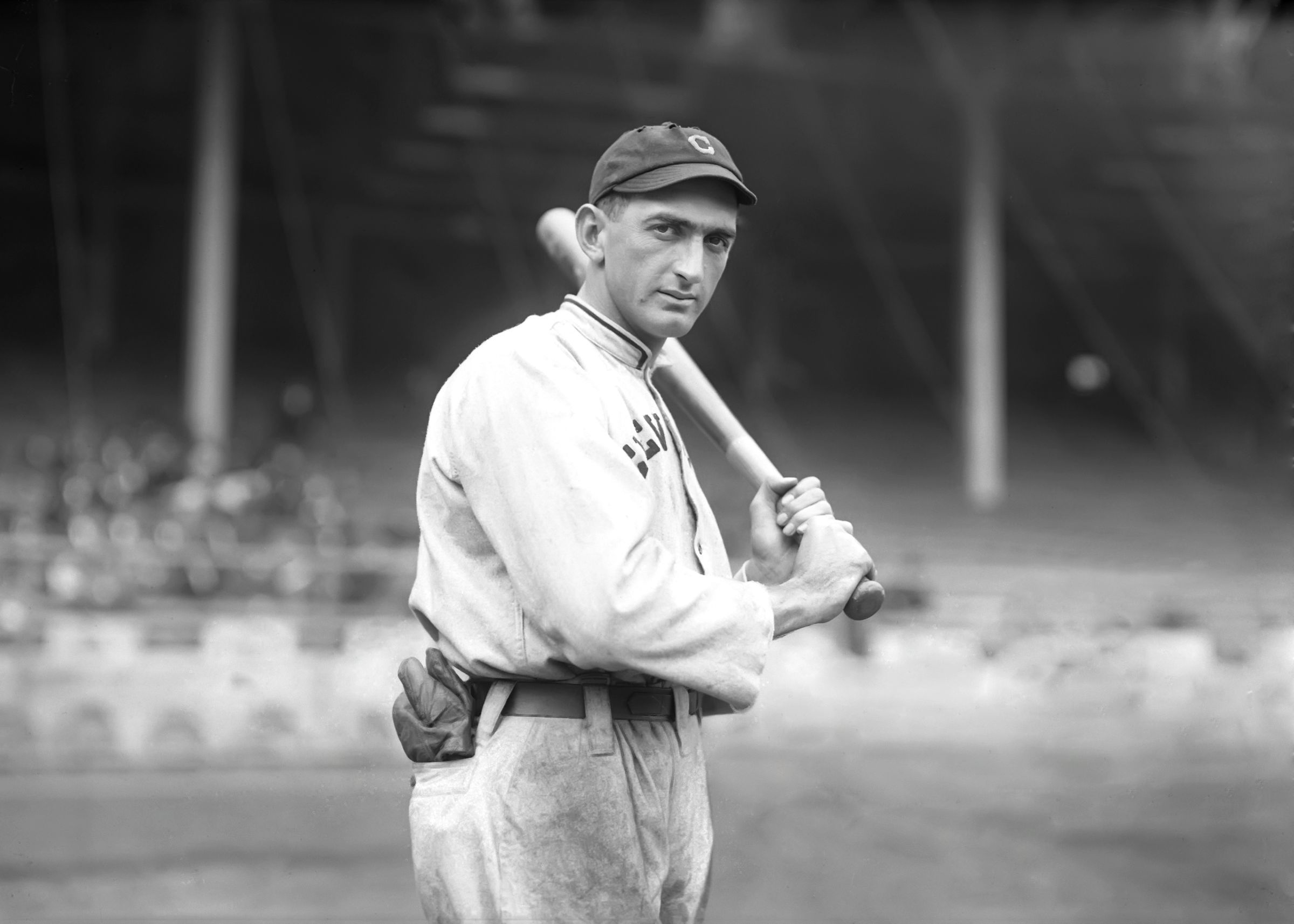
Joe Jackson

Jackson was the unquestioned star of the White Sox. The left fielder hit .351 that season, fourth in the league and in the AL's top five in slugging percentage, RBI, total bases and base hits. He was not the only star in a lineup with hardly a weak spot, as former Philadelphia Athletics superstar leadoff hitter Eddie Collins, one of the greatest second basemen of all time, was still going strong in his early thirties, hitting .319 with a .400 on-base percentage. Right fielder Nemo Leibold hit .302 with 81 runs scored. First baseman Chick Gandil hit .290, third baseman Buck Weaver .296, and center fielder Oscar "Hap" Felsch hit .275 and tied Jackson for the team lead in home runs with only seven (as the dead-ball era was coming to a close). Even typical "good field, no hit" catcher Ray Schalk hit .282 that year, and shortstop Swede Risberg was not an automatic out with the .256 average and 38 RBI. Gleason's bench contained two impressive hitters, outfielder Shano Collins and infielder Fred McMullin, both veterans of the 1917 series.

Eddie Cicotte recorded a 29–7 record, leading the league in wins and ranking second in earned run average to Walter Johnson. Claude "Lefty" Williams finished with a 23–11 record and a 2.64 ERA. Dickey Kerr started 17 games and recorded a 13–7 record with a 2.88 ERA. Urban "Red" Faber had an 11–9 record with a 3.83 ERA in 20 starts. Faber was unable to pitch in the series due to illness, leaving manager Kid Gleason with three starting pitchers.

However, all was not well in the White Sox camp. Tension ran high between many of the players and Comiskey given his penny-pinching ways, memorialized in two urban legends: (1) that he told Gleason to shut down Cicotte in the last days of the regular season to prevent him from winning thirty games, a milestone which would have earned him a sizeable $10,000 bonus; (2) that many derided the White Sox as the "Black Sox" because Comiskey wouldn't pay to have their uniforms laundered regularly, and they became blacker and blacker due to accumulated sweat, grime and dirt.

=== Cincinnati Reds ===
In contrast to the White Sox, the 1919 Cincinnati Reds were upstarts. They had finished no higher than third since 1900, and then only twice, before winning the National League (NL) pennant handily in 1919. Under new manager Pat Moran, best known as the leader of another bunch of unlikely newcomers to the World Series, the 1915 Philadelphia Phillies, the Reds finished nine games in front of the runner-up Giants at 96–44 and at least twenty games ahead of the other six, with the second highest NL won-lost percentage since 1910 at .686.

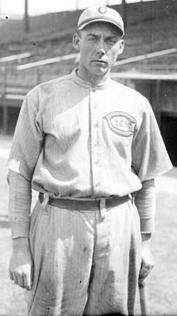
Edd Roush

The Reds' greatest star was center fielder Edd Roush, who led the league in hitting at .321 and, like the White Sox's Jackson, was in the top five of their respective leagues in most important hitting categories. Third baseman Heinie Groh was the other great hitter on the team at .310 with a .392 on-base percentage and 79 runs scored. Slick-fielding first baseman Jake Daubert, a two-time National League batting champion with Brooklyn earlier in the decade, also scored 79 runs and hit .276, while catcher Ivey Wingo hit .273. The rest of the team was unheralded, including second baseman Morrie Rath, a .264 hitter with no power but a good on-base percentage, and shortstop Larry Kopf, a .270 singles hitter. The corner outfielders were decidedly weaker hitters, with former Phillies star left fielder Sherry Magee's .215 in 56 games and right fielder Earle "Greasy" Neale's .242 with little power. This would prompt Moran to start rookie Pat Duncan in left field in the 1919 series.

However, the Reds had a strong pitching rotation. The team's big three included Hod Eller (20–9, 2.39), Dutch Ruether (19–6, 1.82) and Slim Sallee (21–7, 2.06), all among the league leaders in various categories. They were backed by three other pitchers who were almost as successful: Jimmy Ring at only 10–9 but 2.26, Ray Fisher at 14–5 and 2.17 with five shutouts, and Cuban Dolf Luque at 10–3 and 2.63, former and future Giant who would win the last game of the 1933 World Series in long relief for New York.

== The fix ==
The conspiring players on the White Sox got an unexpected assist when a flu-stricken Faber was left off the World Series roster. Indeed, years later, catcher Schalk said that had Faber been healthy, there never would have been a fix (since he almost certainly would have gotten starts that went to Cicotte or Williams). Despite their many wins on the field, the Sox were an unhappy team. Many observers blame their attitude on Comiskey's stinginess, despite the fact that the 1919 White Sox payroll was third highest in the AL, behind only Boston and New York.

Stories about the scandal have usually included Comiskey in its gallery of subsidiary villains, focusing in particular on his intentions regarding a clause in Cicotte's contract that would have paid the knuckleballer an additional $10,000 bonus for winning thirty games. According to Eliot Asinof's account of the events, Eight Men Out, Cicotte was "rested" for the season's final two weeks after reaching his 29th win presumably to deny him the bonus, but the truth may be more complex. Cicotte won his 29th game on September 19, had an ineffective start on September 24 and was pulled after a few innings in a tuneup on the season's final day, September 28 (three days before the World Series opener). In addition, Cicotte reportedly agreed to the fix the same day he won his 29th game before he could have known of any efforts to deny him a chance to win his 30th. The story was probably true with regard to the 1917 season, however, when Cicotte won 28 games and hurled the White Sox to the championship.

Although rumors were swirling among gamblers (according to Tom Meany in his chapter on the 1919 Reds in "Baseball's Greatest Teams," "Cincinnati money was pouring in" even though the White Sox were regarded as the overwhelming favorite) and some of the press, most fans and observers were taking the Series at face value. On October 2, the day of Game 2, the Philadelphia Bulletin published a poem which would quickly prove to be ironic:

Still, it really doesn't matter,
After all, who wins the flag.
Good clean sport is what we're after,
And we aim to make our brag
To each near or distant nation
Whereon shines the sporting sun
That of all our games gymnastic
Base ball is the cleanest one!

== Summary ==
Newsreel showing portions of the Series.

NL Cincinnati Reds (5) vs. AL Chicago White Sox (3)

| Game | Date | Score | Location | Time | Attendance |
|---|---|---|---|---|---|
| 1 | October 1 | Chicago White Sox – 1, Cincinnati Reds – 9 | Redland Field | 1:42 | 30,511 |
| 2 | October 2 | Chicago White Sox – 2, Cincinnati Reds – 4 | Redland Field | 1:42 | 29,698 |
| 3 | October 3 | Cincinnati Reds – 0, Chicago White Sox – 3 | Comiskey Park | 1:30 | 29,126 |
| 4 | October 4 | Cincinnati Reds – 2, Chicago White Sox – 0 | Comiskey Park | 1:37 | 34,363 |
| 5 | October 6 | Cincinnati Reds – 5, Chicago White Sox – 0 | Comiskey Park | 1:45 | 34,379 |
| 6 | October 7 | Chicago White Sox – 5, Cincinnati Reds – 4 (10) | Redland Field | 2:06 | 32,006 |
| 7 | October 8 | Chicago White Sox – 4, Cincinnati Reds – 1 | Redland Field | 1:47 | 13,923 |
| 8 | October 9 | Cincinnati Reds – 10, Chicago White Sox – 5 | Comiskey Park | 2:27 | 32,930 |

== Matchups ==
=== Game 1 ===
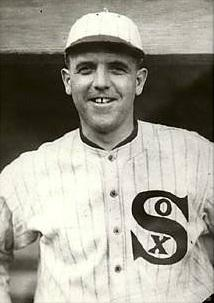
Eddie Cicotte

Wednesday, October 1, 1919 3:00 pm (ET) at Redland Field in Cincinnati, Ohio
| Team | 1 | 2 | 3 | 4 | 5 | 6 | 7 | 8 | 9 | R | H | E |
|---|---|---|---|---|---|---|---|---|---|---|---|---|
| Chicago | 0 | 1 | 0 | 0 | 0 | 0 | 0 | 0 | 0 | 1 | 6 | 1 |
| Cincinnati | 1 | 0 | 0 | 5 | 0 | 0 | 2 | 1 | X | 9 | 14 | 1 |
WP: Walter "Dutch" Ruether (1–0) LP: Eddie Cicotte (0–1)

The first game began at 3 pm at Cincinnati's Redland Field, with 30,511 fans in the stands and ticket scalpers outside the park raking in at least $50 per ticket. Chicago failed to score in the top of the first. In the bottom of the inning, Cicotte (who was paid his $10,000 the night before the series began) took the mound and hit the leadoff hitter (and former teammate), Morrie Rath, in the back with his second pitch, a prearranged signal to Arnold Rothstein that the fix was on. Even so, the game remained close for a while, due in part to some excellent defense from the conspirators, seeking to deflect suspicion from themselves. In the fourth, however, Cicotte "went haywire" (again according to Meany, op. cit.), allowing a number of hits in succession climaxed by a two-out triple to the opposing pitcher, as the Reds scored five times to break a 1–1 tie. Cicotte was relieved at that point, but the damage was done and the Reds went on to add three more runs in later innings and win 9–1.

Sportswriters thought that a bad throw by Cicotte to Risberg in the fourth inning, which prevented a possible double play, was suspicious. By that evening, there already were signs that things were going wrong. Only Cicotte, who had shrewdly demanded his $10,000 in advance, had been paid. "Sleepy" Bill Burns and Maharg met with Abe Attell, the former world boxing champ and Rothstein's intermediary, but he withheld the next installment ($20,000) nonetheless to bet on the next game. The next morning Gandil met Attell and again demanded money, but again to no avail.

=== Game 2 ===
Thursday, October 2, 1919 3:00 pm (ET) at Redland Field in Cincinnati, Ohio
| Team | 1 | 2 | 3 | 4 | 5 | 6 | 7 | 8 | 9 | R | H | E |
|---|---|---|---|---|---|---|---|---|---|---|---|---|
| Chicago | 0 | 0 | 0 | 0 | 0 | 0 | 2 | 0 | 0 | 2 | 10 | 1 |
| Cincinnati | 0 | 0 | 0 | 3 | 0 | 1 | 0 | 0 | X | 4 | 4 | 3 |
WP: Harry "Slim" Sallee (1–0) LP: Lefty Williams (0–1)

Although they had not received their money, the players were still willing to go through with the fix. "Lefty" Williams, the starting pitcher in Game 2, was not going to be as obvious as Cicotte. After a shaky start, he pitched well until the fourth inning, when he walked three and gave up as many runs. After that he became virtually unhittable again, giving up only one more run; but lack of clutch hitting, with Gandil a particularly guilty party, led to a 4–2 White Sox loss. Attell was still in no mood to pay up afterwards, but Burns managed to get hold of $10,000 and gave it to Gandil, who distributed it among the conspirators. The teams headed northwest to Comiskey Park in Chicago for Game 3 the next day, with no days off for travel in this Series.

=== Game 3 ===
Friday, October 3, 1919 2:00 pm (CT) at Comiskey Park in Chicago, Illinois
| Team | 1 | 2 | 3 | 4 | 5 | 6 | 7 | 8 | 9 | R | H | E |
|---|---|---|---|---|---|---|---|---|---|---|---|---|
| Cincinnati | 0 | 0 | 0 | 0 | 0 | 0 | 0 | 0 | 0 | 0 | 3 | 1 |
| Chicago | 0 | 2 | 0 | 1 | 0 | 0 | 0 | 0 | X | 3 | 7 | 0 |
WP: Dickey Kerr (1–0) LP: Ray Fisher (0–1)

Rookie pitcher Dickey Kerr, the Game 3 starter for the Sox, was not in on the fix. The original plan was for the conspirators, who disliked Kerr, to lose this game, but by now dissent among the players meant that the plan was in disarray. Burns still had faith and gathered the last of his resources to bet on Cincinnati. It was a decision that would leave him broke, as Chicago scored early—with Gandil himself driving in two runs—and Kerr was masterful, holding the Reds to three hits in a 3–0 complete game shutout.

=== Game 4 ===
Saturday, October 4, 1919 2:00 pm (CT) at Comiskey Park in Chicago, Illinois
| Team | 1 | 2 | 3 | 4 | 5 | 6 | 7 | 8 | 9 | R | H | E |
|---|---|---|---|---|---|---|---|---|---|---|---|---|
| Cincinnati | 0 | 0 | 0 | 0 | 2 | 0 | 0 | 0 | 0 | 2 | 5 | 2 |
| Chicago | 0 | 0 | 0 | 0 | 0 | 0 | 0 | 0 | 0 | 0 | 3 | 2 |
WP: Jimmy Ring (1–0) LP: Eddie Cicotte (0–2)

Cicotte took the mound again for Game 4, and was determined not to look as bad as he had in Game 1. For the first four innings, he and Reds pitcher Jimmy Ring matched zeroes. With one out in the fifth, Cicotte fielded a slow roller by Pat Duncan but threw wildly to first for a two-base error. The next man up, Larry Kopf, singled to left; Cicotte cut off the throw from Jackson and fumbled the ball, allowing Duncan to score. The home crowd was stunned by the veteran pitcher's obvious mistake. Cicotte then surrendered a double to Greasy Neale which scored Kopf to make it 2–0; this was enough of a lead for Ring, who hurled a three-hit shutout of his own, matching Kerr's in Game 3. The Reds led the Series 3–1.

After the game "Sport" Sullivan came through with $20,000 for the players, which Gandil split equally among Risberg, Felsch, and Williams, who was due to start Game 5 the next day.

=== Game 5 ===
Monday, October 6, 1919 2:00 pm (CT) at Comiskey Park in Chicago, Illinois
| Team | 1 | 2 | 3 | 4 | 5 | 6 | 7 | 8 | 9 | R | H | E |
|---|---|---|---|---|---|---|---|---|---|---|---|---|
| Cincinnati | 0 | 0 | 0 | 0 | 0 | 4 | 0 | 0 | 1 | 5 | 4 | 0 |
| Chicago | 0 | 0 | 0 | 0 | 0 | 0 | 0 | 0 | 0 | 0 | 3 | 3 |
WP: Hod Eller (1–0) LP: Lefty Williams (0–2)

Game 5 was postponed by rain for a day. Both starters, Williams and Cincinnati's Hod Eller, pitched excellently at first, with neither allowing a runner past first until the top of the sixth, when Eller himself hit a blooper that fell between Felsch and Jackson. Felsch's throw was offline, sending Eller all the way to third. Leadoff hitter Morrie Rath then singled over the drawn-in infield, scoring Eller. Heinie Groh walked before Edd Roush's double—the result of more doubtful defense from Felsch—brought home two more runs, with Roush scoring shortly thereafter. Eller pitched well enough (he struck out nine batters, including a then-World Series record six in a row, since tied by Moe Drabowsky in the 1966 World Series opener) for the four runs to stand up, and the Reds were only one game away from their first world championship.

=== Game 6 ===
Tuesday, October 7, 1919 3:00 pm (ET) at Redland Field in Cincinnati, Ohio
| Team | 1 | 2 | 3 | 4 | 5 | 6 | 7 | 8 | 9 | 10 | R | H | E |
|---|---|---|---|---|---|---|---|---|---|---|---|---|---|
| Chicago | 0 | 0 | 0 | 0 | 1 | 3 | 0 | 0 | 0 | 1 | 5 | 10 | 3 |
| Cincinnati | 0 | 0 | 2 | 2 | 0 | 0 | 0 | 0 | 0 | 0 | 4 | 11 | 0 |
WP: Dickey Kerr (2–0) LP: Jimmy Ring (1–1)

The Series reverted to Cincinnati for Game 6. Dickey Kerr, starting for the White Sox, was less dominant than in Game 3. Aided by three White Sox errors, the Reds jumped out to a 4–0 lead before Chicago fought back, tying the game at 4–4 in the sixth, which remained the score into extra innings. In the top of the tenth, Gandil drove in Weaver to make it 5–4, and Kerr closed it out to record his — and Chicago's — second win.

=== Game 7 ===
Wednesday, October 8, 1919 3:00 pm (ET) at Redland Field in Cincinnati, Ohio
| Team | 1 | 2 | 3 | 4 | 5 | 6 | 7 | 8 | 9 | R | H | E |
|---|---|---|---|---|---|---|---|---|---|---|---|---|
| Chicago | 1 | 0 | 1 | 0 | 2 | 0 | 0 | 0 | 0 | 4 | 10 | 1 |
| Cincinnati | 0 | 0 | 0 | 0 | 0 | 1 | 0 | 0 | 0 | 1 | 7 | 4 |
WP: Eddie Cicotte (1–2) LP: Harry "Slim" Sallee (1–1)

Despite the rumors already circulating about Cicotte's erratic performances in Games 1 and 4, White Sox manager Kid Gleason showed faith in his ace for Game 7. This time, the knuckleballer did not let him down. Chicago scored early and, for once, it was Cincinnati that committed errors. The Reds threatened only briefly in the sixth before losing 4–1, and suddenly the Series was relatively close again.

This did not go unnoticed by Sullivan and Rothstein, who were suddenly worried. Before the Series started, the Sox had been strong favorites and few doubted they could win two games in a row—presuming that they were trying to win. Rothstein had been too smart to bet on individual games, but had $270,000 riding on Cincinnati to win the Series. The night before Game 8, Williams—the scheduled starter—was supposedly visited by an associate of Sullivan's known as Harry F. He left no doubt that if Williams failed to blow the game in the first inning, he and his wife would be in serious danger.

Chicago wouldn't see another Game 7 for over a century.

=== Game 8 ===
Thursday, October 9, 1919 2:00 pm (CT) at Comiskey Park in Chicago, Illinois
| Team | 1 | 2 | 3 | 4 | 5 | 6 | 7 | 8 | 9 | R | H | E |
|---|---|---|---|---|---|---|---|---|---|---|---|---|
| Cincinnati | 4 | 1 | 0 | 0 | 1 | 3 | 0 | 1 | 0 | 10 | 16 | 2 |
| Chicago | 0 | 0 | 1 | 0 | 0 | 0 | 0 | 4 | 0 | 5 | 10 | 1 |
WP: Hod Eller (2–0) LP: Lefty Williams (0–3); Home runs: CIN: None; CWS: Joe Jackson (1)

Whatever Williams had been told made its impression. In the first, throwing nothing but mediocre fastballs, he gave up four straight one-out hits for three runs before Gleason relieved him with "Big" Bill James, who allowed one of Williams' baserunners to score. James continued ineffective and, although the Sox rallied in the eighth, the Reds came away with a 10–5 victory for a five-games-to-three Series win. Jackson hit the only homer of the Series in the third inning after the Reds had built a 5–0 lead. Immediately after the Series ended, rumors were rife from coast to coast that the games had been thrown. Journalist Hugh Fullerton of the Chicago Herald and Examiner, disgusted by the display of ineptitude with which the White Sox had "thrown" the series, wrote that no World Series should ever be played again.

== Composite line score ==
1919 World Series (5–3): Cincinnati Reds (N.L.) over Chicago White Sox (A.L.)

| Team | 1 | 2 | 3 | 4 | 5 | 6 | 7 | 8 | 9 | 10 | R | H | E |
|---|---|---|---|---|---|---|---|---|---|---|---|---|---|
| Cincinnati Reds | 5 | 1 | 2 | 10 | 3 | 9 | 2 | 2 | 1 | 0 | 35 | 64 | 13 |
| Chicago White Sox | 1 | 3 | 2 | 1 | 3 | 3 | 2 | 4 | 0 | 1 | 20 | 59 | 12 |
Total attendance: 236,936 Average attendance: 29,617; Winning player's share: $5,207 Losing player's share: $3,254

== Notable performances ==
Jackson led all players with his .375 average. Some believed that most of his offensive potency came in games that were not fixed and/or when the game seemed out of reach. He hit the Series' lone home run in the eighth and final game, a solo shot in the third inning, by which time the Reds were already ahead 5–0. His five hits with runners in scoring position came in: Game 6, sixth inning with Kerr pitching; Game 7, first and third innings; Game 8, two in the four-run eighth.

Shoeless Joe had 12 hits overall, a World Series record at that time and tied for the most in an eight-game series.

=== Cincinnati Reds ===
- Greasy Neale (OF): 10-for-28; .357 batting average; 3 runs; 2 doubles; 1 triple; 4 RBI
- Hod Eller (P): 2 complete games (1 shutout); 2 wins; 18 innings pitched; 13 hits allowed, 4 earned runs; 2 bases-on-balls; 15 strikeouts; 2.00 ERA

=== Chicago White Sox ===
- Joe Jackson (OF): 12-for-32; .375 batting average; 5-for-12 w/ men in scoring position; 5 runs; 3 doubles; 1 home run; 6 RBI
- Ray Schalk (C): 7-for-23; .304 batting average; 2-for-3 w/ men in scoring position; 1 run; 2 RBI
- Buck Weaver (3B): 11-for-34; .324 batting average; 1-for-5 w/ men in scoring position; 4 runs; 4 doubles; 1 triple
- Dickey Kerr (P): 2 games (started); 2 complete games (1 shutout); 2 wins; 19 innings pitched; 14 hits allowed; 3 earned runs; 3 bases-on-balls; 6 strikeouts; 1.42 ERA

== Aftermath ==
The Reds would make their next World Series appearance two decades later, but were swept by the New York Yankees, becoming the last victim of a Yankees dynasty of four straight championships from 1936 to 1939. They would win their next championship in 1940 over the Detroit Tigers in seven games after being nine outs away from elimination in Game 7.

The scandal cast a shadow that lasted decades. Chicago didn't return to the World Series until 1959, lost to the Dodgers in six, and wouldn't win it all again until 2005 — 86 years after the fix.

== Cultural legacy ==
- A Pathé Newsreel with a few minutes of footage of the series, including the suspicious Cicotte–Risberg throw, was found in the Dawson Film Find in 1978.
- The eight banned players, most prominently Shoeless Joe Jackson, are principal characters in the 1982 novel Shoeless Joe, and its 1989 film adaptation, Field of Dreams.
- The 1988 film Eight Men Out, based on the book by Eliot Asinof, is about the fix itself.
