= Eddie Cicotte =

American baseball player (1884–1969)

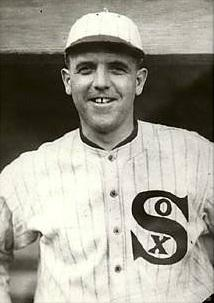
- Cicotte c. 1919
- Pitcher
- Born: June 19, 1884; Springwells Township, Michigan, U.S.
- Died: May 5, 1969 (aged 84); Detroit, Michigan, U.S.
- Batted: Both Threw: Right

MLB debut
- September 3, 1905, for the Detroit Tigers

Last MLB appearance
- September 26, 1920, for the Chicago White Sox

MLB statistics
- Win–loss record: 208–149
- Earned run average: 2.38
- Strikeouts: 1,374
- Stats at Baseball Reference

Teams
- Detroit Tigers (1905); Boston Red Sox (1908–1912); Chicago White Sox (1912–1920)

Career highlights and awards
- World Series champion (1917); 2× AL wins leader (1917, 1919); AL ERA leader (1917); Pitched a no-hitter on April 14, 1917

Edward Victor Cicotte (/ˈsiːkɒt/; June 19, 1884 – May 5, 1969), nicknamed "Knuckles", was an American right-handed pitcher in Major League Baseball best known for his time with the Chicago White Sox. He was one of eight players permanently ineligible for professional baseball for his alleged participation in the Black Sox scandal in the 1919 World Series, in which the favored White Sox lost to the Cincinnati Reds in eight games. The "fixing" of the 1919 World Series is the only recognized gambling scandal to tarnish a World Series.

== Family ==
Cicotte was the son of Ambrose Cicotte and Archange Mary Drouillard, both of mainly French-Canadian extraction. He married Rose Ellen Freer, daughter of Russell John Freer and Annie Cecile Thornton, both of whom would later live with the Cicottes. They had two daughters, Rose and Virginia, and one son, Edward Jr.

== Career ==
Cicotte was a starting pitcher and a knuckleball specialist who won 208 games and lost 149 over the course of a 14-year career pitching for the Detroit Tigers, Boston Red Sox, and Chicago White Sox. At the time of his lifetime ban, he was considered one of the premier pitchers in the American League.

A Detroit native, Cicotte played minor league baseball for the Augusta Tourists in Georgia in 1905, where he was a teammate of Ty Cobb. Both players were purchased by the Tigers, and Cicotte made his big-league debut on September 3, 1905. Pitching in three games for Detroit, Cicotte compiled a 1–1 record with a 3.50 earned run average (ERA).

Cicotte did not return to the major leagues again until 1908, when he resurfaced with the Red Sox. After he compiled a 41–48 record in a Boston uniform, the Red Sox sold him to the White Sox on July 22, 1912.

Cicotte celebrated a breakout year in 1913, going 18–11 on the season with an ERA of 1.58. He led the league in winning percentage in 1916, but his best year was 1917, when he won 28 games and led the league in wins, ERA, and innings pitched. On April 14 he threw a no hitter against the St. Louis Browns. From September 15, 1916, to July 25, 1917, Cicotte pitched 25 straight starts in which he allowed three earned runs or less with at least six innings pitched, which retroactively became known as the quality start. Cicotte's 25 game streak was the most for a half-century until Bob Gibson passed him. That year, the White Sox went to the World Series, defeating the New York Giants 4 games to 2. Cicotte won Game 1, lost Game 3, and pitched six innings of relief in Game 5 for a no-decision.

Injuries reduced Cicotte to a 12–19 record in 1918, but in 1919, he rebounded to win 29 games and once again led the league in wins, winning percentage, and innings pitched, as well as in complete games. His 1919 salary was $6,000, but he had a provision for a $10,000 bonus if he won 30 games. Legend has it that as the season drew to a close, owner Charles Comiskey ordered manager Kid Gleason to bench Cicotte for five games, denying him a chance at a 30-win season and the bonus money.

== Scandal ==
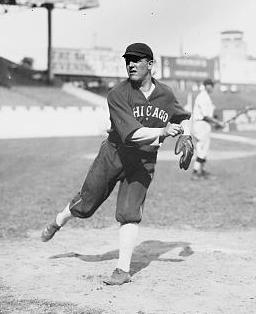
Cicotte in 1913

The book Eight Men Out by Eliot Asinof and the movie based on the book does record that Cicotte, despite being grossly underpaid for a pitcher of his ability, resisted repeated attempts by Chick Gandil to get him to throw the series until just days before the World Series opened when it became clear that Comiskey would never pay him even part of the promised bonus.

In the 1919 World Series against the Reds, Cicotte pitched in three games, winning one but losing the other two, accumulating a 2.91 ERA for the Series.

Cicotte was the first of the eight players to come forward, signing a confession and a waiver of immunity. He later recanted this confession and was acquitted of all charges at trial by jury. Despite this, Cicotte and his alleged co-conspirators were subsequently made permanently ineligible for baseball by Kenesaw Mountain Landis, Major League Baseball's new commissioner, recently hired to restore the integrity of the game in the wake of the 1919 scandal.

Cicotte was reinstated by Commissioner Rob Manfred on May 13, 2025 along with other deceased players who were on the ineligible list.

== Aftermath ==
After being banned from playing baseball, Cicotte returned to Livonia, Michigan. He managed a service station, served as a game warden in the Michigan Department of Natural Resources, then went to work for Ford Motor Company, where he retired in 1944. Cicotte lived to be 84 years old. He was a strawberry farmer on a 5.5-acre (2.2 ha) farm near Farmington until his death at Henry Ford Hospital in Detroit on May 5, 1969.

In the 1988 film Eight Men Out, about the Black Sox scandal, Cicotte is portrayed by actor David Strathairn.

He was portrayed by actor Steve Eastin in the 1989 film Field of Dreams.

Cicotte's grandnephew Al Cicotte (1929–1982) later pitched in the major leagues, compiling a lifetime 10–13 record with six teams between 1957 and 1962.

== See also ==
- List of knuckleball pitchers
- List of Major League Baseball career wins leaders
- List of Major League Baseball annual wins leaders
- List of Major League Baseball annual ERA leaders
- List of Major League Baseball no-hitters

Preceded by Dutch Leonard	No-hitter pitcher April 14, 1917	Succeeded by George Mogridge
