= Dickey Kerr =

American baseball player (1893–1963)

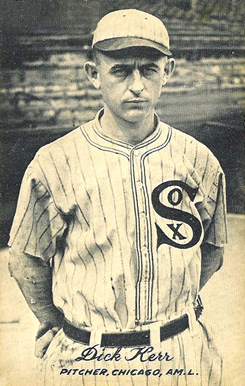
- Pitcher
- Born: July 3, 1893; St. Louis, Missouri, U.S.
- Died: May 4, 1963 (aged 69); Houston, Texas, U.S.
- Batted: Left Threw: Left

MLB debut
- April 25, 1919, for the Chicago White Sox

Last MLB appearance
- October 24, 1925, for the Chicago White Sox

MLB statistics
- Win–loss record: 53–34
- Earned run average: 3.84
- Strikeouts: 235
- Stats at Baseball Reference

Teams
- Chicago White Sox (1919–1921, 1925)

Richard Henry Kerr (July 3, 1893 – May 4, 1963) was an American professional baseball pitcher for the Chicago White Sox of Major League Baseball. He also served as a coach and manager in the minor leagues.

== Early life ==
Kerr was born in St. Louis, Missouri, one of Richard J. and Anna (née Tieman) Kerr's nine children. Kerr's father worked as a firefighter on rafts along the Mississippi. Prior to playing baseball, Kerr competed in amateur boxing.

Kerr married Cora (nicknamed "Pep") Downing at age 21, on July 7, 1914. The couple remained married until Kerr's death in 1963.

Kerr started playing baseball at 14 alongside amateur adult baseball players. In 1909, Kerr and one of his brothers joined the Paragould Scouts in the Northeast Arkansas League. He played for lower-level teams from 16 to 22, including the Cairo Egyptians and the Cleburne Railroaders. In 1917, he joined the Milwaukee Brewers of the American Association, then one of the top minor leagues, for whom he pitched 448 innings in two seasons.

== Professional baseball ==
Buck Weaver and Clarence "Pants" Rowland recommended Kerr for the major leagues and the Chicago White Sox team. This happened during the "work or fight order" of World War I. At the time Dickey was about 5’7 and weighed 155 pounds. Kerr was living in the Fairbanks and Morse areas of Wisconsin, and working in a factory. Weaver was a mechanic at one of the other shops at the same factory.

The owner of the Chicago White Sox at the time was Charles Comiskey, and the manager was Kid Gleason. Kerr played for the White Sox from 1919 to 1921.

Eight of Kerr's teammates took bribes to throw the 1919 World Series against the Cincinnati Reds. They would forever become known as the Chicago Black Sox. These teammates were permanently banned from Major League Baseball after throwing the World Series against the Cincinnati Reds were Chick Gandil, Happy Felsch, Eddie Cicotte, Shoeless Joe Jackson, Lefty Williams, Buck Weaver, Fred McMullin, and Swede Risberg. Kerr was not involved in the scandal and won both of the games he started.

Nevertheless, owner Comiskey refused to give Kerr what he believed to be a fair raise. Dickey held out for more pay before the 1922 season and refused to play. This resulted in a suspension from the White Sox. Kerr played exhibition games with other teams. This led to a suspension from the Major Leagues by Commissioner Kenesaw Landis. Kerr did not play Major League Baseball from 1922 to 1924.

Dickey returned to semiprofessional leagues. In 1925, Kerr made a short comeback to the major leagues, playing for the White Sox. Kerr had a 53–34 career record. From 1927 to 1938, Kerr played for minor league teams before retiring from his playing career.

=== Coach ===
From 1927 to 1940, Kerr worked as a coach. He began with the Rice University (then Rice Institute) Owls. He coached in Washington and West Virginia before accepting a position in Florida. Kerr began managing the Daytona Beach Islanders in the year of 1940.

His coaching led him to Stan Musial. Kerr told Musial, then beset by arm problems, to stop pitching and become a batter. Kerr's mentoring may have helped Musial attain his later success. Musial had a remarkable 3,630 base hits. In 1958, right before Musial's batting accomplishment, Kerr was working for an electric company. Musial gave Kerr a house for his birthday. He purchased the home for somewhere around $10,000–$20,000, from his income of around $100,000. Kerr lived there until his death in 1963.

== Legacy ==
Writer Jim Baker noted that of the thirteen principal members of the 1919 White Sox, only Kerr and Nemo Leibold neither were banned for life nor were selected for the National Baseball Hall of Fame. Kerr is not eligible for the Hall of Fame under the Hall's current rules, which require a player to have played in at least ten major league seasons (Kerr played in only four).

Although Kerr was never inducted into the Baseball Hall of Fame, his accomplishments received recognition. He "received the inaugural Tris Speaker Memorial Award from the Houston Chapter of the Baseball Writers' Association of America", an award given to athletes, and baseball officials that have made some sort of exceptional contribution towards the game. He received Houston's key to the city during a night honoring him in 1961 at Busch Stadium. A statue was dedicated to him at the Astrodome after his death.

Kerr lost his fight with cancer and died May 4, 1963, and he is buried in Houston, Texas at the Forest Park Lawndale Cemetery. Kerr's friend Stan Musial attended the Second Annual Old Timers' Game in honor of Kerr. His statue since has changed locations a few times. The bronze statue of Kerr started at the Astrodome and was last on display at Constellation Field. Its last known keeper was the Finger Family, and their curator Tom Kennedy.

In the 1988 film Eight Men Out, about the Black Sox scandal, Kerr was portrayed by actor Jace Alexander. The film inaccurately portrayed Kerr as a right-handed pitcher when in fact he was a lefty.

== See also ==
- List of Major League Baseball annual saves leaders
