= Nemo Leibold =

American baseball player (1892–1977)

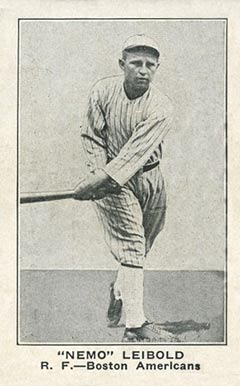
- Outfielder
- Born: February 17, 1892; Butler, Indiana, U.S.
- Died: February 4, 1977 (aged 84); Detroit, Michigan, U.S.
- Batted: Left Threw: Right

MLB debut
- April 12, 1913, for the Cleveland Naps

Last MLB appearance
- October 2, 1925, for the Washington Senators

MLB statistics
- Batting average: .266
- Home runs: 3
- Runs batted in: 283
- Stats at Baseball Reference

Teams
- Cleveland Naps (1913–1915); Chicago White Sox (1915–1920); Boston Red Sox (1921–1923); Washington Senators (1923–1925)

Career highlights and awards
- 2× World Series champion (1917, 1924)

Harry Loran "Nemo" Leibold (February 17, 1892 – February 4, 1977) was an American outfielder in Major League Baseball from 1913 to 1925. He played for the Cleveland Naps, Chicago White Sox, Boston Red Sox, and Washington Senators. He stood at 5 ft 6 in (1.68 m) and was nicknamed for the comic strip character Little Nemo.

== Career ==
Leibold began his professional career in 1911 with the minor league Milwaukee Brewers of the American Association. In 1913, he was traded to the Cleveland Naps, and he immediately broke into the starting lineup. He struggled early in 1915 and was released to the White Sox. In Chicago, Leibold was a member of two American League championship teams. He patrolled right field, alongside sluggers Shoeless Joe Jackson and Hap Felsch. His single in the ninth inning of the 1917 World Series drove in Buck Weaver with the final run of the championship-clinching game for the White Sox. He was the last surviving member of the 1917 World Champion Chicago White Sox.

Leibold hit well in 1919; in 122 games, he had a batting average of .302, 17 stolen bases, and set a career-high in OPS+ with 113. However, he batted .056 in the 1919 World Series, getting one hit in 18 at-bats. Leibold was one of just three regulars on the team not accused in the Black Sox Scandal. He was the last surviving player from the White Sox pennant-winners of 1917 and 1919. After the 1920 season, he was traded to the Boston Red Sox with Shano Collins for Harry Hooper, then played for the Red Sox and Washington Senators for 2.5 seasons each.

Leibold was sent down to the minor leagues in 1926. He was a player-manager for the Columbus Red Birds from 1928 to 1932, then rejoined the Red Sox as a manager in their farm system in 1933. In that role, he helmed five other teams—including the top-level Syracuse Chiefs (1935–1936) and Louisville Colonels (1944–1948)—before becoming a scout for the Detroit Tigers in 1949. In one game in 1946, he was suspended after shoving a minor league umpire, which caused other managers to resign in protest. Leibold managed the Colonels in the Junior World Series that season against the Montreal Royals and Jackie Robinson, losing 4 games to 2, thus involving him in baseball history again.

== Career statistics ==
In 13 seasons, Leibold compiled a .266 batting average with 1,109 hits, 638 runs scored, three home runs, 283 runs batted in, .357 on-base percentage and .327 slugging percentage. In 13 World Series games, he hit only .161 (5-31) with 3 runs and 2 RBI. His career fielding percentage was .961.

== Death and legacy ==
Leibold died at his home in Detroit, Michigan on February 5, 1977 at the age of 84.

On May 10, 2022, his place of birth the City of Butler, Indiana dedicated a little league ballfield in his honor with a mural and permanent plaque.
