= List of Chicago White Sox team records =

This is a list of team records for the Chicago White Sox professional baseball team.

== Single season records ==
=== Batting ===
- Batting average: Luke Appling, .388 (1936)
- On-base percentage: Frank Thomas, .487 (1994)
- Slugging percentage: Frank Thomas, .729 (1994)
- OPS: Frank Thomas, 1.217 (1994)
- Plate Appearances: Juan Pierre, (734)
- At bats: Orlando Cabrera, 661 (2008)
- Runs: Johnny Mostil, 135 (1925)
- Hits: Eddie Collins, 224 (1920)
- Total bases: Albert Belle, 399 (1998)
- Doubles: Albert Belle, 48 (1998)
- Triples: Shoeless Joe Jackson, 21 (1916)
- Home runs: Albert Belle, 49 (1998)
- Runs batted in: Albert Belle, 152 (1998)
- Walks: Frank Thomas, 138 (1991)
- Strikeouts: Colson Montgomery, 227 (2026) (also Major League Record)
- Stolen bases: Rudy Law, 77 (1983)
- Singles: Eddie Collins, 170 (1920)
- Runs created: Frank Thomas, 163 (2000)
- Extra-base hits: Albert Belle, 99 (1998)
- Times on base: Frank Thomas, 317 (1991)
- Hit by pitch: Sam Antonacci, 29 (2026)
- Sacrifice hits: Buck Weaver, 44 (1916)
- Intentional walks: Frank Thomas, 29 (1995)
- Grounded into double plays: George Bell, 29, (1992)
- At bats per strikeout: Eddie Collins, 63.1 (1923)
- At bats per home run: Frank Thomas, 10.5 (1994)
- Outs: Juan Pierre, 515 (2010)

=== Pitching ===
- ERA: Ed Walsh, 1.27 (1910)
- Wins: Ed Walsh, 40 (1908)
- Won-loss %: Jason Bere, .857 (1994)
- WHIP: Ed Walsh, .820, (1910)
- Hits allowed/9IP: Hoyt Wilhelm, 5.50 (1965)
- Walks/9IP: LaMarr Hoyt, 1.07 (1983)
- Strikeouts/9IP: Chris Sale, 11.9 (2015)
- Games: Wilbur Wood, 88 (1968)
- Saves: Bobby Thigpen, 57 (1990)
- Innings: Ed Walsh, 464 (1908)
- Strikeouts: Chris Sale, 274 (2015)
- Complete games: Ed Walsh, 42 (1908)
- Shutouts: Ed Walsh, 11 (1908)
- Home runs allowed: Floyd Bannister, 38 (1987)
- Walks allowed: Vern Kennedy, 147 (1936)
- Hits allowed: Wilbur Wood, 381 (1973)
- Strikeout to walk: Chris Sale, 6.5 (2015)
- Losses: Patsy Flaherty, 25 (1903)
- Earned runs allowed: Dickey Kerr, 162 (1921)
- Batters faced: Ed Walsh, 1,755 (1908)
- Games finished: Bobby Thigpen, 73 (1990)

== Career records ==
=== Batting ===
- Batting average: Shoeless Joe Jackson, .340
- On-base percentage: Frank Thomas, .427
- Slugging percentage: Frank Thomas, .568
- OPS: Frank Thomas, .995
- Games: Luke Appling, 2,422
- At bats: Luke Appling, 8,856
- Runs: Frank Thomas, 1,327
- Hits: Luke Appling, 2,749
- Total bases: Paul Konerko, 4,010
- Doubles: Frank Thomas, 447
- Home runs: Frank Thomas, 448
- Runs batted in: Frank Thomas, 1,465
- Walks: Frank Thomas, 1,466
- Strikeouts: Paul Konerko, 1,349
- Stolen bases: Eddie Collins, 368
- Singles: Luke Appling, 2,162
- Runs created: Frank Thomas, 1,700
- Extra-base hits: Frank Thomas, 906
- Times on base: Luke Appling, 4,062
- Hit by pitch: Minnie Miñoso, 145
- Sacrifice hits: Eddie Collins, 341
- Sacrifice flies: Frank Thomas, 109
- Intentional walks: Frank Thomas, 162
- Grounded into double plays: Paul Konerko, 271
- At bats per strikeout: Nellie Fox, 44.2
- At bats per home run: Frank Thomas, 15.5
- Outs: Nellie Fox, 6,470

=== Pitching ===
- ERA: Ed Walsh, 1.81 (also Major League Record)
- Wins: Ted Lyons, 260
- Won-loss %: Lefty Williams, .648
- WHIP: Hoyt Wilhelm, .935
- Hits allowed/9IP: Hoyt Wilhelm, 6.19
- Walks/9IP: Nick Altrock, 1.49
- Strikeouts/9IP: Chris Sale, 10.3
- Games: Red Faber, 669
- Saves: Bobby Thigpen, 201
- Innings: Ted Lyons, 4,161
- Strikeouts: Billy Pierce, 1,796
- Games started: Ted Lyons, 484
- Complete games: Ted Lyons, 356
- Shutouts: Ed Walsh, 57
- Home runs allowed: Billy Pierce, 241
- Walks allowed: Red Faber, 1,213
- Hits allowed: Ted Lyons, 4,489
- Strikeout to walk: Chris Sale, 4.69
- Losses: Ted Lyons, 230
- Earned runs allowed: Ted Lyons, 1,696
- Wild pitches: Ed Walsh, 83
- Hit batsmen: Red Faber, 103
- Batters faced: Ted Lyons, 17,846
- Games finished: Bobby Thigpen, 348

== See also ==
- List of Major League Baseball franchise postseason streaks
- List of Chicago White Sox award winners and league leaders
