= Swede Risberg =

American baseball player (1894–1975)

- Risberg c. 1919
- Shortstop
- Born: October 13, 1894; San Francisco, California, U.S.
- Died: October 13, 1975 (aged 81); Red Bluff, California, U.S.
- Batted: Right Threw: Right

MLB debut
- April 11, 1917, for the Chicago White Sox

Last MLB appearance
- September 27, 1920, for the Chicago White Sox

MLB statistics
- Batting average: .243
- Home runs: 6
- Runs batted in: 175
- Stats at Baseball Reference

Teams
- Chicago White Sox (1917–1920)

Career highlights and awards
- World Series champion (1917)

Charles August "Swede" Risberg (October 13, 1894 – October 13, 1975) was an American Major League Baseball shortstop. He played for the Chicago White Sox from 1917 to 1920 and is best known for his involvement in the 1919 Black Sox scandal.

== Background ==
Charles Risberg was born and raised in San Francisco, California. He had very little education growing up and withdrew from school in the third grade. However, he soon developed a reputation as a good semipro pitcher and began his professional baseball career in 1912.

Risberg soon converted to shortstop. In 1914, he hit .366 in the Class D Union Association and was acquired by the Venice Tigers of the Pacific Coast League. He was the club's utility infielder in 1915 and 1916, gaining acclaim for his defensive skills. He was then bought by the American League's Chicago White Sox in early 1917.

== Major League Baseball ==
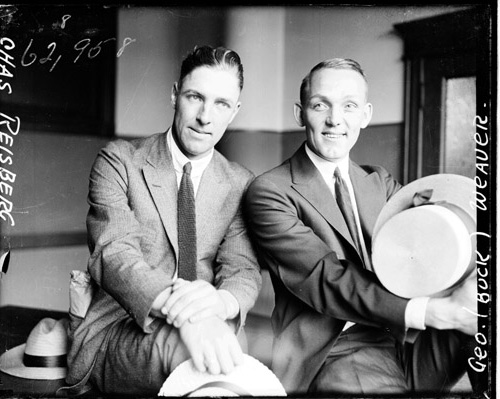
Risberg (left) and Buck Weaver at the 1921 trial.

Risberg made his debut on April 11, 1917, for the White Sox. He was a below-average hitter, but because of his superb defensive abilities, he won the full-time job at shortstop. Late in the season, Risberg experienced a terrible slump, and he only had two plate appearances, both as a pinch hitter, when the White Sox beat the New York Giants in the 1917 World Series.

The next season, Risberg briefly returned to California to work in a shipyard as part of the war effort. Although his job was termed essential and enabled him to avoid the draft, it consisted largely of playing baseball, as he batted .308 for the shipyard ballclub.

Risberg returned to the White Sox for the pennant-winning 1919 season. In September, he received positive press in the Atlanta Constitution, which labeled him a "miracle man" who had "blossomed out as a wonder" after making four plays that were "phenomenal." Chicago was heavy favorites in 1919 World Series versus the Cincinnati Reds. However, a group of White Sox players, including Risberg, agreed to intentionally lose the series in exchange for monetary payments from a network of gamblers. Risberg was one of the ringleaders, helping to convince some of his teammates to participate in the scheme. In the eight-game series, he was 2 for 25 at the plate and committed a World Series-record eight errors.

Risberg received $15,000 for his role in the fix, an amount that was more than four times his regular-season salary. The scandal broke in late 1920, and although the eight players were acquitted in the trial that followed, they were all banned from organized baseball by commissioner Kenesaw Mountain Landis.

Risberg was reinstated by Commissioner Rob Manfred on May 13, 2025, along with other deceased players who were on the ineligible list.

== Later years ==
Risberg continued to play semipro baseball for a decade after his banishment. According to one source, "he came to Minnesota in 1922 with a traveling team called the Mesaba Range Black Sox, which featured two other members of the 1919 Black Sox team: Happy Felsch and Lefty Williams."

He played throughout the midwestern United States and Canada. Columbus, North Dakota newspaper reports claimed Risberg played part of the 1927 season with a traveling team called Dellage's Cubans based in Lignite, North Dakota.

In 1926, Risberg was called to testify about a 1919 gambling scandal involving Ty Cobb and Tris Speaker. Although he presented no evidence regarding the 1919 scandal, he claimed that in 1917 he had collected money from other White Sox players to give to the Detroit Tigers for which the Tigers would intentionally lose some games. However, his story was contradicted by more than 30 other men and it was disregarded.

Risberg also worked on a dairy farm.

After his baseball career ended, he eventually ran a tavern and lumber business in the Northwest.

During his playing days, he had been spiked by an opposing player where the injury never properly healed, causing an eventual leg amputation later in his life. The amputation became necessary due to the severe spike wound near his knee sustained which never completely healed properly and eventually turned severely infected.

At the end of his life, he lived with his son and remained an avid baseball fan.

Risberg died in Red Bluff, California in 1975, on his 81st birthday.

He was the last living Black Sox player.

Risberg was portrayed by actor Don Harvey in the 1988 film Eight Men Out.

== See also ==
- List of people banned from Major League Baseball
