= Black Betsy =

Baseball bat

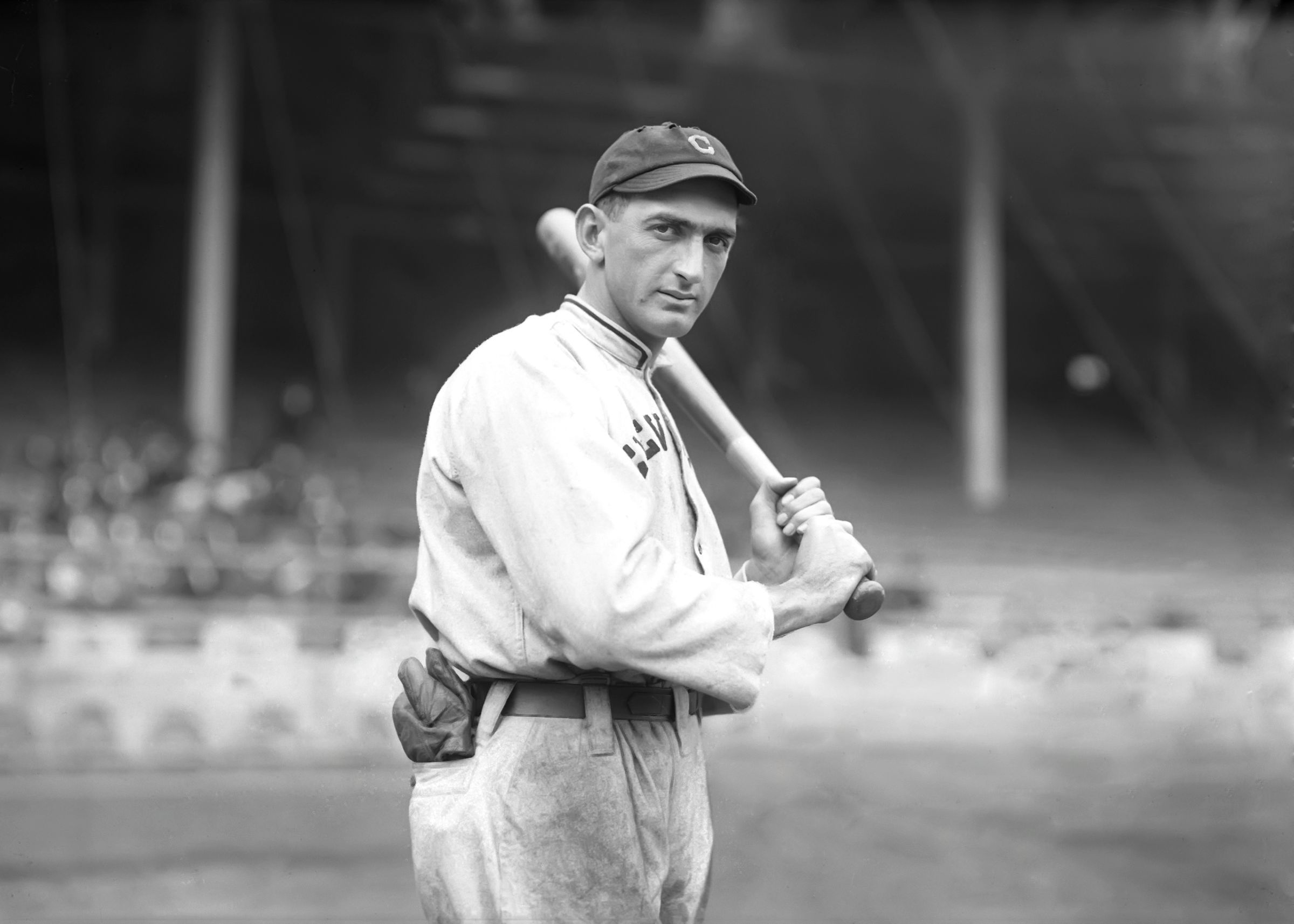
Shoeless Joe Jackson, Black Betsy in hand, during his 1913 season with the Cleveland Naps

Black Betsy was the primary baseball bat of Shoeless Joe Jackson. It was hand made by a fan of his in 1903 when Jackson was still only 15. It broke the record for the highest sold baseball bat in history, when it was sold for $577,610 in 2001. By then it was considered one of baseball's most fabled artifacts. The record was broken in 2004 when a 1923 Babe Ruth bat sold for $1.2 million. After Jackson's death, the bat was kept by his wife's family for over 40 years before being sold at auction.

== Creation ==
The bat was hand made by a local fan of the South Carolina mill teams, Charlie Ferguson, out of a bunk from the northern side of a hickory tree. It was 36 inches (91 cm) long and weighed 48 ounces (1.4 kg). Knowing that Jackson liked blacked bats, Fergerson darkened the bat with tobacco juice. Jackson took the bat to the minor leagues, where the fans often chanted "Give 'em Black Betsy" when Jackson came to bat.

== Major leagues ==
Jackson took the bat, his favorite, with him when he was sold to the Philadelphia Athletics of the American League. It broke in early 1911, and Jackson sent it to major-league bat manufacturer J. F. Hillerich Company to get it fixed. He used the bat for the rest of his major league career.

== Later owners ==
Jackson kept Black Betsy until his death in 1951. After his wife's death a few years later, it was bequeathed to her cousin and her son, Lester Erwin, who kept the bat on a bookcase for over 40 years. Erwin decided to sell the bat through eBay in 2001. In a 10-day auction, it gathered two bids. The winner, Rob Mitchell, owner of a marketing company in Pottstown, Pennsylvania, won, offering $525,100 plus a 10 percent buyer's premium. It was offered for auction again at Sotheby's on December 10, 2005, with an estimate of $300,000–$350,000, but failed to sell. An eBay auction in January 2008 failed to attract the minimum bid of $600,000. On April 24, 2008, it sold at Sotheby's for $301,000.

== Derivatives ==
Sporting goods companies Spalding and Hillerich & Bradsby and Rawlings produced reproductions of the bat for sale to fans, starting in the 1910s.

The National Pastime Museum, a virtual museum opened in 2013, included a bat described as "the rarest type of 'Black Betsy,' one that once launched many a line drive from 'Shoeless' Joe Jackson". The museum sold the bat at a Christie's auction in October 2016 for $583,500. The Christie's catalog called it a 1917–21 era Hillerich & Bradsby model, "one of two known professional model Joe Jackson bats, and the only full name script Signature model manufactured by Louisville Slugger that can be attributed to being used by Jackson.". In its report on the sale, Associated Press said, "Shoeless Joe's 'Black Betsy' bat is one of two known to survive from his career, and the only one with his full signature in script stamped into the barrel." Lester Erwin responded that the real 'Black Betsy' was the one he had sold in 2001, not the one sold in 2016.
