= Eight Men Out =

1988 film

- Theatrical release poster
- Directed by: John Sayles
- Screenplay by: John Sayles
- Based on: Eight Men Out by Eliot Asinof
- Produced by: Sarah Pillsbury
- Starring: John Cusack; Clifton James; Michael Lerner; Christopher Lloyd; Charlie Sheen; David Strathairn; D. B. Sweeney
- Cinematography: Robert Richardson
- Edited by: John Tintori
- Music by: Mason Daring
- Distributed by: Orion Pictures
- Release date: September 2, 1988 (United States)
- Running time: 119 minutes
- Country: United States
- Language: English
- Budget: $6.1 million
- Box office: $5.7 million

Eight Men Out is a 1988 American period sports drama film based on Eliot Asinof's 1963 book Eight Men Out: The Black Sox and the 1919 World Series. It was written and directed by John Sayles. The film is a dramatization of Major League Baseball's Black Sox Scandal in which eight members of the Chicago White Sox conspired with gamblers to lose the 1919 World Series. Most of the movie was filmed at Bush Stadium in Indianapolis, Indiana.

== Plot ==
In 1919, the Chicago White Sox have won the American League pennant and are considered among the greatest baseball teams; however, the team's owner, Charles Comiskey, shows little inclination to reward his players for the accomplishments of the season.

Gamblers "Sport" Sullivan, "Sleepy Bill" Burns, and Billy Maharg get wind of the players' discontent and ask player Chick Gandil to convince a select group of Sox—including, star knuckleball pitcher Eddie Cicotte, who led the Majors with a 29–7 win–loss record and an earned run average of 1.82, that they could earn more money by playing badly and throwing the series than they could earn by winning the Series against the Cincinnati Reds. Cicotte was motivated because Comiskey refused him a promised $10,000 should he win 30 games for the season. Cicotte was nearing the milestone when Comiskey ordered team manager Kid Gleason to bench him for two weeks (missing five starts) with the excuse that the 35-year-old veteran's arm needed a rest before the series.

A number of players, including Gandil, Swede Risberg, and Lefty Williams, go along with the scheme. "Shoeless Joe" Jackson, the team's illiterate superstar, is also invited but is depicted as not bright nor entirely sure of what is going on. Buck Weaver, meanwhile, insists that he is a winner and wants nothing to do with the fix.

When the best-of-nine World Series begins, Cicotte deliberately hits Reds leadoff hitter Morrie Rath in the back in Game 1 with his second pitch, a prearranged signal to gangster Arnold Rothstein that the fix is in. Cicotte pitches poorly and gives up five runs in four innings before being pulled, and the Sox lose the first game, 9–1. Williams also pitches poorly in Game 2, while Gandil, Risberg and Hap Felsch make glaring mistakes on the field. Several of the players become upset, however, when the various gamblers involved fail to pay their promised money up front.

Chicago journalists Ring Lardner and Hugh Fullerton grow increasingly suspicious while Gleason continues to hear rumors of a fix, but he remains confident that his team will come through in the end.

Rookie pitcher Dickie Kerr, not in on the scam, wins Game 3 for the Sox, making both gamblers and teammates uncomfortable. Other teammates, such as catcher Ray Schalk and second baseman Eddie Collins, play hard while Weaver and Jackson show no signs of taking a dive. Cicotte loses again in Game 4 and the Sox lose Game 5 as well. With the championship now in jeopardy, the Sox manage to win Game 6 in extra innings. Gleason intends to bench Cicotte, but Cicotte, feeling guilty over throwing his previous games, begs for another chance. The manager reluctantly agrees and earns an easy Game 7 win. Unpaid by the gamblers, Williams also intends to win, but when his wife's life is threatened, he purposely pitches so badly that he is quickly relieved by "Big Bill" James in the first inning. Jackson hits a home run off Reds pitcher Hod Eller in the third inning, but the team still loses the final game.

Cincinnati wins the series five games to three. Fullerton writes an article condemning the White Sox and an investigation begins. In 1920, Cicotte and Jackson sign confessions admitting to the fix, though the illiterate Jackson is implied as having been coerced into making his confession. As a result of the revelations, Cicotte, Williams, Gandil, Felsch, Risberg, Fred McMullin, Jackson, and Weaver are charged with conspiracy. The eight men are acquitted of any wrongdoing. However, newly appointed commissioner Kenesaw Mountain Landis bans all eight men for life because they either intentionally lost games or knew about the fix and did not report it to team officials as Weaver did.

In 1925, Weaver watches Jackson play a semi-pro game in New Jersey under the assumed name "Brown". Hearing other fans suspecting his true identity, Weaver tells them that Jackson was the best player he ever saw. When asked point-blank if the player is indeed Jackson, Weaver denies it, protecting his former teammate by telling the fans "those guys are gone now", solemnly reminiscing about the series. A title card reveals that the eight players banned from the scandal never returned to the majors. Weaver unsuccessfully attempted to have his ban overturned on several occasions until his death in 1956.

== Cast ==
- John Cusack as "Buck" Weaver
- Clifton James as Charles "Commy" Comiskey
- Michael Lerner as Arnold Rothstein
- Christopher Lloyd as Bill Burns
- John Mahoney as "Kid" Gleason
- Charlie Sheen as "Happy" Felsch
- David Strathairn as Eddie Cicotte
- D. B. Sweeney as "Shoeless Joe" Jackson
- Michael Rooker as "Chick" Gandil
- Don Harvey as "Swede" Risberg
- James Read as "Lefty" Williams
- Perry Lang as Fred McMullin
- Gordon Clapp as Ray Schalk
- Jace Alexander as Dickey Kerr
- Bill Irwin as Eddie Collins
- Richard Edson as Billy Maharg
- Kevin Tighe as "Sport" Sullivan
- Michael Mantell as Abe Attell
- John Anderson as Judge Kenesaw Mountain Landis
- Studs Terkel as Hugh Fullerton
- John Sayles as "Ring" Lardner
- Barbara Garrick as Helen Weaver
- Maggie Renzi as Rose Cicotte
- Wendy Makkena as Kate Jackson
- Nancy Travis as Lyria Williams

== Production ==
=== Development ===
In a 2013 interview, Sayles told MLB Network's Bob Costas, "People said, 'Oh, you’ll never get this made. There’s a curse on it. People have been trying to make it for years.'" Talking about his thoughts for the cast when he first wrote the script, Sayles said "my original dream team had Martin Sheen at third base, and I ended up with Charlie in center field."

=== Filming ===
During the late summer and early fall of 1987, news media in Indianapolis reported sightings of the film's actors, including Sheen and Cusack. Sayles told the Chicago Tribune that he hired them not because they were rising stars but because of their ball-playing talent.

Sweeney remarked on the chilly Indiana temperatures in an interview with Elle. "It got down to 30, 40 degrees, but John [Sayles] would stand there in running shorts, tank tops, sneakers—sometimes without socks—and never look cold." The young actor said Sayles appeared to be focused on an "agenda, and that's all he cared about. Looking at him we thought, 'Well, if he's not cold, then we certainly shouldn't be.'"

Reports from the set location at Bush Stadium indicated that cast members were letting off steam between scenes. "Actors kidded around, rubbing dirt on each other", the Tribune reported. "... Actors trade jokes, smokes and candy" in the dugout. "'Some of them chewed tobacco at first, but,' noted Bill Irwin, 'even the guys who were really into it started to chew apricots after a while.'" Sheen made his reasons for taking the role clear. "I'm not in this for cash or my career or my performance", Sheen said. "I wanted to take part in this film because I love baseball."

When cloud cover would suddenly change the light during the shooting of a particular baseball scene, Sayles showed "inspirational decisiveness", according to Elle, by changing the scripted game they would be shooting—switching from Game Two of the series to Game Four, for example. "The second assistant director knew nothing about baseball", Sayles said, "and she had to keep track of who was on base. Suddenly we'd change from Game Two to Game Four, and she'd have to shuffle through her papers to learn who was on second, then track the right guys down all over the ballpark."

Right-handed Sweeney told Elle that producers considered using an old Hollywood trick to create the illusion that he was hitting lefty. "We could have done it from the right side, then run to third and switched the negative, like they did in The Pride of the Yankees, but we didn't really have enough money for that", Sweeney said.

Ring Lardner, Jr., Oscar-winning screenwriter of such films as Woman of the Year and M*A*S*H, came to Bush Stadium to visit the set. Lardner's article in American Film reported that Sayles' script depicted much of the story accurately, based on what he knew from his father. But the audience, Lardner wrote, "won't have the satisfaction of knowing exactly why everything worked out the way it did."

Lardner also witnessed how the production crew had to make "a few hundred extras look like a World Series crowd of thousands" because they were hampered by the production's inability to entice a substantial number of Indianapolis residents to come to the stadium to act as film extras. Lardner stated, "The producers offer free entertainment, bingo with cash prizes, and as much of a stipend ($20 a day) as the budget permits..."

=== Legacy ===
Several people involved in the film would go on to work on Ken Burns's 1994 miniseries Baseball. Cusack, Lloyd, and Sweeney did voice-overs, recording reminiscences of various personalities connected with the game. Sayles and Terkel were interviewed about the 1919 World Series. Terkel also "reprised his role" by reading Hugh Fullerton's columns during the section on the Black Sox.

== Reception ==
The review aggregator website Rotten Tomatoes reported an approval rating of 87% based on 54 reviews, with an average rating of 7.1/10. The site's critics consensus reads, "Perhaps less than absorbing for non-baseball fans, but nevertheless underpinned by strong performances from the cast and John Sayles' solid direction." According to Metacritic, which calculated a weighted average score of 71 out of 100 based on 16 critics, the film received "generally favorable" reviews. Audiences polled by CinemaScore gave the film an average grade of "B" on an A+ to F scale.

Variety wrote: “Perhaps the saddest chapter in the annals of professional American sports is recounted in absorbing fashion in Eight Men Out... The most compelling figures here are pitcher Eddie Cicotte (David Strathairn), a man nearing the end of his career who feels the twin needs to ensure a financial future for his family and take revenge on his boss, and Buck Weaver (John Cusack), an innocent enthusiast who took no cash for the fix but, like the others, was forever banned from baseball."

Film critic Roger Ebert was underwhelmed, writing, "Eight Men Out is an oddly unfocused movie made of earth tones, sidelong glances and eliptic^{[sic]} conversations. It tells the story of how the stars of the 1919 Chicago White Sox team took payoffs from gamblers to throw the World Series, but if you are not already familiar with that story you're unlikely to understand it after seeing this film."

Ebert's colleague Gene Siskel, on the other hand, said, "Eight Men Out is fascinating if you are a baseball nut... the portrayal of the recruiting of the ball players and the tight fisted rule of Comiskey is fascinating... thumbs up."

In an overall positive review, critic Janet Maslin spoke well of the actors, writing, "Notable in the large and excellent cast of Eight Men Out are D. B. Sweeney, who gives Shoeless Joe Jackson the slow, voluptuous Southern naivete of the young Elvis; Michael Lerner, who plays the formidable gangster Arnold Rothstein with the quietest aplomb; Gordon Clapp as the team's firecracker of a catcher; John Mahoney as the worried manager who senses much more about his players' plans than he would like to, and Michael Rooker as the quintessential bad apple. Charlie Sheen is also good as the team's most suggestible player, the good-natured fellow who isn't sure whether it's worse to be corrupt or be a fool. The story's delightfully colorful villains are played by Christopher Lloyd and Richard Edson (as the halfway-comic duo who make the first assault on the players), Michael Mantell as the chief gangster's extremely undependable right-hand man, and Kevin Tighe as the Bostonian smoothie who coolly declares: 'You know what you feed a dray horse in the morning if you want a day's work out of him? Just enough so he knows he's hungry.' For Mr. Sayles, whose idealism has never been more affecting or apparent than it is in this story of boyish enthusiasm gone bad in an all too grown-up world, Eight Men Out represents a home run."

=== Accolades ===
The film is recognized by American Film Institute in these lists:

- 2008: AFI's 10 Top 10:
  - Nominated Sports Film

== Home media ==
Eight Men Out was released on video by Orion Home Video on April 27, 1989. It was released on DVD by MGM Home Entertainment (successor-in-interest to Orion Pictures) in two editions; a standard one on April 1, 2003, and a special edition on May 7, 2013. The latest Blu-ray version was released on April 23, 2024.

== See also ==
- List of baseball films
