= List of Cleveland Guardians team records =

Team records of the Cleveland Guardians baseball team:

== Single-season records ==
=== Consecutive wins ===
The Guardians currently hold the American League all time record for consecutive wins at 22 games.

=== Batting ===
- Games played: Leon Wagner, 163 (1964)
- Batting average: Shoeless Joe Jackson, .408 (1911)
- On-base percentage: Tris Speaker, .483 (1920)
- Slugging percentage: Albert Belle, .714, (1994)
- OPS: Manny Ramírez, 1.154, (2000)
- At bats: Joe Carter, 663 (1986)
- Runs: Earl Averill, 140 (1931)
- Hits: Shoeless Joe Jackson, 233 (1911)
- Total bases: Hal Trosky, 405 (1936)
- Singles: Charlie Jamieson, 172 (1923)
- Doubles: George Burns, 64 (1926)
- Triples: Shoeless Joe Jackson, 26 (1912)
- Home runs: Jim Thome, 52 (2002)
- Extra base hits: Albert Belle, 103 (1995)
- RBI: Manny Ramírez, 165 (1999)
- Bases on balls: Jim Thome, 127 (1999)
- Times on base: Tris Speaker, 316 (1920)
- Strikeouts: Mike Napoli, 194 (2016)
- Stolen bases: Kenny Lofton, 75 (1996)
- Stolen base percentage: Michael Brantley, 95.83% (2014)
- Sacrifice bunts: Ray Chapman, 67 (1917)
- Sacrifice flies: Juan González, 16 (2001)
- Grounded into double plays: Julio Franco, 28 (1986)
- Outs: Max Alvis, 515 (1967)
- Hit by pitches: Andrés Giménez, 25 (2022)
- At bats per strikeout: Joe Sewell, 152 (1925)
- At bats per home run: Jim Thome, 9.2 (2002)
- Hitting streak: Nap Lajoie, 31 games (1906)
- WAR (Baseball-Reference): Lou Boudreau, 10.4 (1948)

=== Pitching ===
- Wins: Jim Bagby, Sr., 31 (1920)
- Strikeouts: Bob Feller, 348 (1946)
- Saves: Emmanuel Clase, 47 (2024)
- ERA: Addie Joss, 1.16 (1908)
- Losses: Pete Dowling, 22 (1901)
- Innings pitched: Bob Feller, 371.1 (1946)
- Complete games: Bob Feller, 36 (1946)
- Home runs: Luis Tiant, 37 (1969)
- Bases on balls: Bob Feller, 208 (1938)
- Hits: George Uhle, 378 (1923)
- Hit by pitches: Otto Hess, 24 (1906)
- Strikeout-to-walk ratio: Corey Kluber, 7.361 (2017)
- Strikeouts per nine innings pitched: Shane Bieber, 14.198 (2020)
- WHIP: Addie Joss, 0.806 (1908)
- WAR (Baseball-Reference): Gaylord Perry, 10.8 (1972)

== Career records ==
=== Batting ===
- Games played: José Ramírez, 1,681
- Batting average: Shoeless Joe Jackson, .375
- On-base percentage: Tris Speaker, .444
- Slugging percentage: Manny Ramírez, .592
- OPS: Manny Ramírez, .998
- At bats: José Ramírez, 6,238
- Runs: Earl Averill, 1,154
- Hits: Nap Lajoie, 2,047
- Total bases: Earl Averill, 3,200
- Singles: Nap Lajoie, 1,512
- Doubles: Tris Speaker, 486
- Triples: Earl Averill, 121
- Home runs: Jim Thome, 337
- Extra base hits: José Ramírez, 754
- RBI: Earl Averill, 1,084
- Bases on balls: Jim Thome, 1,008
- Times on base: Tris Speaker, 2,864
- Strikeouts: Jim Thome, 1,400
- Stolen bases: Kenny Lofton, 452
- Stolen base percentage: Roberto Alomar, 86.89%
- Sacrifice bunts: Ray Chapman, 334
- Sacrifice flies: Omar Vizquel, 62
- Grounded into double plays: Julio Franco, 165
- Outs: Terry Turner, 4,610
- Hit by pitches: Travis Hafner, 85
- At bats per strikeout: Joe Sewell, 56.8
- At bats per home run: Jim Thome, 14.0
- WAR (Baseball-Reference): Nap Lajoie, 79.6

=== Pitching ===
- Wins: Bob Feller, 266
- Strikeouts: Bob Feller, 2,581
- Saves: Emmanuel Clase, 156
- ERA: Addie Joss, 1.89
- Losses: Mel Harder, 186
- Innings pitched: Bob Feller, 3,827.0
- Complete games: Bob Feller, 279
- Home runs: Bob Feller, 224
- Bases on balls: Bob Feller, 1,764
- Hits: Mel Harder, 3,706
- Hit by pitches: George Uhle, 95
- Strikeout-to-walk ratio: Shane Bieber, 5.096
- Strikeouts per nine innings pitched: Danny Salazar, 10.471
- WHIP: Addie Joss, 0.968
- WAR (Baseball-Reference): Bob Feller, 65.2

== See also ==
- Cleveland Guardians award winners and league leaders
