= Don Harvey (actor, born 1960) =

American actor

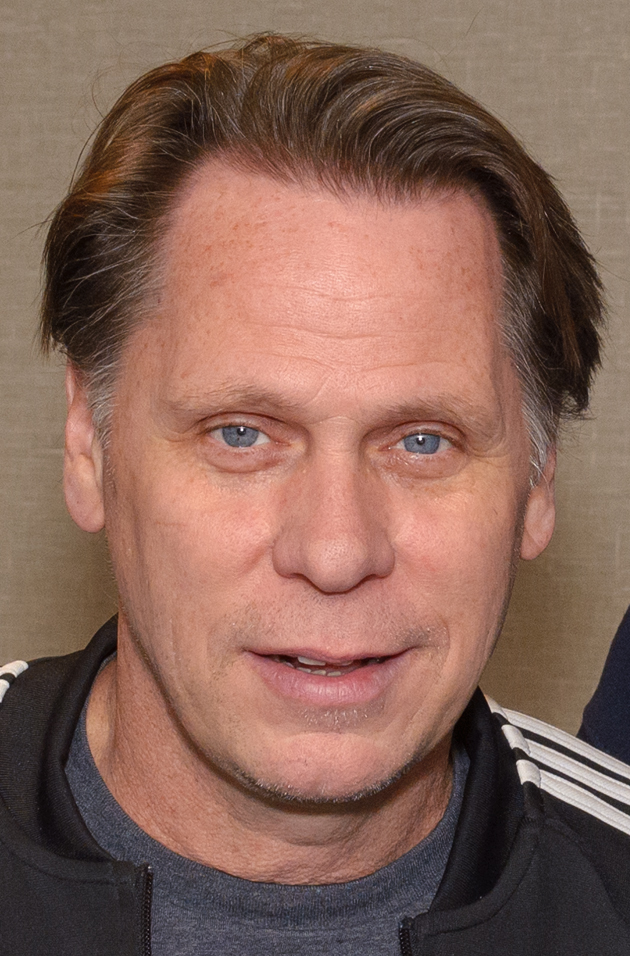
- Harvey in 2017
- Born: Donald Patrick Harvey II; May 31, 1960 (age 66); St. Clair Shores, Michigan, U.S.
- Education: University of Michigan (BA); Yale University (MFA)
- Occupation: Actor
- Years active: 1985–present

Donald Patrick Harvey II (born May 31, 1960) is an American actor.

== Early life ==
Harvey was born and raised in St. Clair Shores, Michigan, the sixth of eight children. He started acting while attending Lake Shore High School. Upon his 1982 graduation from the University of Michigan with a Bachelor of Arts degree, he attended the Yale School of Drama and received a Master of Fine Arts degree in acting in 1985. After graduation, he moved to New York City to pursue film, television and theatre work.

== Career ==
Harvey began appearing in films in the late 1980s and has appeared in over 70 feature films. One of his first roles was as a dirty cop in Brian de Palma's film The Untouchables. The following year, Harvey had one of his more prominent screen roles as "Black Sox" conspirator Swede Risberg in John Sayles' Eight Men Out (1988). Subsequently, Harvey had secondary roles in such high-profile productions as Casualties of War (1989) (his second Brian de Palma film), Die Hard 2 (1990), and The Thin Red Line (1998), in addition to the television film Better Off Dead (1993). His television work includes Miami Vice, NYPD Blue, The Pretender, The Deuce, Medium, Numbers, and We Own This City.

== Filmography ==
=== Film ===
Year	Title	Role	Notes
1987	Creepshow 2	Andy Kavanaugh	"Old Chief Wood'nhead" segment
1987	The Untouchables	Officer Preseuski	
1988	Eight Men Out	Swede Risberg	
1988	The Beast	Kaminski	
1988	After School	Nathan	
1989	Casualties of War	Corporal Thomas E. Clark	
1990	Die Hard 2	Garber	
1991	Hudson Hawk	Snickers	
1992	Prey of the Chameleon	Resnick	
1992	American Heart	Rainey	
1994	The Glass Shield	Deputy Jack Bono	
1994	Men of War	Nolan	
1995	Tank Girl	Sergeant Small	
1996	The Continued Adventures of Reptile Man	The Robber	Also known as Brittle Glory
1996	Last Dance	Doug	
1997	The Relic	Spota	
1997	Sparkler	Flint	
1998	The Thin Red Line	Sgt. Peter Becker	
1999	Life	Billy Bob	
1999	In Too Deep	Murphy	
1999	Out of the Cold	Nazi Leader	
2000	Batman Beyond: Return of the Joker	Charles Buntz / Chucko	Voice, direct-to-video
2001	Steal	Ned Rogers	Originally titled Riders
2002	Highway	Ronnie	
2002	Outside the Law	Kurt Lewis	
2004	She Hate Me	G. Gordon Liddy	
2004	Corn	Horace Rasmussen	Uncredited
2005	Swimmers	Russell	
2007	Anamorph	Killer	
2008	Frame of Mind	Agent Jenkins	
2009	Public Enemies	Customer at Steuben Club	
2013	Gangster Squad	Officer Funston	
2013	Holy Ghost People	Brother Sherman	
2013	Go for Sisters	Detective Mueller	
2014	Noah	Mean Uncle	
2014	The Prince	Riley	
2014	Taken 3	Detective Garcia	
2015	Vice	Kasansky	
2015	Secret in Their Eyes	Fierro	
2017	Small Town Crime	Randy	
2017	Gangster Land	Detective Landa	

=== Television ===
Year	Title	Role	Notes
1985	ABC Afterschool Specials	Kevin	Episode: "High School Narc"
1986	Another World	Aces	3 episodes
1988	Miami Vice	Alan Beaks	Episode: "Hell Hath No Fury"
1991	Mission of the Shark: The Saga of the U.S.S. Indianapolis	Kinderman	Television film
1993	Better Off Dead	Del Collins	Television film
1993	Crossroads	Cody	Episode: "The Last Roundup"
1995	Sawbones	Willy Knapp	Television film
1995	Saved by the Light	T.M.	Television film
1995	New York Undercover	Det. Hubert Flaherty	Episode: "Bad Girls"
1996	Face of Evil	Quinn Harris	Television film
1996	Crime of the Century	Lt. Gus Kramer	Television film
1996	Superman: The Animated Series	Gnaww	Voice, episode: "The Main Man"
1997	Walker, Texas Ranger	Benny Flynn	Episode: "Days Past"
1997	The Legend of Calamity Jane	Additional voices	13 episodes
1997	The Real Adventures of Jonny Quest	Milos Duncek	Voice, episode: "The Haunted Sonata"
1998	The Con	T.J.	Television film
1998	From the Earth to the Moon	Flight Director	Episode: "Mare Tranquilitatis"
1998–2000	The Pretender	Joey Melino, Mr. Job	2 episodes
1999	The King of Queens	Dirk	Episode: "Queasy Rider"
1999–2000	Batman Beyond	Vincent, Kidnapper	Voice, 2 episodes
2001	ER	Mr. Warshaw	Episode: "Never Say Never"
2003	NYPD Blue	Rick Rinaldi	Episode: "Maybe Baby"
2004	Crossing Jordan	Coach Vickers	Episode: "Most Likely"
2005	Justice League Unlimited	Charles Buntz / Chucko	Voice, episode: "The Once and Future Thing, Part Two: Time, Warped"
2005	Medium	Darrell Yellin	Episode: "Coded"
2008	Bernard and Doris	Security Guard	Television film
2009	Numbers	Pritchard	Episode: "Cover Me"
2011	Criminal Minds	Chief Barrows	Episode: "Today I Do"
2011–2012	Luck	The Flack	3 episodes
2012	Touch	Joey Deluca	Episode: "Tessellations"
2012	The Good Wife	Ryan Hood	Episode: "The Art of War"
2013	Justified	Patrick Massett	Episode: "Where's Waldo?"
2014	The After	Gut Shot	Pilot
2015	Stalker	Ken Buck	Episode: "Secrets and Lies"
2015	The Blacklist	Eli Matchett	Episode: "Eli Matchett (No. 72)"
2016	Blue Bloods	Det. Connell	Episode: "Back in the Day"
2016	The Night Of	Detective Tomalikis	Miniseries; 3 episodes
2016–2017	General Hospital	Tom Baker	Recurring role; 19 episodes
2017	The Last Tycoon	Rupert Vajna	4 episodes
2017–2019	The Deuce	Danny Flanagan	14 episodes
2018	The Truth About the Harry Quebert Affair	Bobbo Quinn	10 episodes
2018–2020	Better Call Saul	Jeff (Note: He was eventually replaced by Pat Healy for this role due to Harvey's previous commitments)	2 episodes
2019	Lethal Weapon	Tom Kessler	Episode: "There Will Be Bud"
2019	Chambers	Johnny "Bail Bonds"`	3 episodes
2019	Yellowstone	Jerry Hayes	Episode: "Only Devils Left"
2022	Pam & Tommy	Anthony Pellicano	Miniseries; 2 episodes
2022	We Own This City	John Sieracki	Miniseries; 6 episodes
2025	Black Rabbit	Matt	Miniseries; 7 episodes
