= Mike Napoli =

American baseball player & coach (born 1981)

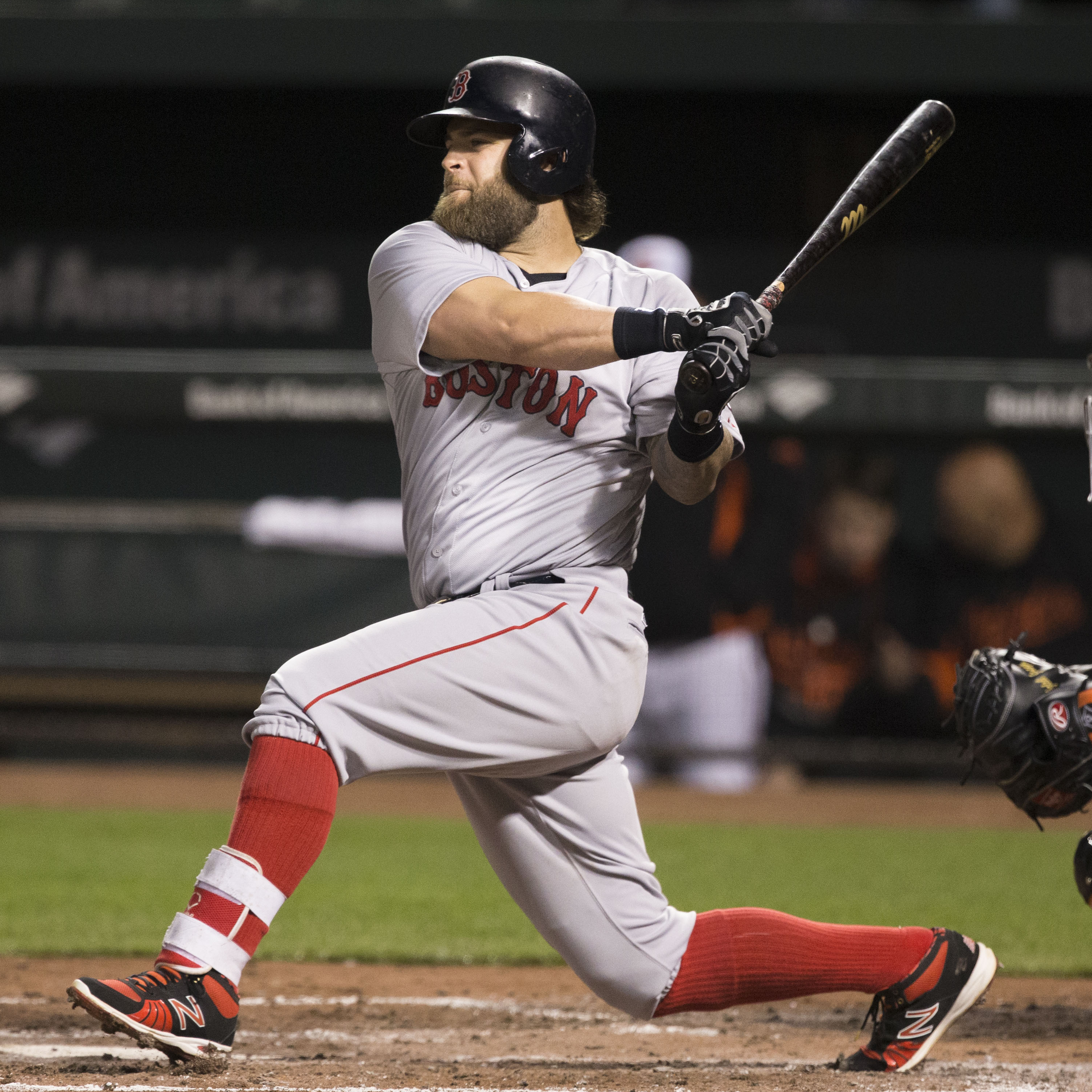
- Napoli with the Boston Red Sox in 2015

Cincinnati Reds – No. 75
- First baseman / Catcher / Coach
- Born: October 31, 1981 (age 45); Hollywood, Florida, U.S.
- Batted: Right Threw: Right

MLB debut
- May 4, 2006, for the Los Angeles Angels of Anaheim

Last MLB appearance
- September 14, 2017, for the Texas Rangers

MLB statistics
- Batting average: .246
- Home runs: 267
- Runs batted in: 744
- Stats at Baseball Reference

Teams
- As player: Los Angeles Angels of Anaheim (2006–2010); Texas Rangers (2011–2012); Boston Red Sox (2013–2015); Texas Rangers (2015); Cleveland Indians (2016); Texas Rangers (2017); As coach: Chicago Cubs (2020–2024); Cincinnati Reds (2025–present)

Career highlights and awards
- All-Star (2012); World Series champion (2013)

Michael Anthony Napoli (born October 31, 1981) is an American former professional baseball first baseman and catcher who is currently serving as the assistant bench coach for the Cincinnati Reds of Major League Baseball (MLB).

He was selected in the 17th round (500th overall) of the 2000 Major League Baseball draft, then played in MLB for the Los Angeles Angels of Anaheim, Texas Rangers, Boston Red Sox, and Cleveland Indians. Napoli was primarily a catcher from 2005 to 2012, before spending the remainder of his career as a first baseman and designated hitter. He holds the all-time single-season records for most strikeouts by both a Red Sox player and an Indians player. In 2009 he led all American League catchers in errors, and in 2016 he led all AL first basemen in errors.

== Early life ==
Born in Hollywood, Florida, Napoli attended Charles W. Flanagan High School in Pembroke Pines, Florida. He signed a letter of intent to play college baseball for Louisiana State, but instead signed with the Anaheim Angels after being selected in the 17th round (500th overall) of the 2000 Major League Baseball draft.

== Minor league career ==
Napoli began his professional career with the rookie-level Butte Copper Kings, batting .231, but sat out most of the year after suffering a lower back strain. He returned in 2001 with the High-A Rancho Cucamonga Quakes, batting .200, before transferring to Single-A Cedar Rapids, where he batted .232. In 2002, he returned to Cedar Rapids, hitting .251 with 10 home runs and 50 runs batted in (RBIs) and 104 strikeouts in 362 at bats as the Kernels' primary designated hitter. He also started at catcher for 37 games. After being transferred to Rancho Cucamonga in 2003, he only played 47 games after injuring his right shoulder.

In 2004, he hit .282 with 29 home runs and 118 RBI, ranking seventh in RBIs and ninth in walks in all of the minor leagues, with 166 strikeouts (leading the California League) in 482 at bats. In 2005, he was promoted to Double-A Arkansas, batting .237 with 140 strikeouts (3rd in the Texas League) in 439 at bats and 14 errors at catcher in 109 games, and finishing second in the league in extra-base hits and fifth in runs scored.

Napoli played for the Águilas Cibaeñas of Santiago in the Dominican Republic during the winters of 2004 and 2005.

== Major League career ==
=== Los Angeles Angels of Anaheim ===
==== 2006 ====
Napoli made his Major League Baseball debut on May 4, 2006, against the Detroit Tigers in Comerica Park, and hit a home run in his first Major League at-bat off starting pitcher Justin Verlander. Eventually, Napoli worked his way to become the Angels' regular starting catcher. In 2006, Napoli hit .228 with 16 home runs in 268 at-bats. He was fourth among AL catchers in errors, with eight, in 96 games at catcher.

==== 2007 ====
Napoli began 2007 as the Opening Day starting catcher, and split time with José Molina through the first half of the season. The second half of the season was injury-marred for Napoli, as he suffered a sprained ankle on a game-winning play at the plate during the final game before the All-Star break, causing him to miss 12 games. He then suffered a strained hamstring only five games after returning, causing him to miss all of August. For the season, Napoli hit .247 with 10 home runs, appearing in only 75 games. He was fifth among AL catchers in errors, with seven.

==== 2008 ====
Napoli again was the Angels' Opening Day starter at catcher, and after recovering from his 2007 injuries, began the 2008 season by hitting six home runs in April. Napoli continued to share time behind the plate with Jeff Mathis, who had assumed the back-up duties after the Angels' trade of Molina during the 2007 season. Napoli again was injured in July, causing him to miss 28 games with shoulder issues. However, after recovering from the injury, Napoli led all of Major League Baseball with a .457 batting average in the month of September. For the season, Napoli tallied a .273 batting average and 20 home runs, both career highs, and a .960 OPS. On defense, he was fifth in the AL in passed balls, with seven. The Angels won the 2008 American League West Division championship, with a 100–62 record.

During Game 3 of the 2008 American League Division Series against the Boston Red Sox, with the Red Sox holding a 2–0 series lead, Napoli hit two home runs against Red Sox starting pitcher Josh Beckett, helping extend the game into extra innings. He then singled and scored the game-winning run in the 11th inning, helping the Angels avoid playoff elimination.

==== 2009 ====
Napoli continued to compete with Jeff Mathis for the leading catching spot in 2009. He also started 18 games at designated hitter while teammate Vladimir Guerrero was injured. Napoli set or matched career highs in games played (114), at bats (382), runs scored (60), hits (104), doubles (22), and RBIs (56). He also finished the season with a .272 batting average and hit 20 home runs for the second season in a row. On defense, he led AL catchers in errors, with eight, and allowed 74 stolen bases (fifth-most in the AL).

==== 2010 ====
In 2010, the Angels reduced Napoli's playing time at DH after signing Japanese slugger Hideki Matsui. Napoli went into spring training with a bigger glove and worked on fundamentals in hopes of getting more playing time as a catcher.

Napoli wound up playing the majority of the 2010 season at first base. He made his first major league start at first base on May 30, after regular first baseman Kendrys Morales broke his lower leg in a walk-off celebration. With the loss of Morales for the season, and the return of fellow catcher Jeff Mathis from the disabled list, Napoli started 70 games at first base, posting a .989 fielding percentage, as he was fifth in the AL with six errors. Napoli set career highs in several categories, most notably home runs (26). He finished seventh in the AL in strikeouts (137), in 453 at bats. Napoli also became the Angels' all-time leader in home runs by a catcher during the 2010 season.

=== Texas Rangers ===
==== 2011 ====
On January 21, Napoli was traded to the Toronto Blue Jays along with outfielder Juan Rivera in exchange for outfielder Vernon Wells. Four days later, he was traded by the Blue Jays to the Texas Rangers in exchange for pitcher Frank Francisco.

On May 29, Napoli was involved in a controversial game-ending play at home plate in the ninth inning in a game against the Kansas City Royals. Napoli was at first and Elvis Andrus was up against Joakim Soria. Andrus hit a shot past Eric Hosmer that got into right field. Napoli was sent home by the third-base coach. Hosmer threw the ball to the plate. Brayan Pena tagged Napoli on the upper shoulder, but Napoli was called safe by the home-plate umpire, giving the Rangers a walk-off win. Pena was enraged and arguing with the umpires with manager Ned Yost. Replays showed that Pena did not block the plate, but tagged Napoli, who got his feet in just before the tag.

In Napoli's first season with the Rangers, he batted .320 with 30 home runs (10th in the American League) and 75 RBIs, while improving his defense (throwing out 36% of base-stealers; fourth-best in the league). He had a .631 slugging percentage in 369 at bats.

In Game 5 of the 2011 World Series, Napoli hit a two-run double in the bottom of the eighth inning to give the Rangers a 4–2 lead. The Rangers held on to win and take a 3-games-to-2 lead in the series, but eventually lost the World Series Championship to the St. Louis Cardinals in seven games.

==== 2012 ====
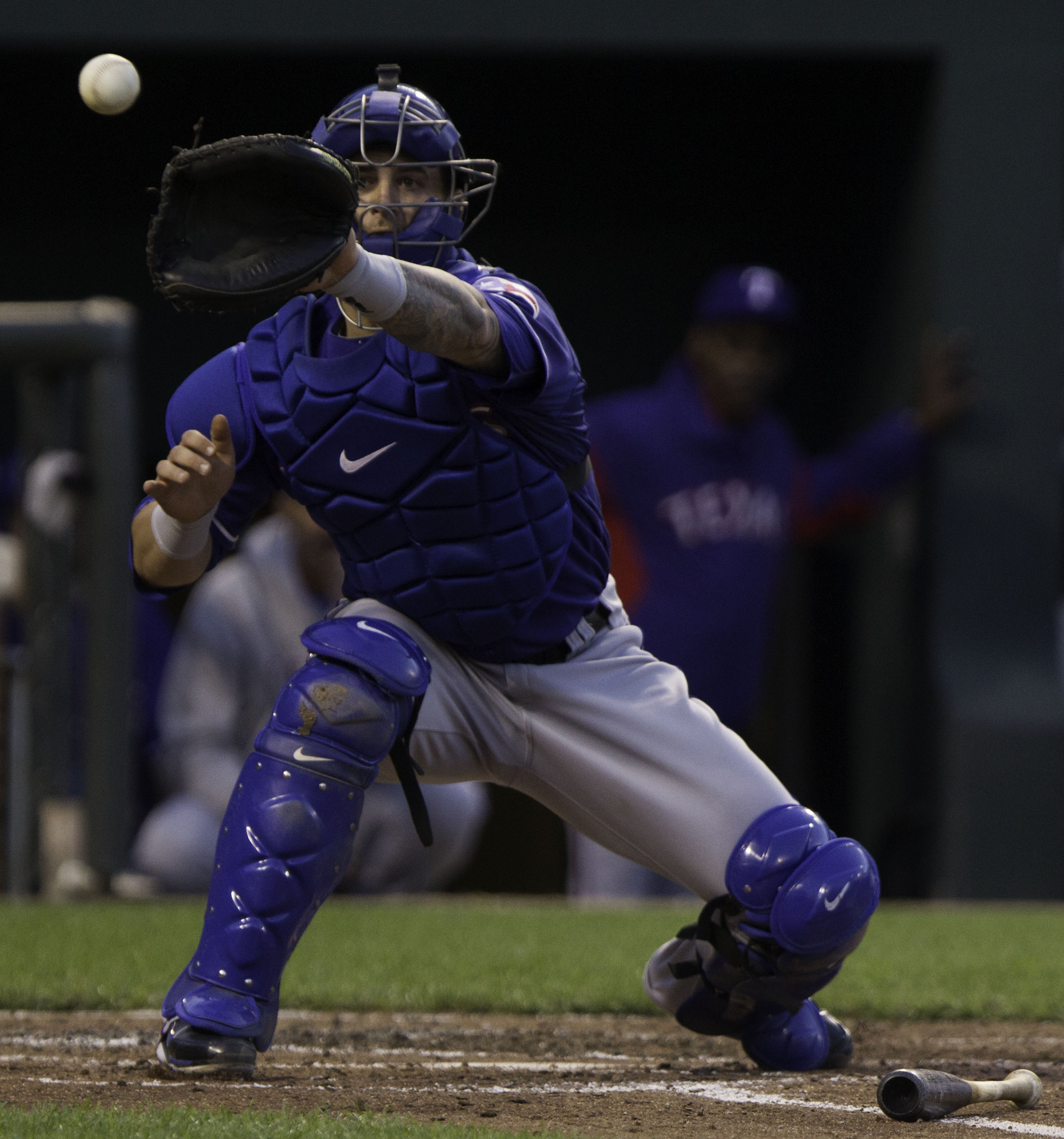
Napoli playing as a catcher for the Texas Rangers in 2012

On February 11, 2012, Napoli signed a one-year, $9.4 million deal to avoid arbitration with the Rangers. Napoli filed for $11.5 million, but the Rangers countered with $8.3 million. He received the second highest raise for anyone in their third or fourth time through the arbitration process, with Prince Fielder taking the top spot. In 2012 he batted .227, and finished fifth in the AL in passed balls, with eight. Napoli became a free agent after the season.

=== Boston Red Sox ===
On December 3, 2012, Napoli agreed to a three-year, $39 million deal with the Boston Red Sox, pending a physical examination. Following a six-week period during which the status of the deal was in question after his physical showed signs of a hip issue, Napoli came to terms with the Red Sox on a one-year, $5 million deal with incentives that could make the deal worth $13 million. The incentives were to stay on the active roster for at least 165 days (which Napoli achieved), or get up to 625 plate appearances with at least 120 days on the roster.

==== 2013 ====
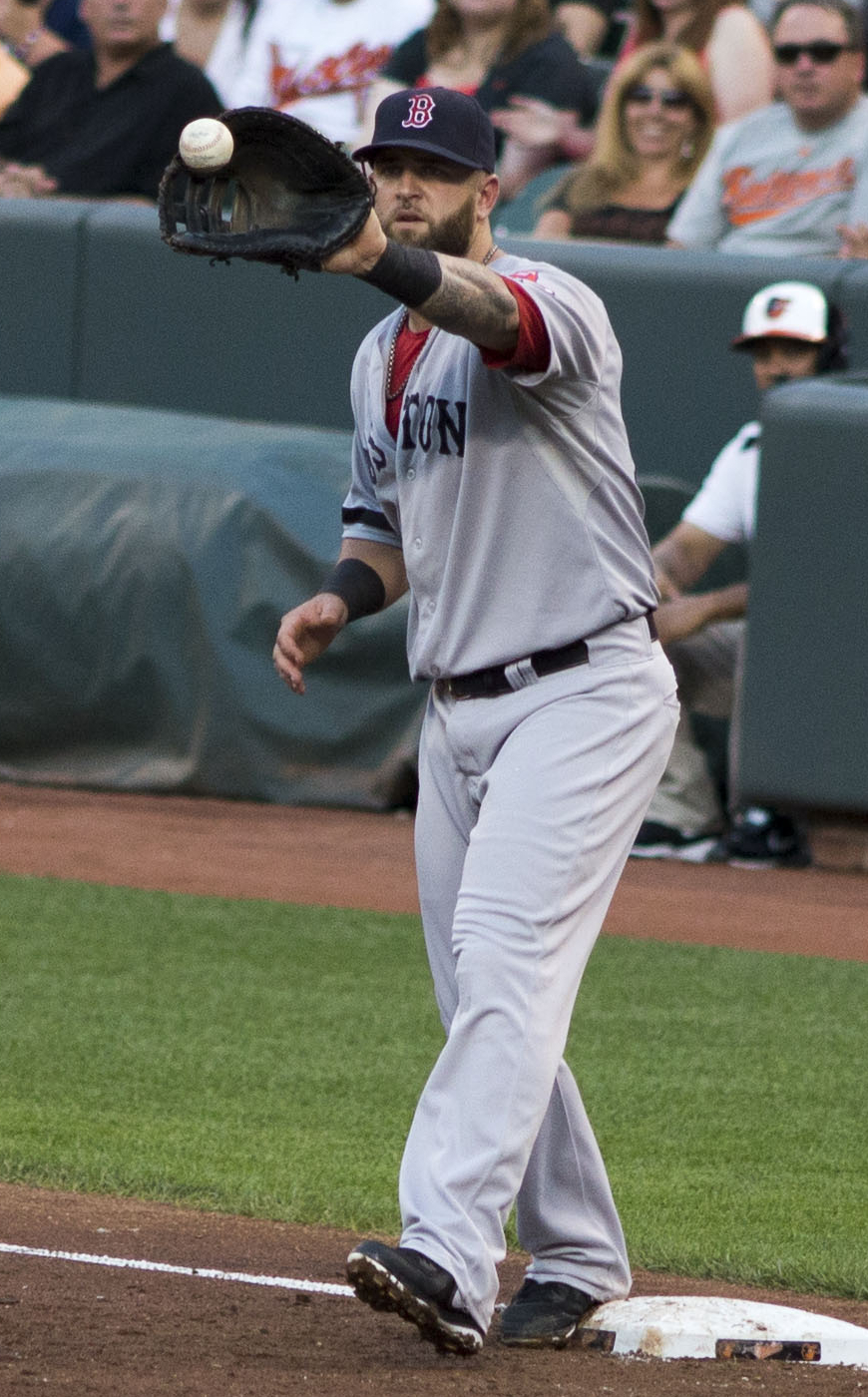
Napoli playing as a first baseman for the Boston Red Sox in 2013

On April 22, 2013, Napoli hit his fourth career grand slam in a 9–6 win over the Oakland Athletics. On September 15, 2013, Napoli struck out for the 178th time of the season, passing Mark Bellhorn to become the new Red Sox franchise leader in strikeouts in a season. Upon his strikeout, Napoli threw his bat and helmet in frustration and argued with home plate umpire Ron Kulpa and was ejected for the first time in his Major League career. For the 2013 season, Napoli batted .259 with 23 home runs, 92 RBI, and struck out 187 times, fourth-most in the AL and the most ever by a Red Sox player.

In Game 3 of the 2013 ALCS against the Detroit Tigers, Napoli hit a solo home run off Verlander for the game's only run in a 1-0 Boston win.

Although Napoli played more games at catcher than at any other position in each of his seasons with the Angels and Rangers, he did not catch a single game for the Red Sox in 2013, playing almost entirely at first base, with a few games as a designated hitter. During Games 3, 4, and 5 of the 2013 World Series, with the DH rule not in effect per National League rules, regular DH David Ortiz played first base and Napoli was taken out of the lineup rather than moved to catcher. After six games against the St. Louis Cardinals, Napoli received his first career championship ring as the Red Sox won their eighth World Series.

Napoli agreed to re-sign with the Red Sox on a two-year deal worth $32 million on December 6, 2013.

==== 2014 ====
During 2014, Napoli dealt with injuries throughout the season. He broke his finger in an early season game vs the Chicago White Sox. Napoli returned, but finger problems and sleep apnea took him out of the lineup for much of the latter part of the season. Napoli’s eight errors were fifth in the AL among first basemen.

==== 2015 ====
Napoli struggled in 98 games for the Red Sox in 2015, hitting .207 with 99 strikeouts, 13 home runs, and 40 RBIs. On defense, he was third among AL first basemen in errors, with seven.

=== Second run with the Texas Rangers ===
On August 7, 2015, the Texas Rangers acquired Napoli from the Red Sox for a player to be named later or cash considerations. Manager Jeff Banister used Napoli against left-handed pitching and played him in left field. He played 35 games for the Rangers in 2015, making 91 plate appearances and batting .295 with five home runs, 10 RBI and a .513 SLG. Between the two teams, in 2015 he batted .224.

=== Cleveland Indians ===
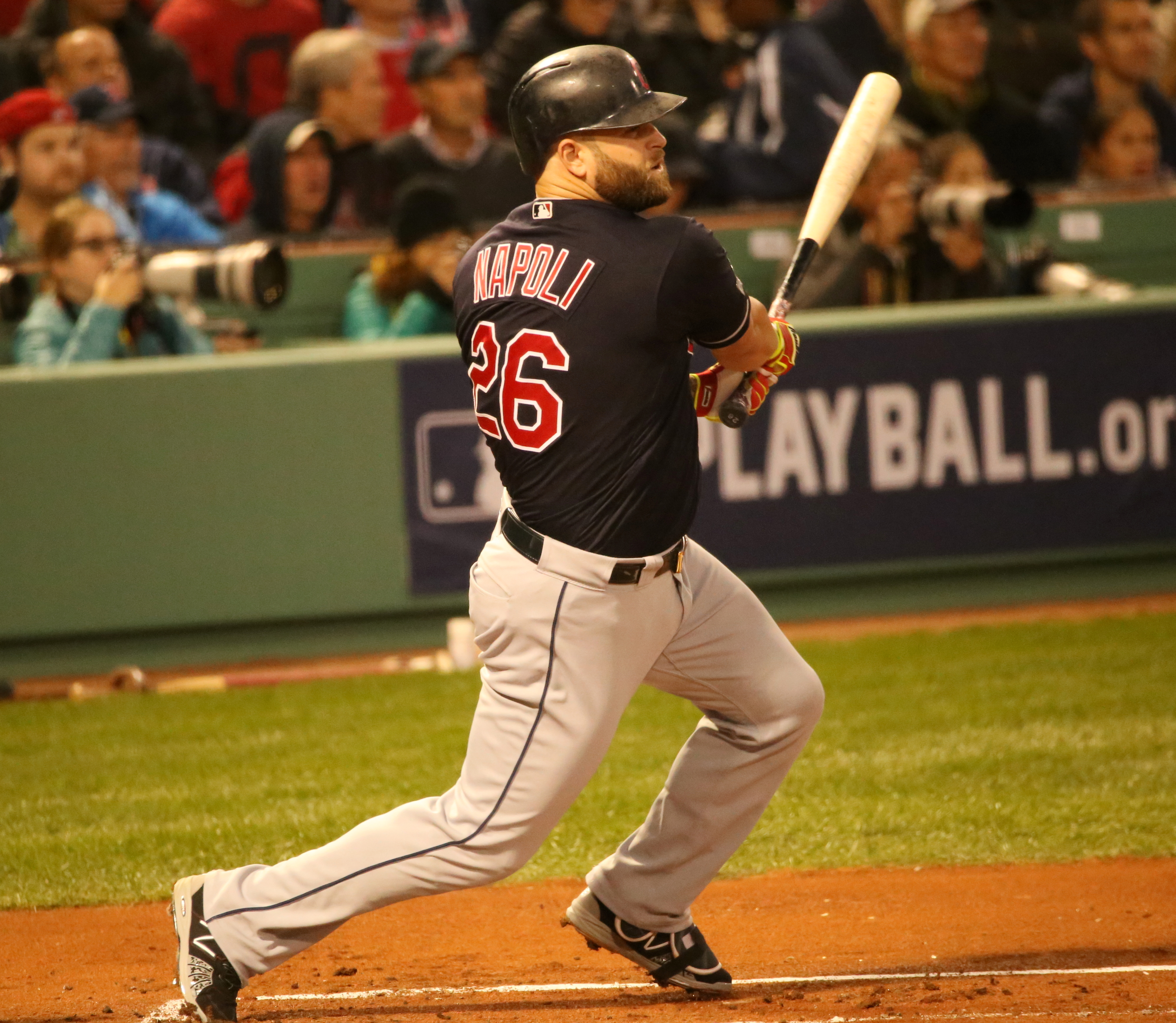
Napoli with the Indians in 2016

On January 5, 2016, Napoli signed a one-year, $7 million contract with the Cleveland Indians. During the season, Streetsboro, Ohio resident Nate Crowe coined the popular phrase "Party at Napoli's", creating a t-shirt with the slogan that was gifted to Napoli. Upon wearing the shirt during a post-game interview, demand for the shirts was high. Subsequent sales of the shirt raised over $200,000 for the Cleveland Clinic Children's Hospital. Napoli batted .239 while setting career highs with 34 home runs and 101 RBIs. He finished second in the AL in strikeouts, with 194—the most strikeouts ever, by an Indians player. Napoli led all AL first basemen in errors, with 13, in 98 games at first base.

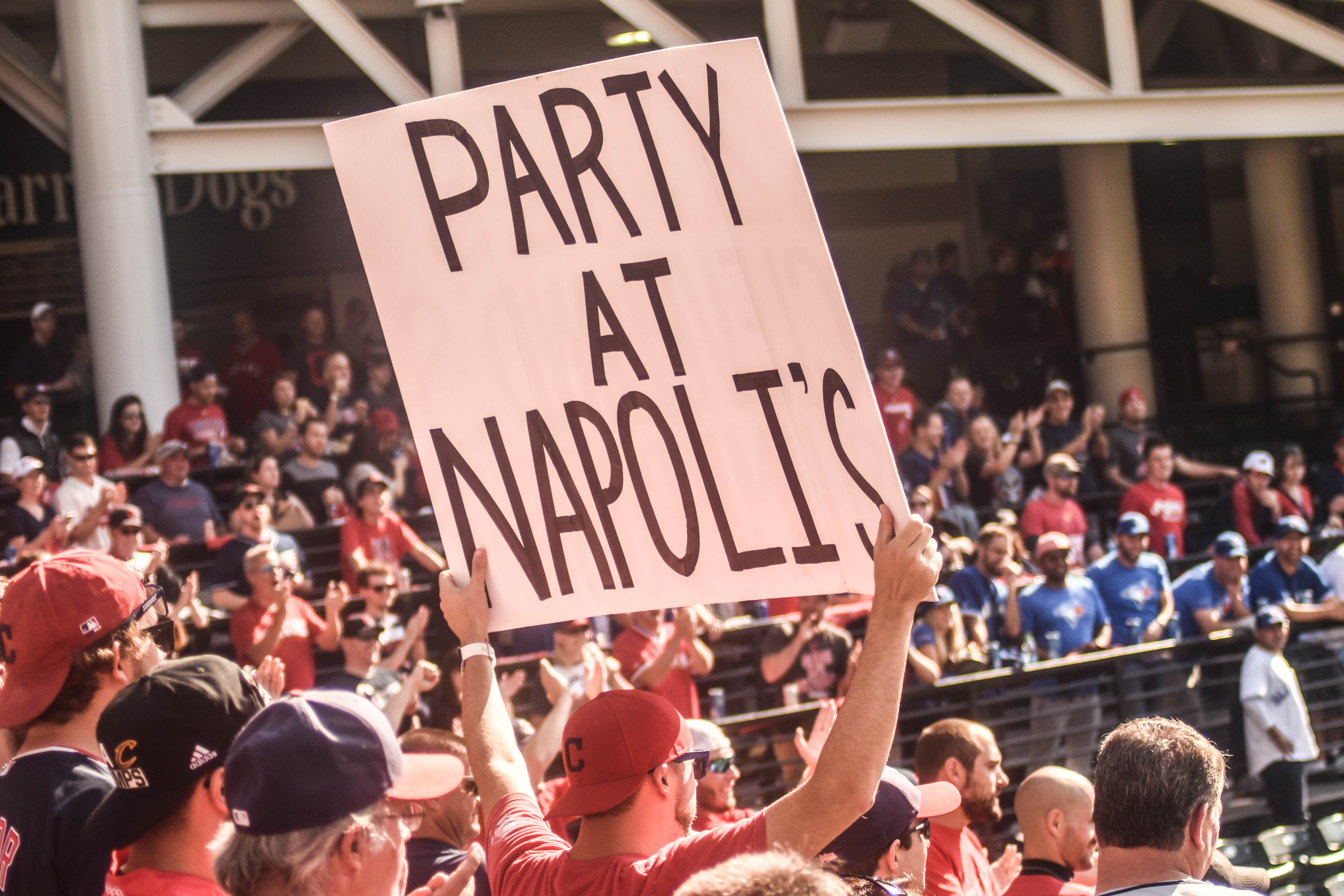
A double-sided sign, the visible side of which states "Party at Napoli's"

In game three of the 2016 American League Championship Series, Napoli's home run off Blue Jays starting pitcher Marcus Stroman made him the fifth player to hit a postseason home run for four different teams, joining Ron Gant, John Olerud, Reggie Sanders, and Russell Martin.

=== Third run with the Texas Rangers ===
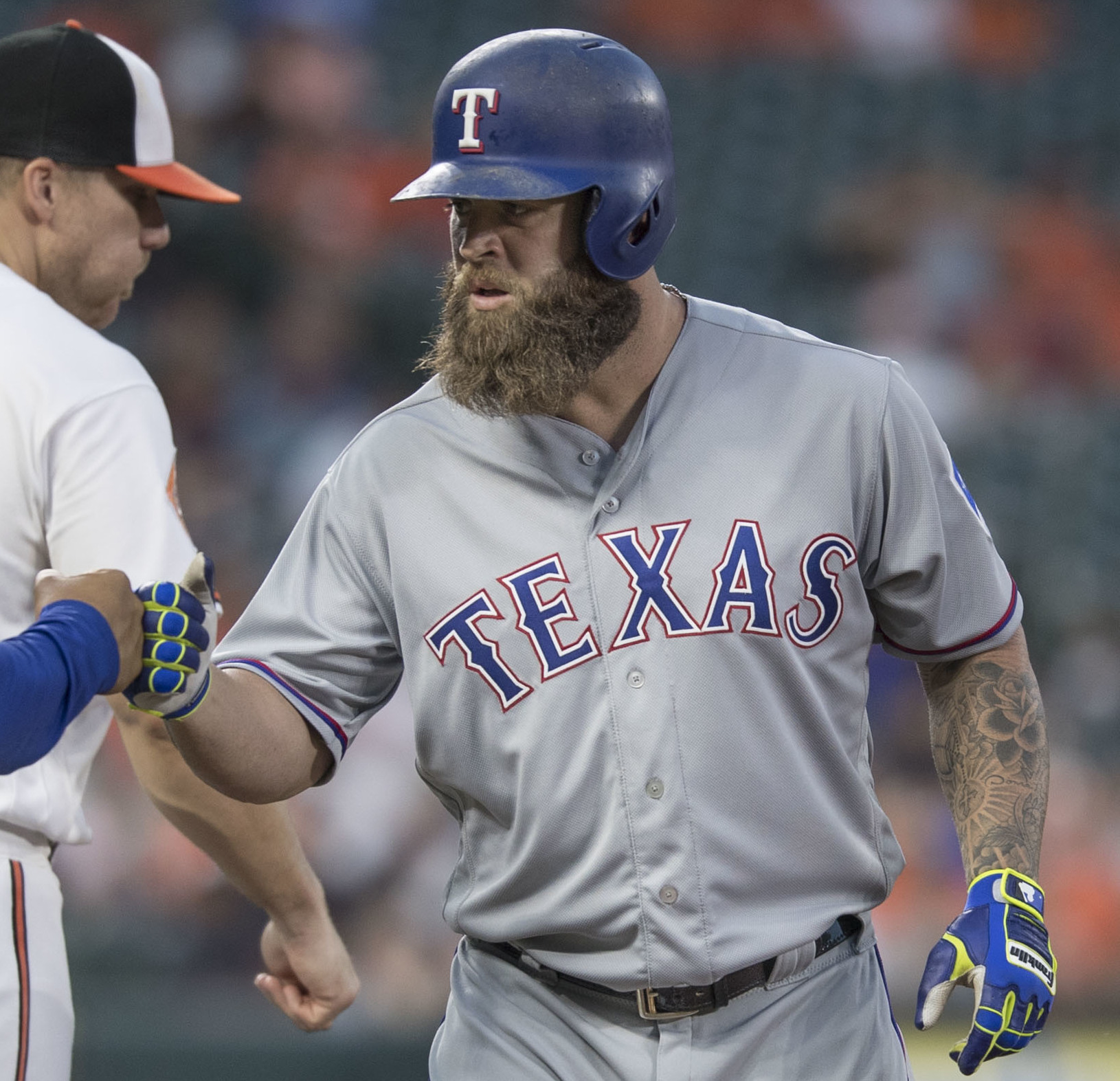
Napoli during his third stint with the Texas Rangers in 2017

On February 16, 2017, the Rangers announced Napoli was signed to a one-year contract with a club option for 2018. In 2017 he batted .193 with 29 home runs and 66 RBIs.

The Rangers declined Napoli's 2018 option on November 6, 2017, making him a free agent.

=== Cleveland Indians (second stint) ===
Napoli signed a minor league contract with the Cleveland Indians on February 28, 2018. The deal included an invitation to the Indians' 2018 spring training camp. He was released on March 22 in a procedural move to allow the Indians to avoid having to pay him a $100,000 retention bonus. Napoli was re-signed by the Indians to a minor league contract on March 23. On April 19, Napoli announced that he would be out for the remainder 2018 season due to a torn ACL and meniscus. This occurred during a minor league game with the Columbus Clippers, the Triple-A affiliate of the Indians. He batted .042 for Columbus. Napoli elected free agency following the season on November 2.

Napoli announced his retirement from professional baseball on December 8, 2018.

== Coaching career ==
=== Chicago Cubs ===
On December 9, 2019, Napoli was hired by the Chicago Cubs as their quality assurance coach. He was promoted to the role of first base coach prior to the 2022 season. Following the 2024 season, the Cubs announced they were parting ways with Napoli.

=== Cincinnati Reds ===
On November 23, 2024, the Cincinnati Reds hired Napoli as their Major League Staff Assistant. On November 3, 2025, Napoli was promoted to the role of assistant bench coach.

== See also ==
- List of players with a home run in first major league at bat
- List of Cleveland Indians team records
- List of Boston Red Sox team records
