= Brandon Mill =

- Brandon Mill (Restored and Converted to The West Village Lofts at Brandon Mill)
- U.S. National Register of Historic Places
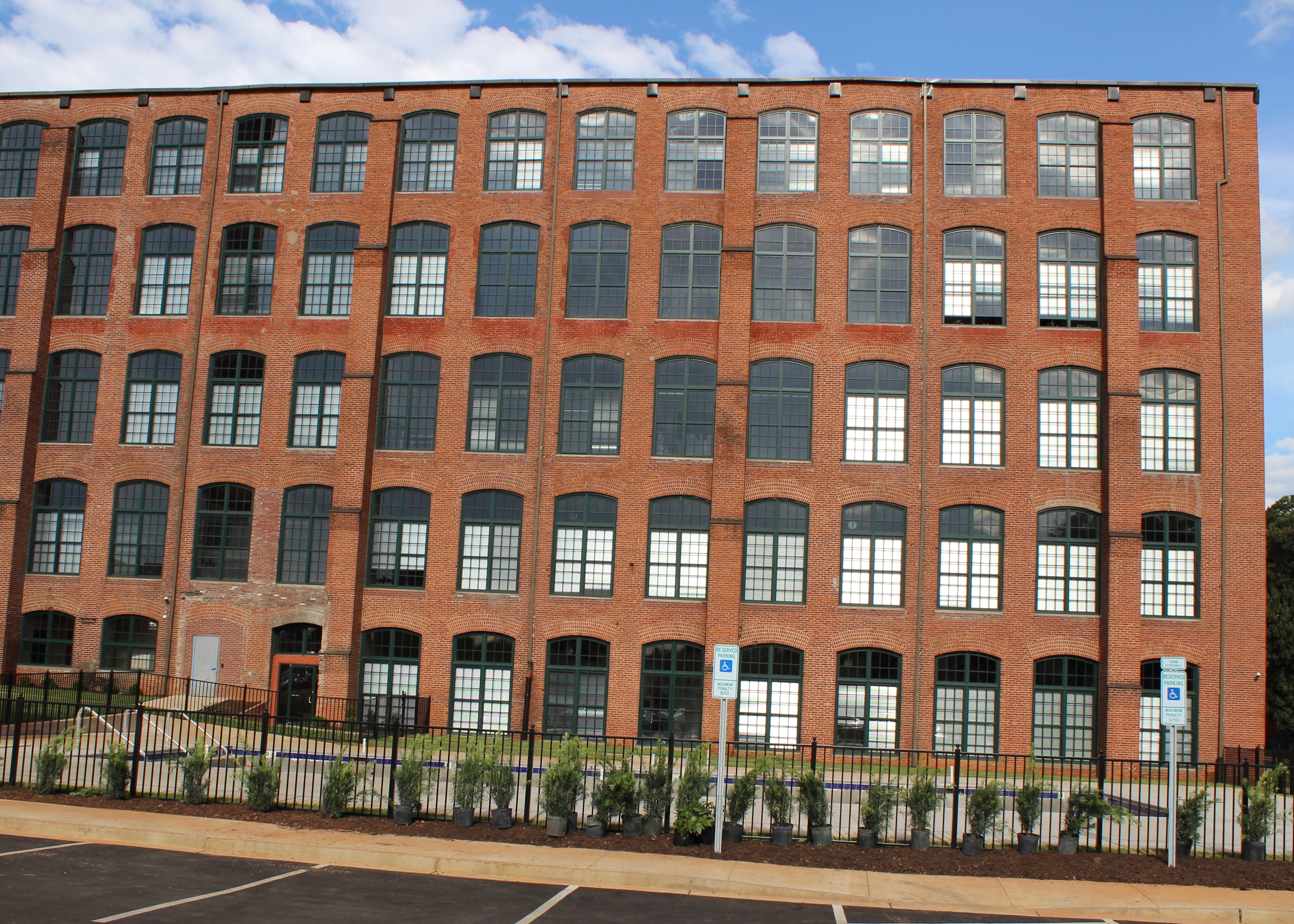
- Brandon Mill was converted to lofts, 2019.

- Location within South Carolina Location within the United States
- Location: 25 Draper Street, Greenville County, South Carolina
- Coordinates: 34°50′39″N 82°25′53″W
- NRHP reference No.: 14000317
- Added to NRHP: September 3, 2014

Brandon Mill, now the West Village Lofts, is a historic textile mill complex, situated just west of the city of Greenville, Greenville County, South Carolina. The mill was built during the early decades of the 20th century and is one example of the mills in the Greenville "Textile Crescent" that became central to the economic development of the South Carolina upstate during this period. The complex was listed on the National Register of Historic Places in 2014, and the main mill has been converted into loft apartments.

== Building history ==
The original building was planned in 1899 by J. Irving Westervelt (1862-1939), designed by Lockwood, Greene & Company of Providence, Rhode Island, and built by local construction engineer Jacob W. Cagle (1832-1910). Completed in January 1901, the mill was named Brandon, supposedly for a hamlet near Belfast that produced textiles. Employees were largely recruited from Appalachia and other rural areas in the southeastern United States. In five years, the mill expanded from 16,000 to 86,000 spindles, the work force from 150 to 420 employees, and the mill village from 66 to 420 homes. By 1918 the company sponsored a school, church, nursery, and community house with a dining room, library, showers, and nurse's station.

Baseball played by teams of mill employees became a popular sport during the first two decades of the century; and mill owners competed for the best players, hoping thereby to encourage employee pride and to control the leisure time of their "operatives" with a disciplined pastime. The most famous of the mill team players was Shoeless Joe Jackson (1888-1951), who began his career at Brandon Mill before eventually becoming one of professional baseball's greatest hitters.

Meeting with financial reverses, Brandon Mill went into receivership by 1913; and August W. Smith of Spartanburg became its second president. In 1919, the New York firm of Woodward, Baldwin & Co. gained a controlling interest, though local management remained unchanged. In the 1920s, the mill was substantially expanded under the direction of Joseph E. Sirrine (1872-1947), arguably the most prominent engineer in the region.

Even before the onset of the Great Depression, the textile industry had declined; and in an attempt to increase productivity, mill operators instituted the "stretch-out," a requirement that workers manage more machines. In March 1929, 1,200 workers struck Brandon Mill. Though owners and workers reached a compromise in May, the textile economy continued to deteriorate. In order to keep the mill open through the 1930s, August Smith cut hours and pay rather than eliminate jobs—a strategy that produced substantial loyalty to the mill during the general textile strike of 1934 when workers reportedly met organizers for the United Textile Workers of America with "picker sticks" and rifles and ordered them to keep going.

During World War II, Brandon Mill prospered with government orders for duck cloth, medical gauze, and uniform twill fabric. In December 1946, Abney Mills bought the assets of Brandon Corporation and began selling the mill village houses. Although textile mills remained reasonably prosperous during the 1950s and '60s, textile manufacturers began offshoring—moving operations outside the United States to countries where labor costs were cheaper. Brandon Mill reduced its workforce in 1969, and the mill closed in 1977.

The main building was first sold for use as a warehouse, then in 2001 to Focus Golf to serve as a distribution center for Dunlop Sport. In 2014 real estate developer Pace Burt purchased the property and converted the main building into loft apartments. For tax purposes, Burt applied for National Register status, which was granted in September. In 2015 Burt donated one building in the complex to the Greenville Center for Creative Arts. The loft apartments opened for occupancy in 2016.
