= Buck Weaver =

American baseball player (1890–1956)

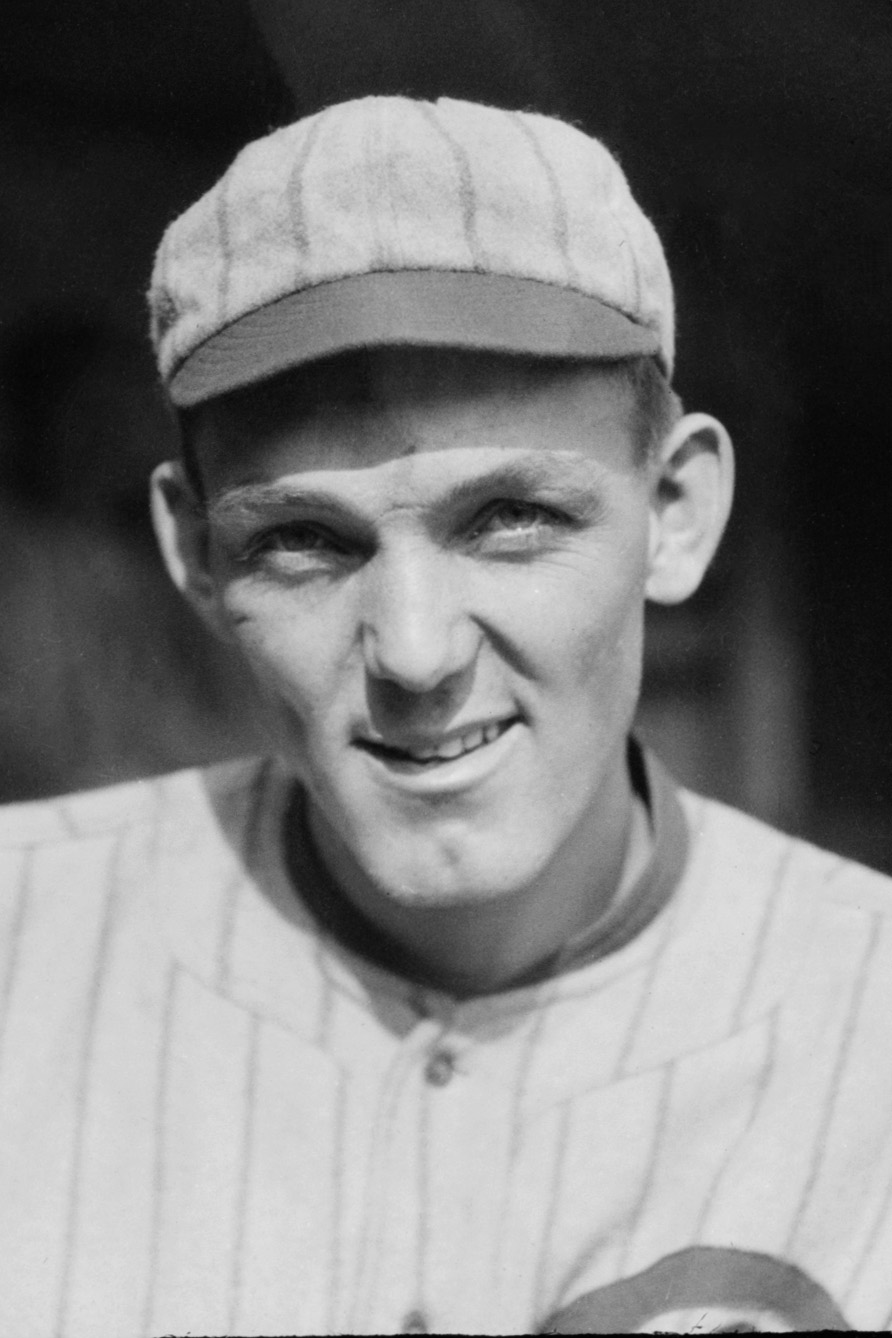
- Weaver in 1917
- Shortstop / Third baseman
- Born: August 18, 1890; Pottstown, Pennsylvania, U.S.
- Died: January 31, 1956 (aged 65); Chicago, Illinois, U.S.
- Batted: Switch Threw: Right

MLB debut
- April 11, 1912, for the Chicago White Sox

Last MLB appearance
- September 27, 1920, for the Chicago White Sox

MLB statistics
- Batting average: .272
- Home runs: 21
- Runs batted in: 421
- Stats at Baseball Reference

Teams
- Chicago White Sox (1912–1920)

Career highlights and awards
- World Series champion (1917)

George Daniel "Buck" Weaver (August 18, 1890 – January 31, 1956) was an American shortstop and third baseman. He played in Major League Baseball (MLB) for the Chicago White Sox. Weaver played for the 1917 World Series champion White Sox, then was one of the eight players banned from the Major Leagues for his connection to the 1919 Black Sox Scandal.

== Baseball career ==
Weaver was born in Pottstown, Pennsylvania, to Daniel Weaver and Susan Snell and began his major league career on April 11, 1912, as a shortstop for the White Sox. Weaver switched to third base in 1917 after Swede Risberg joined the team.

An excellent fielder, Weaver was known as the only third baseman in the league against whom Ty Cobb would not bunt. He led the majors in sacrifice hits in 1915 and 1916.

In the famous 1919 World Series, Weaver batted .324, tallying 11 hits but did not notch an RBI.

After the Series was over, many suspicious reporters made allusions to a possible fix. However some sportswriters praised Weaver for his efforts all along during the World Series. Ross Tenney of the Cincinnati Post wrote:

Though they are hopeless and heartless, the White Sox have a hero. He is George Weaver, who plays and fights at third base. Day after day Weaver has done his work and smiled. In spite of the certain fate that closed about the hopes of the Sox, Weaver smiled and scrapped. One by one his mates gave up. Weaver continued to grin and fought harder….Weaver's smile never faded. His spirit never waned….The Reds have beaten the spirit out of the Sox all but Weaver. Buck's spirit is untouched. He was ready to die fighting. Buck is Chicago's one big hero; long may he fight and smile.

Despite this, Weaver was banned by Commissioner Kenesaw Mountain Landis for having knowledge of the fix and failing to tell team officials.

== Reinstatement attempts ==
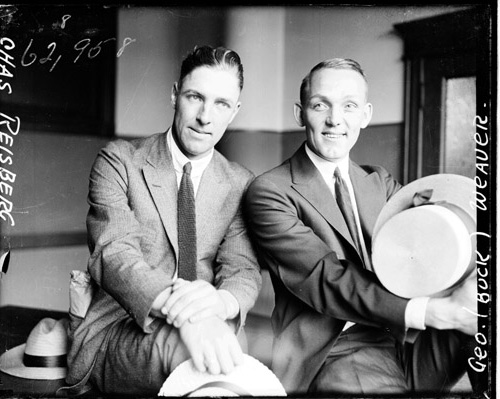
Weaver (right) and Swede Risberg at the 1921 trial

Weaver successfully sued White Sox owner Charles Comiskey for his 1921 salary. When Shoeless Joe Jackson did the same, the jury voted 11–1 in favor of Jackson. However, the judge set aside the jury verdict after Comiskey produced Jackson's grand jury testimony about the fix. Despite this success, however, Comiskey made no attempt to offer the confessions as evidence to obtain a similar ruling against Weaver.

For the rest of his life, Weaver applied at least six times for reinstatement to baseball. The first time was on January 13, 1922, when Weaver unsuccessfully applied for reinstatement, which was rejected by Landis. One notable attempt to get reinstated came in 1927 in the wake of Tris Speaker/Ty Cobb betting scandal. Once again, Landis rejected it, with Landis telling a group of Weaver supporters that his presence at the meetings with the gamblers was sufficient to bar him.

After this attempt failed, Weaver returned to Chicago and decided to play in the minor leagues again. Later in life, Weaver contacted a New York City attorney who vowed to get him reinstated. Weaver sent his legal papers and correspondence to New York; however, they were never returned. To this day, baseball historians have been unable to find Weaver's legal files.

In 1953, Weaver applied for reinstatement one last time to Commissioner Ford Frick, which was ignored. The letter Weaver wrote to Frick is prominently displayed in Cooperstown’s Baseball Hall of Fame and Museum. Weaver died from a heart attack on January 31, 1956, at the age of 65.

On May 13, 2025, Commissioner Rob Manfred reinstated Weaver and other deceased players from the ineligible list, including Pete Rose and Shoeless Joe Jackson.

== Legacy ==
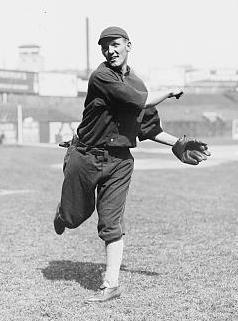
Weaver in 1913

Many parts of the story portrayed in the 1988 movie Eight Men Out are told from Buck Weaver's point of view, with Weaver being played by John Cusack. Harry Stein also used Weaver as a co-narrator in his critically acclaimed Black Sox novel Hoopla (1983), where Stein's Weaver reiterates that his loyalty to his teammates compelled him not to inform baseball authorities about the Series fix.

With the 2005 World Series set to begin and the White Sox about to capture their first championship since 1917, Chicago Tribune columnist Mike Downey implored Commissioner Bud Selig to rescind Weaver's ban. His column of October 20, 2005, cited catcher Ray Schalk's condemnation of "the seven" Sox in on the fix, not eight. Weaver's niece, Pat Anderson, told Downey: "You can't understand why someone else would be so obtuse. Some of these commissioners, it's like they put a brown paper bag over their heads."

Another niece, Margarie H. (Cook) Follett, attended the 2003 All-Star Game, held that year by the White Sox at U.S. Cellular Field, to personally appeal to Commissioner Bud Selig for her uncle's reinstatement. The Tribune reported a quote from Weaver: "There are murderers who serve a sentence and then get out. I got life."

== See also ==
- List of Chicago White Sox team records
- List of Major League Baseball career stolen bases leaders
- List of people banned from Major League Baseball
