= Shoeless Joe Jackson =

American baseball player (1887–1951)

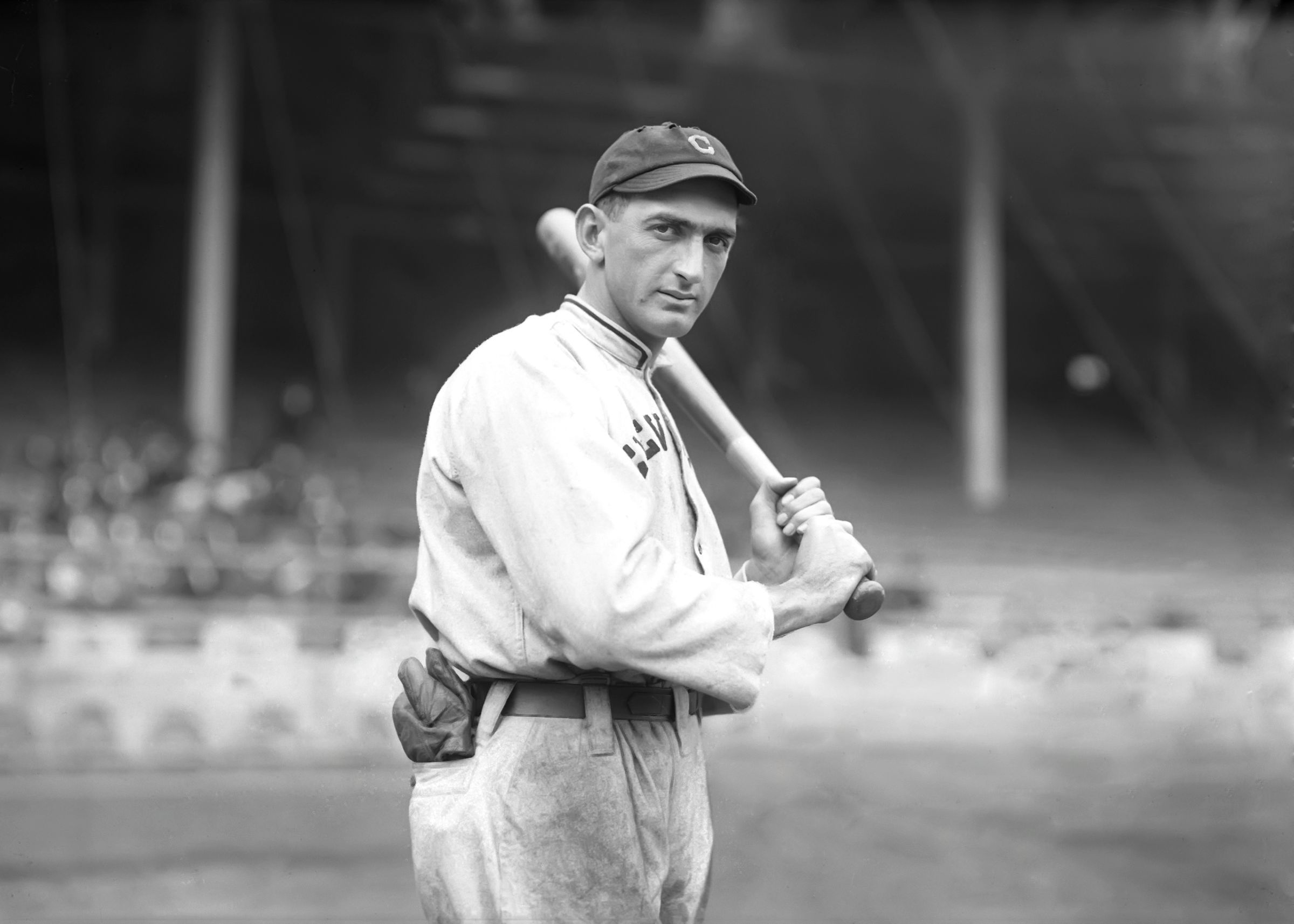
- Jackson with the Cleveland Naps in 1913
- Outfielder
- Born: July 16, 1887; Pickens County, South Carolina, U.S.
- Died: December 5, 1951 (aged 64); Greenville, South Carolina, U.S.
- Batted: Left Threw: Right

MLB debut
- August 25, 1908, for the Philadelphia Athletics

Last MLB appearance
- September 27, 1920, for the Chicago White Sox

MLB statistics
- Batting average: .356
- Home runs: 54
- Runs batted in: 792
- Stats at Baseball Reference

Teams
- Philadelphia Athletics (1908–1909); Cleveland Naps / Indians (1910–1915); Chicago White Sox (1915–1920)

Career highlights and awards
- World Series champion (1917); Cleveland Guardians Hall of Fame

Joseph Jefferson Jackson (July 16, 1887 – December 5, 1951), nicknamed "Shoeless Joe", was an American professional baseball outfielder who played in Major League Baseball (MLB) in the early 20th century. His .356 career batting average is one of the highest in major-league history. (Note: Jackson is considered to have the third-highest career batting average by Baseball Almanac and ESPN, and the fourth-highest by Baseball Reference. He does not appear in the list of career batting average leaders presented on MLB.com, as that list requires a player to have had a minimum of 5,000 at bats to qualify; Jackson had 4,981 at bats during his major-league career. See also List of Major League Baseball career batting average leaders.) Jackson is often remembered for his association with the Black Sox Scandal in which eight members of the 1919 Chicago White Sox participated in a conspiracy to fix the World Series. As a result, Commissioner Kenesaw Mountain Landis permanently banned Jackson and the other seven players from professional baseball after the 1920 season. During the World Series in question, Jackson had led both teams in several statistical categories and set a World Series record with 12 base hits, including, during the last game, the only home run in that World Series. Jackson's role in the scandal, banishment from the game, and exclusion from the Baseball Hall of Fame have been fiercely debated. In 2025, Commissioner Rob Manfred removed Jackson and other deceased players from the MLB's permanently ineligible list, thus lifting the ban and making him once again eligible for the hall of fame.

Jackson played for three major-league teams during his 12-year career, primarily in left field. He spent 1908–1909 as a member of the Philadelphia Athletics and 1910 with the minor league New Orleans Pelicans before joining the Cleveland Naps at the end of the 1910 season. He was still considered a rookie in 1911 when he hit for a .408 average, a single-season record for a rookie that still stands. (Note: Although he was in the majors as early as 1908, major-league rules at the time stipulated that a player was considered a rookie until he had more than 130 at-bats in a season.) He remained in Cleveland until early in the 1915 season; he then played for the White Sox through 1920. Later, Jackson played baseball under assumed names throughout the South.

Jackson holds the now Cleveland Guardians and Chicago White Sox franchise records for triples in a season and career batting average. In 1999, he ranked number 35 on The Sporting News' list of the 100 Greatest Baseball Players and was a finalist for the Major League Baseball All-Century Team. The fans voted him as the 12th-best outfielder of all time. He also ranks 33rd on the all-time list for non-pitchers according to the win shares formula developed by sabermetrician Bill James. Baseball legend Babe Ruth said that he modeled his hitting method after Jackson's.

== Early life ==
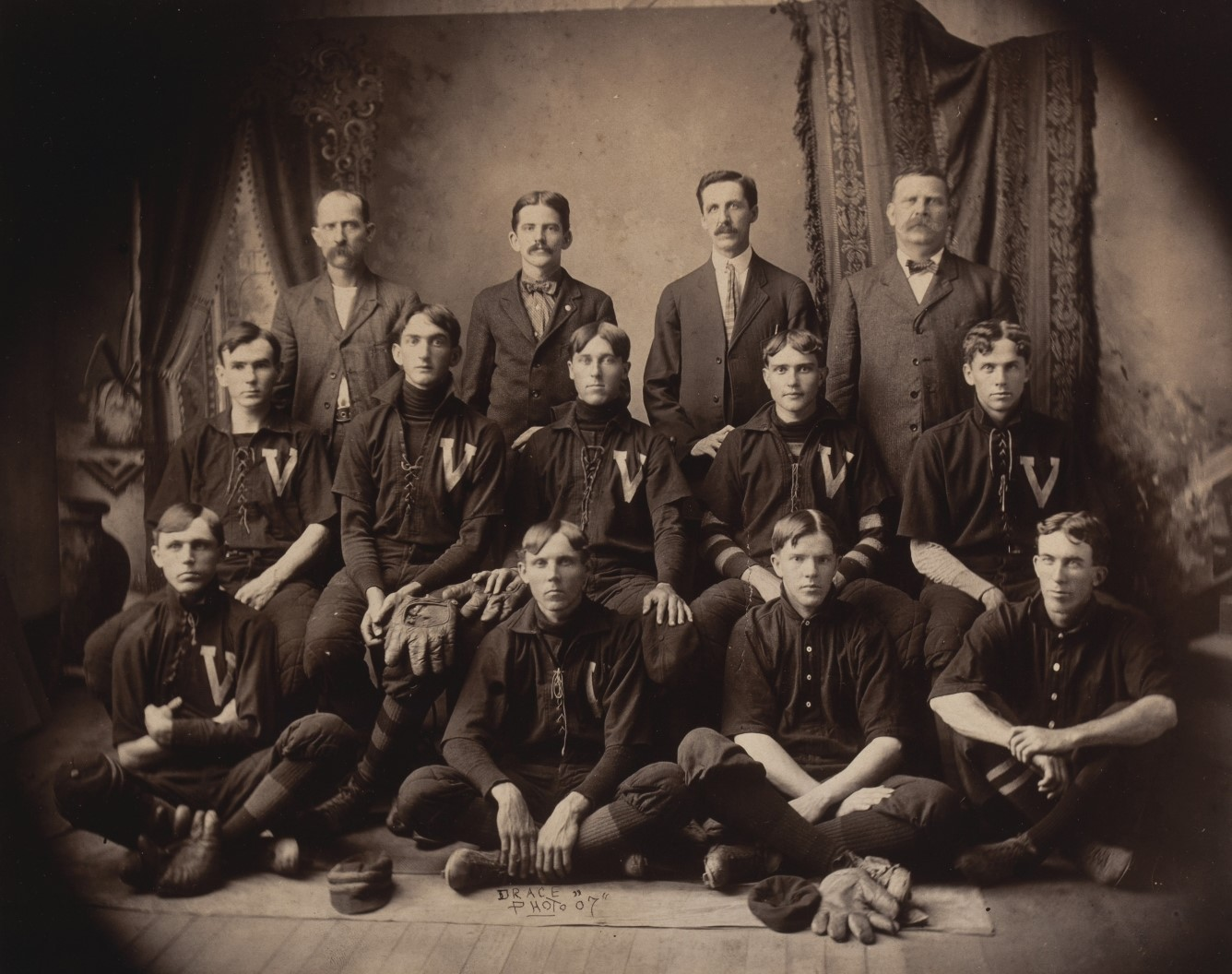
Jackson (middle row, second from left) with the 1907 Victor Mills team

Jackson was born in Pickens County, South Carolina, the oldest son of George Jackson, a sharecropper. While Jackson was still a baby, his father moved the family to Pelzer, South Carolina. A few years later, the family moved to a company town called Brandon Mill on the outskirts of Greenville, South Carolina. An attack of measles almost killed him when he was 10. He was bedridden for two months and paralyzed while he was nursed back to health by his mother.

Starting at the age of 6 or 7, Jackson worked in one of the town's textile mills as a "linthead", a derogatory name for a mill hand. Family finances required Jackson to take 12-hour shifts in the mill, and since education at the time was a luxury the Jackson family couldn't afford, Jackson was functionally illiterate. His lack of education ultimately became an issue throughout Jackson's life. It even affected the value of his memorabilia in the collectibles market; because Jackson was illiterate, he often had his wife forge his signature. Consequently, anything provably autographed by Jackson himself brings a premium when sold, including one autograph which was sold for $23,500 in 1990 (equivalent to $58,000 in 2025). In restaurants, rather than ask someone to read the menu to him, he would wait until his teammates ordered and then order one of the items that he heard.

In 1900, when he was 13 years old, his mother was approached by one of the owners of the Brandon Mill, and he started to play for the mill's baseball team. He was the youngest player on the team. He was paid $2.50 to play on Saturdays (equivalent to $97 in 2025). Jackson was initially a pitcher, but one day he accidentally broke another player's arm with a fastball. No one wanted to bat against him, so the team manager placed him in the outfield. Jackson's hitting ability made him a celebrity around town. Around that time, he was given a baseball bat that he named Black Betsy. He was compared to Champ Osteen, another player from the mills who made it to the majors. Jackson moved from mill team to mill team in search of better pay, playing semi-professional baseball by 1905.

=== Nickname ===
In an interview published in the October 1949 edition of Sport magazine, Jackson recalled that he got his nickname during a mill game played in Greenville, South Carolina. Jackson had blisters on his foot from a new pair of cleats, which hurt so much that he took his shoes off before he was at bat. As play continued, a heckling fan noticed Jackson running to third base in his socks and shouted, "You shoeless son of a gun, you!" and the resulting nickname "Shoeless Joe" stuck with him throughout the remainder of his life.

== Professional career ==
=== Early professional career ===
In 1908, Jackson began his professional baseball career with his hometown minor league team, the Greenville Spinners of the Carolina Association, married 15-year-old Katie Wynn, and eventually signed with Connie Mack to play for the Philadelphia Athletics.

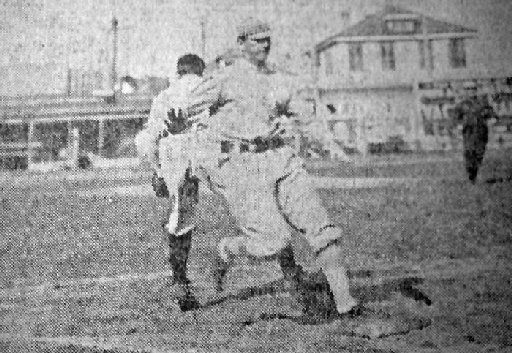
Jackson with the Pelicans in 1910

Jackson started the season with the Spinners for $75 a month and hit .346 to lead the Carolina Association in batting average, hits, and RBI for 1908. In August 1908, his contract was purchased by Connie Mack of the Philadelphia Athletics for $900. Jackson immediately reported to the Athletics and made his major-league debut on August 25, 1908, starting in centerfield and batting fourth against Cleveland at Philadelphia's Columbia Park. Jackson came to bat with one out in the first inning with Topsy Hartsel on third base and Eddie Collins on first to face Cleveland's Heinie Berger. According to the Philadelphia Inquirer, "The youngster was given a kindly welcome by the fans and he acknowledged it by singling past Bradley, scoring Hartsel." Jackson would finish 1 for 4 in the game, which the A's lost 3-2.

For the first two years of his career, Jackson had some trouble adjusting to life with the Athletics; reports conflict as to whether he did not like the big city or was bothered by hazing from teammates. Consequently, he spent much of that time in the minor leagues. Between 1908 and 1909, Jackson appeared in just 10 major-league games. During the 1909 season, Jackson played 118 games for the South Atlantic League's Savannah Indians. He batted .358 for the year.

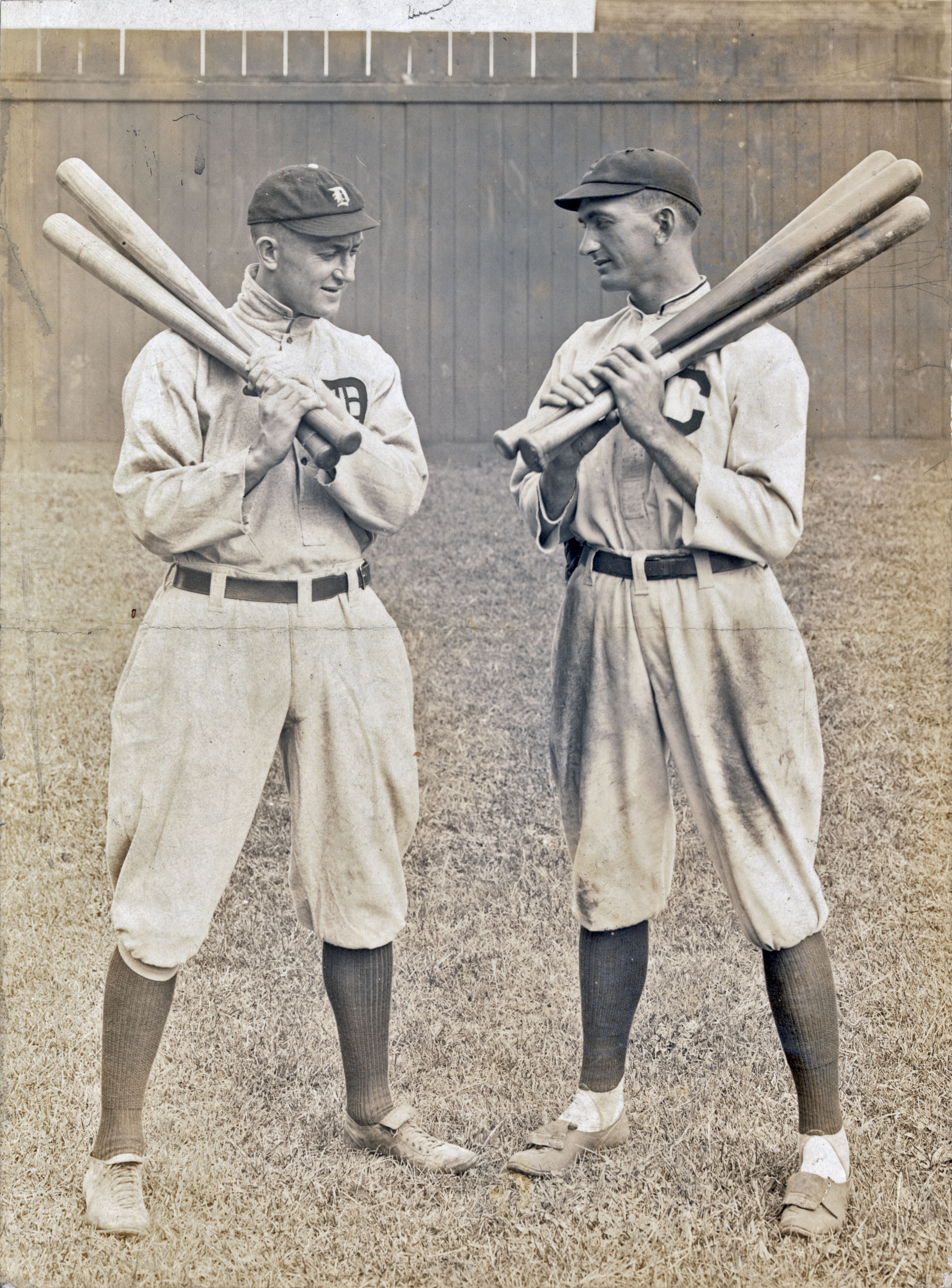
Ty Cobb and Jackson in Cleveland in 1913

The Athletics gave up on Jackson and in 1910 traded him to the Cleveland Naps. He spent most of 1910 with the New Orleans Pelicans of the Southern Association, where he won the batting title and led the team to the pennant. Late in the season, Jackson was called up to play on the major-league team. He appeared in 20 games for the Naps and managed a batting average of .387.

=== Major-league career ===
In 1911, his first full major-league season, Jackson set several rookie records. His .408 batting average that season is a record that still stands and was good for second overall in the league behind Ty Cobb's .419 — one of the few times in baseball history that a batting average above .400 did not win a batting title. His .468 on-base percentage led the league. The following season, Jackson batted .395 and led the American League in hits, triples, and total bases. On April 20, 1912, Jackson scored the first run in Tiger Stadium. The next year, he led the league with 197 hits and a .551 slugging percentage.

In August 1915, Jackson was traded to the Chicago White Sox. Two years later, Jackson and the White Sox won the American League pennant and also the World Series. During the series, Jackson hit .307 as the White Sox defeated the New York Giants.

Jackson missed most of the 1918 season while working in a shipyard because of World War I. In 1919, he returned to post a strong .351 average during the regular season and .375 in the World Series. However, the heavily favored White Sox lost the series to the Cincinnati Reds. The following season, the 32-year-old Jackson batted .382. He was having one of his best overall seasons, leading the American League in triples and setting by large margins career marks for home runs, RBI, and fewest strikeouts per plate appearance until he was suspended with seven other members of the White Sox after allegations surfaced that the team had thrown the previous World Series.

== Black Sox Scandal ==
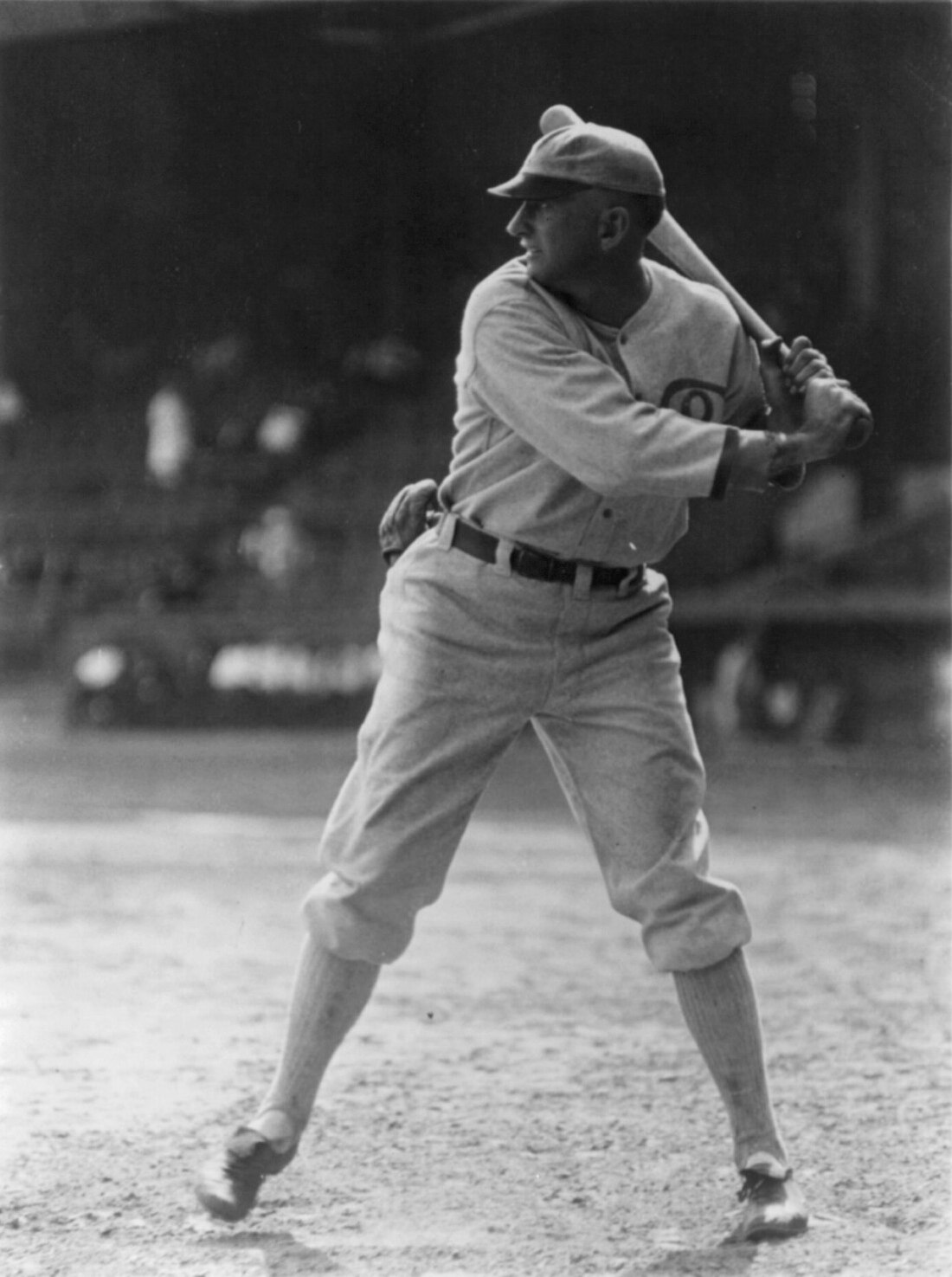
Jackson in 1920

After the White Sox lost the 1919 World Series to the Cincinnati Reds, Jackson and seven other White Sox players were accused of accepting $5,000 each (equivalent to $93,000 in 2025) to throw the Series. In September 1920, a grand jury was convened to investigate the allegations.

Jackson's 12 base hits set a Series record that was not broken until 1964, and he led both teams with a .375 batting average (.286 in the games the White Sox lost and .545 in the games they won). He committed no charged errors and threw out a runner at the plate. However, the Reds hit an unusually large number of triples, three out of nine total, to Jackson's position in left field. The Sox pitchers said the team's outfielders were playing out of position and slowly fielding balls.

Jackson admitted to participating in the fix during grand jury testimony on September 28, 1920, although he maintained he had not taken any on-field actions in exchange for the $5000 he received.

In 1921, a Chicago jury acquitted Jackson and his seven teammates of wrongdoing. Nevertheless, Kenesaw Mountain Landis, the newly appointed Commissioner of Baseball, imposed a lifetime ban on all eight players. "Regardless of the verdict of juries," Landis declared, "no player that throws a ballgame; no player that undertakes or promises to throw a ballgame; no player that sits in a conference with a bunch of crooked players and gamblers where the ways and means of throwing games are planned and discussed and does not promptly tell his club about it, will ever play professional baseball."

After the grand jury returned its indictments, Charley Owens of the Chicago Daily News wrote a regretful tribute headlined, "Say it ain't so, Joe." The phrase became legendary when another reporter later erroneously attributed it to a child outside the courthouse:

When Jackson left the criminal court building in the custody of a sheriff after telling his story to the grand jury, he found several hundred youngsters, aged from 6 to 16, waiting for a glimpse of their idol. One child stepped up to the outfielder, and, grabbing his coat sleeve, said:
"It ain't true, is it, Joe?"
"Yes, kid, I'm afraid it is," Jackson replied. The boys opened a path for the ball player and stood in silence until he passed out of sight.
"Well, I'd never have thought it," sighed the lad.

In an interview in Sport nearly three decades later, Jackson confirmed that the legendary exchange never occurred.

=== Dispute over Jackson's guilt ===
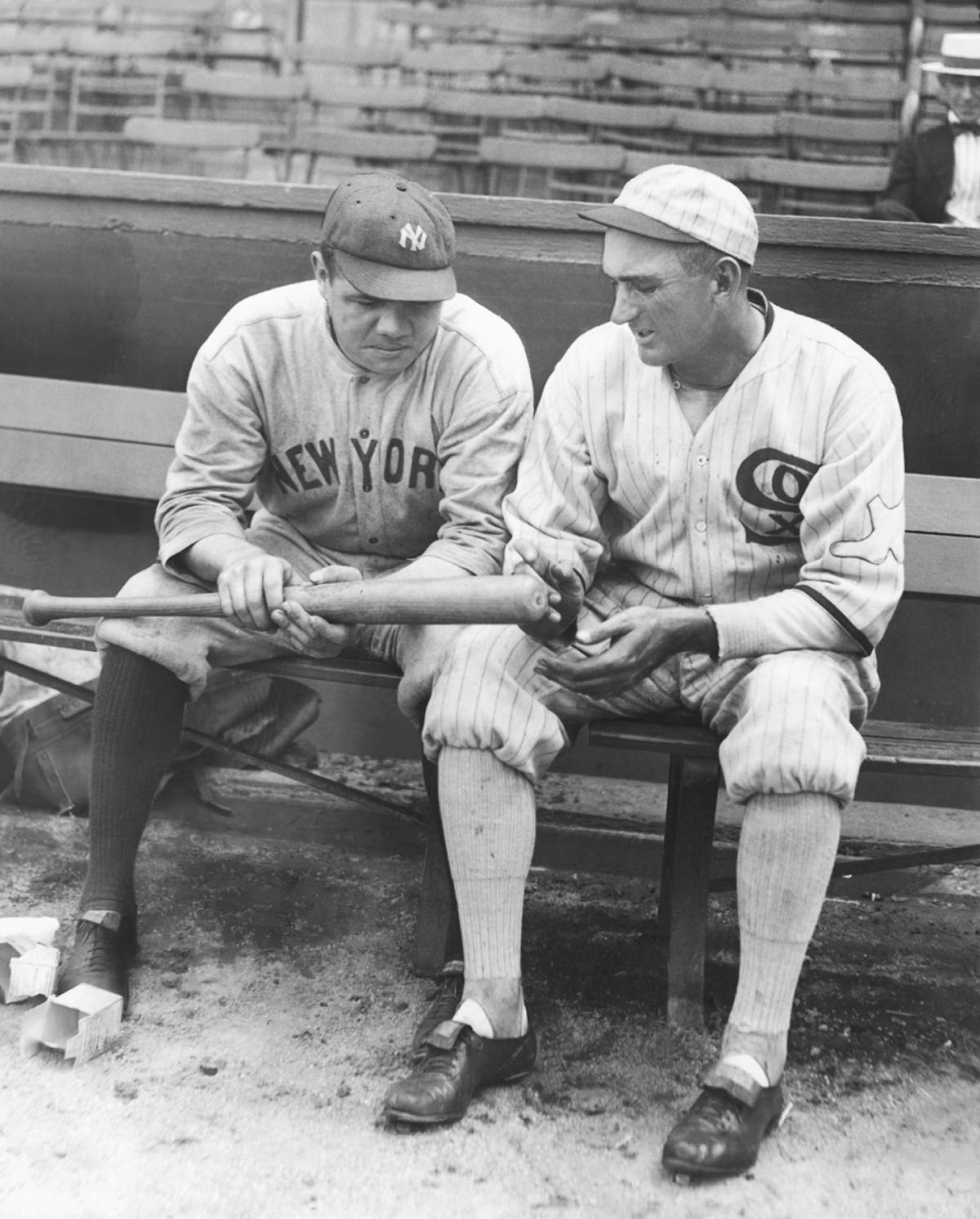
Babe Ruth and Joe Jackson in 1920

Jackson's involvement in the scandal remains controversial to this day. He reportedly refused the $5,000 bribe twice—even though it would effectively double his salary—only to have teammate Lefty Williams toss the cash on the floor of his hotel room. Jackson then tried to tell White Sox owner Charles Comiskey about the fix. Still, Comiskey refused to meet with him. Unable to afford legal counsel, Jackson was represented by team attorney Alfred Austrian—a clear conflict of interest for the attorney. Before Jackson's grand jury testimony, Austrian allegedly elicited Jackson's admission of his supposed role in the fix by plying him with whiskey. Austrian also persuaded the nearly illiterate Jackson to sign a waiver of immunity from prosecution.

Years later, the other seven players implicated in the scandal confirmed that Jackson was never at any meetings. Williams said they only mentioned Jackson's name to give their plot more credibility, although he did not say why Jackson would have been paid $5,000 had that been the case. Jackson's performance during the series itself lends further credence to his assertions, although the game records show that he hit better during the "clean" games than those thrown. A 1993 article in The American Statistician reported the results of a statistical analysis of Jackson's contribution during the 1919 World Series and concluded that there was "substantial support to Jackson's subsequent claims of innocence."

An article in the September 2009 issue of Chicago Lawyer magazine argued that Eliot Asinof's 1963 book Eight Men Out, purporting to confirm Jackson's guilt, was based on inaccurate information. For example, Jackson never confessed to throwing the series, as Asinof claimed. Further, Asinof omitted key facts from publicly available documents, such as the 1920 grand jury records and proceedings of Jackson's successful 1924 lawsuit against Comiskey to recover back pay for the 1920 and 1921 seasons. Asinof's use of fictional characters within a supposedly non-fiction account also damaged the book's historical credibility.

In 1989, MLB Commissioner A. Bartlett Giamatti declined to reinstate Jackson because the case, he said, is "now best given to historical analysis and debate as opposed to a present-day review with an eye to reinstatement." In November 1999, the U.S. House of Representatives passed a resolution lauding Jackson's sporting achievements and encouraging MLB to rescind his ineligibility. The resolution was symbolic since the U.S. government had no jurisdiction in the matter, and Jackson had died in 1951, some 48 years earlier. Commissioner Bud Selig stated that Jackson's case was under review, but no decision was issued during Selig's tenure. In 2015, the Shoeless Joe Jackson Museum formally petitioned Commissioner Rob Manfred for reinstatement, on grounds that Jackson had "more than served his sentence" in the 95 years since his banishment. Manfred denied the request after an official review, writing: "The results of this work demonstrate to me that it is not possible now, over 95 years since those events took place and were considered by Commissioner Landis, to be certain enough of the truth to overrule Commissioner Landis' determinations".

In 2020, ESPN reported that MLB had shifted its policy and that the league "has no hold on banned players after they die because the ineligible list bars players from privileges that include a job with a major league club." It was unclear how that might affect Jackson's Hall of Fame prospects.

In 2025, Commissioner Manfred announced that MLB has changed its policy, such that all players are removed from the permanently ineligible list upon death. With this decision, Jackson was once more eligible for the Hall of Fame. Jackson, along with other reinstated players, will be eligible for consideration by the Hall of Fame's Classic Baseball Era Committee at their next meeting, in December 2027.

== Career statistics ==
See baseball statistics for an explanation of these statistics.

G	AB	H	2B	3B	HR	R	RBI	BB	SO	AVG	OBP	SLG	FP
1,332	4,981	1,772	307	168	54	873	785	519	158	.356	.423	.517	.964

== Later life ==
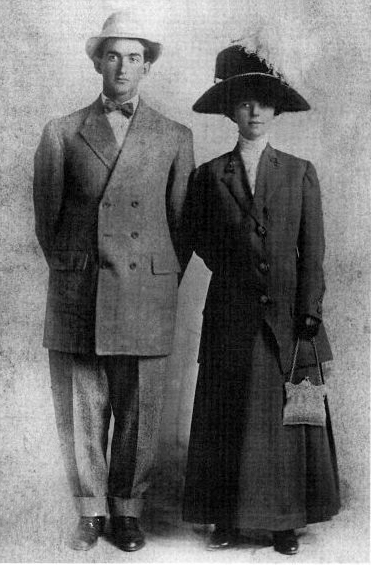
Jackson and his wife Katie on their wedding day in 1908

During the remaining 20 years of his baseball career, Jackson played with and managed several semi-professional teams, most located in Georgia and South Carolina, under assumed names. In 1922, Jackson moved to Savannah, Georgia, and opened a dry cleaning business with his wife.

In 1933, the Jacksons moved back to Greenville, South Carolina. After opening a barbecue restaurant, Jackson and his wife opened "Joe Jackson's Liquor Store", which they operated until his death. One of the better-known stories of Jackson's post-major league life occurred at the store. Ty Cobb and sportswriter Grantland Rice entered the store, with Jackson showing no sign of recognition of Cobb. After making his purchase, Cobb finally asked Jackson, "Don't you know me, Joe?" Jackson replied, "Sure, I know you, Ty, but I wasn't sure you wanted to know me. A lot of them don't."

As he aged, Jackson began to suffer from heart trouble. In 1951, at the age of 64, he died of a heart attack. Jackson was the first of the eight banned players to die and is buried at Woodlawn Memorial Park in Greenville. He had no children, but he and his wife raised two of his nephews.

== Legacy ==
Though Jackson was banned from major-league baseball, statues and parks have been constructed in his honor. One of the landmarks built for him was a memorial park in Greenville, Shoeless Joe Jackson Memorial Park.

Walter Johnson reportedly identified Jackson as the toughest hitter he ever faced.

In 1951, Jackson was inducted into the Cleveland Indians Hall of Fame as part of the inaugural class. The selection was controversial at the time because although he had not yet been barred from consideration for the National Baseball Hall of Fame, he had also not been enshrined therein. Additionally, his tenure with the Naps/Indians was relatively short. However, an outpouring of support from Indians fans convinced the sports editors voting on the selections to elect him unanimously.

Jackson was inducted into the Baseball Reliquary's Shrine of the Eternals in 2002.

In 2006, Jackson's original home was moved to a location adjacent to Fluor Field in downtown Greenville. The home was restored and opened in 2008 as the Shoeless Joe Jackson Museum. The address is 356 Field Street, in honor of his lifetime .356 batting average. The restoration and move were chronicled on TLC's reality show The Real Deal episode "A Home Run for Trademark", which aired March 31, 2007. Richard C. Davis, the owner of Trademark Properties, hired Josh Hamilton as the construction foreman.

Jackson's first relative to play professional baseball since his banishment was catcher Joseph Ray Jackson. The great-great-grandnephew of Shoeless Joe batted .386 for The Citadel in 2013 and was then drafted by the Texas Rangers. Later that year, he made his professional debut with the Northwest League's Spokane Indians.

In October 2021, a signed photograph of Jackson sold for $1.47 million, making it the most expensive sports photograph.

In May 2025, Commissioner Rob Manfred announced that a person's time on Major League Baseball's "permanently ineligible list" ends upon the death "of the disciplined individual," and as such, Jackson had been posthumously removed from that list. Hall of Fame chairman of the board Jane Forbes Clark said that Jackson's reinstatement meant that he will now be eligible for consideration by the "Classic Baseball Era" subcommittee of the Veterans Committee at their next meeting, in December 2027.

=== Films ===
Shoeless Joe was depicted in Eight Men Out, a 1988 film directed by John Sayles based on the 1963 Eliot Asinof book of the same name. The film details the Black Sox Scandal in general and has D. B. Sweeney portraying Jackson.

Phil Alden Robinson's 1989 film Field of Dreams, based on the 1982 book Shoeless Joe by W. P. Kinsella, stars Ray Liotta as Jackson. Kevin Costner plays an Iowa farmer who hears a mysterious voice instructing him to build a baseball field on his farm so Shoeless Joe—among others—can play baseball again.

== See also ==
- List of Chicago White Sox team records
- List of Cleveland Indians team records
- List of people banned from Major League Baseball
- List of Major League Baseball players with a .400 batting average in a season
- List of Major League Baseball annual doubles leaders
- List of Major League Baseball annual triples leaders
- List of Major League Baseball career batting average leaders
- List of Major League Baseball career on-base percentage leaders
- List of Major League Baseball career slugging percentage leaders
- List of Major League Baseball career OPS leaders
- List of Major League Baseball career triples leaders
- List of Major League Baseball triples records

== Bibliography ==
- Eight Men Out: The Black Sox and the 1919 World Series (1963), by Eliot Asinof
- Say It Ain't So, Joe!: The True Story of Shoeless Joe Jackson (1979), by Donald Gropman
- Shoeless: The Life And Times of Joe Jackson (2001), by David L. Fleitz
- Shoeless Joe & Me (2002), by Dan Gutman
- Shoeless Joe (1982), novel by W. P. Kinsella
