= Happy Felsch =

American baseball outfielder (1891–1964)

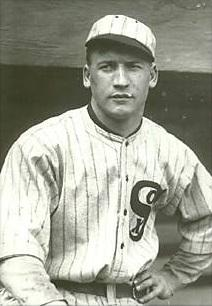
- Felsch c. 1919
- Center fielder
- Born: August 22, 1891; Milwaukee, Wisconsin, U.S.
- Died: August 17, 1964 (aged 72); Milwaukee, Wisconsin, U.S.
- Batted: Right Threw: Right

MLB debut
- April 14, 1915, for the Chicago White Sox

Last MLB appearance
- September 26, 1920, for the Chicago White Sox

MLB statistics
- Batting average: .293
- Home runs: 38
- Runs batted in: 443
- Stats at Baseball Reference

Teams
- Chicago White Sox (1915–1920)

Career highlights and awards
- World Series champion (1917)

Oscar Emil "Happy" Felsch (August 22, 1891 – August 17, 1964) was an American center fielder in Major League Baseball who played for the Chicago White Sox from 1915 to 1920. He is best known for his involvement in the 1919 Black Sox scandal. Felsch was reinstated by Commissioner Rob Manfred on May 13, 2025 along with other deceased players who were on the ineligible list.

== Early life ==
Felsch was born in Milwaukee, Wisconsin, to German immigrant parents. He dropped out of school in the sixth grade and played baseball on Milwaukee sandlots. He began his professional baseball career in the Wisconsin-Illinois League in 1913. The next season, he batted .304 and slugged .512 for the American Association's Milwaukee Brewers, and was purchased by the White Sox.

== Major league career ==
From 1916 to 1920, Felsch was one of the best hitters in the American League, finishing in the top 10 in more than a few major batting categories. His 102 runs batted in was good enough for second place in 1917, as the White Sox won the World Series. He missed most of the 1918 season due to military service.

Felsch continued his good hitting and fielding in 1919. He had a strong throwing arm and was highly regarded as a center fielder; He led the AL in outfield putouts and assists in 1919. The White Sox won the pennant going away.

That fall, Felsch agreed to join a group of White Sox players that planned to intentionally lose the 1919 World Series in exchange for monetary payments from a network of gamblers. He was reluctant to go along with the plan at first but then eventually did because of the money. There was little doubt of Felsch's guilt on the field, as he not only hit poorly, but also misplayed flyballs in key situations. Chicago lost the series, five games to three.

For his part in the fix, Felsch received $5,000, which was more than his entire regular season salary of $2,750. However, after the scandal broke in late 1920, Felsch, along with seven other players, was made permanently ineligible for organized baseball by Commissioner Kenesaw Mountain Landis. 1920, his last season in the majors, was his best. He hit .338 with 14 home runs and 115 runs batted in and it is possible that he would have put up more big numbers in the live-ball era.

Felsch later said, as quoted by the Chicago American:

Well, the beans are spilled and I think I'm through with baseball. I got $5,000. I could have got just about that much by being on the level if the Sox had won the Series. And now I'm out of baseball—the only profession I know anything about, and a lot of gamblers have gotten rich. The joke seems to be on us.

== Career statistics ==
In 749 games over 6 seasons, Felsch posted a .293 batting average (825-for-2812) with 385 runs, 135 doubles, 64 triples, 38 home runs, 443 RBI, 88 stolen bases, 207 bases on balls, .347 on-base percentage and .427 slugging percentage. He finished his career with a .975 fielding percentage playing primarily at center field. In the 1917 and 1919 World Series, he hit .229 (11-for-48) with 6 runs, 1 home run and 6 RBI.

== Later life ==
Felsch spent the next 15 years touring the country with various amateur and semi-pro teams, including Scobey, Montana Outlaws in 1925 and 1926; Regina, Saskatchewan in 1927 (Regina Balmorals of the Southern Saskatchewan Baseball League), in Virden, Manitoba of the Winnipeg Senior League; and finally in Plentywood, Montana in 1928.

After his playing days ended, he opened up a grocery store as well as a number of drinking establishments.

Felsch died of a liver ailment in Milwaukee in 1964, just five days before his 73rd birthday. He was survived by his wife Marie and three children. He is buried at Wisconsin Memorial Park in Brookfield, Wisconsin.

In the 1988 film Eight Men Out, Felsch was portrayed by Charlie Sheen.

== See also ==
- List of people banned from Major League Baseball
