= Lefty Williams =

American baseball pitcher (1893–1959)

- Williams in 1916
- Pitcher
- Born: March 9, 1893; Aurora, Missouri, U.S.
- Died: November 4, 1959 (aged 66); Laguna Beach, California, U.S.
- Batted: Right Threw: Left

MLB debut
- September 17, 1913, for the Detroit Tigers

Last MLB appearance
- September 25, 1920, for the Chicago White Sox

MLB statistics
- Win–loss record: 82–48
- Earned run average: 3.13
- Strikeouts: 515
- Stats at Baseball Reference

Teams
- Detroit Tigers (1913–1914); Chicago White Sox (1916–1920)

Career highlights and awards
- World Series champion (1917)

Claude Preston "Lefty" Williams (March 9, 1893 – November 4, 1959) was an American pitcher in Major League Baseball. He is probably best known for his involvement in the 1919 World Series fix, known as the Black Sox Scandal.

== Career ==
Williams was born in Aurora, Missouri, to William and Mary Williams. He began his major league career on September 17, 1913, with the Detroit Tigers.

Williams' breakthrough season came in 1915, while with the Salt Lake City Bees of the Pacific Coast League. That year, he pitched 418.2 innings, leading the league in wins (33) and strikeouts (294), while featuring mostly his mid-90s fastball and swooping curve. His contract was then purchased by the Chicago White Sox.

With the White Sox, Williams settled into the starting rotation and helped the team win the pennant in 1917, going 17–8. After spending 1918 working in Navy shipyards, he came back strong in 1919 with his greatest performance, going 23–11 with a 2.64 earned run average. The White Sox again won the American League pennant. However, before that year's World Series, he was involved in the Black Sox Scandal when teammate Chick Gandil offered him $10,000 to lose his starts. Williams only received $5,000, half of what he was promised, a sum that was still almost double his 1919 salary of $2,600.

In the series, Williams went 0–3, with an earned run average of 6.61. His three losses were a World Series record. That was equaled in the 1981 Series when George Frazier lost three games. Eight Men Out author Eliot Asinof wrote that Williams eventually turned against the fix as he prepared for his final Series start; Asinof later admitted that this particular anecdote was made up.

In 1920, Williams went 22–14, but was caught up in the indictments handed down that autumn. Though acquitted by a jury, Williams and the seven other "Black Sox" were banned from organized baseball by Commissioner Kenesaw Mountain Landis.

Afterwards, Williams barnstormed and played in outlaw leagues for a few years, and he played briefly for the Fort Bayard Veterans team in New Mexico which was part of the Copper League or Cactus League. He supposedly took to drinking heavily. It was reported that the between-inning "nips" made him an intimidating pitcher to the batters.

Williams is listed as a manager of the Anaheim/San Bernardino Valencias for part of the 1948 season of the Class-C Sunset League.

Williams spent his later years in Laguna Beach, California where he died in 1959, operating a garden nursery business.

Williams was portrayed by actor James Read in the 1988 film Eight Men Out.

Williams was reinstated by Commissioner Rob Manfred on May 13, 2025 along with other deceased players who were on the ineligible list.

== See also ==
- List of people banned from Major League Baseball
- List of Chicago White Sox team records
