= Maysville, Kentucky minor league baseball =

Maysville, Kentucky minor league baseball teams
- 1894–1923; (1894, 1910–1916, 1922–1923); Maysville, Kentucky

Minor league affiliations
- Class: Independent (1894); Class D (1910–1916, 1922–1923)
- League: Tri-State League (1894); Blue Grass League (1910–1912); Ohio State League (1913–1916); Blue Grass League (1922–1923)

Major league affiliations
- Team: None

Minor league titles
- League titles (1): 1922
- Conference titles (1): 1922
- Wild card berths (2): 1915; 1922

Team data
- Name: Maysville (1894); Maysville Rivermen (1910–1912); Maysville Angels (1913–1915); Maysville Burley Cubs (1916); Maysville Cardinals (1922–1923)
- Ballpark: Maysville Base Ball Park/League Park (1910–1916, 1922–1923)

Minor league baseball teams were based in Maysville, Kentucky in various seasons between 1894 and 1923. Maysville teams played as members of the Tri-State League in 1894, Blue Grass League from 1910 to 1912, Ohio State League from 1913 to 1916 and Blue Grass League from 1922 to 1923, winning one league championship. Maysville hosted home minor league games at the Maysville Base Ball Park/League Park. Baseball Hall of Fame member Casey Stengel played for the 1910 Maysville Rivermen in his first professional season.

== History ==
Early amateur Maysville teams began play in 1860 with the Maysville Town Ball Club. In the 1890s, a Maysville amateur team reportedly won a three–game series against the Cincinnati Reds.

Maysville first hosted minor league baseball in 1894, when the Maysville team played as members of the Tri-State League. The 1894 league records are unknown.

On August 24, 1910, the Shelbyville Grays franchise of the Class D level Blue Grass League relocated to Maysville, Kentucky, finishing the 1910 season playing as the Maysville Rivermen. Reports state that Maysville owners purchased the Shelbyville franchise for $500.00. The owners of the Maysville team were local citizens, headed up by businessmen, J.W. Fitzgerald and Preston Wells. The Rivermen had a record of 3–24 after the move to Maysville. In 1910, Maysville businesses offered gifts to players who hit home runs. The Shelbyville/Maysville team finished last, in sixth place, with a 37–89 overall record and were 42.5 games behind the first place Paris Bourbonites in the final standings. Anton Kuhn and Daniel Collins managed the 1910 team.

Baseball Hall of Fame inductee Casey Stengel played for the 1910 Shelbyville Grays/Maysville Rivermen. Playing at age 19, Stengel hit .223 for the team in 69 games and 233 at–bats, after beginning the 1910 season with the Kankakee Kays. During the season, Stengel hit a home run and received a box of candy and a Duplex Safety-razor outfit. A young Maysville boy named Robert Willocks would carry Stengel's spikes and glove to the ballpark where Stengel would get him into the game for free.

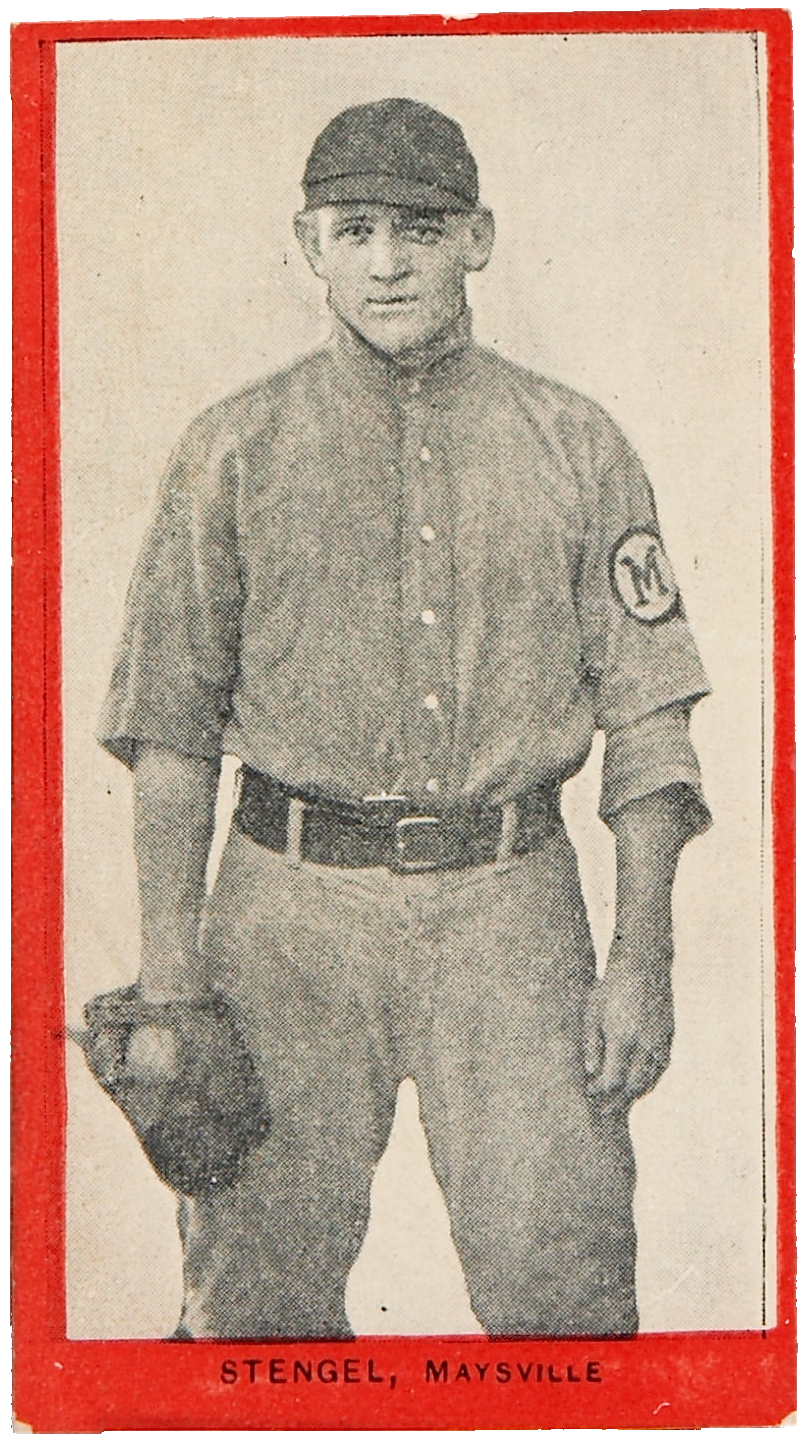
(1910) Baseball Hall of Fame member Casey Stengel, Maysville Rivermen.

Maysville continued play in the 1911 Blue Grass League season. An opening day parade featured Blue Grass League President Dr. W.C. Ussery. Maysville Mayor J.W. Lee threw out the first pitch and declared the day a business holiday. A crowd of 3,000 saw Maysville beat the Paris Bourbonites. The Maryville Rivermen finished with a record of 55–63, placing fourth under manager James Carmoney. Maysville finished the season 17.5 games behind the first place Paris Bourbonites.

The 1912 Maysville Rivermen placed second in the Blue Grass league, finishing 4.0 games behind the first place Frankfort Lawmakers. In 1912, the Mt. Olivet band played at the Maysville Rivermen season home opener. Maysville was under the direction of owner Thomas Russell.

Finishing the 1912 season with an 82–47 record under managers James Carmoney and Harry Kunkel, the Rivermen finished behind Frankfort's 85–42 record. They were followed by the Lexington Colts (60–65), Paris Bourbonites (60–69), Richmond Pioneers (66–64) and Mount Sterling Orphans (31–97). The Blue Grass League folded following the 1912 season.

After the Blue Grass League folded, Maysville continued minor league play in 1913 in a new league. The Maysville Angles became members of the 1913 eight–team Class D level Ohio State League. With a 38–96 record, Maysville placed eighth and last in the league, ending the season 46.0 games behind the first place Chillicothe Babes. The 1913 Maysville manager was Frank Moore.

The 1914 Maysville Angels disbanded from the eight–team Ohio State League during the season. Maysville folded on July 22, 1914, after beating Huntington 2–1. At the time, the team had a record of 30–51 under managers Ollie Chapman and Roy Montgomery.

After the 1915 season began, Maysville resumed play during the season in the six–team Ohio State League and played in the league finals. On July 13, 1915, the Chillicothe Babes, with a 27–34 record, moved to Huntington, West Virginia. After just six games, Huntington (2–4) moved to Maysville on July 19, 1915. The team finished the season with an overall record of 58–55, to place third in the regular season under manager Josh Devore. The combined team finished 13.0 games behind the first place Portsmouth Cobblers and the team advanced to a playoff. In the Finals, the Portsmouth Cobblers defeated Maysville 4 games to 1. The 1916 Ohio State League members were the Charleston Senators (58–63), Chillicothe Babes/Huntington/Maysville Angels (58–55), Frankfort Old Taylors (45–65), Ironton Nailers (47–69), Lexington Colts (63–48) and Portsmouth Cobblers (71–42).

The Ohio State League permanently folded on July 19, 1916, with the Maysville Burley Cubs as a league member. At the time the Ohio State League folded, the Cubs had a 26–36 record and were in fourth place, finishing 19.0 games behind the first place Portsmouth Truckers. The 1916 Cubs' manager was Jimmy Jones.

Maysville won a championship in 1922. Maysville returned to play in the Class D level Blue Grass League, which reformed as a six–team league. The Maysville Cardinals, owned again by Thomas Russell, finished the regular season in second place with a 33–28 record under manager Norbert Bosken. The Maysville Cardinals, with a 16–6 record, won the first half standings and the Cynthiana Merchants, with a 25–17 record, won the second half standings, as the Blue Grass league played a split–season schedule in 1922. In the Finals, Maysville defeated the Cynthiana Merchants three games to one to win the 1922 Blue Grass League Championship.

In their final season of play, the Maysville Cardinals placed third in the 1923 Blue Grass League standings. Maysville had a record of 48–45 under returning manager Norbert Bosken, finishing 3.0 games behind the first place Cynthiana Cobblers. The standings were led by the Cynthiana Cobblers (54–43), followed by the Winchester Dodgers (53–44), Maysville Cardinals (48–45), Paris Bourbons (45–47), Lexington Reos (44–49) and Mount Sterling Essex (38–54). Maysville permanently folded following the 1923 season. Maysville has not hosted another minor league team.

== The ballpark ==
Beginning in 1910, Maysville teams were noted to have played home games at the Maysville Base Ball Park. The ballpark was also called "League Park." Reportedly there was an asylum across from the ballpark, where patients would watch games and cheer the players. The ballpark was located between East 2nd Street & 3rd Streets at Houston Avenue, Maysville, Kentucky.

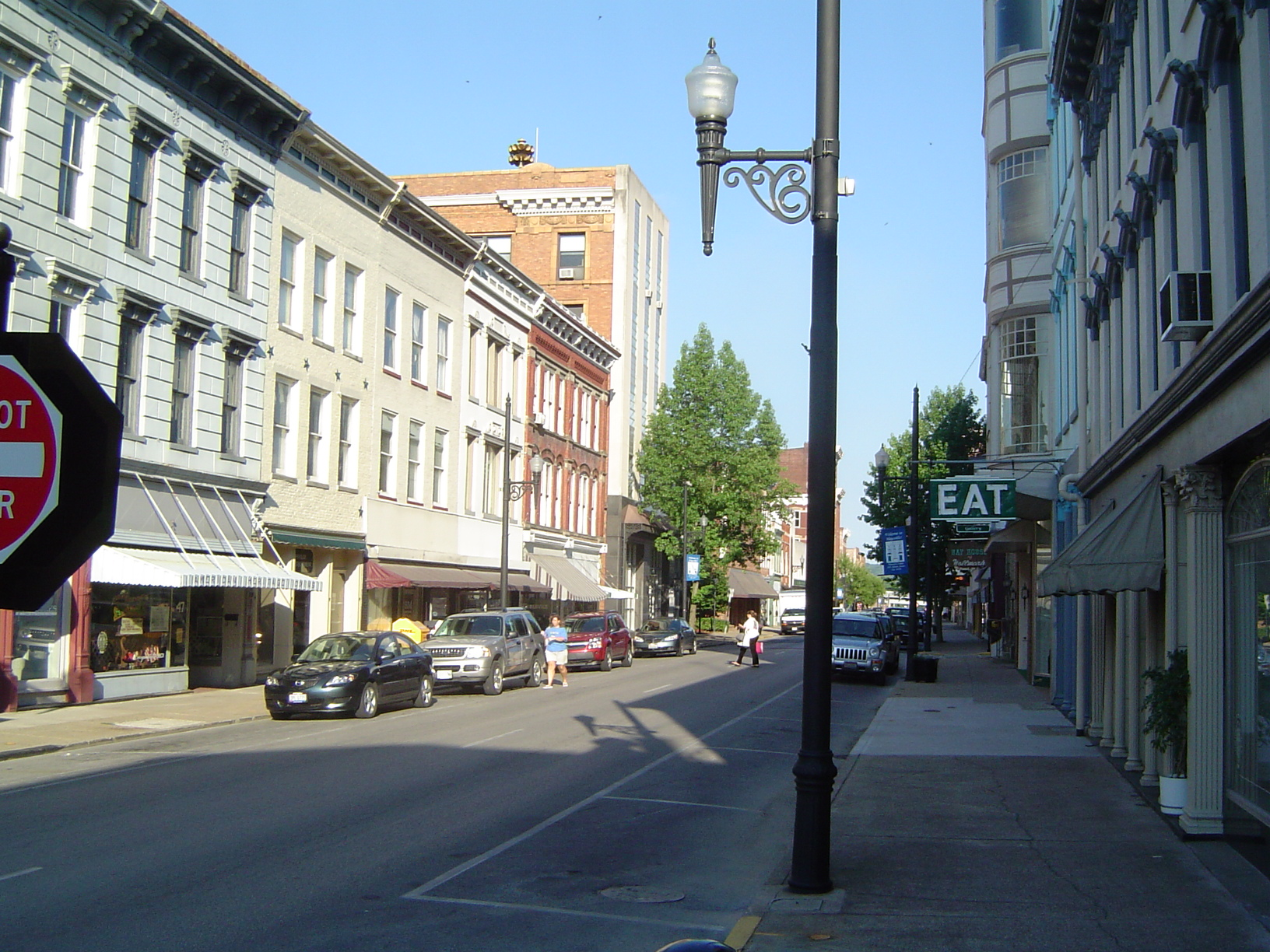
(2007) Maysville, Kentucky

== Timeline ==
Year(s)	# Yrs.	Team	Level	League	Ballpark
1894	1	Maysville	Independent	Tri-State League	Unknown
1910–1912	3	Maysville Rivermen	Class D	Blue Grass League	Maysville Base Ball Park
1913–1915	3	Maysville Angels	Class D	Ohio State League	Maysville Base Ball Park
1916	1	Maysville Burley Cubs	Class D	Ohio State League	Maysville Base Ball Park
1922–1923	2	Maysville Cardinals	Class D	Blue Grass League	Maysville Base Ball Park

== Year-by-year records ==
Year	Record	Finish	Manager	Playoffs/notes
1894	00–00	NA	NA	League standings unknown
1910	37–89	6th	Anton Kuhn / Daniel Collins	Shelbyville moved to Maysville August 24
1911	55–63	4th	James Carmoney	Did not qualify
1912	82–47	2nd	James Carmoney / Harry Kunkel	No playoffs held
1913	38–96	8th	Frank Moore	No playoffs held
1914	30–51	NA	Ollie Chapman / Roy Montgomery	Team disbanded July 22
1915	58–55	3rd	Josh Devore	Huntington moved to Maysville July 19; Lost in finals
1916	26–36	4th	Jim Jones	League folded July 19
1922	33–28	2nd	Norbert Bosken	League champions
1923	48–45	3rd	Norbert Bosken	No playoffs held

== Notable alumni ==
- Casey Stengel (1910) Inducted Baseball Hall of Fame, 1966
- Paul Carter (1913)
- Bill Cramer (1910)
- Lee Dashner (1913)
- Hank DeBerry (1915)
- Josh Devore (1915, MGR)
- Frank Emmer (1915)
- Ed Glenn (1910)
- Charlie Grover (1911–1912)
- Emil Huhn (1910)
- Jim Jones (1916, MGR)
- George Kircher (1910)
- Howard McGraner (1915–1916)
- Ray Miner (1922)
- Frank Moore (1913, MGR)
- Skeeter Shelton (1911)
- Scottie Slayback (1922)
- John Singleton (1915–1916)
- Jack Snyder (1911–1912)
- Ed Sperber (1916)
- Carl Weilman (1912)
- Harry Williams (1911–1912)
- Matt Zeiser (1915)

== See also ==
- Maysville (minor league baseball) players
- Maysville Angels players
- Maysville Rivermen players
