= Winchester Hustlers =

- 1908–1912; Winchester, Kentucky

Minor league affiliations
- Class: Class D (1908–1912)
- League: Blue Grass League (1908–1912)

Major league affiliations
- Team: None

Minor league titles
- League titles (1): 1909
- Conference titles (1): 1911

Team data
- Name: Winchester Hustlers (1908–1912)
- Ballpark: Garner's Park (1908–1912)

The Winchester Hustlers were a minor league baseball team based in Winchester, Kentucky. From 1908 to 1912, the Hustlers played exclusively as members of the Class D level Blue Grass League, winning the 1909 league championship. Winchester hosted home games at Garner's Park. In 1909, Winchester's Fred Toney pitched a 17-inning complete game no hitter, the longest no hitter thrown in organized baseball.

== History ==
In 1908, the Winchester Hustlers became charter members of the Class D level Blue Grass League during the season. The charter members in the six–team league were the Frankfort Lawmakers, Lawrenceburg Distillers, Lexington Colts, Richmond Pioneers, Shelbyville Millers and Versailles Aristocrats, beginning league play on May 22, 1908.

During the 1908 season, the Versailles franchise moved to Winchester, Kentucky. The "Hustlers" (also called the "Reds" in 1908) franchise began and ended the 1908 regular season in sixth place with a record of 22–47 playing under manager Guy Woodruff and finishing 24½ games behind the first place Frankfort Lawmakers.

The 1908 Blue Grass League held no playoffs and the first place Frankfort Statesmen (47–23) finished 9.0 games ahead of the second place Lexington Colts (37–31) in the six–team league. They were followed by the Richmond Pioneers (36–34), Lawrenceburg (33–35), Shelbyville Millers (32–37) and the Versailles Aristocrats / Winchester Reds (22–47).

Continuing Blue Grass League play in 1909, the Winchester Hustlers won the league championship by the narrowest of margins. With a record of 75–44, Winchester placed first in the six–team league, playing their championship season under manager Newt Horn. The Hustlers finished just ½ game ahead of the second-place Richmond Pioneers (75–45) in the final standings. The league held no playoffs. Winchester's Charles Burden led the Blue Grass with 25 wins.

In 1909, Winchester pitcher Fred Toney threw a 17-inning complete game no hitter, the longest no hitter thrown in organized baseball. On May 10, 1909, while pitching for the Hustlers, Toney defeated the Lexington Colts in 17 innings, winning 1–0, striking out 19 batters with one walk. Winchester scored the game's only run on a squeeze play in the bottom of the 17th inning.

In their third season of play, the 1910 Winchester Hustlers placed third in the final Blue Grass League standings. With a record of 63–59, the Hustlers, playing under managers Newt Horn and Frank Coleman, finished 10½ games behind the first place Paris Bourbonites and 5.0 games behind the second place Lexington Colts in the final standings. Pitcher Fred Toney had 23 wins for Winchester, leading the league, with teammate Wese Callahan's 147 total hits also leading the circuit.

In 1911, the Blue Grass League played a split–season schedule, with the winners of each half season meeting in the Finals. Winchester advanced to the Finals. In the regular season, the Paris Bourbonites had a 71–44 overall record and were 6.0 games ahead of the second place Lexington Colts in the final regular season standings and 13½ games ahead of the third place Hustlers, who finished with a 59–59 regular season record, playing the season under the direction of returning manager Frank Coleman. Paris won the first–half standings and Winchester won of the second–half standings. In the Finals, Paris swept Winchester in four games to defend their championship. Winchester pitcher Walter Burden led the Blue Grass League with 23 wins.

In 1912, the Winchester franchise relocated twice, eventually settling in Mt. Sterling, Kentucky, finishing the season as the Mt. Sterling Orphans while ending the season in last place. On June 8, 1912, the Winchester Hustlers, with a record of 13–24, moved to Nicholasville, Kentucky. After compiling a 3–27 record based in Nicholasville, on June 26, 1912, the franchise moved to Mt. Sterling to complete the season. Under managers Courtney McBrair and Bob Spade, the Orphans finished the 1912 season with an overall record of 31–97, placing sixth in the six–team Blue Grass League. The Orphans finished 54½ games behind the first place Frankfort Lawmakers (85–42) in the final standings. The Lexington Colts (60–65), Maysville Rivermen (82–47), Paris Bourbonites (60–69) and Richmond Pioneers (66–64) all finished ahead of Mt. Sterling. It was noted by the Spalding Guide that the Mount Sterling Orphans team "was in poor shape all of the year."

The Blue Grass League folded following the 1912 season and did not return to play until 1922. Winchester, Kentucky next hosted minor league baseball in 1922, when the Winchester Dodgers resumed play in the reformed Class D level Blue Grass League.

== The ballpark ==
The Winchester Hustlers hosted minor league home games at Garner's Park. The ballpark, which seated approximately 1,000 spectators, was situated on the eastern edge of town between East Broadway Street and Patio Street—an area that is now home to Shearer Elementary School and Memorial Park Avenue.

== Timeline ==
| Year(s) | # Yrs. | Team | Level | League | Ballpark |
|---|---|---|---|---|---|
| 1908–1912 | 5 | Winchester Hustlers | Class D | Blue Grass League | Garner's Park |

== Year–by–year records ==
| Year | Record | Finish | Manager | Playoffs/notes |
|---|---|---|---|---|
| 1908 | 22–47 | 6th | James Barnett | Versailles moved to Winchester; No playoffs held |
| 1909 | 61–57 | 1st | Newt Horn | No playoffs held League champions |
| 1910 | 63–59 | 3rd | Newt Horn / Frank Coleman | No playoffs held |
| 1911 | 59–39 | 3rd | Frank Coleman | Won 2nd half of split season Lost in Finals |
| 1912 | 31–97 | 5th | Courtney McBrair / Bob Spade | Winchester (13–34) moved to Nicholasville June 8 Nicholasville (3–27) moved to Mt. Sterling June 28 |

== Notable alumni ==
- Wese Callahan (1910–1911)
- Frank Edington (1910)
- George Kircher (1910)
- Harry LaRoss (1911)
- Charlie Mullen (1910)
- Fred Toney (1908–1909)

== See also ==
- Winchester Hustlers players
