= Paris Bourbonites =

- 1909–1912; (1909–1912, 1914, 1922–1924); Paris, Kentucky

Minor league affiliations
- Class: Class D (1909–1912, 1914, 1922–1924)
- League: Blue Grass League (1909–1912); Ohio State League (1914); Blue Grass League (1922–1924)

Major league affiliations
- Team: None

Minor league titles
- League titles (3): 1910; 1911; 1924
- Conference titles (1): 1922

Team data
- Name: Paris Bourbonites (1909–1912); Paris (1914); Paris Bourbons (1922–1924)
- Ballpark: Bourbon County Park (1909–1912, 1914, 1922–1924); White Park (1911–1912)

The Paris Bourbonites were a minor league baseball team based in Paris, Kentucky. The Bourbonites played as members of the Blue Grass League from 1909 to 1912, with Paris joining the Ohio State League in 1914 and the "Bourbons" returning to Blue Grass League play from 1922 to 1924. Paris teams won league championships in 1910, 1911 and 1924 and hosted home minor league games at Bourbon County Park.

== History ==
=== 1909 to 1914 ===
Minor league baseball began in Paris, Kentucky in 1909, when the "Paris Bourbonites" became members of the 1909 six team Class D level Blue Grass League, which was playing its second season. The Frankfort Lawmakers, Lexington Colts, Richmond Pioneers, Shelbyville Millers and Winchester Hustlers teams joined with Paris in beginning league play on May 1, 1909.

The Paris team monikers correspond to Paris, Kentucky being located within Bourbon County, Kentucky.

In their first season of play, the Paris Bourbonites finished with a record of 61–57. Paris placed third in the six–team league, playing the season under managers Jeff Elgin, Henry Schmidt and James Barnett. The Bourbonites finished 13.5 games behind the first place Winchester Hustlers in the final standings.

In their second season of play, the 1910 Paris Bourbonites won the Blue Grass League championship in convincing fashion. With a record of 80–47, Paris placed first in the regular season standings, playing under manager Edward McKernan. Paris finished 10.0 games ahead of the second place Lexington Colts in the final standings. Paris pitcher Milton McCormick led the Blue Grass League in win percentage at .850 and a 17–3 record. The Blue Grass League held no playoffs in 1910.

Paris won their second consecutive Blue Grass League championship in 1911. The Blue Grass League played a split–season schedule in 1911, with the winners of each half season meeting in the Finals. Under returning manager Edward McKernan, the Bourbonites had a 71–44 overall record and were 6.0 games ahead of the second place Lexington Colts in the final regular season standings. Paris qualified for the Finals by winning the first–half standings. The Winchester Hustlers won the second–half standings. In the Finals, the Paris Bourbonites swept the Winchester Hustlers 4 games to 0 to defend their championship.

Paris player Walter Mayer led the 1911 Blue Grass League in hitting in 1911, with a .352 average.

The 1912 Paris Bourbonites placed fifth in the Blue Grass League, as the league folded after the season concluded.

The opening day at Paris in 1912 featured a parade featuring the 14–member Paris High School Band and players from Paris and the Winchester Husters. On September 3, 1912, Paris pitcher Fred Applegate, tied a minor league record by recording 20 strikeouts in a game against the Mt. Sterling Orphans.

With a record of 60–69 under managers Joe Lewis and Danning Harrell, the 1912 Bourbonites finished 4.0 games behind the Frankfort Lawmakers and no playoffs were held in the Blue Grass League.> With a record of 85–42, Frankfort was followed in the standings by the Maysville Rivermen (82–47), Lexington Colts (60–65), Paris Bourbonites (60–69), Richmond Pioneers (66–64) and Winchester Hustlers/Mt. Sterling Orphans (31–97). The Blue Grass League folded following the 1912 season.

Paris player/manager Danning Harrell won the 19212Blue Grass League batting title, hitting .401 and Paris pitcher Jim Hauser led the league with 23 wins.

Paris briefly returned to minor league play in 1914, as the "Paris" team became members of the 1914 eight–team Class D level Ohio State League during the season. The Newport, Kentucky franchise, which entered the Ohio State League play on May 26, 1914, moved to Paris on June 16, 1914. The team had a 16–27 record playing as the Newport Brewers. After a 3–22 record while based in Paris, the team disbanded on July 5, 1914. At the time, the Newport/Paris team folded, the team had an overall 19–49 record, playing under managers Charles Applegate and Red Munson.

=== 1922 to 1924 ===
Paris resumed play in the reformed Blue Grass League in 1922 and won the league pennant. The Paris Bourbons returned to play as members of the Class D level Blue Grass League, which reformed as a six–team league. Some references have Paris playing under the "Mammoths" nickname in 1922. With the Blue Grass League playing a split–season schedule, the Paris Bourbons finished the overall regular season in first place with a 36–28 record, playing the season under managers B. Goodman and Harold Willis, finishing 1.5 games ahead of the second place Maysville Cardinals in the overall standings. However, the Maysville Cardinals, with a 16–6 record, won the first half standings and the Cynthiana Merchants, with a 25–17 record, won the second half standings, as the Blue Grass league played the split–season schedule in 1922. In the Finals, Maysville defeated the Cynthiana to win the championship.

Pitcher Ray Miner of Paris and Maysville led the Blue Grass League with 15 wins.

The Paris Bourbons placed fourth in the 1923 Blue Grass League standings, playing under managers Nick Winger and Felix Cicona. With a 45–47 record, the Bourbons finished 6.5 games behind the first place Cynthiana Cobblers in the final standings. The teams in the 1923 standings were the Cynthiana Cobblers (54–43), Winchester Dodgers (53–44), Maysville Cardinals (48–45), Paris Bourbons (45–47), Lexington Reos (44–49) and Mount Sterling Essex (38–54). Maysville and Mt. Sterling permanently folded following the 1923 season.

In their final season of play, the Paris Bourbons won the 1924 Blue Grass League championship in the four–team league. With a record of 51–43 under managers Bob Corkhill, Pat Devereaux and Fritz Mueller, Paris finished just a 0.5 game ahead of the second place Cynthiana Cobblers (50–42) in the standings. No playoffs were held and the Blue Grass League permanently folded after the 1924 season.

The Blue Grass League did not return to play for the 1925 season. Paris, Kentucky has not hosted another minor league team.

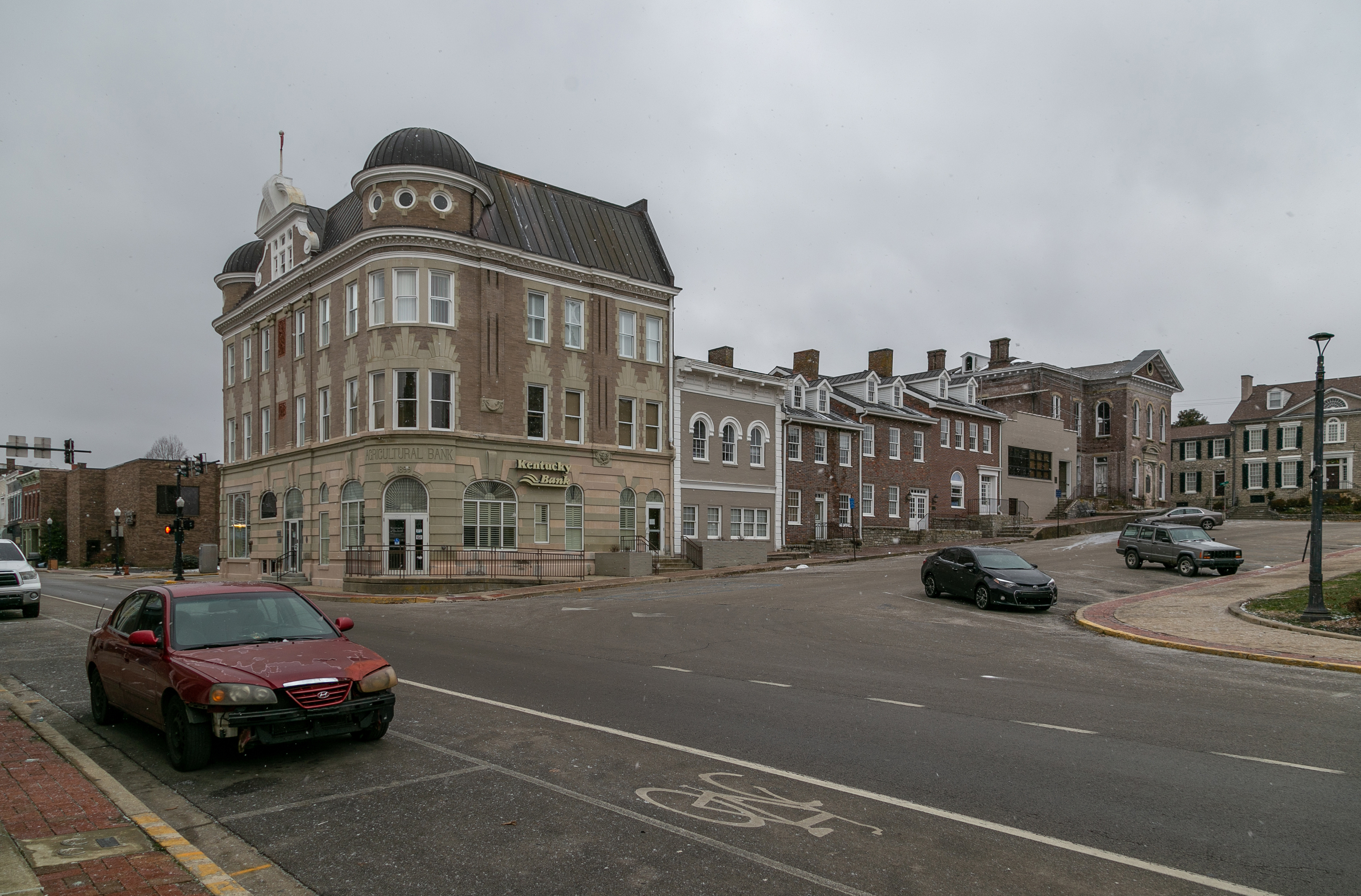
(2019) Courthouse Square Buildings. National Register of Historic Places. Paris, Kentucky

== The ballparks ==
Beginning in 1909, Paris teams hosted home minor league games at Bourbon County Park. The park is still in use as a public park and is located at 30 Legion Road in Paris, Kentucky. Local newspaper coverage in the era reported the Paris Bourbonites played some home games at White Park in 1911 and 1912.

== Timeline ==
| Year(s) | # Yrs. | Team | Level | League | Ballpark |
|---|---|---|---|---|---|
| 1909–1912 | 4 | Paris Bourbonites | Class D | Blue Grass League | Bourbon County Park |
| 1914 | 1 | Paris | Class D | Ohio State League | Bourbon County Park |
| 1922–1924 | 3 | Paris Bourbons | Class D | Blue Grass League | Bourbon County Park |

== Year–by–year records ==
| Year | Record | Finish | Manager | Playoffs/notes |
|---|---|---|---|---|
| 1909 | 61–57 | 3rd | Jeff Elgin / Henry Schmidt / James Barnett | No playoffs held |
| 1910 | 80–47 | 1st | Edward McKernan | League champions |
| 1911 | 71–44 | 1st | Edward McKernan | League champions |
| 1912 | 60–69 | 5th | Joe Lewis / Danning Harrell | No playoffs held |
| 1914 | 19–49 | NA | Charles Applegate / Red Munson | Team disbanded July 5 |
| 1922 | 36–28 | 1st | B. Goodman / Harold Willis | League Pennant; Lost in finals |
| 1923 | 45–47 | 4th | Nick Winger / Felix Cicona | No playoffs held |
| 1924 | 51–43 | 1st | Bob Corkhill; Pat Devereaux / Fritz Mueller | League champions |

== Notable alumni ==
- Ernie Alten (1914)
- Fred Applegate (1912)
- Win Ballou (1922)
- Harry Daubert (1914)
- Stump Edington (1910)
- Don Hurst (1924) 1932 NL RBI leader
- Al Kaiser (1910)
- Wally Mayer (1911)
- Ray Miner (1922, 1924)
- Fred Mollenkamp (1912)
- Ed Monroe (1912)
- Red Munson (1914, MGR)
- John Scheneberg (1909–1911)
- Jim Scott (1909–1910)
- Ralph Shafer (1914)
- George Shears (1911)
- Ray Shook (1912)

== See also ==
- Paris Bourbonites players
- Paris Bourbons players
