= Shelbyville Grays =

- 1908–1910; Shelbyville, Kentucky

Minor league affiliations
- Class: Class D (1908–1910)
- League: Blue Grass League (1908–1910)

Major league affiliations
- Team: None

Minor league titles
- League titles (0): None

Team data
- Name: Shelbyville Grays (1908–1910)
- Ballpark: Shelbyville Base Ball Park (1908–1910)

The Shelbyville Grays were a minor league baseball team based in Shelbyville, Kentucky. From 1908 to 1910, the Grays played exclusively as members of the Class D level Blue Grass League, hosting home games at the Shelbyville Base Ball Park.

Baseball Hall of Fame member Casey Stengel played for the 1910 Shelbyville Grays in his first professional season.

== History ==
Minor league baseball began in Shelbyville, Kentucky in 1908. Beginning play in the league on May 22, 1908, the "Shelbyville Grays" became charter members of the six–team Class D level Blue Grass League. The 1908 Grays placed fifth in the league final standings. With a record of 32–37, playing the season under manager Anton Kuhn, Shelbyville finished 14.0 games behind the first place Frankfort Statesmen. The Blue Grass League did not hold playoffs and the final records in the charter season were led by the Frankfort Statesmen (47–23), followed by the Lawrenceburg Distillers (33–35), Lexington Colts (37–31), Richmond Pioneers (36–34), Shelbyville (32–37) and Versailles Aristocrats/Winchester Reds (22–47). The Shelbyville team moniker is also listed as the "Millers" in some references.

Continuing play in the 1909 Blue Grass League, the Shelbyville Grays finished the season in last place. Shelbyville had a final record of 39–79 to place sixth under returning manager Anton Kuhn, finishing 35.5 games behind the first place Winchester Hustlers.

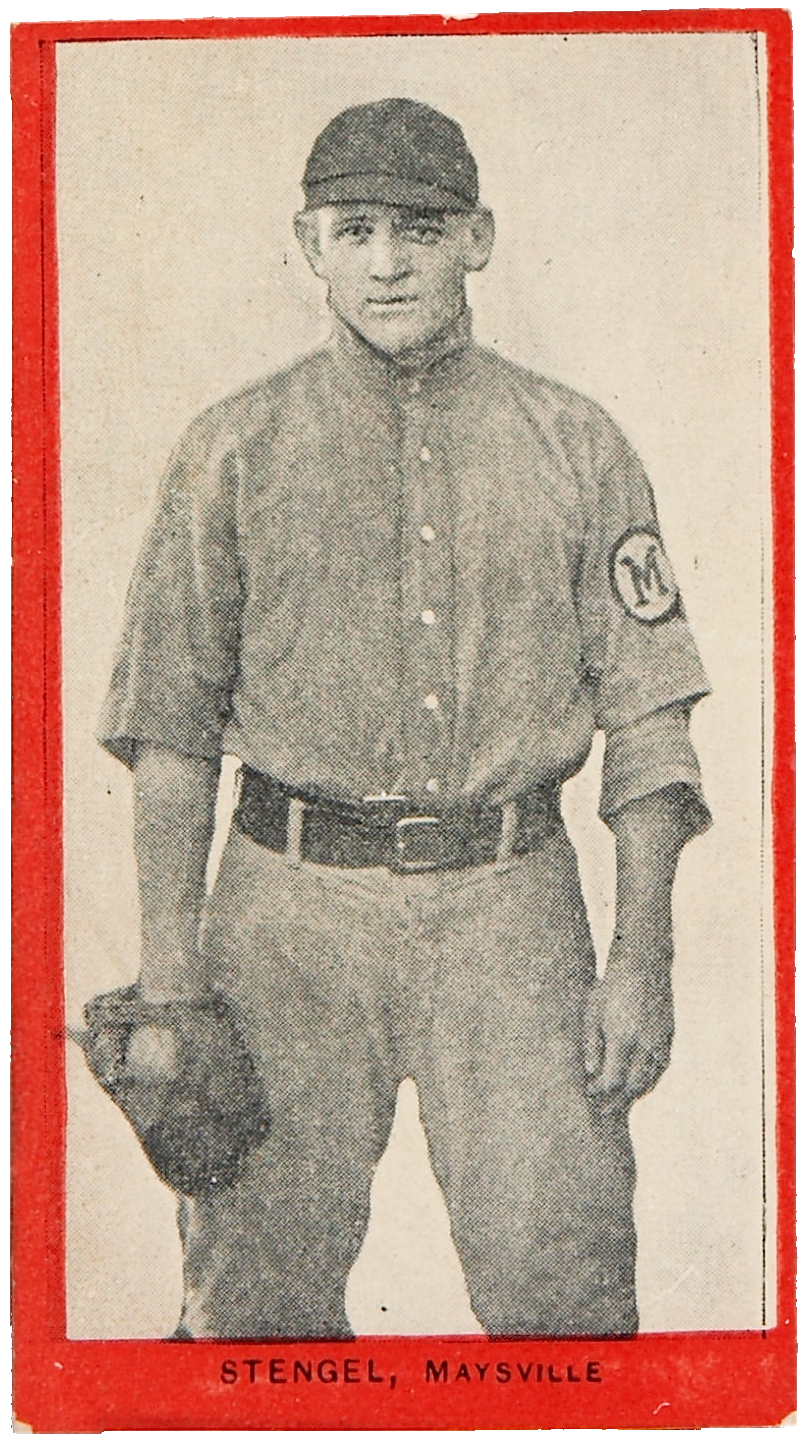
Casey Stengel as a member of the Maysville Rivermen, 1910

In their final season of play, the Shelbyville franchise relocated during the 1910 season and had a legendary Hall of Fame player on their roster. On August 24, 1910, the Shelbyville franchise moved to Maysville, Kentucky, as the team finished the 1910 season playing as the Maysville Rivermen. The Shelbyville/Maysville team finished in last place in the Class D level Blue Grass League. The team ended the season in sixth place with a 37–89 overall record and finished 42.5 games behind the first place Paris Bourbonites in the final standings. Anton Kuhn and Daniel Collins managed the 1910 team.

After beginning the 1910 season with the Kankakee Kays, Baseball Hall of Fame member Casey Stengel played for the 1910 Shelbyville Grays/Maysville Rivermen at age 19, hitting .223 for the team in 69 games and 233 at–bats.

The Maysville Rivermen continued play in the 1911 Blue Grass League season. Shelbyville, Kentucky has not hosted another minor league team.

Shelbyville fielded a semi–professional team in 1911, playing in the "Trolley League," composed of the Shelbyville, La Grange, Jeffersontown, Simpsonville, Lakeland, Ochsners, and Louisville Athletics teams.

== The ballpark ==
The Shelbyville Grays played their home games at the Shelbyville Base Ball Park. The ballpark had capacity of 2,000 after a new grandstand was erected for the 1910 season.

== Timeline ==
Year(s)	# Yrs.	Team	Level	League	Ballpark
1908–1910	3	Shelbyville Grays	Class D	Blue Grass League	Shelbyville Base Ball Park

== Year–by–year records ==
Year	Record	Finish	Manager	Playoffs/notes
1908	32–37	5th	Anton Kuhn	No playoffs held
1909	39–79	6th	Anton Kuhn	No playoffs held
1910	37–89	6th	Anton Kuhn / Daniel Collins	Moved to Maysville August 24

== Notable alumni ==
- Casey Stengel (1910) Inducted Baseball Hall of Fame, 1966
- Mack Allison (1909)
- Ralph Comstock (1909)
- Bill Cramer (1910)
- Ed Glenn (1909)
- Emil Huhn (1910)
- George Kircher (1910)

== See also ==
- Shelbyville Grays players
- Shelbyville Rivermen players
