= Lawrenceburg Distillers =

- 1908; Lawrenceburg, Kentucky

Minor league affiliations
- Class: Class D (1908)
- League: Blue Grass League (1908)

Major league affiliations
- Team: None

Minor league titles
- League titles (0): None

Team data
- Name: Lawrenceburg Distillers (1908)
- Ballpark: St. Charles Park (1908)

The Lawrenceburg Distillers were a minor league baseball team were based in Lawrenceburg, Kentucky. In 1908, the Distillers played as members of the Class D level Blue Grass League. The Distillers finished in fourth place in the 1908 standings, hosting home games at St. Charles Park.

== History ==
In 1908, the "Lawrenceburg Distillers" became charter members of the Class D level Blue Grass League and began play on May 22, 1908. Joining Lawrenceburg as charter members in the six–team league were the Frankfort Lawmakers, Lexington Colts, Richmond Pioneers, Shelbyville Millers and Versailles Aristocrats, beginning league play on May 22, 1908.

The "Distillers" nickname corresponds with local industry and history. Lawrenceburg has been the home to the Old Hickory Distillery since 1891, makers of Wild Turkey bourbon.

The Distillers ended the 1908 regular season in fourth place with a record of 33–35, playing under manager Guy Woodruff and finishing 13.0 games out of first place.

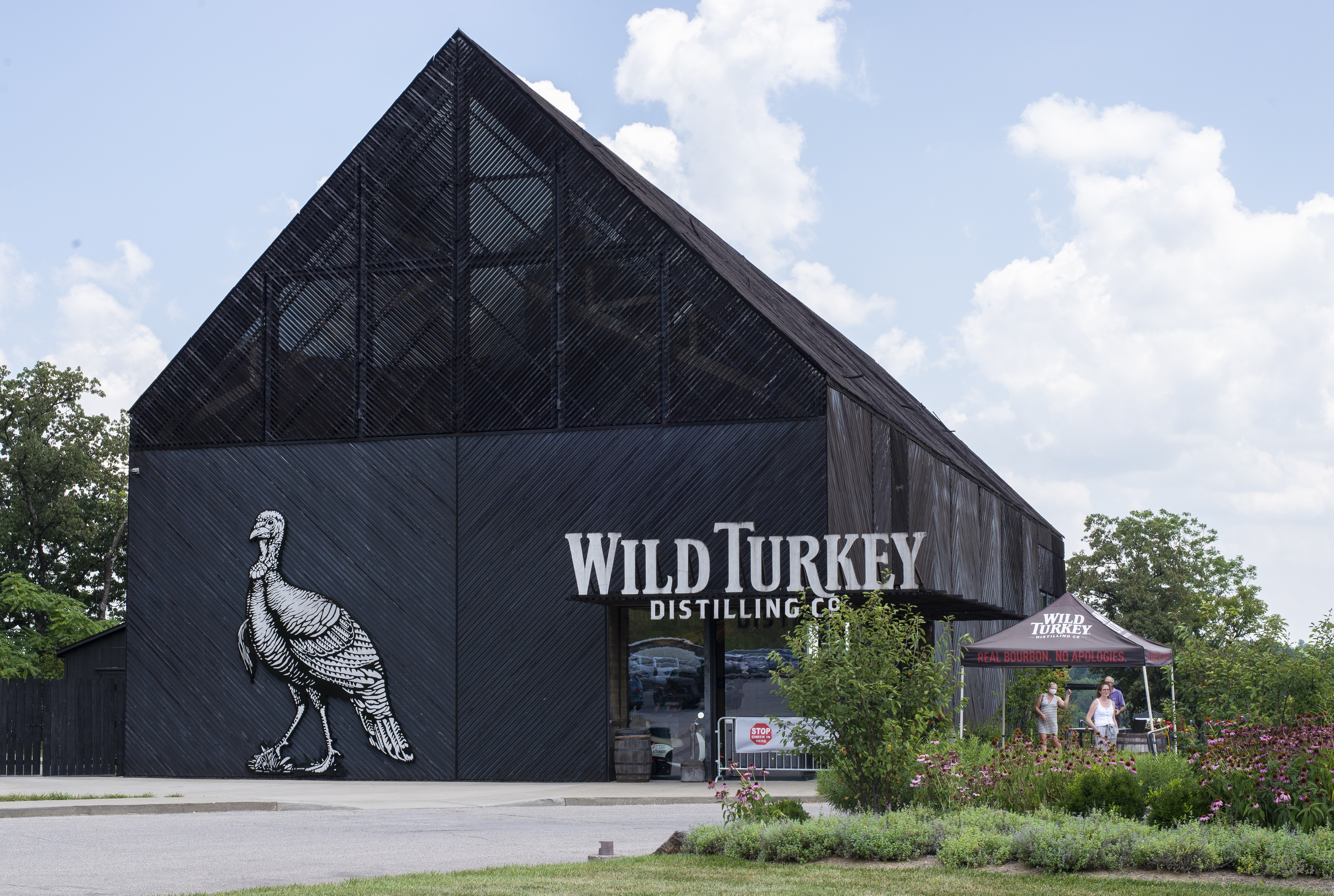
(2021) Wild Turkey Visitor Center. Lawrenceburg, Kentucky.

The Blue Grass League had no playoffs and the first place Frankfort Statesmen (47–23) finished 9.0 games ahead of the second place Lexington Colts (37–31) in the six–team league. They were followed by the Richmond Pioneers (36–34), Lawrenceburg (33–35), Shelbyville Millers (32–37) and Versailles Aristocrats/Winchester Reds (22–47).

Lawrenceburg, Kentucky did not field a team in the 1909 Blue Grass league, replaced in league play by the Paris Bourbonites. Lawrenceburg has not hosted another minor league team.

== The ballpark ==
The Lawrenceburg Distillers hosted 1908 minor league home games at St. Charles Park.

== Year–by–year record ==
Year	Record	Finish	Manager	Playoffs/notes
1908	33–35	4th	Guy Woodruff	No playoffs held

== Notable alumni ==
- Rudy Sommers (1908)
- George Yantz (1908)
- Lawrenceburg (minor league baseball) players
