= Lexington Reds =

- 1922–1923; (1922-1924); Lexington, Kentucky

Minor league affiliations
- Class: Class D (1922–1924)
- League: Blue Grass League (1922–1924)

Major league affiliations
- Team: None

Minor league titles
- League titles (0): None
- Wild card berths (0): None

Team data
- Name: Lexington Reds (1922-1923); Lexington Studebakers (1924)
- Ballpark: Stivers Park (1922–1924)

The Lexington Reds were a minor league baseball team based in Lexington, Kentucky.

From 1922 to 1924, Lexington teams played exclusively as members of the Class D level Blue Grass League. After two seasons of playing as the "Reds," the 1924 Lexington became known as the "Studebakers." The nickname change occurred after the team owner reached an agreement with a local car dealership.

The minor league Lexington Reds evolved from the semi-professional "Lexington Reds," which had future Commissioner of Baseball leader Happy Chandler and Baseball Hall of Fame member Earle Combs as teammates.

The Lexington Reds and Studebakers teams hosted minor league home games at Stivers Park. The ballpark later served as the home ballpark of the "Lexington Hard Hitters" team of the Negro leagues beginning in 1930.

== History ==
After Lexington first hosted a minor league baseball in 1885, with a team in the independent Interstate League, the Lexington Reds were preceded in minor league play by the 1916 Lexington Colts, who played their final season after a tenure as members of the Class D level Ohio State League.

Following the demise of the minor league Colts, the Lexington "Reds" began play as a semi-professional team for multiple seasons. Future Commissioner of Baseball leader Happy Chandler and Baseball Hall of Fame member Earle Combs were teammates playing for the semi-pro Reds.

The 1922 Lexington Reds resumed minor league baseball play. The Reds began play as members of the six–team Class D level Blue Grass League. Some sources have the 1922 team moniker as the "Studebakers." The Cynthiana Merchants, Maysville Cardinals, Mount Sterling Essex, Paris Bourbons and Winchester Dodgers teams joined Lexington in beginning league play on April 23, 1922.

Beginning play in the 1922 Blue Grass League, the Reds finished in a last place tie in the regular season standings. In the overall standings, Lexington tied with the Winchester Dodgers, with both teams having identical records of 28–36. The Reds played the season under the direction of managers Pat Devereaux and Jim Park, finishing 8.0 games behind the first place Paris Bourbons in the overall regular season standings. The Maysville Cardinals, with a 16–6 record, won the first half standings and Cynthiana, with a 25–17 record, won the second half standings, with the Maysville winning the championship playoff.

The Reds had several 1922 games changed or altered by Blue Grass League President Thomas M. Russell. Lexington's June 4, 1922, home game against Mt. Sterling was declared a “no contest” and was ordered to be replayed. Additionally, Russell ruled Lexington had used ineligible players in three victories and declared those games forfeits: August 27 (forfeit to Mt Sterling), September 9 (forfeit to Winchester), and September 30 (forfeit to Cynthiana). Lexington then forfeited its final three games of the season when the Reds failed to appear on October 2 and 3 for games against Mt. Sterling and on October 4 against Winchester. The final three games were forfeited after team owner Jesse Morton sold players who were popular with teammates and fans. The remaining players quit and the franchise was forced to forfeit the final three games of the season.

The Reds continued play in the 1923 Blue Grass League season. With a 44–49 record, the Reds finished in fifth place under manager Doug Harbison and ended the season 8.0 games behind the first place Cynthiana Cobblers in the six–team league. The 1923 team was also referred to as the "Reos." Cynthiana finished 1.0 game ahead of the second place Winchester Dodgers in the final standings. No playoffs were held in 1923.

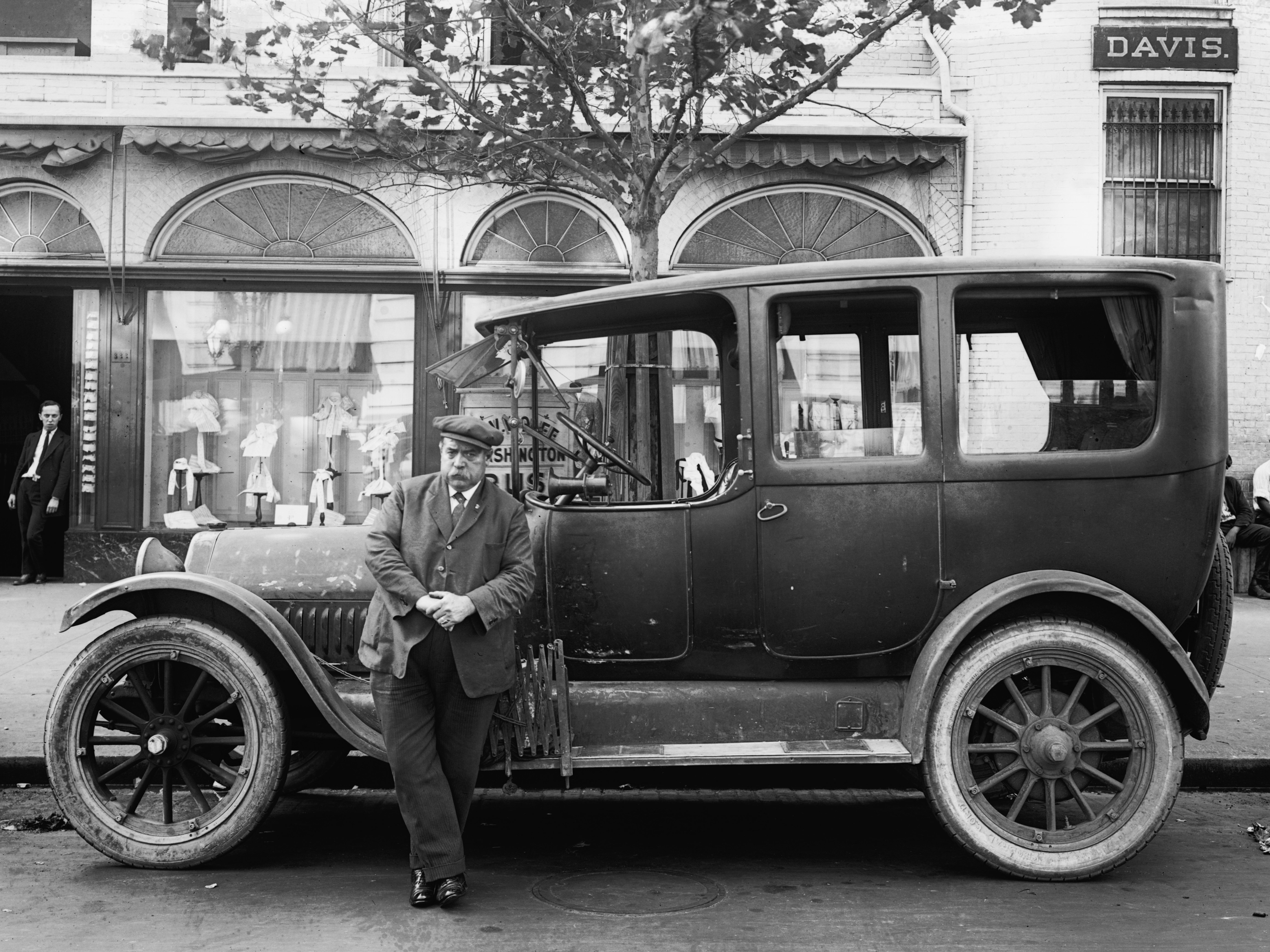
(1921–1922) Studebaker car. The 1924 Lexington team was renamed to the "Studebakers."

In their final season of play, the 1924 Blue Grass League reduced from six teams to four, with Cynthiana, Paris and Winchester continuing league play with Lexington. The Lexington team continued league play and was known as the "Studebakers." The name change occurred after team owner Jesse Morton reached a sponsorship agreement with a local car dealership.

The Studebakers ended the season in third place in the final standings. With a record of 43–50 under managers Jesse Young and Jim Viox in the four–team Blue Grass League, Lexington finished 7.5 games behind the first place Paris Boosters. No playoffs were held following the conclusion of the 1924 regular season and the Blue Grass League permanently folded after the season.

Lexington next hosted minor league baseball in 1954, when the Lexington Colts played the season as members of the Class D level Mountain States League.

== The ballpark ==
The Lexington minor league teams hosted minor league Blue Ridge League home games at Stivers Park. Stivers Park later served as the home ballpark of the Lexington Hard Hitters of the Negro leagues from 1930 to 1932. The Hard Hitters were a member of the Blue Grass Colored Baseball League.

== Timeline ==
Year(s)	# Yrs.	Team	Level	League	Ballpark
1922-1923	2	Lexington Reds	Class D	Blue Grass League	Stivers Park
1924	1	Lexington Studebakers	Class D	Blue Grass League	Stivers Park

== Year–by–year records ==
Year	Record	Finish	Manager	Playoffs
1922	28–36	5th (t)	Pat Devereaux / Jim Park	Did not qualify
1923	44–49	5th	Doug Harbison	No playoffs held
1924	43–50	3rd	Jesse Young / Jim Viox	No playoffs held

== Notable alumni ==
- Eddie Bacon (1922)
- Johnny Gill (1924)
- Jim Park (1922, MGR)
- Jim Viox (1924, MGR)

== See also ==
- Lexington Reds players
