= Frankfort, Kentucky minor league baseball history =

Local history of Minor League Baseball

Frankfort, Kentucky minor league baseball teams
- 1885–1916; (1885, 1908–1912, 1915–1916); Frankfort, Kentucky

Minor league affiliations
- Class: Independent (1885); Class D (1908–1912, 1915–1916)
- League: Interstate League (1885); Blue Grass League (1908–1912); Ohio State League (1915–1916)

Major league affiliations
- Team: None

Minor league titles
- League titles (2): 1908; 1912

Team data
- Name: Frankfort (1895); Frankfort Statesmen (1908–1911); Frankfort Lawmakers (1912); Frankfort Old Taylors (1915–1916)
- Ballpark: Unknown

Minor league baseball teams were based in Frankfort, Kentucky in various seasons between 1885 and 1916. Frankfort teams played as members of the Interstate League in 1885, the Blue Grass League from 1908 to 1912 and Ohio State League in 1915 and 1916. Frankfort won Blue Grass League championships in 1908 and 1912.

== History ==
Frankfort began hosting minor league baseball play in 1885, when the Frankfort team played as members of the six–team Interstate League. Shenkel was the Frankfort manager. The 1885 standings are unknown.

In 1908, the "Frankfort Statesmen" became charter members of the Class D level Blue Grass League and won the league championship. Frankfort finished the regular season in first with a record of 47–23, playing under manager Neal Kennedy. The league had no playoffs and Frankfort finished 9.0 games ahead of the 2nd place Lexington Colts in the six–team league. The charter teams were Frankfort (47–23), Lawrenceburg Distllers (33–35), Lexington Colts (37–31), Richmond Pioneers (36–34), Shelbyville Millers (32–37) and Versailles Aristocrats/Winchester Reds (22–47). The Frankfort team was also known as the "Lawmakers" in some references. Both monikers reflect Frankford as the State Capitol of the state of Kentucky.

Continuing play in the 1909 Blue Grass League, the Frankfort Statesmen ended the season in fourth place. Frankfort had a final record of 56–60, finishing 17.5 games behind the first place Winchester Hustlers, playing under managers Neal Kennedy and Ben Marshall.

The 1910 season saw the team finish in fifth place in the Class D level Blue Grass League. The Frankfort Statesmen finished with a 60–61 record and were 17.0 games behind the first place Paris Bourbonites. Wallace Warren and Danny Harrell managed the 1910 Frankfort Statesmen.

In the 1911 Blue Grass League season the Frankfort Statesmen finished with a record of 48–65 The team placed fifth and finished 22.0 games behind the first place Paris Bourbonites under manager Ed Coleman. Frankfort's Ovid Nicholson stole 111 bases and scored 128 runs. The next stolen base league leader had 54. Nicholson was called up by the Pittsburgh Pirates after the conclusion of the Frankfort season.

The 1912 Frankfort Lawmakers won the Blue Grass League championship in the final season of the league. With a 85–42 record under manager Ollie Gfroerer in the final standings, Frankfort finished in first place. Following Frankfort were the Lexington Colts (60–65), Maysville Rivermen (82–47), Paris Bourbonites (60–69), Richmond Pioneers (66–64) and Mt. Sterling Orphans (31–97). The Blue Grass League folded following the 1912 season and Frankfort was unable to defend their championship.

Frankfort resumed minor league play in 1915. Frankfort became members of the Class D level Ohio State League. The Frankfort Old Taylors began play in the six–team league and finished the 1915 season in fourth place with a 45–65 record. The Old Taylors finished 24.5 behind the first place Portsmouth Cobblers, while playing under managers Pat Bohannon and Jack Hayden.

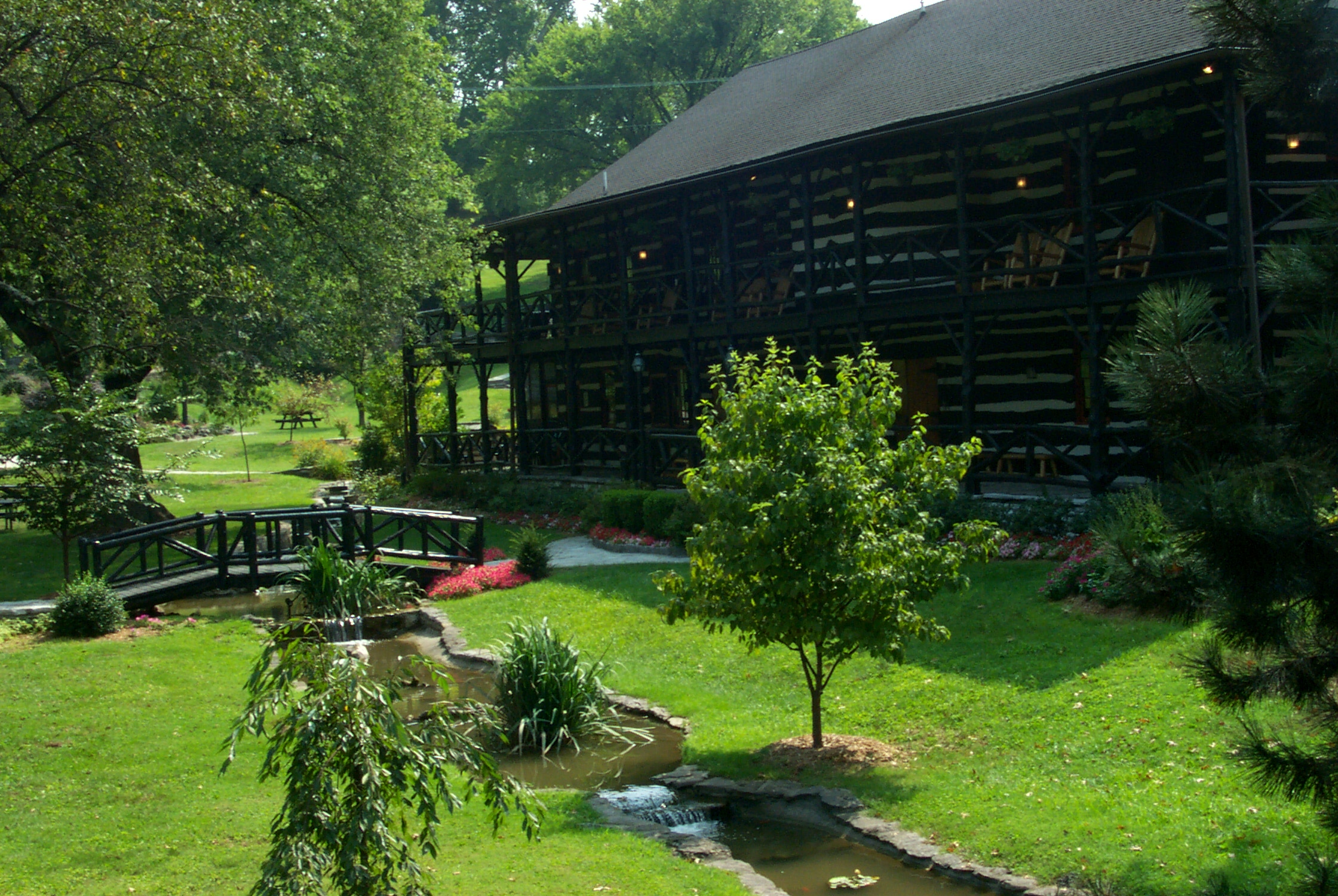
(2007) Buffalo Trace Distillery grounds. National Register of Historic Places. Frankfort, Kentucky

The "Old Taylors" moniker was in reference to local industry, as Frankfort was home to the Buffalo Trace Distillery, makers of Old Taylor Bourbon. The 1916 Ohio State League members were the Charleston Senators (58–63), Chillicothe Babes/Huntington/Maysville Angels (58–55), Frankfort Old Taylors (45–65), Ironton Nailers (47–69), Lexington Colts (63–48 )and Portsmouth Cobblers (71–42).

In their final season of play, the 1916 Frankfort Old Taylors folded during the season. On July 6, 1916, Frankfort folded with a 24–35 record under manager James "Ducky" Holmes. The Ohio State League permanently folded on July 16, 1916.

Frankfort, Kentucky has not hosted another minor league team.

== The ballpark ==
The name of the Frankfort teams' home ballpark are not known. The campus of Kentucky State University at Alumni Field and State Stadium were venues in use in the era.

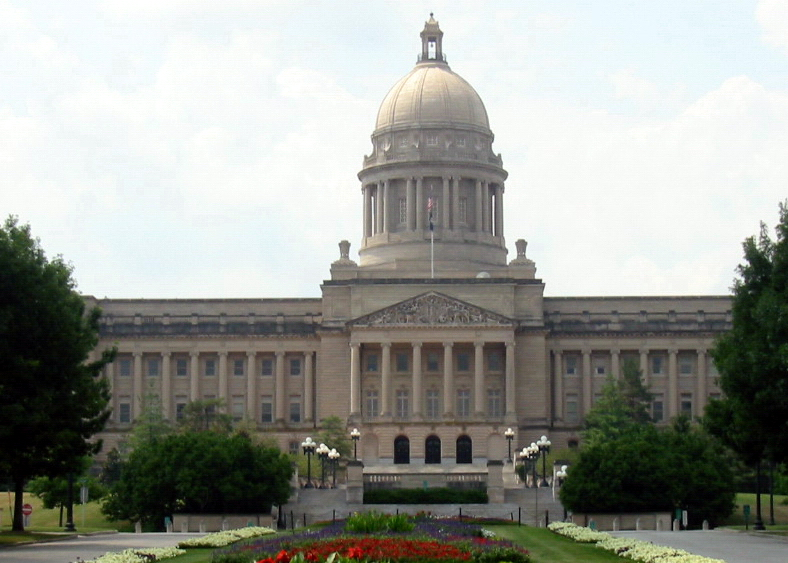
(2002) Kentucky State Capitol. Frankfort, Kentucky

== Timeline ==
Year(s)	# Yrs.	Team	Level	League
1885	1	Frankfort	Independent	Interstate League
1908–1911	4	Frankfort Statesmen	Class D	Blue Grass League
1912	1	Frankfort Lawmakers	Class D	Blue Grass League
1915–1916	2	Frankfort Old Taylors	Class D	Ohio State League

== Year-by-year records ==
Year	Record	Finish	Manager	Playoffs
1885	00–00	NA	Shenkel	Record and standings unknown
1908	47–23	1st	N.G. Kennedy	League champions
1909	56–60	4th	N.G. Kennedy /Ben Marshall	No playoffs held
1910	60–61	5th	Wallace Warren / Danny Harrell	No playoffs held
1911	48–65	5th	Ed Coleman	No playoffs held
1912	85–42	1st	Ollie Gfroerer	League champions
1915	45–65	4th	Pat Bohannon /Jack Hayden	Did not qualify
1916	24–35	NA	Ducky Holmes	Team folded July 6 League folded July 16

== Notable alumni ==
- Eddie Bacon (1915)
- Jack Bellman (1885)
- Bill Cramer (1910–1912)
- Dick Crutcher (1908–1909)
- Ed Glenn (1909)
- Ernie Gust (1912)
- Ducky Holmes (1916, MGR)
- Jim McLaughlin (1885)
- Ed Monroe (1915)
- Ovid Nicholson (1911–1912)
- George Yantz (1909)

== See also ==
- Frankfort (minor league baseball) players
- Frankfort Lawmakers players
- Frankfort Old Taylors players
- Frankfort Statesmen players
