= Fred Toney =

American baseball player (1888–1953)

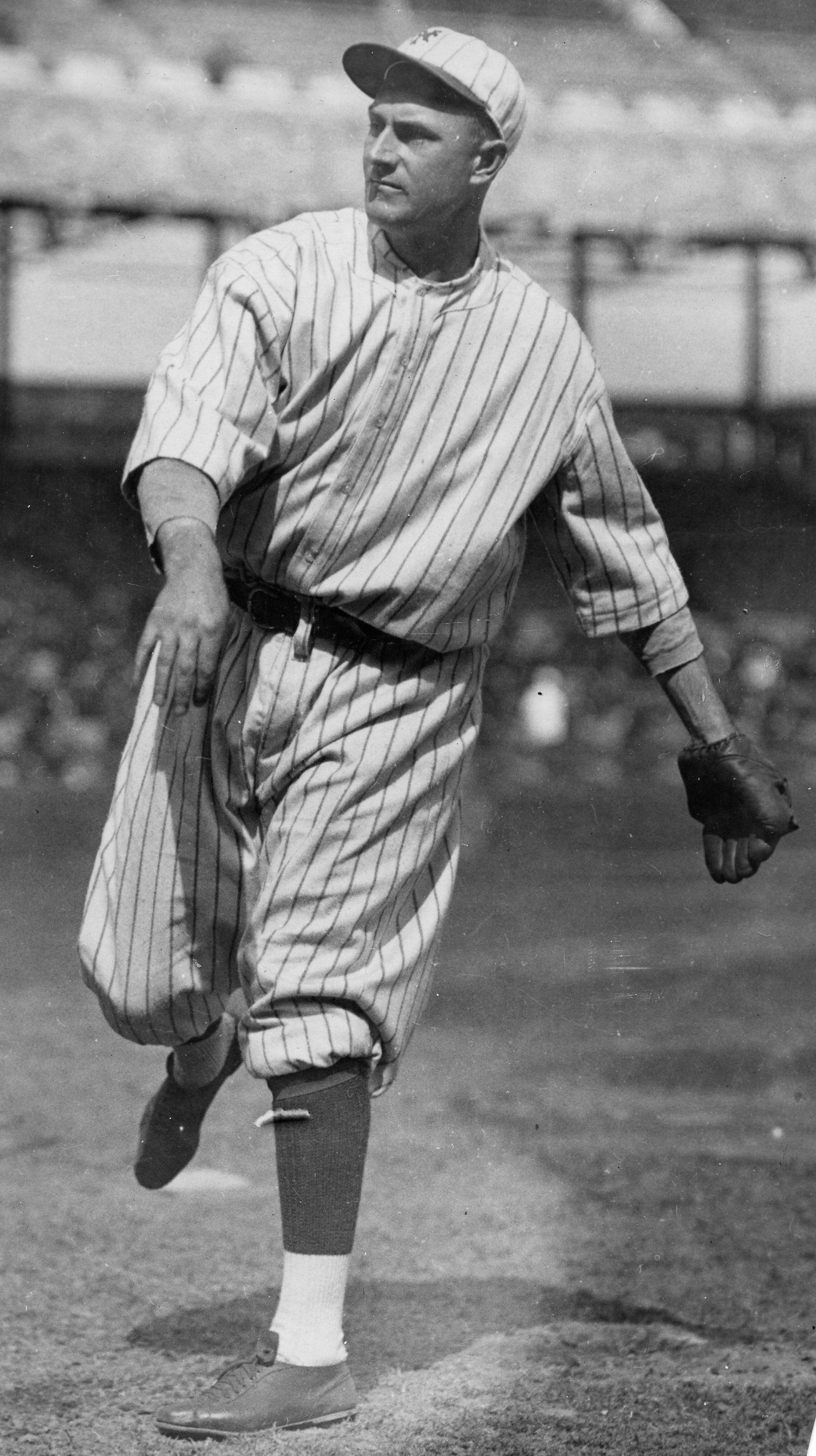
- Pitcher
- Born: December 11, 1888; Nashville, Tennessee, U.S.
- Died: March 11, 1953 (aged 64); Nashville, Tennessee, U.S.
- Batted: Right Threw: Right

MLB debut
- April 15, 1911, for the Chicago Cubs

Last MLB appearance
- September 29, 1923, for the St. Louis Cardinals

MLB statistics
- Win–loss record: 139–102
- Earned run average: 2.69
- Strikeouts: 718
- Stats at Baseball Reference

Teams
- Chicago Cubs (1911–1913); Cincinnati Reds (1915–1918); New York Giants (1918–1922); St. Louis Cardinals (1923)

Career highlights and awards
- World Series champion (1921); NL saves leader (1918); Pitched a 10-inning no-hitter on May 2, 1917

Fred Toney (December 11, 1888 – March 11, 1953) was an American right-handed pitcher in Major League Baseball for the Chicago Cubs, Cincinnati Reds, New York Giants and St. Louis Cardinals from 1911 to 1923. His career record was 139 wins, 102 losses, and a 2.69 earned run average. Toney twice won 20 games in a season (1917, 1920) and also led the National League in saves in 1918.

== Career ==
=== Minor leagues ===
Fred Toney was born in Nashville, Tennessee, on December 11, 1888. As a youth he reportedly developed arm strength while working on a farm, using his spare time to throw rocks across the Cumberland River.

Toney broke into baseball in 1909, when he began pitching in the Blue Grass League, a newly formed circuit of semi-professional baseball clubs based in small Kentucky towns. While pitching for the Winchester Hustlers, Toney was spotted by Chicago Cubs scout George Huff, who signed him to a contract.

Highlights of Toney's minor league tenure included a victory in a 17-inning no hitter during the 1909 season. On May 10, 1909, while pitching for the Hustlers, he defeated the Lexington Colts in 17 innings, 1–0, striking out 19 batters and walking only one, before Winchester finally scored a run on a squeeze play in the bottom of the 17th.

=== Rookie year ===
Toney made his major league debut in 1911, following an appearance in an exhibition game against the University of Notre Dame in which he faced nine batters and struck out six. One sports journalist wrote of the rookie:

"Toney is from Tennessee, and he looks the part. He is long, lean, and as strong as some of the squirrel whiskey they make in the mountains of said state. What he did to the collegians was sinful."

The young Toney possessed a first-rate fastball and was heralded by some observers as "a second Walter Johnson" upon his arrival in the league. He did not learn how to throw an overhand curveball until the spring of 1911, when he developed the pitch in Cubs training camp.

Before he pitched a single major league game, Cubs team officials heralded the 6'2" Toney as a future star in the making. Club treasurer Charlie Williams said of the big rookie:

"I believe that Toney will prove to be the sensation in the National League the coming season. He shows up well so far and has all the earmarks of a great pitcher.... He is modest and as cool as a veteran when he is on the slab. His size is a great advantage to him, and he has speed enough to keep all the batters guessing, even if he had nothing else with it. I have been more impressed with the work of Toney than any young pitcher that has broken into the game with the Cubs for years."

Toney was unimpressive in his major league debut on April 15 against the St. Louis Cardinals in a game ending after ten innings in a 3–3 tie. Pitching on a windy day in front of 15,000 fans, Toney struggled with his control, giving up two extra-base hits and a walk before being lifted in the bottom of the third inning.

=== Highlights ===
On May 2, 1917, at the ballpark now known as Wrigley Field, Toney dueled with Hippo Vaughn of the Chicago Cubs during nine hitless innings. In the top of the tenth, the Reds scored on a couple of hits after Vaughn had retired the first batter, while Toney continued to hold the Cubs hitless in the bottom of the inning, winning the game for the Reds. With changes to the scoring rules in recent years, this game is no longer considered as a no-hitter for Vaughn; but it is still the only occasion in Major League history in which a regulation nine innings was played without either team logging a hit.

On July 1, 1917, Toney pitched two complete-game, three-hitters for victories in a doubleheader against the Pittsburgh Pirates, to set a record for fewest hits allowed in a double header by a Major League pitcher.

Toney also holds the record for the longest no-hitter in organized baseball history.

== Legal Challenges ==
In January 1919, Toney, was acquitted of charges of evading the Selective Service Act, but also pleaded guilty to traveling with a woman in violation of the Mann Act, whom he falsely claimed was his wife, from Louisville, Kentucky to Cincinnati, Ohio where they lived together while he played for the Cincinnati Reds. He was sentenced to four months in jail.

Toney also later testified before the grand jury investigating the Black Sox Scandal that former teammeate Heinie Zimmerman offered him a bribe to a throw a game against the Cubs.

== See also ==
- List of Major League Baseball annual saves leaders
- List of Major League Baseball no-hitters

| Preceded by George Mogridge | No-hitter pitcher May 2, 1917 | Succeeded by Ernie Koob |
