= Mt. Sterling Essex =

- 1922–1923; (1912, 1922–1923); Mount Sterling, Kentucky

Minor league affiliations
- Class: Class D (1912, 1922–1923)
- League: Blue Grass League (1912, 1922–1923)

Major league affiliations
- Team: None

Minor league titles
- League titles (0): None

Team data
- Name: Mt. Sterling Orphans (1912); Mt. Sterling Essex (1922–1923)
- Ballpark: Montgomery County Fairgrounds (1922–1923)

The Mt. Sterling Essex were a minor league baseball team based in Mount Sterling, Kentucky. In 1912 and from 1922 to 1923, Mt. Sterling teams played exclusively as members of the Class D level Blue Grass League, hosting home games at the Montgomery County Fairgrounds. The team played as the "Orphans" in 1912.

== History ==
In 1912, Mt. Sterling, Kentucky first hosted minor league baseball, when the Mt. Sterling Orphans played a partial season as members of the six–team Class D level Blue Grass League, finishing in last place in their initial season.

On June 8, 1912, the Kentucky-based Winchester Hustlers, with a record of 13–24, moved to Nicholasville, Kentucky. After compiling a 3–27 record while based in Nicholasville, the franchise moved to Mt. Sterling on June 26, 1912, to complete the season, becoming known as the Mt. Sterling "Orphans." Under managers Courtney McBrair and Bob Spade, the Orphans finished the 1912 season with an overall record of 31–97, placing sixth in the six–team Blue Grass League. The Orphans finished 54.5 games behind the first place Frankfort Lawmakers (85–42) in the final standings. The Lexington Colts (60–65), Maysville Rivermen (82–47), Paris Bourbonites (60–69) and Richmond Pioneers (66–64) all finished ahead of Mt. Sterling. It was noted by the Spalding Guide that the Mount Sterling Orphans team "was in poor shape all of the year." The Blue Grass League did not return to play in the 1913 season.

After a decade absence, the Blue Grass League reformed in 1922. The "Mt. Sterling Essex" resumed as members of the reformed six–team Class D level Blue Grass League. The 1922 league franchises were the Cynthiana Merchants (34–30), Lexington Reds (28–36), Maysville Cardinals (33–28), Mount Sterling Essex (30–31), Paris Mammoths (36–28) and Winchester Dodgers (28–36).

The team's use of the "Essex" moniker corresponds with Mt. Sterling being named after Stirling, Scotland, which was the former home to early settlers. According to an article in the local newspaper, The Mt. Sterling Advocate, the name was chosen after the Ragan-Gay Motor Company offered to donate the uniforms.

Resuming play in the 1922 Blue Grass League, the Mt. Sterling Essex placed fourth in the overall standings. With a record of 30–31, playing the season under player/manager Hod Eller, the Essex finished 4.5 games behind the first place Paris Bourbons in the overall standings. The Maysville Cardinals, with a 16–6 record, won the first half standings and Cynthiana Cobblers, with a 25–17 record, won the second half standings. Maysville defeated Cynthiana in the playoffs to win the championship. Mt. Sterling played home games at the Montgomery County Fairgrounds and did not qualify for the playoffs.

In their final season of play, the 1923 Essex finished last in the Blue Grass League standings. With a 38–54 record, Mt. Sterling finished in sixth place, playing under managers Charles Ellis and Hod Eller. The Essex finished 13.5 games behind the first place Cynthiana Cobblers in the final standings of the six–team league. No playoffs were held in 1923.

Mt. Sterling permanently folded after the 1923 season, as the Blue Grass League reduced to four teams for their final season of 1924.

Mt. Sterling, Kentucky has not hosted another minor league team.

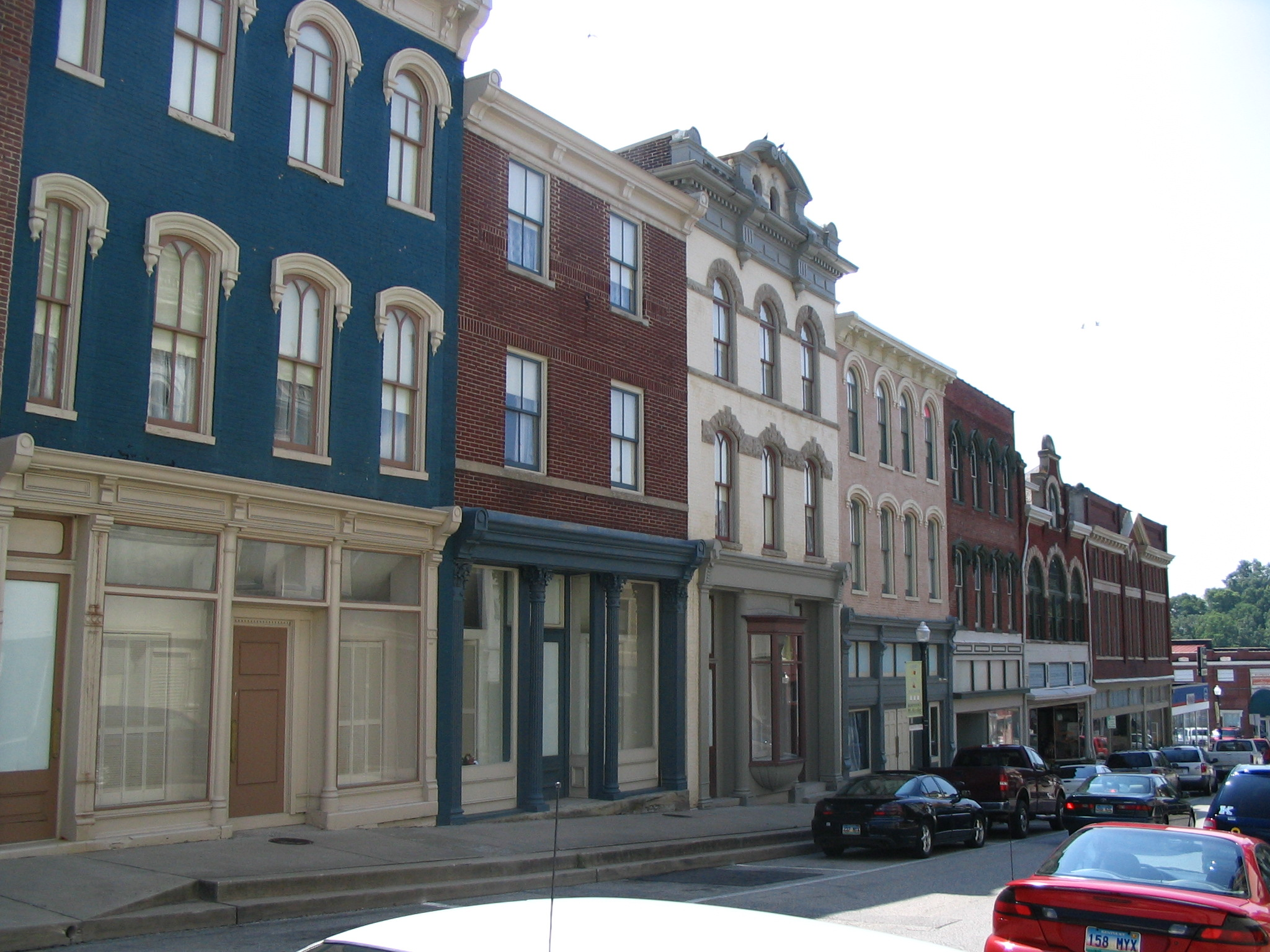
(2005) Downtown. National Register of Historic Places. Mount Sterling, Kentucky.

== The ballpark ==
The Mt. Sterling Essex teams hosted home minor league games at the Montgomery County Fairgrounds in 1922 and 1923. The ballpark had a small grandstand and was located near the racetrack. Today, the fairgrounds are still in use as home to the annual Montgomery County Fair. The Montgomery County Fairgrounds are located on U.S. Route 60, Mt. Sterling, Kentucky.

== Timeline ==
Year(s)	# Yrs.	Team	Level	League	Ballpark
1912	1	Mt. Sterling Orphans	Class D	Blue Grass League	Montgomery County Fairgrounds
1922–1923	2	Mt. Sterling Essex	Class D	Blue Grass League	Montgomery County Fairgrounds

== Year–by–year records ==
Year	Record	Finish	Manager	Playoffs
1912	31–97	6th	Courtney McBrair / Bob Spade	No playoffs held
1922	30–31	4th	Hod Eller	Did not qualify
1923	38–54	6th	Charles Ellis / Hod Eller	No playoffs held

== Notable alumni ==
- Hod Eller (1922–1923, MGR)
- Mount Sterling Essex players
