= Winchester Dodgers =

- 1922–1924; Winchester, Kentucky

Minor league affiliations
- Class: Class D (1922–1924)
- League: Blue Grass League (1922–1924)

Major league affiliations
- Team: None

Minor league titles
- League titles (0): None

Team data
- Name: Winchester Dodgers (1922–1924)
- Ballpark: Garner's Park (1922–1924)

The Winchester Dodgers were a minor league baseball team based in Winchester, Kentucky. From 1922 to 1924, the Dodgers played exclusively as members of the Class D level Blue Grass League, having been preceded in the league by the 1908 to 1912 Winchester Hustlers. Winchester hosted home games at Garner's Park.

== History ==
The Dodgers were immediately preceded in minor league play by the 1912 Winchester Hustlers, who played a partial season as members of the Class D level Blue Grass League before relocating during the season to eventually become the Mt. Sterling Orphans. The Blue Grass League folded following the 1912 season and did not return to play until 1922.

After a decade absence, the 1922 Winchester Dodgers resumed play as members of the six–team, Class D level Blue Grass League, which reformed. The Cynthiana Merchants, Lexington Reds, Maysville Cardinals, Mount Sterling Essex and Paris Bourbons joined Winchester in beginning league play on April 23, 1922.

Beginning play in the 1922 Blue Grass League, the Dodgers finished in a tie for last place. In the overall standings, Winchester placed fifth with their record of 28–36 under managers Walter Van Winkle and Howie Camnitz. The Dodgers and the Lexington Reds ended the season with identical records and finished 8.0 games behind the first place Paris Bourbons in the overall standings, with neither team reaching the playoff. In the 1922 Finals, Maysville defeated Cynthiana to win the championship.

Continuing play in the 1923 Blue Grass League season, the Dodgers finished in as the league runner-up. With a 53–44 record, the Dodgers finished in second place under manager Pat Devereaux. Winchester finished just 1.0 game behind the first place Cynthiana Cobblers in the final standings of the six–team league. No playoffs were held in 1923.

In their final season of play, the 1924 Winchester Dodgers finished last in the final standings. With a record of 43–51 under manager George Bell in the four–team Blue Grass League, Winchester finished in fourth place, ending the season 8.0 games behind the first place Paris Boosters. No playoffs were held. Pitcher Weldon of Winchester led the Blue Grass League with a 14–3 record.

The Blue Grass League permanently folded after the 1924 season. Winchester has not hosted another minor league team.

== The ballpark ==
Winchester teams hosted minor league home games at Garner's Park. The ballpark had a capacity of 1,000 and was noted to be near the business district in Winchester. Today, "College Park" is in use as a public park, with a playing field and amenities, located at the end of Garner Street. College Park is located at 30 Wheeler Avenue.

== Timeline ==
Year(s)	# Yrs.	Team	Level	League	Ballpark
1922–1924	3	Winchester Dodgers	Class D	Blue Grass League	Garner's Park

== Year–by–year records ==
Year	Record	Finish	Manager	Playoffs
1922	28–36	5th (t)	Walter Van Winkle / Howie Camnitz	Did not qualify
1923	55–44	2nd	Pat Devereaux	No playoff held
1924	43–51	4th	George Bell	No playoffs held

== Notable alumni ==
- Howie Camnitz (1922, MGR)
- Walter Van Winkle (1922, MGR), (1924)
