= 1944 United States Senate election in Kentucky =

- November 6, 1944
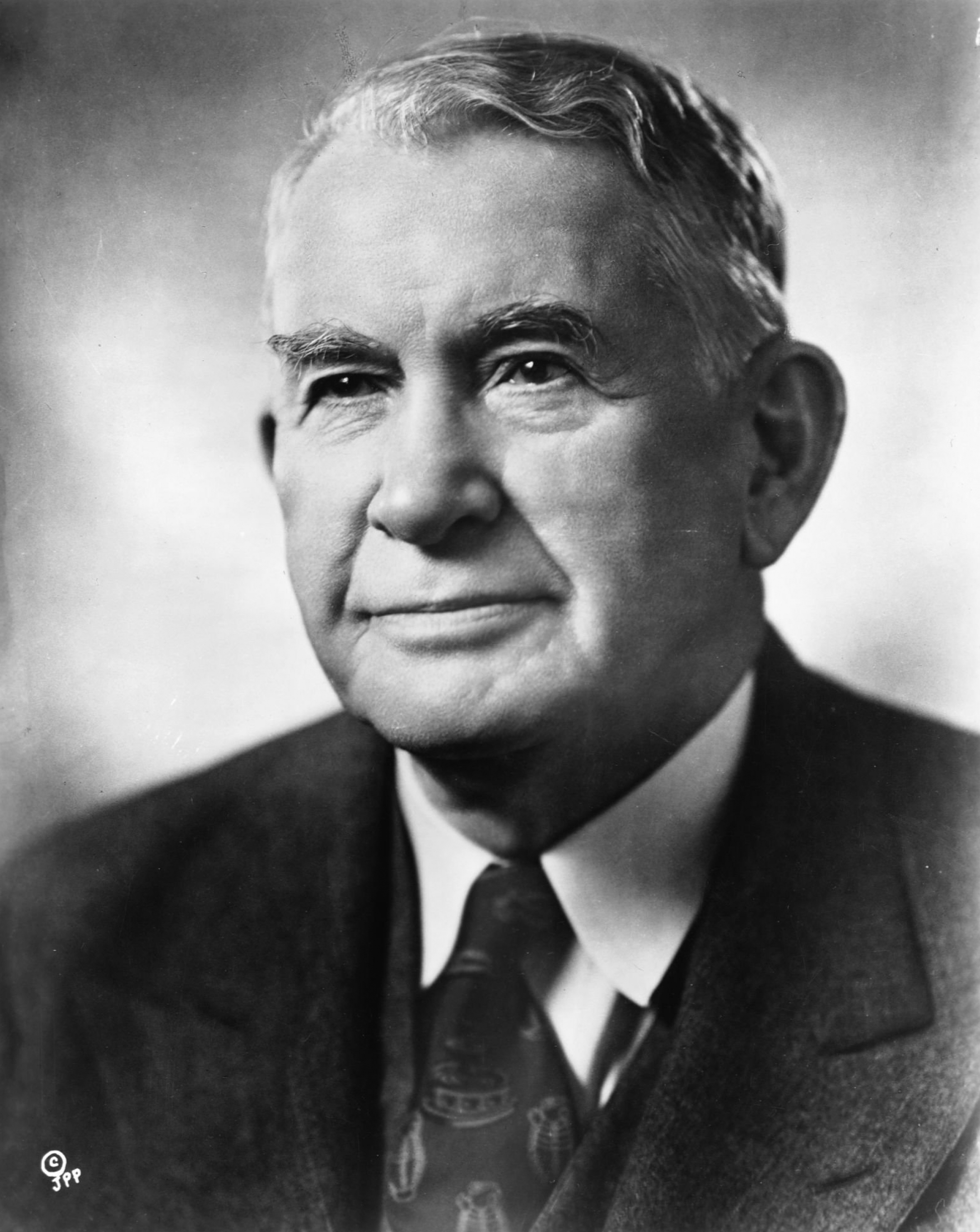

Nominee	Alben Barkley	James Park
Party	Democratic	Republican
Popular vote	464,053	380,425
Percentage	54.8%	44.9%
- County results Barkley: 50–60% 60–70% 70–80% 80–90% Park: 50–60% 60–70% 70–80% 80–90%
U.S. senator before election
Alben Barkley
Democratic
Elected U.S. Senator
Alben Barkley
Democratic

The regular-term 1944 United States Senate election in Kentucky took place on November 6, 1944. Democratic Senator and Senate Majority Leader Alben Barkley was re-elected to a fourth term in office over Republican James Park.

== Republican primary ==
=== Candidates ===
- Clarence Bartlett
- G. Tom Hawkins
- James Park
- Silas A. Sullivan

=== Results ===
Primary results by county Park: 30%–40%; 40%–50%; 50%–60%; 60%–70%; 70%–80%; 80%–90%; 90%–100%; Bartlett: 30%–40%; 40%–50%; 50%–60%; 60%–70%; 70%–80%; 80%–90%; 90%–100%; Other: 50%–60%

Republican primary results
Party	Candidate	Votes	%
Republican	James Park	52,886	64.12
Republican	Clarence Bartlett	21,959	26.62
Republican	Silas A. Sullivan	4,244	5.15
Republican	G. Tom Hawkins	3,397	4.12
Total votes		82,486	100.00

== General election ==
=== Candidates ===
- Alben W. Barkley, Senate Majority Leader and incumbent Senator since 1927 (Democratic)
- Robert H. Garrison (Prohibition)
- Yona M. Marret (Socialist Labor)
- James Park (Republican)

=== Results ===
1944 U.S. Senate election in Kentucky
Party	Candidate	Votes	%	±%
Democratic	Alben W. Barkley (incumbent)	464,053	54.81%	
Republican	James Park	380,425	44.93%	
Prohibition	Robert H. Garrison	1,808	0.21%	
Socialist Labor	Yona M. Marret	340	0.04%	
Write-in		115	0.00%	
Majority		83,628	9.88%	
Turnout		846,627		
Democratic hold				

== See also ==
- 1944 United States Senate elections

== Bibliography ==
- Congressional Elections, 1946-1996. Washington, D.C.: Congressional Quarterly Inc. 1998. ISBN 1-56802-248-4.
- Jewell, Malcolm E. (1963). Kentucky Votes. Vol. 1. University of Kentucky Press.
