= United Professional Basketball League =

The United Professional Basketball League (UPBL) was an American professional basketball league that played for one season in 2003. It included teams from the states of Kentucky and Ohio. After lasting one season, the league folded and its remaining teams joined the North American Basketball League (NABL).

The league started play as a four-team league in January 2003, reorganized from a planned Pro Basketball USA league set to have six teams. The four-teams were the Mansfield Hawks, Lexington (Kentucky Coyotes), Louisville Eagles, and Frankfort Statesmen. The Charleston Miners and teams in Dayton, Ohio and Crestview, Kentucky were set to play but the league folded before play started. The season ended by the end of March 2003.

== Former teams ==
- Mansfield (OH) Hawks
- Kentucky Coyotes
- Frankfort (KY) Statesmen
- Louisville (KY) Eagles
- Charleston Miners
