= Fred Applegate =

Fred Applegate may refer to:

- Fred Applegate (baseball) (1879–1968), American baseball player
- Fred Applegate (actor) (born 1953), American actor, singer and dancer
