= Mack Allison =

American baseball player (1887–1964)

- Pitcher
- Born: January 23, 1887; Owensboro, Kentucky, U.S.
- Died: March 13, 1964 (aged 77); Mount Vernon, Missouri, U.S.
- Batted: Right Threw: Right

MLB debut
- September 13, 1911, for the St. Louis Browns

Last MLB appearance
- August 20, 1913, for the St. Louis Browns

MLB statistics
- Win–loss record: 9–21
- Earned run average: 3.17
- Strikeouts: 57
- Stats at Baseball Reference

Teams
- St. Louis Browns (1911–1913)

Mack Pendleton Allison (January 23, 1887 – March 13, 1964) was an American professional baseball player whose career spanned 16 seasons, including three in Major League Baseball with the St. Louis Browns (1911–1913). Allison was a pitcher during his career. In his major league career, Allison compiled a record of 9–21 with a 3.17 earned run average (ERA), 17 complete games, one shutout, one save and 57 strikeouts in 45 games, 27 starts.

Alison also played in the minor leagues with the Class-D Columbus Discoverers (1908), the Class-D Shelbyville Grays (1909), the Class-A Buffalo Bisons (1909), the Class-D Richmond Pioneers (1910), the Class-B San Antonio Bronchos (1911), the Double-A Kansas City Blues (1913–1915), the Class-A New Orleans Pelicans (1915), the Class-A Little Rock Travelers (1916), the Class-A Mobile Sea Gulls (1916), the Class-A Sioux City Indians (1918–1919), the Class-A Des Moines Boosters (1919), the Class-A St. Joseph Saints (1920, 1925), the Class-B Bloomington Bloomers (1922), the Class-B Evansville Evas (1922), the Double-A Toledo Mud Hens (1922), the Class-A Waco Cubs (1925), the Class-A St. Joseph Saints (1925) and the Class-B Quincy Red Birds (1926).

== Professional career ==
=== Early career ===
In 1908, Allison began his professional baseball career with the Class-D Columbus Discoverers of the Cotton States League. That season, he compiled a record of 9–10 in 24 games. During the 1909 season, Allison played for two teams; the Class-D Shelbyville Grays and the Class-A Buffalo Bisons. With the Grays, Allison went 1–1. Alison compiled a record of 2–3 in 13 games with Buffalo that season. Allison joined the Class-D Richmond Pioneers of the Blue Grass League in 1910. With the Pioneers, Allison went 12–8 in 25 games. In 1911, Allison began the season with the Class-B San Antonio Bronchos of the Texas League. In 39 games with San Antonio, he went 18–14. Allison led all San Antonio pitchers in wins. He was also seventh amongst pitchers in the league in wins.

=== St. Louis Browns ===
Allison joined the St. Louis Browns Major League Baseball franchise in 1911. He made his major league debut on September 13, 1911. on the season, Allison went 2–1 with a 2.05 earned run average (ERA), three complete games and two strikeouts in three games, all starts. During the 1912 season, as a member of the Browns, Allison went 6–17 with a 3.62 ERA, 11 complete games, one shutout and 43 strikeouts in 31 games, 20 starts. Allison was tied for fifth in the American League in losses and was tied for eight in home runs allowed (4). Allison led all American League rookies in losses that season. In 1913, Allison went 1–3 with a 2.28 ERA, three complete games and 12 strikeouts in 11 games, four starts.

=== Kansas City Blues ===
On August 24, 1913, the St. Louis Browns traded Allison along with first baseman Bunny Brief, outfielder Pete Compton and US$10,000 to the Kansas City Blues in exchange for Tilly Walker. In his first season with the Blues, Allison went 4–5 in 10 games. Over the next season, 1914, Allison went 8–17 with a 4.50 ERA in 35 games. Allison spent his last season with the Blues in 1915, going 5–11 with a 3.69 ERA in 24 games.

=== Later career ===
In 1915, Allison joined the Class-A New Orleans Pelicans of the Southern Association. He went 5–7 in 16 games that season. During the next season, Allison played for both the Class-A Little Rock Travelers and the Class-A Mobile Sea Gulls, going 5–12 in 22 games on the season. After not playing professional baseball in 1917, Allison joined the Class-A Sioux City Indians in 1918. Allison went 9–5 in 17 games that season. In 1919, Allison played for two teams, the Class-A Sioux City Indians and the Class-A Des Moines Boosters, going 6–12 in 31 games between the two clubs.

Allison joined the St. Joseph Saints in 1920, going 14–12 in 35 games. He did not play in 1921, returning in 1922 with the Class-B Bloomington Bloomers and the Class-B Evansville Evas. That season, Allison went a combined 11–15 with a 3.39 ERA in 36 games. Allison played only six games in 1924, going 2–3 in that time with the Double-A Toledo Mud Hens. Allison did not play professionally in 1924. He returned for the 1925 season and played for the Class-A Waco Cubs and the Class-A St. Joseph Saints. With the Cubs, Allison went 1–2 with a 10.62 ERA in 10 games. Allison spent his final season as a player in 1926 with the Class-B Quincy Red Birds of the Illinois–Indiana–Iowa League. That year, Allison went 9–7 with a 3.56 ERA in 35 games. During the 1927, Allison began managing the Quincy Red Birds. He did not return as the manager in 1928.
