= Rip Van Winkle (coach) =

American sports coach (1900–1994)

Biographical details
- Born: May 6, 1900; Oakley, Kentucky, U.S.
- Died: January 6, 1994 (aged 93); Milwaukee, Wisconsin, U.S.

Playing career

Football
- c. 1920: Kentucky Wesleyan

Basketball
- c. 1920: Kentucky Wesleyan

Baseball
- c. 1920: Kentucky Wesleyan
- 1922: Winchester Dodgers
- 1924: Winchester Dodgers
- Position: Shortstop (baseball)

Coaching career (HC unless noted)

Football
- 1927: Kentucky Wesleyan (freshmen)
- 1928–1930: Kentucky Wesleyan
- 1932–1936: Highlands HS (KY)

Basketball
- 1928–1932: Kentucky Wesleyan
- 1937–1939: Cincinnati
- 1939–1942: Miami (OH)

Baseball
- c. 1930: Kentucky Wesleyan
- 1937–1938: Cincinnati

Administrative career (AD unless noted)
- ?–1932: Kentucky Wesleyan

Head coaching record
- Overall: 13–11–3 (college football)

Walter R. "Rip" Van Winkle (May 6, 1900 – January 6, 1994) was an American football, basketball, and baseball coach and college athletics administrator. He served as the head football coach at Kentucky Wesleyan College, when its campus was located in Winchester, Kentucky, from 1928 to 1930, compiling a record of 13–11–3. Van Winkle was also the head basketball coach, head baseball coach, and athletic director at Kentucky Wesleyan.

A native of London, Kentucky, Van Winkle played football, basketball, and baseball at Kentucky Wesleyan and Minor League Baseball with the Winchester Dodgers of the Blue Grass League. He left Kentucky Wesleyan in 1932 to become athletic director and head football coach at Highlands High School in Fort Thomas, Kentucky.

Van Winkle died on January 6, 1994, in Milwaukee.

== Head coaching record ==
=== College football ===
Year	Team	Overall	Conference	Standing	Bowl/playoffs
Kentucky Wesleyan Panthers (Southern Intercollegiate Athletic Association) (1928–1930)
1928	Kentucky Wesleyan	6–3	2–3	T–18th	
1929	Kentucky Wesleyan	5–4	1–3	T–22nd	
1930	Kentucky Wesleyan	2–4–3	2–1–1	10th	
Kentucky Wesleyan:		13–11–3	5–7–1		
Total:		13–11–3			
