= Cynthiana Cobblers =

- 1922–1924; Cynthiana, Kentucky

Minor league affiliations
- Class: Class D (1922–1924)
- League: Blue Grass League (1922–1924)

Major league affiliations
- Team: None

Minor league titles
- League titles (1): 1923
- Conference titles (1): 1922

Team data
- Name: Cynthiana Merchants (1922); Cynthiana Cobblers (1923–1924)
- Ballpark: River Road Park (1922–1924)

The Cynthiana Cobblers were a minor league baseball team based in Cynthiana, Kentucky. From 1922 to 1924, Cynthiana teams played exclusively as members of the Class D level Blue Grass League, winning the 1923 league championship.

Cynthiana first played as the "Merchants" in 1922 and the franchise hosted minor league home games at River Road Park in Cytheria.

== History ==
The 1922 Cynthiana Merchants were the first minor league baseball team based in Cynthiana, Kentucky. The Merchants began play as members of the six–team Class D level Blue Grass League. Some sources have the 1922 team moniker as the "Philanthropists."

The 1922 Blue Grass League reformed after a ten-year hiatus. The 1922 league members were the Cynthiana Merchants, Lexington Reds, Maysville Cardinals, Mount Sterling Essex, Paris Bourbons and Winchester Dodgers.

The "Merchants" moniker was used in reference to local merchants contributing funds to purchase uniforms and equipment for the new team. The Merchants who sponsored the team had their business name(s) displayed on the backs of the Cynthiana uniforms.

Beginning play in the 1922 Blue Grass League, the league played a split season schedule. The Merchants won the second–half standings and advanced to the playoff final. In the overall standings, Cynthiana placed third with their record of 34–30 under manager Ernest McIlvan. The Merchants finished 2.0 games behind the first place Paris Bourbons in the overall standings. Paris did not advance to the playoff as the Maysville Cardinals, with a 16–6 record, won the first half standings and Cynthiana, with a 25–17 record, won the second half standings. The two teams met in a playoff series to decide the championship. The overall standings consisted of the Paris Bourbons (36–28), Maysville Cardinals (33–28), Cynthiana Merchants (34–30), Mount Sterling Essex (30–31), Lexington Reds (28–36) and Winchester Dodgers (28–36).

In the 1922 league finals, Cytheria lost as the Maysville Cardinals defeated Cynthiana 3 games to 1 to win the league championship.

Continuing play in the 1923 Blue Grass League season, the team became known the "Cynthiana Cobblers" and won the league championship. With a 54–43 record, the Cobblers finished in first place under manager Bill Schumaker and were league champions, as the league did not continue with a split season schedule. Cynthiana finished 1.0 game ahead of the second place Winchester Dodgers in the final standings of the six–team, Class D level league. No playoffs were held in the 1923 season.

The Cynthiana area had over 30 whiskey distilleries in the era of the minor league team, corresponding to the nickname. A "Cobbler" was a popular whiskey cocktail at the time.

In their final season of play, the 1924 Cynthiana Cobblers finished a close second in the Blue Grass League final standings. With a record of 50–42 under managers Bill Schumaker and John Koval in the four–team Blue Grass League, Cynthiana finished just a 0.5 game behind the first place Paris Boosters. No playoffs were held as teand the Blue Grass League did not have a split-season schedule in the 1924 season.

The Class D level Blue Grass League did not reform in 1925 and permanently folded after the 1924 season. None of the six teams in the league continued play. Cynthiana, Kentucky has not hosted another minor league team.

== The ballpark ==
The Cynthiana teams hosted minor league home games at River Road Park. Today, River Road Park is still in use as a public park with the ballfield. River Road Park is located at 217 Kentucky Highway 316 in Cynthiana, Kentucky.

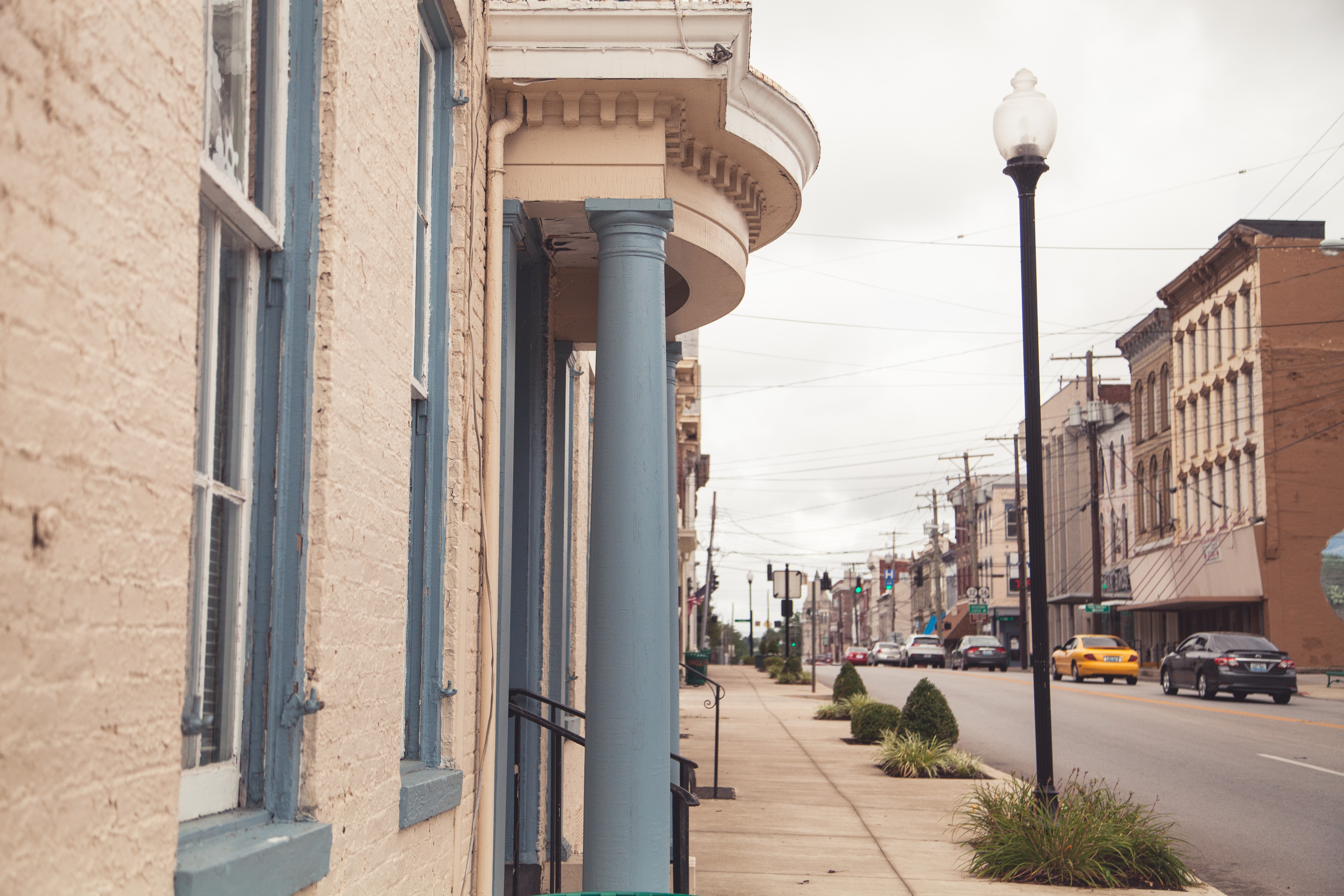
(2014) Downtown Main Street. Cynthiana, Kentucky

== Timeline ==
Year(s)	# Yrs.	Team	Level	League	Ballpark
1922	1	Cynthiana Merchants	Class D	Blue Grass League	River Road Park
1923–1924	2	Cynthiana Cobblers	Class D	Blue Grass League	River Road Park

== Year–by–year records ==
Year	Record	Finish	Manager	Playoffs
1922	34–30	3rd	Ernest McIlvan	Lost in Finals
1923	54–43	1st	Bill Schumaker	League champions
1924	50–42	2nd	Bil Schumaker / John Koval	No playoffs held

== Notable alumni ==
- Jim Mullen (1923)
- Stan Rees (1922)

== See also ==
- Cynthiana Cobblers players
- Cynthiana Merchants players
