= George Kircher =

American baseball player & coach (1887–1949)

Biographical details
- Born: October 3, 1887; Louisville, Kentucky, U.S.
- Died: April 1, 1949 (aged 61); Birmingham, Alabama, U.S.

Coaching career (HC unless noted)
- 1924–1932: Virginia Tech

George S. Kircher (October 3, 1887 – April 1, 1949) was an American longtime baseball figure.

He was born in Louisville, Kentucky. He played in the minor leagues from 1908 to 1918 and in 1921, spending time with the Shelbyville Grays, Maysville Rivermen, Winchester Hustlers, Norfolk Tars, Atlanta Crackers, Nashville Volunteers, Portland Beavers (of the well-regarded Pacific Coast League), Rocky Mount Tar Heels, Richmond Climbers, Fort Worth Panthers and Meridian Mets. In 1913, he managed the Tars for part of the campaign, replacing Charles Shaffer and being replaced by Ray Ryan.

He was later the head baseball coach at Virginia Polytechnic Institute & State University, skippering the team from 1924 to 1932 and leading it to a combined record of 77–54–7.

He died in Birmingham, Alabama.

== Head coaching record ==
Record table
Season	Team	Overall	Conference	Standing	Postseason
Virginia Tech (Independent) (1924–1932)
1924	Virginia Tech	10–6–1			
1925	Virginia Tech	5–11–2			
1926	Virginia Tech	13–6–1			
1927	Virginia Tech	11–4			
1928	Virginia Tech	4–7			
1929	Virginia Tech	9–6			
1930	Virginia Tech	13–2–1			
1931	Virginia Tech	7–7–2			
1932	Virginia Tech	5–7			
Total:		77–54–7			
National champion Postseason invitational champion Conference regular season champion Conference regular season and conference tournament champion Division regular season champion Division regular season and conference tournament champion Conference tournament champion
