= Jim Jones (1900s outfielder) =

American baseball player (1876–1953)

- Outfielder
- Born: December 25, 1876; London, Kentucky, U.S.
- Died: May 6, 1953 (aged 76); London, Kentucky, U.S.
- Batted: Right Threw: Right

MLB debut
- June 29, 1897, for the Louisville Colonels

Last MLB appearance
- August 5, 1902, for the New York Giants

MLB statistics
- Batting average: .230
- Home runs: 0
- Runs batted in: 24
- Stats at Baseball Reference

Teams
- Louisville Colonels (1897); New York Giants (1901–1902)

James Tilford Jones (December 25, 1876 – May 6, 1953) was an American Major League Baseball outfielder. He played all or part of three seasons in the majors: 1897 for the Louisville Colonels, and 1901 and 1902 for the New York Giants.

Jones began his career as a pitcher. However, in his first game in the majors, he gave up 22 runs in 6.2 innings of relief against the Chicago Colts. The Colts scored a total of 36 runs in the game, which is still the major league record. He converted to the outfield full-time while in the minor leagues with the Cleveland Lake Shores in 1900.

After his major league career ended, he continued to play in the minor leagues until 1914. He also managed the Grand Rapids Champs in 1914 and the Maysville Burley Cubs in 1916.

== Sources ==
- Career statistics from Baseball Reference · Baseball Reference (Minors) · Retrosheet · Baseball Almanac
