= Emil Huhn =

American baseball player (1892–1925)

- First baseman / Catcher
- Born: March 10, 1892; North Vernon, Indiana, U.S.
- Died: September 5, 1925 (aged 33); Camden, South Carolina, U.S.
- Batted: Right Threw: Right

MLB debut
- April 10, 1915, for the Newark Peppers

Last MLB appearance
- June 24, 1917, for the Cincinnati Reds

MLB statistics
- Batting average: .229
- Home runs: 1
- RBI: 47
- Stats at Baseball Reference

Teams
- Newark Peppers (1915); Cincinnati Reds (1916–1917)

Emil Hugo "Hap" Huhn (March 10, 1892 – September 5, 1925) was an American right-handed Major League Baseball first baseman and catcher who played for the Federal League's Newark Peppers in 1915 and for the Cincinnati Reds in 1916 and 1917. He died at the age of 33 in a car crash.

Huhn began his minor league career in 1910, playing for the Richmond Pioneers and Shelbyville Grays, hitting .200 in 16 games. He played for the Hopkinsville Hoppers in 1911, hitting an improved .296 in 107 games. In 1912, he played for the Adrian Lions, hitting .252, and in 1913 he played for the Adrian Champs, hitting .305. He played for the Seattle Giants in 1914, hitting .295 with 31 doubles and ten triples.

He made his big league debut on April 10, 1915, playing for the Peppers. In 124 games for them that year, he hit 227 with 18 doubles and 13 stolen bases. He was purchased by the Reds from the Peppers on February 10, 1916, and in 1916 he hit .255 in 37 games. He hit .196 in 23 games for the Reds in 1917. On June 24, 1917, he played his final big league game.

Overall, Huhn hit 229 with 40 runs and 47 RBI in 184 big league games. In 560 at-bats, he collected 128 hits - 22 of which were doubles, five of which were triples and one of which was a home run - and he stole 14 bases as well.

Although his major league career was done after 1917, he continued to play professionally, in the minor leagues, until 1925. From 1918 to 1920, he played for the Milwaukee Brewers, hitting .269, .282 and .295 in his three years with them. He played for the Augusta Georgians in 1921, hitting .359 with 43 doubles and 17 triples.

From 1922 to 1924, he played for the Mobile Bears, hitting .311, .345 and .292 in three years with them. He split 1925 between the Augusta Tygers and Dallas Steers, hitting a combined .329 that season. Overall, he hit 304 with 1,658 hits in 1,544 minor league games.

== Minor league managing ==
He managed the Augusta Georgians in 1921 and the Mobile Bears in 1924. He managed the Augusta Tygers for part of the 1925 season.

== Death ==
On September 5, 1925, after a minor league game, Huhn drove six of his players back to Augusta in a large touring car. A second touring car followed a few minutes behind with team president J. Marvin Wolfe and the remaining players. When Huhn's vehicle was about 14 miles from Camden, South Carolina, it entered a “blind” curve in the road and went out of control, overturning and landing in a deep ditch. The vehicle was reportedly traveling 30 mph at the time. It was approximately 9:30 p.m. Emil was killed instantly. He was 33. His front-seat passenger, 30-year-old catcher Frank Reiger, died in an ambulance on the way to the hospital. Others in the vehicle and their injuries—none life-threatening— were pitcher Harry Smythe (broken collarbone), pitcher Kenneth “Duke” Sedgwick (bruises to the head), shortstop Joe Buskey (back injury), catcher Tobe Livingston (bruises to the head), and pitcher Chris Haury (shoulder and back injuries).
