= Ray Miner =

American baseball player (1897–1963)

- Born: April 4, 1897; Glen Falls, New York
- Died: September 15, 1963 (aged 66); Glen Ridge, New York
- Batted: Right Threw: Left

MLB debut
- September 15, 1921, for the Philadelphia Athletics

Last MLB appearance
- September 15, 1921, for the Philadelphia Athletics

MLB statistics
- Win–loss record: 0–0
- Earned run average: 36.00
- Strikeouts: 0
- Stats at Baseball Reference

Teams
- Philadelphia Athletics (1921)

Raymond Theodore Miner (April 4, 1897 – September 15, 1963) was an American Major League Baseball pitcher. He played for the Philadelphia Athletics during the 1921 season.

In 1922, Miner was pitching in the Blue Grass League when a foul ball was caught by a spectator who threw it accurately back to him from her seat. Miner was introduced to the fan, Marie Felice Welsh, and they married in February 1923.

In 1924, Miner was acquitted of murder after a trial in Kentucky. Miner was charged as an accomplice because he had been with a man the day he shot and killed another man on the street.
