= Red Munson =

American baseball player (1883-1957)

- Catcher
- Born: July 31, 1883; Cincinnati, Ohio, U.S.
- Died: February 19, 1957 (aged 73); Mishawaka, Indiana, U.S.
- Batted: Unknown Threw: Right

MLB debut
- August 28, 1905, for the Philadelphia Phillies

Last MLB appearance
- October 7, 1905, for the Philadelphia Phillies

MLB statistics
- Batting average: .115
- Home runs: 0
- Runs batted in: 2
- Stats at Baseball Reference

Teams
- Philadelphia Phillies (1905)

Clarence Hanford "Red" Munson (July 31, 1883 – February 19, 1957) was an American catcher in Major League Baseball. He played for the Philadelphia Phillies in 1905.

In February prior to the 1905 season, Munson was ice skating on the Ohio River to keep in shape when he saved the life of an elderly man who had fallen through the ice.
