= Fred Applegate (baseball) =

American baseball player (1879–1968)

- Pitcher
- Born: May 9, 1879; Williamsport, Pennsylvania, U.S.
- Died: April 21, 1968 (aged 88); Williamsport, Pennsylvania, U.S.
- Batted: Left Threw: Left

MLB debut
- September 30, 1904, for the Philadelphia Athletics

Last MLB appearance
- October 10, 1904, for the Philadelphia Athletics

MLB statistics
- Win–loss record: 1–2
- Earned run average: 6.43
- Strikeouts: 12
- Stats at Baseball Reference

Teams
- Philadelphia Athletics (1904)

Frederick Romaine Applegate (May 9, 1879 – April 21, 1968) was an American Major League Baseball pitcher in 1904 for the Philadelphia Athletics. Between September 30 and October 10, he started and completed three games, winning 1 and losing 2 with an ERA of 6.43. His lone major league win came against the Washington Senators in his third and final start. The score was 7–6.

A good hitter and fielder during his brief time in the big leagues, he batted .286 (2-for-7) and handled eight chances without making an error.

A native of Williamsport, Pennsylvania, he died in his hometown at the age of 88.
