= Eddie Bacon =

American baseball player (1895–1963)

- Pitcher
- Born: April 8, 1895; Frankfort, Kentucky, U.S.
- Died: October 2, 1963 (aged 68); Louisville, Kentucky, U.S.
- Batted: Unknown Threw: Unknown

MLB debut
- August 13, 1917, for the Philadelphia Athletics

Last MLB appearance
- August 20, 1917, for the Philadelphia Athletics

MLB statistics
- Win–loss record: 0–0
- Earned run average: 6.00
- Strikeouts: 0
- Stats at Baseball Reference

Teams
- Philadelphia Athletics (1917)

Edgar Suter Bacon (April 8, 1895 – October 2, 1963) was an American professional baseball pitcher who played for the Philadelphia Athletics of Major League Baseball during the 1917 season. He was sold from the Chattanooga Lookouts to Philadelphia in late July. Bacon pitched in one game for the Athletics, and appeared in three others as a pinch hitter. He was sent back to the Lookouts on August 23.
