= Hod Eller =

American baseball player (1894–1961)

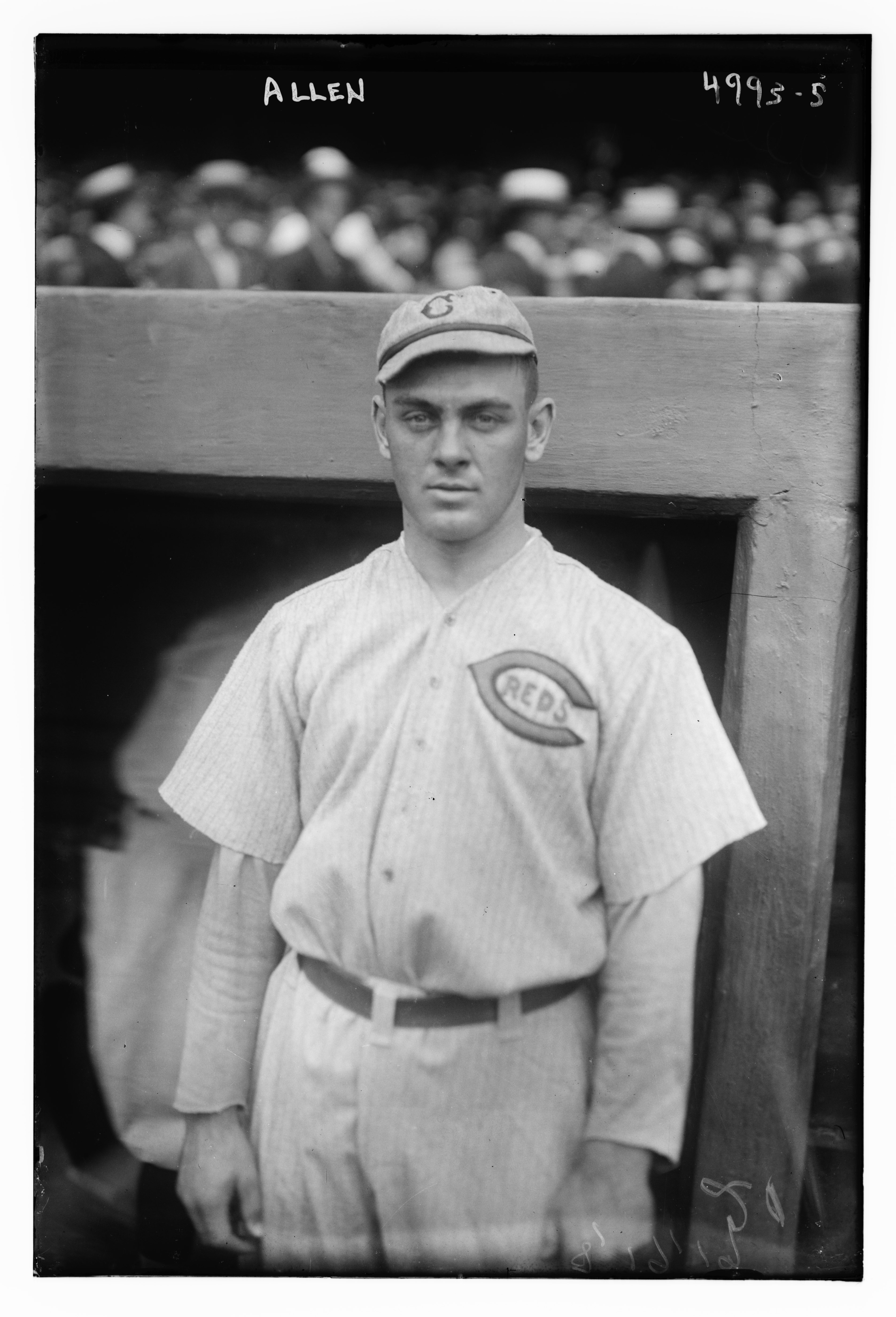
- Pitcher
- Born: July 5, 1894; Muncie, Indiana, U.S.
- Died: July 18, 1961 (aged 67); Indianapolis, Indiana, U.S.
- Batted: Right Threw: Right

MLB debut
- April 16, 1917, for the Cincinnati Reds

Last MLB appearance
- September 15, 1921, for the Cincinnati Reds

MLB statistics
- Win–loss record: 60–40
- Earned run average: 2.62
- Strikeouts: 381
- Stats at Baseball Reference

Teams
- Cincinnati Reds (1917–1921)

Career highlights and awards
- World Series champion (1919); Pitched a no-hitter on May 11, 1919

Horace Owen "Hod" Eller (July 5, 1894 – July 18, 1961) was an American pitcher in Major League Baseball. He played for the Cincinnati Reds from 1917 to 1921 and was a member of the 1919 World Series champions.

== Biography ==
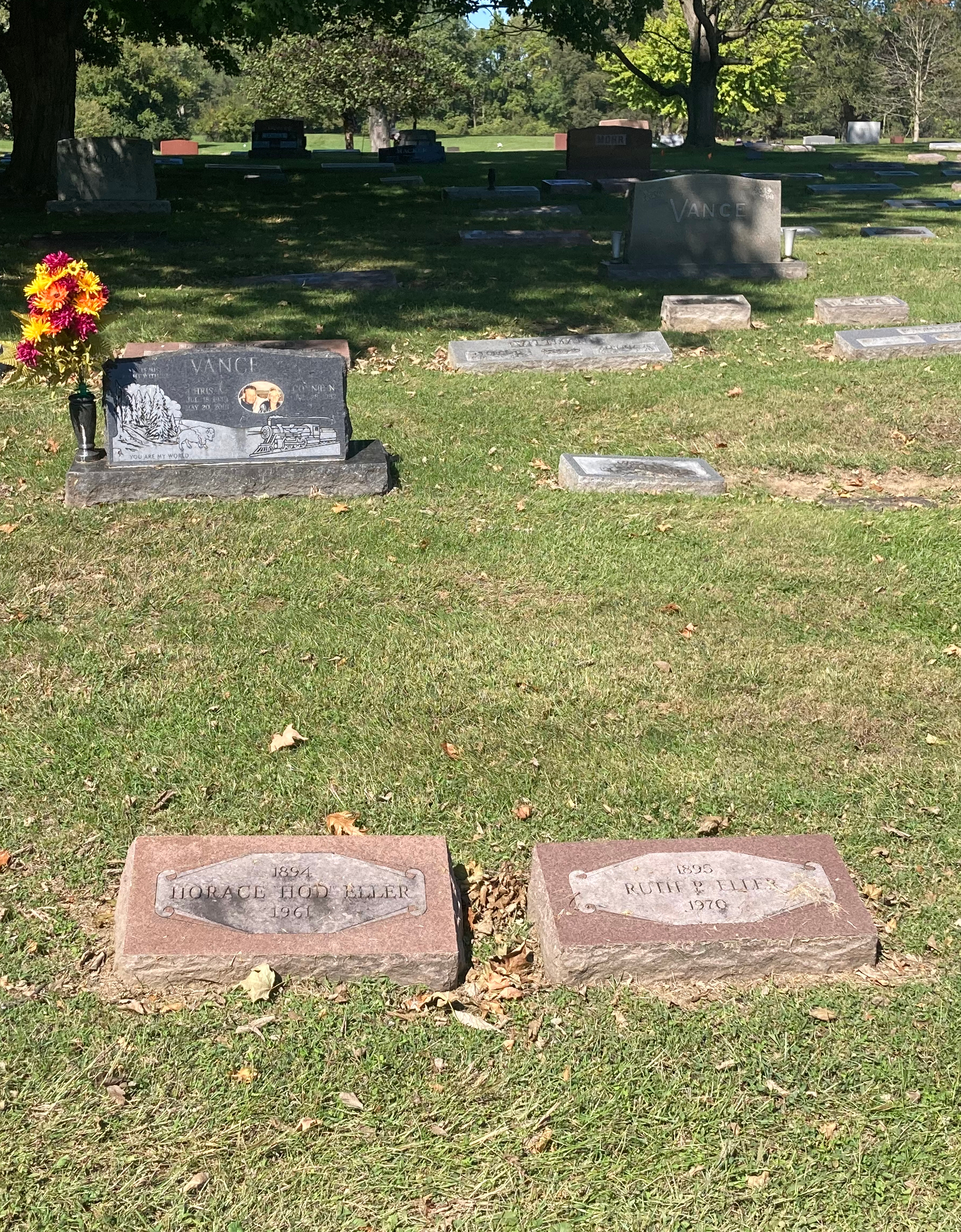
Eller's grave at Crown Hill Cemetery

Hod Eller was born in Muncie, Indiana. He started his minor league career in 1913. In 1915, he won 19 games for the Moline Plowboys of the Illinois–Indiana–Iowa League. His performance gained the attention of the Cincinnati Reds, and he was drafted by the team after the 1916 season. He pitched five years for the Reds, going 60–40 with a 2.62 earned run average (108 Adjusted ERA+).

Eller peaked in the Reds' pennant-winning 1919 season. He led the team in innings, and went 19–9 with a 2.39 ERA. On May 11 of that season, Eller no-hit the St. Louis Cardinals 6–0 at Redland Field. He then pitched two complete game victories in the World Series, but it was later revealed that members of the Chicago White Sox had intentionally thrown the series for money. In Game Five of that Series, Eller shut out the White Sox 5–0 with nine strikeouts, including six consecutively—a record that would be tied by Moe Drabowsky in the 1966 World Series opener.

After his major league career ended, Eller played in the minors for a few years, last playing for the Indianapolis Indians in 1924.

The Baseball Record Book records that on August 21, 1917, Eller struck out three batters on nine pitches in the ninth inning of a 7–5 win over the New York Giants; however, the New York Times from the day after the game noted that Eller allowed a single to start that inning, and so did not officially achieve an immaculate inning.

He died from cancer in Indianapolis on July 18, 1961, and was buried at Crown Hill Cemetery in Section 223, Lot 1017.

== In popular culture ==
In the 1987 movie Matewan, set in 1920 West Virginia, Hod Eller is mentioned as the child preacher Danny Radnor's favorite pitcher, although Radnor incorrectly says it is because Eller is from Logan County. Screenwriter and Director John Sayles would later write and direct the movie Eight Men Out featuring the circumstances around the fixing of the 1919 World Series and Eller's Reds' team victory.

== See also ==
- List of Major League Baseball no-hitters

Preceded by Dutch Leonard	No-hitter pitcher May 11, 1919	Succeeded by Ray Caldwell
