= George Yantz =

American baseball player (1886–1967)

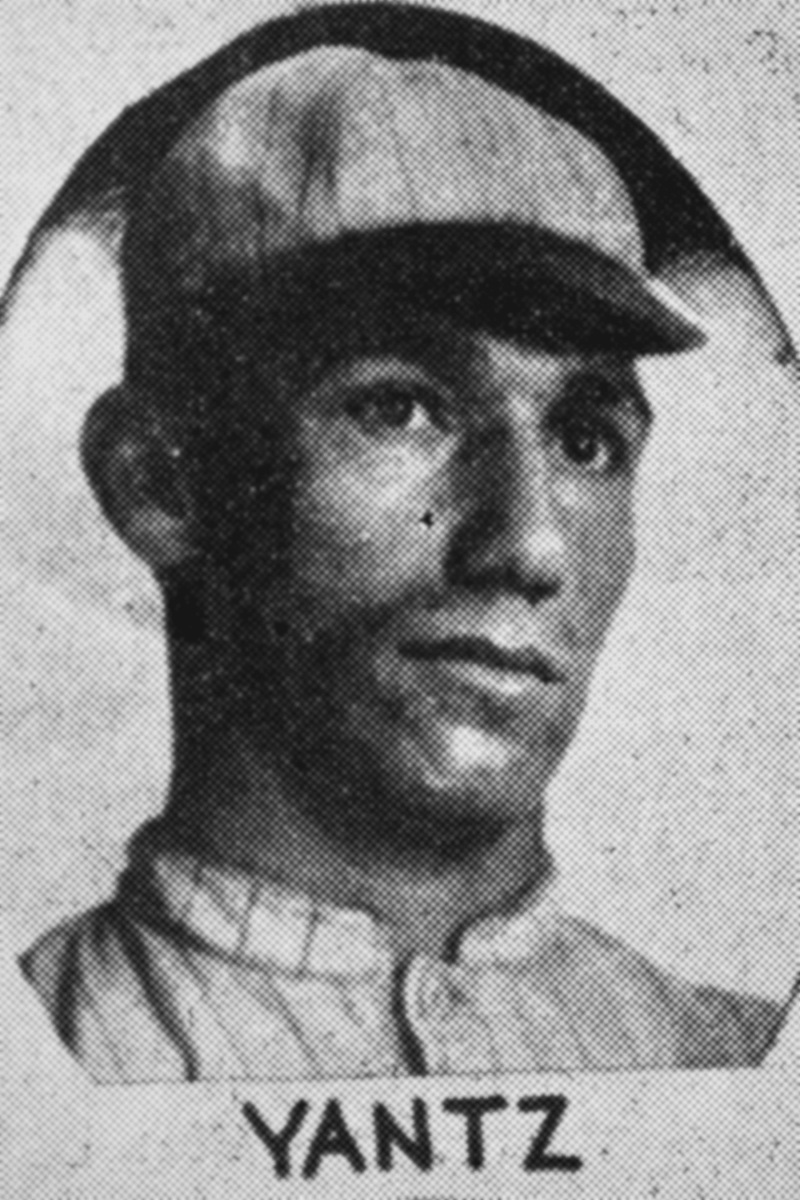
- Catcher
- Born: July 27, 1886; Louisville, Kentucky, U.S.
- Died: February 26, 1967 (aged 80); Louisville, Kentucky, U.S.
- Batted: Right Threw: Right

MLB debut
- September 30, 1912, for the Chicago Cubs

Last MLB appearance
- September 30, 1912, for the Chicago Cubs

MLB statistics
- At bats: 1
- Hits: 1
- Batting average: 1.000
- Stats at Baseball Reference

Teams
- Chicago Cubs (1912)

George Webb Yantz (July 27, 1886 – February 26, 1967) was an American professional baseball player. Yantz played in one game as a catcher in Major League Baseball, going 1 for 1 for the Chicago Cubs in 1912 season. Overall, he played ten seasons professionally, from 1907 until 1916. Yantz was born and died in Louisville, Kentucky.
