= Jim Park (baseball) =

American baseball player (1892–1970)

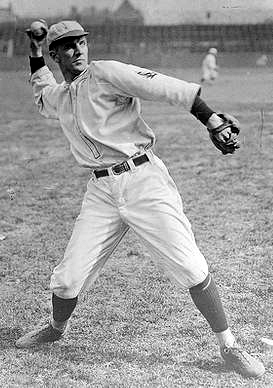
- Pitcher
- Born: November 10, 1892; Richmond, Kentucky, U.S.
- Died: December 17, 1970 (aged 78); Lexington, Kentucky, U.S.
- Batted: Right Threw: Right

MLB debut
- September 7, 1915, for the St. Louis Browns

Last MLB appearance
- July 11, 1917, for the St. Louis Browns

MLB statistics
- Win–loss record: 4–5
- Earned run average: 3.02
- Strikeouts: 40
- Stats at Baseball Reference

Teams
- St. Louis Browns (1915–1917)

James Park (November 10, 1892 – December 17, 1970) was an American Major League Baseball pitcher who played for the St. Louis Browns from 1915 to 1917. He also played football, basketball, and baseball at the University of Kentucky from 1911 to 1915, and coached basketball there in 1915–16 and baseball in 1922. Park also served as the head football coach at Transylvania University from 1919 to 1921, and he was also a student–coach at Eastern Kentucky University in 1909.

After his playing and coaching days, Park enjoyed a long and successful career as a lawyer, a career that was interspersed with terms of public office and with service in various capacities in the Republican party. In 1944 he was the Republican candidate for the United States Senate against the incumbent Alben W. Barkley, and, although defeated, he reduced the Democratic majority in Kentucky from approximately 145,000 (in 1940) to about 80,000 in 1944.

== Head coaching record ==
=== Football ===
Year	Team	Overall	Conference	Standing	Bowl/playoffs
Eastern Kentucky Colonels (Independent) (1909)
1909	Eastern Kentucky	0–0–4			
Eastern Kentucky:		0–0–4			
Transylvania Crimsons/Pioneers (Southern Intercollegiate Athletic Association) (1919–1921)
1919	Transylvania	2–4	1–1	T–13th	
1920	Transylvania	3–4	2–2	T–12th	
1921	Transylvania	4–4	2–1	T–8th	
Transylvania:		9–12	5–4		
Total:		9–12–4			

== Political career ==
=== Electoral history ===
1944 U.S. Senate election in Kentucky
Party	Candidate	Votes	%
Democratic	Alben W. Barkley (incumbent)	464,053	54.81
Republican	Jim Park	380,425	44.93
Prohibition	Robert H. Garrison	1,808	0.21
Socialist Labor	Yona M. Marret	340	0.04
Total votes		846,626	100.00
Democratic hold			
