= Bill Cramer =

American baseball player (1891–1966)

- Pitcher
- Born: May 22, 1891; Bedford, Indiana, U.S.
- Died: September 11, 1966 (aged 75); Fort Wayne, Indiana, U.S.
- Batted: Right Threw: Right

MLB debut
- June 25, 1912, for the Cincinnati Reds

Last MLB appearance
- June 25, 1912, for the Cincinnati Reds

MLB statistics
- Games played: 1
- Earned run average: 0.00
- Strikeouts: 2
- Stats at Baseball Reference

Teams
- Cincinnati Reds (1912)

William Wendell Cramer (May 22, 1891 – September 11, 1966) was an American pitcher in Major League Baseball. He played for the Cincinnati Reds in 1912.
