= Blue Grass League =

- Classification: Class D (1908–1912, 1922–1924)
- Sport: Minor League Baseball
- First season: 1908
- Folded: 1924
- President: George L. Hammond (1908—1909); Dr. W.C. Ussery (1910—1911); William Neal (1911—1912); Thomas M. Russell (1922—1924)
- No. of teams: 12
- Country: United States of America
- Most titles: 4 Paris Bourbons/Bourbonites (1910–1911, 1922, 1924)

The Blue Grass League was a minor league baseball circuit at the Class D level that existed in the early 1900s. There were two incarnations of the league, one that ran from 1908 to 1912 and one that existed from 1922 to 1924. It consisted entirely of teams based in Kentucky.

== 1908–1912 ==
Six teams played in the league's inaugural season: the Frankfort Statesmen, Lexington Colts, Richmond Pioneers, Shelbyville Grays, Winchester Hustlers and Lawrenceburg Distillers. The Statesmen finished in first place.

In 1909, the Hustlers, Pioneers, Statesmen and Colts returned to the league, while Shelbyville dropped its nickname and the Lawrenceburg team departed. In its stead were the Paris Bourbonites. The Hustlers finished in first place.

All teams from 1909 returned for 1910, though partway through the year the Shelbyville squad moved to Maysville to become the Maysville Rivermen. The Bourbonites finished first in the league. Baseball Hall of Fame member Casey Stengel played for Shelbyville/Maysville in 1910.

All teams from 1910 returned for 1911, with the Bourbonites finishing in first place again. There was also a playoff held that season, with the Bourbonites winning the series.

In 1912, the Statesmen became the Frankfort Lawmakers. Winchester moved to Nicholas and then Mt. Sterling to finish the season as the Mt. Sterling Orphans. Outside of those changes, the league remained the same. Frankfort finished in first place.

== 1922–1924 ==
The inaugural season of the second incarnation of the league featured the Paris Mammoths, Maysville Cardinals, Cynthiana Merchants, Mt. Sterling Essex, Winchester Dodgers and Lexington Reos. The Mammoths finished in first, though the league playoff pitted Maysville against Cynthiana, with the former winning the series.

1923 saw multiple teams change names. The Merchants became the Cynthiana Cobblers and the Mammoths became the Paris Bourbons. The other teams remained the same. Cynthiana finished in first place.

The league consisted of only four teams in 1924 — Paris, Cynthiana, Lexington (now called the Lexington Studebakers) and Winchester. The Bourbons finished in first place.

== Cities represented ==
- Cynthiana, Kentucky: Cynthiana Merchants (1922); Cynthiana Cobblers (1923–1924)
- Frankfort, Kentucky: Frankfort Lawmakers (1908–1912)
- Lawrenceburg, Kentucky: Lawrenceburg Distillers (1908)
- Lexington, Kentucky: Lexington Thoroughbreds (1908); Lexington Colts (1909–1912); Lexington Reds (1922–1923); Lexington Studebakers (1924)
- Maysville, Kentucky: Maysville Rivermen (1910–1912); Maysville Cardinals (1922–1923)
- Mount Sterling, Kentucky: Mount Sterling Orphans (1912); Mount Sterling Essex (1922–1923)
- Nicholasville, Kentucky: Nicholasville (1912)
- Paris, Kentucky: Paris Bourbonites (1909–1912); Paris Bourbons (1922–1924)
- Richmond, Kentucky: Richmond Pioneers (1908–1912)
- Shelbyville, Kentucky: Shelbyville Millers (1908–1910)
- Versailles, Kentucky: Versailles Aristocrats (1908)
- Winchester, Kentucky: Winchester Reds (1908); Winchester Hustlers (1909–1912); Winchester Dodgers (1922–1924)

== Yearly standings ==
=== 1908 to 1912 ===
1908 Blue Grass League

Team standings	W	L	PCT	GB	Managers
Frankfort Lawmakers	47	23	.671	—	N. G. Kennedy
Lexington Thoroughbreds	37	31	.544	9.0	Thomas Sheets
Richmond Pioneers	36	34	.514	11.0	William Parrish
Lawrenceburg Distillers	33	35	.485	13.0	Guy Woodruff
Shelbyville Millers	32	37	.464	14½	Anton Kuhn
Versailles Aristocrats / Winchester Hustlers	22	47	.319	24.5	NA

No Playoffs scheduled.

1909 Blue Grass League

Team standings	W	L	PCT	GB	Managers
Winchester Hustlers	75	44	.630	—	Daddy Horn
Richmond Pioneers	75	45	.625	½	Al Grohe
Paris Bourbonites	61	57	.516	13½	Jeff Elgin / Henry Schmidt / James Barnett
Frankfort Lawmakers	56	60	.482	17½	N. G. Kennedy / Ben Marshall
Lexington Colts	48	69	.410	26.0	Thomas Sheets / Cy Stout / Pat Downing
Shelbyville Millers	39	79	.321	35½	Anton Kuhn

No Playoffs scheduled.

1910 Blue Grass League schedule

Team standings	W	L	PCT	GB	Managers
Paris Bourbonites	80	47	.630	—	Edward McKernan
Lexington Colts	69	56	.552	10.0	Hogan Yancy
Winchester Hustlers	63	59	.516	14½	Newton Horn / Ed Coleman
Richmond Pioneers	63	60	.512	15.0	William Maloney
Frankfort Lawmakers	60	61	.496	17.0	Wallace Warren / Danny Harrell
Shelbyville Millers / Maysville Rivermen	37	89	.294	42½	Anton Kuhn / Daniel Collins

No Playoffs scheduled.

1911 Blue Grass League schedule

Team standings	W	L	PCT	GB	Managers
Paris Bourbonites	71	44	.617	—	Edward McKernan
Lexington Colts	65	50	.565	6.0	Thomas Sheets / Hogan Yancy
Winchester Hustlers	59	59	.500	13½	Ed Coleman
Maysville Rivermen	55	63	.466	17½	James Carmony
Frankfort Lawmakers	48	65	.425	22.0	NA
Richmond Pioneers	47	64	.423	22.0	Connie Lewis / Sylvester Olson

Playoff: Paris 4 games, Winchester 0.

1912 Blue Grass League

Team standings	W	L	PCT	GB	Managers
Frankfort Lawmakers	85	42	.670	—	Ollie Gfroerer
Maysville Rivermen	82	47	.634	4.0	James Carmony / Harry Kunkel
Richmond Pioneers	66	64	.508	20½	William Fisher
Lexington Colts	60	65	.480	24.0	Hogan Yancy / Ted McGrew
Paris Bourbonites	60	69	.465	26.0	Joe Lewis / Danning Harrell
Winchester Hustlers / Nicholasville / Mount Sterling Orphans	31	97	.242	54½	Harry Kunkel / McBrayer / Bob Spade

No Playoffs scheduled.

=== 1922 to 1924 ===
1922 Blue Grass League schedule

Team standings	W	L	PCT	GB	Managers
Paris Bourbons	36	28	.563	—	B. Goodman / Harold Willis
Maysville Cardinals	33	28	.541	1½	Norbert Bosken
Cynthiana Merchants	34	30	.531	2.0	Ernest McIlvan
Mt. Sterling Essex	30	31	.492	4½	Hod Eller
Winchester Dodgers	28	36	.438	8.0	Howie Camnitz / Walter Van Winkle
Lexington Reds	28	36	.438	8.0	Pat Devereaux / Jim Park

Playoff: Maysville 3 games, Cynthiana 1.

1923 Blue Grass League

Team standings	W	L	PCT	GB	Managers
Cynthiana Cobblers	54	43	.557	—	Bill Schumaker
Winchester Dodgers	53	44	.546	1.0	Pat Devereaux
Maysville Cardinals	48	45	.516	4.0	Norbert Bosken
Paris Bourbons	45	47	.480	6½	Nickholas Winger / Felix Cicona
Lexington Reds	44	49	.473	8.0	Doug Harbison
Mt. Sterling Essex	38	54	.413	13.5	Charles Ellis / Hod Eller

No Playoffs were held.

1924 Blue Grass League schedule

Team standings	W	L	PCT	GB	Managers
Paris Bourbons	51	43	.543	—	Bob Corkhill / Pat Devereaux / Fritz Mueller
Cynthiana Cobblers	50	43	.538	½	Bill Schumaker / John Koval
Lexington Studebakers	43	50	.462	7½	Jesse Young / Jim Viox
Winchester Dodgers	43	51	.457	8.0	George Bell

No Playoffs were scheduled.
