= Richmond Pioneers =

Minor league baseball team based in Richmond, Kentucky

The Richmond Pioneers were a minor league baseball team that played in the Class-D Blue Grass League from 1908 to 1912. They were based in Richmond, Kentucky, USA.

Multiple Major League Baseball players played for the Pioneers. They include Roy Golden, Ed Glenn, Marty Krug, Emil Huhn, Mack Allison, Raymond Haley, Jim Park, and Jim Jones.
