= Ed Glenn (shortstop) =

American baseball player (1875–1911)

- Shortstop
- Born: October 1875; Cincinnati, Ohio, U.S.
- Died: December 6, 1911 (aged 36); Ludlow, Kentucky, U.S.
- Batted: Right Threw: Right

MLB debut
- September 7, 1898, for the Washington Senators

Last MLB appearance
- June 27, 1902, for the Chicago Orphans

MLB statistics
- Batting average: .067
- Home runs: 0
- Runs batted in: 0
- Stats at Baseball Reference

Teams
- Washington Senators (1898); New York Giants (1898); Chicago Orphans (1902)

Edward D. Glenn (October 1875 – December 6, 1911) was an American shortstop in Major League Baseball. He played parts of two seasons in the majors, 1898 for the Washington Senators and New York Giants, and 1902 for the Chicago Orphans.

Glenn died in Ludlow, Kentucky when he accidentally fell into a railroad pit.
