= Lexington Colts =

The Lexington Colts were a baseball team competing in the Blue Grass League, 1908–1912, the Ohio State League, 1913–1916, and the Mountain States League, 1954. The 1908 Lexington team was also called the "Thoroughbreds," Neither the team nor the league lasted through the 1954 season, but the manager was former major leaguer Zeke Bonura and a star was future major leaguer Lou Johnson.
