= Eva Thomas =

Canadian filmmaker and screenwriter

Eva Thomas is a Canadian First Nations (Walpole Island First Nation) filmmaker and screenwriter.

== Early life and education ==
Thomas attended Arizona State University, where she studied Communication and Broadcasting. She went on to study at the American Academy of Dramatic Arts in New York City, the Webber Douglas Academy of Dramatic Art in London, and Capilano University.

== Career ==
Thomas was initially interested in acting in Hollywood, but after realizing the limited number of roles available for Indigenous actors, she decided to become a script writer and editor instead. She went on to run the imagineNATIVE Features Lab, doing script editing. While there, she worked with Kaniehtiio Horn as a story editor and later executive producer on a project called Seeds.

After completing the Harold Greenberg Fund's Indigenous Story Editing Mentorship, Thomas decided she would aim to create her own short film as a way to break into the feature film industry.

Thomas worked as an associate producer on the 2021 film Night Raiders.

In 2021, Thomas was chosen as one of five Indigenous women to participate in Women in View's Five in Focus: Indigenous program.

In 2023, Thomas debuted her short film Redlights at the 2023 Toronto International Film Festival. The film stars Kaniehtiio Horn and Ellyn Jade, and its story was inspired by the Starlight Tours in Saskatoon and the 1991 film Thelma & Louise.

In September 2023, it was announced that Thomas would be co-directing and co-writing her first feature film, Aberdeen, alongside Ryan Cooper. The film, about an indigenous women who relocates to Winnipeg, stars Gail Maurice, Billy Merasty, Jennifer Podemski, Liam Stewart-Kanigan and Ryan Rajendra Black. It premiered at the 2024 Toronto International Film Festival.

Thomas has also filmed documentaries for the Walpole Island First Nation, and directed episodes of the CBC docuseries Still Standing, for which she won a Canadian Screen Award for Best Direction in a Factual Program or Series at the 12th Canadian Screen Awards in 2024. She has also written for CTV's Shelved (2023) and CTV/APTN's Acting Good (2022).

In November 2024, Thomas was announced as entering production on Nika and Madison, a feature-length expansion of Redlights which is her full-length debut as a solo director. It premiered in the Discovery program at the 2025 Toronto International Film Festival.

== Personal life ==
Thomas is a member of the Walpole Island First Nation, and is also of Tohono O’odham, Cherokee and Scottish descent. She is based in Toronto and Wallaceburg, Ontario.

She is a dual citizen of Canada and the United States.
