= The Iowa Baseball Confederacy =

1986 novel by W.P. Kinsella

- First edition (publ. Houghton Mifflin)
- Author: W.P. Kinsella
- Language: English
- Publication date: 1986

The Iowa Baseball Confederacy is a 1986 novel written by Canadian author W.P. Kinsella. It is less well known than his novel Shoeless Joe, which came to prominence when it was made into the film Field of Dreams. Like in Shoeless Joe, baseball is at the heart of the novel, which uses magical realism to blend events and individuals past and present with the author's love of the game. However, it covers more themes than Shoeless Joe and it explores a greater number of plot lines.

== Plot ==
Gideon Clarke has two obsessions, baseball and playing the trumpet. His life in the small town of Onamata in Iowa in 1978 is dominated by his desire to prove the existence of the Iowa Baseball Confederacy, a minor league 'active' in the early part of the 20th century, and to show the world that a team from this league played against the Chicago Cubs in 1908. Gideon has plenty of time to pursue his baseball obsession since his father (who was killed by being struck on the head by a ball at a baseball game) has left him in a financial position where he has no need to work. Unfortunately, there is no shred of evidence that the Confederacy ever existed or that the game against the Cubs took place. An almost subconscious knowledge of the events of 1908 shared by both Gideon and his father has been the root cause of their life long obsession as they strive, unsuccessfully' to validate what they believe to be the truth.

Gideon is married to Sunny, with whom he is deeply in love in spite of her habit of disappearing for long periods without an explanation other than her desire to be free. He accepts these periodic disappearances philosophically, and we learn of the parallel to his mother Maudie who was working in a traveling show when she met and married Gideon's father. In the book both Maudie and Gideon's sister have long departed the family home, and we find out that his sister is on the run as an urban guerrilla. Following his father's death, Gideon is informally adopted by his neighbors the Barons who also care for a Down syndrome girl called Missy, for whom Gideon has a kind of brotherly affection. Gideon's best friend is called Stan; a minor league baseball player who dreams, in spite of the march of time that he can still make it in Major League Baseball.

When Gideon discovers that his neighbor John Baron once played in the Confederacy, he becomes convinced that some sort of rift in time can take him back to 1908 and provide the ultimate proof of the game against the Cubs. He meets up with Stan on the site of the old baseball ground and they slip seamlessly into July 1908. Gideon passes himself off as a sports writer and he is adopted as the Confederacy Mascot. Stan is introduced as a baseball player and later becomes a member of the Confederacy team. The game against the Cubs starts normally enough, but instead of the professionals crushing the local farmhands, it becomes a titanic struggle between two well matched teams, neither of whom will give way. Accepting a draw is unacceptable to either side and so the game continues day after day, with the Cubs refusing to return to Chicago to fulfil their allotted major league fixtures. Along with the game itself Gideon encounters a mythical Indian figure named Drifting Away who was punished centuries ago by his grandfathers. It gradually becomes clear that the shadowy Drifting Away is influencing the game in favor of the Confederacy and that his own future is linked to the outcome. Gideon also meets and falls in love with Sarah, with her membership of the Twelve-Hour Church giving him scope for sneaking away to spend many nights of love making with her.

Although the game starts normally enough it becomes increasingly surreal as it proceeds through its more than 2000 innings and weeks of play. Visitors to the game include the President of the US and Leonardo da Vinci. Players die or disappear and the later stages of the game are played in the pouring rain that increasingly threatens the town. The statue of the Black Angel from the local cemetery ends up playing in right field and batting .300. However, the more Gideon meets with Drifting Away, the more he realises that their paths are in conflict and he understands that his love affair with Sarah cannot end happily. The game is finally ended on Day 40 by Drifting Away striking a home run, with the town being simultaneously washed away. The next morning in the seemingly restored town Gideon witnesses Sarah become the first person in the county to be killed by a motor car. Gideon and Stan return to 1978, where Gideon realizes that Sunny is gone forever, and learns that John Baron is dead.

== Themes and Ideas ==
Readers must decide for themselves if the events of 1908 actually happened or if they were, as seems likely, merely a dream. Gideon is, of course, convinced that they were all real events. Apart from his obvious love of the game, the book explores some of W. P. Kinsella's favorite themes. While his lyrical writing about baseball is the core of the book, it is intertwined with the power of obsession, influence of dreams in shaping our destiny, the role of family, and the tragedy of love and loss.

== Reception ==
Kirkus Reviews reviewed it negatively, saying, "Here, he tries his hand at mixing the two elements, baseball and Indians, but after a brave start loses all control, doubles the sentimentality, and ends up sounding ridiculous."
