= Dance Me Outside (short story collection) =

1977 book by W. P. Kinsella

- First edition
- Author: W. P. Kinsella
- Publisher: Oberon Press
- Publication date: 1977

Dance Me Outside is a collection of short stories written by W. P. Kinsella in 1977.

The book contains stories narrated by Silas Ermineskin and is set on a Cree Indian reserve in Central Alberta and is about what happens in the lives of the people that live on the reserve.

== Film and television adaptions ==
In 1995, Bruce McDonald directed the film Dance Me Outside starring Ryan Black, Hugh Dillon, and Adam Beach, an adaption of the book by Kinsella. A year later in 1996, the television show The Rez was first aired, which was also an adaption of the book by Kinsella.
