= Ponikvar =

Ponikvar is a surname. Notable people with the surname include:

- Alja Ponikvar (born 2009), Slovene rhythmic gymnast
- Michael Ponikvar, Canadian athlete
- Veda Ponikvar (1919–2015), American publisher and businesswoman
