= Big Soul Productions =

Canadian film and TV production company

- Formation: 1999
- Founder: Laura J. Milliken & Jennifer Podemski
- Location: Toronto, Ontario

Big Soul Productions is a film and television production company based in Toronto, Ontario, Canada. It is notable for being Aboriginal owned and operated. Big Soul was established in August 1999 by Laura J. Milliken and Jennifer Podemski.

== Programs ==
From 2003 Big Soul produced Moccasin Flats, a dramatic series which subsequently was nominated for several Gemini Awards.

From 2001 to 2003, Big Soul Productions also produced three seasons of The Seventh Generation, a youth television series.

In 2000, Big Soul began a series of empowerment workshops titled repREZentin' to train Aboriginal youth in all areas of filmmaking. Many of these projects resulted in completed half-hour films that were broadcast on APTN, including the "Moccasin Flats", a short film which was later adapted into the television series.

Year	Title	Director
2008	By The Rapids (series)	Joseph Lazare
2008	Moccasin Flats: Redemption	Rob King
2007	I'm Not The Indian You Had In Mind	Thomas King
2007	By the Rapids	Joseph Lazare
2007	Good Looking	Joseph Lazare
2007	RoadMusic with Derek Miller	Laura Milliken
2006	133 Skyway	Randy Redroad
2006	Moccasin Flats Season 3	Various
2005	Moccasin Flats Season 2	Various
