= Nika and Madison =

2025 Canadian crime thriller film

- Film poster
- Directed by: Eva Thomas
- Written by: Eva Thomas; Michael McGowan
- Produced by: Eva Thomas
- Starring: Ellyn Jade; Star Slade; Shawn Doyle
- Cinematography: Jesse Wicklund
- Edited by: Jane MacRae
- Music by: Nigel Irwin
- Production company: Carousel Pictures
- Distributed by: Game Theory Films
- Release date: September 7, 2025 (TIFF)
- Running time: 87 minutes
- Country: Canada
- Language: English

Nika and Madison is a Canadian crime thriller film, directed by Eva Thomas and released in 2025. The film stars Ellyn Jade and Star Slade as the titular Nika and Madison, two indigenous women who are forced on the run after a police officer's attempt to sexually assault Madison leaves the officer hospitalized in a coma.

The cast also includes Shawn Doyle, David Reale, Amanda Brugel, Gail Maurice, Jennifer Podemski and Billy Merasty in supporting roles.

== Production ==
The film is Thomas's solo directorial debut following the 2024 film Aberdeen, which she co-directed with Ryan Cooper. It is a feature-length expansion of her 2023 short film Redlights.

It was shot in fall 2024, in and around Toronto.

== Distribution ==
The film has been acquired for distribution by Game Theory Films.

The film premiered in the Discovery program at the 2025 Toronto International Film Festival. It was also screened in the Borsos Competition program at the 2025 Whistler Film Festival.

== Awards ==
Award	Date of ceremony	Category	Nominee(s)	Result	Ref.
Directors Guild of Canada	2025	Best Direction in a Feature Film	Eva Thomas	Nominated	
Directors Guild of Canada	2025	Jean-Marc Vallée DGC Discovery Award	Eva Thomas	Longlisted	
