= William Kinsella =

William Kinsella is the name of:

- W. P. Kinsella (1935–2016), Canadian novelist
- William Kinsella (bishop), a Catholic bishop
