= Veda Ponikvar =

American businesswoman (1919–2015)

- Born: May 26, 1919; Chisholm, Minnesota, U.S.
- Died: October 13, 2015 (aged 96); Chisholm, Minnesota, U.S.
- Resting place: Chisholm Cemetery, Chisholm, Minnesota, U.S.
- Known for: Ownership and operation of the Chisholm Free Press and Chisholm Tribune Press

Veda Frances Ponikvar (May 26, 1919 – October 13, 2015) was an American publisher and businesswoman from Chisholm, Minnesota. The first female publisher in Minnesota, she was the owner and operator of the Free Press-Tribune for fifty years.

== Early life ==
Ponikvar was born in Chisholm, Minnesota, in 1919, the oldest of the five children of John Ponikvar, a miner, and Frances Globokar, Slovenian immigrants. Her father died in March 1952, at home in Chisholm, while her brother, John, was killed in the Korean War later in the year.

She was an honor graduate of Drake University's School of Journalism and Political Sciences in Des Moines, Iowa. In 1939, at the outbreak of World War II, she enlisted in the WAVES, with training taking place at Smith College in Northampton, Massachusetts. She was then assigned to naval intelligence in Washington, D.C., working at the World War I barracks on Constitution Avenue which were repurposed for naval offices. She was honorably discharged in 1946.

== Career ==
Ponikvar was portrayed by Anne Seymour in the 1989 movie Field of Dreams

At the end of the war, Ponikvar returned to Chisholm, where, in Minnesota's Iron Range, she founded the Chisholm Free Press, becoming the first female publisher in the state. The first edition was published on July 2, 1947. In 1955, she purchased the competing Chisholm Tribune Press, but published them separately: one on Tuesdays and one on Thursdays. She operated the newspapers for fifty years, and then as its publisher emeritus after selling the business to A. J. Kotyk in 1983. She contributed over 5,000 editorials. Her 1965 obituary for Archibald "Moonlight" Graham inspired W. P. Kinsella to travel to Chisholm during research for his 1982 novel Shoeless Joe. The obituary was read by Ponkivar (portrayed by Anne Seymour) in Field of Dreams, the 1989 film adaptation of the book. In 2005, Ponikvar threw the first pitch on Moonlight Graham Night at the Metrodome.

== Personal life and death ==
Ponikvar was a member of Chisholm's St. Joseph's Catholic Church and served on several community boards and commissions, including the Chisholm Community Education Board. She was a supporter and advocate for the Chisholm Armory, all veterans and the military. In 1987, she was appointed Civilian Aide to the Secretary of the Army for Minnesota. Four years later, the appointment was made permanent with emeritus status.

She was nicknamed "The Iron Lady."

Ponikvar died in 2015, at the age of 96. She was interred in Chisholm Cemetery.
