= A Young Girl in 1941 with No Waist at All =

- Short story by J. D. Salinger
- Language: English

Publication
- Published in: Mademoiselle
- Publication type: Magazine
- Media type: Short story
- Publication date: May 1947

"A Young Girl in 1941 with No Waist at All" is a short story by J. D. Salinger, published in Mademoiselle in May 1947. The story has not been published in any authorized anthology, but has appeared in the 1974 unauthorized collection Twenty-one Stories: The Complete Uncollected Short Stories of J. D. Salinger. The illustrator was Laura Jean Allen. The character of Ray Kinsella is seen as an early version of the character Seymour from Salinger's later work "A Perfect Day for Bananafish".

== Plot ==
The story is set in 1941 in the period before the entry of the U.S. in World War II. Barbara is on a cruise with her mother-in-law, Mrs. Odenhearn. Barbara is eighteen. She plans to marry Carl, who will enter the U.S. Navy.

On the cruise, she meets Ray Kinsella, who is twenty-two, waiting to be drafted in the U.S. Army. He is attracted to Barbara. They socialize on the cruise.

They both interact with a couple, Diane and Fielding Woodruff, who befriend them and offer advice.

Ray proposes marriage to Barbara, which she refuses.

In the final scene, Barbara decides not to marry Carl. The story is a coming of age tale. She is no longer a girl but a woman. She realizes that she has difficult choices ahead.

== Shoeless Joe and Field of Dreams ==
The story is also of interest to film buffs. The name of the main character, Ray Kinsella, is also the name of the main character in the 1982 book Shoeless Joe by W. P. Kinsella (who coincidentally shares the character's last name) which was adapted into the film Field of Dreams (1989).

W.P. Kinsella, who had never met Salinger, created a wholly imagined character (aside from his being a recluse) based on the author of The Catcher in the Rye, a book that had great meaning to him when he was a young man. To get a feel for Salinger, he re-read his body of work.

"I made sure to make him a nice character so that he couldn’t sue me."

Salinger had also used the surname shared by writer and protagonist in The Catcher in the Rye (Holden Caulfield's roommate Richard Kinsella).

Known for his litigiousness, Salinger contacted Kinsella's publisher via his attorneys to express outrage over having been portrayed in Shoeless Joe and intimated he would sue should the character "J. D. Salinger" appear in any other medium, should Shoeless Joe be adapted.

In the novel Shoeless Joe, Ray Kinsella seeks out J. D. Salinger, although in the film this character was renamed Terence Mann as the movie producers were worried over being sued by Salinger. The producers believed that it was not significant to jettison Salinger, as they figured only 15% of the potential audience would know who the author was. Kinsella told Maclean's Magazine in a 2010 interview on the death of Salinger that many of the book's readers believe that Salinger is a wholly fictional character.

Kinsella denied that Salinger, as a writer, had any real influence on his own writing.
