= Stryker (2004 film) =

- Directed by: Noam Gonick
- Written by: Noam Gonick; David McIntosh
- Produced by: Juliette Hagopian
- Starring: Kyle Henry; Ryan Rajendra Black; Tri Cao; Deena Fontaine; Nancy Sanderson; Brendan Canale; Kevin Cuddihy; Brent Neale
- Cinematography: Edward Lachman
- Edited by: Bruce Little
- Music by: Karman Omeosoo
- Production companies: Wild Boars of Manitoba, in association with Telefilm Canada
- Distributed by: Universal Home Video
- Release dates: 11 September 2004 (Venice Film Festival); 22 July 2005
- Running time: 93 minutes
- Country: Canada
- Language: English

Stryker is a 2004 film by Noam Gonick about gang violence in North End Winnipeg, Manitoba.

The film follows a 14-year-old arsonist (Kyle Henry) who becomes involved in a turf war between the Indian Posse and the Asian Bomb Squad (a now-defunct Filipino gang). He is known only as Stryker, a slang term for a prospective gang member.

Music for the film was composed by Karman Omeosoo of Team Rezofficial.

== Plot ==
Running away from his reserve after burning down a church, 14-year-old Stryker (Kyle Henry) ends up in North End, Winnipeg.

Becoming involved in a turf war, he is stuck between joining either the Indian Posse, led by an Indigenous lesbian named Mama Ceece (Deena Fontaine), recently released from jail; or the Asian Bomb Squad, a Filipino gang headed by Omar (Ryan Black), who is part-Indigenous.
