= The Dixon Cornbelt League and Other Baseball Stories =

Short story collection by W. P. Kinsella

First edition (publ. HarperCollins)

The Dixon Cornbelt League and Other Baseball Stories is a short story collection written by W. P. Kinsella. It was published in 1993.

== Synopsis ==
These nine stories from Kinsella all have the same general themes, centering on baseball, human nature, and the mystical.

The title story is about an undrafted college player's attempt to go pro. He catches on with a minor league team in a small Iowa town, where the atmosphere is light and the citizens welcoming. However, something isn't right about the new team...

Other stories in the collection are more surreal. For example, in "Eggs," an old pitcher is kept in his in-laws' home by some mysterious force.
