= Parkdale School =

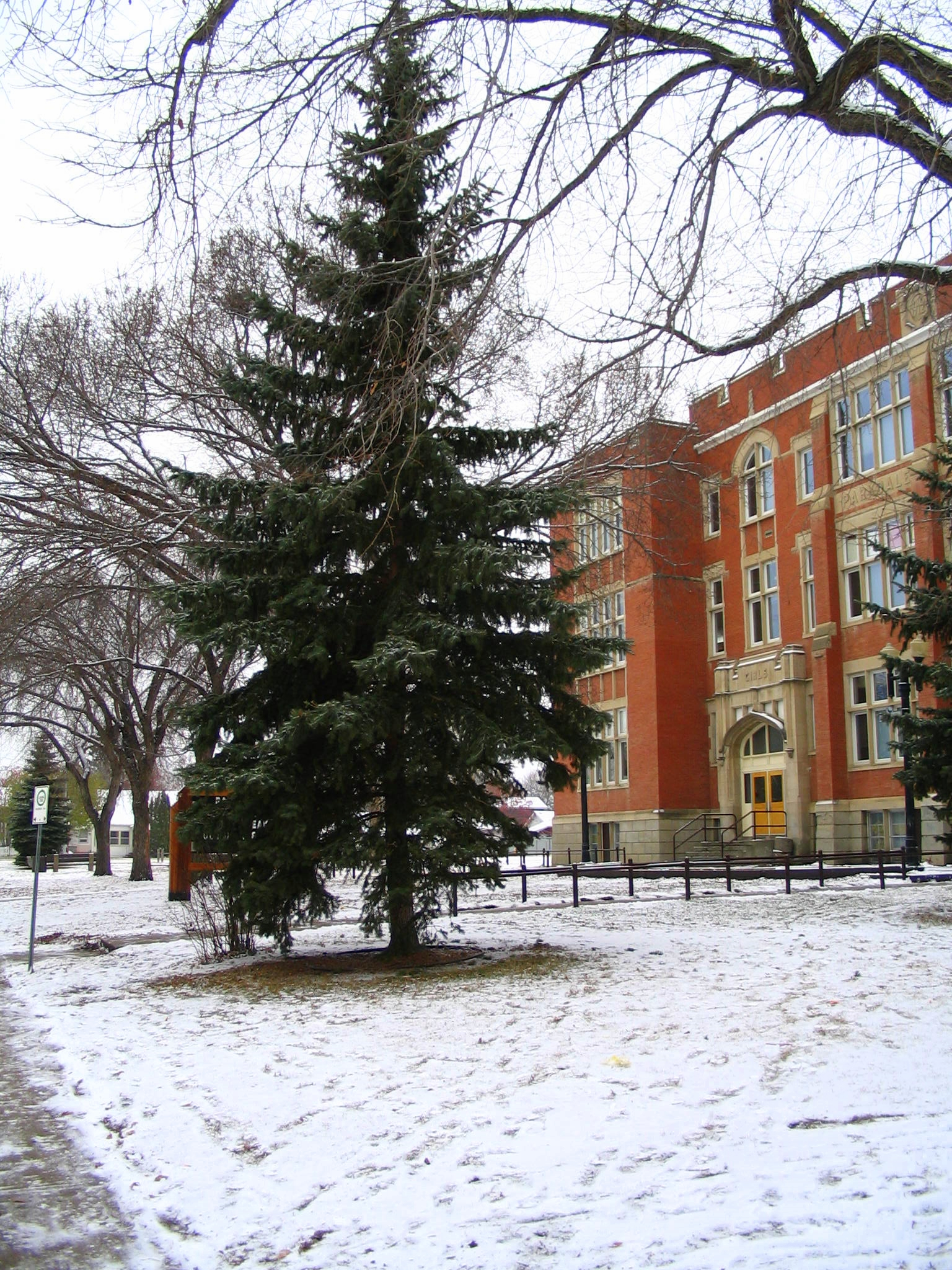

Location
- 11648 - 85 Street; Edmonton, Alberta, T5B 3E5; Canada; 53.5681°N 113.4724°W

Information
- School type: Public
- Founded: 1912
- Closed: 2010
- School board: Edmonton Public Schools
- Grades: K-9
- Mascot: Phoenix

Parkdale School was a city centre K-9 public school located in Edmonton, Alberta, Canada. Built in 1912, it is one of Edmonton's oldest schools. Parkdale was one of seven schools belonging to the Edmonton Public Schools City Centre Education Project.

During its final years of operation, Parkdale was one of five Edmonton Public Schools that operated on a modified school calendar. Students attended classes the same number of days as other schools, but breaks were spread differently throughout the year. Instead of the customary two month summer holiday that is enjoyed by other Edmonton students, Parkdale’s summer holiday was condensed to five weeks in July. The intent of the modified school year was to keep students engaged and able to retain knowledge easier after breaks.

Roughly 60% of Parkdale students were of aboriginal heritage, and the school's programs and methods often reflected this. Aboriginal awareness and culture were integrated into classroom learning. Optional Cree language and Cree culture courses were offered to its grade 7-9 students.

== Architecture ==
Parkdale was built in 1912 for $1,000,000. Its Collegiate Gothic style is considered an uninspired version of the Gothic Revival design and was common for educational buildings built in Canada from 1900 to 1925. The three-storey building constructed of brick and Bedford trim features a crenulated roof line, Tudor arches, buttressing, a crest inscribed with the construction date, and traditional separate entrances for boys and girls.

In 1919, to ease overcrowding at other area schools, four classrooms were added to the third floor. In 1957 a $805,000 gymnasium was built on the east side of the building. The fourth floor gymnasium was converted into classrooms and a library.

== History ==
=== 1912 fire ===
Parkdale School was scheduled to open on April 13, 1913, but was delayed a month due to a fire which cost more than $20,000. The mythological Phoenix was chosen as the school mascot because it symbolizes their principle, rising from the ashes, and Parkdale School rose from ashes too.

=== Closing ===
Parkdale School was closed on June 19, 2010. The subject received much controversy from concerned parents and people who live close by. The building is currently leased to Bent Arrow Traditional Healing Society and is being used as their main office.

=== Students ===
- Edgar (Spike) Millen, the Royal Canadian Mounted Police officer who was killed in 1932 by Albert Johnson—the Mad Trapper of Rat Creek—studied at Parkdale from 1913-1920.
- Seven members of the Edmonton Grads girls basketball team first played the game in Parkdale's third floor gymnasium before moving on to McDougall Commercial High School. At one point the Grads starting line-up was composed of all Parkdale girls. From 1915 to 1940, the Grads won 502 of 522 games, held 108 local, provincial, national, and international titles.
- Dr. Boris Boyko joined the Glen Sather Sports Medicine Clinic as a consultant in 1994. He has served as an Edmonton Oilers team doctor and is currently an Edmonton Eskimos medical staff member.
- W.P. Kinsella, author of many novels including the baseball novel "Shoeless Joe", later turned into the motion picture Field of Dreams, attended at least grade 9 at Parkdale School in 1949.
