= The Alligator Report =

1985 book by W. P. Kinsella

- First edition
- Author: W. P. Kinsella
- Language: English
- Genre: Story Stories
- Publisher: Coffee House Press
- Publication date: 1985
- Publication place: United States
- ISBN: 0-918273-10-2

The Alligator Report is a collection of short stories written by W. P. Kinsella and was published in 1985.

The Alligator Report contains 26 short stories written by W. P. Kinsella and is 134 pages long. The Alligator Report also includes another short story written by Kinsella called The Last Pennant Before Armageddon and also introduces the character Trout Fishing in America Shorty, a character from Richard Brautigan's novel Trout Fishing in America. Richard Brautigan's Trout Fishing in America was a major influence for Kinsella to write The Alligator Report.
