= Bliss (Canadian TV series) =

Canadian erotic television series

- Created by: Adrienne Mitchell; Janis Lundman
- Starring: Cara Pifko; Kelly Ricard; Andrew Tarbet; Allen Altman; Thea Gill; Jennifer Podemski
- Country of origin: Canada
- No. of seasons: 3
- No. of episodes: 24

Production
- Running time: 30 min (including commercials)
- Production companies: Galafilm; Back Alley Film Productions

Original release
- Network: Showcase
- Release: March 21, 2002 – April 4, 2004

Bliss is a Canadian half-hour drama television series, produced by Montreal-based Galafilm and Toronto-based Back Alley Films, an anthology of women's erotica. The series ran from 2002 to 2004.

The format of the show—short, sensual vignettes adapted for television—aired on Oxygen in the United States (though heavily edited for American audiences) and Showcase, TMN and Movie Central in Canada. Reruns currently air on US After Dark, and with Spanish dubbing on Telelatino Network (TLN) as Cuentos Prohibidos (Forbidden Tales) in Canada. The series is distributed by Oasis International in Toronto.

== Plot ==
This Showcase Original Series explores erotic desires, passions and fantasies of women from a female perspective, with the episodes themselves directed and written by women.

== Episode list ==
=== Season 1 ===
1. Valentine's Day in Jail A woman (Torri Higginson) falls in love with an inmate (Adam Beach) after she is assigned by her company to commission an article written by him.

2. Six Days A rugged country housewife (Michèle Duquet) has a torrid affair with her lover, a hired ranch hand (Callum Keith Rennie) after her husband is hospitalized after an injury.

3. Guys and Dolls A business woman (Jennie Levine) meets a mysterious business man (Peter Wingfield) at a bar with the intentions of a no strings attached sexual fling. Their relationship becomes too close for comfort when they realize they have more in common professionally than merely sexually.

4. The Value of X A soon to be high school graduate (Tara Spencer-Nairn) experiments with sexuality and gender expression.

5. Voice A woman (Mikela J. Mikael) begins having paranormal experiences after being in a relationship with a married man (David Lovgren). She becomes haunted by the apparition of his current wife. The tables are turned when she begins yearning for the touch of his wife than the actual arms of the married man she loves.

6. Leaper A struggling writer (Michelle Anne Lipper) weighed down with depression is attacked by a disturbed and helpless young girl. The writer is in shock as she meets the lover of the frightened girl (Poule Ducharme), unbeknownst to the writer at the time of meeting. The writer and the young girl's older lover engage in a lesbian sexual encounter.

7. The Footpath of Pink Roses A young woman (Victoria Sanchez) who is into MMA-style self-defense is taken for a loop when her sexual desires take a turn for the primal. Her vanilla boyfriend (David Pauls) is conflicted about her desires after she asks him to "force" her to make love to him and suggests they forget it ever happened. She meets a handsome self-defense teacher (Maurizio Terrazzano) who helps her express her inner desires to be passionately ravaged by the man of her choosing.

8. In Praise of Drunkenness and Fornication Three couples meet up for a regular dinner party. The couples are each in different phases of life, age wise. There is jealousy that erupts as the older couples are envious of the younger couples. As the night continues the youngest couple leaves. The two older couples are left to drink and mull over hidden desires. The night ends with the two remaining couples switching partners for the evening. Starring Gina Wilkinson, Peggy Mahon and pop singer Mitsou.

=== Season 2 ===
1. Three A woman (Jennifer Podemski) and her two close male friends all live together. They realize over discussing past relationships that maybe there is a reason for them not finding the "one" and that reason might very well be that they belong together, all three of them.

2. Nina's Muse A woman (Thea Gill) who only finds desire in monogamous love takes a turn for the wild side when she voyeuristically takes images of her male neighbor engaged in gay sex.

3. Cat Got Your Tongue A mature older woman (Wendel Meldrum) discovers her lust for younger men after encountering her son's hunky new friend Palo (Mark Taylor). Soon she realizes the desire is a very mutual thing between her and this vivacious young man.

4. The Marvellon An older lipstick lesbian (Lynda Boyd) meets a young butch drag king (Lauren Evans) who turns her world upside down by pushing her to consider different forms of gender expression in sexual contexts. Also featuring Liliana Komorowska.

5. Chastity A soon-to-be nun (Cara Pifko) about to take her final vows begins to have doubts if she can follow the vow of chastity when she expresses her feelings for her close male friend (Andrew Tarbet).

6. Office Management An older business woman (Rachel Hayward) disillusioned with romance begins a sexual relationship with a hopelessly romantic younger man (David Cook).

7. The Piano Tuner A lonely neglected piano-playing housewife (Shannon Lawson) has a chance encounter with a handsome blind piano tuner (Alan van Sprang).

8. Aural Sex A recently jobless woman (Raven Dauda) becomes enthralled with her boyfriend's (Danny Gilmore) erotic radio show. Little does he know she had a hand in writing the scandalous BDSM oriented material he reads week after week and plans on making fantasy become reality in their very own bedroom.

=== Season 3 ===
1. Tango A recently jobless woman (Larissa Gomes) moves into a new town in hope of better work after ending an affair with her married boss and ends up meeting a charming but presumptuous man (Victor Gomez) who she assumes is married. Passions flare as she fights against getting seduced by yet another married man.

2. Penelope and Her Suitors Penelope (Stephanie Morgenstern) is a woman who prefers solitude. However, everyone around her thinks she should date or date them. For some reason men are drawn to Penelope and she begins a brief fling with the cable guy (Sebastian Spence). This does not lead Penelope to settle down, but to consider men as potential sexual partners and maybe more.

3. Tying Up Gerald A man with a secret BDSM kink of being submissive (Peter Wingfield) sees a professional dominatrix (Katya Gardner) behind his wife's (Shary Guthrie) back fearing she wouldn't understand his desires. To save her marriage she is taken under the wing of her husband's dominatrix where she learns the art of sexual dominance and the erotic appeal of being sexually submissive.

4. Badness Two strait-laced lawyers (Zoie Palmer and Andrew Airlie) face off in a battle of temptation.

5. Amazon A strong masculine woman (Jessica Greco) meets her match in a fellow hockey player (James Gallanders). The struggle begins when he realizes she is set on not conforming to traditional feminine behavior just so he will date her.

6. The Arrangement A strong intelligent Indian astrophysicist (Pamela Sinha) goings on a date with man (Cas Anvar) who was arranged by her parents to be her future husband. Little does he know that the old way of doing things is far from what she is interested in. She also underestimates his ability to be adaptable to new ideas and experiences outside of old traditional ways.

7. Les Petits Mots A DJ (Patricia McKenzie) and a bookstore owner (Michel Francoeur) clash over ideology, new technology vs the old way of doing things. The only thing more stimulating than their debates is their fiery passion for each other.

8. Steph's Life For her sociology project, Steph (Robin Brûlé) installs a video camera that is hooked up to a website where her kitchen is streaming online 24/7 for the duration of her project. Her boyfriend (Allan Hawco) points out she has a very basic daily routine and that the people who watch her must find it soothing. Despite his approval of her predictable behavior she challenges it by sexualizing her cam show beginning with a kiss between them, following by a sensual strip tease. All of this is easily seen by hundreds of anonymous eyes via the internet.

== Home media ==
MTI Home Video has released all three seasons on DVD in Region 1.

DVD name	Ep #	Release date
The Complete First Season	8	August 23, 2005
The Complete Second Season	8	September 26, 2006
The Complete Third and Final Season	8	September 25, 2007

== See also ==
- Lesbian erotica
