= The Rez =

Canadian drama television series

- Genre: Drama
- Based on: Dance Me Outside (film) by Bruce McDonald; Dance Me Outside (short story collection) by W. P. Kinsella
- Country of origin: Canada
- Original language: English
- No. of seasons: 2
- No. of episodes: 19

Production
- Executive producers: Bruce McDonald; Norman Jewison

Original release
- Network: CBC
- Release: February 2, 1996 – April 26, 1997

The Rez is a Canadian drama television series that aired on CBC Television from 1996 to 1997. Bruce McDonald and Norman Jewison were executive producers of the series, which chronicled life in an Ojibwe community. The series is based on the short story collection Dance Me Outside by W. P. Kinsella and its 1994 film adaptation by McDonald. It was cancelled after two seasons.

== Cast ==
- Ryan Rajendra Black – Silas Crow
- Jennifer Podemski – Sadie Maracle
- Darrell Dennis – Frank Fencepost
- Tamara Podemski – Lucy Pegahmagabow
- Elaine Miles – Mad Etta (season 2)
- Gary Farmer – Chief Tom
- Adam Beach – (played Frank Fencepost in Dance Me Outside, but was recast in the series as "Charlie")
- Kari Matchett – Tanya Nanibush
- Patricia Collins – Eleanor Nanibush
- Herbie Barnes – Joseph Crow
- Monique Mojica – Mad Etta (Season 1)
- Shirley Cheechoo – Simone Crow

== Production ==
Bruce McDonald was executive producer with Norman Jewison. Most of the characters were based on W. P. Kinsella's short story collection Dance Me Outside, which had been made into a film by McDonald.

The series was filmed in the Parry Sound region at Harrison Landing in Carling Township. All episodes run around 23 minutes.

The name of the reservation, "Kidabaneesee", is a word made up by the producers.

== Episodes and synopsis ==
=== Pilot film (1994) ===
- Dance Me Outside (84 minutes)

=== Season 1 (1996) ===
- "Dressed Like a Fish" – The marina's owner dies. For fun Frank stages his own mock funeral with the others. Who will take over the marina?
- "Golf and Politics" – Sadie organizes a boycott against the bar/marina and insists that Silas and Frank quit working for Eleanor, the new owner.
- "A Little Revealing" – Sadie showcases her revealing wear to Silas after Silas is asked to become a male stripper.
- "The Longhouse" – Frank locks Lucy in a shack in hopes she will think and reconsider her plans to leave for Toronto.
- "The Lark" – Silas' mentally impaired brother goes to a group home.
- "Dirty Girls, Kill Kill!" – Frank hires strippers to fight in a vat of pudding to raise money. Sadie is upset by what she sees as sexism.

=== Season 2 (1997) ===
- "Strange Bedfellows" – A stranger comes to run for chief versus Chief Tom. Sadie backs him at first, until Charlie digs up his past (and present) behavior.
- "They Call Her Tanya" – Eleanor's daughter is introduced to the Rez. All the boys are looking her way.
- "Poster Girl" – Local girls are asked to try out to become a cover girl for a clothing line. Sadie is against it at first, but—when she is chosen as the model—she changes her tune.
- "Like Father, Like Son" – Silas' birth father comes back to the Rez, but Silas is not happy about it. His father is given the sentence of living alone on an island to win back the respect of the locals.
- "Granted" – The reservation band announces a $5000 youth grant.
- "Lust" – Silas' challenged brother, Joseph, traumatizes a young girl with unwanted touch.
- "Windigo" – Silas and Frank think they are cursed and must fight and defeat the Windigo spirit.
- "No Way to Treat a Lady" – Frank likes Tanya, but Tanya likes Charlie, which causes friction at a party. More friction is happening elsewhere when Eleanor and Simone are being hit on by three troublemakers at a bar.
- "A Rock and a Hard Place" – Charlie and Tanya's relationship grows. Meanwhile, he, Silas and Frank are working for a racist construction foreman. Frank gets revenge on the foreman in an explosive finale.
- "Der deutsche Indianer" – A German historian comes to the Rez to learn some native stories from Silas and Frank. The only problem is that he knows more native stories and history than the boys do.
- "Too Many Chiefs" – Sadie takes over from Chief Tom.
- "No Reservations Part 1" – Silas finds Sadie in bed with another man. Frank sees Lucy working the streets of Toronto.
- "No Reservations Part 2" – Frank tries to rescue Lucy from working the streets. Silas wants Sadie back.

== Awards and nominations ==
At the 1997 Gemini Awards, Jennifer Podemski was nominated for "Best Performance by an Actress in a Continuing Leading Dramatic Role" for the episode "Golf and Politics".

At the 1998 Gemini Awards, Patricia Collins was nominated for "Actress in a Featured Supporting Role in a Dramatic Series" for the episode "They Call Her Tanya". Producer Brian Dennis was also awarded the Canada Choice Award for this episode. Also at the 1998 Gemini Awards, Ryan Rajendra Black was nominated for "Best Performance by an Actor in a Continuing Leading Dramatic Role" for the episode "Lust".

== Etymology ==
The word rez is North American slang for First Nations Reserve and signifies an area of land held and governed by First Nations that is legally recognized by the Canadian government.
