= Moccasin Flats =

Canadian drama television series

- Created by: Laura Milliken; Jennifer Podemski
- Theme music composer: Jonathan Garlow
- Composer: Donald Quan
- Country of origin: Canada
- Original language: English
- No. of seasons: 3
- No. of episodes: 22

Production
- Running time: 30 minutes
- Production companies: Big Soul Productions; Stephen Onda Productions

Original release
- Network: Aboriginal Peoples Television Network; Showcase Television
- Release: November 10, 2003 – March 28, 2006

Moccasin Flats is a Canadian drama television series that ran for three full seasons. The show, which has aired on the Aboriginal Peoples Television Network (APTN) and Showcase Television since 2004, is co-produced by Big Soul Productions Inc. (Toronto) and Stephen Onda Productions Inc. (Regina). It takes place in Moccasin Flats, Regina, Saskatchewan, an urban reserve where the inhabitants struggle to maintain their cultural identity while overcoming poverty, gangs, violence, and racism. The series features award-nominated actor Andrea Menard and original music by Donald Quan.

The original incarnation of Moccasin Flats was as a 2002 short of the same title. This movie was the product of an Indigenous youth media empowerment workshop called repREZentin', which teamed Indigenous youth with industry professionals in an effort to create short films and videos that told their stories. The short told the story of Justin, a young Indigenous man who has just found that he has been accepted to university. While he is grateful for the opportunity, he is afraid to leave his friends and family (particularly his younger brother) behind in the harsh neighbourhood of Moccasin Flats. His fears are compounded when his archrival, who is also the former pimp of his ex-prostitute girlfriend, is released from jail and back into the Flats.

The popularity of the short film led to the creation of the Moccasin Flats television series that starred many of the youth from the original film.

The third season of Moccasin Flats was nominated for three Gemini Awards. It is the first Indigenous-created, produced, and controlled dramatic series in North America.

== Cast and characters ==
- Tantoo Cardinal as Betty Merasty
- Gordon Tootoosis as Joe Redsky
- Andrea Menard as Const. Amanda Strongeagle
- Ryan Rajendra Black as Devlin Day
- Sarah Podemski as Tara
- Matthew Strongeagle as Matthew Merasty
- Ron Harris as Red
- Landon Montour as Jonathan Bearclaw
- Candace Fox as Candy
- Jennifer Podemski as Deb Johnson
- Cheri Maracle as Mrs. Wolfe

== Season synopses ==
=== Season 1 (2003) ===
In the inner-city community of Moccasin Flats, Dillon Redsky has to survive one last summer before he gets out of the ghetto and goes to university to pursue his dreams of becoming a basketball star. Unfortunately for Dillon, some people don't want to see him succeed. Dillon's childhood friend, Jonathan, a local gangster and pimp, tries to make Dillon's life a nightmare when he falls for one of his sex workers and tries to get her off the streets.

=== Season 2 (2004) ===
Jonathan has given up his life of pimping and drug dealing in order to be reunited with his girlfriend and son. He is working hard to turn his life around and be a good father and boyfriend, but when his debts start piling up, the temptations of ghetto life get the better of him. He decides to use his home-based vitamin company as a cover for a crystal meth operation and run the other drug dealers out of the neighbourhood.

=== Season 3 (2006) ===
Now that Jonathan has cleaned up his act, a new pimp has taken over and there is an influx of very young girls working the streets of Moccasin Flats. When the cops continually turn a blind eye to these dead or beaten youngsters, Candy, a local social worker, launches her own investigation—risking her own life as she tries to find the pimp and get him put behind bars.

== Streaming ==
In 2017, the series was released online on the Canada Media Fund's Encore+ YouTube channel.

== Moccasin Flats: Redemption ==
In 2008, a made-for-TV movie based on the television series aired, entitled Moccasin Flats: Redemption.
