= Butterfly Winter =

2011 novel by W.P. Kinsella

First edition

Butterfly Winter was the seventh novel published by the late Canadian writer W.P. Kinsella. The story of Julio and Esteban Pimental, twins whose divine destiny for baseball begins with games of catch in the womb, the novel marks a return to form, combining his long-held passions of baseball and magical realism.

== Return to novels ==
Butterfly Winter was the first fiction published by Kinsella after a 14-year hiatus, after he suffered brain damage from a car accident. It was published on September 1, 2011, by 'Winnipeg, Manitoba's Enfield and Wizenty, a small press specializing in limited edition hardcover books. The unpublished manuscript of the novel had already won the Colophon Prize in March 2011. The release was backed up by a "modest" book tour, according to the publisher. The University of Toronto Press released a trade hardcover edition on October 1. A short story of Kinsella's by the same title was included in his 1988 collection, Red Wolf, Red Wolf published by Totem Press(Collins Publishers).
