= Moose TV =

- Written by: Paul Quarrington
- Directed by: Tim Southam
- Starring: Adam Beach; Gary Farmer; Jennifer Podemski; Nathaniel Arcand; Michelle Latimer; Diane Flacks; Billy Merasty
- Country of origin: Canada
- Original language: English

Original release
- Network: Showcase
- Release: 2007 – 2008

Moose TV is a Canadian television sitcom, airing on Showcase in the 2007-2008 television season.

The series stars Adam Beach as George Keeshig, a Cree from the fictional community of Moose in northern Quebec, who returns home after a decade living in Toronto to become manager of the local community television station. The cast also includes Gary Farmer, Jennifer Podemski, Nathaniel Arcand, Michelle Latimer, Diane Flacks, and Billy Merasty. The series' head writer is Paul Quarrington. The series was directed by Tim Southam.

Produced by Rezolution Pictures for the Showcase network in Canada, the series received the Indie Award for Best Comedy Series from the Canadian Film and Television Producers Association in 2008.
