= Dance Me Outside =

- Directed by: Bruce McDonald
- Written by: John Frizzell; Bruce McDonald; Don McKellar
- Based on: Dance Me Outside by W. P. Kinsella
- Produced by: Brian Dennis; Bruce McDonald; Duke Redbird
- Starring: Ryan Black; Adam Beach; Lisa LaCroix; Michael Greyeyes; Kevin Hicks; Jennifer Podemski; Sandrine Holt
- Cinematography: Miroslaw Baszak
- Edited by: Michael Pacek
- Music by: Mychael Danna, Keith Secola
- Distributed by: A-Pix Entertainment; Shadow Shows Distribution; Cineplex Odeon Films
- Release date: September 1994 (TIFF)
- Running time: 84 minutes
- Country: Canada
- Language: English
- Box office: $304,852 (USA)

Dance Me Outside is a 1994 Canadian drama film, directed by Bruce McDonald. It was based on the book Dance Me Outside by W.P. Kinsella.

The film premiered at the 1994 Toronto International Film Festival, before going into commercial release in 1995.

== Plot ==
On the Kidabanesee reserve in Northern Ontario lives Silas Crow (Ryan Black), a young man looking for direction in life. He is uncertain about taking an automobile mechanic's course in college. His general confusion with life is most readily evident in his appearance. He wears an old ratty black fedora, a strange assortment of cargo pants, as well as a long, black trench coat. Frank Fencepost (Adam Beach) is Crow's best friend, and Sadie Maracle (Jennifer Podemski) is his girlfriend.

A young girl from the reserve is murdered by Clarence Gaskill (Hugh Dillon); the white man's sentence is light, leading the community to demand justice or vengeance.

== Cast ==
Main

- Ryan Black as Silas Crow. an 18 year old aspiring mechanic struggling to write a short narrative of his home.
- Adam Beach as Frank Fencepost, Silas's best friend, who joins him in becoming a mechanic.
- Lisa LaCroix as Illianna, Silas's Sister
- Michael Greyeyes as Gooch, Illiana's ex-boyfriend who returns home from prison
- Jennifer Podemski as Sadie Maracle
- Tamara Podemski as Little Margaret
- Sandrine Holt as Poppy

== Production ==
Dance Me Outside was the first acting role for Dillon, who was previously known as a rock singer. He later starred in McDonald's Hard Core Logo, and has since gone on to become an acclaimed actor in television series such as Durham County and Flashpoint.

The rock band Leslie Spit Treeo and singer-songwriter Vern Cheechoo appeared in the film, performing in concert at the reserve's community hall, "The Blue Quill Hall". Blue Quill is a borrowed name of a community in W.P. Kinsella's hometown of Edmonton. Other contributors to the soundtrack included the folk music duo Kashtin, singer-songwriter Keith Secola and Dillon's band The Headstones, as well as previously recorded songs by Redbone and The Ramones, and an instrumental score by Mychael Danna.

The film was shot primarily on the Shawanaga and Wasauksing First Nations reserves near Parry Sound, with a small amount of location shooting in Parry Sound.

== Television series ==
A television series, The Rez, was spun off from the film in 1996. In the series, Frank Fencepost was played by Darrel Dennis instead of Adam Beach, who was instead given the role of the chief's son, Charlie. Ryan Black and Jennifer Podemski kept their roles, while Podemski's sister Tamara played a new character named Lucy.

== Awards ==
The film won two Genie Awards at the 16th Genie Awards in 1996, for Best Editing (Michael Pacek) and Best Sound Editing (Steve Munro, Andy Malcolm, Michael Pacek, Peter Winninger and Michael Werth). It was also nominated, but did not win, for Best Overall Sound (Keith Elliott, Peter Kelly, Daniel Pellerin and Ross Redfern).

== Availability ==
After the film's spring 1995 theatrical run, the film was released on videocassette in 1995 by A-Pix Entertainment and in Canada that same year by Cineplex Odeon. The Canadian tape contained the music video for "Cemetery" performed by The Headstones. Video Service Corporation released the film on DVD in 2008.
