= Phil Alden Robinson =

American film director and screenwriter (born 1950)

- Born: March 1, 1950 (age 76); Long Beach, New York, U.S.
- Occupation: Film director; screenwriter
- Years active: 1981–present
- Known for: Field of Dreams; Sneakers
- Spouse: Paulette Holland Bartlett (m. 2009)

Phil Alden Robinson (born March 1, 1950) is an American film director and screenwriter whose films include Field of Dreams, Sneakers, and The Sum of All Fears.

== Early life and education ==
Robinson was born in Long Beach, New York, the son of Jessie Frances and S. Jesse Robinson, who was a drama critic for the New York Journal American and a media coordinator for the liquor division of the National Distillers & Chemical Corp. in New York. Robinson graduated from Union College in Schenectady, New York, with a Bachelor of Arts degree in political science and received an Honorary Doctorate of Letters from Union College in 1996.

== Career ==
Robinson directed the baseball film Field of Dreams (1989). Field of Dreams earned Robinson nominations for the Directors Guild of America Award, the Writers Guild of America Award, and for an Oscar for Best Screenplay Adaptation (the film was also nominated for Best Picture and Best Original Score Oscars). Other accolades for the film include the Christopher Award, and Premiere Magazine's Readers Poll for Best Picture of 1989.

His next feature was the thriller Sneakers (1992). Sneakers was nominated for an Edgar Award by the Mystery Writers of America.

Robinson's 2000 TV drama Freedom Song won the Writers Guild of America Award for Best Original Longform Screenplay, was nominated for two Emmy Awards, three NAACP Image Awards (including Best TV Movie), a Screen Actors Guild Award, a Sound Editors Golden Reel Award, and the Humanitas Prize. It also received the Christopher Award, the San Francisco Film Society's "Golden Gate Award", and a National Association of Minorities in Communications Image Award.

For Band of Brothers (2001), he, along with all the directors on the series, won an Emmy Award for Best Directing of a Miniseries, Movie or Dramatic Special. Robinson and the other Band of Brother directors were also nominated for a Directors Guild of America Award.

In 1990, Robinson was named "Screenwriter of the Year" by the National Association of Theatre Owners, and in 1994 received the Writers Guild of America's Valentine Davies Award for contributions to the entertainment industry and the community-at-large.

In 1992, he accompanied the United Nations High Commission for Refugees as an observer on relief missions to Somalia and Bosnia, for which he wrote and directed his first of five documentaries for ABC News Nightline. The last one, Sarajevo Spring, was nominated for a national News & Documentary Emmy Award in 1997.

Robinson is currently Vice President of the Academy of Motion Picture Arts and Sciences, is a past member of the board of directors of the Writers Guild of America, and serves on the Board of Overseers of the UCLA Hammer Museum.

== Filmography ==
| Year | Title | Director | Writer | Producer | Notes |
|---|---|---|---|---|---|
| 1984 | Rhinestone | | Yes | | |
| 1984 | All of Me | | Yes | | |
| 1985 | Fletch | | Yes | | Uncredited |
| 1987 | In the Mood | Yes | Yes | | |
| 1989 | Relentless | | Yes | | as Jack T.D. Robinson |
| 1989 | Field of Dreams | Yes | Yes | | |
| 1990 | Ghost Dad | | Yes | | as Chris Reese |
| 1992 | Sneakers | Yes | Yes | | |
| 1996 | The Chamber | | Yes | | as Chris Reese |
| 2000 | Freedom Song | Yes | Yes | | |
| 2002 | The Sum of All Fears | Yes | | | |
| 2014 | The Angriest Man in Brooklyn | Yes | | | |

== Television ==
| Year | Title | Director | Writer | Producer | Notes |
|---|---|---|---|---|---|
| 1981 | Trapper John, M.D. | | Yes | | 2 episodes |
| 1992 | Nightline: Somalia Diary | | Yes | | |
| 1992 | Nightline: Sarajevo Diary | | Yes | | |
| 1993 | Nightline: One Woman’s Sarajevo | | Yes | | |
| 1996 | Nightline: Sarajevo Spring | | Yes | | |
| 2001 | Band of Brothers | Yes | | | 1 episode |
| 2016 | The Good Wife | Yes | | | 1 episode |
| 2018 | The Good Fight | | Yes | | Also creator |

== Awards and nominations ==
| Year | Award | Category | Nominated work | Result |
|---|---|---|---|---|
| 1989 | Academy Awards | Best Adapted Screenplay | Field of Dreams | Nominated |
| 2001 | Writers Guild Award | Best Original Longform | Freedom Song | Won |
| 2002 | Emmy Awards | Directing for a Miniseries or Made-for-TV Movie | Band of Brothers | Won |
| 2009 | Emmy Awards | Writing For a Variety, Music or Comedy Special | 81st Academy Awards | Nominated |
