= Adam Beach =

Canadian actor (b. 1972)

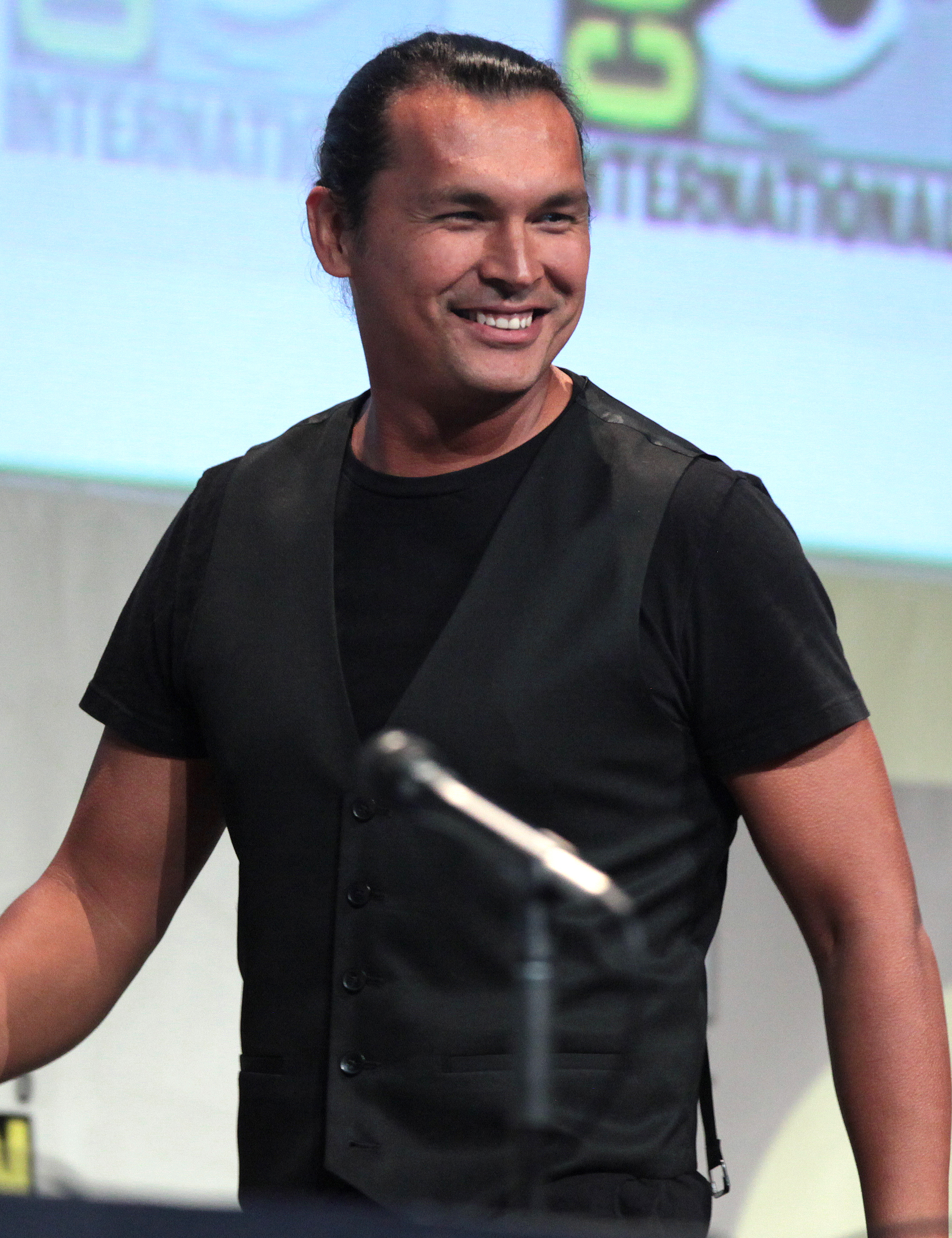
- Beach at the 2015 San Diego Comic-Con
- Born: November 11, 1972 (age 53); Ashern, Manitoba, Canada
- Occupation: Actor
- Years active: 1990–present
- Spouses: Meredith Porter (m. 1999; div. 2002) Tara Mason (m. 2003; div. 2007) Summer Tiger (m. 2015)
- Children: 3

Adam Rueben Beach (born November 11, 1972) is a Canadian actor. He is best known for his roles as Victor Joseph in Smoke Signals; Frank Fencepost in Dance Me Outside; Tommy on Walker, Texas Ranger; Kickin' Wing in Joe Dirt; US Marine Corporal Ira Hayes in Flags of Our Fathers; Private Ben Yahzee in Windtalkers; Dr. Charles Eastman (Ohiyesa) in Bury My Heart at Wounded Knee; NYPD Detective Chester Lake in Law & Order: Special Victims Unit; and Officer Jim Chee in the film adaptations of Skinwalkers, Coyote Waits and A Thief of Time. He starred in the Canadian 2012–2014 series Arctic Air and played Slipknot in the 2016 film Suicide Squad. He also performed as Squanto in Disney's historical drama film Squanto: A Warrior's Tale. Most recently he has starred in Hostiles (2017) as Black Hawk and the Netflix original film Juanita (2019) as Jess Gardiner and Edward Nappo in Jane Campion's The Power of the Dog.

== Early life ==
Adam Beach was born in Ashern, Manitoba. He is Saulteaux Anishinaabe and has some Icelandic roots through his great-grandmother. Beach spent his early years with his parents and two brothers on the Lake Manitoba/Dog Creek First Nation Reserve at Lake Manitoba. When Beach was eight years old, his mother, Sally Beach, eight months pregnant with a baby girl, was killed by a drunk driver. Eight weeks after his mother's death, the family discovered their father Dennis Beach had drowned near the community. It is unclear whether his death was an accident or suicide.

Adam and his two brothers initially lived with their grandmother; he was with her from age 8 to 12. Five years after their parents' deaths, the three brothers were taken to Winnipeg to live with an aunt and paternal uncle: Agnes and Chris Beach (his father's brother). Adam refers to his Uncle Chris as "Dad".

Beach attended a drama class at Gordon Bell High School. He began performing in local theatre productions and eventually dropped out of school to take a lead role at the Manitoba Theatre for Young People.

== Career ==
Beach has a long list of diverse portrayals. He saw acting as a catharsis and turned to theatre as a venue to express his feelings and tell his own personal stories. At age 18, Beach won a small role in the miniseries Lost in the Barrens, based on the Farley Mowat novel. In the following years, he continued to work in local theatre and guest-starred on television shows such as Walker, Texas Ranger and Touched by an Angel. Shortly afterwards, Beach was cast as a regular on the television shows North of 60 and The Rez. After his performance in Dance Me Outside, he starred in Smoke Signals, which was nominated for the Grand Jury Prize at the Sundance Film Festival. He took a small role in Disney's Mystery, Alaska in 1999 and in 2000 accepted a role in the thriller, The Last Stop. Beach appeared in Helen Lee's The Art of Woo and the 2001 hit Joe Dirt as Kickin' Wing, a Native American fireworks salesman. The producers of Joe Dirt had originally wanted to hire Evan Adams for the parody of his character in Smoke Signals, but accidentally called Beach instead.

In 2002, Windtalkers, starring Beach, was released in theatres; it was about Navajo codetalkers working with the US Marines during World War II. To prepare for this role, Beach spent six months learning the Navajo language. He used this language in his next project, Skinwalkers, based on a novel by Tony Hillerman and directed by Chris Eyre, who had given him his break-out role in Smoke Signals. Between large-scale projects, Beach made small television appearances on such shows as JAG and Third Watch. Also, in 2003, he returned to the character that he first portrayed in Skinwalkers in the movie Coyote Waits, also based on a Hillerman novel. He also made a guest appearance in the hit show The Dead Zone as a Native shaman (in the episode "Shaman").

In 2006, Beach portrayed Ira Hayes in Clint Eastwood's feature film Flags of Our Fathers. During the filming of this movie, both Beach's grandmother and his best friend died. Beach commented, "And if you add those up, there's a lot of emotion. When you're doing a movie, when you let go emotionally, there's nothing to grab onto," he said about the deaths. About playing the part, Beach said, "For me, playing Ira was a meaningful relationship. I would call it – trying to find out how he was, or how he thought and felt". The movie won two Academy Award nominations and Beach was nominated for multiple Best Supporting Actor honours.

In 2006, Beach ran as a candidate to lead his Lake Manitoba First Nation; he was not successful but said he will try again. In 2007, Beach starred in HBO Films' adaptation of Dee Brown's history, Bury My Heart at Wounded Knee. In the film, Beach portrays Charles Eastman (Dakota name Ohiyesa), a doctor, Sioux advocate and author. He explores and expresses the changing understanding of Aboriginal-US relations during the period leading up to the Wounded Knee Massacre.

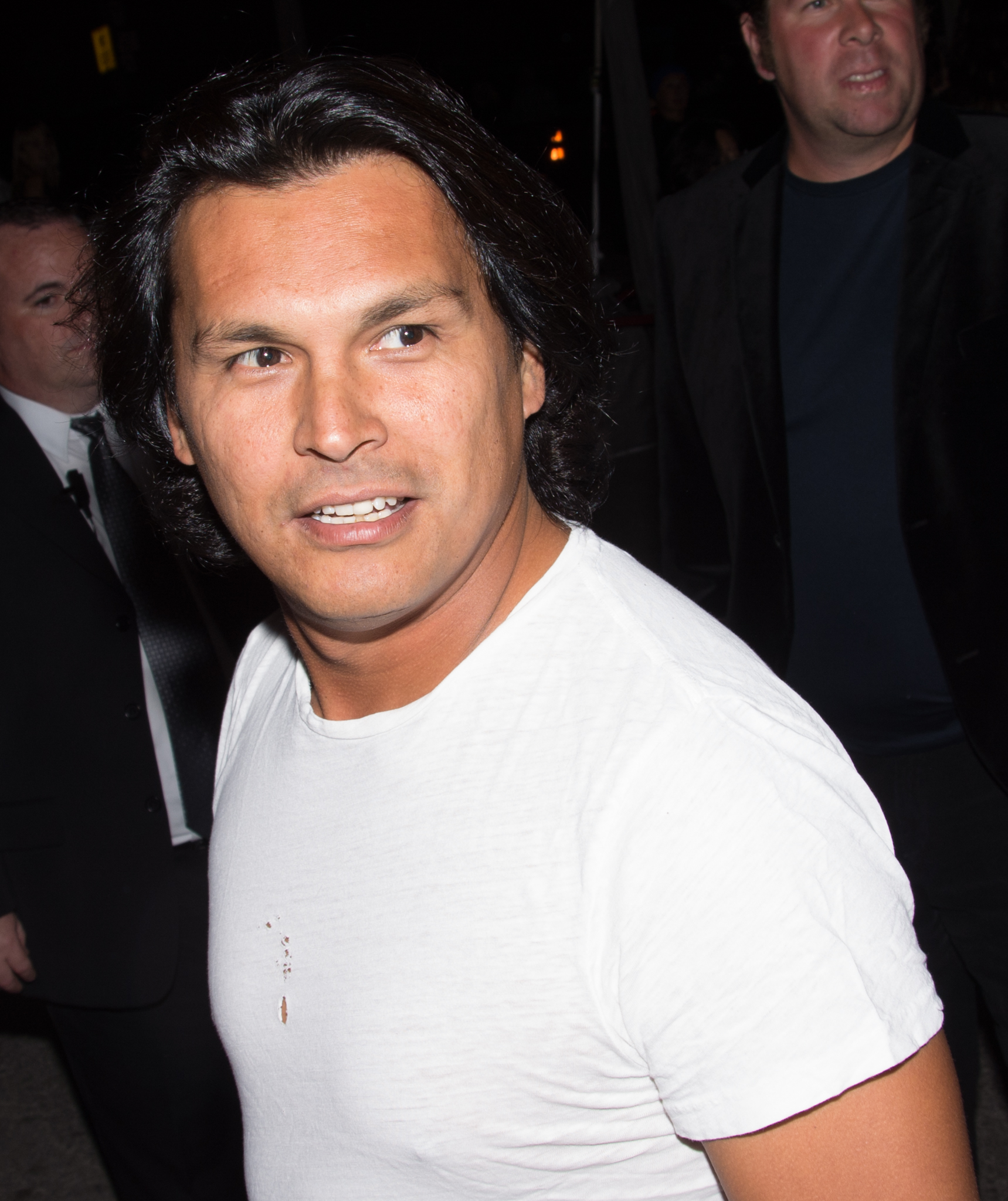
Beach at the 2014 Toronto International Film Festival

In addition to starring in the Canadian television series Moose TV, Beach is executive-producing and starring in the movie Older Than America. The independent feature is filmed in Cloquet, Minnesota, mostly on the Fond du Lac Ojibwe reservation. He joined the cast of Law & Order: Special Victims Unit as Detective Chester Lake for the show's ninth season after guest-starring in season eight. In April 2008, TV Guide announced that he would not return for the show's tenth season. He later stated he grew disillusioned with the strictly procedural nature of the show and opted to leave after the finish of the ninth season.

Starting in 2009, Beach played a supporting role on the HBO series Big Love as a manager in an Indian casino with Bill Henrickson (Bill Paxton). On February 10, 2010, it was announced that Beach will portray Tommy Prince, the Canadian war hero, in an upcoming movie about his life. According to Bay Film Studios, the movie will be a "true account of Canada's most highly decorated First Nations soldier." Beach said he is honoured to portray Prince, calling him a positive role model for all First Nations. In 2011, he starred in Cowboys & Aliens, an American science fiction Western film directed by Jon Favreau and starring Daniel Craig, Harrison Ford and Olivia Wilde. The film is based on the 2006 graphic novel of the same name created by Scott Mitchell Rosenberg. Also in 2011, Beach returned to Canada to star in the TV series Arctic Air, which premiered on January 12, 2012. In 2015, Beach appeared on several episodes of Backstrom as Sheriff Jesse Rocha. In 2017, he played Black Hawk in Hostiles, starring Christian Bale, Rosamund Pike and Wes Studi.

In 2022 Beach was selected as host of the Canadian chainsaw carving competition show A Cut Above.

== Personal life ==
Adam Beach has been married three times and has three children. He has two sons with his first wife, Meredith Porter (married 1999–2002). He did not have children with his second wife, Tara Mason (married 2003–2007). In 2008, his current wife, Summer Tiger, gave birth to a daughter.

== Awards and nominations ==
| Year | Award | Category | Work | Result |
|---|---|---|---|---|
| 1995 | American Indian Film Festival | Best Actor | Dance Me Outside | Won |
| 1995 | First American in the Arts Awards | Best Actor | My Indian Summer | Won |
| 1998 | San Diego World Film Festival | Best Actor | Smoke Signals | Won |
| 2006 | Broadcast Film Critics Association | Best Supporting Actor | Flags of Our Fathers | Nominated |
| 2006 | Satellite Awards | Best Supporting Actor | Flags of Our Fathers | Nominated |
| 2007 | American Indian Film Festival | Best Actor | Luna: Spirit of the Whale | Nominated |
| 2008 | Golden Globe Award | Best Actor — Mini-Series or Television Film | Bury My Heart at Wounded Knee | Nominated |
| 2008 | Image Awards | Outstanding Actor | Bury My Heart at Wounded Knee | Nominated |
| 2012 | Indspire Awards | Arts | Himself | Won |
| 2015 | Canadian Screen Awards | Best Performance by an Actor in a Continuing Leading Dramatic Role | Arctic Air | Nominated |

== Filmography ==
=== Films ===
| Year | Title | Role | Tribe | Notes |
|---|---|---|---|---|
| 1993 | Cadillac Girls | Will | | |
| 1994 | Squanto: A Warrior's Tale | Squanto | Patuxet | |
| 1994 | A Boy Called Hate | Billy Little Plume | | |
| 1995 | Dance Me Outside | Frank Fencepost | Ojibwe (related to Beach's actual Saulteaux heritage) | |
| 1996 | Coyote Summer | Rafe Acuna | | |
| 1997 | Song of Hiawatha | Chibiabos | Ojibwe (related to Beach's actual Saulteaux heritage) | |
| 1998 | Smoke Signals | Victor Joseph | Coeur d'Alene | |
| 1999 | Mystery, Alaska | Galin Winetka | | |
| 2000 | The Last Stop | Jason | | |
| 2001 | Joe Dirt | Kickin' Wing | | |
| 2001 | Now & Forever | John Myron | Cree | |
| 2001 | The Art of Woo | Ben Crowchild | | |
| 2002 | Windtalkers | Private Ben Yazzie | Navajo | |
| 2002 | Posers | Sinclair | | |
| 2003 | Cowboys and Indians: The J.J. Harper Story | John Joseph Harper | Oji-Cree | |
| 2003 | The Big Empty | Randy | | |
| 2004 | Sawtooth | Jim | | |
| 2005 | Four Brothers | Chief | | Uncredited |
| 2006 | Flags of Our Fathers | Ira Hayes | Pima | |
| 2007 | Luna: Spirit of the Whale | Mike Maquinna | Mowachaht-Muchalaht | |
| 2008 | Turok: Son of Stone | Turok | | Voice role |
| 2008 | Older than America | Johnny | Ojibwe | |
| 2008 | Help | Max | | |
| 2010 | The Stranger | Mason | | |
| 2010 | The Stepson | Josh Anderson | | Main role |
| 2011 | A Warrior's Heart | Sgt. Major Duke Wayne | | |
| 2011 | Cowboys & Aliens | Nat Colorado | | Supporting role |
| 2011 | Tommy Prince: Prince of the Devils | Tommy Prince | | |
| 2013 | Crook | Bryce | | |
| 2013 | Ice Soldiers | TC Cardinal | | |
| 2013 | Into the Grizzly Maze | Johnny Cadillac | | |
| 2014 | A Fighting Man | Fast Eddie | | |
| 2015 | Joe Dirt 2: Beautiful Loser | Kickin' Wing | | Cameo |
| 2015 | Diablo | Nakoma | | |
| 2016 | Suicide Squad | Christopher Weiss / Slipknot | | |
| 2017 | Juliana & the Medicine Fish | Mike Reid | | |
| 2017 | Hostiles | Black Hawk | Cheyenne | |
| 2019 | Juanita | Jess | | |
| 2020 | Monkey Beach | Uncle Mick | | |
| 2020 | The New Mutants | William Lonestar | Cheyenne | |
| 2020 | Percy | Alton Kelly | | |
| 2021 | The Unhealer | Sheriff Adler | | |
| 2021 | The Power of the Dog | Edward Nappo | | |
| 2021 | Swan Song | Dalton | | |
| 2022 | Exile | Ted Evans | | |
| 2022 | American/Indian | Carl | | Pre-production |
| 2023 | Hey, Viktor! | Adam | | |
| 2024 | The Birds Who Fear Death | Adam | | |
| TBA | Terra Infirma | Max Windrunner | | Pre-production |
| TBA | Coyote Howls | James Hunter | | Pre-production |
| TBA | Hitman | The Hitman | | Pre-production |

=== Television ===
| Year | Title | Role | Tribe | Notes |
|---|---|---|---|---|
| 1990 | Lost in the Barrens | Hunting Party Member | | Television film |
| 1993 | Spirit Rider | Paul LeBlanc | | Television film |
| 1993–1995 | North of 60 | Nevada | | 4 episodes |
| 1995 | Walker, Texas Ranger | Tommy Bright Hawk | | Episode: "On Sacred Ground" |
| 1995 | CBS Schoolbreak Special | Ben | | Episode: "My Indian Summer" |
| 1996 | Lonesome Dove: The Outlaw Years | Red Crow | Lakota | Episode: "Medicine" |
| 1996 | Touched by an Angel | Dillon New Eagle | | Episode: "Written in Dust" |
| 1996 | The Rez | Charlie | Ojibwe | |
| 1997 | Dead Man's Gun | Tom | Nez Perce | Episode: "Medicine Man" |
| 2001 | Higher Ground | Aaron Reifel | | Episode: "What Remains" |
| 2002 | Skinwalkers | Officer Jim Chee | Navajo | Television film |
| 2002 | Bliss | Angel | | Episode: "Valentine's Day in Jail" |
| 2002 | The Dead Zone | Shaman | | Episode: "Shaman" |
| 2003 | Coyote Waits | Officer Jim Chee | Navajo | Television film |
| 2003 | Everwood | Mr. Grey Cloud | | Episode: "Unhappy Holidays" |
| 2003 | Third Watch | Christian | | 2 episodes |
| 2004 | A Thief of Time | Officer Jim Chee | Navajo | Television film |
| 2004 | JAG | Marcus Tillco | | Episode: "Whole New Ball Game" |
| 2005 | Johnny Tootall | Johnny Tootall | Nuu-chah-nulth | Television film |
| 2007 | Moose TV | George Keeshig | Cree | 8 episodes |
| 2007 | Bury My Heart at Wounded Knee | Charles Eastman (Ohiyesa) | Sioux | Television film |
| 2007–2008 | Law & Order: Special Victims Unit | Det. Chester Lake | Mohawk | Main role, 21 episodes |
| 2008 | Comanche Moon | Blue Duck | Comanche | 3 episodes |
| 2008 | Wapos Bay | Himself | | Voice role |
| 2010 | Big Love | Tommy Flute | Blackfoot | 9 episodes |
| 2010 | Hawaii Five-0 | Navy Seal Graham | | Episode: "Ho'apono" |
| 2011 | Combat Hospital | Joe / Snake Eater | | 3 episodes |
| 2012–2014 | Arctic Air | Bobby Martin | | Main role, 35 episodes |
| 2013 | Hell on Wheels | Red Bear | Kiowa | Episode: "The Game" |
| 2015 | Backstrom | Cooch County Captain Jesse Rocha | | 3 episodes |
| 2017 | Monsters of God | Sees Two Moons | | Television film |
| 2019 | Drunk History | Richard Oakes | | Episode: "National Parks" |
| 2019 | Supernatural | Sheriff Mason | | Episode: "Don't Go in the Woods" |
| 2019–2020 | Nancy Drew | Chief E.O. McGinnis | | 7 episodes |
| 2020 | The Good Doctor | Billy Carr | | Season 4 episode 4: "Not the Same" |
| 2022 | A Cut Above | Host | | |
| 2023 | Found | Kai Wagon | | Season 1 episode 7: "Missing While Indigenous" |
| 2025 | Government Cheese | Rudy | | Guest role |
| TBA | Avatar: The Last Airbender | Chief Hakoda | | |

== See also ==
- Notable Aboriginal people of Canada
