= Aberdeen (2024 film) =

- Directed by: Ryan Cooper; Eva Thomas
- Screenplay by: Ryan Cooper; Eva Thomas
- Produced by: Ryan Cooper; Kathleen Easton; Kyle Bornais
- Starring: Gail Maurice; Billy Merasty; Jennifer Podemski; Ryan Rajendra Black
- Cinematography: Jesse Wicklund
- Edited by: Sara Bulloch; Nathalie Massaroni
- Music by: Justin Delorme
- Production companies: Farpoint Films; Back to Space Productions
- Distributed by: Farpoint Distribution
- Release date: September 8, 2024 (TIFF)
- Running time: 83 minutes
- Country: Canada
- Language: English

Aberdeen is a Canadian drama film directed by Ryan Cooper and Eva Thomas, and released in 2024. The film stars Gail Maurice as the titular Aberdeen, an Indigenous Canadian woman who moves to Winnipeg after being forced to leave her home community as a climate refugee.

The cast also includes Billy Merasty, Jennifer Podemski, Liam Stewart-Kanigan and Ryan Rajendra Black.

The film premiered in the Discovery program at the 2024 Toronto International Film Festival. It later screened in the Borsos Competition program at the 2024 Whistler Film Festival.
