= Shoeless Joe (novel) =

1982 novel by W. P. Kinsella

- First edition
- Author: W. P. Kinsella
- Language: English
- Genre: Fabulism
- Publisher: Houghton Mifflin
- Publication date: 1982
- Publication place: Canada
- Media type: Print (hardcover, paperback, e-book)
- Pages: 265 (paperback edition)
- ISBN: 0-395-32047-X
- OCLC: 7947139
- Dewey Decimal: 813/.54 19
- LC Class: PR9199.3.K443 S49 1982

Shoeless Joe is a 1982 fabulist novel by Canadian author W. P. Kinsella that was later adapted into the 1989 film Field of Dreams, which was nominated for three Academy Awards.

The novel was expanded from Kinsella's short story "Shoeless Joe Jackson Comes to Iowa", first published in his 1980 collection of the same name. Kinsella first developed the idea for the story while attending the Iowa Writers' Workshop, and decided to incorporate the stories he told about the Black Sox Scandal, imagining if Shoeless Joe Jackson came back to the same city Kinsella was living in, Iowa City.

== Plot ==
Ray Kinsella lives and farms in Iowa, where he grows corn with his wife, Annie, and their five-year-old daughter, Karin. Kinsella is obsessed with the beauty and history of American baseball, specifically the plight of his hero, Shoeless Joe Jackson, and the Black Sox Scandal of the 1919 World Series.

When he hears a voice telling him to build a baseball field in the midst of his corn crop in order to give his hero a chance at redemption, he blindly follows instructions. The field becomes a conduit to the spirits of baseball legends.

Soon, Kinsella is off on a cross-country trip to ease the pain of another hero, the reclusive writer J. D. Salinger, as part of a journey The Philadelphia Inquirer called "not so much about baseball as it's about dreams, magic, life, and what is quintessentially American."

== Characters ==
=== Main ===
- Ray Kinsella, protagonist and devoted baseball fan
- Annie Kinsella, wife of Ray
- Karin Kinsella, 5-year-old daughter of Ray and Annie

=== Supporting ===
- Richard Kinsella, Identical twin brother of Ray
- "Gypsy", Richard's girlfriend
- Mark, Annie's brother and Ray's brother-in-law
- Abner Bluestein, Mark's business partner and accomplice
- Eddie Scissons, originally owned Ray's farm and was locally known as the oldest living Chicago Cub

=== Historical/real life ===
- Shoeless Joe Jackson, baseball player
- J. D. Salinger, reclusive author of The Catcher in the Rye and "A Young Girl in 1941 with No Waist at All", which are referred to in the book
- Moonlight Graham, baseball player and later a doctor in the small town of Chisholm, Minnesota

== Awards and nominations ==
Shoeless Joe was the winner of the 1982 Books in Canada First Novel Award and a Houghton Mifflin Literary Fellowship. In 2011, the Canadian Baseball Hall of Fame awarded Kinsella the Jack Graney Award for a significant contribution to the game of baseball in Canada through a life's work or a singular outstanding achievement.

== Film adaptation ==
Shoeless Joe was later adapted into the 1989 film Field of Dreams by Phil Alden Robinson. The original working title of the film was Shoeless Joe, like the book. The original title of the book was Dream Field, but the publisher renamed it Shoeless Joe.

== J. D. Salinger ==
W. P. Kinsella, who had never met Salinger, created a wholly imagined character (aside from his being a recluse) based on the author of The Catcher in the Rye, a book that had great meaning to him when he was a young man. To get a feel for Salinger, he re-read his body of work. "I made sure to make him a nice character so that he couldn't sue me."

In addition to having a character named "Ray Kinsella" in the short story "A Young Girl in 1941 with No Waist at All", Salinger had also used the surname in The Catcher in the Rye (Holden Caulfield's friend Richard Kinsella). Additionally, Salinger's mother, Marie Jillich, was born in Atlantic, Iowa, about one-hundred miles in distance from the Dyersville, Iowa, setting of the motion picture version of the novel.

Known for his litigiousness, Salinger contacted Kinsella's publisher via his attorneys to express outrage over having been portrayed in Shoeless Joe and intimated he would sue should the character "J. D. Salinger" appear in any other medium, should Shoeless Joe be adapted.

In the novel Shoeless Joe, Ray Kinsella seeks out J. D. Salinger, although in the film this character was renamed Terence Mann (and was changed to a black man by the casting of James Earl Jones) as the movie producers were worried over being sued by Salinger. The producers believed that it was not significant to jettison Salinger, as they figured only 15% of the potential audience would know who the author was. Kinsella told Maclean's Magazine in a 2010 interview on the death of Salinger that many of the book's readers believe that Salinger is a wholly fictional character.

Kinsella denied that Salinger, as a writer, had any particular influence on his own writing.

== Release details ==
- 1982, United States, Houghton Mifflin ISBN 0-395-32047-X, Pub. date April 12, 1982, (Paperback)
- 1999, United States, Mariner Books ISBN 0-395-95773-7, Pub. date April 28, 1999, Paperback
