= Ryan Rajendra Black =

Canadian actor

Ryan Rajendra Black (born June 10, 1973, in Winnipeg, Manitoba) is a Canadian actor, most noted for his leading role as Silas Crow in the 1994 film Dance Me Outside and its spinoff television series The Rez.

== Career ==
A Saulteaux member of the Sagkeeng First Nation, he has also appeared in the television series North of 60, Highlander: The Raven, Moccasin Flats and Cashing In, the films Cowboys and Indians: The J.J. Harper Story, Elimination Dance, Seven Times Lucky and Stryker, and on stage in a production of Ian Ross's Governor General's Award winning theatrical play fareWel.

He received a Gemini Award nomination for Best Actor in a Drama Series at the 13th Gemini Awards in 1998.

Black was a production coordinator for I, Hostage and I, Alive. He was also the second assistant director for 26 episodes of the 2019 reality series My Misdiagnosis.

== Filmography ==
=== Film ===
Year	Title	Role	Notes
1994	Dance Me Outside	Silas Crow	
2004	Seven Times Lucky	Five Wounds "Nephew"	
2004	Stryker	Omar	
2024	Aberdeen	Boyd	

=== Television ===
Year	Title	Role	Notes
1993	Geronimo	Goyahkla	Television film
1995	North of 60	Lawrence Poor Man	Episode: "The Visit"
1996–1997	The Rez	Silas Crow	Main cast
1997	The Adventures of Shirley Holmes	Keith Jackson	Episode: "The Case of the Cunning Coyote"
1998	Highlander: The Raven	Johnny	Episode: "Full Disclosure"
2000	Traders	Ryan	Episode: "The One You Bury"
2000	The Thin Blue Lie	Alberto	Television film
2001	Relic Hunter	Adam Grant	Episode: "Eyes of Toklamanee"
2002	Random Passage	Toma	2 episodes
2002	Framed	Technician	Television film
2003	Cowboys and Indians: The J.J. Harper Story	Judge Sinclair	Television film
2004	Wonderfalls	Bill Hooton	Episode: "Totem Mole"
2005	Moccasin Flats	Devlin Day	8 episodes
2007	Eye of the Beast	Will Neepanak	Television film
2014	Cashing In	Dino	Episode: "The Road Home"
