= W. P. Kinsella =

Canadian author (1935–2016)

W. P. Kinsella OC OBC
- Born: William Patrick Kinsella; May 25, 1935; Edmonton, Alberta, Canada
- Died: September 16, 2016 (aged 81); Hope, British Columbia, Canada
- Education: University of Victoria (BA); University of Iowa (MFA)
- Occupation: Author
- Writing career
- Genre: Sports fiction
- Subjects: Baseball, First Nations
- Notable awards: Officer of the Order of Canada; Stephen Leacock Award; Order of British Columbia

William Patrick Kinsella OC OBC (May 25, 1935 – September 16, 2016) was a Canadian novelist and short story writer, known for his novel Shoeless Joe (1982), which was adapted into the movie Field of Dreams in 1989. His work often concerned baseball, First Nations people, and Canadian culture.

== Early life ==
William Patrick Kinsella was born in Edmonton, Alberta, the son of Irish Canadian parents, Olive Mary (née Elliott/Elliot), a printer, and John Matthew Kinsella, a contractor. He was raised until he was 10 years old at a homestead near Darwell, Alberta, 60 kilometres (37 mi) west of the city, home-schooled by his mother and taking correspondence courses. "I'm one of these people who woke up at age five knowing how to read and write," he says.

When he was ten years old, the family moved to Edmonton. He did not go to school until grade five, attended Parkdale School for junior high, and did not attend university until he was in his mid-30s. Kinsella was barely exposed to literature in school, saying in a 2010 interview, "One Shakespeare play and one J. M. Barrie play was the total literature of my high school years."

Kinsella's literary education in his formative years came from reading and by attending all the plays at high school and any theatrical productions that made it to Edmonton. He also worked in the school library his senior year.

As an adult, he held a variety of jobs in Edmonton, including as a clerk for the government of Alberta and managing a credit bureau. In 1967, he moved to Victoria, British Columbia, running a pizza restaurant called Caesar's Italian Village and driving a taxi.

Although he had been writing since he was a child (winning a YMCA contest at age 14), he began taking writing courses at the University of Victoria in 1970, receiving a Bachelor of Arts in creative writing there in 1974. He earned a Master of Fine Arts in English at the Iowa Writers' Workshop at the University of Iowa in 1978. Before becoming a professional author, he was a professor of English at the University of Calgary.

== Literary life ==
According to the Canadian Encyclopedia, Kinsella's literary output primarily consists of two cycles of work dealing with two fictional universes: those dealing with baseball and those depicting the indigenous people of Canada. His first published book was Dance Me Outside (1977), a collection of 17 short stories narrated by a young Cree, Silas Ermineskin, who describes life on a First Nations reserve in Kinsella's native Alberta.

A later collection of similar stories, The Fencepost Chronicles, earned Kinsella the Stephen Leacock Memorial Medal for Humour. Kinsella was criticized for writing from the point of view of Native people, with Ojibwe author Lenore Keeshig-Tobias writing in 1990, "W. P. Kinsella's Hobbema stories may be insulting. But the real problem is that they amount to culture theft, the theft of voice." Kinsella said after a heated public exchange with Rudy Wiebe on the topic, "Fiction writers can write about anything they damn well please," and that he considered the term "cultural appropriation" the nonsense of Eastern Canadian academics. He also considered that much of the humor focused on white bureaucrats on reservations: "The way that oppressed people survive is by making fun of the people who oppress them. That is essentially what my Indian stories are all about."

Kinsella also wrote nearly 40 short stories and three novels about baseball. Shoeless Joe (1982), his first novel, blends fantasy and magic realism to tell the story of a poor Iowa farmer who, yielding to voices in his head, builds a baseball field in his cornfield that attracts the spirits of the 1919 Chicago White Sox. The Iowa Baseball Confederacy (1986), another book blending fantasy and magical realism, recounts an epic baseball game a minor league team played against the 1908 World Champion Chicago Cubs. Box Socials (1991), an evocation of life in rural Alberta during the Great Depression and World War II, has a growing boy as its narrator and recounts a local batting hero's hopes of facing a visiting major league pitcher 60 miles away in Edmonton. The Canadian Baseball Hall of Fame awarded him the Jack Graney Award in 2011 for a significant contribution to the game of baseball in Canada.

Shoeless Joe remains Kinsella's most famous work. The book was mildly controversial for using a living person, the reclusive author J. D. Salinger, as a main character. Kinsella, who had never met him, created a wholly imagined character (aside from his reclusiveness) based on The Catcher in the Rye, a book that had great meaning to him as a young man. To get a feel for Salinger, he reread his body of work but created an imaginary version of the author. "I made sure to make him a nice character so that he couldn't sue me."

In an example of metafiction, he named Shoeless Joe's protagonist Ray Kinsella, a character from Salinger's uncollected story "A Young Girl in 1941 with No Waist at All". Salinger also used the surname Kinsella in The Catcher in the Rye (Holden Caulfield's friend Richard Kinsella, who also shared a name with Ray Kinsella's twin brother in Shoeless Joe).

Known for his litigiousness, Salinger contacted Kinsella's publisher via his attorneys to express outrage over having been portrayed in Shoeless Joe. Kinsella denied that Salinger, as a writer, had any real influence on his own writing, despite rumors to the contrary (some said that Kinsella had actually met Salinger).

Shoeless Joe won Kinsella the prestigious Houghton Mifflin Literary Fellowship and the Books in Canada First Novel Award in 1982. The book garnered good reviews, sold very well, and was made into a movie, Field of Dreams.

== Adaptations ==
W. P. Kinsella's novel Shoeless Joe was made into the movie Field of Dreams, starring Kevin Costner. The movie grossed nearly $65 million in the United States. It helped establish Costner as a star and was later inducted into the National Film Registry.

Kinsella's eight books of short stories about life on reserves were the basis for the 1994 movie Dance Me Outside and CBC television series The Rez, both of which Kinsella considered to be of very poor quality. Fencepost Chronicles won the Stephen Leacock Award for Humour in 1987. The short story The Last Pennant Before Armageddon was adapted for the stage by the City Lit Theater in Chicago in 1990.

Kinsella's short story "Lieberman in Love" was the basis for a short film that won the Academy Award for Live Action Short Film in 1996. The Oscar came as a surprise to Kinsella, who, watching the award telecast from home, had no idea the film had been made and released. He was not listed in the film's credits or acknowledged by director Christine Lahti in her acceptance speech. A full-page advertisement ran in Variety apologizing to Kinsella for the error.

== Career interruption ==
In 1997 Kinsella was involved in a car accident that almost ended his writing career. He was struck by a car while walking and suffered a head injury when he hit the ground. He did not publish another novel for 14 years.

In a 1999 interview with the University of Regina's student newspaper, Kinsella explained that he could no longer write as he had lost his ability to concentrate. The injury also robbed him of his senses of taste and smell. Kinsella said he went from being a Type A personality to Type B. After the accident, he didn't feel like doing the things he had done in his former routine and didn't care. He did write book reviews to keep his name before the public.

Kinsella also felt that he was a victim of changes in the book industry during this period, saying in a 2010 interview with Maclean's Magazine, "I couldn't break into the market today if I was just starting out. The publishing industry is down to a few dozen mainly adventure and romance writers. There's still some academic fiction out there, but it has an incredibly small audience. Nobody really cares about it."

== Later years ==
On September 1, 2011, Winnipeg, Manitoba's Enfield and Wizenty, a small press specializing in limited-edition hardcover books, released Kinsella's first published work in 13 years, Butterfly Winter. The unpublished manuscript had won the publisher's Colophon Prize the preceding March. The release was backed up by a "modest" book tour, according to the publisher.

The story of Julio and Esteban Pimental, twins whose divine destiny for baseball begins with games of catch in the womb, marks a return to form, combining Kinsella's long-held passions of baseball and magical realism. The University of Toronto Press released a trade hardcover edition on October 1. A short story of Kinsella's by the same title was included in his 1988 collection Red Wolf, Red Wolf, published by Totem Press (Collins Publishers).

A noted tournament Scrabble player, Kinsella became more involved with the game after being disillusioned by the 1994 Major League Baseball strike. He spent his final years in Yale, British Columbia, with his fourth wife, Barbara, occasionally writing articles for various newspapers.

== Death ==
Kinsella suffered from diabetes for decades and chose to die with MAID on September 16, 2016, in Hope, British Columbia. He was survived by two daughters and several grandchildren.

== Honours ==
- In 1991, Kinsella received an honorary Doctor of Literature degree from the University of Victoria.
- In 1993, he was made an Officer of the Order of Canada.
- In 2005, he was named to the Order of British Columbia.
- In 2009, he was presented the George Woodcock Lifetime Achievement Award. Vancouver Public Library and Pacific Book World News Society jointly sponsor and present the annual prize to a British Columbia author for an enduring contribution to the literary arts. "I think a lifetime achievement award sounds pretty final, but I'm always happy to see my work recognized," Kinsella said.

== Works ==
=== Novels ===
- Shoeless Joe (1982, winner of the 1983 Books in Canada First Novel Award and the Houghton Mifflin Literary Fellowship)
- The Iowa Baseball Confederacy (1986)
- Box Socials (1991)
- The Winter Helen Dropped By (1994)
- If Wishes Were Horses (1996)
- Magic Time (1998)
- Butterfly Winter (2011)

=== Short story collections ===
- Dance Me Outside, (1977, short stories). Stories included: Illiana comes home – Dance me outside – Horse collars – Panache – Butterflies – The McGuffin – Caraway – Linda Star – The kid in the stove – Ups and downs – Penance – The inaugural meeting – Lark song – Feathers – Between – Longhouse – Gooch.
- Scars, (1978, short stories). Stories included: Mr. Whitey – Bones – John cat – Manitou motors – Goose moon – The four-sky thunder bundle – Scars.
- Shoeless Joe Jackson Comes To Iowa, (1980, short stories). Stories included: Fiona the first – A quite incredible dance – Shoeless Joe Jackson comes to Iowa – Waiting for the call – Sister Ann of the cornfields – The Grecian urn – Mankiewitz won't be bowling Tuesday nights anymore – A picture of the virgin – The blacksmith shop caper – First names and empty pockets.
- Born Indian, (1981, short stories). Some of the stories in this collection are: Born Indian, Indian Struck, The Sister, and Jokemaker. This is an incomplete list.
  - This in German: Spaßvogel. transl. Klaus Schultz, in: Erkundungen. Verlag Volk und Welt, Berlin 1986
- The Moccasin Telegraph, (1983, short stories). Stories included: The bottle queen – Strings – The moccasin telegraph – Green candles – Parts of the eagle – The sense she was born with – The ballad of the public trustee – Where the wild things are – Dr. Don – The college – Nests – Vows – The queen's hat – The mother's dance – Pius Blindman is coming home – Fugitives.
- The Thrill of the Grass, (1984, short stories). Stories included: The Last Pennant Before Armageddon – The Baseball Spur – How I Got My Nickname – Bud and Tom – Nursie – The Night Manny Mota Tied the Record – Driving Toward the Moon – Barefoot and Pregnant in Des Moines – The Firefighter – The Battery – The Thrill of the Grass.
- Five Stories, (1985, short stories). Stories included: Frank Pierce, Iowa – Oh, Marley – Diehard – A Hundred Dollars Worth of Roses – Homer.
- The Alligator Report, (1985, short stories). Stories included: The post office octopus – The Vancouver Chapter of the Howard G. Scharff Memorial Society – Gabon – Syzygy – The secret – The silver porcupine – Books by the pound – The East End Umbrella Company Endowment for the Arts – A page from the marriage manual for Songhees brides – How I missed the million dollar round table – The job – The redemption center – Marco in paradise – Voyeur – King of the street – The resurrection of trout fishing in America shorty – The letter writer – Preserving fireweed for the White Pass and Yukon Railroad – Strawberry stew – Electrico utensilio – The book buyers – Doves and proverbs – I am airport – The gerbil that ate Los Angeles – The history of peanut butter – The alligator report.
- The Fencepost Chronicles, (1986, short stories, winner of the 1987 Stephen Leacock Memorial Medal for Humour). Stories included: Truth – The truck – Beef – The managers – The practical education of Constable B.B. Bobowski – To look at the Queen – The Indian nation cultural exchange program – The performance – The bear went over the mountain – Dancing – Real Indians – The fog – Indian Joe.
- Red Wolf, Red Wolf, (1987, short stories). Stories included: Red Wolf, Red Wolf – Something to Think About – Lieberman in Love – Driving Patterns – Elvis Bound – Oh, Marley – Truth and History – Evangeline's Mother – Billy in Trinidad – Apartheid – Butterfly Winter – For Zoltan, Who Sings – Mother Tucker's Yellow Duck.
- The Further Adventures of Slugger McBatt, (1988, short stories). Stories included: Distances – Reports Concerning the Death of the Seattle Albatross Are Somewhat Exaggerated – The Further Adventures of Slugger McBatt – Frank Pierce, Iowa – K Mart – The Valley of the Schmoon – Punchlines – The Eddie Scissons Syndrome – Diehard – Searching for Freddy.
- The Miss Hobbema Pageant, (1989, short stories). Stories included: Being invisible – Snitches – Pizza Ria – A lighter load – The Miss Hobbema pageant – Forgiveness among animals – Tricks – Graves – Coming home to roost – The sundog society – The election – Homer – A hundred dollars worth of roses – The medicine man's daughter.
- The Dixon Cornbelt League and Other Baseball Stories, (1993, short stories). Stories included: The Baseball Wolf – The Fadeaway – The Darkness Deep Inside – Eggs – How Manny Embarquadero Overcame and Began His Climb to the Major Leagues – Searching for January – Feet of Clay – Lumpy Drobot, Designated Hitter – The Dixon Cornbelt League.
- Brother Frank's Gospel Hour, (1994, short stories). Stories included: Bull – Miracle on Manitoba Street – The elevator – Ice man – Turbulence – Saskatoon search – The rain birds – George the cat – Conflicting statements – Dream catcher – Brother Frank's gospel hour.
- The Secret of the Northern Lights, (1998, short stories). Stories included: Bleaching the Buffalo – The Auction – The Lightning Birds – Dangerous Consequences – Hide and Seek – The Porcupine Man – Practical People – Threes – The Legend – Fun and Games – Mother's Day – The Secret of the Northern Lights.
- Baseball Fantastic, (2000, short stories). Stories included: Fred Noonan Flying Services – The Indestructible Hadrian Wilks. (This is a collection edited by Kinsella that includes stories by other authors.)
- Japanese Baseball and Other Stories, (2000, short stories). Stories included: The Kowloon Cafe – Tulips – The Mansions of Federico Juarez – Japanese Baseball – The Indestructible Hadrian Wilks – The First and Last Annual Six Towns Area Old-Timers' Game – The Lime Tree – The Arbiter – Fred Noonan Flying Services – Wavelengths – Underestimating Lynn Johanssen.
- The Essential W. P. Kinsella, (2015, short stories). Stories included: Truth – How I got my nickname –The night Manny Mota tied the record – First names and empty pockets – Searching for January – Lieberman in love – The Grecian urn – The fog – Beef – Distances – How Manny Embarquadero overcame and began his climb to the major leagues – The Indian Nation Cultrural Exchange Program – K Mart – The firefighter – Dr. Don – Brother Frank's Gospel Hour – The Alligator Report–with questions for discussion – King of the street – Wavelengths – Do not abandon me – Marco in Paradise – Out of the picture – The lightning birds – Punchlines – The last surviving member of the Japanese Victory Society – The job – The risk takers – The lime tree – Doves and proverbs – Waiting on Lombard Street – Shoeless Joe Jackson comes to Iowa.

=== Poetry ===
- Rainbow Warehouse, (1989, poetry)
