= Jennifer Podemski =

First Nations actress from Canada

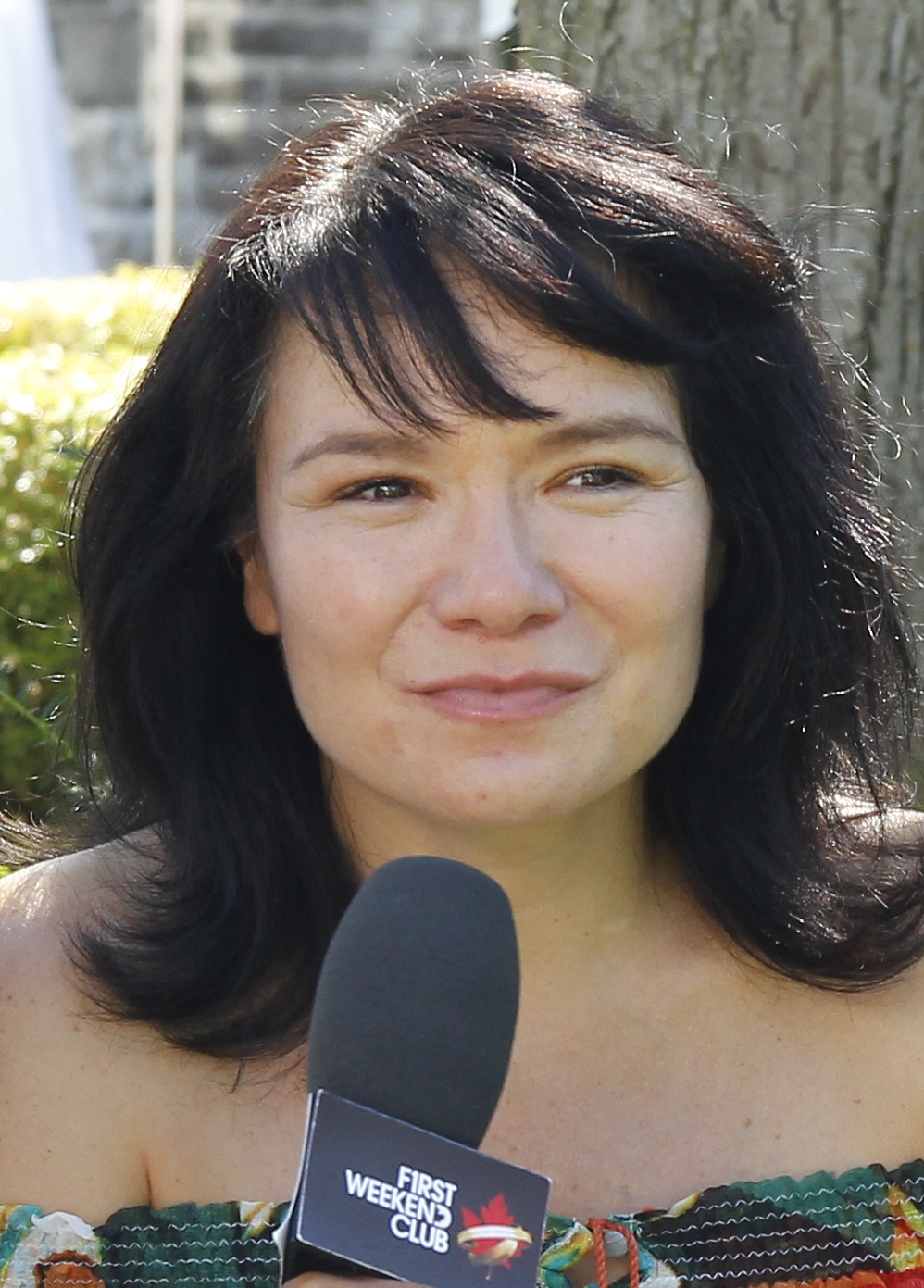
- Podemski in 2014
- Born: May 3, 1973 (age 53); Toronto, Ontario, Canada
- Citizenship: Canada
- Occupations: Actress; producer; writer; director
- Years active: 1991–present
- Relatives: Tamara Podemski (sister); Sarah Podemski (sister); Michael Podemski-Bedard (son)

Jennifer Podemski (born May 3, 1973) is a Canadian film and television actress and producer.

Her acting credits include starring roles in the television series Tin Star, The Rez, Riverdale, Moccasin Flats, Bliss, and Moose TV, and the films Dance Me Outside, The Diviners, and Empire of Dirt, as well as supporting or guest roles in Degrassi, Republic of Doyle, The Eleventh Hour, Blue Murder, Wild Card, This Is Wonderland, Rabbit Fall, The Border, and Maniac Mansion. Her production credits include Rabbit Fall, Moccasin Flats, and Empire of Dirt.

== Early life ==
Podemski was born and raised in Toronto, Ontario. Her father is Jewish and her mother belongs to the Muscowpetung First Nation and is of Saulteaux, Ojibwe, Lenape, and Métis descent. Her paternal grandparents were from Poland, and moved to Canada after WWII. Her sisters, Tamara Podemski and Sarah Podemski are also actors. All three sisters appear together in the FX series Reservation Dogs.

== Career ==
Podemski's acting credits include starring roles in the television series Tin Star, The Rez, Riverdale, Moccasin Flats, Bliss, and Moose TV, and the films Dance Me Outside, The Diviners, and Empire of Dirt, as well as supporting or guest roles in Degrassi, Republic of Doyle, The Eleventh Hour, Blue Murder, Wild Card, This Is Wonderland, Rabbit Fall, The Border, and Maniac Mansion. Her production credits include Rabbit Fall, Moccasin Flats, and Empire of Dirt.

She was a Gemini Award nominee for the Best Actress in a Drama Series at the 1997 Gemini Awards for The Rez and a Canadian Screen Award nominee for Best Supporting Actress at the 2nd Canadian Screen Awards, for Empire of Dirt.

In 2018, Podemski created the documentary series Future History for APTN.

In 2021, together with Derek Diorio, she created the television series Unsettled for APTN. She went on to produce the drama series Little Bird for Crave with Hannah Moscovitch.

In January 2023, she was named as a recipient of the Academy of Canadian Cinema and Television's Board of Directors Tribute Award at the 11th Canadian Screen Awards.

== Filmography ==
=== Film ===
Year	Title	Role	Notes
1994	Dance Me Outside	Sadie Maracle	
1996	Bogus	Circus character	
1996	Fish Tale Soup		
1996	Love Child	—N/a	Short film Costume assistant
1998	Short for Nothing	Hope	
1999	Don't Think Twice	Casey	Short film
2000	Blood River	Rose	Short film
2001	She	Tala	
2001	RepREZentin' in Kettle and Stoney Point	—N/a	Short film Executive producer
2002	Laurel		Short film Producer
2002	RepREZentin' in Fort Chip	—N/a	Short film Executive producer
2003	Bar Life	Chris	Short film
2007	Fugitive Pieces	Grace	
2008	Pavane	Kim	Short film
2010	Spare Change	—N/a	Short film Executive producer Co-cinematographer
2010	Crazytown	—N/a	Short film Producer
2011	Take This Waltz	Karen	
2013	Empire of Dirt	Minnie Mahikan	Producer
2013	Jimmy P: Psychotherapy of a Plains Indian	Doll	
2015	Fire Song	Jackie	
2015	Clouds of Autumn	—N/a	Short film Producer
2017	Reel Seen Women	Mom	Short film
2017	Just One Word	—N/a	Executive producer
2018	Mouthpiece	Mrs. Cappo	
2020	Akilla's Escape	Mrs. Rosenthal	
2021	The Death Doula	Doctor	Short film
2022	Rehab	Janet Cardinal	
2023	Mothers: Out of a Panedemic	—N/a	Short film
2023	Redlights	Tina's Mom	Short film
2023	Coming Home (Wanna Icipus Kupi)	—N/a	Documentary; Executive producer
2024	Aberdeen	Grace	
2024	The Light Before the Sun	Syd	Short film Executive producer
2025	Nika and Madison	Alicia Hall	

=== Television ===
Year	Title	Role	Notes
1991	Conspiracy of Silence	Cecilia	Mini-series; Episode 2
1993	The Diviners	Pique	TV movie
1993	Maniac Mansion	Kim	Season 3, episode 17: "Freddie Had a Little Lamb"
1996			
1996-1997	The Rez	Sadie Maracle	Main cast; 19 episodes
1997	...First Do No Harm	Hogelman Nurse	TV movie
1997-2000	Riverdale	Michelle Martin	Character was also played by actress Michelle Martin
1999	Animorphs	Samantha	Season 1, episode 16: "Tobias"
1999	Mind Prey	Gloria Crosby	TV movie
1999	Dear America: Standing in the Light	Bright Eyes	
2000	The Lost Child	Kate	TV movie
2000	The Seventh Generation	—N/a	Producer
2001	The Wandering Soul Murders	Kim Barilko	TV movie
2003	Blue Murder	Alice Tremblay	Season 3, episode 4: "John Doe"
2003	Bliss	Kate	
2003	Wild Card	Gallery owner	Also known as Zoey Busiek: Wild Card
2003-2006	Moccasin Flats	Deb Johnson	Main cast; 16 episodes Creator; Executive producer and producer; 15 episodes Writer; 4 episodes
2003-2010	Degrassi: The Next Generation	Ms. Chantel Sauvé	15 episodes
2004	This Is Wonderland	Beth Taylor	Season 1, episode 7
2004	The Eleventh Hour	Eleanor Martine	Aired in the United States as Bury the Lead; Season 2, episode 10: "I'll Build Me an Island"
2005	Distant Drumming: North of 60 Mystery	Marjory Sebastian	TV movie
2005	Sue Thomas: F.B.Eye	Rosie	Season 3, episode 18: "Bad Girls"
2005	Heritage Minutes	Beryl Prince	Season 9, episode 1: "Tommy Prince"
2007	The Robber Bride	Juanita	TV movie
2007	Moose TV	Alice Cheecho	Main cast; 8 episodes
2007-2008	Rabbit Fall	Hooded Figure / Sharon Mohn	3 episodes Producer; 14 episodes Writer; season 2, episode: "Berry Fast"
2008	The Border	Jo Montreux	Season 1, episode 2: "Gray Zone"
2009	National Aboriginal Achievement Awards	—N/a	Creative producer
2010	Arbor Live!	—N/a	Production supervisor; 12 episodes
2013	Republic of Doyle	Maria House	Season 5, episode 2: "The Overpass"
2014	Sensitive Skin	Angry Woman	Season 1, episode 4: "The Mummy"
2014	21st Annual Indspire Awards	—N/a	Producer
2014-2015	Blackstone	Dr. Louise Crowshoe	8 episodes
2014-2018	The Other Side	—N/a	Producer; 54 episodes
2015	22nd Annual Indspire Awards	—N/a	Producer
2016	23rd Annual Indspire Awards	—N/a	Executive producer
2017	24th Indspire Awards	—N/a	Executive producer
2017	Private Eyes	Colonel	
2017	This Hour Has 22 Minutes	Herself	Season 24, episode 22: "The 22 Minutes Canada 150 Special"
2017-2018	Hard Rock Medical	Bonnie	Regular; 14 episodes
2018	Forgive Me	Maria	2 episodes
2018-2019	Future History	—N/a	Director; Executive producer
2019	Cardinal	Wendy Duchene	4 episodes
2021	Unsettled	—N/a	Director; 10 episodes Writer; 10 episodes
2021-2023	Reservation Dogs	Willie Jack's Mom	3 episodes
2022	Indspire Awards 2022	—N/a	Director
2023	Indspire Awards 2023	—N/a	Director; Executive producer
2023	Little Bird	Mini-series; Creator; Executive producer / showrunner Executive story editor	
2023	Accused	Bailiff Sophie Taliman	Season 1, episode 6: "Naataanii's Story"
2024	Resident Alien	Rachel	2 episodes
2024	Don't Even	Shelly	6 episodes
2025	It: Welcome to Derry	Niko	Season 1, episode 4: "The Great Swirling Apparatus of Our Planet's Function"

=== Video games ===
Year	Title	Role	Notes
2004	Myst IV: Revelation	Anya	Credited as Jennifer Podemsky
2016	The Other Side: The Game	—N/a	Producer; Credited as Jennifer Podemsky

=== Music videos ===
Year	Title	Artist	Role	Notes
2003	"I'm a Lucky One"	Tru Rez Crew	—N/a	Producer
2003	"Music Is the Medicine"	Derek Miller	—N/a	Producer

== Personal ==
Her son, Michael Podemski-Bedard, is also an actor who appears in Deer Lady, an episode of Reservation Dogs. She is currently married to Doug Bedard.
