= Field of Dreams =

1989 film by Phil Alden Robinson

- Theatrical release poster by Mick McGinty
- Directed by: Phil Alden Robinson
- Screenplay by: Phil Alden Robinson
- Based on: Shoeless Joe by W.P. Kinsella
- Produced by: Lawrence Gordon; Charles Gordon
- Starring: Kevin Costner; Amy Madigan; James Earl Jones; Ray Liotta; Burt Lancaster
- Cinematography: John Lindley
- Edited by: Ian Crafford
- Music by: James Horner
- Production company: Gordon Company
- Distributed by: Universal Pictures (United States); Carolco Pictures (International)
- Release date: April 21, 1989 (United States)
- Running time: 106 minutes
- Country: United States
- Language: English
- Budget: $15 million
- Box office: $84.5 million

Field of Dreams is a 1989 American sports fantasy film written and directed by Phil Alden Robinson, and based on Canadian novelist W. P. Kinsella's 1982 novel Shoeless Joe. The film stars Kevin Costner as a farmer who builds a baseball field in his cornfield that attracts the ghosts of baseball legends, including Shoeless Joe Jackson (Ray Liotta) and the Chicago Black Sox. Amy Madigan, James Earl Jones, and Burt Lancaster (in his final film role before his death in 1994) also star.

The film was released on April 21, 1989, by Universal Pictures in the United States, with Carolco Pictures releasing in other territories. It received positive reviews from critics while grossing $84.5 million against a $15 million budget, and was nominated for three Academy Awards: Best Picture, Best Original Score, and Best Adapted Screenplay. In 2017, it was selected for preservation in the United States National Film Registry by the Library of Congress.

== Plot ==
Ray Kinsella, his wife Annie and daughter Karin live on their corn farm in Dyersville, Iowa. Troubled by his broken relationship with his deceased father John, a devoted baseball fan, Ray fears growing old without achieving his dreams.

While walking through his cornfield one evening, Ray hears a voice whispering, "If you build it, he will come"; then has a vision of a baseball diamond in the cornfield with the ghost of "Shoeless" Joe Jackson there. Annie agrees to convert part of their field into a baseball field, at risk of financial hardship.

As Ray builds the field, he tells Karin about the 1919 Black Sox Scandal. Time passes, and as Ray is beginning to doubt himself, Shoeless Joe appears one evening. After tossing a few balls around the field, Joe asks Ray if he can bring more players and he agrees. The next day, seven more Black Sox players come. Annie's brother Mark, who cannot see the players, warns them they are going bankrupt and offers to buy their land. The voice, meanwhile, urges Ray to "ease his pain."

The Kinsellas attend a PTA meeting, where Annie successfully prevents the ban of books by Terence Mann, a controversial author and activist from the 1960s. Ray deduces the voice was referring to Mann, who had named one of his characters "John Kinsella" and had once professed a childhood dream of playing for the Brooklyn Dodgers. That night, both Ray and Annie have identical dreams about him and Mann attending a game together at Fenway Park, so Ray drives to Boston to find him.

Mann, now a disenchanted recluse, agrees to attend one game. There, Ray hears the voice, urging him to "go the distance", while seeing statistics on the scoreboard for Archie "Moonlight" Graham, who played a single 1922 game for the New York Giants but never got to bat. As Ray and Mann are about to part ways, Mann confesses hearing the voice and seeing the scoreboard.

The pair drive to Chisholm, Minnesota, learning that Graham, who became a physician, had died years earlier. Ray's research uncovers his obituary, showing he was a beloved and charitable doctor, but leaves out baseball. Ray suddenly finds himself in 1972, meeting an elderly Graham, who feels his calling was medicine, not sports, and declines their invitation to the field.

Heading to Iowa, Ray and Mann pick up a young hitchhiker who is looking to join a baseball team. He introduces himself as Archie Graham. Ray reveals his father forced him to play baseball after his own baseball career failed. At 14, after reading one of Mann's books, he stopped playing with him. They became estranged after he mocked John, saying "[he] could never respect a man whose hero [Joe] was a criminal."

Ray's greatest regret is not reconciling with his father before he died. Mann and Ray agree that the building of the field, and bringing Joe back, is Ray's penance for this estrangement. Arriving at the farm, they see various 1920s all-star players, fielding a second team. A game is played and Graham finally gets to bat.

The next day, Mark returns, demanding Ray sell the farm or the bank will foreclose. Karin insists people will pay to watch the ballgames. Mann agrees, saying that "people will come" to relive their childhood innocence. Ray and Mark scuffle, accidentally knocking Karin off the bleachers. Graham—knowing he will be unable to return after stepping off the field—saves Karin from choking on a hot dog. Now old Doc Graham again, he insists he has no regrets. Heading back toward the cornfield, the other players commend him, and before he disappears, Shoeless Joe calls out, "Hey, rookie! You were good." Doc Graham's eyes shine with tears, he smiles, and goes. Suddenly, Mark can see the players and urges Ray to keep the farm.

Shoeless Joe invites Mann to enter the corn, who happily accepts. Ray is angry at not being invited but Joe rebukes him, glancing towards the catcher at home plate, saying, "If you build it, he will come." The catcher removes his mask, and Ray recognizes his father as a young man. Ray and Annie then understand that "ease his pain" and "go the distance" both refer to him and his father.

John introduces himself to Ray, thanking him for the field. Ray introduces his father to his wife and daughter as "John". Later, as evening falls, John says goodnight to him and they shake hands. As John is walking towards the cornfield, Ray asks "Dad" if he would like to play catch. John gladly accepts, as a long line of cars is seen approaching the field, fulfilling the prophecy that "people will come" to the field to watch baseball.

== Cast ==
- Kevin Costner as Ray Kinsella
- Amy Madigan as Annie Kinsella
- James Earl Jones as Terence Mann
- Timothy Busfield as Mark
- Ray Liotta as Shoeless Joe Jackson
- Burt Lancaster as Dr. Archibald "Moonlight" Graham
  - Frank Whaley as young Archibald Graham
- Dwier Brown as John Kinsella
- Gaby Hoffmann as Karin Kinsella
- Kelly Coffield Park as Dee, Mark's wife
- Lee Garlington as Beulah Gasnick
- Michael Milhoan as Buck Weaver (third baseman)
- Steve Eastin as Eddie Cicotte (pitcher)
- Charles Hoyes as Swede Risberg (catcher)
- Art LaFleur as Chick Gandil (first baseman)

In addition, Anne Seymour, who died four months before the film's release, makes her final film appearance, as Veda Ponikvar, the kindly Chisholm publisher who helps Ray and Mann. The identity of the actor who provided "The Voice", who speaks to Ray throughout the film, has remained unconfirmed since the film's release. Some believe it is Costner or Liotta, but the book's author W. P. Kinsella said he was told it was Ed Harris (Madigan's husband). Then-teenagers Matt Damon and Ben Affleck were extras in the Fenway Park scene.

== Production ==
Film rights to W. P. Kinsella's novel were initially optioned in 1983 by producers William Blaylock and Peter W. Rea. After that option lapsed, 20th Century Fox acquired the rights in 1985, with Phil Alden Robinson attached to adapt the novel.

20th Century Fox executive Sara Colleton first discovered and optioned Shoeless Joe in the early 1980s. Colleton developed the project with producers Lawrence and Charles Gordon. Lawrence Gordon worked for 20th Century Fox, part of the time as its president, and repeatedly mentioned that the book should be adapted into a film, but the studio always turned down the suggestion because they felt the project was too esoteric and noncommercial—Fox's Production Chief, Scott Rudin, eventually withdrew his support and put Field of Dreams into turnaround. Meanwhile, Phil Alden Robinson went ahead with his script, frequently consulting Kinsella for advice on the adaptation. Lawrence Gordon left Fox in 1986 and started pitching the adaptation to other studios. Universal Pictures accepted the project in 1987 and hired University of Southern California (USC) baseball coach Rod Dedeaux as advisor. Dedeaux brought along World Series champion and USC alumnus Don Buford to coach the actors.

The film was shot using the novel's title; eventually, an executive decision was made to rename it Field of Dreams. Robinson did not like the name, saying he loved Shoeless Joe, and that the new title was better suited for one about dreams deferred. Kinsella told Robinson after the fact that his original title for the book had been The Dream Field and that the publisher had imposed the title Shoeless Joe.

=== Casting ===
Robinson and the producers did not originally consider Kevin Costner for the part of Ray Kinsella because they did not think that he would want to follow Bull Durham with another baseball film. The role of Ray was first offered to Tom Hanks but he turned it down. Since Robinson's directing debut In the Mood had been a commercial failure, Costner also said that he would help him with the production. Amy Madigan, a fan of the book, joined the cast as Ray's wife, Annie.

In the book, the writer Ray seeks out is real-life author J. D. Salinger. When Salinger threatened the production with a lawsuit if his name was used, Robinson decided to rewrite the character as reclusive Terence Mann. He wrote with James Earl Jones in mind because he thought it would be fun to see Ray trying to kidnap such a big man.

Robinson had originally envisioned Shoeless Joe Jackson as being played by an actor in his 40s, someone who would be older than Costner and who could thereby act as a father surrogate. Ray Liotta did not fit that criterion, but Robinson thought he would be a better fit for the part because he had the "sense of danger" and ambiguity which Robinson wanted in the character. The role of Moonlight Graham was offered to James Stewart but he turned it down.

Burt Lancaster had originally turned down the part of Moonlight Graham, but changed his mind after a friend, who was also a baseball fan, told him that he had to work on the film.

=== Filming ===
Filming began on May 25, 1988. The shooting schedule was built around Costner's availability because he would be leaving in August to film Revenge. Except for some weather delays and other time constraints, production rolled six days a week. The interior scenes were the first ones shot because the cornfield planted by the filmmakers was taking too long to grow. Irrigation had to be used to quickly grow the corn to Costner's height, with water being brought in by tanker from Lake Michigan. Primary shot locations were in Dubuque County, Iowa; a farm near Dyersville was used for the Kinsella home; an empty warehouse in Dubuque was used to build various interior sets. Galena, Illinois, served as Moonlight Graham's Chisholm, Minnesota. One week was spent on location shots in Boston, most notably Fenway Park.

Sue Riedel, a teacher in Iowa, was tasked with finding a farm that matched what the studio was looking for. "I had pictures of about 60 farms in the area," she said in 2021. "All of a sudden, I was driving around and I came up over this hill. There was this farm, the Lansing farm, and it just had this really picturesque look. I really thought it was the best property because it was set by itself. It was also totally surrounded by corn, which they really wanted."

Robinson, despite having a sufficient budget as well as the cast and crew he wanted, constantly felt tense and depressed during filming. He felt that he was under too much pressure to create an outstanding film, and that he was not doing justice to the original novel. Lawrence Gordon convinced him that the end product would be effective.

During a lunch with the Iowa Chamber of Commerce, Robinson broached his idea of a final scene in which headlights could be seen for miles along the horizon. The Chamber folks replied that it could be done and the shooting of the final scene became a community event. The film crew was hidden on the farm to make sure the aerial shots did not reveal them. A production assistant drove from the set into town and measured the distance between, deducing it would require 1,500 cars to fill the shot. Dyersville was then blacked out and local extras drove their vehicles to the field from Commercial Club Park. Riedel worked with local radio stations 92.9 KAT FM and WDBQ 1490 AM to broadcast the director's voice to the drivers of the cars. In order to give the illusion of movement, the drivers were instructed to continuously switch between their low and high beams.

=== Field ===
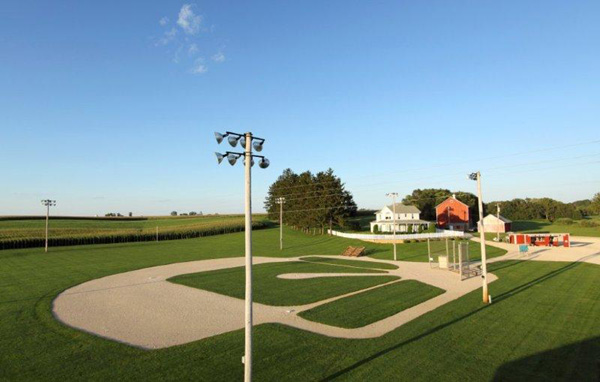
The Field of Dreams in Dyersville, Iowa, 2012

Scenes of the Kinsella farm were taken on the property of Don Lansing in Dyersville, Iowa; some of the baseball field scenes were shot on the neighboring farm of Al Ameskamp. Because the shooting schedule was too short for grass to naturally grow, the experts on sod laying responsible for Dodger Stadium and the Rose Bowl were hired to create the baseball field. Part of the process involved painting the turf green.

It was Costner's idea to have Ray hit the ball into the ground, instead of missing it, during the scene in which his character hits fly-balls to Shoeless Joe. Costner said to Robinson, "Do you know how hard it is to miss something on purpose?" Costner asked the director. "I can hit this ball straight down and have it dribble forward about four feet. That will be more humiliating." It was the only change Costner made to the script.

== Soundtrack ==
Leonard Bernstein was the first choice to compose the score for the film but he was overbooked. At first, James Horner was unsure if he could work on the film due to scheduling restrictions until he watched a rough cut and was so moved that he accepted the job of scoring it. Robinson had created a temp track which was disliked by Universal executives. When the announcement of Horner as composer was made, the executives felt more positive because they expected a big orchestral score, similar to Horner's work for An American Tail. Horner, in contrast, liked the temporary score, finding it "quiet and kind of ghostly". He decided to follow the idea of the temp track, creating an atmospheric soundtrack which would "focus on the emotions". The score was nominated for the Academy Award for Best Original Score but lost to the Alan Menken score for The Little Mermaid. In addition to Horner's score, portions of several pop songs are heard during the film. They are listed in the following order in the closing credits:

- "Crazy", written by Willie Nelson and performed by Beverly D'Angelo
- "Daydream", written by John Sebastian and performed by the Lovin' Spoonful
- "Jessica", written by Dickey Betts and performed by the Allman Brothers Band
- "China Grove", written by Tom Johnston and performed by the Doobie Brothers
- "Lotus Blossom", written by Billy Strayhorn and performed by Duke Ellington

== Historical connections ==
The character played by Burt Lancaster and Frank Whaley, Archibald "Moonlight" Graham, is based on an actual baseball player with the same name. His character is largely true to life except for a few factual liberties taken for artistic reasons. For instance, the real Graham's lone major league game occurred in June 1905, rather than on the final day of the 1922 season. The real Graham died in 1965, as opposed to 1972 as the film depicts. In the film, Terence Mann interviews a number of people about Graham. The DVD special points out that the facts they gave him were taken from articles written about the real man.

== Release ==
Universal scheduled Field of Dreams to open in the U.S. on April 21, 1989. The film debuted in just a few theaters and was gradually released to more screens so that it would have a spot among the summer blockbusters. It ended up playing until December. The film was released in the Philippines by Eastern Films on November 1, 1989.

== Reception ==
On Rotten Tomatoes the film has an approval rating of 88% based on 65 reviews, with an average rating of 7.90/10. The website's critics consensus reads: "Field of Dreams is sentimental, but in the best way; it's a mix of fairy tale, baseball, and family togetherness." On Metacritic the film has a weighted average score of 57 out of 100, based on 18 critics, indicating "mixed or average" reviews. Audiences surveyed by CinemaScore gave the film an average grade of "A" on scale of A+ to F.

Roger Ebert awarded the film a perfect four stars, admiring its ambition: "This is the kind of movie Frank Capra might have directed, and James Stewart might have starred in—a movie about dreams." Caryn James of The New York Times wrote: "A work so smartly written, so beautifully filmed, so perfectly acted, that it does the almost impossible trick of turning sentimentality into true emotion." Duane Byrge of The Hollywood Reporter praised Costner for his performance, writing that it was his "eye-on-the-ball exuberance that carries Dreams past its often mechanical aesthetic paces."

Variety gave the film a mixed review: "In spite of a script hobbled with cloying aphorisms and shameless sentimentality, Field of Dreams sustains a dreamy mood in which the idea of baseball is distilled to its purest essence."

Peter Travers at Rolling Stone panned the film, and wrote: "To be honest, I started hearing things, too. Just when Jones was delivering an inexcusably sappy speech about baseball being "a symbol of all that was once good in America," I heard the words "If he keeps talking, I'm walking.""

Former U.S. president George W. Bush named the film as his favorite, saying that it made him cry because it reminded him of playing catch with his father.

== Accolades ==
The film was nominated for three Academy Awards in 1990: Best Picture (Gordon & Gordon), Best Adapted Screenplay (Robinson), and Best Original Score (Horner). It did not win in any category.

Award	Category	Nominee(s)	Result
20/20 Awards	Best Adapted Screenplay	Phil Alden Robinson	Nominated
Academy Awards	Best Picture	Lawrence Gordon and Charles Gordon	Nominated
Academy Awards	Best Adapted Screenplay	Phil Alden Robinson	Nominated
Academy Awards	Best Original Score	James Horner	Nominated
American Cinema Editors Awards	Best Edited Feature Film	Ian Crafford	Nominated
Artios Awards	Outstanding Achievement in Feature Film Casting – Drama	Margery Simkin	Nominated
Blue Ribbon Awards	Best Foreign Film	Phil Alden Robinson	Won
Chicago Film Critics Association Awards	Best Supporting Actress	Amy Madigan	Nominated
Directors Guild of America Awards	Outstanding Directorial Achievement in Motion Pictures	Phil Alden Robinson	Nominated
Grammy Awards	Best Album of Original Instrumental Background Score Written for a Motion Picture or Television	James Horner	Nominated
Hochi Film Awards	Best Foreign Language Film	Phil Alden Robinson	Won
Hugo Awards	Best Dramatic Presentation	Phil Alden Robinson (director/screenplay), W.P. Kinsella (novel)	Nominated
Japan Academy Film Prize	Outstanding Foreign Language Film		Won
Kinema Junpo Awards	Best Foreign Language Film	Phil Alden Robinson	Won
National Board of Review Awards	Top Ten Films		10th Place
National Film Preservation Board	National Film Registry		Inducted
Saturn Awards	Best Fantasy Film		Nominated
Saturn Awards	Best Writing	Phil Alden Robinson	Nominated
Writers Guild of America Awards	Best Screenplay – Based on Material from Another Medium	Phil Alden Robinson	Nominated
Young Artist Awards	Best Young Actress Supporting Role in a Motion Picture	Gaby Hoffmann	Won

American Film Institute Lists

- AFI's 100 Years...100 Movie Quotes:
  - "If you build it, he will come."—#39
- AFI's 100 Years...100 Cheers—#28
- AFI's 10 Top 10—#6 Fantasy Film

In 2017, the US Library of Congress selected Field of Dreams as one of its 25 annual additions to the National Film Registry. The announcement quotes film critic Leonard Maltin, who called the film "a story of redemption and faith, in the tradition of the best Hollywood fantasies with moments of pure magic."

In 2006, Writers Guild of America West ranked its screenplay 88th in WGA’s list of 101 Greatest Screenplays. In June 2008, after having polled over 1,500 people in the creative community, AFI revealed its "Ten Top Ten" — the best ten films in ten "classic" American film genres. The film was acknowledged as the sixth best one in the fantasy genre.

== Home media ==
The film was released on VHS in 1989. It was later released on DVD on April 29, 1998. It was released on Blu-ray on March 13, 2011. It was released on 4K UHD Blu-Ray on May 14, 2019, for the film's 30th anniversary.

== Legacy ==
The ballpark that was built for the movie is maintained as a tourist attraction.

The first year after shooting the film, farm owner Al Ameskamp again grew corn on his property, but then restored his portion of the field the next year and added a souvenir shop. Farmer Don Lansing maintained his property as a tourist destination. He did not charge for admission or parking, deriving revenue solely from his own souvenir shop. By the film's twentieth anniversary, approximately 65,000 people visited annually. In July 2010, the farm containing the "Field" was listed for sale. It was sold on October 31, 2011, to Go The Distance Baseball, LLC for an undisclosed fee, believed to be around $5.4 million. In 2021, MLB veteran and Hall of Fame member Frank Thomas became the majority owner.

=== MLB at Field of Dreams ===
In 2019, Major League Baseball announced that it would hold a neutral-site regular season game between the Chicago White Sox and New York Yankees at the Dyersville site on August 13, 2020, playing on an 8,000-seat field constructed adjacent to the original, with a pathway connecting the two. The field would be modeled after the White Sox's former field, Comiskey Park (1910–1990). In July 2020, because of the shortened 2020 Major League Baseball season due to the COVID-19 pandemic, it was announced that the White Sox would be playing the St. Louis Cardinals instead of the Yankees. On August 3, 2020, Major League Baseball announced that the 2020 game was cancelled due to logistics.

The game was finally held on the field on August 12, 2021, with the originally announced matchup of the White Sox and Yankees. In the pre-game show, Kevin Costner emerged from the cornfield onto the outfield, followed by the players and managers from both teams. At the old-fashioned microphone in the diamond, Costner said, "Is this heaven? Yes, it is." The White Sox beat the Yankees 9–8, following a walk-off home run in the bottom of the 9th inning by Tim Anderson, after the Yankees had scored four runs in the top of the inning to take an 8–7 lead.

A second Field of Dreams game was played during the 2022 season on August 11 with the Cincinnati Reds – who beat the White Sox in the 1919 World Series that was marred by the Black Sox Scandal – facing the Chicago Cubs, with the Cubs winning 4–2. This time, the movie was referenced in the pregame ceremonies by Ken Griffey Jr. asking his father Ken Griffey Sr. if he wanted to play catch. Both Griffeys – who played for the Reds and also played together for the Seattle Mariners – were joined first by fathers and sons (and daughters) also playing catch. The Cubs and Reds then also entered from the cornfield beyond centerfield along with multiple National Baseball Hall of Fame members representing both teams – catcher Johnny Bench and shortstop Barry Larkin for the Reds along with second baseman Ryne Sandberg, outfielder Andre Dawson, pitcher Ferguson Jenkins and left fielder Billy Williams for the Cubs. Jenkins also threw the ceremonial first pitch to Bench.

On August 13, 2026 the Philadelphia Phillies faced the Minnesota Twins in the Field of Dreams game, which was for the first time broadcast exclusively on Netflix. The Phillies defeated the Twins 7-1 with a dominant pitching performance from Aaron Nola, a home run by Brandon Marsh, and two home runs by Kyle Schwarber, which put him in the lead for home runs in the MLB for the 2026 season. Bryson Stott and Bryce Harper were responsible for 1 RBI each. The Twins’ sole score was a home run scored by Luke Keaschall. The pregame featured appearances by MLB hall-of-fame players, and a helicopter fly-over, as well as the famous cornfield entrance by both teams. Bryce Harper sported specially-made corn-themed cleats and arm guards for the occasion.

=== Television series proposal ===
In August 2021, plans were announced to remake the film as a television series, produced by Lawrence Gordon and written by Michael Schur, for Peacock. In June 2022, it was revealed it was no longer moving forward as Peacock and Universal Television had begun shopping the project elsewhere. Chris Pratt had reportedly agreed to star in the series before dropping out, with the series said to have had a budget of $15 million per episode.

== See also ==
- List of baseball films
- List of ghost films
