= 1915 Chicago Cubs season =

1915 Chicago Cubs
- League: National League
- Ballpark: West Side Park
- City: Chicago
- Record: 73–80 (.477)
- League place: 4th
- Owners: Charles Phelps Taft
- Managers: Roger Bresnahan

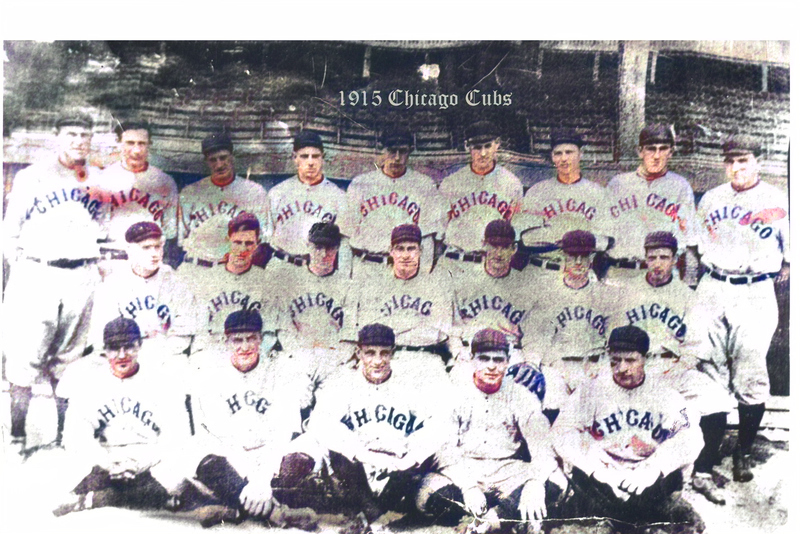
Photo of the 1915 Chicago Cubs baseball team.

The 1915 Chicago Cubs season was the 44th season of the Chicago Cubs franchise, the 40th in the National League and the 23rd and final at West Side Park. The Cubs finished fourth in the National League with a record of 73–80.

== Regular season ==
=== Season standings ===
National League
Team	W	L	Pct.	GB	Home	Road
Philadelphia Phillies	90	62	.592	—	49‍–‍27	41‍–‍35
Boston Braves	83	69	.546	7	49‍–‍27	34‍–‍42
Brooklyn Robins	80	72	.526	10	51‍–‍26	29‍–‍46
Chicago Cubs	73	80	.477	17½	42‍–‍34	31‍–‍46
Pittsburgh Pirates	73	81	.474	18	40‍–‍37	33‍–‍44
St. Louis Cardinals	72	81	.471	18½	42‍–‍36	30‍–‍45
Cincinnati Reds	71	83	.461	20	39‍–‍37	32‍–‍46
New York Giants	69	83	.454	21	37‍–‍38	32‍–‍45

=== Record vs. opponents ===
1915 National League record Sources:
Team	BSN	BRO	CHI	CIN	NYG	PHI	PIT	STL
Boston	—	14–8–1	10–12–1	15–7	13–9–1	7–14	15–7	9–12–2
Brooklyn	8–14–1	—	14–8	11–11–1	12–8	13–9	11–11	11–11
Chicago	12–10–1	8–14	—	13–9–2	8–14	7–14	13–9	12–10
Cincinnati	7–15	11–11–1	9–13–2	—	9–13–1	9–13	12–10–1	14–8–1
New York	9–13–1	8–12	14–8	13–9–1	—	7–15–1	8–14	10–12
Philadelphia	14–7	9–13	14–7	13–9	15–7–1	—	10–12	15–7
Pittsburgh	7–15	11–11	9–13	10–12–1	14–8	12–10	—	10–12–1
St. Louis	12–9–2	11–11	10–12	8–14–1	12–10	7–15	12–10–1	—

== Roster ==
1915 Chicago Cubs
Roster
Pitchers: Karl Adams; Larry Cheney; Phil Douglas; Brad Hogg; Bert Humphries; Jimmy Lavender; George Pierce; Ed Schorr; Pete Standridge; Hippo Vaughn; Bob Wright; Zip Zabel	Catchers: Jimmy Archer; Roger Bresnahan; Bubbles Hargrave; Bob O'Farrell; Jack Wallace; Infielders: Red Corriden; Bob Fisher; Chick Keating; Alex McCarthy; Polly McLarry; Eddie Mulligan; Art Phelan; Vic Saier; Joe Schultz; Heinie Zimmerman	Outfielders: John Fluhrer; Wilbur Good; Pete Knisely; Red Murray; Wildfire Schulte; Cy Williams	Manager: Roger Bresnahan

== Player stats ==
=== Batting ===
==== Starters by position ====
Note: Pos = Position; G = Games played; AB = At bats; H = Hits; Avg. = Batting average; HR = Home runs; RBI = Runs batted in

Pos	Player	G	AB	H	Avg.	HR	RBI
C	Jimmy Archer	97	309	75	.243	1	27
1B	Vic Saier	144	497	131	.264	11	64
2B	Heinie Zimmerman	139	520	138	.265	3	62
SS	Bob Fisher	147	568	163	.287	5	53
3B	Art Phelan	133	448	98	.219	3	35
OF	Wilbur Good	128	498	126	.253	2	27
OF	Frank Schulte	151	550	137	.249	12	62
OF	Cy Williams	151	518	133	.257	13	64

==== Other batters ====
Note: G = Games played; AB = At bats; H = Hits; Avg. = Batting average; HR = Home runs; RBI = Runs batted in

Player	G	AB	H	Avg.	HR	RBI
Roger Bresnahan	77	221	45	.204	1	19
Red Murray	51	144	43	.299	0	11
Pete Knisely	64	134	33	.246	0	17
Polly McLarry	68	127	25	.197	1	12
Alex McCarthy	23	72	19	.264	1	6
Eddie Mulligan	11	22	8	.364	0	2
Bubbles Hargrave	15	19	3	.158	0	2
Chick Keating	4	8	0	.000	0	0
Joe Schultz	7	8	2	.250	0	3
Jack Wallace	2	7	2	.286	0	1
John Fluhrer	6	6	2	.333	0	0
Red Corriden	6	3	0	.000	0	0
Bob O'Farrell	2	3	1	.333	0	0

=== Pitching ===
==== Starting pitchers ====
Note: G = Games pitched; IP = Innings pitched; W = Wins; L = Losses; ERA = Earned run average; SO = Strikeouts

Player	G	IP	W	L	ERA	SO
Hippo Vaughn	41	269.2	20	12	2.87	148
Bert Humphries	31	171.2	8	13	2.31	45
Larry Cheney	25	131.1	8	9	3.56	68
Phil Douglas	4	25.0	1	1	2.16	18
Brad Hogg	2	13.0	1	0	2.08	0

==== Other pitchers ====
Note: G = Games pitched; IP = Innings pitched; W = Wins; L = Losses; ERA = Earned run average; SO = Strikeouts

Player	G	IP	W	L	ERA	SO
Jimmy Lavender	41	220.0	10	16	2.58	117
George Pierce	36	176.0	13	9	3.32	96
Zip Zabel	36	163.0	7	10	3.20	60
Karl Adams	26	107.0	1	9	4.71	57

==== Relief pitchers ====
Note: G = Games pitched; W = Wins; L = Losses; SV = Saves; ERA = Earned run average; SO = Strikeouts

Player	G	W	L	SV	ERA	SO
Pete Standridge	29	4	1	0	3.61	42
Ed Schorr	2	6	0	0	7.50	3
Bob Wright	2	0	0	0	2.25	3
