= 1915 Brooklyn Robins season =

1915 Brooklyn Robins
- League: National League
- Ballpark: Ebbets Field
- City: Brooklyn, New York
- Record: 80–72 (.526)
- League place: 3rd
- Owners: Charles Ebbets, Ed McKeever, Stephen McKeever
- President: Charles Ebbets
- Managers: Wilbert Robinson

The 1915 Brooklyn Robins season improved enough to finish in third place, just 10 games behind the National League champion Philadelphia Phillies. It was the teams first winning season since 1903 when they were still known as the Superbas.

== Regular season ==
=== Season standings ===
National League
Team	W	L	Pct.	GB	Home	Road
Philadelphia Phillies	90	62	.592	—	49‍–‍27	41‍–‍35
Boston Braves	83	69	.546	7	49‍–‍27	34‍–‍42
Brooklyn Robins	80	72	.526	10	51‍–‍26	29‍–‍46
Chicago Cubs	73	80	.477	17½	42‍–‍34	31‍–‍46
Pittsburgh Pirates	73	81	.474	18	40‍–‍37	33‍–‍44
St. Louis Cardinals	72	81	.471	18½	42‍–‍36	30‍–‍45
Cincinnati Reds	71	83	.461	20	39‍–‍37	32‍–‍46
New York Giants	69	83	.454	21	37‍–‍38	32‍–‍45

=== Record vs. opponents ===
1915 National League record Sources:
Team	BSN	BRO	CHI	CIN	NYG	PHI	PIT	STL
Boston	—	14–8–1	10–12–1	15–7	13–9–1	7–14	15–7	9–12–2
Brooklyn	8–14–1	—	14–8	11–11–1	12–8	13–9	11–11	11–11
Chicago	12–10–1	8–14	—	13–9–2	8–14	7–14	13–9	12–10
Cincinnati	7–15	11–11–1	9–13–2	—	9–13–1	9–13	12–10–1	14–8–1
New York	9–13–1	8–12	14–8	13–9–1	—	7–15–1	8–14	10–12
Philadelphia	14–7	9–13	14–7	13–9	15–7–1	—	10–12	15–7
Pittsburgh	7–15	11–11	9–13	10–12–1	14–8	12–10	—	10–12–1
St. Louis	12–9–2	11–11	10–12	8–14–1	12–10	7–15	12–10–1	—

=== Notable transactions ===
- April 23, 1915: Dick Egan was purchased from the Robins by the Boston Braves.
- June 13, 1915: Phil Douglas was purchased by the Robins from the Cincinnati Reds.
- August 1915: Joe Schultz and cash were traded by the Robins to the Chicago Cubs for Larry Cheney.
- September 8, 1915: Phil Douglas was purchased from the Robins by the Chicago Cubs.

=== Roster ===
1915 Brooklyn Robins
Roster
Pitchers: Raleigh Aitchison; Ed Appleton; Elmer Brown; Leon Cadore; Larry Cheney; Jack Coombs; Wheezer Dell; Phil Douglas; Duster Mails; Rube Marquard; Jeff Pfeffer; Pat Ragan; Nap Rucker; Charlie Schmutz; Sherry Smith	Catchers: Lew McCarty; Otto Miller; Mack Wheat; Infielders: George Cutshaw; Jake Daubert; Dick Egan; Gus Getz; John Karst; Ollie O'Mara; Ivy Olson; Joe Schultz	Outfielders: John Hummel; Hy Myers; Al Nixon; Red Smyth; Casey Stengel; Zack Wheat; Bill Zimmerman	Manager: Wilbert Robinson

== Player stats ==
=== Batting ===
==== Starters by position ====
Note: Pos = Position; G = Games played; AB = At bats; H = Hits; Avg. = Batting average; HR = Home runs; RBI = Runs batted in

Pos	Player	G	AB	H	Avg.	HR	RBI
C	Lew McCarty	84	276	66	.239	0	19
1B	Jake Daubert	150	544	164	.301	2	47
2B	George Cutshaw	154	566	139	.246	0	62
3B	Gus Getz	130	477	123	.258	2	46
SS	Ollie O'Mara	149	577	141	.244	0	31
OF	Hy Myers	153	605	150	.248	2	46
OF	Zack Wheat	146	528	136	.258	5	66
OF	Casey Stengel	132	459	109	.237	3	50

==== Other batters ====
Note: G = Games played; AB = At bats; H = Hits; Avg. = Batting average; HR = Home runs; RBI = Runs batted in

Player	G	AB	H	Avg.	HR	RBI
Otto Miller	84	254	57	.224	0	25
Joe Schultz	56	120	35	.292	0	4
John Hummel	53	100	23	.230	0	8
Bill Zimmerman	22	57	16	.281	0	7
Al Nixon	14	26	6	.231	0	2
Ivy Olson	18	26	2	.077	0	3
Red Smyth	19	22	3	.136	0	3
Mack Wheat	14	14	1	.071	0	0
Dick Egan	3	3	0	.000	0	0
John Karst	1	0	0	----	0	0

=== Pitching ===
==== Starting pitchers ====
Note: G = Games pitched; IP = Innings pitched; W = Wins; L = Losses; ERA = Earned run average; SO = Strikeouts

Player	G	IP	W	L	ERA	SO
Jeff Pfeffer	40	291.2	19	14	2.10	84
Jack Coombs	29	195.2	15	10	2.58	56
Sherry Smith	29	173.2	14	8	2.59	52
Nap Rucker	19	122.2	9	4	2.42	38
Larry Cheney	5	27.0	0	2	1.67	11

==== Other pitchers ====
Note: G = Games pitched; IP = Innings pitched; W = Wins; L = Losses; ERA = Earned run average; SO = Strikeouts

Player	G	IP	W	L	ERA	SO
Wheezer Dell	40	215.0	11	10	2.34	94
Ed Appleton	34	138.1	4	10	3.32	50
Phil Douglas	20	116.2	5	5	2.62	63
Raleigh Aitchison	7	32.2	0	4	4.96	14
Rube Marquard	6	24.2	2	2	6.20	13
Leon Cadore	7	21.0	0	2	5.57	12

==== Relief pitchers ====
Note: G = Games pitched; W = Wins; L = Losses; SV = Saves; ERA = Earned run average; SO = Strikeouts

Player	G	W	L	SV	ERA	SO
Pat Ragan	5	1	0	0	0.92	7
Duster Mails	2	0	1	0	3.60	3
Charlie Schmutz	1	0	0	0	6.75	1
Elmer Brown	1	0	0	0	9.00	1
