= 1915 in baseball =

The following are the baseball events of the year 1915 throughout the world.

== Champions ==
- World Series: Boston Red Sox over Philadelphia Phillies (4–1)

Inter-league playoff: Boston (AL) declined challenge by Chicago (FL)

Inter-league playoff: Philadelphia (NL) declined challenge by Chicago (FL)

== Statistical leaders ==
Any team shown in small text indicates a previous team a player was on during the season.

	American League		National League		Federal League	
Stat	Player	Total	Player	Total	Player	Total
AVG	Ty Cobb (DET)	.369	Larry Doyle (NYG)	.320	Benny Kauff (BKF)	.342
HR	Braggo Roth (CLE/CWS)	7	Gavvy Cravath (PHI)	24	Hal Chase (BUF)	17
RBI	Sam Crawford (DET); Bobby Veach (DET)	112	Gavvy Cravath (PHI)	115	Dutch Zwilling (CWH)	94
W	Walter Johnson (WSH)	27	Grover Alexander^{1} (PHI)	31	George McConnell (CWH)	25
ERA	Smoky Joe Wood (BOS)	1.49	Grover Alexander^{1} (PHI)	1.22	Earl Moseley (NWK)	1.91
K	Walter Johnson (WSH)	203	Grover Alexander^{1} (PHI)	241	Dave Davenport (SLT)	229

^{1} Major league Triple Crown pitching winner

== Major league baseball final standings ==
=== American League final standings ===
American League
Team	W	L	Pct.	GB	Home	Road
Boston Red Sox	101	50	.669	—	55‍–‍20	46‍–‍30
Detroit Tigers	100	54	.649	2½	51‍–‍26	49‍–‍28
Chicago White Sox	93	61	.604	9½	54‍–‍24	39‍–‍37
Washington Senators	85	68	.556	17	50‍–‍29	35‍–‍39
New York Yankees	69	83	.454	32½	37‍–‍43	32‍–‍40
St. Louis Browns	63	91	.409	39½	35‍–‍38	28‍–‍53
Cleveland Indians	57	95	.375	44½	27‍–‍50	30‍–‍45
Philadelphia Athletics	43	109	.283	58½	19‍–‍53	24‍–‍56

Locations of teams for the 1915–1922 American League seasons
American League

=== National League final standings ===
National League
Team	W	L	Pct.	GB	Home	Road
Philadelphia Phillies	90	62	.592	—	49‍–‍27	41‍–‍35
Boston Braves	83	69	.546	7	49‍–‍27	34‍–‍42
Brooklyn Robins	80	72	.526	10	51‍–‍26	29‍–‍46
Chicago Cubs	73	80	.477	17½	42‍–‍34	31‍–‍46
Pittsburgh Pirates	73	81	.474	18	40‍–‍37	33‍–‍44
St. Louis Cardinals	72	81	.471	18½	42‍–‍36	30‍–‍45
Cincinnati Reds	71	83	.461	20	39‍–‍37	32‍–‍46
New York Giants	69	83	.454	21	37‍–‍38	32‍–‍45

Locations of teams for the 1915 National League season
National League

=== Federal League final standings ===
Federal League
Team	W	L	Pct.	GB	Home	Road
Chicago Whales	86	66	.566	—	44‍–‍32	42‍–‍34
St. Louis Terriers	87	67	.565	—	43‍–‍34	44‍–‍33
Pittsburgh Rebels	86	67	.562	½	45‍–‍31	41‍–‍36
Kansas City Packers	81	72	.529	5½	46‍–‍31	35‍–‍41
Newark Peppers	80	72	.526	6	40‍–‍39	40‍–‍33
Buffalo Blues	74	78	.487	12	37‍–‍40	37‍–‍38
Brooklyn Tip-Tops	70	82	.461	16	34‍–‍40	36‍–‍42
Baltimore Terrapins	47	107	.305	40	24‍–‍51	23‍–‍56

Locations of teams for the 1915 Federal League season
Federal League

== Events ==
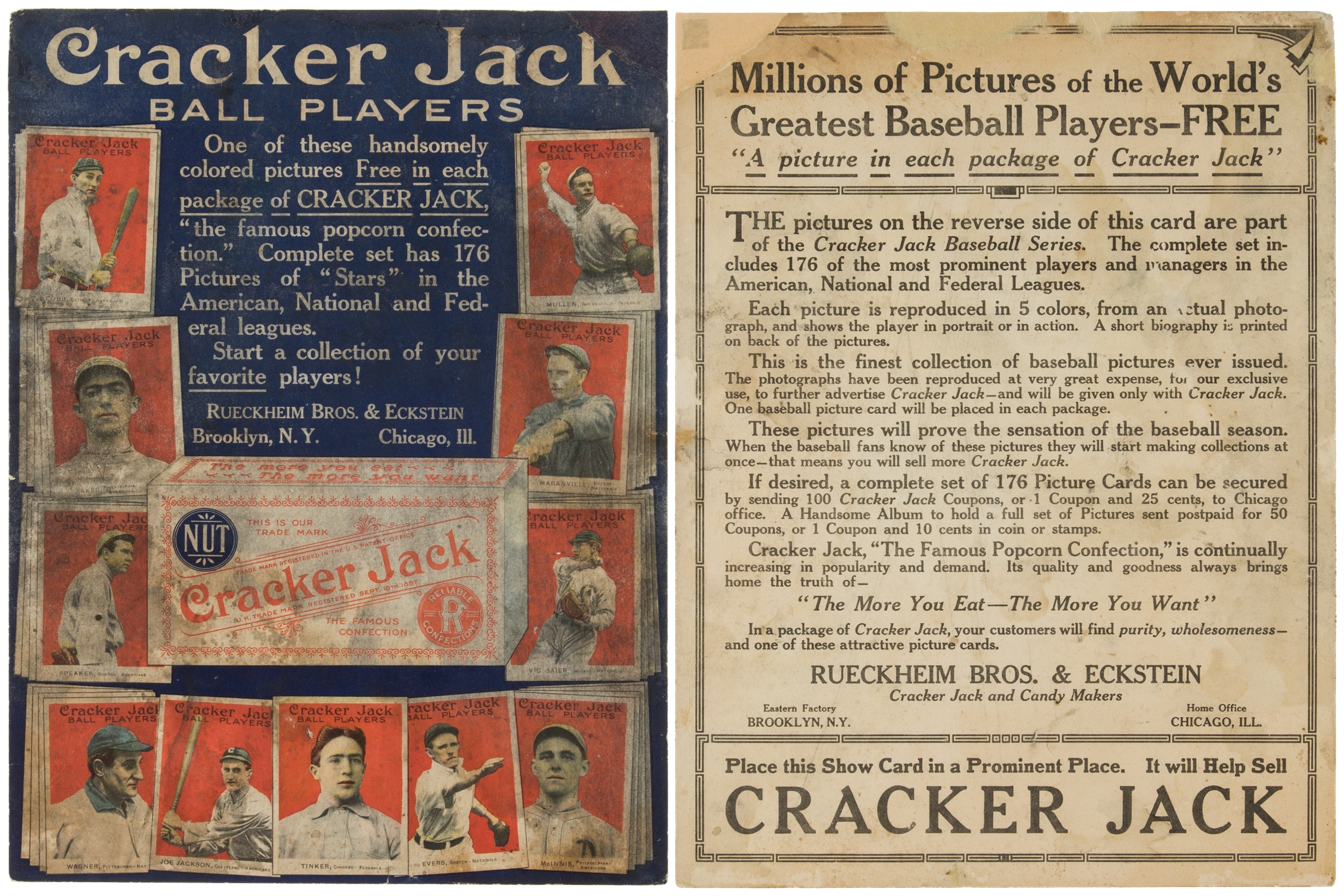
1915 advertisement

- January 2 – The St. Louis Cardinals try to prevent outfielder Lee Magee from playing for the Brooklyn Tip-Tops of the Federal League. Like most such suits, it will fail. Magee will play and manage in the rival major league.
- January 4 – Infielder Hans Lobert, well known as the fastest man in the National League, is traded by the Philadelphia Phillies to the New York Giants in exchange for pitcher Al Demaree, infielder Milt Stock, and catcher Bert Adams.
- January 17 – Cleveland newspapers reported that the Indians had been chosen to replace the previous nickname of the Naps local team. They became the Bronchos in 1902 before taking on the name Naps the following year in honour of their player-manager Nap Lajoie, who was purchased by the Philadelphia Athletics at beginning of the year. A false rumor claimed that the origin of the Indians name was former Cleveland Spiders outfielder Chief Sockalexis, regarded as the first man of Native American ancestry to play in Major League Baseball.
- February 24, 1915 – William Stephen Devery and Thomas A. Fogarty, owners of the Jersey City Skeeters, forfeited the franchise to the International League.
- April 15 – Rube Marquard of the New York Giants tosses a no-hitter against the Brooklyn Robins in a 2–0 Giants win.
- May 6:
  - Boston Red Sox pitcher Babe Ruth hit his first major league career home run off the Yankees' Jack Warhop at New York's Polo Grounds.
  - Philadelphia Athletics catcher Wally Schang set an American League record after nailing six potential base stealers during a 3–0 loss to the St. Louis Browns.
- May 12 – Red Faber of the Chicago White Sox uses only 67 pitches in a complete game victory, beating the Washington Senators on three hits, 4–1.
- June 5 – Grover Alexander pitches a one-hit 5–0 victory over the St. Louis Cardinals at St. Louis.
- June 15 – In a pitching duel at Fenway Park‚ Smoky Joe Wood of the Boston Red Sox bests Chicago White Sox ace Red Faber‚ 3–0, and knocks Chicago into second place. Each pitcher allows five hits and strikes out five. Bobby Wallace makes his umpiring debut. Wallace had been discarded by the St. Louis Browns and refused an offer from the St. Louis Cardinals‚ but he will tire of umpiring after the season ends and return to play with the Browns.
- June 17 – Zip Zabel comes out of the Chicago Cubs bullpen with two outs in the first inning to face the Brooklyn Robins. Zabel wins the game in the 19th inning, 4–3, in the longest relief effort in major league history. Brooklyn starter Jeff Pfeffer goes the distance, scattering 15 hits as he labors 18 2/3 innings, only to lose on a throwing error by second baseman George Cutshaw.
- June 23 – In his major league debut, Bruno Haas of the Philadelphia A's pitches a complete game. Haas walks 16 batters in nine innings as the A's fall to the Yankees 15–7.
- July 5 – Cincinnati Reds third baseman Heinie Groh hits for the cycle against the Chicago Cubs, becoming the only player to do so between 1913 and 1917, and the last Reds player to do so until 1940.
- August 18 – Wilbur Good became the only Chicago Cubs player ever to steal second base, third, and home — all in the same inning. His teammates followed his good example and went on to beat the Brooklyn Robins 9–0.
- August 31 – In the first game of a doubleheader, Jimmy Lavender pitches a no-hitter, leading the Chicago Cubs to a 2–0 victory over the New York Giants.
- September 11 – Eddie Plank of the Federal League St. Louis Terriers records his 300th career win.
- September 29 – Phillies pitcher Grover Cleveland Alexander pitches a complete game, giving up only one hit in a 5–0 victory over the Boston Braves in Boston to clinch their very first National League pennant.
- October 13 – The Boston Red Sox defeat the Philadelphia Phillies, 5–4, in Game 5 of the World Series to win their third World Championship title, four games to one. The Phillies would not appear in the Series again until 1950.

== Births ==
=== January ===
- January 3 – Sid Hudson
- January 6 – Tom Ferrick
- January 6 – Chuck Workman
- January 7 – Red Steiner
- January 8 – Walker Cooper
- January 11 – Dutch Mele
- January 12 – Roy Easterwood
- January 13 – Mike Dejan
- January 13 – Mike Milosevich
- January 14 – Bob Joyce
- January 15 – Dick Culler
- January 17 – Lum Harris
- January 17 – Mayo Smith
- January 26 – Rip Russell
- January 27 – Buck Etchison

=== February ===
- February 1 – Woody Abernathy
- February 3 – Buck Ross
- February 9 – Harvey Green
- February 10 – Ralph Hodgin
- February 10 – Karl Winsch
- February 13 – Oad Swigart
- February 14 – Red Barrett
- February 18 – Lew Flick
- February 18 – Joe Gordon
- February 25 – Roy Weatherly
- February 26 – Stew Bowers
- February 26 – Bill Conroy

=== March ===
- March 1 – Nick Strincevich
- March 2 – Babe Barna
- March 5 – Vic Bradford
- March 5 – Stan Ferens
- March 5 – Harry Shuman
- March 6 – Pete Gray
- March 6 – Bob Swift
- March 7 – Soup Campbell
- March 7 – Jim Reninger
- March 13 – Buzz Clarkson
- March 15 – Don Lang
- March 19 – Joe Gonzales
- March 20 – Stan Spence
- March 21 – Bill Brandt
- March 22 – Norm Branch
- March 25 – Chris Hartje
- March 27 – Newt Kimball
- March 28 – Joe Krakauskas
- March 29 – Johnny Gorsica

=== April ===
- April 1 – Jeff Heath
- April 2 – Al Barlick
- April 8 – Kirby Higbe
- April 9 – Steve Shemo
- April 13 – Oscar Grimes
- April 15 – Joe Hoover
- April 19 – Harry Craft
- April 19 – Glenn McQuillen
- April 20 – Eric Tipton
- April 23 – Walter Brown

=== May ===
- May 1 – Bob Harris
- May 2 – Whitey Miller
- May 2 – Ken Richardson
- May 4 – Don Manno
- May 4 – Ox Miller
- May 6 – Les Webber
- May 12 – Harry Dean
- May 14 – Red Hayworth
- May 19 – Jake Early
- May 22 – Otey Clark
- May 24 – Ed Wheeler
- May 29 – Vance Dinges

=== June ===
- June 1 – Bud Metheny
- June 4 – Bill Holland
- June 6 – Ray Stoviak
- June 23 – Johnny Humphries
- June 23 – Aaron Robinson
- June 24 – Buster Adams
- June 26 – Willard Brown
- June 27 – Fred Martin
- June 29 – Dizzy Trout
- June 30 – Roberto Ortiz

=== July ===
- July 1 – Boots Poffenberger
- July 1 – Babe Young
- July 2 – Hal Wagner
- July 9 – Tony Criscola
- July 10 – George Dickey
- July 15 – John Antonelli
- July 15 – John Davis
- July 15 – Lefty Scott
- July 20 – Gene Hasson
- July 21 – Claude Corbitt
- July 21 – Connie Creeden
- July 22 – Butch Sutcliffe
- July 23 – Hersh Lyons
- July 26 – Mel Deutsch
- July 27 – Dick Kimble
- July 30 – Jerry Witte
- July 31 – Jess Pike

=== August ===
- August 4 – Luke Easter
- August 7 – Les Fleming
- August 9 – Arnie Moser
- August 15 – Charley Suche
- August 18 – Max Lanier
- August 18 – Agapito Mayor
- August 19 – Bill Nagel
- August 23 – Gil Torres
- August 24 – Chubby Dean
- August 25 – Joe Gantenbein
- August 26 – Heinz Becker
- August 27 – Emil Verban
- August 29 – Ford Garrison

=== September ===
- September 3 – Eddie Stanky
- September 3 – Lefty West
- September 5 – Bob Maier
- September 7 – Regino Otero
- September 8 – Len Gabrielson
- September 13 – Morrie Aderholt
- September 19 – Paul Kardow
- September 21 – Ed Walczak
- September 22 – Reese Diggs
- September 27 – Harry Chozen

=== October ===
- October 1 – Red Tramback
- October 3 – Charlie Letchas
- October 6 – Dutch Meyer
- October 10 – Harry Eisenstat
- October 12 – Lou Novikoff
- October 14 – William Ford
- October 14 – Ken Heintzelman
- October 14 – Max Macon
- October 16 – Paul Masterson
- October 17 – Mike Sandlock
- October 18 – George Gick
- October 19 – Sam Nahem
- October 30 – Red Borom

=== November ===
- November 8 – Wayne Ambler
- November 9 – Benny McCoy
- November 11 – George Case
- November 11 – Bill Lefebvre
- November 13 – Ted Wilks
- November 16 – Garth Mann
- November 16 – Blas Monaco
- November 20 – Jack Aragón
- November 23 – Bob Kahle
- November 24 – Dick West
- November 25 – Bob Finley

=== December ===
- December 3 – Butch Wensloff
- December 5 – Bobby Mattick
- December 7 – Johnny Gee
- December 7 – Vinnie Smith
- December 14 – Paul Erickson
- December 18 – Johnny Barrett
- December 19 – Mickey Witek
- December 19 – Eddie Yount
- December 20 – Marv Felderman
- December 24 – Frank Trechock
- December 26 – Frank Dascoli
- December 28 – Hank Sweeney

== Deaths ==
=== January–March ===
- January 27 – John Coleman, 54, pitcher for the 1890 Philadelphia Phillies.
- January 29 – George Baker, 57, outfielder who played from 1883 through 1886 for the Baltimore Orioles, St. Louis Maroons, and Kansas City Cowboys.
- February 5 – Ross Barnes, 64, star second baseman of the 1870s who batted .359 lifetime, winning first National League batting title with .429 mark, also leading league in runs, hits, doubles, triples and walks.
- February 9 – Red Waller, 31, who pitched in one game for the 1909 New York Giants of the National League.
- February 17 – Jersey Bakley, 50, 19th century pitcher for nine teams in four different leagues, who posted a 3.66 ERA and struck out 669 in 215 games, even though he had a 76–125 record.
- February 24 – George Moolic, 47, backup catcher for the Chicago White Stockings 1886 National League champions.
- February 24 – Adonis Terry, 50, 1890s pitcher for the Brooklyn, Pittsburgh and Chicago teams, who won 197 games, including two no-hitters.
- March 15 – Jim Donnelly, 49, 19th century third baseman who hit .230 in eleven seasons for nine teams in two different leagues.

=== April–June ===
- April 9 – Rabbit Robinson, 33, infielder/outfielder for the Washington Senators (1903), Detroit Tigers (1904), and Cincinnati Reds (1910).
- April 15 – Frank Figgemeier, 41, pitcher who played for the 1894 Philadelphia Phillies of the National League.
- April 21 – Jack Allen, 59, National League third baseman who played for the Syracuse Stars and the Cleveland Blues during the 1879 season.
- May 4 – Chuck Lauer, 50, National League outfielder for the Pittsburgh Alleghenys (1884, 1889) and the Chicago Colts (1890).
- June 2 – Dave Orr, 55, first baseman and a perennial .300 hitter for five teams in three different leagues during eight seasons, who led American Association in average and runs batted in 1884, led twice in hits and triples, and posted a career .342 average while collecting 100 or more RBI in four seasons.
- June 4 – Tim Hurst, 49, umpire for nine National League seasons between 1891 and 1903 and in the American League from 1905 to 1909; officiated in Temple Cup series of 1894–95, managed the 1898 Browns, and also was a colorful figure known for his combative relations with players.
- June 6 – Tom Berry, 72, who appeared in one game for the 1871 Philadelphia Athletics.
- June 12 – Pat Crisham, 38, first baseman and catcher who hit .291 in 53 games for the Baltimore Orioles of the National League in 1899.
- June 18 – Charlie Faust, 34, who pitched in just two games for the 1911 New York Giants and stole two bases, but made his mark as John McGraw's good-luck charm and team's mascot.

=== July–September ===
- July 1 – Phil Coridan, 56, second baseman/outfielder for the Chicago Browns of the Union Association in 1884.
- July 7 – Mike DePangher, 56, catcher for the 1884 Philadelphia Quakers of the National League.
- July 18 – Larry McKeon, 49, pitcher who posted a 14–19 record and a 3.71 in 116 games for three teams in two different leagues from 1884 to 1886.
- July 26 – Charlie Reising, 53, outfielder for the 1884 Indianapolis Hoosiers of the American Association.
- August 21 – Blaine Thomas, 27, who pitched briefly for the 1911 Boston Red Sox.
- August 30 – William Coon, 60, catcher/right fielder for the 1975–1876 Philadelphia Athletics.
- September 9 – Albert Goodwill Spalding, 65, pitcher who led league in wins every season from 1871 to 1876, retiring at age 27 with 253 victories; also batted .313 lifetime, managed Chicago to 1876 pennant in NL's first season and guided team to three pennants as team president from 1882 to 1891; staged sport's first world tour in 1888.
- September 11 – John Carbine, 59, first baseman for the 1875 Keokuk Westerns and the 1876 Louisville Grays.
- September 16 – Wally Goldsmith, 65, utility infielder and catcher who played from 1868 to 1875 in the National Association with the Baltimore Marylands, Fort Wayne Kekiongas, Washington Olympics and Keokuk Westerns.
- September 23 – Brickyard Kennedy, 47, pitcher who won 20 games four times for Brooklyn, pitching also in the 1903 World Series for the Pirates.
- September 26 – Ed Cushman, 63, pitcher for six seasons, who threw a no-hitter on September 28, 1884.

=== October–December ===
- October 2 – Tommy Beals, 65, outfielder/second baseman for six seasons, five of them in the National Association.
- October 12 – Bert Myers, 41, third baseman who played from 1896 to 1900 for the St. Louis Browns, Washington Senators and Philadelphia Phillies.
- October 14 – Bill Reidy, 42, 19th century pitcher who posted a 27–41 record and a 4.17 ERA for three teams in two different leagues.
- October 19 – Russ McKelvy, 61, National League right fielder for the 1882 Indianapolis Blues, who also played with the Pittsburgh Alleghenys in 1882.
- October 27 – Martin Mullen, 63, right fielder in one game for the 1872 Cleveland Forest Citys of the National Association.
- November 2 – Fred Bunce, 68, National Association umpire.
- November 9 – Otis Johnson, 32, shortstop for the New York Highlanders of the American League in 1911.
- November 14 – Art McGovern, 33, Canadian catcher who played for the 1905 Boston Americans of the American League.
- December 4 – Andrew Freedman, 55, controversial owner of the New York Giants from 1895 to 1902, who concurrently owned Baltimore Orioles of the American League during 1902 and deliberately released key Baltimore personnel — including Hall of Famers John McGraw, Joe McGinnity and Roger Bresnahan — and signed them to contracts for the Giants.
- December 4 – Oscar Purner, 41, pitcher for the Washington Senators of the National League during the 1895 season.
- December 14 – Danny Murphy, 51, backup catcher for the 1892 New York Giants of the National League.
- December 15 – Tony Murphy, 56, American Association catcher who played for the 1884 New York Metropolitans.
- December 16 – John Hofford, 52, National League pitcher for the Pittsburgh Alleghenys of the American Association in 1885 and 1886.
- December 26 – Art Ball, 39, National League infielder for the 1894 St. Louis Browns and the 1898 Baltimore Orioles.
- December 26 – John Doyle, 57, Canadian pitcher who played in 1882 for the St. Louis Brown Stockings of the American Association.
- December 31 – Tip O'Neill, 57, Canadian left fielder for four teams in three different leagues, who won American Association batting titles in 1887 and 1888 while collecting a .326 average in 1052 games.
