= 1915 New York Giants season =

1915 New York Giants
- League: National League
- Ballpark: Polo Grounds
- City: New York City
- Record: 69–83 (.454)
- League place: 8th
- Owners: Harry Hempstead
- Managers: John McGraw

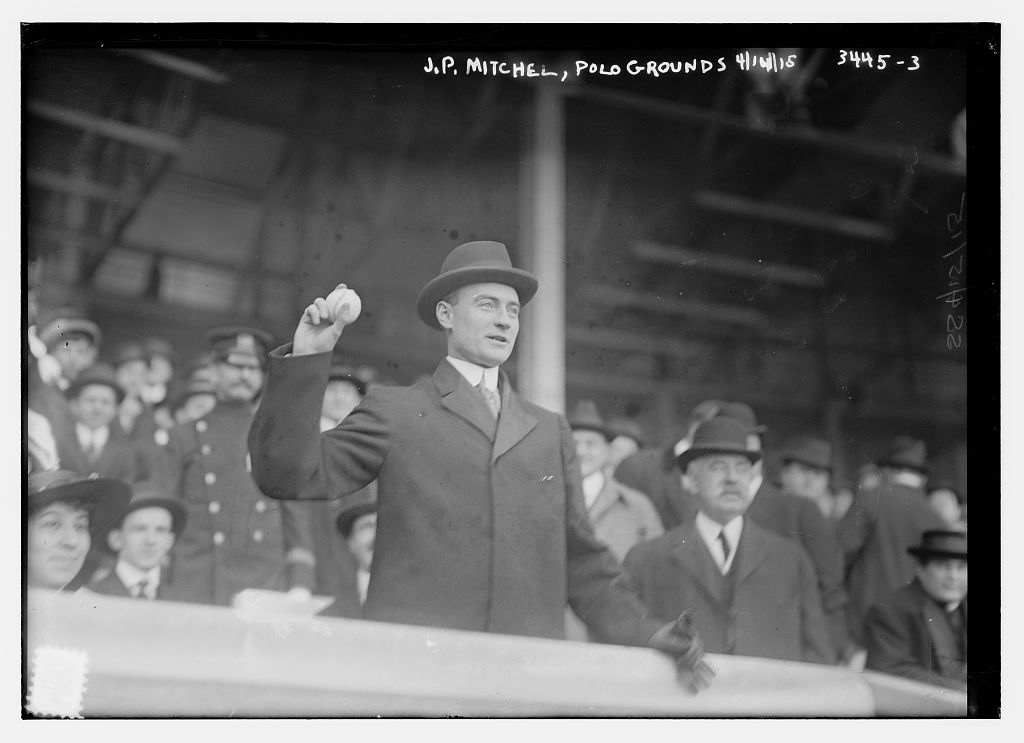
John Purroy Mitchel at the Giants opening game at the Polo Grounds on April 14, 1915, throwing out the ceremonial first pitch

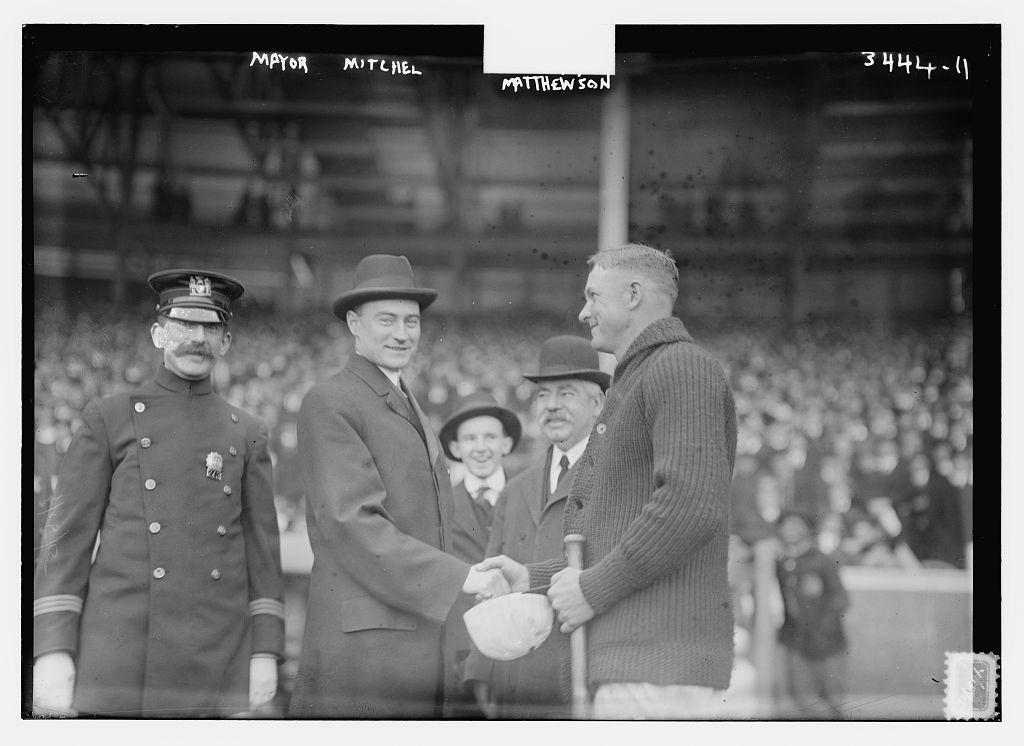
John Purroy Mitchel at the Giants opening game at the Polo Grounds on April 14, 1915, where he is shaking hands with Christy Mathewson

The 1915 New York Giants season was the franchise's 33rd season. The team finished eighth in the eight-team National League with a record of 69–83, 21 games behind the Philadelphia Phillies.

== Opening day game ==
Opening day was April 14, 1915, at the Polo Grounds against the Brooklyn Dodgers with 20,000 attendees. Mayor John Purroy Mitchel threw the ceremonial first pitch. The New York Giants Opening Day starting pitcher was Jeff Tesreau. The Giants won 16 to 3.

== Regular season ==
After finishing first in 1911, 1912, and 1913 and second in 1914, the Giants fell to last place in the National League in 1915. Much of the collapse was due to the pitching staff. Hall of Famers Christy Mathewson and Rube Marquard both struggled through subpar seasons. Marquard would be placed on waivers in August and claimed by the Brooklyn Robins.

=== Season standings ===
National League
Team	W	L	Pct.	GB	Home	Road
Philadelphia Phillies	90	62	.592	—	49‍–‍27	41‍–‍35
Boston Braves	83	69	.546	7	49‍–‍27	34‍–‍42
Brooklyn Robins	80	72	.526	10	51‍–‍26	29‍–‍46
Chicago Cubs	73	80	.477	17½	42‍–‍34	31‍–‍46
Pittsburgh Pirates	73	81	.474	18	40‍–‍37	33‍–‍44
St. Louis Cardinals	72	81	.471	18½	42‍–‍36	30‍–‍45
Cincinnati Reds	71	83	.461	20	39‍–‍37	32‍–‍46
New York Giants	69	83	.454	21	37‍–‍38	32‍–‍45

=== Record vs. opponents ===
1915 National League record Sources:
Team	BSN	BRO	CHI	CIN	NYG	PHI	PIT	STL
Boston	—	14–8–1	10–12–1	15–7	13–9–1	7–14	15–7	9–12–2
Brooklyn	8–14–1	—	14–8	11–11–1	12–8	13–9	11–11	11–11
Chicago	12–10–1	8–14	—	13–9–2	8–14	7–14	13–9	12–10
Cincinnati	7–15	11–11–1	9–13–2	—	9–13–1	9–13	12–10–1	14–8–1
New York	9–13–1	8–12	14–8	13–9–1	—	7–15–1	8–14	10–12
Philadelphia	14–7	9–13	14–7	13–9	15–7–1	—	10–12	15–7
Pittsburgh	7–15	11–11	9–13	10–12–1	14–8	12–10	—	10–12–1
St. Louis	12–9–2	11–11	10–12	8–14–1	12–10	7–15	12–10–1	—

=== Roster ===
1915 New York Giants
Roster
Pitchers: Rube Benton; Art Fromme; Fred Herbert; Rube Marquard; Christy Mathewson; Emilio Palmero; Pol Perritt; Hank Ritter; Rube Schauer; Ferdie Schupp; Sailor Stroud; Jeff Tesreau	Catchers: Red Dooin; Brad Kocher; Larry McLean; Chief Meyers; Bobby Schang; Harry Smith; Lew Wendell; Infielders: Howard Baker; Fred Brainard; Larry Doyle; Ben Dyer; Art Fletcher; Eddie Grant; George Kelly; Hans Lobert; Fred Merkle	Outfielders: Charlie Babington; Marty Becker; George Burns; Merwin Jacobson; Red Murray; Dave Robertson; Fred Snodgrass; Jim Thorpe	Manager: John McGraw

== Player stats ==
=== Batting ===
==== Starters by position ====
Note: Pos = Position; G = Games played; AB = At bats; H = Hits; Avg. = Batting average; HR = Home runs; RBI = Runs batted in

Pos	Player	G	AB	H	Avg.	HR	RBI
C	Chief Meyers	110	289	67	.232	1	26
1B	Fred Merkle	140	505	151	.299	4	62
2B	Larry Doyle	150	591	189	.320	4	70
SS	Art Fletcher	149	562	143	.254	3	74
3B	Hans Lobert	106	386	97	.251	0	38
OF	Fred Snodgrass	80	252	49	.194	0	20
OF	Dave Robertson	141	544	160	.294	3	58
OF	George Burns	155	622	169	.272	3	51

==== Other batters ====
Note: G = Games played; AB = At bats; H = Hits; Avg. = Batting average; HR = Home runs; RBI = Runs batted in

Player	G	AB	H	Avg.	HR	RBI
Fred Brainard	91	249	50	.201	1	21
Eddie Grant	87	192	40	.208	0	10
Red Murray	45	127	28	.220	3	11
Red Dooin	46	124	27	.218	0	9
Marty Becker	17	52	13	.250	0	3
Jim Thorpe	17	52	12	.231	0	1
High Pockets Kelly	17	38	6	.158	1	4
Lew Wendell	20	36	8	.222	0	5
Charlie Babington	28	33	8	.242	0	2
Larry McLean	13	33	5	.152	0	4
Harry Smith	21	32	4	.125	0	3
Merwin Jacobson	8	24	2	.083	0	0
Bobby Schang	12	21	3	.143	0	1
Ben Dyer	7	19	4	.211	0	0
Brad Kocher	4	11	5	.455	0	2
Howard Baker	1	3	0	.000	0	0

=== Pitching ===
==== Starting pitchers ====
Note: G = Games pitched; IP = Innings pitched; W = Wins; L = Losses; ERA = Earned run average; SO = Strikeouts

Player	G	IP	W	L	ERA	SO
Jeff Tesreau	43	306.0	19	16	2.29	176
Pol Perritt	35	220.0	12	18	2.66	91
Christy Mathewson	27	186.0	8	14	3.58	57
Sailor Stroud	32	184.0	12	9	2.79	62
Rube Marquard	27	169.0	9	8	3.73	79
Fred Herbert	2	17.0	1	1	1.06	6

==== Other pitchers ====
Note: G = Games pitched; IP = Innings pitched; W = Wins; L = Losses; ERA = Earned run average; SO = Strikeouts

Player	G	IP	W	L	ERA	SO
Rube Schauer	32	105.1	2	8	3.50	65
Rube Benton	10	60.2	3	5	2.82	26
Art Fromme	4	12.1	0	1	5.84	4
Emilio Palmero	3	11.2	0	2	3.09	8

==== Relief pitchers ====
Note: G = Games pitched; W = Wins; L = Losses; SV = Saves; ERA = Earned run average; SO = Strikeouts

Player	G	W	L	SV	ERA	SO
Ferdie Schupp	23	1	0	0	5.10	28
Hank Ritter	22	2	1	2	4.63	35

== Awards and honors ==
=== League top five finishers ===
George Burns

- #4 in NL in runs scored (83)

Larry Doyle

- NL leader in batting average (.320)
- #2 in NL in runs scored (86)

Pol Perritt

- #3 in NL in losses (18)

Jeff Tesreau

- #2 in NL in strikeouts (176)
