= List of New York Giants Opening Day starting pitchers =

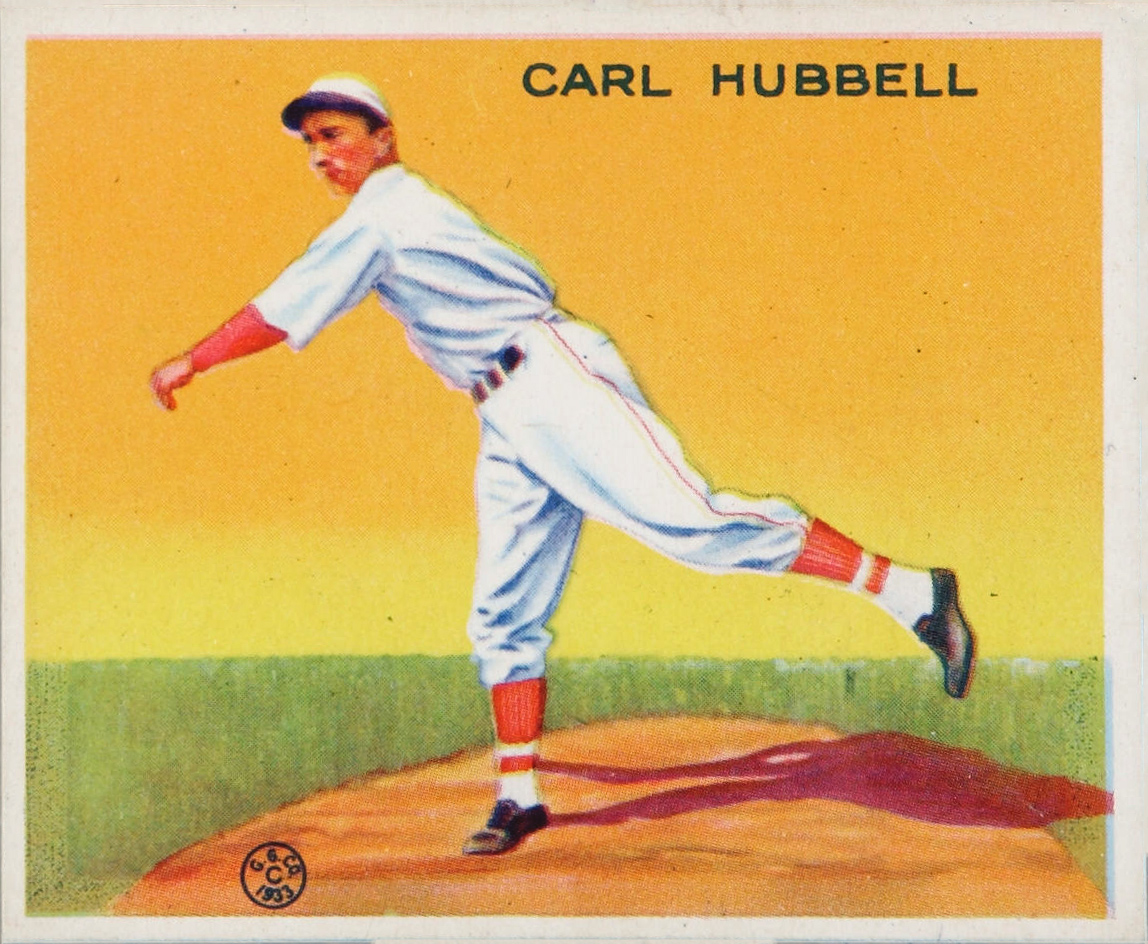
Hall of Famer Carl Hubbell made six Opening Day starts for the Giants.

The New York Giants were a Major League Baseball team that played in Manhattan, New York until moving to San Francisco in 1958. From 1883 until their move to San Francisco, they played their home games at the Polo Grounds. They played in the National League. The first game of the new baseball season for a team is played on Opening Day, and being named the Opening Day starter is an honor, which is often given to the player who is expected to lead the pitching staff that season, though there are various strategic reasons why a team's best pitcher might not start on Opening Day. The Giants used 33 different Opening Day starting pitchers in their 75 seasons they played in New York. The Giants won 39 of those games against 35 losses in those Opening Day starts. They also played one tie game.

Carl Hubbell had the most Opening Day starts for the New York Giants with six between 1929 and 1942. Mickey Welch, Amos Rusie and Larry Jansen each had five Opening Day starts for the team. Christy Mathewson, Red Ames, Jeff Tesreau and Bill Voiselle all had four Opening Day starts apiece for the Giants. Ed Doheny and Johnny Antonelli each had three Opening Day starts for the New York Giants and Antonelli also had an Opening Day start for the San Francisco Giants in 1959, giving him a total of four Opening Day starts for the franchise. Antonelli is the only player to have an Opening Day start for both the New York and San Francisco Giants.

Other pitchers who had multiple Opening Day starts for the New York Giants were Hal Schumacher with three such starts, and Joe McGinnity, Rube Marquard, Jesse Barnes, Art Nehf, Virgil Barnes, Bill Walker and Sal Maglie with two apiece. Seven Hall of Fame pitchers made Opening Day starts for the New York Giants — Welch, Tim Keefe, Rusie, Mathewson, McGinnity, Marquard and Hubbell.

The New York Giants won the modern World Series five times, in 1905, 1921, 1922, 1933 and 1954. Their Opening Day starting pitchers in those years were Joe McGinnity in 1905, Phil Douglas in 1921, Art Nehf in 1922, Carl Hubbell in 1933 and Sal Maglie in 1954. In 1904, the Giants won the National League championship but no World Series was played. Christy Mathewson was the Giants' Opening Day starting pitcher that season. The Giants also won the 19th century World Series twice, in 1888 and 1889. Ledell Titcomb and Mickey Welch were the Giants Opening Day starting pitchers in 1888 and 1889, respectively.

Jesse and Virgil Barnes, who each made two Opening Day starts for the New York Giants, were brothers.

== Key ==
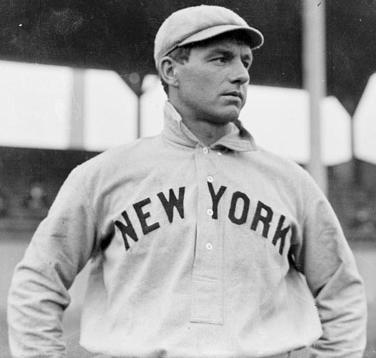
Hall of Famer Joe McGinnity was the Giants' Opening Day starting pitcher in 1905, when the team won its first modern World Series championship.

Season	Each year is linked to an article about that particular Giants season.
W	Win
L	Loss
T	Tie Game; no decision to starting pitcher
ND (W)	No Decision by starting pitcher; Giants won game
ND (L)	No Decision by starting pitcher; Giants lost game
(W)	Giants won game; no information on starting pitcher's decision
(L)	Giants lost game; no information on starting pitcher's decision
(#)	Number of appearances as Opening Day starter
**	NL Champions
#	World Series Champions

== Pitchers ==
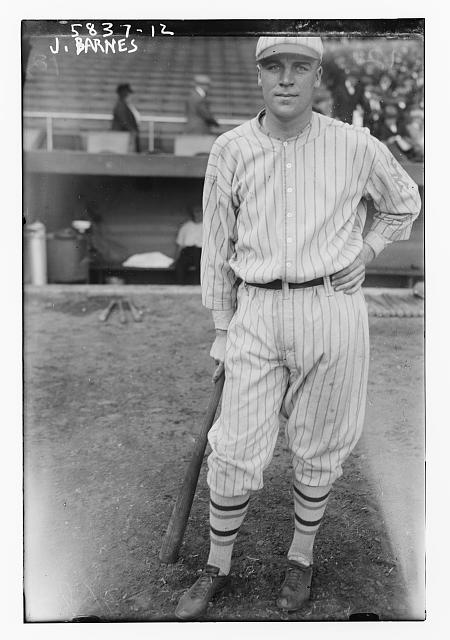
Jesse Barnes was the Giants Opening Day starting pitcher in 1919 and 1920.

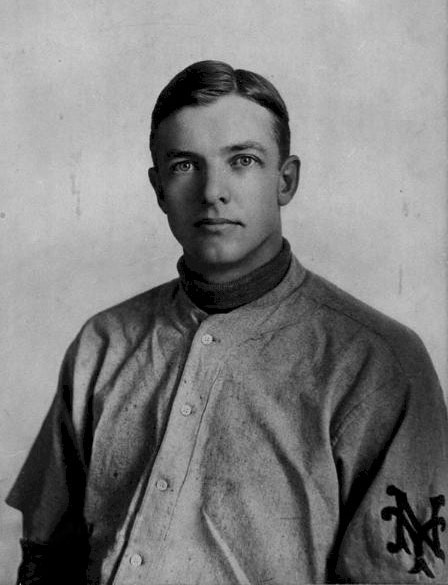
Hall of Famer Christy Mathewson made four Opening Day starts for the Giants.

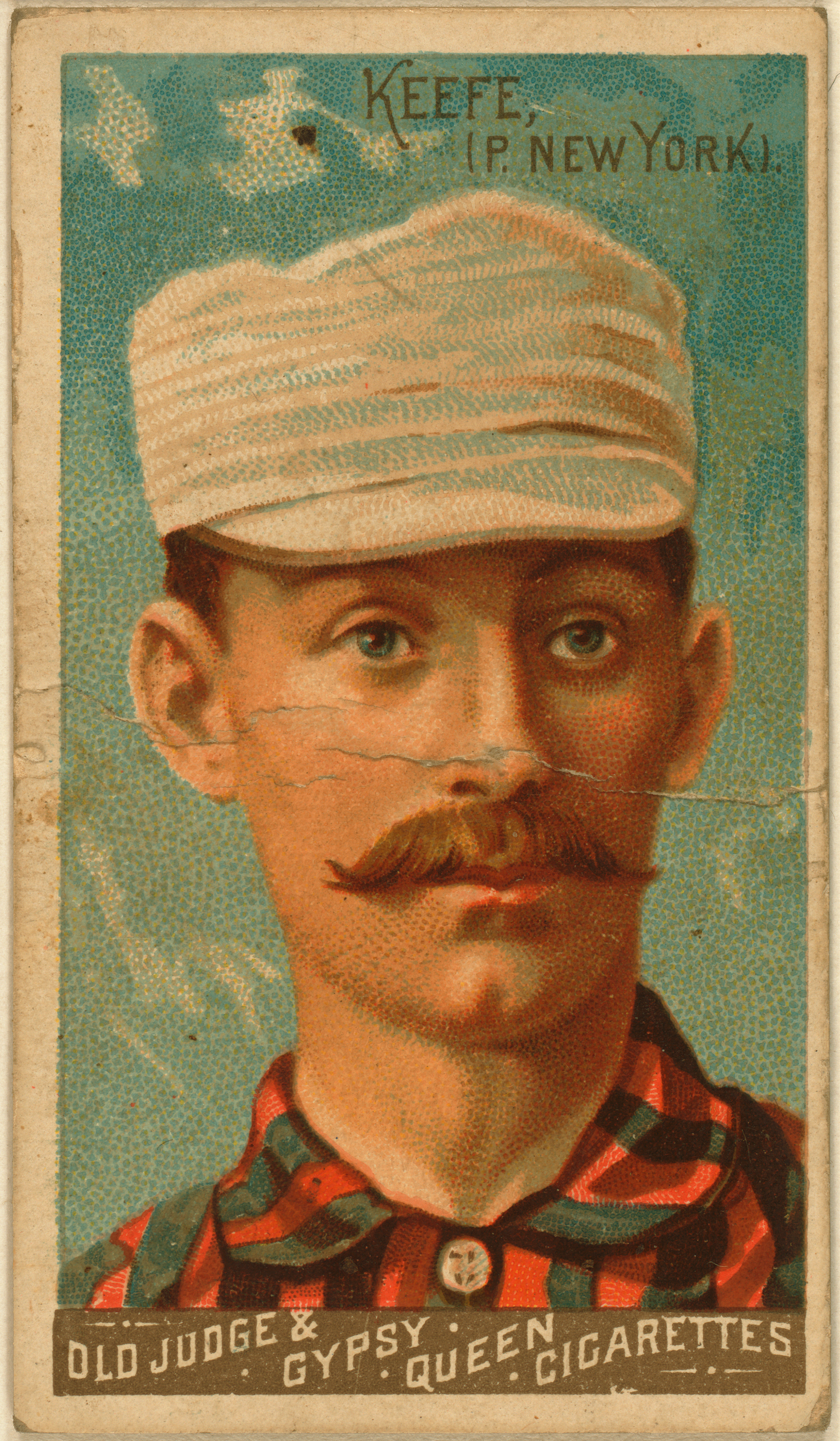
Hall of Famer Tim Keefe was the Giants Opening Day starting pitcher in 1887.

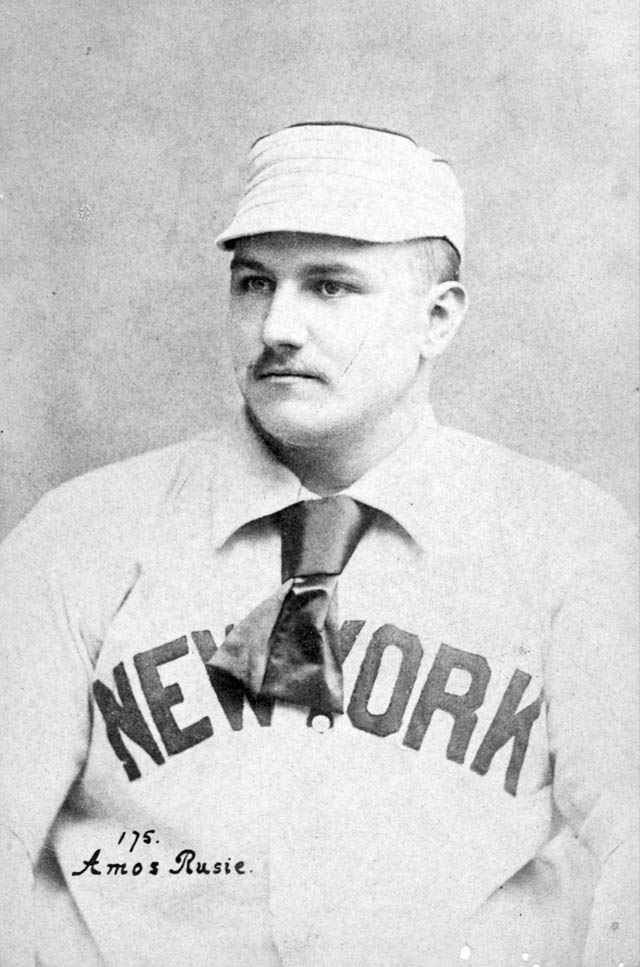
Hall of Famer Amos Rusie made five Opening Day starts for the Giants.

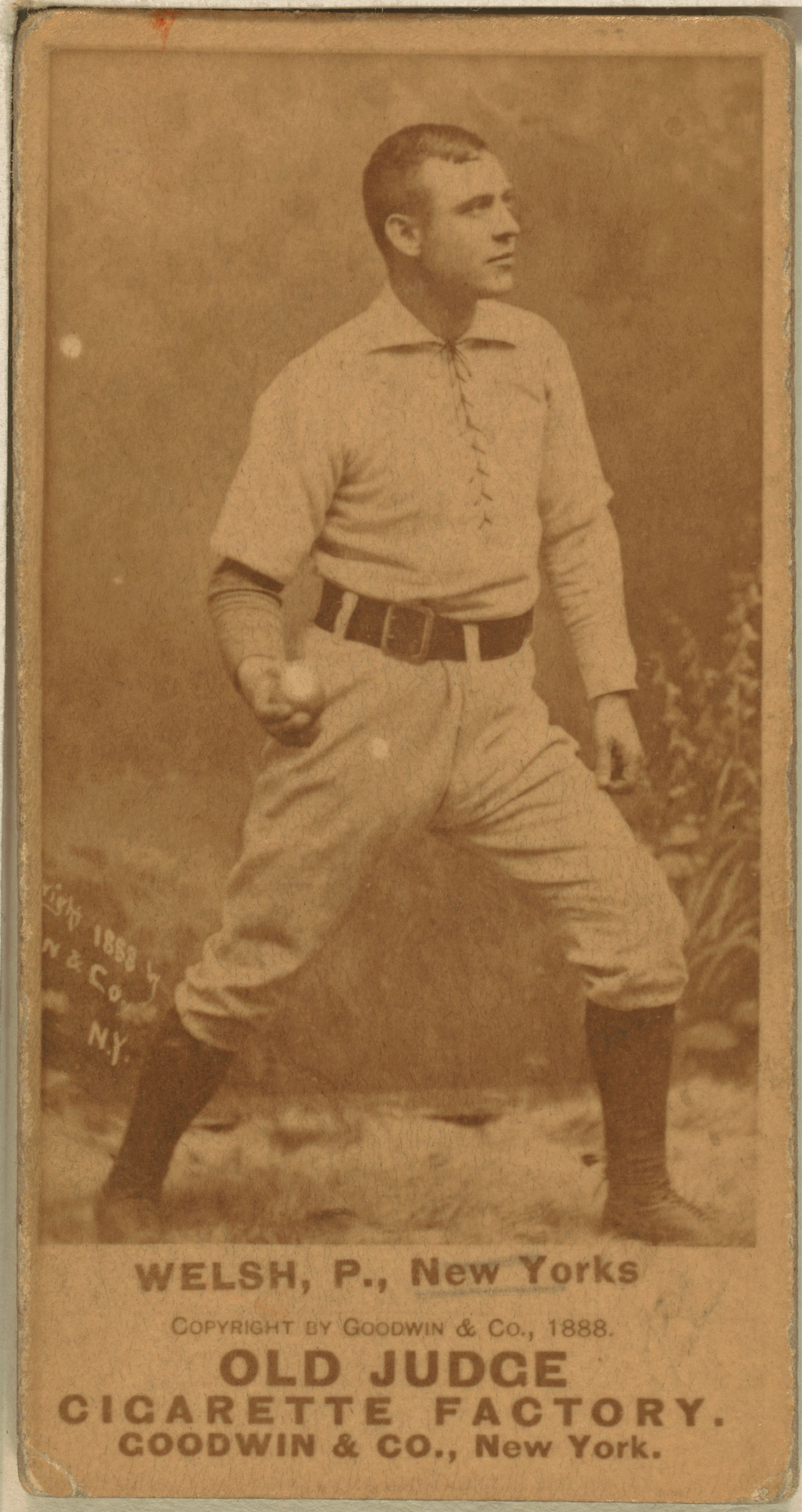
Hall of Famer Mickey Welch made five Opening Day starts for the Giants.

Year	Pitcher	Decision	Opponent	Location	Reference
1883	Mickey Welch	(W)	Boston Beaneaters	Polo Grounds	
1884	Mickey Welch (2)	(W)	Chicago White Stockings	Polo Grounds	
1885	Mickey Welch (3)	(W)	Boston Beaneaters	Polo Grounds	
1886	Mickey Welch (4)	(W)	Boston Beaneaters	Polo Grounds	
1887	Tim Keefe	(W)	Philadelphia Phillies	Polo Grounds	
1888#	Ledell Titcomb	(W)	Washington Nationals	Swampoodle Grounds	
1889#	Mickey Welch (5)	(L)	Boston Beaneaters	Oakland Park, New Jersey	
1890	Amos Rusie	(L)	Philadelphia Phillies	Polo Grounds	
1891	Amos Rusie (2)	(L)	Boston Beaneaters	South End Grounds	
1892	Amos Rusie (3)	(W)	Philadelphia Phillies	Huntingdon Grounds	
1893	Silver King	(L)	Boston Beaneaters	Polo Grounds	
1894	Amos Rusie (4)	(L)	Baltimore Orioles	Union Park	
1895	Amos Rusie (5)	(L)	Brooklyn Bridegrooms	Polo Grounds	
1896	Dad Clarke	(L)	Washington Nationals	Boundary Field	
1897	Ed Doheny	(L)	Philadelphia Phillies	Baker Bowl	
1898	Ed Doheny (2)	(L)	Boston Beaneaters	Polo Grounds	
1899	Ed Doheny (3)	(L)	Baltimore Orioles	Union Park	
1900	Bill Carrick	(L)	Brooklyn Superbas	Polo Grounds	
1901	Dummy Taylor	(L)	Boston Braves	South End Grounds	
1902	Christy Mathewson	(W)	Philadelphia Phillies	Polo Grounds	
1903	Christy Mathewson (2)	(L)	Brooklyn Dodgers	Polo Grounds	
1904**	Christy Mathewson (3)	(W)	Brooklyn Dodgers	Washington Park	
1905#	Joe McGinnity	(W)	Boston Beaneaters	Polo Grounds	
1906	Red Ames	(W)	Philadelphia Phillies	Baker Bowl	
1907	Joe McGinnity (2)	(L)	Philadelphia Phillies	Polo Grounds	
1908	Christy Mathewson (4)	(W)	Philadelphia Phillies	Baker Bowl	
1909	Red Ames (2)	(L)	Brooklyn Dodgers	Polo Grounds	
1910	Red Ames (3)	(L)	Boston Doves	South End Grounds	
1911**	Red Ames (4)	L	Philadelphia Phillies	Polo Grounds	
1912**	Rube Marquard	(W)	Brooklyn Dodgers	Washington Park	
1913**	Jeff Tesreau	(L)	Boston Braves	Polo Grounds	
1914	Rube Marquard (2)	(L)	Philadelphia Phillies	Baker Bowl	
1915	Jeff Tesreau (2)	(W)	Brooklyn Dodgers	Polo Grounds	
1916	Jeff Tesreau (3)	(W)	Philadelphia Phillies	Baker Bowl	
1917**	Fred Anderson	(W)	Boston Braves	Braves Field	
1918	Jeff Tesreau (4)	ND (W)	Brooklyn Dodgers	Polo Grounds	
1919	Jesse Barnes	W	Philadelphia Phillies	Baker Bowl	
1920	Jesse Barnes (2)	L	Boston Braves	Polo Grounds	
1921#	Phil Douglas	ND (W)	Philadelphia Phillies	Baker Bowl	
1922#	Art Nehf	L	Brooklyn Dodgers	Polo Grounds	
1923**	Hugh McQuillan	W	Boston Braves	Braves Field	
1924**	Rosy Ryan	L	Brooklyn Dodgers	Ebbets Field	
1925	Art Nehf (2)	L	Boston Braves	Braves Field	
1926	Virgil Barnes	L	Brooklyn Dodgers	Polo Grounds	
1927	Virgil Barnes (2)	W	Philadelphia Phillies	Baker Bowl	
1928	Larry Benton	W	Boston Braves	Polo Grounds	
1929	Carl Hubbell	W	Philadelphia Phillies	Baker Bowl	
1930	Bill Walker	W	Boston Braves	Polo Grounds	
1931	Freddie Fitzsimmons	W	Philadelphia Phillies	Baker Bowl	
1932	Bill Walker (2)	L	Philadelphia Phillies	Polo Grounds	
1933#	Carl Hubbell (2)	T	Brooklyn Dodgers	Ebbets Field	
1934	Carl Hubbell (3)	W	Philadelphia Phillies	Polo Grounds	
1935	Carl Hubbell (4)	L	Boston Braves	Braves Field	
1936**	Hal Schumacher	ND (W)	Brooklyn Dodgers	Polo Grounds	
1937**	Hal Schumacher (2)	W	Brooklyn Dodgers	Ebbets Field	
1938	Cliff Melton	W	Boston Bees	Polo Grounds	
1939	Harry Gumbert	W	Brooklyn Dodgers	Ebbets Field	
1940	Carl Hubbell (5)	L	Philadelphia Phillies	Polo Grounds	
1941	Hal Schumacher (3)	ND (W)	Brooklyn Dodgers	Ebbets Field	
1942	Carl Hubbell (6)	L	Brooklyn Dodgers	Polo Grounds	
1943	Bill Lohrman	L	Brooklyn Dodgers	Ebbets Field	
1944	Bill Voiselle	W	Boston Braves	Polo Grounds	
1945	Bill Voiselle (2)	W	Boston Braves	Braves Field	
1946	Bill Voiselle (3)	W	Philadelphia Phillies	Polo Grounds	
1947	Bill Voiselle (4)	L	Philadelphia Phillies	Shibe Park	
1948	Larry Jansen	L	Brooklyn Dodgers	Polo Grounds	
1949	Larry Jansen (2)	L	Brooklyn Dodgers	Ebbets Field	
1950	Larry Jansen (3)	L	Boston Braves	Polo Grounds	
1951**	Larry Jansen (4)	W	Boston Braves	Braves Field	
1952	Sal Maglie	W	Philadelphia Phillies	Polo Grounds	
1953	Larry Jansen (5)	W	Philadelphia Phillies	Shibe Park	
1954#	Sal Maglie (2)	W	Brooklyn Dodgers	Polo Grounds	
1955	Johnny Antonelli	L	Philadelphia Phillies	Baker Bowl	
1956	Johnny Antonelli (2)	W	Pittsburgh Pirates	Polo Grounds	
1957	Johnny Antonelli (3)	L	Pittsburgh Pirates	Forbes Field	
