= 1915 Boston Braves season =

1915 Boston Braves
- League: National League
- Ballpark: Fenway Park (since 1914); Braves Field
- City: Boston, Massachusetts
- Record: 83–69 (.546)
- League place: 2nd
- Owners: James Gaffney
- Managers: George Stallings

The 1915 Boston Braves season was the 45th season of the franchise. The Braves finished second in the National League with a record of 83 wins and 69 losses, seven games behind the National League champion Philadelphia Phillies. The 1915 season was notable for the opening of Braves Field on August 13, the last of the National League's "jewel box" stadiums to be built. (Weeghman Park in Chicago, while opened in 1914, would not be occupied by the Cubs until the next season.) Prior to the opening of Braves Field, the Braves had played in Fenway Park for the first half of the 1915 season and the last 27 games of the 1914 season, having left their only previous home, South End Grounds, on August 11, 1914.

In the final game of the season, a 15–8 loss to the New York Giants, Joe Shannon made his final Major League appearance, and Red Shannon made his first Major League appearance. The two were twins, marking the first of three times that twins played on the same team (along with Eddie and Johnny O'Brien and Jose and Ozzie Canseco).

== Offseason ==
- February 14, 1915: Oscar Dugey, Possum Whitted, and cash were traded by the Braves to the Philadelphia Phillies for Sherry Magee.

== Regular season ==
=== Season standings ===
National League
Team	W	L	Pct.	GB	Home	Road
Philadelphia Phillies	90	62	.592	—	49‍–‍27	41‍–‍35
Boston Braves	83	69	.546	7	49‍–‍27	34‍–‍42
Brooklyn Robins	80	72	.526	10	51‍–‍26	29‍–‍46
Chicago Cubs	73	80	.477	17½	42‍–‍34	31‍–‍46
Pittsburgh Pirates	73	81	.474	18	40‍–‍37	33‍–‍44
St. Louis Cardinals	72	81	.471	18½	42‍–‍36	30‍–‍45
Cincinnati Reds	71	83	.461	20	39‍–‍37	32‍–‍46
New York Giants	69	83	.454	21	37‍–‍38	32‍–‍45

=== Record vs. opponents ===
1915 National League record Sources:
Team	BSN	BRO	CHI	CIN	NYG	PHI	PIT	STL
Boston	—	14–8–1	10–12–1	15–7	13–9–1	7–14	15–7	9–12–2
Brooklyn	8–14–1	—	14–8	11–11–1	12–8	13–9	11–11	11–11
Chicago	12–10–1	8–14	—	13–9–2	8–14	7–14	13–9	12–10
Cincinnati	7–15	11–11–1	9–13–2	—	9–13–1	9–13	12–10–1	14–8–1
New York	9–13–1	8–12	14–8	13–9–1	—	7–15–1	8–14	10–12
Philadelphia	14–7	9–13	14–7	13–9	15–7–1	—	10–12	15–7
Pittsburgh	7–15	11–11	9–13	10–12–1	14–8	12–10	—	10–12–1
St. Louis	12–9–2	11–11	10–12	8–14–1	12–10	7–15	12–10–1	—

=== Roster ===
1915 Boston Braves
Roster
Pitchers: Jesse Barnes; Gene Cocreham; Dick Crutcher; George Davis; Otto Hess; Tom Hughes; Bill James; Dolf Luque; Art Nehf; Pat Ragan; Dick Rudolph; Paul Strand; Lefty Tyler	Catchers: Earl Blackburn; Hank Gowdy; Walt Tragesser; Bert Whaling; Infielders: Johnny Evers; Ed Fitzpatrick; Fletcher Low; Rabbit Maranville; Butch Schmidt; Red Shannon; Red Smith	Outfielders: Ted Cather; Zip Collins; Pete Compton; Joe Connolly; Dick Egan; Larry Gilbert; Sherry Magee; Herbie Moran; Joe Shannon; Fred Snodgrass	Manager: George Stallings

== Player stats ==
=== Batting ===
==== Starters by position ====
Note: Pos = Position; G = Games played; AB = At bats; H = Hits; Avg. = Batting average; HR = Home runs; RBI = Runs batted in

Pos	Player	G	AB	H	Avg.	HR	RBI
C	Hank Gowdy	118	316	78	.247	2	30
1B	Butch Schmidt	127	458	115	.251	2	60
2B	Johnny Evers	83	278	73	.263	1	22
SS	Rabbit Maranville	149	509	124	.244	2	43
3B	Red Smith	157	549	145	.264	2	65
OF	Herbie Moran	130	419	84	.200	0	21
OF	Sherry Magee	156	571	160	.280	2	87
OF	Joe Connolly	104	305	91	.298	0	23

==== Other batters ====
Note: G = Games played; AB = At bats; H = Hits; Avg. = Batting average; HR = Home runs; RBI = Runs batted in

Player	G	AB	H	Avg.	HR	RBI
Ed Fitzpatrick	105	303	67	.221	0	24
Dick Egan	83	220	57	.259	0	21
Bert Whaling	72	190	42	.221	0	13
Pete Compton	35	116	28	.241	1	12
Larry Gilbert	45	106	16	.151	0	4
Ted Cather	40	102	21	.206	2	18
Fred Snodgrass	23	79	22	.278	0	9
Zip Collins	5	14	4	.286	0	0
Joe Shannon	5	10	2	.200	0	1
Walt Tragesser	7	7	0	.000	0	0
Earl Blackburn	3	6	1	.167	0	0
Fletcher Low	1	4	1	.250	0	1
Red Shannon	3	3	0	.000	0	0

=== Pitching ===
==== Starting pitchers ====
Note: G = Games pitched; IP = Innings pitched; W = Wins; L = Losses; ERA = Earned run average; SO = Strikeouts

Player	G	IP	W	L	ERA	SO
Dick Rudolph	44	341.1	22	19	2.37	147
Pat Ragan	33	227.0	16	12	2.46	81
Lefty Tyler	32	204.2	10	9	2.86	89
Art Nehf	12	78.1	5	4	2.53	39

==== Other pitchers ====
Note: G = Games pitched; IP = Innings pitched; W = Wins; L = Losses; ERA = Earned run average; SO = Strikeouts

Player	G	IP	W	L	ERA	SO
Tom Hughes	50	280.1	16	14	2.12	171
George Davis	15	73.1	3	3	3.80	26
Bill James	13	68.1	5	4	3.03	23
Jesse Barnes	9	45.1	3	0	1.39	16
Dick Crutcher	14	43.2	2	2	4.33	17
Paul Strand	6	22.2	1	1	2.38	13
Otto Hess	4	14.0	0	1	3.86	5
Dolf Luque	2	5.0	0	0	3.60	3

==== Relief pitchers ====
Note: G = Games pitched; W = Wins; L = Losses; SV = Saves; ERA = Earned run average; SO = Strikeouts

Player	G	W	L	SV	ERA	SO
Gene Cocreham	1	0	0	0	5.40	0
