= Ed Schorr =

American baseball player (1892–1969)

- Pitcher
- Born: February 16, 1892; Logan, Ohio
- Died: September 12, 1969 (aged 77); Atlantic City, New Jersey
- Batted: Right Threw: Right

MLB debut
- April 26, 1915, for the Chicago Cubs

Last MLB appearance
- September 23, 1915, for the Chicago Cubs

MLB statistics
- Games: 2
- Innings pitched: 6.0
- Strikeouts: 3
- Stats at Baseball Reference

Teams
- Chicago Cubs (1915)

Edward Walter Schorr (February 16, 1892 – September 12, 1969) was an American Major League Baseball pitcher who played for the Chicago Cubs in 1915.
