= John Fluhrer =

American baseball player (1894–1946)

- Left fielder
- Born: January 3, 1894; Adrian, Michigan
- Died: July 17, 1946 (aged 52); Columbus, Ohio
- Batted: Right Threw: Right

MLB debut
- September 5, 1915, for the Chicago Cubs

Last MLB appearance
- September 24, 1915, for the Chicago Cubs

MLB statistics
- Games played: 6
- At bats: 6
- Hits: 2
- Stats at Baseball Reference

Teams
- Chicago Cubs (1915)

John Lester Fluhrer (January 3, 1894 – July 17, 1946) was a Major League Baseball left fielder who played for the Chicago Cubs in 1915.
