= Joe Shannon (baseball) =

American baseball player (1897-1955)

Joseph Shannon
- Second baseman / Outfielder
- Born: February 11, 1897; Jersey City, New Jersey, U.S.
- Died: July 20, 1955 (aged 58); Jersey City, New Jersey, U.S.
- Batted: right Threw: right

MLB debut
- June 30, 1915, for the Boston Braves

Last MLB appearance
- October 7, 1915, for the Boston Braves

MLB statistics
- Batting average: .200
- Hits: 2
- Runs: 3
- Home runs: 0
- Runs batted in: 1
- Stats at Baseball Reference

Teams
- Boston Braves (1915)

Joseph Aloysius Shannon (February 11, 1897 – July 20, 1955) was an American Major League Baseball second baseman and outfielder who played five games for the Boston Braves in 1915. He is the twin brother of Red Shannon, and both played on the Braves in the 1915 season. They played together in only one game, on October 7, 1915, Red's first-ever major league game, and Joe's last.
