= 1915 St. Louis Cardinals season =

Major League Baseball season

1915 St. Louis Cardinals
- League: National League
- Ballpark: Robison Field
- City: St. Louis, Missouri
- Record: 72–81 (.471)
- League place: 6th
- Owners: Helene Hathaway Britton
- Managers: Miller Huggins

The 1915 St. Louis Cardinals season was the team's 34th season in St. Louis, Missouri and the 24th season in the National League. The Cardinals went 72–81 during the season and finished sixth in the National League. The legendary Rogers Hornsby made his National League debut on September 10.

== Regular season ==
=== Season standings ===
National League
Team	W	L	Pct.	GB	Home	Road
Philadelphia Phillies	90	62	.592	—	49‍–‍27	41‍–‍35
Boston Braves	83	69	.546	7	49‍–‍27	34‍–‍42
Brooklyn Robins	80	72	.526	10	51‍–‍26	29‍–‍46
Chicago Cubs	73	80	.477	17½	42‍–‍34	31‍–‍46
Pittsburgh Pirates	73	81	.474	18	40‍–‍37	33‍–‍44
St. Louis Cardinals	72	81	.471	18½	42‍–‍36	30‍–‍45
Cincinnati Reds	71	83	.461	20	39‍–‍37	32‍–‍46
New York Giants	69	83	.454	21	37‍–‍38	32‍–‍45

=== Record vs. opponents ===
1915 National League record Sources:
Team	BSN	BRO	CHI	CIN	NYG	PHI	PIT	STL
Boston	—	14–8–1	10–12–1	15–7	13–9–1	7–14	15–7	9–12–2
Brooklyn	8–14–1	—	14–8	11–11–1	12–8	13–9	11–11	11–11
Chicago	12–10–1	8–14	—	13–9–2	8–14	7–14	13–9	12–10
Cincinnati	7–15	11–11–1	9–13–2	—	9–13–1	9–13	12–10–1	14–8–1
New York	9–13–1	8–12	14–8	13–9–1	—	7–15–1	8–14	10–12
Philadelphia	14–7	9–13	14–7	13–9	15–7–1	—	10–12	15–7
Pittsburgh	7–15	11–11	9–13	10–12–1	14–8	12–10	—	10–12–1
St. Louis	12–9–2	11–11	10–12	8–14–1	12–10	7–15	12–10–1	—

=== Notable transactions ===
- September 12, 1915: Jim Brown was acquired by the Cardinals from the Topeka Jayhawks.

=== Roster ===
1915 St. Louis Cardinals
Roster
Pitchers: Red Ames; Charlie Boardman; Bill Doak; Dan Griner; Fred Lamlein; Lee Meadows; Dick Niehaus; Hub Perdue; Hank Robinson; Slim Sallee	Catchers: Harry Glenn; Mike González; Jack Roche; Frank Snyder; Infielders: Zinn Beck; Bruno Betzel; Art Butler; Rolla Daringer; Rogers Hornsby; Miller Huggins; Ham Hyatt; Dots Miller	Outfielders: Bob Bescher; Jim Brown; Cozy Dolan; Tom Long; Jack Smith; Chief Wilson	Manager: Miller Huggins; Coaches: Charley O'Leary

== Player stats ==
=== Batting ===
==== Starters by position ====
Note: Pos = Position; G = Games played; AB = At bats; H = Hits; Avg. = Batting average; HR = Home runs; RBI = Runs batted in

Pos	Player	G	AB	H	Avg.	HR	RBI
C	Frank Snyder	144	473	141	.298	2	55
1B	Dots Miller	150	553	146	.264	2	72
2B	Miller Huggins	107	353	85	.241	2	24
SS	Art Butler	130	469	119	.254	1	31
3B	Bruno Betzel	117	367	92	.251	0	27
OF	Bob Bescher	130	486	128	.263	4	34
OF	Tom Long	140	507	149	.294	2	61
OF	Chief Wilson	107	348	96	.276	3	39

==== Other batters ====
Note: G = Games played; AB = At bats; H = Hits; Avg. = Batting average; HR = Home runs; RBI = Runs batted in

Player	G	AB	H	Avg.	HR	RBI
Cozy Dolan	111	322	90	.280	2	38
Ham Hyatt	106	295	79	.268	2	46
Zinn Beck	70	223	52	.233	0	15
Mike González	51	97	22	.227	0	10
Rogers Hornsby	18	57	14	.246	0	4
Jack Roche	46	39	8	.205	0	6
Rolla Daringer	10	23	2	.087	0	0
Harry Glenn	6	16	5	.313	0	1
Jack Smith	4	16	3	.188	0	0
Jim Brown	1	2	1	.500	0	0

=== Pitching ===
==== Starting pitchers ====
Note: G = Games pitched; IP = Innings pitched; W = Wins; L = Losses; ERA = Earned run average; SO = Strikeouts

Player	G	IP	W	L	ERA	SO
Bill Doak	38	276.0	16	18	2.64	124
Slim Sallee	46	275.1	13	17	2.84	91
Lee Meadows	39	244.0	13	11	2.99	104
Red Ames	15	113.1	9	3	2.46	48

==== Other pitchers ====
Note: G = Games pitched; IP = Innings pitched; W = Wins; L = Losses; ERA = Earned run average; SO = Strikeouts

Player	G	IP	W	L	ERA	SO
Dan Griner	37	150.1	5	11	2.81	46
Hank Robinson	32	143.0	7	8	2.45	57
Hub Perdue	31	115.1	6	12	4.21	29
Dick Niehaus	15	45.1	2	1	3.97	21
Charlie Boardman	3	19.0	1	0	2.84	7

==== Relief pitchers ====
Note: G = Games pitched; W = Wins; L = Losses; SV = Saves; ERA = Earned run average; SO = Strikeouts

Player	G	W	L	SV	ERA	SO
Fred Lamlein	4	0	0	0	1.42	11
