= Charlie Babington =

American baseball player (1895–1957)

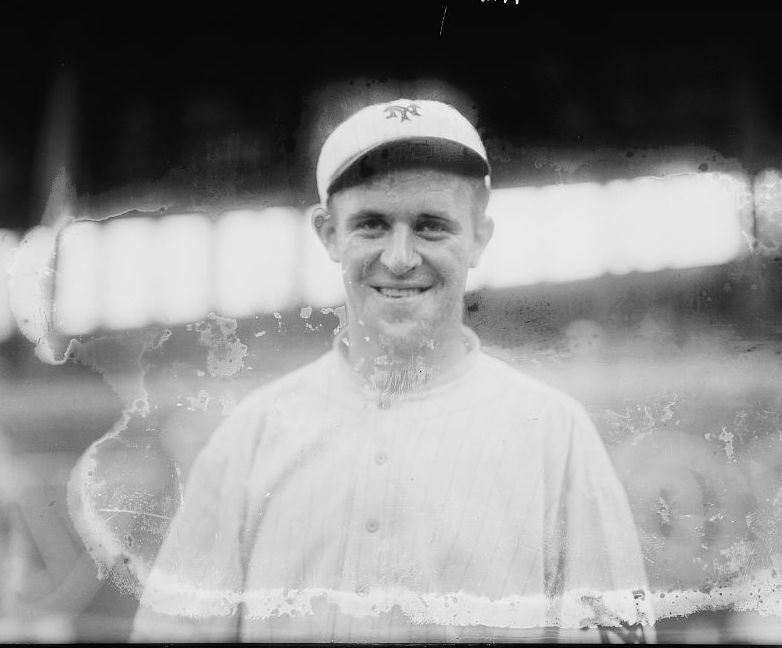
- Center fielder
- Born: May 4, 1895; Cranston, Rhode Island
- Died: March 2, 1957 (aged 61); Providence, Rhode Island
- Batted: Right Threw: Right

MLB debut
- July 20, 1915, for the New York Giants

Last MLB appearance
- September 26, 1915, for the New York Giants

MLB statistics
- Batting average: .242
- Home runs: 0
- Runs batted in: 2
- Stats at Baseball Reference

Teams
- New York Giants (1915)

Charles Percy Babington (May 4, 1895 – March 22, 1957) was a Major League Baseball center fielder who played for the New York Giants in 1915.
