= Jim Brown (outfielder) =

American baseball player (1897–1944)

- Outfielder
- Born: March 31, 1897; Laurel, Maryland, U.S.
- Died: October 22, 1944 (aged 47); Bradwood, Oregon, U.S.
- Batted: Right Threw: Right

MLB debut
- September 13, 1915, for the St. Louis Cardinals

Last MLB appearance
- September 22, 1916, for the Philadelphia Athletics

MLB statistics
- Batting average: .250
- Home runs: 1
- Runs batted in: 5
- Stats at Baseball Reference

Teams
- St. Louis Cardinals (1915); Philadelphia Athletics (1916)

James Donaldson Brown (March 31, 1897 – October 22, 1944) was an American professional baseball player. He played parts of two seasons in Major League Baseball, 1915 for the St. Louis Cardinals and 1916 for the Philadelphia Athletics, primarily as an outfielder.

According to the May/June 2010 Report of the Biographical Research Committee for the Society for American Baseball Research, after his baseball career, Brown was listed in the Los Angeles city directories at various times as a ballplayer, actor, and studio worker. He died October 22, 1944, in Bradwood, Oregon. The death certificate said that he was a resident of Hollywood, worked as a carpenter for a movie firm, and that he had been in Oregon for two months. He was buried in Greenwood Cemetery, Astoria, Oregon.
