= 1915 Pittsburgh Pirates season =

1915 Pittsburgh Pirates
- League: National League
- Ballpark: Forbes Field
- City: Pittsburgh, Pennsylvania
- Owners: Barney Dreyfuss
- Managers: Fred Clarke

The 1915 Pittsburgh Pirates season was the 34th season of the Pittsburgh Pirates franchise; the 29th in the National League. The Pirates finished fifth in the league standings with a record of 73–81.

== Regular season ==
=== Season standings ===
National League
Team	W	L	Pct.	GB	Home	Road
Philadelphia Phillies	90	62	.592	—	49‍–‍27	41‍–‍35
Boston Braves	83	69	.546	7	49‍–‍27	34‍–‍42
Brooklyn Robins	80	72	.526	10	51‍–‍26	29‍–‍46
Chicago Cubs	73	80	.477	17½	42‍–‍34	31‍–‍46
Pittsburgh Pirates	73	81	.474	18	40‍–‍37	33‍–‍44
St. Louis Cardinals	72	81	.471	18½	42‍–‍36	30‍–‍45
Cincinnati Reds	71	83	.461	20	39‍–‍37	32‍–‍46
New York Giants	69	83	.454	21	37‍–‍38	32‍–‍45

=== Record vs. opponents ===
1915 National League record Sources:
Team	BSN	BRO	CHI	CIN	NYG	PHI	PIT	STL
Boston	—	14–8–1	10–12–1	15–7	13–9–1	7–14	15–7	9–12–2
Brooklyn	8–14–1	—	14–8	11–11–1	12–8	13–9	11–11	11–11
Chicago	12–10–1	8–14	—	13–9–2	8–14	7–14	13–9	12–10
Cincinnati	7–15	11–11–1	9–13–2	—	9–13–1	9–13	12–10–1	14–8–1
New York	9–13–1	8–12	14–8	13–9–1	—	7–15–1	8–14	10–12
Philadelphia	14–7	9–13	14–7	13–9	15–7–1	—	10–12	15–7
Pittsburgh	7–15	11–11	9–13	10–12–1	14–8	12–10	—	10–12–1
St. Louis	12–9–2	11–11	10–12	8–14–1	12–10	7–15	12–10–1	—

=== Game log ===
1915 Game Log: 73–81 (Home: 40–37; Away: 33–44)
April: 5–9 (Home: 1–2; Away: 4–7)

#	Date	Opponent	Score	Win	Loss	Save	Attendance	Record
1	April 14	@ Reds	9–2	**McQuillan** (1–0)	Ames	—	24,000	1–0
2	April 15	@ Reds	1–2	Benton	**Harmon** (0–1)	—	3,000	1–1
3	April 16	@ Reds	2–4	Douglas	**Vance** (0–1)	Dale	—	1–2
4	April 17	@ Reds	3–2	**Mamaux** (1–0)	Brown	—	—	2–2
5	April 18	@ Cubs	1–2 (10)	Vaughn	**Cooper** (0–1)	—	—	2–3
6	April 19	@ Cubs	7–8	Pierce	**Harmon** (0–2)	—	—	2–4
7	April 20	@ Cubs	8–6	**Mamaux** (2–0)	Cheney	**McQuillan** (1)	2,000	3–4
8	April 22	Reds	8–2	**Adams** (1–0)	Douglas	—	—	4–4
9	April 23	Reds	1–2	Dale	**Cooper** (0–2)	Benton	2,500	4–5
10	April 24	Reds	1–1 (8)			—	10,000	4–5
11	April 25	@ Cardinals	1–8	Doak	**Kantlehner** (0–1)	—	12,000	4–6
12	April 26	@ Cardinals	0–3	Perdue	**Adams** (1–1)	—	—	4–7
13	April 27	@ Cardinals	0–3	Griner	**Mamaux** (2–1)	—	—	4–8
14	April 28	@ Cardinals	7–6 (8)	**Harmon** (1–2)	Sallee	**Cooper** (1)	—	5–8
15	April 30	Cubs	1–4	Zabel	**Cooper** (0–3)	—	—	5–9

May: 13–10 (Home: 7–2; Away: 6–8)

#	Date	Opponent	Score	Win	Loss	Save	Attendance	Record
16	May 1	Cubs	1–3	Standridge	**Adams** (1–2)	—	2,000	5–10
17	May 2	@ Cubs	1–7 (8)	Vaughn	**McQuillan** (1–1)	—	—	5–11
18	May 3	@ Cubs	1–5 (5)	Pierce	**Cooper** (0–4)	Humphries	—	5–12
19	May 4	Cardinals	4–3 (8)	**Harmon** (2–2)	Perdue	—	—	6–12
20	May 6	Cardinals	9–3	**Adams** (2–2)	Meadows	—	—	7–12
21	May 7	Cardinals	6–4	**McQuillan** (2–1)	Doak	—	—	8–12
22	May 8	Cardinals	3–2	**Mamaux** (3–1)	Robinson	—	—	9–12
23	May 9	@ Reds	8–3	**Harmon** (3–2)	Douglas	—	—	10–12
24	May 10	Cubs	10–7	**Conzelman** (1–0)	Zabel	**Adams** (1)	—	11–12
25	May 11	@ Phillies	2–4	Alexander	**McQuillan** (2–2)	—	—	11–13
26	May 13	@ Phillies	3–1	**Harmon** (4–2)	Demaree	—	—	12–13
27	May 14	@ Phillies	3–5	Rixey	**Adams** (2–3)	Mayer	—	12–14
28	May 15	@ Braves	10–6	**Cooper** (1–4)	Rudolph	**McQuillan** (2)	—	13–14
29	May 18	@ Braves	2–3	James	**Harmon** (4–3)	—	—	13–15
30	May 19	@ Braves	7–0	**Mamaux** (4–1)	Ragan	—	—	14–15
31	May 20	@ Giants	6–2	**Adams** (3–3)	Perritt	—	—	15–15
32	May 25	@ Robins	1–5	Pfeffer	**McQuillan** (2–3)	—	—	15–16
33	May 27	@ Robins	0–2	Dell	**Cooper** (1–5)	—	—	15–17
34	May 28	@ Robins	3–1	**Mamaux** (5–1)	Coombs	—	—	16–17
35	May 29	Cardinals	0–0 (5)			—	—	16–17
36	May 29	Cardinals	3–5	Meadows	**McQuillan** (2–4)	—	—	16–18
37	May 30	@ Reds	0–4	Schneider	**Harmon** (4–4)	—	—	16–19
38	May 31	Cubs	1–0	**Cooper** (2–5)	Lavender	—	—	17–19
39	May 31	Cubs	1–0	**Mamaux** (6–1)	Cheney	—	15,000	18–19

June: 13–9 (Home: 9–7; Away: 4–2)

#	Date	Opponent	Score	Win	Loss	Save	Attendance	Record
40	June 1	Cubs	0–2	Zabel	**Adams** (3–4)	—	—	18–20
41	June 4	Robins	2–8	Pfeffer	**Cooper** (2–6)	—	—	18–21
42	June 5	Robins	11–0	**Mamaux** (7–1)	Dell	—	5,000	19–21
43	June 7	Robins	6–1	**Adams** (4–4)	Coombs	—	—	20–21
44	June 8	Robins	3–4	Smith	**McQuillan** (2–5)	Pfeffer	1,800	20–22
45	June 9	Braves	7–3	**Mamaux** (8–1)	Tyler	—	—	21–22
46	June 10	Braves	2–1	**Harmon** (5–4)	Hughes	—	—	22–22
47	June 12	Braves	2–8	Ragan	**Adams** (4–5)	—	—	22–23
48	June 14	Phillies	1–4 (11)	Alexander	**Mamaux** (8–2)	—	3,500	22–24
49	June 16	Phillies	2–1	**Harmon** (6–4)	Chalmers	—	—	23–24
50	June 17	Giants	1–3	Marquard	**McQuillan** (2–6)	—	—	23–25
51	June 18	Giants	7–5	**Mamaux** (9–2)	Perritt	**Adams** (2)	—	24–25
52	June 19	Giants	4–0	**Harmon** (7–4)	Tesreau	—	—	25–25
53	June 21	Phillies	4–3 (13)	**Mamaux** (10–2)	Rixey	—	—	26–25
54	June 22	@ Reds	3–1	**McQuillan** (3–6)	Schneider	—	—	27–25
55	June 23	@ Reds	6–2	**Harmon** (8–4)	Benton	—	—	28–25
56	June 24	Reds	3–5	Toney	**Mamaux** (10–3)	—	—	28–26
57	June 26	Reds	6–3	**McQuillan** (4–6)	Dale	—	6,000	29–26
58	June 29	@ Cardinals	8–5	**Adams** (5–5)	Meadows	—	—	30–26
59	June 29	@ Cardinals	4–6	Robinson	**Cooper** (2–7)	Griner	10,000	30–27
60	June 30	@ Cardinals	0–2	Doak	**Adams** (5–6)	—	—	30–28
61	June 30	@ Cardinals	4–2 (10)	**McQuillan** (5–6)	Sallee	—	8,000	31–28

July: 16–17 (Home: 5–4; Away: 11–13)

#	Date	Opponent	Score	Win	Loss	Save	Attendance	Record
62	July 1	@ Cubs	4–0	**Mamaux** (11–3)	Vaughn	—	1,500	32–28
63	July 2	@ Cubs	1–2	Pierce	**Harmon** (8–5)	—	2,000	32–29
64	July 3	@ Cubs	5–6	Humphries	**Cooper** (2–8)	Lavender	—	32–30
65	July 3	@ Cubs	4–2	**Adams** (6–6)	Zabel	—	12,000	33–30
66	July 4	@ Cubs	5–8	Cheney	**McQuillan** (5–7)	Lavender	—	33–31
67	July 5	Cardinals	1–3	Doak	**Mamaux** (11–4)	—	—	33–32
68	July 5	Cardinals	5–0	**Harmon** (9–5)	Meadows	—	—	34–32
69	July 6	Cardinals	1–2	Griner	**Kantlehner** (0–2)	—	1,200	34–33
70	July 7	Cubs	4–7	Lavender	**Adams** (6–7)	—	—	34–34
71	July 8	@ Phillies	2–0	**Mamaux** (12–4)	Rixey	—	—	35–34
72	July 9	@ Phillies	1–2	Alexander	**Harmon** (9–6)	—	—	35–35
73	July 10	@ Phillies	3–6	Demaree	**Adams** (6–8)	—	12,000	35–36
74	July 12	@ Phillies	2–1	**McQuillan** (6–7)	Mayer	**Cooper** (2)	—	36–36
75	July 12	@ Phillies	4–2	**Mamaux** (13–4)	Chalmers	—	13,000	37–36
76	July 13	@ Braves	3–1	**Kantlehner** (1–2)	Ragan	—	—	38–36
77	July 13	@ Braves	6–7	Davis	**Harmon** (9–7)	Hughes	—	38–37
78	July 15	@ Braves	2–3	Rudolph	**Cooper** (2–9)	—	—	38–38
79	July 16	@ Braves	5–6 (15)	Hughes	**Adams** (6–9)	—	—	38–39
80	July 17	@ Robins	5–3	**McQuillan** (7–7)	Smith	**Kantlehner** (1)	—	39–39
81	July 17	@ Robins	3–7 (7)	Coombs	**Conzelman** (1–1)	—	22,000	39–40
82	July 19	@ Robins	0–3	Rucker	**Kantlehner** (1–3)	—	—	39–41
83	July 20	@ Robins	6–2	**Harmon** (10–7)	Douglas	—	—	40–41
84	July 23	@ Giants	6–1	**Adams** (7–9)	Mathewson	—	—	41–41
85	July 23	@ Giants	4–3	**Mamaux** (14–4)	Tesreau	**Cooper** (3)	15,000	42–41
86	July 24	@ Giants	4–8	Marquard	**Harmon** (10–8)	—	—	42–42
87	July 24	@ Giants	2–4	Perritt	**Cooper** (2–10)	—	—	42–43
88	July 26	@ Giants	2–1	**Adams** (8–9)	Mathewson	—	—	43–43
89	July 26	@ Giants	0–3	Tesreau	**McQuillan** (7–8)	—	10,000	43–44
90	July 27	Giants	8–1	**Mamaux** (15–4)	Marquard	—	4,000	44–44
91	July 29	Robins	8–2	**Kantlehner** (2–3)	Pfeffer	—	2,500	45–44
92	July 30	Robins	2–3	Rucker	**Harmon** (10–9)	—	—	45–45
93	July 31	Robins	5–0	**Mamaux** (16–4)	Appleton	—	—	46–45
94	July 31	Robins	5–4 (10)	**McQuillan** (8–8)	Pfeffer	—	12,000	47–45

August: 11–20 (Home: 6–8; Away: 5–12)

#	Date	Opponent	Score	Win	Loss	Save	Attendance	Record
95	August 3	Braves	4–5	Ragan	**Kantlehner** (2–4)	Hughes	—	47–46
96	August 3	Braves	2–7	Tyler	**Harmon** (10–10)	—	—	47–47
97	August 4	Braves	1–5	Hughes	**Mamaux** (16–5)	—	—	47–48
98	August 5	Phillies	1–0	**Adams** (9–9)	Alexander	—	—	48–48
99	August 6	Phillies	4–5	Demaree	**McQuillan** (8–9)	Mayer	—	48–49
100	August 7	Phillies	9–0	**Mamaux** (17–5)	Mayer	—	—	49–49
101	August 7	Phillies	6–0	**Harmon** (11–10)	Rixey	—	—	50–49
102	August 10	Giants	8–2	**Adams** (10–9)	Marquard	—	—	51–49
103	August 12	Giants	4–0	**Mamaux** (18–5)	Tesreau	—	—	52–49
104	August 13	Reds	3–4	McKenry	**Harmon** (11–11)	—	—	52–50
105	August 14	Reds	4–5 (11)	Lear	**Kantlehner** (2–5)	—	—	52–51
106	August 14	Reds	0–6	Toney	**McQuillan** (8–10)	—	—	52–52
107	August 15	@ Reds	2–6	Dale	**Cooper** (2–11)	—	—	52–53
108	August 15	@ Reds	2–6	McKenry	**Harmon** (11–12)	—	—	52–54
109	August 16	Reds	5–4	**Kantlehner** (3–5)	Lear	—	—	53–54
110	August 17	Cubs	4–6	Zabel	**Cooper** (2–12)	—	—	53–55
111	August 18	@ Phillies	8–4	**Adams** (11–9)	Mayer	—	—	54–55
112	August 19	@ Phillies	8–3	**Harmon** (12–12)	Demaree	—	—	55–55
113	August 20	@ Phillies	3–4 (11)	Alexander	**Cooper** (2–13)	—	—	55–56
114	August 21	@ Braves	1–3	Rudolph	**Kantlehner** (3–6)	—	—	55–57
115	August 21	@ Braves	0–2	Nehf	**Mamaux** (18–6)	—	20,000	55–58
116	August 23	@ Braves	2–3	Hughes	**Adams** (11–10)	—	—	55–59
117	August 24	@ Braves	0–10	Ragan	**Cooper** (2–14)	—	—	55–60
118	August 25	@ Giants	3–5	Perritt	**Harmon** (12–13)	—	—	55–61
119	August 25	@ Giants	9–7	**Mamaux** (19–6)	Benton	**Kantlehner** (2)	—	56–61
120	August 26	@ Giants	2–1	**Kantlehner** (4–6)	Stroud	—	—	57–61
121	August 27	@ Giants	1–2	Mathewson	**Adams** (11–11)	—	—	57–62
122	August 28	@ Robins	1–2	Rucker	**Harmon** (12–14)	—	—	57–63
123	August 28	@ Robins	0–3	Pfeffer	**Kantlehner** (4–7)	—	13,000	57–64
124	August 31	@ Robins	5–3	**Kelly** (1–0)	Coombs	**Cooper** (4)	—	58–64
125	August 31	@ Robins	2–3	Marquard	**Kantlehner** (4–8)	—	—	58–65

September: 14–14 (Home: 12–14; Away: 2–0)

#	Date	Opponent	Score	Win	Loss	Save	Attendance	Record
126	September 1	Cardinals	0–4	Sallee	**Adams** (11–12)	—	—	58–66
127	September 1	Cardinals	7–0	**Harmon** (13–14)	Perdue	—	—	59–66
128	September 2	Cardinals	2–7	Doak	**Kelly** (1–1)	—	—	59–67
129	September 3	Cubs	4–1	**Mamaux** (20–6)	Humphries	—	—	60–67
130	September 4	Cubs	2–5	Vaughn	**Kantlehner** (4–9)	—	—	60–68
131	September 4	Cubs	2–1 (12)	**Adams** (12–12)	Lavender	—	7,000	61–68
132	September 5	@ Cubs	13–2	**Cooper** (3–14)	Adams	—	—	62–68
133	September 6	Reds	0–3	Schneider	**Mamaux** (20–7)	—	—	62–69
134	September 6	Reds	5–2	**Harmon** (14–14)	McKenry	—	8,000	63–69
135	September 7	Reds	3–6	Toney	**Adams** (12–13)	—	—	63–70
136	September 10	Braves	8–1	**Adams** (13–13)	Nehf	—	—	64–70
137	September 10	Braves	2–3 (10)	Rudolph	**Kantlehner** (4–10)	—	4,500	64–71
138	September 11	Phillies	2–3	Mayer	**Harmon** (14–15)	—	—	64–72
139	September 13	Phillies	2–4 (13)	Alexander	**Cooper** (3–15)	—	—	64–73
140	September 14	Phillies	3–4	Chalmers	**Adams** (13–14)	—	—	64–74
141	September 15	Phillies	1–0	**Kantlehner** (5–10)	Mayer	—	—	65–74
142	September 16	Giants	4–8	Tesreau	**Harmon** (14–16)	—	—	65–75
143	September 17	Giants	9–6	**Cooper** (4–15)	Benton	—	—	66–75
144	September 17	Giants	5–0	**Hill** (1–0)	Perritt	—	—	67–75
145	September 18	Giants	8–2	**Mamaux** (21–7)	Mathewson	—	—	68–75
146	September 18	Giants	2–7	Tesreau	**Kantlehner** (5–11)	—	—	68–76
147	September 20	Robins	1–0	**Harmon** (15–16)	Pfeffer	—	—	69–76
148	September 22	Robins	2–4	Rucker	**Cooper** (4–16)	—	—	69–77
149	September 22	Robins	2–1	**Hill** (2–0)	Cheney	—	—	70–77
150	September 23	Braves	8–4	**Cooper** (5–16)	Rudolph	—	—	71–77
151	September 24	Braves	0–2	Nehf	**Kantlehner** (5–12)	—	—	71–78
152	September 25	Braves	2–5	Hughes	**Harmon** (15–17)	—	—	71–79
153	September 30	@ Cardinals	6–5 (10)	**Harmon** (16–17)	Perdue	—	—	72–79

October: 1–2 (Home: 0–0; Away: 1–2)

#	Date	Opponent	Score	Win	Loss	Save	Attendance	Record
154	October 1	@ Cardinals	3–6	Doak	**Hill** (2–1)	Sallee	—	72–80
155	October 2	@ Cardinals	1–3	Ames	**Mamaux** (21–8)	—	—	72–81
156	October 3	@ Reds	5–3	**Adams** (14–14)	Schneider	—	—	73–81

Legend: = Win = Loss = Tie
Bold = Pirates team member

=== Roster ===
1915 Pittsburgh Pirates
**Roster**
**Pitchers**: Babe Adams; Joe Conzelman; Wilbur Cooper; Bob Harmon; Carmen Hill; Erv Kantlehner; Herb Kelly; Al Mamaux; George McQuillan; Phil Slattery; Dazzy Vance	**Catchers**: George Gibson; Leo Murphy; Bobby Schang; Bill Wagner; **Infielders**: Doug Baird; Wally Gerber; Doc Johnston; Ike McAuley; Alex McCarthy; Paddy Siglin; Jim Viox; Honus Wagner	**Outfielders**: Ed Barney; Max Carey; Fred Clarke; Zip Collins; Dan Costello; Pat Duncan; Bill Hinchman; Larry LeJeune; Fritz Scheeren; **Other batters**: Harry Daubert; Syd Smith	**Manager**: Fred Clarke

== Player stats ==
=== Batting ===
==== Starters by position ====
Note: Pos = Position; G = Games played; AB = At bats; H = Hits; Avg. = Batting average; HR = Home runs; RBI = Runs batted in

Pos	Player	G	AB	H	Avg.	HR	RBI
C	George Gibson	120	351	88	.251	1	30
1B	Doc Johnston	147	543	144	.265	5	64
2B	Jim Viox	150	503	129	.256	2	45
SS	Honus Wagner	156	566	155	.274	6	78
3B	Doug Baird	145	512	112	.219	1	53
OF	Bill Hinchman	156	577	177	.307	5	77
OF	Zip Collins	101	354	104	.294	1	23
OF	Max Carey	140	564	143	.254	3	27

==== Other batters ====
Note: G = Games played; AB = At bats; H = Hits; Avg. = Batting average; HR = Home runs; RBI = Runs batted in

Player	G	AB	H	Avg.	HR	RBI
Wally Gerber	56	144	28	.194	0	7
Bobby Schang	56	125	23	.184	0	4
Dan Costello	71	125	27	.216	0	11
Ed Barney	32	99	27	.273	0	5
Sheldon Lejeune	18	65	11	.169	0	2
Alex McCarthy	21	49	10	.204	0	3
Leo Murphy	31	41	4	.098	0	4
Ike McAuley	5	15	2	.133	0	0
Paddy Siglin	6	7	2	.286	0	0
Bill Wagner	5	5	0	.000	0	0
Pat Duncan	3	5	1	.200	0	0
Fritz Scheeren	4	3	0	.000	0	0
Fred Clarke	1	2	1	.500	0	0
Harry Daubert	1	1	0	.000	0	0
Syd Smith	1	1	0	.000	0	0

=== Pitching ===
==== Starting pitchers ====
Note: G = Games pitched; IP = Innings pitched; W = Wins; L = Losses; ERA = Earned run average; SO = Strikeouts

Player	G	IP	W	L	ERA	SO
Bob Harmon	37	269.2	16	17	2.50	86
Al Mamaux	38	251.2	21	8	2.04	152
Babe Adams	40	245.0	14	14	2.87	62
Dazzy Vance	1	2.2	0	1	10.13	0

==== Other pitchers ====
Note: G = Games pitched; IP = Innings pitched; W = Wins; L = Losses; ERA = Earned run average; SO = Strikeouts

Player	G	IP	W	L	ERA	SO
Wilbur Cooper	38	185.2	5	16	3.30	71
Erv Kantlehner	29	163.0	5	12	2.26	64
George McQuillan	30	149.0	8	10	2.84	56
Carmen Hill	8	47.0	2	1	1.15	24
Herb Kelly	5	11.0	1	1	4.09	6

==== Relief pitchers ====
Note: G = Games pitched; W = Wins; L = Losses; SV = Saves; ERA = Earned run average; SO = Strikeouts

Player	G	IP	W	L	ERA	SO
Joe Conzelman	18	1	1	0	3.42	22
Phil Slattery	3	0	0	0	0.00	1
