= John Karst =

American baseball player (1893-1976)

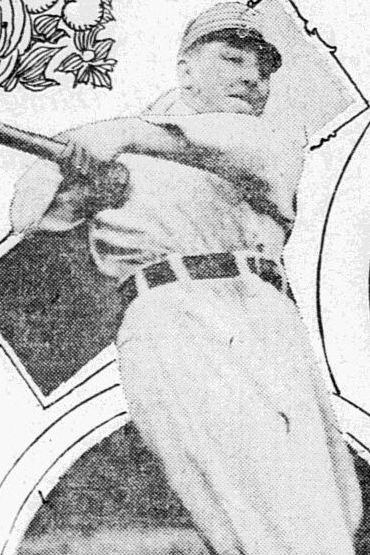
- Third baseman
- Born: October 15, 1893; Philadelphia
- Died: May 21, 1976 (aged 82); Cape May Court House, New Jersey
- Batted: Left Threw: Right

MLB debut
- October 6, 1915, for the Brooklyn Robins

Last MLB appearance
- October 6, 1915, for the Brooklyn Robins

MLB statistics
- Batting average: .000
- Home runs: 0
- Runs batted in: 0
- Stats at Baseball Reference

Teams
- Brooklyn Robins (1915)

John Gottlieb Karst (October 15, 1893 in Philadelphia – May 21, 1976 in Cape May Court House, New Jersey), was a professional baseball player who played third base in one game for the 1915 Brooklyn Robins. He attended the University of Pennsylvania.
