= 1915 Philadelphia Phillies season =

Major League Baseball season

1915 Philadelphia Phillies
- National League champions
- League: National League
- Ballpark: National League Park
- City: Philadelphia, Pennsylvania, U.S.
- Owners: William F. Baker
- Managers: Pat Moran

The 1915 Philadelphia Phillies season was a season in American baseball. It involved the Phillies winning the National League, then going on to lose the World Series to the Boston Red Sox.

This was the team's first pennant since joining the league in 1883. It would have to wait another thirty-five years for its second — and another sixty-five years for its first World Championship.

== Offseason ==
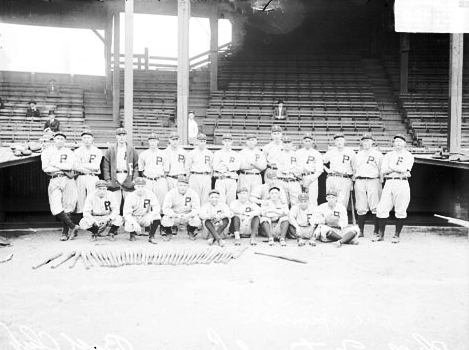
The 1915 Phillies, the first time that the franchise made the postseason

- February 14, 1915: Sherry Magee was traded by the Phillies to the Boston Braves for Oscar Dugey, Possum Whitted, and cash.

== Regular season ==
The pitching staff allowed the fewest runs in the NL. It was led by Hall of Famer Grover Cleveland Alexander, who had one of the greatest seasons in history and won the pitching triple crown.

Outfielder Gavvy Cravath, aided by the small Baker Bowl park, led the majors in home runs, runs batted in, and slugging percentage.

=== Season standings ===
National League
| Team | W | L | Pct. | GB | Home | Road |
|---|---|---|---|---|---|---|
| Philadelphia Phillies | 90 | 62 | .592 | — | 49‍–‍27 | 41‍–‍35 |
| Boston Braves | 83 | 69 | .546 | 7 | 49‍–‍27 | 34‍–‍42 |
| Brooklyn Robins | 80 | 72 | .526 | 10 | 51‍–‍26 | 29‍–‍46 |
| Chicago Cubs | 73 | 80 | .477 | 17½ | 42‍–‍34 | 31‍–‍46 |
| Pittsburgh Pirates | 73 | 81 | .474 | 18 | 40‍–‍37 | 33‍–‍44 |
| St. Louis Cardinals | 72 | 81 | .471 | 18½ | 42‍–‍36 | 30‍–‍45 |
| Cincinnati Reds | 71 | 83 | .461 | 20 | 39‍–‍37 | 32‍–‍46 |
| New York Giants | 69 | 83 | .454 | 21 | 37‍–‍38 | 32‍–‍45 |

=== Record vs. opponents ===
1915 National League record Sources:
| Team | BSN | BRO | CHI | CIN | NYG | PHI | PIT | STL |
|---|---|---|---|---|---|---|---|---|
| Boston | — | 14–8–1 | 10–12–1 | 15–7 | 13–9–1 | 7–14 | 15–7 | 9–12–2 |
| Brooklyn | 8–14–1 | — | 14–8 | 11–11–1 | 12–8 | 13–9 | 11–11 | 11–11 |
| Chicago | 12–10–1 | 8–14 | — | 13–9–2 | 8–14 | 7–14 | 13–9 | 12–10 |
| Cincinnati | 7–15 | 11–11–1 | 9–13–2 | — | 9–13–1 | 9–13 | 12–10–1 | 14–8–1 |
| New York | 9–13–1 | 8–12 | 14–8 | 13–9–1 | — | 7–15–1 | 8–14 | 10–12 |
| Philadelphia | 14–7 | 9–13 | 14–7 | 13–9 | 15–7–1 | — | 10–12 | 15–7 |
| Pittsburgh | 7–15 | 11–11 | 9–13 | 10–12–1 | 14–8 | 12–10 | — | 10–12–1 |
| St. Louis | 12–9–2 | 11–11 | 10–12 | 8–14–1 | 12–10 | 7–15 | 12–10–1 | — |

=== Roster ===
1915 Philadelphia Phillies
Roster
| Pitchers: Pete Alexander; Stan Baumgartner; George Chalmers; Al Demaree; Erskine Mayer; George McQuillan; Joe Oeschger; Eppa Rixey; Ben Tincup | Catchers: Bert Adams; Ed Burns; Bill Killefer; Infielders: Dave Bancroft; Bobby Byrne; Oscar Dugey; Fred Luderus; Bert Niehoff; Milt Stock | Outfielders: Beals Becker; Gavvy Cravath; Dode Paskert; Bud Weiser; Possum Whitted | Manager: Pat Moran |

== Player stats ==
=== Batting ===
==== Starters by position ====
Note: Pos = Position; G = Games played; AB = At bats; H = Hits; Avg. = Batting average; HR = Home runs; RBI = Runs batted in

| Pos | Player | G | AB | H | Avg. | HR | RBI |
|---|---|---|---|---|---|---|---|
| C | Bill Killefer | 105 | 320 | 76 | .238 | 0 | 24 |
| 1B | Fred Luderus | 141 | 499 | 157 | .315 | 7 | 62 |
| 2B | Bert Niehoff | 148 | 529 | 126 | .238 | 2 | 49 |
| 3B | Bobby Byrne | 105 | 387 | 81 | .209 | 0 | 21 |
| SS | Dave Bancroft | 153 | 563 | 143 | .254 | 7 | 30 |
| OF | Gavvy Cravath | 150 | 522 | 149 | .285 | 24 | 115 |
| OF | Beals Becker | 112 | 338 | 83 | .246 | 11 | 35 |
| OF | Possum Whitted | 128 | 448 | 126 | .281 | 1 | 43 |

==== Other batters ====
Note: G = Games played; AB = At bats; H = Hits; Avg. = Batting average; HR = Home runs; RBI = Runs batted in

| Player | G | AB | H | Avg. | HR | RBI |
|---|---|---|---|---|---|---|
| Dode Paskert | 109 | 328 | 80 | .244 | 3 | 39 |
| Milt Stock | 69 | 227 | 59 | .260 | 1 | 15 |
| Ed Burns | 67 | 174 | 42 | .241 | 0 | 16 |
| Bud Weiser | 37 | 64 | 9 | .141 | 0 | 8 |
| Oscar Dugey | 42 | 39 | 6 | .154 | 0 | 0 |
| Bert Adams | 24 | 27 | 3 | .111 | 0 | 2 |

=== Pitching ===
==== Starting pitchers ====
Note: G = Games pitched; IP = Innings pitched; W = Wins; L = Losses; ERA = Earned run average; SO = Strikeouts

| Player | G | IP | W | L | ERA | SO |
|---|---|---|---|---|---|---|
| Pete Alexander | 49 | 376.1 | 31 | 10 | 1.22 | 241 |
| Erskine Mayer | 43 | 274.2 | 21 | 15 | 2.36 | 114 |
| Al Demaree | 32 | 209.2 | 14 | 11 | 3.05 | 69 |
| Eppa Rixey | 29 | 176.2 | 11 | 12 | 2.39 | 88 |
| George Chalmers | 26 | 170.1 | 8 | 9 | 2.48 | 82 |
| George McQuillan | 9 | 63.2 | 4 | 3 | 2.12 | 13 |

==== Other pitchers ====
Note: G = Games pitched; IP = Innings pitched; W = Wins; L = Losses; ERA = Earned run average; SO = Strikeouts

| Player | G | IP | W | L | ERA | SO |
|---|---|---|---|---|---|---|
| Joe Oeschger | 6 | 23.2 | 1 | 0 | 3.42 | 8 |

==== Relief pitchers ====
Note: G = Games pitched; W = Wins; L = Losses; SV = Saves; ERA = Earned run average; SO = Strikeouts

| Player | G | W | L | SV | ERA | SO |
|---|---|---|---|---|---|---|
| Stan Baumgartner | 16 | 0 | 2 | 0 | 2.42 | 27 |
| Ben Tincup | 10 | 0 | 0 | 0 | 2.03 | 10 |

== Awards and honors ==
=== League top five finishers ===
Grover Cleveland Alexander

- MLB leader in wins (31)
- MLB leader in ERA (1.22)
- MLB leader in strikeouts (241)
- MLB leader in shutouts (12)

Dave Bancroft

- #3 in NL in runs scored (85)

Gavvy Cravath

- MLB leader in home runs (24)
- MLB leader in RBI (115)
- MLB leader in slugging percentage (.510)
- NL leader in runs scored (89)
- NL leader in on-base percentage (.393)

Fred Luderus

- #2 in NL in batting average (.315)
- #2 in NL in slugging percentage (.457)

Erskine Mayer

- #3 in NL in wins (21)

== Postseason ==
=== 1915 World Series ===
==== Game 1 ====
The Phillies won 3 to 1, although The New York Times reporter Hugh Fullerton wrote, "Alexander pitched a bad game of ball. He had little or nothing." He titled his article, "Nothing but luck saved the Phillies." The Times also reported that 10,000 people gathered in New York City's Times Square to watch a real-time mechanical recreation of the game on a giant scoreboard sponsored by the newspaper.

October 8, 1915, at National League Park in Philadelphia

| Team | 1 | 2 | 3 | 4 | 5 | 6 | 7 | 8 | 9 | R | H | E |
|---|---|---|---|---|---|---|---|---|---|---|---|---|
| Boston | 0 | 0 | 0 | 0 | 0 | 0 | 0 | 1 | 0 | 1 | 8 | 1 |
| Philadelphia | 0 | 0 | 0 | 1 | 0 | 0 | 0 | 2 | x | 3 | 5 | 1 |
W: Grover Cleveland Alexander (1–0) L: Ernie Shore (0–1)

==== Game 2 ====
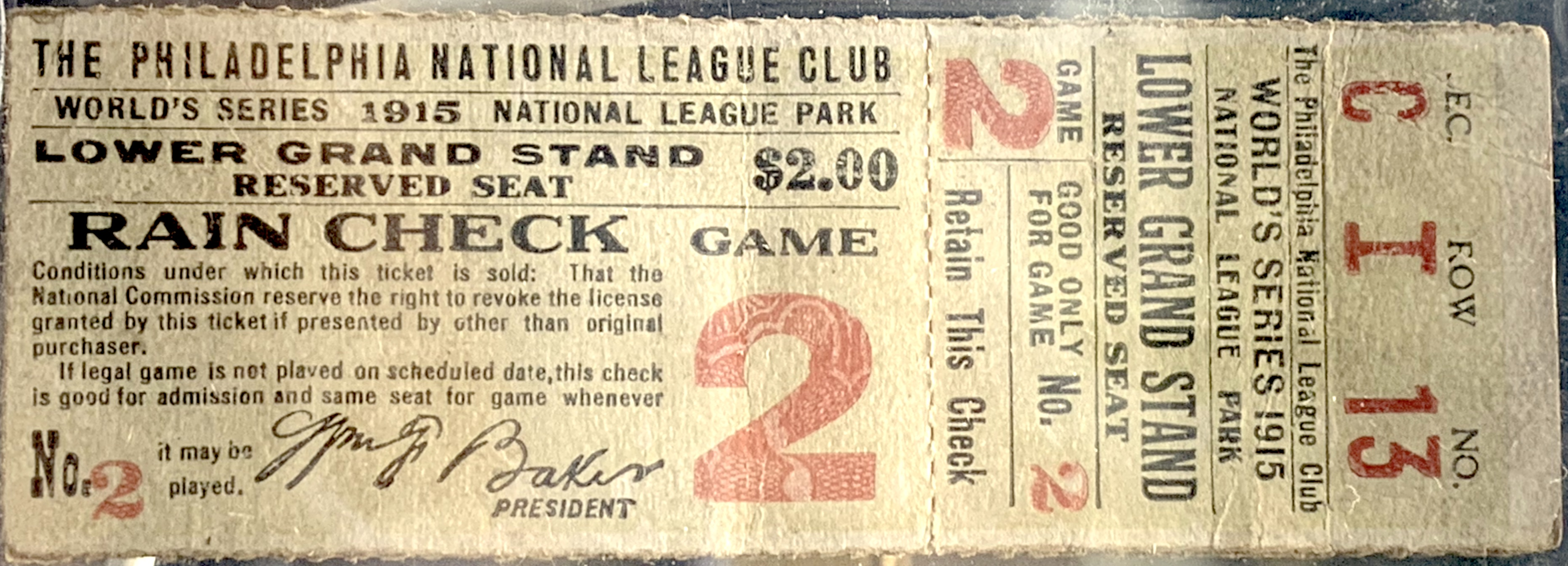
Ticket for 1915 World Series Game 2 held October 9, 1915 at Philadelphia's National League Park

October 9, 1915, at National League Park in Philadelphia

| Team | 1 | 2 | 3 | 4 | 5 | 6 | 7 | 8 | 9 | R | H | E |
|---|---|---|---|---|---|---|---|---|---|---|---|---|
| Boston | 1 | 0 | 0 | 0 | 0 | 0 | 0 | 0 | 1 | 2 | 10 | 0 |
| Philadelphia | 0 | 0 | 0 | 0 | 1 | 0 | 0 | 0 | 0 | 1 | 3 | 1 |
W: Rube Foster (1–0) L: Erskine Mayer (0–1)

==== Game 3 ====
October 11, 1915, at Braves Field in Boston, Massachusetts

| Team | 1 | 2 | 3 | 4 | 5 | 6 | 7 | 8 | 9 | R | H | E |
|---|---|---|---|---|---|---|---|---|---|---|---|---|
| Philadelphia | 0 | 0 | 1 | 0 | 0 | 0 | 0 | 0 | 0 | 1 | 3 | 0 |
| Boston | 0 | 0 | 0 | 1 | 0 | 0 | 0 | 0 | 1 | 2 | 6 | 1 |
W: Dutch Leonard (1–0) L: Grover Cleveland Alexander (1–1)

==== Game 4 ====
October 12, 1915, at Braves Field in Boston, Massachusetts

| Team | 1 | 2 | 3 | 4 | 5 | 6 | 7 | 8 | 9 | R | H | E |
|---|---|---|---|---|---|---|---|---|---|---|---|---|
| Philadelphia | 0 | 0 | 0 | 0 | 0 | 0 | 0 | 1 | 0 | 1 | 7 | 0 |
| Boston | 0 | 0 | 1 | 0 | 0 | 1 | 0 | 0 | x | 2 | 8 | 1 |
W: Ernie Shore (1–1) L: George Chalmers (0–1)

==== Game 5 ====
October 13, 1915, at National League Park in Philadelphia

| Team | 1 | 2 | 3 | 4 | 5 | 6 | 7 | 8 | 9 | R | H | E |
|---|---|---|---|---|---|---|---|---|---|---|---|---|
| Boston | 0 | 1 | 1 | 0 | 0 | 0 | 0 | 2 | 1 | 5 | 10 | 1 |
| Philadelphia | 2 | 0 | 0 | 2 | 0 | 0 | 0 | 0 | 0 | 4 | 9 | 1 |
W: Rube Foster (2–0) L: Eppa Rixey (0–1)

=== Legacy ===
On October 16, 1915, a testimonial dinner was given to honor the 1915 Phillies for the franchise's first pennant. The dinner took place at The Bellevue-Stratford Hotel. Speakers included Philadelphia mayor Rudolph Blankenburg, Phillies owner William Baker, National League president John Tener, and Phillies manager Pat Moran.

The team marked its 25th anniversary in 1940 when the pennant remained the club's lone to date. Gerry Nugent announced in April 1940 that the organization would welcome back the players from the 1915 team to celebrate the anniversary. Bill Killefer, Bert Neihoff, Milt Stock, and Ben Tincup all remained in organized baseball in 1940 as managers or coaches.
