= Danny Murphy (catcher) =

American baseball player (1864–1915)

- Catcher
- Born: September 10, 1864; Brooklyn, New York, U.S.
- Died: December 14, 1915 (aged 51); Brooklyn, New York, U.S.
- Batted: Unknown Threw: Unknown

MLB debut
- April 26, 1892, for the New York Giants

Last MLB appearance
- June 11, 1892, for the New York Giants

MLB statistics
- Games played: 8
- At bats: 26
- Hits: 3
- Stats at Baseball Reference

Teams
- New York Giants (1892)

Daniel Joseph Murphy (September 10, 1864 – December 14, 1915) was an American professional baseball catcher. He played part of one season in Major League Baseball for the New York Giants of the National League in 1892. In eight games with the Giants, he had a .115 batting average.

== Sources ==
- Career statistics from Baseball Reference · Baseball Reference (Minors) · Retrosheet · Baseball Almanac
