= Joe Schultz (outfielder) =

American baseball player (1893–1941)

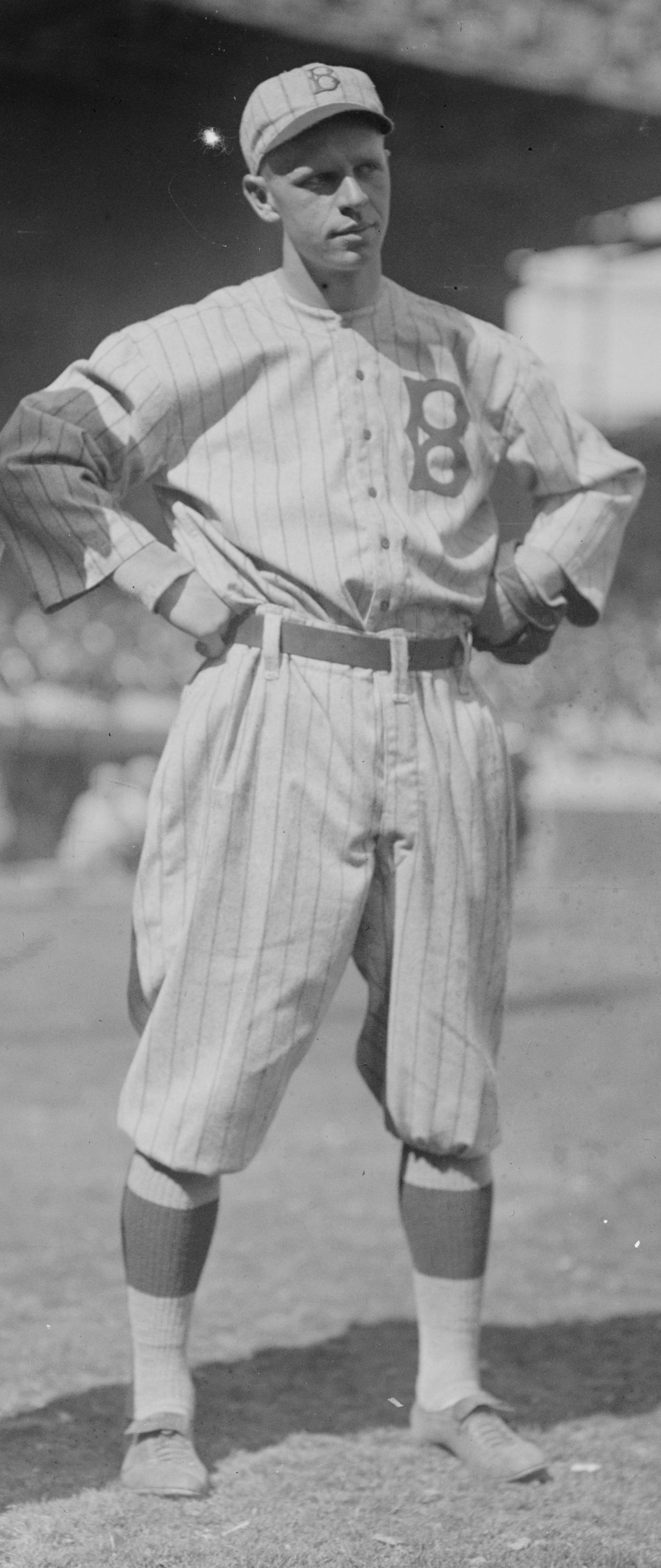
- Outfielder
- Born: July 24, 1893; Pittsburgh, Pennsylvania, U.S.
- Died: April 13, 1941 (aged 47); Columbia, South Carolina, U.S.
- Batted: Right Threw: Right

MLB debut
- September 27, 1912, for the Boston Braves

Last MLB appearance
- October 4, 1925, for the Cincinnati Reds

MLB statistics
- Batting average: .285
- Home runs: 15
- Runs batted in: 248
- Stats at Baseball Reference

Teams
- Boston Braves (1912–1913); Brooklyn Robins (1915); Chicago Cubs (1915); Pittsburgh Pirates (1916); St. Louis Cardinals (1919–1924); Philadelphia Phillies (1924–1925); Cincinnati Reds (1925)

Joseph Charles Schultz Sr. (July 24, 1893 – April 13, 1941), nicknamed "Germany", was an American professional baseball outfielder in Major League Baseball from 1912 to 1925. He played for the Boston Braves, Brooklyn Robins, Chicago Cubs, Pittsburgh Pirates, St. Louis Cardinals, Philadelphia Phillies and Cincinnati Reds.

== Biography ==
Born in Pittsburgh, Pennsylvania on July 24, 1893, Schultz was the father of former MLB catcher, coach and manager Joe Schultz, and a cousin of Frank Lobert and Hans Lobert. During his career, Schultz Sr. played for seven of the eight existing National League clubs, with the exception of the New York Giants. A 5 ft 11 in (1.80 m), 172 lb (78 kg) right-handed batter and thrower, he hit .285 with 558 hits, 15 home runs and 248 RBI in 703 major league games. In his finest season, 1922 for the St. Louis Cardinals, he appeared in 112 games, garnered 108 hits and batted .314 with two home runs and 64 runs batted in.

After his playing career, Schultz became a manager in the far-flung Cardinals farm system. He led the 1931 Houston Buffaloes to 108 regular-season victories (in 159 games) and the Texas League championship.

In 1939, Schultz became the farm system director of the Pittsburgh Pirates.

== Death and legacy ==
In April 1941, while he was en route to visit one of the Pittsburgh farm clubs in Moultrie, Georgia, Schultz was suddenly stricken with acute toxic hepatitis and died in Columbia, South Carolina, at the age of 47. His son, Joe Jr., a backup catcher for the Pirates, took the field in an exhibition match shortly before his father's death.
