= Fletcher Low =

American baseball player (1893-1973)

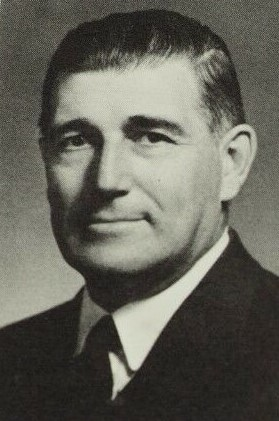
- Third baseman
- Born: April 7, 1893; Essex, Massachusetts, U.S.
- Died: June 6, 1973 (aged 80); Hanover, New Hampshire, U.S.
- Batted: Right Threw: Right

MLB debut
- October 7, 1915, for the Boston Braves

Last MLB appearance
- October 7, 1915, for the Boston Braves

MLB statistics
- Games played: 1
- At bats: 4
- Hits: 1
- Stats at Baseball Reference

Teams
- Boston Braves (1915)

Fletcher Low (April 7, 1893 – June 6, 1973) was an American third baseman in Major League Baseball. He played for the Boston Braves in 1915. He was a longtime professor of chemistry at Dartmouth College, and was a prominent figure in New Hampshire politics.

== Baseball career ==
A native of Essex, Massachusetts, Low graduated from Dartmouth College in 1915. While at Dartmouth, he played for the Falmouth Cottage Club in what is now the Cape Cod Baseball League during the summer of 1914.

Low was signed by the Boston Braves in 1915, and appeared in a single game for the major league club. On October 7, 1915, he played third base for Boston in a game against the New York Giants at Braves Field, sharing the Braves' infield with Baseball Hall of Famers Johnny Evers and Rabbit Maranville. In four at bats against Giants pitcher Sailor Stroud, Low tripled and drove in a run in the Braves' 15-8 loss.

== Academic and political career ==
Low went on to earn a Master of Arts and PhD from Columbia University, and from 1917 to his retirement in 1960 he served on the Dartmouth faculty as a professor of chemistry. Low also served in the New Hampshire House of Representatives and the Hanover, New Hampshire board of education and board of selectmen. He died in 1973.
