= Phil Douglas (baseball) =

American baseball player (1890–1952)

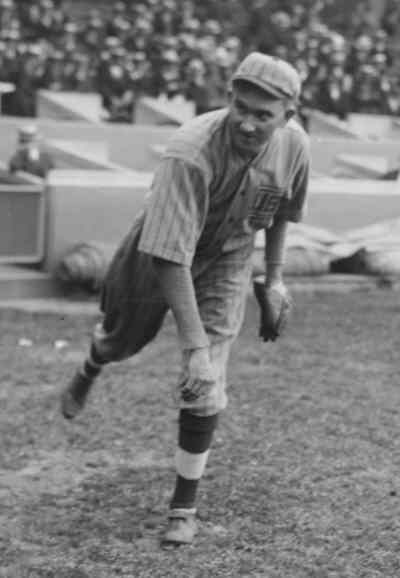
- Douglas in 1918
- Pitcher
- Born: June 17, 1890; Cedartown, Georgia, U.S.
- Died: August 1, 1952 (aged 62); Sequatchie County, Tennessee, U.S.
- Batted: Right Threw: Right

MLB debut
- August 30, 1912, for the Chicago White Sox

Last MLB appearance
- July 30, 1922, for the New York Giants

MLB statistics
- Win–loss record: 94–93
- Earned run average: 2.80
- Strikeouts: 683
- Stats at Baseball Reference

Teams
- Chicago White Sox (1912); Cincinnati Reds (1914–1915); Brooklyn Robins (1915); Chicago Cubs (1915, 1917–1919); New York Giants (1919–1922)

Career highlights and awards
- World Series champion (1921); NL ERA leader (1922)

Phillip Brooks Douglas (June 17, 1890 – August 1, 1952) was an American professional baseball player. He was known as "Shufflin' Phil", most likely because of his slow gait from the bullpen to the mound.

Douglas originally signed with the Chicago White Sox in 1912, but soon landed with the Cincinnati Reds. In 1915, he was traded to the Brooklyn Dodgers, then to the Chicago Cubs. Douglas' short stints with these and future teams stemmed from their frustrations with his well-documented alcoholism, about which a contemporary journalist wrote, "Drinking was not a habit with Douglas—it was a disease."

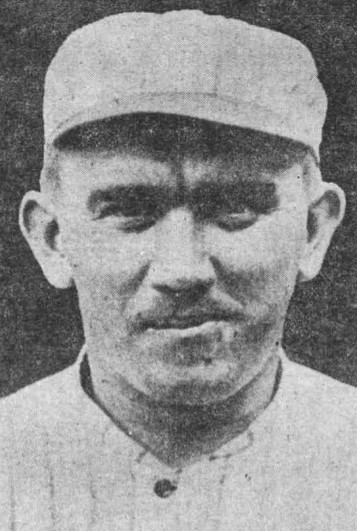
Douglas in 1922

His throwing error on a sacrifice bunt in Game 4 of the 1918 World Series gave the Boston Red Sox a 3–2 victory over the Cubs.

In 1919, he was signed by the New York Giants. John McGraw had some luck in keeping Douglas' drinking under control. In 1920, Douglas had a 14–10 record and a 2.71 ERA. Following the season, the spitball was banned but 17 players, including Douglas, were allowed to continue using the pitch.

Douglas' best year was in 1921, when he won 15 games in the regular season with an ERA of 4.22. He then won two games in the 1921 World Series to help the Giants win the series.

In 1922, he had 11 wins and a league-leading 2.63 ERA, but was suspended after a quarrel with McGraw and fined $100.

Shortly after he was suspended and while intoxicated, Douglas sent the following letter to Les Mann of the St. Louis Cardinals:

I want to leave here but I want some inducement. I don't want this guy to win the pennant and I feel if I stay here I will win it for him. If you want to send a man over here with the goods, I will leave for home on next train. I will go down to fishing camp and stay there.

The letter found its way to Kenesaw Mountain Landis. Landis banned Douglas from baseball for life.

On August 1, 1952, Douglas died in Sequatchie, Tennessee, and was buried in Tracy City, Tennessee.

Douglas was reinstated by Commissioner Rob Manfred on May 13, 2025 along with other deceased players who were on the ineligible list.

== See also ==
- List of Major League Baseball annual ERA leaders
- List of Major League Baseball figures who have been banned for life
