= Bobby Schang =

American baseball player (1886–1966)

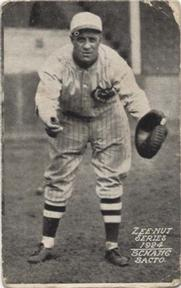
- Catcher
- Born: December 7, 1886; Wales Center, New York, U.S.
- Died: August 29, 1966 (aged 79); Sacramento, California, U.S.
- Batted: Right Threw: Right

MLB debut
- September 23, 1914, for the Pittsburgh Pirates

Last MLB appearance
- May 28, 1927, for the St. Louis Cardinals

MLB statistics
- Batting average: .188
- Home runs: 0
- Runs batted in: 6
- Stats at Baseball Reference

Teams
- Pittsburgh Pirates (1914–1915); New York Giants (1915); St. Louis Cardinals (1927)

Robert Martin Schang (December 7, 1886 – August 29, 1966) was an American professional baseball player. He was a catcher for the Pittsburgh Pirates (1914–15), New York Giants (1915) and St. Louis Cardinals (1927).

He was the brother of former Major League Baseball catcher Wally Schang.

In 3 seasons Schang played in 82 Games and had 186 At Bats, 14 Runs, 35 Hits, 7 Doubles, 4 Triples, 6 RBI, 3 Stolen Bases, 18 Walks, .188 Batting Average, .263 On-base percentage, .269 Slugging Percentage, 50 Total Bases and 8 Sacrifice Hits.

He died in Sacramento, California at the age of 79.

== Sources ==
- Career statistics from Baseball Reference · Baseball Reference (Minors) · Retrosheet · Baseball Almanac
