= Rube Marquard =

American baseball player (1886–1980)

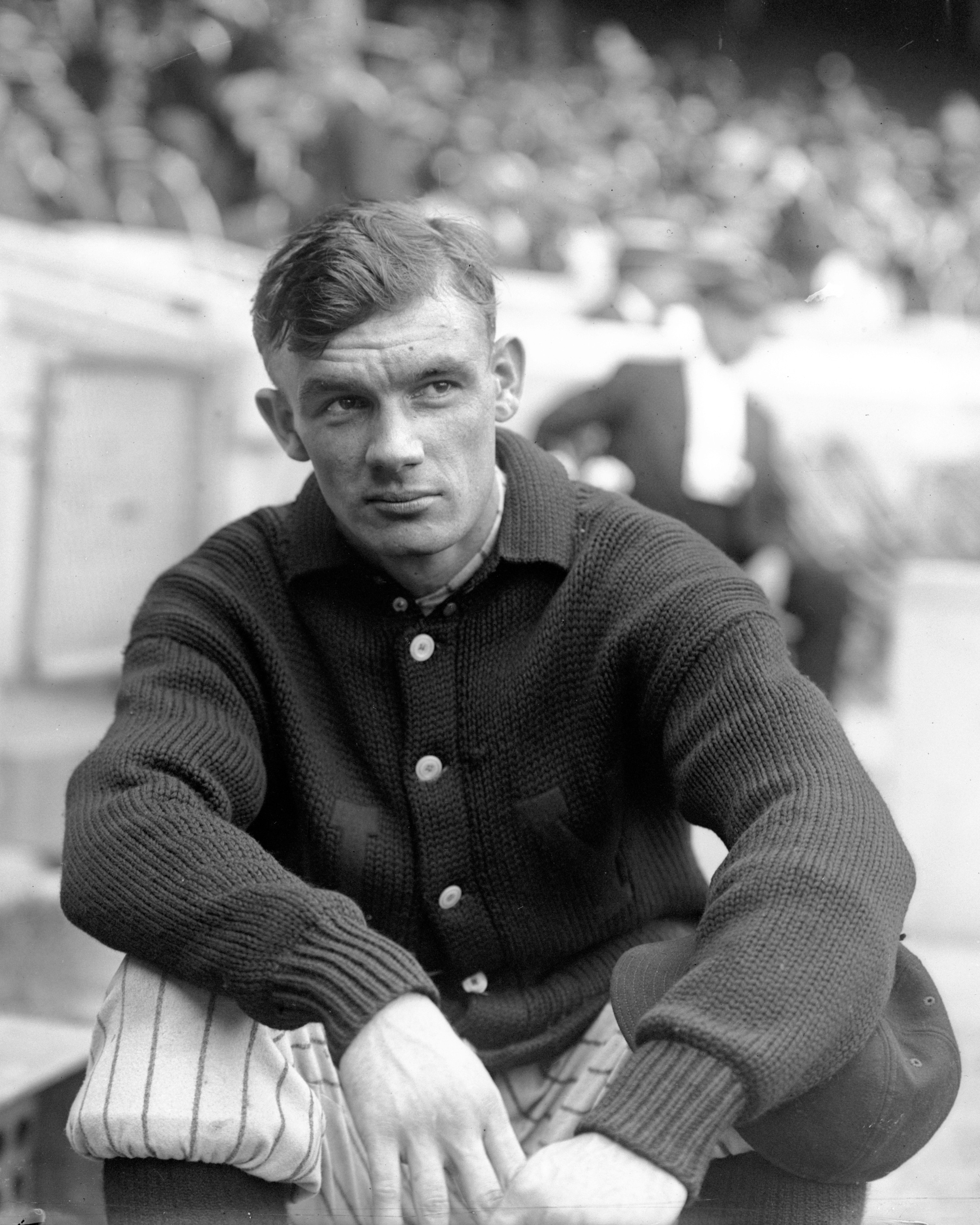
- Pitcher
- Born: October 9, 1886; Cleveland, Ohio, U.S.
- Died: June 1, 1980 (aged 93); Baltimore, Maryland, U.S.
- Batted: Switch Threw: Left

MLB debut
- September 25, 1908, for the New York Giants

Last MLB appearance
- September 18, 1925, for the Boston Braves

MLB statistics
- Win–loss record: 201–177
- Earned run average: 3.08
- Strikeouts: 1,593
- Stats at Baseball Reference

Teams
- New York Giants (1908–1915); Brooklyn Robins (1915–1920); Cincinnati Reds (1921); Boston Braves (1922–1925)

Career highlights and awards
- NL wins leader (1912); NL strikeout leader (1911); Pitched a no-hitter on April 15, 1915

Member of the National

Baseball Hall of Fame
- Induction: 1971
- Election method: Veterans Committee

Richard William "Rube" Marquard (October 9, 1886 – June 1, 1980) was an American left-handed pitcher in Major League Baseball in the 1910s and early 1920s. He achieved his greatest success with the New York Giants. He was inducted into the Baseball Hall of Fame in 1971.

== Early life ==
Rube Marquard was born in Cleveland, Ohio, to German immigrant Fred Marquard and Lena Heiser Marquard. Marquard claimed an 1889 year of birth, but 1900 census data and a birth certificate show an 1886 year of birth. Lena Marquard died of an abdominal infection in 1899, and Rube's grandmother took responsibility for raising him. Marquard quit school after the fifth grade; biographer Larry Mansch writes that he "simply refused to attend any longer".

Newspaper reports first mentioned Marquard in 1905, when he played with an amateur team in Cleveland. Though pitching for a poor team that had a 1–15 win–loss record at one point, Marquard attracted attention as a top pitcher. He broke a City League record with 16 strikeouts in a game against a team known as Brittons Printing. In September, the City League season finished and he signed with the semiprofessional Telling Strollers, an independent team sponsored by an ice cream company.

== Career ==
He started his minor-league baseball career in 1906. Despite his nickname, he was a city kid. As he told it in the 1966 book The Glory of Their Times, a writer in his minor-league days compared him favorably with Rube Waddell, and soon Marquard was being called "Rube", also.

In 1907, he went 23–13 with a 2.01 earned run average (ERA) and led the Central League in wins. In 1908, he went 28–19 with a 1.69 ERA and led the American Association in wins. The New York Giants purchased Marquard for $11,000 — a then unheard-of sum to pay for a baseball player's contract — and his lack of success early in his major-league career led to his being tagged "the $11,000 lemon".

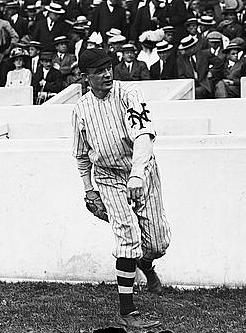
Marquard in 1912

From 1911 to 1913, Marquard won at least 23 games each season, and helped the Giants win three consecutive National League pennants. In 1911, he led the league with 237 strikeouts. In 1912, he led the league with 26 wins. He also made baseball history by winning 19 decisions in a row.

In 1914, Marquard went 12–22, and in 1915, he joined the Brooklyn Robins. He helped the team win pennants in 1916 and 1920. He then played for the Cincinnati Reds in 1921 and Boston Braves from 1922 to 1925.

During the 1920 World Series, he was arrested for ticket scalping in Cleveland. He was alleged to be selling eight world box seats for $350 ($5,625 in current dollar terms), while the original cost was $52.80 ($849 in current dollar terms). He was found guilty and fined $1 plus $3.50 in court costs.

Marquard finished his major-league career in 1925 with a record of 201–177 and a 3.08 ERA. His 1,593 strikeouts ranked third in major-league history among left-handers at the time (behind Rube Waddell and Eddie Plank), and stood as the National League record for southpaws until his total was surpassed by Carl Hubbell, another New York Giant, in 1942.

He later pitched and managed in the minor leagues until 1933. After baseball, he worked as a betting window teller at Narragansett Park.

== Legacy ==
Marquard was a performer in vaudeville, appearing with Blossom Seeley and later marrying her. That same year, Seeley gave birth to a son, Richard William Marquard II.

He was elected to the Baseball Hall of Fame in 1971. His selection has often been criticized by the sabermetrics community, since Marquard's career adjusted ERA+ was only slightly better than league average. Bill James described Marquard as "probably the worst starting pitcher in the Hall of Fame." Marquard had been interviewed for the popular 1966 baseball book, The Glory of Their Times, and his chapter is thought to be one of the primary reasons for his election. However, most of the stories that he "recounted" were later found to be false.

Marquard died in Baltimore, Maryland, on June 1, 1980, at the age of 93. He is interred in Baltimore Hebrew Cemetery in Baltimore.

== See also ==
- List of Major League Baseball individual streaks
- List of Major League Baseball career wins leaders
- List of Major League Baseball annual strikeout leaders
- List of Major League Baseball annual wins leaders
- List of Major League Baseball no-hitters

Preceded by Ed Lafitte	No-hitter pitcher April 15, 1915	Succeeded by Frank Allen
Preceded by Wheezer Dell	Brooklyn Robins Opening Day; Starting pitcher 1918	Succeeded by Leon Cadore
