= 1913 Boston Red Sox season =

Major League Baseball season

1913 Boston Red Sox
- League: American League
- Ballpark: Fenway Park
- City: Boston, Massachusetts
- Record: 79–71 (.527)
- League place: 4th
- Owners: John I. Taylor; Jimmy McAleer
- Managers: Jake Stahl (39–41); Bill Carrigan (40–30)
- Stats: ESPN.com; Baseball Reference

The 1913 Boston Red Sox season was the 13th season in the franchise's Major League Baseball history. The Red Sox finished fourth in the American League (AL) with a record of 79 wins and 71 losses, 15 1/2 games behind the Philadelphia Athletics, who went on to win the 1913 World Series. The team played its home games at Fenway Park.

== Regular season ==
=== Season standings ===
American League
Team	W	L	Pct.	GB	Home	Road
Philadelphia Athletics	96	57	.627	—	50‍–‍26	46‍–‍31
Washington Senators	90	64	.584	6½	42‍–‍35	48‍–‍29
Cleveland Naps	86	66	.566	9½	45‍–‍32	41‍–‍34
Boston Red Sox	79	71	.527	15½	41‍–‍34	38‍–‍37
Chicago White Sox	78	74	.513	17½	40‍–‍37	38‍–‍37
Detroit Tigers	66	87	.431	30	34‍–‍42	32‍–‍45
New York Yankees	57	94	.377	38	27‍–‍47	30‍–‍47
St. Louis Browns	57	96	.373	39	31‍–‍46	26‍–‍50

=== Record vs. opponents ===
1913 American League record Sources:
Team	BOS	CWS	CLE	DET	NYY	PHA	SLB	WSH
Boston	—	10–11	8–13	13–9	14–6–1	11–11	17–5	6–16
Chicago	11–10	—	9–13–1	13–9	11–10	11–11	12–10	11–11
Cleveland	13–8	13–9–1	—	14–7	14–8–1	9–13	16–6–1	7–15
Detroit	9–13	9–13	7–14	—	11–11	7–15	11–11	12–10
New York	6–14–1	10–11	8–14–1	11–11	—	5–17	11–11	6–16
Philadelphia	11–11	11–11	13–9	15–7	17–5	—	15–6	14–8
St. Louis	5–17	10–12	6–16–1	11–11	11–11	6–15	—	8–14–1
Washington	16–6	11–11	15–7	10–12	16–6	8–14	14–8–1	—

=== Opening Day lineup ===
Harry Hooper	RF
Steve Yerkes	2B
Tris Speaker	CF
Duffy Lewis	LF
Larry Gardner	3B
Hal Janvrin	1B
Heinie Wagner	SS
Hick Cady	C
Smoky Joe Wood	P

=== Roster ===
1913 Boston Red Sox
Roster
Pitchers: Fred Anderson; Hugh Bedient; Esty Chaney; Ray Collins; Rube Foster; Charley Hall; Dutch Leonard; Paul Maloy; Earl Moseley; Buck O'Brien; Smoky Joe Wood	Catchers: Hick Cady; Bill Carrigan; Les Nunamaker; Wally Snell; Pinch Thomas; Infielders: Neal Ball; Clyde Engle; Larry Gardner; Hal Janvrin; Bill Mundy; Heinie Wagner; Steve Yerkes	Outfielders: Olaf Henriksen; Harry Hooper; Wally Rehg; Duffy Lewis; Tris Speaker; Other batters: Jake Stahl	Manager: Bill Carrigan; Jake Stahl

== Player stats ==
=== Batting ===
==== Starters by position ====
Note: Pos = Position; G = Games played; AB = At bats; H = Hits; Avg. = Batting average; HR = Home runs; RBI = Runs batted in

Pos	Player	G	AB	H	Avg.	HR	RBI
C	Bill Carrigan	87	256	62	.242	0	28
1B	Clyde Engle	143	498	144	.289	2	50
2B	Steve Yerkes	137	483	129	.267	1	48
SS	Heinie Wagner	110	365	83	.227	2	34
3B	Larry Gardner	131	473	133	.281	0	63
OF	Duffy Lewis	149	551	164	.298	0	90
OF	Harry Hooper	148	586	169	.288	4	40
OF	Tris Speaker	141	520	189	.363	3	71

==== Other batters ====
Note: G = Games played; AB = At bats; H = Hits; Avg. = Batting average; HR = Home runs; RBI = Runs batted in

Player	G	AB	H	Avg.	HR	RBI
Hal Janvrin	87	276	57	.207	3	25
Wally Rehg	30	101	28	.277	0	9
Hick Cady	40	96	24	.250	0	6
Pinch Thomas	38	91	26	.286	1	15
Les Nunamaker	29	65	14	.215	0	9
Neal Ball	23	58	10	.172	0	4
Bill Mundy	16	47	12	.255	0	4
Olaf Henriksen	31	40	15	.375	0	2
Wally Snell	6	12	3	.250	0	0
Jake Stahl	2	2	0	.000	0	0

=== Pitching ===
==== Starting pitchers ====
Note: G = Games pitched; IP = Innings pitched; W = Wins; L = Losses; ERA = Earned run average; SO = Strikeouts

Player	G	IP	W	L	ERA	SO
Dutch Leonard	42	259.1	14	17	2.39	144
Hugh Bedient	43	259.0	16	14	2.78	122
Ray Collins	30	246.2	19	8	2.63	88
Joe Wood	23	145.2	11	5	2.29	123
Earl Moseley	24	120.2	8	5	3.13	62
Buck O'Brien	15	90.1	3	9	3.69	54
Fred Anderson	10	57.1	0	6	5.97	32

==== Other pitchers ====
Note: G = Games pitched; IP = Innings pitched; W = Wins; L = Losses; ERA = Earned run average; SO = Strikeouts

Player	G	IP	W	L	ERA	SO
Rube Foster	19	68.1	3	3	3.16	36

==== Relief pitchers ====
Note: G = Games pitched; W = Wins; L = Losses; SV = Saves; ERA = Earned run average; SO = Strikeouts

Player	G	W	L	SV	ERA	SO
Charley Hall	35	5	4	2	3.43	48
Paul Maloy	2	2	0	0	9.00	0
Harry Hooper	1	0	0	0	0.00	0
Duffy Lewis	1	0	0	0	18.00	1
Esty Chaney	1	1	0	0	9.00	0
