= Golden pitch =

Potential World Series-winning baseball pitch

A golden pitch refers to a pitch in a baseball game in which the outcome of the pitch could produce a World Series championship for either team. By definition, a golden pitch can only be thrown in the winner-take-all final game of the World Series (usually Game 7) and only in the bottom half of the ninth inning or a later inning when the road team has the lead, and the home team has at least one runner on base.

As of the end of the 2025 baseball season, 49 golden pitches have been thrown, by nine pitchers to 15 batters in nine different World Series: 1912, 1926, 1962, 1972, 1997, 2001, 2014, 2016, and 2025.

== Background ==
Babe Ruth of the New York Yankees is tagged out by St. Louis Cardinals second baseman Rogers Hornsby to end the 1926 World Series. Yankees batter Bob Meusel was facing a "golden pitch" from Cardinals pitcher Grover Cleveland Alexander when Ruth was caught stealing to end the game and give the Cardinals their first World Series championship.

The term was coined by Wade Kapszukiewicz, a politician from Toledo, Ohio (as of 2026 the city's mayor), who introduced the concept in an article for the Spring 2016 edition of the Society of American Baseball Research (SABR) Baseball Research Journal.

The most recent golden pitches occurred in the 2025 World Series when Los Angeles Dodgers pitcher Yoshinobu Yamamoto threw seven against the Toronto Blue Jays in the 11th inning of Game 7. After the Dodgers had taken a 5-4 lead in the top of the 11th on a home run by Will Smith, Vladimir Guerrero Jr. led off the bottom of the 11th with a double. After he advanced to third on a sacrifice bunt by Isiah Kiner-Falefa, the teams entered a golden pitch situation by which either team could win on the next pitch. The next batter, Addison Barger, reached base on a four-pitch walk. Then Alejandro Kirk stepped to the plate. He hit a foul ball and took a strike for an 0-2 count. On the third pitch of his at-bat, Kirk hit a broken-bat ground ball to Dodgers shortstop Mookie Betts, who touched second base and threw to first baseman Freddie Freeman to complete the double play and clinch the Dodgers' ninth world championship.

== Plate appearances with golden pitches ==
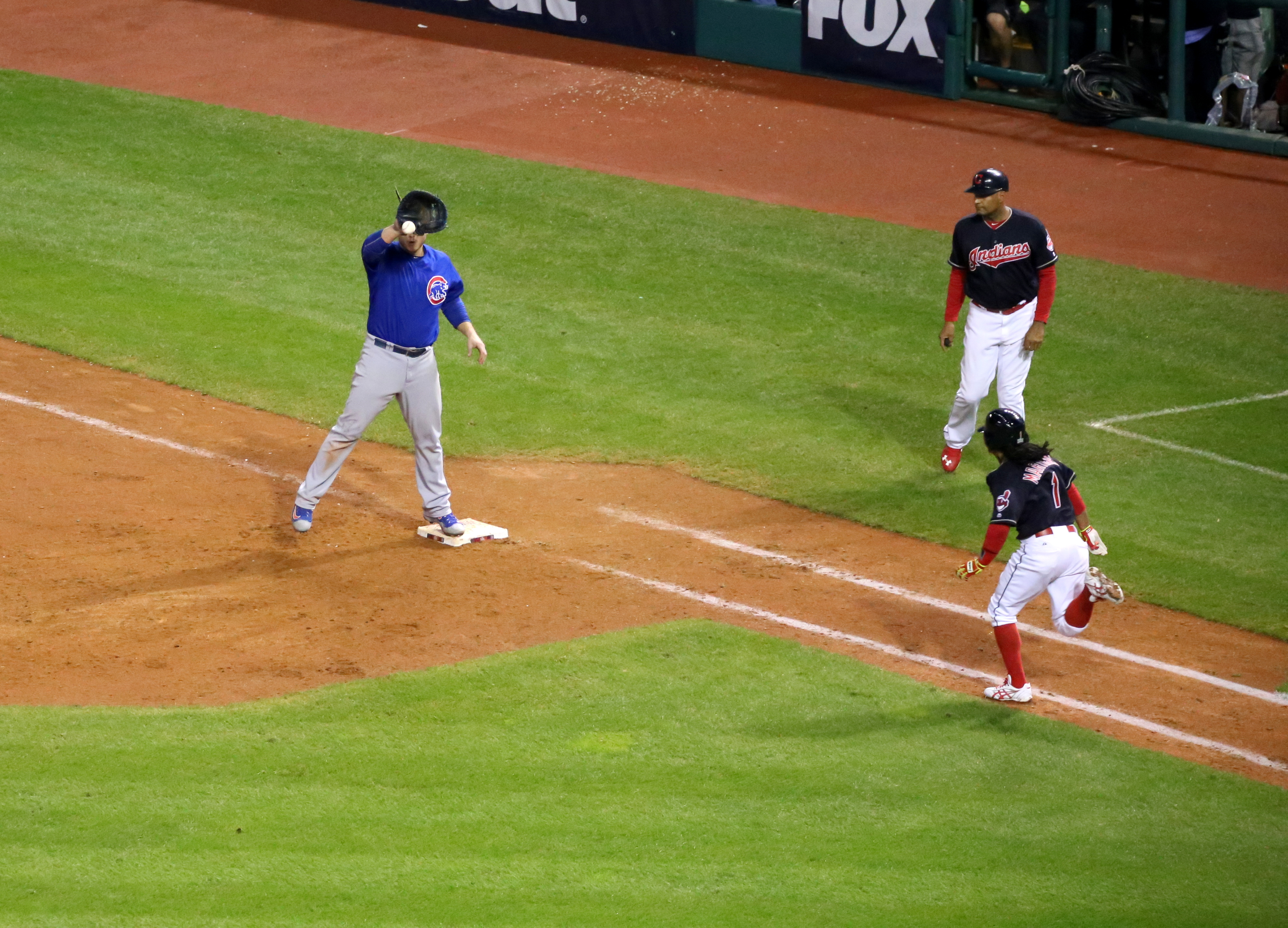
Chicago Cubs first baseman Anthony Rizzo catches the final out of the 2016 World Series, after Cleveland Indians batter Michael Martinez swung at a golden pitch from Cubs pitcher Mike Montgomery.

Of the 15 plate appearances with golden pitches, five ended with the batter getting out to end the game and the series; a sixth ended when a base runner was caught stealing. None of the 15 at-bats ended with the batting team winning the game, but three concluded with the batter hitting the ball in play and tying the game, and all three times the batting team won later in the game. Five of the 15 plate appearances occurred in extra innings: two in the 10th inning of Game 8 (Note: The 1912 World Series went eight games because Game 2 of the series had ended in a tie.) in 1912, one in the 10th inning of Game 7 in 2016, and two in the 11th inning of Game 7 in 2025.

Only once has a golden pitch situation occurred with 0 outs in an inning. In 2001 in the bottom of the ninth inning of Game 7, Mark Grace led off with a single and was replaced by pinch-runner David Dellucci. The next batter, Damian Miller, bunted the ball back to pitcher Mariano Rivera, who attempted to retire Dellucci but made an errant throw to second base, leaving two runners on and no one out. Jay Bell stepped up with a golden pitch situation, whereby a three-run home run would give the Diamondbacks the championship and a triple play would give the Yankees the series victory. Bell bunted the first pitch he saw back to Rivera, who retired Dellucci at third base for the first out. The next batter, Tony Womack, hit a double down the right-field line on a 2–2 pitch that tied the game, and Bell advanced to third. After Rivera hit Craig Counsell unintentionally with an 0–1 pitch, the bases were loaded. On an 0–1 pitch, with Matt Williams in the on-deck circle, Luis Gonzalez lofted a soft floater single over the drawn-in Derek Jeter that barely reached the outfield grass, plating Jay Bell with the winning run.

Three of the 15 batters to have faced a golden pitch are in the National Baseball Hall of Fame as of 2025: Tris Speaker, Willie Mays and Willie McCovey. Four of the nine pitchers are Hall of Famers: Christy Mathewson, Grover Cleveland Alexander, Rollie Fingers and Mariano Rivera. Three of the players involved in golden pitches were awarded the World Series MVP in the same year: Ralph Terry in 1962, Madison Bumgarner in 2014 and Yoshinobu Yamamoto in 2025. Terry has the most golden pitches of any pitcher; he threw 12 pitches to three batters to end Game 7 of the 1962 World Series.

Year	Batter, team	Pitcher, team	Score during pitches	Inning, outs, runners	# of pitches	Result of plate appearance
1912	Steve Yerkes, Boston Red Sox	Christy Mathewson, New York Giants	Giants 2–1	10th, 1 out, runner on 2nd	5	Walk
1912	Tris Speaker, Boston Red Sox	Christy Mathewson, New York Giants	Giants 2–1	10th, 1 out, runners on 1st & 2nd	2	RBI single, tie game
1926	Bob Meusel, New York Yankees	Grover Cleveland Alexander, St. Louis Cardinals	Cardinals 3–2	9th, 2 outs, runner on 1st	1	Babe Ruth caught stealing, St. Louis Cardinals win
1962	Chuck Hiller, San Francisco Giants	Ralph Terry, New York Yankees	Yankees 1–0	9th, 1 out, runner on 1st	7	Strikeout
1962	Willie Mays, San Francisco Giants	Ralph Terry, New York Yankees	Yankees 1–0	9th, 2 outs, runner on 1st	3	Double
1962	Willie McCovey, San Francisco Giants	Ralph Terry, New York Yankees	Yankees 1–0	9th, 2 outs, runners on 2nd & 3rd	2	Lineout, New York Yankees win
1972	Pete Rose, Cincinnati Reds	Rollie Fingers, Oakland A's	A's 3–2	9th, 2 outs, runner on 1st	1	Flyout, Oakland A's win
1997	Charles Johnson, Florida Marlins	José Mesa, Cleveland Indians	Indians, 2–1	9th, 1 out, runner on 1st	4	Single
1997	Craig Counsell, Florida Marlins	José Mesa, Cleveland Indians	Indians, 2–1	9th, 1 out, runners on 1st & 3rd	3	Sacrifice fly, tie game
2001	Jay Bell, Arizona Diamondbacks	Mariano Rivera, New York Yankees	Yankees 2–1	9th, 0 outs, runners on 1st & 2nd	1	Bunted fielder's choice, force out at 3rd base
2001	Tony Womack, Arizona Diamondbacks	Mariano Rivera, New York Yankees	Yankees 2–1	9th, 1 out, runners on 1st & 2nd	5	RBI double, tie game
2014	Salvador Perez, Kansas City Royals	Madison Bumgarner, San Francisco Giants	Giants 3–2	9th, 2 outs, runner on 3rd	6	Foul popout, San Francisco Giants win
2016	Michael Martinez, Cleveland Indians	Mike Montgomery, Chicago Cubs	Cubs 8–7	10th, 2 outs, runner on 1st	2	Groundout, Chicago Cubs win
2025	Addison Barger, Toronto Blue Jays	Yoshinobu Yamamoto, Los Angeles Dodgers	Dodgers 5–4	11th, 1 out, runner on 3rd	4	Walk
2025	Alejandro Kirk, Toronto Blue Jays	Yoshinobu Yamamoto, Los Angeles Dodgers	Dodgers 5–4	11th, 1 out, runners on 1st & 3rd	3	Groundout double play, Los Angeles Dodgers win
