= Clyde Engle =

American baseball player (1884–1939)

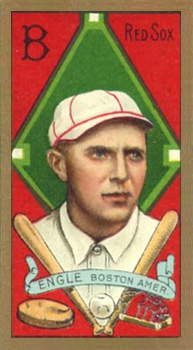
- Utility player
- Born: March 19, 1884; Dayton, Ohio, U.S.
- Died: December 26, 1939 (aged 55); Boston, Massachusetts, U.S.
- Batted: Right Threw: Right

MLB debut
- April 12, 1909, for the New York Highlanders

Last MLB appearance
- June 9, 1916, for the Cleveland Indians

MLB statistics
- Batting average: .265
- Home runs: 12
- Runs batted in: 318
- Stats at Baseball Reference

Teams
- New York Highlanders (1909–1910); Boston Red Sox (1910–1914); Buffalo Buffeds/Blues (1914–1915); Cleveland Indians (1916)

Career highlights and awards
- World Series champion (1912)

Arthur Clyde "Hack" Engle (March 19, 1884 – December 26, 1939) was an American utility player who played in Major League Baseball between 1909 and 1916. Listed at 5' 10", 190 lb., Engle batted and threw right-handed. He was born in Dayton, Ohio.

Engle was a sort of super-utility man at all positions but pitcher and catcher, playing mainly at first base and third. He entered the majors in 1909 with the New York Highlanders of the American League, playing for them one and a half seasons before joining the Boston Red Sox (1910–14). In his rookie year for New York, he hit for a .278 batting average with a career-highs of 20 doubles and 71 RBI in 135 games. His most productive season came with Boston in 1913, when he posted career-numbers in average (.289), runs (75), triples (12) and stolen bases (28). He was also a member of the Boston Red Sox 1912 World Series champion team which defeated the New York Giants in eight games.

During the 1914 midseason, Engle joined a significant number of players who jumped to the Buffalo teams of the outlaw Federal League (1914–15), returning to the American League with the Cleveland Indians in 1916, his last major league season.

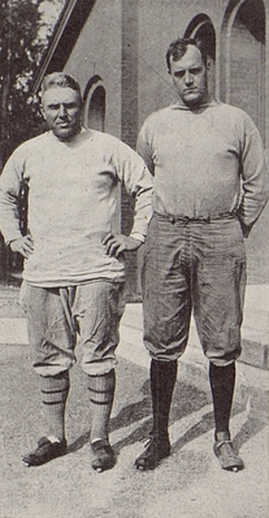
Engle (left) pictured with William P. Edmunds in Ariel 1921, Vermont yearbook

In an eight-season career, Engle was a .265 hitter (748-for-2822) with 12 home runs and 318 RBI in 836 games, including 373 runs, 101 doubles, 39 triples, 128 stolen bases, and a .335 on-base percentage. He made 748 appearances as a fielder at first base (255), third base (163), left field (142), center field (111), second base (81), right field (25) and shortstop (9).

Following his majors career, Engle was the athletic director and coached the University of Vermont football team, and he later coached the freshman baseball team at Yale University, where the coach of the varsity squad was his former teammate and close friend Smoky Joe Wood. In 1921, the Vermont baseball team needed an umpire for its season. Engle wrote his friend Dolly Stark and invited him to take the position. Stark had not previously umpired, but he accepted the position, and would go on to umpire in the National League from 1927 to 1940.

Engle died of a heart attack at The Lenox Hotel in Boston, Massachusetts on December 26, 1939.

== The 1912 World Series ==
Engle will be known forever as the man who hit the ball that Fred Snodgrass missed in the eight and final game of the 1912 World Series. The Series lasted eight games, due to a 6–6 tie in Game 2 when the game was called by darkness after 11 innings. Engle had appeared twice before during the Series in pinch-hitting duties. In Game 6, he hit a two-run RBI double off Giants pitcher Rube Marquard that scored Boston's only runs in a 5–2 losing effort. The decisive Game 8 at Fenway Park faced Joe Wood for Boston and Christy Mathewson for the New York Giants, who had broken a 1–1 tie by scoring a run in the first half of the 10th inning. The Red Sox started its half and manager Jake Stahl sent Engle to pinch-hit for pitcher Wood. Then, he hit a fly ball off Mathewson that came toward CF Snodgrass, who dropped the ball. Snodgrass made a fine catch on the next batter, Harry Hooper, but Mathewson walked Steve Yerkes, gave up a single to Tris Speaker, and Engle went on to score the tying run. Another walk to Duffy Lewis and a sacrifice fly by Larry Gardner scored Yerkes with the winning run to give Boston the game and the series.
