= Ray Collins (baseball) =

American baseball player (1887–1970)

- Pitcher
- Born: February 11, 1887; Colchester, Vermont, U.S.
- Died: January 9, 1970 (aged 82); Burlington, Vermont, U.S.
- Batted: Left Threw: Left

MLB debut
- July 19, 1909, for the Boston Red Sox

Last MLB appearance
- October 7, 1915, for the Boston Red Sox

MLB statistics
- Win–loss record: 84–62
- Earned run average: 2.51
- Strikeouts: 511
- Stats at Baseball Reference

Teams
- Boston Red Sox (1909–1915)

Career highlights and awards
- World Series champion (1912)

Ray Williston Collins (February 11, 1887 – January 9, 1970) was a starting pitcher in Major League Baseball who played his entire career for the Boston Red Sox. A native of Colchester, Vermont, Collins batted and threw left-handed. He debuted on July 19, 1909, and played his final game on October 7, 1915. He was a member of the 1912 Red Sox championship team, and also the 1915 Red Sox but did not play in that year's World Series.

== Playing career ==
A graduate of the University of Vermont, Collins was a good-hitting pitcher and an outstanding fielder, but the key to his success was his remarkable control. He consistently ranked among the American League leaders in fewest walks allowed per nine innings, finishing third in the league in 1912 (1.90), second in 1913 (1.35) and fourth in 1914 (1.85). He also averaged 16 wins from 1910 to 1914, including a combined 39 wins in 1913 and 1914. In a seven-season career, Collins posted an 84–62 record with 511 strikeouts and a 2.51 ERA in 1336 innings, including 19 shutouts and 90 complete games.

Collins became a regular in Boston rotation in 1910. In his first full season, he pitched a one-hitter against the Chicago White Sox and compiled a 13–11 record, making him the second-winningest pitcher on the Red Sox behind Eddie Cicotte (15–11). He was 3–6 at one point in 1911, but turned his season around, finishing at 11–12 with a 2.40 ERA.

Collins missed the first two months of the 1912 season with a knee injury, during which time the Red Sox christened their new stadium, Fenway Park. He did not start a game until early June, but won two games in three days over the Philadelphia Athletics at Shibe Park, 7–3 on July 3 and 5–3 on July 5. Collins finished fifth in the AL with four shutouts, by all of them came in the second half of the season. He compiled a 13–8 mark and his ERA stood at 2.53, fifth-best in the league. The only left-hander in Boston rotation, Collins was considered the second-best on the pitching staff behind Smoky Joe Wood (34–5) as the Red Sox clinched the American League pennant. Collins started Game Two of the World Series against Christy Mathewson and the New York Giants. He led 4–2 after seven innings and was pulled in the eight with only one out after the Giants rallied for three runs. The game was called on account of darkness after 11 innings with the score tied 6–6. Collins was supposed to start again in Game Six, but Red Sox manager Jake Stahl opted by Buck O'Brien, coming off a 20–13 season. The Giants shelled him for five runs in the first inning. Then, Collins relieved in the second and pitched shutout ball for seven innings in a 5–2 lost cause.

Collins enjoyed his best season yet in 1913, finishing at 19–8, as his .714 winning percentage was the second-highest in the league. In the midseason, he pitched a four-hit, 9–0 shutout and hit a home run St. Louis Browns on July 9. Later, on July 26, he pitched a five-hitter and hit a bases-loaded triple to give Boston a 4–1 victory over the Chicago White Sox. Collins also faced great Walter Johnson and the Washington Senators three times that season. Each game finished 1–0, with Collins winning two of them, including scoreless ball for 11 innings on August 29.

Collins became the ace of Boston pitching staff in 1914 with a 20–13 record and a 2.51 ERA. His six shutouts ranked him fourth in the American League that season, and he was one of only three pitchers in the league to reach the 20-win plateau, joining Walter Johnson (28) and Stan Coveleski (22). Collins picked up his 19th and 20th victories on September 22, by pitching complete games in both ends of a doubleheader against the Detroit Tigers at Navin Field, winning by scores of 5–3 in the opener and 5–0 in the nightcap.

In 1915, the Red Sox were in the enviable position of having too many good (and younger) pitchers: Rube Foster, Ernie Shore, Dutch Leonard, and Babe Ruth made up the best rotation in major league baseball. Then Collins was relegated to the bullpen. Starting only nine games, the fewest since his rookie year, Collins finished with a 4–7 record and a 4.30 ERA in 25 pitching appearances. He did not pitch a single inning in the 1915 World Series as Boston defeated the Philadelphia Phillies in five games. After the season the Red Sox expected him to take a cut in his $5400 salary, but Collins, at age 29, announced his retirement from professional baseball stating simply that he was "discouraged by his failure to show old-time form."

== Later years ==
After his playing career, Collins returned to the University of Vermont where he served as baseball coach from 1923 to 1928. During and after his baseball career, he was a dairy farmer in Colchester, Vermont, operating the family farm until 1960, and was co-founder of the Burlington Milk Cooperative Creamery (later part of HP Hood). Collins headed the Colchester draft board during World War II and represented Colchester in the Vermont House of Representatives from 1943 to 1946, serving on the agriculture and traffic committees. During the 1950s, he served on UVM's board of trustees, presiding over the school's transition from private to public university. Collins had five children with wife Lillian, the last surviving of whom (Ray Jr.) died on September 14, 2013, aged 99.

Collins died in Burlington, Vermont, at age 82.

In 2012, Collins was part of the inaugural class of the Vermont Sports Hall of Fame.
