= Sacrifice fly =

Play in baseball

In baseball, a sacrifice fly (sometimes abbreviated to sac fly) is defined by Rule 9.08(d): "Score a sacrifice fly when, before two are out, the batter hits a ball in flight handled by an outfielder or an infielder running in the outfield in fair or foul territory that

1. is caught, and a run scores after the catch, or
2. is dropped, and a runner scores, if in the scorer's judgment the runner could have scored after the catch had the fly ball been caught."

They are so named because the batter allows a teammate to score a run, while "sacrificing" their ability to do so. They are traditionally recorded in box scores with the designation "SF".

== Rules ==
As addressed within Rule 9.02(a)(1) of the Official Baseball Rules a sacrifice fly is not counted as a time at bat for the batter, though the batter is credited with a run batted in. The same is true with a bases-loaded walk or hit by pitch.

The purpose of not counting a sacrifice fly as an at-bat is to avoid penalizing hitters for a successful action. The sacrifice fly is one of two instances in baseball where a batter is not charged with a time at bat after putting a ball in play; the other is the sacrifice bunt (also known as a sacrifice hit). But, while a sacrifice fly does not affect a player's batting average, it counts as a plate appearance and lowers the on-base percentage. A player on a hitting streak will have it end with no official at-bats but a sacrifice fly.

Unlike a sacrifice bunt, which may be scored if a runner advances from any base to any base, a sacrifice fly is credited only if a runner scores on the play. Therefore, when a runner on first or second base tags on a fly ball and advances no further than third base, no sacrifice is given, and the batter is charged with an at-bat. Also, if a runner tags and advances from second base (or, theoretically, from first base) all the way to home and scores (without an intervening error), the batter is credited with a sacrifice fly, as well as with a second RBI if a runner on third also scores. At the professional level this will typically occur only in unusual circumstances that prevent the defense from making an immediate throw back to the infield, such as an outfielder colliding with the wall while making a catch on the warning track or a fly ball caught at the deepest part of the yard. It can also happen if two very fast baserunners occupy 2nd and 3rd base, such as when Willie McGee and Ozzie Smith scored on Tom Herr's sacrifice fly in the 1982 World Series.

The sacrifice fly is credited even if another runner is put out, so long as the run scores. The sacrifice fly is credited on a dropped ball even if another runner is forced out by reason of the batter becoming a runner.

== Records ==
The most sacrifice flies by a team in one game in Major League Baseball (MLB) is five; the record was established by the Seattle Mariners in 1988, tied by the Colorado Rockies in 2006, and tied again by the Mariners in 2008. The record was most recently tied by the Baltimore Orioles in a 16-4 victory against the Toronto Blue Jays on July 29, 2025.

Five MLB teams have collected three sacrifice flies in an inning: the Chicago White Sox (fifth inning, July 1, 1962, against the Cleveland Indians); the New York Yankees twice (fourth inning, June 29, 2000, against the Detroit Tigers and third inning, August 19, 2000, against the Anaheim Angels); the New York Mets (second inning, June 24, 2005, against the Yankees); and the Houston Astros (seventh inning, June 26, 2005, against the Texas Rangers). In these cases one or more of the flies did not result in a putout due to an error.

Since the rule was reinstated in its present form in MLB in 1954, Gil Hodges of the Dodgers holds the record for most sacrifice flies in one season with 19, in 1954; Eddie Murray holds the MLB record for most sacrifice flies in a career with 128.

As of the end of the 2024 MLB season, the ten players with the most career sacrifice flies are:

1. Eddie Murray (128)
2. Cal Ripken Jr. (127)
3. Robin Yount (123)
3. Albert Pujols (123)
5. Hank Aaron (121)
5. Frank Thomas (121)
7. George Brett (120)
7. Rubén Sierra (120)
9. Rafael Palmeiro (119)
9. Rusty Staub (119)

Only once has the World Series been won on a sac fly. In 1912, Larry Gardner of the Boston Red Sox hit a fly ball off New York Giants' pitcher Christy Mathewson. Steve Yerkes tagged up and scored from third base to win game 8 in the 10th inning and take the series for the Red Sox.

== History ==
Batters have not been charged with a time at-bat for a sacrifice hit since 1893, but baseball has changed the sacrifice fly rule multiple times. The sacrifice fly as a statistical category was instituted in 1908, only to be discontinued in 1931. The rule was again adopted in 1939, only to be eliminated again in 1940, before being adopted for the last time in 1954. For some baseball fans, it is significant that the sacrifice-fly rule was eliminated in 1940 because, in 1941, Ted Williams was hitting .39955 on the last day of the season and needed one hit in a doubleheader against the Philadelphia A's to become the first hitter since Bill Terry in 1930 to hit .400. He got six hits, finishing with an official .406 average, the last player in over 80 years to bat .400 or more in the American or National League. In his book Baseball and Other Matters in 1941 author Robert Creamer, citing estimates, points out that if Williams' 14 at-bats on sacrifice flies that year were deducted from the 456 official at-bats he was charged with, his final average in 1941 would have been .419.
