= Dolly Stark (umpire) =

American baseball umpire (1897-1968)

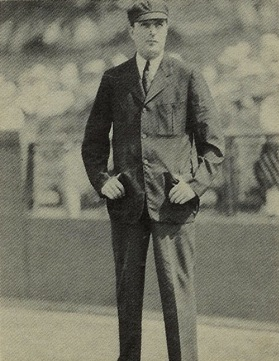
- Stark in 1939
- Born: November 4, 1897; New York City, U.S.
- Died: August 24, 1968 (aged 70); New York City, U.S.
- Occupation: Baseball umpire
- Years active: 1928–1935, 1937–1940
- Employer: National League
- Height: 5 ft 10 in (1.78 m)

Albert D. "Dolly" Stark (November 4, 1897 – August 24, 1968) was an American umpire in Major League Baseball who worked in the National League from 1928 to 1935 and from 1937 to 1940. Stark was the first Jewish umpire in modern baseball.

== Early life ==
Stark was born to a working-class Jewish family in Manhattan's Lower East Side. Stark's father died when he was young and his mother became blind, and Stark was taken into a home for homeless children after being found sleeping on the street by a policeman. After leaving the home, Stark attempted to earn money for his family through playing baseball, and was nicknamed "Dolly" in a reference to Monroe "Dolly" Stark, an unrelated player for the Brooklyn Superbas. He was childhood friends with future Major League player Al Schacht.

Stark played second base for several semipro and minor league teams, including the Newark Bears, Kitchener Beavers, Dallas Submarines and Jersey City Skeeters. He attended tryouts for the New York Yankees and Washington Senators, but failed both, in part due to his weight of only 115 pounds (52 kg).

Clyde Engle was the athletic director at the University of Vermont in 1921 when the baseball team needed an umpire for the season. Engle wrote his friend Stark and invited him to take the position. Stark had never previously umpired, accepted the position, and arrived in Burlington, Vermont on April 25, 1921. Stark would continue to umpire. He was umpiring in the Eastern League in 1927 when his performance was noticed and he was promoted to the National League to succeed Hank O'Day.

== Career ==
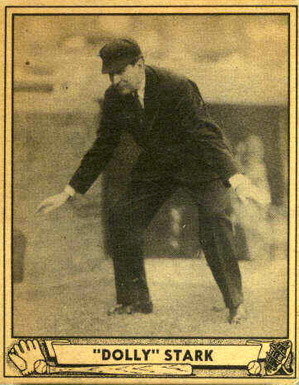
Stark's 1940 Play Ball baseball card

As an umpire, Stark was known for being active and mobile, and constantly working to improve himself. He was the first to move around in order to be in position to make the right call. A player favorite, he was voted the most competent umpire by National League players in a 1934 poll sponsored by the Sporting News. In August 1935, league President Ford Frick presented Stark with a new automobile at "Dolly Stark Day" before a New York Giants game at the Polo Grounds. This was the first and only time a "Day" has been held in honor of a Major League Baseball umpire.

Stark briefly resigned multiple times in his umpiring career. The first instance was midway through the 1928 season; Stark believed that he was not sufficiently doing his job as an umpire, but was talked out of this decision by fellow umpire Bill Klem. The second instance was after the 1929 season, due to Stark's self-described "torments of umpiring", although he returned once again in 1930.

In 1936, Stark held out from umpiring, becoming the first known umpire to quit due to salary issues. (Stark was being paid $9,000 per year at the time, which is equivalent to $160,000 in 2024.). Stark told commissioner Ford Frick that he was not being paid adequately for his services, saying, "Unless the league sees fit to pay me a lot more money, I'm done. I want to do bigger work than umpiring and I want to get bigger money. I hope I can stay in baseball, either as a manager or business manager." Stark ultimately spent the year as a radio broadcaster for the Philadelphia Phillies and Philadelphia Athletics.

== Outside umpiring ==
In addition to his umpiring career, Stark coached basketball at Dartmouth College from 1923 until 1936, and was also a college umpire and basketball referee. He was coaching Dartmouth at the time that he was appointed a National League umpire. In 1936, he teamed with Bill Dyer to form the Philadelphia Phillies' first radio announcing crew on WCAU.

Stark returned to umpiring in 1937, but ultimately retired in 1940 due to a knee issue. He attempted to find work as a scout, but was largely unsuccessful. (However, Stark was instrumental in getting Saul Rogovin a tryout with the New York Giants in 1944). Stark did find success as a women's clothing designer, starting a line called the "Dolly Stark Dress." He also worked in other fields including textiles, stocks and bonds, and broadcasting. He was also the co-host of Your Sports Special, a sports news and interview show on CBS from 1948 until 1949.

== Personal life ==
Stark's personal life included much tragedy; he was forced to spend large sums of money to support his blind mother, and his sister, who was constantly in poor health and ultimately committed suicide. His marriage to Betsy Lee in 1952 ended in divorce after 4 years, and Stark was in poor financial shape in his later life, forcing him to apply for unemployment compensation in 1968.

Stark died of a heart attack in New York City on August 24, 1968.

== See also ==
- List of Major League Baseball umpires (disambiguation)
