= Chief Meyers =

American baseball player (1880–1971)

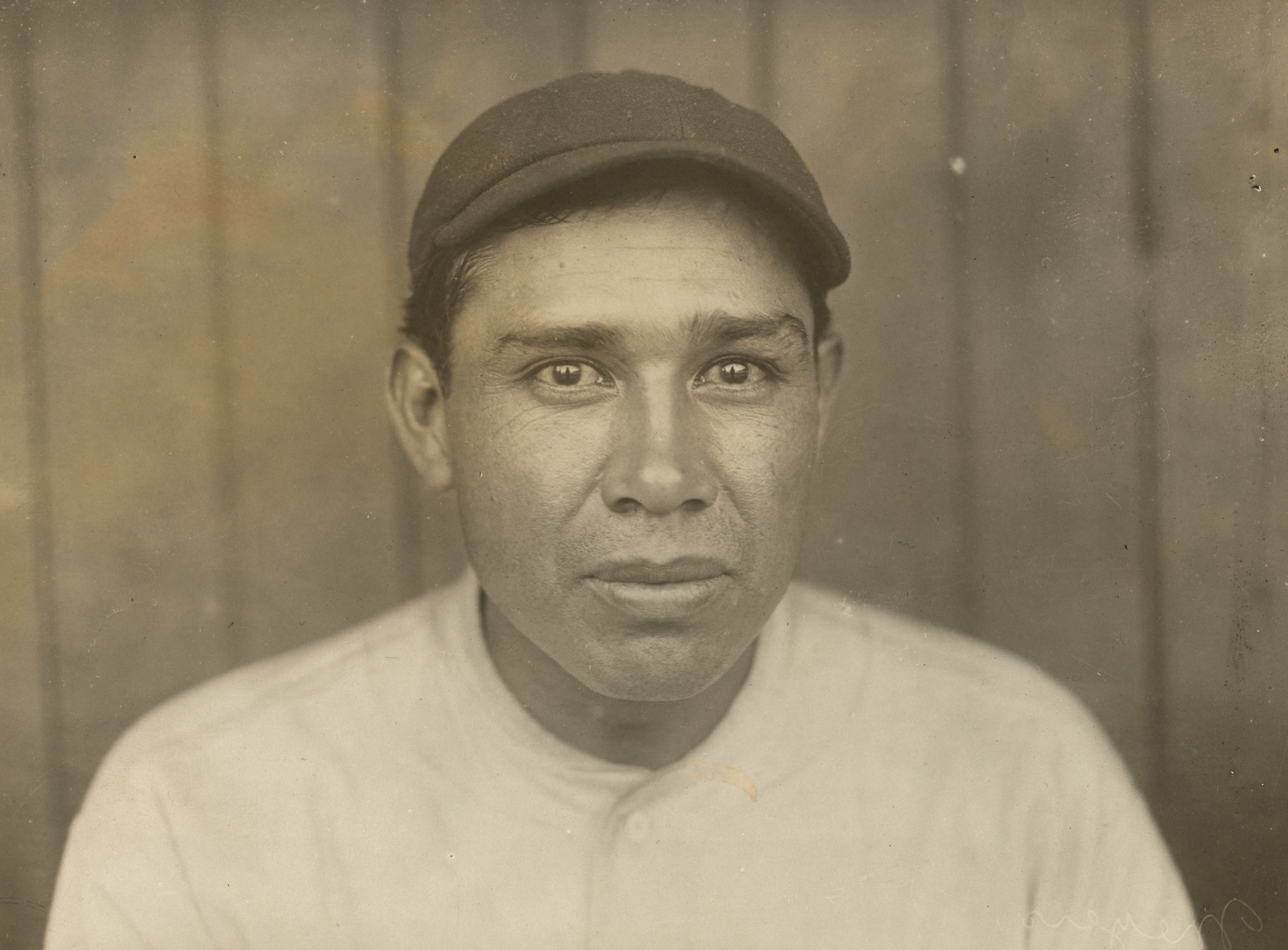
- Meyers in 1910
- Catcher
- Born: July 29, 1880; Riverside, California, U.S.
- Died: July 25, 1971 (aged 90); San Bernardino, California, U.S.
- Batted: Right Threw: Right

MLB debut
- April 15, 1909, for the New York Giants

Last MLB appearance
- October 4, 1917, for the Boston Braves

MLB statistics
- Batting average: .291
- Home runs: 14
- Runs batted in: 369
- Stats at Baseball Reference

Teams
- New York Giants (1909–1915); Brooklyn Robins (1916–1917); Boston Braves (1917)

John Tortes "Chief" Meyers (July 29, 1880 – July 25, 1971) was an American Major League Baseball catcher for the New York Giants, Boston Braves, and Brooklyn Robins (more widely known as the Brooklyn Dodgers) from 1909 to 1917. He played on the early Giants teams under manager John McGraw and was the primary catcher for Hall of Famer Christy Mathewson. Meyers hit over .300 for three straight years as the Giants won three straight National League pennants from 1911 to 1913. Overall, he played in four World Series – the 1911, 1912, and 1913 Series with the Giants, as well as the 1916 Series with the Robins. Meyers was a Native American from the Cahuilla culture of California, and he was educated at Dartmouth College.

== Early years ==
Meyers was born to John Meyer, a German American Civil War veteran from Terre Haute, Indiana and Felicite Meyer, a Cahuilla basket maker, in Riverside, California. At the age of seven, his father died; John Meyers continued to live in Riverside, and attended Riverside High School. Meyers was playing baseball in a 1905 summer tournament when Ralph Glaze, a former pitcher, noticed his talent and convinced Dartmouth alumni to provide Meyers with cash, railroad tickets, and a doctored high school diploma. Meyers had not graduated, but the fake diploma got him into Dartmouth. While attending classes and playing baseball, Dartmouth discovered that his diploma was forged. Not wanting to complete a special program to be reinstated into Dartmouth, Meyers signed a baseball contract with an independent league.

== New York Giants ==
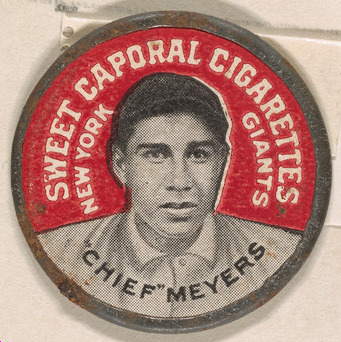
Domino Disc, issued by Kinney Brothers Tobacco Co.

After playing a couple years in various leagues, Meyers was a rookie with the New York Giants in 1908, at age 28. Meyers and the Giants lost the pennant that year due to "Merkle's Boner."

The following year, the Giants traded away Roger Bresnahan, the best catcher in the league, to the St. Louis Cardinals, which gave the young catcher an opportunity to display his talent, and Meyers didn't disappoint. In 1910, Meyers was hitting .285 making a name for himself throughout the league. Meyers was big and strong, and like the majority of other catchers, wasn't blessed with speed. He hit for power and average. Meyers led the Giants in batting for three consecutive seasons. He was a student of the game, predicting pitchers' pitches and location.

Facing elimination against the Athletics in Game 6 of the 1911 World Series, Meyers' Giants trailed 6–1 entering the bottom of the seventh in Philadelphia. After Chief Bender opened the frame with a flyout, two singles and an error by first baseman Fred Merkle fielding a throw on a sacrifice bunt made the score 7–1. Two consecutive singles would score two further runs, then with runners at the corners, Harry Davis hit a 2–1 pitch into right-center to make it 10–1. Continuing the rally, Jack Barry hit a ground rule double into the right field crowd scoring another run and putting runners at second and third, which finally convinced John McGraw to replace his pitcher, Hooks Wiltse, having given up 7 earned runs over 2 1/3 innings. Future Hall of Famer Rube Marquard, who had gone 24–7 that year with a 2.50 ERA and a career-high 237 strikeouts, came into pitch with two runners in scoring position and his team down by ten. His third pitch was so fast and wild that it "dented the screen in the grand stand". Both runners scored on the play because Meyers "refused to chase the ball", instead "glaring at Marquard" in obvious frustration. After a "heated conference" between the battery mates near home plate, order ensued, but the next batter promptly singled off Marquard. The emotional and adrenaline-fueled Meyers then threw out the runner trying to steal second base, stopping the rally. The next batter struck out, ending the inning, although the 11-run lead would prove enough to secure a championship for Philadelphia.

Meyers had his greatest success in the 1912 season, hitting .358 and finishing third in the MVP award voting. His .441 on-base percentage led the league. Meyers was also a key player in that year's World Series versus the Boston Red Sox, which featured the infamous "Snodgrass Muff" as well as captivating performances by Mathewson and Smoky Joe Wood.

=== Mathewson and Meyers ===
Meyers was the primary catcher for Hall of Fame pitcher Christy Mathewson. In only two years of playing Major League Baseball, Meyers teamed up with the great Christy Mathewson, putting on a sketch entitled "Curves", written by their co-star May Tully. The half-hour sketch included both Mathewson and Meyers explaining the art of their position. This wasn't the only project they teamed up for, as both Mathewson and Meyers would act in another sketch which toured for several weeks.

== Late career ==
At the age of 35—Meyers claimed that he was younger than he actually was—his performance started to decline as he batted just .232, and Giants placed him on waivers. In 1916, he played 80 games for the Brooklyn Robins, batting .247 with 21 RBIs. In 1917, be played 47 games for the Robins, and 25 games for the Boston Braves. Overall for the 1917 season, he batted .225 with 7 RBIs.

After getting cut in 1918, Meyers joined the Buffalo Bisons of the International League; he batted .328 in 65 games. In 1919, Meyers was hired as player-manager of the New Haven Weissmen in the Eastern League; he batted .301 in 84 games. After getting replaced by Danny Murphy, Meyers' last stop in baseball was catching for a semipro team in San Diego in 1920. After getting booed at a semipro game, Meyers decided to quit baseball and became a police chief for the Mission Indian Agency.

== Personal life ==
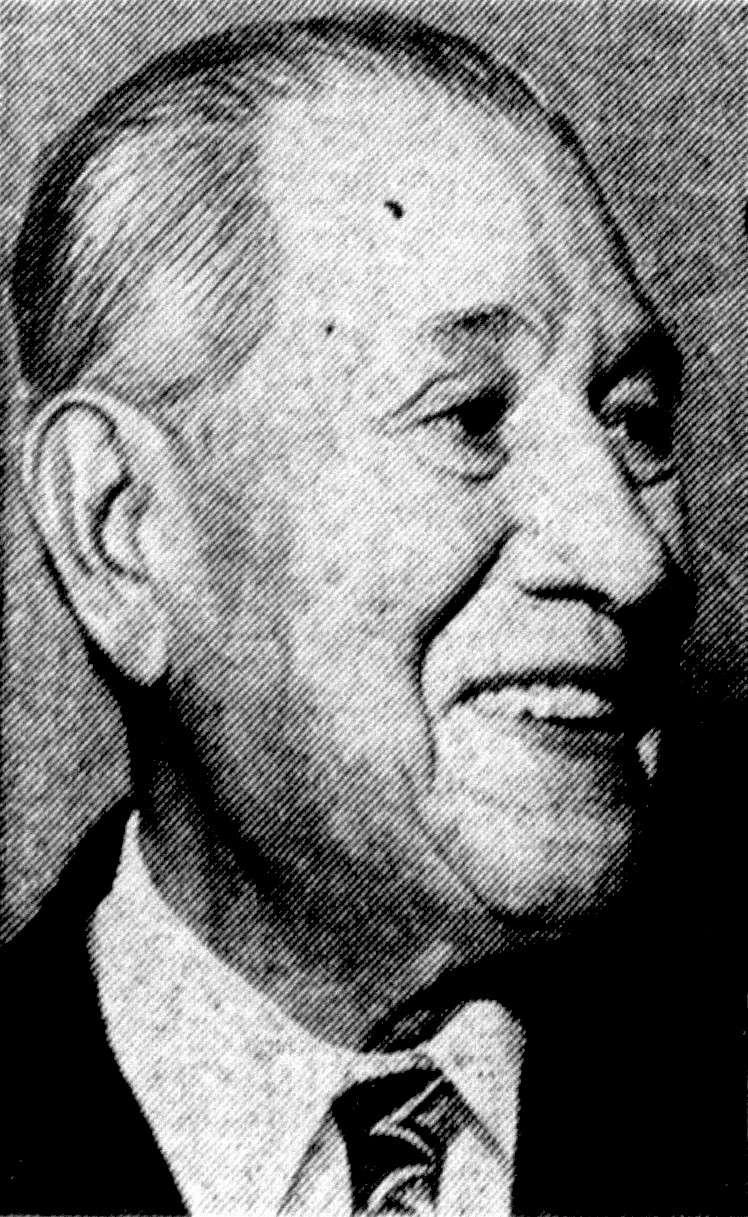
Meyers, circa 1951

The media displayed affection for the Native American ball player because he was interesting and original. On off-days or rain outs, Meyers would visit historical monuments, watch local college teams practice, and frequently visited museums and exhibits.

Meyers was interviewed by Lawrence Ritter for The Glory of Their Times in March 1964. This brought him a great deal of fame, years after he had left baseball. Lawrence Ritter told a story that Chief Meyers would stay with the L.A. Dodgers when they stayed at the Biltmore Hotel (currently located at 22 Vanderbilt Ave. near Grand Central Station) and they would ride the Dodger bus to go to the games at Shea Stadium. Meyers was not employed by the Dodgers but the owner, Walter O'Malley, let him travel with the team on the team's expense. Meyers loved it because he loved being around baseball. One time, he sat next to Maury Wills on the bus and they talked baseball. Walter O'Malley had a bad reputation by some because he was blamed for taking the Dodgers out of Brooklyn but he at least he was kind to Meyers.

Meyers died in 1971 and was interred at Green Acres Memorial Park in Bloomington, California. His grave marker indicates he served as a private in the United States Marine Corps during World War I.

== See also ==
- List of Major League Baseball players to hit for the cycle

Achievements
Preceded by Tris Speaker	Hitting for the cycle June 10, 1912	Succeeded by Bert Daniels
