= Jeff Tesreau =

American baseball player (1888-1946)

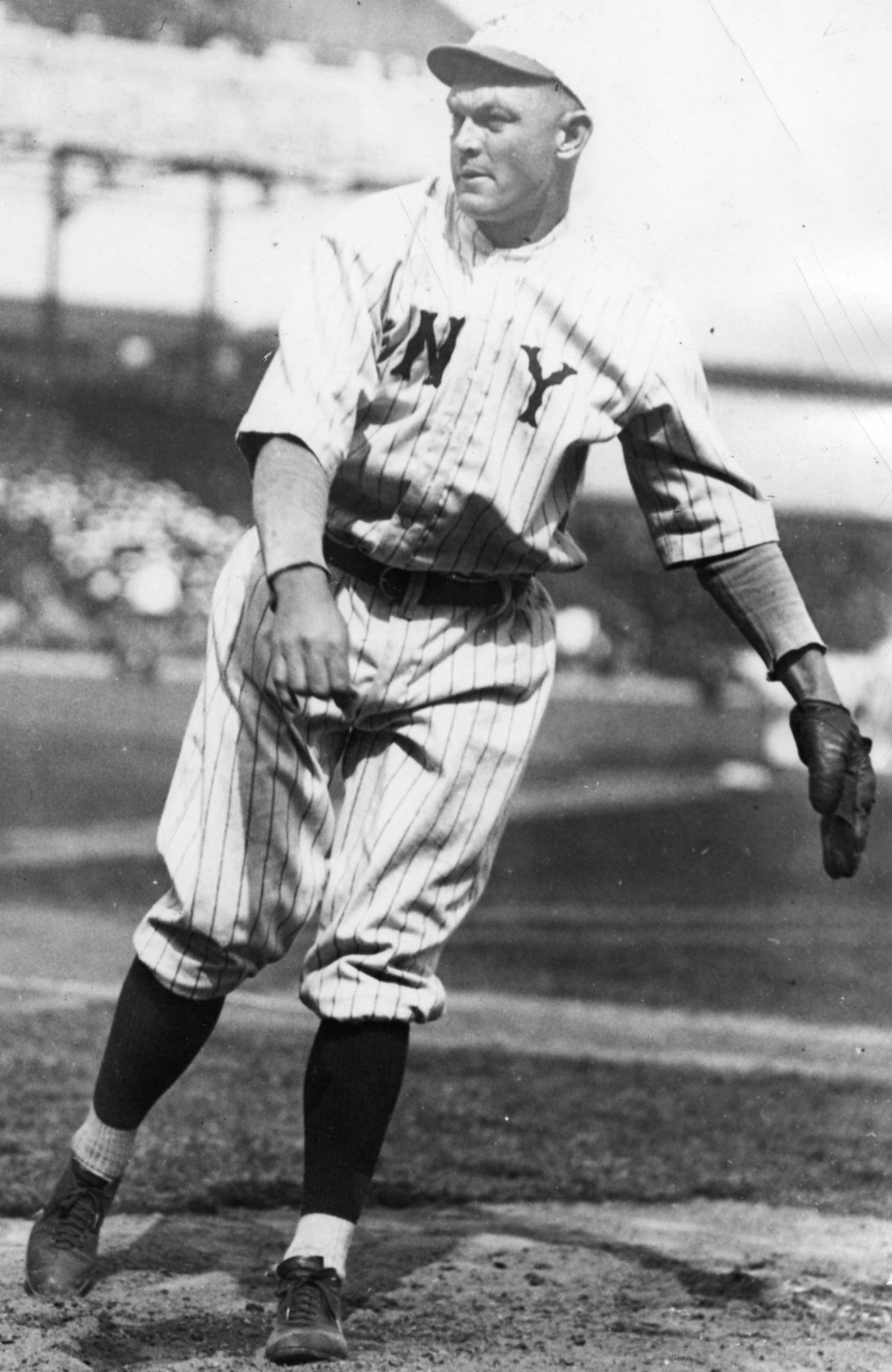
- Pitcher
- Born: March 5, 1888; Ironton, Missouri, U.S.
- Died: September 24, 1946 (aged 58); Hanover, New Hampshire, U.S.
- Batted: Right Threw: Right

MLB debut
- April 12, 1912, for the New York Giants

Last MLB appearance
- June 11, 1918, for the New York Giants

MLB statistics
- Win–loss record: 115–72
- Earned run average: 2.43
- Strikeouts: 880
- Stats at Baseball Reference

Teams
- New York Giants (1912–1918)

Career highlights and awards
- NL ERA leader (1912); Pitched a no-hitter on September 6, 1912

Charles Monroe "Jeff" Tesreau (March 5, 1888 – September 24, 1946) was an American Major League Baseball (MLB) player. Standing 6 ft 2 in (1.88 m), Tesreau was given the nickname "Jeff" because he resembled boxer Jim Jeffries. He made his MLB debut in 1912.

== Early life ==
Charles Monroe "Jeff" Tesreau was born on March 5, 1888, in Ironton, Missouri.

== Professional career ==
=== Minor leagues ===
Tesreau initially signed with a minor league team of the St. Louis Browns in 1909. In 1910, his contract was purchased by the New York Giants.

After two years in the minors, Tesreau learned how to throw a spitball, which became his signature pitch.

=== New York Giants (1912–1918) ===
He started the second game of the 1912 season for the Giants. The New York Times wrote, "Tesreau has curves which bend like barrel hoops and speed like lightning. He's just the kind of a strong man McGraw has been looking for." Tesreau finished his rookie season with 17–7 record and on September 6 he would no-hit the Philadelphia Phillies, 3-0. He also had a National League leading ERA of 1.96. Earned run average officially became a statistic of Major League Baseball in 1912, and Tesreau, along with the American League's Walter Johnson, became the first players recognized for leading the major leagues in that category. That season he also led the NL in hits per 9 innings pitched (6.566); he also led the league in that category in 1913 (7.085) and 1914 (6.645).

From 1912 to 1917, Tesreau remained a starting pitcher with the Giants. In 1918, he had an argument with manager John McGraw and quit the team in the middle of the season. In 1919, Tesreau refused to play for the Giants, and McGraw refused to trade or release him. He would not play another game in the major leagues.

In his career he was 119-72 (.623) with a 2.43 ERA.

Tesreau held his opponents to a .224 batting average in his career, which was lower than Walter Johnson (.227), Christy Mathewson (.245) and Pete Alexander (.250) although each pitched considerably longer than Tesreau.

He was also a better than average hitting pitcher, posting a .216 batting average (124-for-574) with 40 runs, 2 home runs and 46 RBI. In six World Series games, he hit .300 (3-for-10) with 2 RBI. His highest salary, in the 1915-17 seasons, was $6,300.

=== 1912 World Series ===
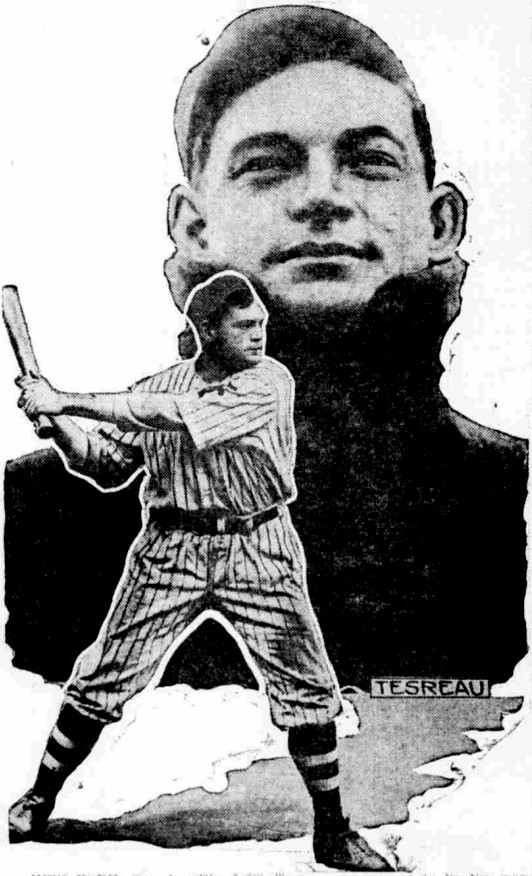
Tesreau c. 1912

In the 1912 World Series, Tesreau started three times, each against Boston Red Sox ace Smoky Joe Wood, and registered a 1–2 record for the Series. He started Game 1 of the Series and was credited with the loss in the 4-3 defeat but did not allow a hit for 5.1 innings (a triple by Tris Speaker broke up the no-hit bid). It is the longest no-hit bid by a rookie pitcher in World Series history and no rookie pitcher would throw five innings of no-hit ball in a Series start again until Ian Anderson in 2021. His performance stood as the longest postseason no-hit bid by a rookie for 101 years until Michael Wacha broke the mark in 2013. He was also credited with the loss in Game 4 before bouncing back in Game 7 (which due to a tie in Game 2 meant that the Series was even at three apiece), although the Giants lost in the decisive Game 8 the next day.

== Post-playing career ==
Tesreau became the baseball coach for the Dartmouth Big Green baseball team of Dartmouth College, in 1919, a position he held until his death on September 24, 1946. He won 348 games as coach for Dartmouth, often coaching against Smoky Joe Wood, who had become the baseball coach for Yale University. He won four Eastern Intercollegiate Baseball League titles and was the alltime wins leader until he was passed by Bob Whalen decades later.

== Death ==
Tesreau suffered a stroke while on a fishing trip in 1946. He died four days later.

== See also ==
- List of Major League Baseball annual ERA leaders
- List of Major League Baseball no-hitters

Preceded by Earl Hamilton	No-hitter pitcher September 6, 1912	Succeeded by Joe Benz
