= Buck O'Brien =

American baseball player (1882–1959)

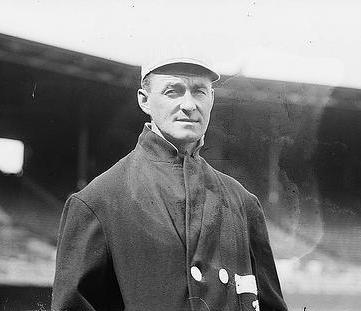
- Pitcher
- Born: May 9, 1882; Brockton, Massachusetts, U.S.
- Died: July 25, 1959 (aged 77); Boston, Massachusetts, U.S.
- Batted: Right Threw: Right

MLB debut
- September 9, 1911, for the Boston Red Sox

Last MLB appearance
- August 6, 1913, for the Chicago White Sox

MLB statistics
- Win–loss record: 29-25
- Earned run average: 2.62
- Strikeouts: 204
- Stats at Baseball Reference

Teams
- Boston Red Sox (1911–1913); Chicago White Sox (1913)

Thomas Joseph "Buck" O'Brien (May 9, 1882 – July 25, 1959) was an American starting pitcher in Major League Baseball who played for the Boston Red Sox and Chicago White Sox.

O'Brien got a late start in professional baseball. However, as a spitballer, he did have tremendous success for a few years. In 1910, when he was 28 years old, he went 20–10 for Hartford of the Connecticut State League. In 1911, he was 26–7 for the Western League's Denver Grizzlies, leading the league in winning percentage and strikeouts. The Grizzlies won 111 games en route to the league championship. In September of that year, O'Brien made his major league debut with the Red Sox and went 5–1 with a 0.38 earned run average.

The next season, he was in the starting rotation, including the first game ever played at Fenway Park on April 20, 1912. In 34 starts and 275 innings pitched, O'Brien won 20 games with a 2.58 ERA and 115 strikeouts; he finished in the top 10 in the American League in all five categories.

The Red Sox went 105–47 to win the AL pennant. O'Brien started Game 3 of the 1912 World Series against the New York Giants, but lost. Boston eventually took a 3–1 series lead, with ace pitcher Smokey Joe Wood slated to start Game 6. However, club owner Jimmy McAleer wanted the series to go back to Boston so he could get the gate receipts; he ordered manager Jake Stahl to start O'Brien instead of Wood. Buck, not knowing that he was going to pitch, was hungover the day of the game. He gave up three earned runs in the first inning, and Boston lost. Despite this, the Red Sox ended up defeating the Giants.

By the next season, hitters seemed to have O'Brien's spitball figured out. He went 4–9 before being sold to the White Sox, and just one year after winning 20 games, his major league career ended.

O'Brien died in Boston at age 77.

== Personal life ==
Buck had five sons, Thomas "Buck" O’Brien, Billy O’Brien who was killed in the Battle of the Bulge, Robert O’Brien (who was killed in an accident as a child), Francis, and John (Bucky) O’Brien. He also had three daughters Rose Moran, Marguerite O’Brien, and Joan Murray.

John O’Brien had six children, Jacqueline Levangie (three children Philip, Shannon, and Tara); Kathleen Johnson (one child Sean, and Sean's daughter Calla); Joseph O’Brien (hall of fame member at Boston College for pitching and quarterback, two sons Joseph and Michael), GiGi Green (three sons Joe, Patrick, and Brendan); John O’Brien (three girls Genevieve, KellyRose, and Brenna); and Thomas J. O’Brien (daughter Brehan and son Jake who was captain of BU's basketball team.)

Rose Moran had four children, Billy, Brian, Maureen, and Nancy.

Joan Murray had three, Peter, Steven, and Christine.
