= Matthew Williams =

Matthew or Matt Williams may refer to:

== Sports ==
=== Baseball ===
- Matt Williams (right-handed pitcher) (born 1959), American Major League Baseball player
- Matt Williams (third baseman) (born 1965), American Major League Baseball player and manager
- Matt Williams (left-handed pitcher) (born 1971), American Major League Baseball player
- Matthew Williams (baseball) (born 1987), Australian baseball player

=== Rugby ===
- Matt Williams (rugby union coach) (born 1960), Australian rugby union coach
- Matt Williams (rugby union, born 1988), English rugby union player
- Matt Williams (rugby union, born 1998), English rugby union player

=== Other sports ===
- Matthew Williams (footballer) (born 1982), Welsh footballer
- Matt Williams (equestrian) (born 1985), Australian show jumper
- Matthew Williams (cricketer) (born 1990), Zimbabwean cricketer
- Matt Williams (basketball) (born 1993), American basketball player
- Matt Williams (American football) (fl. 2008–2010), American football placekicker for the Texas Tech Red Raiders

== Politics ==
- Matt Williams (Australian politician) (born 1973)
- Matt Williams (Nebraska politician) (born 1949)

== Other ==
- Matthew Williams (laborer) (1908–1931), lynching victim in the United States
- Matthew Williams (designer) (born 1985), fashion designer
- Matthew O. Williams (born 1981), U.S. Army soldier and Medal of Honor recipient
- Matt Williams (Internet entrepreneur) (born 1972), Internet entrepreneur
- Matt Williams (producer) (born 1951), television producer
- Matt Williams (radio presenter) (born 1971), BBC radio sports reporter and presenter
- Matt Williams, archaeologist, member of the Time Team, and Digging for Britain presenter
- Matt Williams (guitarist), guitarist for Chicago rock band Post Animal

== Fictional characters ==
- Matt Robinson, also known as Matt Williams, fictional character in the Australian soap opera Neighbours
- Matthew Williams, personification of Canada in the anime Hetalia by Hidekaz Himaruya
