= Hugh Bedient =

American baseball player (1889–1965)

- Pitcher
- Born: October 23, 1889; Gerry, New York, U.S.
- Died: July 21, 1965 (aged 75); Jamestown, New York, U.S.
- Batted: Right Threw: Right

MLB debut
- April 26, 1912, for the Boston Red Sox

Last MLB appearance
- September 29, 1915, for the Buffalo Blues

MLB statistics
- Win–loss record: 59–53
- Earned run average: 3.08
- Strikeouts: 420
- Stats at Baseball Reference

Teams
- Boston Red Sox (1912–1914); Buffalo Blues (1915)

Career highlights and awards
- World Series champion (1912)

Hugh Carpenter Bedient (October 23, 1889 – July 21, 1965) was an American starting pitcher who played in the American League for the Boston Red Sox (1912–1914) and with the Buffalo Blues of the Federal League (1915). Bedient batted and threw right-handed.

== Baseball career ==
=== Semi-pro ===
Pitching for a semi-professional team based in Falconer, New York, on July 25, 1908, Bedient struck out 42 batters in a 23-inning, 3–1 victory against a team from Corry, Pennsylvania. Two days later, the Jamestown Evening Journal ran the headline: "Broke all records. Bedient of Falconer struck out 42 men", and the Corry Journal stated, "Corry and Falconer make World's record."

=== Professional ===
Bedient was selected by Boston Red Sox from Fall River (New England League) in the major league draft on September 1, 1910. He made his major league debut in 1912. He won 20 games as a Red Sox rookie and outdueled legend Christy Mathewson, defeating the New York Giants, 2–1, in Game Five of the 1912 World Series. He also pitched the first seven innings of the final game, won by the Red Sox in the tenth, 3–2.

His hometown honored his return in October 1912 with a parade and celebration.

In three seasons with the Red Sox, Bedient had a mark of 44 wins and 35 losses with 314 strikeouts and a 3.05 earned run average in 667 1/3 innings pitched. He later became a member of the outlaw Federal League. Pitching for the Buffalo Blues, he went 16–18 with 106 strikeouts and a 3.12 ERA in 269 1/3 innings, leading the league with 10 saves.

During the 1915 season, Bedient pitched for the Buffalo Blues of the outlaw major league called the Federal League.

=== Minor league ===
Bedient played a significant time in the minor leagues, as follows:

- 1910 - Fall River (New England League)
- 1911 - Providence (Eastern League)
- 1916 - 1917 and 1921 - 1923 - Toledo (American Association)
- 1924 - Portland (Pacific Coast League)
- 1925 - Atlanta (Southern Association)

== Later life ==
After leaving baseball, Bedient owned a farm in Levant, a hamlet of Jamestown, New York. He was buried at Levant Cemetery in Poland, Chautauqua County, New York.

== Memorial ==
A memorial marker is located a Falconer, New York, in the Falconer Park baseball field on Mosher Street, where Bedient once played.

== See also ==
- List of Major League Baseball annual saves leaders
