= Larry Gardner =

American baseball player (1886–1976)

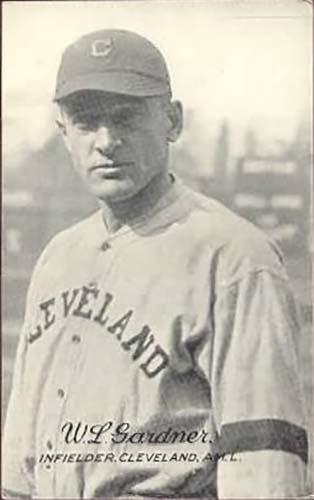
- Third baseman
- Born: May 13, 1886; Enosburg Falls, Vermont, U.S.
- Died: March 11, 1976 (aged 89); St. George, Vermont, U.S.
- Batted: Left Threw: Right

MLB debut
- June 25, 1908, for the Boston Red Sox

Last MLB appearance
- September 6, 1924, for the Cleveland Indians

MLB statistics
- Batting average: .289
- Home runs: 27
- Runs batted in: 934
- Stats at Baseball Reference

Teams
- Boston Red Sox (1908–1917); Philadelphia Athletics (1918); Cleveland Indians (1919–1924)

Career highlights and awards
- 4× World Series champion (1912, 1915, 1916, 1920); Boston Red Sox Hall of Fame

William Lawrence Gardner (May 13, 1886 – March 11, 1976) was an American third baseman in Major League Baseball. From 1908 through 1924, Gardner played for the Boston Red Sox, Philadelphia Athletics, and Cleveland Indians. He was a four-time World Series champion.

== Biography ==
Gardner was born in Enosburg, Vermont, and attended Enosburg High School. He began playing baseball in the Franklin County League and attended the University of Vermont where he played baseball for three years. He was the first player out of the University of Vermont to play in the American League. Gardner was signed by the Boston Red Sox as an amateur free agent in 1908, and played his first professional game on June 25, 1908.

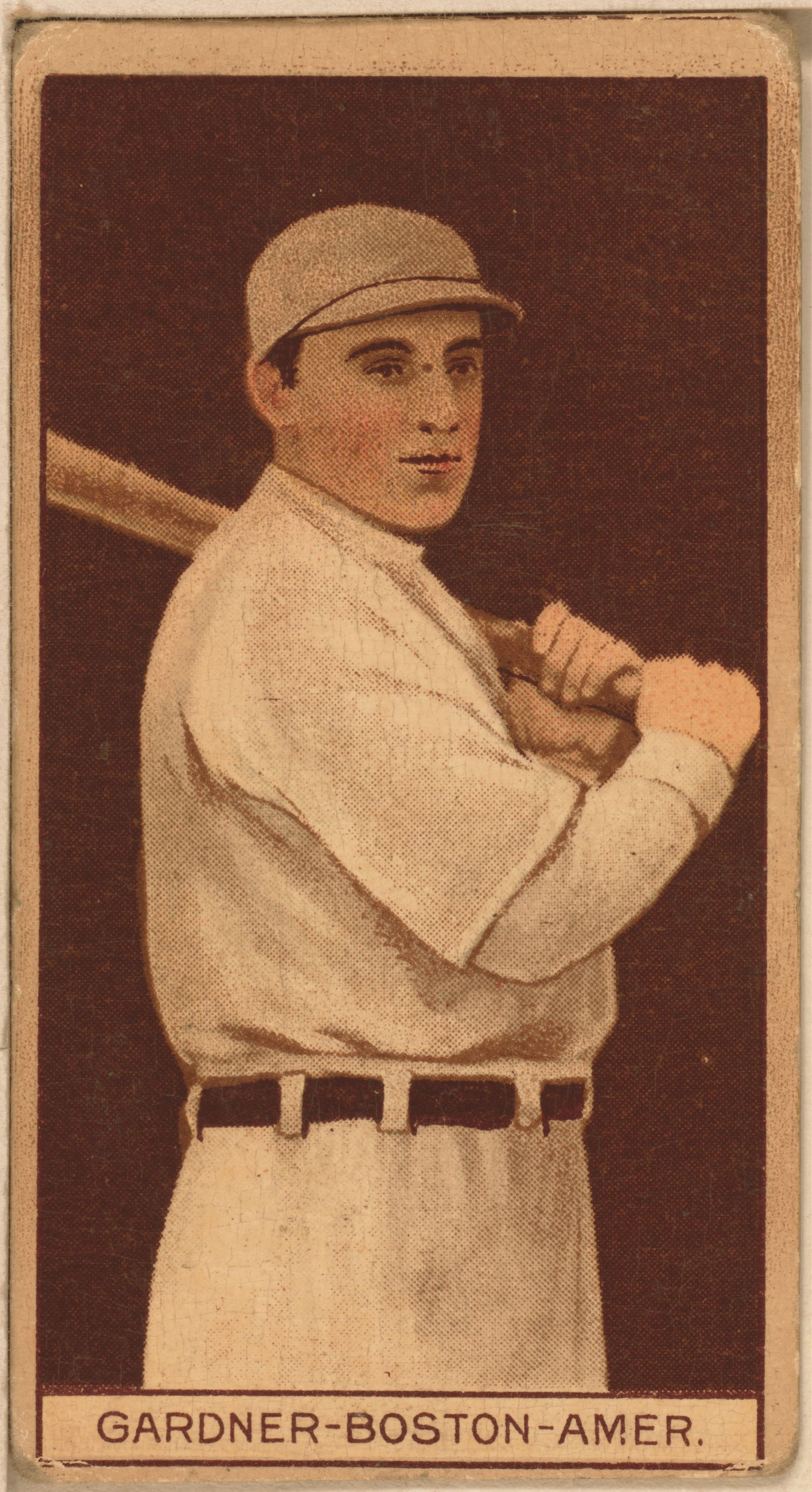

He played most of his prime in the dead-ball era, as the third baseman on several successful Red Sox teams. He helped the Red Sox to victories in the 1912, 1915, and 1916 World Series. He led Boston with 5 RBIs in the 1912 Series and hit his team's only home run. In the 10th inning of the final game, the same inning that included Fred Snodgrass and Chief Meyers making critical fielding mistakes and giving the Red Sox two extra outs to work with, Gardner drove in Steve Yerkes with the series-winning sacrifice fly. He is the only batter to end a World Series with a sacrifice fly. Gardner homered in consecutive games of the 1916 Series, including a three-run inside-the-park homer in Game 4. The two home runs matched his regular season total.

Gardner played a key role on the pennant-winning 1920 Indians, leading the team in RBIs (118) as well as games played (154) and at-bats (597). However, he also was a dismal 3-for-23 in stolen base attempts. He went 5-for-24 in the 1920 World Series, which Cleveland won, 5 games to 2. Gardner was on the winning side in all four of his World Series appearances. Gardner batted only .198 (17-for-86) in 25 World Series games but did score 9 runs, with 3 doubles, 2 triples, 3 home runs, 13 RBI and 4 walks.

His best season was 1921, when he achieved career-highs in batting average (.319), RBIs (120), runs scored (101), and hits (187).

Gardner batted left-handed and threw right-handed. In his 17-season career, Larry Gardner posted a .289 batting average with 27 home runs and 934 RBI in 1923 games.

Gardner was inducted into Vermont's Athletic Hall of Fame in 1969. After his retirement, he returned to the University of Vermont as a baseball coach and athletic director from 1929 to 1951.

== Death and legacy ==
Gardner died on March 11, 1976, in St. George, Vermont after a brief illness.

In its December 27, 1999, issue commemorating the millennium, Sports Illustrated named Gardner as one of the Top 50 Vermont athletes of the 20th century. Gardner was inducted to the Boston Red Sox Hall of Fame in 2000. In 2012 Gardner was inducted into the Vermont Sports Hall of Fame.

The Vermont chapter of the Society for American Baseball Research, located in Burlington, is named in honor of Gardner.

== See also ==
- List of Major League Baseball career triples leaders
- List of Major League Baseball career stolen bases leaders
