= Smoky Joe Wood =

American baseball player (1889–1985)

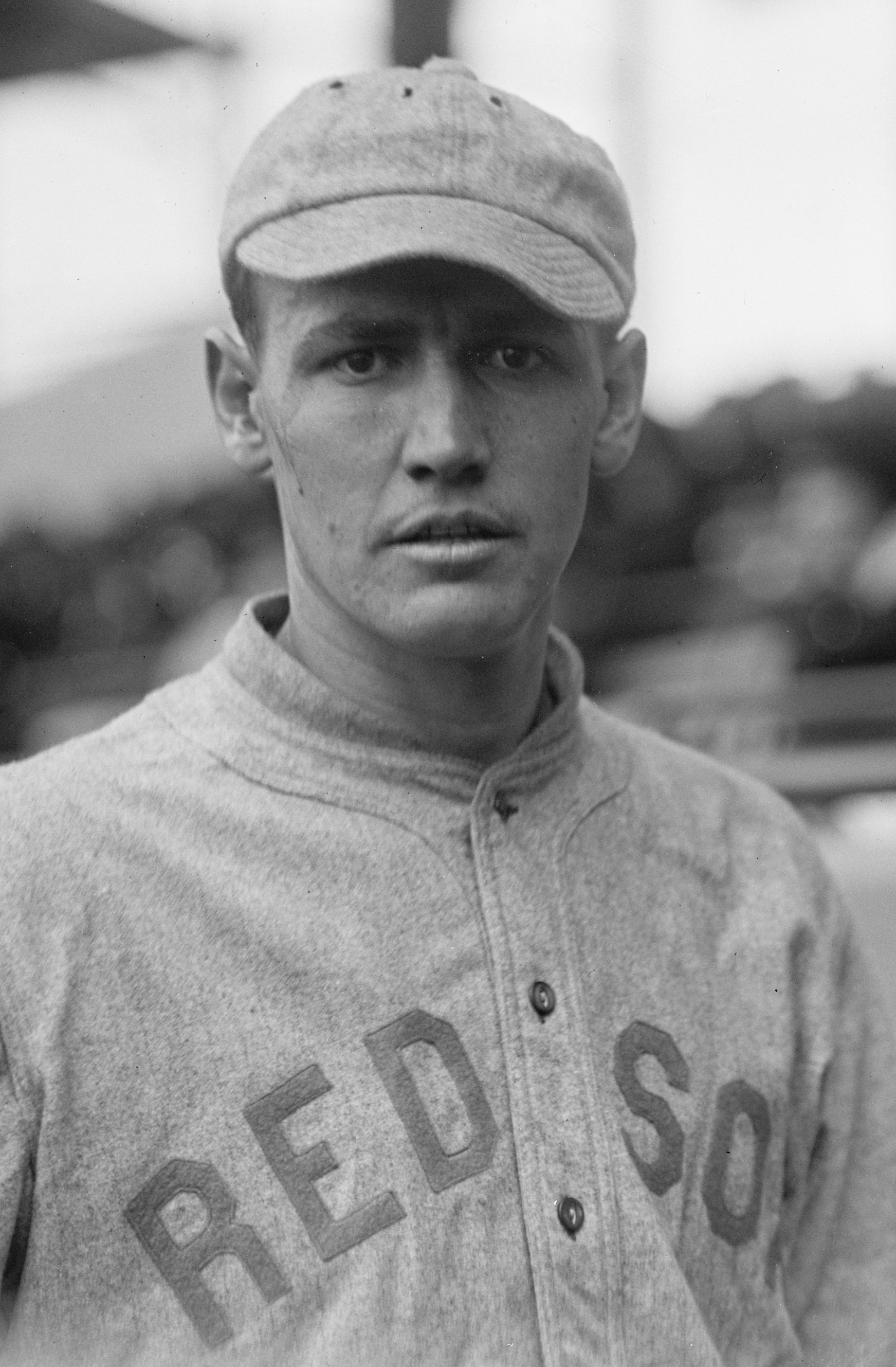
- Wood with the Boston Red Sox in 1915
- Pitcher / Outfielder
- Born: October 25, 1889; Kansas City, Missouri, U.S.
- Died: July 27, 1985 (aged 95); West Haven, Connecticut, U.S.
- Batted: Right Threw: Right

MLB debut
- August 24, 1908, for the Boston Red Sox

Last MLB appearance
- September 24, 1922, for the Cleveland Indians

MLB statistics
- Win–loss record: 117–57
- Earned run average: 2.03
- Strikeouts: 989
- Batting average: .283
- Home runs: 23
- Runs batted in: 325
- Stats at Baseball Reference

Teams
- Boston Red Sox (1908–1915); Cleveland Indians (1917–1922)

Career highlights and awards
- 3× World Series champion (1912, 1915, 1920); MLB wins leader (1912); AL ERA leader (1915); Pitched a no-hitter on July 29, 1911; Boston Red Sox Hall of Fame

Howard Ellsworth "Smoky Joe" Wood (October 25, 1889 – July 27, 1985) was an American professional baseball player for 14 years. He played for the Boston Red Sox from 1908 to 1915, where he was primarily a pitcher, and for the Cleveland Indians from 1917 to 1922, where he was primarily an outfielder. Wood is one of only 13 pitchers to win 30 or more games in one season (going 34–5 in 1912) since 1900.

== Early career ==
Wood played his first amateur baseball for a local minor league team in Ouray, Colorado. He made his debut with the mostly-female "Bloomer Girls." There were many such teams across the country, which barnstormed in exhibition games against teams of men. Bloomer Girl rosters featured at least one male player.

Red Sox star Ted Williams, as a guest on the Bill Stern's The Colgate Sports Newsreel radio program in 1950, told the story Wood was posing as a girl on a girls' team when the Red Sox signed him. The story ended, "The pitcher I'm talking about was the immortal Smoky Joe Wood. A pitcher who can never be forgotten even though he did get his start posing as a girl".

After joining the Red Sox in 1908 at 18, Wood had his breakthrough season in 1911 in which he won 23 games, compiled an earned run average of 2.02, threw a no-hitter against the St. Louis Browns and struck out 15 batters in a single game. Wood once struck out 23 batters in an exhibition game. He earned the nickname "Smoky Joe" because of his blazing fastball. Wood recounted in the seminal 1966 book The Glory of Their Times, "I threw so hard I thought my arm would fly right off my body."

His peers concurred. A story that gained common parlance was that legendary fastballer and pitching contemporary Walter Johnson once said, "Can I throw harder than Joe Wood? Listen, my friend, there's no man alive can throw harder than Smoky Joe Wood!" Reminded of Johnson's supposed assessment 60 years later, Wood said, "Oh, I don't think there was ever anybody faster than Walter." Johnson, whether being as usual self-effacing or literal, did say Wood could throw as hard as he could for two or three innings, but his delivery put much strain on his arm. Johnson had a speed 6.1 miles per hour (9.8 km/h) faster than anyone measured with the photo-electric system (used occasionally in the 1910s through 1930s), but Wood when tested in 1917 had already suffered a career-changing injury.

== 1912 season ==
Wood's best season was in 1912, when he had an ERA of 1.91, 258 strikeouts, a record of 34 wins and only 5 losses. Only 21 times since 1900 have pitchers won 30 or more games, with Wood's 34 victories ranking as the sixth-highest total. He also tied Walter Johnson's record for consecutive victories with 16.

During the 1912 season, Wood had a 13-game winning streak and Johnson had his own American League record 16-game winning streak snapped. On September 6, 1912, Wood faced off against Johnson in a pitching duel at Fenway Park. Originally, Wood was not scheduled to pitch that day, but the Washington Senators challenged the Red Sox to move Wood up in the rotation, so Wood could oppose Johnson. The papers of the time hyped the matchup like a heavyweight prizefight, and a standing-room-only crowd of 29,000 packed the park that day. Johnson and Wood dueled to a scoreless tie through five innings, when with two outs in the sixth, Boston's Tris Speaker doubled to left on a 1–2 count and Duffy Lewis knocked him in with a double down the right-field line. Meanwhile, Wood gave up only two hits and no runs, and the Red Sox prevailed, 1–0.

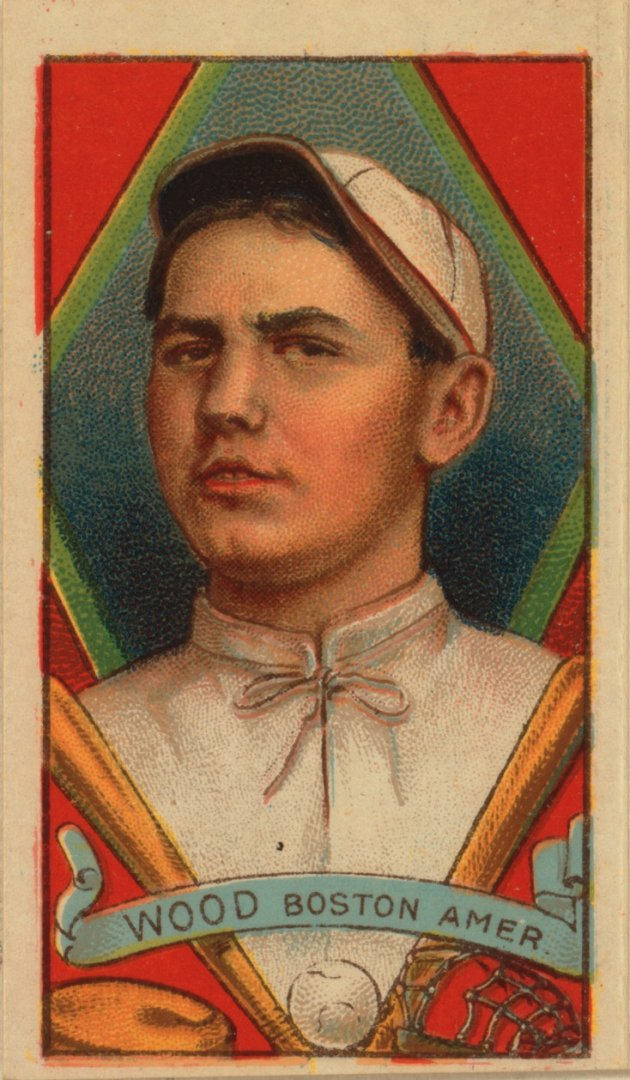
Baseball card

Equally compelling in drama, Wood's Red Sox faced John McGraw's New York Giants in the 1912 World Series. After slugging it out in seven close games, the teams met for the deciding game eight at Fenway with future Hall of Famer Christy Mathewson starting for the Giants. After Boston tied the score 1–1 in the bottom of the seventh, Wood came in to pitch. He matched Mathewson in the eighth and ninth, and the game went into extra innings. In the top of the tenth, Fred Merkle got to Wood knocking in a run with a single. But in the bottom of the tenth, Clyde Engle, pinch-hitting for Wood, hit an easy fly ball to Fred Snodgrass in center field, and Snodgrass dropped the ball. Given new life, the "Snodgrass Muff" cost the Giants as Speaker and Larry Gardner each knocked in a run to overcome the 1-run deficit. Wood and the Red Sox won the game 3–2 and the series 4–3–1. For Wood, the game was his third win in the series against one loss. He also struck out 11 batters in one game, becoming the first pitcher to record double-digit strikeouts in a World Series game.

== Position player ==
The following year, Wood slipped on wet grass while fielding a bunt in a game against the Detroit Tigers. He fell and broke his thumb, and pitched in pain for the following three seasons. Although he maintained a winning record and a low ERA, his appearances were limited, as he could no longer recover quickly from pitching a game. Wood sat out the 1916 season and most of the 1917 season, and for all intents and purposes ended his pitching career.

Late in the 1917 season, Wood was sold to the Cleveland Indians, where he rejoined former teammate Tris Speaker. Always proficient with the bat, Wood embarked on a second career as an outfielder. His former Boston teammate Babe Ruth would make a similar position change a season later in 1919.

Early in the 1918 season, Wood was struggling to establish himself as a regular player. But in a 19-inning game on May 24 against the Yankees at the Polo Grounds, Wood hit two home runs, including the eventual game-winner in the 19th, and in Wood's words, "the worst was finally over."

Establishing himself as a solid player, Wood finished in the top 10 in the American League in runs batted in in two seasons (1918 and 1922), and in 1918 he also finished in the top ten in home runs, doubles, batting average and total bases. Wood pitched seven more times, all but one game in relief, winning none and losing one. He also appeared in four games in the 1920 World Series.

Wood finished his major league career after the 1922 season with a pitching record of 117–57 and an ERA of 2.03. His lifetime batting average was .283. In his final season with the Indians, he had his highest hit total for a season with 150, and also set a personal mark for RBI with 92.

== Later life ==
Wood went on to become head baseball coach at Yale University from 1924 to 1941, where he compiled a record of 283–228–1 over 18 seasons. While at Yale, he coached his son Joe, who pitched briefly for the 1944 Red Sox.

Decades later, in 1981, Wood was present at a historic pitcher's duel between Yale and St. John's University, featuring future major leaguers (and teammates) Ron Darling and Frank Viola. Darling threw 11 no-hit innings for Yale, matched by Viola's 11 shutout innings for St. John's. Wood, sitting in the stands, recalled Ty Cobb and said, "A lot of fellows in my time shortened up on the bat when they had to – that's what the St. John's boys should try against this good pitcher." Darling lost the no-hitter and the game in the 12th, and Wood called it the best baseball game he had ever seen. The account was recorded in Roger Angell's New Yorker (July 20, 1981) article "The Web of the Game", in Angell's 1982 book Late Innings, and, later, in the anthology Game Time: A Baseball Companion.

In 1981, Lawrence Ritter and Donald Honig included him in their book The 100 Greatest Baseball Players of All Time. They explained what they called "the Smoky Joe Wood Syndrome", where a player of truly exceptional talent but a career curtailed by injury should still, in spite of not having had career statistics that would quantitatively rank him with the all-time greats, be included on their list of the 100 greatest players. Wood was also interviewed for Ritter's famous 1966 book The Glory of Their Times.

In 1984, Wood received a standing ovation on Old Timers Day at Fenway Park in Boston, some 72 years after his memorable season. Aged 94, he said he was happy that Boston remembered him as "Smoky".

On January 3, 1985, Yale President A. Bartlett Giamatti presented Joe Wood with the honorary degree of Doctor of Humane Letters. Wood, who was 95 years old, was given this honor in his home close to the Yale ball field. Joe Wood is the first big league player to be given an honorary degree by Yale University. He and Cole Porter are the only two men so honored outside of a traditional Yale commencement.

Wood died in West Haven, Connecticut on July 27, 1985. He was buried in Shohola Township, Pennsylvania. He was the last surviving member of the 1912 World Champion Boston Red Sox. In 1995, he was selected to the Boston Red Sox Hall of Fame. On August 27, 2005, the Society for American Baseball Research's Connecticut Chapter named itself the Connecticut Smoky Joe Wood SABR Chapter.

In 2013, Gerald C. Wood's biography, Smoky Joe Wood: The Biography of a Baseball Legend, was published by the University of Nebraska Press.

== See also ==
- List of Major League Baseball annual wins leaders
- List of Major League Baseball annual ERA leaders
- List of Major League Baseball no-hitters
- List of Major League Baseball career FIP leaders
