= Steve Yerkes =

American baseball player (1888–1971)

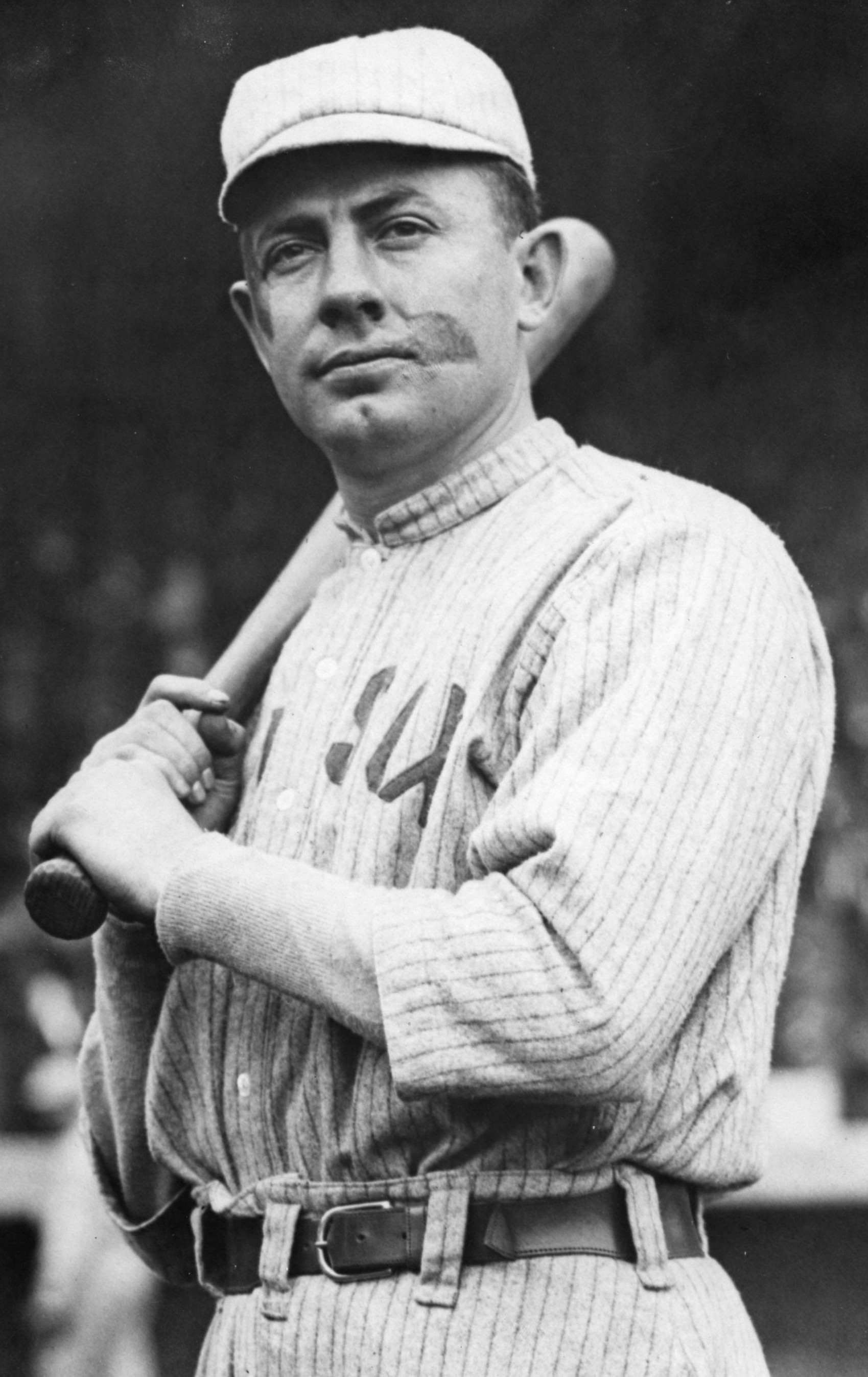
- Second baseman
- Born: May 15, 1888; Hatboro, Pennsylvania, U.S.
- Died: January 31, 1971 (aged 82); Lansdale, Pennsylvania, U.S.
- Batted: Right Threw: Right

MLB debut
- September 16, 1909, for the Boston Red Sox

Last MLB appearance
- October 1, 1916, for the Chicago Cubs

MLB statistics
- Batting average: .268
- Home runs: 6
- Runs batted in: 254
- Stats at Baseball Reference

Teams
- Boston Red Sox (1909, 1911–1914); Pittsburgh Rebels (1914–1915); Chicago Cubs (1916)

Stephen Douglas Yerkes (May 15, 1888 – January 31, 1971) was a professional baseball player.

== Formative years and baseball career ==
Yerkes was born in Hatboro, Pennsylvania on May 15, 1888. He attended Millville High School in Millville, New Jersey. During his early twenties, he played all or part of seven seasons in Major League Baseball. Primarily a second baseman between 1909 and 1916, he played for the Boston Red Sox (1909, 1911–14), of the American League, the Pittsburgh Rebels (1914–15) of the Federal League, and the Chicago Cubs (1916) of the National League.

He played in the first game at Boston's Fenway Park, on April 20, 1912, during which he had five hits, including two doubles. In the 1912 World Series, he drove in the winning run for the Red Sox in Game One, and scored the Series-winning run in the tenth inning of Game Eight.

Yerkes batted and threw right-handed. During his major league career, he posted a .268 batting average with six home runs and 254 RBI in 711 games played.

== Later years ==
After his major league career ended, Yerkes continued to play on and off in minor league baseball until 1923, mostly with the Indianapolis Indians. He then began a career as a manager, working with various minor league teams between 1924 and 1947.

In 1945, Yerkes received one vote from the Baseball Writers' Association of America in the Baseball Hall of Fame voting.

== Death and interment ==
Yerkes died in Lansdale, Pennsylvania, at age 82 and was interred at Holy Sepulchre Cemetery in Cheltenham Township, Pennsylvania.
