= 1912 Detroit Tigers season =

Major League Baseball season

1912 Detroit Tigers
- League: American League
- Ballpark: Navin Field
- City: Detroit, Michigan
- Record: 69–84 (.451)
- League place: 6th
- Owners: William H. Yawkey and Frank Navin
- Managers: Hughie Jennings

The 1912 Detroit Tigers season was a season in American baseball. It involved the Tigers finishing sixth in the American League. It was the team's first season in Tiger Stadium (then known as Navin Field).

== Regular season ==
On April 20, 1912, Navin Field opened the same day as Fenway Park. It was supposed to be opened on April 18 (like Fenway Park) but it rained in both cities on that day. Ty Cobb scored the first run in Tiger Stadium by stealing home.

On May 18, 1912, the Tigers players went on strike to protest the suspension of star center fielder Ty Cobb, who had gone into the stands on May 15 to attack a disabled fan who had been abusing him. Rather than forfeit the next game, the Tigers sent out a team of replacement players, mostly local college and sandlot players but also including Tigers coaches Joe Sugden and 48-year-old Deacon McGuire. Manager Hughie Jennings also entered the game as a pinch hitter. Starting pitcher Allan Travers gave up 24 runs on 26 hits in a complete game loss, both American League records.

On July 4, 1912, George Mullin threw the first no-hitter in Detroit Tigers history. The Tigers beat the St. Louis Browns by a score of 7–0. It was also Mullin's 32nd birthday.

=== Season standings ===
American League
Team	W	L	Pct.	GB	Home	Road
Boston Red Sox	105	47	.691	—	57‍–‍20	48‍–‍27
Washington Senators	91	61	.599	14	45‍–‍32	46‍–‍29
Philadelphia Athletics	90	62	.592	15	45‍–‍31	45‍–‍31
Chicago White Sox	78	76	.506	28	34‍–‍43	44‍–‍33
Cleveland Naps	75	78	.490	30½	41‍–‍35	34‍–‍43
Detroit Tigers	69	84	.451	36½	37‍–‍39	32‍–‍45
St. Louis Browns	53	101	.344	53	27‍–‍50	26‍–‍51
New York Highlanders	50	102	.329	55	31‍–‍44	19‍–‍58

=== Record vs. opponents ===
1912 American League record Sources:
Team	BOS	CWS	CLE	DET	NYH	PHA	SLB	WSH
Boston	—	16–6–1	11–11–1	15–6	19–2	15–7	17–5	12–10
Chicago	6–16–1	—	11–11	14–8–1	13–9	12–10	13–9–2	9–13
Cleveland	11–11–1	11–11	—	13–9	13–8–1	8–14	15–7	4–18
Detroit	6–15	8–14–1	9–13	—	16–6	9–13	13–9	8–14
New York	2–19	9–13	8–13–1	6–16	—	5–17	13–9	7–15
Philadelphia	7–15	10–12	14–8	13–9	17–5	—	16–6	13–7–1
St. Louis	5–17	9–13–2	7–15	9–13	9–13	6–16	—	8–14–1
Washington	10–12	13–9	18–4	14–8	15–7	7–13–1	14–8–1	—

=== Notable transactions ===
- August 26, 1912: Willie Jensen was purchased by the Tigers from the New Haven Murlins.

=== Roster ===
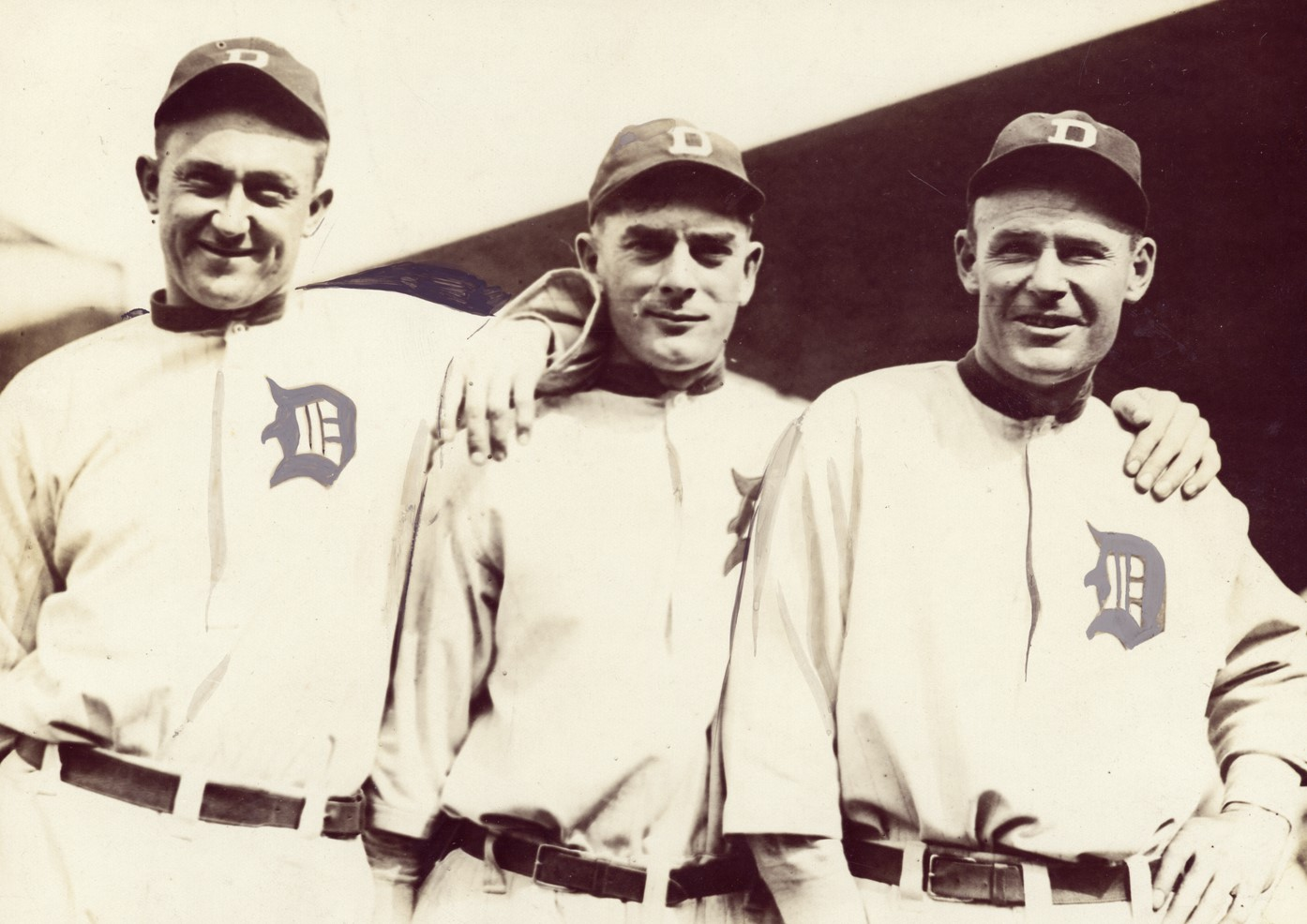
Ty Cobb, Bobby Veach, and Sam Crawford in 1912

1912 Detroit Tigers
Roster
Pitchers: George Boehler; Bill Burns; Tex Covington; Hooks Dauss; Bill Donovan; Jean Dubuc; Willie Jensen; Ed Lafitte; Joe Lake; Pat McGehee; Harry Moran; George Mullin; Hub Pernoll; Alex Remneas; Ed Summers; Allan Travers; Bun Troy; Charlie Wheatley; Ed Willett; Ralph Works	Catchers: Brad Kocher; Deacon McGuire; Jack Onslow; Oscar Stanage; Infielders: Paddy Baumann; Donie Bush; Red Corriden; Charlie Deal; Jim Delahanty; Del Gainer; Ed Irwin; Baldy Louden; Billy Maharg; Vincent Maney; Jim McGarr; George Moriarty; Charley O'Leary; Ollie O'Mara; Eddie Onslow; Jack Smith; Joe Sugden	Outfielders: Al Bashang; Ty Cobb; Sam Crawford; Davy Jones; Bill Leinhauser; Red McDermott; Dan McGarvey; Hank Perry; Bobby Veach; Ossie Vitt; Hap Ward; Other positions: Hughie Jennings	Manager: Hughie Jennings; Coaches: Deacon McGuire

== Player stats ==
=== Batting ===
==== Starters by position ====
Note: Pos = Position; G = Games played; AB = At bats; H = Hits; Avg. = Batting average; HR = Home runs; RBI = Runs batted in

Pos	Player	G	AB	H	Avg.	HR	RBI
C	Oscar Stanage	121	394	103	.261	0	41
1B	George Moriarty	105	375	93	.248	0	54
2B	Baldy Louden	122	403	97	.241	1	36
SS	Donie Bush	144	511	118	.231	2	38
3B	Charlie Deal	42	142	32	.225	0	11
OF	Sam Crawford	149	581	189	.325	4	109
OF	Ty Cobb	140	553	226	.409	7	83
OF	Davy Jones	99	316	93	.294	0	24

==== Other batters ====
Note: G = Games played; AB = At bats; H = Hits; Avg. = Batting average; HR = Home runs; RBI = Runs batted in

Player	G	AB	H	Avg.	HR	RBI
Ossie Vitt	76	273	67	.245	0	19
Jim Delahanty	79	266	76	.286	0	41
Del Gainer	52	179	43	.240	0	20
Red Corriden	38	138	28	.203	0	5
Eddie Onslow	36	128	29	.227	1	13
Bobby Veach	23	79	27	.342	0	15
Jack Onslow	36	69	11	.159	0	4
Brad Kocher	29	63	13	.206	0	9
Paddy Baumann	16	42	11	.262	0	7
Hank Perry	13	36	6	.167	0	0
Red McDermott	5	15	4	.267	0	0
Bill Donovan	6	13	1	.077	0	0
Al Bashang	6	12	1	.083	0	0
Charley O'Leary	3	10	2	.200	0	1
Bill Leinhauser	1	4	0	.000	0	0
Ollie O'Mara	1	4	0	.000	0	0
Jim McGarr	1	4	0	.000	0	0
Joe Sugden	1	4	1	.250	0	0
Dan McGarvey	1	3	0	.000	0	0
Ed Irvin	1	3	2	.667	0	0
Deacon McGuire	1	2	1	.500	0	0
Vincent Maney	1	2	0	.000	0	0
Hap Ward	1	2	0	.000	0	0
Billy Maharg	1	1	0	.000	0	0
Hughie Jennings	1	1	0	.000	0	0
Jack Smith	1	0	0	----	0	0

=== Pitching ===
==== Starting pitchers ====
Note: G = Games pitched; IP = Innings pitched; W = Wins; L = Losses; ERA = Earned run average; SO = Strikeouts

Player	G	IP	W	L	ERA	SO
Ed Willett	37	284.1	17	15	3.29	89
Jean Dubuc	37	250.0	17	10	2.77	97
George Mullin	30	226.0	12	17	3.54	88
Bill Burns	6	38.2	1	4	5.35	6
Charlie Wheatley	5	35.0	1	4	6.17	14
Willie Jensen	5	33.0	1	2	4.09	8
George Boehler	5	32.0	0	2	6.47	15
Hooks Dauss	2	17.0	1	1	3.18	7
Ed Summers	3	16.2	1	1	4.86	5
Allan Travers	1	8.0	0	1	15.75	1
Bun Troy	1	6.2	0	1	5.40	1
Pat McGehee	1	0.0	0	0	----	0

==== Other pitchers ====
Note: G = Games pitched; IP = Innings pitched; W = Wins; L = Losses; ERA = Earned run average; SO = Strikeouts

Player	G	IP	W	L	ERA	SO
Joe Lake	26	162.2	9	11	3.10	86
Ralph Works	27	157.0	5	10	4.24	64
Tex Covington	14	63.1	3	4	4.12	19
Harry Moran	5	14.2	0	1	4.91	3
Bill Donovan	3	10.0	1	0	0.90	6

==== Relief pitchers ====
Note: G = Games pitched; W = Wins; L = Losses; SV = Saves; ERA = Earned run average; SO = Strikeouts

Player	G	W	L	SV	ERA	SO
Hub Pernoll	3	0	0	0	6.00	3
Ed Lafitte	1	0	0	0	16.20	0
Alex Remneas	1	0	0	0	27.00	0
