= 1912 St. Louis Browns season =

Major League Baseball season

1912 St. Louis Browns
- League: American League
- Ballpark: Sportsman's Park
- City: St. Louis, Missouri
- Record: 53–101 (.344)
- League place: 7th
- Owners: Robert Hedges
- Managers: Bobby Wallace and George Stovall

The 1912 St. Louis Browns season involved the Browns finishing 7th in the American League with a record of 53 wins and 101 losses.

== Regular season ==
- July 4, 1912: George Mullin threw the first no-hitter in Detroit Tigers history against the Browns. The Tigers beat the Browns by a score of 7–0. It was also Mullin's 32nd birthday.

=== Season standings ===
American League
Team	W	L	Pct.	GB	Home	Road
Boston Red Sox	105	47	.691	—	57‍–‍20	48‍–‍27
Washington Senators	91	61	.599	14	45‍–‍32	46‍–‍29
Philadelphia Athletics	90	62	.592	15	45‍–‍31	45‍–‍31
Chicago White Sox	78	76	.506	28	34‍–‍43	44‍–‍33
Cleveland Naps	75	78	.490	30½	41‍–‍35	34‍–‍43
Detroit Tigers	69	84	.451	36½	37‍–‍39	32‍–‍45
St. Louis Browns	53	101	.344	53	27‍–‍50	26‍–‍51
New York Highlanders	50	102	.329	55	31‍–‍44	19‍–‍58

=== Record vs. opponents ===
1912 American League record Sources:
Team	BOS	CWS	CLE	DET	NYH	PHA	SLB	WSH
Boston	—	16–6–1	11–11–1	15–6	19–2	15–7	17–5	12–10
Chicago	6–16–1	—	11–11	14–8–1	13–9	12–10	13–9–2	9–13
Cleveland	11–11–1	11–11	—	13–9	13–8–1	8–14	15–7	4–18
Detroit	6–15	8–14–1	9–13	—	16–6	9–13	13–9	8–14
New York	2–19	9–13	8–13–1	6–16	—	5–17	13–9	7–15
Philadelphia	7–15	10–12	14–8	13–9	17–5	—	16–6	13–7–1
St. Louis	5–17	9–13–2	7–15	9–13	9–13	6–16	—	8–14–1
Washington	10–12	13–9	18–4	14–8	15–7	7–13–1	14–8–1	—

=== Roster ===
1912 St. Louis Browns
Roster
Pitchers: Willie Adams; Mack Allison; Bill Bailey; George Baumgardner; Curly Brown; Elmer Brown; John Frill; Earl Hamilton; Joe Lake; Roy Mitchell; Buddy Napier; Red Nelson; Barney Pelty; Jack Powell; Hack Spencer; Carl Weilman	Catchers: Walt Alexander; Lou Criger; Frank Crossin; Phil Ketter; Paul Krichell; Charlie Snell; Jim Stephens; Fred Walden; Infielders: Jimmy Austin; John Daley; Ed Hallinan; Joe Kutina; Frank LaPorte; Charlie Miller; Ed Miller; Del Pratt; Doc Shanley; Henry Smoyer; George Stovall; Bobby Wallace	Outfielders: George Aiton; Bunny Brief; Bill Brown; Pete Compton; Willie Hogan; Heinie Jantzen; Burt Shotton; Gus Williams; Other batters: Tom Tennant	Manager: George Stovall; Bobby Wallace

== Player stats ==
=== Batting ===
==== Starters by position ====
Note: Pos = Position; G = Games played; AB = At bats; H = Hits; Avg. = Batting average; HR = Home runs; RBI = Runs batted in

Pos	Player	G	AB	H	Avg.	HR	RBI
C	Jim Stephens	75	205	51	.249	0	22
1B	George Stovall	116	398	101	.254	0	45
2B	Del Pratt	152	570	172	.302	5	69
SS	Bobby Wallace	100	323	78	.241	0	31
3B	Jimmy Austin	149	536	135	.252	2	44
OF	Burt Shotton	154	580	168	.290	2	40
OF	Willie Hogan	108	360	77	.214	1	36
OF	Pete Compton	103	268	75	.280	2	30

==== Other batters ====
Note: G = Games played; AB = At bats; H = Hits; Avg. = Batting average; HR = Home runs; RBI = Runs batted in

Player	G	AB	H	Avg.	HR	RBI
Frank LaPorte	80	266	83	.312	1	38
Gus Williams	64	216	63	.292	2	32
Joe Kutina	69	205	42	.205	1	18
Paul Krichell	59	161	35	.217	0	8
Heinie Jantzen	31	119	22	.185	1	8
Walt Alexander	37	97	17	.175	0	5
Ed Hallinan	28	86	19	.221	0	1
John Daley	18	52	9	.173	1	3
Ed Miller	13	46	9	.196	0	5
Bunny Brief	15	42	13	.310	0	5
Frank Crossin	8	22	5	.227	0	2
Bill Brown	9	20	4	.200	0	1
Charlie Snell	8	19	4	.211	0	0
George Aiton	10	17	4	.235	0	1
Henry Smoyer	6	14	3	.214	0	0
Doc Shanley	5	8	0	.000	0	1
Phil Ketter	2	6	2	.333	0	0
Lou Criger	1	2	0	.000	0	0
Tom Tennant	2	2	0	.000	0	0
Charlie Miller	1	2	0	.000	0	0
Fred Walden	1	0	0	----	0	0

=== Pitching ===
==== Starting pitchers ====
Note: G = Games pitched; IP = Innings pitched; W = Wins; L = Losses; ERA = Earned run average; SO = Strikeouts

Player	G	IP	W	L	ERA	SO
Earl Hamilton	41	249.2	11	14	3.24	139
Jack Powell	32	235.1	9	17	3.10	67
George Baumgardner	30	218.1	11	13	3.38	102
Carl Weilman	8	48.1	2	4	2.79	24
Barney Pelty	6	38.1	1	5	5.59	10
John Frill	3	4.1	0	1	20.77	2

==== Other pitchers ====
Note: G = Games pitched; IP = Innings pitched; W = Wins; L = Losses; ERA = Earned run average; SO = Strikeouts

Player	G	IP	W	L	ERA	SO
Mack Allison	31	169.0	6	17	3.62	43
Elmer Brown	23	120.1	5	8	2.99	45
Curly Brown	16	64.2	1	3	4.87	28
Roy Mitchell	13	62.0	3	4	4.65	22
Joe Lake	11	57.0	1	7	4.42	28
Willie Adams	13	46.1	2	3	3.88	16
Buddy Napier	7	25.1	1	2	4.97	10
Red Nelson	8	18.0	0	2	7.00	9
Bill Bailey	3	10.2	0	1	9.28	2

==== Relief pitchers ====
Note: G = Games pitched; W = Wins; L = Losses; SV = Saves; ERA = Earned run average; SO = Strikeouts

Player	G	W	L	SV	ERA	SO
Hack Spencer	1	0	0	0	0.00	0
