= 1912 Philadelphia Athletics season =

1912 Philadelphia Athletics
- League: American League
- Ballpark: Shibe Park
- City: Philadelphia
- Record: 90–62 (.592)
- League place: 3rd
- Owners: Benjamin Shibe, Tom Shibe, John Shibe, Connie Mack, Sam Jones, Frank Hough
- Managers: Connie Mack

The 1912 Philadelphia Athletics season involved the A's finishing third in the American League with a record of 90 wins and 62 losses.

== Regular season ==
=== Season standings ===
American League
Team	W	L	Pct.	GB	Home	Road
Boston Red Sox	105	47	.691	—	57‍–‍20	48‍–‍27
Washington Senators	91	61	.599	14	45‍–‍32	46‍–‍29
Philadelphia Athletics	90	62	.592	15	45‍–‍31	45‍–‍31
Chicago White Sox	78	76	.506	28	34‍–‍43	44‍–‍33
Cleveland Naps	75	78	.490	30½	41‍–‍35	34‍–‍43
Detroit Tigers	69	84	.451	36½	37‍–‍39	32‍–‍45
St. Louis Browns	53	101	.344	53	27‍–‍50	26‍–‍51
New York Highlanders	50	102	.329	55	31‍–‍44	19‍–‍58

=== Record vs. opponents ===
1912 American League record Sources:
Team	BOS	CWS	CLE	DET	NYH	PHA	SLB	WSH
Boston	—	16–6–1	11–11–1	15–6	19–2	15–7	17–5	12–10
Chicago	6–16–1	—	11–11	14–8–1	13–9	12–10	13–9–2	9–13
Cleveland	11–11–1	11–11	—	13–9	13–8–1	8–14	15–7	4–18
Detroit	6–15	8–14–1	9–13	—	16–6	9–13	13–9	8–14
New York	2–19	9–13	8–13–1	6–16	—	5–17	13–9	7–15
Philadelphia	7–15	10–12	14–8	13–9	17–5	—	16–6	13–7–1
St. Louis	5–17	9–13–2	7–15	9–13	9–13	6–16	—	8–14–1
Washington	10–12	13–9	18–4	14–8	15–7	7–13–1	14–8–1	—

=== Notable transactions ===
- August 20, 1912: Roy Crabb was purchased by the Athletics from the Chicago White Sox.
- September 16, 1912: Billy Orr was drafted by the Athletics from the Sacramento Sacts in the 1912 rule 5 draft.

=== Roster ===
1912 Philadelphia Athletics
Roster
Pitchers: Hardin Barry; Chief Bender; Boardwalk Brown; Joe Bush; Jack Coombs; Stan Coveleski; Roy Crabb; Dave Danforth; Slim Harrell; Byron Houck; Harry Krause; Doc Martin; Cy Morgan; Herb Pennock; Eddie Plank; Lefty Russell; Roger Salmon	Catchers: Ben Egan; Jack Lapp; Ira Thomas; Infielders: Frank Baker; Jack Barry; Eddie Collins; Claud Derrick; Howard Fahey; Joe Mathes; Stuffy McInnis	Outfielders: Bris Lord; Harl Maggert; Danny Murphy; Eddie Murphy; Rube Oldring; Amos Strunk; Jimmy Walsh; Other batters: Chester Emerson	Manager: Connie Mack

== Player stats ==
=== Batting ===
==== Starters by position ====
Note: Pos = Position; G = Games played; AB = At bats; H = Hits; Avg. = Batting average; HR = Home runs; RBI = Runs batted in

Pos	Player	G	AB	H	Avg.	HR	RBI
C	Jack Lapp	91	281	82	.292	1	35
1B	Stuffy McInnis	153	568	186	.327	3	101
2B	Eddie Collins	153	543	189	.348	0	64
SS	Jack Barry	140	483	126	.261	0	55
3B	Frank Baker	149	577	200	.347	10	130
OF	Bris Lord	97	378	90	.238	0	25
OF	Rube Oldring	99	395	119	.301	1	24
OF	Amos Strunk	122	412	119	.289	3	63

==== Other batters ====
Note: G = Games played; AB = At bats; H = Hits; Avg. = Batting average; HR = Home runs; RBI = Runs batted in

Player	G	AB	H	Avg.	HR	RBI
Harl Maggert	74	242	62	.256	1	13
Eddie Murphy	33	142	45	.317	0	6
Ira Thomas	48	139	30	.216	1	13
Ben Egan	49	138	24	.174	0	13
Danny Murphy	36	130	42	.323	2	20
Jimmy Walsh	31	107	27	.252	0	15
Claud Derrick	21	58	14	.241	0	7
Joe Mathes	4	14	2	.143	0	0
Howard Fahey	6	8	0	.000	0	0
Chester Emerson	1	1	0	.000	0	0

=== Pitching ===
==== Starting pitchers ====
Note: G = Games pitched; IP = Innings pitched; W = Wins; L = Losses; ERA = Earned run average; SO = Strikeouts

Player	G	IP	W	L	ERA	SO
Jack Coombs	40	262.1	21	10	3.29	120
Eddie Plank	37	259.2	26	6	2.22	110
Boardwalk Brown	34	199.0	13	11	3.66	64
Byron Houck	30	180.2	8	8	2.94	75
Chief Bender	27	171.0	13	8	2.74	90
Cy Morgan	16	93.2	3	8	3.75	47
Roy Crabb	7	43.1	2	4	3.74	12
Joe Bush	1	8.0	0	0	7.88	3

==== Other pitchers ====
Note: G = Games pitched; IP = Innings pitched; W = Wins; L = Losses; ERA = Earned run average; SO = Strikeouts

Player	G	IP	W	L	ERA	SO
Stan Coveleski	5	21.0	2	1	3.43	9
Lefty Russell	5	17.1	0	2	7.27	9
Harry Krause	4	5.1	0	2	13.50	3
Roger Salmon	2	5.0	1	0	9.00	5

==== Relief pitchers ====
Note: G = Games pitched; W = Wins; L = Losses; SV = Saves; ERA = Earned run average; SO = Strikeouts

Player	G	W	L	SV	ERA	SO
Herb Pennock	17	1	2	2	4.50	38
Hardin Barry	3	0	0	0	7.62	3
Dave Danforth	3	0	0	0	3.98	8
Doc Martin	2	0	0	0	10.38	4
Slim Harrell	1	0	0	0	0.00	1
