= 1912 Chicago White Sox season =

1912 Chicago White Sox
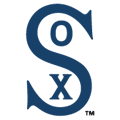
- Chicago White Sox logo introduced in 1912
- League: American League
- Ballpark: Comiskey Park
- City: Chicago
- Record: 78–76 (.506)
- League place: 4th
- Owners: Charles Comiskey
- Managers: Nixey Callahan

In 1912, the Chicago White Sox debuted a widely known logo in baseball – a large "S" in a Roman-style font, with a small "O" inside the top loop of the "S" and a small "X" inside the bottom loop.

== History of SOX Logo ==
This logo was first used in 1912.

This is the logo associated with the 1917 World Series championship team, and the 1919 Black Sox.

With a couple of brief interruptions, the dark blue logo with the large "S" lasted through 1938 (but continued in a modified block style into the 1940s).

== Team Colors ==
Through the 1940s, the White Sox team colors were primarily navy blue trimmed with red.

== Offseason ==
- October 1911: Del Paddock was purchased by the White Sox from the Dubuque Hustlers.

== Regular season ==
=== Season standings ===
American League
Team	W	L	Pct.	GB	Home	Road
Boston Red Sox	105	47	.691	—	57‍–‍20	48‍–‍27
Washington Senators	91	61	.599	14	45‍–‍32	46‍–‍29
Philadelphia Athletics	90	62	.592	15	45‍–‍31	45‍–‍31
Chicago White Sox	78	76	.506	28	34‍–‍43	44‍–‍33
Cleveland Naps	75	78	.490	30½	41‍–‍35	34‍–‍43
Detroit Tigers	69	84	.451	36½	37‍–‍39	32‍–‍45
St. Louis Browns	53	101	.344	53	27‍–‍50	26‍–‍51
New York Highlanders	50	102	.329	55	31‍–‍44	19‍–‍58

=== Record vs. opponents ===
1912 American League record Sources:
Team	BOS	CWS	CLE	DET	NYH	PHA	SLB	WSH
Boston	—	16–6–1	11–11–1	15–6	19–2	15–7	17–5	12–10
Chicago	6–16–1	—	11–11	14–8–1	13–9	12–10	13–9–2	9–13
Cleveland	11–11–1	11–11	—	13–9	13–8–1	8–14	15–7	4–18
Detroit	6–15	8–14–1	9–13	—	16–6	9–13	13–9	8–14
New York	2–19	9–13	8–13–1	6–16	—	5–17	13–9	7–15
Philadelphia	7–15	10–12	14–8	13–9	17–5	—	16–6	13–7–1
St. Louis	5–17	9–13–2	7–15	9–13	9–13	6–16	—	8–14–1
Washington	10–12	13–9	18–4	14–8	15–7	7–13–1	14–8–1	—

=== Notable transactions ===
- April 26, 1912: Del Paddock was returned by the White Sox to the Dubuque Hustlers.
- August 20, 1912: Roy Crabb was purchased from the White Sox by the Philadelphia Athletics.

=== Roster ===
1912 Chicago White Sox
Roster
Pitchers: Ralph Bell; Joe Benz; Eddie Cicotte; Roy Crabb; Flame Delhi; Phil Douglas; Ellis Johnson; Rip Jordan; Fred Lamlein; Frank Lange; George Mogridge; Rube Peters; Jim Scott; Harry Smith; Wiley Taylor; Ed Walsh; Doc White	Catchers: Bruno Block; Ted Easterly; Walt Kuhn; Wally Mayer; Ray Schalk; Billy Sullivan; Infielders: Lena Blackburne; Babe Borton; Mutz Ens; Jack Fournier; Kid Gleason; Ernie Johnson; Harry Lord; Morrie Rath; Lee Tannehill; Buck Weaver; Rollie Zeider	Outfielders: Cuke Barrows; Dennis Berran; Ping Bodie; Nixey Callahan; Shano Collins; Wally Mattick; Matty McIntyre; Other positions: Polly McLarry; Del Paddock; Polly Wolfe	Manager: Nixey Callahan; Coaches: Kid Gleason

== Player stats ==
=== Batting ===
==== Starters by position ====
Note: Pos = Position; G = Games played; AB = At bats; H = Hits; Avg. = Batting average; HR = Home runs; RBI = Runs batted in

Pos	Player	G	AB	H	Avg.	HR	RBI
C	Walt Kuhn	76	178	36	.202	0	10
1B	Rollie Zeider	130	420	103	.245	1	42
2B	Morrie Rath	157	591	161	.272	1	19
SS	Buck Weaver	147	523	117	.224	1	43
3B	Harry Lord	151	570	152	.267	5	54
OF	Ping Bodie	138	472	139	.294	5	72
OF	Shano Collins	153	579	168	.290	2	81
OF	Nixey Callahan	111	408	111	.272	1	52

==== Other batters ====
Note: G = Games played; AB = At bats; H = Hits; Avg. = Batting average; HR = Home runs; RBI = Runs batted in

Player	G	AB	H	Avg.	HR	RBI
Wally Mattick	90	285	74	.260	1	35
Bruno Block	46	136	35	.257	0	26
Babe Borton	31	105	39	.371	0	17
Billy Sullivan	41	91	19	.209	0	15
Matty McIntyre	49	84	14	.167	0	10
Jack Fournier	35	73	14	.192	0	2
Ray Schalk	23	63	18	.286	0	8
Ted Easterly	30	55	20	.364	0	14
Ernie Johnson	21	42	11	.262	0	5
Cuke Barrows	8	13	3	.231	0	2
Wally Mayer	9	9	0	.000	0	0
Mutz Ens	3	6	0	.000	0	0
Dennis Berran	2	4	1	.250	0	0
Lee Tannehill	4	3	0	.000	0	0
Kid Gleason	1	2	1	.500	0	0
Polly McLarry	2	2	0	.000	0	0
Lena Blackburne	5	1	0	.000	0	0
Polly Wolfe	1	1	0	.000	0	0
Del Paddock	1	1	0	.000	0	0

=== Pitching ===
==== Starting pitchers ====
Note: G = Games pitched; IP = Innings pitched; W = Wins; L = Losses; ERA = Earned run average; SO = Strikeouts

Player	G	IP	W	L	ERA	SO
Ed Walsh	62	393.0	27	17	2.15	254
Joe Benz	42	238.2	13	17	2.90	97
Eddie Cicotte	20	152.0	9	7	2.84	70
Wiley Taylor	3	20.0	0	1	4.95	4
Harry Smith	1	5.0	1	0	1.80	1

==== Other pitchers ====
Note: G = Games pitched; IP = Innings pitched; W = Wins; L = Losses; ERA = Earned run average; SO = Strikeouts

Player	G	IP	W	L	ERA	SO
Doc White	32	172.0	8	10	3.24	57
Frank Lange	31	165.1	10	10	3.27	96
Rube Peters	28	108.2	5	6	4.14	39
George Mogridge	17	64.2	3	4	4.04	31
Jim Scott	6	37.2	2	2	2.15	23
Phil Douglas	3	12.1	0	1	7.30	7
Roy Crabb	2	8.2	0	1	1.04	3

==== Relief pitchers ====
Note: G = Games pitched; W = Wins; L = Losses; SV = Saves; ERA = Earned run average; SO = Strikeouts

Player	G	W	L	SV	ERA	SO
Rip Jordan	3	0	0	0	5.11	1
Ellis Johnson	3	0	0	0	3.86	7
Ralph Bell	3	0	0	0	9.00	5
Flame Delhi	1	0	0	0	9.00	2
Fred Lamlein	1	0	0	0	31.50	1
