= 1915 Cincinnati Reds season =

1915 Cincinnati Reds
- League: National League
- Ballpark: Redland Field
- City: Cincinnati, Ohio
- Owners: Garry Herrmann
- Managers: Buck Herzog

The 1915 Cincinnati Reds season was a season in American baseball. The team finished seventh in the National League with a record of 71–83, 20 games behind the Philadelphia Phillies.

== Off-season ==
On December 14, the Reds picked up infielder Ivy Olson off of waivers from the Cleveland Naps. Olson struggled in the 1914 season, batting .242 with one home run and 20 RBI in 89 games with the Naps.

In early 1915, the Reds lost infielder Marty Berghammer, who jumped to the Pittsburgh Rebels of the Federal League. Berghammer saw limited action with the club, batting .223 with six RBI in 77 games during the 1914 season.

The club purchased pitcher Gene Dale from the Montreal Royals of the International League. Dale had a 10-17 record with a 4.94 ERA with the Royals in the 1914 season, pitching 253.1 innings pitched in 36 games. Dale had previous major league experience, going 0-7 with a 6.60 ERA in 24 games over two seasons in 1911 and 1912 with the St. Louis Cardinals.

On February 11, Cincinnati traded third baseman Bert Niehoff to the Philadelphia Phillies in exchange for catcher Red Dooin. Dooin struggled for the Phillies in 1914, batting only .178 with one home run and eight RBI in 53 games. To replace Niehoff at third base, the Reds moved second baseman Heinie Groh to third, and newly acquired Ivy Olson and Joe Wagner, who the team acquired in late December from the Spokane Indians of the Northwestern League, would split time playing second base.

The Reds signed free agent outfielder Tommy Leach to a contract on February 22. Leach, who began his major league career with the Louisville Colonels in 1898, appeared in 153 games with the Chicago Cubs in 1914, batting .263 with seven home runs and 46 RBI. Leach had led the National League with 22 triples and six home runs while playing for the Pittsburgh Pirates in 1902, led the NL with 126 runs with the Pirates in 1909, and led the NL again in runs in 1913 with the Cubs with 99.

On the same date, February 22, Cincinnati selected pitcher Fred Toney off of waivers from the Brooklyn Robins. He played the 1914 season with the Louisville Colonels of the American Association, going 21-15 with a 3.21 ERA, pitching 311 innings in 49 games. Toney pitched with the Chicago Cubs from 1911 to 1913, going 4-5 with a 4.02 ERA in 34 games in those three seasons.

== Regular season ==
On April 8, before the regular season began, the Reds traded away catcher Mike Gonzalez to the St. Louis Cardinals for catcher Ivey Wingo. Wingo batted .300 with four home runs and 26 RBI in 80 games with the Cardinals the previous season.

Midway through the season, on July 8, the Reds purchased second baseman Bill Rodgers from the Boston Red Sox. Rodgers had already split the season between the Cleveland Indians and the Red Sox, batting .275 with seven RBI in 27 games, before being acquired by Cincinnati. He became the starting second baseman, as nine days later, the Reds placed Ivy Olson on waivers, and he was picked up by the Brooklyn Robins.

On July 23, the club sold pitcher Red Ames to the St. Louis Cardinals. Ames, who led the Reds pitching staff in 1914 with 297 innings pitched and 47 games pitched, while having a record of 15-21, struggled badly with the team at the time he was sold. In 17 games, Ames was 2-4 with a 4.50 ERA in 68 innings. He made only seven starts.

The club continued to make moves with the pitching staff, as Rube Benton was sold to the New York Giants for $3000 on August 19. Benton had a 6-13 record with a 3.32 ERA in 35 games.

Offensively, the team was second in the National League with a .253 batting average, and led the league in hits. Tommy Griffith led the Reds with a .307 batting average, four home runs and 85 RBI in his first season with the team. Heinie Groh had a solid season in his first year as a third baseman, batting .290 with three home runs and 50 RBI in 160 games. Player-manager Buck Herzog hit .264 with one home run, 42 RBI and a team high 35 stolen bases in 154 games.

The pitching staff was led by Gene Dale, who led the Reds with a record of 18-17, a 2.46 ERA and pitched in a team high 49 games, making 35 starts, throwing 20 complete games, and pitched 296.2 innings. Fred Toney had a record of 17-6 with a team best 1.58 ERA in 36 games, while 19 year old Pete Schneider had a 14-19 record with a 2.48 ERA in 48 games.

=== Season summary ===
The rebuilding Reds had a very solid 8-3 record in their first eleven games, however, a 3-13 stretch in their next 16 games knocked them into last place in the National League. The club would stay below .500 for the rest of the season, batting the New York Giants, Pittsburgh Pirates, St. Louis Cardinals and Chicago Cubs for fourth in the National League. Eventually, the Reds finished in seventh place with a record of 71-83, 20 games behind the Philadelphia Phillies for the National League Pennant. Their 71 wins was an improvement of 11 over the 1914 season, and attendance more than doubled in 1915, as Cincinnati drew 218,878 fans, however, it was still the lowest in the league.

=== Season standings ===
National League
Team	W	L	Pct.	GB	Home	Road
Philadelphia Phillies	90	62	.592	—	49‍–‍27	41‍–‍35
Boston Braves	83	69	.546	7	49‍–‍27	34‍–‍42
Brooklyn Robins	80	72	.526	10	51‍–‍26	29‍–‍46
Chicago Cubs	73	80	.477	17½	42‍–‍34	31‍–‍46
Pittsburgh Pirates	73	81	.474	18	40‍–‍37	33‍–‍44
St. Louis Cardinals	72	81	.471	18½	42‍–‍36	30‍–‍45
Cincinnati Reds	71	83	.461	20	39‍–‍37	32‍–‍46
New York Giants	69	83	.454	21	37‍–‍38	32‍–‍45

=== Record vs. opponents ===
1915 National League record Sources:
Team	BSN	BRO	CHI	CIN	NYG	PHI	PIT	STL
Boston	—	14–8–1	10–12–1	15–7	13–9–1	7–14	15–7	9–12–2
Brooklyn	8–14–1	—	14–8	11–11–1	12–8	13–9	11–11	11–11
Chicago	12–10–1	8–14	—	13–9–2	8–14	7–14	13–9	12–10
Cincinnati	7–15	11–11–1	9–13–2	—	9–13–1	9–13	12–10–1	14–8–1
New York	9–13–1	8–12	14–8	13–9–1	—	7–15–1	8–14	10–12
Philadelphia	14–7	9–13	14–7	13–9	15–7–1	—	10–12	15–7
Pittsburgh	7–15	11–11	9–13	10–12–1	14–8	12–10	—	10–12–1
St. Louis	12–9–2	11–11	10–12	8–14–1	12–10	7–15	12–10–1	—

=== Roster ===
1915 Cincinnati Reds
Roster
Pitchers: Red Ames; Rube Benton; Curly Brown; Ray Callahan; Goat Cochran; Gene Dale; Phil Douglas; Lefty George; King Lear; Harry McCluskey; Limb McKenry; Pete Schneider; Fred Toney	Catchers: Tommy Clarke; Red Dooin; Ivey Wingo; Infielders: Heinie Groh; Buck Herzog; Fritz Mollwitz; Ivy Olson; Bill Rodgers; Fritz Von Kolnitz; Joe Wagner	Outfielders: Johnny Beall; Tommy Griffith; Red Killefer; Tommy Leach; George Twombly; Ken Williams	Manager: Buck Herzog

== Player stats ==
=== Batting ===
==== Starters by position ====
Note: Pos = Position; G = Games played; AB = At bats; H = Hits; Avg. = Batting average; HR = Home runs; RBI = Runs batted in

Pos	Player	G	AB	H	Avg.	HR	RBI
C	Ivey Wingo	119	339	75	.221	3	29
1B	Fritz Mollwitz	153	525	136	.259	1	51
2B	Bill Rodgers	72	213	51	.239	0	12
SS	Buck Herzog	155	579	153	.264	1	42
3B	Heinie Groh	160	587	170	.290	3	50
OF	Tommy Leach	107	335	75	.224	0	17
OF	Red Killefer	155	555	151	.272	1	41
OF	Tommy Griffith	160	583	179	.307	4	85

==== Other batters ====
Note: G = Games played; AB = At bats; H = Hits; Avg. = Batting average; HR = Home runs; RBI = Runs batted in

Player	G	AB	H	Avg.	HR	RBI
Tommy Clarke	96	226	65	.288	0	21
Ken Williams	71	219	53	.242	0	16
Ivy Olson	63	207	48	.232	0	14
Joe Wagner	75	197	35	.178	0	13
Fritz Von Kolnitz	50	78	15	.192	0	6
George Twombly	46	66	13	.197	0	5
Johnny Beall	10	34	8	.235	0	3
Red Dooin	10	31	10	.323	0	0

=== Pitching ===
==== Starting pitchers ====
Note: G = Games pitched; IP = Innings pitched; W = Wins; L = Losses; ERA = Earned run average; SO = Strikeouts

Player	G	IP	W	L	ERA	SO
Gene Dale	49	296.2	18	17	2.46	104
Pete Schneider	48	275.2	14	19	2.48	108
Fred Toney	36	222.2	17	6	1.58	108
Phil Douglas	8	46.2	1	5	5.40	29

==== Other pitchers ====
Note: G = Games pitched; IP = Innings pitched; W = Wins; L = Losses; ERA = Earned run average; SO = Strikeouts

Player	G	IP	W	L	ERA	SO
Rube Benton	35	176.1	6	13	3.32	83
King Lear	40	167.2	6	10	3.01	46
Limb McKenry	21	110.1	5	5	2.94	37
Red Ames	17	68.0	2	4	4.50	26
Lefty George	5	28.0	2	2	3.86	11
Curly Brown	7	27.0	0	2	4.67	13

==== Relief pitchers ====
Note: G = Games pitched; W = Wins; L = Losses; SV = Saves; ERA = Earned run average; SO = Strikeouts

Player	G	W	L	SV	ERA	SO
Ray Callahan	3	0	0	0	8.53	4
Harry McCluskey	3	0	0	0	5.40	2
Goat Cochran	1	0	0	0	9.00	1
