= Crossin =

Crossin is a surname. Notable people with the surname include:

- Carl Crossin (born 1953), Australian choral conductor, educator, and composer
- Chink Crossin (1923–1981), American basketball player
- Frank Crossin (1891–1965), American baseball player
- Trish Crossin (1956–2026), Australian politician
