= Maggert =

Maggert is a surname. Notable people with the surname include:

- Harl Maggert (disambiguation), multiple people
- Jeff Maggert (born 1964), American golfer
