= Harl Maggert =

Harl Maggert may refer to:

- Harl Maggert (1910s outfielder) (1883–1963), Major League Baseball outfielder for the Pittsburgh Pirates and Philadelphia Athletics
- Harl Maggert (1930s outfielder) (1914–1986), Major League Baseball outfielder for the Boston Bees
