= Bill Rumler =

American baseball player (1891–1966)

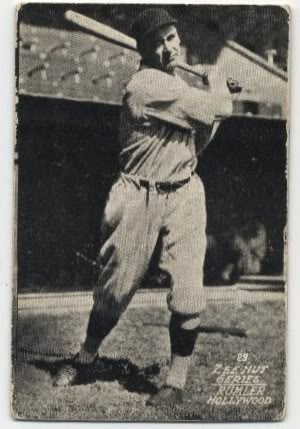
- Catcher / Outfielder
- Born: March 27, 1891; Milford, Nebraska, U.S.
- Died: May 26, 1966 (aged 75); Lincoln, Nebraska, U.S.
- Batted: Right Threw: Right

MLB debut
- May 4, 1914, for the St. Louis Browns

Last MLB appearance
- September 27, 1917, for the St. Louis Browns

MLB statistics
- Batting average: .251
- Home runs: 1
- Runs batted in: 32
- Stats at Baseball Reference

Teams
- St. Louis Browns (1914, 1916–1917)

William George Rumler (March 27, 1891 – May 26, 1966), known as James Rumler during the 1918 season, and Red Moore during the 1921 season, was an American professional baseball player, whose career spanned 19 seasons, three of which were spent in Major League Baseball (MLB) with the St. Louis Browns (1914, 1916–17). He played catcher, and outfielder. Over his major league career, Rumler compiled a combined batting average of .251 with 15 runs scored, 43 hits, seven doubles, four triples, one home run, and 32 runs batted in (RBIs) in 139 games played. After making his MLB debut in 1914, he spent the next season in the minor leagues. He returned to the majors in 1916, and again for a final time in 1917.

After his MLB career was over, Rumler joined the minor league Salt Lake City Bees of the Pacific Coast League (PCL). In 1920, during his second season with the team, Rumler was given a five-year suspension from the PCL after being accused of throwing games for gamblers. He played with several outlaw leagues after he was suspended. He returned to the PCL in 1929 as a member of the Hollywood Stars. In 1932, he was hired as a player-manager for the Lincoln Links. He has a combined career minor league batting average of .342 with 1,037 hits in 826 games played. Rumler batted and threw right-handed. During his career, he stood at 6 feet 1 inch (185 cm), and weighed 190 pounds (86 kg).

== Early life ==
Rumler was born on March 27, 1891, in Milford, Nebraska, to Charles, and Sophia Rumler of Germany, and Russia, respectively. Bill Rumler had two brothers and a sister. Their father worked as a farmer. At the age of 17, Bill Rumler was working on his father's farm.

== Professional career ==
=== Early career, and St. Louis Browns (1913–17) ===
In 1913, Rumler began his professional baseball debut after signing with the minor league Great Bend Millers of the Class-D Kansas State League. With Great Bend, he batted .314 with 76 hits in 61 games played. Late in the season, Rumler was sold to the Burlington Pathfinders of the Class-D Central Association. For the Pathfinders, Rumler batted .350 with 49 hits in 37 games played. After the season, he was drafted by the Major League Baseball (MLB) St. Louis Browns in the 1913 rule 5 draft. He joined the Browns for spring training in 1914. Rumler made his MLB debut on May 4, 1914, against the Chicago White Sox. On June 22, in a game against the Philadelphia Athletics, Rumler collided with the fence at Sportsman's Park, and was knocked unconscious. In his first season in the majors, Rumler batted .174 with two runs scored, eight hits, one double, six runs batted in (RBIs), and two stolen bases in 34 games played. Defensively, he played 10 games at catcher, and six games in the outfield.

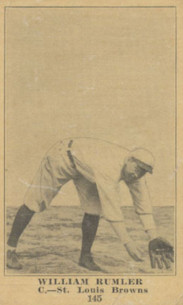
Rumler spent three seasons in the major leagues, all with the St. Louis Browns.

On June 30, 1914, the St. Louis Browns sold Rumler to the Montgomery Rebels of the Class-A Southern Association. However, he never made an appearance with the Rebels. In December 1914, Rumler was signed by the Atlanta Crackers of the Class-A Southern Association. At the start of the 1915 season, Crackers manager William Smith stated that he was going to use Rumler primarily as an outfielder. On the season, he batted .253 with 93 hits, 12 doubles, nine triples, and six home runs in 122 games played. His home run total tied him for fourth in the Southern Association with Tim Hendryx, and Red McDermott. Rumler started the 1916 season with the Little Rock Travelers of the Class-A Southern Association. He batted .337 with 84 hits, 10 doubles, five triples, and eight home runs in 75 games played. Rumler led the league in slugging percentage (.514); and was second in home runs, and batting average.

In late-July 1916, Rumler was sold by the minor league Little Rock Travelers to the St. Louis Browns. On the season with the Browns, he batted .324 with six runs scored, 12 hits, three doubles, and 10 RBIs in 27 games played. That season, Rumler set a career high in MLB batting average. He played all of his nine defensive games at the catcher position. After the season, Rumler participated in a charity game with semi-professional baseball players in Lincoln, Nebraska.

In 1917, Rumler re-joined the St. Louis Browns. It was his first, and only full MLB season. On April 20, Rumler drove in the winnings runs in the top of the ninth inning during a game against the Cleveland Indians. Through July 3, Rumler had the third-highest batting average in the American League, behind Earl Hamilton, and Babe Ruth. In July, Rumler stated that he was considering joining the United States military so he could fight in World War I. He hit his first, and only MLB home run on September 21, against New York Yankees pitcher George Mogridge. His final game came on September 27. With St. Louis that year, he batted .261 with seven runs scored, 23 hits, three doubles, four triples, one home run, 16 RBIs, and two stolen bases in 78 games played. During the season, Rumler registered 71 pinch-hit at-bats, which was an MLB record at the time.

=== World War I, return, and suspension (1918–1920) ===
In 1918, Rumler was sold by the St. Louis Browns to the minor league Columbus Senators of the Double-A American Association. That year, he was known as "James" Rumler. He played just seven games with Columbus, who was managed by Joe Tinker. In those games, he batted .125 with two hits in 16 at-bats. On May 23, Rumler was drafted into the United States military to fight in World War I. He attained the rank of sergeant with the Army's 5th Company, 163rd Depot Brigade, in Iowa at Camp Dodge, mostly playing baseball. A broken leg sustained during a game had not healed by the end of the war, and when Rumler was discharged in December he had yet to see action oversees.

After World War I, Rumler signed with the minor league Salt Lake City Bees of the Double-A Pacific Coast League (PCL). During spring training that season, the Oakland Tribune wrote that Rumler was "one of the hardest hitters in the Bees camp", and that "if he keeps up the clip throughout the season he will be right up among the leading batters [in the PCL]". He won a starting job with the Salt Lake club out of spring training. On the season, he batted .362 with 214 hits, 42 doubles, 17 triples, and 17 home runs in 140 games played. He led the league in batting average, doubles; was second in home runs; and third in triples. In January 1920, the St. Louis Browns, Rumler's former team, attempted to make a deal with the Salt Lake City Bees for him. However, the Browns did not offer the players that Salt Lake wanted, and the deal fell apart. Rumler injured his leg during spring training in 1920. On April 7, Rumler hit the first home run in the PCL by any batter in the 1920 season. On July 24, in a game against the Seattle Rainiers, he hit two home runs in the same game.

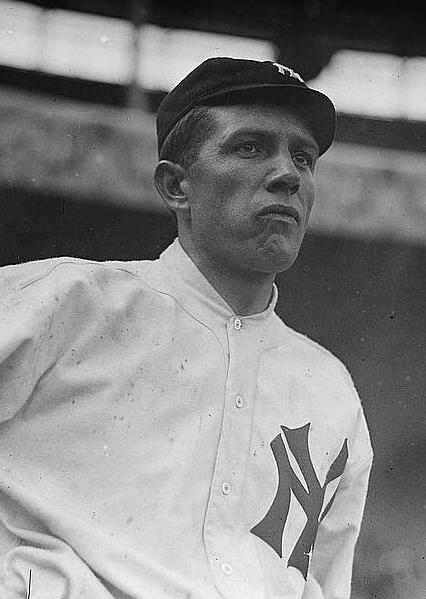
Babe Borton claimed that Rumler accepted money in exchange for throwing baseball games. However, Rumler denied any wrongdoing.

In August 1920, Babe Borton, a first baseman for the Vernon Tigers, came forward and claimed the Vernon club paid players from the Salt Lake City Bees to throw the 1919 PCL pennant series. According to Borton, Vernon manager Bill Essick had asked him if he could get any Salt Lake players to throw the pennant game. Borton stated that he got four players from the Salt Lake club, Rumler being one of them, to agree to throw games so that Vernon could win the PCL pennant. Broton claimed that he paid Rumler US$200. Rumler admitted to taking Borton's money, but claimed it was not a bribe, but a friendly bet on which team would win the series. On August 13, executives from the Salt Lake club cleared Rumler of any wrongdoing. On August 17, Rumler was suspended indefinably by PCL executives. It was later announced that the suspension meant Rumler would be prohibited from playing in organized baseball for five years. Rumler batted .348 with 185 hits, 37 doubles, 12 triples, and 23 home runs in 128 games played before his suspension.

In September 1920, it was announced that PCL team presidents would meet and decide if Rumler should be re-instated. The president of the Pacific Coast League at the time, William H. McCarthy, stated that if Rumler, who he believed was guilty of throwing the pennant games, was allowed to continue to play in the PCL, he would resign his post as league president. Rumler threatened to take legal action against the PCL. Every team president voted against the reinstatement of Rumler, upholding league president McCarthy's five-year ban.

Rumler was brought before a Los Angeles County grand jury in November 1920 on criminal conspiracy charges. The grand jury handed down an indictment on Rumler. He was eventually cleared on all charges. In January 1921, the National Association of Minor Leagues adopted a resolution banning Rumler, Maggert, Borton, and Gene Dale from organized minor league baseball, backing up the PCL's decision.

=== Outlaw leagues, and return to organized baseball (1921–1932) ===
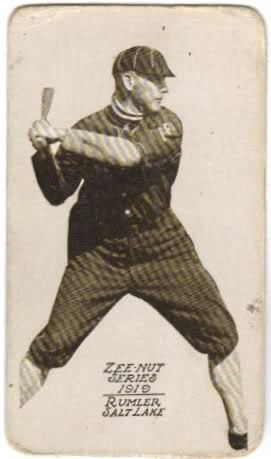
After his suspension in 1920, Rumler was forced to play in outlaw leagues until 1929, when his ban was lifted.

In 1921, Rumler went under the name Red Moore, and played with the Minot Minoters, who represented Minot, North Dakota. Minot was an outlaw baseball team. On July 15, Rumler was appointed manager of the Minot club. The Bismarck Tribune called Rumler Minot's "big home run hitter and catcher". At the end of the season, it was rumored that Rumler was going to be able to return to the PCL Salt Lake City Bees. However, in 1922, Rumler joined the outlaw Hibbing, Minnesota Minnesota Steel League team. He joined the Canton Terminals, who represented Canton, Ohio, in 1923. He re-signed with the Canton club in 1924.

In 1925, Rumler signed with the Kenosha Twin Sixies, who represented Kenosha, Wisconsin. He primarily played center field for the Twins Sixies that year. On the season, he hit eight home runs. In January 1926, Rumler announced that he wanted to re-sign with the Kenosha club. He eventually made it official when he re-signed with the Twin Sixies, and returned to his spot in center field. In 1927, Rumler again played for the Twin Sixies. In April 1928, Rumler was hired to manage to the Milford, Nebraska, team.

On December 4, 1928, Rumler's suspension from organized baseball was lifted, and he signed with the Hollywood Stars of the PCL. He attended spring training with the Stars that season. He made the club at the start of the regular season. In late-May, he suffered an injury to his shoulder, which healed by mid-June. During the fourth game of the 1929 PCL pennant series against the Mission Reds, Rumler was struck in the head by a pitch, and knocked unconscious. He regained consciousness that night in the hospital. Rumler was released from the hospital in time for the deciding fifth game, which the Stars won due to an eight inning come-back led by Rumler. On the season, he batted .386 with 194 hits, 39 doubles, three triples, and 26 home runs in 140 games played. He was third in the PCL in batting average.

Rumler re-signed with the Hollywood Stars in 1930. In April, while on a train going to Oakland, California, Rumler had a nightmare, which caused him to kick his foot through the Pullman's window. After the incident, he had to sit out for a week while the lacerations on his foot and leg. On June 18, during a game against the Mission Reds, Rumler hit a game-winning home run. He suffered another injury in September. With the Stars that year, Rumler batted .353 with 122 hits, 23 doubles, three triples, and 14 home runs.

On May 6, 1931, Rumler signed with the Denver Bears of the Class-A Western League. With the Bears, he batted .237 with 14 hits, one double, and one triple in 16 games played. In August, he signed with the Canadian-American Clowns, a travel team. As a member of the Clowns, he played a game against the House of David, a Negro league baseball team who represented Ogden, Utah. His last season in professional baseball would come in 1932, as the player-manager for the Lincoln Links of the Class-D Nebraska State League. With Lincoln, he batted .340 with 16 hits, five doubles, and one triple in 17 games played. He was succeeded as manager of the club by Bob Sanguinet.

== Later life ==
In 1930, Rumler lived with his parents on their farm in Milford, Nebraska. His last residence was in Milford. Rumler died on May 26, 1966, in Lincoln, Nebraska. He was buried at Blue Mound Cemetery in Milford.
