= Ben Van Dyke =

American baseball player (1888–1973)

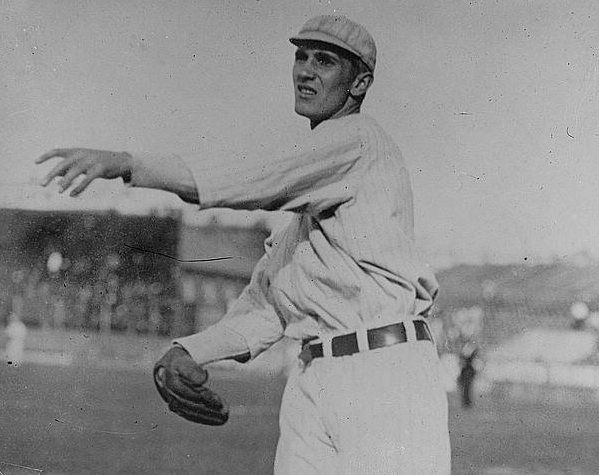
- Pitcher
- Born: August 15, 1888; Clintonville, Pennsylvania, U.S.
- Died: October 22, 1973 (aged 85); Sarasota, Florida, U.S.
- Batted: Right Threw: Left

MLB debut
- May 11, 1909, for the Philadelphia Phillies

Last MLB appearance
- September 26, 1912, for the Boston Red Sox

MLB statistics
- Earned run average: 3.32
- Strikeouts: 13
- Innings pitched: 21 2/3
- Stats at Baseball Reference

Teams
- Philadelphia Phillies (1909); Boston Red Sox (1912)

Benjamin Harrison Van Dyke (August 15, 1888 – October 22, 1973) was an American pitcher in Major League Baseball who played for the Philadelphia Phillies (1909) and Boston Red Sox (1912). Listed at 6 ft 1 in (1.85 m), 150 lb., Van Dyke batted right-handed and threw left-handed.

== Biography ==
Van Dyke was born in Clintonville, Pennsylvania on August 15, 1888.

During a two-season career, Van Dyke posted a 3.32 ERA in five games, including one start, three games finished, 13 strikeout, 11 walks, 20 hits allowed and 21 2/3 innings of work, without a decision or saves.

Van Dyke was a member of the 1912 American League champion Red Sox, although he did not play in the World Series.

== Death ==
Van Dyke died at the age of eighty-five in Sarasota, Florida.

== See also ==
- 1912 Boston Red Sox season
