= Charley Hall (pitcher) =

American baseball player (1884–1943)

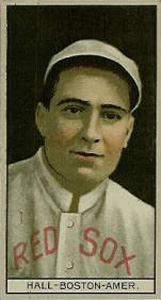
- Hall pitching for the Boston Red Sox in 1912
- Pitcher
- Born: July 27, 1884; Ventura, California, U.S.
- Died: December 6, 1943 (aged 59); Ventura, California, U.S.
- Batted: Left Threw: Right

MLB debut
- July 12, 1906, for the Cincinnati Reds

Last MLB appearance
- August 7, 1918, for the Detroit Tigers

MLB statistics
- Win–loss record: 54–47
- Earned run average: 3.09
- Strikeouts: 427
- Stats at Baseball Reference

Teams
- Cincinnati Reds (1906–1907); Boston Red Sox (1909–1913); St. Louis Cardinals (1916); Detroit Tigers (1918)

Career highlights and awards
- World Series champion (1912)

Charles Louis Hall (July 27, 1884 – December 6, 1943) was an American professional baseball pitcher. He played in Major League Baseball (MLB) for the Cincinnati Reds, Boston Red Sox, St. Louis Cardinals, and Detroit Tigers. He pitched in 118 games totalling 909 2/3 innings. He had 427 strikeouts, a 3.09 earned run average (ERA), and 3 shutouts. He started 81 games.

As a hitter, Hall was a better than average hitting pitcher, posting a .197 batting average (73-for-371) with 32 runs, 2 home runs, 40 RBIs and 17 bases on balls. In the 1912 World Series, in two pitching appearances, he hit .750 (3-for-4) with 1 double and 1 walk.

== Early life ==
Hall was born on July 27, 1884, in Ventura, California, to Arthur and Elvira (Mungari) Hall; he was christened Carlos Luis Hall. His mother was a descendant of the Californios who founded the Presidio of Santa Barbara in the eighteenth century and both Spanish and English were spoken in the home. One of his Red Sox teammates, Eddie Cicotte, later jokingly insisted that Hall's real name was "Carlos Cholo," which some reference works have repeated as fact.

== Early years in baseball ==
Hall broke into the minor leagues with the Seattle Siwashes of the "near-major" Pacific Coast League in 1904. Beginning in relief, he soon became a starter, achieving a 29–19 record his first year over a phenomenal 425 innings. He worked even more innings the following year, notching a no-hitter and producing a 23–27 record.

Hall also pitched and coached third base in the semi-pro leagues in Southern California during the off-season. His voice often grew hoarse from shouting commands to baserunners, which led fans to imitate his bark when he came to bat and, later, inspired Red Sox fans to give him the nickname "Sea Lion."

Hall pitched another no-hitter in 1906 before joining the Cincinnati Reds, where he pitched as both a starter and reliever for parts of two years before going down to the minor-league Columbus Senators. Hall went from Columbus to the St. Paul Saints for part of the 1909 season, then on to the Red Sox in June of that year.

== Major League career ==
Hall pitched both in relief and as a starter for the Red Sox from 1909 through 1913, winning the first game played in the new Fenway Park in 1912, before being released at the end of the 1913 season. After two years back in the minors with the Saints, where he won 15 games in a row, he returned to the majors with the Cardinals in 1916, where his struggles with control led the team to sell him to the Los Angeles Angels of the PCL mid-season.

Hall pitched for a year and a half with the Angels, then returned to the Saints in 1918. The Detroit Tigers picked him up after the Saints' season ended early due to World War I, then released him at the end of the year.

== Later years in baseball ==
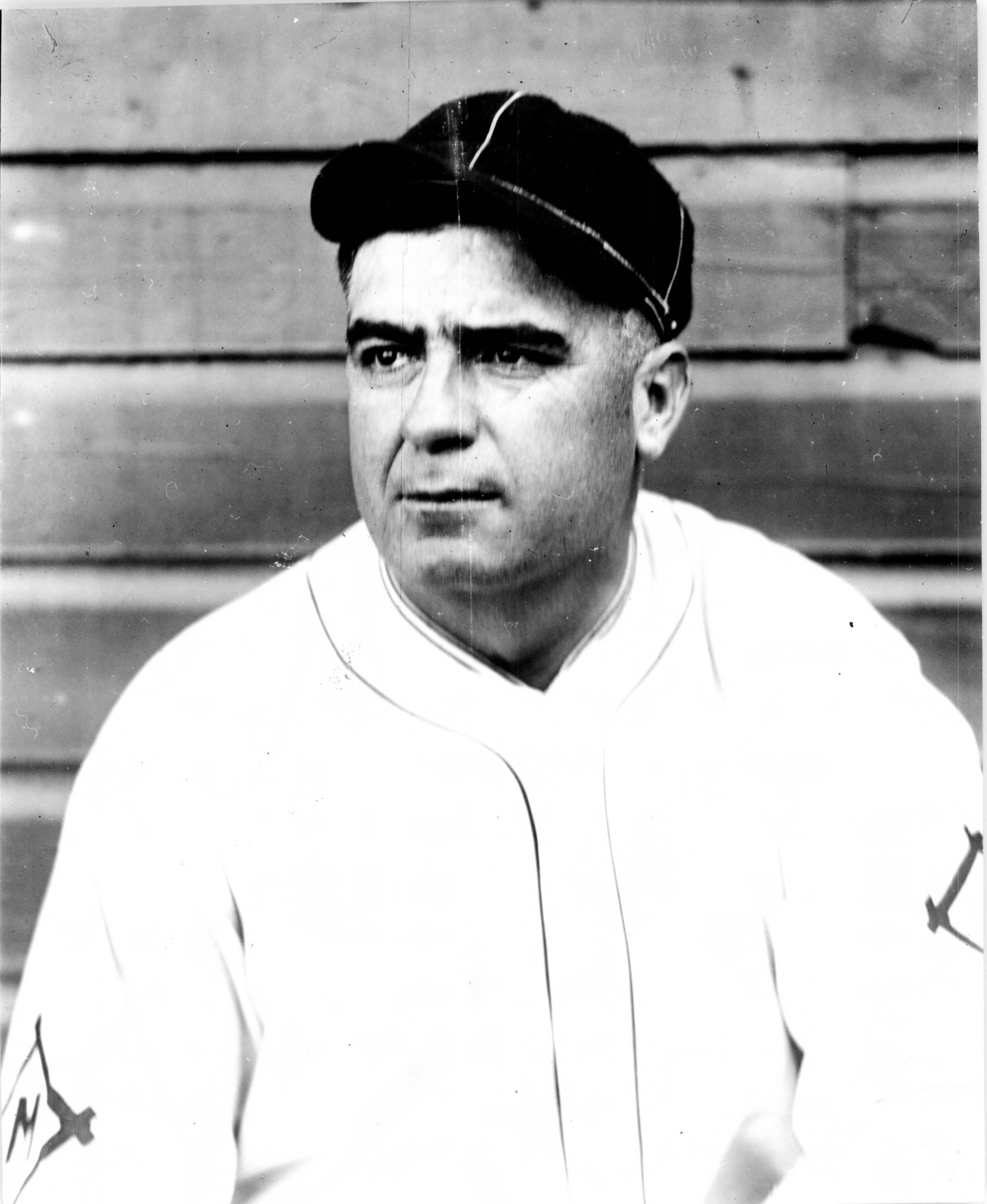
Hall in 1925

In 1919 Hall went back to the Saints, who were about to embark on some of the best seasons ever played by any minor league team. His performance during the 1920 season, in which he accumulated a 27–8 record with a 2.06 ERA, helped lead the Saints to first place in the American Association. He moved on to the Sacramento Solons of the PCL in 1924, then, after a brief stint with the Birmingham Barons, ended his baseball career in 1925 at age 41 with the Minneapolis Millers. He had amassed 277 wins and 224 losses and a 3.17 ERA in 668 games in the minors.

== Personal life ==
Hall married his first wife Emma in 1906; they had a son, Marshall. After Emma died in childbirth in 1909, Marshall was raised by her parents. Hall then married Marie Cullen in 1911; they had two sons, Charley and Kenneth. His son Charley, as a six year old, accidentally shot and killed his three-year-old brother in 1920.

Hall worked as a policeman, jailer, and deputy sheriff after he retired from baseball. He died from Parkinson's disease in 1943. Fred Lieb's obituary of Hall in The Sporting News marked his passing: "Many a player who played with Charley or batted against him must have felt a passing regret that the big Sea Lion had roared his last."
