= 1912 Boston Red Sox season =

Major League Baseball season

1912 Boston Red Sox
- World Series champions American League champions
- League: American League
- Ballpark: Fenway Park
- City: Boston, Massachusetts
- Record: 105–47 (.691)
- League place: 1st
- Owners: John I. Taylor; Jimmy McAleer
- Manager: Jake Stahl
- Stats: ESPN.com; Baseball Reference

The 1912 Boston Red Sox season was the 12th season in the franchise's Major League Baseball history. This was the first year that the team played its home games at Fenway Park. The Red Sox finished first in the American League (AL) with a record of 105 wins and 47 losses. The team set the franchise record for highest winning percentage (.691) in a season, which still stands; tied the franchise record for fewest losses in a season, originally set by the 1903 team; and set a franchise record for most wins, which was not surpassed until the 2018 club.

The team then faced the National League (NL) champion New York Giants in the 1912 World Series, which the Red Sox won in eight games to capture the franchise's second World Series. One of the deciding plays in the World Series was a muffed fly ball by Giants outfielder Fred Snodgrass, which became known as the "$30,000 muff" in reference to the prize money for the winning team.

Behind center fielder Tris Speaker and pitcher Smoky Joe Wood, the Red Sox led the league in runs scored and fewest runs allowed. Speaker was third in batting and was voted league Most Valuable Player. Wood won 34 games, including a record 16 in a row. Although the pitching staff was satisfactory, the only star pitcher was Wood, while the only star in the starting lineup was Speaker. Little-known third baseman Larry Gardner was the next best hitter, while future Hall of Famer Harry Hooper had a poor offensive season.

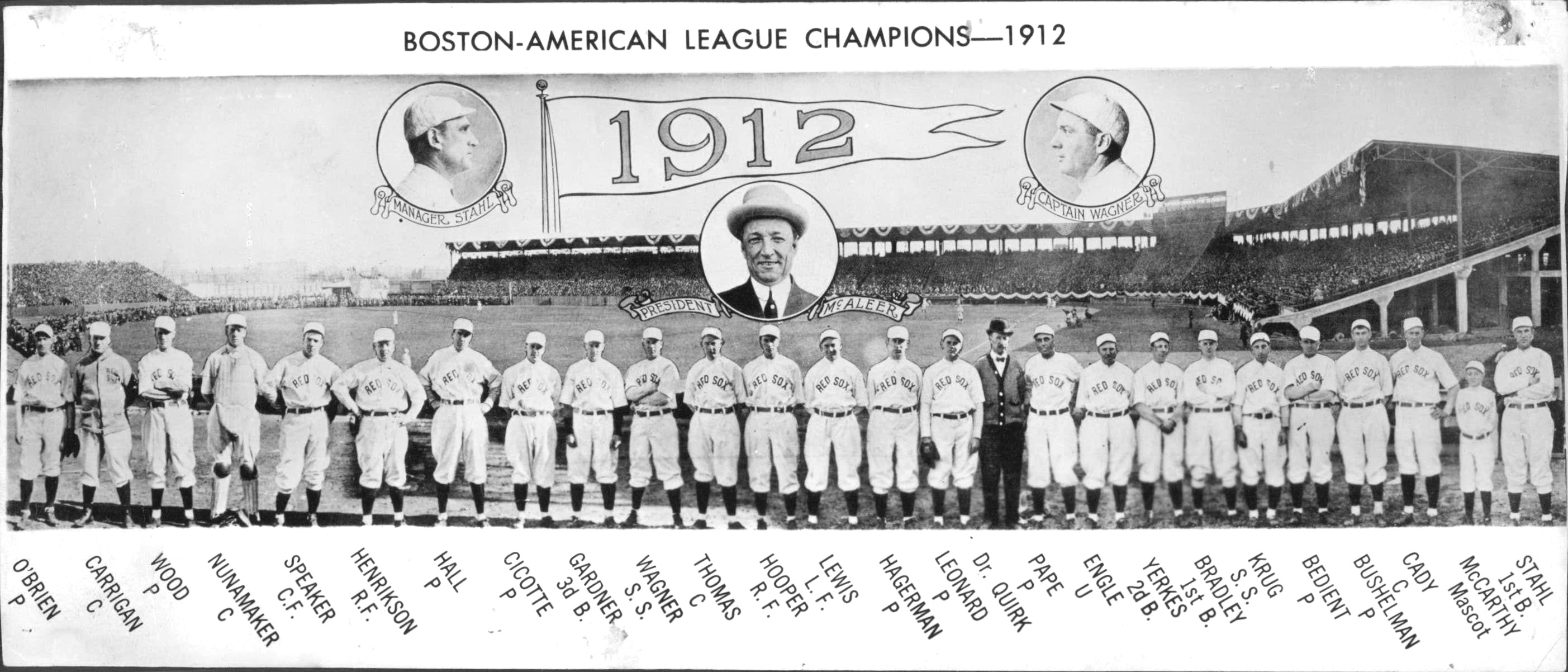
1912 Boston Red Sox team photo

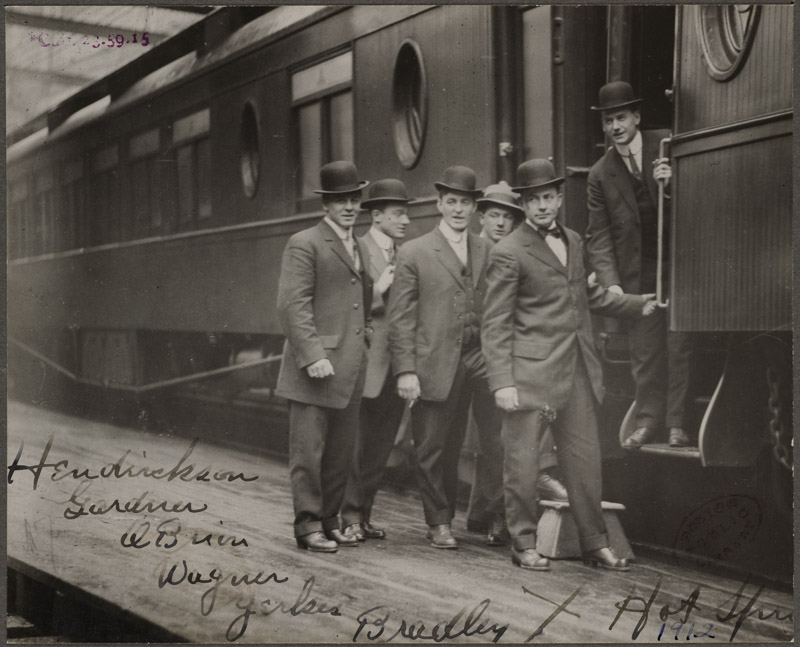
Red Sox players in Hot Springs, Arkansas, for spring training in 1912

== Offseason ==
The Red Sox made several transactions during the 1912 offseason. The Red Sox sold two players to the Chicago White Sox during the offseason: Jack Fournier on February 6 and Eddie Cicotte on July 9. Later in the year, on November 25, Hugh Bradley was sold to the Jersey City Giants minor league baseball team of the International League.

=== Transactions ===
November 6, 1911: The St. Paul Saints announce the purchase of outfielder Joe Riggert from the Red Sox.

January 6, 1912: The Red Sox trade players Harold Janvrin, Martin McHale, Walter Lonergan, Hap Myers, Jack Thoney, and Billy Purtell to the Jersey City Skeeters in exchange for catcher Forrest Cady.

February, 1912: The Red Sox sell infielder Rip Williams to the New York Highlanders. On February 23, the Highlanders sent Williams to the Washington Nationals.

February 6, 1912: The Chicago White Sox announce the purchase of infielder Jack Fournier from the Red Sox.

== Regular season ==
The new Red Sox home stadium, Fenway Park opened on April 20, the same day as Navin Field in Detroit opened. It was supposed to be opened on April 18 (like Navin Field) but it rained in both cities on that day. This first Major-League game played at Fenway Park pitted the Red Sox against the New York Highlanders, with the Red Sox winning by a score of 7–6, and New York's Harry Wolter being the first player to earn a hit in the park.

On April 26, Hugh Bradley became the first player to hit a home run over the Green Monster at Fenway Park. It was his only home run of the 1912 season, and one of only two he hit in his career, which spanned five seasons.

=== Transactions ===
June 25: The Cleveland Naps sell infielder Neal Ball to the Red Sox for $2500.

=== Season standings ===
American League
Team	W	L	Pct.	GB	Home	Road
Boston Red Sox	105	47	.691	—	57‍–‍20	48‍–‍27
Washington Senators	91	61	.599	14	45‍–‍32	46‍–‍29
Philadelphia Athletics	90	62	.592	15	45‍–‍31	45‍–‍31
Chicago White Sox	78	76	.506	28	34‍–‍43	44‍–‍33
Cleveland Naps	75	78	.490	30½	41‍–‍35	34‍–‍43
Detroit Tigers	69	84	.451	36½	37‍–‍39	32‍–‍45
St. Louis Browns	53	101	.344	53	27‍–‍50	26‍–‍51
New York Highlanders	50	102	.329	55	31‍–‍44	19‍–‍58

=== Record vs. opponents ===
1912 American League record Sources:
Team	BOS	CWS	CLE	DET	NYH	PHA	SLB	WSH
Boston	—	16–6–1	11–11–1	15–6	19–2	15–7	17–5	12–10
Chicago	6–16–1	—	11–11	14–8–1	13–9	12–10	13–9–2	9–13
Cleveland	11–11–1	11–11	—	13–9	13–8–1	8–14	15–7	4–18
Detroit	6–15	8–14–1	9–13	—	16–6	9–13	13–9	8–14
New York	2–19	9–13	8–13–1	6–16	—	5–17	13–9	7–15
Philadelphia	7–15	10–12	14–8	13–9	17–5	—	16–6	13–7–1
St. Louis	5–17	9–13–2	7–15	9–13	9–13	6–16	—	8–14–1
Washington	10–12	13–9	18–4	14–8	15–7	7–13–1	14–8–1	—

=== Opening Day lineup ===
On April 11, 1912, the Red Sox defeated the New York Highlanders 5–3 in an away game.

Harry Hooper	RF
Steve Yerkes	2B
Tris Speaker	CF
Jake Stahl	1B
Larry Gardner	3B
Duffy Lewis	LF
Heinie Wagner	SS
Les Nunamaker	C
Buck O'Brien	P

=== Roster ===
1912 Boston Red Sox
Roster
Pitchers: Hugh Bedient; Jack Bushelman; Eddie Cicotte; Ray Collins; Casey Hageman; Charley Hall; Buck O'Brien; Larry Pape; Doug Smith; Ben Van Dyke; Smoky Joe Wood	Catchers: Hick Cady; Bill Carrigan; Les Nunamaker; Pinch Thomas; Infielders: Neal Ball; Hugh Bradley; Clyde Engle; Larry Gardner; Marty Krug; Jake Stahl; Heinie Wagner; Steve Yerkes	Outfielders: Olaf Henriksen; Harry Hooper; Duffy Lewis; Tris Speaker	Manager: Jake Stahl

== Season log ==
Boston win	Boston loss	Tie game

1912 Boston Red Sox Season Log: 105–47–2
April

#	Date	Opponent	Score	Win	Loss	Record	Box Score
1	April 11	@ New York	5–3	Joe Wood (1–0)	Ray Caldwell (0–1)	1–0	
2	April 12	@ New York	5–2	Buck O'Brien (1–0)	Russ Ford (0–1)	2–0	
3	April 13	@ New York	8–4	Charley Hall (1–0)	Hippo Vaughn (0–1)	3–0	
4	April 15	@ Philadelphia	1─4	Eddie Plank (1─0)	Eddie Cicotte (0─1)	3─1	
5	April 16	@ Philadelphia	9─2	Joe Wood (2─0)	Harry Krause (0─1)	4─1	
6	April 20	Vs. New York	6─7	Charley Hall (2─0)	Hippo Vaughn (0─2)	5─1	

== Player stats ==
= Indicates team leader

=== Batting ===
Note: Pos = Position; G = Games played; AB = At bats; H = Hits; Avg. = Batting average; HR = Home runs; RBI = Runs batted in

==== Starters by position ====
Pos	Player	G	AB	H	Avg.	HR	RBI
C	Bill Carrigan	87	266	70	.263	0	24
1B	Jake Stahl	95	326	98	.301	3	60
2B	Steve Yerkes	131	523	132	.252	0	42
SS	Heinie Wagner	144	504	138	.274	2	68
3B	Larry Gardner	143	517	163	.315	3	86
OF	Duffy Lewis	154	581	165	.284	6	109
OF	Tris Speaker	153	580	222	.383	10	90
OF	Harry Hooper	147	590	143	.242	2	53

==== Other batters ====
Note: G = Games played; AB = At bats; H = Hits; Avg. = Batting average; HR = Home runs; RBI = Runs batted in

Player	G	AB	H	Avg.	HR	RBI
Clyde Engle	58	171	40	.234	0	18
Hugh Bradley	40	137	26	.190	1	19
Hick Cady	47	135	35	.259	0	9
Les Nunamaker	35	103	26	.252	0	6
Olaf Henriksen	44	56	18	.321	0	8
Neal Ball	18	45	9	.200	0	6
Marty Krug	20	39	12	.308	0	7
Pinch Thomas	13	30	6	.200	0	5
All pitchers	154	468	101	.216	2	44

=== Pitching ===
Note: G = Games pitched; IP = Innings pitched; W = Wins; L = Losses; ERA = Earned run average; SO = Strikeouts

==== Starting pitchers ====
Player	G	IP	W	L	ERA	SO
Smoky Joe Wood	43	344	34	5	1.91	258
Buck O'Brien	37	275 2/3	20	13	2.58	115
Hugh Bedient	41	231	20	9	2.92	122
Ray Collins	27	199 1/3	13	8	2.53	82
Charley Hall	34	191	15	8	3.02	83

==== Other pitchers ====
Note: G = Games pitched; IP = Innings pitched; W = Wins; L = Losses; ERA = Earned run average; SO = Strikeouts

Player	G	IP	W	L	ERA	SO
Larry Pape	13	48 2/3	1	1	4.99	17
Ed Cicotte	9	46	1	3	5.67	20
Ben Van Dyke	3	14 1/3	0	0	3.14	8
Casey Hageman	2	1 1/3	0	0	27.00	1

==== Relief pitchers ====
Note: G = Games pitched; W = Wins; L = Losses; SV = Saves; ERA = Earned run average; SO = Strikeouts

Player	G	W	L	SV	ERA	SO
Jack Bushelman	3	1	0	0	4.70	5
Doug Smith	1	0	0	0	3.00	1

== Awards and honors ==
=== League top five finishers ===
Duffy Lewis

- #2 in AL in RBI (109)

Tris Speaker

- MLB leader in on-base percentage (.464)
- AL leader in home runs (10)
- #2 in AL in runs scored (136)
- #3 in AL in batting average (.383)
- #3 in AL in slugging percentage (.567)
- #4 in AL in stolen bases (52)

Smoky Joe Wood

- MLB leader in wins (34)
- MLB leader in shutouts (10)
- #2 in AL in ERA (1.91)
- #2 in AL in strikeouts (258)

== World Series ==
The 1912 World Series was played between the New York Giants of the NL and the Red Sox of the AL. The Red Sox won in eight games, 4–3, having played the Giants to a tie in Game 2.

AL Boston Red Sox (4) vs. NL New York Giants (3)

Game	Score	Date	Location	Att.	Ref.
1	Red Sox – 4, Giants – 3	October 8	Polo Grounds	35,730	
2	Giants – 6, Red Sox – 6 (11)	October 9	Fenway Park	30,148	
3	Giants – 2, Red Sox – 1	October 10	Fenway Park	34,624	
4	Red Sox – 3, Giants – 1	October 11	Polo Grounds	36,502	
5	Giants – 1, Red Sox – 2	October 12	Fenway Park	34,683	
6	Red Sox – 2, Giants – 5	October 14	Polo Grounds	30,622	
7	Giants – 11, Red Sox – 4	October 15	Fenway Park	32,694	
8	Giants – 2, Red Sox – 3 (10)	October 16	Fenway Park	17,034	

== See also ==
- List of Boston Red Sox team records
