= Gene Dale =

American baseball player (1889–1958)

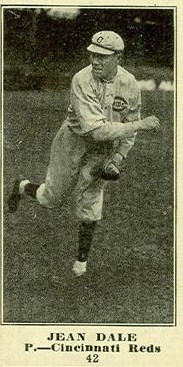
- Dale's 1916 trading card
- Pitcher
- Born: June 16, 1889; St. Louis, Missouri, U.S.
- Died: March 20, 1958 (aged 68); St. Louis, Missouri, U.S.
- Batted: Right Threw: Right

MLB debut
- September 19, 1911, for the St. Louis Cardinals

Last MLB appearance
- July 2, 1916, for the Cincinnati Reds

MLB statistics
- Win–loss record: 21–28
- Earned run average: 3.60
- Strikeouts: 177
- Stats at Baseball Reference

Teams
- St. Louis Cardinals (1911–1912); Cincinnati Reds (1915–1916)

Emmett Eugene Dale (June 16, 1889 – March 20, 1958), sometimes referred to as Jean Dale, was an American professional baseball player. Dale was a pitcher, and played in Major League Baseball (MLB) for the St. Louis Cardinals (1911–1912) and Cincinnati Reds (1915–1916). He also played in minor league baseball. He was expelled from organized baseball in 1921 for game fixing.

== Early life ==
Dale was born to Thomas J. Dale, a bricklayer, and Sylvia Dale (née Kahlert) in St. Louis, Missouri, on June 16, 1889. He was the oldest of five children.

== Career ==
Dale began playing baseball in the semi-professional Trolley League in St. Louis in 1908. In 1910, he debuted in minor league baseball as a pitcher for the Dallas Giants of the Class C Texas League, which became league co-champions that season. He pitched to a 10–7 win–loss record in 204 innings pitched. Though the Boston Red Sox of the American League gave Dale a tryout before the 1911 season, he did not make their roster, and Dale returned to Dallas. After pitching to a 12–8 win–loss record with 179 strikeouts for Dallas in 1911, the St. Louis Cardinals of the National League (NL) purchased Dale from the Giants towards the end of the season. He made his Major League Baseball debut with the Cardinals on September 19, and pitched to a 0–2 record with a 6.75 earned run average (ERA) in 14 2/3 innings.

The Cardinals returned Dale to Dallas at the end of the season, but reacquired him during the offseason. After Dale pitched to a 0–5 record and a 6.57 ERA for the Cardinals in the 1912 season, they sold Dale to the Montreal Royals of the Class AA International League (IL) that August. Dale pitched to a 4–6 in 10 games started for the remainder of the 1912 season, a 13–10 record during the 1913 season, and a 10–17 record in the 1914 season.

Seeking more pitchers, the Cincinnati Reds of the NL drafted Dale from the Royals before the 1915 season. Despite reports that he would be returned to Montreal, catcher Red Dooin convinced the Reds to keep Dale, and he made the Reds' Opening Day roster. Dale proceeded to win 18 games with the Reds during the 1915 season, recording a 2.46 ERA. Dale struggled in 1916, and was removed from the starting rotation and demoted to the bullpen. After traveling to St. Louis without permission of the team, the Reds suspended Dale and sold him to the Indianapolis Indians of the Class AA American Association.

With the Indians, Dale was a member of the 1917 Junior World Series champions. Dale led the American Association with a 1.50 ERA in the 1918 season, tying with John Merritt. Dale pitched for the Indians through the 1919 season, when they released him after he started the year with two losing outings. He then signed with the Salt Lake City Bees in the Class AA Pacific Coast League (PCL). The Bees were locked in a late season pennant race with the Vernon Tigers that season. The Tigers won the pennant after they defeated the Bees in nine out of 11 games played late in the season, which included three poor performances from Dale. He was suspected of game fixing.

The Bees traded Dale to the Dallas Submarines of the Class B Texas League for Eddie Matheson in 1920, as the president of the PCL began to investigate the game fixing allegations. Salt Lake City's Harl Maggert and Vernon's Babe Borton, who were implicated in the investigation, were suspended in August 1920. Borton then implicated other players, including Dale. Dale refused to testify in front of a California grand jury, but appeared at a meeting with minor league executives in Kansas City, Missouri, where he claimed he was innocent. Following the dismissal of criminal charges against Maggert and Borton, the National Association of Professional Baseball Leagues, which governed minor league baseball, expelled Dale, Borton, Maggert and Bill Rumler on January 12, 1921. This expulsion provided Kenesaw Mountain Landis with the precedent needed to ban the conspirators involved in the Black Sox Scandal.

Dale continued to pitch in semi-professional baseball for the Cape Girardeau Capahas in 1921. He was honored after the season at a banquet held by the St. Louis Chamber of Commerce. Dale appeared in one game for the Newark Bears of the IL that year, but was removed from the roster once word reached the league's offices.

== Later life ==
After the end of his baseball career, Dale worked for the Steel Products Corporation as a plater. He married a woman named Glen in 1929. The couple had no children.

Dale died in St. Louis at the age of 68.
