= Fred Walden =

American baseball player (1890-1955)

- Catcher
- Born: June 25, 1890; Fayette, Missouri
- Died: December 27, 1955 (aged 65); Jefferson Barracks, Missouri
- Batted: Right Threw: Right

MLB debut
- June 3, 1912, for the St. Louis Browns

Last MLB appearance
- June 3, 1912, for the St. Louis Browns

MLB statistics
- Games played: 1
- Plate appearances: 0
- Stats at Baseball Reference

Teams
- St. Louis Browns (1912)

Thomas Fred Walden (June 25, 1890 – September 27, 1955) was a Major League Baseball catcher who played for one season. He played for the St. Louis Browns for one game on June 3 during the 1912 St. Louis Browns season.
