= Doug Smith (pitcher) =

American baseball player (1893–1973)

- Pitcher
- Born: May 25, 1893; Millers Falls, Massachusetts, U.S.
- Died: September 18, 1973 (aged 80); Greenfield, Massachusetts, U.S.
- Batted: Left Threw: Left

MLB debut
- July 10, 1912, for the Boston Red Sox

Last MLB appearance
- July 10, 1912, for the Boston Red Sox

MLB statistics
- Win–loss record: 0-0
- Earned run average: 3.00
- Strikeouts: 1
- Stats at Baseball Reference

Teams
- Boston Red Sox (1912)

Douglass Weldon Smith (May 25, 1893 – September 18, 1973) was an American relief pitcher in Major League Baseball who played briefly for the Boston Red Sox during the 1912 season. Listed at 5 ft 10 in (1.78 m), 168 lb., Smith batted and threw left-handed. He was born in Millers Falls, Massachusetts.

In a one-game career, Smith posted a 3.00 ERA in 3.0 innings of work, including one strikeout and four hits allowed without a decision, walks or saves. Smith served in the U.S. Army as a private during WWI.

== Personal life ==
A mix of Narragansett/Nehantic and/or Pequot. Judah was raised by his Indian mother, Betsy Strong, and his stepfather, Charles Scott I, a dark-skinned man of Pequot and African lineage. Smith died at the age of 81 in Millers Falls, Massachusetts.

== Fact ==
- Was a member of the 1912 American League champions Red Sox, although he did not play in the World Series.

== See also ==
- 1912 Boston Red Sox season
