= Eddie Onslow =

American baseball player (1893–1981)

- First baseman
- Born: February 17, 1893; Meadville, Pennsylvania, U.S.
- Died: May 8, 1981 (aged 88); Dennison, Ohio, U.S.
- Batted: Left Threw: Left

MLB debut
- August 7, 1912, for the Detroit Tigers

Last MLB appearance
- September 14, 1927, for the Washington Senators

MLB statistics
- Batting average: .232
- Home runs: 1
- Runs batted in: 22
- Stats at Baseball Reference

Teams
- Detroit Tigers (1912–1913); Cleveland Indians (1918); Washington Senators (1927)

Edward Joseph Onslow (February 17, 1893 – May 8, 1981) was an American first baseman in Major League Baseball who played for the Detroit Tigers (1912–13), Cleveland Indians (1918) and Washington Senators (1927).

== Formative years ==
Born in Meadville, Pennsylvania on February 17, 1893, Edde Onslow was the younger brother of Jack Onslow, a catcher, coach and scout in the major leagues, and the manager of the 1949–50 Chicago White Sox.

== Career ==
Onslow threw and batted left-handed, stood 6 feet (1.8 m) tall and weighed 170 pounds (77 kg). His playing career in professional baseball lasted for two decades (1911–29; 1931), and included seven consecutive outstanding seasons (1918–24) for the Toronto Maple Leafs of the International League, during which Onslow hit over .300 each year and made his managerial debut as playing skipper of the 1922 Leafs. He led the team to a 76–88 record. Like his elder brother, Onslow also was a longtime minor league manager. He also scouted for the White Sox and Philadelphia Athletics.

In parts of four major league seasons he played in 64 games, with 207 at bats, 19 runs scored, 48 hits, three doubles, two triples, one home run, 22 runs batted in, four stolen bases, nine bases on balls, a .232 batting average, .271 on-base percentage, .280 slugging percentage, 58 total bases and four sacrifice hits.

== Later years and death ==
Onslow was elected to the International League Hall of Fame in 1951. He died thirty years later in Dennison, Ohio, on May 8, 1981, at the age of 88.

Preceded by Lena Blackburne	Toronto Maple Leafs manager 1922	Succeeded by Dan Howley
