= Hardin Barry =

American baseball player (1891-1969)

- Pitcher
- Born: March 26, 1891; Susanville, California
- Died: November 5, 1969 (aged 78); Carson City, Nevada
- Batted: Right Threw: Right

MLB debut
- June 21, 1912, for the Philadelphia Athletics

Last MLB appearance
- July 13, 1912, for the Philadelphia Athletics

MLB statistics
- Win–loss record: 0–0
- Earned run average: 7.62
- Strikeouts: 3
- Stats at Baseball Reference

Teams
- Philadelphia Athletics (1912)

Hardin Barry (March 26, 1891 – November 5, 1969), nicknamed "Finn", was an American Major League Baseball pitcher for one season prior to a lifetime career in law.

== History ==
Born in Susanville, California, he started his career at Santa Clara University then called Santa Clara College. After graduation in 1912 he had a one-season career in the majors for the Philadelphia Athletics during the 1912 season. He went directly to the majors with no minor career, yet played in only three games, earning a 7.62 Earned Run Average (ERA).

He studied law under his father, and on March 1, 1918, he won his first case at Judge Koken's court at Standish. He worked as an attorney in Susanville. He was considered the "Dean of Lassen County Bar" when he died in Carson City, Nevada on November 5, 1969, during a visit to a daughter.
