= Ed Miller (first baseman) =

American baseball player (1888–1980)

- First baseman
- Born: November 24, 1888; Annville, Pennsylvania, U.S.
- Died: April 17, 1980 (aged 91); Lebanon, Pennsylvania, U.S.
- Batted: Right Threw: Right

MLB debut
- September 18, 1912, for the St. Louis Browns

Last MLB appearance
- July 3, 1918, for the Cleveland Indians

MLB statistics
- Batting average: .195
- Home runs: 0
- Runs batted in: 12
- Stats at Baseball Reference

Teams
- St. Louis Browns (1912, 1914); Cleveland Indians (1918)

Edwin Collins Miller (November 24, 1888 – April 17, 1980) was an American Major League Baseball first baseman who played for three seasons. He played for the St. Louis Browns in 1912 and 1914 and the Cleveland Indians in 1918.
