= Babe Borton =

American baseball player (1888–1954)

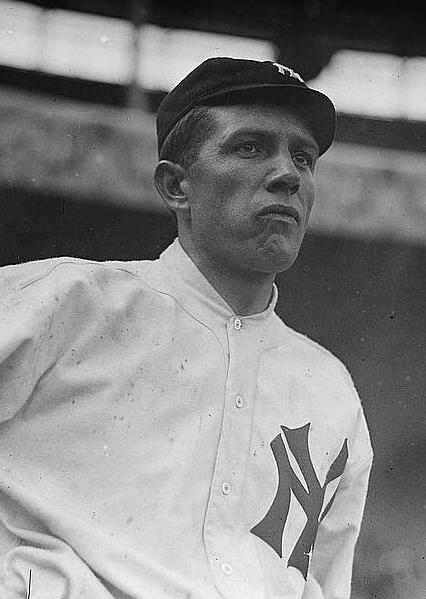
- First baseman
- Born: August 14, 1888; Marion, Illinois, U.S.
- Died: July 29, 1954 (aged 65); Berkeley, California, U.S.
- Batted: Left Threw: Left

MLB debut
- September 2, 1912, for the Chicago White Sox

Last MLB appearance
- September 10, 1916, for the St. Louis Browns

MLB statistics
- Batting average: .270
- Home runs: 4
- Runs batted in: 136
- Stats at Baseball Reference

Teams
- Chicago White Sox (1912–1913); New York Yankees (1913); St. Louis Terriers (1915); St. Louis Browns (1916)

William Baker "Babe" Borton (August 14, 1888 – July 29, 1954) was an American Major League Baseball first baseman. Borton played for the Chicago White Sox, New York Yankees, St. Louis Terriers, and St. Louis Browns from 1912 to 1916. He stood 6 ft 0 in (1.83 m).

== Biography ==
Borton was born in Marion, Illinois in 1888. He started his professional baseball career in 1910, at the age of 21. In 1912, he was hitting .369 in the Western League when he was acquired by the Chicago White Sox late in the season. He played one season for them before being traded with Rollie Zeider to the New York Yankees for Hal Chase. He hit just .130 in 33 games for New York and was released. In 1914, he played in the Pacific Coast League.

1915 was Borton's only full major league campaign. With the St. Louis Terriers, he led the Federal League in walks (92) and runs scored (97) and was fourth in on-base percentage (.395). After the season, the Federal League folded, and Borton was purchased by the American League's Browns. He hit just .224 in 1916 and never played in the majors again. From 1917 to 1920, he played in the Pacific Coast League. He batted .303 in 1919, as his team – the Vernon Tigers – won the pennant. In 1920, he was batting .326 late in the season when he was suspended.

In July 1920, Borton had tried to bribe an opposing pitcher into throwing a game. As details in the scandal emerged, it was discovered that he and some Vernon teammates had also bribed opponents in 1919 to throw the pennant to the Tigers. Borton was eventually cleared of any criminal charges in December, but along with Harl Maggert, Gene Dale, and Bill Rumler, Borton was expelled from the Pacific Coast League.

Borton never played in organized baseball after 1920. He later worked for Standard Oil until his death in 1954.

== See also ==
- List of Major League Baseball annual runs scored leaders
