= Slim Harrell =

American baseball player

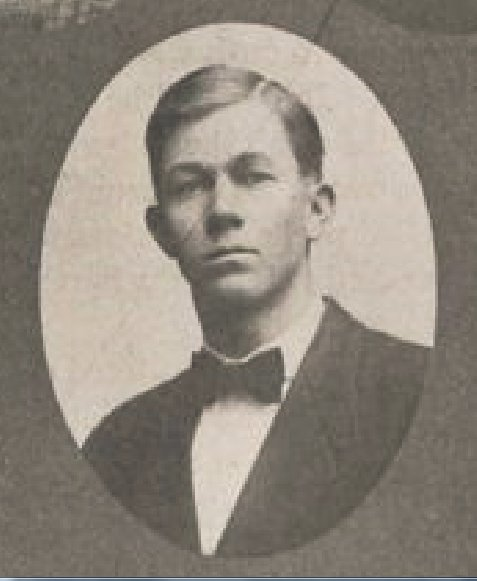
- Harrell at Baylor in 1911
- Pitcher
- Born: July 31, 1890; Grandview, Texas, U.S.
- Died: April 30, 1971 (aged 80); Hillsboro, Texas, U.S.
- Batted: Right Threw: Right

MLB debut
- June 21, 1912, for the Philadelphia Athletics

Last MLB appearance
- June 21, 1912, for the Philadelphia Athletics

MLB statistics
- Win–loss record: 0-0
- Earned run average: 0.00
- Strikeouts: 1
- Stats at Baseball Reference

Teams
- Philadelphia Athletics (1912)

Oscar Martin "Slim" Harrell (July 31, 1890 – April 30, 1971) was an American Major League Baseball pitcher. He played for the Philadelphia Athletics during the 1912 season. He attended Baylor University.

His Baylor yearbook lauded him as one of the premier college pitchers in the State. Despite this, he only appeared in one Major League game.
