= Joe Wagner =

American baseball player (1889–1948)

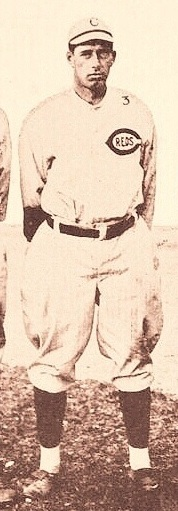
- Second baseman / Shortstop
- Born: April 24, 1889; New York, New York, U.S.
- Died: November 15, 1948 (aged 59); Brooklyn, New York, U.S.
- Batted: Right Threw: Right

MLB debut
- April 25, 1915, for the Cincinnati Reds

Last MLB appearance
- October 3, 1915, for the Cincinnati Reds

MLB statistics
- Batting average: .178
- Hits: 35
- Runs batted in: 13
- Stats at Baseball Reference

Teams
- Cincinnati Reds (1915)

Joseph Bernard Wagner (April 24, 1889 – November 15, 1948) was an American Major League Baseball player for the Cincinnati Reds in the 1915 season. Wagner played second base and batted and threw right-handed. Wagner played minor league baseball for the York White Roses of the Class B Tri-State League. He was born in New York City and died in Bronx, New York.
