= Howard Fahey =

American baseball player (1892-1971)

- Infielder
- Born: June 24, 1892; Medford, Massachusetts, U.S.
- Died: October 24, 1971 (aged 79); Clearwater, Florida, U.S.
- Batted: Right Threw: Right

MLB debut
- July 23, 1912, for the Philadelphia Athletics

Last MLB appearance
- September 14, 1912, for the Philadelphia Athletics

MLB statistics
- Games played: 5
- Batting average: .000
- Runs batted in: 0
- Stats at Baseball Reference

Teams
- Philadelphia Athletics (1912)

Howard Simpson Fahey (June 24, 1892 – October 24, 1971) was an American Major League Baseball infielder. He played for the Philadelphia Athletics during the 1912 season. He attended Dartmouth College.
