= Mutz Ens =

American baseball player (1887–1950)

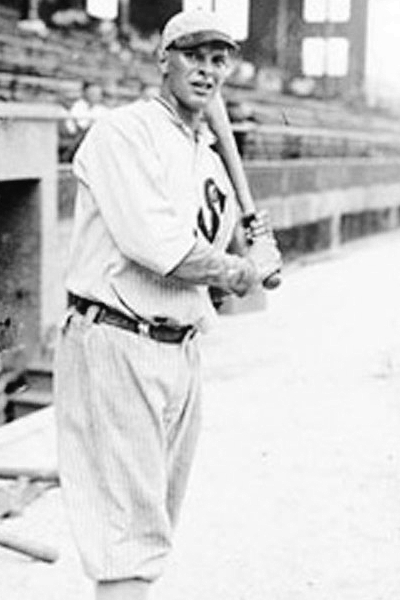
- First baseman
- Born: February 2, 1887; St. Louis, Missouri, U.S.
- Died: June 28, 1950 (aged 63); St. Louis, Missouri, U.S.
- Batted: Left Threw: Left

MLB debut
- September 2, 1912, for the Chicago White Sox

Last MLB appearance
- September 7, 1912, for the Chicago White Sox

MLB statistics
- Games played: 3
- At bats: 6
- Hits: 0
- Stats at Baseball Reference

Teams
- Chicago White Sox (1912)

Anton "Mutz" Ens (February 2, 1887 - June 28, 1950) played Major League Baseball in 1912 with the Chicago White Sox. He played 3 games as a first baseman and had zero hits in six at-bats. At first base he recorded 12 putouts and 2 errors for a fielding percentage of .857. His brother, Jewel Ens, also played professional baseball.

He died in his home town of St. Louis, Missouri, at the age of 65.
