= Hank Perry =

American baseball player (1886–1956)

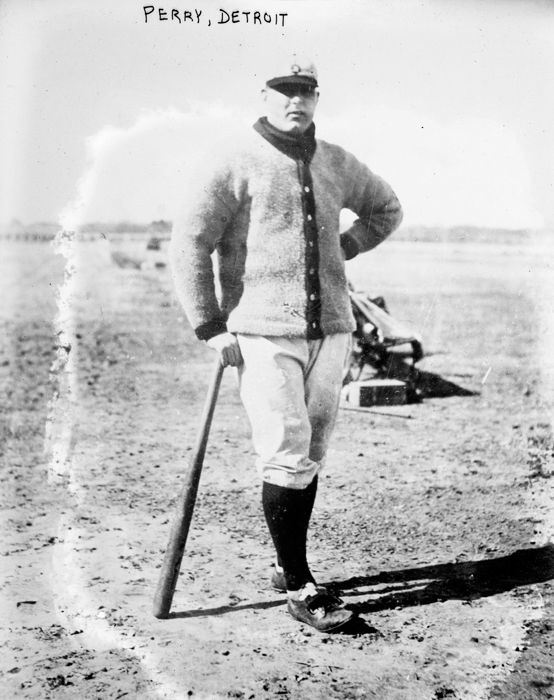
- Perry with Detroit in 1912
- Outfielder
- Born: July 28, 1886; Howell, Michigan, U.S.
- Died: July 18, 1956 (aged 69); Pontiac, Michigan, U.S.
- Batted: Left Threw: Right

MLB debut
- April 12, 1912, for the Detroit Tigers

Last MLB appearance
- May 25, 1912, for the Detroit Tigers

MLB statistics
- Batting average: .167
- Home runs: 0
- Runs batted in: 0
- Stats at Baseball Reference

Teams
- Detroit Tigers (1912)

William Henry Perry (July 28, 1886 – July 18, 1956), nicknamed "Socks," was an American baseball outfielder. He played professional baseball for 11 years from 1905 to 1915, including 13 games in Major League Baseball with the Detroit Tigers in 1912.

== Early years ==
Perry was born in 1886 in Howell, Michigan.

== Professional baseball player ==
In 1912, Perry played in 13 games for the Detroit Tigers, seven as the backup center fielder to Ty Cobb, and the rest as a pinch-hitter. Perry had a .167 career batting average, not good enough to compete for playing time in center field with Cobb.

Perry began his career in 1905 as a pitcher, but made a good showing as an outfielder with the Grand Rapids Orphans of the Central League. He was rated as "the best outfielder in the Central". He was purchased from Grand Rapids by the Detroit Tigers in late 1905 or early 1906 but did not appear in any games. The Tigers then sold him to the Indianapolis Indians of the American Association, with whom he signed in March 1906.

During his 11-year career, Perry played minor league baseball for the Grand Rapids Orphans (1905-1906), Indianapolis Indians (1906), Canton Chinamen and Watchmakers (1907-1908), York White Roses (1909), Sacramento Sacts (1910), Providence Grays (1911-1912), Buffalo Bisons (1913), Jersey City Skeeters (1913), Syracuse Stars (1914), and Bay City Beavers (1915).

He had his best season in 1911 when he compiled a .343 batting average with 21 triples in 140 games at Providence. He earned the title Independent League Batting Champ that year.

== Later years ==
Perry died in 1956 at age 69 in Pontiac, Michigan. His body was donated to the University of Michigan Medical School.
