= Harl Maggert (1930s outfielder) =

American baseball player (1914-1986)

- Outfielder
- Born: May 4, 1914; Los Angeles
- Died: July 10, 1986 (aged 72); Citrus Heights, California
- Batted: Right Threw: Right

MLB debut
- April 19, 1938, for the Boston Bees

Last MLB appearance
- October 1, 1938, for the Boston Bees

MLB statistics
- Batting average: .281
- Home runs: 3
- Runs batted in: 19
- Stats at Baseball Reference

Teams
- Boston Bees (1938)

Harl Warren Maggert (May 4, 1914 – July 10, 1986) was a professional baseball outfielder. He played one season in Major League Baseball for the Boston Bees in 1938.

Maggert's professional career spanned from 1932 to 1939. His best season was 1937, when he won the Piedmont League batting title with a .342 average. That October, he was drafted by the Bees. He played one season in Boston and spent most of it as a pinch hitter.

Maggert's father was also an outfielder in the major leagues.
