= Roger Salmon =

American baseball player (1891-1974)

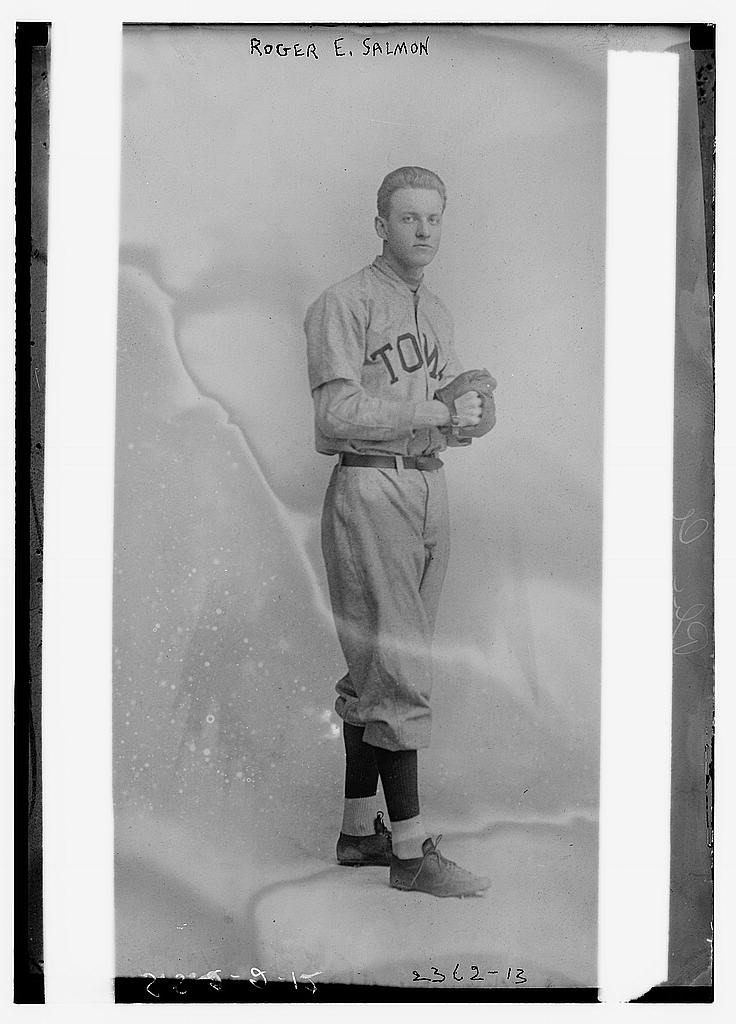
- Pitcher
- Born: May 11, 1891; Newark, New Jersey, U.S.
- Died: June 17, 1974 (aged 83); Belfast, Maine, U.S.
- Batted: Left Threw: Left

MLB debut
- May 3, 1912, for the Philadelphia Athletics

Last MLB appearance
- October 1, 1912, for the Philadelphia Athletics

MLB statistics
- Win–loss record: 1–0
- Earned run average: 9.00
- Strikeouts: 5
- Stats at Baseball Reference

Teams
- Philadelphia Athletics (1912)

Roger Elliott Salmon (May 11, 1891 – June 17, 1974) was an American professional baseball pitcher who played in 1912 with the Philadelphia Athletics of Major League Baseball. He batted and threw left-handed. Salmon had a 1–0 record, with a 9.00 ERA, in two games, in his one-year career.

== Biography ==
He was born in Newark, New Jersey on May 11, 1891. Salmon played college baseball at Princeton University. He died in Belfast, Maine on June 17, 1974.
