= Harry McCluskey =

American baseball player (1892–1962)

- Pitcher
- Born: March 29, 1892; Clay Center, Ohio, U.S.
- Died: June 7, 1962 (aged 70); Toledo, Ohio, U.S.
- Batted: Left Threw: Left

MLB debut
- July 29, 1915, for the Cincinnati Reds

Last MLB appearance
- August 20, 1915, for the Cincinnati Reds

MLB statistics
- Games played: 3
- Innings pitched: 5
- Earned run average: 5.40
- Stats at Baseball Reference

Teams
- Cincinnati Reds (1915)

Harry Robert McCluskey (March 29, 1892 – June 7, 1962) was an American pitcher in Major League Baseball. He played for the Cincinnati Reds, making only three appearances during July and August of the 1915 season during his brief career.
