= Harl Maggert (1910s outfielder) =

American baseball player (1883–1963)

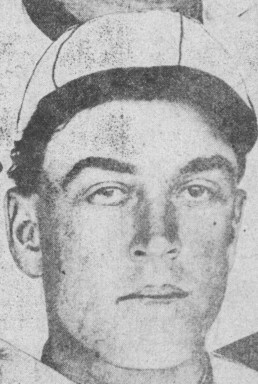
- Outfielder
- Born: February 13, 1883; Cromwell, Indiana, U.S.
- Died: January 7, 1963 (aged 79); Fresno, California, U.S.
- Batted: Left Threw: Right

MLB debut
- September 4, 1907, for the Pittsburgh Pirates

Last MLB appearance
- October 3, 1912, for the Philadelphia Athletics

MLB statistics
- Batting average: .250
- Home runs: 1
- Runs batted in: 13
- Stats at Baseball Reference

Teams
- Pittsburgh Pirates (1907); Philadelphia Athletics (1912)

Harl Vestin Maggert (February 13, 1883 – January 7, 1963) was an American Major League Baseball outfielder for the Pittsburgh Pirates and Philadelphia Athletics. He was also a star in the Pacific Coast League before being suspended in 1920 for fixing games.

== Career ==
Born in Cromwell, Indiana, Maggert began his professional baseball career in 1906. He was drafted by the Pirates after the season and played in three games for them. He went back down to the minor leagues in 1908. In 1911, he hit .314 in the Pacific Coast League and made the Athletics roster in 1912. He hit decently but left the A's after just one season.

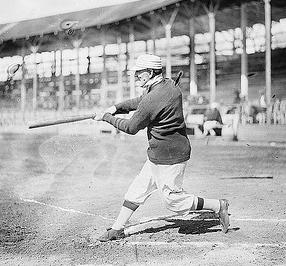
Maggert in 1912

From 1913 to 1917, Maggert was the leadoff hitter for the PCL's Los Angeles Angels. He led the league in runs scored in 1913, 1914, and 1915, with over 125 all three times. He also paced the circuit in triples twice.

Maggert played for the San Francisco Seals in 1918 and the Salt Lake City Bees in 1919 and 1920. In 1919, he led the league in runs scored for the fourth time. In 1920, Maggert had the best season of his entire career. He was hitting .370 and on his way to the batting title – until he was suspended in midseason.

=== Pacific Coast League scandal ===
In late July 1920, Vernon Tigers first baseman Babe Borton handed Maggert $300, which aroused suspicion. Borton had previously offered the money to one of Maggert's teammates. In the ensuing investigation, it was discovered that Maggert and other Salt Lake City players had thrown games during the previous season so that Borton's Tigers could win the pennant.

Maggert was soon released by the Bees. In December, he and Borton were both cleared of all criminal charges in court. However, Maggert, Borton, Gene Dale, and Bill Rumler were expelled from the Pacific Coast League. Maggert never played in organized baseball again.

== Later life ==
Over the next few years, Maggert played in "outlaw" baseball leagues along with other suspended players, such as the Black Sox.

Maggert died in 1963 in Fresno, California. His son was also a major league outfielder.
