= Brad Kocher =

American baseball player (1888–1965)

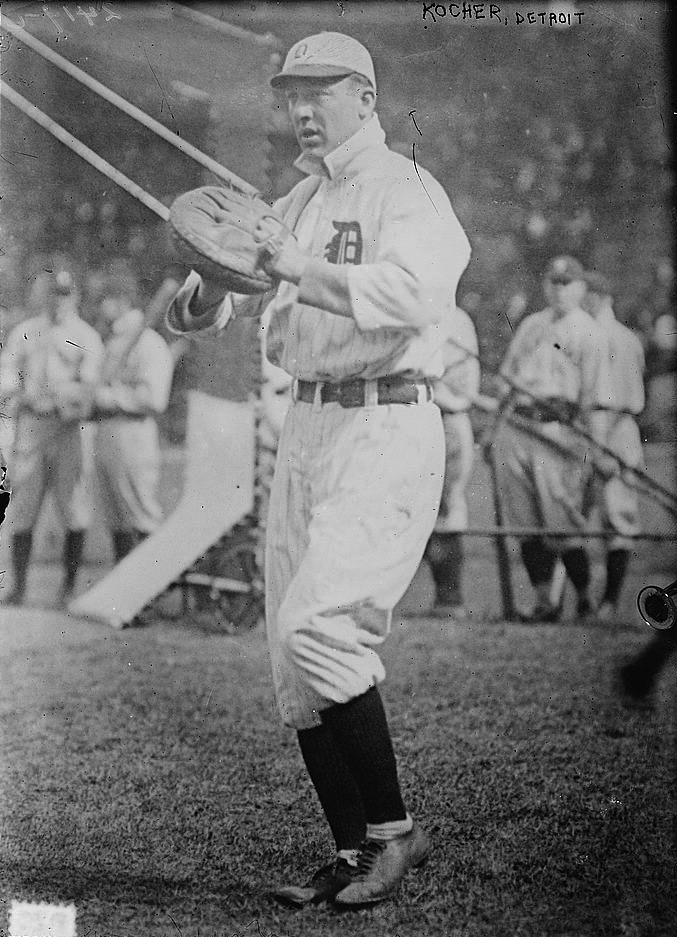
- Catcher
- Born: January 16, 1888; White Haven, Pennsylvania, U.S.
- Died: February 13, 1965 (aged 77); White Haven, Pennsylvania, U.S.
- Batted: Right Threw: Right

MLB debut
- April 24, 1912, for the Detroit Tigers

Last MLB appearance
- October 5, 1916, for the New York Giants

MLB statistics
- Batting average: .180
- Home runs: 0
- Runs batted in: 12
- Stats at Baseball Reference

Teams
- Detroit Tigers (1912); New York Giants (1915–1916)

Bradley Wilson Kocher (January 16, 1888 – February 13, 1965) was an American catcher in Major League Baseball. He played for the Detroit Tigers and New York Giants.
