= Goat Cochran =

American baseball player (1891–1947)

- Pitcher
- Born: January 31, 1891; Concord, Georgia
- Died: May 23, 1947 (aged 56); Atlanta, Georgia
- Batted: Right Threw: Right

MLB debut
- August 25, 1915, for the Cincinnati Reds

Last MLB appearance
- August 25, 1915, for the Cincinnati Reds

MLB statistics
- Games pitched: 1
- Innings pitched: 2.0
- Earned run average: 9.00
- Stats at Baseball Reference

Teams
- Cincinnati Reds (1915)

Alvah Jackson Cochran (January 31, 1891 – May 23, 1947) was a professional baseball pitcher who played in one game for the Cincinnati Reds on August 25, 1915.
