= Pat McGehee =

American baseball player (1888–1946)

- Pitcher
- Born: July 2, 1888; Meadville, Mississippi
- Died: December 30, 1946 (aged 58); Paducah, Kentucky
- Batted: Right Threw: Right

MLB debut
- August 23, 1912, for the Detroit Tigers

Last MLB appearance
- August 23, 1912, for the Detroit Tigers

MLB statistics
- Games pitched: 1
- Batters faced: 2
- Innings pitched: 0.0
- Stats at Baseball Reference

Teams
- Detroit Tigers (1912)

Patrick Henry McGehee (July 2, 1888 – December 30, 1946) was a Major League Baseball pitcher who played in one game for the Detroit Tigers on August 23, 1912. He faced two batters, and allowed one hit and one base on balls.
