= Bill Brown (outfielder) =

American baseball player (1893-1965)

- Left fielder
- Born: July 8, 1893; Coleman, Texas, U.S.
- Died: May 13, 1965 (aged 71); Lubbock, Texas, U.S.
- Batted: Right Threw: Left

MLB debut
- August 15, 1912, for the St. Louis Browns

Last MLB appearance
- September 13, 1912, for the St. Louis Browns

MLB statistics
- Batting average: .200
- Home runs: 0
- Runs batted in: 1
- Stats at Baseball Reference

Teams
- St. Louis Browns (1912)

William Verna Brown (July 8, 1893 – May 13, 1965), nicknamed "Verno", was an American Major League Baseball left fielder who played with the St. Louis Browns in 1912.
