= Charlie Snell =

American baseball player (1893-1988)

- Catcher
- Born: November 29, 1893; Hampstead, Maryland, U.S.
- Died: April 4, 1988 (aged 94); Reading, Pennsylvania, U.S.
- Batted: Right Threw: Right

MLB debut
- July 19, 1912, for the St. Louis Browns

Last MLB appearance
- August 14, 1912, for the St. Louis Browns

MLB statistics
- Batting average: .211
- Home runs: 0
- Runs batted in: 0
- Stats at Baseball Reference

Teams
- St. Louis Browns (1912)

Charles Anthony Snell (born Charles Anthony Schnell; November 29, 1893 – April 4, 1988), was an American Major League Baseball catcher who played in 1912 with the St. Louis Browns. He batted and threw right-handed. Snell had a .211 batting average in 8 games, with 4 hits in 19 at-bats, during his one-year career.

After his time, with St. Louis, he played minor league baseball with the Montgomery Rebels and Memphis Chickasaws of the Southern Association in 1913, the two Toronto teams in 1914 and the Chambersburg Maroons of the Blue Ridge League in 1915.

He was born in Hampstead, Maryland, and died in Reading, Pennsylvania.
