= Charlie Miller (shortstop) =

American baseball shortstop (1892-1972)

- Shortstop
- Born: January 4, 1892; Warrensburg, Missouri
- Died: April 23, 1972 (aged 80); Warrensburg, Missouri
- Batted: Unknown Threw: Right

MLB debut
- June 29, 1912, for the St. Louis Browns

Last MLB appearance
- September 18, 1912, for the St. Louis Browns

MLB statistics
- Games played: 2
- At bats: 2
- Hits: 0

Teams
- St. Louis Browns (1912)

Charles Elmer Miller (January 4, 1892 – April 23, 1972) was an American Major League Baseball shortstop who played for the St. Louis Browns in 1912. He is the only player in the history of MLB to have been caught stealing twice in their only game.
