= Limb McKenry =

American baseball player (1888–1956)

- Pitcher
- Born: August 13, 1888; Piney Flats, Tennessee, U.S.
- Died: November 1, 1956 (aged 68); Fresno, California, U.S.
- Batted: Right Threw: Right

MLB debut
- July 24, 1915, for the Cincinnati Reds

Last MLB appearance
- May 5, 1916, for the Cincinnati Reds

MLB statistics
- Win–loss record: 6-6
- Earned run average: 3.10
- Strikeouts: 39
- Stats at Baseball Reference

Teams
- Cincinnati Reds (1915–1916)

Frank Gordon "Limb" McKenry (August 13, 1888 – November 1, 1956), nicknamed "Big Pete", was an American pitcher in Major League Baseball. He played for the Cincinnati Reds. On November 1, 1956, McKenry committed suicide with a shotgun in his apartment in Fresno, California.
