= Dennis Berran =

American baseball player (1887–1943)

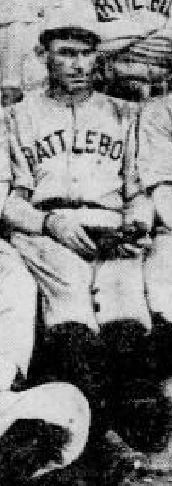
- Outfielder
- Born: October 8, 1887; Merrimac, Massachusetts, U.S.
- Died: April 28, 1943 (aged 55); Boston, Massachusetts, U.S.
- Batted: Left Threw: Left

MLB debut
- August 11, 1912, for the Chicago White Sox

Last MLB appearance
- August 11, 1912, for the Chicago White Sox

MLB statistics
- Games played: 2
- At bats: 4
- Hits: 1
- Stats at Baseball Reference

Teams
- Chicago White Sox (1912)

Dennis Martin Berran (October 8, 1887 – April 28, 1943) was an American outfielder in Major League Baseball. He played for the Chicago White Sox in 1912.
