= Alex Remneas =

American baseball player (1886–1975)

- Pitcher
- Born: February 21, 1886; Minneapolis, Minnesota, U.S.
- Died: August 27, 1975 (aged 89); Phoenix, Arizona, U.S.
- Batted: Right Threw: Right

MLB debut
- April 15, 1912, for the Detroit Tigers

Last MLB appearance
- April 20, 1915, for the St. Louis Browns

MLB statistics
- Win–loss record: 0–0
- Earned run average: 7.04
- Strikeouts: 5
- Stats at Baseball Reference

Teams
- Detroit Tigers (1912); St. Louis Browns (1915)

Alexander Norman Remneas (February 21, 1886 – August 27, 1975) was an American professional baseball player. He appeared in three games in Major League Baseball as a pitcher for the Detroit Tigers in 1912 and for the St. Louis Browns in 1915.

== Early life ==
Remneas was born in Minneapolis in 1886.

== Professional baseball ==
Remneas began his professional baseball career with the Butte Miners of the Union Association. He compiled a 22–18 record for Butte in 1911. He continued to play professional baseball from 1911 to 1915, including three games in Major League Baseball as a pitcher for the Detroit Tigers in 1912 and for the St. Louis Browns in 1915. In his three major league games, Remneas had no decisions in 7⅔ innings pitched with a 7.04 earned run average (ERA). He played in the Pacific Coast League during the 1915 season.

== Later years ==
After retiring from baseball, Remneas worked for many years with the Mountain States Telephone & Telegraph Company and moved to Phoenix, Arizona, in 1939 as an assistant state manager for Arizona. He became the state manager for Arizona and was then transferred in 1946 to Colorado. His wife Bess died in 1964. He died in Phoenix in 1975 at age 89.
