= Henry Smoyer =

American baseball player (1890-1958)

- Shortstop / Third baseman
- Born: April 25, 1890; Fredericksburg, Pennsylvania, U.S.
- Died: February 28, 1958 (aged 67); DuBois, Pennsylvania, U.S.
- Batted: Right Threw: Right

MLB debut
- August 14, 1912, for the St. Louis Browns

Last MLB appearance
- September 7, 1912, for the St. Louis Browns

MLB statistics
- Batting average: .214
- Home runs: 0
- Runs batted in: 0
- Stats at Baseball Reference

Teams
- St. Louis Browns (1912)

Henry Neitz "Hennie" Smoyer (April 25, 1890 – February 28, 1958) was an American Major League Baseball shortstop and third baseman who played in 1912 with the St. Louis Browns.
