= Flame Delhi =

American baseball player (1892–1966)

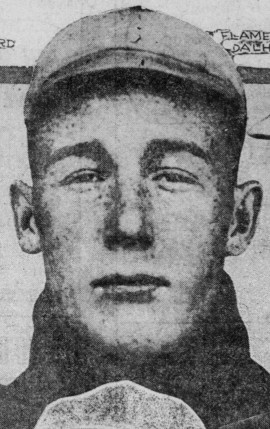
- Pitcher
- Born: November 5, 1892; Harquahala, Arizona
- Died: May 9, 1966 (aged 73); Greenbrae, California
- Batted: Right Threw: Right

MLB debut
- April 16, 1912, for the Chicago White Sox

Last MLB appearance
- April 16, 1912, for the Chicago White Sox

MLB statistics
- Win–loss record: 0–0
- Earned run average: 9.00
- Strikeouts: 2
- Stats at Baseball Reference

Teams
- Chicago White Sox (1912)

Lee William "Flame" Delhi (November 5, 1892 – May 9, 1966) was a pitcher in Major League Baseball. He played one game for the Chicago White Sox in 1912. Delhi was the first Arizona-born player to appear in the major leagues. The Arizona chapter of the Society for American Baseball Research (SABR) is named for him.
