= Fred Lamlein =

American baseball player (1887–1970)

- Pitcher
- Born: August 14, 1887; Port Huron, Michigan, U.S.
- Died: September 20, 1970 (aged 83); Port Huron, Michigan, U.S.
- Batted: Right Threw: Right

MLB debut
- September 18, 1912, for the Chicago White Sox

Last MLB appearance
- September 21, 1915, for the St. Louis Cardinals

MLB statistics
- Win–loss record: 0–0
- Earned run average: 4.29
- Strikeouts: 12
- Stats at Baseball Reference

Teams
- Chicago White Sox (1912); St. Louis Cardinals (1915)

Frederick Arthur "Dutch" Lamlein (August 14, 1887 – September 20, 1970) was an American pitcher in Major League Baseball. He played for the Chicago White Sox and St. Louis Cardinals. Lamlein was often misspelled "Lamline" on baseball cards, programs, and newspaper print items throughout his minor and major league careers. Lamlein is also credited with moving the North American Silverstick Championship Finals youth hockey tournament to his hometown in Port Huron, MI in 1963. To this day, Port Huron is still the site of this annual tournament which brings the top youth travel hockey teams from all over North America to compete for the Silverstick award.
