= Willie Jensen =

American baseball player (1889–1917)

- Pitcher
- Born: November 17, 1889; Philadelphia, Pennsylvania
- Died: March 27, 1917 (aged 27); Philadelphia, Pennsylvania
- Batted: Left Threw: Right

MLB debut
- September 10, 1912, for the Detroit Tigers

Last MLB appearance
- October 2, 1914, for the Philadelphia Athletics

MLB statistics
- Win–loss record: 1-3
- Strikeouts: 9
- Earned run average: 3.64
- Stats at Baseball Reference

Teams
- Detroit Tigers (1912); Philadelphia Athletics (1914)

William Christian Jensen (November 17, 1889 – March 27, 1917) was a Major League Baseball pitcher. He played parts of two seasons in the majors, 1912 for the Detroit Tigers and 1914 for the Philadelphia Athletics.

== Sources ==
- Career statistics from Baseball Reference
