= Frank Crossin =

American baseball player (1891-1965)

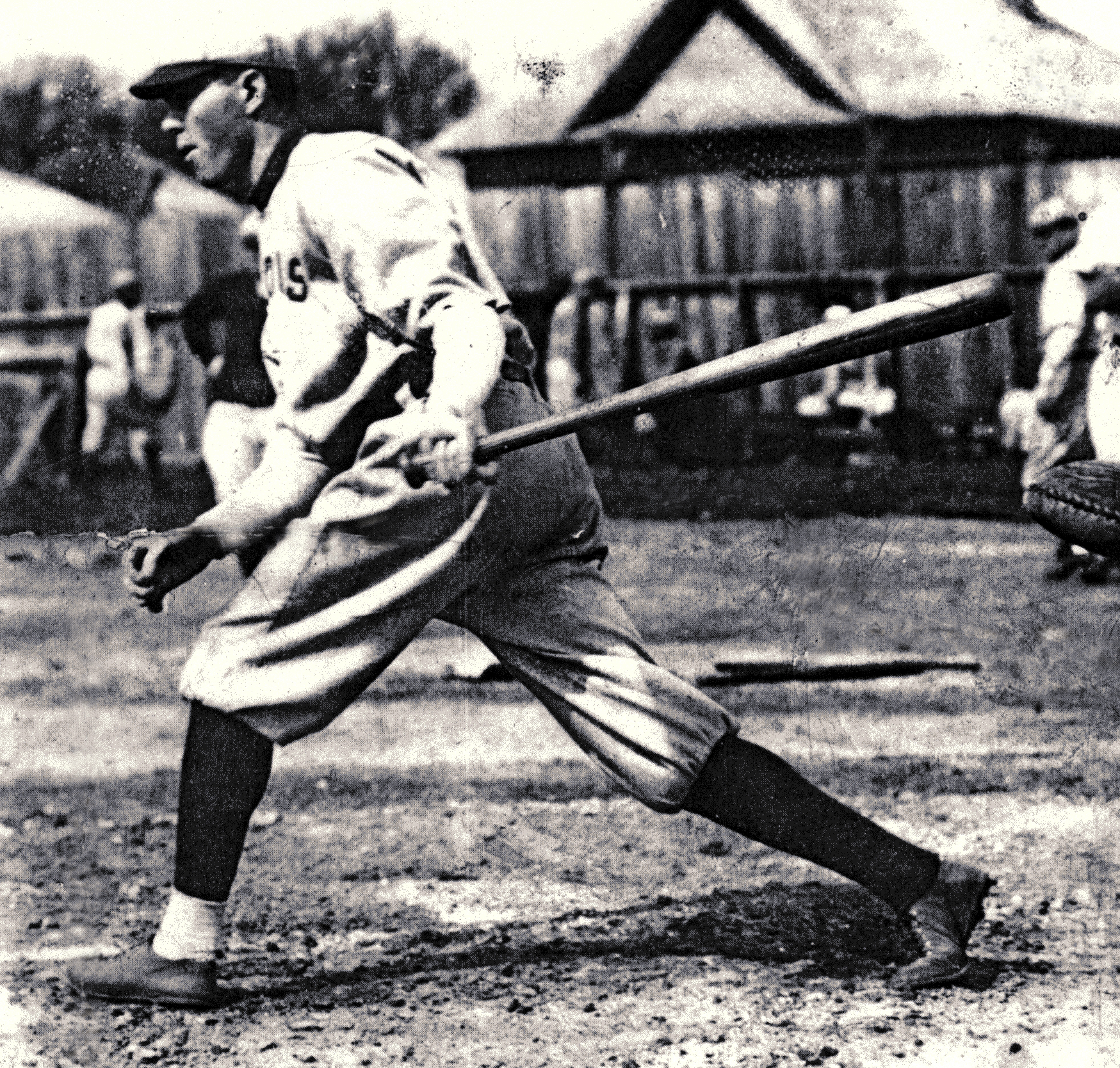
- Crossin during spring training, c. 1914–15
- Catcher
- Born: June 15, 1891; Avondale, Pennsylvania, U.S.
- Died: December 6, 1965 (aged 74); Kingston, Pennsylvania, U.S.
- Batted: Right Threw: Right

MLB debut
- September 24, 1912, for the St. Louis Browns

Last MLB appearance
- August 8, 1914, for the St. Louis Browns

MLB statistics
- Batting average: .147
- Hits: 17
- Runs batted in: 7
- Stats at Baseball Reference

Teams
- St. Louis Browns (1912–1914)

Francis Patrick Crossin, Sr. (June 15, 1891 – December 6, 1965) was an American professional baseball player whose career spanned seven seasons, three of which were spent in Major League Baseball (MLB) St. Louis Browns (1912–14). Over his Major League career, Crossin, a catcher, compiled a .147 batting average with eight runs scored, 17 hits, one double, one triple, and seven runs batted in (RBIs) in 55 games played. He made his professional debut with the minor league Binghamton Bingoes in 1912. His MLB debut came on September 24, 1912. Crossin played parts of the next two seasons in the majors. In 1915, a year after his MLB career ended, he returned to the minors. Over his career in the minors, Crossin compiled a .261 batting average with 303 hits in 381 games played. He batted, and threw right-handed. During his career, he stood at 5 feet 10 inches (178 cm), and weighed 160 pounds (73 kg).

== Early life ==
Crossin was born on June 15, 1891, in Avondale, Pennsylvania, to James, and Mary Crossin, of New York, and England, respectively. James Crossin, who was of Irish American heritage, worked as a miner, and a day laborer. Frank Crossin had nine siblings; brothers James, William, Edward, John, Joseph, and Leo; and sisters Alice, Marian, and Alberta. In 1910, Frank Crossin was working as an auto mechanic. In his youth, Crossin played amateur baseball with the Luzerne Reds, who represented Luzerne, Pennsylvania. He also played amateur baseball in Wyoming, and Susquehanna, Pennsylvania.

== Professional career ==
=== Early career, and St. Louis Browns (1912–14) ===
In 1912, Crossin signed his first professional baseball contract with the Binghamton Bingoes of the Class-B New York State League. It was reported that the Wilkes-Barre Barons were interested in Crossin, but signed with Binghamton instead. Crossin played with future, and former Major League Baseball (MLB) players Jack Barnett, Cad Coles, Rankin Johnson, Jim Jones, Harry Lumley, John McCloskey, Chick Robitaille, and Allan Sothoron. Early in the season, Crossin replaced Binghamton's regular catcher George Vandegrift at that position. Scouts from several MLB team were reportedly interested in Crossin. Times Leader described Crossin as "one of the sensations of the league", and wrote that he had a "remarkable throwing and hitting" ability. On July 11, Crossin was sold to the MLB St. Louis Browns, but was allowed to finish the season with Binghamton. With the Bingoes, he batted .235 with 63 hits in 89 games played.

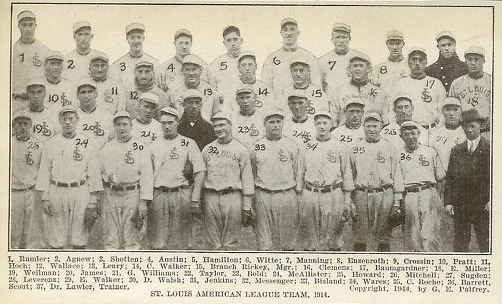
Crossin (labeled 9) spent three seasons in the Major Leagues, all with the St. Louis Browns.

Crossin was issued to report to the St. Louis Browns in September 1912. Before reporting, he returned to his home in Luzerne, Pennsylvania, where the manager, and players from his former amateur team the Luzerne Reds held a banquet in honor of Crossin. The Browns paid the Binghamton Bingoes, the team in which they purchased him from, US$1,000 for Crossin. He made his MLB debut on September 24. With the Browns that year, he played in eight games. In those games, he batted .227 with two runs scored, five hits, two runs batted in (RBIs), and one stolen base. Defensively, he played all of his games at the catcher position.

In February 1913, Crossin was issued to report to spring training for the St. Louis Browns. Crossin's friends accompanied him to the Lehigh Valley Railroad Station before he left for spring training. Crossin made the Browns roster at the start of the regular season in 1913. As a part of their earlier deal, the St. Louis club had to pay the Binghamton Bingoes US$1,500 to use Crossin's services during the 1913 season. Early in the season, he was sent down to the minor leagues. He played with his former team, the Binghamton Bingoes. In the minors that season, he batted .269 with 47 hits in 62 games played. On August 1, Crossin was recalled to the Major Leagues. He played four games with the Browns that season. In those games, he had one hit in four at-bats.

On January 20, 1914, Crossin was traded by the Binghamton Bingoes to the Nashville Vols of the Class-A Southern Association. However, he spent the entire season with the St. Louis Browns. On April 19, Crossin hit a bases loaded triple, which helped the Browns beat the Chicago White Sox. His last MLB appearance came on August 8, 1914. With the Browns that year, he batted .122 with five runs scored, 11 hits, one double, one triple, five RBIs, and three stolen bases in 43 games played.

=== Later career (1915–1920) ===
Before the start of the 1915 season, Crossin signed with the Louisville Colonels of the Double-A American Association. Out of spring training that season, Crossin made the Colonels roster. At the end of May, Crossin's batting average was .367. With the Colonels, Crossin batted .254 with 63 hits, five doubles, one double, and one triple in 83 games played. Crossin re-signed with the Louisville Colonels at the start of the 1916 season. On June 8, Crossin was sold by Louisville to the Atlanta Crackers of the Double-A Southern Association. He suffered a sore arm that year, causing him to miss the entire season.

At the start of the 1917 season, Crossin re-signed with the Louisville Colonels. In May, he was released by the Colonels. After that, he signed with the Scranton Miners of the Class-B New York State League. However, in August, the Scranton club could not pay Crossin his salary, and he was released. With the Miners, he batted .265 with 70 hits in 76 games played. Crossin was re-signed by the Colonels after he was released. He also played with the Toledo Iron Men, who also played in the American Association. Between the two teams, be batted .298 with 14 hits, and two doubles in 20 games played.

In October 1917, Crossin was drafted into the United States Army to fight in World War I. He fought in France as a member of the 35th Field Artillery Regiment. In 1919, Crossin returned from the war, and signed with the Reading Coal Barons of the Double-A International League. On July 1, Crossin fractured his fibula after sliding into second base. On the season, he batted .265 with 35 hits, 12 doubles, one triple, and one home run in 34 games played. His final professional baseball season would come in 1920. He was a member of the Reading International League team, now renamed the Marines. He batted .234 with 11 hits, one double, and one triple in 17 games played.

== Later life ==
In 1920, Crossin was living in Luzerne, Pennsylvania with his wife, Margaret Crossin, his brother, Leo, and his father, James. By 1930, Frank and Margaret Crossin had three children; sons Francis, Jr. (who became a professional basketball player) and John, and daughter Mary. They later had another son, Joseph. In 1942, Frank Crossin was self-employed. Crossin operated his business in Swoyersville, Pennsylvania, for 35 years. He died on December 6, 1965, at Nesbitt Memorial Hospital, where he had been a patient for five days, in Kingston, Pennsylvania. He was buried at St. Mary Cemetery in Wilkes-Barre, Pennsylvania.
