= Red McDermott =

American baseball player (1888–1964)

- Left fielder
- Born: November 12, 1888; Philadelphia, Pennsylvania, U.S.
- Died: September 11, 1964 (aged 75); Philadelphia, Pennsylvania, U.S.
- Batted: Right Threw: Right

MLB debut
- August 6, 1912, for the Detroit Tigers

Last MLB appearance
- August 8, 1912, for the Detroit Tigers

MLB statistics
- Games played: 5
- At bats: 15
- Hits: 4
- Stats at Baseball Reference

Teams
- Detroit Tigers (1912)

Frank A. "Red" McDermott (November 12, 1888 – September 11, 1964) was an American Major League Baseball left fielder who played in five games for the Detroit Tigers in 1912.

As opposed to his short major league career, he had a long minor league career spanning 16 seasons and 26 years. He began his professional career in 1908 with the Fort Wayne Billikens of the Central League. With the exception of the 1918 season he played continuously through 1923, his last team being the Chambersburg Maroons of the Blue Ridge League. He then retired, only to return for a single season with the 1934 Dayton Ducks of the Middle Atlantic League.
