= Roy Crabb =

American baseball player (1890–1940)

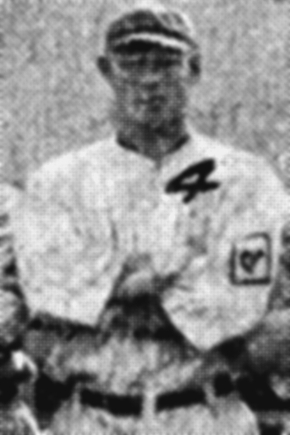
- Pitcher
- Born: August 23, 1890; Monticello, Iowa, U.S.
- Died: March 30, 1940 (aged 49); Lewistown, Montana, U.S.
- Batted: Right Threw: Right

MLB debut
- August 10, 1912, for the Chicago White Sox

Last MLB appearance
- September 21, 1912, for the Philadelphia Athletics

MLB statistics
- Win–loss record: 2–5
- Strikeouts: 15
- Earned run average: 3.29
- Stats at Baseball Reference

Teams
- Chicago White Sox (1912); Philadelphia Athletics (1912)

James Roy Crabb (August 23, 1890 – March 30, 1940) was an American Major League Baseball pitcher. He pitched part of one season, 1912, in the majors. He made his major league debut in August for the Chicago White Sox, and ten days later his contract was sold to the Philadelphia Athletics, where he finished the season. Crabb worked as a painter for the nine years prior to his premature death at age 49 of lung cancer.

== Sources ==
- Career statistics from Baseball Reference · Baseball Reference (Minors) · Retrosheet · Baseball Almanac
