= Olaf Henriksen =

American baseball player (1888–1962)

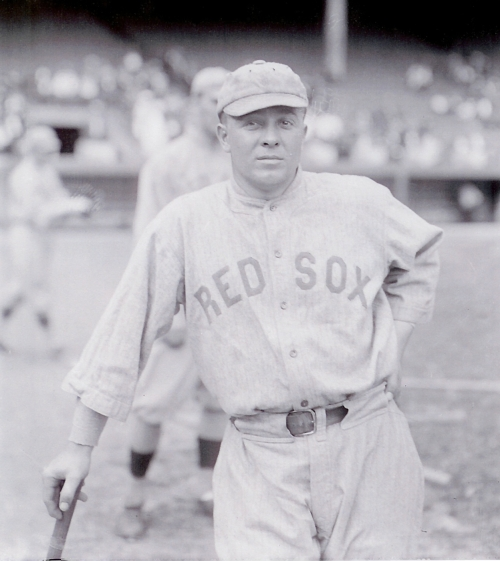
- Outfielder
- Born: April 26, 1888; Kirkerup, Denmark
- Died: October 17, 1962 (aged 74); Norwood, Massachusetts, U.S.
- Batted: Left Threw: Left

MLB debut
- August 11, 1911, for the Boston Red Sox

Last MLB appearance
- June 27, 1917, for the Boston Red Sox

MLB statistics
- Batting average: .269
- Home runs: 1
- Runs batted in: 48
- Stats at Baseball Reference

Teams
- Boston Red Sox (1911–1917)

Career highlights and awards
- 3× World Series champion (1912, 1915, 1916)

Olaf Henriksen (April 26, 1888 – October 17, 1962), nicknamed "Swede", was an American professional baseball outfielder. He is the only Danish-born person ever to play in the major leagues. He played seven seasons (1911–17) for the Boston Red Sox as a teammate of Hall of Famers Babe Ruth and Tris Speaker, among others, and he played a role in three World Series victories, namely in 1912, 1915 and 1916.

Defensively, Olaf Henriksen solely played the outfield. His primary offensive skill was to get on base, and he recorded the second highest on-base percentage in modern baseball history among rookies with more than 100 plate appearances. He never showed much power, though, as he only had one career home run. Henriksen was mainly a bench player for the Red Sox, but he delivered a decisive hit against the famous pitcher Christy Mathewson in Boston's World Series victory in 1912.

In his active baseball career he was 5 ft. 7½ in. tall and weighed 158 lb.

== Life ==
Olaf Henriksen was born in the Danish village Kirkerup on Western Zealand in 1888. Not much is known about the reason for his immigration to the United States. His baseball talents were first discovered by the Boston Americans while he played for their minor league affiliate Brockton in the New England League, and he debuted in the major leagues on August 11, 1911 at the age of 23. Boston lost the game 11-5 to the Philadelphia Athletics.

At the beginning of the 1912 season rumour had it that Olaf Henriksen and his teammate Hugh Bradley were to be traded to the New York Highlanders in exchange for star player Hal Chase. The New York Times described it as "one of the most important trades of recent years", but the deal was never finalized. The public began to take notice of Henriksen, as evidenced by this preseason analysis of Boston's roster:

The outfield will remain about the same for Speaker, Lewis and Hooper are a trio that is hard to beat. Olaf Henricksen,^{[sic]} however, is going to give Lewis a fight for his job. Henricksen, until he was injured, was going at a great clip, and all pitchers looked alike to him.

— Harry Casey, Baseball Magazine, January 1912

His last game was against the Washington Senators on June 27, 1917. Three days later Olaf Henriksen was released from the team and sent back to the minor leagues, but he refused to report. A year later The New York Times reported that the Brooklyn Robins was attempting to sign Henriksen with the intention of letting him reassume his familiar role as a pinch hitter, but the negotiations apparently stalled. After his own professional career ended, Olaf Henriksen became the manager of the baseball team at Boston College. He also managed the semipro team of the Grow Tire Company of Boston

Henriksen's family included his wife Mary and daughter Catherine. On October 17, 1962 Olaf Henriksen died in Norwood, Massachusetts. He is buried in St. Mary Cemetery in the town of Canton, Massachusetts.

== Playing style and role on the team ==
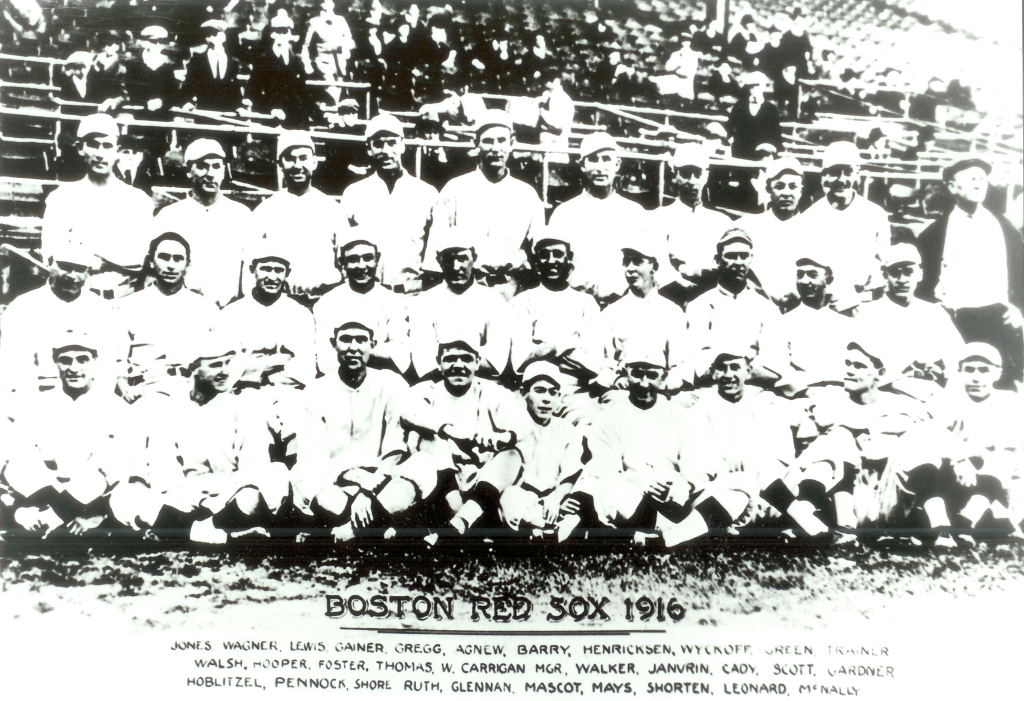
Red Sox team photo taken after their World Series victory in 1916. Olaf Henriksen is the third man from the right in the back row.

Henriksen batted and threw left-handed. A baseball card from 1912, which was produced by a cigar company, calls him the "viking descended outfielder". He is described as a "slashing" hitter who quickly gathered interest from scouts of the Boston Americans. In the Major Leagues he was typically used as a pinch hitter, and as a consequence he only had an average of 1.9 plate appearances per game played over the course of his career. He never became a regular in the lineup but instead he served as a backup for Red Sox' famous outfield trio consisting of Tris Speaker, Harry Hooper and Duffy Lewis. In 1915 he appeared in 73 regular season games and 2 additional games in the playoffs which was his personal record.

Defensively Henriksen exclusively played the outfield. He had most appearances (61) as right fielder, second most (42) as left fielder and finally some (22) as center fielder.

Probably the greatest moment in Olaf Henriksen's professional baseball career occurred when Red Sox manager Jake Stahl decided to use Henriksen as a pinch hitter for Hugh Bedient in the 7th inning of the eighth and final game of the 1912 World Series. Boston was behind by a run and the opposing pitcher was Christy Mathewson, later to become one of the first five players elected into the Hall of Fame. With a late swing Henriksen hit a curveball from Mathewson directly against 3rd base. The ball ricocheted off the base and went far enough into foul territory for the runner on 2nd to score. Henriksen, whom the New York World described as "the confounded son of Thor", ended up with a double. The Red Sox went on to win the game and thereby the World Series.

On March 17, 1916 the Red Sox played an internal spring training match. Babe Ruth launched a long shot which looked like a sure home run, but Olaf Henriksen managed to surprise everybody by literally running through the wooden outfield fence and catching the ball.

Olaf Henriksen is furthermore one of the few players to ever have pinch hit for Babe Ruth. On June 7, 1916, when Ruth had pitched 7 innings versus the Cleveland Indians, Henriksen was substituted into the game and got a base on balls, which ultimately tied the score at 1–1. The Red Sox won the game 2–1.

== Statistics ==
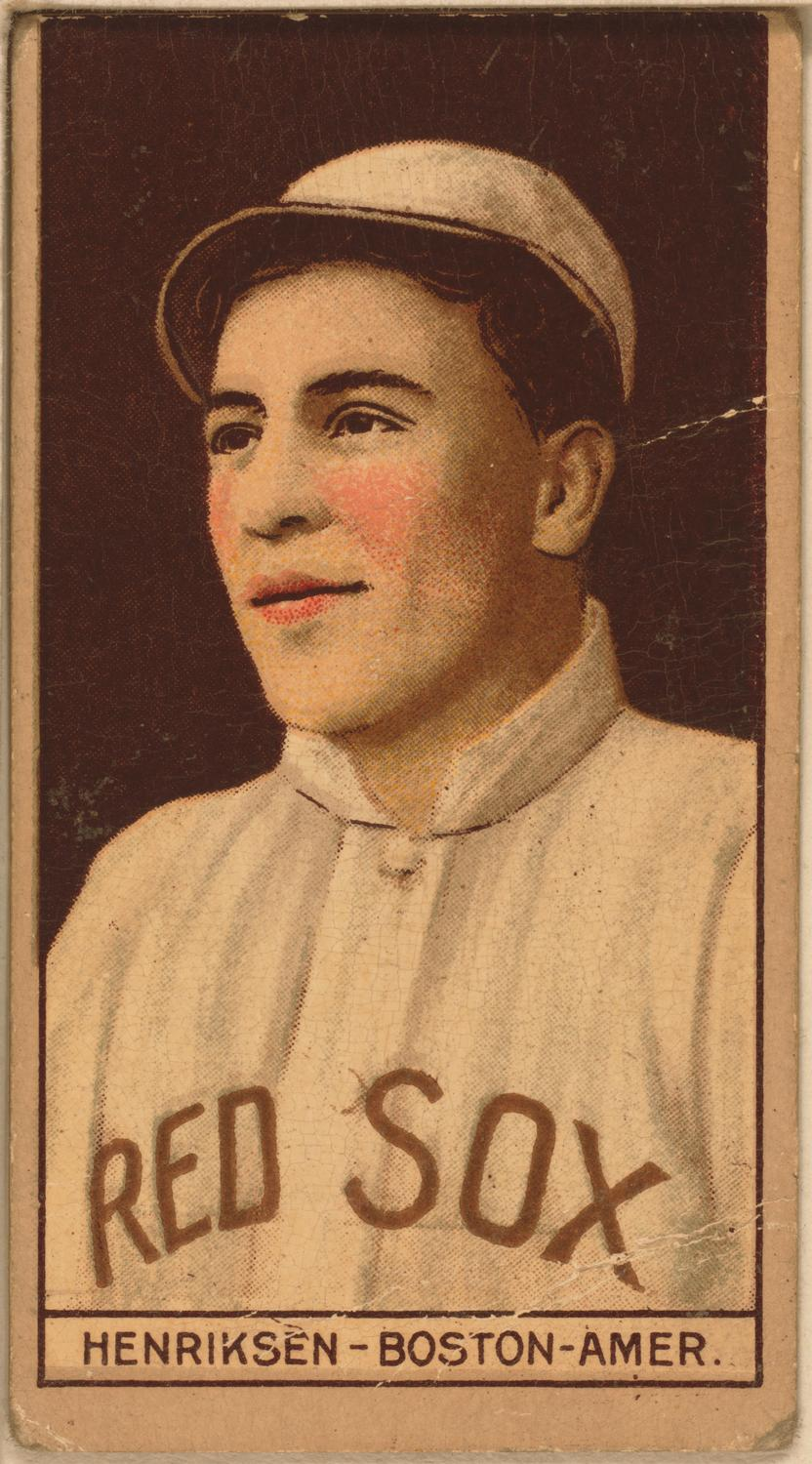
Portrait of Olaf Henriksen from a 1912 baseball card

Henriksen's aggregate batting average, on-base percentage and slugging percentage for his career was .269/.392/.329, respectively. His best season was probably 1913, in which he batted .375/.468/.400 in 31 games, although he played a more significant role on the team the following year when he in 63 games batted .263/.407/.337.

Among rookies with a minimum of 100 plate appearances in their first season in Major League Baseball, Olaf Henriksen registered the second highest on-base percentage since the year 1900 when he in 1911 posted a mark of .449.

Judging from his (even for that era) low slugging percentage, Henriksen was a pretty light-hitting player, and he did only hit 1 career home run, with only 20 of his 131 career hits going for extra bases. In addition, he scored 84 runs and got 48 runs batted in in his career.

Henriksen seems to have had tremendous plate discipline, as evidenced by his 97 career walks versus only 43 recorded strikeouts. However, strikeout data for hitters only dates back to 1913, so in the years with complete statistics his walk/strikeout ratio was 69/43 = 1.6, which is far above the Major League average of that period (approximately 0.8).

He recorded 15 stolen bases versus 9 caught stealing over the course of his career, although the last figure is doubtful due to insufficient data from that age in that particular statistical category.

Of a total of 176 total chances he committed 6 errors and had 8 outfield assists. His career fielding percentage was .966 which is a little higher than the league-average fielding percentage of the time (0.956).

Olaf Henriksen played in five World Series games, with a minimum of one appearance in each of the three Series which Boston participated in (and won) during his tenure on the team. In these games he totalled four plate appearances, of which one resulted in a hit, one in a base on balls and the last two in outs.
