= List of Boston Red Sox in the Baseball Hall of Fame =

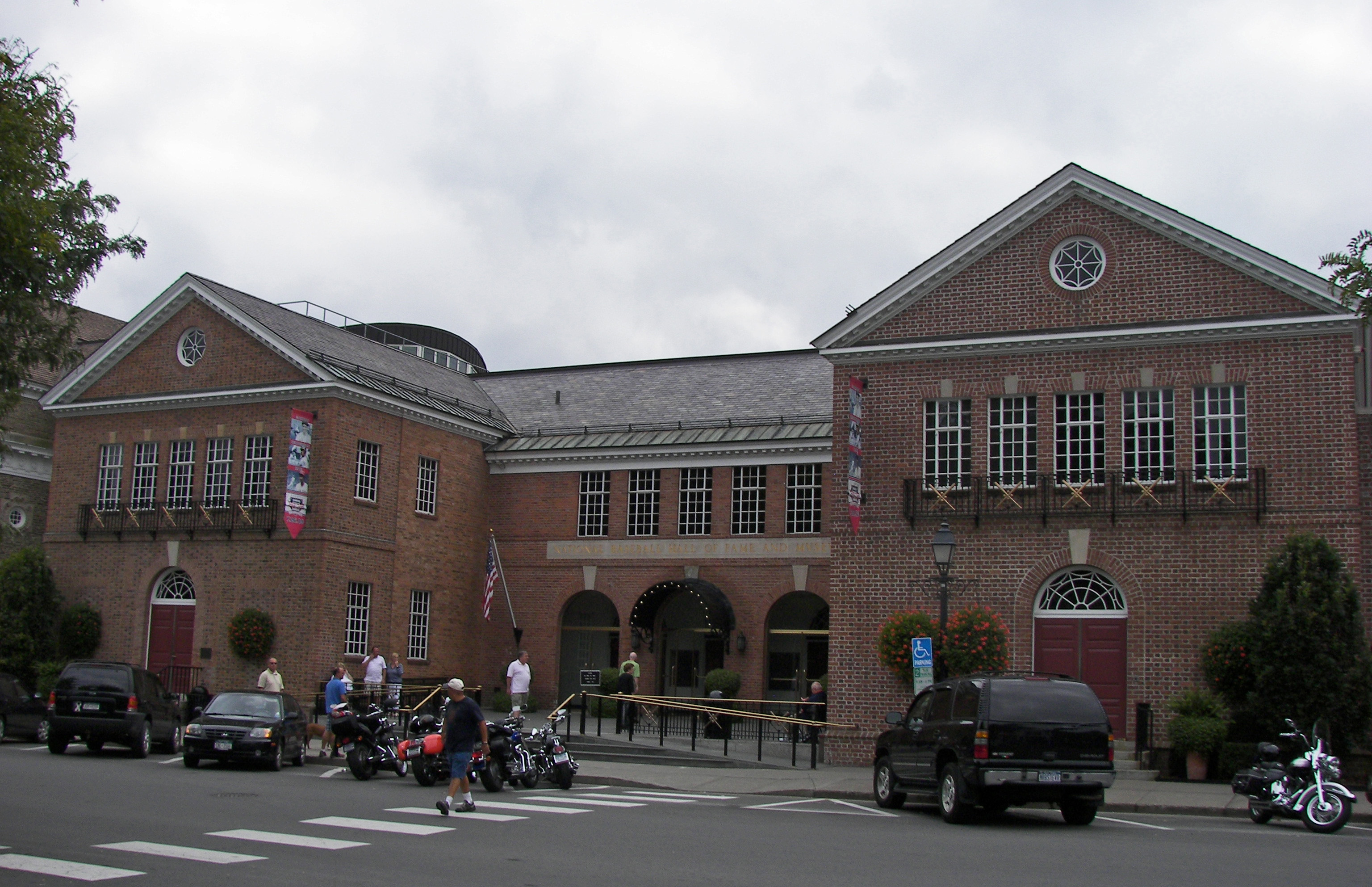
Main building in Cooperstown, as seen in 2009

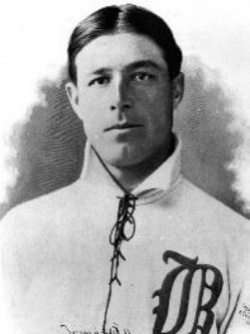
Jimmy Collins, inducted to the Hall of Fame in 1945

This is a list of Boston Red Sox players who have been inducted into the National Baseball Hall of Fame and Museum. The Red Sox are a professional baseball team based in Boston, Massachusetts, and a member of the East division within the American League (AL) of Major League Baseball (MLB). From 1901 through 1907, the team was known as the Boston Americans. Since 1912, the Red Sox have played their home games at Fenway Park.

The National Baseball Hall of Fame and Museum, located at 25 Main Street in Cooperstown, New York, is a museum operated by private interests serving as the central point for the study of the history of baseball in the United States and beyond, the display of baseball-related artifacts and exhibits, and the honoring of persons who have excelled in playing, managing, and serving the sport. The Hall's motto is "Preserving History, Honoring Excellence, Connecting Generations". The expression "Hall of Fame" or the metonym "Cooperstown" are often used to refer to the National Baseball Hall of Fame and Museum.

== Players ==
=== Position players ===
The following position players have the Red Sox listed as their "primary team" or are depicted on their Hall of Fame plaques wearing a Red Sox cap insignia. Those in bold have the Red Sox listed as their "primary team".

Player	Pos.	MLB Years	Red Sox Years	AVG	H	HR	RBI	Year Inducted	Ref.
**Wade Boggs**	3B	1982–1999	1982–1992	.328	3010	118	1014	2005 (1st ballot)	
**Jimmy Collins**	3B	1895–1908	1901–1907	.294	1999	65	983	1945 (Veteran's Committee)	
**Joe Cronin**	SS	1926–1945	1935–1945	.301	2285	170	1424	1956 (10th ballot)	
**Bobby Doerr**	2B	1937–1944, 1946–1951	1937–1944, 1946–1951	.288	2042	223	1247	1986 (Veterans Committee)	
**Rick Ferrell**	C	1929–1945, 1947	1933–1937	.281	1692	28	735	1984 (Veterans Committee)	
Carlton Fisk	C	1969, 1971–1993	1969, 1971–1980	.269	2356	376	1330	2000 (2nd ballot)	
Jimmie Foxx	1B	1925–1942, 1944–1945	1936–1942	.325	2646	534	1922	1951 (7th ballot)	
**Harry Hooper**	RF	1909–1925	1909–1920	.281	2466	75	816	1971 (Veterans Committee)	
**David Ortiz**	DH	1997–2016	2003–2016	.286	2192	541	1768	2022 (1st ballot)	
**Jim Rice**	LF	1974–1989	1974–1989	.298	2452	382	1451	2009 (15th ballot)	
**Ted Williams**	LF	1939–1942, 1946–1960	1939–1942, 1946–1960	.344	2654	521	1839	1966 (1st ballot)	
**Carl Yastrzemski**	LF	1961–1983	1961–1983	.285	3419	452	1844	1989 (1st ballot)	

The following position players were players, managers, or executives for the Red Sox during their careers but are not identified in Cooperstown with the Red Sox as their “primary team” nor with a Red Sox cap insignia.

- Luis Aparicio
- Adrián Beltré
- Lou Boudreau
- Jesse Burkett
- Orlando Cepeda
- Frank Chance
- Eddie Collins
- Andre Dawson
- Hugh Duffy
- Bucky Harris
- Rickey Henderson
- Billy Herman
- George Kell
- Tony LaRussa
- Heinie Manush
- Tony Pérez
- Al Simmons
- Tris Speaker
- Dick Williams

=== Pitchers ===
The following pitchers have the Red Sox listed as their "primary team" or are depicted on their Hall of Fame plaques wearing a Red Sox cap insignia. Those in bold have the Red Sox listed as their "primary team".

Player	MLB Years	Red Sox Years	Wins	Losses	ERA	K	Year Inducted	Ref.
Lefty Grove	1925–1941	1934–1941	300	141	3.06	2266	1947 (3rd ballot)	
**Pedro Martínez**	1992–2009	1998–2004	219	100	2.93	3154	2015 (1st ballot)	
Herb Pennock	1912–1917, 1919–1934	1915–1917, 1919–1922, 1934	240	162	3.60	1227	1948 (8th ballot)	

The following pitchers were players, managers, or executives for the Red Sox during their careers but are not identified in Cooperstown with the Red Sox as their “primary team” nor with a Red Sox cap insignia.

- Jack Chesbro
- Dennis Eckersley
- Waite Hoyt
- Ferguson Jenkins
- Juan Marichal
- Red Ruffing
- Babe Ruth
- Tom Seaver
- Lee Smith
- John Smoltz
- Billy Wagner
- Cy Young

== Non-players ==
The following non-players have the Red Sox listed as their "primary team" or are depicted on their Hall of Fame plaques wearing a Red Sox cap insignia. Those in bold have the Red Sox listed as their "primary team".

Name	Role	Tenure with Red Sox	Year Inducted	Ref.
**Tom Yawkey**	Executive/Owner	1933–1976	1980	

The following non-players were managers or executives for the Red Sox during their careers but are not identified in Cooperstown with the Red Sox as their “primary team” nor with a Red Sox cap insignia.

- Ed Barrow
- Joe McCarthy

== See also ==
- List of members of the Baseball Hall of Fame
