= Golden Outfield =

Trio of Red Sox outfielders

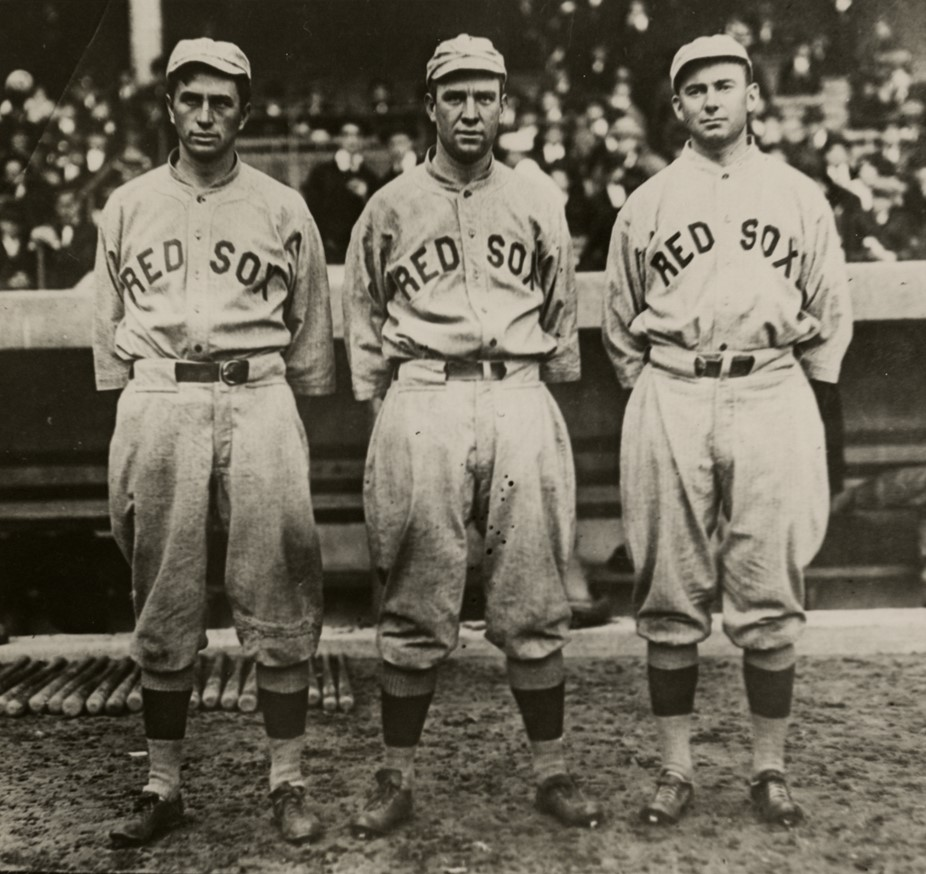
Harry Hooper, Tris Speaker, and Duffy Lewis – Boston's famous "Golden Outfield"

The Golden Outfield, also called the Million Dollar Outfield, were the three starting outfielders of the Boston Red Sox of Major League Baseball from 1910 through 1915, considered one of the greatest outfields of all time. The three members of the Golden Outfield were left fielder Duffy Lewis, center fielder Tris Speaker, and right fielder Harry Hooper. The three helped the Red Sox win two World Series titles, in 1912 and 1915. Two members of the Golden Outfield, Speaker and Hooper, are enshrined in the Baseball Hall of Fame. All three were effective hitters, but were especially known for their fielding skill. Baseball writer Grantland Rice said that they were "the greatest defensive outfield I ever saw...They were smart and fast. They covered every square inch of the park – and they were like three fine infielders on ground balls. They could move into another country, if the ball happened to fall there." Speaker, Hooper, and Lewis all had powerful throwing arms, as well. Both Ty Cobb and Babe Ruth said that it was the best outfield that they had ever seen.

Of the three, Speaker is the all-time Major League leader in double plays by a center fielder with 146. Hooper is the all-time Major League leader in double plays by a right fielder with 86. And Lewis, who had a shorter career, ranks 6th all-time in double plays by a left fielder with 35.

The Golden Outfield was broken up when Speaker was traded to the Cleveland Indians prior to the 1916 season after a salary dispute with Red Sox owner Joseph Lannin.

== Members ==
Speaker was the first to join the Red Sox. He joined the team in 1907 and became a regular in 1910. He starred for the Red Sox in center field until being traded to the Cleveland Indians before the 1916 season. He was the American League Most Valuable Player in 1912, and finished in the top 12 in the MVP voting each season from 1911 through 1914. Speaker was known for playing very shallow in center field, allowing him to participate in 64 double plays in 1053 games as a Red Sox outfielder, and set a career record for outfield assists. He was able to play so shallow because he was outstanding at catching balls hit over his head. Speaker batted .337 for the Red Sox, with 1327 hits in 3935 at bats. He also hit 241 of his all-time record 792 doubles for the Red Sox. During his time with the Red Sox, he led the American League in doubles, home runs, extra base hits, and on-base percentage in 1912, and in hits, doubles, extra base hits, and total bases in 1914. He was one of the first players elected into the Hall of Fame in 1937.

Hooper joined the Red Sox in 1909, after attending Saint Mary's College of California, and became a regular in 1910. Hooper's fielding prowess also forced Major League Baseball to change the rules regarding runners advancing when a fly ball was caught. Hooper used to juggle fly balls as he ran back to the infield, preventing runners from trying to advance until the ball was finally caught. This forced a rule change in which runners could advance as soon as the ball was touched by the fielder, rather than having to wait until the ball was caught. Hooper received MVP votes in both 1913 and 1914. He led the American League in at bats and sacrifice hits in 1910. With the Red Sox from 1909 through 1920, he batted .272 with 1707 hits in 6270 at bats. He was elected to the Hall of Fame in 1971.

Lewis also attended Saint Mary's College of California and joined the Red Sox in 1910, completing the Golden Outfield. Until the 1930s, the Red Sox' home park, Fenway Park, had a slope in front of the left field wall. Lewis was so effective at playing balls off the cliff that it was nicknamed Duffy's Cliff. Lewis played with the Red Sox until 1917 and led the American League in sacrifice hits in 1912. He received MVP votes in 1914, finishing tied with Hooper at 20th overall in the voting. During his time with the Red Sox, he batted .286, with 1248 hits in 4325 at bats. Lewis has not been elected to the Hall of Fame, but did receive votes in several elections from 1937 through 1955. His best showing was in 1955 when he received 34 votes and 13.5% of the total, far below the 75% needed for election.

Speaker, Hooper, and Lewis made their first start as a trio on April 27, 1910, in an 11–1 road win over the Washington Senators.

== World Series play ==
In the 1912 World Series, Speaker batted .300, Hooper batted .290, and Lewis batted .188. All had three extra base hits in the series. In addition, Hooper made a famous bare-handed catch to rob the New York Giants' Larry Doyle of a home run to preserve a Red Sox victory in game 7 of the series.

In the 1915 World Series, all members of the trio had solid hitting performances, with Lewis batting .444, Hooper .350, and Speaker .294. In addition Speaker made a spectacular catch to rob Dode Paskert of an extra base hit that would have won game 2 for the Philadelphia Phillies. After the series, which the Red Sox won in five games, sportswriter George R. Holmes proclaimed that the Golden Outfield was the greatest outfield of all time. In October 1965, Baseball Digest wrote that the 1915 Boston performance was the greatest by an outfield in World Series history. It would be the last time that all three men played on the same team, as Speaker was traded to Cleveland before the 1916 season.

== Rivalry ==
During the 1910s, the Red Sox were beset by a religious rivalry, and members of the Golden Outfield were not immune to this. Lewis and catcher Bill Carrigan were leaders of the Catholic faction, while Speaker, pitcher Smokey Joe Wood, and third baseman Larry Gardner were leaders of the Protestant faction. Speaker and Lewis, in particular, did not get along. One day in 1913, Speaker annoyed Lewis by repeatedly knocking Lewis' cap off. Lewis said, "Do that again and I'll kill you." After Speaker continued to do it, Lewis hit him in the shins with a baseball bat, and Speaker had to be helped off the field. According to a Red Sox clubhouse insider, there was one full season where Speaker did not speak to Lewis or Hooper "because they were Catholics and he wasn't...They used to hate each other. Hate each other!"
