= 1915 World Series =

1915 Major League Baseball championship series

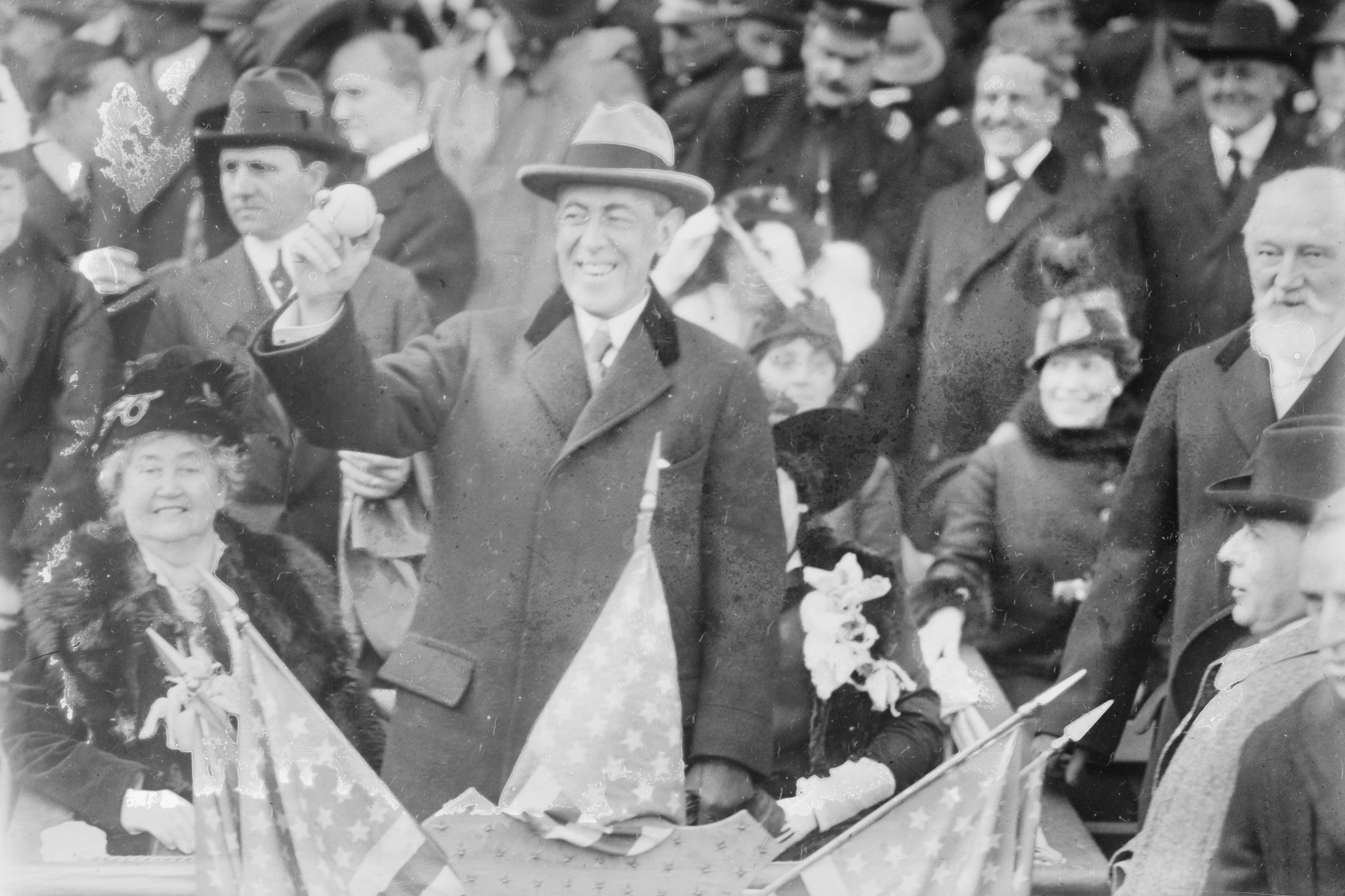
- U.S. President Woodrow Wilson throws out the ceremonial first pitch, first for a president in a World Series.
Team (Wins)	Managers	Season
Boston Red Sox (4)	Bill Carrigan	101–50, .669, GA: 2 1/2
Philadelphia Phillies (1)	Pat Moran	90–62, .592, GA: 7
- Dates: October 8–13
- Venue(s): National League Park (Philadelphia); Braves Field (Boston)
- Umpires: Bill Klem (NL), Silk O'Loughlin (AL); Cy Rigler (NL), Billy Evans (AL)
- Hall of Famers: Umpires: Bill Klem; Billy Evans; Red Sox: Harry Hooper; Herb Pennock (DNP); Babe Ruth; Tris Speaker; Phillies: Grover Cleveland Alexander; Dave Bancroft; Eppa Rixey

World Series program
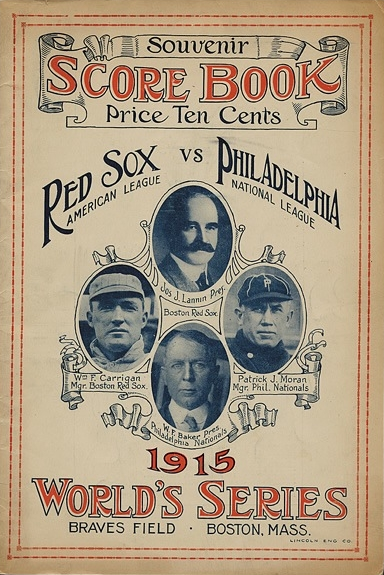

The 1915 World Series was the championship series in Major League Baseball for the 1915 season. The 12th edition of the World Series, it matched the American League (AL) champion Boston Red Sox against the National League (NL) champion Philadelphia Phillies. The Red Sox won the Series four games to one. It was the last World Series to start on a Friday until the 2022 World Series.

In their only World Series before 1950, the Phillies won Game 1 before being swept the rest of the way. It was 65 years before the Phillies won their next Series game. The Red Sox pitching was so strong in the 1915 series that the young Babe Ruth was not used on the mound and only made a single pinch-hitting appearance.

== Series arrangements ==
Arrangements for the Series were made on October 2, 1915, in a meeting of the team owners, league presidents and the National Commission at the Waldorf-Astoria Hotel in midtown Manhattan, New York City. Red Sox owner Joseph Lannin lost the coin toss for home field advantage, and Phillies owner William F. Baker chose to have the first two games of the Series in Philadelphia. The league presidents selected the umpires, and it was announced that J. G. Taylor Spink would be one of the official scorers.

One controversy surrounded the allocation of tickets to the Red Sox' Royal Rooters fan club. Each visiting team was allocated 200 tickets, but the Red Sox requested an additional 400 on behalf of their supporters. The Phillies' National League Park sat only 20,000, and their above-cited owner, William Baker, refused to allocate additional tickets for visiting fans. The matter was resolved by National Commission chairman Garry Herrmann, who gave the Red Sox tickets from the Commission's own Series allocation.

== Series summary ==
The Phillies won Game 1 3–1, although The New York Times reporter Hugh Fullerton wrote of the future 300+ game-winning Hall of Famer, "[Grover Cleveland] Alexander pitched a bad game of ball. He had little or nothing" in his review of the game, headed "Nothing but luck saved the Phillies." The Times also reported that a crowd of 10,000 gathered in Manhattan's Times Square to view a real-time mechanical recreation of the game on a giant scoreboard sponsored by the newspaper.

The Phillies would not win another postseason game until 1977, nor another World Series game until 1980. The Red Sox swept Games 2–5, all by one run, and by identical scores of 2–1 in Games 2–4.

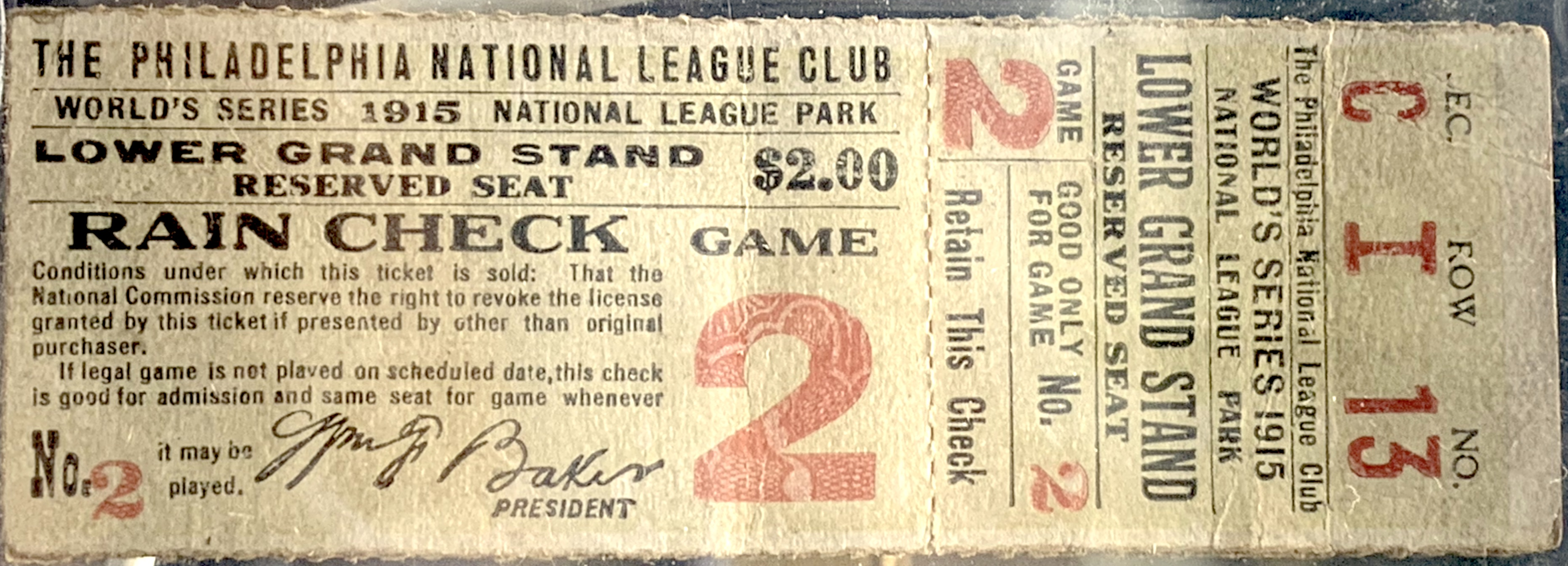
Ticket for 1915 World's Series Game 2 held October 9, 1915 at Philadelphia's National League Park

In Game 2, Woodrow Wilson became the first U.S. President to attend a World Series game, and first to throw out the ceremonial first pitch.

This was the second straight year that a Boston team beat a Philadelphia team in the World Series after the Braves had swept the Athletics the year before.

Unlike the 1913 Series, where the home team won only one of the five games, home field was often very much an advantage in the 1915 October classic. Fenway Park, ironically the Braves' home field in their 1914 Series sweep of the A's while Braves Field was still being built, had been the home of the Red Sox for four seasons and was fully functional in 1915; yet the Red Sox played their 1915 Series "home" games in the brand-new Braves Field to take advantage of its larger seating capacity. Beyond the added revenue, the long ball was affected by this arrangement, as follows:

- In the top of the third inning of Game 3 at Boston, with two out, one run in and two runners in scoring position, Phillies' slugger "Cactus" Gavvy Cravath hit a line drive to deep left field which was caught for a harmless inning-ending out in the spacious Braves Field outfield. In Fenway or Philadelphia's National League Park, it might have been a home run or at least an extra-base hit which might have turned the Series around.
- The Phillies had packed some extra outfield seats into their already-small bandbox of a ball-field, shortening the distance from home to the outfield wall even more. This proved crucial in the decisive Game 5, in which Boston's Harry Hooper twice homered over the moved-in center field fence and Duffy Lewis followed suit. In Braves Field, those would have been extra-base hits at best. Both of Hooper's hits, including the eventual game-winner in the top of the ninth, actually bounced over the fence and were home runs by the rules of that era, although they would have been only ground-rule doubles by present-day rules.

The Series also became the first postseason series where neither team led by more than two runs at any point during any of the games. This feat wouldn't be matched until the 2026 National League Division Series between the Milwaukee Brewers and the San Diego Padres.

== Summary ==
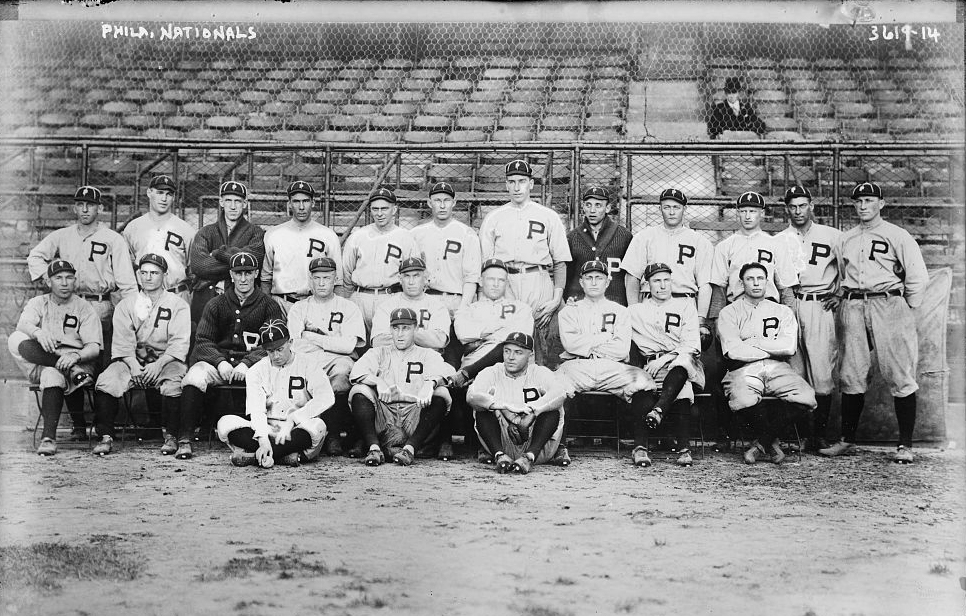
Philadelphia team photo taken on October 4, 1915.

AL Boston Red Sox (4) vs. NL Philadelphia Phillies (1)

Game	Date	Score	Location	Time	Attendance
1	October 8	Boston Red Sox – 1, Philadelphia Phillies – 3	National League Park	1:58	19,343
2	October 9	Boston Red Sox – 2, Philadelphia Phillies – 1	National League Park	2:05	20,306
3	October 11	Philadelphia Phillies – 1, Boston Red Sox – 2	Braves Field	1:48	42,300
4	October 12	Philadelphia Phillies – 1, Boston Red Sox – 2	Braves Field	2:05	41,096
5	October 13	Boston Red Sox – 5, Philadelphia Phillies – 4	National League Park	2:15	20,306

== Matchups ==
=== Game 1 ===
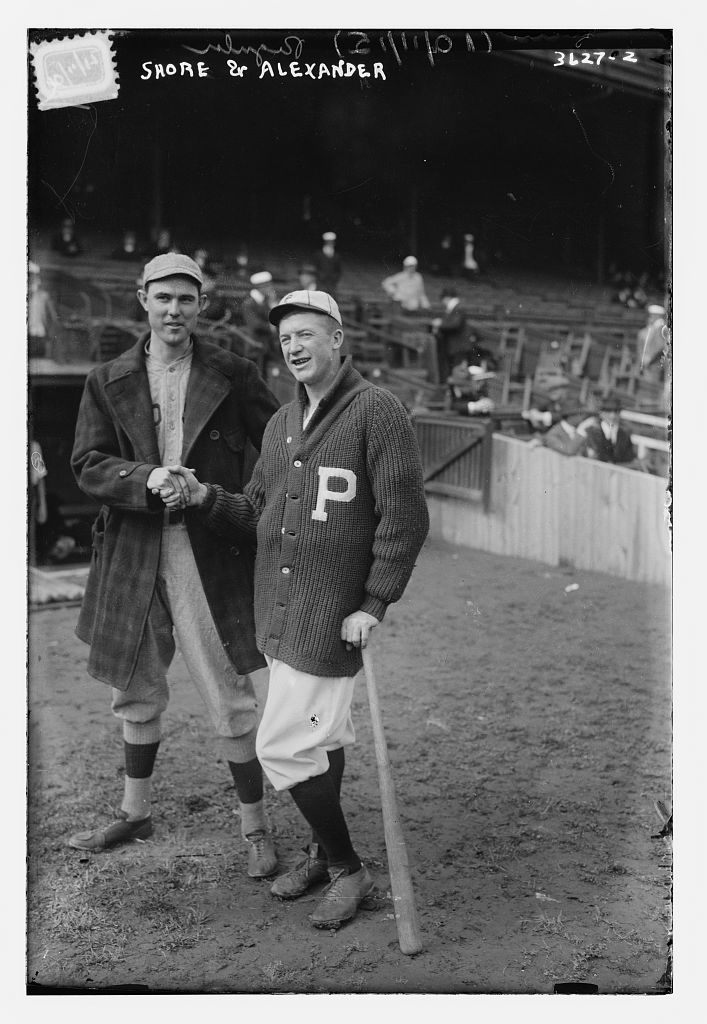
Game 1 starting pitchers Ernie Shore (left) and Grover Cleveland Alexander (right).

Friday, October 8, 1915 2:00 pm (ET) at National League Park in Philadelphia, Pennsylvania
Team	1	2	3	4	5	6	7	8	9	R	H	E
Boston	0	0	0	0	0	0	0	1	0	1	8	1
Philadelphia	0	0	0	1	0	0	0	2	X	3	5	1
WP: Grover Cleveland Alexander (1–0) LP: Ernie Shore (0–1)

Alexander scattered eight hits, winning 3–1, in giving the Phillies their only win of the series and their last until Game 1 of the 1980 Series.

=== Game 2 ===
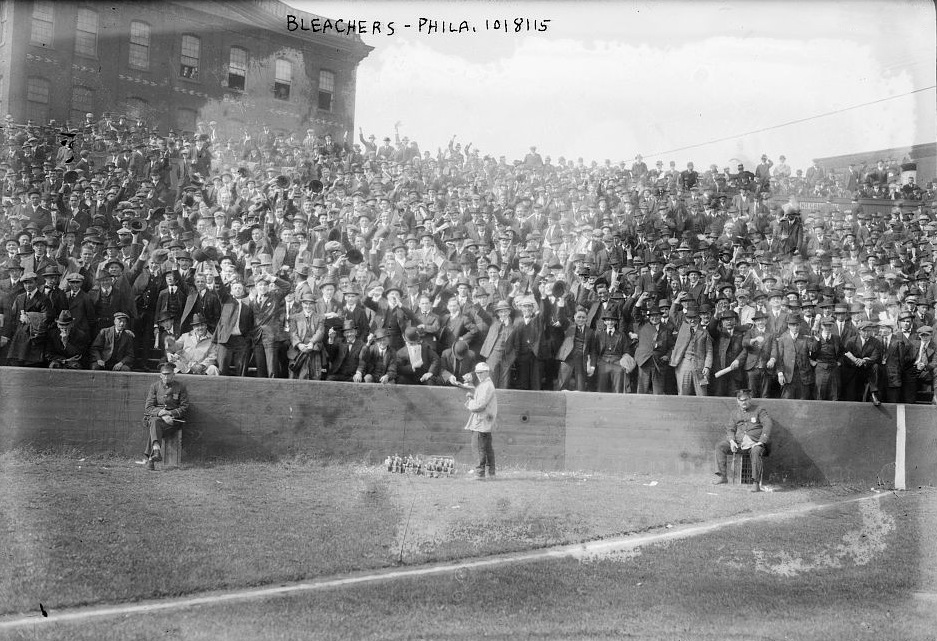
National League Park bleachers in 1915

Saturday, October 9, 1915 2:00 pm (ET) at National League Park in Philadelphia, Pennsylvania
Team	1	2	3	4	5	6	7	8	9	R	H	E
Boston	1	0	0	0	0	0	0	0	1	2	10	0
Philadelphia	0	0	0	0	1	0	0	0	0	1	3	1
WP: Rube Foster (1–0) LP: Erskine Mayer (0–1)

Rube Foster pitched a 3-hitter, allowing no walks, and retiring the last 10 Phillies he faced, and helped his own cause with the game-winning RBI single in the top of the ninth.

=== Game 3 ===
Monday, October 11, 1915 2:00 pm (ET) at Braves Field in Boston, Massachusetts
Team	1	2	3	4	5	6	7	8	9	R	H	E
Philadelphia	0	0	1	0	0	0	0	0	0	1	3	0
Boston	0	0	0	1	0	0	0	0	1	2	6	1
WP: Dutch Leonard (1–0) LP: Grover Cleveland Alexander (1–1)

The third game matched Dutch Leonard for the Red Sox and Grover Cleveland Alexander for the Phillies in what became a classic pitcher's duel, with Leonard retiring the last 20 Phillies to face him. The Phillies struck first on a Dave Bancroft RBI single in the third inning before the Sox responded in the 4th with a sacrifice fly by Dick Hoblitzell after Tris Speaker had lined a triple.

In the 9th, Harry Hooper delivered a leadoff single for the Red Sox before being advanced to second on a bunt groundout by Everett Scott. Speaker was intentionally walked to bring up Hoblitzell, who grounded out but got Hooper to third base. With two out, Duffy Lewis delivered a hit to center that saw Hooper score to give the Sox the win.

=== Game 4 ===
Tuesday, October 12, 1915 2:00 pm (ET) at Braves Field in Boston, Massachusetts
Team	1	2	3	4	5	6	7	8	9	R	H	E
Philadelphia	0	0	0	0	0	0	0	1	0	1	7	0
Boston	0	0	1	0	0	1	0	0	X	2	8	1
WP: Ernie Shore (1–1) LP: George Chalmers (0–1)

Ernie Shore held the Phillies scoreless until the eighth inning, winning 2–1, giving the Red Sox a 3–1 series lead.

=== Game 5 ===
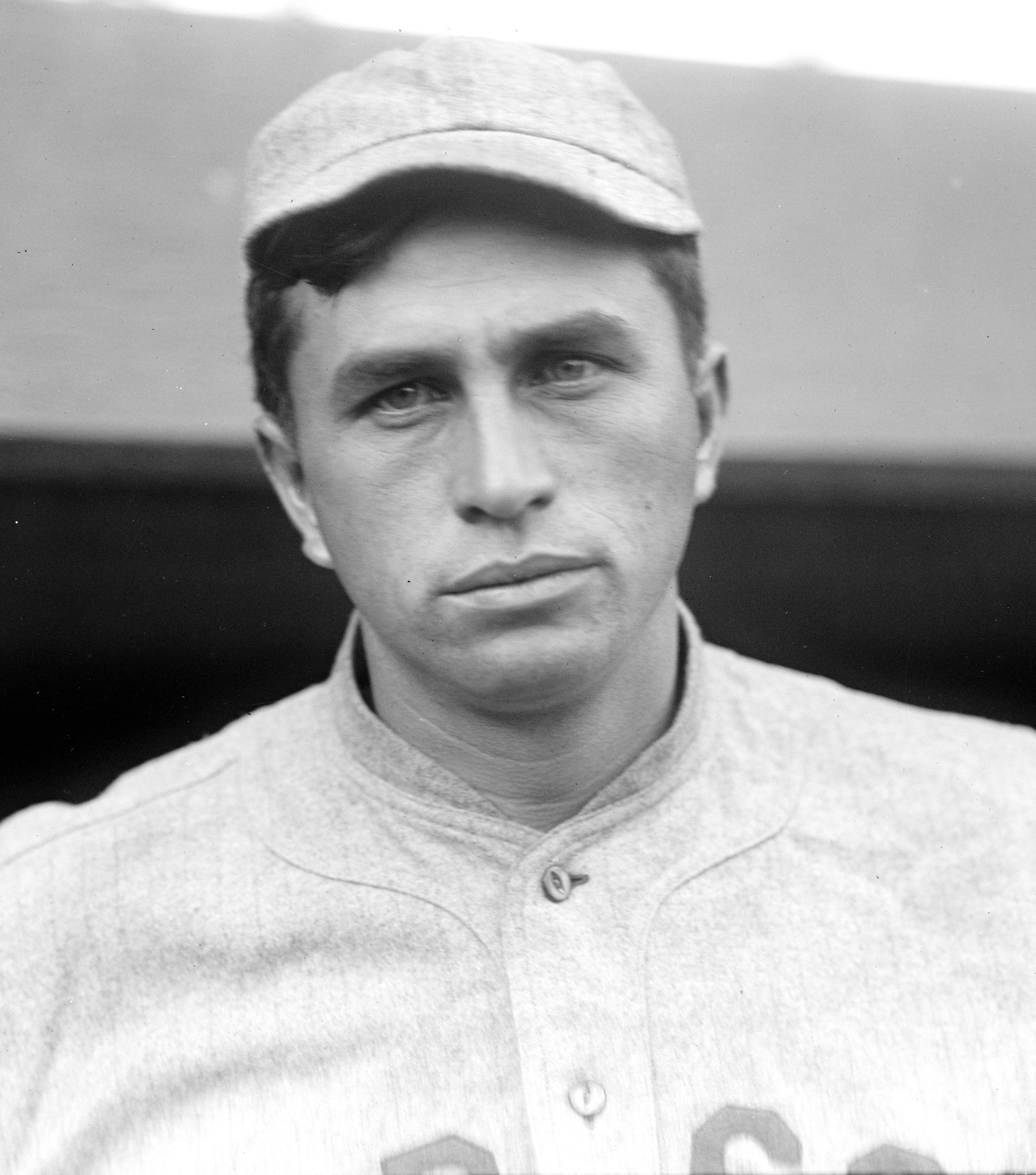
Harry Hooper hit two home runs in game five

Wednesday, October 13, 1915 2:00 pm (ET) at National League Park in Philadelphia, Pennsylvania
Team	1	2	3	4	5	6	7	8	9	R	H	E
Boston	0	1	1	0	0	0	0	2	1	5	10	1
Philadelphia	2	0	0	2	0	0	0	0	0	4	9	1
WP: Rube Foster (2–0) LP: Eppa Rixey (0–1); Home runs: BOS: Harry Hooper 2 (2), Duffy Lewis (1); PHI: Fred Luderus (1)

The Red Sox won on three home runs by two of their outfielders, two cheapies by Harry Hooper (see above) and one by Duffy Lewis. Fred Luderus homered for the Phillies only home run of the series in the bottom of the fourth inning. Those were the only round-trippers in the entire Series, the first four games being pitchers' duels. The Phillies were held to a weak .182 team batting average in the 5-game set.

== Composite Line Score ==
1915 World Series (4–1): Boston Red Sox (A.L.) over Philadelphia Phillies (N.L.)

Team	1	2	3	4	5	6	7	8	9	R	H	E
Boston Red Sox	1	1	2	1	0	1	0	3	3	12	42	4
Philadelphia Phillies	2	0	1	3	1	0	0	3	0	10	27	3
Total attendance: 143,351 Average attendance: 28,670; Winning player's share: $3,780 Losing player's share: $2,520

== Series Statistics ==
=== Boston Red Sox ===
==== Batting ====
Note: GP=Games played; AB=At bats; R=Runs; H=Hits; 2B=Doubles; 3B=Triples; HR=Home runs; RBI=Runs batted in; BB=Walks; AVG=Batting average; OBP=On base percentage; SLG=Slugging percentage

Player	GP	AB	R	H	2B	3B	HR	RBI	BB	AVG	OBP	SLG	Reference
Hick Cady	4	6	0	2	0	0	0	0	1	.333	.429	.333	
Dick Hoblitzell	5	16	1	5	0	0	0	1	0	.313	.313	.313	
Jack Barry	5	17	1	3	0	0	0	1	1	.176	.222	.176	
Larry Gardner	5	17	2	4	0	1	0	0	1	.235	.278	.353	
Everett Scott	5	18	0	1	0	0	0	0	0	.056	.056	.056	
Duffy Lewis	5	18	1	8	1	0	1	5	1	.444	.474	.667	
Tris Speaker	5	17	2	5	0	1	0	0	4	.294	.429	.412	
Harry Hooper	5	20	4	7	0	0	2	3	2	.350	.435	.650	
Pinch Thomas	2	5	0	1	0	0	0	0	0	.200	.200	.200	
Del Gainer	1	3	1	1	0	0	0	0	0	.333	.333	.333	
Bill Carrigan	1	2	0	0	0	0	0	0	1	.000	.333	.000	
Olaf Henriksen	2	2	0	0	0	0	0	0	0	.000	.000	.000	
Babe Ruth	1	1	0	0	0	0	0	0	0	.000	.000	.000	
Hal Janvrin	1	1	0	0	0	0	0	0	0	.000	.000	.000	
Rube Foster	2	8	0	4	1	0	0	1	0	.500	.500	.625	
Ernie Shore	2	5	0	1	0	0	0	0	0	.200	.200	.200	
Dutch Leonard	1	3	0	0	0	0	0	0	0	.000	.000	.000	

==== Pitching ====
Note: G=Games Played; GS=Games Started; IP=Innings Pitched; H=Hits; BB=Walks; R=Runs; ER=Earned Runs; SO=Strikeouts; W=Wins; L=Losses; SV=Saves; ERA=Earned Run Average

Player	G	GS	IP	H	BB	R	ER	SO	W	L	SV	ERA	Reference
Rube Foster	2	2	18	12	2	5	4	13	2	0	0	2.00	
Ernie Shore	2	2	17	12	0	4	4	6	1	1	0	2.12	
Dutch Leonard	1	1	9	3	0	1	1	6	1	0	0	1.00	

=== Philadelphia Phillies ===
==== Batting ====
Note: GP=Games played; AB=At bats; R=Runs; H=Hits; 2B=Doubles; 3B=Triples; HR=Home runs; RBI=Runs batted in; BB=Walks; AVG=Batting average; OBP=On base percentage; SLG=Slugging percentage

Player	GP	AB	R	H	2B	3B	HR	RBI	BB	AVG	OBP	SLG	Reference
Ed Burns	5	16	1	3	0	0	0	0	1	.188	.235	.188	
Fred Luderus	5	16	1	7	2	0	1	6	1	.438	.500	.750	
Bert Niehoff	5	16	1	1	0	0	0	0	1	.063	.118	.063	
Milt Stock	5	17	1	2	1	0	0	0	1	.118	.211	.176	
Dave Bancroft	5	17	2	5	0	0	0	1	2	.294	.368	.294	
Possum Whitted	5	15	0	1	0	0	0	1	1	.067	.125	.067	
Dode Paskert	5	19	2	3	0	0	0	0	1	.158	.200	.158	
Gavvy Cravath	5	16	2	2	1	1	0	1	2	.125	.222	.313	
Bobby Byrne	1	1	0	0	0	0	0	0	0	.000	.000	.000	
Bill Killefer	1	1	0	0	0	0	0	0	0	.000	.000	.000	
Oscar Dugey	2	0	0	0	0	0	0	0	0	─	─	─	
Beals Becker	2	0	0	0	0	0	0	0	0	─	─	─	
Grover Cleveland Alexander	2	5	0	1	0	0	0	0	0	.200	.200	.200	
Erskine Mayer	2	4	0	0	0	0	0	0	0	.000	.000	.000	
George Chalmers	1	3	0	1	0	0	0	0	0	.333	.333	.333	
Eppa Rixey	1	2	0	1	0	0	0	0	0	.500	.500	.500	

==== Pitching ====
Note: G=Games Played; GS=Games Started; IP=Innings Pitched; H=Hits; BB=Walks; R=Runs; ER=Earned Runs; SO=Strikeouts; W=Wins; L=Losses; SV=Saves; ERA=Earned Run Average

Player	G	GS	IP	H	BB	R	ER	SO	W	L	SV	ERA	Reference
Grover Cleveland Alexander	2	2	17 2/3	14	4	3	3	10	1	1	0	1.53	
Erskine Mayer	2	2	11 1/3	16	2	4	3	7	0	1	0	2.38	
George Chalmers	1	1	8	8	3	2	2	6	0	1	0	2.25	
Eppa Rixey	1	0	6 2/3	4	2	3	3	2	0	1	0	4.05	

== Aftermath ==
The Phillies would have to wait until 1950 for another chance at the championship, but were swept by the New York Yankees, becoming the second victim of a Yankees dynasty of five straight championships from 1949 to 1953. This was the last time the Phillies won a game in the World Series until their 1980 championship season.

The Red Sox would return to the World Series the next year, where they defeated the Brooklyn Dodgers in five games to repeat as champions.
