= Kirkerup =

- Village
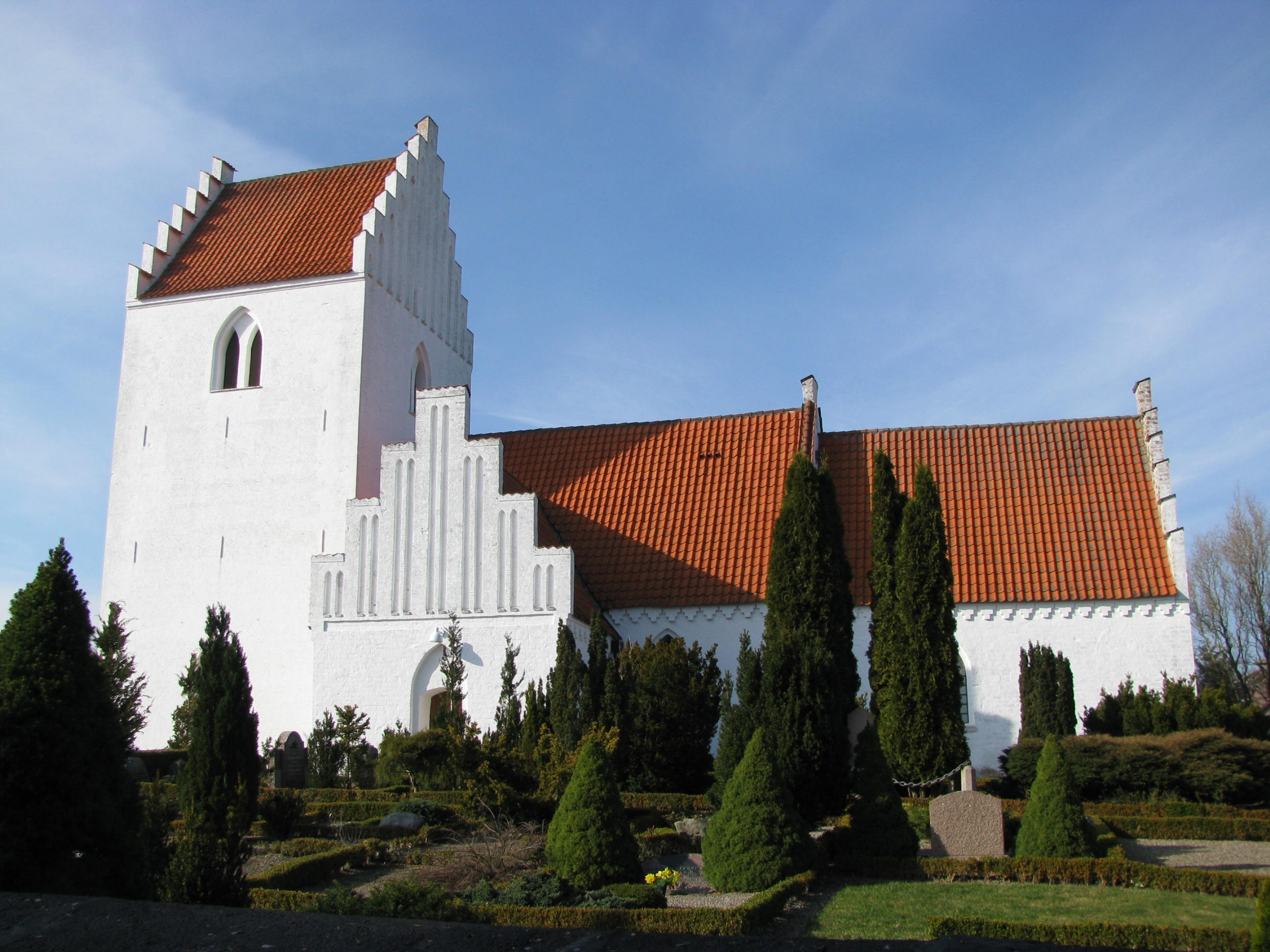
- Kirkerup Church

- Location in Denmark Kirkerup (Denmark Region Zealand)
- Coordinates: 55°21′37″N 11°29′29″E
- Country: Denmark
- Region: Region Zealand
- Municipality: Slagelse
- Time zone: UTC+1 (CET)
  - Summer (DST): UTC+2 (CEST)
- Postal code: 4200

Kirkerup is a village in Slagelse Municipality in the Zealand Region of Denmark. Kirkerup parish has a population of 344 people and is situated on the western part of the island of Zealand. The village is the main village in the parish of Kirkerup Sogn where the manor house Gyldenholm is located. The village lies three km from the town of Sørbymagle and 10 km from the main town of the municipality, Slagelse. In 2023, the town was the crime scene of a child abduction.

== History ==
Kirkerup has a long history dating back to the Middle Ages. The village was first mentioned in written records in the year 1177 under the name "Kyricorp". It is believed that the name "Kirkerup" comes from the words "Kirke" meaning "church" and "rup" meaning "village" in Old Danish.

In the 19th century, the village experienced a period of growth due to the construction of the Great Belt Railway, which passed through Kirkerup. The railway provided new opportunities for trade and commerce and brought new residents to the village.

== Landmarks ==
The most important landmark in the town is Kirkerup Church. Kirkerup Church Barn (Kirkerup Kirkelade) was listed on the Danish register of protected buildings and places in 1964. The building dates from the 1450s.

== Notable people ==
Danish rower Harry Julius Larsen (1915) was from Kirkerup, as was Olaf Henriksen, the only Major League Baseball player from Denmark.
