= George Chalmers (baseball) =

American baseball player (1888–1960)

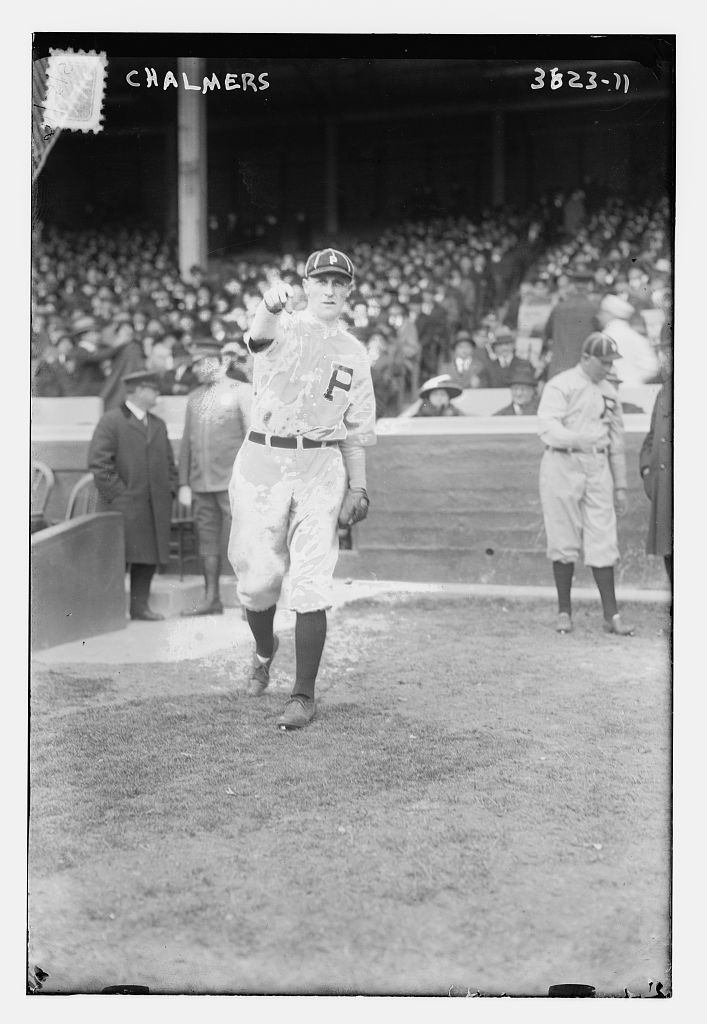
- Pitcher
- Born: June 7, 1888; Aberdeen, Scotland
- Died: August 5, 1960 (aged 72); The Bronx, New York, US
- Batted: Right Threw: Right

MLB debut
- September 21, 1910, for the Philadelphia Phillies

Last MLB appearance
- August 7, 1916, for the Philadelphia Phillies

MLB statistics
- Earned run average: 3.41
- Strikeouts: 290
- Win–loss record: 29–41
- Stats at Baseball Reference

Teams
- Philadelphia Phillies (1910–1916)

George W. Chalmers (June 7, 1888 – August 5, 1960) was an American professional baseball player who was a pitcher in the major leagues from 1910 to 1916. He played for the Philadelphia Phillies. On October 12, 1915, he became the first European born pitcher to start a World Series game.

In April 2018, the Aberdeen Baseball Club began work on their new home field which they named in Chalmers' honour: George W. Chalmers Field.
