= Duffy Lewis =

American baseball player (1888–1979)

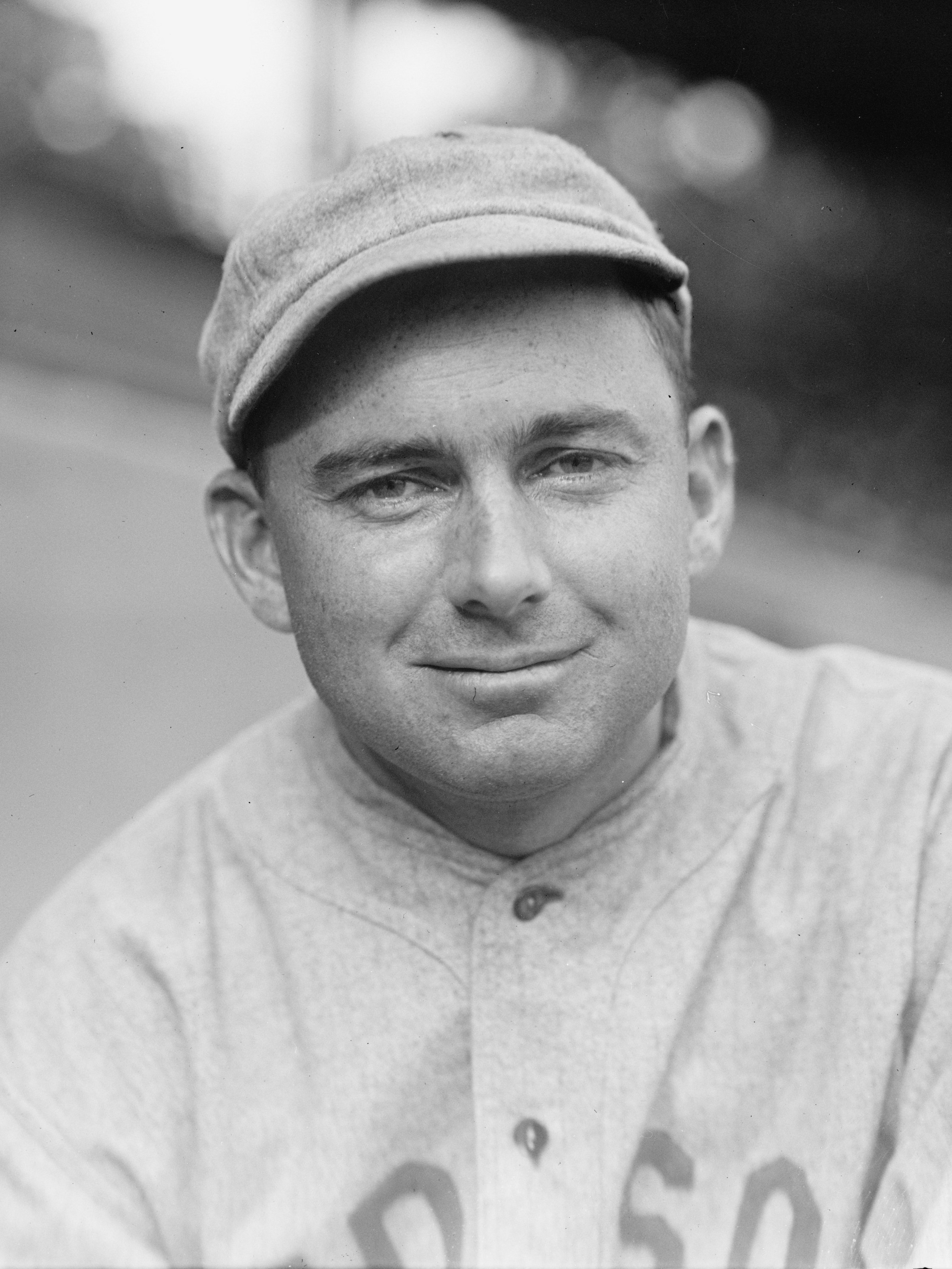
- Lewis in 1915
- Left fielder
- Born: April 18, 1888; San Francisco, California, U.S.
- Died: June 17, 1979 (aged 91); Salem, New Hampshire, U.S.
- Batted: Right Threw: Right

MLB debut
- April 16, 1910, for the Boston Red Sox

Last MLB appearance
- June 6, 1921, for the Washington Senators

MLB statistics
- Batting average: .284
- Home runs: 38
- Runs batted in: 791
- Stats at Baseball Reference

Teams
- Boston Red Sox (1910–1917); New York Yankees (1919–1920); Washington Senators (1921)

Career highlights and awards
- 3× World Series champion (1912, 1915, 1916); Boston Red Sox Hall of Fame

George Edward "Duffy" Lewis (April 18, 1888 – June 17, 1979) was an American professional baseball player who was a left fielder in Major League Baseball (MLB) for the Boston Red Sox, the New York Yankees, and the Washington Senators from 1910 to 1921.

Lewis attended Saint Mary's College of California. He made his MLB debut with the Red Sox in 1910, where he formed the Golden Outfield with Tris Speaker and Harry Hooper. He won three World Series championships with Boston (1912, 1915, and 1916). The Red Sox traded Lewis to the Yankees, where he played in 1919 and 1920, before they traded him to the Senators before the 1921 season. He continued to play and manage in the minor leagues until 1929.

Lewis continued to work in baseball as a coach for the Boston Braves from 1931 to 1935, and then as their traveling secretary through 1961. Lewis is a member of the Boston Red Sox Hall of Fame and the Pacific Coast League Hall of Fame.

== Early life ==
George Edward Lewis was born to Mary (née Duffy) and George Lewis on April 18, 1888, in San Francisco, California. He acquired his nickname from his mother's maiden name. He had an older brother and an older sister. When Lewis was seven years old, he served as the mascot for the local baseball team in Alameda, California.

== Playing career ==
=== Early career ===
Lewis attended Saint Mary's College of California before making his professional baseball debut with the Alameda Grays of the California State League in 1907. He played for the Oakland Oaks of the Pacific Coast League (PCL) in 1908 and 1909. He also played winter baseball in Yuma, Arizona, where he was first noticed by Boston Red Sox owner John I. Taylor. In September 1909, the Red Sox selected Lewis from Oakland in the Rule 5 draft. He finished the 1909 season with Oakland, and reported to spring training with the Red Sox in 1910.

=== Boston Red Sox ===
Lewis became the Red Sox starting left fielder in 1910. Harry Hooper, who had played left field for the Red Sox, became the right fielder. Along with Hooper and center fielder Tris Speaker, Lewis played in the Golden Outfield from 1910 to 1915. In his rookie season, Lewis batted .283 with eight home runs, second-most in the American League, and 29 doubles, third-most in the league. In 1911, he batted .307 with seven home runs, In 1912, he batted .284 with six home runs. His 109 runs batted in (RBIs) were the second-most in the league. The Red Sox won the American League championship, and defeated the New York Giants in the 1912 World Series in eight games. Lewis batted .188 (6-for-32) in the series.

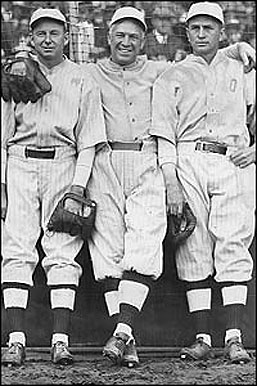
Lewis (left), Tris Speaker (center), and Harry Hooper (right): Boston's Golden Outfield

In 1913, Lewis batted .298 with no home runs. Babe Ruth made his major league debut on July 11, 1914, and Lewis pinch hit for Ruth during the game. He was the only player to pinch hit for Ruth during the latter's major league career. Lewis finished the 1914 season with a .278 batting average. In 1915, Lewis batted .291 with 31 doubles, which was the second-most in the league. The Red Sox faced the Philadelphia Phillies in the 1915 World Series, and won in five games. Lewis batted .444 (8-for-18) against the Phillies. He also recorded five out of the 12 RBIs in the series for Boston. He drove in the game-winning runs in both Games 3 and 4, and made several catches that helped Boston win the series. After the World Series, Lewis returned to the San Francisco Bay Area, where he performed vaudeville shows at the Pantanges Theatre in Oakland for $500 a week ($15,913 in current dollar terms).

The Red Sox traded Speaker to the Cleveland Indians in 1916, and Boston manager Bill Carrigan experimented with playing Lewis in center field before returning him to left field. The Red Sox repeated as American League champions in 1916, with Lewis batting .268. In the 1916 World Series, the Red Sox defeated the Brooklyn Robins in five games; Lewis batted .353 (6-for-17). Lewis batted .302 for the Red Sox in 1917; it was the ninth-highest batting average in the league that season.

=== Later playing career ===
Lewis did not play for the Red Sox during the 1918 season due to his service in the United States Navy during World War I. He enlisted as a yeoman and was stationed at the Mare Island Naval Shipyard, where he was the player-manager for the shipyard's baseball team. He became a chief petty officer before the end of his service.

On December 18, 1918, the Red Sox traded Lewis, along with Dutch Leonard and Ernie Shore, to the New York Yankees for Ray Caldwell, Frank Gilhooley, Slim Love, Roxy Walters and $15,000 ($321,073 in current dollar terms). He batted .272 with seven home runs for the Yankees in 1919, while leading the American League with 141 games played. He began to lose playing time in 1920 following the major league debut of Bob Meusel and the acquisition of Ruth from Boston, but Lewis still batted .271 in 107 games played. On December 31, 1920, the Yankees traded Lewis and George Mogridge to the Washington Senators for Braggo Roth. Lewis batted .186 in 27 games for Washington before he was released in June.

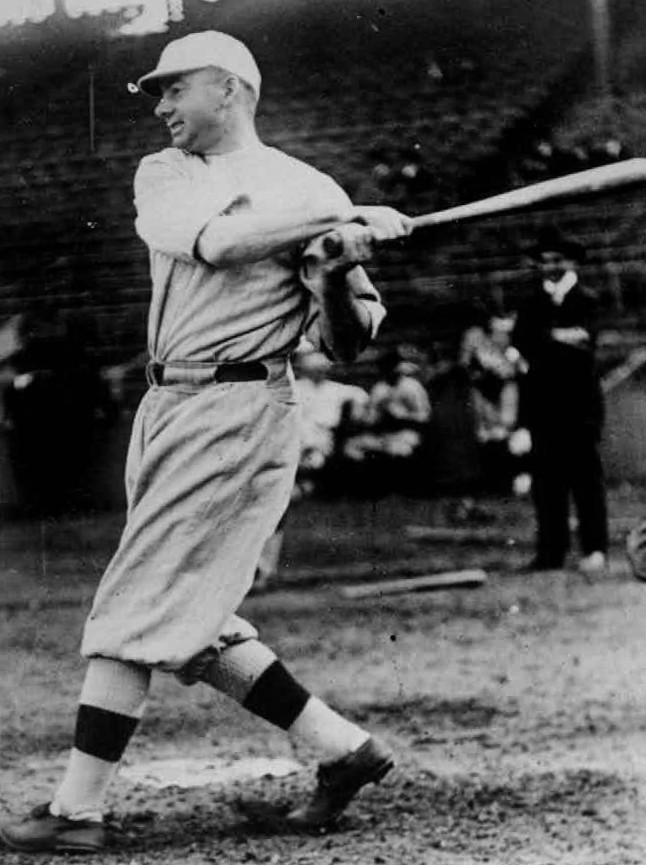
Lewis batting in 1911

After he was released from the Washington Senators, Lewis signed with the Salt Lake City Bees of the PCL for the remainder of the 1921 season. He led the PCL with a .403 batting average in 1921. He served as player-manager for Salt Lake City from 1922 through 1924. While he was with Salt Lake City, the Red Sox hired him to serve as a scout based in the Western United States. Lewis was the player-manager for the Portland Beavers of the PCL for the 1925 season, and for the Mobile Bears of the Southern Association for the 1926 season. Disappointed with the team's performance, Lewis resigned from Mobile in June 1926. He finished the 1926 season as a left fielder for the Jersey City Skeeters of the International League. In 1927, he was player-manager for the Portland Eskimos of the New England League, and they won the league championship that season. He retired as a player after the 1927 season, but remained as Portland's manager in the 1928 season. He began the 1929 season managing Portland, but resigned in June, citing poor health.

=== Career retrospective ===
Lewis led all American League left fielders in assists in 1910 (30), 1911 (27), 1912 (23), and 1913 (26). He finished his major league career with 209 assists, the third-most among major league left fielders behind Jimmy Sheckard (243) and Zach Wheat (231). Lewis also led all American League left fielders in double plays turned in 1910 (eight), and in putouts in 1910 (264) and 1912 (300). His .985 fielding percentage was the ninth-best for all American League outfielders in 1919.

At bat, Lewis was a line-drive hitter who was often the cleanup hitter in the batting order. He was considered to be a clutch hitter. In 11 seasons, Lewis batted .284 with 38 home runs, 793 RBIs, 1,518 hits, 289 doubles, and 68 triples.

=== Duffy's Cliff ===
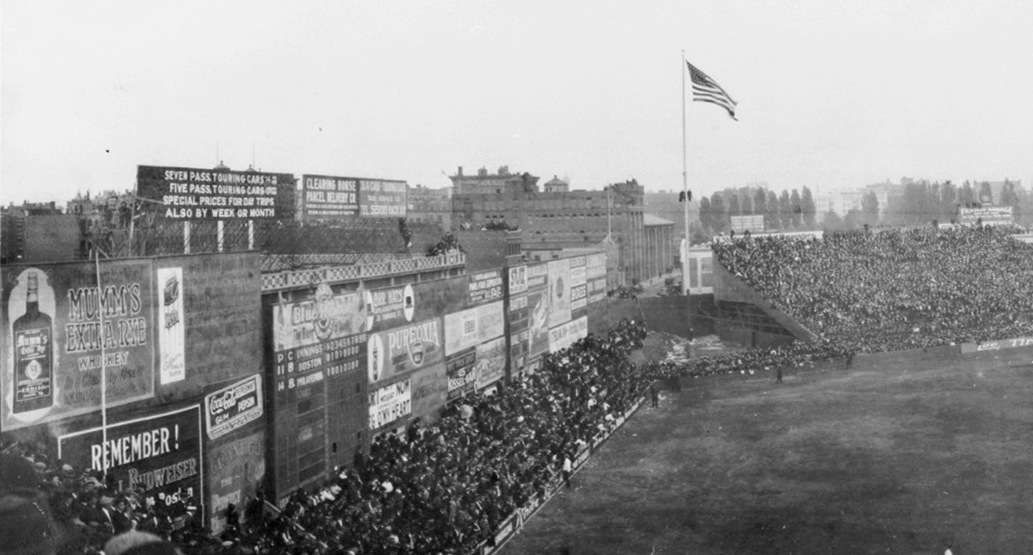
"Overflow" fan seating at Fenway Park in 1914 partly existed in front of the Green Monster's base, atop "Duffy's Cliff" (seen in the distance, nearest the flagpole)

In 1912, the Red Sox moved into Fenway Park, which featured a 10-foot (3.0 m) high mound that formed an incline in front of the 25-foot (7.6 m) left field wall, now better known as the Green Monster. Lewis practiced catching the ball on the way up the incline and throwing the ball while descending. He mastered fielding on the incline to such an extent that it became known as "Duffy's Cliff". Sports cartoons of the period often depicted him as a mountain climber making catches amid sheep and snowcaps. The mound was removed during renovations of Fenway Park conducted in 1934.

== Later career ==
Lewis had invested his money in the stock market, and lost it in the stock market crash of 1929, compelling him to return to baseball. He became a coach for the Boston Braves in 1931. He coached the Braves through 1935. Ruth played with the Braves in 1935, and Lewis witnessed Ruth's final major league home run, much as he had witnessed Ruth's first home run with the Red Sox. He became the Braves' traveling secretary in 1936, and always insisted on first class travel. Lewis stayed with the organization through their relocation to Milwaukee. He retired from the Braves in 1961.

== Later life ==
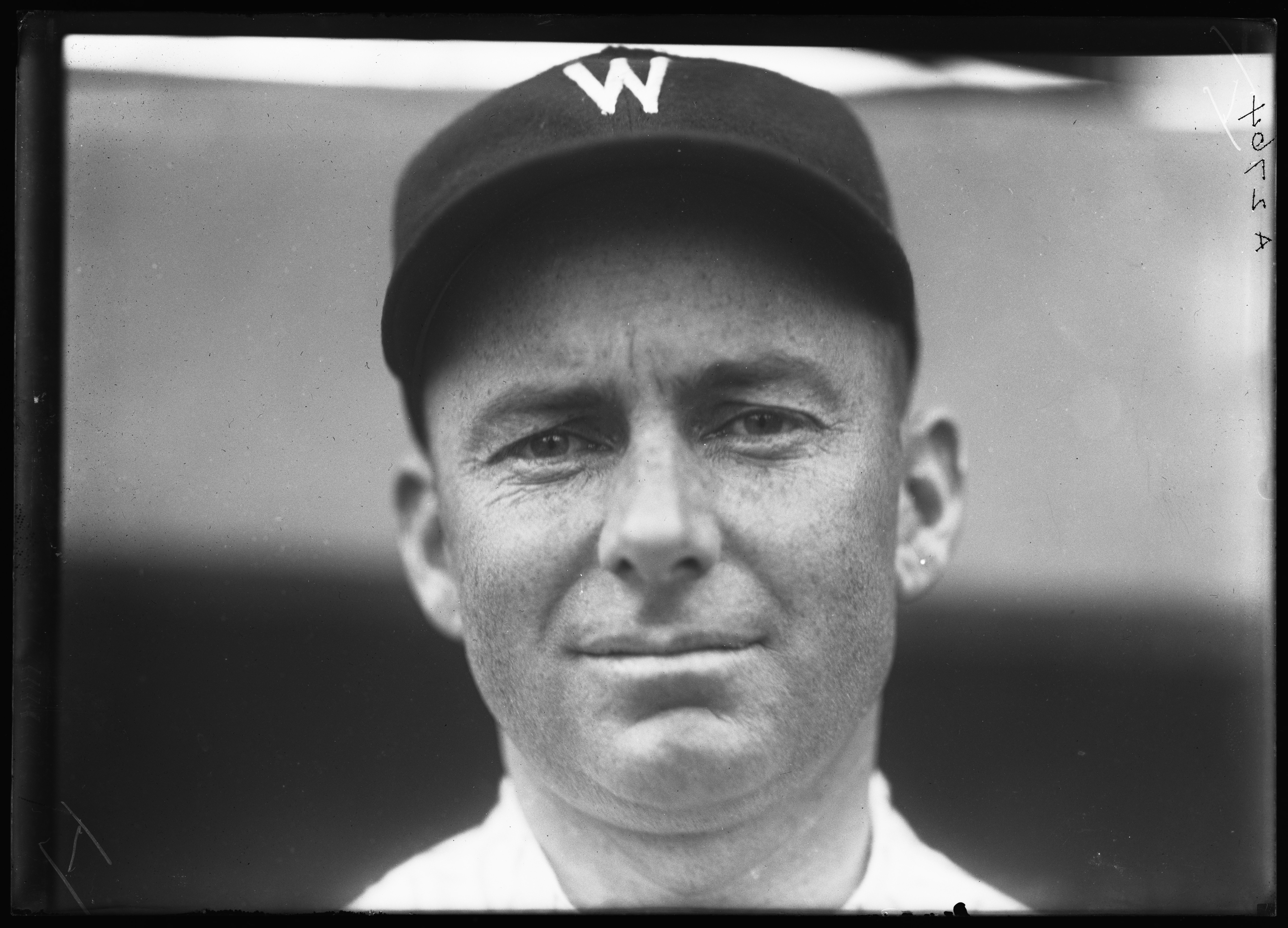
Lewis in 1921

Lewis married Eleanor Ruth Keane of Boston, a fan that he met at the Huntington Avenue Grounds, after the 1911 season. They did not have children. Together, they built a house in Boyes Hot Springs, California, but the house and their possessions were destroyed in a fire in 1923.

After his baseball career, Lewis and his wife retired to Salem, New Hampshire, where he had VIP box seats at Rockingham Park. Eleanor died in 1976.

Lewis died in Salem on June 17, 1979. He was buried at Holy Cross Cemetery in Londonderry, New Hampshire. As he had no money or living relatives, he was buried in an unmarked grave. When some volunteer caretakers found out about this, they began to raise money for one, with the Red Sox contributing. A headstone was dedicated in June 2001.

Lewis was inducted into the Boston Red Sox Hall of Fame in 2002 and into the PCL Hall of Fame in 2012.
