= Harry Hooper =

American baseball player (1887–1974)

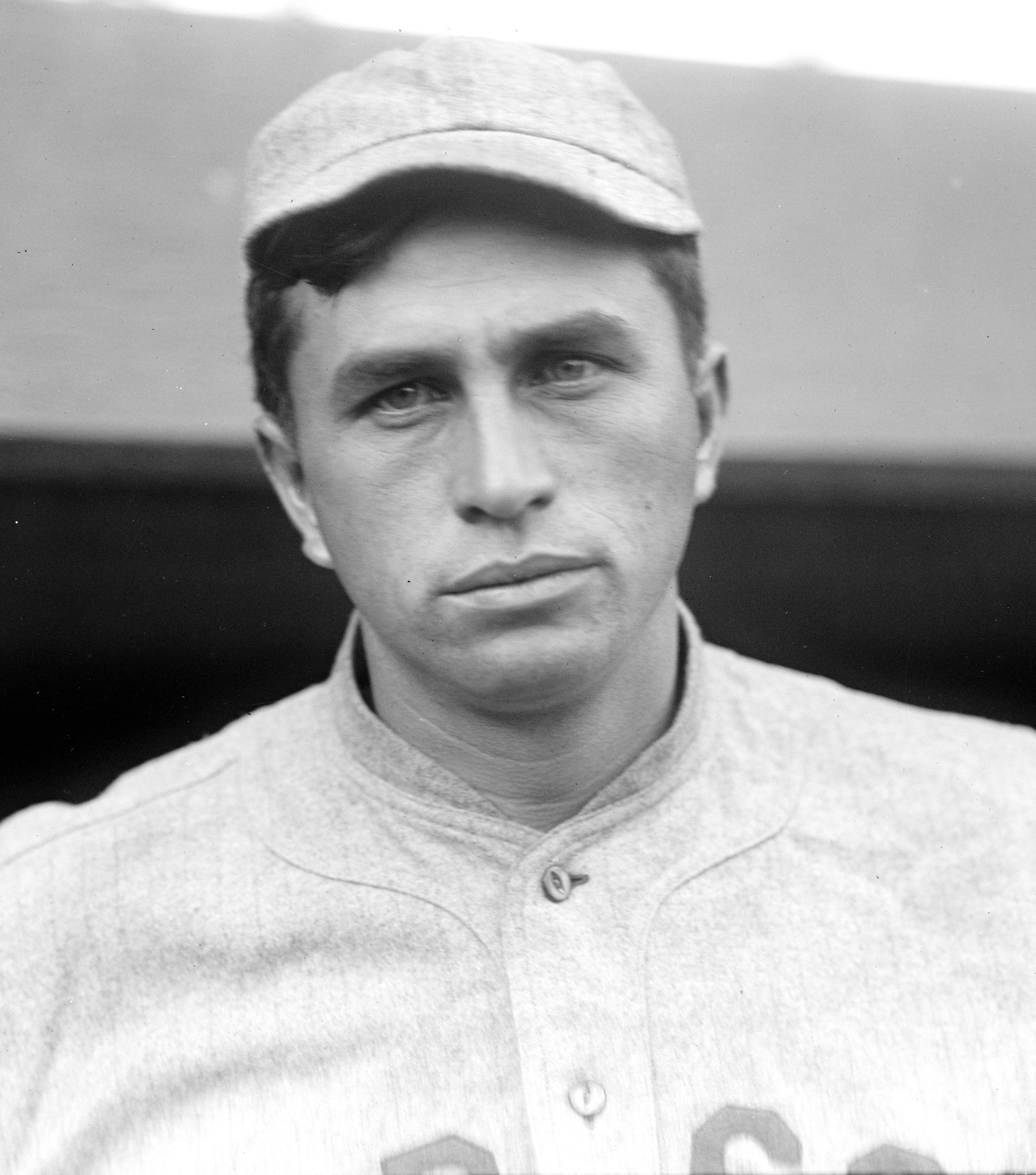
- Hooper in 1915
- Right fielder
- Born: August 24, 1887; Bell Station, California, U.S.
- Died: December 18, 1974 (aged 87); Santa Cruz, California, U.S.
- Batted: Left Threw: Right

MLB debut
- April 16, 1909, for the Boston Red Sox

Last MLB appearance
- October 4, 1925, for the Chicago White Sox

MLB statistics
- Batting average: .281
- Hits: 2,466
- Home runs: 75
- Runs batted in: 816
- Stolen bases: 375
- Stats at Baseball Reference

Teams
- Boston Red Sox (1909–1920); Chicago White Sox (1921–1925)

Career highlights and awards
- 4× World Series champion (1912, 1915, 1916, 1918); Boston Red Sox Hall of Fame

Member of the National

Baseball Hall of Fame
- Induction: 1971
- Election method: Veterans Committee

Harry Bartholomew Hooper (August 24, 1887 – December 18, 1974) was an American professional baseball right fielder who played in Major League Baseball (MLB). Hooper batted left-handed and threw right-handed. Hooper was born in Bell Station, California, and he graduated from Saint Mary's College of California. He played for major league teams between 1909 and 1925, spending most of that time with the Boston Red Sox and finishing his career with the Chicago White Sox.

Hooper was often known for his defensive skills, ranking among the league leaders in defensive categories such as putouts and assists among right fielders. He is the all-time career leader in assists and double plays by a right fielder. During several seasons with Boston, he teamed up with Duffy Lewis and Tris Speaker to form the Golden Outfield, one of the best outfield trios in baseball history. Hooper is also one of only two members of four separate Red Sox World Series championship teams (1912, 1915, 1916, 1918). He was elected to the Baseball Hall of Fame in 1971.

== Early life ==
Hooper was born on August 24, 1887, in Bell Station, California. His family had migrated to California as many other families from the United States due to the California Gold Rush. His father, Joseph "Joe" Hooper, was born in Morrell, Prince Edward Island, Canada. Joe was the fourth child and second boy born to English-born William Hooper, Harry's grandfather, and his Portuguese wife Louisa. Harry was the youngest child in his family of four; he had a sister named Lulu and twin brothers named George and Charlie. Hooper's mother, Mary Katherine (Keller), was from Frankfurt, Germany.

Hooper's two older brothers had been forced to quit school early to work on the family farm, but Hooper showed an affinity for school, especially in math. One of Hooper's teachers helped to convince his parents to allow Hooper to attend a high school in Oakland. After graduating from the high school affiliated with Saint Mary's College of California, Hooper graduated from college there with an engineering degree. At St. Mary's Hooper had demonstrated his skills both academically and on the ball field.

== Baseball career ==
=== Minor leagues ===
Hooper was a pitcher when he signed with the Oakland Commuters in 1907 to begin his minor league career, but he converted to a position player role. In 41 games with Oakland, he hit for a .301 batting average in 156 at bats. He spent the next year with the Sacramento Senators, hitting .344 in 77 games. His contract with Sacramento also provided him with work as a railroad surveyor when he was not playing baseball. Hooper did not know it at first, but his manager in Sacramento, Charles Graham, was a scout for the Boston Red Sox. Graham helped to arrange a meeting between Hooper and Red Sox owner John I. Taylor. Hooper was signed to a $2,800 contract with Boston.

=== Boston Red Sox ===
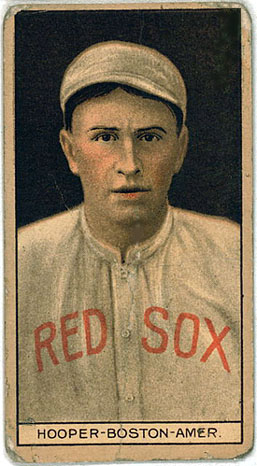
1912 baseball card of Hooper

Breaking into the majors with the Red Sox in 1909, Hooper played in 81 games and hit .282. Between 1910 and 1915, he teamed with center fielder Tris Speaker and left fielder Duffy Lewis to form the Golden Outfield, one of the finest outfield trios in baseball history. Religious differences may have been the biggest challenge for the Golden Outfield. At the time, a common Protestant sentiment was that Catholics would move to their communities and change the established culture. Speaker, who was a Protestant, once went a year without speaking to Hooper or Lewis, who were both Catholic.

Though Hooper was a hard competitor on the field, he became known for his likable personality and sense of humor, which contrasted with Speaker's tough exterior. Hooper became a favorite with the fans and he established a reputation as a clutch player. He became known as a top-caliber defensive right fielder and a solid leadoff hitter. He invented a maneuver known as the "rump-slide" for catching shallow fly balls.

In 1910, Hooper played 155 games and hit .267 in a league-leading 688 plate appearances, marking the first of 11 consecutive seasons where he had at least 564 plate appearances. He led all AL outfielders with 30 assists that season, but he also committed a league-high 18 errors. In 130 games the next year, Hooper hit .311; the outfield trio of Hooper, Lewis, and Speaker hit .315 combined.

Hooper's batting average dropped to .242 in 1912. Boston won the 1912 World Series, during which Hooper made a catch in the decisive 8th game that The Pittsburgh Press referred to as one of the finest plays in baseball history. The catch robbed Larry Doyle of a home run in a game ultimately won by the Red Sox by a score of 3-2. The paper noted that Hooper "does not seek the limelight. He is reserved and bashful, and every action of his upon the baseball field plainly shows these qualities." Red Sox pitcher Smokey Joe Wood described the catch as follows:

"Larry Doyle hit a terrific drive to deep right center, and Harry ran back at full speed and dove over the railing and into the crowd and in some way, I'll never quite figure out how, he caught the ball — I think with his bare hand. It was almost impossible to believe, even when you saw it."

On May 30, 1913, Hooper became the first player to hit a home run to lead off both games of a doubleheader, a mark only matched by Rickey Henderson, Brady Anderson, and Ronald Acuña Jr. over 80 years later. In 1914, he recorded 230 putouts in right field, which was the first of several seasons in which he finished in the top three in that category among right fielders.

On October 13, 1915, in Game 5 of the 1915 World Series, Hooper became the second player to hit two home runs in a single World Series game. Lewis contributed a third home run as the Red Sox won another world championship four games to one. Hooper was also the captain of the Red Sox in 1919. Hooper talked Boston manager Ed Barrow into converting Babe Ruth from a pitcher to an outfielder.

=== Chicago White Sox ===
Before the 1921 season, the media questioned whether Hooper would re-sign with the Red Sox for the coming season, saying that Hooper may have been disappointed not to be given an opportunity at manager. Since 1919, Red Sox owner Harry Frazee had been getting rid of expensive veteran players in what has been called a "fire-sale". The Red Sox traded Hooper to the Chicago White Sox in March 1921 in exchange for Shano Collins and Nemo Leibold. Newspaper accounts said that Hooper had not been warned about the trade, that he would demand a higher salary from the White Sox, and that he was prepared not to play unless the team met his demands.

Hooper had some of his best offensive production with the White Sox. He hit over .300 in three of the five seasons he spent with the team, and he hit a career-high 11 home runs and 80 runs batted in (RBIs) during the 1922 season. In 1922 and again in 1924, Hooper was involved in eight double plays, which led the league for outfielders in both of those seasons. In 1925, Hooper asked for his release from Chicago so that he could pursue a position as a manager.

Hooper was a career .281 hitter with 75 home runs, 817 RBI, 1429 runs, 2466 hits, 389 doubles, 160 triples, 375 stolen bases and 1136 bases on balls in 2309 games. Defensively, Hooper finished his career with a .966 fielding percentage playing at all three outfield positions. He holds the Red Sox franchise records for most triples (130) and stolen bases (300), as well as Fenway Park records for triples (63) and stolen bases (107). Hooper is only one of two players (Heinie Wagner being the other) to be a part of four Red Sox World Series championships. He hit better than .300 five times in his career and compiled a .293 batting average (27-for-92) in four World Series appearances.

== Outside baseball ==
Early in his baseball career, Hooper became involved in business interests that were unrelated to baseball. His original interest was peach orchards in Capitola, California. He later purchased additional orchards in Yuba City, and he also began to produce artichokes and pomegranates. Hooper received a military draft exemption as a farmer in 1917, but his land was mostly maintained by his father or by foremen that he hired. Given Hooper's hands-off approach to his business dealings, he relied heavily on the advice of others. Over the years, he entered into several business opportunities that lost money, including investments in an insurance agency, in oil drilling, and in juice processing. However, he was successful enough with local property investments that he avoided financial strain.

Hooper married the former Esther Henchy in 1912 and they had three children, named John, Harry Jr, and Marie. His son John played minor league baseball under Lefty Gomez in Binghamton, New York.

== Later life ==
Following his retirement from baseball, Hooper lived in Capitola and opened a real estate firm. He was named player-manager for San Francisco's minor league team in the Pacific Coast League in 1927. Hooper coached the baseball team at Princeton University for two seasons in the 1930s. He elected to leave the university when, in a cost-cutting measure prompted by the Great Depression, the administration proposed that his $5,000 annual salary be reduced by 40 percent.

Hooper was appointed postmaster in Capitola in 1933. He held that position for 24 years. He was active in civic affairs through the chamber of commerce and the improvement club. "He was one of Capitola's most prominent local citizens. Whenever something was going on in Capitola from the 1920s to the 1960s, he was involved," local museum curator Frank Perry said.

In 1939, Hooper agreed to coach Boston's professional indoor baseball league team. He remained active in later life, enjoying hunting, fishing and following the San Francisco Giants and the Red Sox.

In the late 1960s and early 1970s, John Hooper spearheaded a letter-writing campaign to get his father inducted into the Baseball Hall of Fame via the Veterans Committee. Hooper was selected to the Baseball Hall of Fame in 1971.

Hooper died on December 18, 1974, at the age of 87 in Santa Cruz, California. He had been healthy enough to attend that summer's Baseball Hall of Fame induction ceremonies and he had gone duck hunting less than a month before he died. Hooper had surgery for a circulatory issue three weeks before his death, but he seemed to have recovered well from that procedure. Harry Hooper Jr said that Hooper had died of old age. He said that Hooper was the oldest living member of the Hall of Fame before his death.

== In popular culture ==
Hooper Beach in Capitola is named for Harry Hooper. In 2014, the Capitola History Museum created an exhibit highlighting Hooper's importance in the development of the city.

== See also ==
- Boston Red Sox Hall of Fame
- The Glory of Their Times
- List of Major League Baseball career hits leaders
- List of Major League Baseball career triples leaders
- List of Major League Baseball career runs scored leaders
- List of Major League Baseball career stolen bases leaders
