= Tris Speaker =

American baseball player (1888–1958)

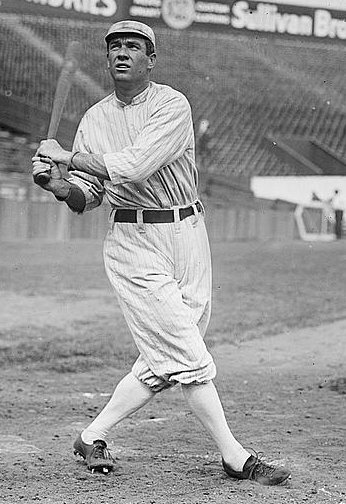
- Speaker in 1912
- Center fielder / Manager
- Born: April 4, 1888; Hubbard, Texas, U.S.
- Died: December 8, 1958 (aged 70); Whitney, Texas, U.S.
- Batted: Left Threw: Left

MLB debut
- September 12, 1907, for the Boston Americans

Last MLB appearance
- August 30, 1928, for the Philadelphia Athletics

MLB statistics
- Batting average: .345
- Hits: 3,514
- Home runs: 117
- Runs batted in: 1,531
- Doubles: 792
- Managerial record: 617–520
- Winning %: .543
- Stats at Baseball Reference
- Managerial record at Baseball Reference

Teams
- As player: Boston Americans / Red Sox (1907–1915); Cleveland Indians (1916–1926); Washington Senators (1927); Philadelphia Athletics (1928); As manager: Cleveland Indians (1919–1926)

Career highlights and awards
- 3× World Series champion (1912, 1915, 1920); AL MVP (1912); AL batting champion (1916); AL home run leader (1912); AL RBI leader (1923); MLB record 792 career doubles; Boston Red Sox Hall of Fame; Cleveland Guardians Hall of Fame

Member of the National

Baseball Hall of Fame
- Induction: 1937
- Vote: 82.1% (second ballot)

Tristram Edgar Speaker (April 4, 1888 – December 8, 1958), nicknamed "the Gray Eagle", was an American professional baseball player and manager. He played in Major League Baseball (MLB) as a center fielder from 1907 to 1928. Considered one of the greatest players in the history of Major League Baseball, he compiled a career batting average of .345 (ninth all-time). His 792 career doubles represent an MLB career record. His 3,514 hits are fifth in the all-time hits list. Defensively, Speaker holds career records for assists, double plays, and unassisted double plays by an outfielder. He held the major league career record for putouts by a center fielder (6,592) until he was surpassed by Willie Mays in 1971. His fielding glove was known as the place "where triples go to die."

After playing in the minor leagues in Texas and Arkansas, Speaker debuted with the Boston Red Sox in 1907. He became the regular center fielder by 1909 and led the Red Sox to World Series championships in 1912 and 1915. In 1915, Speaker's batting average dropped to .322 from .338 the previous season; he was traded to the Cleveland Indians when he refused to take a pay cut. As player-manager for Cleveland, he led the team to its first World Series title. In seven of his eleven seasons with Cleveland, he finished with a batting average greater than .350. Speaker resigned as Cleveland's manager in 1926 after he and Ty Cobb faced game-fixing allegations; both men were later cleared. During his managerial stint in Cleveland, Speaker introduced the platoon system in the major leagues.

Speaker played with the Washington Senators in 1927 and the Philadelphia Athletics in 1928, then became a minor league manager and part owner. He later held several roles for the Cleveland Indians. Late in life, Speaker led a short-lived indoor baseball league, ran a wholesale liquor business, worked in sales and chaired Cleveland's boxing commission. In 1937, Speaker was inducted into the Baseball Hall of Fame. He was named 27th in the Sporting News 100 Greatest Baseball Players (1999) and was also included in the Major League Baseball All-Century Team.

== Early life ==
Speaker was born on April 4, 1888, in Hubbard, Texas, to Archie and Nancy Poer Speaker. As a youth, Speaker broke his arm after he fell from a horse; the injury forced him to become left-handed. In 1905, Speaker played a year of college baseball for Fort Worth Polytechnic Institute. Newspaper reports have held that Speaker suffered a football injury and nearly had his arm amputated around this time; biographer Timothy Gay characterizes this as "a story that the macho Speaker never disspelled [sic]." He worked on a ranch before beginning his professional baseball career.

Speaker's abilities drew the interest of Doak Roberts, owner of the Cleburne Railroaders of the Texas League, in 1906. After losing several games as a pitcher, Speaker converted to outfielder to replace a Cleburne player who had been struck in the head with a pitch. He batted .318 for the Railroaders. Speaker's mother opposed his participation in the major leagues, saying that they reminded her of slavery. Though she relented, for several years Mrs. Speaker questioned why her son had not stayed home and entered the cattle or oil businesses.

He performed well for the Texas League's Houston Buffaloes in 1907, but his mother stated that she would never allow him to go to the Boston Americans. Roberts sold the youngster to the Americans for $750 or $800 (equal to $25,915 or $27,643 today). Speaker played in seven games for the Americans in 1907, with three hits in 19 at-bats for a .158 average. In 1908, Boston Americans owner John I. Taylor changed the team's name to the Boston Red Sox after the bright socks in the team's uniform. That year, the club traded Speaker to the Little Rock Travelers of the Southern League in exchange for use of their facilities for spring training. Speaker batted .350 for the Travelers and his contract was repurchased by the Red Sox. He logged a .224 batting average in 116 at-bats.

== Major league career ==
=== Early years ===
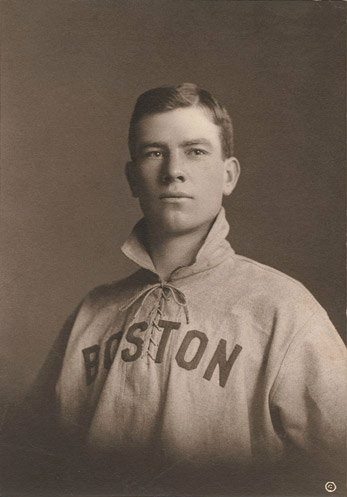
Tris Speaker in his early years

Speaker became the regular starting center fielder for Boston in 1909 and light-hitting Denny Sullivan was sold to the Cleveland Naps. Speaker hit .309 in 143 games as the team finished third in the pennant race. Defensively, Speaker was involved in 12 double plays, leading the league's outfielders, and had a .973 fielding percentage, third among outfielders. In 1910 the Red Sox signed left fielder Duffy Lewis. Speaker, Lewis and Harry Hooper formed Boston's "Million-Dollar Outfield", one of the finest outfield trios in baseball history. Speaker was the star of the Million-Dollar Outfield. He ran fast enough that he could stand very close to second base, effectively giving the team a fifth infielder, but he still caught the balls hit to center field. In 1910 and 1911, Boston finished fourth in the American League standings.

Speaker's best season came in 1912. He played every game and led the American League (AL) in doubles (53) and home runs (10). He set career highs with 222 hits, 136 runs, 580 at-bats, and 52 stolen bases. Speaker's stolen base tally was a team record until Tommy Harper stole 54 bases in 1973. He batted .383 and his .567 slugging percentage was the highest of his dead-ball days. Speaker set a major league single-season record with three hitting streaks of 20 or more games (30, 23, and 22). He also became the first major leaguer to hit 50 doubles and steal 50 bases in the same season. In August, Speaker's mother unsuccessfully attempted to convince him to quit baseball and come home. In Fenway Park's first game, Speaker drove in the winning run in the 11th inning, giving Boston the 7–6 win.

The 1912 Red Sox won the AL pennant, finishing 14 games ahead of the Washington Senators and 15 games ahead of the Philadelphia Athletics. In the 1912 World Series, Speaker led the Red Sox to their second World Series title by defeating John McGraw's New York Giants. After the second game was called on account of darkness and ended in a tie, the series went to eight games. The Red Sox won the final game after Fred Snodgrass dropped an easy fly ball and later failed to go after a Speaker pop foul. After the pop foul, Speaker tied the game with a single. The Red Sox won the game in the bottom of the tenth inning. He finished the series with a .300 batting average, nine hits and four runs scored. Speaker was named the AL Most Valuable Player (MVP) for 1912. Though he did not lead the league in any offensive categories in 1913, Speaker finished fourth in AL MVP voting. Speaker batted .338 and tied his career high of 12 double plays as an outfielder in 1914. He hit .322 in 1915. The Red Sox beat the Philadelphia Phillies in the 1915 World Series. The Red Sox were led by pitcher Babe Ruth, who was playing in his first full season. Ruth won 18 games and hit a team-high four home runs. Speaker got five hits, including a triple, in 17 at-bats during the series. He scored twice but did not drive in any runs.

=== Traded to the Indians ===
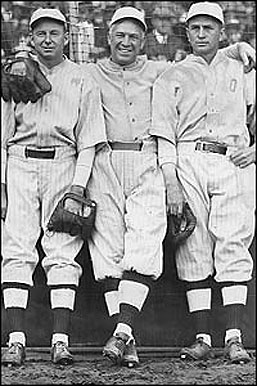
(Left to right) Duffy Lewis, Tris Speaker and Harry Hooper, members of Boston's "Million-Dollar Outfield"

After 1915, Red Sox president Joseph Lannin wanted Speaker to take a pay cut from about $15,000 (equal to $480,000 today) to about $9,000 (equal to $290,000 today) because of the drop in his batting average; Speaker refused and offered $12,000 ($380,000 today). On April 8, 1916, Lannin traded Speaker to the Cleveland Indians. In exchange, Boston received Sad Sam Jones, Fred Thomas and $50,000 ($1,480,000 today). The angry Speaker held out until he received $10,000 (equal to $300,000 today) of the cash that Boston collected.

For many years, this was considered the worst trade in Red Sox history, and was thought to be far more damaging to the Red Sox than the sale of Babe Ruth more than four years later, even though the Red Sox won the World Series in 1916 and 1918. In his book about the Red Sox-Yankees rivalry, Emperors and Idiots, Mike Vaccaro recalled that for some time, "Red Sox fans shook their head(s) in fury" when recalling the trade. Vaccaro recalled that no one knew in the winter of 1919-20 that Ruth would blossom into a superstar. In contrast, Speaker had established himself as "indisputably the best player in the American League" by 1916.

With an annual salary of $40,000 (equal to $1,180,000 today), Speaker was the highest-paid player in baseball. Speaker hit over .350 in nine of his eleven years with Cleveland. In 1916, he led the league in hits, doubles, batting average, slugging percentage and on-base percentage. In the process, he broke Cobb's run of nine consecutive AL batting titles; Speaker finished with a .386 batting average compared to Cobb's .371. The center field fence at Cleveland's Dunn Field was 460 feet (140 m) from home plate until it was shortened to 420 feet (130 m) in 1920. Even so, Speaker played so shallow in the outfield that he was able to execute six career unassisted double plays at second base, catching low line drives on the run and then beating baserunners to the bag. At least once he was credited as the pivot man in a routine double play. He was often shallow enough to catch pickoff throws at second base. At one point, Speaker's signature move was to come in behind second base on a bunt and make a tag play on a baserunner who had passed the bag.

While in Cleveland, Speaker participated in diverse activities off the baseball field. Speaker enrolled in an aviator training program in 1918. Though World War I ended less than two months after he enrolled, Speaker completed his training and served in the naval reserves for several years. He also owned a ranch in Texas and competed in roping events during the baseball offseason.

=== Stint as player-manager ===
From the day that Speaker arrived in Cleveland, he was effectively assistant manager to Lee Fohl, who rarely made an important move without consulting him. George Uhle recalled an incident from 1919 during his rookie year with the Indians. Speaker often signaled to Fohl when he thought that a pitcher should be brought in from the bullpen. On July 18, Fohl misread Speaker's signal and brought in a different pitcher than Speaker had intended. To avoid the appearance of overruling his manager, Speaker let the change stand. Pitcher Fritz Coumbe lost the game, Fohl resigned that night and Speaker became manager. Uhle said that Speaker felt bad for contributing to Fohl's departure.

Speaker guided the 1920 Indians to their first World Series win. In a crucial late season game against the second-place White Sox, Speaker caught a hard line drive hit to deep right-center field by Shoeless Joe Jackson, ending the game. On a dead run, Speaker leaped with both feet off the ground, snaring the ball before crashing into a concrete wall. As he lay unconscious from the impact, Speaker still held the baseball. In the 1920 World Series against Brooklyn, Speaker hit an RBI triple in the deciding game, which the Indians won 3–0. Cleveland's 1920 season was also significant due to the death of Ray Chapman on August 17. Chapman died after being hit in the head by a pitch from Carl Mays. Chapman had been asked about retirement before the season, and he said that he wanted to help Speaker earn Cleveland's first World Series victory before thinking of retirement.

During that championship season, Speaker is credited with introducing the platoon system, which attempted to match right-handed batters against left-handed pitchers and vice versa. Sportswriter John B. Sheridan was among the critics of the system, saying, "The specialist in baseball is no good and won't go very far... The whole effect of the system will be to make the players affected half men... It is farewell, a long farewell to all that player's chance of greatness... It destroys young ball players by destroying their most precious quality — confidence in their ability to hit any pitcher, left or right, alive, dead, or waiting to be born." Baseball Magazine was supportive, pointing out that Speaker had results that backed up his system.

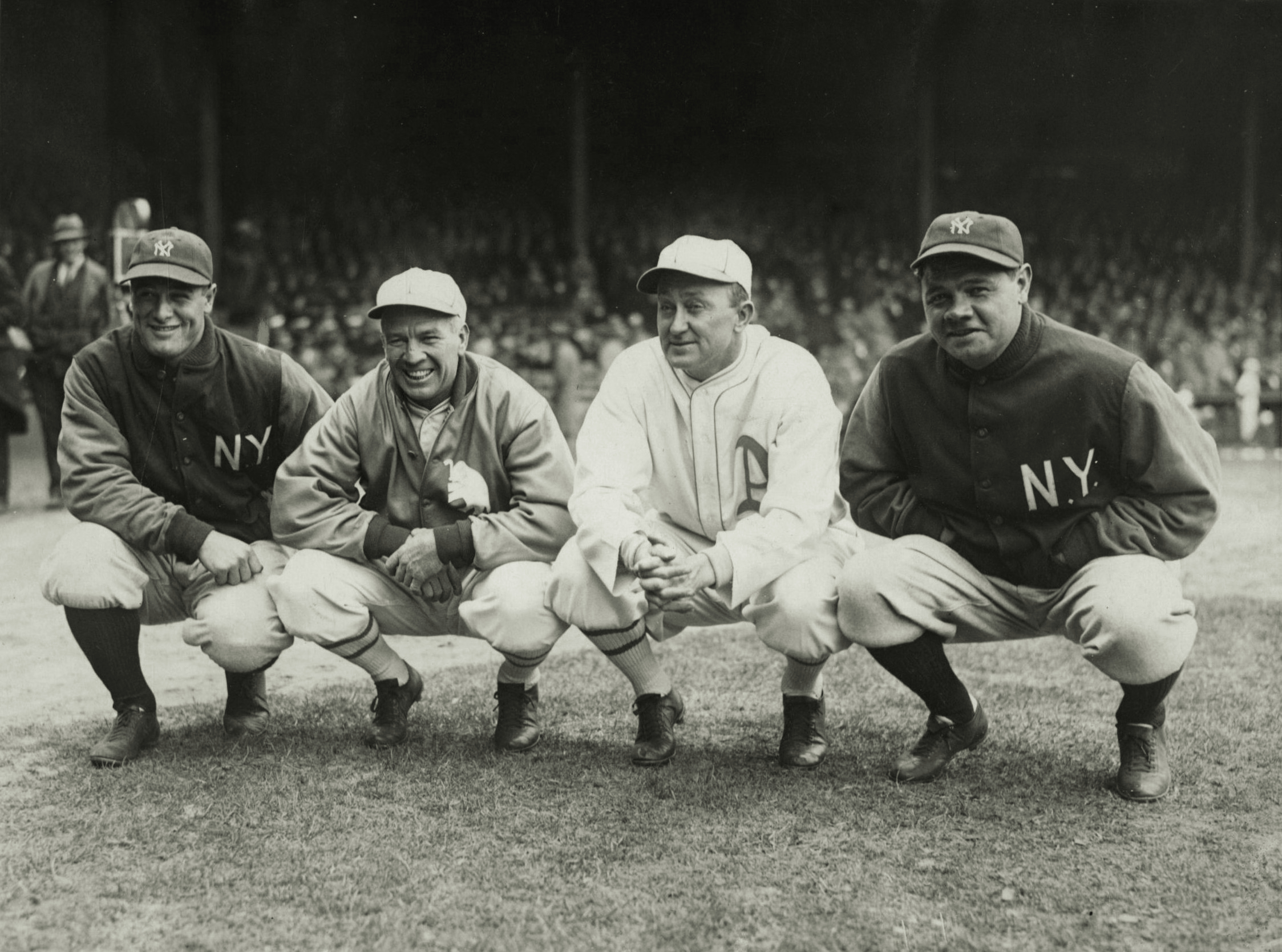
Lou Gehrig, Speaker, Ty Cobb, and Babe Ruth, 1928

The 1921 Indians remained in a tight pennant race all year, finishing 4 1/2 games behind the Yankees. The Indians did not seriously contend for the pennant from 1922 through 1925. Speaker led the league in doubles eight times, including every year between 1920 and 1923. He led the league's outfielders in fielding percentage in 1921 and 1922. On May 17, 1925, Speaker became the fifth member of the 3,000 hit club when he hit a single off pitcher Tom Zachary of the Washington Senators. Only Napoleon Lajoie had previously accomplished the feat as a member of the Indians. AL President Ban Johnson asked Speaker and Detroit manager Cobb to resign their posts after a scandal broke in 1926. Pitcher Dutch Leonard claimed that Speaker and Cobb fixed at least one game between Cleveland and Detroit. In a newspaper column published shortly before the hearings were to begin, Billy Evans characterized the accusations as "purely a matter of personal revenge" for Leonard. The pitcher was said to be upset with Cobb and Speaker after a trade ended with Leonard in the minor leagues. When Leonard refused to appear at the January 5, 1927, hearings to discuss his accusations, Commissioner Landis cleared both Speaker and Cobb of any wrongdoing. Both were reinstated to their original teams, but each team declared its manager free to sign elsewhere. Speaker did not return to big league managing and he finished his MLB managerial career with a 617–520 record.

At the time of his 1926 resignation, news reports described Speaker as permanently retiring from baseball to pursue business ventures. However, Speaker signed to play with the Washington Senators for 1927. Cobb joined the Philadelphia Athletics. Speaker joined Cobb in Philadelphia for the 1928 season; he played part time and finished with a .267 average. Prior to that season, Speaker had not hit for a batting average below .300 since 1908. Speaker's major league playing career ended after 1928. He retired with 792 doubles, an all-time career record. Defensively, Speaker holds the all-time career records for assists as an outfielder and double plays as an outfielder. He remains the last batter to hit 200 triples in a career.

== Later life ==
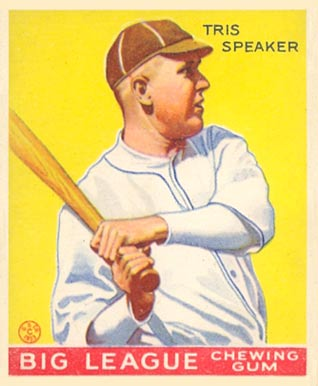
Speaker's 1933 Goudey Gum Company baseball card

In 1929 Speaker replaced Walter Johnson as the manager of the Newark Bears of the International League. In two seasons with Newark, he also appeared as a player in 59 games. When Speaker resigned during his second season, the Bears were in seventh place after a sixth-place finish in 1929. In 1931, he called Chicago Cubs and Chicago White Sox games for WENR. In January 1933 he became a part owner and manager of the Kansas City Blues. By May, Speaker had been replaced as manager but remained secretary of the club. By 1936, he had sold his share of the team. In 1937, Speaker was voted into the Baseball Hall of Fame during its second year of balloting. He was honored at the hall's first induction ceremony in 1939.

After his playing and managing days, Speaker was an entrepreneur and salesman. By 1937, Speaker had opened a wholesale liquor business and worked as a state sales representative for a steel company. He chaired Cleveland's boxing commission between 1936 and 1943. Newspaper coverage credited Speaker with several key reforms to boxing in Cleveland, including the recruitment of new officials and protections against fight fixing. Under Speaker, fight payouts went directly to boxers rather than managers. Speaker sorted out a scheduling conflict for a 1940 boxing match in Cleveland involving former middleweight champion Teddy Yarosz. Yarosz defeated Jimmy Reeves in ten rounds and the fight attracted over 8,300 spectators.

In 1937, Speaker sustained a 16-foot fall while working on a flower box near a second-story window at his home. Upon admission to the hospital, he underwent facial surgery. He was described as having "better than an even chance to live" and was suffering from a skull fracture, a broken arm and possible internal injuries. He ultimately recovered.

In 1939, Speaker was president of the National Professional Indoor Baseball League. The league had teams in New York, Brooklyn, Philadelphia, Boston, Cleveland, Chicago, Cincinnati and St. Louis. The league shut down operations due to poor attendance only two months after its formation. Speaker was one of the founders of Cleveland's Society for Crippled Children and he helped to promote the society's rehabilitation center, Camp Cheerful. Speaker served as vice president of the society, ran fundraising campaigns and received a distinguished service award from the organization. He became seriously ill with pneumonia in 1942. Speaker ultimately recovered, but Gay characterized Speaker's condition as "touch-and-go for several days". In 1947, Speaker returned to baseball as "ambassador of good will" for Bill Veeck and the Cleveland Indians. He remained in advisory, coaching or scouting roles for the Indians until his death in 1958. In an article in the July 1952 issue of SPORT, Speaker recounted how Veeck hired him in 1947 to be a coaching consultant to Larry Doby, the first black player in the AL and the second in the major leagues. Before the Indians had signed Doby, he was the star second baseman of the Newark Eagles of the Negro leagues. A SPORT photograph that accompanied the article shows Speaker mentoring five members of the Indians: Luke Easter, Jim Hegan, Ray Boone, Al Rosen and Doby. Speaker was inducted into the Texas Sports Hall of Fame in 1951. Texas was the first state to establish a state sports hall of fame and Speaker was in its inaugural induction class.

== Death ==
Speaker died of a heart attack on December 8, 1958, at the age of 70, at Lake Whitney, Texas. He collapsed as he and a friend were pulling their boat into the dock after a fishing trip. It was his second heart attack in four years. Speaker was buried at Fairview Cemetery in Hubbard, Texas.

After Speaker's death, Cobb said, "Terribly depressed. I never let him know how much I admired him when we were playing against each other... It was only after we finally became teammates and then retired that I could tell Tris Speaker of the underlying respect I had for him." Lajoie said, "He was one of the greatest fellows I ever knew, both as a baseball player and as a gentleman." Former Boston teammate Duffy Lewis said, "He was a team player. As great a hitter as he was, he wasn't looking out for his own average ... Speaker was the bell cow of our outfield. Harry Hooper and I would watch him and know how to play the hitters."

== Legacy ==
Line-Up for Yesterday

S is for Speaker,
Swift center-field tender,
When the ball saw him coming,
It yelled, "I surrender."

— Ogden Nash, Sport magazine (January 1949)

Immediately after Speaker's death, the baseball field at the city park in Cleburne, Texas, was renamed in honor of Speaker. In 1961, the Tris Speaker Memorial Award was created by the Baseball Writers' Association of America to honor players or officials who make outstanding contributions to baseball. In 1999, he ranked number 27 on the Sporting News' list of the 100 Greatest Baseball Players. He was named to the Major League Baseball All-Century Team. Speaker is mentioned in the poem "Line-Up for Yesterday" by Ogden Nash.

In 2008, former baseball players' union chief Marvin Miller, trying to defend the recently retired catcher Mike Piazza against claims that he should not be elected to the Hall of Fame because of association with the use of steroids, on the basis that the Hall of Fame has various unsavory people in it, opined that Speaker should be removed from the Hall of Fame because of alleged membership in the Ku Klux Klan. Miller said, "Some of the early people inducted in the Hall were members of the Ku Klux Klan: Tris Speaker, Cap Anson, and some people suspect Ty Cobb as well. I think that by and large, the players, and certainly the ones I knew, are good people. But the Hall is full of villains." Speaker-Cobb-Rogers Hornsby biographer Charles C. Alexander, a Klan expert in his general history writings, told fellow baseball author Marty Appel, apparently referring to the 1920s, "As I've suggested in the biographies, it's possible that they [Speaker, Cobb and Hornsby] were briefly in the Klan, which was very strong in Texas and especially in Fort Worth and Dallas. The Klan went all out to recruit prominent people in all fields, provided they were native born, Protestant and white."

Baseball historian Bill James does not dispute this claim in apparently referring to Speaker and possibly Cobb, but says that the Klan had toned down its racist overtures during the 1920s and pulled in hundreds of thousands of men, including Hugo Black. James adds that Speaker was a staunch supporter of Doby when he broke the American League color barrier, working long hours with the former second baseman on how to play the outfield.

== Regular season statistics ==
G	AB	R	H	2B	3B	HR	RBI	SB	CS	BB	SO	BA	OBP	SLG	OPS	TB	SH	HBP
2789	10195	1882	3514	792	222	117	1531	432	129	1381	220	.345	.428	.500	.928	5101	309	103

== Managerial record ==
Team	Year	Regular season					Postseason			
Team	Year	Games	Won	Lost	Win %	Finish	Won	Lost	Win %	Result
CLE	1919	61	40	21	.656	2nd in AL	–	–	–	–
CLE	1920	154	98	56	.636	1st in AL	5	2	.714	Won World Series (BKN)
CLE	1921	154	94	60	.610	2nd in AL	–	–	–	–
CLE	1922	154	78	76	.506	4th in AL	–	–	–	–
CLE	1923	153	82	71	.536	3rd in AL	–	–	–	–
CLE	1924	153	67	86	.438	6th in AL	–	–	–	–
CLE	1925	154	70	84	.455	6th in AL	–	–	–	–
CLE	1926	154	88	66	.571	2nd in AL	–	–	–	–
Total		1137	617	520	.543		5	2	.714	

== See also ==
- Boston Red Sox Hall of Fame
- List of Major League Baseball players to hit for the cycle
- List of Major League Baseball batting champions
- List of Major League Baseball annual doubles leaders
- List of Major League Baseball doubles records
- List of Major League Baseball hit records
- List of Major League Baseball annual home run leaders
- List of Major League Baseball career stolen bases leaders
- List of Major League Baseball player-managers
- List of Major League Baseball career triples leaders
- List of Major League Baseball career runs scored leaders
- List of Major League Baseball career runs batted in leaders
- List of Major League Baseball career hits leaders
- List of Major League Baseball career doubles leaders
- List of Major League Baseball career total bases leaders
- List of Major League Baseball triples records

== Notes ==
Preceded by Ed Delahanty	Single season doubles record holders 1923–1925	Succeeded by George Burns
Preceded by Home Run Baker	Hitting for the cycle June 9, 1912	Succeeded by Chief Meyers
