= 1979 Major League Baseball postseason =

1979 Major League Baseball playoffs

Tournament details
- Dates: October 2–17, 1979
- Teams: 4

Final positions
- Champions: Pittsburgh Pirates (5th title)
- Runners-up: Baltimore Orioles

Tournament statistics
- Games played: 14
- Attendance: 711,136 (50,795 per game)
- Best BA: Phil Garner (PIT) (.472)
- Most HRs: Willie Stargell (PIT) (5)
- Most SBs: Four tied (2)
- Most Ks (as pitcher): Jim Bibby (PIT) & Mike Flanagan (BAL) (35)

Awards
- MVP: Willie Stargell (PIT)

The 1979 Major League Baseball postseason was the playoff tournament of Major League Baseball for the 1979 season. The winners of each division advance to the postseason and face each other in a League Championship Series to determine the pennant winners that face each other in the World Series.

In the American League, the Baltimore Orioles returned to the postseason for the first time since 1974, and the California Angels made their first postseason appearance in franchise history.

In the National League, the Pittsburgh Pirates made their sixth postseason appearance in the past decade, along with the Cincinnati Reds. This was the last postseason appearance for both Cincinnati and Pittsburgh until 1990.

This was the first postseason since 1975 to not feature either the New York Yankees, Kansas City Royals, Philadelphia Phillies, or Los Angeles Dodgers, and the first since 1969 where neither team from the previous year’s World Series appeared in the postseason. The former three teams returned in the following postseason, and all four returned in the expanded 1981 and 2024 postseasons.

The playoffs began on October 2, 1979, and concluded on October 17, 1979, with the Pirates again defeating the Orioles in seven games in the 1979 World Series. The Pirates won their fifth and most recent title in franchise history.

== Teams ==
American League Teams National League Teams

The following teams qualified for the postseason:

=== American League ===
- Baltimore Orioles – 102–57, AL East champions
- California Angels – 88–74, AL West champions

=== National League ===
- Pittsburgh Pirates – 98–64, NL East champions
- Cincinnati Reds – 90–71, NL West champions

== Playoff bracket ==
League Championship Series (ALCS, NLCS)
East	Baltimore	3
West	California	1
East	Pittsburgh	3
West	Cincinnati	0

World Series
AL	Baltimore	3
NL	Pittsburgh	4

== American League Championship Series ==
=== California Angels vs. Baltimore Orioles ===
Baltimore won the series, 3–1.

Game	Date	Score	Location	Time	Attendance
1	October 3	California Angels – 3, Baltimore Orioles – 6 (10)	Memorial Stadium	3:10	52,787
2	October 4	California Angels – 8, Baltimore Orioles – 9	Memorial Stadium	2:51	52,108
3	October 5	Baltimore Orioles – 3, California Angels – 4	Anaheim Stadium	2:59	43,199
4	October 6	Baltimore Orioles – 8, California Angels – 0	Anaheim Stadium	2:56	43,199

This was the first ALCS since 1975 to not feature either the New York Yankees or Kansas City Royals. The Orioles defeated the Angels in four games to return to the World Series for the fourth time in eleven years.

The Orioles prevailed in an extra-inning Game 1 off a walk-off three-run home run from John Lowenstein in the bottom of the tenth. Game 2 was an offensive slugfest which the Orioles won to take a 2–0 series lead headed to Anaheim. In Game 3, the Angels won their first postseason game in franchise history, as Larry Harlow hit an RBI double to overcome a late Orioles' lead in the bottom of the ninth. However, the series would wrap up in Game 4, as Scott McGregor pitched a six-hit complete-game shutout in a blowout win for the Orioles.

This was the first of three consecutive losses in the ALCS for the Angels. In 1982, they would blow a two-games-to-none lead to the Milwaukee Brewers after being nine outs away from the pennant in Game 5, and in 1986 they blew a 3–1 series lead to the Boston Red Sox after being a strike away from the pennant in Game 5. The Angels would then win the pennant in 2002 over the Minnesota Twins in five games en route to a World Series title.

With the win, the Orioles became the first franchise to beat both of the Greater Los Angeles area teams in the postseason, having previously defeated the Dodgers in the 1966 World Series. The Orioles would win their next and most recent pennant four years later over the Chicago White Sox in four games en route to a World Series title.

== National League Championship Series ==
=== Pittsburgh Pirates vs. Cincinnati Reds ===
Pittsburgh won the series, 3–0.

Game	Date	Score	Location	Time	Attendance
1	October 2	Pittsburgh Pirates – 5, Cincinnati Reds – 2 (11)	Riverfront Stadium	3:14	55,006
2	October 3	Pittsburgh Pirates – 3, Cincinnati Reds – 2 (10)	Riverfront Stadium	3:24	55,000
3	October 5	Cincinnati Reds – 1, Pittsburgh Pirates – 7	Three Rivers Stadium	2:45	42,240

This was the fourth postseason meeting of the Pirates–Reds rivalry this decade. The Reds won in 1970, 1972, and 1975. This time, the Pirates would return the favor, sweeping the Reds and returning to the World Series for the second time in nine years (in the process denying a rematch of the 1970 World Series between the Reds and Orioles).

The Pirates stole Game 1 in Cincinnati in extra innings, capped off by a three-run home run by Willie Stargell in the top of the eleventh. They won Game 2 in extra innings as well, taking a 2–0 series lead headed back to Pittsburgh. Bert Blyleven pitched a complete game in Game 3 as the Pirates blew out the Reds to secure the pennant, exacting long-awaited revenge on their hated rivals.

As of 2026, this is the last time the Pirates won the NL pennant, and is their third-most recent victory in a postseason series. The Pirates currently hold the longest pennant drought of any National League team. They would return the NLCS in 1990, but lost in six games to the eventual World Series champion Reds. Aside from the Seattle Mariners, the only team left that has yet to win a pennant, the Pirates hold the longest active pennant drought in the majors, which currently stands at 47 years.

== 1979 World Series ==
=== Baltimore Orioles (AL) vs. Pittsburgh Pirates (NL) ===
Pittsburgh won the series, 4–3.

Game	Date	Score	Location	Time	Attendance
1	October 10	Pittsburgh Pirates – 4, Baltimore Orioles – 5	Memorial Stadium	3:18	53,735
2	October 11	Pittsburgh Pirates – 3, Baltimore Orioles – 2	Memorial Stadium	3:13	53,739
3	October 12	Baltimore Orioles – 8, Pittsburgh Pirates – 4	Three Rivers Stadium	2:51	50,848
4	October 13	Baltimore Orioles – 9, Pittsburgh Pirates – 6	Three Rivers Stadium	3:48	50,883
5	October 14	Baltimore Orioles – 1, Pittsburgh Pirates – 7	Three Rivers Stadium	2:54	50,920
6	October 16	Pittsburgh Pirates – 4, Baltimore Orioles – 0	Memorial Stadium	2:30	53,739
7	October 17	Pittsburgh Pirates – 4, Baltimore Orioles – 1	Memorial Stadium	2:54	53,733

This was a rematch of the 1971 World Series, which the Pirates won in seven games after being down two games to none in the series. Once again, the Pirates defeated the Orioles in seven games, becoming the fourth team in World Series history to come back from a 3–1 series deficit to win the championship.

In a freezing cold Game 1, the Orioles fended off a late Pirates rally to win. Game 1’s temperature of 41 °F (5 °C) was the coldest temperature a World Series game was played in until Game 4 of the 1997 World Series. Freezing rain resulted in a combined six errors, with three committed by both teams. of The Pirates evened the series as Manny Sanguillén hit a go-ahead RBI single that scored catcher Ed Ott in the top of the ninth inning of Game 2. In Pittsburgh for Game 3, the Pirates jumped out to an early lead, but the Orioles went on a 7–1 run through the next four innings to take the lead for good and win, and Scott McGregor pitched another complete game for the Orioles this postseason. In Game 4, the Pirates held a 6–3 lead going into the top of the eighth, but the Orioles put together an unprecedented rally with six unanswered runs to win 9–6 and take a 3–1 series lead. The Pirates blew out the Orioles in Game 5 to send the series back to Baltimore. Game 5 was the last World Series game ever played at Three Rivers Stadium, as well as the most recent World Series game played in Pittsburgh to date.

Game 6 started off as a pitchers' duel between Pittsburgh's John Candelaria and Baltimore's Jim Palmer, but the Pirates broke the game open in the seventh and eighth, scoring two runs in both innings to go ahead for good, and closer Kent Tekulve preserved the lead for the Pirates, forcing a seventh game. The Orioles jumped out to a 1–0 lead early, but the Pirates would ultimately prevail, as Willie Stargell hit a two-run home run off McGregor in the top of the sixth to put the Pirates ahead for good, and then for insurance in the ninth, Omar Moreno collected an RBI single, while another run scored when Dave Parker and Bill Robinson were hit by pitches back-to-back, scoring Moreno. Tekulve secured the title for the Pirates in the bottom of the ninth, earning his third save of the series. The Pirates were also the last team to win Game 7 of the World Series on the road until the San Francisco Giants did so in 2014.

Along with the Pittsburgh Steelers winning Super Bowl XIII earlier in the year, the city of Pittsburgh had both Super Bowl and World Series championships in the same season or calendar year. As of 2026, this is Pittsburgh’s last appearance in the World Series, and their second-most recent victory in a postseason series. They currently hold the longest World Series appearance drought in the National League, second longest World Series appearance drought behind only the Seattle Mariners - the only team left that has yet to make a World Series, and the fifth longest championship drought in the majors. After their World Series win, the Pirates entered a slump, as the team would only make the postseason six times since their last World Series win.

The Orioles would return to the World Series one more time in 1983, where they defeated the Philadelphia Phillies in five games for their most recent title.

== Broadcasting ==
NBC televised both LCS nationally in the United States. Each team's local broadcaster also televised coverage of LCS games. ABC aired the World Series.
