= 1990 Major League Baseball postseason =

1990 Major League Baseball playoffs

Tournament details
- Dates: October 4–20, 1990
- Teams: 4

Final positions
- Champions: Cincinnati Reds (5th title)
- Runners-up: Oakland Athletics

Tournament statistics
- Games played: 14
- Attendance: 684,623 (48,902 per game)
- Best BA: Billy Hatcher (CIN) (.519)
- Most HRs: Chris Sabo (CIN) (3)
- Most SBs: Rickey Henderson (OAK) (5)
- Most Ks (as pitcher): José Rijo (CIN) (29)

Awards
- MVP: José Rijo (CIN)

The 1990 Major League Baseball postseason was the playoff tournament of Major League Baseball for the 1990 season. The winners of each division advance to the postseason and face each other in a League Championship Series to determine the pennant winners that face each other in the World Series.

In the American League, the Boston Red Sox reached the postseason for the third time in five years, and the Oakland Athletics made their third consecutive appearance.

In the National League, the Cincinnati Reds and Pittsburgh Pirates both returned to the postseason for the first time since 1979. This was the first of three straight postseason appearances for the Pirates.

The same four teams – the Reds, Pirates, Red Sox, and Athletics – had qualified for the postseason fifteen years before. They would all return again under an expanded format in the 2013 postseason. As of 2026, this is the last time the postseason field featured the same teams from a previous season.

This was the last edition of the postseason until 2006 to not feature the Atlanta Braves, who would make fourteen straight postseason appearances from 1991 to 2005 (excluding 1994, when the season was cancelled due to a strike).

The playoffs began on October 4, 1990, and concluded on October 28, 1990, with the Reds shocking the defending World Series champion Athletics in a four-game sweep to win their first title since 1976. It was the Reds’ fifth title in franchise history.

== Playoff seeds ==
American League Teams National League Teams

The following teams qualified for the postseason:

=== American League ===
- Boston Red Sox – 88–74, AL East champions
- Oakland Athletics – 103–59, AL West champions

=== National League ===
- Pittsburgh Pirates – 95–67, NL East champions
- Cincinnati Reds – 91–71, NL West champions

== Playoff bracket ==
League Championship Series (ALCS, NLCS)
East	Boston	0
West	Oakland	4
East	Pittsburgh	2
West	Cincinnati	4

World Series
AL	Oakland	0
NL	Cincinnati	4

== American League Championship Series ==
=== Boston Red Sox vs. Oakland Athletics ===
Oakland won the series, 4–0.

Game	Date	Score	Location	Time	Attendance
1	October 6	Oakland Athletics – 9, Boston Red Sox – 1	Fenway Park	3:26	35,192
2	October 7	Oakland Athletics – 4, Boston Red Sox – 1	Fenway Park	3:42	35,070
3	October 9	Boston Red Sox – 1, Oakland Athletics – 4	Oakland-Alameda County Coliseum	2:47	49,026
4	October 10	Boston Red Sox – 1, Oakland Athletics – 3	Oakland-Alameda County Coliseum	3:02	49,052

This was the third postseason meeting between the Red Sox and Athletics (1975, 1988). The Athletics once again swept the Red Sox and advanced to the World Series for the third year in a row (in the process denying a rematch of the 1975 World Series between the Red Sox and Reds).

The series was not close - the Red Sox were held to just one run in all four games. Dave Stewart pitched eight solid innings as the Athletics blew out the Red Sox in Game 1. Bob Welch and Dennis Eckersley kept the Red Sox offense at bay in Game 2 as the Athletics won 4-1 to take a 2-0 series lead headed back home. Mike Moore and Eckersley helped the Athletics prevail by an identical 4-1 score in Game 3 to take a commanding 3-0 series lead. Stewart once again out-dueled Boston’s Roger Clemens in Game 4 as he and closer Rick Honeycutt kept the Red Sox offense to just one run scored again to complete the sweep in a 3-1 victory.

As of 2026, this is the last time the Athletics won the AL pennant, and it would ultimately be the final one they would win during their time in Oakland, as the team would relocate to Las Vegas. The Athletics returned to the ALCS two years later, but lost to the eventual World Series champion Toronto Blue Jays in six games.

The Red Sox would return to the ALCS in 1999, but lost to their archrival and eventual World Series champion New York Yankees in five games.

Both teams would meet once more in the ALDS in 2003, which would be won by the Red Sox.

== National League Championship Series ==
=== Cincinnati Reds vs. Pittsburgh Pirates ===
Cincinnati won the series, 4–2.

Game	Date	Score	Location	Time	Attendance
1	October 4	Pittsburgh Pirates – 4, Cincinnati Reds – 3	Riverfront Stadium	2:51	52,911
2	October 5	Pittsburgh Pirates – 1, Cincinnati Reds – 2	Riverfront Stadium	2:38	54,456
3	October 8	Cincinnati Reds – 6, Pittsburgh Pirates – 3	Three Rivers Stadium	2:51	45,611
4	October 9	Cincinnati Reds – 5, Pittsburgh Pirates – 3	Three Rivers Stadium	3:00	50,461
5	October 10	Cincinnati Reds – 2, Pittsburgh Pirates – 3	Three Rivers Stadium	2:48	48,221
6	October 12	Pittsburgh Pirates – 1, Cincinnati Reds – 2	Riverfront Stadium	2:57	56,079

This was the fifth postseason meeting in the history of the Pirates–Reds rivalry (1970, 1972, 1975, 1979). The Reds defeated the Pirates in six games to advance to their first World Series since 1976.

The Pirates stole Game 1 on the road by overcoming a 3–0 Reds lead to win 4–3. Despite Doug Drabek pitching a complete game for the Pirates in Game 2, it wasn't enough as the Reds evened the series. When the series moved to Pittsburgh, a three-run homer by Mariano Duncan in the top of the fifth propelled the Reds to victory in Game 3. José Rijo pitched seven solid innings and the Reds would overcome an early Pirates lead to take Game 4 and go up 3–1 in the series. The Pirates sent the series back to Cincinnati with a 3–2 victory in Game 5, as Drabek out-dueled Browning. In Game 6, the Reds narrowly prevailed as Luis Quiñones hit an RBI single to put the Reds ahead for good, securing the pennant.

This was the first of three consecutive losses in the NLCS for the Pirates. They returned the next year, as well as in 1992, and they lost both to the Atlanta Braves in seven games after being an out away from the pennant in Game 7 of their 1992 rematch.

As of 2026, this is the last time that the Reds won the NL pennant, who hold the fourth longest pennant drought alongside the Athletics. The Reds would return to the NLCS in 1995, but were swept by the eventual World Series champion Atlanta Braves. This was the last conference championship won by a Cincinnati-based team until the NFL’s Cincinnati Bengals won the AFC title in January 2022.

== 1990 World Series ==
=== Oakland Athletics (AL) vs. Cincinnati Reds (NL) ===
Cincinnati won the series, 4–0.

Game	Date	Score	Location	Time	Attendance
1	October 16	Oakland Athletics – 0, Cincinnati Reds – 7	Riverfront Stadium	2:48	55,830
2	October 17	Oakland Athletics – 4, Cincinnati Reds – 5 (10)	Riverfront Stadium	3:31	55,832
3	October 19	Cincinnati Reds – 8, Oakland Athletics – 3	Oakland–Alameda County Coliseum	3:01	48,269
4	October 20	Cincinnati Reds – 2, Oakland Athletics – 1	Oakland–Alameda County Coliseum	2:48	48,613

This was a rematch of the 1972 World Series, which the Athletics won in seven games, marking the start of a three-peat from 1972 to 1974. In what is considered to be one of the biggest upsets in World Series history, the Reds shockingly swept the Athletics to win their first championship since 1976 and their fifth overall.

In Game 1, the Reds blew out the Athletics as José Rijo and closer Randy Myers blanked the A's offense the whole game. Game 2 was the only contest of the series to go into extra innings, and the Reds prevailed thanks to a walk-off RBI single from Joe Oliver. Game 2 was the last World Series game ever played at Riverfront Stadium, and remains the most recent World Series game played in Cincinnati to date. When the series shifted to Oakland, the Reds blew out the Athletics again in Game 3 to take a commanding three-games-to-none series lead. In Game 4, Rijo, who was on three-days rest, along with Myers, helped preserve a one run Reds lead to complete the sweep and clinch the title. The Reds’ sweep of the Athletics extended their winning streak in World Series play to nine games, dating back to Game 7 of the 1975 World Series. Game 4 was the last World Series game ever played at Oakland Coliseum. The 1990 Athletics became the sixth 100+ win team to be swept in the postseason.

As of 2026, this is the last World Series appearance by either the Athletics or Reds, the last time that the World Series was won by either team from Ohio, and is Cincinnati’s second most recent victory in a playoff series. Afterwards, the Reds entered a slump, as the team would only make the postseason seven times since their last World Series win, only making it as far as the NLCS once in those seven appearances, in 1995, which they lost. This was the last championship of the four major North American sports leagues won by a team from Ohio until the Cleveland Cavaliers made and won the 2016 NBA Finals.

This was ultimately the Athletics' last World Series appearance during their time in Oakland, as the team would move to Las Vegas. After the World Series loss, the Athletics would continue to enjoy regular season success, but in the postseason, could only make it as far as the ALCS twice (1992, 2006), losing both.

== Broadcasting ==
This marked the first year of a four-year agreement with CBS to televise all postseason games nationally in the United States.
