= 2013 National League Wild Card Game =

2nd edition of Major League Baseball's National League Wild Card Game

	1	2	3	4	5	6	7	8	9	R	H	E
Cincinnati Reds	0	0	0	1	0	0	0	1	0	2	6	1
Pittsburgh Pirates	0	2	1	2	0	0	1	0	x	6	13	0
- Date: October 1, 2013, 8:07 p.m. (EDT)
- Venue: PNC Park
- City: Pittsburgh, Pennsylvania
- Managers: Dusty Baker (Cincinnati Reds); Clint Hurdle (Pittsburgh Pirates)
- Umpires: Lineup: HP: Joe West (crew chief); 1B: Dale Scott; 2B: Dan Iassogna; 3B: Rob Drake; LF: Tim Timmons; RF: Lance Barksdale
- Attendance: 40,487
- Ceremonial first pitch: Doug Drabek
- Television: TBS
- TV announcers: Ernie Johnson Jr., Ron Darling, Cal Ripken Jr., and Craig Sager
- Radio: ESPN
- Radio announcers: Dan Shulman and Orel Hershiser

The 2013 National League Wild Card Game was a play-in game during Major League Baseball's (MLB) 2013 postseason played between the National League's (NL) two wild card teams, the Cincinnati Reds and the Pittsburgh Pirates. It was held at PNC Park in Pittsburgh, Pennsylvania, on October 1, 2013. The Pirates won by a 6–2 score and advanced to play the St. Louis Cardinals in the NL Division Series. The game was televised on TBS, and was also broadcast on ESPN Radio.

The game marked the first postseason appearance by the Pirates since 1992 and the Pirates' victory gave the team their first postseason series win since the 1979 World Series. This was the third postseason appearance for the Reds in four seasons. It was the sixth postseason meeting of the Pirates-Reds rivalry (the others being in the NLCS in 1970, 1972, 1975, 1979, and 1990). Pirates manager Clint Hurdle made his first postseason appearance since competing in the 2007 World Series as manager of the Colorado Rockies, while Dusty Baker fell to 0–3 in postseason appearances as manager of the Reds, a position from which he was relieved three days after the loss. The loss continued the Reds' postseason win drought, active since the 1995 National League Division Series.

== Game results ==
=== Line score ===
October 1, 2013 8:06 pm (EDT) at PNC Park in Pittsburgh, Pennsylvania, 73 °F (23 °C), clear
Team	1	2	3	4	5	6	7	8	9	R	H	E
Cincinnati	0	0	0	1	0	0	0	1	0	2	6	1
Pittsburgh	0	2	1	2	0	0	1	0	X	6	13	0
WP: Francisco Liriano (1–0) LP: Johnny Cueto (0–1); Home runs: CIN: Shin-Soo Choo (1); PIT: Marlon Byrd (1), Russell Martin 2 (2); Attendance: 40,487; Boxscore

After a scoreless first inning and a half, the Pirates secured the first runs of the game with home runs by Marlon Byrd and Russell Martin in the bottom of the 2nd inning. Martin's home run came after Reds starting pitcher Johnny Cueto, having his name chanted mockingly by over 40,000 Pirates fans, dropped the baseball from the mound. Martin hit a home run on the next pitch. In the bottom of the third, Pedro Alvarez hit a sacrifice-fly to Shin-Soo Choo, which allowed Andrew McCutchen to score. In the top of the fourth, with Choo and Ryan Ludwick on base, Jay Bruce hit a groundball single to Pirates left-fielder Starling Marte, allowing Choo to score. In the bottom of the fourth, Marte and Neil Walker scored off RBI hits by Walker and Byrd, respectively. In the bottom of the 7th inning, Russell Martin hit another home run. The Reds could only further respond with a Choo home run off of Tony Watson. The Pirates would maintain their lead and go on to win, with Jason Grilli closing the game.
