= 1975 Major League Baseball postseason =

1975 Major League Baseball playoffs

Tournament details
- Dates: October 4–22, 1975
- Teams: 4

Final positions
- Champions: Cincinnati Reds (3rd title)
- Runners-up: Boston Red Sox

Tournament statistics
- Games played: 13
- Attendance: 584,526 (44,964 per game)
- Most HRs: Tony Pérez (CIN) (4)
- Most SBs: Joe Morgan (CIN) (6)
- Best ERA: Rawly Eastwick (CIN) (1.54)
- Most Ks (as pitcher): Don Gullett (CIN) & Luis Tiant (BOS) (35)

Awards
- MVP: Pete Rose (CIN)

The 1975 Major League Baseball postseason was the playoff tournament of Major League Baseball for the 1975 season. The winners of each division advance to the postseason and face each other in a League Championship Series to determine the pennant winners that face each other in the World Series.

In the American League, the Oakland Athletics made their fifth straight postseason appearance, and the Boston Red Sox made their first postseason appearance since 1967. This was Boston’s last postseason appearance until 1986.

In the National League, the Cincinnati Reds returned for the fourth time in the past six seasons, and the Pittsburgh Pirates returned for the fifth time in the past six seasons. This edition of the postseason would replicate itself in 1990, as all four teams from the 1975 postseason would return that year.

The playoffs began on October 4, 1975, and concluded on October 22, 1975, with the Cincinnati Reds defeating the Boston Red Sox in seven games in the 1975 World Series. It was the first title for the Reds since 1940, and their third overall.

== Teams ==
American League Teams National League Teams

The following teams qualified for the postseason:

=== American League ===
- Boston Red Sox – 95–65, AL East champions
- Oakland Athletics – 98–64, AL West champions

=== National League ===
- Pittsburgh Pirates – 92–69, NL East champions
- Cincinnati Reds – 108–54, NL West champions

== Playoff bracket ==
League Championship Series (ALCS, NLCS)
East	Boston	3
West	Oakland	0
East	Pittsburgh	0
West	Cincinnati	3

World Series
AL	Boston	3
NL	Cincinnati	4

== American League Championship Series ==
=== Oakland Athletics vs. Boston Red Sox ===
Boston won the series, 3–0.

Game	Date	Score	Location	Time	Attendance
1	October 4	Oakland Athletics – 1, Boston Red Sox – 7	Fenway Park	2:40	35,578
2	October 5	Oakland Athletics – 3, Boston Red Sox – 6	Fenway Park	2:27	35,578
3	October 7	Boston Red Sox – 5, Oakland Athletics – 3	Oakland-Alameda County Coliseum	2:30	49,358

This was the first postseason meeting between the Red Sox and Athletics. The Red Sox shockingly swept the three-time defending World Series champion Athletics to advance to the World Series for the first time since 1967 (in the process denying a rematch of the 1972 World Series between the Reds and Athletics).

Luis Tiant pitched a complete game for the Red Sox as they blew out the Athletics in Game 1. Carl Yastrzemski led the comeback effort for the Red Sox as they won by three runs to take a 2–0 series lead headed to Oakland. Rick Wise pitched seven solid innings and the Sox bullpen stopped a rally by the A’s to clinch the pennant. Game 3 was the first night game in ALCS history. This was the first playoff series win by the Red Sox since the 1918 World Series.

The Red Sox would win their next pennant in 1986 over the California Angels in seven games after trailing 3–1 in the series and being a strike away from elimination in Game 5, but they would come up short in the World Series.

The loss to the Red Sox marked the end of the Athletics’ dynasty. The Athletics would make it back to the ALCS in 1981, but were swept by the New York Yankees.

The Red Sox and Athletics would meet in the postseason again three more times - in the ALCS in 1988 and 1990, and the ALDS in 2003, with the Athletics sweeping the former two series, and the Red Sox winning the latter.

== National League Championship Series ==
=== Pittsburgh Pirates vs. Cincinnati Reds ===
Cincinnati won the series, 3–0.

Game	Date	Score	Location	Time	Attendance
1	October 4	Pittsburgh Pirates – 3, Cincinnati Reds – 8	Riverfront Stadium	3:00	54,633
2	October 5	Pittsburgh Pirates – 1, Cincinnati Reds – 6	Riverfront Stadium	2:51	54,752
3	October 7	Cincinnati Reds – 5, Pittsburgh Pirates – 3 (10)	Three Rivers Stadium	2:47	46,355

This was the third postseason meeting in the history of the Pirates-Reds rivalry (1970, 1972). The Reds swept the Pirates to advance to the World Series for the third time in five years (in the process denying a rematch of the 1903 World Series between the Pirates and Red Sox (who were then known as the Boston Americans)).

This series was not close - Don Gullett pitched a complete game as the Reds blew out the Pirates in Game 1, and Fred Norman and Rawly Eastwick held the Pirates' offense to just one run scored in Game 2 as the Reds went up 2–0 in the series headed to Pittsburgh. In Game 3, the Pirates held a 2–1 lead after seven innings, until Pete Rose hit a two-run home run in the top of the eighth to put the Reds ahead for good, effectively securing the pennant. Game 3 was the first NLCS game played at night.

The Reds returned to the NLCS the next year, and swept the Philadelphia Phillies en route to repeating as World Series champions.

The Pirates and Reds would meet again in the NLCS in 1979 and 1990, with the Pirates winning the former in a sweep and the Reds winning the latter in six games, with both teams going on to win their most recent championships.

== 1975 World Series ==
=== Boston Red Sox (AL) vs. Cincinnati Reds (NL) ===
Cincinnati won the series, 4–3.

Game	Date	Score	Location	Time	Attendance
1	October 11	Cincinnati Reds – 0, Boston Red Sox – 6	Fenway Park	2:27	35,205
2	October 12	Cincinnati Reds – 3, Boston Red Sox – 2	Fenway Park	2:38	35,205
3	October 14	Boston Red Sox – 5, Cincinnati Reds – 6 (10)	Riverfront Stadium	3:03	55,392
4	October 15	Boston Red Sox – 5, Cincinnati Reds – 4	Riverfront Stadium	2:52	55,667
5	October 16	Boston Red Sox – 2, Cincinnati Reds – 6	Riverfront Stadium	2:23	56,393
6	October 21†	Cincinnati Reds – 6, Boston Red Sox – 7 (12)	Fenway Park	4:01	35,205
7	October 22	Cincinnati Reds – 4, Boston Red Sox – 3	Fenway Park	2:52	35,205

†: postponed from October 18 due to rain

In what many consider to be one of the greatest World Series ever played, the Reds defeated the Red Sox in seven games in a back-and-forth series, winning their first championship since 1940.

Luis Tiant pitched a five-hit complete game shutout as the Red Sox took Game 1. The Reds took Game 2 by one run to tie the series despite using four different pitchers. When the series shifted to Cincinnati, the Reds narrowly took Game 3 thanks to a walk-off RBI from Joe Morgan in the bottom of the tenth. In Game 4, despite giving up four runs, Tiant pitched another complete game for the Red Sox on three-days rest as Boston evened the series. In Game 5, Don Gullett and closer Rawly Eastwick helped the Reds win by a 6–2 score to gain a 3–2 series lead going back to Fenway Park.

Game 6 of the series is widely regarded as one of the greatest games ever played in World Series history - Boston's Fred Lynn got the Red Sox an early lead in the bottom of the first inning with a three-run home run, and after four more innings, the Reds scored three runs to tie the game at three runs each. The Reds then scored three more runs in the top of the seventh and eighth to take a 6–3 lead, then Boston's Bernie Carbo hit another three-run home run to tie the game in the bottom of the eighth. Then, no runs were scored in the ninth, tenth, or eleventh innings of play. In the bottom of the twelfth, Carlton Fisk hit one of the most famous walk-off home runs in postseason history to force a decisive seventh game.

In Game 7, the Red Sox were leading 3-2 in the bottom of the seventh and were seven outs away from the championship, but the lead would not hold, as Pete Rose hit a two-out RBI single to tie the game. Then, the Reds took the lead for good in the top of the ninth thanks to a single by Morgan which scored Ken Griffey. Will McEnaney pitched a one-two-three ninth to capture the Reds’ first championship in 35 years. This was Rose’s first World Series championship, and he was named World Series MVP.

The Reds would go on to repeat as World Series champions the next year, sweeping the New York Yankees.

The Red Sox's collapse in Game 7 contributed to the popular mythology of the Curse of the Bambino, which had been extended to 57 years. The Red Sox returned to the World Series in 1986, but they lost the New York Mets in seven games after being a strike away from the championship twice in Game 6, and ten outs away in Game 7. They would eventually end the curse in 2004, where they swept the St. Louis Cardinals to end their 86-year championship drought.

== Broadcasting ==
This was the last year that NBC televised all postseason games nationally in the United States. Beginning in 1976, the postseason coverage would be split between NBC and ABC.

Each team's local broadcaster also televised coverage of LCS games.
