= Pirates–Reds rivalry =

Major League Baseball rivalry

- Pittsburgh Pirates Cincinnati Reds
- Location: Eastern United States
- First meeting: May 2, 1882; Bank Street Grounds, Cincinnati, Ohio; Alleghenys 10, Red Stockings 9
- Latest meeting: August 2, 2026; Great American Ball Park, Cincinnati, Ohio; Reds 10, Pirates 2
- Next meeting: March 29, 2027; Great American Ball Park, Cincinnati, Ohio
- Stadiums: Pirates: PNC Park; Reds: Great American Ball Park

Statistics
- Total meetings: 2,540
- All-time series: Pirates, 1,269–1,253–18 (.503)
- Regular season series: Pirates, 1,261–1,240–18 (.504)
- Postseason results: Reds, 13–8 (.619)
- Largest victory: Pirates, 23–4 (April 27, 1912); Red Stockings, 27–5 (September 12, 1883)
- Longest win streak: Pirates, 20 (May 31, 1937–April 24, 1938); Redlegs, 15 (July 22, 1956–May 19, 1957)
- Current win streak: Reds, 1

Post-season history
- 1970 NL Championship Series: Reds won, 3–0; 1972 NL Championship Series: Reds won, 3–2; 1975 NL Championship Series: Reds won, 3–0; 1979 NL Championship Series: Pirates won, 3–0; 1990 NL Championship Series: Reds won, 4–2; 2013 NL Wild Card Game: Pirates won

Locations of the Pittsburgh Pirates and Cincinnati Reds

The Pirates–Reds rivalry is a Major League Baseball (MLB) National League divisional rivalry played between the Pittsburgh Pirates and the Cincinnati Reds.

The Pirates and Reds are both members of the National League (NL) Central division. Both teams have been active rivals for more than 135 seasons, dating back well into the infancy of the MLB.

== Background ==
The Pirates and Reds were both founded in 1881 in the American Association, beginning play in 1882, and playing each other for five seasons. The Pirates moved into the National League in 1887, ceasing play between the two teams. The Reds moved into the National League in 1890, resuming play against the Pirates which continues to today. The Pirates have won 5 World Series Championships in 1909, 1925, 1960, 1971, and 1979, and 9 NL Pennants. The Reds have also won 5 World Series Championships in 1919, 1940, 1975, 1976, 1990, and 9 NL Pennants. Both teams have met 6 times in the postseason; including 5 meetings in the NLCS. From 1969 to 1993, the Pirates were a member of the NL East until the league's realignment in 1993 moved them to the newly formed Central Division. Meanwhile; the Reds were previously members of the NL West until the realignment placed them in the same division as Pittsburgh in 1993. Most recently; both teams have met in the 2013 National League Wild Card Game.

As of the end of the 2026 season, the Pirates currently lead the regular season rivalry 1,261–1,240–18; however, the Reds lead in postseason wins 13–8.

== History ==
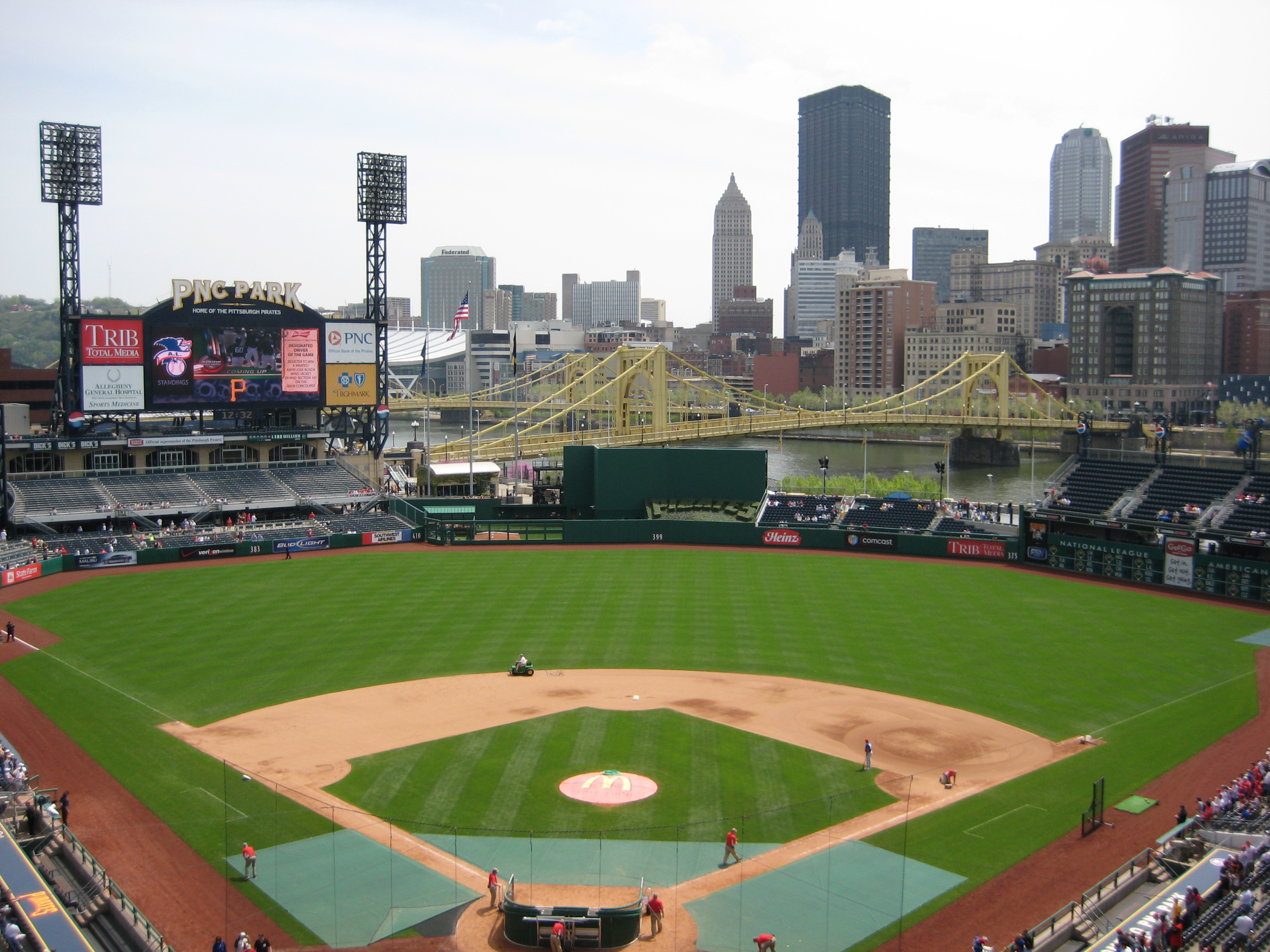
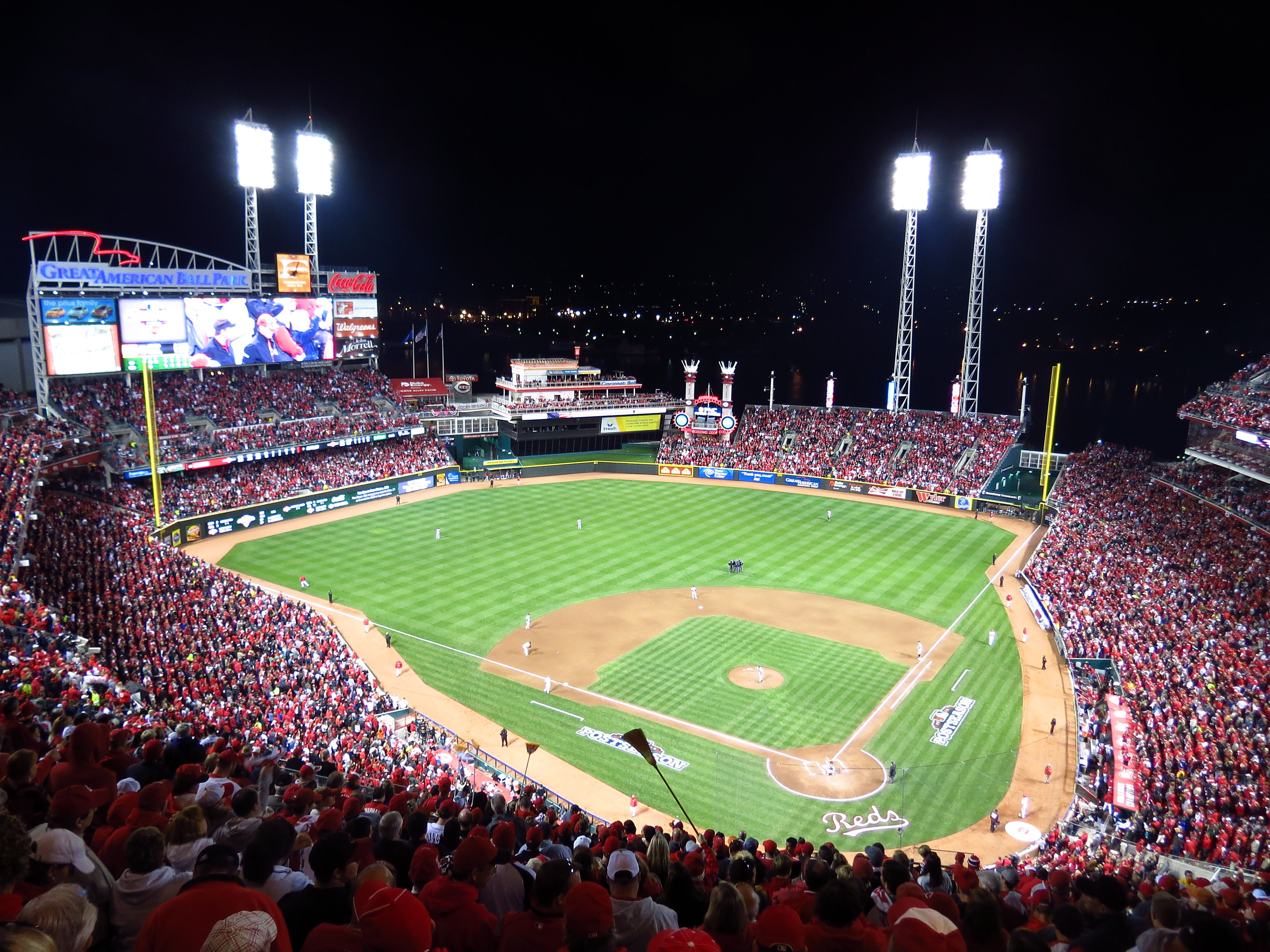
PNC Park (left), the home of the Pirates, and Great American Ballpark (right), home of the Reds.

=== 1900s to 1960s: Early History ===
During the infancy of the National League, both teams struggled out of the gate. The Pirates saw most of their roster decimated as most had defected to the Players' League. Pittsburgh would manage brief periods of success headed into the new century; including three straight NL Pennants from 1901 to 1903 and a World Series victory in 1909.

Cincinnati fared much worse, failing to qualify for the postseason every season until 1919. Even then, the team arguably only won the 1919 World Series against the heavily-favorited Chicago White Sox because of the Black Sox Scandal. While the Reds weren't involved in the scandal, it tainted the legitimacy of their first World Series championship.

The Pirates managed to stay competitive, culminating in another World Series title in 1925. Both clubs managed levels of success at various times, though they often avoided one another heading into the postseason. The Reds finally managed their own turn of success with a World Series victory in 1940 whilst the Pirates were in the midst of a playoff drought for nearly two decades. Though, by the end of the 1950s, the Pirates briefly returned to success with another World Series victory in 1960, the Reds managed to win the pennant the following season; narrowly beating out the Los Angeles Dodgers in the process, though the Yankees prevailed to win the Championship in five games. Both teams would soon spend the duration of the 1960s in a rebuild; however, by the turn of the decade, the competition quickly heated up.

=== 1970s: Fierce NLCS Matchups ===
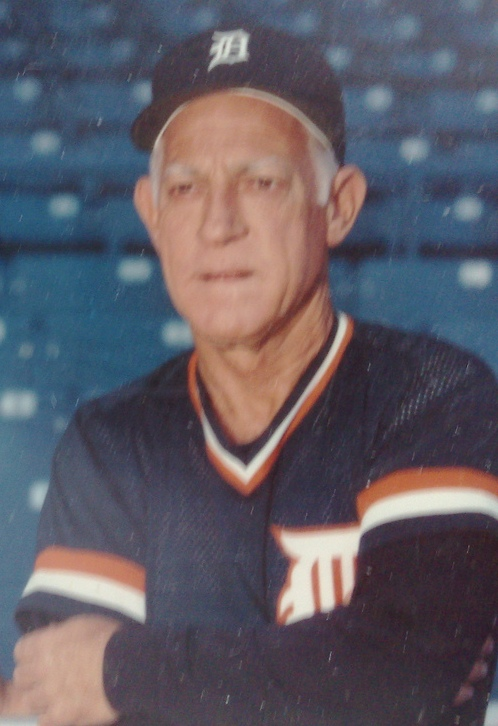
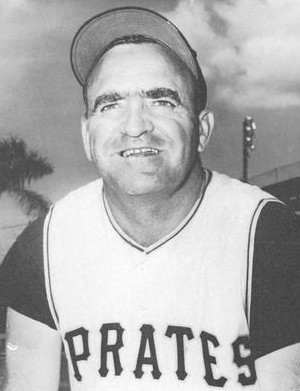
Sparky Anderson (left) and Danny Murtaugh (right) were both pivotal in both teams battling for success during the 1970s.

==== 1970 NLCS ====
In June 1970, both the Reds and Pirates moved into new ballparks; The Reds left Crosley Field for Riverfront Stadium in June, while the Pirates left Forbes Field for Three Rivers Stadium. The Pirates would begin a string of winning the NL East for 5 of the first 6 seasons that decade, the Reds would win the NL West 4 of the first 6 seasons the same decade. On July 16, 1970, the Pittsburgh Pirates began play after the All-Star break by opening new Three Rivers Stadium against the rival Reds. Cincinnati's Tony Perez hit the park's first home run, and Willie Stargell later homered for the Bucs. The contest was decided on a 9th inning RBI single from Lee May to give the Reds a 3-2 decision. The two teams found themselves on a postseason collision course for the first time as the Pirates were armed with players such as all-star right fielder Roberto Clemente, star slugger left fielder Willie Stargell, and pitcher Steve Blass; they were armed to clash directly with the Reds, who by this season had armed a deadly batting lineup featuring such legends as Johnny Bench, Pete Rose, Tony Pérez, and Joe Morgan. Despite the showing of Pittsburgh's batting lineup; the Reds won the series in a sweep.

Following the loss in the NLCS; the Pirates managed to beat the San Francisco Giants in 4 games en route to winning the 1971 World Series over the Baltimore Orioles.

==== 1972 NLCS ====
The two clubs found themselves in each other's way once again during the 1972 NLCS. The Pirates prevailed in game 1 during a 5–1 victory in Pittsburgh. The Reds found themselves unable to overcome the dominant pitching from Steve Blass as they would go on to leave 11 baserunners with only a sole run in the first inning. Frustrations would run high for Cincinnati as manager Sparky Anderson would be ejected during the fourth inning. Game 2 saw the Reds bite back with a vengeance as they opened the first inning with 4 runs. The Pirates struggled mightily up until the fourth inning in which they'd manage to claw back with a run per inning up until the eighth. However; a Joe Morgan home run guaranteed the victory as Reds' pitcher Tom Hall locked up Pittsburgh's hitters to end the game. Game 3 saw a low-scoring affair with the Pirates holding on for a 3–2 victory by the end of the night in Cincinnati. Game 4 saw the Reds even the series with a blowout victory over the Pirates as Pittsburgh only managed a single run in the seventh inning while the Reds achieved 7 runs off of a panicked Pittsburgh bullpen. Game 5 began with a rain delay for 90 minutes. The Pirates fought hard with a 3–2 lead coming out of the fifth inning, however; the Reds would rob them of the victory with 2 crushing runs as Pirates' reliever Bob Moose tossed a wild pitch with George Foster on third, culminating in Hal McCrae scoring a 2 run homer during the next at bat, ending the series. This would be the final game ever played for Pirates' Hall-of-Famer Roberto Clemente as he would be killed in a plane crash after volunteering for earthquake relief in Nicaragua in December.

==== 1975 NLCS ====
Once again both teams met in the NLCS but the series proved to be largely uneventful as the Reds dominated the series with a 3-game sweep, though the Pirates held on to force game 3 into 10 innings, they would prove not to be a match for Cincinnati's hitters as they would end the series with 2 runs in the tenth.

==== 1979 NLCS ====
Nearing the end of their dynasty as the Big Red Machine, Cincinnati managed to pull ahead of a weak NL West en route to another matchup against Pittsburgh. Meanwhile; Pittsburgh pulled through 2 games ahead of the Montreal Expos to secure the NL East. The Pirates proved to have the upper hand this series as they would go onto decimate the Reds in a humiliating sweep, on their own way to win the 1979 World Series over the Orioles once again.

=== 1980s regression ===
The Pirates and Reds both saw a sharp regression from their heyday in the 1970s, ironically for the Reds, they finished with the league's best record in 1981 heading into the all-star break before a player strike suspended the season. The Reds would fail to make the postseason as a result of the losses to the roster. The Pirates had sunken deep into mediocrity as they would fail to post a winning record until 1990, despite posting a winning record; the Reds finished in second place every season from 1985 to 1989, failing to make the postseason.

=== Early 1990s: Return to competition/1990 NLCS ===
The Pirates began the 1990s firing on all cylinders led by the strength of All Stars: Barry Bonds, Bobby Bonilla, Neal Heaton, and Doug Drabek. The Reds had quickly become the surprise of the league, armed with their own dominant roster under new manager Lou Pinella, they boasted such talents as Eric Davis, José Rijo, Randy Myers, and Chris Sabo they dominated the division with a 5-game lead over the rival Los Angeles Dodgers.

==== 1990 NLCS ====
Both teams were set to square off in the 1990 NLCS as the Pirates managed to dominate a weak NL East to 95 wins. The resulting series saw the Reds' famed Nasty Boys lock up the Pirates' usually dominant hitting core as the two teams combined for a low-scoring 6-game series, culminating in the Reds pulling away with the win, and eventually the 1990 World Series over the Oakland Athletics in a sweep.

=== 1993–2000: Divisional Realignment/Decline ===
Following the 1990 season, the Reds declined mightily under the notoriously awful ownership of then-owner Marge Schott, the team saw multiple stars leave in free agency or fell victim to bad trades. Meanwhile; the Pirates managed two appearances in the NLCS in 1991 and 1992, ending in a loss to the Atlanta Braves both times. Due to the expansion of the league in 1993; the Reds and Pirates were both consolidated into the newly formed NL Central, turning their once heated playoff rivalry into a divisional battle. However; The Reds would only put up 2 winning seasons in 1994 and 1995, with a player strike and a sweep from the Braves in the 1995 NLCS sealing their decline. The Pirates would not manage a single winning season from 1993 to 2013. Despite a 1999 Wild Card tiebreaker appearance against the New York Mets, the Reds would not post a winning season from 2001 to 2009.

=== 2010s: Return to Relevance ===
Following years of mediocrity and bad management on both sides, Cincinnati would manage a playoff appearance after 8 mediocre seasons, only to be swept by the Philadelphia Phillies. The Reds' new manager Dusty Baker would also guide the team to an appearance in the 2012 NLDS.

==== 2013 NL Wild Card Game ====
The Pirates miraculously returned to playoff competition in 2013 as they finished second in the division with a 94–68 record, their first winning season since 1992. The Reds finished four games behind the Pirates, however; due to a weak National League season, they managed to secure the lowest remaining wild card berth; set to face the Pirates once again for the first time in 23 seasons. Led by star outfielder Andrew McCutchen, the Pirates slammed out 5 runs off of Reds' starting pitcher Johnny Cueto by the end of the fourth inning while the Reds would struggle to manage one by the end of the fifth. By the seventh inning, the Pirates had run away with a 6–1 lead as Cincinnati's bats went cold the majority of the game. The Reds managed another run in the eighth inning but failed to perform anything of note for the remainder of the game. The Pirates advanced on to play the St. Louis Cardinals in the NLDS, but fell in 5 games.

=== 2015–2024: Decline for Both ===
The Pirates would manage two more postseason appearances following their run to the 2013 NLDS, they would lose to the World Series champion San Francisco Giants in a crushing 8–0 loss in 2014 and would go on to suffer another shutout loss to the Chicago Cubs 4–0 in 2015. Meanwhile, the Reds fired Dusty Baker on October 4, 2013, and Cincinnati has failed to post a winning record since 2013. Numerous star players such as Andrew McCutchen, Starling Marte, Gerrit Cole, and Mark Melancon all left the Pirates in free agency. During the 2019 season; both teams would engage in a massive brawl after Pirates' pitcher Keone Kela had thrown at Reds' batter Derek Dietrich in the seventh inning, the umpires would later give Kela a warning as Reds' star Joey Votto engaged in insulting the Pirates' dugout. Newly acquired outfielder Yasiel Puig would later go up to bat for the Reds before a controversial strike call from the umpire led to an argument between Puig and the home plate umpire. Frustrated with the call, Puig later threw down his helmet after several minutes of shouting, ending the inning. As Reds' pitcher Amir Garrett had taken the mound and had also engaged into a shouting match with the Pirates dugout after throwing at Pirates batter Chris Archer. After several minutes of shouting at the Pirates' players, Garrett charged the Pittsburgh dugout along with Puig; culminating in a massive brawl clearing both benches. Following the fight, Puig and Garrett would both be ejected from the game. In total: six players would be suspended a combined total of 40 games, including Puig and Garrett. An hour prior to the Pirates' final game of the 2019 season, manager Clint Hurdle was fired after eight seasons. Since 2015, only the Reds have made the postseason, that being the 16-team postseason in 2020.

== Season-by-season results ==
Pirates vs. Reds Season-by-Season Results
1880s (Red Stockings, 42–33–1)

Season	Season series		at Pittsburgh Alleghenys	at Cincinnati Red Stockings	Overall series	Notes
1882	Red Stockings	10‍–‍6	Red Stockings, 4‍–‍3	Red Stockings, 6‍–‍3	Red Stockings; 10‍–‍6	Red Stockings win 1882 American Association pennant
1883	Red Stockings	8‍–‍6	Alleghenys, 4‍–‍3	Red Stockings, 5‍–‍2	Red Stockings; 18‍–‍12	Alleghenys open new Exposition Park after original burns in a fire.
1884	Red Stockings	8‍–‍1‍–‍1	Red Stockings, 3‍–‍1‍–‍1	Red Stockings, 5‍–‍0	Red Stockings; 26‍–‍13‍–‍1	Alleghenys begin play at Recreation Park; Red Stockings open American Park.
1885	Red Stockings	9‍–‍7	Alleghenys, 5‍–‍3	Red Stockings, 6‍–‍2	Red Stockings; 35‍–‍20‍–‍1	
1886	Alleghenys	13‍–‍7	Alleghenys, 7‍–‍3	Alleghenys, 6‍–‍4	Red Stockings; 42‍–‍33‍–‍1	Alleghenys' last season in the American Association, before switching to the National League. The Alleghenys and Red Stockings would not play each other for the following three seasons.

1890s (Reds, 75–66–5)

Season	Season series		at Pittsburgh Alleghenys/Pirates	at Cincinnati Reds	Overall series	Notes
1890	Reds	16‍–‍4	Tie, 1‍–‍1	Reds, 15‍–‍3	Reds; 58‍–‍37‍–‍1	Red Stockings switch to the National League, resuming play between the Alleghenys and newly renamed "Reds". Reds' American Park renamed League Park
1891	Tie	10‍–‍10	Reds, 7‍–‍3	Pirates, 7‍–‍3	Reds; 68‍–‍47‍–‍1	Alleghenys rename to "Pittsburgh Pirates" following the accusedly "piratical" acquisition of Lou Bierbauer. Pirates open another new Exposition Park
1892	Pirates	9‍–‍5	Pirates, 6‍–‍2	Tie, 3‍–‍3	Reds; 73‍–‍56‍–‍1	
1893	Pirates	9‍–‍3	Pirates, 4‍–‍2	Pirates, 5‍–‍1	Reds; 76‍–‍65‍–‍1	
1894	Pirates	7‍–‍5	Pirates, 5‍–‍1	Reds, 4‍–‍2	Reds; 81‍–‍72‍–‍1	
1895	Pirates	8‍–‍4‍–‍1	Pirates, 4‍–‍2‍–‍1	Pirates, 4‍–‍2	Reds; 85‍–‍80‍–‍2	
1896	Pirates	7‍–‍5	Tie, 3‍–‍3	Pirates, 4‍–‍2	Reds; 90‍–‍87‍–‍2	
1897	Pirates	7‍–‍5‍–‍1	Pirates, 4‍–‍2	Tie, 3‍–‍3‍–‍1	Reds; 95‍–‍94‍–‍3	
1898	Reds	12‍–‍2	Reds, 6‍–‍1	Reds, 6‍–‍1	Reds; 107‍–‍96‍–‍3	
1899	Reds	10‍–‍3‍–‍3	Reds, 5‍–‍1‍–‍1	Reds, 5‍–‍2‍–‍2	Reds; 117‍–‍99‍–‍6	

1900s (Pirates, 132–81–4)

Season	Season series		at Pittsburgh Pirates	at Cincinnati Reds	Overall series	Notes
1900	Reds	12‍–‍8	Reds, 8‍–‍2	Pirates, 6‍–‍4	Reds; 129‍–‍107‍–‍6	Pirates lose 1900 Chronicle-Telegraph Cup
1901	Pirates	13‍–‍7	Pirates, 7‍–‍3	Pirates, 6‍–‍4	Reds; 136‍–‍120‍–‍6	Pirates win 1901 National League pennant
1902	Pirates	15‍–‍5	Pirates, 8‍–‍2	Pirates, 7‍–‍3	Reds; 141‍–‍135‍–‍6	After partially burning down, Reds open the Palace of the Fans on the site of the former League Park. Pirates win 1902 National League pennant
1903	Pirates	16‍–‍4	Pirates, 7‍–‍3	Pirates, 9‍–‍1	Pirates; 151‍–‍145‍–‍6	Pirates take a 145‍–‍144 lead on July 26 in the series, a lead they would never relinquish. Pirates lose the inaugural 1903 World Series
1904	Tie	11‍–‍11‍–‍2	Pirates, 7‍–‍5	Reds, 6‍–‍4‍–‍2	Pirates; 162‍–‍156‍–‍8	
1905	Pirates	13‍–‍9	Pirates, 8‍–‍3	Reds, 6‍–‍5	Pirates; 175‍–‍165‍–‍8	
1906	Pirates	14‍–‍8‍–‍1	Pirates, 7‍–‍4‍–‍1	Pirates, 7‍–‍4	Pirates; 189‍–‍173‍–‍9	
1907	Pirates	12‍–‍10‍–‍1	Pirates, 6‍–‍4	Tie, 6‍–‍6‍–‍1	Pirates; 201‍–‍183‍–‍10	
1908	Pirates	14‍–‍8	Pirates, 7‍–‍4	Pirates, 7‍–‍4	Pirates; 215‍–‍191‍–‍10	
1909	Pirates	16‍–‍7	Pirates, 9‍–‍3	Pirates, 7‍–‍4	Pirates; 231‍–‍198‍–‍10	Pirates open Forbes Field; Pirates win 1909 World Series

1910s (Pirates, 109–102–4)

Season	Season series		at Pittsburgh Pirates	at Cincinnati Reds	Overall series	Notes
1910	Pirates	12‍–‍10	Pirates, 6‍–‍5	Pirates, 6‍–‍5	Pirates; 243‍–‍208‍–‍10	
1911	Pirates	12‍–‍10‍–‍1	Reds, 6‍–‍5‍–‍1	Pirates, 7‍–‍4	Pirates; 255‍–‍218‍–‍11	
1912	Tie	11‍–‍11	Pirates, 8‍–‍3	Reds, 8‍–‍3	Pirates; 266‍–‍229‍–‍11	Reds open Redland Field on site of previous Palace of the Fans.
1913	Pirates	13‍–‍8‍–‍1	Pirates, 7‍–‍4‍–‍1	Pirates, 6‍–‍4	Pirates; 279‍–‍237‍–‍12	
1914	Pirates	14‍–‍8‍–‍1	Pirates, 8‍–‍3	Pirates, 6‍–‍5‍–‍1	Pirates; 293‍–‍245‍–‍13	
1915	Reds	12‍–‍10‍–‍1	Reds, 7‍–‍4‍–‍1	Pirates, 6‍–‍5	Pirates; 303‍–‍257‍–‍14	
1916	Reds	13‍–‍9	Reds, 6‍–‍5	Reds, 7‍–‍4	Pirates; 312‍–‍270‍–‍14	
1917	Reds	12‍–‍10	Pirates, 7‍–‍4	Reds, 8‍–‍3	Pirates; 322‍–‍282‍–‍14	
1918	Pirates	12‍–‍4	Pirates, 7‍–‍1	Pirates, 5‍–‍3	Pirates; 334‍–‍286‍–‍14	
1919	Reds	14‍–‍6	Reds, 6‍–‍4	Reds, 8‍–‍2	Pirates; 340‍–‍300‍–‍14	Reds win 1919 World Series in infamous Black Sox Scandal

1920s (Pirates, 118–101–1)

Season	Season series		at Pittsburgh Pirates	at Cincinnati Reds	Overall series	Notes
1920	Reds	12‍–‍10	Pirates, 6‍–‍5	Reds, 7‍–‍4	Pirates; 350‍–‍312‍–‍14	
1921	Pirates	14‍–‍8	Pirates, 8‍–‍3	Pirates, 6‍–‍5	Pirates; 364‍–‍320‍–‍14	
1922	Tie	11‍–‍11‍–‍1	Pirates, 6‍–‍5	Reds, 6‍–‍5‍–‍1	Pirates; 375‍–‍331‍–‍15	
1923	Pirates	14‍–‍8	Pirates, 8‍–‍3	Pirates, 6‍–‍5	Pirates; 389‍–‍339‍–‍15	
1924	Reds	12‍–‍10	Pirates, 6‍–‍5	Reds, 7‍–‍4	Pirates; 399‍–‍351‍–‍15	
1925	Pirates	13‍–‍8	Pirates, 8‍–‍3	Tie, 5‍–‍5	Pirates; 412‍–‍359‍–‍15	Pirates win 1925 World Series
1926	Reds	13‍–‍9	Tie, 6‍–‍6	Reds, 7‍–‍3	Pirates; 421‍–‍372‍–‍15	
1927	Pirates	14‍–‍8	Pirates, 6‍–‍5	Pirates, 8‍–‍3	Pirates; 435‍–‍380‍–‍15	Pirates lose 1927 World Series
1928	Reds	12‍–‍10	Pirates, 6‍–‍5	Reds, 7‍–‍4	Pirates; 445‍–‍392‍–‍15	
1929	Pirates	13‍–‍9	Pirates, 6‍–‍5	Pirates, 7‍–‍4	Pirates; 458‍–‍401‍–‍15	

1930s (Pirates, 140–79)

Season	Season series		at Pittsburgh Pirates	at Cincinnati Reds	Overall series	Notes
1930	Pirates	14‍–‍8	Pirates, 7‍–‍4	Pirates, 7‍–‍4	Pirates; 472‍–‍409‍–‍15	
1931	Pirates	16‍–‍6	Pirates, 10‍–‍1	Pirates, 6‍–‍5	Pirates; 488‍–‍415‍–‍15	
1932	Pirates	14‍–‍8	Pirates, 7‍–‍4	Pirates, 7‍–‍4	Pirates; 502‍–‍423‍–‍15	
1933	Pirates	15‍–‍7	Pirates, 7‍–‍3	Pirates, 8‍–‍4	Pirates; 517‍–‍430‍–‍15	
1934	Pirates	15‍–‍7	Pirates, 8‍–‍3	Pirates, 7‍–‍4	Pirates; 532‍–‍437‍–‍15	Reds' Redland Field renamed Crosley Field
1935	Pirates	13‍–‍8	Pirates, 6‍–‍5	Pirates, 7‍–‍3	Pirates; 545‍–‍445‍–‍15	
1936	Pirates	14‍–‍8	Pirates, 9‍–‍2	Reds, 6‍–‍5	Pirates; 559‍–‍453‍–‍15	
1937	Pirates	21‍–‍1	Pirates, 12‍–‍0	Pirates, 9‍–‍1	Pirates; 580‍–‍454‍–‍15	
1938	Pirates	12‍–‍10	Pirates, 8‍–‍3	Reds, 7‍–‍4	Pirates; 592‍–‍464‍–‍15	
1939	Reds	16‍–‍6	Reds, 6‍–‍5	Reds, 10‍–‍1	Pirates; 598‍–‍480‍–‍15	Reds lose 1939 World Series

1940s (Reds, 115–104–1)

Season	Season series		at Pittsburgh Pirates	at Cincinnati Reds	Overall series	Notes
1940	Reds	16‍–‍6	Reds, 6‍–‍5	Reds, 10‍–‍1	Pirates; 604‍–‍496‍–‍15	Reds win 1940 World Series
1941	Reds	12‍–‍10	Pirates, 6‍–‍5	Reds, 7‍–‍4	Pirates; 614‍–‍508‍–‍15	
1942	Reds	12‍–‍9‍–‍1	Reds, 7‍–‍3‍–‍1	Pirates, 6‍–‍5	Pirates; 623‍–‍520‍–‍16	
1943	Pirates	13‍–‍9	Pirates, 8‍–‍3	Reds, 6‍–‍5	Pirates; 636‍–‍529‍–‍16	
1944	Reds	12‍–‍10	Reds, 6‍–‍5	Reds, 6‍–‍5	Pirates; 646‍–‍541‍–‍16	
1945	Pirates	12‍–‍10	Reds, 6‍–‍5	Pirates, 7‍–‍4	Pirates; 658‍–‍551‍–‍16	
1946	Reds	13‍–‍9	Pirates, 6‍–‍5	Reds, 8‍–‍3	Pirates; 667‍–‍564‍–‍16	
1947	Reds	13‍–‍9	Pirates, 6‍–‍5	Reds, 8‍–‍3	Pirates; 676‍–‍577‍–‍16	
1948	Pirates	13‍–‍9	Pirates, 7‍–‍4	Pirates, 6‍–‍5	Pirates; 689‍–‍586‍–‍16	
1949	Pirates	13‍–‍9	Pirates, 6‍–‍5	Pirates, 7‍–‍4	Pirates; 702‍–‍595‍–‍16	

1950s (Reds/Redlegs, 134–86–1)

Season	Season series		at Pittsburgh Pirates	at Cincinnati Reds/Redlegs	Overall series	Notes
1950	Reds	12‍–‍10	Pirates, 8‍–‍3	Reds, 9‍–‍2	Pirates; 712‍–‍607‍–‍16	
1951	Reds	12‍–‍10‍–‍1	Reds, 6‍–‍5‍–‍1	Reds, 6‍–‍5	Pirates; 722‍–‍619‍–‍17	
1952	Reds	16‍–‍6	Reds, 8‍–‍3	Reds, 8‍–‍3	Pirates; 728‍–‍635‍–‍17	
1953	Redlegs	15‍–‍7	Redlegs, 8‍–‍3	Redlegs, 7‍–‍4	Pirates; 735‍–‍650‍–‍17	The Reds rename as the "Cincinnati Redlegs"
1954	Redlegs	15‍–‍7	Redlegs, 6‍–‍5	Redlegs, 9‍–‍2	Pirates; 742‍–‍665‍–‍17	
1955	Redlegs	14‍–‍8	Redlegs, 6‍–‍5	Redlegs, 8‍–‍3	Pirates; 750‍–‍679‍–‍17	
1956	Redlegs	17‍–‍5	Redlegs, 10‍–‍1	Redlegs, 7‍–‍4	Pirates; 755‍–‍696‍–‍17	
1957	Redlegs	14‍–‍8	Pirates, 6‍–‍5	Redlegs, 9‍–‍2	Pirates; 763‍–‍710‍–‍17	
1958	Pirates	12‍–‍10	Pirates, 8‍–‍3	Redlegs, 7‍–‍4	Pirates; 775‍–‍720‍–‍17	
1959	Pirates	13‍–‍9	Pirates, 10‍–‍1	Reds, 8‍–‍3	Pirates; 788‍–‍729‍–‍17	The Redlegs name reverts to "Cincinnati Reds"

1960s (Pirates, 92–90–1)

Season	Season series		at Pittsburgh Pirates	at Cincinnati Reds	Overall series	Notes
1960	Pirates	16‍–‍6	Pirates, 8‍–‍3	Pirates, 8‍–‍3	Pirates; 804‍–‍735‍–‍17	Pirates win 1960 World Series
1961	Tie	11‍–‍11	Pirates, 7‍–‍4	Reds, 7‍–‍4	Pirates; 815‍–‍746‍–‍17	Reds lose 1961 World Series
1962	Reds	13‍–‍5	Reds, 5‍–‍4	Reds, 8‍–‍1	Pirates; 820‍–‍759‍–‍17	
1963	Reds	11‍–‍7	Reds, 5‍–‍4	Reds, 6‍–‍3	Pirates; 827‍–‍770‍–‍17	
1964	Pirates	10‍–‍8	Pirates, 5‍–‍4	Pirates, 5‍–‍4	Pirates; 837‍–‍778‍–‍17	
1965	Pirates	10‍–‍8	Pirates, 5‍–‍4	Pirates, 5‍–‍4	Pirates; 847‍–‍786‍–‍17	
1966	Pirates	10‍–‍8	Pirates, 6‍–‍3	Reds, 5‍–‍4	Pirates; 857‍–‍794‍–‍17	
1967	Reds	10‍–‍8	Pirates, 5‍–‍4	Reds, 6‍–‍3	Pirates; 865‍–‍804‍–‍17	
1968	Reds	10‍–‍8‍–‍1	Reds, 7‍–‍2	Pirates, 6‍–‍3‍–‍1	Pirates; 873‍–‍814‍–‍18	
1969	Pirates	7‍–‍5	Pirates, 4‍–‍2	Tie, 3‍–‍3	Pirates; 880‍–‍819‍–‍18	MLB's expansion and realignment place the Pirates in the NL East and Reds in the NL West. New division alignment shortens meetings from 18 to 12 games.

1970s (Reds, 74–59)

Season	Season series		at Pittsburgh Pirates	at Cincinnati Reds	Overall series	Notes
1970	Reds	8‍–‍4	Tie, 3‍–‍3	Reds, 5‍–‍1	Pirates; 884‍–‍827‍–‍18	Pirates open Three Rivers Stadium; Reds open Riverfront Stadium; Reds lose 1970 World Series
1970 NLCS	Reds	3‍–‍0	Reds, 2‍–‍0	Reds, 1‍–‍0	Pirates; 884‍–‍830‍–‍18	First meeting in the postseason. Reds sweep in three games. Reds proceed to lose World Series.
1971	Pirates	7‍–‍5	Pirates, 5‍–‍1	Reds, 4‍–‍2	Pirates; 891‍–‍835‍–‍18	Pirates win 1971 World Series
1972	Reds	8‍–‍4	Reds, 4‍–‍2	Reds, 4‍–‍2	Pirates; 895‍–‍843‍–‍18	Reds lose 1972 World Series
1972 NLCS	Reds	3‍–‍2	Tie, 1‍–‍1	Reds, 2‍–‍1	Pirates; 897‍–‍846‍–‍18	Second meeting in the postseason. Reds proceed to lose World Series.
1973	Reds	7‍–‍5	Tie, 3‍–‍3	Reds, 4‍–‍2	Pirates; 902‍–‍853‍–‍18	
1974	Reds	8‍–‍4	Reds, 5‍–‍1	Tie, 3‍–‍3	Pirates; 906‍–‍861‍–‍18	
1975	Tie	6‍–‍6	Pirates, 4‍–‍2	Reds, 4‍–‍2	Pirates; 912‍–‍867‍–‍18	Reds win 1975 World Series
1975 NLCS	Reds	3‍–‍0	Reds, 1‍–‍0	Reds, 2‍–‍0	Pirates; 912‍–‍870‍–‍18	Third meeting in the postseason. Reds sweep in three games. Reds proceed to win World Series.
1976	Reds	8‍–‍4	Reds, 5‍–‍1	Tie, 3‍–‍3	Pirates; 916‍–‍878‍–‍18	Reds win 1976 World Series
1977	Pirates	9‍–‍3	Pirates, 6‍–‍0	Tie, 3‍–‍3	Pirates; 925‍–‍881‍–‍18	
1978	Pirates	7‍–‍4	Pirates, 4‍–‍2	Pirates, 3‍–‍2	Pirates; 932‍–‍885‍–‍18	
1979	Reds	8‍–‍4	Reds, 5‍–‍1	Tie, 3‍–‍3	Pirates; 936‍–‍893‍–‍18	Pirates win 1979 World Series
1979 NLCS	Pirates	3‍–‍0	Pirates, 1‍–‍0	Pirates, 2‍–‍0	Pirates; 939‍–‍893‍–‍18	Fourth meeting in the postseason. Pirates sweep in three games. First Pirates series win. Pirates proceed to win World Series.

1980s (Reds, 64–50)

Season	Season series		at Pittsburgh Pirates	at Cincinnati Reds	Overall series	Notes
1980	Tie	6‍–‍6	Reds, 5‍–‍1	Pirates, 5‍–‍1	Pirates; 945‍–‍899‍–‍18	
1981	Reds	4‍–‍2	Reds, 3‍–‍0	Pirates, 2‍–‍1	Pirates; 947‍–‍903‍–‍18	Strike-shortened season
1982	Pirates	8‍–‍4	Tie, 3‍–‍3	Pirates, 5‍–‍1	Pirates; 955‍–‍907‍–‍18	
1983	Tie	6‍–‍6	Reds, 4‍–‍2	Pirates, 4‍–‍2	Pirates; 961‍–‍913‍–‍18	
1984	Reds	7‍–‍5	Pirates, 4‍–‍2	Reds, 5‍–‍1	Pirates; 966‍–‍920‍–‍18	
1985	Reds	9‍–‍3	Reds, 4‍–‍2	Reds, 5‍–‍1	Pirates; 969‍–‍929‍–‍18	
1986	Reds	10‍–‍2	Reds, 6‍–‍0	Reds, 4‍–‍2	Pirates; 971‍–‍939‍–‍18	
1987	Pirates	8‍–‍4	Tie, 3‍–‍3	Pirates, 5‍–‍1	Pirates; 979‍–‍943‍–‍18	
1988	Reds	7‍–‍5	Reds, 4‍–‍2	Tie, 3‍–‍3	Pirates; 984‍–‍950‍–‍18	
1989	Reds	7‍–‍5	Tie, 3‍–‍3	Reds, 4‍–‍2	Pirates; 989‍–‍957‍–‍18	

1990s (Reds, 68–61)

Season	Season series		at Pittsburgh Pirates	at Cincinnati Reds	Overall series	Notes
1990	Tie	6‍–‍6	Reds, 4‍–‍2	Pirates, 4‍–‍2	Pirates; 995‍–‍963‍–‍18	Reds win 1990 World Series
1990 NLCS	Reds	4‍–‍2	Reds, 2‍–‍1	Reds, 2‍–‍1	Pirates; 997‍–‍967‍–‍18	Fifth meeting in the postseason. Reds proceed to win World Series.
1991	Pirates	10‍–‍2	Pirates, 5‍–‍1	Pirates, 5‍–‍1	Pirates; 1,007‍–‍969‍–‍18	
1992	Tie	6‍–‍6	Reds, 4‍–‍2	Pirates, 4‍–‍2	Pirates; 1,013‍–‍975‍–‍18	
1993	Reds	8‍–‍4	Tie, 3‍–‍3	Reds, 5‍–‍1	Pirates; 1,017‍–‍983‍–‍18	
1994	Reds	9‍–‍3	Reds, 4‍–‍2	Reds, 5‍–‍1	Pirates; 1,020‍–‍992‍–‍18	MLB realignment places both Pirates and Reds into new NL Central. Strike-shortened season. Strike cancels postseason. MLB adds Wild Card, allowing for both teams to make the postseason in the same year.
1995	Reds	8‍–‍5	Reds, 5‍–‍1	Pirates, 4‍–‍3	Pirates; 1,025‍–‍1,000‍–‍18	1994 realignment increases meetings from 12 to 13 meetings per year.
1996	Pirates	8‍–‍5	Pirates, 5‍–‍2	Tie, 3‍–‍3	Pirates; 1,033‍–‍1,005‍–‍18	Reds' Riverfront Stadium renamed Cinergy Field
1997	Reds	8‍–‍4	Tie, 3‍–‍3	Reds, 5‍–‍1	Pirates; 1,037‍–‍1,013‍–‍18	
1998	Pirates	7‍–‍5	Pirates, 4‍–‍2	Tie, 3‍–‍3	Pirates; 1,044‍–‍1,018‍–‍18	MLB changed to an unbalanced schedule in 1998 due to MLB's expansion and realignment, resulting in 12‍–‍13 meetings per year.
1999	Reds	7‍–‍6	Tie, 3‍–‍3	Reds, 4‍–‍3	Pirates; 1,050‍–‍1,025‍–‍18	

2000s (Reds, 87–77)

Season	Season series		at Pittsburgh Pirates	at Cincinnati Reds	Overall series	Notes
2000	Reds	7‍–‍6	Reds, 4‍–‍3	Tie, 3‍–‍3	Pirates; 1,056‍–‍1,032‍–‍18	
2001	Reds	9‍–‍8	Reds, 4‍–‍3	Tie, 5‍–‍5	Pirates; 1,064‍–‍1,041‍–‍18	MLB changed to an unbalanced schedule in 2001, resulting in 18-19 meetings per year Pirates open PNC Park
2002	Reds	11‍–‍7	Reds, 5‍–‍4	Reds, 6‍–‍3	Pirates; 1,071‍–‍1,052‍–‍18	
2003	Pirates	11‍–‍5	Pirates, 4‍–‍3	Pirates, 7‍–‍2	Pirates; 1,082‍–‍1,057‍–‍18	Reds open Great American Ball Park
2004	Pirates	10‍–‍9	Tie, 5‍–‍5	Pirates, 5‍–‍4	Pirates; 1,092‍–‍1,066‍–‍18	
2005	Reds	9‍–‍7	Reds, 4‍–‍3	Reds, 5‍–‍4	Pirates; 1,099‍–‍1,075‍–‍18	
2006	Reds	9‍–‍7	Pirates, 4‍–‍2	Reds, 7‍–‍3	Pirates; 1,106‍–‍1,084‍–‍18	
2007	Reds	9‍–‍7	Reds, 6‍–‍3	Pirates, 4‍–‍3	Pirates; 1,113‍–‍1,093‍–‍18	
2008	Pirates	9‍–‍6	Pirates, 4‍–‍2	Pirates, 5‍–‍4	Pirates; 1,122‍–‍1,099‍–‍18	
2009	Reds	13‍–‍5	Reds, 6‍–‍3	Reds, 7‍–‍2	Pirates; 1,127‍–‍1,112‍–‍18	

2010s (Pirates, 92–91)

Season	Season series		at Pittsburgh Pirates	at Cincinnati Reds	Overall series	Notes
2010	Reds	10‍–‍6	Reds, 5‍–‍4	Reds, 5‍–‍2	Pirates; 1,133‍–‍1,122‍–‍18	
2011	Pirates	10‍–‍5	Pirates, 5‍–‍4	Pirates, 5‍–‍1	Pirates; 1,143‍–‍1,127‍–‍18	
2012	Reds	11‍–‍7	Reds, 5‍–‍4	Reds, 6‍–‍3	Pirates; 1,150‍–‍1,138‍–‍18	
2013	Pirates	11‍–‍8	Pirates, 5‍–‍4	Pirates, 6‍–‍4	Pirates; 1,161‍–‍1,146‍–‍18	Both AL and NL having balanced teams leads to a balanced schedule of 19 games per season.
2013 NLWC	Pirates	1‍–‍0	Pirates, 1‍–‍0	—	Pirates; 1,162‍–‍1,146‍–‍18	Sixth meeting in the postseason. First meeting in the Wild Card Game since MLB added this round in 2012.
2014	Reds	12‍–‍7	Reds, 6‍–‍4	Reds, 6‍–‍3	Pirates; 1,169‍–‍1,158‍–‍18	
2015	Reds	11‍–‍8	Reds, 5‍–‍4	Reds, 6‍–‍4	Pirates; 1,177‍–‍1,169‍–‍18	
2016	Pirates	10‍–‍9	Tie, 5‍–‍5	Pirates, 5‍–‍4	Pirates; 1,187‍–‍1,178‍–‍18	
2017	Reds	13‍–‍6	Reds, 6‍–‍3	Reds, 7‍–‍3	Pirates; 1,193‍–‍1,191‍–‍18	
2018	Pirates	14‍–‍5	Pirates, 8‍–‍2	Pirates, 6‍–‍3	Pirates; 1,207‍–‍1,196‍–‍18	
2019	Pirates	12‍–‍7	Pirates, 8‍–‍2	Reds, 5‍–‍4	Pirates; 1,219‍–‍1,203‍–‍18	Kela, Dietrich brawl

2020s (Tied, 50–50)

Season	Season series		at Pittsburgh Pirates	at Cincinnati Reds	Overall series	Notes
2020	Reds	7‍–‍3	Reds, 2‍–‍1	Reds, 5‍–‍2	Pirates; 1,222‍–‍1,210‍–‍18	Season shortened to 60 games (with 10 meetings) due to COVID-19 pandemic.
2021	Reds	13‍–‍6	Pirates, 5‍–‍4	Reds, 9‍–‍1	Pirates; 1,228‍–‍1,223‍–‍18	
2022	Pirates	12‍–‍7	Pirates, 6‍–‍4	Pirates, 6‍–‍3	Pirates; 1,240‍–‍1,230‍–‍18	
2023	Pirates	8‍–‍5	Pirates, 5‍–‍2	Tie, 3‍–‍3	Pirates; 1,248‍–‍1,235‍–‍18	Schedule structure modified this season to allow every team to play one series against every interleague team. Shortening meetings from 19 to 13 games.
2024	Pirates	8‍–‍5	Pirates, 5‍–‍2	Tie, 3‍–‍3	Pirates; 1,256‍–‍1,240‍–‍18	
2025	Reds	7‍–‍6	Pirates, 4‍–‍3	Reds, 4‍–‍2	Pirates; 1,262‍–‍1,247‍–‍18	
2026	Pirates	7‍–‍6	Pirates, 4‍–‍2	Reds, 4‍–‍3	Pirates; 1,269‍–‍1,253‍–‍18	

Summary of Results

Season	Season series		at Pittsburgh Pirates	at Cincinnati Reds	Notes
American Association Regular season games	Red Stockings	42‍–‍33‍–‍1	Alleghenys, 20‍–‍16‍–‍1	Red Stockings, 26‍–‍13	
National League Regular season games	Pirates	1,228‍–‍1,198‍–‍17	Pirates, 663‍–‍542‍–‍8	Reds, 656‍–‍565‍–‍9	
Overall Regular season games	Pirates	1,261‍–‍1,240‍–‍18	Pirates, 683‍–‍558‍–‍9	Reds, 682‍–‍578‍–‍9	
Postseason games	Reds	13‍–‍8	Reds, 6‍–‍4	Reds, 7‍–‍4	
Postseason series	Reds	4‍–‍2	Reds, 3‍–‍2‍–‍1	Reds, 4‍–‍1	NLWC: 2013; NLCS: 1970, 1972, 1975, 1979, 1990
Overall Regular season and postseason	Pirates	1,269‍–‍1,253‍–‍18	Pirates, 687‍–‍564‍–‍9	Reds, 689‍–‍582‍–‍9	

== See also ==
- Bengals–Steelers rivalry
