= Bengals–Steelers rivalry =

National Football League rivalry

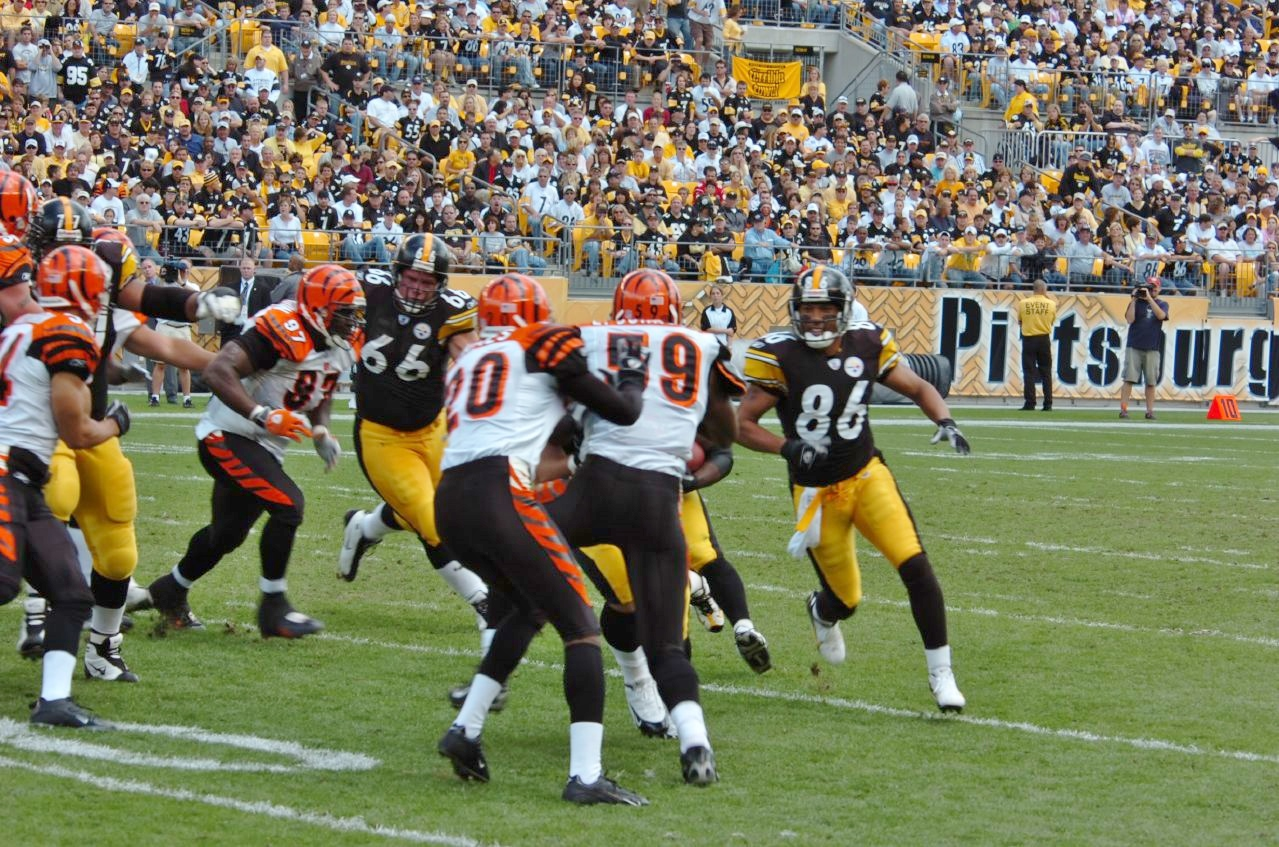
- Bengals and Steelers face off during the 2006 season.

- Cincinnati Bengals Pittsburgh Steelers
- Location: Cincinnati, Pittsburgh
- First meeting: November 2, 1970; Steelers 21, Bengals 10
- Latest meeting: November 15, 2026; Bengals 38, Steelers 18
- Next meeting: 2027
- Stadiums: Bengals: Paycor Stadium; Steelers: Acrisure Stadium

Statistics
- Total meetings: 115
- All-time series: Steelers: 73–42
- Regular season series: Steelers: 71–42
- Postseason results: Steelers: 2–0
- Largest victory: Bengals: 42–7 (1988); Steelers: 38–10 (2008), 35–7 (2011)
- Most points scored: Bengals: 42 (1988); Steelers: 49 (1995)
- Longest win streak: Bengals: 6 (1988–1990); Steelers: 11 (2015–2020)
- Current win streak: Bengals: 1 (2026–present)

Post-season history
- 2005 AFC Wild Card: Steelers won: 31–17; 2015 AFC Wild Card: Steelers won: 18–16

The Bengals–Steelers rivalry is a National Football League (NFL) rivalry between the Cincinnati Bengals and Pittsburgh Steelers.

The two teams have played each other twice a year since becoming division rivals in 1970. Originally placed in the AFC Central following the 1970 AFL–NFL merger, the two teams currently compete in that division's successor, the AFC North. The rivalry would reach new heights in the 2000s in which the Steelers knocked the Bengals out of the playoffs, as well as injuring Carson Palmer, en route to their fifth Super Bowl victory.

The Steelers lead the overall series, 73–42. The two teams have met twice in the playoffs, with the Steelers winning both games.

== History ==
=== 1970–1973: Beginning of the rivalry ===
Prior to 1970, the Steelers were members of the NFL and the Bengals were part of the AFL. However, as part of the AFL-NFL merger, the two teams were placed in the AFC Central division along with the NFL's Cleveland Browns and the AFL's Houston Oilers. Thus, the Bengals and Steelers have played each other twice every season since (except the strike-shortened 1982 campaign).

The Steelers defeated the Bengals in their first meeting, 21–10 at Pittsburgh's Three Rivers Stadium. However, the Bengals would win the rematch in Cincinnati 34–7 during a 7-game winning streak that pushed the Bengals to the division championship.

The Steelers would win four of the next six meetings to take a 5–3 series lead early in its history.

=== 1974–1979: Steelers' Super Bowl dynasty ===
The Steelers dominated the rivalry – and the entire NFL – mid-to-late 1970s, posting a 9–3 record against the Bengals during this time. The Steelers won four Super Bowls during these six years.

The Steelers were led by their "Steel Curtain" defense, as they held the Bengals to 17 points or less during ten of the twelve meetings during this stretch. The Steelers were also able to win two games despite scoring a single touchdown as they won 7–3 in 1976 and 7–6 in 1978 – the two lowest-scoring games in the history of the rivalry. The Steelers would also win six straight games from 1974 to 1977.

One bright spot for the Bengals occurred in their 1979 meeting in Cincinnati. The Bengals, who were 0–6 entering the game, forced nine Steelers turnovers on their way to a 34–10 blowout win over the eventual world champion Steelers.

=== 1980–1990: Bengals' resurgence ===
On October 12, 1980, the Bengals defeated the Steelers 17–16 at Three Rivers Stadium, snapping the Steelers' 18-game home winning streak and their undefeated 10–0 record at home against the Bengals. This game, along with an earlier Bengals' win in Cincinnati, were the only two losses for the then-4–2 Steelers, as they eventually finished 9–7, missing the playoffs for the first time since 1971.

The Bengals swept the 1981 season series as well, on their way to their first Super Bowl appearance.

Because of the 1982 NFL Players Strike, the game in Cincinnati that season was cancelled. The Steelers won the only meeting of the year in Pittsburgh, 26–20 in overtime. This marks the only season in which the Steelers and Bengals did not meet twice.

The Bengals closed the gap of the Steelers' lead throughout the 1980s. On November 6, 1988, the Bengals defeated the Steelers 42–7, the largest margin of victory for either team in the series. The Bengals went on to Super Bowl XXIII that season, their most recent appearance in a Super Bowl until 2021.

The Bengals won six straight meetings from 1988 to 1990, which gave them a 21–20 lead in the overall series after the 1990 season. To date, this is the only time the Bengals led the series.

=== 1991–2003: Steelers in contention, Bengals struggle ===
The Steelers returned to dominating the rivalry in the 1990s. Immediately following the Bengals' six-game winning streak, Pittsburgh won eight straight meetings from 1991 to 1994.

On November 30, 1992, the Steelers sacked Bengals quarterback David Klingler ten times, one short of the single-game NFL record, en route to a 21–9 Steelers win. Combined with a 20–0 victory earlier in the season, the Steelers did not allow a touchdown to the Bengals in either of their two meetings that year.

On October 19, 1995, the Bengals defeated the Steelers, 27–9 on Thursday Night Football. Despite outgaining the Bengals by 100 yards, the Steelers could not reach the end zone. In their second game that season, the Bengals had a 31–13 lead in the third quarter, but the Steelers scored 36 unanswered points to win 49–31. The Steelers would play in Super Bowl XXX that season, but lost to the Dallas Cowboys.

In 1998, the Bengals struggled to a 3–13 record, however, two of those wins came against the Steelers, as the Bengals earned their first sweep of the Steelers since 1990, and these two led to Bill Cowher's first losing season as Steelers head coach.

Both teams opened new stadiums in the early 2000s. The Bengals opened Paul Brown Stadium in 2000 and the Steelers opened Heinz Field in 2001. The two teams opened Heinz Field on October 7, 2001, a 16–7 Steelers win. The Steelers dominated the series in the early 2000s as they were perennial playoff contenders, while the Bengals finished near the bottom of the league.

=== 2004–2021: The Ben Roethlisberger era ===
Both teams drafted franchise quarterbacks in the early-to-mid 2000s. The Bengals drafted Carson Palmer first overall in 2003, while the Steelers selected Ben Roethlisberger in the first round the following year. Roethlisberger's Steelers have posted a 24–10 record against the Bengals, including wins in two playoff meetings.

The Steelers and Bengals met in the Playoffs for the first time in a 2005 AFC wild card game in Cincinnati. The Bengals lost Palmer to an injury on their first drive, but built a 17–7 lead. The Steelers scored 24 unanswered points to defeat the Bengals, 31–17. The Steelers would go on to win Super Bowl XL that season.

The Steelers swept the Bengals in 2007 and 2008, on their way to consecutive division titles and a Super Bowl XLIII win following the 2008 season.

In 2009, the Bengals swept the Steelers and won all of their division game for the first time in franchise history. The game in Cincinnati marked Roethlisberger's first loss in his home state of Ohio, having previously been 10–0 at Cincinnati and Cleveland.

Palmer announced his intention to retire after the 2010 season (although he would later return to the NFL with the Oakland Raiders and Arizona Cardinals) and the Bengals drafted Andy Dalton in 2011. The Steelers continued to dominate the rivalry, going 13–3 against Dalton's Bengals.

The teams' second postseason meeting occurred in the 2015 AFC Wild Card game in Cincinnati. The Steelers built a 15–0 after three quarters, however Roethlisberger had left the game due to an injury. Bengals quarterback A. J. McCarron, starting for an injured Dalton, led the Bengals to 16 straight points. However, Steelers linebacker Ryan Shazier would force Bengals running back Jeremy Hill to fumble and the Steelers recovered the loose ball. Roethlisberger returned and led the Steelers on their final drive. On an incomplete pass to Antonio Brown, Bengals linebacker Vontaze Burfict was flagged for unnecessary roughness on a brutal and concussing blow to Brown's head; the hit subsequently led to the suspension of Burfict for the first three games of 2016. Immediately afterwards, Bengals cornerback Adam Jones was flagged for a personal foul due to an altercation with Steelers assistant coach Joey Porter. From there, Steelers kicker Chris Boswell made the game-winning field goal from 35 yards.

In a 2017 game, the Bengals took a 17–0 lead, but the Steelers outscored them 23–3 the rest of the game for 23–20 win. The game was a brutal affair with serious injuries to Shazier, Mixon and Burfict and subsequent suspensions to JuJu Smith-Schuster and George Iloka (with Iloka's later being overturned). The two teams clocked up four penalties for unnecessary roughness, one for unsportsmanlike conduct, one for roughing the passer and another for taunting. The Bengals themselves clocked up 13 penalties for 173 yards. When asked about the viciousness and the brutality of the game, Roethlisberger responded that it was "AFC North football".

In 2018, Roethlisberger led the Steelers to a come-from behind 28–21 win with a late touchdown pass to Antonio Brown. During that game, Burfict was fined $112,000 for illegal hits on Brown and Steelers running back James Conner. There was also controversy surrounding the next play when Burfict pointed at JuJu Smith-Schuster and told him "You're next." In their first meeting of the 2019 season, the Steelers, led by backup quarterback Mason Rudolph, defeated the Bengals for a record ninth time in a row.

During the 2020 season, Bengals rookie quarterback Joe Burrow made his debut in the rivalry, throwing for 215 yards and a touchdown, but it was the Steelers who came away with a 36–10 win. Despite the fact that Burrow suffered a season-ending injury the following week, the Bengals snapped an 11-game losing streak to the Steelers during their Week 15 Monday Night Football rematch, winning 27–17.

In 2021, the Bengals, now with a fully healthy Burrow under center, swept the Steelers for the first time since 2009 en route to the first AFC North division title and playoff appearance since 2015. Both teams went on to make the playoffs that season; the Steelers were eliminated in the first round by the Kansas City Chiefs while the Bengals made it to Super Bowl LVI (which they lost to the Los Angeles Rams). After the season, Ben Roethlisberger announced his retirement.

=== 2022–present ===
During Week 1 of the 2022 season, the Steelers defeated the Bengals in Cincinnati, 23–20 in overtime, led by new Steelers quarterback Mitchell Trubisky. As of the 2026 season, the rivalry has become even between the Bengals and Steelers, with both teams having seven victories so far in the 2020s.

== Season-by-season results ==
Cincinnati Bengals vs. Pittsburgh Steelers Season-by-Season Results
1970s (Steelers, 14–6)

Season	Season series	at Cincinnati Bengals	at Pittsburgh Steelers	Overall series	Notes
1970	Tie 1–1	Bengals; 34–7	Steelers; 21–10	Tie; 1–1	As a result of the AFL–NFL merger, the Bengals and Steelers are placed in the AFC Central (later renamed to the AFC North in the 2002 season).
1971	Steelers 2–0	Steelers; 21–13	Steelers; 21–10	Steelers; 3–1	
1972	Tie 1–1	Bengals; 15–10	Steelers; 40–17	Steelers; 4–2	
1973	Tie, 1–1	Bengals; 19–7	Steelers; 20–13	Steelers; 5–3	Both teams finished with 10–4 records, but the Bengals clinched the AFC Central based on a better conference record.
1974	Tie, 1–1	Bengals; 17–10	Steelers; 27–3	Steelers; 6–4	Bengals' win is the Steelers' only road loss in the 1974 season. Steelers win Super Bowl IX.
1975	Steelers 2–0	Steelers; 30–24	Steelers; 35–14	Steelers; 8–4	Steelers win Super Bowl X.
1976	Steelers 2–0	Steelers; 7–3	Steelers; 23–6	Steelers; 10–4	Both teams finished with 10–4 records, but the Steelers clinched the AFC Central based on their head-to-head sweep, eliminating the Bengals from playoff contention.
1977	Tie 1–1	Bengals; 17–10	Steelers; 20–14	Steelers; 11–5	
1978	Steelers 2–0	Steelers; 28–3	Steelers; 7–6	Steelers; 13–5	Steelers win Super Bowl XIII.
1979	Tie 1–1	Bengals; 34–10	Steelers; 37–17	Steelers; 14–6	In Cincinnati, Bengals force nine Steelers turnovers. Steelers win 10 straight home meetings (1970–1979). Steelers win Super Bowl XIV.

1980s (Bengals, 13–6)

Season	Season series	at Cincinnati Bengals	at Pittsburgh Steelers	Overall series	Notes
1980	Bengals 2–0	Bengals; 30–28	Bengals; 17–16	Steelers; 14–8	Bengals' win in Pittsburgh ended the Steelers' 18-game home winning streak. Bengals record their first road win and season series sweep against the Steelers.
1981	Bengals 2–0	Bengals; 34–7	Bengals; 17–10	Steelers; 14–10	Bengals lose Super Bowl XVI.
1982	Steelers 1–0	canceled	Steelers; 26–20 (OT)	Steelers; 15–10	Due to the 1982 NFL players' strike, the game scheduled in Cincinnati was canceled.
1983	Tie, 1–1	Steelers; 24–14	Bengals; 23–10	Steelers; 16–11	
1984	Tie 1–1	Bengals; 22–20	Steelers; 38–17	Steelers; 17–12	
1985	Bengals 2–0	Bengals; 26–21	Bengals; 37–24	Steelers; 17–14	
1986	Tie, 1–1	Bengals; 24–22	Steelers; 30–9	Steelers; 18–15	
1987	Steelers 2–0	Steelers; 30–16	Steelers; 23–20	Steelers; 20–15	
1988	Bengals 2–0	Bengals; 42–7	Bengals; 17–12	Steelers; 20–17	In Cincinnati, Bengals record their largest victory against the Steelers with a 35–point differential and score their most points in a game against the Steelers. Bengals lose Super Bowl XXIII.
1989	Bengals 2–0	Bengals; 41–10	Bengals; 26–16	Steelers; 20–19	

1990s (Steelers, 13–7)

Season	Season series	at Cincinnati Bengals	at Pittsburgh Steelers	Overall series	Notes
1990	Bengals 2–0	Bengals; 27–3	Bengals; 16–12	Bengals; 21–20	Bengals take the first and only lead in the overall series. Following their win in Pittsburgh, Bengals go on a 12-game road losing streak against divisional opponents. Both teams finished with 9–7 records along with the Houston Oilers, but the Bengals clinched the AFC Central based on having the best head-to-head record, eliminating the Steelers from playoff contention.
1991	Steelers 2–0	Steelers; 33–27 (OT)	Steelers; 17–10	Steelers; 22–21	
1992	Steelers 2–0	Steelers; 21–9	Steelers; 20–0	Steelers; 24–21	Steelers hire Bill Cowher as their head coach.
1993	Steelers 2–0	Steelers; 24–16	Steelers; 34–7	Steelers; 26–21	In Cincinnati, Steelers overcame a 16–0 deficit.
1994	Steelers 2–0	Steelers; 38–15	Steelers; 14–10	Steelers; 28–21	Steelers win 8 straight meetings (1991–1994).
1995	Tie 1–1	Steelers; 49–31	Bengals; 27–9	Steelers; 29–22	Bengals' win snapped their 12-game road losing streak against divisional opponents. In Cincinnati, Steelers overcame a 31–13 third quarter deficit to score their most points in a game against the Bengals. Steelers lose Super Bowl XXX.
1996	Tie 1–1	Bengals; 34–24	Steelers; 20–10	Steelers; 30–23	
1997	Steelers 2–0	Steelers; 26–10	Steelers; 20–3	Steelers; 32–23	
1998	Bengals 2–0	Bengals; 25–20	Bengals; 25–24	Steelers; 32–25	
1999	Tie 1–1	Steelers; 17–3	Bengals; 27–20	Steelers; 33–26	

2000s (Steelers, 15–6)

Season	Season series	at Cincinnati Bengals	at Pittsburgh Steelers	Overall series	Notes
2000	Steelers 2–0	Steelers; 48–28	Steelers; 15–0	Steelers; 35–26	Bengals open Paul Brown Stadium (now known as Paycor Stadium).
2001	Tie 1–1	Bengals; 26–23 (OT)	Steelers; 16–7	Steelers; 36–27	Steelers open Heinz Field (now known as Acrisure Stadium). In Cincinnati, Bengals overcame a 23–10 deficit in the fourth quarter.
2002	Steelers 2–0	Steelers; 34–7	Steelers; 29–21	Steelers; 38–27	
2003	Tie 1–1	Steelers; 17–10	Bengals; 24–20	Steelers; 39–28	
2004	Steelers 2–0	Steelers; 19–14	Steelers; 28–17	Steelers; 41–28	Steelers draft QB Ben Roethlisberger.
2005	Tie 1–1	Steelers; 27–13	Bengals; 38–31	Steelers; 42–29	Both teams finished with 11–5 records, but the Bengals clinched the AFC North based on a better division record, setting up an AFC Wild Card Round game at Cincinnati the following week.
2005 Playoffs	Steelers 1–0	Steelers 31–17	—N/a	Steelers 43–29	AFC Wild Card Round. Bengals' QB Carson Palmer suffers an injury on the Bengals' second offensive play. Steelers go on to win Super Bowl XL.
2006	Tie 1–1	Steelers; 23–17 (OT)	Bengals; 28–20	Steelers; 44–30	Steelers eliminate the Bengals from playoff contention with their win. Game in Cincinnati was Bill Cowher's final game as the Steelers' head coach.
2007	Steelers 2–0	Steelers; 24–13	Steelers; 24–10	Steelers; 46–30	Steelers hire Mike Tomlin as their head coach.
2008	Steelers 2–0	Steelers; 38–10	Steelers; 27–10	Steelers; 48–30	In Cincinnati, Steelers record their largest victory against the Bengals with a 28–point differential. Steelers win eight straight road meetings (2002–2008). Steelers win Super Bowl XLIII.
2009	Bengals 2–0	Bengals; 23–20	Bengals; 18–12	Steelers; 48–32	Bengals' first season series sweep against the Steelers since the 1998 season. Bengals sweep the AFC North for the first time in franchise history.

2010s (Steelers, 18–3)

Season	Season series	at Cincinnati Bengals	at Pittsburgh Steelers	Overall series	Notes
2010	Steelers 2–0	Steelers; 27–21	Steelers; 23–7	Steelers; 50–32	Steelers lose Super Bowl XLV.
2011	Steelers 2–0	Steelers; 24–17	Steelers; 35–7	Steelers; 52–32	In Pittsburgh, Steelers tie their largest victory against the Bengals with a 28–point differential.
2012	Tie 1–1	Steelers; 24–17	Bengals; 13–10	Steelers; 53–33	Bengals clinch a playoff berth with their win.
2013	Tie 1–1	Bengals; 20–10	Steelers; 30–20	Steelers; 54–34	
2014	Steelers 2–0	Steelers; 42–21	Steelers; 27–17	Steelers; 56–34	In Pittsburgh, Steelers clinch the AFC North with their win.
2015	Tie 1–1	Steelers; 33–20	Bengals; 16–10	Steelers; 57–35	
2015 Playoffs	Steelers 1–0	Steelers 18–16	—N/a	Steelers 58–35	AFC Wild Card Round. The Bengals led 16–15 with a chance to run the clock out, but RB Jeremy Hill fumbled to give the Steelers one last chance. Following two personal fouls by the Bengals, one of which was a severe hit by LB Vontaze Burfict that resulted in a three-game suspension, K Chris Boswell made the game-winning 35-yard field goal.
2016	Steelers 2–0	Steelers; 24–20	Steelers; 24–16	Steelers; 60–35	In Cincinnati, Steelers' K Chris Boswell makes six field goals, tying a franchise record for their most field goals made in a game.
2017	Steelers 2–0	Steelers; 23–20	Steelers; 29–14	Steelers; 62–35	In Cincinnati, Steelers overcame a 17–0 deficit. The game also saw significant injuries to Steelers' LB Ryan Shazier and Bengals' LB Vontaze Burfict. Additionally, Steelers' WR JuJu Smith-Schuster and Bengals' S George Iloka received suspensions, although Iloka's suspension was later overturned.
2018	Steelers 2–0	Steelers; 28–21	Steelers; 16–13	Steelers; 64–35	
2019	Steelers 2–0	Steelers; 16–10	Steelers; 27–3	Steelers; 66–35	

2020s (Tied, 7–7)

Season	Season series	at Cincinnati Bengals	at Pittsburgh Steelers	Overall series	Notes
2020	Tie 1–1	Bengals; 27–17	Steelers; 36–10	Steelers; 67–36	Steelers win 11 straight meetings (2015–2020).
2021	Bengals 2–0	Bengals; 41–10	Bengals; 24–10	Steelers; 67–38	Bengals' first season series sweep against the Steelers since the 2009 season. Last season for Steelers' QB Ben Roethlisberger. Bengals lose Super Bowl LVI.
2022	Tie 1–1	Steelers; 23–20 (OT)	Bengals; 37–30	Steelers; 68–39	In Cincinnati, Steelers force five turnovers.
2023	Steelers 2–0	Steelers; 16–10	Steelers; 34–11	Steelers; 70–39	
2024	Tie 1–1	Steelers; 44–38	Bengals; 19–17	Steelers; 71–40	
2025	Tie 1–1	Bengals; 33–31	Steelers; 34–12	Steelers; 72–41	In Pittsburgh, a notable incident occurred between Bengals wide receiver Ja’Marr Chase and Steelers cornerback Jalen Ramsey. Chase reportedly spat on Ramsey, who retaliated by punching him, resulting in Ramsey's ejection. Chase was later suspended for one game for his actions.
2026	Tie 1–1	Bengals; 38–18	Steelers; 30–27	Steelers; 73–42	

Summary of Results

Season	Season series	at Cincinnati Bengals	at Pittsburgh Steelers	Notes
Regular Season	Steelers 71–42	Steelers 34–22	Steelers 37–20	
Postseason games	Steelers 2–0	Steelers 2–0	no games	AFC Wild Card: 2005, 2015
Regular and postseason	Steelers 73–42	Steelers 36–22	Steelers 37–20	

== See also ==
- List of NFL rivalries
- AFC North
- Pirates–Reds rivalry
