= 1990 Major League Baseball season =

1990 MLB season
- League: Major League Baseball
- Sport: Baseball
- Duration: April 9 – October 20, 1990
- Games: 162
- Teams: 26
- TV partner(s): CBS; ESPN

Draft
- Top draft pick: Chipper Jones
- Picked by: Atlanta Braves

Regular Season
- Season MVP: AL: Rickey Henderson (OAK); NL: Barry Bonds (PIT)

Postseason
- AL champions: Oakland Athletics
- AL runners-up: Boston Red Sox
- NL champions: Cincinnati Reds
- NL runners-up: Pittsburgh Pirates

World Series
- Champions: Cincinnati Reds
- Runners-up: Oakland Athletics
- World Series MVP: José Rijo (CIN)

MLB seasons
- ← 1989 1991 →

Locations of teams for the 1989–1990 American League seasons
West East
Locations of teams for the 1977–1992 National League seasons
West East

The 1990 Major League Baseball season saw the Cincinnati Reds upset the heavily favored Oakland Athletics in the World Series, for their first title since 1976. This was Fay Vincent's first full season as commissioner.

== Awards and honors ==
- Baseball Hall of Fame
  - Joe Morgan
  - Jim Palmer

Baseball Writers' Association of America Awards
BBWAA Award	National League	American League
Rookie of the Year	David Justice (ATL)	Sandy Alomar Jr. (CLE)
Cy Young Award	Doug Drabek (PIT)	Bob Welch (OAK)
Manager of the Year	Jim Leyland (PIT)	Jeff Torborg (CWS)
Most Valuable Player	Barry Bonds (PIT)	Rickey Henderson (OAK)
Gold Glove Awards
Position	National League	American League
Pitcher	Greg Maddux (CHC)	Mike Boddicker (BAL)
Catcher	Benito Santiago (SD)	Sandy Alomar Jr. (CLE)
First Baseman	Andrés Galarraga (MON)	Mark McGwire (OAK)
Second Baseman	Ryne Sandberg (CHC)	Harold Reynolds (SEA)
Third Baseman	Tim Wallach (MON)	Kelly Gruber (TOR)
Shortstop	Ozzie Smith (STL)	Ozzie Guillén (CWS)
Outfielders	Barry Bonds (PIT)	Ellis Burks (BOS)
Outfielders	Tony Gwynn (SD)	Ken Griffey Jr. (SEA)
Outfielders	Andy Van Slyke (PIT)	Gary Pettis (TEX)
Silver Slugger Awards
Pitcher/Designated Hitter	Don Robinson (SF)	Dave Parker (MIL)
Catcher	Benito Santiago (SD)	Lance Parrish (CAL)
First Baseman	Eddie Murray (LAD)	Cecil Fielder (DET)
Second Baseman	Ryne Sandberg (CHC)	Julio Franco (TEX)
Third Baseman	Matt Williams (SF)	Kelly Gruber (TOR)
Shortstop	Barry Larkin (CIN)	Alan Trammell (DET)
Outfielders	Barry Bonds (PIT)	Ellis Burks (BOS)
Outfielders	Bobby Bonilla (PIT)	Jose Canseco (OAK)
Outfielders	Darryl Strawberry (NYM)	Rickey Henderson (OAK)

=== Other awards ===
- Outstanding Designated Hitter Award: Dave Parker (MIL)
- Roberto Clemente Award (Humanitarian): Dave Stewart (OAK)
- Rolaids Relief Man Award: Bobby Thigpen (CWS, American); John Franco (NYM, National)

=== Player of the Month ===
Month	American League	National League
April	Ken Griffey Jr.	Bobby Bonilla
May	Jose Canseco	Andre Dawson
June	Brook Jacoby	Ryne Sandberg
July	George Brett	Barry Bonds
August	Cecil Fielder	David Justice
September	Kelly Gruber	Kal Daniels

=== Pitcher of the Month ===
Month	American League	National League
April	Dave Stewart	John Tudor
May	Bobby Thigpen	Jack Armstrong
June	Randy Johnson	Ramón Martínez
July	Chuck Finley; Bobby Witt	Danny Darwin; Doug Drabek
August	Roger Clemens	Doug Drabek
September	Dave Stewart	Dwight Gooden

== Statistical leaders ==
Statistic	American League		National League	
AVG	George Brett KC	.329	Willie McGee STL	.335
HR	Cecil Fielder DET	51	Ryne Sandberg CHC	40
RBI	Cecil Fielder DET	132	Matt Williams SF	122
Wins	Bob Welch OAK	27	Doug Drabek PIT	22
ERA	Roger Clemens BOS	1.93	Danny Darwin HOU	2.21
SO	Nolan Ryan TEX	232	David Cone NYM	233
SV	Bobby Thigpen CWS	57	John Franco NYM	33
SB	Rickey Henderson OAK	65	Vince Coleman STL	77

McGee won the NL batting title despite being traded to Oakland in late August.

== Standings ==
=== American League ===
AL East
Team	W	L	Pct.	GB	Home	Road
Boston Red Sox	88	74	.543	—	51‍–‍30	37‍–‍44
Toronto Blue Jays	86	76	.531	2	44‍–‍37	42‍–‍39
Detroit Tigers	79	83	.488	9	39‍–‍42	40‍–‍41
Cleveland Indians	77	85	.475	11	41‍–‍40	36‍–‍45
Baltimore Orioles	76	85	.472	11½	40‍–‍40	36‍–‍45
Milwaukee Brewers	74	88	.457	14	39‍–‍42	35‍–‍46
New York Yankees	67	95	.414	21	37‍–‍44	30‍–‍51

AL West
Team	W	L	Pct.	GB	Home	Road
Oakland Athletics	103	59	.636	—	51‍–‍30	52‍–‍29
Chicago White Sox	94	68	.580	9	49‍–‍31	45‍–‍37
Texas Rangers	83	79	.512	20	47‍–‍35	36‍–‍44
California Angels	80	82	.494	23	42‍–‍39	38‍–‍43
Seattle Mariners	77	85	.475	26	38‍–‍43	39‍–‍42
Kansas City Royals	75	86	.466	27½	45‍–‍36	30‍–‍50
Minnesota Twins	74	88	.457	29	41‍–‍40	33‍–‍48

=== National League ===
NL East
Team	W	L	Pct.	GB	Home	Road
Pittsburgh Pirates	95	67	.586	—	49‍–‍32	46‍–‍35
New York Mets	91	71	.562	4	52‍–‍29	39‍–‍42
Montreal Expos	85	77	.525	10	47‍–‍34	38‍–‍43
Chicago Cubs	77	85	.475	18	39‍–‍42	38‍–‍43
Philadelphia Phillies	77	85	.475	18	41‍–‍40	36‍–‍45
St. Louis Cardinals	70	92	.432	25	34‍–‍47	36‍–‍45

NL West
Team	W	L	Pct.	GB	Home	Road
Cincinnati Reds	91	71	.562	—	46‍–‍35	45‍–‍36
Los Angeles Dodgers	86	76	.531	5	47‍–‍34	39‍–‍42
San Francisco Giants	85	77	.525	6	49‍–‍32	36‍–‍45
Houston Astros	75	87	.463	16	49‍–‍32	26‍–‍55
San Diego Padres	75	87	.463	16	37‍–‍44	38‍–‍43
Atlanta Braves	65	97	.401	26	37‍–‍44	28‍–‍53

== Postseason ==
=== Bracket ===
League Championship Series (ALCS, NLCS)
East	Boston	0
West	Oakland	4
East	Pittsburgh	2
West	Cincinnati	4

World Series
AL	Oakland	0
NL	Cincinnati	4

== List of managers ==
=== American League ===
Team	Manager	Notes
Baltimore Orioles	Frank Robinson	
Boston Red Sox	Joe Morgan	Won AL East
California Angels	Doug Rader	
Chicago White Sox	Jeff Torborg	
Cleveland Indians	John McNamara	
Detroit Tigers	Sparky Anderson	
Kansas City Royals	John Wathan	
Milwaukee Brewers	Tom Trebelhorn	
Minnesota Twins	Tom Kelly	
New York Yankees	Bucky Dent, Stump Merrill	
Oakland Athletics	Tony La Russa	Won American League Pennant
Seattle Mariners	Jim Lefebvre	
Texas Rangers	Bobby Valentine	
Toronto Blue Jays	Cito Gaston	

=== National League ===
Team	Manager	Notes
Atlanta Braves	Russ Nixon, Bobby Cox	
Chicago Cubs	Don Zimmer	
Cincinnati Reds	Lou Piniella	Won World Series
Houston Astros	Art Howe	
Los Angeles Dodgers	Tommy Lasorda	
Montreal Expos	Buck Rodgers	
New York Mets	Davey Johnson, Bud Harrelson	
Philadelphia Phillies	Nick Leyva	
Pittsburgh Pirates	Jim Leyland	Won NL East
St. Louis Cardinals	Whitey Herzog, Red Schoendienst, Joe Torre	
San Diego Padres	Jack McKeon, Greg Riddoch	
San Francisco Giants	Roger Craig	

== Home field attendance and payroll ==
Team name	Wins	%±	Home attendance	%±	Per game	Est. payroll	%±
Toronto Blue Jays	86	−3.4%	3,885,284	15.1%	47,966	$19,259,334	16.1%
Los Angeles Dodgers	86	11.7%	3,002,396	2.0%	37,067	$22,018,704	4.5%
Oakland Athletics	103	4.0%	2,900,217	8.7%	35,805	$20,087,501	23.1%
New York Mets	91	4.6%	2,732,745	−6.4%	33,738	$21,922,834	10.2%
St. Louis Cardinals	70	−18.6%	2,573,225	−16.5%	31,768	$21,048,334	30.9%
California Angels	80	−12.1%	2,555,688	−3.5%	31,552	$22,417,500	48.5%
Boston Red Sox	88	6.0%	2,528,986	0.8%	31,222	$20,858,333	12.4%
Baltimore Orioles	76	−12.6%	2,415,189	−4.7%	30,190	$10,100,084	−7.5%
Cincinnati Reds	91	21.3%	2,400,892	21.3%	29,641	$14,470,000	23.5%
Kansas City Royals	75	−18.5%	2,244,956	−9.4%	27,716	$24,161,084	27.7%
Chicago Cubs	77	−17.2%	2,243,791	−10.0%	27,701	$14,599,000	22.5%
Texas Rangers	83	0.0%	2,057,911	0.7%	25,096	$15,597,872	31.1%
Pittsburgh Pirates	95	28.4%	2,049,908	49.2%	25,308	$15,556,000	11.2%
New York Yankees	67	−9.5%	2,006,436	−7.6%	24,771	$21,312,318	24.5%
Chicago White Sox	94	36.2%	2,002,357	91.5%	25,029	$10,721,500	25.2%
Philadelphia Phillies	77	14.9%	1,992,484	7.0%	24,599	$13,740,167	27.5%
San Francisco Giants	85	−7.6%	1,975,528	−4.1%	24,389	$21,565,333	43.4%
San Diego Padres	75	−15.7%	1,856,396	−7.6%	22,918	$17,788,334	16.3%
Milwaukee Brewers	74	−8.6%	1,752,900	−11.1%	21,641	$20,149,167	58.5%
Minnesota Twins	74	−7.5%	1,751,584	−23.1%	21,624	$15,272,000	−9.1%
Seattle Mariners	77	5.5%	1,509,727	16.3%	18,639	$12,867,667	27.4%
Detroit Tigers	79	33.9%	1,495,785	−3.1%	18,466	$18,393,238	17.4%
Montreal Expos	85	4.9%	1,373,087	−23.0%	16,952	$17,334,888	25.5%
Houston Astros	75	−12.8%	1,310,927	−28.6%	16,184	$18,752,500	20.4%
Cleveland Indians	77	5.5%	1,225,240	−4.7%	15,126	$15,208,000	53.7%
Atlanta Braves	65	3.2%	980,129	−0.5%	12,100	$15,065,501	34.8%

== National television coverage ==
This was the first season of four-year deals with CBS and ESPN. CBS was awarded the rights to broadcast Saturday afternoon games, the All-Star game and the entire postseason. ESPN's games included Sunday Night Baseball, Wednesday Night Baseball and doubleheaders on Tuesdays and Fridays.

Network	Day of week	Announcers
CBS	Saturday afternoons	Jack Buck, Tim McCarver, Dick Stockton, Jim Kaat
ESPN	Sunday nights Tuesday nights Wednesday nights Friday nights	Jon Miller, Joe Morgan See also: List of ESPN Major League Baseball broadcasters

== Events ==
- January 9 – Jim Palmer, a three-time American League Cy Young Award winner and Joe Morgan, a two-time National League MVP, are elected to the Hall of Fame by the Baseball Writers' Association of America in their first year of eligibility.
- February – The 1990 Major League Baseball lockout begins. It lasts 32 days and as a result virtually wipes out all of spring training and also pushes Opening Day back a week to April 9. In addition, the 1990 season has to be extended by three days in order to accommodate the normal 162-game schedule. The same outcome would also occur for the 2021–22 Major League Baseball lockout, which had the 2022 season pushed back a week to April 7 and extended by three days to October 5.
- April 14 – CBS begins broadcasting Major League Baseball games.
- April 15 – Sunday Night Baseball debuts on ESPN.
- April 20 – After retiring the first 26 Oakland Athletics batters, Brian Holman loses a perfect game when Ken Phelps hits a home run in an eventual 6–1 Seattle Mariners win.
- May 22 – Andre Dawson of the Chicago Cubs is intentionally walked by Cincinnati Reds' pitching five times. He is the first player to do so in Major League history.
- June 6 – The highest-profile managerial firing of 1990 season happens when the New York Yankees fire Bucky Dent before a game against their rivals at Fenway Park, where he hit his famous three-run home run in a one-game playoff game in 1978, making Fenway Park the scene of his greatest moment as a player and worst moment as manager.
- June 11 – Nolan Ryan pitches the sixth no-hitter of his career by defeating the Oakland Athletics in Oakland, 5–0.
- June 14 – It is announced that the National League will be expanding by two teams for the 1993 season.
- June 29 – For the first time in major league history, two no-hitters are thrown on the same day; one in each league. Dave Stewart of the Oakland Athletics pitches a 5–0 no-hitter against his future team, the Toronto Blue Jays, at SkyDome. Hours later, Dodger pitcher Fernando Valenzuela no-hits the St. Louis Cardinals at Dodger Stadium, 6–0.
- July 1 – While no longer recognized as such, the New York Yankees' Andy Hawkins pitches a no-hitter at old Comiskey Park. However, walks and errors lead to four unearned runs as the Chicago White Sox win 4–0.
- July 10 – Six American League pitchers combine for a two-hitter and a 2–0 victory over the National League in a rain-delayed All-Star Game at Wrigley Field in Chicago. Texas Rangers second baseman Julio Franco drives in both runs in the seventh inning and is named MVP.
- July 11 – The Chicago White Sox host Major League Baseball's first-ever Turn Back the Clock Day game against the Milwaukee Brewers. The White Sox wear slightly modified versions of the uniforms worn in 1917, the year of their most recent World Series at the time. The promotion is aimed at celebrating Comiskey Park's final season. Ballpark ushers and grounds crew wear uniforms from the time period and some use megaphones to announce lineups. Also, ticket prices for the contest were as low as $.50. The White Sox fall 12–9 to the Brewers in 13 innings.
- July 12 – Barry Bonds hits his 100th career home run.
- July 17 – The Minnesota Twins turn two triple plays in a single game against the Boston Red Sox, yet still lose the game 1–0 on an unearned run.
- July 31 – Nolan Ryan of the Texas Rangers earns his 300th career win, an 11–3 pounding of the Milwaukee Brewers, becoming the 20th member of the 300-win club.
- August 31 – Ken Griffey and his son Ken Griffey Jr. start for the Seattle Mariners in a game against the Kansas City Royals. It marks the first time a father and son have ever played in the same Major League game.
- September 2 – After coming close on numerous occasions, Dave Stieb of the Toronto Blue Jays hurls his team's first (and so far only) no-hitter, blanking the Cleveland Indians 3–0 at Cleveland Stadium.
- September 3 – Reliever Bobby Thigpen sets a major league record with his 47th save in a 4–2 Chicago White Sox victory over the Kansas City Royals. The previous record was set by Dave Righetti of the New York Yankees in 1986.
- September 14 – Ken Griffey and Ken Griffey Jr. hit back-to-back home runs for the Seattle Mariners in a 7–5 loss to the California Angels. Pitcher Kirk McCaskill gives up the historic home runs.
- September 15 – Bobby Thigpen of the Chicago White Sox saves his fiftieth game, becoming the first pitcher to reach that mark. The White Sox defeat the Boston Red Sox 7–5.
- September 22 – Andre Dawson of the Chicago Cubs steals his 300th base in an 11–5 loss to the New York Mets, becoming only the second player in major league history with 300 home runs, 300 steals and 2,000 hits. Willie Mays is the first, though they will later be joined by Barry Bonds.
- September 25 – The Oakland Athletics secure their third straight American League West championship with a 5–0 shutout of the Royals in Kansas City. The A's would finish with the best record in baseball at 103–59, the third consecutive year they have done so.
- September 29 – While waiting through a rain delay, the Cincinnati Reds watch the Los Angeles Dodgers lose to the San Francisco Giants 4–3, which clinches the National League West Division for the Reds. The Reds are the first National League team to lead their division wire-to-wire since the inception of the 162-game season in 1962.
- September 30 – Harold Reynolds of the Seattle Mariners grounds out; shortstop Scott Fletcher to first baseman Steve Lyons, giving the Chicago White Sox a 2–1 victory in the final game to ever be played at historic Comiskey Park. Bobby Thigpen is on the mound to earn his 57th save, establishing a (since broken) Major League record for saves in a season.
- October 3 – On the final day of the regular season, the Boston Red Sox clinch their third American League East title in five years with a 3–1 defeat of the Chicago White Sox. Tom Brunansky seals the win for the Red Sox with a sliding catch in the right field corner with the tying runs on base for the White Sox.
- October 20 – The talk of an Oakland Athletics dynasty is proven premature, as the Cincinnati Reds beat Oakland 2–1 to complete one of the most stunning sweeps in World Series history. Series MVP José Rijo (2–0, 0.59 ERA) retires the last 20 batters he faces to give the Reds their first World Championship since 1976. Not joining the celebration at the end is Eric Davis, who ruptures his kidney diving for a ball during the game and is taken to the hospital. It took Davis several years to fully recover.
- December 6 – At Herman Darvick Autograph Auctions in New York City, Shoeless Joe Jackson's signature is sold for $23,100, the most money ever paid for a 19th or 20th-century signature. Jackson, who could not read or write, copied the signature from one written out by his wife. The signature, which is resold within hours, was cut from a legal document.
- December 18 – The National League announces the six finalist cities for the two expansion clubs that will join the league in 1993: Buffalo, Denver, Miami, Orlando, Tampa-St. Petersburg and Washington, D.C.
