= 1979 National League Championship Series =

11th edition of Major League Baseball's National League Championship Series

Team (Wins)	Managers	Season
Pittsburgh Pirates (3)	Chuck Tanner	98–64, .605, GA: 2
Cincinnati Reds (0)	John McNamara	90–71, .559, GA: 1½
- Dates: October 2–5
- MVP: Willie Stargell (Pittsburgh)
- Umpires: John Kibler (crew chief); Ed Montague; Jerry Dale; Frank Pulli; Dick Stello; Jim Quick

Broadcast
- Television: NBC; KDKA-TV (PIT); WLWT (CIN)
- TV announcers: NBC: Joe Garagiola, Tony Kubek and Don Sutton; KDKA-TV: Milo Hamilton, Lanny Frattare and Nelson Briles; WLWT: Ray Lane and Bill Brown
- Radio: CBS; KDKA (PIT); WLW (CIN)
- Radio announcers: CBS Radio: Jack Buck and Jerry Coleman; KDKA: Milo Hamilton and Lanny Frattare; WLW: Marty Brennaman and Joe Nuxhall

The 1979 National League Championship Series was the semifinal round of the National League side of the 1979 Major League Baseball postseason, played between the National League West champion Cincinnati Reds and the National League East champion Pittsburgh Pirates. This was the 11th edition of the NLCS.

It was the fourth time in the 1970s that the Pirates and Reds had faced off for the pennant; Cincinnati had won all three previous NLCS meetings in 1970, 1972, and 1975. The Pirates won the series in a three-game sweep in what would be the last postseason appearance for both franchises until 1990.

As of 2026, this is the last time that the Pirates won the National League pennant, and is their third-most recent victory in a postseason series. Aside from the Seattle Mariners, the only team left that has yet to win a pennant, the Pirates currently hold the longest active league pennant drought in MLB.

== Summary ==
=== Pittsburgh Pirates vs. Cincinnati Reds ===
Pittsburgh won the series, 3–0.

Game	Date	Score	Location	Time	Attendance
1	October 2	Pittsburgh Pirates – 5, Cincinnati Reds – 2 (11)	Riverfront Stadium	3:14	55,006
2	October 3	Pittsburgh Pirates – 3, Cincinnati Reds – 2 (10)	Riverfront Stadium	3:24	55,000
3	October 5	Cincinnati Reds – 1, Pittsburgh Pirates – 7	Three Rivers Stadium	2:45	42,240

== Game summaries ==
=== Game 1 ===
October 2, 1979 8:30 pm (ET) at Riverfront Stadium in Cincinnati, Ohio 54 °F (12 °C), partly cloudy
Team	1	2	3	4	5	6	7	8	9	10	11	R	H	E
Pittsburgh	0	0	2	0	0	0	0	0	0	0	3	5	10	0
Cincinnati	0	0	0	2	0	0	0	0	0	0	0	2	7	0
WP: Grant Jackson (1–0) LP: Tom Hume (0–1) Sv: Don Robinson (1); Home runs: PIT: Phil Garner (1), Willie Stargell (1); CIN: George Foster (1)

Both sides threw their aces in Game 1, as 14-game winner John Candelaria started for the Pirates against Tom Seaver for the Reds. After Omar Moreno grounded out to start the game, a 45-minute rain delay stalled the contest. When play resumed, Seaver retired Tim Foli and Dave Parker for an unusually long 1-2-3 inning.

Pittsburgh struck first when second baseman Phil Garner led off the third inning with an opposite-field home run. After Candelaria struck out, Moreno hit a sinking liner to right that Dave Collins attempted a sliding shoestring catch on. The ball skidded off the wet Riverfront Stadium turf in front of Collins and rolled to the wall. The speedy Moreno ended up with a triple, but it could have easily been an inside-the-park homer if not for the hustle of Héctor Cruz in center. Foli then drove in Moreno with a sacrifice fly to give the Pirates a 2–0 lead. Seaver then walked Dave Parker and Willie Stargell, but John Milner popped out to end the inning. The Reds tied the game in the bottom of the fourth when George Foster hit a two-run homer into left center with Dave Concepción aboard. Despite a sore shoulder, Candelaria gutted out seven painful innings before giving way to Enrique Romo.

The score stayed at 2–2 until the top of the 11th inning. Foli and Parker singled off Reds reliever Tom Hume, and Stargell drilled a three-run homer to almost dead center to give the Pirates a 5–2 lead. The Reds did not go away silently, though. After Grant Jackson retired the first two batters in the bottom of the 11th, Concepción singled and Foster walked. Don Robinson came on to replace Jackson and walked Johnny Bench to load the bases. At that point, Pittsburgh manager Chuck Tanner visited the mound, and Stargell jokingly asked Robinson, "Why don't you move to first and I'll pitch?" The barb relaxed Robinson, who settled down and struck out Ray Knight for the final out.

=== Game 2 ===
October 3, 1979 3:15 pm (ET) at Riverfront Stadium in Cincinnati, Ohio 63 °F (17 °C), mostly cloudy
Team	1	2	3	4	5	6	7	8	9	10	R	H	E
Pittsburgh	0	0	0	1	1	0	0	0	0	1	3	11	0
Cincinnati	0	1	0	0	0	0	0	0	1	0	2	8	0
WP: Don Robinson (1–0) LP: Doug Bair (0–1)

In another extra inning affair, the Pirates beat the Reds 3–2 to earn a road sweep and send the series to Pittsburgh needing just one win in three home games to make the 1979 World Series. The starting pitchers were Jim Bibby for the Pirates and Frank Pastore for the Reds.

Pastore helped himself with an RBI sacrifice fly to center in the bottom of the second that scored Dan Driessen. Driessen was aboard after singling and moving to third on a Ray Knight single. The Reds threatened in the bottom of the third when Dave Concepcion doubled with one out and George Foster walked. Concepcion tried to steal third, but was gunned out by Pirate catcher Ed Ott. Johnny Bench popped out to end the threat.

In the top of the fourth, Tim Foli and Dave Parker led off with singles. Willie Stargell followed with a drive to the left field wall over Foster's head in left. Foli, however, only made it to third base as he was running cautiously in case the ball was caught (and, subsequently, Parker only made it to second). Stargell, however, rounded first and made it all the way to second, but with Parker occupying second, he was thrown out by Concepcion while trying to retreat to first. With first base now open, John Milner was walked intentionally, loading the bases, and Bill Madlock beat out a double-play grounder to score Foli with the tying run.

The Pirates took the lead in the fifth when Phil Garner sent a sinking liner towards Dave Collins in right that Collins attempted a shoestring catch on, much like his attempt in Game 1. Collins appeared to have caught the ball, but umpire Frank Pulli ruled he trapped it, giving Garner a base hit. Garner moved to second on a sacrifice bunt by Bibby (which Bibby almost beat out due to a bad throw by Knight) and scored on a double by Foli.

The Reds squelched a scoring threat in the top of the seventh when Ott led off with a single and was sacrificed to second by Bibby. Ott tried to score on a base hit by Omar Moreno but was thrown out at the plate by Foster. Bibby left after seven innings with discomfort in his neck, having held the Reds to four hits and the single run.

The Reds mounted a threat in the eighth against the Pirate bullpen. Left-hander Grant Jackson retired lefty-hitting Joe Morgan for the first out, but Chuck Tanner, managing by percentages, brought in Enrique Romo to face right-handed hitting Concepción. The move backfired as Romo gave up back-to-back singles to Concepción and Foster. Kent Tekulve relieved Romo to face Johnny Bench and, on his second pitch to Bench, wild-pitched the runners to second and third. Tekulve recovered to strike out Bench, intentionally walked Dan Driessen, and then retired Ray Knight for the last out.

Tekulve encountered trouble in the ninth. With one out, Héctor Cruz, batting for Tom Hume, doubled. Collins then doubled in Cruz to tie the game. Tekulve was then replaced by lefty Dave Roberts, but Roberts walked Morgan. Tanner then brought in Game 1 saver Don Robinson, who struck out Concepción and retired Foster on a groundout to end the threat.

The Pirates won it in the tenth when Moreno singled, went to second on a bunt by Foli and scored on Parker's single. Robinson retired the Reds in the tenth and the Pirates had a two games to none lead over the Reds. Robinson got the win and Doug Bair got the loss.

=== Game 3 ===
October 5, 1979 3:15 pm (ET) at Three Rivers Stadium in Pittsburgh, Pennsylvania 52 °F (11 °C), overcast
Team	1	2	3	4	5	6	7	8	9	R	H	E
Cincinnati	0	0	0	0	0	1	0	0	0	1	8	1
Pittsburgh	1	1	2	2	0	0	0	1	X	7	7	0
WP: Bert Blyleven (1–0) LP: Mike LaCoss (0–1); Home runs: CIN: Johnny Bench (1); PIT: Willie Stargell (2), Bill Madlock (1)

The Pirates made it to their first World Series since 1971 with a blowout win to complete a three-game sweep of the Reds. The starting pitchers were Bert Blyleven for the Pirates, and Mike LaCoss for the Reds. For the second time in three games, the start was delayed by rain.

After allowing a hit in the first, the Pirates got on the board quickly when leadoff hitter Omar Moreno, a pain in the Reds' side all series, singled and stole second. Tim Foli then grounded to Concepcion, who tried to catch Moreno at third, but Moreno reached third safely and Foli to first. Dave Parker then hit a sacrifice fly for a 1–0 Pirates lead.

In the second, Phil Garner tripled and scored on Foli's sacrifice fly. LaCoss was then replaced by Fred Norman, who gave up Willie Stargell's second home run of the series and another homer to Bill Madlock in the third. Stargell doubled home two more runs in the fourth for a 6–0 Pirate lead and essentially clinched the NLCS MVP.

The Reds got one run back in the sixth when Johnny Bench homered, but it was their last run of the year. The Pirates got that run back in the eighth when Garner scored on an error by Cesar Geronimo, the only error committed in the entire series. Blyleven went the distance and the Pirates had completed an unexpected sweep in advancing to the 1979 World Series. To date, this is the Pirates' most recent pennant.

== Composite box ==
1979 NLCS (3–0): Pittsburgh Pirates over Cincinnati Reds

Team	1	2	3	4	5	6	7	8	9	10	11	R	H	E
Pittsburgh Pirates	1	1	4	3	1	0	0	1	0	1	3	15	28	0
Cincinnati Reds	0	1	0	2	0	1	0	0	1	0	0	5	23	1
Total attendance: 152,246 Average attendance: 50,749

== Aftermath ==
Pittsburgh went on to face the Baltimore Orioles in the World Series, where they rallied from a 3–1 deficit in games to win a seven-game Series. Pittsburgh won the final two games on the road, the last team to achieve that until the 2016 Chicago Cubs.

Game 3 was Joe Morgan's last game with the Reds. The 1975 and 1976 National League MVP signed with the Houston Astros, the same team that had traded him to Cincinnati in 1971, in the off-season. The 1980 Reds were still competitive, but finished 3½ games behind Morgan's Astros in the National League West. Morgan was reunited with former Cincinnati teammates Pete Rose and Tony Pérez after an off-season trade to the Philadelphia Phillies in 1982. The lineup was dubbed the "Wheeze Kids", referring to the considerable age in their starting lineup, in which just one starting player was under 30 years old. The Phillies lost the World Series that season to the Orioles in a hard-fought five-game series. It was the last World Series for Morgan, Rose, and Perez as players, although Perez was the hitting coach for the Reds when they won the World Series in 1990.

1979 was the last hurrah for the Pirates and Reds. When the 1970s disappeared, so did both teams from the postseason stage, with no playoff appearances from either team in the 1980s. Coincidentally, they each came back in the same year, 1990, when they met in the National League Championship Series, with Cincinnati winning the series and later the World Series. The two teams would later meet in the 2013 National League Wild Card Game, which was won by the Pirates in their first playoff win since the 1979 World Series. As of 2026, the Pirates have not won another pennant.
