= Omar Moreno =

Panamanian baseball player (born 1952)

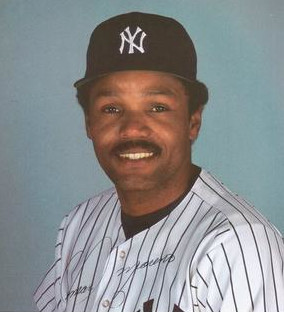
- Moreno in 1984
- Center fielder
- Born: October 24, 1952 (age 73); Puerto Armuelles, Panama
- Batted: Left Threw: Left

MLB debut
- September 6, 1975, for the Pittsburgh Pirates

Last MLB appearance
- October 5, 1986, for the Atlanta Braves

MLB statistics
- Batting average: .252
- Home runs: 37
- Runs batted in: 386
- Stolen bases: 487
- Stats at Baseball Reference

Teams
- Pittsburgh Pirates (1975–1982); Houston Astros (1983); New York Yankees (1983–1985); Kansas City Royals (1985); Atlanta Braves (1986)

Career highlights and awards
- World Series champion (1979); 2× NL stolen base leader (1978, 1979)

Omar Renán Moreno Quintero (born October 24, 1952) is a Panamanian former center fielder who played from 1975 through 1986 in Major League Baseball. He was best known for his years with the Pittsburgh Pirates, and was the starting center fielder and leadoff hitter on their 1979 World Series champion team.

== Career ==
Moreno made his first appearance with the Pirates in September 1975, and became the team's starting center fielder in 1977. He had great speed and led the National League in stolen bases in 1978 and 1979. In 1980, he set the Pirates' single-season record for stolen bases with 96. Although he had no stolen bases in the 1979 World Series, he hit .333 in the leadoff spot during the Series.

Moreno played every game of the 1979 and 1980 seasons and led the National League in at bats both years.

His 96 stolen bases in 1980 are the most by any player not to lead the majors in steals on the season. Ron LeFlore edged him out by stealing 97 bases.

After the 1982 season, Moreno signed as a free agent with the Houston Astros. He was traded midway through the 1983 season to the New York Yankees in exchange for Jerry Mumphrey. After the Yankees released him in August 1985, he signed with the Kansas City Royals for the last month of the season, and finished his career with the Atlanta Braves in 1986.

Moreno managed Panama at the 2003 Baseball World Cup.

== Personal ==
Moreno has returned to Panama since his retirement. He and his wife Sandra have run the Omar Moreno Foundation, a youth baseball charity for underprivileged kids in Panama. Moreno assumed the title of Secretary of Sports, a position created by then-President-elect Ricardo Martinelli in May 2009.

He considered a whistle used by his wife Sandra to be his most valuable heirloom from his playing days. The whistle made a very loud noise and was a common sound during the 1979 World Series broadcasts.

Moreno made a cameo appearance in the Mexican movie El Hombre de la Mandolina, which was nominated for a Silver Ariel in 1985. He appeared in an uncredited role on the show Space Ghost: Coast To Coast along with fellow major leaguer Mookie Wilson in an episode called "Chinatown".

== See also ==
- List of Major League Baseball annual stolen base leaders
- List of Major League Baseball annual triples leaders
- List of Major League Baseball career stolen bases leaders
