= 1975 National League Championship Series =

7th edition of Major League Baseball's National League Championship Series

Team (Wins)	Managers	Season
Cincinnati Reds (3)	Sparky Anderson	108–54, .667, GA: 20
Pittsburgh Pirates (0)	Danny Murtaugh	92–69, .571, GA: 6½
- Dates: October 4–7
- Umpires: John Kibler; Andy Olsen; Frank Pulli; Billy Williams; Tom Gorman (crew chief); Art Williams

Broadcast
- Television: NBC; WLWT (CIN); KDKA-TV (PIT)
- TV announcers: NBC: Joe Garagiola and Maury Wills (in Cincinnati); Curt Gowdy and Tony Kubek (in Pittsburgh); WLWT: Ken Coleman and Woody Woodward; KDKA-TV: Bob Prince and Nellie King

The 1975 National League Championship Series was a best-of-five match-up in Major League Baseball’s 1975 postseason between the East Division champion Pittsburgh Pirates and the West Division champion Cincinnati Reds. It was the seventh NLCS in all. The Reds swept the Pirates in three games and went on to win the World Series against the Boston Red Sox.

== Summary ==
=== Pittsburgh Pirates vs. Cincinnati Reds ===
Cincinnati won the series, 3–0.

Game	Date	Score	Location	Time	Attendance
1	October 4	Pittsburgh Pirates – 3, Cincinnati Reds – 8	Riverfront Stadium	3:00	54,633
2	October 5	Pittsburgh Pirates – 1, Cincinnati Reds – 6	Riverfront Stadium	2:51	54,752
3	October 7	Cincinnati Reds – 5, Pittsburgh Pirates – 3 (10)	Three Rivers Stadium	2:47	46,355

== Game summaries ==
=== Game 1 ===
October 4, 1975 4:00 pm (ET) at Riverfront Stadium in Cincinnati, Ohio 69 °F (21 °C) mostly clear
Team	1	2	3	4	5	6	7	8	9	R	H	E
Pittsburgh	0	2	0	0	0	0	0	0	1	3	8	0
Cincinnati	0	1	3	0	4	0	0	0	X	8	11	0
WP: Don Gullett (1–0) LP: Jerry Reuss (0–1); Home runs: PIT: None; CIN: Don Gullett (1)

The Pirates struck first in the second off Don Gullett when he hit Dave Parker with a pitch with two outs before Richie Hebner's double and Frank Taveras's single scored a run each, but in the bottom half, Gullett's RBI single off Jerry Reuss with two on cut the Pirates' lead to 2–1. Next inning, after two walks, Tony Perez's RBI single tied the game and two outs later, Ken Griffey's two-run single put the Reds up 4–2. In the fifth, the Reds loaded the bases with no outs off Larry Demery on a walk and two singles before Griffey's sacrifice fly and Cesar Geronimo's groundout scored a run each. Gullett's home run then made it 8–2. Bob Robertson's two-out RBI single with two on cut the lead to 8–3, but Gullett pitched a complete game to give the Reds a 1–0 series lead.

=== Game 2 ===
October 5, 1975 4:00 pm (ET) at Riverfront Stadium in Cincinnati, Ohio 70 °F (21 °C) overcast
Team	1	2	3	4	5	6	7	8	9	R	H	E
Pittsburgh	0	0	0	1	0	0	0	0	0	1	5	0
Cincinnati	2	0	0	2	0	1	1	0	X	6	12	1
WP: Fred Norman (1–0) LP: Jim Rooker (0–1) Sv: Rawly Eastwick (1); Home runs: PIT: None; CIN: Tony Pérez (1)

Tony Pérez's two-run home run in the first off Jim Rooker gave the Reds a lead they never relinquished. The Pirates cut it to 2–1 in the fourth off Fred Norman when Willie Stargell hit a leadoff double, moved to third on a wild pitch and after a walk, scored on Richie Hebner's groundout, but in the bottom half, three straight leadoff singles gave the Reds that run back. After a double steal, Norman's sacrifice fly extended their lead to 4–1. In the sixth, Ken Griffey hit a leadoff single off Kent Tekulve, stole second and third, and scored on Ken Brett's balk. Next inning, Bruce Kison hit Joe Morgan with a pitch to lead off. After stealing second, Morgan scored on Perez's RBI single. Rawly Eastwick pitched three innings of relief as the Reds' 6–1 win gave them a 2–0 series lead.

=== Game 3 ===
October 7, 1975 8:00 pm (ET) at Three Rivers Stadium in Pittsburgh, Pennsylvania 57 °F (14 °C) mostly cloudy
Team	1	2	3	4	5	6	7	8	9	10	R	H	E
Cincinnati	0	1	0	0	0	0	0	2	0	2	5	6	0
Pittsburgh	0	0	0	0	0	2	0	0	1	0	3	7	2
WP: Rawly Eastwick (1–0) LP: Ramón Hernández (0–1) Sv: Pedro Borbón (1); Home runs: CIN: Dave Concepción (1), Pete Rose (1); PIT: Al Oliver (1)

The only drama of the Series came in Game 3 played at Pittsburgh's Three Rivers Stadium.

The home team sent left-hander John Candelaria to the hill to try to stem the Red tide and the 21-year-old rookie responded magnificently. He yielded a home run to Dave Concepción in the second inning, but going into the eighth had a 2–1 lead, the result of Al Oliver's two-run homer in the Pirate sixth inning off Gary Nolan. Candelaria struck out the first two batters in the eighth. That gave him a total of 14 for the game, a new playoff record. Concepción's circuit clout had been the only Reds hit to that point.

But, inexplicably, he lost his control and walked Merv Rettenmund, a pinch-hitter. Pete Rose then blasted a home run to put the Reds ahead, 3–2. When Joe Morgan followed Rose's homer with a double, Candelaria left the game. The Pirates tied the game in the ninth when relief pitcher Rawly Eastwick walked in the tying run with two out.

But it all served merely to delay the inevitable. The Reds got three hits and two runs off veteran Ramón Hernández, the third Pittsburgh hurler, in the top of the tenth. Ken Griffey hit leadoff single, moved to second on a balk, then to third on a groundout before scoring on Ed Armbrister's sacrifice fly. Pete Rose singled before Morgan's RBI double padded the Reds' lead to 5–3. Pedro Borbon retired the Pirates in order in the bottom of the inning as the Reds clinched their third pennant of the decade.

This game, and Game 3 of the 1975 American League Championship Series, were the first league championship series games played at night. Both were regionally televised by NBC.

== Composite box ==
1975 NLCS (3–0): Cincinnati Reds over Pittsburgh Pirates

Team	1	2	3	4	5	6	7	8	9	10	R	H	E
Cincinnati Reds	2	2	3	2	4	1	1	2	0	2	19	29	1
Pittsburgh Pirates	0	2	0	1	0	2	0	0	2	0	7	20	2
Total attendance: 155,740 Average attendance: 51,913
