= List of Major League Baseball franchise postseason droughts =

Throughout the history of Major League Baseball (MLB), franchises have had various postseason and World Series droughts.

All 16 of the original major league franchises (i.e., those in place when the first World Series was played in 1903) have won the World Series, with the longest wait for a franchise's first championship being for the Phillies (77 seasons, ending in 1980). Since expansion began in 1961, four of the 14 expansion teams have never won the World Series. Furthermore, one franchise, the Cleveland Guardians, currently has a championship drought that predates the expansion era. The three longest championship droughts in history were ended in the 21st century by the Red Sox (85 seasons, ending in 2004), the White Sox (87 seasons, ending in 2005), and the Cubs (107 seasons, ending in 2016).

Only one expansion franchise (the Seattle Mariners) has never won a pennant (i.e., the league championship, the two winners of which meet in the World Series). The three longest pennant droughts in history were recently ended by the Rangers (49 years, starting with the team's foundation and ending in 2010), the Cubs (70 years, ending in 2016), and the Nationals (50 years, starting with the team's foundation and ending in 2019, and including the franchise's entire 36 years as the Montreal Expos). As the Nationals are the third franchise to be based in the city of Washington, their 2019 pennant also ended a drought of 52 seasons played in Washington since their last pennant, which was in 1933 (discounting the 33 seasons during which there was no team in Washington).

As of the 2025 season, every active MLB franchise has qualified for the playoffs, especially since expansion of the playoffs in 1994 made that feat easier. The Angels have the longest active postseason drought at 11 years, while the Cincinnati Reds have the longest active postseason series-win drought at 30 years. Long postseason droughts were ended recently by the Nationals (30 years, ending in 2012), the Pirates (20 years, ending in 2013), the Royals (28 years, ending in 2014), the Blue Jays (21 years, ending in 2015), and the Mariners (20 years, ending in 2022).

This list includes only the modern World Series between the American League (AL) and the National League (NL), not the various 19th-century championship series. Those teams which have never achieved a particular accomplishment in their franchise history are listed by the date they entered the leagues.

== Postseason droughts ==
=== Longest current postseason droughts ===
Seasons	Team	Last appearance
12	Los Angeles Angels	2014 ALDS
11	Pittsburgh Pirates	2015 NL Wild Card
8	Colorado Rockies	2018 NLDS
7	Washington Nationals	2019 World Series
6	Oakland Athletics/Athletics	2020 ALDS
5	San Francisco Giants	2021 NLDS
4	St. Louis Cardinals	2022 NL Wild Card
3	Miami Marlins	2023 NL Wild Card
3	Minnesota Twins	2023 ALDS
3	Texas Rangers	2023 World Series
3	Arizona Diamondbacks	2023 World Series
2	Baltimore Orioles	2024 AL Wild Card
2	Kansas City Royals	2024 ALDS
2	New York Mets	2024 NLCS
1	Cincinnati Reds	2025 NL Wild Card
1	Detroit Tigers	2025 ALDS
1	Seattle Mariners	2025 ALCS
1	Toronto Blue Jays	2025 World Series
0	Boston Red Sox	2026 AL Wild Card
0	Houston Astros	2026 AL Wild Card
0	Chicago Cubs	2026 NL Wild Card
0	Philadelphia Phillies	2026 NL Wild Card
0	Chicago White Sox	2026 ALDS
0	New York Yankees	2026 ALDS
0	Atlanta Braves	2026 NLDS
0	San Diego Padres	2026 NLDS
0	Cleveland Guardians	2026 ALCS
0	Los Angeles Dodgers	2026 NLCS
0	Milwaukee Brewers	2026 World Series
0	Tampa Bay Rays	2026 World Series

=== Longest postseason droughts in the expanded-postseason era ===
After the postseason was expanded in 1995 to include eight teams (further expanded in 2012 to ten teams and again expanded in 2022 to 12 teams, including a 16-team postseason in 2020), 18 of the 30 teams qualified within the first five years, and few teams went for long droughts without at least participating in the first round of the postseason. This list only shows droughts of 15 or more seasons that occurred primarily in the expanded-postseason era. Active droughts are listed in bold type.

Seasons	Team	Previous appearance	Next appearance
30	Montreal Expos/Washington Nationals	1981	2012
28	Kansas City Royals	1985	2014
25	Milwaukee Brewers	1982	2008
21	Toronto Blue Jays	1993	2015
20	Pittsburgh Pirates	1992	2013
20	Seattle Mariners	2001	2022
18	Detroit Tigers	1987	2006
16	Florida/Miami Marlins	2003	2020
15	California/Anaheim Angels	1986	2002

=== Longest active postseason series win droughts ===
Seasons	Team	Last series won
31	Cincinnati Reds	1995 NLDS
17	Los Angeles Angels	2009 ALDS
13	Pittsburgh Pirates	2013 NL Wild Card
12	Baltimore Orioles	2014 ALDS
10	San Francisco Giants	2016 NL Wild Card
8	Colorado Rockies	2018 NL Wild Card
7	St. Louis Cardinals	2019 NLDS
7	Washington Nationals	2019 World Series
6	Oakland Athletics/Athletics	2020 AL Wild Card
6	Miami Marlins	2020 NL Wild Card
5	Boston Red Sox	2021 ALDS
3	Minnesota Twins	2023 AL Wild Card
3	Houston Astros	2023 ALDS
3	Philadelphia Phillies	2023 NLDS
3	Arizona Diamondbacks	2023 NLCS
3	Texas Rangers	2023 World Series
2	Kansas City Royals	2024 AL Wild Card
2	New York Mets	2024 NLDS
1	Detroit Tigers	2025 AL Wild Card
1	Chicago Cubs	2025 NL Wild Card
1	Seattle Mariners	2025 ALDS
1	Toronto Blue Jays	2025 ALCS
0	Atlanta Braves	2026 NL Wild Card
0	Chicago White Sox	2026 AL Wild Card
0	New York Yankees	2026 AL Wild Card
0	San Diego Padres	2026 NL Wild Card
0	Cleveland Guardians	2026 ALDS
0	Los Angeles Dodgers	2026 NLDS
0	Tampa Bay Rays	2026 ALCS
0	Milwaukee Brewers	2026 World Series

=== Longest postseason game win droughts ===
Games	Seasons	Team	Previous game won	Next game won
18	16	Minnesota Twins	2004 ALDS Game 1	2023 AL Wild Card Series Game 1
13	11	Boston Red Sox	1986 World Series Game 5	1998 ALDS Game 1
11	61	Philadelphia Phillies	1915 World Series Game 1	1977 NLCS Game 1
10	12	Baltimore Orioles	2014 ALDS Game 3	Active
10	33	Milwaukee/Atlanta Braves	1958 World Series Game 4	1991 NLCS Game 2
10	4	Kansas City Royals	1980 World Series Game 4	1985 ALCS Game 3

=== Longest current postseason game win droughts ===
Games	Seasons	Team	Last game won
9	12	Baltimore Orioles	2014 ALDS Game 3
8	14	Cincinnati Reds	2012 NLDS Game 2
6	3	Houston Astros	2023 ALCS Game 5
5	6	Miami Marlins	2020 NL Wild Card Series Game 2
5	6	St. Louis Cardinals	2020 NL Wild Card Series Game 1

== League division champion droughts ==
=== Longest current division champion droughts ===
No league division championships were won in 1994 due to the players' strike that year.

Seasons	Team	Division	Last division champion
34	Colorado Rockies	NL West	Never (franchise began in 1993)
34	Miami Marlins*	NL East	Never (franchise began in 1993)
34	Pittsburgh Pirates	NL Central	1992
20	San Diego Padres	NL West	2006
15	Arizona Diamondbacks	NL West	2011
14	Cincinnati Reds	NL Central	2012
12	Detroit Tigers	AL Central	2014
12	Los Angeles Angels	AL West	2014
11	Kansas City Royals	AL Central	2015
11	New York Mets	NL East	2015
10	Texas Rangers	AL West	2016
9	Washington Nationals	NL East	2017
8	Boston Red Sox	AL East	2018
6	Chicago Cubs	NL Central	2020
6	Oakland Athletics/Athletics	AL West	2020
5	San Francisco Giants	NL West	2021
5	Chicago White Sox	AL Central	2021
4	St. Louis Cardinals	NL Central	2022
3	Baltimore Orioles	AL East	2023
3	Minnesota Twins	AL Central	2023
2	New York Yankees	AL East	2024
1	Philadelphia Phillies	NL East	2025
1	Toronto Blue Jays	AL East	2025
1	Seattle Mariners	AL West	2025
0	Tampa Bay Rays	AL East	2026
0	Cleveland Guardians	AL Central	2026
0	Houston Astros	AL West	2026
0	Atlanta Braves	NL East	2026
0	Milwaukee Brewers	NL Central	2026
0	Los Angeles Dodgers	NL West	2026

* Because of the wild card postseason berth, the franchise has won two World Series championships (1997 and 2003) without winning their division.

=== Longest division championship droughts through history ===
List begins with 1969, the time divisional play started in Major League Baseball. This list only shows droughts of 10 or more seasons. Active droughts are listed in bold type.

Seasons	Team	Previous Division Title	Drought Streak	Next Division Title
**34**	**Colorado Rockies**	—	**1993–2026**	—
**34**	**Florida/Miami Marlins**	—	**1993–2026**	—
**34**	**Pittsburgh Pirates**	**1992**	**1993–2026**	—
30	Montreal Expos/Washington Nationals	1981	1982–2011	2012
29	Kansas City Royals	1985	1986–2014	2015
28	Milwaukee Brewers	1982	1983–2010	2011
27	Washington Senators/Texas Rangers	—	1969–1995	1996
26	Cleveland Indians	—	1969–1994	1995
23	Detroit Tigers	1987	1988–2010	2011
23	Seattle Mariners	2001	2002–2024	2025
21	Toronto Blue Jays	1993	1993–2014	2015
**20**	**San Diego Padres**	**2006**	**2007–2026**	—
18	Seattle Mariners	—	1977–1994	1995
17	California/Anaheim Angels	1986	1987–2003	2004
17	New York Mets	1988	1989–2005	2006
16	Minnesota Twins	1970	1971–1986	1987
16	Baltimore Orioles	1997	1998–2013	2014
15	Chicago Cubs	—	1969–1983	1984
15	San Diego Padres	—	1969–1983	1984
15	San Francisco Giants	1971	1972–1986	1987
15	Houston Astros	2001	2002–2016	2017
**15**	**Arizona Diamondbacks**	**2011**	**2012–2026**	—
14	Chicago White Sox	—	1969–1982	1983
14	New York Yankees	1981	1982–1995	1996
14	Cincinnati Reds	1995	1996–2009	2010
**14**	**Cincinnati Reds**	**2012**	**2013–2026**	—
13	St. Louis Cardinals	—	1969–1981	1982
13	Baltimore Orioles	1983	1984–1996	1997
13	Chicago Cubs	1989	1990–2002	2003
13	Philadelphia Phillies	1993	1994–2006	2007
12	Montreal Expos	—	1969–1980	1981
12	Seattle Pilots/Milwaukee Brewers	—	1969–1980	1981
12	New York Mets	1973	1974–1985	1986
12	Chicago White Sox	2008	2009–2020	2021
12	Atlanta Braves	1969	1970–1981	1982
12	Philadelphia Phillies	2011	2012–2023	2024
**12**	**Detroit Tigers**	**2014**	**2015–2026**	—
**12**	**Los Angeles Angels**	**2014**	**2015–2026**	—
11	Houston Astros	—	1969–1979	1980
11	Detroit Tigers	1972	1973–1983	1984
11	San Diego Padres	1984	1985–1995	1996
11	Boston Red Sox	1995	1996–2006	2007
**11**	**Kansas City Royals**	**2015**	**2016–2026**	—
**11**	**New York Mets**	**2015**	**2016–2026**	—
10	California Angels	—	1969–1978	1979
10	Boston Red Sox	1975	1976–1985	1986
10	Cincinnati Reds	1979	1980–1989	1990
10	Pittsburgh Pirates	1979	1980–1989	1990
10	Houston Astros	1986	1987–1996	1997
10	Minnesota Twins	1991	1992–2001	2002
10	Tampa Bay Devil Rays/Rays	—	1998–2007	2008
10	Texas Rangers	1999	2000–2009	2010
**10**	**Texas Rangers**	**2016**	**2017–2026**	—

== League division series appearance droughts ==
=== Longest current league division series appearance droughts ===
Seasons	Team	Last appearance
14	Cincinnati Reds	2012
13	Pittsburgh Pirates	2013
12	Los Angeles Angels	2014
8	Colorado Rockies	2018
7	St. Louis Cardinals	2019
7	Washington Nationals	2019
6	Oakland Athletics/Athletics	2020
6	Miami Marlins	2020
5	San Francisco Giants	2021
5	Boston Red Sox	2021
3	Houston Astros	2023
3	Arizona Diamondbacks	2023
3	Baltimore Orioles	2023
3	Texas Rangers	2023
3	Minnesota Twins	2023
2	New York Mets	2024
2	Kansas City Royals	2024
1	Toronto Blue Jays	2025
1	Chicago Cubs	2025
1	Seattle Mariners	2025
1	Philadelphia Phillies	2025
1	Detroit Tigers	2025
0	Atlanta Braves	2026
0	Milwaukee Brewers	2026
0	Los Angeles Dodgers	2026
0	Cleveland Guardians	2026
0	San Diego Padres	2026
0	Tampa Bay Rays	2026
0	Chicago White Sox	2026
0	New York Yankees	2026

== League championship appearance droughts ==
=== Longest current league championship appearance droughts ===
No league championships were played in 1994 due to the players' strike that year.

Seasons	Team	Last appearance
34	Pittsburgh Pirates	1992
31	Cincinnati Reds	1995
24	Minnesota Twins	2002
23	Miami Marlins	2003
21	Chicago White Sox	2005
20	Oakland Athletics/Athletics	2006
19	Colorado Rockies	2007
17	Los Angeles Angels	2009
13	Detroit Tigers	2013
12	San Francisco Giants	2014
12	Baltimore Orioles	2014
11	Kansas City Royals	2015
9	Chicago Cubs	2017
7	St. Louis Cardinals	2019
7	Washington Nationals	2019
5	Atlanta Braves	2021
5	Boston Red Sox	2021
4	San Diego Padres	2022
3	Houston Astros	2023
3	Texas Rangers	2023
3	Arizona Diamondbacks	2023
3	Philadelphia Phillies	2023
2	New York Yankees	2024
2	New York Mets	2024
1	Seattle Mariners	2025
1	Toronto Blue Jays	2025
0	Los Angeles Dodgers	2026
0	Tampa Bay Rays	2026
0	Milwaukee Brewers	2026
0	Cleveland Guardians	2026

== World Series appearance droughts ==
=== Longest current World Series appearance droughts ===
No World Series was played in 1994 due to the players' strike that year.

Seasons	Team	Last World Series appearance
50	Seattle Mariners	Never (franchise started in 1977)
47	Pittsburgh Pirates	1979
43	Baltimore Orioles	1983
36	Cincinnati Reds	1990
36	Athletics	1990
35	Minnesota Twins	1991
28	San Diego Padres	1998
24	Los Angeles Angels	2002
23	Miami Marlins	2003
21	Chicago White Sox	2005
19	Colorado Rockies	2007
14	Detroit Tigers	2012
13	St. Louis Cardinals	2013
12	San Francisco Giants	2014
11	Kansas City Royals	2015
11	New York Mets	2015
10	Chicago Cubs	2016
10	Cleveland Guardians	2016
8	Boston Red Sox	2018
7	Washington Nationals	2019
5	Atlanta Braves	2021
4	Houston Astros	2022
4	Philadelphia Phillies	2022
3	Arizona Diamondbacks	2023
3	Texas Rangers	2023
2	New York Yankees	2024
1	Los Angeles Dodgers	2025
1	Toronto Blue Jays	2025
0	Milwaukee Brewers	2026
0	Tampa Bay Rays	2026

=== Longest major league pennant droughts through history ===
List begins with 1903, about the time the current configuration of National League and American League stabilized and also the year of the first World Series. No pennants were won in 1994 due to the players strike that year. This list only shows droughts of 20 or more seasons. Active droughts are in boldface.

Seasons	Team	Previous Pennant	Drought Streak	Next Pennant
70	Chicago Cubs	1945	1946–2015	2016
50	Montreal Expos/Washington Nationals	—	1969–2018	2019
**50**	**Seattle Mariners**	—	**1977–2026**	—
49	Washington Senators/Texas Rangers	—	1961–2009	2010
**47**	**Pittsburgh Pirates**	**1979**	**1980–2026**	—
45	Chicago White Sox	1959	1960–2004	2005
43	Houston Colt .45s/Astros	—	1962–2004	2005
43	Milwaukee Brewers	1982	1983–2025	2026
**43**	**Baltimore Orioles**	**1983**	**1984–2026**	—
41	St. Louis Browns	—	1903–1943	1944
41	Los Angeles/California/Anaheim Angels	—	1961–2001	2002
40	Philadelphia/Kansas City/Oakland Athletics	1931	1932–1971	1972
40	Cleveland Indians	1954	1955–1994	1995
39	Chicago White Sox	1919	1920–1958	1959
**36**	**Cincinnati Reds**	**1990**	**1991–2026**	—
**36**	**Oakland Athletics/Athletics**	**1990**	**1991–2026**	—
**35**	**Minnesota Twins**	**1991**	**1992–2026**	—
34	Philadelphia Phillies	1915	1916–1949	1950
33	Boston Braves	1914	1915–1947	1948
32	Pittsburgh Pirates	1927	1928–1959	1960
32	Milwaukee/Atlanta Braves	1958	1959–1990	1991
31	Washington Senators/Minnesota Twins	1933	1934–1964	1965
31	Toronto Blue Jays	1993	1994–2024	2025
29	Philadelphia Phillies	1950	1951–1979	1980
28	Kansas City Royals	1985	1986–2013	2014
28	Los Angeles Dodgers	1988	1989–2016	2017
**28**	**San Diego Padres**	**1998**	**1999–2026**	—
27	Boston Red Sox	1918	1919–1945	1946
27	Cleveland Indians	1920	1921–1947	1948
26	San Francisco Giants	1962	1963–1988	1989
24	Detroit Tigers	1909	1910–1933	1934
**24**	**Anaheim/Los Angeles Angels** (Note: Known as the Los Angeles Angels of Anaheim from 2005 to 2015)	**2002**	**2003–2026**	—
23	St. Louis Cardinals	—	1903–1925	1926
**23**	**Florida/Miami Marlins**	**2003**	**2004–2026**	—
22	Detroit Tigers	1945	1946–1967	1968
21	Washington Senators	—	1903–1923	1924
21	St. Louis Browns/Baltimore Orioles	1944	1945–1965	1966
21	Minnesota Twins	1965	1966–1986	1987
21	Detroit Tigers	1984	1985–2005	2006
21	Atlanta Braves	1999	2000–2020	2021
21	Arizona Diamondbacks	2001	2002–2022	2023
**21**	**Chicago White Sox**	**2005**	**2006–2026**	—
20	Brooklyn Dodgers	1920	1921–1940	1941
20	Cincinnati Reds	1940	1941–1960	1961
20	Boston Red Sox	1946	1947–1966	1967

=== Major league pennant droughts by city/region ===
This list only includes cities/regions with current Major League Baseball franchises. Years during which a city/region did not field a Major League Baseball team are not counted.

Region	Drought (seasons)	Last pennant
Seattle	51* †	None
Pittsburgh	47	Pittsburgh Pirates, 1979
Baltimore	43	Baltimore Orioles, 1983
Cincinnati	36	Cincinnati Reds, 1990
Minneapolis–Saint Paul	35	Minnesota Twins, 1991
San Diego	28	San Diego Padres, 1998
Miami–Fort Lauderdale	23	Florida Marlins, 2003
Denver	19	Colorado Rockies, 2007
Detroit	14	Detroit Tigers, 2012
St. Louis	13	St. Louis Cardinals, 2013
San Francisco Bay Area	12	San Francisco Giants, 2014
Kansas City	11	Kansas City Royals, 2015
Chicago	10	Chicago Cubs, 2016
Cleveland	10	Cleveland Indians, 2016
Boston	8	Boston Red Sox, 2018
Washington, D.C.	7	Washington Nationals, 2019
Atlanta	5	Atlanta Braves, 2021
Houston	4	Houston Astros, 2022
Philadelphia	4	Philadelphia Phillies, 2022
Phoenix	3	Arizona Diamondbacks, 2023
Dallas–Fort Worth	3	Texas Rangers, 2023
New York City	2	New York Yankees, 2024
Los Angeles	1	Los Angeles Dodgers, 2025
Toronto	1	Toronto Blue Jays, 2025
Milwaukee	0	Milwaukee Brewers, 2026
Tampa–St. Petersburg	0	Tampa Bay Rays, 2026

*city without Major League Baseball franchise for 7 seasons (1970‍–‍1976)

†number does not indicate a pennant won, but rather total seasons played.

== World Series championship droughts ==
=== Longest current World Series championship droughts ===
The Commissioner's Trophy was introduced during the 1967 World Series.
No World Series was played in 1994, and counts as a drought season for those franchises.

Seasons	Team	Last World Series championship won	Last World Series appearance
78	Cleveland Indians/Guardians	1948	2016
58	San Diego Padres	Never (franchise began 1969)	1998
50	Seattle Mariners	Never (franchise began 1977)	Never
47	Pittsburgh Pirates	1979	1979
43	Baltimore Orioles	1983	1983
42	Detroit Tigers	1984	2012
40	New York Mets	1986	2015
37	Oakland Athletics/Athletics	1989	1990
36	Cincinnati Reds	1990	1990
35	Minnesota Twins	1991	1991
34	Colorado Rockies	Never (franchise began 1993)	2007
33	Toronto Blue Jays	1993	2025
29	Tampa Bay Rays	Never (franchise began 1998)	2026
25	Arizona Diamondbacks	2001	2023
24	Los Angeles Angels	2002	2002
23	Miami Marlins	2003	2003
21	Chicago White Sox	2005	2005
18	Philadelphia Phillies	2008	2022
17	New York Yankees	2009	2024
15	St. Louis Cardinals	2011	2013
12	San Francisco Giants	2014	2014
11	Kansas City Royals	2015	2015
10	Chicago Cubs	2016	2016
8	Boston Red Sox	2018	2018
7	Washington Nationals	2019	2019
5	Atlanta Braves	2021	2021
4	Houston Astros	2022	2022
3	Texas Rangers	2023	2023
1	Los Angeles Dodgers	2025	2025
0	Milwaukee Brewers	2026	2026

=== Longest World Series championship droughts through history ===
The first World Series was played in 1903. No World Series was played in 1904 or 1994. This list only shows droughts of 30 or more seasons. Active droughts are in boldface.

Seasons	Team	Previous Title	Drought Streak	Next Title
107	Chicago Cubs	1908	1909–2015	2016
87	Chicago White Sox	1917	1918–2004	2005
85	Boston Red Sox	1918	1919–2003	2004
**78**	**Cleveland Indians/Guardians**	**1948**	**1949–2026**	—
77	Philadelphia Phillies	—	1903–1979	1980
63	St. Louis Browns/Baltimore Orioles	—	1903–1965	1966
62	Washington Senators/Minnesota Twins	1924	1925–1986	1987
62	Washington Senators/Texas Rangers	—	1961–2022	2023
**58**	**San Diego Padres**	—	**1969–2026**	—
57	Seattle Pilots/Milwaukee Brewers	—	1969–2025	2026
55	New York/San Francisco Giants	1954	1955–2009	2010
55	Houston Colt .45s/Astros	—	1962–2016	2017
52	Brooklyn Dodgers	—	1903–1954	1955
50	Montreal Expos/Washington Nationals	—	1969–2018	2019
**50**	**Seattle Mariners**	—	**1977–2026**	—
**47**	**Pittsburgh Pirates**	**1979**	**1980–2026**	—
**43**	**Baltimore Orioles**	**1983**	**1984–2026**	—
42	Boston/Milwaukee Braves	1914	1915–1956	1957
**42**	**Detroit Tigers**	**1984**	**1985–2026**	—
41	Philadelphia/Kansas City/Oakland Athletics	1930	1931–1971	1972
41	Los Angeles/California/Anaheim Angels	—	1961–2001	2002
**40**	**New York Mets**	**1986**	**1987–2026**	—
37	Milwaukee/Atlanta Braves	1957	1958–1994	1995
**37**	**Oakland Athletics/Athletics**	**1989**	**1990–2026**	—
**36**	**Cincinnati Reds**	**1990**	**1991–2026**	—
**35**	**Minnesota Twins**	**1991**	**1992–2026**	—
34	Pittsburgh Pirates	1925	1926–1959	1960
34	Cincinnati Reds	1940	1941–1974	1975
**34**	**Colorado Rockies**	—	**1993–2026**	—
32	Detroit Tigers	—	1903–1934	1935
**33**	**Toronto Blue Jays**	**1993**	**1994–2026**	—
31	Los Angeles Dodgers	1988	1989–2019	2020

=== World Series championship droughts by city/region ===
This list only includes cities/regions with current Major League Baseball franchises. Years during which a city/region did not field a Major League Baseball team are not counted.

Region	Drought (seasons)	Last World Series title
Cleveland	78	Cleveland Indians, 1948
San Diego	58‡	None
Seattle	51† ‡	None
Pittsburgh	47	Pittsburgh Pirates, 1979
Baltimore	43	Baltimore Orioles, 1983
Detroit	42	Detroit Tigers, 1984
Cincinnati	36	Cincinnati Reds, 1990
Minneapolis–Saint Paul	35	Minnesota Twins, 1991
Denver	34‡	None
Toronto	33	Toronto Blue Jays, 1993
Tampa–St. Petersburg	29‡	None
Phoenix	25	Arizona Diamondbacks, 2001
Miami–Fort Lauderdale	23	Florida Marlins, 2003
Philadelphia	18	Philadelphia Phillies, 2008
New York City	17	New York Yankees, 2009
St. Louis	15	St. Louis Cardinals, 2011
San Francisco Bay Area	12	San Francisco Giants, 2014
Kansas City	11	Kansas City Royals, 2015
Chicago	10	Chicago Cubs, 2016
Boston	8	Boston Red Sox, 2018
Washington, D.C.	7	Washington Nationals, 2019
Atlanta	5	Atlanta Braves, 2021
Houston	4	Houston Astros, 2022
Dallas–Fort Worth	3	Texas Rangers, 2023
Los Angeles	1	Los Angeles Dodgers, 2025
Milwaukee	0	Milwaukee Brewers, 2026

†city without Major League Baseball franchise for 7 seasons (1970‍–‍1976)

‡number does not indicate a title won, but rather total seasons played.

=== World Series in which neither team had previously won a championship ===
In these instances, the World Series matchup ensured that one team would win the first championship in its history. Bold text denotes winning team.

Season	National League	American League
2026	**Milwaukee Brewers**	Tampa Bay Rays
1980	**Philadelphia Phillies**	Kansas City Royals
1920	Brooklyn Robins	**Cleveland Indians**
1909	**Pittsburgh Pirates**	Detroit Tigers
1907	**Chicago Cubs**	Detroit Tigers
1906*	Chicago Cubs	**Chicago White Sox**
1905*	**New York Giants**	Philadelphia Athletics
1903*	Pittsburgh Pirates	**Boston Americans**

*In these cases, each team was making its first World Series appearance.

=== World Series in which neither team had previously lost a championship ===
In these instances, the World Series matchup ensured that one team would lose the first championship in its history.

Season	Won	Lost
1948	Cleveland Indians	Boston Braves
1919	Cincinnati Reds	Chicago White Sox
1916	Boston Red Sox	Brooklyn Robins
1915	Boston Red Sox	Philadelphia Phillies
1906*	Chicago White Sox	Chicago Cubs
1905*	New York Giants	Philadelphia Athletics
1903*	Boston Americans	Pittsburgh Pirates

*In these cases, each team was making its first World Series appearance.

=== World Series in which both teams had ended pennant droughts of 20-plus seasons ===
Season	Won	Drought (seasons)	Lost	Drought (seasons)
2005	Chicago White Sox	45	Houston Astros	43
1948	Cleveland Indians	27	Boston Braves	33

=== World Series in which neither franchise had won a championship in 30-plus seasons ===
Bold denotes team that won.

Season	American League	Drought (seasons)	National League	Drought (seasons)
2016	Cleveland Indians	67	**Chicago Cubs**	107
2010	Texas Rangers	49*	**San Francisco Giants**	55
2005	**Chicago White Sox**	87	Houston Astros	43*
2002	**Anaheim Angels**	41*	San Francisco Giants	47
1995	Cleveland Indians	46	**Atlanta Braves**	37
1975	Boston Red Sox	56	**Cincinnati Reds**	34
1972	**Oakland Athletics**	40	Cincinnati Reds	31

Numbers marked with * indicates that the number is counted from either the franchise's first year of existence or the first year of the modern World Series (1903).

=== World Series Championship droughts by division ===
Division	Last World Series championship	Seasons
American League Central	2015 — Royals	11
American League East	2018 — Red Sox	8
National League East	2021 — Braves	5
American League West	2023 — Rangers	3
National League West	2025 — Dodgers	1
National League Central	2026 — Brewers	0

=== Closest approaches without winning the World Series ===
Team	Wild Card Series appearances	Division Series appearances	Championship Series appearances	World Series appearances	Fewest wins short of World Series Title
Tampa Bay Rays	5	8	3	3	2 wins short: 2020
San Diego Padres	5	8	3	2	3 wins short: 1984
Colorado Rockies	2	4	1	1	4 wins short: 2007
Seattle Mariners	1	6	4	0	5 wins short: 2025

== Historical team droughts ==
=== Most consecutive postseason series losses in team history ===
This is a sortable table of all 30 current MLB teams. Four teams have multiple losing streaks where they lost an equal number of post season series before breaking the drought.

Updated through the 2026 Major League Baseball postseason.

^	Denotes active drought

Team	Streak lasted	Last series win	Series lost	Postseason series losses	Opponent	Next series win
Arizona Diamondbacks	9 years	2007 NLDS	2	2007 NLCS; 2017 NLDS	Rockies; Brewers	2017 NL Wild Card
Athletics; 2 (6 loss) streaks	15 years	1990 ALCS	6	1990 World Series; 1992 ALCS; 2000 ALDS; 2001 ALDS; 2002 ALDS; 2003 ALDS	Reds; Blue Jays; Yankees; Yankees; Twins; Red Sox	2006 ALDS
Athletics; 2 (6 loss) streaks	13 years	2006 ALDS	6	2006 ALCS; 2012 ALDS; 2013 ALDS; 2014 AL Wild Card; 2018 AL Wild Card; 2019 AL Wild Card	Tigers; Tigers; Tigers; Royals; Yankees; Rays	2020 AL Wild Card
Atlanta Braves	18 years	2001 NLDS	10	2001 NLCS; 2002 NLDS; 2003 NLDS; 2004 NLDS; 2005 NLDS; 2010 NLDS; 2012 NL Wild Card; 2013 NLDS; 2018 NLDS; 2019 NLDS	Diamondbacks; Giants; Cubs; Astros; Astros; Giants; Cardinals; Dodgers; Dodgers; Cardinals	2020 NL Wild Card
Baltimore Orioles ^	12 years	2014 ALDS	4	2014 ALCS; 2016 AL Wild Card; 2023 ALDS; 2024 AL Wild Card	Royals; Blue Jays; Rangers; Royals	TBD
Boston Red Sox	12 years	1986 ALCS	5	1986 World Series; 1988 ALCS; 1990 ALCS; 1995 ALDS; 1998 ALDS	Mets; Athletics; Athletics; Indians; Indians	1999 ALDS
Chicago Cubs	94 years	1908 World Series	10	1910 World Series; 1918 World Series; 1929 World Series; 1932 World Series; 1935 World Series; 1938 World Series; 1945 World Series; 1984 NLCS; 1989 NLCS; 1998 NLDS	Athletics; Red Sox; Athletics; Yankees; Tigers; Yankees; Tigers; Padres; Giants; Braves	2003 NLDS
Chicago White Sox	87 years	1917 World Series	5	1919 World Series; 1959 World Series; 1983 ALCS; 1993 ALCS; 2000 ALDS	Reds; Dodgers; Orioles; Blue Jays; Mariners	2005 ALDS
Cincinnati Reds ^	31 years	1995 NLDS	6	1995 NLCS; 2010 NLDS; 2012 NLDS; 2013 NL Wild Card; 2020 NL Wild Card; 2025 NL Wild Card	Braves; Phillies; Giants; Pirates; Braves; Dodgers	TBD
Cleveland Guardians	5 years	2016 ALCS	4	2016 World Series; 2017 ALDS; 2018 ALDS; 2020 AL Wild Card	Cubs; Yankees; Astros; Yankees	2022 AL Wild Card
Colorado Rockies	10 years	2007 NLCS	3	2007 World Series; 2009 NLDS; 2017 NL Wild Card	Red Sox; Phillies; Diamondbacks	2018 NL Wild Card
Detroit Tigers	32 years	1903 First modern World Series; No Postseason Series Wins until 1935	4	1907 World Series; 1908 World Series; 1909 World Series; 1934 World Series	Cubs; Cubs; Pirates; Cardinals	1935 World Series
Houston Astros	42 years	1962 Enfranchised; No Postseason Series Wins until 2004	7	1980 NLCS; 1981 NLDS; 1986 NLCS; 1997 NLDS; 1998 NLDS; 1999 NLDS; 2001 NLDS	Phillies; Dodgers; Mets; Braves; Padres; Braves; Braves	2004 NLDS
Kansas City Royals; 2 (3 loss) streaks	12 years	1969 Enfranchised; No Postseason Series Wins until 1980	3	1976 ALCS; 1977 ALCS; 1978 ALCS	Yankees; Yankees; Yankees	1980 ALCS
Kansas City Royals; 2 (3 loss) streaks	4 years	1980 ALCS	3	1980 World Series; 1981 ALDS; 1984 ALCS	Phillies; Athletics; Tigers	1985 ALCS
Los Angeles Angels; 2 (3 loss) streaks	41 years	1961 Enfranchised; No Postseason Series Wins until 2002	3	1979 ALCS; 1982 ALCS; 1986 ALCS	Orioles; Brewers; Red Sox	2002 ALDS
Los Angeles Angels; 2 (3 loss) streaks	3 years	2005 ALDS	3	2005 ALCS; 2007 ALDS; 2008 ALDS	White Sox; Red Sox; Red Sox	2009 ALDS
Los Angeles Dodgers	52 years	1903 First modern World Series; No Postseason Series Wins until 1955	7	1916 World Series; 1920 World Series; 1941 World Series; 1947 World Series; 1949 World Series; 1952 World Series; 1953 World Series	Red Sox; Indians; Yankees; Yankees; Yankees; Yankees; Yankees	1955 World Series
Miami Marlins ^	6 years	2020 NL Wild Card	2	2020 NLDS; 2023 NL Wild Card	Braves; Phillies	TBD
Milwaukee Brewers	6 years	2018 NLDS	6	2018 NLCS; 2019 NL Wild Card; 2020 NL Wild Card; 2021 NLDS; 2023 NL Wild Card; 2024 NL Wild Card	Dodgers; Nationals; Dodgers; Braves; Diamondbacks; Mets	2025 NLDS
Minnesota Twins	20 years	2002 ALDS	9	2002 ALCS; 2003 ALDS; 2004 ALDS; 2006 ALDS; 2009 ALDS; 2010 ALDS; 2017 AL Wild Card; 2019 ALDS; 2020 AL Wild Card	Angels; Yankees; Yankees; Athletics; Yankees; Yankees; Yankees; Yankees; Astros	2023 AL Wild Card
New York Mets	8 years	2015 NLCS	3	2015 World Series; 2016 NL Wild Card; 2022 NL Wild Card	Royals; Giants; Padres	2024 NL Wild Card
New York Yankees	4 years	2004 ALDS	4	2004 ALCS; 2005 ALDS; 2006 ALDS; 2007 ALDS	Red Sox; Angels; Tigers; Indians	2009 ALDS
Philadelphia Phillies	77 years	1903 First modern World Series; No Postseason Series Wins until 1980	5	1915 World Series; 1950 World Series; 1976 NLCS; 1977 NLCS; 1978 NLCS	Red Sox; Yankees; Reds; Dodgers; Dodgers	1980 NLCS
Pittsburgh Pirates ^ 3 (3 loss) streaks	7 years	1971 World Series	3	1972 NLCS; 1974 NLCS; 1975 NLCS	Reds; Dodgers; Reds	1979 NLCS
Pittsburgh Pirates ^ 3 (3 loss) streaks	33 years	1979 World Series	3	1990 NLCS; 1991 NLCS; 1992 NLCS	Reds; Braves; Braves	2013 NL Wild Card
Pittsburgh Pirates ^ 3 (3 loss) streaks	13 years	2013 NL Wild Card	3	2013 NLDS; 2014 NL Wild Card; 2015 NL Wild Card	Cardinals; Giants; Cubs	TBD
San Diego Padres	21 years	1998 NLCS	3	1998 World Series; 2005 NLDS; 2006 NLDS	Yankees; Cardinals; Cardinals	2020 NL Wild Card
San Francisco Giants	15 years	1905 World Series	4	1911 World Series; 1912 World Series; 1913 World Series; 1917 World Series	Athletics; Red Sox; Athletics; White Sox	1921 World Series
Seattle Mariners	4 years	1995 ALDS	2	1995 ALCS; 1997 ALDS	Indians; Orioles	2000 ALDS
St. Louis Cardinals ^	7 years	2019 NLDS	4	2019 NLCS; 2020 NL Wild Card; 2021 NL Wild Card; 2022 NL Wild Card	Nationals; Padres; Dodgers; Phillies	TBD
Tampa Bay Rays	6 years	2020 ALCS	4	2020 World Series; 2021 ALDS; 2022 AL Wild Card; 2023 AL Wild Card	Dodgers; Red Sox; Guardians; Rangers	2026 ALDS
Texas Rangers	11 years	2011 ALCS	4	2011 World Series; 2012 AL Wild Card; 2015 ALDS; 2016 ALDS	Cardinals; Orioles; Blue Jays; Blue Jays	2023 AL Wild Card
Toronto Blue Jays	8 years	2016 ALDS	4	2016 ALCS; 2020 AL Wild Card; 2022 AL Wild Card; 2023 AL Wild Card	Indians; Rays; Mariners; Twins	2025 ALDS
Washington Nationals	8 years	1981 NLDS	5	1981 NLCS; 2012 NLDS; 2014 NLDS; 2016 NLDS; 2017 NLDS	Dodgers; Cardinals; Giants; Dodgers; Cubs	2019 NL Wild Card
Team	Streak lasted	Last series win	Series lost	Postseason series losses	Opponent	Next series win

== See also ==
- List of Major League Baseball franchise postseason streaks
- List of Major League Baseball postseason series
- List of Major League Baseball postseason teams
- List of all-time Major League Baseball win–loss records
- List of NBA franchise post-season droughts
- List of NFL franchise post-season droughts
- List of NHL franchise post-season droughts
- List of MLS club post-season droughts
