= List of Milwaukee Brewers seasons =

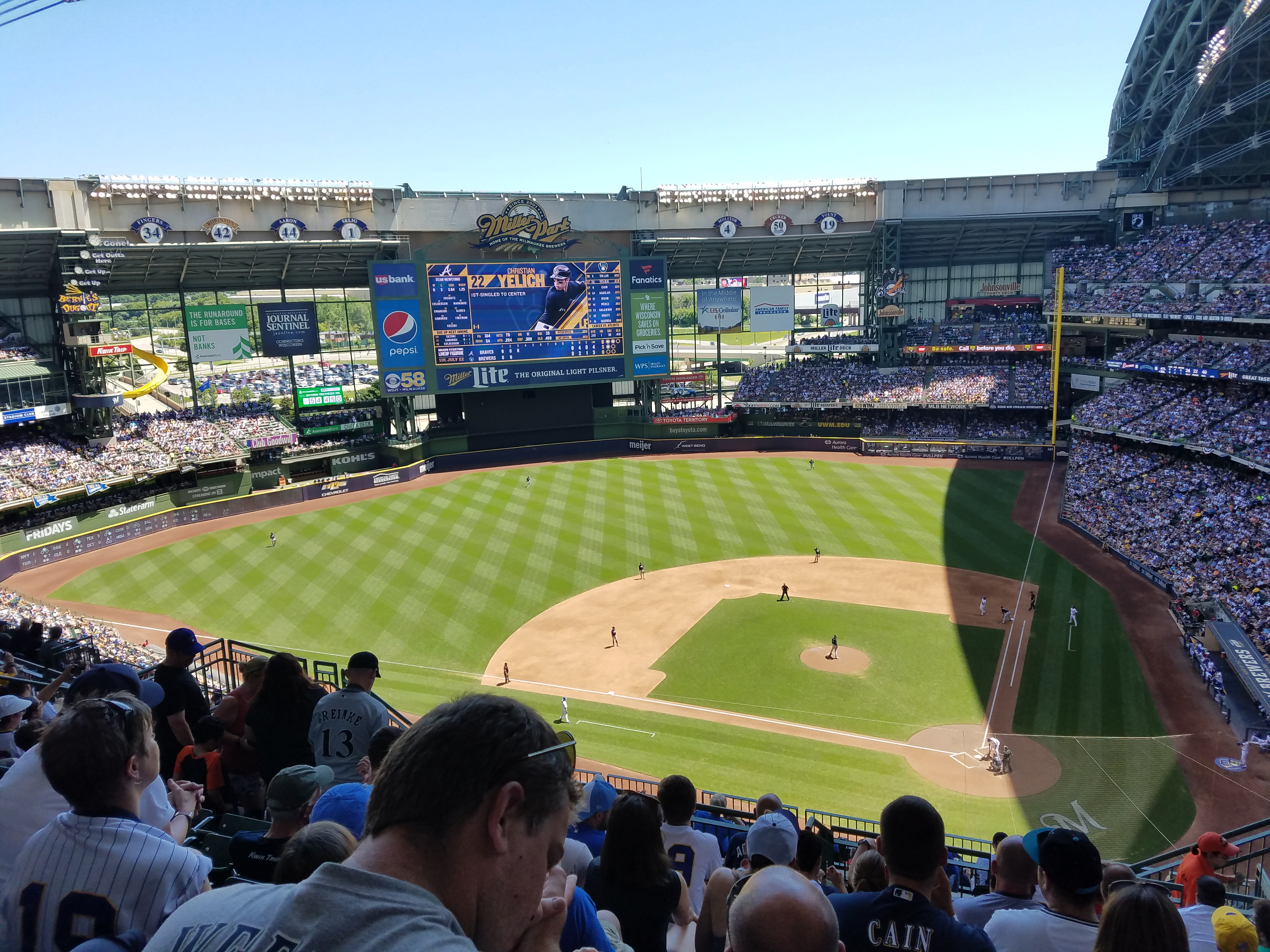
American Family Field, home of the Milwaukee Brewers since 2001

The Milwaukee Brewers Major League Baseball (MLB) franchise of the National League (NL) has played in Milwaukee, Wisconsin, since 1970. The team was established in 1969 as the Seattle Pilots in Seattle, Washington, and they became the Brewers after relocating to Wisconsin in 1970. The franchise played in the American League (AL) until 1998 when it moved to the National League in conjunction with a major league realignment. As of the completion of the 2025 season, the Brewers have played 9,000 regular-season games and compiled a win–loss record of 4,405–4,595 (.489). They have qualified for the postseason 11 times and have a postseason record of 25–38 (.397). Combining all 9,063 regular-season and postseason games, the team has an all-time record of 4,430–4,633 (.489).

The franchise posted losing records each of their first nine seasons. Their first winning season occurred in 1978 when they finished at 93–69 (.574). Three years later, the Brewers qualified for their first MLB postseason by winning the second half 1981 AL East Division title in a season which had been shortened by the 1981 Major League Baseball strike. They lost the American League Division Series to the New York Yankees, three games to two. The following year, Milwaukee won the AL East title and then the 1982 American League Championship Series versus the California Angels, three games to two. In that year's World Series, the Brewers faced the National League Champion St. Louis Cardinals. The series went to a decisive game seven and resulted in a Brewers World Series loss.

The team soon began a 25-year postseason drought that stood as the third-longest in the expanded-postseason era. Milwaukee returned to the playoffs in 2008 by winning the National League Wild Card. The Brewers lost the National League Division Series (NLDS) to the Philadelphia Phillies, three games to one. They won the 2011 NL Central Division title and defeated the Arizona Diamondbacks, three games to two, in the NLDS. Their postseason run was ended by the St. Louis Cardinals, who won the National League Championship Series (NLCS), four games to two.

In 2018, Milwaukee finished the regular-season tied with the Chicago Cubs for first place in the NL Central. The Brewers defeated the Cubs in a tie-breaker game, 3–1, securing the division title and relegating Chicago to the wild card game. Milwaukee then swept the Colorado Rockies in the best-of-five NLDS, advancing to the NLCS, where they lost to the Los Angeles Dodgers, four games to three. The following year, they secured one of two NL wild card berths but lost the 2019 National League Wild Card Game to the Washington Nationals, 4–3. The Brewers won another wild card spot in the 2020 season, which had been shortened due to the COVID-19 pandemic. They lost the 2020 NL Wild Card Series versus the Los Angeles Dodgers, two games to zero. Milwaukee won the 2021 NL Central Division title but lost the NLDS versus the Atlanta Braves, 3–1. In 2023, the Brewers again won the NL Central Division title, but lost in the NL Wild Card Series against the Arizona Diamondbacks. The 2024 division-champion Brewers were eliminated by the New York Mets, 2–1, in the NL Wild Card Series. The 2025 Brewers won the NL Central and defeated the Chicago Cubs in the NLDS, 3–2, but were defeated by the Los Angeles Dodgers in the NLCS, 4–0. The Brewers' best season record occurred in 2026 when they finished with an MLB-best record of 103–59 (.636).

In that same post-season they defeated the San Diego Padres, 3-1 in the NLDS, swept the Los Angeles Dodgers, 4-0 in the NLCS and were crowned World Champions after beating the Tampa Bay Rays 4-1.

Conversely, their lowest season record was 56–106 (.346) in 2002.

== Table key ==
MLB season	Each year is linked to an article about that particular MLB season.
Team season	Each year is linked to an article about that particular Brewers season.
Finish	The team's final position in the divisional standings
GB	Games behind the team that finished in first place in the division that season
Apps.	Postseason appearances: number of seasons the team qualified for the postseason
†	World Series champions (1969–present)
*	League champions (1969–present)
^	Division champions (1969–present)
¤	Wild card berth (1994–present)

== Season-by-season records ==
MLB season	Team season	League	Division	Regular-season					Postseason				Ref.
MLB season	Team season	League	Division	Finish	Wins	Losses	Win %	GB	Wins	Losses	Win %	Result	Ref.
1969	1969	AL	West	6th	64	98	.395	33	—	—	—	—	
1970	1970	AL	West	4th (tie)	65	97	.401	33	—	—	—	—	
1971	1971	AL	West	6th	69	92	.429	32	—	—	—	—	
1972	1972	AL	East	6th	65	91	.417	21	—	—	—	—	
1973	1973	AL	East	5th	74	88	.457	23	—	—	—	—	
1974	1974	AL	East	5th	76	86	.469	15	—	—	—	—	
1975	1975	AL	East	5th	68	94	.420	28	—	—	—	—	
1976	1976	AL	East	6th	66	95	.410	32	—	—	—	—	
1977	1977	AL	East	6th	67	95	.414	33	—	—	—	—	
1978	1978	AL	East	3rd	93	69	.574	6 1/2	—	—	—	—	
1979	1979	AL	East	2nd	95	66	.590	8	—	—	—	—	
1980	1980	AL	East	3rd	86	76	.531	17	—	—	—	—	
1981 (Note: The 1981 Major League Baseball strike resulted in a shortened season. Major League Baseball split the season into two halves with the division winner of each half playing in a divisional round of the playoffs.)	1981	AL	East	3rd	31	25	.554	3	2	3	.400	Lost ALDS vs. New York Yankees, 3–2	
1981	1981	AL	East	1st ^	31	22	.585	—	2	3	.400	Lost ALDS vs. New York Yankees, 3–2	
1982	1982	AL *	East ^	1st	95	67	.586	—	6	6	.500	Won ALCS vs. California Angels, 3–2 * Lost World Series vs. St. Louis Cardinals, 4–3	
1983	1983	AL	East	5th	87	75	.537	11	—	—	—	—	
1984	1984	AL	East	7th	67	94	.416	36 1/2	—	—	—	—	
1985	1985	AL	East	6th	71	90	.441	28	—	—	—	—	
1986	1986	AL	East	6th	77	84	.478	18	—	—	—	—	
1987	1987	AL	East	3rd	91	71	.562	7	—	—	—	—	
1988	1988	AL	East	3rd (tie)	87	75	.537	2	—	—	—	—	
1989	1989	AL	East	4th	81	81	.500	8	—	—	—	—	
1990	1990	AL	East	6th	74	88	.457	14	—	—	—	—	
1991	1991	AL	East	4th	83	79	.512	8	—	—	—	—	
1992	1992	AL	East	2nd	92	70	.568	4	—	—	—	—	
1993	1993	AL	East	7th	69	93	.426	26	—	—	—	—	
1994 (Note: The 1994–95 Major League Baseball strike ended the season on August 11 and resulted in the cancellation of the postseason.)	1994	AL	Central	5th	53	62	.461	15	—	—	—	—	
1995 (Note: The 1994–95 Major League Baseball strike caused the 1995 season to be shortened to 144 games.)	1995	AL	Central	4th	65	79	.451	35	—	—	—	—	
1996	1996	AL	Central	3rd	80	82	.494	19 1/2	—	—	—	—	
1997	1997	AL	Central	3rd	78	83	.484	8	—	—	—	—	
1998	1998	NL	Central	5th	74	88	.457	28	—	—	—	—	
1999	1999	NL	Central	5th	74	87	.460	22 1/2	—	—	—	—	
2000	2000	NL	Central	3rd	73	89	.451	22	—	—	—	—	
2001	2001	NL	Central	4th	68	94	.420	25	—	—	—	—	
2002	2002	NL	Central	6th	56	106	.346	41	—	—	—	—	
2003	2003	NL	Central	6th	68	94	.412	20	—	—	—	—	
2004	2004	NL	Central	6th	67	94	.416	37 1/2	—	—	—	—	
2005	2005	NL	Central	3rd	81	81	.500	19	—	—	—	—	
2006	2006	NL	Central	4th	75	87	.463	8 1/2	—	—	—	—	
2007	2007	NL	Central	2nd	83	79	.512	2	—	—	—	—	
2008	2008	NL	Central	2nd ¤	90	72	.556	7 1/2	1	3	.250	Lost NLDS vs. Philadelphia Phillies, 3–1	
2009	2009	NL	Central	3rd	80	82	.494	11	—	—	—	—	
2010	2010	NL	Central	3rd	77	85	.475	14	—	—	—	—	
2011	2011	NL	Central ^	1st	96	66	.593	—	5	6	.455	Won NLDS vs. Arizona Diamondbacks, 3–2; Lost NLCS vs. St. Louis Cardinals, 4–2	
2012	2012	NL	Central	3rd	83	79	.512	14	—	—	—	—	
2013	2013	NL	Central	4th	74	88	.457	23	—	—	—	—	
2014	2014	NL	Central	3rd	82	80	.506	8	—	—	—	—	
2015	2015	NL	Central	4th	68	94	.420	32	—	—	—	—	
2016	2016	NL	Central	4th	73	89	.451	30 1/2	—	—	—	—	
2017	2017	NL	Central	2nd	86	76	.531	6	—	—	—	—	
2018	2018	NL	Central ^ (Note: The Brewers finished the 2018 season tied for first with the Chicago Cubs, each with a 95–67 record. On October 1, the Brewers defeated the Cubs in a one-game playoff, 3–1, to win the NL Central Division title.)	1st	96	67	.589	—	6	4	.600	Won NLDS vs. Colorado Rockies, 3–0; Lost NLCS vs. Los Angeles Dodgers, 4–3	
2019	2019	NL	Central	2nd ¤	89	73	.549	2	0	1	.000	Lost NLWCG vs. Washington Nationals, 1–0	
2020 (Note: The COVID-19 pandemic caused the 2020 season to be shortened to 60 games.)	2020	NL	Central	4th ¤	29	31	.483	5	0	2	.000	Lost NLWCS vs. Los Angeles Dodgers, 2–0	
2021	2021	NL	Central ^	1st	95	67	.586	—	1	3	.250	Lost NLDS vs. Atlanta Braves, 3–1	
2022	2022	NL	Central	2nd	86	76	.531	7	—	—	—	—	
2023	2023	NL	Central ^	1st	92	70	.568	—	0	2	.000	Lost NLWCS vs. Arizona Diamondbacks, 2–0	
2024	2024	NL	Central ^	1st	93	69	.574	—	1	2	.333	Lost NLWCS vs. New York Mets, 2–1	
2025	2025	NL	Central ^	1st	97	65	.599	—	3	6	.333	Won NLDS vs. Chicago Cubs, 3–2; Lost NLCS vs. Los Angeles Dodgers, 4–0	
2026 †	2026	NL *	Central ^	1st	103	59	.636	—	11	2	.846	Won NLDS vs. San Diego Padres, 3–1; Won NLCS vs. Los Angeles Dodgers, 4–0; Won World Series vs. Tampa Bay Rays, 4–1 †	
Totals	—	—	—	—	4,508	4,654	.492	—	36	40	.474	—	—

== Postseason records ==
The Brewers have made the postseason 12 times in their history, with the first being in 1981 and the most recent being in 2026.

Season	Finish	Round	Opponent	Result	Wins	Losses
1981	AL East Champions (second half)	ALDS	New York Yankees	Lost	2	3
1982	AL Champions	ALCS	California Angels	Won	3	2
1982	AL Champions	World Series	St. Louis Cardinals	Lost	3	4
2008	NL Wild Card	NLDS	Philadelphia Phillies	Lost	1	3
2011	NL Central Champions	NLDS	Arizona Diamondbacks	Won	3	2
2011	NL Central Champions	NLCS	St. Louis Cardinals	Lost	2	4
2018	NL Central Champions	NLDS	Colorado Rockies	Won	3	0
2018	NL Central Champions	NLCS	Los Angeles Dodgers	Lost	3	4
2019	NL Wild Card	NL Wild Card Game	Washington Nationals	Lost	0	1
2020	NL Wild Card	NL Wild Card Series	Los Angeles Dodgers	Lost	0	2
2021	NL Central Champions	NLDS	Atlanta Braves	Lost	1	3
2023	NL Central Champions	NL Wild Card Series	Arizona Diamondbacks	Lost	0	2
2024	NL Central Champions	NL Wild Card Series	New York Mets	Lost	1	2
2025	NL Central Champions	NLDS	Chicago Cubs	Won	3	2
2025	NL Central Champions	NLCS	Los Angeles Dodgers	Lost	0	4
2026	World Series Champions	NLDS	San Diego Padres	Won	3	1
2026	World Series Champions	NLCS	Los Angeles Dodgers	Won	4	0
2026	World Series Champions	World Series	Tampa Bay Rays	Won	4	1
Totals	—			7–11	36	40

== Franchise totals ==
Franchise totals by decade
Decade	Regular-season			Postseason				Composite		
Decade	Wins	Losses	Win %	Apps.	Wins	Losses	Win %	Wins	Losses	Win %
1960s	64	98	.395	0	—	—	—	64	98	.395
1970s	738	873	.458	0	—	—	—	738	873	.458
1980s	804	760	.514	2	8	9	.471	812	769	.514
1990s	742	811	.478	0	—	—	—	742	811	.478
2000s	741	878	.458	1	1	3	.250	742	881	.457
2010s	824	797	.508	3	11	11	.500	835	808	.508
2020s	595	437	.577	6	16	17	.485	611	454	.574
All-time	4,508	4,654	.492	12	36	40	.474	4,544	4,694	.492

Franchise totals by league
League	Regular-season			Postseason				Composite		
League	Wins	Losses	Win %	Apps.	Wins	Losses	Win %	Wins	Losses	Win %
American League (1969–1997)	2,200	2,367	.482	2	8	9	.471	2,208	2,376	.482
National League (1998–present)	2,308	2,287	.502	10	28	31	.475	2,336	2,318	.502
All-time	4,508	4,654	.492	12	36	40	.474	4,544	4,694	.492
