= List of Chicago White Sox seasons =

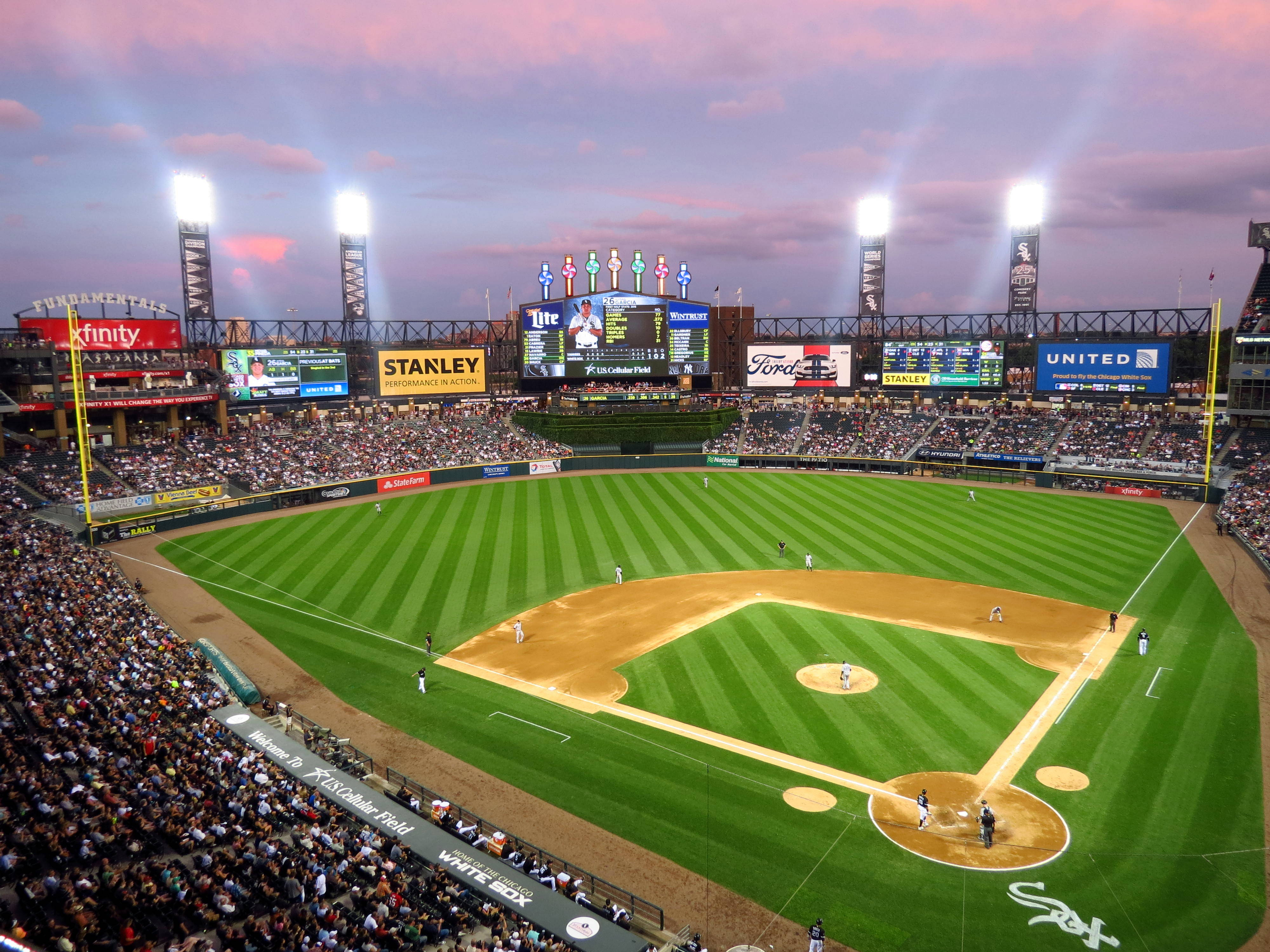
Rate Field, home field of the White Sox since the 1991 season.

This is a list of seasons completed by the Chicago White Sox, originally known as the Chicago White Stockings, professional baseball franchise. They have played in the American League from their inception in 1901.

The White Sox in total have completed 125 seasons in Major League Baseball, qualifying for the postseason eleven times and reaching the World Series five times (1906, 1917, 1919, 1959, 2005) with three world championships (1906, 1917, 2005). The White Sox began the first two decades of their inception with relative consistency among the eight teams in the League. In their first season, led by Calvin Griffith, they won the first American League pennant in 1901 with an 83-53-1 record. Pennant winners did not formally meet for the World Series until 1903, but the White Sox reached their first one in 1906 with a 93-58-3 record while managed by Fielder Jones. They won the cross-town series against the Chicago Cubs in six games. The team was relatively mediocre for the next couple of years before returning to form with the talents of players such as Eddie Cicotte and they won 100 games in 1917 for the first time in franchise history while roaring to the pennant. They won the Series in six games. An off year in 1918 set the stage for a riveting 1919 under rookie manager Kid Gleason that would develop into controversy. They won 88 games to win their second pennant in three years, but a number of disgruntled players would associate with gamblers before the Series in order to lose games for money. The White Sox lost five games to three and later saw the banishment of eight of their players (most notably Cicotte and Shoeless Joe Jackson) occur during the end of the 1920 season, which saw them miss the pennant by two games. They would not finish as close as two games out for the next three decades. By the middle of the 1950s, the White Sox were finally building talent to contend for a pennant, most notably with players such as Minnie Minoso, Nellie Fox and Billy Pierce. In 1955, they fell short by five games. Al Lopez was hired in 1957, and he would lead them to the pennant in 1959 with 94 victories. They faced the Los Angeles Dodgers in the Series and lost in six games. Although Lopez would never have a losing record in his tenure with the White Sox, they never did win another pennant with him as manager, with his final resignation occurring in 1969. For the next 35 years, the White Sox would go through periods of highs and lows that included two division titles under different managers (Tony La Russa in 1983 and Gene Lamont in 1993) while cultivating select stars from either the draft such as Frank Thomas and Harold Baines or trades for players like Carlton Fisk. However, it was not until 2005 that the White Sox put together a team that would compete fully for the AL pennant, with Ozzie Guillen leading the White Sox to 99 wins in the regular season on the heels of pitchers such as Mark Buehrle; that year, the White Sox won eleven of twelve postseason games to win their first world championship in 88 years. As of 2023, however, it also ranks as their last postseason series victory, and the 2005 run is the only time they have won a postseason series since 1917. The 2020 and 2021 seasons saw the White Sox reach the postseason both times, the first time in club history that they had made the postseason in consecutive seasons.

== Year by year ==
World Series Champions (1903–present) †	AL Champions (1901–present) *	Division Champions (1969–present) ^	Wild Card Berth (1994–present) ¤

Season	Level	League	Division	Finish	Won	Lost	Win%	GB	Postseason	Awards
Chicago White Stockings
1901	MLB	AL *		1st	83	53	.610	—		
1902	MLB	AL		4th	74	60	.552	8		
1903	MLB	AL		7th	60	77	.438	30.5		
Chicago White Sox
1904	MLB	AL		3rd	89	65	.578	6		
1905	MLB	AL		2nd	92	60	.605	2		
1906	MLB †	AL *		1st	93	58	.616	—	Won World Series (Cubs) 4–2 †	
1907	MLB	AL		3rd	87	64	.576	5.5		
1908	MLB	AL		3rd	88	64	.579	1.5		
1909	MLB	AL		4th	78	74	.513	20		
1910	MLB	AL		6th	68	85	.444	35.5		
1911	MLB	AL		5th	77	74	.510	24		
1912	MLB	AL		4th	78	76	.506	28		
1913	MLB	AL		5th	78	74	.513	17.5		
1914	MLB	AL		6th	70	84	.455	30		
1915	MLB	AL		3rd	93	61	.604	9.5		
1916	MLB	AL		2nd	89	65	.578	2		
1917	MLB †	AL *		1st	100	54	.649	—	Won World Series (Giants) 4–2 †	
1918	MLB	AL		6th	57	67	.460	17		
1919	MLB	AL *		1st	88	52	.629	—	Lost World Series (Reds) 5–3 *	
1920	MLB	AL		2nd	96	58	.623	2		
1921	MLB	AL		7th	62	92	.403	36.5		
1922	MLB	AL		5th	77	77	.500	17		
1923	MLB	AL		7th	69	85	.448	30		
1924	MLB	AL		8th	66	87	.431	25.5		
1925	MLB	AL		5th	66	87	.431	18.5		
1926	MLB	AL		5th	81	72	.529	9.5		
1927	MLB	AL		5th	70	83	.458	39.5		
1928	MLB	AL		5th	72	82	.468	29		
1929	MLB	AL		7th	59	93	.388	46		
1930	MLB	AL		7th	62	92	.403	40		
1931	MLB	AL		8th	56	97	.366	51.5		
1932	MLB	AL		7th	49	102	.325	56.5		
1933	MLB	AL		6th	67	83	.447	31		
1934	MLB	AL		8th	53	99	.349	47		
1935	MLB	AL		5th	74	78	.487	19.5		
1936	MLB	AL		4th	81	70	.536	20		
1937	MLB	AL		3rd	86	68	.558	16		
1938	MLB	AL		6th	65	83	.439	32		
1939	MLB	AL		4th	85	69	.552	22.5		
1940	MLB	AL		4th	82	72	.532	8		
1941	MLB	AL		3rd	77	77	.500	24		
1942	MLB	AL		6th	66	82	.446	34		
1943	MLB	AL		4th	82	72	.532	16		
1944	MLB	AL		7th	71	83	.461	18		
1945	MLB	AL		6th	71	78	.477	15		
1946	MLB	AL		5th	74	80	.481	30		
1947	MLB	AL		6th	70	84	.455	27		
1948	MLB	AL		8th	51	101	.336	44.5		
1949	MLB	AL		6th	63	91	.409	34		
1950	MLB	AL		6th	60	94	.390	38		
1951	MLB	AL		4th	81	73	.526	17		
1952	MLB	AL		3rd	81	73	.526	14		
1953	MLB	AL		3rd	89	65	.578	11.5		
1954	MLB	AL		3rd	94	60	.610	17		
1955	MLB	AL		3rd	91	63	.591	5		
1956	MLB	AL		3rd	85	69	.552	12		Luis Aparicio (ROY)
1957	MLB	AL		2nd	90	64	.584	8		
1958	MLB	AL		2nd	82	72	.532	10		
1959	MLB	AL *		1st	94	60	.610	—	Lost World Series (Dodgers) 4–2 *	Nellie Fox (MVP); Early Wynn (CYA)
1960	MLB	AL		3rd	87	67	.565	10		
1961	MLB	AL		4th	86	76	.531	23		
1962	MLB	AL		5th	85	77	.525	11		
1963	MLB	AL		2nd	94	68	.580	10.5		Gary Peters (ROY)
1964	MLB	AL		2nd	98	64	.605	1		
1965	MLB	AL		2nd	95	67	.586	7		
1966	MLB	AL		4th	83	79	.512	15		Tommie Agee (ROY)
1967	MLB	AL		4th	89	73	.549	3		
1968	MLB	AL		8th	67	95	.414	36		
1969	MLB	AL	West	5th	68	94	.420	29		
1970	MLB	AL	West	6th	56	106	.346	42		
1971	MLB	AL	West	3rd	79	83	.488	22.5		
1972	MLB	AL	West	2nd	87	67	.565	5.5		Dick Allen (MVP)
1973	MLB	AL	West	5th	77	85	.475	17		Jim Kaat (Gold Glove)
1974	MLB	AL	West	4th	80	80	.500	9		Jim Kaat (Gold Glove)
1975	MLB	AL	West	5th	75	86	.466	22.5		Jim Kaat (Gold Glove)
1976	MLB	AL	West	6th	64	97	.398	25.5		
1977	MLB	AL	West	3rd	90	72	.556	12		Jim Spencer (Gold Glove)
1978	MLB	AL	West	5th	71	90	.441	20.5		
1979	MLB	AL	West	5th	73	87	.456	14		
1980	MLB	AL	West	5th	70	90	.438	26		
1981	MLB	AL	West	3rd	31	22	.520	2½		Mike Squires (Gold Glove); Carlton Fisk (Silver Slugger Award)
1981	MLB	AL	West	6th	23	30	.491	7		Mike Squires (Gold Glove); Carlton Fisk (Silver Slugger Award)
1982	MLB	AL	West	3rd	87	75	.537	6		
1983	MLB	AL	West ^	1st	99	63	.611	—	Lost ALCS (Orioles) 3–1	LaMarr Hoyt (CYA); Ron Kittle (ROY); Tony La Russa (MOY)
1984	MLB	AL	West	5th	74	88	.457	10		
1985	MLB	AL	West	3rd	85	77	.525	6		Ozzie Guillén (ROY); Carlton Fisk (Silver Slugger Award)
1986	MLB	AL	West	5th	72	90	.444	20		
1987	MLB	AL	West	5th	77	85	.475	8		
1988	MLB	AL	West	5th	71	90	.441	32.5		Carlton Fisk (Silver Slugger Award)
1989	MLB	AL	West	7th	69	92	.429	29.5		Harold Baines (Silver Slugger Award)
1990	MLB	AL	West	2nd	94	68	.580	9		Jeff Torborg (MOY); Ozzie Guillén (Gold Glove)
1991	MLB	AL	West	2nd	87	75	.537	8		Robin Ventura (Gold Glove)
1992	MLB	AL	West	3rd	86	76	.531	10		Robin Ventura (Gold Glove)
1993	MLB	AL	West ^	1st	94	68	.580	—	Lost ALCS (Blue Jays) 4–2	Frank Thomas (MVP); Jack McDowell (CYA); Gene Lamont (MOY); Robin Ventura (Gold Glove); Frank Thomas (Silver Slugger Award)
1994	MLB	AL	Central	1st	67	46	.593	—	Playoffs cancelled	Frank Thomas (MVP); Frank Thomas (Silver Slugger Award); Julio Franco (Silver Slugger Award)
1995	MLB	AL	Central	3rd	68	76	.472	32		
1996	MLB	AL	Central	2nd	85	77	.525	14.5		Robin Ventura (Gold Glove)
1997	MLB	AL	Central	2nd	80	81	.497	6		
1998	MLB	AL	Central	2nd	80	82	.494	9		Robin Ventura (Gold Glove); Albert Belle (Silver Slugger Award)
1999	MLB	AL	Central	2nd	75	86	.466	21.5		
2000	MLB	AL	Central ^	1st	95	67	.586	—	Lost ALDS (Mariners) 3–0	Jerry Manuel (MOY); Frank Thomas (Silver Slugger Award); Magglio Ordóñez (Silver Slugger Award)
2001	MLB	AL	Central	3rd	83	79	.512	8		
2002	MLB	AL	Central	2nd	81	81	.500	13.5		Magglio Ordóñez (Silver Slugger Award)
2003	MLB	AL	Central	2nd	86	76	.531	4		
2004	MLB	AL	Central	2nd	83	79	.512	9		
2005	MLB †	AL *	Central ^	1st	99	63	.611	—	Won ALDS (Red Sox) 3–0; Won ALCS (Angels) 4–1; Won World Series (Astros) 4–0 †	Ozzie Guillén (MOY)
2006	MLB	AL	Central	3rd	90	72	.556	6		Joe Crede (Silver Slugger Award); Jermaine Dye (Silver Slugger Award); Jim Thome (CPOY)
2007	MLB	AL	Central	4th	72	90	.444	24		
2008	MLB	AL	Central ^	1st	89	74	.546	—	Lost ALDS (Rays) 3–1	Carlos Quentin (Silver Slugger Award)
2009	MLB	AL	Central	3rd	79	83	.488	7.5		Mark Buehrle (Gold Glove)
2010	MLB	AL	Central	2nd	88	74	.543	6		Mark Buehrle (Gold Glove); Alexei Ramírez (Silver Slugger Award)
2011	MLB	AL	Central	3rd	79	83	.488	16		Mark Buehrle (Gold Glove)
2012	MLB	AL	Central	2nd	85	77	.525	3		Jake Peavy (Gold Glove)
2013	MLB	AL	Central	5th	63	99	.389	30		
2014	MLB	AL	Central	4th	73	89	.451	17		José Abreu (ROY); José Abreu (Silver Slugger Award); Alexei Ramírez (Silver Slugger Award)
2015	MLB	AL	Central	4th	76	86	.469	19		
2016	MLB	AL	Central	4th	78	84	.481	16.5		
2017	MLB	AL	Central	4th	67	95	.414	35		
2018	MLB	AL	Central	4th	62	100	.383	29		José Abreu (Silver Slugger Award)
2019	MLB	AL	Central	3rd	72	89	.447	28.5		Yolmer Sánchez (Gold Glove)
2020	MLB	AL	Central	3rd ¤	35	25	.583	1	Lost ALWC (Athletics) 2–1	José Abreu (MVP); José Abreu (All-MLB 2nd Team); Eloy Jiménez (Silver Slugger Award); Tim Anderson (Silver Slugger Award); Luis Robert (Gold Glove)
2021	MLB	AL	Central ^	1st	93	69	.574	—	Lost ALDS (Astros) 3–1	Liam Hendriks (RPOY); Liam Hendriks (All-MLB 1st Team); Dallas Keuchel (Gold Glove)
2022	MLB	AL	Central	2nd	81	81	.500	11		Dylan Cease (All-MLB 2nd Team)
2023	MLB	AL	Central	4th	61	101	.377	26		Luis Robert (Silver Slugger)
2024	MLB	AL	Central	5th	41	121	.253	51.5		
2025	MLB	AL	Central	5th	60	102	.370	28		
2026	MLB	AL	Central	2nd ¤	84	78	.519	1	Won ALWC (Astros) 2–0; Lost ALDS (Guardians) 3–2	
Totals					Wins	Losses	Win%			
Totals					9,738	9,792	.499	All-time regular season record (1901–2026)		
Totals					34	35	.493	All-time postseason record		
Totals					9,772	9,827	.499	All-time regular and postseason record		

== Record by decade ==
The following table describes the White Sox's MLB win–loss record by decade.

Decade	Wins	Losses	Pct
1900s	744	575	.564
1910s	798	692	.536
1920s	731	804	.476
1930s	678	841	.446
1940s	707	820	.463
1950s	847	693	.550
1960s	852	760	.529
1970s	752	853	.469
1980s	758	802	.486
1990s	816	735	.526
2000s	857	764	.529
2010s	743	876	.459
2020s	371	499	.426
All-time	9,654	9,714	.498

These statistics are from Baseball-Reference.com's Chicago White Sox History & Encyclopedia, except where noted, and are current as of October 2025.

== Post-season record by year ==
The White Sox have made the postseason twelve times in their history, with their first being in 1906 and the most recent being in 2026.

Year	Finish	Round	Opponent	Result		
1906	World Series Champions	World Series	Chicago Cubs	Won	4	2
1917	World Series Champions	World Series	New York Giants	Won	4	2
1919	American League Champions	World Series	Cincinnati Reds	Lost	3	5
1959	American League Champions	World Series	Los Angeles Dodgers	Lost	2	4
1983	American League West Champions	ALCS	Baltimore Orioles	Lost	1	3
1993	American League West Champions	ALCS	Toronto Blue Jays	Lost	2	4
2000	American League Central Champions	ALDS	Seattle Mariners	Lost	0	3
2005	World Series Champions	ALDS	Boston Red Sox	Won	3	0
2005	World Series Champions	ALCS	Anaheim Angels	Won	4	1
2005	World Series Champions	World Series	Houston Astros	Won	4	0
2008	American League Central Champions	ALDS	Tampa Bay Rays	Lost	1	3
2020	American League Wild Card	ALWCS	Oakland Athletics	Lost	1	2
2021	American League Central Champions	ALDS	Houston Astros	Lost	1	3
2026	American League Wild Card	ALWC	Houston Astros	Won	2	0
2026	American League Wild Card	ALDS	Cleveland Guardians	Lost	2	3
12	Totals			6–9	34	35
