= List of Toronto Blue Jays seasons =

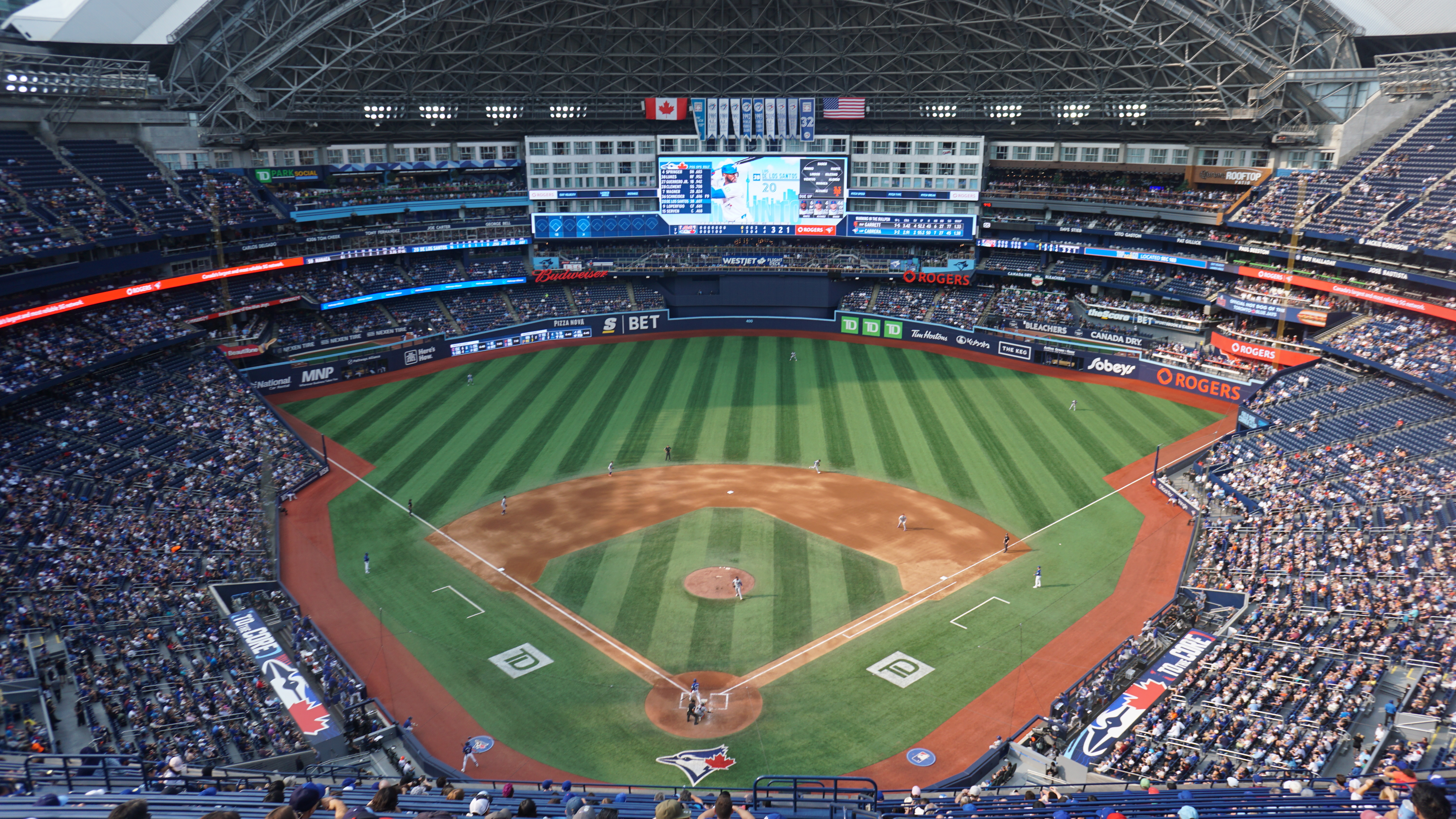
The Rogers Centre, home field of the Blue Jays since June 1989

The Toronto Blue Jays are a professional baseball team based in Toronto, Ontario and a member of Major League Baseball's (MLB) American League East Division. Since June 5, 1989, the Blue Jays have played in the Rogers Centre (called the "SkyDome" until February 2, 2005). Before that, they played at Exhibition Stadium. They played their 2020 season at Sahlen Field in Buffalo, New York due to the COVID-19 pandemic. The name "Blue Jays" was chosen via a contest in 1976 from among more than 4,000 suggestions.

The Blue Jays made their MLB debut during the 1977 baseball season, as an expansion team. They first made the playoffs in 1985, by capturing the American League East Division, but lost the American League Championship Series (ALCS) in seven games to the Kansas City Royals. The team returned to the playoffs in 1989, where they lost to the Oakland Athletics in the ALCS in five games, and again in 1991, where once more the Blue Jays were defeated in the ALCS in five games, this time by the Minnesota Twins.

In 1992, the Blue Jays became the first Canadian-based team to win the Commissioner's Trophy, with a pair of six-game victories over Oakland in the ALCS and the Atlanta Braves in the World Series. In 1993, they repeated their success, with another pair of six-game victories over the Chicago White Sox in the ALCS and the Philadelphia Phillies in the World Series. After 1993, the Blue Jays failed to qualify for the playoffs for 21 consecutive seasons, until clinching a playoff berth in 2015.

Through 50 seasons of baseball, the Blue Jays have recorded 28 seasons at .500 or better, 27 of which have been winning campaigns, and have qualified for the playoffs 11 times while winning three American League pennants and two World Series.

== Table key ==
ALWCG	American League Wild Card Game
ALWCS	American League Wild Card Series
ALDS	American League Division Series
ALCS	American League Championship Series
MVP	Most Valuable Player Award
CYA	Cy Young Award
ROY	Rookie of the Year Award
MOY	Manager of the Year Award
CB POY	Comeback Player of the Year Award
WS MVP	World Series Most Valuable Player Award

== Year by year results ==
World Series champions †	American League champions *	Division champions ^	Wild card berth ¤

Season	Level	League	Division	Finish	Wins	Losses	Win%	GB	Postseason	Awards
1977	1977	AL	East	7th	54	107	.335	45.5		
1978	1978	AL	East	7th	59	102	.366	40		
1979	1979	AL	East	7th	53	109	.327	50.5		Alfredo Griffin (Co-ROY)^{[a]}
1980	1980	AL	East	7th	67	95	.414	36		
1981^{[b]}	1981	AL	East	7th	16	42	.276	18		
1981^{[b]}	1981	AL	East	7th	21	27	.438	10		
1982	1982	AL	East	6th	78	84	.481	17		
1983	1983	AL	East	4th	89	73	.549	9		
1984	1984	AL	East	2nd	89	73	.549	15		
1985^{[c]}	1985	AL	East ^	1st ^	99	62	.615	—	Lost ALCS (Royals) 4–3	Bobby Cox (MOY)
1986	1986	AL	East	4th	86	76	.531	9.5		
1987	1987	AL	East	2nd	96	66	.593	2		George Bell (MVP)
1988	1988	AL	East	3rd	87	75	.537	2		
1989	1989	AL	East ^	1st ^	89	73	.549	—	Lost ALCS (Athletics) 4–1	
1990	1990	AL	East	2nd	86	76	.531	2		
1991	1991	AL	East ^	1st ^	91	71	.562	—	Lost ALCS (Twins) 4–1	
1992 †	1992	AL *	East ^	1st ^	96	66	.593	—	Won ALCS (Athletics) 4–2; Won World Series (Braves) 4–2 †	
1993 †	1993	AL *	East ^	1st ^	95	67	.586	—	Won ALCS (White Sox) 4–2; Won World Series (Phillies) 4–2 †	
1994^{[d]}	1994	AL	East	3rd	55	60	.478	16	Playoffs cancelled^{[d]}	
1995^{[e]}	1995	AL	East	5th	56	88	.389	30		
1996	1996	AL	East	4th	74	88	.457	18		Pat Hentgen (CYA)
1997	1997	AL	East	5th	76	86	.469	22		Roger Clemens (CYA)
1998	1998	AL	East	3rd	88	74	.543	26		Roger Clemens (CYA)
1999	1999	AL	East	3rd	84	78	.519	14		
2000	2000	AL	East	3rd	83	79	.512	4.5		
2001	2001	AL	East	3rd	80	82	.494	16		
2002	2002	AL	East	3rd	78	84	.481	25.5		Eric Hinske (ROY)
2003	2003	AL	East	3rd	86	76	.531	15		Roy Halladay (CYA)
2004	2004	AL	East	5th	67	94	.416	33.5		
2005	2005	AL	East	3rd	80	82	.494	15		
2006	2006	AL	East	2nd	87	75	.537	10		
2007	2007	AL	East	3rd	83	79	.512	13		
2008	2008	AL	East	4th	86	76	.531	11		
2009	2009	AL	East	4th	75	87	.463	28		Aaron Hill (CPOY)
2010	2010	AL	East	4th	85	77	.525	11		
2011	2011	AL	East	4th	81	81	.500	16		
2012	2012	AL	East	4th	73	89	.451	22		
2013	2013	AL	East	5th	74	88	.457	23		
2014	2014	AL	East	3rd	83	79	.512	13		
2015	2015	AL	East ^	1st ^	93	69	.574	—	Won ALDS (Rangers) 3–2; Lost ALCS (Royals) 4–2	Josh Donaldson (MVP)
2016	2016	AL	East	2nd ¤	89	73	.549	4	Won ALWCG (Orioles); Won ALDS (Rangers) 3–0; Lost ALCS (Indians) 4–1	
2017	2017	AL	East	4th	76	86	.469	17		
2018	2018	AL	East	4th	73	89	.451	35		
2019	2019	AL	East	4th	67	95	.414	36		
2020^{[f]}	2020	AL	East	3rd ¤	32	28	.533	8	Lost ALWCS (Rays) 2–0	
2021	2021	AL	East	4th	91	71	.562	9		Robbie Ray (CYA)
2022	2022	AL	East	2nd ¤	92	70	.568	7	Lost ALWCS (Mariners) 2–0	
2023	2023	AL	East	3rd ¤	89	73	.549	12	Lost ALWCS (Twins) 2–0	
2024	2024	AL	East	5th	74	88	.457	20		
2025	2025	AL *	East ^	1st ^	94	68	.580	—	Won ALDS (Yankees) 3–1; Won ALCS (Mariners) 4–3; Lost World Series (Dodgers) 4–3 *	
2026	2026	AL	East	5th	79	83	.488	19		
Totals					Wins	Losses	Win%			
Totals					3,934	3,939	.500	All-time regular season record (1977–2026)		
Totals					41	44	.482	All-time postseason record (1977–2026)		
Totals					3,975	3,983	.499	All-time regular and postseason record (1977–2026)		

== Record by decade ==
The following table describes the Blue Jays' MLB win–loss record by decade.

Decade	Games	Wins	Losses	Pct
1970s	484	166	318	.343
1980s	1,563	817	746	.523
1990s	1,555	801	754	.515
2000s	1,619	805	814	.497
2010s	1,620	794	826	.490
2020s	1,032	551	481	.534
All-time	7,873	3,934	3,939	.500

These statistics are from Baseball-Reference.com's Toronto Blue Jays History & Encyclopedia, and are current as of 2026.

== Postseason record by year ==
The Blue Jays have made the postseason 11 times in their history, with their first being in 1985 and the most recent being in 2025.

Year	Result	Round	Opponent	Result		
1985	AL East Champions	ALCS	Kansas City Royals	Lost	3	4
1989	AL East Champions	ALCS	Oakland Athletics	Lost	1	4
1991	AL East Champions	ALCS	Minnesota Twins	Lost	1	4
1992	World Series Champions	ALCS	Oakland Athletics	Won	4	2
1992	World Series Champions	World Series	Atlanta Braves	Won	4	2
1993	World Series Champions	ALCS	Chicago White Sox	Won	4	2
1993	World Series Champions	World Series	Philadelphia Phillies	Won	4	2
2015	AL East Champions	ALDS	Texas Rangers	Won	3	2
2015	AL East Champions	ALCS	Kansas City Royals	Lost	2	4
2016	AL Wild Card	ALWCG	Baltimore Orioles	Won	1	0
2016	AL Wild Card	ALDS	Texas Rangers	Won	3	0
2016	AL Wild Card	ALCS	Cleveland Indians	Lost	1	4
2020	AL Wild Card	ALWCS	Tampa Bay Rays	Lost	0	2
2022	AL Wild Card	ALWCS	Seattle Mariners	Lost	0	2
2023	AL Wild Card	ALWCS	Minnesota Twins	Lost	0	2
2025	AL Champions	ALDS	New York Yankees	Won	3	1
2025	AL Champions	ALCS	Seattle Mariners	Won	4	3
2025	AL Champions	World Series	Los Angeles Dodgers	Lost	3	4
11	Totals			9–9	41	44

The Toronto Blue Jays were eliminated by the eventual World Series champions five times:

- 1985, by the Kansas City Royals
- 1989, by the Oakland Athletics
- 1991, by the Minnesota Twins
- 2015, by the Kansas City Royals
- 2025, by the Los Angeles Dodgers

== Notes ==
- ^{a} Voting for the 1979 American League Rookie of the Year Award ended in a tie. Griffin shared the award with John Castino of the Minnesota Twins.
- ^{b} The 1981 Major League Baseball strike resulted in the regular season being shorted. The season was split into two halves, with the division winner of each half playing in a divisional round of the playoffs.
- ^{c} The 1985 Major League Baseball strike resulted in one regular season game being cancelled and not rescheduled.
- ^{d} The 1994–95 Major League Baseball strike resulted in the regular season ending on August 11, and the entire postseason being cancelled.
- ^{e} The 1994–95 Major League Baseball strike resulted in the shortening of the 1995 season to 144 games.
- ^{f} The global COVID-19 pandemic resulted in the start of the 2020 regular season being delayed, and only 60 games played.
