= List of San Diego Padres seasons =

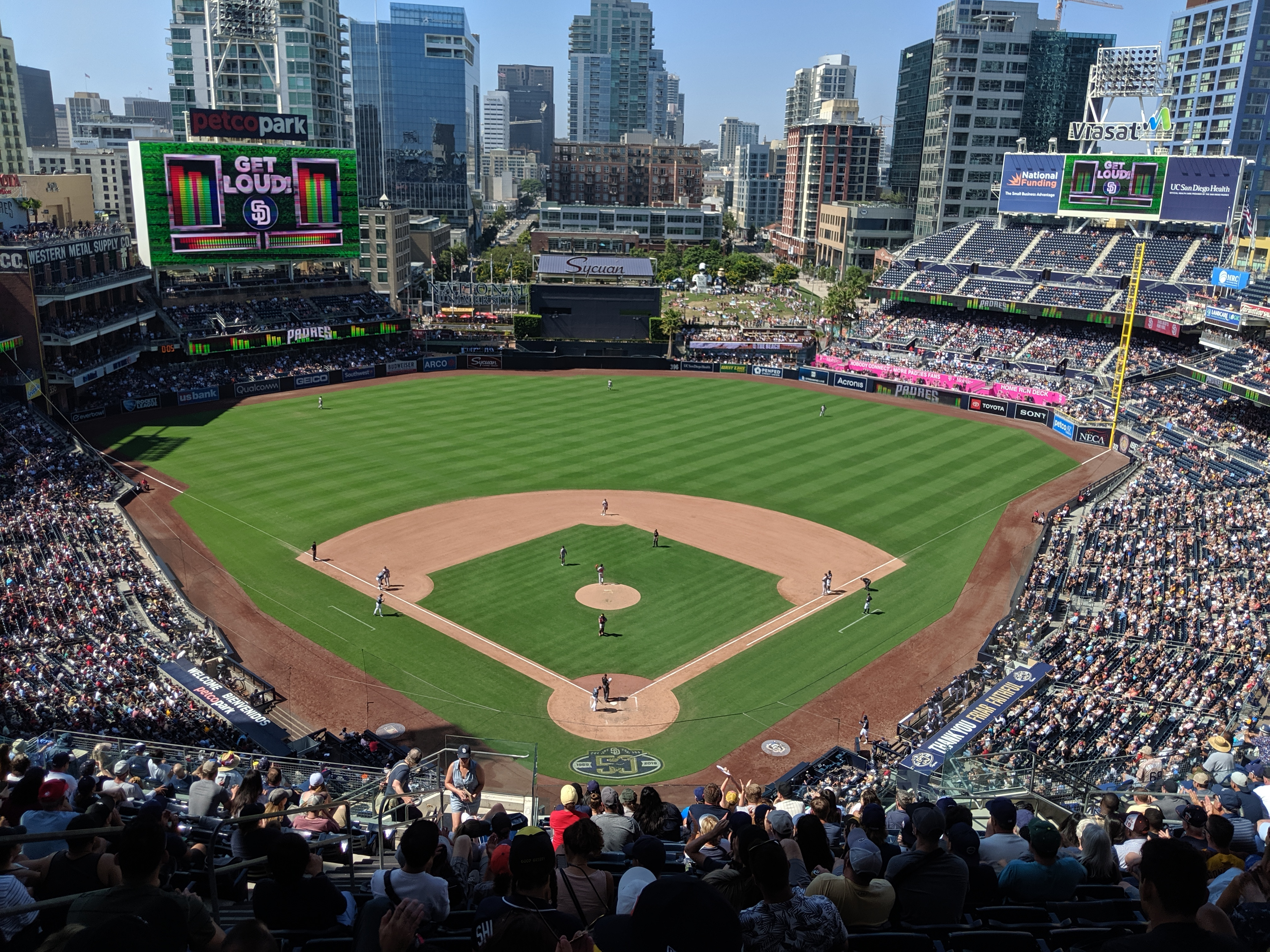
Petco Park, home field of the Padres since the 2004 season.

The San Diego Padres are an American professional baseball team based in San Diego. The Padres compete in Major League Baseball (MLB) as a member club of the National League (NL) West Division.

The team has won two NL pennants, in 1984 and 1998, losing in the World Series both years. Under manager Dick Williams, the Padres clinched their first NL pennant, losing to the Detroit Tigers in the 1984 World Series. The Padres achieved their second NL pennant alongside Trevor Hoffman, eventually being swept by the New York Yankees in the 1998 World Series.

The Padres are the oldest team that has never won the World Series. As of 2026, the Padres have had 20 winning seasons in franchise history. Among the eight expansion teams of the 1960s, the Padres were the last to reach the postseason. Despite reaching the postseason seven times since 2005, the team has yet to return to the World Series.

== Regular season record-by-year ==
NL champions *	Division champions ^	Wild card berth (1995–present) ¤

Since 1969, the Padres have had eighteen seasons in which they have finished with a win percentage of .500 or better. During only seven of those years, the team has made playoff appearances, including during the shortened 2020 season due to the ongoing COVID-19 pandemic.

Season	Level	League	Division	Finish	Wins	Losses	Win%	GB	Postseason	Awards
1969	MLB	NL	West	6th	52	110	.321	41		
1970	MLB	NL	West	6th	63	99	.389	39		
1971	MLB	NL	West	6th	61	100	.379	28½		
1972	MLB	NL	West	6th	58	95	.379	36½		
1973	MLB	NL	West	6th	60	102	.370	39		
1974	MLB	NL	West	6th	60	102	.370	42		
1975	MLB	NL	West	4th	71	91	.438	37		
1976	MLB	NL	West	5th	73	89	.451	29		Randy Jones (CYA); Butch Metzger (ROY)
1977	MLB	NL	West	5th	69	93	.426	29		
1978	MLB	NL	West	4th	84	78	.519	11		Gaylord Perry (CYA)
1979	MLB	NL	West	5th	68	93	.422	22		
1980	MLB	NL	West	6th	73	89	.451	19½		
1981	MLB	NL	West	6th	23	33	.411	12½		
1981	MLB	NL	West	6th	18	36	.333	15½		
1982	MLB	NL	West	4th	81	81	.500	8		
1983	MLB	NL	West	4th	81	81	.500	10		
1984	MLB	NL *	West ^	1st	92	70	.568	—	Won NLCS (Cubs) 3–2; Lost World Series (Tigers) 4–1 *	
1985	MLB	NL	West	3rd	83	79	.512	12		
1986	MLB	NL	West	4th	74	88	.457	22		
1987	MLB	NL	West	6th	65	97	.401	25		Benito Santiago (ROY)
1988	MLB	NL	West	3rd	83	78	.516	11		
1989	MLB	NL	West	2nd	89	73	.549	3		Mark Davis (CYA)
1990	MLB	NL	West	4th	75	87	.463	16		
1991	MLB	NL	West	3rd	84	78	.519	10		
1992	MLB	NL	West	3rd	82	80	.506	16		
1993	MLB	NL	West	6th	61	101	.377	43		
1994	MLB	NL	West	4th	47	70	.402	12½	Playoffs cancelled	
1995	MLB	NL	West	3rd	70	74	.486	8		
1996	MLB	NL	West ^	1st	91	71	.562	—	Lost NLDS (Cardinals) 3–0	Ken Caminiti (MVP); Bruce Bochy (MOY)
1997	MLB	NL	West	4th	76	86	.469	14		
1998	MLB	NL *	West ^	1st	98	64	.605	—	Won NLDS (Astros) 3–1; Won NLCS (Braves) 4–2; Lost World Series (Yankees) 4–0 *	
1999	MLB	NL	West	4th	74	88	.457	26		
2000	MLB	NL	West	5th	76	86	.469	21		
2001	MLB	NL	West	4th	79	83	.488	13		
2002	MLB	NL	West	5th	66	96	.407	32		
2003	MLB	NL	West	5th	64	98	.395	36½		
2004	MLB	NL	West	3rd	87	75	.537	6		
2005	MLB	NL	West ^	1st	82	80	.506	—	Lost NLDS (Cardinals) 3–0	
2006	MLB	NL	West ^	1st	88	74	.543	—	Lost NLDS (Cardinals) 3–1	
2007	MLB	NL	West	3rd ^{[A]}	89	74	.546	1½		Jake Peavy (CYA)
2008	MLB	NL	West	5th	63	99	.389	21		
2009	MLB	NL	West	4th	75	87	.463	20		
2010	MLB	NL	West	2nd	90	72	.555	2		Bud Black (MOY)
2011	MLB	NL	West	5th	71	91	.435	23		
2012	MLB	NL	West	4th	76	86	.469	18		
2013	MLB	NL	West	T-3rd	76	86	.469	16		
2014	MLB	NL	West	3rd	77	85	.475	17		
2015	MLB	NL	West	4th	74	88	.457	18		
2016	MLB	NL	West	5th	68	94	.420	23		
2017	MLB	NL	West	4th	71	91	.438	33		
2018	MLB	NL	West	5th	66	96	.407	26		
2019	MLB	NL	West	5th	70	92	.432	36		
2020	MLB	NL	West	2nd ¤	37	23	.617	6	Won NLWC (Cardinals) 2–1; Lost NLDS (Dodgers) 3–0	
2021	MLB	NL	West	3rd	79	83	.488	28		
2022	MLB	NL	West	2nd ¤	89	73	.549	22	Won NLWC (Mets) 2–1; Won NLDS (Dodgers) 3–1; Lost NLCS (Phillies) 4–1	
2023	MLB	NL	West	3rd	82	80	.506	18		Blake Snell (CYA)
2024	MLB	NL	West	2nd ¤	93	69	.574	5	Won NLWC (Braves) 2–0; Lost NLDS (Dodgers) 3–2	
2025	MLB	NL	West	2nd ¤	90	72	.555	3	Lost NLWC (Cubs) 2–1	
2026	MLB	NL	West	2nd ¤	91	71	.562	9	Won NLWC (Cubs) 2–0; Lost NLDS (Brewers) 3–1	Mason Miller (RPOY)
Totals					Wins	Losses	Win%			
Totals					4,308	4,860	.470	All-time regular season record (1969–2026)		
Totals					28	40	.412	All-time postseason record		
Totals					4,336	4,900	.464	All-time regular and postseason record		

^{A} The Padres finished tied with the Colorado Rockies for the wild card spot. Colorado defeated San Diego 9–8, in a one-game playoff to clinch the wild card spot.

== Record by decade ==
The following table describes the Padres' MLB win–loss record by decade.

Decade	Wins	Losses	Pct
1960s	52	110	.321
1970s	667	942	.415
1980s	762	805	.486
1990s	758	799	.487
2000s	769	852	.474
2010s	739	881	.456
2020s	561	471	.544
All-time	4308	4860	.470

These statistics are from Baseball Reference's San Diego Padres History & Encyclopedia, and are current as of October 2, 2026.

== Postseason history ==
Year	Wild Card ^{[A]}		NLDS ^{[B]}		NLCS		World Series	
1984	None (Won NL West)				Chicago Cubs	W (3–2)	Detroit Tigers	L (1–4)
1996	None (Won NL West)		St. Louis Cardinals	L (0–3)				
1998	None (Won NL West)		Houston Astros	W (3–1)	Atlanta Braves	W (4–2)	New York Yankees	L (0–4)
2005	None (Won NL West)		St. Louis Cardinals	L (0–3)				
2006	None (Won NL West)		St. Louis Cardinals	L (1–3)				
2020	St. Louis Cardinals	W (2–1)	Los Angeles Dodgers	L (0–3)				
2022	New York Mets	W (2–1)	Los Angeles Dodgers	W (3–1)	Philadelphia Phillies	L (1–4)		
2024	Atlanta Braves	W (2–0)	Los Angeles Dodgers	L (2–3)				
2025	Chicago Cubs	L (1–2)						
2026	Chicago Cubs	W (2–0)	Milwaukee Brewers	L (1–3)				

1. ^{↑}The wild-card round was first played in 2012 and expanded for the 2020 season.
2. ^{↑}The National League Division Series was first played in 1981 and added permanently in 1995.

== Postseason record by year ==
The Padres have made the postseason ten times in their history, with their first being in 1984 and the most recent being in 2026.

Year	Finish	Round	Opponent	Result		
1984	National League Champions	NLCS	Chicago Cubs	Won	3	2
1984	National League Champions	World Series	Detroit Tigers	Lost	1	4
1996	NL West Champions	NLDS	St. Louis Cardinals	Lost	0	3
1998	National League Champions	NLDS	Houston Astros	Won	3	1
1998	National League Champions	NLCS	Atlanta Braves	Won	4	2
1998	National League Champions	World Series	New York Yankees	Lost	0	4
2005	NL West Champions	NLDS	St. Louis Cardinals	Lost	0	3
2006	NL West Champions	NLDS	St. Louis Cardinals	Lost	1	3
2020	NL Wild Card Champions	NLWCS	St. Louis Cardinals	Won	2	1
2020	NL Wild Card Champions	NLDS	Los Angeles Dodgers	Lost	0	3
2022	NL Division Series Champions	NLWCS	New York Mets	Won	2	1
2022	NL Division Series Champions	NLDS	Los Angeles Dodgers	Won	3	1
2022	NL Division Series Champions	NLCS	Philadelphia Phillies	Lost	1	4
2024	NL Wild Card Champions	NLWCS	Atlanta Braves	Won	2	0
2024	NL Wild Card Champions	NLDS	Los Angeles Dodgers	Lost	2	3
2025	NL Wild Card	NLWCS	Chicago Cubs	Lost	1	2
2026	NL Wild Card Champions	NLWCS	Chicago Cubs	Won	2	0
2026	NL Wild Card Champions	NLDS	Milwaukee Brewers	Lost	1	3
10	Totals			8–10	28	40
