= List of Miami Marlins seasons =

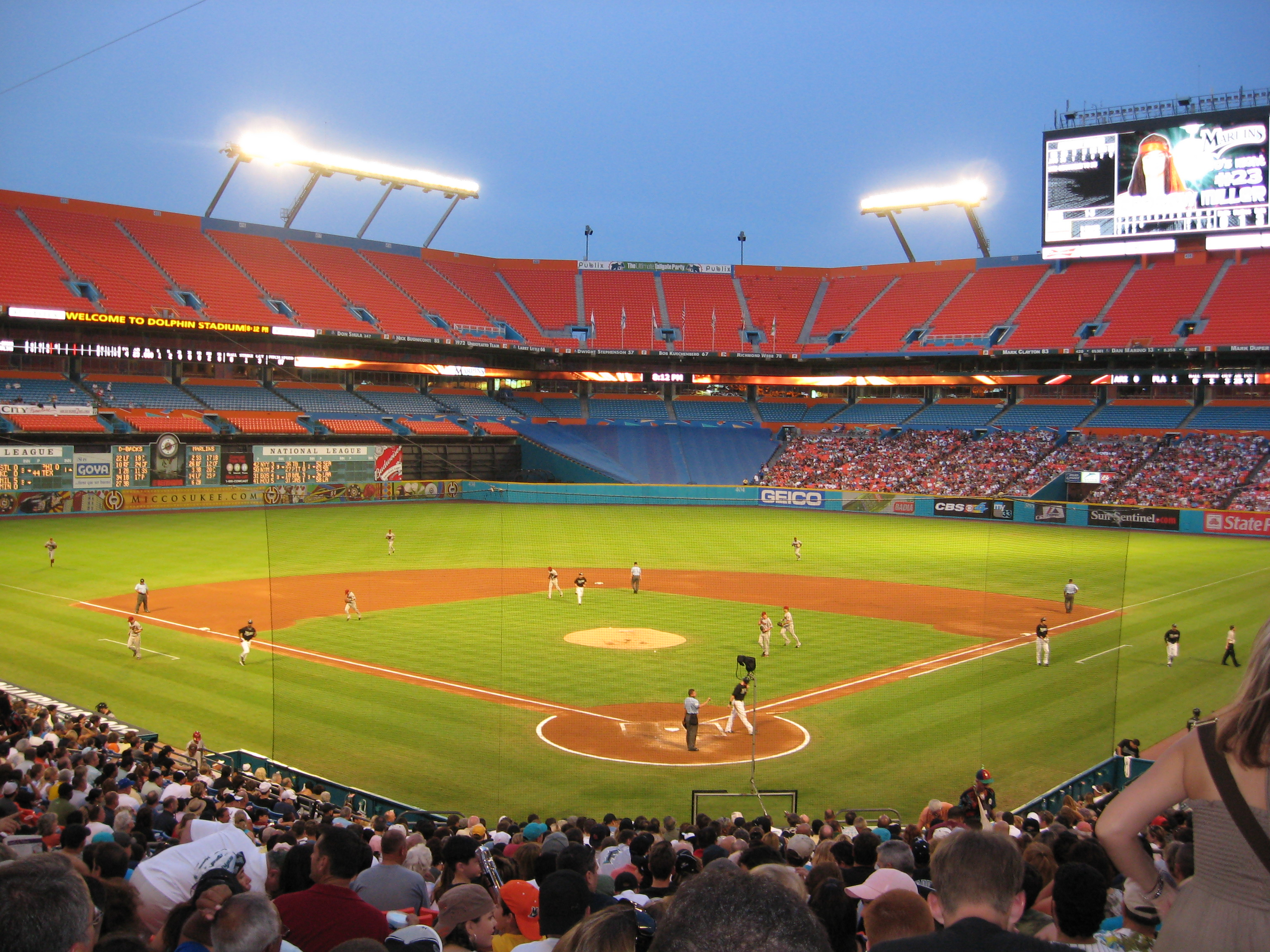
Sun Life Stadium, where the Marlins played from their inaugural season in 1993 until the 2011 season.

This is a list of seasons completed by the Miami Marlins, a professional baseball franchise based in Miami Gardens, Florida, originally the Florida Marlins from 1993 until 2011. The Marlins are a member of both the Major League Baseball's (MLB) National League Eastern Division and the National League (NL) itself. For the first nineteen seasons, the Marlins played their home games at Sun Life Stadium. Beginning with the 2012 Season Marlins play home games at Marlins Park in Little Havana. Despite winning two World Series titles in their history (1997 and 2003), they are one of two MLB teams that have never won a division title in their history (the other being the Marlins' fellow expansion team from 1993, the Colorado Rockies). They are the only current team to have never made the postseason in consecutive seasons, as they have only reached the postseason four times (1997, 2003, 2020, 2023). The only MLB franchises who have won more World Series titles since the Marlins began play in 1993 are the New York Yankees, Boston Red Sox, and San Francisco Giants (the Atlanta Braves, Houston Astros, and St. Louis Cardinals have, like the Marlins, snared two championships each over the past 30 years).

== Table key ==
NLWC	National League Wild Card Series
NLDS	National League Division Series
NLCS	National League Championship Series
MVP	Most Valuable Player Award
CYA	Cy Young Award
ROY	Rookie of the Year Award
MOY	Manager of the Year Award
CB POY	Comeback Player of the Year Award
WS MVP	World Series Most Valuable Player Award

== Regular season results ==
World Series champions †	NL champions *	Division champions ^	Wild card berth (1995–present) ¤

Season	Level	League	Division	Finish	Wins	Losses	Win%	GB	Postseason	Awards
Florida Marlins
1993	MLB	NL	East	6th	64	98	.395	33		
1994	MLB	NL	East	5th	51	64	.443	23½	Playoffs cancelled^{[a]}	
1995	MLB	NL	East	4th	67	76	.469	22½		
1996	MLB	NL	East	3rd	80	82	.494	16		
1997	MLB †	NL *	East	2nd ¤	92	70	.568	9	Won NLDS (Giants) 3–0; Won NLCS (Braves) 4–2; Won World Series (Indians) 4–3 †	Liván Hernández (NLCS MVP & WS MVP)
1998	MLB	NL	East	5th	54	108	.333	52		
1999	MLB	NL	East	5th	64	98	.395	39		
2000	MLB	NL	East	3rd	79	82	.491	15½		
2001	MLB	NL	East	4th	76	86	.469	12		
2002	MLB	NL	East	4th	79	83	.488	23		
2003	MLB †	NL *	East	2nd ¤	91	71	.562	10	Won NLDS (Giants) 3–1; Won NLCS (Cubs) 4–3; Won World Series (Yankees) 4–2 †	Jack McKeon (MOY); Dontrelle Willis (ROY); Iván Rodríguez (NLCS MVP); Josh Beckett (WS MVP)
2004	MLB	NL	East	3rd	83	79	.512	13		
2005	MLB	NL	East	3rd	83	79	.512	7		
2006	MLB	NL	East	4th	78	84	.481	19		Joe Girardi (MOY); Hanley Ramírez (ROY)
2007	MLB	NL	East	5th	71	91	.438	18		
2008	MLB	NL	East	3rd	84	77	.522	7½		
2009	MLB	NL	East	2nd	87	75	.537	6		Chris Coghlan (ROY)
2010	MLB	NL	East	3rd	80	82	.494	17		
2011	MLB	NL	East	5th	72	90	.444	30		
Miami Marlins
2012	MLB	NL	East	5th	69	93	.426	29		
2013	MLB	NL	East	5th	62	100	.383	34		José Fernández (ROY)
2014	MLB	NL	East	4th	77	85	.475	19		Casey McGehee (CB POY)
2015	MLB	NL	East	3rd	71	91	.438	19		
2016	MLB	NL	East	3rd	79	82	.491	15½		
2017	MLB	NL	East	2nd	77	85	.475	20		Giancarlo Stanton (MVP)
2018	MLB	NL	East	5th	63	98	.391	26½		
2019	MLB	NL	East	5th	57	105	.352	40		
2020	MLB	NL	East	2nd ¤	31	29	.517	4	Won NLWC (Cubs) 2–0; Lost NLDS (Braves) 3–0	Don Mattingly (MOY)
2021	MLB	NL	East	4th	67	95	.414	21½		
2022	MLB	NL	East	4th	69	93	.426	32		Sandy Alcántara (CYA)
2023	MLB	NL	East	3rd ¤	84	78	.519	20	Lost NLWC (Phillies) 2–0	Skip Schumaker (MOY)
2024	MLB	NL	East	5th	62	100	.383	33		
2025	MLB	NL	East	3rd	79	83	.488	17		
2026	MLB	NL	East	3rd	80	82	.494	14		
Totals					Wins	Losses	Win%			
Totals					2,462	2,874	.461	All-time regular season record (1993–2025)		
Totals					24	16	.600	All-time postseason record		
Totals					2,486	2,890	.462	All-time regular and postseason record		

These statistics are current as of the conclusion of the 2025 Major League Baseball season.

- ^{a} The 1994–95 Major League Baseball strike ended the season on August 11, as well as cancelling the entire postseason. Because of this, no team was officially awarded any division titles.

== Record by decade ==
The following table describes the Marlins' MLB win–loss record by decade.

Decade	Wins	Losses	Pct
1990s	472	596	.442
2000s	811	807	.501
2010s	707	911	.437
2020s	472	560	.457
All-time	2,462	2,874	.461

These statistics are from Baseball-Reference.com's Miami Marlins History & Encyclopedia.

== Postseason appearances ==
Year	Wild Card Game/Series		LDS		LCS		World Series	
1997	None (Won NL Wild Card)		San Francisco Giants	W (3–0)	Atlanta Braves	W (4–2)	Cleveland Indians	W (4–3)
2003	None (Won NL Wild Card)		San Francisco Giants	W (3–1)	Chicago Cubs	W (4–3)	New York Yankees	W (4–2)
2020	Chicago Cubs	W (2–0)	Atlanta Braves	L (0–3)				
2023	Philadelphia Phillies	L (0–2)						

== Postseason record by year ==
The Marlins have made the postseason four times in their history, with their first being in 1997 and the most recent being in 2023.

Year	Finish	Round	Opponent	Result		
1997	World Series Champions	NLDS	San Francisco Giants	Won	3	0
1997	World Series Champions	NLCS	Atlanta Braves	Won	4	2
1997	World Series Champions	World Series	Cleveland Indians	Won	4	3
2003	World Series Champions	NLDS	San Francisco Giants	Won	3	1
2003	World Series Champions	NLCS	Chicago Cubs	Won	4	3
2003	World Series Champions	World Series	New York Yankees	Won	4	2
2020	Wild Card Berth	NLWC	Chicago Cubs	Won	2	0
2020	Wild Card Berth	NLDS	Atlanta Braves	Lost	0	3
2023	Wild Card Berth	NLWC	Philadelphia Phillies	Lost	0	2
4	Totals			7–2	24	16

== See also ==
- Florida Marlins team records
