= List of Arizona Diamondbacks seasons =

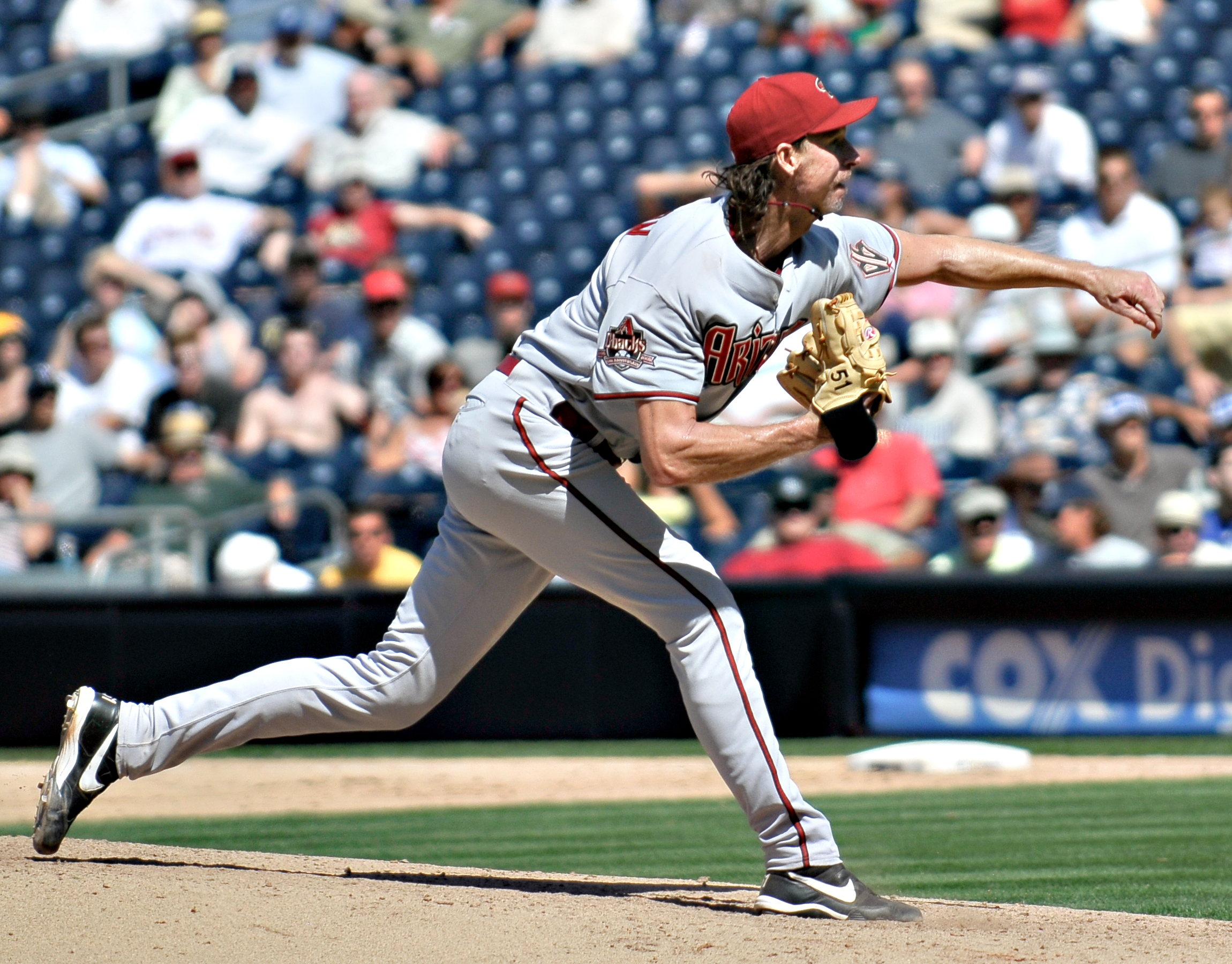
Randy Johnson pitched for the Diamondbacks from 1999 to 2004 and from 2007 to 2008.

The Arizona Diamondbacks are a Major League Baseball team based in Phoenix, Arizona. The Diamondbacks are part of the National League and play in the West Division. Since beginning play in the 1998 season, the Diamondbacks called Chase Field (formerly named "Bank One Ballpark") their home. The name "Diamondbacks" was inspired by the Western diamondback snake and was chosen among thousands of entries in a contest to name the team.

Arizona made their Major League debut in the 1998 baseball season when they became the 14th expansion team. After going 65–97 in their first season, the Diamondbacks were the National League West Division Champions in the 1999 baseball season when they went 100–62. They made it to the National League Division Series but they lost to the New York Mets. The early success of the franchise was exemplified in 2001 when the Diamondbacks defeated the New York Yankees in a dramatic seven game World Series in 2001. In the 2002 baseball season, Arizona returned to the playoffs but were defeated by the St. Louis Cardinals in the National League Division Series. Post season baseball did not return to the desert until the 2007 season when Arizona lost to the Colorado Rockies in the National League Championship Series. The following season, Arizona narrowly missed the playoffs, when they finished 2 games behind the Los Angeles Dodgers. In 2011, the Diamondbacks won their division but were ousted by the Milwaukee Brewers in the National League Division Series. In 2017, the Arizona Diamondbacks finished 2nd in the NL West, and they played in the National League Wild Card Game against the Rockies. This would be the team's first appearance in the postseason as a Wild Card team. Arizona won 11–8 and played the Dodgers in the NLDS that year but were swept in 3 games. In 2023,

== Table Key ==
NLDS	National League Division Series
NLCS	National League Championship Series
MVP	Most Valuable Player Award
CYA	Cy Young Award
ROY	Rookie of the Year Award
MOY	Manager of the Year Award
CB POY	Comeback Player of the Year Award
WS MVP	World Series Most Valuable Player Award

== Regular season results ==
World Series champions †	NL champions *	Division champions (1969–present) ^	Wild card berth (1995–present) ¤

Season	Level	League	Division	Finish	Wins	Losses	Win%	GB	Postseason	Awards
1998	MLB	NL	West	5th	65	97	.401	33		
1999	MLB	NL	West ^	1st	100	62	.617	—	Lost NLDS (Mets) 3–1	Randy Johnson (CYA)
2000	MLB	NL	West	3rd	85	77	.525	12		Randy Johnson (CYA)
2001	MLB †	NL *	West ^	1st	92	70	.568	—	Won NLDS (Cardinals) 3–2; Won NLCS (Braves) 4–1; Won World Series (Yankees) 4–3 †	Randy Johnson (CYA, co-WS MVP); Curt Schilling (co-WS MVP)
2002	MLB	NL	West ^	1st	98	64	.605	—	Lost NLDS (Cardinals) 3–0	Randy Johnson (CYA)
2003	MLB	NL	West	3rd	84	78	.519	16½		
2004	MLB	NL	West	5th	51	111	.315	42		
2005	MLB	NL	West	2nd	77	85	.475	5		
2006	MLB	NL	West	4th	76	86	.469	12		Brandon Webb (CYA)
2007	MLB	NL	West ^	1st	90	72	.556	—	Won NLDS (Cubs) 3–0; Lost NLCS (Rockies) 4–0	Bob Melvin (MOY)
2008	MLB	NL	West	2nd	82	80	.506	2		
2009	MLB	NL	West	5th	70	92	.432	25		
2010	MLB	NL	West	5th	65	97	.401	27		
2011	MLB	NL	West ^	1st	94	68	.580	—	Lost NLDS (Brewers) 3–2	Kirk Gibson (MOY)
2012	MLB	NL	West	3rd	81	81	.500	13		
2013	MLB	NL	West	2nd	81	81	.500	11		
2014	MLB	NL	West	5th	64	98	.395	30		
2015	MLB	NL	West	3rd	79	83	.488	13		
2016	MLB	NL	West	4th	69	93	.426	22		
2017	MLB	NL	West	2nd ¤	93	69	.574	11	Won NLWC (Rockies); Lost NLDS (Dodgers) 3–0	Torey Lovullo (MOY)
2018	MLB	NL	West	3rd	82	80	.506	9½		
2019	MLB	NL	West	2nd	85	77	.525	21		
2020	MLB	NL	West	5th	25	35	.417	18		
2021	MLB	NL	West	5th	52	110	.321	55		
2022	MLB	NL	West	4th	74	88	.457	37		
2023	MLB	NL *	West	2nd ¤	84	78	.519	16	Won NLWC (Brewers) 2–0; Won NLDS (Dodgers) 3–0; Won NLCS (Phillies) 4–3; Lost World Series (Rangers) 4–1	Corbin Carroll (ROY)
2024	MLB	NL	West	3rd	89	73	.549	9		
2025	MLB	NL	West	4th	80	82	.494	13		
2026	MLB	NL	West	3rd	86	76	.531	14		
Totals					Wins	Losses	Win%			
Totals					2,253	2,343	.490	All-time regular season record		
Totals					28	29	.491	All-time postseason record		
Totals					2,281	2,372	.490	All-time regular and postseason record		

These statistics are current as of September 27, 2026. Bold denotes a playoff season, pennant or championship; italics denote an active season.

== Record by decade ==
The following table describes the Diamondbacks' MLB win–loss record by decade.

Decade	Wins	Losses	Win %
1990s	165	159	.509
2000s	805	815	.497
2010s	793	827	.490
2020s	490	542	.475
All-time	2253	2343	.490

These statistics are from Baseball-Reference.com's Arizona Diamondbacks History & Encyclopedia, and are current as of September 27, 2026.

== Postseason appearances ==
Year	Wild Card Game/Series		LDS		LCS		World Series	
1999	None (Won NL West)		New York Mets	L (1–3)				
2001	None (Won NL West)		St. Louis Cardinals	W (3–2)	Atlanta Braves	W (4–1)	New York Yankees	W (4–3)
2002	None (Won NL West)		St. Louis Cardinals	L (0–3)				
2007	None (Won NL West)		Chicago Cubs	W (3–0)	Colorado Rockies	L (0–4)		
2011	None (Won NL West)		Milwaukee Brewers	L (2–3)				
2017	Colorado Rockies W		Los Angeles Dodgers	L (0–3)				
2023	Milwaukee Brewers	W (2–0)	Los Angeles Dodgers	W (3–0)	Philadelphia Phillies	W (4–3)	Texas Rangers	L (1–4)

== Post-season record by year ==
The Diamondbacks have made the postseason seven times in their history, with their first being in 1999 and the most recent being in 2023.

Year	Finish	Round	Opponent	Result		
1999	NL West Champions	NLDS	New York Mets	Lost	1	3
2001	World Series Champions	NLDS	St. Louis Cardinals	Won	3	2
2001	World Series Champions	NLCS	Atlanta Braves	Won	4	1
2001	World Series Champions	World Series	New York Yankees	Won	4	3
2002	NL West Champions	NLDS	St. Louis Cardinals	Lost	0	3
2007	NL West Champions	NLDS	Chicago Cubs	Won	3	0
2007	NL West Champions	NLCS	Colorado Rockies	Lost	0	4
2011	NL West Champions	NLDS	Milwaukee Brewers	Lost	2	3
2017	NL Wild Card Champions	Wild Card Game	Colorado Rockies	Won	1	0
2017	NL Wild Card Champions	NLDS	Los Angeles Dodgers	Lost	0	3
2023	National League Champions	Wild Card Series	Milwaukee Brewers	Won	2	0
2023	National League Champions	NLDS	Los Angeles Dodgers	Won	3	0
2023	National League Champions	NLCS	Philadelphia Phillies	Won	4	3
2023	National League Champions	World Series	Texas Rangers	Lost	1	4
7	Totals			8–6	28	29

== See also ==
- Arizona Diamondbacks team records
- List of Arizona Diamondbacks Opening Day starting pitchers
