= List of Major League Baseball franchise postseason streaks =

This is a list of Major League Baseball (MLB) franchise postseason and World Series streaks. The list includes only the modern World Series between the American League (AL) and the National League (NL), not the various 19th-century championship series.

The Atlanta Braves and the Los Angeles Dodgers have the longest postseason streak in MLB history, at 14 consecutive non-strike affected postseasons.

Overall the most successful postseason team in MLB history is the New York Yankees, who have achieved three of the four instances of a franchise winning more than two World Series championships in a row (one streak each of durations 3, 4, and 5 seasons) and five of the six instances of a franchise winning the league pennant (i.e., an appearance in the World Series) more than three times in a row (three streaks of 4 seasons and two streaks of 5 seasons). The only other franchises to achieve these milestones are the Oakland Athletics, who won three consecutive championships from 1972 to 1974, and the New York Giants, who won four consecutive pennants from 1921 to 1924. The Yankees also achieved a remarkable run of appearing in 15 of the 18 World Series from 1947 to 1964.

Beginning in 1969, MLB split into four divisions, and the winners of each competed in the League Championship Series, with the winners advancing to the World Series. When a multi-tier playoff system was implemented in 1995, the LCS remained the series that determined the pennant-winner. The longest streak of consecutive LCS appearances belongs to the Atlanta Braves with eight in a row from 1991 to 1999 (not counting 1994, when there were no playoffs).

Further expansion of the postseason began in 1995, with eight teams entering the playoffs each year (further expanded to ten teams in 2012 and twelve in 2022). In this era, the Braves entered the postseason 14 consecutive years from 1991 to 2005 (again not counting 1994), while the Yankees had a streak of 13 appearances from 1995 to 2007. The Los Angeles Dodgers (2013–2026) have an ongoing streak of 14 seasons.

== World Series championship streaks ==
The Yankees have achieved one streak each of three, four, and five championships in a row, and the Athletics have achieved a streak of three in a row. Back-to-back championships have been achieved an additional eleven times.

Bold indicates a current streak.

Length	Team	Seasons
5	New York Yankees	1949–1953
4	New York Yankees	1936–1939
3	Oakland Athletics	1972–1974
3	New York Yankees	1998–2000
2	Chicago Cubs	1907–1908
2	Philadelphia Athletics	1910–1911
2	Boston Red Sox	1915–1916
2	New York Giants	1921–1922
2	New York Yankees	1927–1928
2	Philadelphia Athletics	1929–1930
2	New York Yankees	1961–1962
2	Cincinnati Reds	1975–1976
2	New York Yankees	1977–1978
2	Toronto Blue Jays	1992–1993
2	Los Angeles Dodgers	2024–2025

Near streaks: Runs during which a franchise won World Series championships at least 70% of the time, with gaps of no more than one year:

Length	Team	Seasons
6 of 7	New York Yankees	1947, 1949–1953
6 of 8	New York Yankees	1936–1939, 1941, 1943
4 of 5	New York Yankees	1996, 1998–2000
3 of 4	Philadelphia Athletics	1910–1911, 1913
3 of 4	Boston Red Sox	1915–1916, 1918

== World Series appearance (pennant) streaks ==
The Yankees have achieved five separate streaks of four or five pennants in a row, and the Giants achieved one streak of four in a row. Three pennants in a row have been achieved an additional twelve times, and back-to-back pennants an additional twenty-one times.

Bold indicates a current streak.

Length	Team	Seasons
5	New York Yankees	1949–1953
5	New York Yankees	1960–1964
4	New York Giants	1921–1924
4	New York Yankees	1936–1939
4	New York Yankees	1955–1958
4	New York Yankees	1998–2001
3	Chicago Cubs	1906–1908
3	Detroit Tigers	1907–1909
3	New York Giants	1911–1913
3	New York Yankees	1921–1923
3	New York Yankees	1926–1928
3	Philadelphia Athletics	1929–1931
3	New York Yankees	1941–1943
3	St. Louis Cardinals	1942–1944
3	Baltimore Orioles	1969–1971
3	Oakland Athletics	1972–1974
3	New York Yankees	1976–1978
3	Oakland Athletics	1988–1990
2	Philadelphia Athletics	1910–1911
2	Philadelphia Athletics	1913–1914
2	Boston Red Sox	1915–1916
2	Washington Senators	1924–1925
2	St. Louis Cardinals	1930–1931
2	Detroit Tigers	1934–1935
2	New York Giants	1936–1937
2	Cincinnati Reds	1939–1940
2	Brooklyn Dodgers	1952–1953
2	Brooklyn Dodgers	1955–1956
2	Milwaukee Braves	1957–1958
2	Los Angeles Dodgers	1965–1966
2	St. Louis Cardinals	1967–1968
2	Cincinnati Reds	1975–1976
2	Los Angeles Dodgers	1977–1978
2	Atlanta Braves	1991–1992
2	Toronto Blue Jays	1992–1993
2	Atlanta Braves	1995–1996
2	Philadelphia Phillies	2008–2009
2	Texas Rangers	2010–2011
2	Kansas City Royals	2014–2015
2	Los Angeles Dodgers	2017–2018
2	Houston Astros	2021–2022
2	Los Angeles Dodgers	2024–2025

Near streaks: Runs during which a franchise won its league pennant at least 70% of the time, with gaps of no more than one year:

Length	Team	Seasons
15 of 18	New York Yankees	1947, 1949–1953, 1955–1958, 1960–1964
7 of 8	New York Yankees	1936–1939, 1941–1943
6 of 8	New York Yankees	1996, 1998–2001, 2003
4 of 5	Chicago Cubs	1906–1908, 1910
4 of 5	Philadelphia Athletics	1910–1911, 1913–1914
4 of 5	St. Louis Cardinals	1942–1944, 1946
4 of 5	Brooklyn Dodgers	1952–1953, 1955–1956
4 of 5	Atlanta Braves	1991–1992*, 1995–1996
3 of 4	Boston Red Sox	1915–1916, 1918
3 of 4	St. Louis Cardinals	1928, 1930–1931
3 of 4	Los Angeles Dodgers	1963, 1965–1966
3 of 4	Los Angeles Dodgers	2017–2018, 2020
3 of 4	Houston Astros	2019, 2021–2022

* Because the 1994 playoffs were cancelled, the year 1994 is not counted as either a part or an interruption of any streak.

== League Championship Series appearance streaks ==
The Braves appeared in every LCS held from 1991 to 1999, which is eight in a row, winning five league pennants and one World Series championship during that time. The American League record is held by the Houston Astros, who appeared in the ALCS in seven straight seasons from 2017 to 2023 that resulted in four pennants and two world titles. They are the only team to appear in an LCS in seven straight completed seasons, as the 90s Braves did not compete in the 1994 NLCS due to the season not being completed. Incidentally, the LCS was the only round preceding the World Series until 1995, when the Division Series was created; the Wild Card Series has acted as the first round for most of the playoff teams on a regular basis since 2022.

The Oakland Athletics in their "Swingin' A's" era previously held the AL record with five appearances in a row, which saw them win three world titles. The Yankees and Cardinals have each achieved an LCS appearance streak of four in a row. Three LCS appearances in a row have been achieved an additional thirteen times, and back-to-back LCS appearances an additional twenty-two times.

Three teams (the Orioles, Pirates, and Yankees) achieved multiple LCS appearance streaks in and around the 1970s, each adding up to five appearances in six years.

The LCS began in 1969. Before that, the two regular season champions were awarded the pennants and went directly to the World Series.

Bold indicates a current streak.

Length	Team	Seasons
8	Atlanta Braves	1991–1993*, 1995–1999
7	Houston Astros	2017–2023
5	Oakland Athletics	1971–1975
4	New York Yankees	1998–2001
4	St. Louis Cardinals	2011–2014
3	Baltimore Orioles	1969–1971
3	Pittsburgh Pirates	1970–1972
3	Kansas City Royals	1976–1978
3	New York Yankees	1976–1978
3	Philadelphia Phillies	1976–1978
3	Oakland Athletics	1988–1990
3	Pittsburgh Pirates	1990–1992
3	Toronto Blue Jays	1991–1993
3	St. Louis Cardinals	2004–2006
3	Philadelphia Phillies	2008–2010
3	Detroit Tigers	2011–2013
3	Chicago Cubs	2015–2017
3	Los Angeles Dodgers	2016–2018
**3**	**Los Angeles Dodgers**	**2024–2026**
2	Minnesota Twins	1969–1970
2	Cincinnati Reds	1972–1973
2	Baltimore Orioles	1973–1974
2	Pittsburgh Pirates	1974–1975
2	Cincinnati Reds	1975–1976
2	Los Angeles Dodgers	1977–1978
2	New York Yankees	1980–1981
2	Kansas City Royals	1984–1985
2	Baltimore Orioles	1996–1997
2	Cleveland Indians	1997–1998
2	New York Mets	1999–2000
2	Seattle Mariners	2000–2001
2	Boston Red Sox	2003–2004
2	New York Yankees	2003–2004
2	Houston Astros	2004–2005
2	Boston Red Sox	2007–2008
2	Los Angeles Dodgers	2008–2009
2	New York Yankees	2009–2010
2	Texas Rangers	2010–2011
2	Kansas City Royals	2014–2015
2	Toronto Blue Jays	2015–2016
2	Atlanta Braves	2020–2021
2	Los Angeles Dodgers	2020–2021
2	Philadelphia Phillies	2022–2023
**2**	**Milwaukee Brewers**	**2025–2026**

Near streaks: Runs during which a franchise appeared in its league championship series at least 70% of the time, with gaps of no more than one year:

Length	Team	Seasons
9 of 10	Atlanta Braves	1991–1993*, 1995–1999, 2001
7 of 9	New York Yankees	1996, 1998–2001, 2003–2004
5 of 6	Baltimore Orioles	1969–1971, 1973–1974
5 of 6	Pittsburgh Pirates	1970–1972, 1974–1975
5 of 6	New York Yankees	1976–1978, 1980–1981
5 of 6	Los Angeles Dodgers	2016–2018, 2020–2021
5 of 7	Cincinnati Reds	1970, 1972–1973, 1975–1976
5 of 7	St. Louis Cardinals	2000, 2002, 2004–2006
4 of 5	Kansas City Royals	1976–1978, 1980
4 of 5	Philadelphia Phillies	1976–1978, 1980
4 of 5	Oakland Athletics	1988–1990, 1992
4 of 5	Toronto Blue Jays	1989, 1991–1993
3 of 4	Cleveland Indians	1995, 1997–1998
3 of 4	New York Yankees	2009–2010, 2012

* Because the 1994 playoffs were cancelled, the year 1994 is not counted as either a part or an interruption of any streak.

== Postseason appearance streaks ==
The Braves and the Yankees have achieved respective streaks of 14 and 13 consecutive appearances in the postseason, centered on the 1990s and 2000s. The Dodgers have an ongoing streak of 14 consecutive appearances, while the Astros and Braves saw respective streaks of eight and seven end in 2025. Five postseason appearances in a row have been achieved an additional eight times, four in a row an additional nine times, three in a row an additional thirty times, and back-to-back postseasons an additional fifty-three times.

Regarding near-streaks, the Yankees appeared in 17 of 18 postseasons from 1995 to 2012, 15 of 18 postseasons from 1947 to 1964 (see pennant near-streaks above), 10 of 12 postseasons from 2015 to 2026, and 7 of 8 postseasons twice, from 1936 to 1943 (see pennant near-streaks above). The Astros have appeared in 10 of 12 postseasons, from 2015 to 2026. In addition, the Brewers (2018 to 2026) have appeared in 8 of 9 postseasons, while six teams have appeared in postseason near-streaks of 6 (having appeared in 6 of 7 or 8 consecutive postseasons). The Indians (1995 to 2001), St. Louis Cardinals (twice, 2000 to 2006 and 2009 to 2015), and Red Sox (2003 to 2009) appeared in 6 of 7 postseasons, while the Phillies (1976 to 1983) and Angels (2002 to 2009) appeared in 6 of 8 postseasons.

Postseason appearance streaks have become more common in recent years, as the postseason has been progressively restructured to include more teams (originally two, four since 1969, eight since 1995, ten since 2012, sixteen in 2020, twelve since 2022). The Astros, who have reached the postseason eight straight times from 2017 to 2024, are the only team to ever win a postseason series in seven straight seasons.

Bold indicates a current streak.

Length	Team	Seasons
14	Atlanta Braves	1991–1993*, 1995–2005
**14**	**Los Angeles Dodgers**	**2013–2026**
13	New York Yankees	1995–2007
8	Houston Astros	2017–2024
7	Atlanta Braves	2018–2024
6	New York Yankees	2017–2022
5	New York Yankees	1949–1953
5	New York Yankees	1960–1964
5	Oakland Athletics	1971–1975
5	Cleveland Indians	1995–1999
5	Philadelphia Phillies	2007–2011
5	St. Louis Cardinals	2011–2015
5	Tampa Bay Rays	2019–2023
**5**	**Philadelphia Phillies**	**2022–2026**
4	New York Giants	1921–1924
4	New York Yankees	1936–1939
4	New York Yankees	1955–1958
4	Oakland Athletics	2000–2003
4	New York Yankees	2009–2012
4	Detroit Tigers	2011–2014
4	Chicago Cubs	2015–2018
4	Milwaukee Brewers	2018–2021
4	St. Louis Cardinals	2019–2022
**4**	**Milwaukee Brewers**	**2023–2026**
3	Chicago Cubs	1906–1908
3	Detroit Tigers	1907–1909
3	New York Giants	1911–1913
3	New York Yankees	1921–1923
3	New York Yankees	1926–1928
3	Philadelphia Athletics	1929–1931
3	New York Yankees	1941–1943
3	St. Louis Cardinals	1942–1944
3	Baltimore Orioles	1969–1971
3	Pittsburgh Pirates	1970–1972
3	Kansas City Royals	1976–1978
3	New York Yankees	1976–1978
3	Philadelphia Phillies	1976–1978
3	Oakland Athletics	1988–1990
3	Pittsburgh Pirates	1990–1992
3	Toronto Blue Jays	1991–1993
3	Houston Astros	1997–1999
3	St. Louis Cardinals	2000–2002
3	Minnesota Twins	2002–2004
3	Boston Red Sox	2003–2005
3	St. Louis Cardinals	2004–2006
3	Boston Red Sox	2007–2009
3	Los Angeles Angels of Anaheim	2007–2009
3	Texas Rangers	2010–2012
3	Oakland Athletics	2012–2014
3	Pittsburgh Pirates	2013–2015
3	Boston Red Sox	2016–2018
3	Cleveland Indians	2016–2018
3	Oakland Athletics	2018–2020
**3**	**New York Yankees**	**2024–2026**
**3**	**Cleveland Guardians**	**2024–2026**
**3**	**San Diego Padres**	**2024–2026**
2	Philadelphia Athletics	1910–1911
2	Philadelphia Athletics	1913–1914
2	Boston Red Sox	1915–1916
2	Washington Senators	1924–1925
2	St. Louis Cardinals	1930–1931
2	Detroit Tigers	1934–1935
2	New York Giants	1936–1937
2	Cincinnati Reds	1939–1940
2	Brooklyn Dodgers	1952–1953
2	Brooklyn Dodgers	1955–1956
2	Milwaukee Braves	1957–1958
2	Los Angeles Dodgers	1965–1966
2	St. Louis Cardinals	1967–1968
2	Minnesota Twins	1969–1970
2	Cincinnati Reds	1972–1973
2	Baltimore Orioles	1973–1974
2	Pittsburgh Pirates	1974–1975
2	Cincinnati Reds	1975–1976
2	Los Angeles Dodgers	1977–1978
2	Houston Astros	1980–1981
2	Kansas City Royals	1980–1981
2	New York Yankees	1980–1981
2	Philadelphia Phillies	1980–1981
2	Milwaukee Brewers	1981–1982
2	Kansas City Royals	1984–1985
2	Los Angeles Dodgers	1995–1996
2	Baltimore Orioles	1996–1997
2	Boston Red Sox	1998–1999
2	Texas Rangers	1998–1999
2	New York Mets	1999–2000
2	Seattle Mariners	2000–2001
2	Arizona Diamondbacks	2001–2002
2	San Francisco Giants	2002–2003
2	Houston Astros	2004–2005
2	Anaheim Angels/Los Angeles Angels of Anaheim	2004–2005
2	San Diego Padres	2005–2006
2	Chicago Cubs	2007–2008
2	Los Angeles Dodgers	2008–2009
2	Minnesota Twins	2009–2010
2	Tampa Bay Rays	2010–2011
2	Atlanta Braves	2012–2013
2	Cincinnati Reds	2012–2013
2	Kansas City Royals	2014–2015
2	New York Mets	2015–2016
2	Texas Rangers	2015–2016
2	Toronto Blue Jays	2015–2016
2	Washington Nationals	2016–2017
2	Colorado Rockies	2017–2018
2	Minnesota Twins	2019–2020
2	Chicago White Sox	2020–2021
2	Toronto Blue Jays	2022–2023
2	Baltimore Orioles	2023–2024
2	Detroit Tigers	2024–2025
**2**	**Boston Red Sox**	**2025–2026**
**2**	**Chicago Cubs**	**2025–2026**

Near streaks: Runs during which a franchise appeared in the postseason at least 70% of the time, with gaps of no more than one year:

Length	Team	Seasons
17 of 18	New York Yankees	1995–2007, 2009–2012
15 of 18	New York Yankees	1947, 1949–1953, 1955–1958, 1960–1964
**10 of 12**	**Houston Astros**	**2015, 2017–2024, 2026**
**10 of 12**	**New York Yankees**	**2015, 2017–2022, 2024–2026**
**8 of 9**	**Atlanta Braves**	**2018–2024, 2026**
**8 of 9**	**Milwaukee Brewers**	**2018–2021, 2023–2026**
**8 of 11**	**Cleveland Indians/Guardians**	**2016–2018, 2020, 2022, 2024–2026**
7 of 8	New York Yankees	1936–1939, 1941–1943
6 of 7	Cleveland Indians	1995–1999, 2001
6 of 7	St. Louis Cardinals	2000–2002, 2004–2006
6 of 7	Boston Red Sox	2003–2005, 2007–2009
6 of 7	St. Louis Cardinals	2009, 2011–2015
6 of 8	Philadelphia Phillies	1976–1978, 1980–1981, 1983
6 of 8	Anaheim Angels/Los Angeles Angels of Anaheim	2002, 2004–2005, 2007–2009
5 of 6	Baltimore Orioles	1969–1971, 1973–1974
5 of 6	Pittsburgh Pirates	1970–1972, 1974–1975
5 of 6	Kansas City Royals	1976–1978, 1980–1981
5 of 6	New York Yankees	1976–1978, 1980–1981
5 of 6	Chicago Cubs	2015–2018, 2020
5 of 7	Cincinnati Reds	1970, 1972–1973, 1975–1976
4 of 5	Chicago Cubs	1906–1908, 1910
4 of 5	Philadelphia Athletics	1910–1911, 1913–1914
4 of 5	St. Louis Cardinals	1942–1944, 1946
4 of 5	Brooklyn Dodgers	1952–1953, 1955–1956
4 of 5	Oakland Athletics	1988–1990, 1992
4 of 5	Toronto Blue Jays	1989, 1991–1993
4 of 5	Houston Astros	1997–1999, 2001
4 of 5	Minnesota Twins	2002–2004, 2006
**4 of 5**	**San Diego Padres**	**2022, 2024–2026**
3 of 4	Boston Red Sox	1915–1916, 1918
3 of 4	St. Louis Cardinals	1928, 1930–1931
3 of 4	Los Angeles Dodgers	1963, 1965–1966
3 of 4	Texas Rangers	1996, 1998–1999
3 of 4	Arizona Diamondbacks	1999, 2001–2002
3 of 4	San Francisco Giants	2000, 2002–2003
3 of 4	Los Angeles Dodgers	2006, 2008–2009
3 of 4	Tampa Bay Rays	2008, 2010–2011
3 of 4	Tampa Bay Rays	2010–2011, 2013
3 of 4	Atlanta Braves	2010, 2012–2013
3 of 4	Cincinnati Reds	2010, 2012–2013
3 of 4	Washington Nationals	2014, 2016–2017
3 of 4	Washington Nationals	2016–2017, 2019
3 of 4	Minnesota Twins	2017, 2019–2020
3 of 4	Toronto Blue Jays	2020, 2022–2023
3 of 4	Toronto Blue Jays	2022–2023, 2025

* Because the 1994 playoffs were cancelled, the year 1994 is not counted as either a part or an interruption of any streak.

== Postseason series win streaks ==
=== Consecutive seasons with at least one postseason series win ===
The Houston Astros have achieved a record 7 consecutive postseasons with at least one postseason series win, from 2017–2023. The Atlanta Braves are the next-closest team in consecutive seasons with at least one playoff series win, with 5 from 1995–1999. Four consecutive seasons with at least one postseason series win have been achieved twice, three seasons in a row an additional five times, and back-to-back postseason appearances with a series win an additional sixteen times.

Postseason series wins have become more common in recent years, as the postseason has been progressively restructured to include more teams (originally two, four since 1969, eight since 1995, ten since 2012, sixteen in 2020, twelve since 2022). Streaks predating 1995 are also included in the list of pennant streaks above.

Bold indicates a current streak since 1969.

Length	Team	Seasons
7	Houston Astros	2017–2023
5	Atlanta Braves	1995–1999
4	New York Yankees	1998–2001
4	St. Louis Cardinals	2011–2014
3	Baltimore Orioles	1969–1971
3	Oakland Athletics	1972–1974
3	New York Yankees	1976–1978
3	Oakland Athletics	1988–1990
3	St. Louis Cardinals	2004–2006
3	Philadelphia Phillies	2008–2010
3	Detroit Tigers	2011–2013
3	Chicago Cubs	2015–2017
3	Los Angeles Dodgers	2016–2018
3	New York Yankees	2017–2019
**3**	**Los Angeles Dodgers**	**2024–2026**
**3**	**New York Yankees**	**2024–2026**
2	Cincinnati Reds	1975–1976
2	Los Angeles Dodgers	1977–1978
2	Atlanta Braves	1991–1992
2	Toronto Blue Jays	1992–1993
2	Baltimore Orioles	1996–1997
2	Cleveland Indians	1997–1998
2	New York Mets	1999–2000
2	Seattle Mariners	2000–2001
2	Boston Red Sox	2003–2004
2	New York Yankees	2003–2004
2	Houston Astros	2004–2005
2	Boston Red Sox	2007–2008
2	Los Angeles Dodgers	2008–2009
2	New York Yankees	2009–2010
2	Texas Rangers	2010–2011
2	Kansas City Royals	2014–2015
2	Toronto Blue Jays	2015–2016
2	Atlanta Braves	2020–2021
2	Los Angeles Dodgers	2020–2021
2	Philadelphia Phillies	2022–2023
2	Detroit Tigers	2024–2025
**2**	**Milwaukee Brewers**	**2025–2026**

Near streaks: Runs during which a franchise appeared in the postseason and won at least one playoff series at least 70% of the time, with gaps of no more than one year:

Length	Team	Seasons
8 of 10	Atlanta Braves	1991–1992*, 1995–1999, 2001
7 of 9	New York Yankees	1996, 1998–2001, 2003–2004
6 of 7	Los Angeles Dodgers	2015–2018, 2020–2021
5 of 7	St. Louis Cardinals	2000, 2002, 2004–2006
3 of 4	Cleveland Indians	1995, 1997–1998
3 of 4	New York Yankees	2009–2010, 2012

* Because the 1994 playoffs were cancelled, the year 1994 is not counted as either a part or an interruption of any streak.

=== Most consecutive postseason series wins in team history ===
This is a sortable table of all 30 current MLB teams. Ten teams have multiple winning streaks where they won an equal number of postseason series before a loss.

Updated through the conclusion of the 2026 Major League Baseball postseason.

^	Denotes active streaks

Team	Seasons	Series won	Postseason series	Opponent	Streak ending loss
Arizona Diamondbacks; 2 (3 win) streaks	2001	3	2001 NLDS; 2001 NLCS; **2001 World Series**	Cardinals; Braves; Yankees	2002 NLDS (Cardinals)
Arizona Diamondbacks; 2 (3 win) streaks	2023	3	2023 NL Wild Card; 2023 NLDS; 2023 NLCS	Brewers; Dodgers; Phillies	2023 World Series (Rangers)
Athletics	1972–1974	6	1972 ALCS; **1972 World Series**; 1973 ALCS; **1973 World Series**; 1974 ALCS; **1974 World Series**	Tigers; Reds; Orioles; Mets; Orioles; Dodgers	1975 ALCS (Red Sox)
Atlanta Braves	1995–1996	5	1995 NLDS; 1995 NLCS; **1995 World Series**; 1996 NLDS; 1996 NLCS	Rockies; Reds; Indians; Dodgers; Cardinals	1996 World Series (Yankees)
Baltimore Orioles; 2 (3 win) streaks	1970–1971	3	1970 ALCS; **1970 World Series**; 1971 ALCS	Twins; Reds; Athletics	1971 World Series (Pirates)
Baltimore Orioles; 2 (3 win) streaks	1983, 1996	3	1983 ALCS; **1983 World Series**; 1996 ALDS	White Sox; Phillies; Indians	1996 ALCS (Yankees)
Boston Red Sox; 2 (5 win) streaks	1903, 1912, 1915–1916, 1918	5	**1903 World Series**; **1912 World Series**; **1915 World Series**; **1916 World Series**; **1918 World Series**	Pirates; Giants; Phillies; Robins; Cubs	1946 World Series (Cardinals)
Boston Red Sox; 2 (5 win) streaks	2018, 2021	5	2018 ALDS; 2018 ALCS; **2018 World Series**; 2021 AL Wild Card; 2021 ALDS	Yankees; Astros; Dodgers; Yankees; Rays	2021 ALCS (Astros)
Chicago Cubs	2016–2017	4	2016 NLDS; 2016 NLCS; **2016 World Series**; 2017 NLDS	Giants; Dodgers; Indians; Nationals	2017 NLCS (Dodgers)
Chicago White Sox	2005	3	2005 ALDS; 2005 ALCS; **2005 World Series**	Red Sox; Angels; Astros	2008 ALDS (Rays)
Cincinnati Reds	1975–1976	4	1975 NLCS; **1975 World Series**; 1976 NLCS; **1976 World Series**	Pirates; Red Sox; Phillies; Yankees	1979 NLCS (Pirates)
Cleveland Guardians; 4 (2 win) streaks	1920, 1948	2	**1920 World Series**; **1948 World Series**	Robins; Braves	1954 World Series (Giants)
Cleveland Guardians; 4 (2 win) streaks	1995	2	1995 ALDS; 1995 ALCS	Red Sox; Mariners	1995 World Series (Braves)
Cleveland Guardians; 4 (2 win) streaks	1997	2	1997 ALDS; 1997 ALCS	Yankees; Orioles	1997 World Series (Marlins)
Cleveland Guardians; 4 (2 win) streaks	2016	2	2016 ALDS; 2016 ALCS	Red Sox; Blue Jays	2016 World Series (Cubs)
Colorado Rockies	2007	2	2007 NLDS; 2007 NLCS	Phillies; Diamondbacks	2007 World Series (Red Sox)
Detroit Tigers; 4 (2 win) streaks	1945, 1968	2	**1945 World Series**; **1968 World Series**	Cubs; Cardinals	1972 ALCS (Athletics)
Detroit Tigers; 4 (2 win) streaks	1984	2	1984 ALCS; **1984 World Series**	Royals; Padres	1987 ALCS (Twins)
Detroit Tigers; 4 (2 win) streaks	2006	2	2006 ALDS; 2006 ALCS	Yankees; Athletics	2006 World Series (Cardinals)
Detroit Tigers; 4 (2 win) streaks	2012	2	2012 ALDS; 2012 ALCS	Athletics; Yankees	2012 World Series (Giants)
Houston Astros; 2 (4 win) streaks	2017–2018	4	2017 ALDS; 2017 ALCS; **2017 World Series**; 2018 ALDS	Red Sox; Yankees; Dodgers; Indians	2018 ALCS (Red Sox)
Houston Astros; 2 (4 win) streaks	2022–2023	4	2022 ALDS; 2022 ALCS; **2022 World Series**; 2023 ALDS	Mariners; Yankees; Phillies; Twins	2023 ALCS (Rangers)
Kansas City Royals	1985, 2014	5	1985 ALCS; **1985 World Series**; 2014 AL Wild Card; 2014 ALDS; 2014 ALCS	Blue Jays; Cardinals; Athletics; Angels; Orioles	2014 World Series (Giants)
Los Angeles Angels	2002	3	2002 ALDS; 2002 ALCS; **2002 World Series**	Yankees; Angels; Giants	2004 ALDS (Red Sox)
Los Angeles Dodgers	2024–2026	8	2024 NLDS; 2024 NLCS; **2024 World Series**; 2025 NL Wild Card; 2025 NLDS; 2025 NLCS; **2025 World Series**; 2026 NLDS	Padres; Mets; Yankees; Reds; Phillies; Brewers; Blue Jays; Braves	2026 NLCS (Brewers)
Miami Marlins	1997, 2003, 2020	7	1997 NLDS; 1997 NLCS; **1997 World Series**; 2003 NLDS; 2003 NLCS; **2003 World Series**; 2020 NL Wild Card	Giants; Braves; Indians; Giants; Cubs; Yankees; Cubs	2020 NLDS (Braves)
Milwaukee Brewers ^	2026	3	2026 NLDS; 2026 NLCS; **2026 World Series**	Padres; Dodgers; Rays	TBD
Minnesota Twins	1987, 1991, 2002	5	1987 ALCS; **1987 World Series**; 1991 ALCS; **1991 World Series**; 2002 ALDS	Tigers; Cardinals; Blue Jays; Braves; Athletics	2002 ALCS (Angels)
New York Mets	1969, 1973	3	1969 NLCS; **1969 World Series**; 1973 NLCS	Braves; Orioles; Reds	1973 World Series (Athletics)
New York Yankees	1998–2001	11	1998 ALDS; 1998 ALCS; **1998 World Series**; 1999 ALDS; 1999 ALCS; **1999 World Series**; 2000 ALDS; 2000 ALCS; **2000 World Series**; 2001 ALDS; 2001 ALCS	Rangers; Indians; Padres; Rangers; Red Sox; Braves; Athletics; Mariners; Mets; Athletics; Mariners	2001 World Series (Diamondbacks)
Philadelphia Phillies	2008–2009	5	2008 NLDS; 2008 NLCS; **2008 World Series**; 2009 NLDS; 2009 NLCS	Brewers; Dodgers; Rays; Rockies; Dodgers	2009 World Series (Yankees)
Pittsburgh Pirates; 3 (2 win) streaks	1909, 1925	2	**1909 World Series**; **1925 World Series**	Tigers; Senators	1927 World Series (Yankees)
Pittsburgh Pirates; 3 (2 win) streaks	1971	2	1971 NLCS; **1971 World Series**	Giants; Orioles	1972 NLCS (Reds)
Pittsburgh Pirates; 3 (2 win) streaks	1979	2	1979 NLCS; **1979 World Series**	Reds; Orioles	1990 NLCS (Reds)
San Diego Padres; 2 (2 win) streaks	1998	2	1998 NLDS; 1998 NLCS	Astros; Braves	1998 World Series (Yankees)
San Diego Padres; 2 (2 win) streaks	2022	2	2022 NL Wild Card; 2022 NLDS	Mets; Dodgers	2022 NLCS (Phillies)
San Francisco Giants	2010, 2012, 2014, 2016	11	2010 NLDS; 2010 NLCS; **2010 World Series**; 2012 NLDS; 2012 NLCS; **2012 World Series**; 2014 NL Wild Card; 2014 NLDS; 2014 NLCS; **2014 World Series**; 2016 NL Wild Card	Braves; Phillies; Rangers; Reds; Cardinals; Tigers; Pirates; Nationals; Cardinals; Royals; Mets	2016 NLDS (Cubs)
Seattle Mariners; 5 (1 win) streaks	1995	1	1995 ALDS	Yankees	1995 ALCS (Indians)
Seattle Mariners; 5 (1 win) streaks	2000	1	2000 ALDS	White Sox	2000 ALCS (Yankees)
Seattle Mariners; 5 (1 win) streaks	2001	1	2001 ALDS	Indians	2001 ALCS (Yankees)
Seattle Mariners; 5 (1 win) streaks	2022	1	2022 AL Wild Card	Blue Jays	2022 ALDS (Astros)
Seattle Mariners; 5 (1 win) streaks	2025	1	2025 ALDS	Tigers	2025 ALCS (Blue Jays)
St. Louis Cardinals	2011–2012	5	2011 NLDS; 2011 NLCS; **2011 World Series**; 2012 NL Wild Card; 2012 NLDS	Phillies; Brewers; Rangers; Braves; Nationals	2012 NLCS (Giants)
Tampa Bay Rays	2020	3	2020 AL Wild Card; 2020 ALDS; 2020 ALCS	Blue Jays; Yankees; Astros	2020 World Series (Dodgers)
Texas Rangers ^	2023	4	2023 AL Wild Card; 2023 ALDS; 2023 ALCS; **2023 World Series**	Rays; Orioles; Astros; Diamondbacks	TBD
Toronto Blue Jays	1992–1993, 2015	5	1992 ALCS; **1992 World Series**; 1993 ALCS; **1993 World Series**; 2015 ALDS	Athletics; Braves; White Sox; Phillies; Rangers	2015 ALCS (Royals)
Washington Nationals ^	2019	4	2019 NL Wild Card; 2019 NLDS; 2019 NLCS; **2019 World Series**	Brewers; Dodgers; Cardinals; Astros	TBD
Team	Streak lasted	Series won	Postseason series	Opponent	Streak ending loss

== See also ==
- List of Major League Baseball franchise postseason droughts
- List of Major League Baseball postseason series
- List of Major League Baseball postseason teams
- List of NFL franchise post-season streaks
- List of NBA franchise post-season streaks
- List of NHL franchise post-season appearance streaks
