= George Whiteman =

American baseball player (1884–1947)

- Outfielder
- Born: December 23, 1884; Peoria, Illinois, U.S.
- Died: February 10, 1947 (aged 62); Houston, Texas, U.S.
- Batted: Right Threw: Right

MLB debut
- September 13, 1907, for the Boston Americans

Last MLB appearance
- September 2, 1918, for the Boston Red Sox

MLB statistics
- Batting average: .271
- Home runs: 1
- Runs batted in: 31
- Stats at Baseball Reference

Teams
- Boston Americans (1907); New York Yankees (1913); Boston Red Sox (1918)

Career highlights and awards
- World Series champion (1918)

George (Lucky) Whiteman (December 23, 1884 – February 10, 1947) was an American outfielder in Major League Baseball, playing mainly as a left fielder for the Boston Americans / Red Sox (1907, 1918) and New York Yankees (1913) between 1907 and 1918. Listed at 5' 7", 160 lb., Whiteman batted and threw right-handed. He was born in Peoria, Illinois.

In a three-season career, Whiteman posted a .271 batting average with one home run and 31 runs batted in in 85 games played.

A 35-year-old minor league journeyman, Whiteman filled in outfield for the Boston Red Sox whenever Babe Ruth was pitching. Prior to the 1918 season, he had played in only 15 major league games since 1907 before becoming the surprise hero of the World Champion Boston team. Although Ruth and Carl Mays won two games apiece in the World Series, Whiteman batted just .250 (5-for-20) against the Chicago Cubs but delivered some key hits and made several run-saving catches in the outfield, specially in the eighth inning of the final game won by the Red Sox, 2–1, at Fenway Park. He never appeared in another major league game after the Series.

After baseball, Whiteman served as a deputy police officer. Whiteman suffered a heart attack in early 1947. As a result, locals and colleagues from baseball helped get blood transfusions for Whiteman. He died at his home on West Eighth Street in Houston, Texas on February 10, 1947. His funeral was held on February 12, 1947 at Hollywood Cemetery in Houston. His teammates on the 1921 Houston Buffaloes Gene Bailey and Charles Miller helped served as pallbearers at his funeral.
