= Carl Mays =

American baseball player (1891–1971)

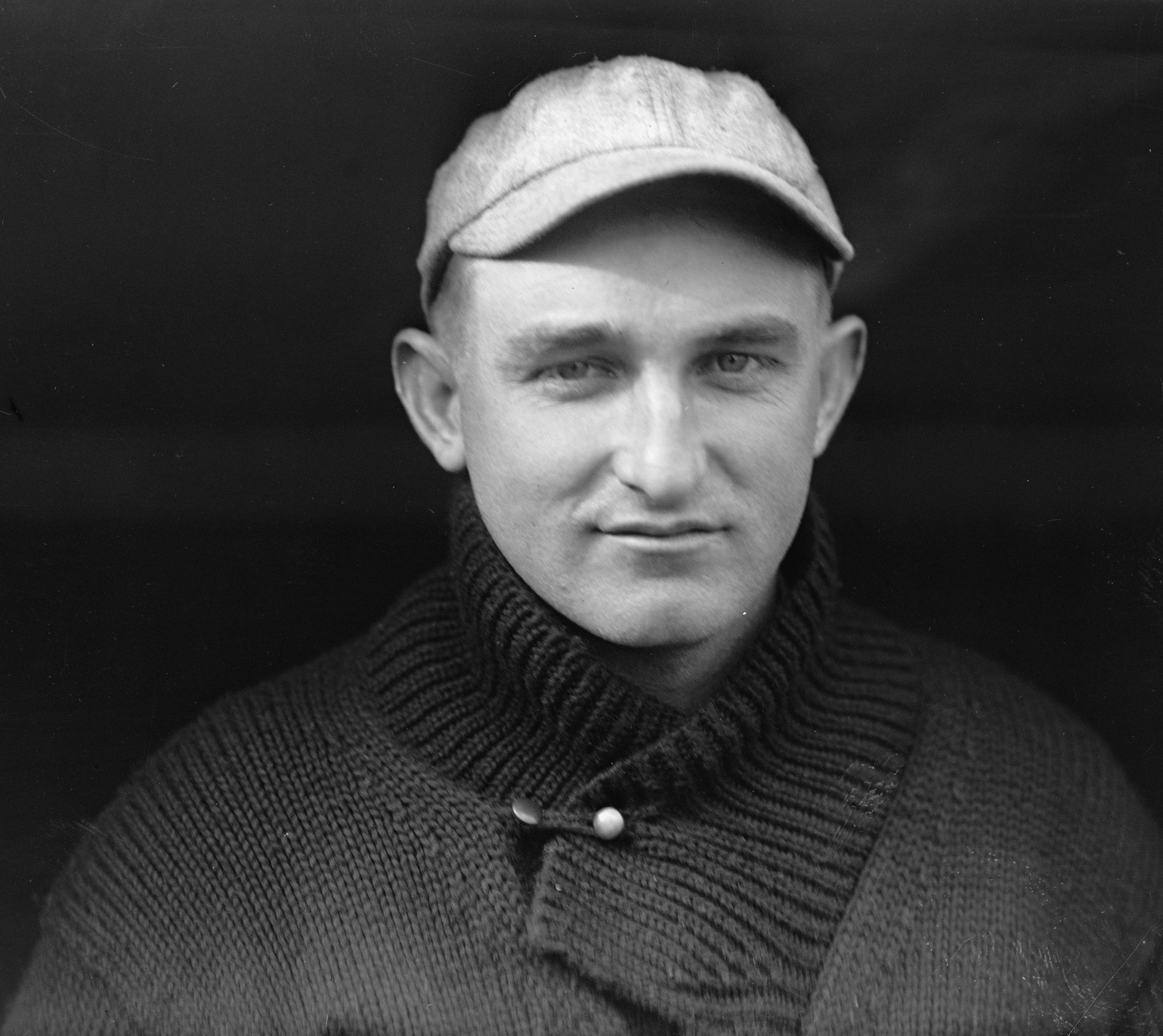
- Mays in 1915
- Pitcher
- Born: November 12, 1891; Liberty, Kentucky, U.S.
- Died: April 4, 1971 (aged 79); El Cajon, California, U.S.
- Batted: Left Threw: Right

MLB debut
- April 15, 1915, for the Boston Red Sox

Last MLB appearance
- September 24, 1929, for the New York Giants

MLB statistics
- Win–loss record: 207–126
- Earned run average: 2.92
- Strikeouts: 862
- Stats at Baseball Reference

Teams
- Boston Red Sox (1915–1919); New York Yankees (1919–1923); Cincinnati Reds (1924–1928); New York Giants (1929)

Career highlights and awards
- 4× World Series champion (1915, 1916, 1918, 1923); MLB wins leader (1921)

Carl William Mays (November 12, 1891 – April 4, 1971) was an American professional baseball pitcher who played 15 seasons in Major League Baseball from 1915 to 1929. During his career, he won over 200 games, 27 in 1921 alone, and was a member of four World Series-champion teams. On August 16, 1920, Mays threw the pitch that fatally injured Ray Chapman of the Cleveland Indians, the only major league player to die as a direct result of an on-field injury.

== Playing career ==
According to his World War I draft card, Carl William Mays was born November 12, 1891, in Atterson, Kentucky, one of five sons born to Callie Louisa Mays and William Henry Mays. His father was a Methodist minister, and was responsible for his strict religious upbringing. When Mays was 12, his father died and his mother moved the family to Kingfisher, Oklahoma, to live near her sister-in-law. Mays internalized his grief, settling into a surly persona with few if any close friends. His best personal support group was a couple named Pierce and Genevieve Mays, who were relatives and served as a surrogate uncle and aunt. As a professional baseball player, he had few friends in the baseball world. In part because of his strict Methodist upbringing, Mays refused to pitch on Sundays, as did legendary pitcher Christy Mathewson.

Mays quit high school before graduating and began to earn a living as a baseball player on semi-pro teams in Oklahoma, Kansas, and Utah. In 1912, he entered the minor leagues as a member of the Boise, Idaho, team in the Class D Western Tri-State League. After a season in Boise, in 1913 Mays played one season for the Portland, Oregon, team in the Class A Northwest League. In 1914, Mays was drafted by the Triple-A International League's Providence Grays. The Grays were an affiliate of the Detroit Tigers, and the Tigers sold his contract to the Boston Red Sox.

In one version of the story, Mays learned his underhand style of pitching from Dizzy Dismukes, a pitcher in Negro league baseball. In another, he was taught the technique by Joe McGinnity when McGinnity coached the Tacoma team during Mays's stint with Portland. Mays was nicknamed "Sub", a reference to his submarine pitching motion, and he was known to throw a spitball. The pitch was legal at the time of the Chapman incident, but Chapman's death was partly responsible for its ban in Major League Baseball (although the ban wouldn't take effect until 1921). Mays was also known for a habit of throwing inside to any batter who hugged the plate; despite a stellar win–loss record, he was typically among the American League leaders in hit batsmen. Mays was also regarded as an exceptional fielder, and was capable enough with the bat that he was often used as a pinch-hitter.

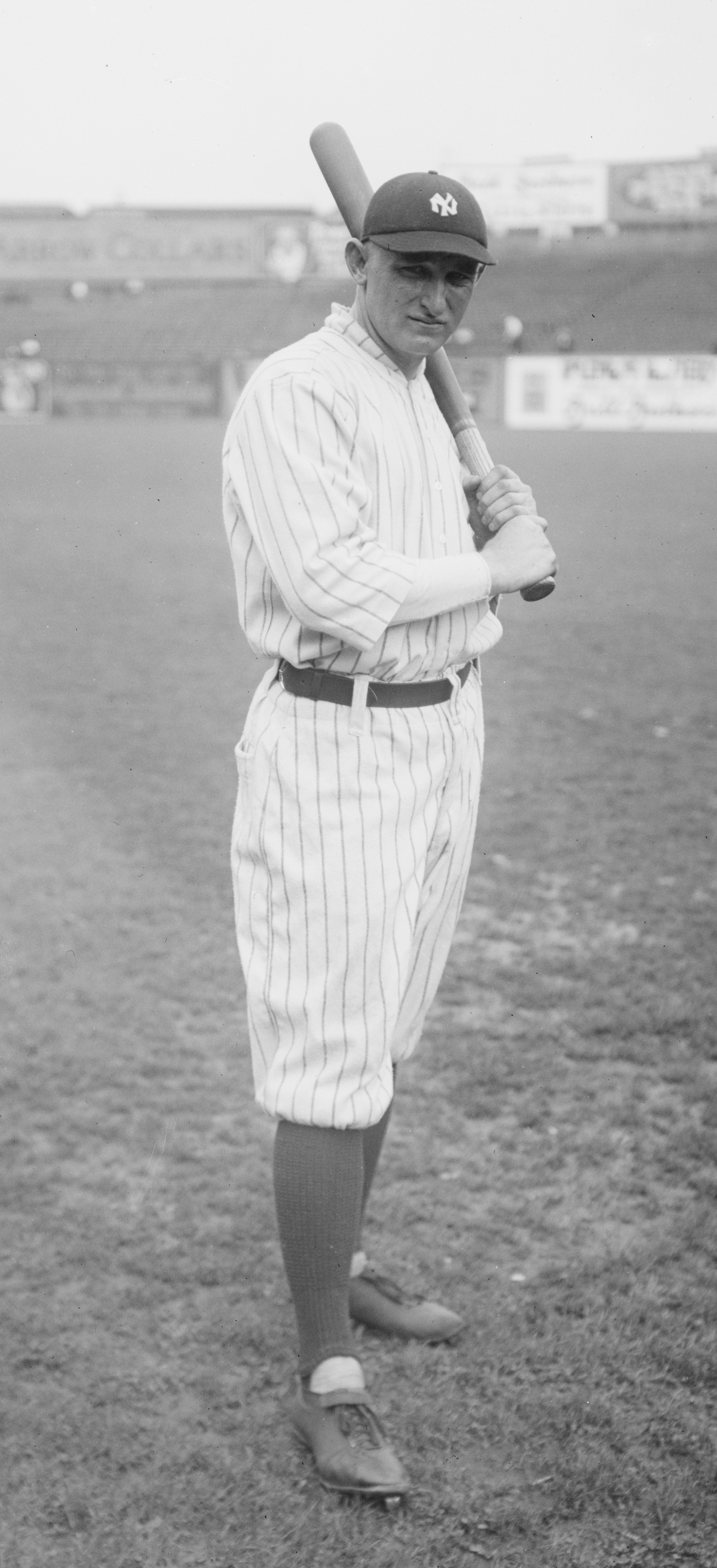
Mays in a batting stance at the Polo Grounds some time during 1919–1922.

In his rookie season of 1915, Mays appeared in 34 games for the Red Sox. Used mostly in relief, he won 6 games and lost 5. During the regular season, Mays was involved in a heated confrontation with Ty Cobb of the Tigers. Mays threw near Cobb each time he came to bat. In the eighth inning, after another close pitch, Cobb threw his bat in Mays' direction, calling him a "no good son of a bitch". Mays responded by calling Cobb a "yellow dog". After order was restored, Mays hit Cobb directly on the wrist. The Tigers won the game 6–1 and the incident cemented Mays' reputation as a head hunter. The Red Sox won that year's World Series by defeating the Philadelphia Phillies in five games, but Mays did not play.

In 1916, Mays appeared in 44 games, and started 24. 18 of his starts were complete games, and he posted a record of 18 wins and 13 losses, with an earned run average of 2.39. In the 1916 World Series, Mays was the losing pitcher in Game 3, but the Red Sox defeated the Brooklyn Robins 4 games to 1. In 1917, The Red Sox posted a second-place finish. Mays pitched in 35 games, and his record was 22 wins and 9 losses, with an ERA of 1.74. Mays went 22–13 in the 1918 season, with an ERA of 2.21. The Red Sox returned to the World Series, and defeated the Chicago Cubs in 6 games. Mays was the winning pitcher in games 3 and 6, both by scores of 2–1.

Mays married for the first time shortly after the end of the 1918 season. After a brief honeymoon in Missouri, he departed by train from his home in Mansfield for St. Louis as the leader of a group of 18 men who had enlisted in the United States Army for World War I. They were sworn in on November 6, five days before the Armistice that ended that war. Influenza broke out while Mays was stationed at Washington University in St. Louis as a member of the Student Army Training Corps's vocational training unit, and several individuals from his train trip died during the outbreak. The Armistice ended the need to expand the Army, and Mays was discharged in time to begin the 1919 baseball season.

Though he was by now established as one of the game's premier pitchers, Mays began the 1919 season with a record of five wins and eleven losses. His slow start resulted in the Red Sox trading him to the New York Yankees that July. Mays went 9–3 after the trade, resulting in a combined 1919 record of 14–14. Mays regained his form in 1920. The Yankees finished in third place, but posted a record of 95 wins and 59 losses, only three games out of first place. Mays went 26–11, including 26 complete games.

== Death of Ray Chapman ==
The Yankees were trailing the Indians, 3–0, when Ray Chapman came to the plate in the top of the fifth inning on August 16, 1920, in a game played in New York City at the Polo Grounds. Mays was pursuing his 100th career win that day. Chapman had a sacrifice bunt in the first inning and popped up to Yankee first baseman Wally Pipp in the third. Angered that Chapman was crowding the plate, Mays let loose with a high fastball that he claimed was in the strike zone but that Chapman apparently never saw. The impact of the ball striking Chapman in the head was so loud that Mays, thinking it had hit Chapman's bat and was in play, caught the ball as it bounced onto the field and threw it to Pipp at first base. Chapman, trying to take his base after the hit by pitch, fell to the ground twice and was unable to get up. Cleveland teammate Tris Speaker raced from the on-deck circle to check on Chapman. He was joined by several players from the Indians and Yankees. Mays, however, never left the mound. Chapman was replaced by pinch runner Harry Lunte, while Mays stayed in the game and continued to pitch until being replaced in the ninth inning. The Yankees rallied in the bottom of the ninth, but ultimately lost to the Indians, 4–3.

Chapman was taken to a hospital, where surgeons operated and discovered a skull fracture. He initially seemed to rally after the surgery but died early in the morning on the following day. The New York District Attorney determined that the incident was an accident, and no charges were filed.

In an interview three months after Chapman's death, Mays expressed regret for the outcome, but he stated that he did not feel any guilt, as he had not hit Chapman on purpose; indeed, some of Chapman's last words before losing consciousness were "I'm all right; tell Mays not to worry". Mays received the wrath of many opposing players, who believed he beaned Chapman deliberately. Chapman had been one of the few players that Ty Cobb was on friendly terms with, so Cobb was the most vocal critic, suggesting that someone should give Mays a taste of his own medicine by hitting Mays with a pitch the same way Mays hit Chapman.

== Later career ==
Mays enjoyed his best season in 1921, when he led the American League in wins (27), innings pitched (336 2/3), games pitched (49), and winning percentage (.750). However, that same season Mays, pitching for the Yankees, played in a World Series that others later accused him of helping to throw, bringing back memories of the Black Sox scandal from just two years prior. These rumors were never proven, but they persisted long enough that, combined with an already negative reputation among other players both from the Chapman incident and from having a personality that few found agreeable, he was never elected to the Baseball Hall of Fame despite having lifetime statistics comparable to some other pitchers who were.

In a 15-year career with the Boston Red Sox, New York Yankees, Cincinnati Reds, and New York Giants, Mays compiled a 207–126 record with 29 shutouts, 862 strikeouts and a 2.92 earned run average when the league average was 3.48. He won twenty or more games five times. He was one of 42 players to have won 200 games when he retired. He was also noted for his skills with a bat, hitting five home runs, recording 111 runs batted in, and sporting a lifetime .268 batting average—an unusually high mark for a pitcher. Mays is the only Red Sox pitcher to toss two nine-inning complete game victories on the same day, as he beat the Philadelphia Athletics 12–0 and 4–1 on August 30, 1918. Those wins put the Red Sox one step from clinching the league championship, as they led Cleveland by 3 1/2 games with four remaining to play.

== Later years and death ==
After his playing career, Mays was the owner and operator of a baseball school in Oregon; among his most notable attendees was Johnny Pesky. Mays also worked as a scout for the Cleveland Indians, Milwaukee / Atlanta Braves, and Kansas City Royals. In addition, his stepson, Jerry Bartow, coached baseball at Hoover High School in San Diego, and each spring Mays made the trip from Oregon to volunteer as a mentor and assistant coach. In an interview, Mays said he especially enjoyed working with young pitchers, but that he regarded his most important task as teaching members of the team how to play the game safely.

He died on April 4, 1971, in El Cajon, California, and is buried in River View Cemetery, Portland, Oregon (Sec. 13, Lot 49, Sp. 7).

== Family ==
After the 1918 World Series, Mays married Marjorie Fredricka Madden, a graduate of the New England Conservatory of Music whom he had met during his rookie season. They were the parents of two children, Carl Jr. (1925–2017) and Elizabeth (Betty). His second wife was Esther Ugstead (1907–1990). All-Star pitcher Joe Mays, who played for the Minnesota Twins, Kansas City Royals, and Cincinnati Reds from 1999 to 2006, is a distant cousin of Mays.

== Legacy ==
In August 2008, Mays was one of the 10 former players who began their careers before 1943 to be considered by the Veterans Committee for induction into the National Baseball Hall of Fame in 2009. He was named on less than 25 percent of the ballots, thus was not selected for induction.

In 2021, indie-folk artist Cousin Wolf released a song entitled "Carl Mays" as part of an album called Nine Innings.

== See also ==
- Baseball Hall of Fame balloting, 2009
- List of Major League Baseball career wins leaders
- List of Major League Baseball annual saves leaders
- List of Major League Baseball annual wins leaders
- List of Major League Baseball career hit batsmen leaders
