= List of Chicago Cubs seasons =

The following lists the results of every season of the Chicago Cubs baseball club of Major League Baseball beginning in 1870 and continuing to 1876 as a charter member of the National League (NL). The White Stockings changed their name in 1890 to the Chicago Colts and again in 1898 to the Chicago Orphans until finally settling in 1903 with the name of the Chicago Cubs.

While the organization Major League Baseball recognizes only seasons in select leagues from 1876 to the present as major league, many baseball historians consider major league baseball to have started earlier. Some include seasons from the National Association, and others include its predecessor organization, the National Association of Base Ball Players.

The Chicago Cubs have completed 153 seasons of baseball. Within this time, the Cubs have won 17 National League pennants, 3 World Series championships, 3 pre-World Series Championships, and tied for 2 pre-World Series Championships. By virtue of their pennants and playoff championships, the Cubs can claim to be the best team in baseball in eight different seasons. However, they also lay claim to the longest championship drought in North American sports history: 108 seasons from their second World Series title in 1908 to their third in 2016.

The Cubs have been members of three organized leagues, beginning with the amateur National Association of Base Ball Players in 1870, followed by three seasons in the professional National Association of Professional Base Ball Players, and the National League since 1876.

== Year by year ==
Key to colors

†	World Series champions
*	National League champions
^	Division champions
¤	Wild Card berth (1995–present)

Key to abbreviations

- NA – National Association of Professional Base Ball Players
- NABBP – National Association of Base Ball Players
- NL – National League
- NLWC – National League Wild Card Game/Series
- NLDS – National League Division Series
- NLCS – National League Championship Series

Key to awards

- MVP – Most Valuable Player Award
- CYA – Cy Young Award
- ROY – Rookie of the Year Award
- MOY – Manager of the Year Award
- CB POY – Comeback Player of the Year Award
- WS MVP – World Series Most Valuable Player Award

Chicago Cubs regular season record by season
MLB season	Team season	League	Division	Regular season					Postseason results	Awards
MLB season	Team season	League	Division	Finish	W	L	Pct	GB	Postseason results	Awards
Chicago White Stockings
1870	1870	NABBP *		1st	22	7	.759	—		
1871	1871	NA		2nd	19	9	.679	2		
1874	1874	NA		5th	28	31	.475	18.5		
1875	1875	NA		6th	30	37	.448	35		
1876	1876	NL *		1st	52	14	.788	—		
1877	1877	NL		5th	26	33	.441	15½		
1878	1878	NL		4th	30	30	.500	11		
1879	1879	NL		4th	46	33	.582	10½		
1880	1880	NL *		1st	67	17	.798	—		
1881	1881	NL *		1st	56	28	.667	—		
1882	1882	NL *		1st	55	29	.655	—		
1883	1883	NL		2nd	59	39	.602	4		
1884	1884	NL		5th	62	50	.554	22		
1885	1885	NL *		1st	87	25	.777	—	Tied World Series (Browns) 3–3–1 (Note: The dispute in 1885 concerned Game 2, which was forfeited by St. Louis when they pulled their team off the field protesting an umpiring decision. The managers, Cap Anson and Charles Comiskey, initially agreed to disregard the game. When St. Louis won the final game and an apparent 3–2 Series championship, Chicago White Stockings owner Albert Spalding overruled his manager and declared that he wanted the forfeit counted. The result of a tied Series was that neither team got the prize money that had been posted by the owners before the Series (and was returned to them after they both agreed it was a tie).) *	
1886	1886	NL *		1st	90	34	.726	—	Lost World Series (Browns) 4–2 *	
1887	1887	NL		3rd	71	50	.587	6½		
1888	1888	NL		2nd	77	58	.570	9		
1889	1889	NL		3rd	67	65	.508	19		
Chicago Colts
1890	1890	NL		2nd	84 (Note: The official Chicago Cubs website reports 84 wins for 1890; however, Baseball-Reference.com reports 83 wins because the game on May 23 was ruled a no-decision even though the score was 10–8 in the Cubs' favor)	53	.613	6		
1891	1891	NL		2nd	82	53	.607	3½		
1892	1892	NL		7th	70	76	.479	30		
1893	1893	NL		9th	56	71	.441	29		
1894	1894	NL		8th	57	75	.432	34		
1895	1895	NL		4th	72	58	.554	15		
1896	1896	NL		5th	71	57	.555	18½		
1897	1897	NL		9th	59	73	.447	34		
Chicago Orphans
1898	1898	NL		4th	85	65	.567	17½		
1899	1899	NL		8th	75	73	.507	26		
1900	1900	NL		6th	65	75	.464	19		
1901	1901	NL		6th	53	86	.381	37		
1902	1902	NL		5th	68	69	.496	34		
Chicago Cubs
1903	1903	NL		3rd	82	56	.594	8		
1904	1904	NL		2nd	93	60	.608	13		
1905	1905	NL		3rd	92	61	.601	13		
1906	1906	NL *		1st	116	36	.763	—	Lost World Series (White Sox) 4–2 *	
1907 †	1907	NL *		1st	107	45	.704	—	Won World Series (Tigers) 4–0 †	
1908 †	1908	NL *		1st	99	55	.643	—	Won World Series (Tigers) 4–1 †	
1909	1909	NL		2nd	104	49	.680	6½		
1910	1910	NL *		1st	104	50	.675	—	Lost World Series (Athletics) 4–1 *	
1911	1911	NL		2nd	92	62	.597	7½		Frank Schulte (MVP)
1912	1912	NL		3rd	91	59	.607	11½		
1913	1913	NL		3rd	88	65	.575	13½		
1914	1914	NL		4th	78	76	.506	16½		
1915	1915	NL		4th	73	80	.477	17½		
1916	1916	NL		5th	67	86	.438	26½		
1917	1917	NL		5th	74	80	.481	24		
1918	1918	NL *		1st	84	45	.651	—	Lost World Series (Red Sox) 4–2 *	
1919	1919	NL		3rd	75	65	.536	21		
1920	1920	NL		5th	75	79	.487	18		
1921	1921	NL		7th	64	89	.418	30		
1922	1922	NL		5th	80	74	.519	13		
1923	1923	NL		4th	83	71	.539	12½		
1924	1924	NL		5th	81	72	.529	12		
1925	1925	NL		8th	68	86	.442	27½		
1926	1926	NL		4th	82	72	.532	7		
1927	1927	NL		4th	85	68	.556	8½		
1928	1928	NL		3rd	91	63	.591	4		
1929	1929	NL *		1st	98	54	.645	—	Lost World Series (Athletics) 4–1 *	Rogers Hornsby (MVP)
1930	1930	NL		2nd	90	64	.584	2		
1931	1931	NL		3rd	84	70	.545	17		
1932	1932	NL *		1st	90	64	.584	—	Lost World Series (Yankees) 4–0 *	
1933	1933	NL		3rd	86	68	.558	6		
1934	1934	NL		3rd	86	65	.570	8		
1935	1935	NL *		1st	100	54	.649	—	Lost World Series (Tigers) 4–2 *	Gabby Hartnett (MVP)
1936	1936	NL		2nd	87	67	.565	5		
1937	1937	NL		2nd	93	61	.604	3		
1938	1938	NL *		1st	89	63	.586	—	Lost World Series (Yankees) 4–0 *	
1939	1939	NL		4th	84	70	.545	13		
1940	1940	NL		5th	75	79	.487	25		
1941	1941	NL		6th	70	84	.455	30		
1942	1942	NL		6th	68	86	.442	38		
1943	1943	NL		5th	74	79	.484	30½		
1944	1944	NL		4th	75	79	.487	30		
1945	1945	NL *		1st	98	56	.636	—	Lost World Series (Tigers) 4–3 *	Phil Cavarretta (MVP)
1946	1946	NL		3rd	82	71	.536	14½		
1947	1947	NL		6th	69	85	.448	25		
1948	1948	NL		8th	64	90	.416	27½		
1949	1949	NL		8th	61	93	.396	36		
1950	1950	NL		7th	64	89	.418	26½		
1951	1951	NL		8th	62	92	.403	34½		
1952	1952	NL		5th	77	77	.500	19½		Hank Sauer (MVP)
1953	1953	NL		7th	65	89	.422	40		
1954	1954	NL		7th	64	90	.416	33		
1955	1955	NL		6th	72	81	.471	26		
1956	1956	NL		8th	60	94	.390	33		
1957	1957	NL		7th	62	92	.403	33		
1958	1958	NL		5th	72	82	.468	20		Ernie Banks (MVP)
1959	1959	NL		5th	74	80	.481	13		Ernie Banks (MVP)
1960	1960	NL		7th	60	94	.390	35		
1961	1961	NL		7th	64	90	.416	29		Billy Williams (ROY)
1962	1962	NL		9th	59	103	.364	42½		Ken Hubbs (ROY)
1963	1963	NL		7th	82	80	.506	17		
1964	1964	NL		8th	76	86	.469	17		
1965	1965	NL		8th	72	90	.444	25		
1966	1966	NL		10th	59	103	.364	36		
1967	1967	NL		3rd	87	74	.540	14		
1968	1968	NL		3rd	84	78	.519	13		
1969	1969	NL	East (Note: In 1969 MLB expanded by 4 teams to 12 in each league and split each league into an East and West division, the Cubs were placed in the National League East.)	2nd	92	70	.568	8		
1970	1970	NL	East	2nd	84	78	.519	5		
1971	1971	NL	East	3rd	83	79	.512	14		Fergie Jenkins (CYA)
1972	1972	NL	East	2nd	85	70	.548	11		
1973	1973	NL	East	5th	77	84	.478	5		
1974	1974	NL	East	6th	66	96	.407	22		
1975	1975	NL	East	5th	75	87	.463	17½		
1976	1976	NL	East	4th	75	87	.463	26		
1977	1977	NL	East	4th	81	81	.500	20		
1978	1978	NL	East	3rd	79	83	.488	11		
1979	1979	NL	East	5th	80	82	.494	18		Bruce Sutter (CYA)
1980	1980	NL	East	6th	64	98	.395	27		
1981	1981 (Note: The 1981 season was shortened by a player's strike. MLB decided to split the season into two halves with the division winner of each half playing in a Divisional Round of the playoffs.)	NL	East	6th	15	37	.288	17½		
1981	1981	NL	East	5th	23	28	.451	6		
1982	1982	NL	East	5th	73	89	.451	19		
1983	1983	NL	East	5th	71	91	.438	19		
1984	1984	NL	East ^	1st	96	65	.596	—	Lost NLCS (Padres) 3–2	Ryne Sandberg (MVP); Rick Sutcliffe (CYA); Jim Frey (MOY)
1985	1985	NL	East	4th	77	84	.478	23½		
1986	1986	NL	East	5th	70	90	.438	37		
1987	1987	NL	East	6th	76	85	.472	18½		Andre Dawson (MVP)
1988	1988	NL	East	4th	77	85	.475	24		
1989	1989	NL	East ^	1st	93	69	.574	—	Lost NLCS (Giants) 4–1	Jerome Walton (ROY); Don Zimmer (MOY)
1990	1990	NL	East	4th	77	85	.475	18		
1991	1991	NL	East	4th	77	83	.481	20		
1992	1992	NL	East	4th	78	84	.481	18		Greg Maddux (CYA)
1993	1993	NL	East	4th	84	78	.519	13		
1994	1994	NL	Central (Note: In 1994 MLB split each league into 3 divisions. The Cubs were placed in the newly created National League Central.)	5th	49	64	.434	16½	Playoffs cancelled (Note: There was no postseason in 1994 due to the 1994–95 Major League Baseball strike.)	
1995	1995	NL	Central	3rd	73	71	.507	12		
1996	1996	NL	Central	4th	76	86	.469	12		
1997	1997	NL	Central	5th	68	94	.420	16		
1998	1998	NL	Central	2nd ¤	90 (Note: The Cubs played 163 games to resolve a regular season record tie with the San Francisco Giants for the wild card playoff spot and forced a one-game playoff tiebreaker, which the Cubs won 5-3.)	73	.552	12½	Lost NLDS (Braves) 3–0	Sammy Sosa (MVP); Kerry Wood (ROY)
1999	1999	NL	Central	6th	67	95	.414	30		
2000	2000	NL	Central	6th	65	97	.401	30		
2001	2001	NL	Central	3rd	88	74	.543	5		
2002	2002	NL	Central	5th	67	95	.414	30		
2003	2003	NL	Central ^	1st	88	74	.543	—	Won NLDS (Braves) 3–2; Lost NLCS (Marlins) 4–3	
2004	2004	NL	Central	3rd	89	73	.549	16		
2005	2005	NL	Central	4th	79	83	.488	21		
2006	2006	NL	Central	6th	66	96	.407	17½		
2007	2007	NL	Central ^	1st	85	77	.525	—	Lost NLDS (Diamondbacks) 3–0	
2008	2008	NL	Central ^	1st	97	64	.602	—	Lost NLDS (Dodgers) 3–0	Geovany Soto (ROY); Lou Piniella (MOY)
2009	2009	NL	Central	2nd	83	78	.516	8½		
2010	2010	NL	Central	5th	75	87	.463	16		
2011	2011	NL	Central	5th	71	91	.438	25		
2012	2012	NL	Central	5th	61	101	.377	36		
2013	2013	NL	Central	5th	66	96	.407	31		
2014	2014	NL	Central	5th	73	89	.451	17		
2015	2015	NL	Central	3rd ¤	97	65	.599	3	Won NLWC (Pirates); Won NLDS (Cardinals) 3–1; Lost NLCS (Mets) 4–0	Jake Arrieta (CYA); Kris Bryant (ROY); Joe Maddon (MOY)
2016 †	2016	NL *	Central ^	1st	103	58	.640	—	Won NLDS (Giants) 3–1; Won NLCS (Dodgers) 4–2; Won World Series (Indians) 4–3 †	Kris Bryant (MVP); Ben Zobrist (WS MVP)
2017	2017	NL	Central ^	1st	92	70	.568	—	Won NLDS (Nationals) 3–2; Lost NLCS (Dodgers) 4–1	
2018	2018	NL	Central	2nd ¤	95	68	.583	1	Lost NLWC (Rockies)	
2019	2019	NL	Central	3rd	84	78	.519	7		
2020	2020	NL	Central ^	1st	34	26	.567	—	Lost NLWC (Marlins) 2–0	
2021	2021	NL	Central	4th	71	91	.438	24		
2022	2022	NL	Central	3rd	74	88	.457	19		
2023	2023	NL	Central	2nd	83	79	.512	9		
2024	2024	NL	Central	3rd	83	79	.512	10		
2025	2025	NL	Central	2nd ¤	92	70	.568	5	Won NLWC (Padres) 2–1; Lost NLDS (Brewers) 3–2	
2026	2026	NL	Central	2nd ¤	89	73	.549	14	Lost NLWC (Padres) 2–0	Pete Crow-Armstrong (MVP)

== Record by decade ==
The following table describes the Cubs' MLB win–loss record by decade.

Decade	Wins	Losses	Pct
1870s	253	194	.566
1880s	691	395	.636
1890s	711	654	.521
1900s	879	592	.598
1910s	826	668	.553
1920s	807	728	.526
1930s	889	646	.579
1940s	736	802	.479
1950s	672	866	.437
1960s	735	868	.459
1970s	785	827	.487
1980s	735	821	.472
1990s	739	813	.476
2000s	807	811	.499
2010s	817	803	.504
2020s	437	433	.502
All-time	11419	10837	.513

== Postseason record by year ==
The Cubs have reached the postseason twenty-three times in their history, with the first being in 1906 and the most recent being in 2026.

Postseason record by year
Year	Finish	Round	Opponent	Result		
1906	National League Champions	World Series	Chicago White Sox	Lost	2	4
1907	World Series Champions	World Series	Detroit Tigers	Won	4	0
1908	World Series Champions	World Series	Detroit Tigers	Won	4	1
1910	National League Champions	World Series	Philadelphia Athletics	Lost	1	4
1918	National League Champions	World Series	Boston Red Sox	Lost	2	4
1929	National League Champions	World Series	Philadelphia Athletics	Lost	1	4
1932	National League Champions	World Series	New York Yankees	Lost	0	4
1935	National League Champions	World Series	Detroit Tigers	Lost	2	4
1938	National League Champions	World Series	New York Yankees	Lost	0	4
1945	National League Champions	World Series	Detroit Tigers	Lost	3	4
1984	National League East Champions	NLCS	San Diego Padres	Lost	2	3
1989	National League East Champions	NLCS	San Francisco Giants	Lost	1	4
1998	National League Wild Card	NLDS	Atlanta Braves	Lost	0	3
2003	National League Central Champions	NLDS	Atlanta Braves	Won	3	2
2003	National League Central Champions	NLCS	Florida Marlins	Lost	3	4
2007	National League Central Champions	NLDS	Arizona Diamondbacks	Lost	0	3
2008	National League Central Champions	NLDS	Los Angeles Dodgers	Lost	0	3
2015	National League Wild Card	NLWC	Pittsburgh Pirates	Won	1	0
2015	National League Wild Card	NLDS	St Louis Cardinals	Won	3	1
2015	National League Wild Card	NLCS	New York Mets	Lost	0	4
2016	World Series Champions	NLDS	San Francisco Giants	Won	3	1
2016	World Series Champions	NLCS	Los Angeles Dodgers	Won	4	2
2016	World Series Champions	World Series	Cleveland Indians	Won	4	3
2017	National League Central Champions	NLDS	Washington Nationals	Won	3	2
2017	National League Central Champions	NLCS	Los Angeles Dodgers	Lost	1	4
2018	National League Wild Card	NLWC	Colorado Rockies	Lost	0	1
2020	National League Central Champions	NLWC	Miami Marlins	Lost	0	2
2025	National League Wild Card	NLWC	San Diego Padres	Won	2	1
2025	National League Wild Card	NLDS	Milwaukee Brewers	Lost	2	3
2026	National League Wild Card	NLWC	San Diego Padres	Lost	0	2
23	Totals			10-20	51	81

== All-time records ==
As of October 1, 2026

Totals	Wins	Losses	Ties	Per.
All-time regular season record	11,508	10,910	157	.513
All-time postseason record (Note: This does not include pre-modern World Series games (Champions from 1876 to 1904).)	51	81	—	.386
Wild Card Game/Series	3	6	—	.333
National League Division Series	14	18	—	.438
National League Championship Series	11	21	—	.344
World Series	23	36	—	.390
All-time regular and postseason record	11,559	10,991	157	.512
