= Dode Paskert =

American baseball player (1881–1959)

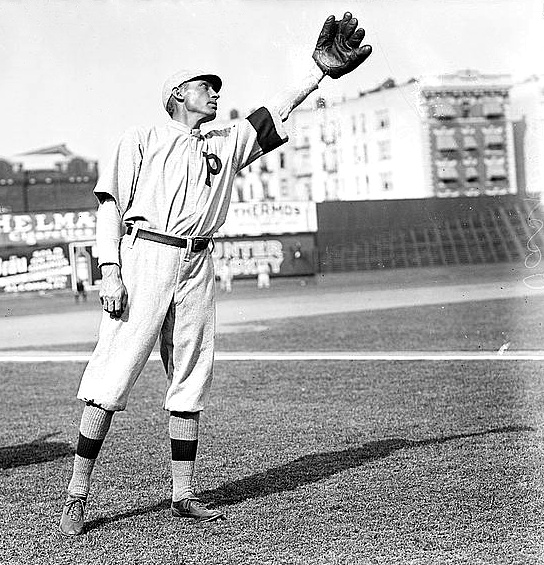
- Center fielder
- Born: August 28, 1881; Cleveland, Ohio, U.S.
- Died: February 12, 1959 (aged 77); Cleveland, Ohio, U.S.
- Batted: Right Threw: Right

MLB debut
- September 21, 1907, for the Cincinnati Reds

Last MLB appearance
- May 27, 1921, for the Cincinnati Reds

MLB statistics
- Batting average: .268
- Home runs: 42
- Runs batted in: 577
- Stats at Baseball Reference

Teams
- Cincinnati Reds (1907–1910); Philadelphia Phillies (1911–1917); Chicago Cubs (1918–1921); Cincinnati Reds (1921)

George Henry "Dode" Paskert (August 28, 1881 – February 12, 1959) was an American center fielder in Major League Baseball who played from 1907 through 1921 for the Cincinnati Reds, Philadelphia Phillies, and Chicago Cubs.

== Career ==
Born in Cleveland, Ohio, the speedy Dode Paskert was a defensive center fielder in the dead-ball era. He was also a pull hitter. Being used most often in the leadoff position, Paskert frequently hit for extra bases.

Paskert collected 51 stolen bases for the Reds in 1910, including stealing second base, third base, and home in the first inning of a 6–5 win over the Boston Bees.

His most productive season in 1912, when he hit a career-high .312 batting average along with a .420 on-base percentage and .413 slugging average, ranking among the top 10 in four offensive categories, and being considered in the National League MVP vote at the end of the season.

From 1912 to 1918 he ranked among the top ten in doubles four times and home runs once.

In between, the reliable Paskert batted third in the lineup in each game of the 1915 World Series for the Phillies against the Boston Red Sox, while batting clean-up for the Cubs in each game of the 1918 World Series, also against the Red Sox.

In a 15-season career, Paskert hit a .268/.350/.361 batting line, including 577 runs batted in, 868 runs scored, 1613 hits, 279 doubles, 77 triples, 42 home runs, and stole 293 bases in 1,716 games. Defensively, he recorded a .968 fielding percentage.

Afterwards, Paskert played in the minor leagues for the Kansas City Blues and Columbus Senators of the American Association and the Atlanta Crackers and Nashville Vols of the Southern Association, before retiring from baseball.

He was publicly credited with saving the lives of five small children on Feb. 23, 1921, when a fire broke out at the Union Clothing Co. on Lorain Avenue in Cleveland while he was passing by. According to news accounts, Paskert "made three trips into the burning building, carrying out five small children wrapped in rugs and his overcoat, and directed other members of three families to safety. His hands and arms were badly burned and his face blistered by the flames."

Paskert died in 1959 in Cleveland, Ohio, at the age of 77.
