= Fred Thomas (third baseman) =

American baseball player (1892–1986)

- Third baseman
- Born: December 19, 1892; Milwaukee, Wisconsin, US
- Died: January 15, 1986 (aged 93); Rice Lake, Wisconsin, US
- Batted: Right Threw: Right

MLB debut
- April 22, 1918, for the Boston Red Sox

Last MLB appearance
- August 9, 1920, for the Washington Senators

MLB statistics
- Batting average: .225
- Home runs: 4
- Runs batted in: 45
- Stats at Baseball Reference

Teams
- Boston Red Sox (1918); Philadelphia Athletics (1919–1920); Washington Senators (1920)

Career highlights and awards
- World Series champion (1918)

Frederick Harvey "Tommy" Thomas (December 19, 1892 – January 15, 1986) was an American professional baseball third baseman. He played in Major League Baseball (MLB) from 1918 to 1920 for the Boston Red Sox, Philadelphia Athletics, and Washington Senators.

In 1916, Thomas was acquired by the Boston Red Sox with Sam Jones from the Cleveland Indians in exchange for Tris Speaker. He entered the majors in 1918, hitting .257 in 44 games, and was a member of the World Champions Red Sox in the 1918 Series. Before the 1919 season, he was dealt to the Philadelphia Athletics and posted career-highs in games (124), hits (96), runs (42) and stolen bases (12), while hitting .212. He divided his playing time with the Athletics and Washington Senators in 1920, his last major league season.

In a three-year career, Thomas was a .225 hitter (193-for-859) with four home runs and 45 RBI in 247 games, including 88 runs, 19 doubles, 14 triples, and 24 stolen bases. He also hit .118 in six Series games (2-for-17).

Thomas died at the age of 93 in Rice Lake, Wisconsin. He was the last surviving member of the 1918 World Champion Boston Red Sox.

He has been credited for starting the tradition of standing during playing of the National Anthem at baseball games, at the 1918 Series.
