= Hack Miller =

American baseball player (1894–1971)

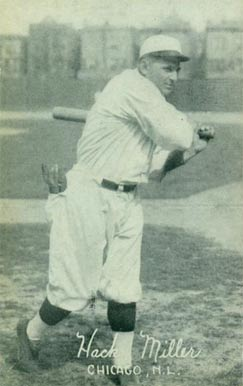
- Outfielder
- Born: January 1, 1894; New York City, U.S.
- Died: September 17, 1971 (aged 77); Oakland, California, U.S.
- Batted: Right Threw: Right

MLB debut
- September 22, 1916, for the Brooklyn Robins

Last MLB appearance
- May 21, 1925, for the Chicago Cubs

MLB statistics
- Batting average: .323
- Home runs: 38
- Runs batted in: 205
- Stats at Baseball Reference

Teams
- Brooklyn Robins (1916); Boston Red Sox (1918); Chicago Cubs (1922–1925)

Career highlights and awards
- World Series champion (1918)

Laurence H. "Hack" Miller (January 1, 1894 – September 17, 1971) was an American professional baseball outfielder, who played in Major League Baseball from 1916 to 1925.

Miller was born in New York City. He played for the Brooklyn Robins, Boston Red Sox, and Chicago Cubs. He appeared in one game in the 1918 World Series as a member of the champion Red Sox. The son of a wrestler and strongman, he wielded a 47-ounce bat and occasionally used a bat weighing 65 ounces. His nickname "Hack" was due to his resemblance to wrestler Georg Hackenschmidt.

On August 25, 1922, Miller hit two 3-run home runs to help the Cubs beat the Phillies 26–23 in the highest-scoring game in major league history.

After 25 years as a longshoreman, Miller died in Oakland, California.

In 349 games over 6 seasons, Miller hit .323 (387-for-1200), with 164 runs, 65 doubles, 11 triples, 38 home runs, 205 RBI, 64 walks, .361 on-base percentage, and .490 slugging percentage. Defensively, he recorded a .962 fielding percentage as an outfielder (almost exclusively in left field).
