= Bill McCabe (baseball) =

American baseball player (1892–1966)

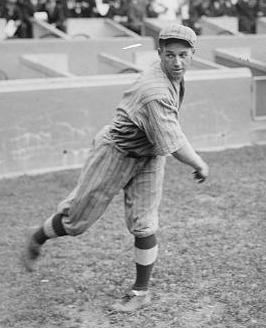
- Infielder / Outfielder
- Born: October 28, 1892; Chicago, Illinois, U.S.
- Died: September 2, 1966 (aged 73); Chicago, Illinois, U.S.
- Batted: Switch Threw: Right

MLB debut
- April 16, 1918, for the Chicago Cubs

Last MLB appearance
- October 3, 1920, for the Brooklyn Robins

MLB statistics
- Batting average: .161
- Home runs: 0
- Runs batted in: 13
- Stats at Baseball Reference

Teams
- Chicago Cubs (1918–1920); Brooklyn Robins (1920)

William Francis McCabe (October 28, 1892 – September 2, 1966) was an American professional baseball player who played in the Major Leagues from 1918 to 1920. He would play for the Chicago Cubs and Brooklyn Robins.

== Biography ==
He was born on October 28, 1892, in Chicago. McCabe appeared in three games of the 1918 World Series. As a pinch-runner in Game 4, he scored the tying run in an eighth-inning rally at Fenway Park against Boston pitcher Babe Ruth, but the Cubs lost the game 3–2 on a wild pitch in the bottom of the eighth. He died on September 2, 1966, in Chicago.

McCabe also made one appearance in the 1920 World Series. He pinch-ran with two outs in the ninth inning of Game 6, which Brooklyn was losing 1–0. Duster Mails retired the final batter for a Cleveland Indians victory.

During his career, McCabe batted 199 times and hit just .161, with five extra-base hits.
