= Atterson, Kentucky =

Atterson
- Unincorporated community
- Location within the state of Kentucky Atterson (the United States)
- Coordinates: 37°20′18″N 85°4′41″W
- Country: United States
- State: Kentucky
- County: Casey
- Elevation: 912 ft (278 m)

Population (2000)
  - Total: 0
- Time zone: UTC-6 (Central (CST))
  - Summer (DST): UTC-5 (CST)
- GNIS feature ID: 507426

Atterson was an unincorporated community in Casey County, Kentucky, United States. Its post office, along with the rest of the town, has ceased to exist.
