= List of Cincinnati Reds seasons =

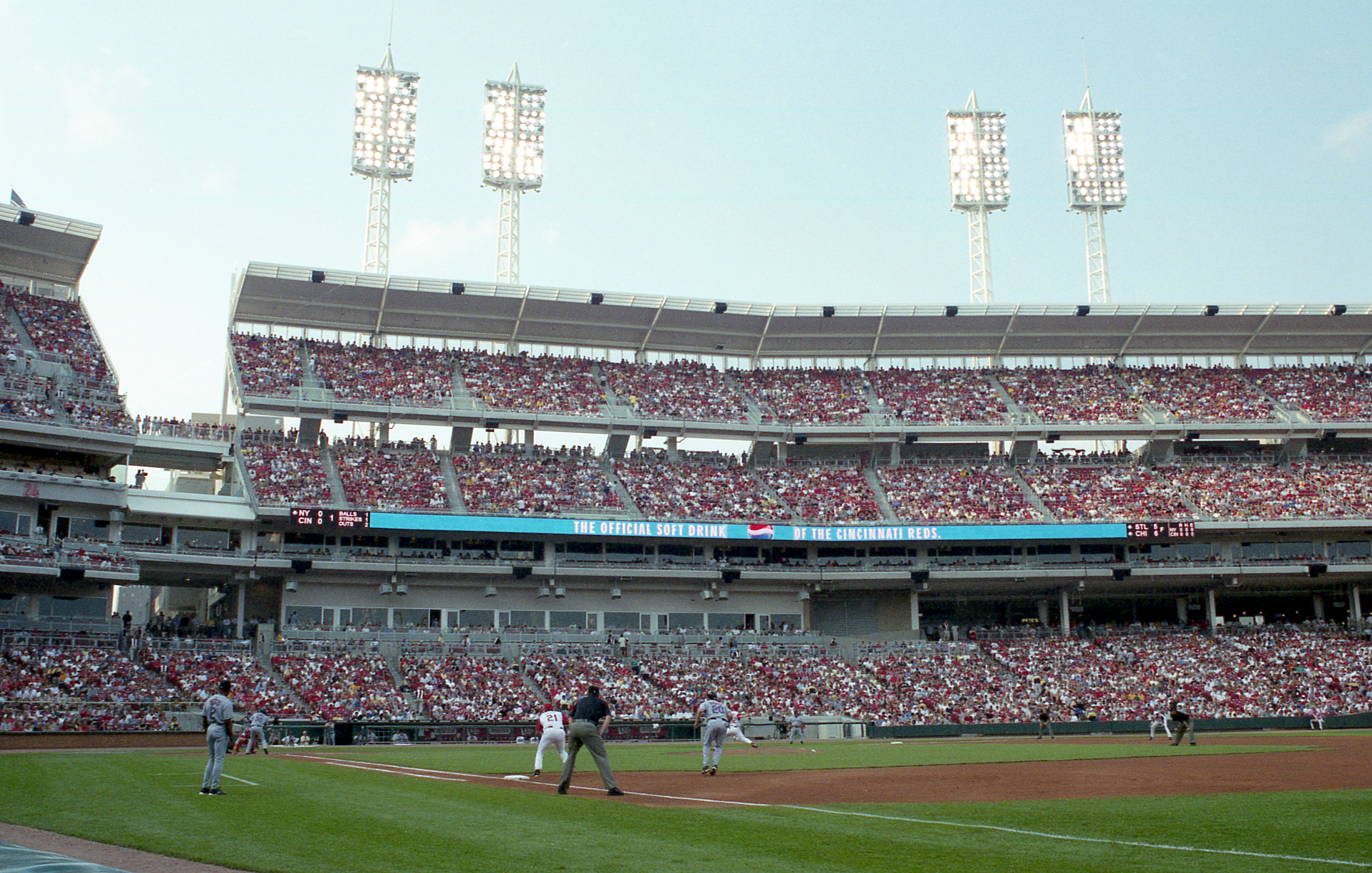
The Reds have played home games at Great American Ball Park since 2003.

The Cincinnati Reds are a professional baseball team based in Cincinnati. The Reds play in the Central Division of Major League Baseball's (MLB) National League (NL). In its 122 major league seasons, the franchise has won 5 World Series championships, tied for seventh most with the Pittsburgh Pirates. The Reds played their home games at Riverfront Stadium from 1970 to 2002 and at Crosley Field before that, from 1912 to 1970. In 2003, the team moved into Great American Ball Park, located on the banks of the Ohio River and built on the old site of Riverfront Stadium.

The history of baseball in Cincinnati dates back to 1869 when they were originally called the "Red Stockings" and were the first true professional baseball team in the United States. In 1876, the Cincinnati Red Stockings, a different organization, were one of the original 8 members of the National League and Major League Baseball. After 5 years of instability, that franchise folded when the National League voted to ban alcohol sales during games and ban Stadium use on Sundays. The modern Cincinnati Reds began play in 1882 as members of the American Association, which the Reds won in their first year of competition. The American Association and all of its history are recognized by Major League Baseball. The Reds joined the National League in 1890. Over their history, the Reds have won 10 National League Pennants and made it to the post season 13 times, along with their five World Series Championships.

Following the Cincinnati Reds second championship in 1940, the franchise only had one post-season appearance between 1941 and 1969. During the 1970s, however, the Reds would appear in the post-season six times during the decade, along with four National League pennants, and back-to-back World Series championships in 1975 and 1976. The Reds were nicknamed Big Red Machine during the time period and complied, what some have claimed to be, the best teams in major league baseball history. Following the 1976 championship and Big Red Machine era, the Reds struggled to sustain consistent post-season appearances.

The fifth and most recent championship for the Cincinnati Reds came in 1990, in which that team went wire-to-wire and swept the World Series. The Reds have made only six post-season appearances since 1991, with their most recent appearance coming in 2025, where they were swept in 2 games in the wild card series. The Cincinnati Reds have failed to advance in the post-season dating back to 1995, a span that is a current record for all North American professional sports. Overall, the Reds have compiled a winning percentage of .508 over their history and also achieved a franchise mark of 10,000 wins on April 20, 2012, becoming just the sixth major league franchise to accomplish the feat. The Reds lost their 10,000th game on August 28, 2015. They were the fourth major league baseball franchise to reach this number.

== Table key ==
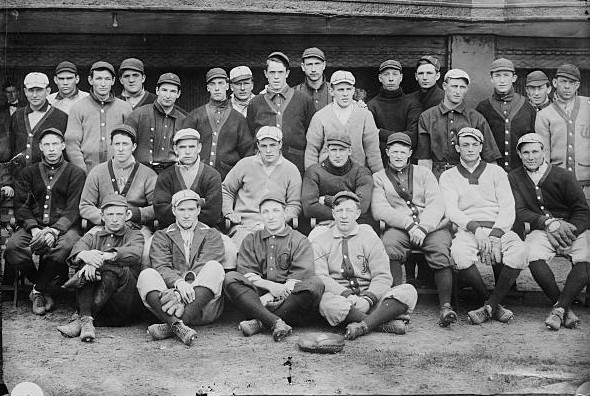
The 1909 Cincinnati Reds team.

| NLCS | National League Championship Series |
| NLDS | National League Division Series |
| ASGMVP | All-Star Game Most Valuable Player |
| CPOY | Comeback Player of the Year |
| CYA | Cy Young Award |
| Finish | Final position in league or division |
| GB | "Games Back" from first-place team^{[a]} |
| Losses | Number of regular season losses |
| MOY | Manager of the Year |
| MVP | Most Valuable Player |
| ROY | National League Rookie of the Year |
| Season | Each year is linked to an article about that particular MLB season |
| Team | Each year is linked to an article about that particular Reds season |
| Wins | Number of regular season wins |
| WSMVP | World Series Most Valuable Player |

== Seasons ==
| World Series champions (1903–present) † | National League champions (1901–present)^{[b]} * | Division champions (1969–present) ^ | Wild card berth (1994–present) ¤ | AA champions (1882–1891) ‡ |

| Season | Team | Level | League | Division | Finish | Wins | Losses | Win% | GB | Playoffs | Awards |
|---|---|---|---|---|---|---|---|---|---|---|---|
Cincinnati Red Stockings
| 1882 | 1882 | MLB | AA ‡ | – | 1st | 55 | 25 | .688 | — | | |
| 1883 | 1883 | MLB | AA | – | 3rd | 61 | 37 | .622 | 5 | | |
| 1884 | 1884 | MLB | AA | – | 5th | 68 | 41 | .624 | 8 | | |
| 1885 | 1885 | MLB | AA | – | 2nd | 63 | 49 | .563 | 16 | | |
| 1886 | 1886 | MLB | AA | – | 5th | 65 | 73 | .471 | 27½ | | |
| 1887 | 1887 | MLB | AA | – | 2nd | 81 | 54 | .600 | 14 | | |
| 1888 | 1888 | MLB | AA | – | 4th | 80 | 54 | .597 | 11½ | | |
| 1889 | 1889 | MLB | AA | – | 4th | 76 | 63 | .547 | 18 | | |
Cincinnati Reds
| 1890 | 1890 | MLB | NL | – | 4th | 77 | 55 | .583 | 10½ | | |
| 1891 | 1891 | MLB | NL | – | 7th | 56 | 81 | .409 | 30½ | | |
| 1892 | 1892 | MLB | NL | – | 5th | 82 | 68 | .547 | 8½ | | |
| 1893 | 1893 | MLB | NL | – | 6th | 65 | 63 | .508 | 20½ | | |
| 1894 | 1894 | MLB | NL | – | 10th | 55 | 75 | .423 | 35 | | |
| 1895 | 1895 | MLB | NL | – | 8th | 66 | 64 | .508 | 21 | | |
| 1896 | 1896 | MLB | NL | – | 3rd | 77 | 50 | .606 | 12 | | |
| 1897 | 1897 | MLB | NL | – | 4th | 76 | 56 | .576 | 17 | | |
| 1898 | 1898 | MLB | NL | – | 3rd | 92 | 60 | .605 | 11½ | | |
| 1899 | 1899 | MLB | NL | – | 6th | 83 | 67 | .553 | 19 | | |
| 1900 | 1900 | MLB | NL | – | 7th | 62 | 77 | .446 | 21½ | | |
| 1901 | 1901 | MLB | NL | – | 8th | 52 | 87 | .374 | 37 | | |
| 1902 | 1902 | MLB | NL | – | 4th | 70 | 70 | .500 | 33½ | | |
| 1903 | 1903 | MLB | NL | – | 4th | 74 | 65 | .532 | 16½ | | |
| 1904 | 1904 | MLB | NL | – | 3rd | 88 | 65 | .575 | 18 | | |
| 1905 | 1905 | MLB | NL | – | 5th | 79 | 74 | .516 | 26 | | |
| 1906 | 1906 | MLB | NL | – | 6th | 64 | 87 | .424 | 51½ | | |
| 1907 | 1907 | MLB | NL | – | 6th | 66 | 87 | .431 | 41½ | | |
| 1908 | 1908 | MLB | NL | – | 5th | 73 | 81 | .474 | 26 | | |
| 1909 | 1909 | MLB | NL | – | 4th | 77 | 76 | .503 | 33½ | | |
| 1910 | 1910 | MLB | NL | – | 5th | 75 | 79 | .487 | 29 | | |
| 1911 | 1911 | MLB | NL | – | 6th | 70 | 83 | .458 | 29 | | |
| 1912 | 1912 | MLB | NL | – | 4th | 75 | 78 | .490 | 29 | | |
| 1913 | 1913 | MLB | NL | – | 7th | 64 | 89 | .418 | 37½ | | |
| 1914 | 1914 | MLB | NL | – | 8th | 60 | 94 | .390 | 34½ | | |
| 1915 | 1915 | MLB | NL | – | 7th | 71 | 83 | .461 | 20 | | |
| 1916 | 1916 | MLB | NL | – | 7th | 60 | 93 | .392 | 33½ | | |
| 1917 | 1917 | MLB | NL | – | 4th | 78 | 76 | .506 | 20 | | |
| 1918 | 1918 | MLB | NL | – | 3rd | 68 | 60 | .531 | 15½ | | |
| 1919 | 1919 | MLB † | NL * | – | 1st | 96 | 44 | .686 | — | Won World Series (White Sox) 5–3 † | |
| 1920 | 1920 | MLB | NL | – | 3rd | 82 | 71 | .536 | 10½ | | |
| 1921 | 1921 | MLB | NL | – | 6th | 70 | 83 | .458 | 24 | | |
| 1922 | 1922 | MLB | NL | – | 2nd | 86 | 68 | .558 | 7 | | |
| 1923 | 1923 | MLB | NL | – | 2nd | 91 | 63 | .591 | 4½ | | |
| 1924 | 1924 | MLB | NL | – | 4th | 83 | 70 | .542 | 10 | | |
| 1925 | 1925 | MLB | NL | – | 3rd | 80 | 73 | .523 | 15 | | |
| 1926 | 1926 | MLB | NL | – | 2nd | 87 | 67 | .565 | 2 | | |
| 1927 | 1927 | MLB | NL | – | 5th | 75 | 78 | .490 | 18½ | | |
| 1928 | 1928 | MLB | NL | – | 5th | 78 | 74 | .513 | 16 | | |
| 1929 | 1929 | MLB | NL | – | 7th | 66 | 88 | .429 | 33 | | |
| 1930 | 1930 | MLB | NL | – | 7th | 59 | 95 | .383 | 33 | | |
| 1931 | 1931 | MLB | NL | – | 8th | 58 | 96 | .377 | 43 | | |
| 1932 | 1932 | MLB | NL | – | 8th | 60 | 94 | .390 | 30 | | |
| 1933 | 1933 | MLB | NL | – | 8th | 58 | 94 | .382 | 33 | | |
| 1934 | 1934 | MLB | NL | – | 8th | 52 | 99 | .344 | 42 | | |
| 1935 | 1935 | MLB | NL | – | 6th | 68 | 85 | .444 | 31½ | | |
| 1936 | 1936 | MLB | NL | – | 5th | 74 | 80 | .481 | 18 | | |
| 1937 | 1937 | MLB | NL | – | 8th | 56 | 98 | .364 | 40 | | |
| 1938 | 1938 | MLB | NL | – | 4th | 82 | 68 | .547 | 6 | | Ernie Lombardi (MVP) |
| 1939 | 1939 | MLB | NL * | – | 1st | 97 | 57 | .630 | — | Lost World Series (Yankees) 4–0 * | Bucky Walters (MVP) |
| 1940 | 1940 | MLB † | NL * | – | 1st | 100 | 53 | .654 | — | Won World Series (Tigers) 4–3 † | Frank McCormick (MVP) |
| 1941 | 1941 | MLB | NL | – | 3rd | 88 | 66 | .571 | 12 | | |
| 1942 | 1942 | MLB | NL | – | 4th | 76 | 76 | .500 | 29 | | |
| 1943 | 1943 | MLB | NL | – | 2nd | 87 | 67 | .565 | 18 | | |
| 1944 | 1944 | MLB | NL | – | 3rd | 89 | 65 | .578 | 16 | | |
| 1945 | 1945 | MLB | NL | – | 7th | 61 | 93 | .396 | 37 | | |
| 1946 | 1946 | MLB | NL | – | 6th | 67 | 87 | .435 | 30 | | |
| 1947 | 1947 | MLB | NL | – | 5th | 73 | 81 | .474 | 21 | | |
| 1948 | 1948 | MLB | NL | – | 7th | 64 | 89 | .418 | 27 | | |
| 1949 | 1949 | MLB | NL | – | 7th | 62 | 92 | .403 | 35 | | |
| 1950 | 1950 | MLB | NL | – | 6th | 66 | 87 | .431 | 24½ | | |
| 1951 | 1951 | MLB | NL | – | 6th | 68 | 86 | .442 | 28½ | | |
| 1952 | 1952 | MLB | NL | – | 6th | 69 | 85 | .448 | 27½ | | |
Cincinnati Redlegs
| 1953 | 1953 | MLB | NL | – | 6th | 68 | 86 | .442 | 37 | | |
| 1954 | 1954 | MLB | NL | – | 5th | 74 | 80 | .481 | 23 | | |
| 1955 | 1955 | MLB | NL | – | 5th | 75 | 79 | .487 | 23½ | | |
| 1956 | 1956 | MLB | NL | – | 3rd | 91 | 63 | .591 | 2 | | Frank Robinson (ROY) |
| 1957 | 1957 | MLB | NL | – | 4th | 80 | 74 | .519 | 15 | | |
| 1958 | 1958 | MLB | NL | – | 4th | 76 | 78 | .494 | 16 | | |
Cincinnati Reds
| 1959 | 1959 | MLB | NL | – | 5th | 74 | 80 | .481 | 13 | | |
| 1960 | 1960 | MLB | NL | – | 6th | 67 | 87 | .435 | 28 | | |
| 1961 | 1961 | MLB | NL * | – | 1st | 93 | 61 | .604 | — | Lost World Series (Yankees) 4–1 * | Frank Robinson (MVP) |
| 1962 | 1962 | MLB | NL | – | 3rd | 98 | 64 | .605 | 3½ | | |
| 1963 | 1963 | MLB | NL | – | 5th | 86 | 76 | .531 | 13 | | Pete Rose (ROY) |
| 1964 | 1964 | MLB | NL | – | 2nd | 92 | 70 | .568 | 1 | | |
| 1965 | 1965 | MLB | NL | – | 4th | 89 | 73 | .549 | 8 | | |
| 1966 | 1966 | MLB | NL | – | 7th | 76 | 84 | .475 | 18 | | Tommy Helms (ROY) |
| 1967 | 1967 | MLB | NL | – | 4th | 87 | 75 | .537 | 14½ | | |
| 1968 | 1968 | MLB | NL | – | 4th | 83 | 79 | .512 | 14 | | Johnny Bench (ROY) |
| 1969 | 1969 | MLB | NL | West^{[d]} | 3rd | 89 | 73 | .549 | 4 | | |
| 1970 | 1970 | MLB | NL * | West ^ | 1st | 102 | 60 | .630 | — | Won NLCS (Pirates) 3–0; Lost World Series (Orioles) 4–1 * | Johnny Bench (MVP) |
| 1971 | 1971 | MLB | NL | West | 4th | 79 | 83 | .488 | 11 | | |
| 1972^{[e]} | 1972 | MLB | NL * | West ^ | 1st | 95 | 59 | .617 | — | Won NLCS (Pirates) 3–2; Lost World Series (Athletics) 4–3 * | Johnny Bench (MVP) |
| 1973 | 1973 | MLB | NL | West ^ | 1st | 99 | 63 | .611 | — | Lost NLCS (Mets) 3–2 | Pete Rose (MVP) |
| 1974 | 1974 | MLB | NL | West | 2nd | 98 | 64 | .605 | 4 | | |
| 1975 | 1975 | MLB † | NL * | West ^ | 1st | 108 | 54 | .667 | — | Won NLCS (Pirates) 3–0; Won World Series (Red Sox) 4–3 † | Joe Morgan (MVP); Pete Rose (WS MVP) |
| 1976 | 1976 | MLB † | NL * | West ^ | 1st | 102 | 60 | .630 | — | Won NLCS (Phillies) 3–0; Won World Series (Yankees) 4–0 † | Joe Morgan (MVP); Pat Zachry (ROY); Johnny Bench (WS MVP) |
| 1977 | 1977 | MLB | NL | West | 2nd | 88 | 74 | .543 | 10 | | George Foster (MVP) |
| 1978 | 1978 | MLB | NL | West | 2nd | 92 | 69 | .571 | 2½ | | |
| 1979 | 1979 | MLB | NL | West ^ | 1st | 90 | 71 | .559 | — | Lost NLCS (Pirates) 3–0 | |
| 1980 | 1980 | MLB | NL | West | 3rd | 89 | 73 | .549 | 3½ | | |
| 1981^{[f]} | 1981 | MLB | NL | West | 2nd | 35 | 21 | .625 | ½ | | |
| 1981^{[f]} | 1981 | MLB | NL | West | 2nd | 31 | 21 | .596 | 1½ | | |
| 1982 | 1982 | MLB | NL | West | 6th | 61 | 101 | .377 | 28 | | |
| 1983 | 1983 | MLB | NL | West | 6th | 74 | 88 | .457 | 17 | | |
| 1984 | 1984 | MLB | NL | West | 5th | 70 | 92 | .432 | 22 | | |
| 1985 | 1985 | MLB | NL | West | 2nd | 89 | 72 | .553 | 5½ | | |
| 1986 | 1986 | MLB | NL | West | 2nd | 86 | 76 | .531 | 10 | | |
| 1987 | 1987 | MLB | NL | West | 2nd | 84 | 78 | .519 | 6 | | |
| 1988 | 1988 | MLB | NL | West | 2nd | 87 | 74 | .540 | 7 | | Chris Sabo (ROY) |
| 1989 | 1989 | MLB | NL | West | 5th | 75 | 87 | .463 | 17 | | |
| 1990 | 1990 | MLB † | NL * | West ^ | 1st | 91 | 71 | .562 | — | Won NLCS (Pirates) 4–2; Won World Series (Athletics) 4–0 † | José Rijo (WS MVP) |
| 1991 | 1991 | MLB | NL | West | 5th | 74 | 88 | .457 | 20 | | |
| 1992 | 1992 | MLB | NL | West | 2nd | 90 | 72 | .556 | 8 | | |
| 1993 | 1993 | MLB | NL | West | 5th | 73 | 89 | .451 | 31 | | |
| 1994^{[g]} | 1994 | MLB | NL | Central^{[h]} | 1st | 66 | 48 | .579 | — | Playoffs cancelled | |
| 1995 | 1995 | MLB | NL | Central ^ | 1st | 85 | 59 | .590 | — | Won NLDS (Dodgers) 3–0; Lost NLCS (Braves) 4–0 | Barry Larkin (MVP) |
| 1996 | 1996 | MLB | NL | Central | 3rd | 81 | 81 | .500 | 7 | | |
| 1997 | 1997 | MLB | NL | Central | 3rd | 76 | 86 | .469 | 8 | | |
| 1998 | 1998 | MLB | NL | Central | 4th | 77 | 85 | .475 | 25 | | |
| 1999^{[i]} | 1999 | MLB | NL | Central | 2nd | 96 | 67 | .589 | 1½ | | Scott Williamson (ROY); Jack McKeon (MOY) |
| 2000 | 2000 | MLB | NL | Central | 2nd | 85 | 77 | .525 | 10 | | |
| 2001 | 2001 | MLB | NL | Central | 5th | 66 | 96 | .407 | 27 | | |
| 2002 | 2002 | MLB | NL | Central | 3rd | 78 | 84 | .481 | 19 | | |
| 2003 | 2003 | MLB | NL | Central | 5th | 69 | 93 | .426 | 19 | | |
| 2004 | 2004 | MLB | NL | Central | 4th | 76 | 86 | .469 | 29 | | |
| 2005 | 2005 | MLB | NL | Central | 5th | 73 | 89 | .451 | 27 | | |
| 2006 | 2006 | MLB | NL | Central | 3rd | 80 | 82 | .494 | 3½ | | |
| 2007 | 2007 | MLB | NL | Central | 5th | 72 | 90 | .444 | 13 | | |
| 2008 | 2008 | MLB | NL | Central | 5th | 74 | 88 | .457 | 23½ | | |
| 2009 | 2009 | MLB | NL | Central | 4th | 78 | 84 | .481 | 13 | | |
| 2010 | 2010 | MLB | NL | Central ^ | 1st | 91 | 71 | .562 | — | Lost NLDS (Phillies) 3–0 | Joey Votto (MVP) |
| 2011 | 2011 | MLB | NL | Central | 3rd | 79 | 83 | .488 | 17 | | |
| 2012 | 2012 | MLB | NL | Central ^ | 1st | 97 | 65 | .599 | — | Lost NLDS (Giants) 3–2 | |
| 2013 | 2013 | MLB | NL | Central | 3rd ¤ | 90 | 72 | .556 | 7 | Lost NLWC (Pirates) | |
| 2014 | 2014 | MLB | NL | Central | 4th | 76 | 86 | .469 | 14 | | |
| 2015 | 2015 | MLB | NL | Central | 5th | 64 | 98 | .395 | 36 | | |
| 2016 | 2016 | MLB | NL | Central | 5th | 68 | 94 | .420 | 35½ | | |
| 2017 | 2017 | MLB | NL | Central | 5th | 68 | 94 | .420 | 24 | | |
| 2018 | 2018 | MLB | NL | Central | 5th | 67 | 95 | .414 | 28½ | | |
| 2019 | 2019 | MLB | NL | Central | 4th | 75 | 87 | .463 | 16 | | |
| 2020 | 2020 | MLB | NL | Central | 3rd ¤ | 31 | 29 | .517 | 3 | Lost NLWC (Braves) 2–0 | Trevor Bauer (CYA) |
| 2021 | 2021 | MLB | NL | Central | 3rd | 83 | 79 | .512 | 12 | | Jonathan India (ROY) |
| 2022 | 2022 | MLB | NL | Central | T-4th | 62 | 100 | .383 | 31 | | |
| 2023 | 2023 | MLB | NL | Central | 3rd | 82 | 80 | .506 | 10 | | |
| 2024 | 2024 | MLB | NL | Central | 4th | 77 | 85 | .475 | 16 | | |
| 2025^{[j]} | 2025 | MLB | NL | Central | 3rd ¤ | 83 | 79 | .512 | 14 | Lost NLWC (Dodgers) 2–0 | |
| 2026 | 2026 | MLB | NL | Central | 5th | 75 | 87 | .463 | 28 | | Sal Stewart (ROY) |
| Totals | | | | | | Wins | Losses | Win% | | | |
| Totals | | | | | | 11,092 | 10,932 | .504 | All-time regular season record (1882–2026) | | |
| Totals | | | | | | 49 | 50 | .495 | All-time postseason record | | |
| Totals | | | | | | 11,141 | 10,982 | .504 | All-time regular and postseason record | | |

== Record by decade ==
The following table describes the Reds' MLB win–loss record by decade.

| Decade | Wins | Losses | Pct |
|---|---|---|---|
| 1880s | 549 | 396 | .581 |
| 1890s | 729 | 639 | .533 |
| 1900s | 705 | 769 | .478 |
| 1910s | 717 | 779 | .479 |
| 1920s | 798 | 735 | .521 |
| 1930s | 664 | 866 | .432 |
| 1940s | 767 | 769 | .499 |
| 1950s | 741 | 798 | .481 |
| 1960s | 860 | 742 | .537 |
| 1970s | 953 | 657 | .592 |
| 1980s | 781 | 783 | .499 |
| 1990s | 809 | 746 | .520 |
| 2000s | 751 | 869 | .464 |
| 2010s | 775 | 845 | .478 |
| 2020s | 493 | 539 | .478 |
| All-time | 11,092 | 10,932 | .504 |

These statistics are from Baseball-Reference.com's Cincinnati Reds History & Encyclopedia, and are current as of the 2026 season.

== Postseason record by year ==
The Reds have made the postseason seventeen times in their history, with their first being in 1919 and the most recent being in 2025.

| Year | Finish | Round | Opponent | Result | | |
|---|---|---|---|---|---|---|
| 1919 | World Series Champions | World Series | Chicago White Sox | Won | 5 | 3 |
| 1939 | National League Champions | World Series | New York Yankees | Lost | 0 | 4 |
| 1940 | World Series Champions | World Series | Detroit Tigers | Won | 4 | 3 |
| 1961 | National League Champions | World Series | New York Yankees | Lost | 1 | 4 |
| 1970 | National League Champions | NLCS | Pittsburgh Pirates | Won | 3 | 0 |
| 1970 | National League Champions | World Series | Baltimore Orioles | Lost | 1 | 4 |
| 1972 | National League Champions | NLCS | Pittsburgh Pirates | Won | 3 | 2 |
| 1972 | National League Champions | World Series | Oakland Athletics | Lost | 3 | 4 |
| 1973 | National League West Champions | NLCS | New York Mets | Lost | 2 | 3 |
| 1975 | World Series Champions | NLCS | Pittsburgh Pirates | Won | 3 | 0 |
| 1975 | World Series Champions | World Series | Boston Red Sox | Won | 4 | 3 |
| 1976 | World Series Champions | NLCS | Philadelphia Phillies | Won | 3 | 0 |
| 1976 | World Series Champions | World Series | New York Yankees | Won | 4 | 0 |
| 1979 | National League West Champions | NLCS | Pittsburgh Pirates | Lost | 0 | 3 |
| 1990 | World Series Champions | NLCS | Pittsburgh Pirates | Won | 4 | 2 |
| 1990 | World Series Champions | World Series | Oakland Athletics | Won | 4 | 0 |
| 1995 | National League Central Champions | NLDS | Los Angeles Dodgers | Won | 3 | 0 |
| 1995 | National League Central Champions | NLCS | Atlanta Braves | Lost | 0 | 4 |
| 2010 | National League Central Champions | NLDS | Philadelphia Phillies | Lost | 0 | 3 |
| 2012 | National League Central Champions | NLDS | San Francisco Giants | Lost | 2 | 3 |
| 2013 | National League Wild Card | Wild Card Game | Pittsburgh Pirates | Lost | 0 | 1 |
| 2020 | National League Wild Card | Wild Card Series | Atlanta Braves | Lost | 0 | 2 |
| 2025 | National League Wild Card | Wild Card Series | Los Angeles Dodgers | Lost | 0 | 2 |
| 17 | Totals | | | 11–11 | 49 | 50 |

== Notes ==
- ^{a} This is determined by calculating the difference in wins plus the difference in losses divided by two.
- ^{b} For lists of all National League pennant winners, see National League pennant winners 1901–68 and National League Championship Series.
- ^{c} Half-game increments are possible because games can be cancelled due to rain. If a postponed game is the last of the season between two teams in one of their stadiums, it may not be made up if it does not affect the playoff race.
- ^{d} In 1969, the National League split into East and West divisions.
- ^{e} The 1972 Major League Baseball strike forced the cancellation of the Reds' first eight games of the season.
- ^{f} The 1981 Major League Baseball strike caused the season to be split into two halves. The Reds finished with the overall best record in major league baseball, but finished second in both halves of the season and was ineligible for a post-season appearance.
- ^{g} In 1994, a players' strike wiped out the last eight weeks of the season and all post-season. Cincinnati was in first place in the Central Division by a half game over Houston when play was stopped. No official titles were awarded in 1994.
- ^{h} In 1994, the National League split into East, West and Central divisions.
- ^{i} In 1999, the Reds finished the regular season tied with the New York Mets for the Wild Card, but lost a one-game playoff.
- ^{j} In 2025, the Reds finished tied with the New York Mets for the third Wild Card. The Cincinnati Reds won the third Wild Card over the New York Mets by virtue of winning the season series 4–2, while the New York Mets failed to qualify for the postseason.
