= 1918 World Series =

1918 Major League Baseball championship series

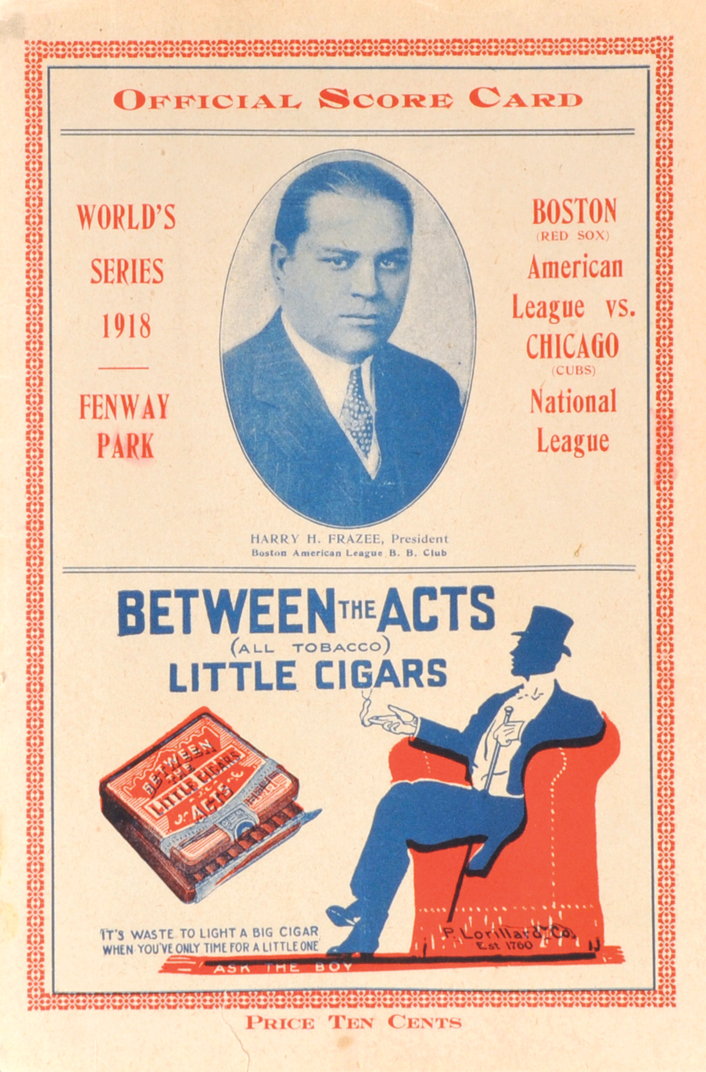
| Team (Wins) | Managers | Season |
|---|---|---|
| Boston Red Sox (4) | Ed Barrow | 75–51, .595, GA: 2 1/2 |
| Chicago Cubs (2) | Fred Mitchell | 84–45, .651, GA: 10 1/2 |
- Dates: September 5–11
- Venue(s): Fenway Park (Boston); Comiskey Park (Chicago)
- Umpires: Hank O'Day (NL), George Hildebrand (AL); Bill Klem (NL), Brick Owens (AL) (Note: For the first time in a World Series, all four umpires worked in the infield on a rotating basis. In previous World Series from 1909 through 1917, two of the four umpires had been positioned in the outfield for each game, in addition to the standard plate umpire and base umpire.)
- Hall of Famers: Umpires: Bill Klem; Hank O'Day; Boston Red Sox: Harry Hooper; Babe Ruth; Cubs: Grover Cleveland Alexander (DNP)

The 1918 World Series was the championship series in Major League Baseball for the 1918 season. The 15th edition of the World Series, it matched the American League (AL) champion Boston Red Sox against the National League (NL) champion Chicago Cubs. The Red Sox beat the Cubs four games to two. The Series victory for the Red Sox was their fifth in five tries, going back to 1903. The Red Sox scored only nine runs in the entire Series, the fewest runs by the winning team in World Series history. Along with the 1905, 1906 and 1907 World Series (the latter two of which the Cubs also played in), the 1918 World Series is one of only four Fall Classics where neither team hit a home run.

The 1918 Series was played under several metaphorical dark clouds. The Series was held early in September because of the World War I "Work or Fight" order that forced the premature end of the regular season on September 2, and remains the only World Series to be played entirely in September. The Series was marred by players threatening to strike due to low gate receipts.

The Chicago home games in the series were played at Comiskey Park, which had a greater seating capacity than Weeghman Park, the prior home of the Federal League Chicago Whales that the Cubs were then using and which would be rechristened Wrigley Field in 1925. The Red Sox had played their home games in the 1915 and 1916 World Series in the more expansive Braves Field, but they returned to Fenway Park for the 1918 series.

During the seventh-inning stretch of Game 1, the band began playing "The Star-Spangled Banner" because the country was involved in World War I. The song would be named the national anthem of the United States in 1931, and during World War II its playing would become a regular pre-game feature of baseball games and other sporting events. The winning pitcher of Game 1 was Babe Ruth, who pitched a shutout.

Although the Red Sox had just won their record-setting fifth World Series title, the 1918 championship would be the last Red Sox win until 2004. The drought of 86 years was often attributed to the Curse of the Bambino. The alleged curse came to be when Red Sox owner Harry Frazee traded the superbly talented but troublesome Babe Ruth (who was instrumental in their 1918 victory) to the New York Yankees for cash after the 1919 season.

The Cubs would not win their next World Series until 2016. The Cubs, who last won in 1908, won the National League but lost the Series in 1910, 1918, 1929, 1932, 1935, 1938, and 1945, allegedly stymied by the infamous Curse of the Billy Goat imposed during that latter Series. The Red Sox, who had won the American League but lost the Series in 1946, 1967, 1975, and 1986, finally won the World Series in 2004 and then won again in 2007, 2013 and 2018. When the Red Sox won in 2018, they became the first team to win the Fall Classic exactly one century apart.

After Game 6, it would be some 87 years until the Cubs and Red Sox would play again. A three-game interleague match-up at Wrigley Field began June 10, 2005, and was Boston's first visit to the park. The Cubs would not return to Fenway Park for nearly 94 years until a three-game interleague match-up beginning May 20, 2011.

To date, Red Sox manager Ed Barrow is the only manager to win a World Series without previously playing in organized baseball, whether in the minors or majors.

== Summary ==
AL Boston Red Sox (4) vs. NL Chicago Cubs (2)

| Game | Date | Score | Location | Time | Attendance |
|---|---|---|---|---|---|
| 1 | September 5 | Boston Red Sox – 1, Chicago Cubs – 0 | Comiskey Park | 1:50 | 19,274 |
| 2 | September 6 | Boston Red Sox – 1, Chicago Cubs – 3 | Comiskey Park | 1:58 | 20,040 |
| 3 | September 7 | Boston Red Sox – 2, Chicago Cubs – 1 | Comiskey Park | 1:57 | 27,054 |
| 4 | September 9 | Chicago Cubs – 2, Boston Red Sox – 3 | Fenway Park | 1:50 | 22,183 |
| 5 | September 10 | Chicago Cubs – 3, Boston Red Sox – 0 | Fenway Park | 1:42 | 24,694 |
| 6 | September 11 | Chicago Cubs – 1, Boston Red Sox – 2 | Fenway Park | 1:46 | 15,238 |

== Matchups ==
=== Game 1 ===
Thursday, September 5, 1918 2:30 pm (CT) at Comiskey Park in Chicago, Illinois
| Team | 1 | 2 | 3 | 4 | 5 | 6 | 7 | 8 | 9 | R | H | E |
|---|---|---|---|---|---|---|---|---|---|---|---|---|
| Boston | 0 | 0 | 0 | 1 | 0 | 0 | 0 | 0 | 0 | 1 | 5 | 0 |
| Chicago | 0 | 0 | 0 | 0 | 0 | 0 | 0 | 0 | 0 | 0 | 6 | 0 |
WP: Babe Ruth (1–0) LP: Hippo Vaughn (0–1)

Game 1 went to the Red Sox, 1–0, with Babe Ruth pitching the shutout before 19,274 fans. Stuffy McInnis knocked in the game's only run, driving in Dave Shean with a fourth-inning single off Hippo Vaughn. During the seventh-inning stretch, the U.S. Navy band began to play "The Star-Spangled Banner", Red Sox infielder Fred Thomas—who was in the Navy and had been granted furlough to play in the World Series—immediately turned toward the American flag and gave it a military salute, according to the Chicago Tribune. Other players turned to the flag with hands over hearts, and the already-standing crowd began to sing. At the song's conclusion, the previously quiet fans erupted in thunderous applause. At the time, The New York Times reported that it "marked the highest point of the day's enthusiasm." The song would be played at each of the Series' remaining games, to increasingly rapturous response. Other baseball parks began to play the song on holidays and special occasions, and Red Sox owner Harry Frazee made it a regular part of Boston home games. "The Star-Spangled Banner" officially became the U.S. national anthem in 1931, and by the end of World War II, NFL Commissioner Elmer Layden ordered that it be played at every football game. The tradition quickly spread to other sports, aided by the introduction of large sound systems and post-war patriotism.

=== Game 2 ===
Friday, September 6, 1918 2:30 pm (CT) at Comiskey Park in Chicago, Illinois
| Team | 1 | 2 | 3 | 4 | 5 | 6 | 7 | 8 | 9 | R | H | E |
|---|---|---|---|---|---|---|---|---|---|---|---|---|
| Boston | 0 | 0 | 0 | 0 | 0 | 0 | 0 | 0 | 1 | 1 | 6 | 1 |
| Chicago | 0 | 3 | 0 | 0 | 0 | 0 | 0 | 0 | X | 3 | 7 | 1 |
WP: Lefty Tyler (1–0) LP: Bullet Joe Bush (0–1)

The Cubs rebounded to tie the Series with a 3–1 victory in Game 2 the next day, behind Lefty Tyler's six-hit pitching. Tyler himself hit a two-run single in the second inning to make it 3–0 and carried a shutout into the ninth inning, when the Red Sox scored their only run.

=== Game 3 ===
Saturday, September 7, 1918 2:30 pm (CT) at Comiskey Park in Chicago, Illinois
| Team | 1 | 2 | 3 | 4 | 5 | 6 | 7 | 8 | 9 | R | H | E |
|---|---|---|---|---|---|---|---|---|---|---|---|---|
| Boston | 0 | 0 | 0 | 2 | 0 | 0 | 0 | 0 | 0 | 2 | 7 | 0 |
| Chicago | 0 | 0 | 0 | 0 | 1 | 0 | 0 | 0 | 0 | 1 | 7 | 1 |
WP: Carl Mays (1–0) LP: Hippo Vaughn (0–2)

The series remained in Chicago for Game 3 due to wartime restrictions on travel. The Red Sox won 2–1 to take a 2–1 series lead as Carl Mays scattered seven hits. Wally Schang and Everett Scott's back-to-back RBI singles in the fourth inning were all Boston needed for the win. Vaughn lost his second game of the Series, which ended when Cub baserunner Charlie Pick was caught in a rundown between third and home while trying to score on a passed ball.

=== Game 4 ===
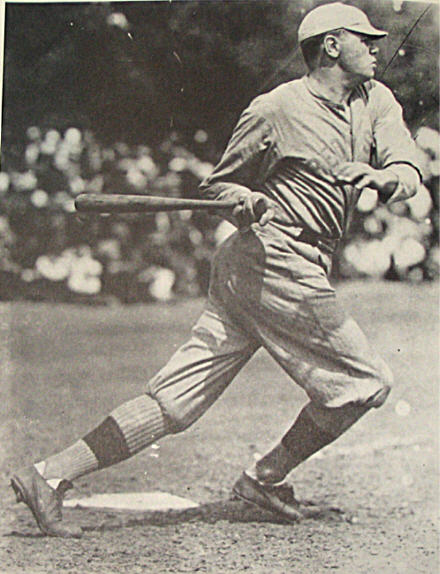
Babe Ruth in 1918

Monday, September 9, 1918 2:30 pm (ET) at Fenway Park in Boston, Massachusetts
| Team | 1 | 2 | 3 | 4 | 5 | 6 | 7 | 8 | 9 | R | H | E |
|---|---|---|---|---|---|---|---|---|---|---|---|---|
| Chicago | 0 | 0 | 0 | 0 | 0 | 0 | 0 | 2 | 0 | 2 | 7 | 1 |
| Boston | 0 | 0 | 0 | 2 | 0 | 0 | 0 | 1 | X | 3 | 4 | 0 |
WP: Babe Ruth (2–0) LP: Phil Douglas (0–1) Sv: Bullet Joe Bush (1)

Sunday the 8th was a travel day. The teams didn't arrive in Boston until the next day, shortly before the start of Game 4 that same day. The Cubs tied it in the eighth, ending Ruth's World Series scoreless inning streak on hits by Charlie Hollocher and Les Mann; but the Red Sox won it in the home half of the inning on a passed ball by Killefer and a wild throw by relief pitcher Phil Douglas, scoring Schang for a 3–2 victory and a 3–1 series lead.

Starting pitcher Babe Ruth batted sixth for the Red Sox in Game 4. He remained the last starting pitcher in World Series history to bat other than ninth in the batting order until Zack Greinke batted eighth for the Houston Astros in Game 4 of the 2021 World Series.

=== Game 5 ===
Tuesday, September 10, 1918 2:30 pm (ET) at Fenway Park in Boston, Massachusetts
| Team | 1 | 2 | 3 | 4 | 5 | 6 | 7 | 8 | 9 | R | H | E |
|---|---|---|---|---|---|---|---|---|---|---|---|---|
| Chicago | 0 | 0 | 1 | 0 | 0 | 0 | 0 | 2 | 0 | 3 | 7 | 0 |
| Boston | 0 | 0 | 0 | 0 | 0 | 0 | 0 | 0 | 0 | 0 | 5 | 0 |
WP: Hippo Vaughn (1–2) LP: Sad Sam Jones (0–1)

Vaughn finally earned a Series victory in Game 5 with a five-hit shutout, as the Cubs rallied back for a 3–0 victory. Dode Paskert's two-run double in the top of the eighth sealed the deal for the Chicagoans after Mann had knocked in the first run in the top of the third.

=== Game 6 ===
Wednesday, September 11, 1918 2:30 pm (ET) at Fenway Park in Boston, Massachusetts
| Team | 1 | 2 | 3 | 4 | 5 | 6 | 7 | 8 | 9 | R | H | E |
|---|---|---|---|---|---|---|---|---|---|---|---|---|
| Chicago | 0 | 0 | 0 | 1 | 0 | 0 | 0 | 0 | 0 | 1 | 3 | 2 |
| Boston | 0 | 0 | 2 | 0 | 0 | 0 | 0 | 0 | X | 2 | 5 | 0 |
WP: Carl Mays (2–0) LP: Lefty Tyler (1–1)

Attendance for Game 6 at Fenway on Wednesday, September 11, was down from over 24,000 on Tuesday to a mere 15,238, but the Red Sox went home happy. In the 3rd inning, having base runners on third and second through a series of walks and groundouts, George Whiteman (in what ended up being his final game) hit a line drive to right field that Max Flack misplayed in the field that resulted in two runs for Boston. Fred Merkle hit a single to narrow the score for Chicago to 2–1 in the 4th but the Cubs were held scoreless from there as Carl Mays threw a complete game three-hitter, with Les Mann grounding out to the second baseman to end the game and World Series.

This was the last Red Sox World Series win for 86 years, and the last time they won the deciding game at home until 2013.

The Red Sox won the series despite a team batting average of .186, lowest for a winning club in World Series history.

== Players ==
- The 1918 Boston Red Sox roster included Sam Agnew, Stuffy McInnis, Dave Shean, Fred Thomas, Everett Scott, Harry Hooper, Amos Strunk, George Whiteman, Babe Ruth, Wally Schang, Dick Hoblitzel, George Cochran, Wally Mayer, Jack Stansbury, Jack Coffey, Frank Truesdale, Walter Barbare, Hack Miller, Heinie Wagner, Eusebio Gonzalez, Red Bluhm, Carl Mays, Bullet Joe Bush, Sam Jones, Dutch Leonard, Lore Bader, Jean Dubuc, Walt Kinney, Dick McCabe, Vince Molyneaux, Bill Pertica, and Weldon Wyckoff.
- The 1918 Chicago Cubs roster included Bill Killefer, Fred Merkle, Rollie Zeider, Charlie Deal, Charlie Hollocher, Les Mann, Max Flack, Dode Paskert, Turner Barber, Bob O'Farrell, Pete Kilduff, Charlie Pick, Bill McCabe, Chuck Wortman, Rowdy Elliott, Tom Daly, Fred Lear, Tommy Clarke, Lefty Tyler, Hippo Vaughn, Claude Hendrix, Phil Douglas, Paul Carter, Speed Martin, Roy Walker, Grover Cleveland ("Ol' Pete") Alexander, Harry Weaver, Vic Aldridge, and Buddy Napier.

== Composite box ==
1918 World Series (4–2): Boston Red Sox (A.L.) over Chicago Cubs (N.L.)

| Team | 1 | 2 | 3 | 4 | 5 | 6 | 7 | 8 | 9 | R | H | E |
|---|---|---|---|---|---|---|---|---|---|---|---|---|
| Boston Red Sox | 0 | 0 | 2 | 5 | 0 | 0 | 0 | 1 | 1 | 9 | 32 | 1 |
| Chicago Cubs | 0 | 3 | 1 | 1 | 1 | 0 | 0 | 4 | 0 | 10 | 37 | 5 |
Total attendance: 128,483 Average attendance: 21,414; Winning player's share: $1,103 Losing player's share: $671

== Series Statistics ==
=== Boston Red Sox ===
==== Batting ====
Note: GP=Games played; AB=At bats; R=Runs; H=Hits; 2B=Doubles; 3B=Triples; HR=Home runs; RBI=Runs batted in; BB=Walks; AVG=Batting average; OBP=On base percentage; SLG=Slugging percentage

| Player | GP | AB | R | H | 2B | 3B | HR | RBI | BB | AVG | OBP | SLG | Reference |
|---|---|---|---|---|---|---|---|---|---|---|---|---|---|
| Wally Schang | 5 | 9 | 1 | 4 | 0 | 0 | 0 | 1 | 2 | .444 | .545 | .444 | |
| Stuffy McInnis | 6 | 20 | 2 | 5 | 0 | 0 | 0 | 1 | 1 | .250 | .286 | .250 | |
| Dave Shean | 6 | 19 | 2 | 4 | 1 | 0 | 0 | 0 | 4 | .211 | .348 | .263 | |
| Fred Thomas | 6 | 17 | 0 | 2 | 0 | 0 | 0 | 0 | 1 | .118 | .167 | .118 | |
| Everett Scott | 6 | 20 | 0 | 2 | 0 | 0 | 0 | 1 | 1 | .100 | .143 | .100 | |
| George Whiteman | 6 | 20 | 2 | 5 | 0 | 1 | 0 | 1 | 2 | .250 | .348 | .350 | |
| Amos Strunk | 6 | 23 | 1 | 4 | 1 | 1 | 0 | 0 | 0 | .174 | .174 | .304 | |
| Harry Hooper | 6 | 20 | 0 | 4 | 0 | 0 | 0 | 0 | 2 | .200 | .273 | .200 | |
| Sam Agnew | 4 | 9 | 0 | 0 | 0 | 0 | 0 | 0 | 0 | .000 | .000 | .000 | |
| Jean Dubuc | 1 | 1 | 0 | 0 | 0 | 0 | 0 | 0 | 0 | .000 | .000 | .000 | |
| Hack Miller | 1 | 1 | 0 | 0 | 0 | 0 | 0 | 0 | 0 | .000 | .000 | .000 | |
| Carl Mays | 2 | 5 | 1 | 1 | 0 | 0 | 0 | 0 | 1 | .200 | .333 | .200 | |
| Babe Ruth | 3 | 5 | 0 | 1 | 0 | 1 | 0 | 2 | 0 | .200 | .200 | .600 | |
| Bullet Joe Bush | 2 | 2 | 0 | 0 | 0 | 0 | 0 | 0 | 1 | .000 | .333 | .000 | |
| Sad Sam Jones | 1 | 1 | 0 | 0 | 0 | 0 | 0 | 0 | 1 | .000 | .500 | .000 | |

==== Pitching ====
Note: G=Games Played; GS=Games Started; IP=Innings Pitched; H=Hits; BB=Walks; R=Runs; ER=Earned Runs; SO=Strikeouts; W=Wins; L=Losses; SV=Saves; ERA=Earned Run Average

| Player | G | GS | IP | H | BB | R | ER | SO | W | L | SV | ERA | Reference |
|---|---|---|---|---|---|---|---|---|---|---|---|---|---|
| Carl Mays | 2 | 2 | 18 | 10 | 3 | 2 | 2 | 5 | 2 | 0 | 0 | 1.00 | |
| Babe Ruth | 2 | 2 | 17 | 13 | 7 | 2 | 2 | 4 | 2 | 0 | 0 | 1.06 | |
| Bullet Joe Bush | 2 | 1 | 9 | 7 | 3 | 3 | 3 | 0 | 0 | 1 | 1 | 3.00 | |
| Sad Sam Jones | 1 | 1 | 9 | 7 | 5 | 3 | 3 | 5 | 0 | 1 | 0 | 3.00 | |

=== Chicago Cubs ===
==== Batting ====
Note: GP=Games played; AB=At bats; R=Runs; H=Hits; 2B=Doubles; 3B=Triples; HR=Home runs; RBI=Runs batted in; BB=Walks; AVG=Batting average; OBP=On base percentage; SLG=Slugging percentage

| Player | GP | AB | R | H | 2B | 3B | HR | RBI | BB | AVG | OBP | SLG | Reference |
|---|---|---|---|---|---|---|---|---|---|---|---|---|---|
| Bill Killefer | 6 | 17 | 2 | 2 | 1 | 0 | 0 | 2 | 2 | .118 | .211 | .176 | |
| Fred Merkle | 6 | 18 | 1 | 5 | 0 | 0 | 0 | 1 | 4 | .278 | .409 | .278 | |
| Charlie Pick | 6 | 18 | 2 | 7 | 1 | 0 | 0 | 0 | 1 | .389 | .421 | .444 | |
| Charlie Deal | 6 | 17 | 0 | 3 | 0 | 0 | 0 | 0 | 0 | .176 | .176 | .176 | |
| Charlie Hollocher | 6 | 21 | 2 | 4 | 0 | 1 | 0 | 1 | 1 | .190 | .227 | .286 | |
| Les Mann | 6 | 22 | 0 | 5 | 2 | 0 | 0 | 2 | 0 | .227 | .261 | .318 | |
| Dode Paskert | 6 | 21 | 0 | 4 | 1 | 0 | 0 | 2 | 2 | .190 | .261 | .238 | |
| Max Flack | 6 | 19 | 2 | 5 | 0 | 0 | 0 | 0 | 4 | .263 | .417 | .263 | |
| Bob O'Farrell | 3 | 3 | 0 | 0 | 0 | 0 | 0 | 0 | 0 | .000 | .000 | .000 | |
| Turner Barber | 3 | 2 | 0 | 0 | 0 | 0 | 0 | 0 | 0 | .000 | .000 | .000 | |
| Bill McCabe | 3 | 1 | 1 | 0 | 0 | 0 | 0 | 0 | 0 | .000 | .000 | .000 | |
| Chuck Wortman | 1 | 1 | 0 | 0 | 0 | 0 | 0 | 0 | 0 | .000 | .000 | .000 | |
| Rollie Zeider | 2 | 0 | 0 | 0 | 0 | 0 | 0 | 0 | 2 | ─ | 1.000 | ─ | |
| Hippo Vaughn | 3 | 10 | 0 | 0 | 0 | 0 | 0 | 0 | 0 | .000 | .000 | .000 | |
| Lefty Tyler | 3 | 5 | 0 | 1 | 0 | 0 | 0 | 2 | 2 | .200 | .429 | .200 | |
| Phil Douglas | 1 | 0 | 0 | 0 | 0 | 0 | 0 | 0 | 0 | ─ | ─ | ─ | |
| Claude Hendrix | 2 | 1 | 0 | 1 | 0 | 0 | 0 | 0 | 0 | 1.000 | 1.000 | 1.000 | |

==== Pitching ====
Note: G=Games Played; GS=Games Started; IP=Innings Pitched; H=Hits; BB=Walks; R=Runs; ER=Earned Runs; SO=Strikeouts; W=Wins; L=Losses; SV=Saves; ERA=Earned Run Average

| Player | G | GS | IP | H | BB | R | ER | SO | W | L | SV | ERA | Reference |
|---|---|---|---|---|---|---|---|---|---|---|---|---|---|
| Hippo Vaughn | 3 | 3 | 27 | 17 | 5 | 3 | 3 | 17 | 1 | 2 | 0 | 1.00 | |
| Lefty Tyler | 3 | 3 | 23 | 14 | 11 | 5 | 3 | 4 | 1 | 1 | 0 | 1.17 | |
| Phil Douglas | 1 | 0 | 1 | 1 | 0 | 1 | 0 | 0 | 0 | 1 | 0 | 0.00 | |
| Claude Hendrix | 1 | 0 | 1 | 0 | 0 | 0 | 0 | 0 | 0 | 0 | 0 | 0.00 | |

== Allegations of a Series fix and game tampering ==
As with the 1917 World Series, there were concerns about whether the 1918 World Series was being played honestly, a rumor revived in 2005 and explored further in the 2009 book The Original Curse by Sean Deveney (McGraw-Hill). Some of the Cubs were later suspected of being "crooked". Pitcher Phil Douglas, accused of conspiring to fix a regular-season game in 1922, was suspended for life. Pitcher Claude Hendrix, who didn't play much in the 1918 Series, was suspected of fixing a game in 1920 but retired after that season and was never officially suspended.

There was no solid evidence that the 1918 World Series itself was "fixed", and with the war dominating the news nothing came of the rumors. It was another season before baseball's relationship with gambling erupted in a major scandal. Star pitcher "Ol' Pete" Alexander of the Cubs saw almost no action in the 1918 regular season due to military service and none in the Series. This left the Cubs pitching corps thin compared to the strong Red Sox staff, which included Babe Ruth and Carl Mays. Hippo Vaughn was the strongest Cubs pitcher, having won the pitching triple crown in 1918, but had the misfortune of starting against the best arms the Red Sox had and taking two of the four Cub losses.

In 2011, a document discovered by the Chicago History Museum cited the court testimony of Chisox pitcher Eddie Cicotte during the investigation of the 1919 Black Sox Scandal a year after the 1918 World Series. According to the trial transcript, Cicotte made vague references and allegations that the Cubs had purposely lost the 1918 World Series to the Red Sox, and justified their "fixing" the games they had lost (all four by one run) by alleging that the owners of both teams had short-changed their players with insufficient shares of the gate receipts.

== Sources ==
- Cohen, Richard M.; Neft, David S. (1990). The World Series: Complete Play-By-Play of Every Game, 1903–1989. New York: St. Martin's Press. pp. 71–75. ISBN 0-312-03960-3.
- Reichler, Joseph (1982). The Baseball Encyclopedia (5th ed.). Macmillan Publishing. p. 2126. ISBN 0-02-579010-2.
