= 1921 Boston Braves season =

1921 Boston Braves
- League: National League
- Ballpark: Braves Field
- City: Boston, Massachusetts
- Record: 79–74 (.516)
- League place: 4th
- Owners: George W. Grant
- Managers: Fred Mitchell

The 1921 Boston Braves season was the 51st season of the franchise.

== Regular season ==
=== Season standings ===
National League
Team	W	L	Pct.	GB	Home	Road
New York Giants	94	59	.614	—	53‍–‍26	41‍–‍33
Pittsburgh Pirates	90	63	.588	4	45‍–‍31	45‍–‍32
St. Louis Cardinals	87	66	.569	7	48‍–‍29	39‍–‍37
Boston Braves	79	74	.516	15	42‍–‍32	37‍–‍42
Brooklyn Robins	77	75	.507	16½	41‍–‍37	36‍–‍38
Cincinnati Reds	70	83	.458	24	40‍–‍36	30‍–‍47
Chicago Cubs	64	89	.418	30	32‍–‍44	32‍–‍45
Philadelphia Phillies	51	103	.331	43½	29‍–‍47	22‍–‍56

=== Record vs. opponents ===
1921 National League record Sources:
Team	BSN	BRO	CHC	CIN	NYG	PHI	PIT	STL
Boston	—	11–11	14–8	13–9	8–13	14–8	9–13	10–12
Brooklyn	11–11	—	10–11	10–11	12–10	16–6	10–12	8–14
Chicago	8–14	11–10	—	13–9	8–14	11–11	5–17	8–14
Cincinnati	9–13	11–10	9–13	—	8–14	13–9	8–14	12–10
New York	13–8	10–12	14–8	14–8	—	16–6	16–6	11–11
Philadelphia	8–14	6–16	11–11	9–13	6–16	—	4–18	7–15
Pittsburgh	13–9	12–10	17–5	14–8	6–16	18–4	—	10–11–1
St. Louis	12–10	14–8	14–8	10–12	11–11	15–7	11–10–1	—

=== Roster ===
1921 Boston Braves
Roster
Pitchers: Garland Braxton; Johnny Cooney; Eddie Eayrs; Dana Fillingim; Hugh McQuillan; Cy Morgan; Joe Oeschger; Al Pierotti; Jack Scott; Ira Townsend; Leo Townsend; Mule Watson	Catchers: Frank Gibson; Hank Gowdy; Mickey O'Neil; Infielders: Walter Barbare; Tony Boeckel; Lloyd Christenbury; Hod Ford; Walter Holke	Outfielders: Walton Cruise; Fred Nicholson; Al Nixon; Ray Powell; Billy Southworth; Other batters: John Sullivan	Manager: Fred Mitchell

== Player stats ==
=== Batting ===
==== Starters by position ====
Note: Pos = Position; G = Games played; AB = At bats; H = Hits; Avg. = Batting average; HR = Home runs; RBI = Runs batted in

Pos	Player	G	AB	H	Avg.	HR	RBI
C	Mickey O'Neil	98	277	69	.249	2	29
1B	Walter Holke	150	579	151	.261	3	63
2B	Hod Ford	152	555	155	.279	2	61
SS	Walter Barbare	134	550	166	.302	0	49
3B	Tony Boeckel	153	592	185	.313	10	84
OF	Billy Southworth	141	569	175	.308	7	79
OF	Ray Powell	149	624	191	.306	12	74
OF	Walton Cruise	108	344	119	.346	8	55

==== Other batters ====
Note: G = Games played; AB = At bats; H = Hits; Avg. = Batting average; HR = Home runs; RBI = Runs batted in

Player	G	AB	H	Avg.	HR	RBI
Fred Nicholson	83	245	80	.327	5	41
Hank Gowdy	64	164	49	.299	2	17
Al Nixon	55	138	33	.239	1	9
Lloyd Christenbury	62	125	44	.352	3	16
Frank Gibson	63	125	33	.264	2	13
John Sullivan	5	5	0	.000	0	0

=== Pitching ===
==== Starting pitchers ====
Note: G = Games pitched; IP = Innings pitched; W = Wins; L = Losses; ERA = Earned run average; SO = Strikeouts

Player	G	IP	W	L	ERA	SO
Joe Oeschger	46	299.0	20	14	3.52	68
Mule Watson	44	259.1	14	13	3.85	48
Hugh McQuillan	45	250.0	13	17	4.00	94
Leo Townsend	1	1.1	0	1	27.00	0

==== Other pitchers ====
Note: G = Games pitched; IP = Innings pitched; W = Wins; L = Losses; ERA = Earned run average; SO = Strikeouts

Player	G	IP	W	L	ERA	SO
Dana Fillingim	44	239.2	15	10	3.45	54
Jack Scott	47	233.2	15	13	3.70	83

==== Relief pitchers ====
Note: G = Games pitched; W = Wins; L = Losses; SV = Saves; ERA = Earned run average; SO = Strikeouts

Player	G	W	L	SV	ERA	SO
Garland Braxton	17	1	3	0	4.82	16
Cy Morgan	17	1	1	1	6.53	8
Johnny Cooney	8	0	1	0	3.92	9
Ira Townsend	4	0	0	0	6.14	0
Eddie Eayrs	2	0	0	0	17.36	1
Al Pierotti	2	0	1	0	21.60	1
