= Brooklyn Dodgers 1, Boston Braves 1 (26 innings) =

1920 baseball game

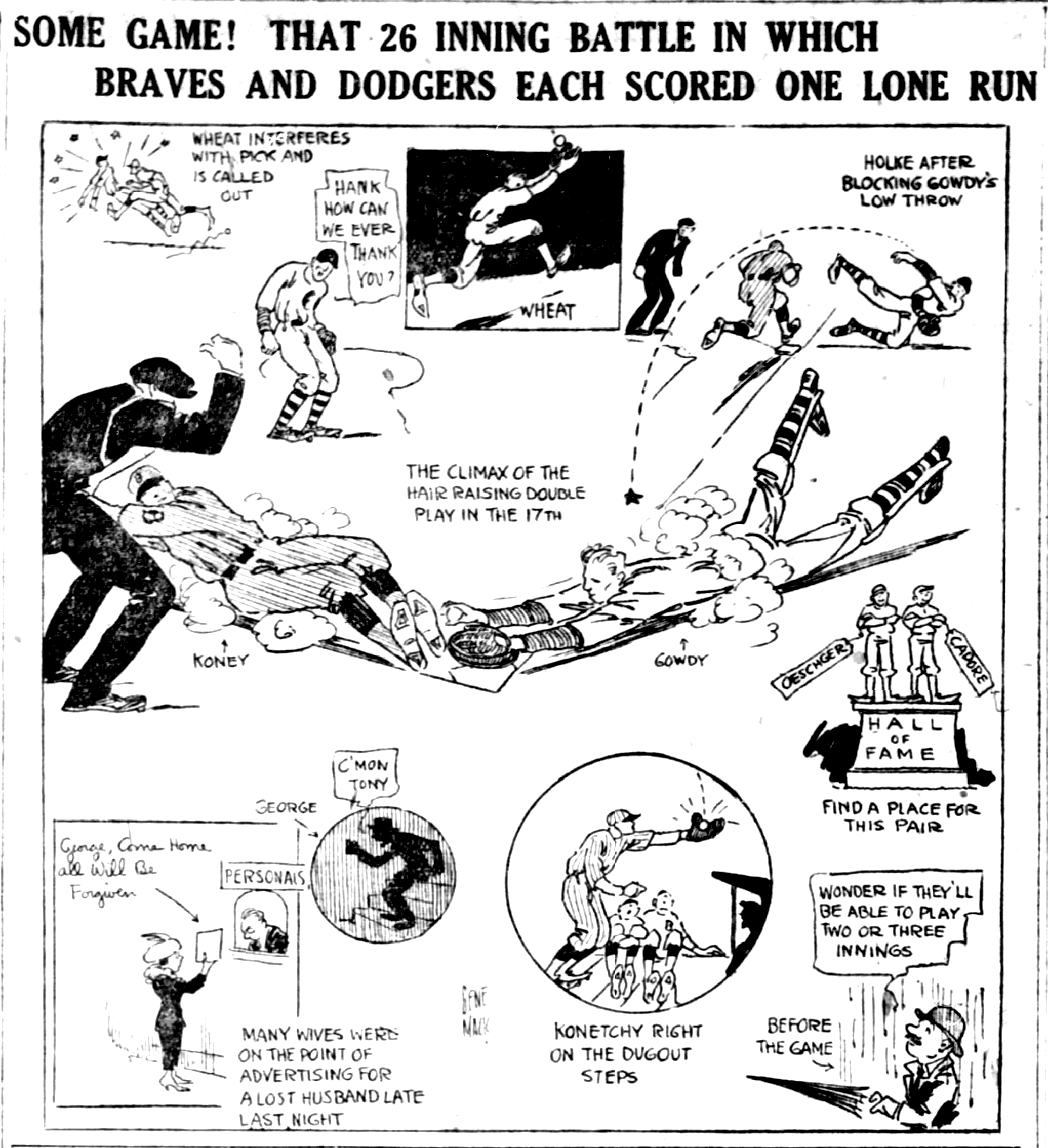
Depiction of the game from The Boston Globe

On Saturday, May 1, 1920, the Brooklyn Dodgers and the Boston Braves played to a 1–1 tie in 26 innings, the most innings ever played in a single game in the history of Major League Baseball (MLB). The game was played at Braves Field in Boston, Massachusetts, United States, before a crowd estimated at 4,000. Both Leon Cadore of Brooklyn and Joe Oeschger of Boston pitched complete games, and with 26 innings pitched, jointly hold the record for the longest pitching appearance in MLB history. Their record is considered unbreakable, as modern pitchers rarely pitch even nine innings, and newer baseball rules have made long extra-innings games a rarity.

The day of the game saw rainy weather, and it was uncertain if the game would be played, but the skies cleared enough to allow it to proceed. Brooklyn scored a run in the fifth inning, and Boston in the sixth; thereafter, the pitchers became increasingly dominant. As the game exceeded eighteen innings, the small crowd at Braves Field cheered both pitchers. The last twenty innings were scoreless, and when darkness started to fall, the umpires called a halt after the twenty-sixth inning, as baseball fields did not yet have artificial lighting.

There have been claims that the lengthy pitching appearance ruined the arms of Oeschger and Cadore, but both pitched several more years in the major leagues, and Oeschger won twenty games in 1921. The performance meant that they remained better known than other former major leaguers of that era. Although 25-inning games were played in the major leagues in 1974 and 1984, each team involved used several pitchers, and the records for endurance posted by Oeschger and Cadore were not threatened. No major league pitcher has pitched twenty innings in a game since 1929.

== Background ==
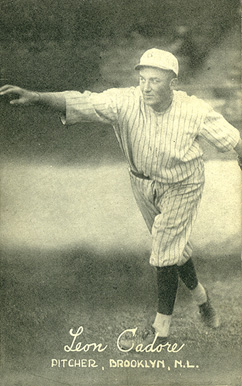
Leon Cadore on a 1922 baseball card

On May 1, 1920, the Brooklyn Dodgers played the Boston Braves at Braves Field in Boston. The Dodgers, or Robins, as they were then sometimes called after their manager, Wilbert Robinson, had won the National League title in 1916. Although they had fallen to fifth place by 1919, they were well-regarded as the 1920 season began. Leon Cadore was not the ace of Robinson's pitching staff—Burleigh Grimes was—but he had a 14–12 win-loss record in 1919, his best performance to that point. On May 25, 1919, Cadore was involved in a well-known stunt, pulled by Casey Stengel, then a member of the Pittsburgh Pirates who had been traded from the Dodgers. Cadore captured a sparrow and gave it to Stengel, who placed it under his cap. Called to bat, Stengel received mixed boos and cheers from the Brooklyn crowd as a former Dodger and doffed his cap, whereupon the bird flew away to great laughter from the crowd. Stengel later stated of Cadore, who was a roommate while both were with the Dodgers, "Wonderful person, wonderful pitcher with a brilliant mind."

The Braves in 1920 were several years on from their great success, in 1914, when manager George Stallings led the team dubbed the Miracle Braves from last place on the Fourth of July to a sweep of the that year's World Series. The starting pitcher for the Braves on May 1, 1920, Joe Oeschger, had a 15–14 win-loss record in 1917, falling to 6–18 in 1918 and 4–4 in 1919. A year and a day before the May 1 game, Oeschger, then a member of the Philadelphia Phillies, had pitched 20 innings in a 9–9 tie with Brooklyn, with Grimes pitching for the Dodgers. Ties, brought on by adverse weather or the fall of darkness, were common in MLB in the time before night baseball. Later in 1919, Oeschger had been traded to the New York Giants and then to Boston. Both Oeschger and Cadore were 28-year-old right-handers.

The Dodgers had won eight of their first twelve games going into May 1, and were in second place out of eight in the National League standings, half a game behind the 1919 World Series winners, the Cincinnati Reds. Boston had a 4–5 record and was in fifth place, 3 1/2 games behind the Reds. Earlier in the 1920 season, Oeschger and Cadore had opposed each other in Brooklyn, with Cadore the winning pitcher over Oeschger, 1–0 in 11 innings.

The morning of May 1 saw light rain in Boston; Cadore and his roommate, Les Mann, were expecting a rainout. Hearing no word from their ball club, they reported to Braves Field for the 3:00 pm game, and Cadore learned he would be the starting pitcher if the game was played. Robinson spent his time before the game entertaining the baseball writers with tales of the old Baltimore Orioles, for whom he had played. Stallings, who was deeply superstitious, preferred not to announce his starting pitcher until just before game time. The Boston manager was outraged when a Brooklyn player casually walked by the home dugout, scattering peanuts to attract pigeons. Stallings hated the birds, something well-known in the National League.

By game time, the rain had slowed, and the weather was cold and blustery. Oeschger remembered, "We didn't think the game would be played, but we had to report to the park. It was a Saturday, and I didn't think I would pitch because Manager Stallings usually pitched me on Sundays because I went to church. He always played his hunches." But with Sunday baseball still illegal in Massachusetts, the Braves had no game the following day, and Oeschger was given the Saturday afternoon start. He was glad to hear that Cadore would be starting for Brooklyn, wanting revenge for the extra-inning loss.

== Game ==
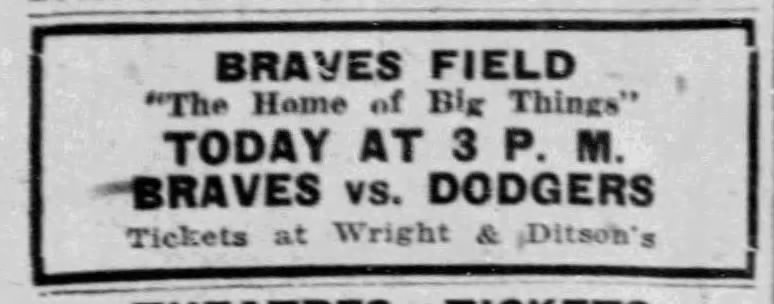
Advertisement for baseball tickets for the May 1 game

With the weather threatening rain, few believed it would be possible to start the game, let alone finish it. Thus, only 4,000 or so fans went to Braves Field to view the contest. It was drizzling as the game began, with a game time temperature of 49 °F (9 °C).

=== First nine innings ===
In the top of the first inning, although Brooklyn's right fielder, Bernie Neis, reached on a throwing error by the Boston second baseman, Charlie Pick, he was promptly picked off first base by Oeschger. Third baseman Jimmy Johnston singled, and was left at first base when Zack Wheat hit a pop fly to second base. In the bottom of the first, the Boston center fielder, Ray Powell, walked to lead off the inning; Cadore retired the next three batters and Powell got no further than second base. At the end of the first inning, the rain stopped abruptly, leaving a cold wind which blew in from the Charles River slowing many fly balls and converting them to outs.

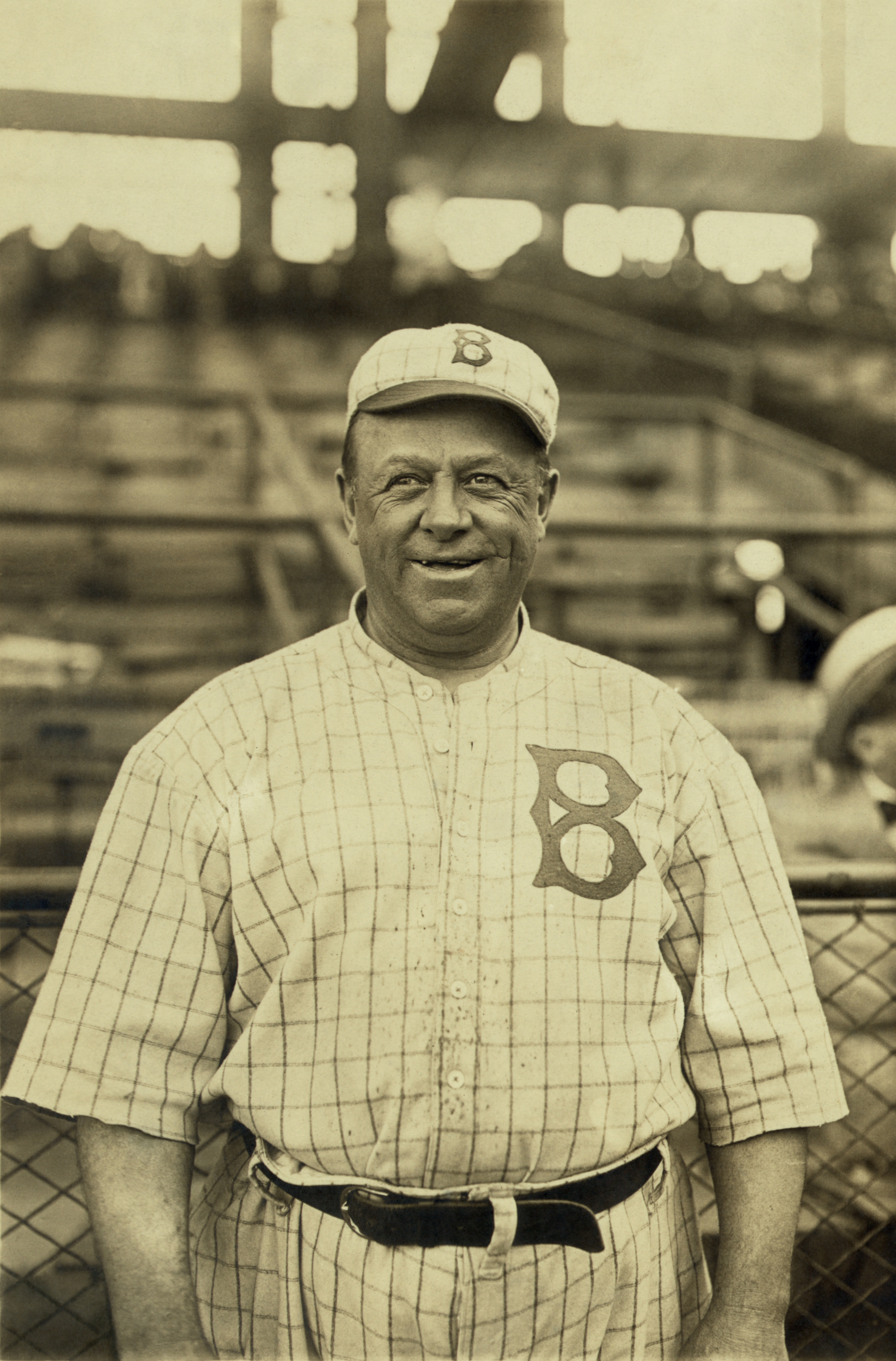
Brooklyn manager Wilbert Robinson

Brooklyn center fielder Hy Myers led off the top of the second inning with a single, and advanced to second base on Pick's second error of the game. He could get no further; neither could third baseman Tony Boeckel, who singled for Boston in the bottom of the second. After Brooklyn was retired in order in the top of the third inning, Oeschger doubled to center field to lead off the home half of the inning, and Powell sacrificed him to third base. Cadore, though, retired the side without a run being scored. Wheat walked with one out in the top of the fourth inning. When Myers hit a ground ball, Wheat was ruled out for interference. Myers then stole second and Robinson sent in Wally Hood as a pinch runner (he remained in the game as center fielder). First baseman Ed Konetchy walked, and the shortstop, Chuck Ward, hit a fly ball to left field to retire the side. In the bottom of the fourth, Boeckel singled for Boston with two outs. He was caught stealing to retire the side.

In the top of the fifth, the Brooklyn catcher, Ernie Krueger, walked and Cadore grounded out to advance him to second base. Cadore's hit could have been a double play had not Oeschger bobbled it, leaving him with only the play to first. Second baseman Ivy Olson batted next, and his base hit to shallow left field allowed Krueger to score. The Brooklyn run was scored on what Oeschger remembered as a broken-bat single. Although Olson advanced to second base on an Oeschger wild pitch, he advanced no further as the pitcher struck out Neis and got Johnston to line out to left field to end the Brooklyn fifth with the Dodgers now leading, 1–0. In the bottom of the fifth, shortstop Rabbit Maranville singled and advanced to second on a sacrifice bunt from catcher Mickey O'Neil. Oeschger struck out; Powell reached first base on an error by Olson, sending Maranville to third base. Pick hit a fly-ball out to end the threat.

Oeschger allowed a single to Hood, the leadoff hitter in the top of the sixth. The baserunner was picked off first base by a throw from O'Neil. In the bottom of the sixth, right fielder Walton Cruise tripled for Boston against the Braves Field scoreboard in left field with one out. Holke hit a fly ball to shallow left field that Wheat raced in to catch just off the ground; Cruise, thinking the hit might drop, was halfway down the baseline from third base, but made it safely back as no one was covering third base, Johnston had left the base to try to reach the ball that Wheat caught. Wheat, after catching the ball, had raced to third base with it in an attempt to tag Cruise; he was too late but earned applause from the crowd for the attempt. The next batter, Boeckel, singled to tie the game at 1–1. Maranville doubled, and, trying to score, Boeckel was tagged out at home plate for the third out. Krueger, the Brooklyn catcher, made the play after Cadore relayed the ball to him, but was spiked by Boeckel and had to leave the game; he was replaced by Rowdy Elliott.

In the seventh inning, Oeschger retired the Dodgers in order, and Cadore allowed a single to Powell, who advanced to second base on a throwing error by Ward at shortstop before the Brooklyn pitcher retired the side. In the top of the eighth, Oeschger allowed a two-out single to Johnston; in the bottom of the inning, left fielder Les Mann singled, advanced to second on a Cruise sacrifice bunt, and went to third on a groundout by Holke. Boeckel hit a pop fly to shortstop to end the inning.

Oeschger retired the side in order in the top of the ninth. Maranville singled to lead off the bottom of the ninth, and Stallings sent in Lloyd Christenbury to hit for O'Neil; he also singled. Christenbury had attempted a sacrifice; Cadore's throw to first base hit him. Oeschger sacrificed the runners to second and third, and Powell was walked to load the bases with one out. Pick hit into a double play to end the threat and send the game to extra innings. Maranville had appeared to score the winning run, but Powell was ruled out at second base for running out of the baseline, voiding the run.

=== Extra innings ===
The Robins and the Braves celebrated May Day in this ordinarily peaceful city by staging a prolonged, heart-breaking struggle for twenty-six innings at Braves Field and bombing to bits all major league records for duration of hostilities. When darkness drew its mantle over the scene, forbidding further battle, both teams were still on their feet, interlocked in a death clutch and each praying for one more inning in which to get the knockout blow.

As far as results in the chase for the pennant go the game was without effect, for the final score was 1 to 1. In the matter of thrills however, the oldest living man can remember nothing like it, nor can he find anything like it in his granddad's diary worth of comparison. Heart disease was the mildest complaint that grasped the spectators as they watched inning after inning slip away and the row of ciphers on the scoreboard began to slip over the fence and reach out into the Fenway. Nervous prostration threatened to engulf the stands as the twentieth inning passed away in the scoreless routine and the word was passed from the knowing fans to those of inferior baseball erudition that the National League record was twenty-two innings, the Robins having beat the Pirates by 6 to 5 in a game of that length played in Brooklyn on August 22, 1917.

— The New York Times, "Brooklyn and Boston break big league record by battling for twenty-six innings". May 2, 1920, p. 20.

Stallings sent Hank Gowdy into the game as catcher, as the manager had pinch-hit for O'Neil. The batters were swinging for the one long hit that might win the game. These swings made it easy for the pitchers to retire them. During the eleventh inning, it started to drizzle again. The pitchers allowed few baserunners as the game lengthened through the first few extra innings: Oeschger retired every batter after the ninth inning until Wheat singled with two outs in the fourteenth. Cadore, after retiring the side in order for the first time in the game in the tenth inning, allowed a two-out single to Gowdy in the eleventh, a two-out walk to Mann in the twelfth, a leadoff single to Holke in the thirteenth and a one-out walk to Powell in the fourteenth. None of these five baserunners was able to advance.

Cruise walked to lead off the bottom of the fifteenth, and Holke attempted a sacrifice but both men were safe, putting runners on first and second with no outs. Consecutive groundouts by Boeckel and Maranville, each forcing a runner at third base, and a fly ball out by Gowdy, sent the game to a sixteenth inning. Although Neis singled for Brooklyn with two outs in the sixteenth, he was left at first base. Boston went in order in the bottom of the inning, though Oeschger nearly won his own game with a long drive to left field that required Wheat to make a leaping catch in front of the wall.

In the top of the seventeenth, Wheat singled and Hood sacrificed him to second. Konetchy singled, sending Wheat to third base with one out. Ward hit the ball to Maranville at shortstop; he threw to third base, hoping to catch Wheat off the bag, but Wheat scrambled back and was safe. With the bases loaded, Elliott grounded to Oeschger, who threw home to Gowdy for the force out. Gowdy threw to first base in an attempt to complete the double play, but his throw was off line, and the best Holke could do is knock it down. Konetchy saw this and tried to score; he was tagged out in front of home plate by Gowdy after Holke threw the ball back to him.

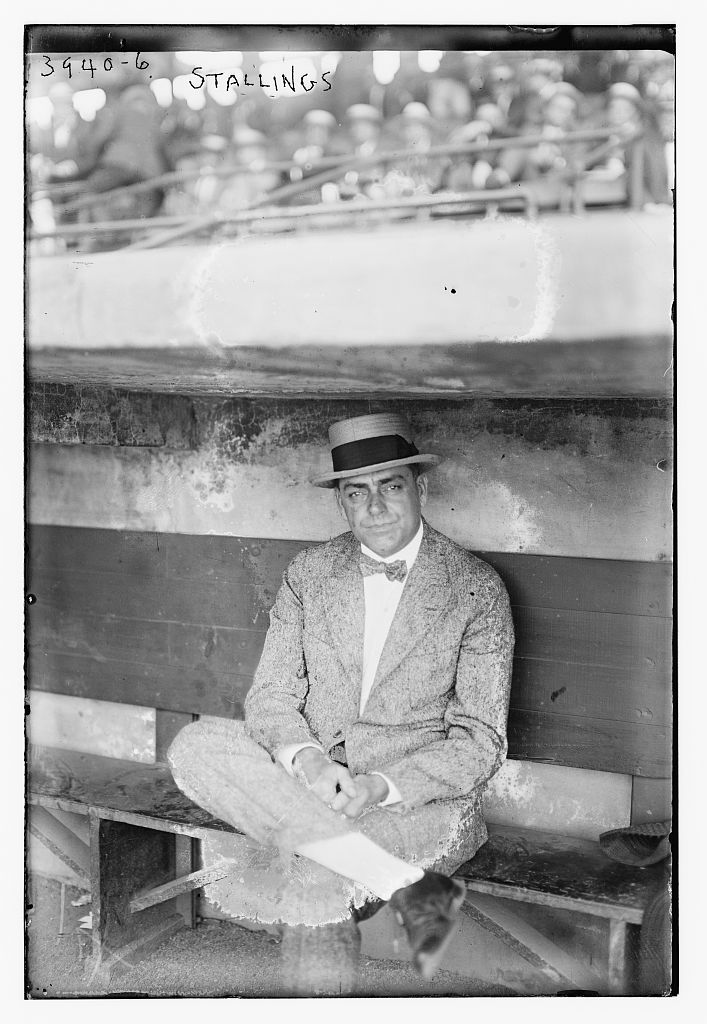
Boston manager George Stallings

Oeschger remembered, "I was getting tired by the eighteenth inning, but the players kept telling me: 'Just one inning, Joe, and we'll get a run.' Stallings never did ask me if I wanted to come out. But the batters were griping to stop the game. I didn't want to stop." Stallings did assure Oeschger, "Hold 'em, we'll get 'em next inning"; Cadore later stated that had Robinson tried to remove the Brooklyn pitcher from the game, he would have strangled his own manager. By the nineteenth inning, the crowd was impartially cheering both pitchers, whenever one of them left the pitcher's mound or came to bat. There was only one baserunner in the eighteenth through twenty-first innings, Mann, who singled to lead off the home half of the twentieth inning, and was picked off first base by a throw from catcher Elliott. During the twentieth inning, Robinson offered to relieve Cadore; the Brooklyn pitcher replied, "If that other fellow can go one more inning, I can too." Explained Oeschger, "If a pitcher couldn't go the distance, he soon found himself some other form of occupation."

In the top of the twenty-second inning, Hood walked with two outs and stole second, and was left there as Konetsky grounded out. There were no baserunners in the twenty-third, twenty-fourth and twenty-fifth innings. The twenty-fifth inning broke the MLB record for longest game in terms of innings; the previous record of twenty-four was set by the Philadelphia Athletics and Boston Red Sox on September 1, 1905. Several of the unused players on the Brooklyn bench, led by Grimes, asked their manager for the opportunity to play in the history-making marathon game. Robinson stayed with the lineup, and the pitcher, he had.

No one reached base for the Dodgers in the top of the twenty-sixth inning. In the bottom of the inning, Holke got an bunt single with two outs, but could not advance. According to Oeschger, the outfielders were complaining they could not see the ball; there was no artificial light as the game preceded night baseball. After the twenty-sixth inning, the home plate umpire, Barry McCormick, surveyed the increasing darkness on the field and consulted with the two managers. Olson did not wish to stop, wanting the distinction of having played the equivalent of three games that would come with the 27th inning, and asked McCormick to continue. The umpire responded, "Not without a miner's lamp" and ended the game, which finished as a 1–1 tie. Played on the first day of Daylight Savings Time for 1920, the game lasted three hours and fifty minutes. The marginal weather conditions ("dark clouds and mist") resulted in inadequate lighting with almost an hour to go before sunset. The fans booed as the game was called. McCormick later stated that he had been hoping for a tie, and that it would have been a shame for either pitcher to lose the game.

Oeschger stated, "I certainly didn't want it to stop and I'm sure Cadore didn't either." Starting with the eighteenth inning, he had pitched the equivalent of a no hitter, allowing Brooklyn no hits and one walk in the final nine innings. Cadore, after his struggles in the first nine innings, had not allowed a Boston runner to reach third base in extra innings, and only two had reached second base. He stated in the clubhouse, "I found myself growing sleepy at the finish." Wheat quipped, "I carried enough lumber to the plate to build a house today." Only three baseballs were used in the entire contest.

== Records set ==
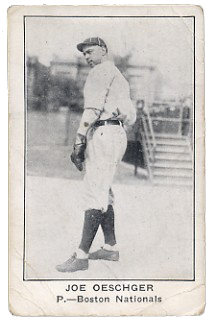
Joe Oeschger still holds a number of MLB records.

The game set many MLB records, which still stand as of 2026. The May 1, 1920, game remains MLB's longest in terms of innings. Twice, MLB games have gone 25 innings, in 1974 and 1984. In the 1974 game, the St. Louis Cardinals used seven pitchers in a 4–3 victory over the New York Mets, who used six. Claude Osteen went the longest, pitching 9 1/3 innings. On May 8, 1984, the Chicago White Sox used eight pitchers to defeat the Milwaukee Brewers (who used six), 7–6; Chuck Porter went the longest, pitching 7 1/3 innings. Philip J. Lowry, in his 2010 study of extra inning games, predicted a 50 percent chance that the record of 26 innings played by two teams in one MLB game would be broken in the next 60 years. In 2020, however, MLB instituted a rule that teams start each extra inning with an automatic runner at second base, something that has greatly reduced the number of long extra inning games.

Cadore and Oeschger jointly hold the MLB records for longest pitching appearance and longest complete game. The May 1, 1920, game made Oeschger the only pitcher in MLB history to twice pitch twenty innings in a game, a distinction he still holds. No player has pitched twenty or more innings in an MLB game since 1929. According to Baseball Almanac, neither the record of 26 innings pitched in a game, nor Oeschger's record of two twenty-inning appearances, will ever be broken. Columnist Harry Missildine wrote in 1970, "You know the line, 'Records are made to be broken'. Seems more likely the one shared by Joe Oeschger and Leon Cadore was made to stand forever." In 2007, sports columnist Bill Valyo agreed that the record would never be broken, as the increased use of the relief pitcher made it highly unlikely a pitcher could be called upon to pitch so long. According to Warren Corbett of the Society for American Baseball Research, writing in 2015, "Today a 26-inning complete game seems preposterous, not to mention abusive."

Oeschger also holds the record for consecutive scoreless innings in a single game, with 21 2/3. Cadore faced 96 batters, a record for an MLB game (second is Oeschger with 90). Cadore's twelve assists in an MLB game by a pitcher tied a record set by Nick Altrock of the White Sox in 1908; no one has ever broken it. Charlie Pick is the only player in MLB history to have eleven at bats in a game without getting a hit. No one has ever equaled Holke's record of 42 putouts in a game by a first baseman. Those putouts, together with Holke's assist in the 1–2–3–2 double play in the seventeenth inning, gave him 43 total chances, also an MLB record for a first baseman.

== Reaction and aftermath ==
In addition to the hometown Boston reporters, only Eddie Murphy of the New York Sun and Tommy Rice of the Brooklyn Eagle had covered the game. As word got out about the marathon game, the writers were deluged with requests for stories and special reports. Since the press box at Braves Field lacked electric lighting, the writers, the official scorer, and the Western Union telegraphist did their postgame work by candlelight. Despite their efforts, the game was overshadowed in the headlines because on May 1, Babe Ruth hit his first home run as a member of the New York Yankees.

The day after the game, James C. O'Leary of The Boston Globe deemed it "one of the greatest games ever played", and Cadore's and Oeschger's duel "the most wonderful pitching stunt ever performed, and some classy playing in thrilling situations, such as one sees only once in a lifetime". O'Leary stated that the pitching duel "was a battle of giants, fought until both were practically exhausted, but neither giving a sign of giving up. There was glory enough in it for both, and after the 24th inning it really would have been a pity for either one to be declared the loser."

Also on May 2, National League president John Heydler sent both pitchers congratulatory messages, especially expressing his pleasure that the pitching feat had taken place under baseball's new rules, that banned the spitball. The Dodgers, leaving Cadore behind at their hotel, traveled to Brooklyn that Sunday to play the Phillies and lost in 13 innings. They then returned to Boston and lost to the Braves in 19 innings. Thus, they played 58 innings over 3 days and had only a tie to show for it. Neither pitcher was used again for over a week, Oeschger pleading a leg muscle he had pulled while running the day after the game, and Cadore that his arm was so tired he could not comb his hair for three days, but each soon returned to his place in the pitching rotation. At the time, tie games were replayed if the schedule allowed an opportunity to do so (or if the outcome of the game mattered in the pennant race), and the May 1 game was replayed as the second game of a doubleheader on June 25, Boston winning 4–2. Neither Cadore nor Oeschger pitched in the game, though Cadore was the winning pitcher of the regularly scheduled first game. Brooklyn was the National League champion for 1920; Boston finished seventh. Both Oeschger and Cadore won 15 games in 1920. Cadore pitched twice for the Dodgers in their loss to the Cleveland Indians in the 1920 World Series, compiling a record of 0–1.

O'Leary predicted that Cadore and Oeschger had "undoubtedly established a record which will stand as long as they live". A myth arose, which long persisted in baseball, that both pitchers had ruined their arms in the marathon effort. In fact, both men pitched in the major leagues for several years after the game, Oeschger having the best year of his career in 1921 with 21 wins, and Cadore winning 13 games. Records of the number of pitches they threw on May 1 were not kept; Cadore estimated he had thrown at least 300, and Oeschger put his figure at around 250.

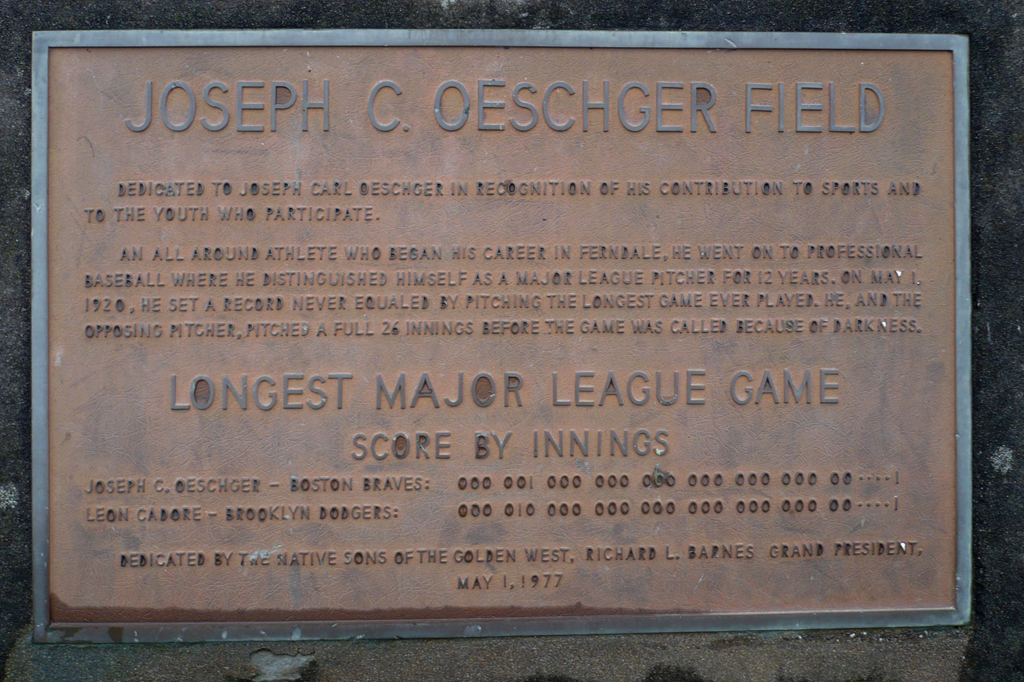
Plaque honoring Oeschger, Ferndale, California

Cadore died in 1958 at age 66, having played most of his MLB career with the Dodgers, with brief stints with the Chicago White Sox and New York Giants, compiling a lifetime record of 68–72. He married the daughter of Brooklyn owner Charles H. Ebbets and worked as a stockbroker. That employment ended with the Wall Street Crash of 1929, after which he held other jobs. During his final hospitalization, his old roommate, Casey Stengel, sent him a telegram, "Hope you catch another sparrow and pitch another 26-inning game." According to his obituary, his 26-inning performance "lifted Cadore from the comparative obscurity of 'an old major leaguer' to fame forever in one of the great pitching feats of all time". Sportswriter Bert Randolph Sugar wrote, "for Cadore and Oeschger, [the May 1 game] would so intertwine their names that they would forever be known in tandem".

Oeschger retired from MLB in 1925 with a lifetime record of 83–116, and was a junior high school physical education teacher in the San Francisco school system for many years. In 1983, he threw out the ceremonial first pitch in Philadelphia during the World Series. He died in Rohnert Park, California, in 1986 at age 94. Throughout his life, Oeschger continued to receive autograph requests for pitching the 26-inning game. He had copies of the box score made and sent them out with his signature.

In 1986, Lowell Reidenbaugh for The Sporting News ranked the May 1 game as the 6th most memorable ever played in MLB; in 1994, Sugar ranked it at number 46. According to the Los Angeles Times, neither pitcher ever seemed too impressed by their feat; as Oeschger put it, "a 1–1 contest that goes 26 innings must have been dull to watch".

== Box score ==
May 1, 1920 3:00 pm (EDT) at Braves Field in Boston, Massachusetts
Team	1	2	3	4	5	6	7	8	9	10	11	12	13	14	15	16	17	18	19	20	21	22	23	24	25	26	R	H	E
Brooklyn Dodgers	0	0	0	0	1	0	0	0	0	0	0	0	0	0	0	0	0	0	0	0	0	0	0	0	0	0	1	9	2
Boston Braves	0	0	0	0	0	1	0	0	0	0	0	0	0	0	0	0	0	0	0	0	0	0	0	0	0	0	1	15	2
Starting pitchers: Brooklyn: Leon Cadore; Boston: Joe Oeschger; Attendance: 4,000 (estimated); Umpires: Barry McCormick (HP), Bob Hart

Brooklyn	AB	R	H	RBI	BB	SO	AVG
Ivy Olson, 2B	10	0	1	1	0	1	.183
Bernie Neis, RF	10	0	1	0	0	2	.188
Jimmy Johnston, 3B	10	0	2	0	0	1	.250
Zack Wheat, LF	9	0	2	0	1	0	.385
Hy Myers, CF	2	0	1	0	0	0	.298
Wally Hood, PR–CF	6	0	1	0	1	1	.250
Ed Konetchy, 1B	9	0	1	0	1	0	.264
Chuck Ward, SS	10	0	0	0	0	0	.111
Ernie Krueger, C	2	1	0	0	1	0	.238
Rowdy Elliott, C	7	0	0	0	0	1	.190
Leon Cadore, P	10	0	0	0	0	1	.125
Team totals	85	1	9	1	4	7	.106

Brooklyn	IP	H	R	ER	BB	SO	HR	ERA
Leon Cadore	26	15	1	1	5	7	0	0.87
Team totals	26	15	1	1	5	7	0	0.35

Hood ran for Myers in the fourth inning.

Boston	AB	R	H	RBI	BB	SO	AVG
Ray Powell, CF	7	0	1	0	3	0	.140
Charlie Pick, 2B	11	0	0	0	0	1	.250
Les Mann, LF	10	0	2	0	1	1	.244
Walton Cruise, RF	9	1	1	0	1	1	.243
Walter Holke, 1B	10	0	2	0	0	0	.200
Tony Boeckel, 3B	11	0	3	1	0	0	.233
Rabbit Maranville, SS	10	0	3	0	0	0	.133
Mickey O'Neil, C	2	0	0	0	0	0	.208
Lloyd Christenbury, PH	1	0	1	0	0	0	1.000
Hank Gowdy, C	6	0	1	0	0	1	.400
Joe Oeschger, P	9	0	1	0	0	3	.100
Team totals	86	1	15	1	5	7	.174

Boston	IP	H	R	ER	BB	SO	HR	ERA
Joe Oeschger	26	9	1	1	4	7	0	0.49
Team totals	26	9	1	1	4	7	0	0.35

Christenbury hit for O'Neil in the ninth inning.

== See also ==
- List of Major League Baseball records considered unbreakable
- Longest professional baseball game, 33 innings in the minor leagues in 1981.

== Sources ==
- A Baseball Century : The First 100 Years of the National League. Macmillan. 1976. OCLC 1147748172.
- Appel, Marty (2017). Casey Stengel: Baseball's Greatest Character (Kindle ed.). Doubleday. ISBN 978-0-385-54048-3.
- Craig, William J. (2012). A History of the Boston Braves: A Time Gone By. The History Press. ISBN 978-1-61423-769-3.
- Creamer, Robert W. (1996) [1984]. Stengel: His Life and Times (First Bison Books ed.). University of Nebraska Press. ISBN 978-0-8032-6367-3.
- Lowry, Philip J. (2010). Baseball's Longest Games: a Comprehensive Worldwide Record Book. McFarland & Company, Inc. ISBN 978-0-7864-4263-8.
- Macht, Norman (2004). "The 26-Inning Duel". In Charlton, James (ed.). Road Trips. Society for American Baseball Research. pp. 104–109. ISBN 978-0-910137-96-6.
- Reidenbaugh, Lowell (1986). The Sporting News Selects Baseball's 50 Greatest Games. The Sporting News. ISBN 978-0-89204-224-1.
- Stout, Glenn (2004). The Dodgers: 120 Years of Dodgers Baseball. Houghton Mifflin Harcourt. ISBN 978-1-6698-5530-9.
- Sugar, Bert Randolph (1994) [1986]. Baseball's 50 Greatest Games (revised ed.). JG Press. ISBN 978-0-914373-32-2.
