= Braves Field =

American baseball park

- "The Wigwam" "The Bee Hive" (1936–1941)
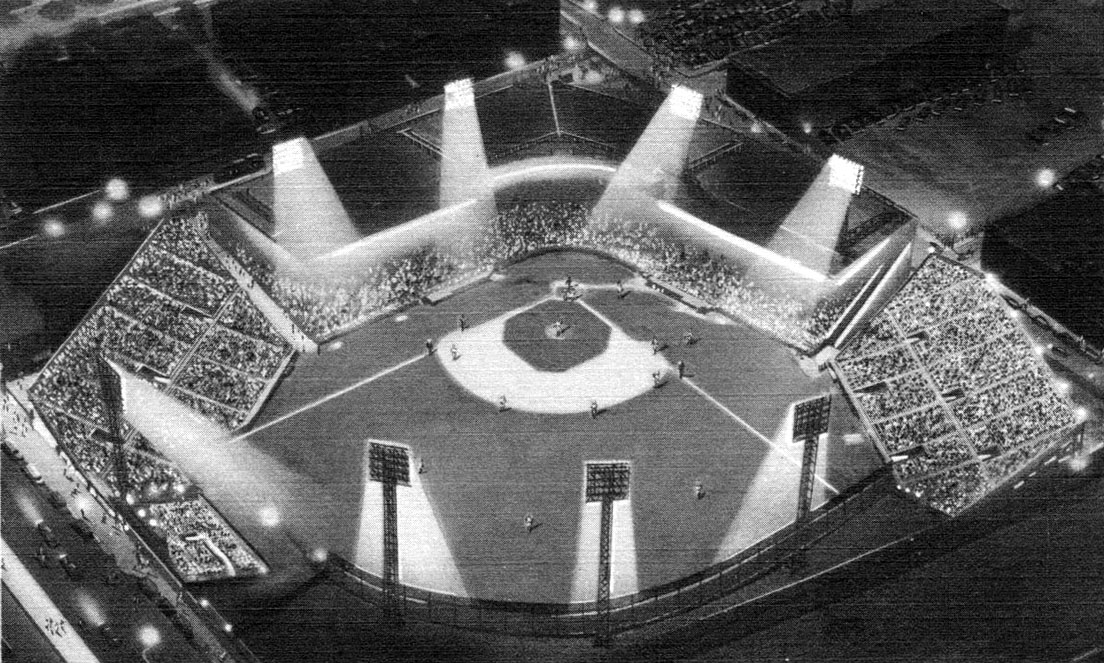
- Postcard showing the lights shortly after installation in 1946–47
- Interactive map of Braves Field
- Former names: National League Park (1936–1941); Boston University Field (1953–1955)
- Location: Commonwealth Avenue and Babcock Street; Boston, Massachusetts, U.S.
- Coordinates: 42°21′12″N 71°7′9″W
- Owner: James E. Gaffney (1915–1932); Commonwealth Realty Trust (Estate of James E. Gaffney, 1932–1949); Boston Braves (1949–1953); Boston University (1953–1955)
- Operator: Boston Braves/Bees (1915-1953); Boston University (1953=1955)
- Capacity: 40,000
- Surface: Natural grass
- Field size: Final; Left field – 337 ft (103 m); Left-center – 355 ft (108 m); Center field – 390 ft (119 m); Right-center – 355 ft (108 m); Right field – 319 ft (97 m)

Construction
- Groundbreaking: March 20, 1915
- Opened: August 18, 1915; 111 years ago
- Renovated: 1955 (reconfigured into Nickerson Field)
- Closed: September 21, 1952
- Cost: $600,000
- Architect: Osborn Engineering

Tenants
- Baseball; Boston Braves (MLB) (1915–1952); Football; Boston Bulldogs (AFL) (1926); Boston Bulldogs (NFL) (1929); Boston Braves (NFL) (1932); Boston Shamrocks (AFL) (1936–1937); Boston Yanks (NFL) (1946)

Braves Field was a baseball park located in Boston, Massachusetts. Today the site is home to Nickerson Field on the campus of Boston University. The stadium was home of the Boston Braves of the National League from 1915 to 1952, prior to the Braves' move to Milwaukee in 1953. The stadium hosted the 1936 Major League Baseball All-Star Game and Braves home games during the 1948 World Series. The Boston Red Sox used Braves Field for their home games in the 1915 and 1916 World Series since the stadium had a larger seating capacity than Fenway Park, and Sunday games from 1929 to 1932 due to grandfathered blue laws in Fenway's vicinity that didn't apply to Braves Field. Braves Field was the site of Babe Ruth's final season, playing for the Braves in 1935. From 1929 to 1932, the Boston Red Sox played select regular season games periodically at Braves Field. On May 1, 1920, Braves Field hosted the longest major league baseball game in history: 26 innings, which eventually ended in a 1–1 tie.

Braves Field was also home to multiple professional football teams between 1929 and 1948, including the first home of the National Football League (NFL) franchise that became the Washington Commanders. The pro football Braves played at the ballpark in their inaugural season of 1932, then were at Fenway Park for four seasons as the Boston Redskins before the move south in 1937 to Griffith Stadium in Washington, D.C. After the stadium was purchased, Boston University leased it to the new American Football League's Boston Patriots for the 1960–1962 seasons, before, like the Redskins, the team relocated to Fenway Park.

Located on Commonwealth Avenue at Babcock Street, the baseball field was aligned northeast, much as Fenway Park has been since it opened in April 1912. Most of the stadium was demolished in 1955, but significant portions of the original structure still stand and make up part of the Nickerson Field sports complex on the campus of Boston University.

== Professional football ==
While built for baseball and having a rich baseball history, Braves Field briefly served as host for football teams. Braves Field was one of two homes (with Fenway Park) of the Boston Bulldogs of the first American Football League (in 1926) and the Boston Shamrocks of the second AFL (in 1936 and 1937). The National Football League's Pottsville Maroons were sold and relocated to Braves Field in 1929 as the Boston Bulldogs. In 1932, Braves Field became home of the football Boston Braves, a National Football League expansion franchise, owned by George Preston Marshall. The next year, after a 4–4–2 season, the Boston Braves Football franchise moved to Fenway Park and changed its name to the Redskins. In 1937 the franchise relocated and eventually became today's Washington Commanders. Later, the Boston Yanks played a few games at Braves Field when Fenway Park was unavailable.

== Baseball history ==
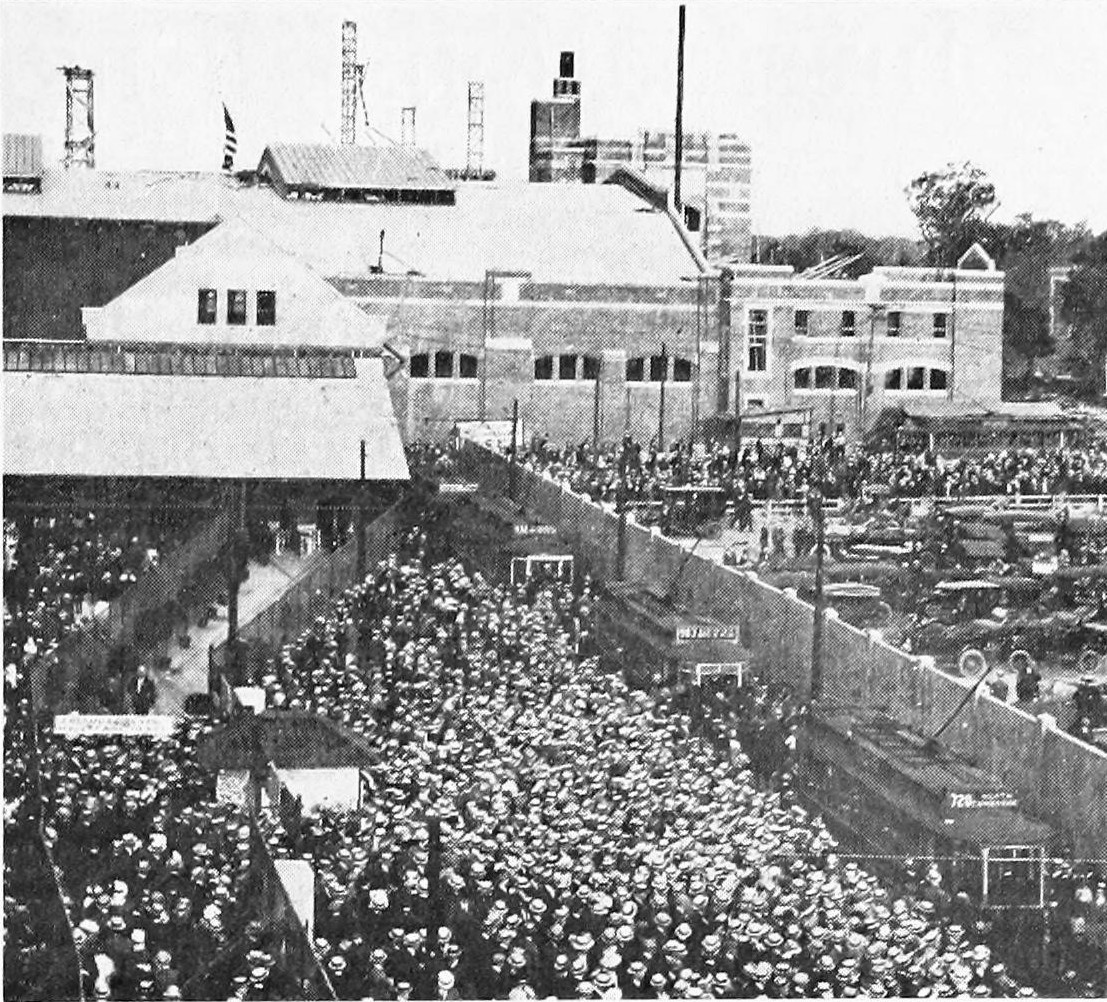
Crowds at the streetcar loop outside the field on August 18, 1915, the first day of baseball in the new park

Before the Braves became the first modern-era franchise to relocate, in 1952, the Boston Braves franchise had been in Boston since 1871. Before Braves Field, the franchise had played at South End Grounds, with play at Congress Street Grounds in 1894 while South End Grounds was rebuilt following the May 15, 1894 Roxbury Fire.

Shortly after the Boston Red Sox opened Fenway Park in 1912, Braves owner James Gaffney purchased the former Allston Golf Club, one mile west of Fenway Park to build a new park for the Braves. Construction of the $600,000 Braves Field began on March 20, 1915, and was completed before the end of the 1915 season. The park was constructed entirely of steel (approx 750 tons) and an estimated 8 million pounds (3,600,000 kg) of concrete. Braves Field officially opened on August 18, 1915, with 46,000 in attendance to see the Braves defeat the St. Louis Cardinals 3–1. In his Opening Day coverage, J. C. O'Leary of The Boston Globe described brand new Braves Field as "the finest ballpark in the world. There is not another like it anywhere, and the probability is that it will stand preeminent for the next 25 years." Braves Park was the largest stadium built in that era, with 40,000 capacity and a trolley system leading to the park.

Braves Field was nicknamed The Wigwam by fans. Later it was nicknamed The Bee Hive and the name changed to National League Park, from 1936 to 1941, a period during which the owners changed the nickname of the team to the Boston Bees. The renaming of the team and stadium were both eventually dropped. During this span, it hosted the fourth Major League Baseball All-Star Game in 1936. With its capacity to hold more fans than Fenway Park, Braves Field was used by the Red Sox in the 1915 and 1916 World Series; with Braves Field still under construction, the Braves had used Fenway Park for their World Series title in 1914.

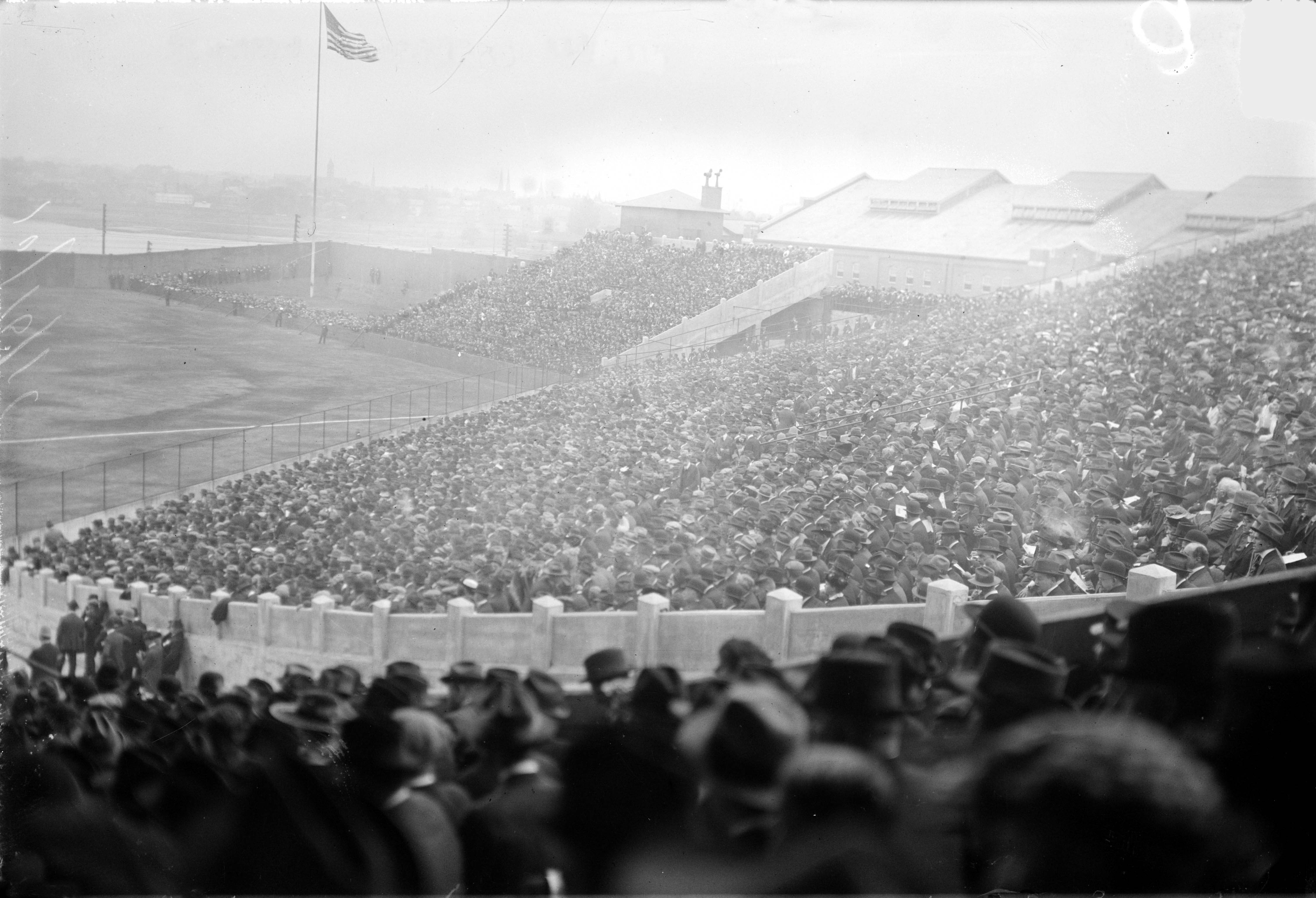
Braves Field during the 1916 World Series

Gaffney wanted to see the game played in a wide open field conducive to allowing numerous inside-the-park home runs. Thus, the stadium was built in what was, at the time, the outskirts of Boston, in a large rectangular plot, contrasting with the cozy and lopsided block containing Fenway Park. The stands were almost entirely in foul territory, leaving little beyond the fence into which players could hit home runs – with the fences over 400 feet (120 m) away down the lines and nearly 500 feet (150 m) to dead center, hitting the ball over the outer fences was all but impossible during the dead-ball era. A stiff breeze coming in from center field across the Charles River further lessened any chances of seeing home runs fly out of the park. The only possible target in the outfield was a small bleacher section, which came to be known as The Jury Box after a sportswriter noticed during one slow mid-week game that there were only twelve individuals sitting in the 2,000-seat stand. Ty Cobb visited the park and commented, "Nobody will ever hit a ball out of this park." The large foul ground area further favored the pitchers.

It took seven years and a livelier ball before a batter hit a home run that cleared the outer wall on the fly. New York Giants catcher Frank Snyder hit the first major league home run in the history of Braves Field in 1922 when he cleared the left field foul pole. Meanwhile, it remained a pitchers' park, perhaps never more so than on May 1, 1920, when Brooklyn Dodgers pitcher Leon Cadore and Braves pitcher Joe Oeschger locked horns for a pair of complete-game performances that went on for a still-record 26 innings. After all that work, the game ended in a 1–1 tie, called on account of darkness.

At the advent of the lively ball era, it became clear that the fans were unhappy with Gaffney's vision of how baseball should be played, and inner fences were built, and regularly moved, being moved in and out based on whims. Later, the ownership of the team even went so far as to shift the entire field in a clockwise direction (towards right field) at one point. One year after opening Braves Field, Gaffney had sold the Braves, but kept Braves Field until his death in 1932, leasing it to the Braves. The Gaffney estate then formed the Commonwealth Realty Trust and leased the park to the Braves until 1949, when Gaffney's heirs sold it back to the Braves for approx. $750,000.

In the midst of the Great Depression, Braves owner Emil Fuchs considered holding greyhound races at Braves Field after games in order to raise revenue. He was forced to back down under vehement opposition from other National League owners, league president Ford Frick, and Commissioner Kenesaw Mountain Landis. However, after Fuchs missed several rent payments, the Commonwealth Realty Trust tried to evict the Braves and turn Braves Field into a dog racing track. The National League ultimately took over the lease and gave the Braves exclusive rights to the stadium.

On Sunday, September 21, 1952, the Brooklyn Dodgers defeated the Braves, 8–2, before 8,822 fans in the final Major League game at Braves Field. Roy Campanella hit the last home run to help Joe Black defeat a Braves team with 20 year-old rookie Eddie Mathews hitting 3rd.

The concourse under the ballpark's remaining seating area still exists almost exactly as it did when the Braves played there.

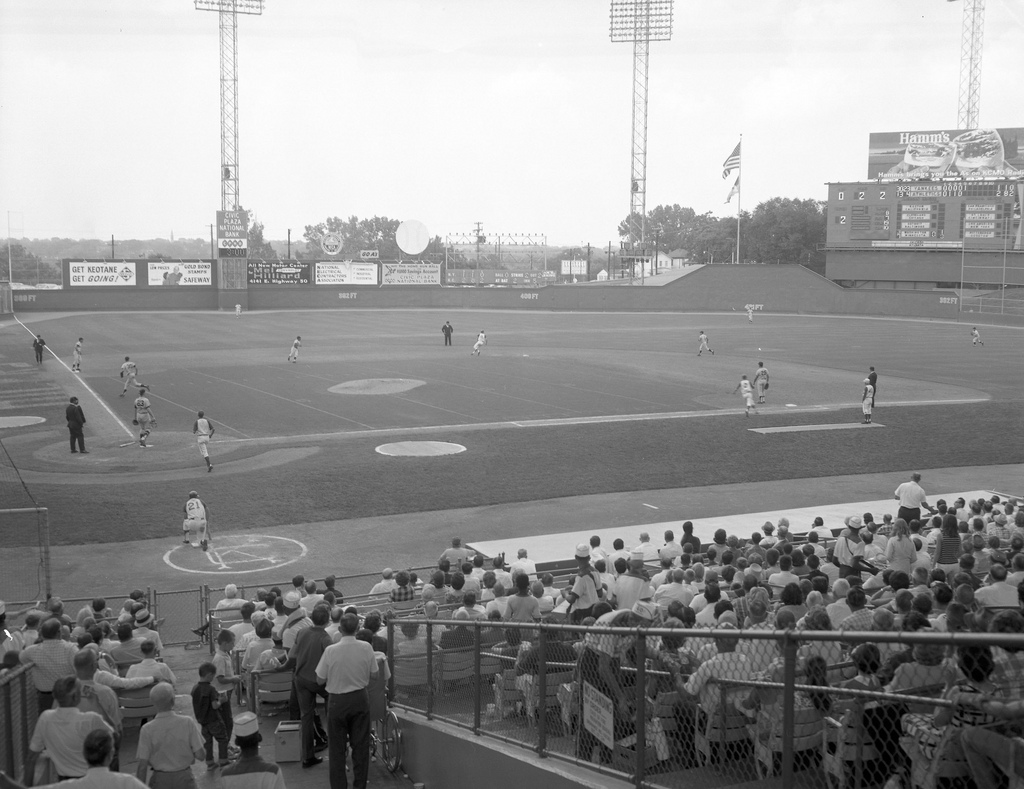
Yankees vs. K.C. Athletics at Municipal Stadium, August 1966. Former Braves Field Scoreboard visible at right

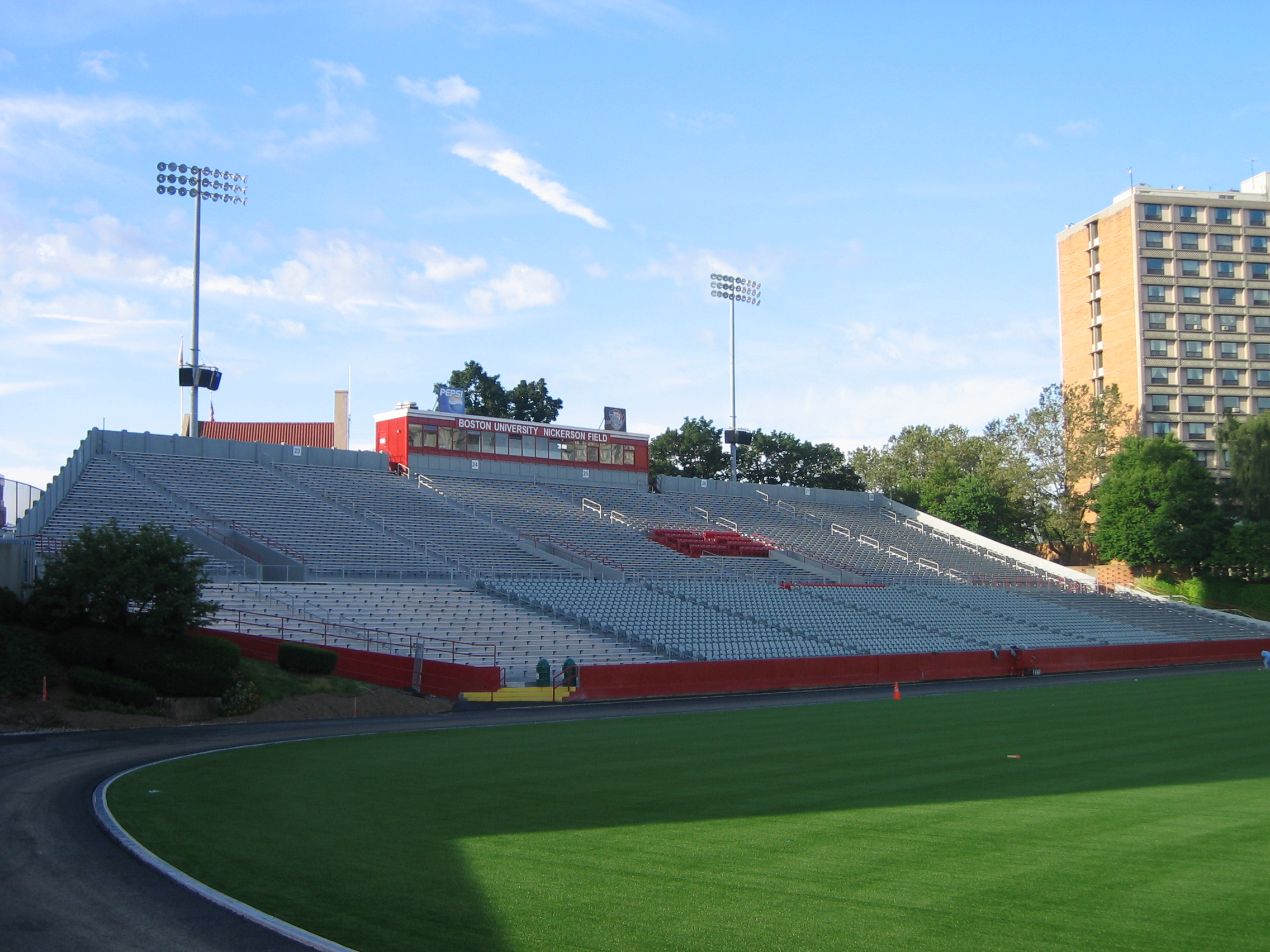
Nickerson Field, 2008, part of old Boston Braves Field

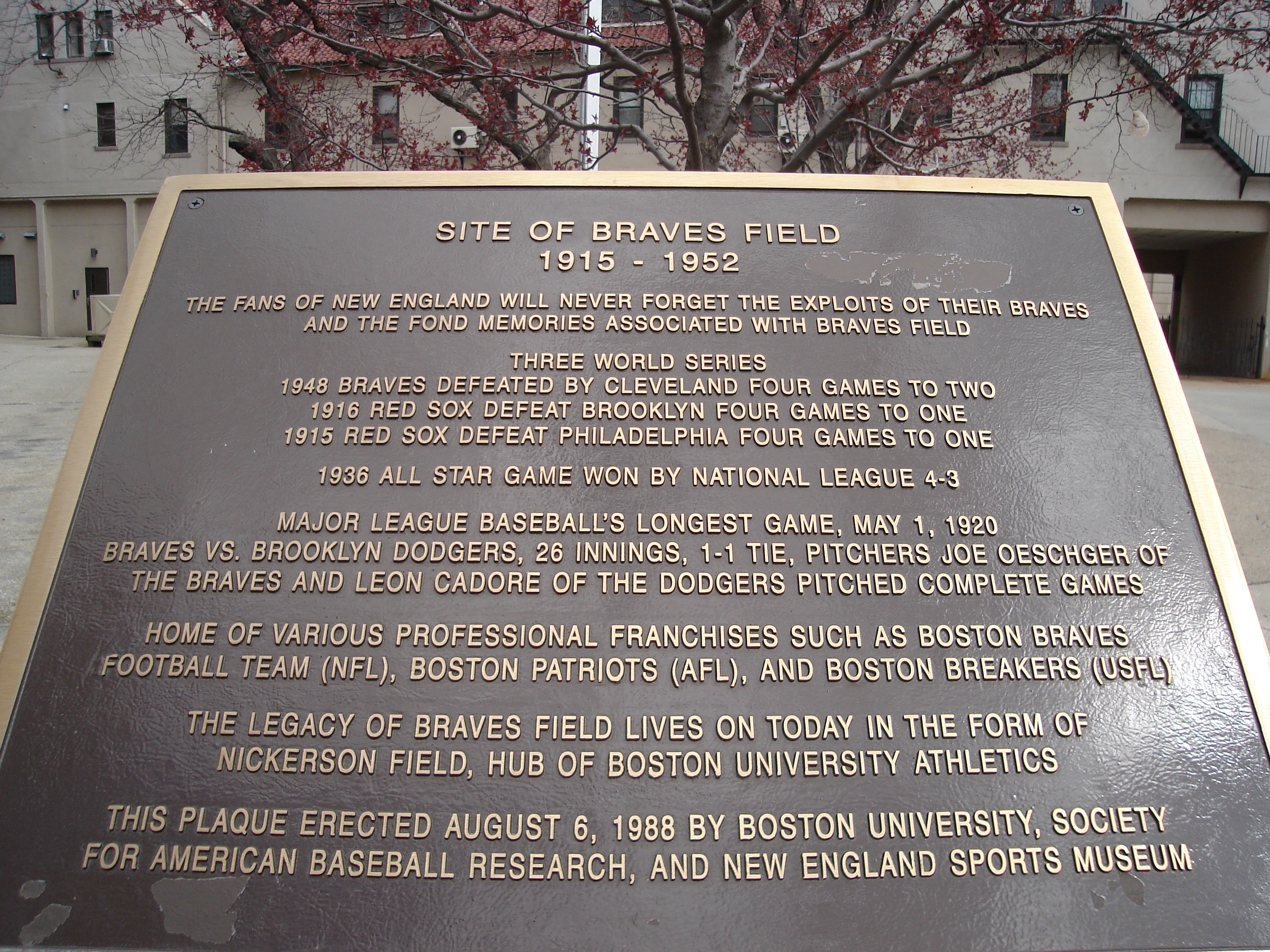
Braves Field plaque

== Closing and renovation ==
After purchasing the Braves from Bob Quinn in 1945, owner Lou Perini, citing low attendance, moved the Braves to Milwaukee just prior to the 1953 season, leaving Braves Field vacant. The Braves had drawn fewer than 300,000 fans in 1952, after drawing over 1 million in 1947, 1948, and 1949. Milwaukee had been the home of a Braves Minor League team called the Brewers since 1902, and the Braves had earlier blocked an attempt by the St. Louis Browns to return to Milwaukee, the Browns' original home. With the Braves gone, Boston University quickly purchased Braves Field on July 30, 1953, renaming it Boston University Field and utilizing it for their student athletes, a usage that remains today. The remaining scoreboard was sold and was moved to Kansas City Municipal Stadium, where it was in use until it was demolished along with the stadium in 1976.

The old ballpark was used as-is until 1955, when Boston University began to reconfigure the stands and the grounds. By 1968, the remodel replaced all but the pavilion grandstand at the end of the right field line, which was retained as the seating core of a football, soccer, field hockey, and track-and-field stadium. The stadium was initially called "Boston University Field" and later renamed Nickerson Field. Along with the pavilion, the original outer wall was retained, though a portion of that wall along what is now Harry Agganis Way was replaced with wrought iron fencing in 2008. The stadium's ticket office was converted into the Boston University police station. The rest of the stadium structure was replaced by dormitories covering the former main grandstand; and the Case Physical Education Center, which houses Walter Brown Arena and Case Gym in the vicinity of what was the left field pavilion along Babcock Street. Of the demolished Jewel Box ballparks, Braves Field has the largest proportion of visible remnants still standing, as no other former ballpark has any portion of its seating still in use.

== World Series games ==
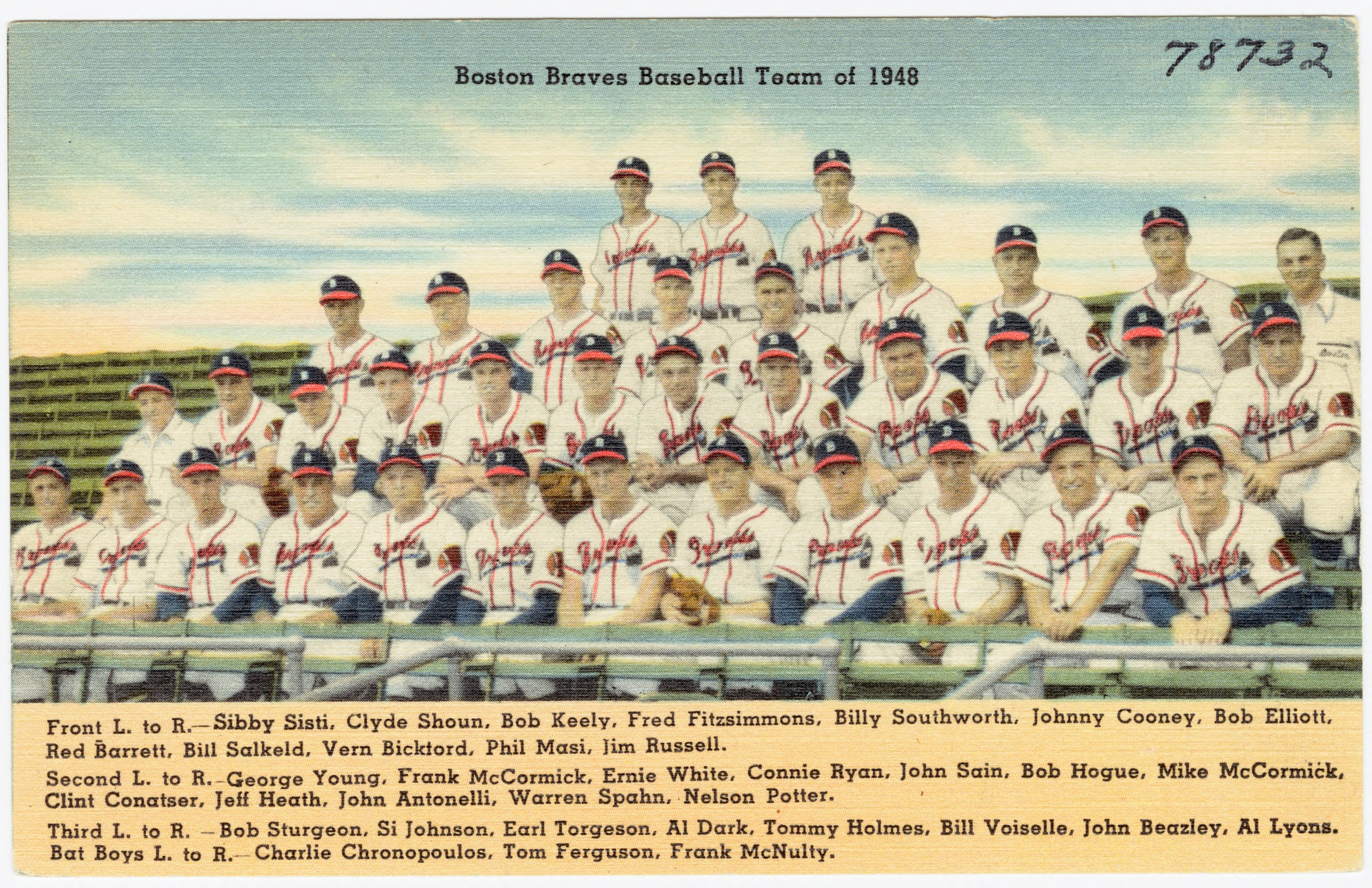
Boston Braves baseball team of 1948

World Series games were played at Braves Field in 1915, 1916, and 1948. The Boston Red Sox played their home games in the 1915 and 1916 World Series at the new Braves Field, as its capacity at the time was larger than Fenway Park, while the Braves hosted three games of the 1948 World Series.

Braves Field diagram, 1916 World Series

The Red Sox defeated the Philadelphia Phillies 4 games to 1 to win the 1915 World Series. On Monday, October 11, the Red Sox won Game 3 at Braves Field, 2–1, in front of 42,300. The next day, the Red Sox won Game 4 in front of 41,096, also 2–1. As a young pitcher on the Red Sox, Babe Ruth only appeared in the series once, as a pinch hitter, going 0–1 in Game 1.

The following year, the Red Sox played the Brooklyn Robins in the 1916 World Series. In Game 1, the Red Sox defeated Brooklyn, 6–5, at Braves Field in front of 36,117. On Monday, October 9, Boston left-hander Babe Ruth pitched against Sherry Smith in front of 47,373. Ruth and Smith dueled for 14 innings, before Ruth and the Red Sox won in the bottom of the 14th, 2–1. The Red Sox won their second consecutive World Series with a 4–1 victory in Game 5 at Braves Field, with 43,620 in attendance.

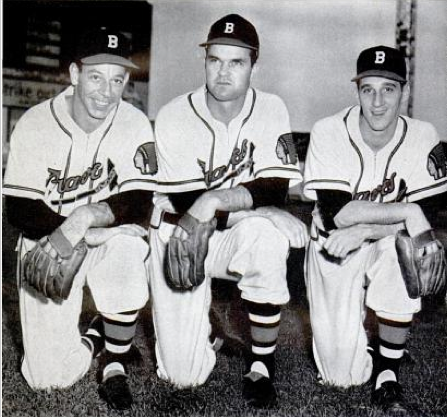
Vern Bickford, Johnny Sain, Warren Spahn

In 1948, the Boston Braves captured the National League pennant with 91 wins. The Braves then played the Cleveland Indians in the World Series, losing 4 games to 2. Two future Hall-of-Famers led their teams as Managers, Lou Boudreau of Indians and Billy Southworth leading the Braves. The 1948 Braves were led by pitchers Johnny Sain and Hall-of-Famer Warren Spahn. In Game 1, on October 6, Sain beat Bob Feller of the Indians, 1–0, at Braves Field in front of 40,135. The Indians took Game 2, 4–1, the next day at Braves Field, with Bob Lemon beating Spahn with 39,633 in attendance. Game 2 also made television history when a live broadcast of the game was shown to passengers of the B&O Railroad's train traveling between Washington, D.C., and New York City. The Braves and Indians returned to Boston for Game 6 on Monday October 11, 1948. The Indians defeated the Braves, 4–3, in front of 40,103 to capture the championship.

== 1936 All-Star Game ==
On July 7, 1936, the 1936 Major League Baseball All-Star Game was played at Braves Field, with 25,566 in attendance. The National League defeated the American League, 4–3, in the 4th All-Star game, featuring over 20 future Major League Baseball Hall of Fame members.

Lefty Grove and Dizzy Dean were the starting pitchers for managers Joe McCarthy of the New York Yankees and Charlie Grimm of the Chicago Cubs. Lou Gehrig hit a home run for the American League, batting behind rookie Joe DiMaggio in the lineup. Among others, Luke Appling, Bill Dickey, Joe Cronin, Schoolboy Rowe, Jimmie Foxx, Rick Ferrell, Earl Averill and Charlie Gehringer were selected for the American League. The National League roster included Billy Herman, Joe Medwick, Gabby Hartnett, Arky Vaughan, Goose Goslin, Leo Durocher, Ernie Lombardi, Mel Ott and Carl Hubbell.

== Longest Major League game ==
On Saturday, May 1, 1920, at Braves Field, the Braves and Brooklyn Robins played 26 complete innings in a game that ended in a 1–1 tie, called due to darkness by home plate umpire Barry McCormick. It is the longest game, by innings, in Major League history. Starting pitchers Leon Cadore (Brooklyn) and Joe Oeschger (Boston) both pitched the entire game in front of 4,500 fans. The 26 innings by both pitchers is also a record, and it is conservatively estimated that each threw at least 300 pitches. Oeschager threw 21 consecutive scoreless innings in the game, Cadore threw 20. Second baseman Charlie Pick of the Braves went 0–11, the worst single day at the plate in MLB history. Cadore faced 95 Braves hitters, while Oeschager faced 90 hitters.

Brooklyn and the Braves met again on Monday, May 3, after an off-day for the Braves. That game lasted another 19 innings, a 2–1 Boston win. In between, on Sunday, May 2, Brooklyn played at home against Philadelphia (a 4–3 Brooklyn win) in a game that went 13 innings. This gave Brooklyn 58 innings played in three days and three games.

== No-hitters ==
There were four no-hitters pitched at Braves Field; none of them was a perfect game;

Date	Pitcher	Team	Score	Opponent	Attendance	Ref.
June 16, 1916	Tom Hughes	Boston Braves	2–0	Pittsburgh Pirates	N/A	
April 27, 1944	Jim Tobin	Boston Braves	2–0	Brooklyn Dodgers	1,447	
August 11, 1950	Vern Bickford	Boston Braves	7–0	Brooklyn Dodgers	29,208	
May 6, 1951†	Cliff Chambers	Pittsburgh Pirates	3–0	Boston Braves	15,492	

† Second game of a doubleheader

== 3-home-run games ==
There were only two three-home-run games at Braves Field:

Date	Player	Team	Score	Opponent	Attendance	Ref.
June 2, 1928	Les Bell†	Boston Braves	12–20	Cincinnati Reds	18,000	
May 13, 1942	Jim Tobin‡	Boston Braves	6–5	Chicago Cubs	3,443	

† Bell also hit a triple.
‡ Tobin was the only modern era (post-1900) pitcher to hit three home runs in one game, until Shohei Ohtani accomplished the feat in the 2025 NLCS.

== Dimensions ==
As noted above, the fences were moved repeatedly throughout the ballpark's existence, sometimes within a given season.

Year(s)	Left	Left-center	Center	Right-center	Right
1915–1920	402'	402' 6" (1915); 396' (1916)	440'	402'	402' (1915); 375' (1916)
1921–1927	375' (1921); 404' (1922); 403' (1926)	402' 5" (1921); 404 (1922); 402' 6" (1926)	440'	402'	365'
1928–29	353' 6"	330' (April 1928); 359' (July 1928)	387' (April 1928); 417' (July 1928); 387' 2" (1929)	402'	364' (1928); 297' 9" (1929)
1930	340'	359'	394' 6"	402'	297' 9"
1931–32	353' 8"	359'	387' 3"	402'	297' 11"
1933–1935	359' (1933); 353' 8" (1934)	359'	417'	402'	364'
1936–1939	368'	359'	426' (1936); 407' (1937); 408' (1939)	402'	297' (1936); 376' (1937); 378' (1938)
1940–41	350' (1940); 337' (1941)	359'	385' (1940); 401' (1941)	402'	350'
1942	334'	365'	375'	362'	350'
1943	340'	355'	370'	355'	340' (April 1943); 320' (July 1943)
1944–45	337'	355'	390' (1944); 380' (1945)	355'	340' (April 1944); 320' (May 1944)
1946–1952	337'	355'	370' (1946); 390' (1947)	355'	320' (1946); 320' (1947); 319' (1948)

Center field at the flag pole: 520'
Deepest center field corner: 550' (1915), 401' (1942), 390' (1943)
Backstop: 75' (1915), 60' (1936)

== Seating capacity ==
Years	Capacity
1915–1927	40,000
1928–1936	46,500
1937–1938	41,700
1939–1940	45,000
1941–1946	37,746
1947	36,706
1948–1954	37,106

== Sources ==
- Lost Ballparks, by Lawrence Ritter
- Green Cathedrals, by Phil Lowry
- Ballparks of North America, by Michael Benson
- Baseball Uniforms of the 20th Century, by Marc Okkonen

Events and tenants
Preceded by Fenway Park	Home of the Boston Braves; 1915–1952	Succeeded by Milwaukee County Stadium
Preceded by first stadium	Home of the Boston Redskins; 1932	Succeeded by Fenway Park
Preceded by Cleveland Stadium	Host of the All-Star Game; 1936	Succeeded by Griffith Stadium
