= Game score =

Baseball statistic

Game score is a metric devised by Bill James as a rough overall gauge of a starting pitcher's performance in a baseball game. It is designed such that scores tend to range from 0–100, with an average performance being around 50 points.

== Formula ==
To determine a starting pitcher's game score:

- Start with 50 points.
- Add one point for each out recorded, so three points for every complete inning pitched.
- Add two points for each inning completed after the fourth.
- Add one point for each strikeout.
- Subtract two points for each hit allowed.
- Subtract four points for each earned run allowed.
- Subtract two points for each unearned run allowed.
- Subtract one point for each walk.

== History ==
James first introduced game score in the 1988 edition of his Baseball Abstract. He called it "a kind of garbage stat that I present not because it helps us understand anything in particular but because it is fun to play around with."

=== Other versions ===
James has noted that there are cases in which his original version of game score does not accurately reflect a pitcher's performance.

In a September 2003 article in Baseball Prospectus, Dayn Perry created an updated formula based on the ideas behind defense-independent pitching statistics, named Game Score 2.0.

In December 2014, statistician Tom Tango made another attempt at updating the formula, which he also called "Game Score Version 2.0". This version applies a base of 40 points to starting pitchers' game scores (instead of 50), adjusts the point values of certain in-game events, and introduces a penalty for giving up home runs into the equation. Game Score Version 2.0 is the variant displayed on MLB.com. According to James, the original version of game score correlates more closely with team winning percentage and ERA than Tango's version.

== Highest achieved scores ==
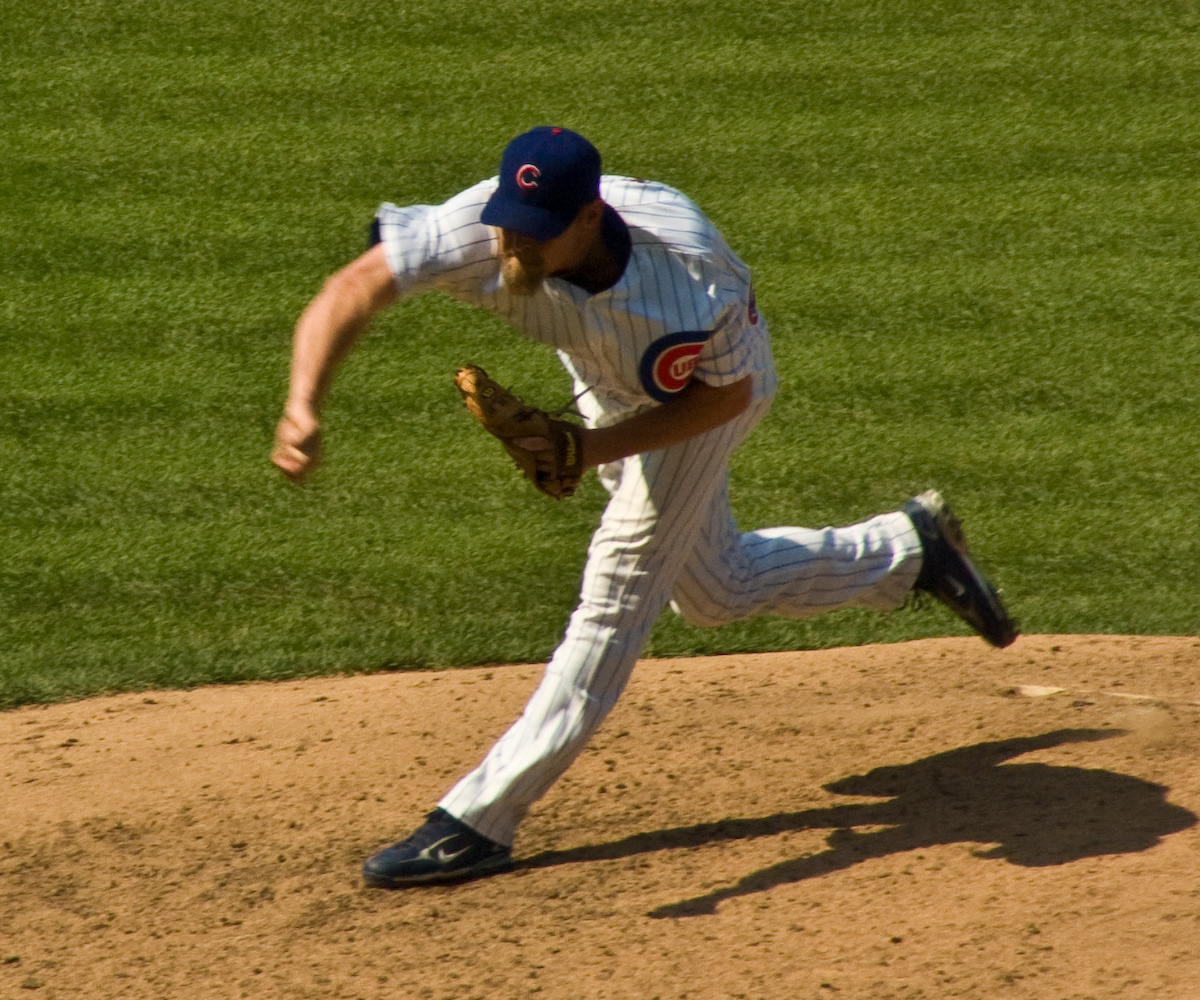
Kerry Wood

The highest game score for a nine-inning game in the major leagues is 105, achieved by Kerry Wood for the Chicago Cubs against the Houston Astros on May 6, 1998, in just his fifth major league start. Wood's performance included 20 strikeouts, zero walks, a hit batter and just one hit.

The second highest nine-inning game score is 104, which occurred on October 3, 2015, when Max Scherzer of the Washington Nationals allowed no hits and no walks, striking out 17, against the New York Mets. This is also the highest game score ever for a major league no-hitter.

The 100th game score of 100 points or higher was pitched by Matt Cain for his perfect game on June 13, 2012. Of the 100 such games, only ten of them were a regulation nine innings.

The two highest game scores ever recorded both occurred in the same game: the famous 26-inning duel from 1920 in which Joe Oeschger scored 153 and Leon Cadore scored 140. Oeschger had earlier scored a 102 in a 14-inning game in 1917 against Jeff Pfeffer, who scored 114. Each game ended in a tie after being called due to darkness.

In all, there have been nine games in which both starting pitchers scored 100 points; all required extra innings and none has occurred since 1971. Juan Marichal and Warren Spahn scored 112 and 97, respectively, during a complete game 16-inning match up on July 2, 1963; Spahn's score fell below 100 because of Willie Mays' game-winning home run in the bottom of the 16th.

Twenty-one pitchers with 100 or more game score points did so in losing games, including Harvey Haddix, who scored a 107 in the game in which he took a perfect game into the 13th inning. The highest-ever losing game score was 118, from Art Nehf, who outlasted the opposing starter by six innings but lost in the 21st inning. Seventeen of the 100+ game scores came in suspended tie games. Only seven of the 100 highest game scores were no-hitters.

Walter Johnson and Nolan Ryan had the most 100-point game scores with four apiece. Johnson had two in 1918, one in 1919, and a fourth in 1926; Ryan's came in 1972, 1973, 1990 and 1991. Warren Spahn had three 100-point game scores, in 1948, 1952 and 1960. Juan Marichal had three 100-point game scores, in 1963, 1966 and 1969. Eight pitchers had two 100-point game scores: Art Nehf (1917 and 1918), Joe Oeschger (1917 and 1920), Burleigh Grimes (1918 and 1920), Eric Erickson (1918 and 1921), Herb Pennock (1923 and 1925), Jim Maloney (1964 and 1965), Frank Tanana (1975 and 1976), and Max Scherzer (both 2015).

Corey Kluber's game score of 98 in an eight-inning, no-run, one-hit, no-walk, 18-strikeout performance against the St. Louis Cardinals on May 13, 2015, is the highest by any pitcher in MLB history in a non-complete game. Indians bench coach Brad Mills removed him after the eighth inning, and Cody Allen pitched the ninth inning to seal a 2–0 win. The previous holder of the record was Matt Harvey, who achieved a game score of 97 for a nine-inning non-complete game against the Chicago White Sox on May 7, 2013. (Harvey's New York Mets won in ten innings.)

On June 18, 2014, Clayton Kershaw posted the second highest ever game score for a nine-inning, no-hit effort. Kershaw struck out 15 while walking none, and the only baserunner was the result of a throwing error. His game score of 102 is the third-highest for a nine-inning game in MLB history (50 + 27 + 10 + 15).

The lowest game score in baseball's modern era was Allan Travers' 26-hit, 24-run start for the Detroit Tigers on May 18, 1912. His game score was −52. This performance only came about because the regular Tiger players staged a strike in protest of Ty Cobb's suspension. To avoid a forfeit, local college players (including Travers) were enlisted as impromptu fill-ins. The lowest game score since 1957 was Oakland pitcher Mike Oquist's, who allowed 16 hits and 14 earned runs in five innings on August 3, 1998, for a −21.

In terms of high scores, the system favors current pitchers in some ways. It is difficult to achieve a very high score in a game without amassing a substantial number of strikeouts. In earlier eras, even for the very best pitchers, strikeouts were less plentiful. For instance, Cy Young's two no-hitters earned scores of just 90 and 88 due to their low strikeout totals (three and two, respectively). However, most of the all-time high game scores occurred in baseball's earlier era, when starting pitchers were permitted to remain in games longer than today; four of the top six all-time game scores were accomplished in stints of 21 innings or more.

The highest game score in a nine-inning game in Nippon Professional Baseball history is 106, which Rōki Sasaki achieved on April 10, 2022 by pitching a perfect game with a league record-tying 19 strikeouts. This game score is higher than any achieved in a nine-inning game in MLB history.

== Game scores of 100 in a 9-inning MLB game ==
Seventeen times in Major League Baseball history, a pitcher has achieved a game score of 100 or higher in a 9-inning game, as detailed here.

Pitcher	Team	Opposing team	Date	Game result	Game score	Line			Notes
Pitcher	Team	Opposing team	Date	Game result	Game score	H	BB	K	Notes
Nap Rucker	Brooklyn Superbas	Boston Doves	September 5, 1908	W 6-0	101	0	0	14	No-hitter
Warren Spahn	Milwaukee Braves	Philadelphia Phillies	September 16, 1960	W 4–0	100	0	2	15	No-hitter
Sandy Koufax	Los Angeles Dodgers	Chicago Cubs	September 9, 1965	W 1–0	101	0	0	14	Perfect game See also: Sandy Koufax's perfect game
Nolan Ryan	California Angels	Boston Red Sox	July 9, 1972	W 3–0	100	1	2	17	
Nolan Ryan	California Angels	Detroit Tigers	July 15, 1973	W 6–0	100	0	4	17	No-hitter
Nolan Ryan	Texas Rangers	Toronto Blue Jays	May 1, 1991	W 3–0	101	0	2	16	No-hitter; Ryan's seventh and final no-hitter, a Major League Baseball record.
Kerry Wood	Chicago Cubs	Houston Astros	May 6, 1998	W 2–0	105	1	0	20	Highest Game Score in a 9-inning game. Tied for the Major League Baseball record for most strikeouts in a 9-inning game.
Curt Schilling	Arizona Diamondbacks	Milwaukee Brewers	April 7, 2002	W 2–0	100	1	2	17	
Randy Johnson	Arizona Diamondbacks	Atlanta Braves	May 18, 2004	W 2–0	100	0	0	13	Perfect game See also: Randy Johnson's perfect game
Brandon Morrow	Toronto Blue Jays	Tampa Bay Rays	August 8, 2010	W 1–0	100	1	2	17	
Matt Cain	San Francisco Giants	Houston Astros	June 13, 2012	W 10–0	101	0	0	14	Perfect game See also: Matt Cain's perfect game
Clayton Kershaw	Los Angeles Dodgers	Colorado Rockies	June 18, 2014	W 8–0	102	0	0	15	No-hitter; Only batter to reach base was on a fielding error.
Max Scherzer	Washington Nationals	Milwaukee Brewers	June 14, 2015	W 4–0	100	1	1	16	
Max Scherzer	Washington Nationals	New York Mets	October 3, 2015	W 2–0	104	0	0	17	No-hitter; highest game score achieved in a no-hitter. Only batter to reach base was on a throwing error in 6th inning. First occurrence of two 100-score games in a season by a pitcher.
Gerrit Cole	Houston Astros	Arizona Diamondbacks	May 4, 2018	W 8–0	100	1	1	16	Cole's first career shutout
Justin Verlander	Houston Astros	Toronto Blue Jays	September 1, 2019	W 2–0	100	0	1	14	No-hitter
Jacob Misiorowski	Milwaukee Brewers	Philadelphia Phillies	June 12, 2026	W 6–0	100	1	0	15	Maddux, complete game shut out

== Career totals for some pitchers ==
The total number of game scores listed for each pitcher are starts in which he reached 90 points or higher. The parenthetical totals represent the highest score in the pitcher's career, and the number of game scores equal to or greater than 100 (if any). This is not a complete list and includes only pitchers with five or more games of 90 or higher (through 2/22/2024).

- Nolan Ryan 31 (101, 4)
- Randy Johnson 20 (100, 1)
- Sandy Koufax 18 (101, 1)
- Tom Seaver 16 (106, 1)
- Bob Gibson 14 (100, 1)
- Gaylord Perry 13 (112, 1)
- Roger Clemens 13 (99)
- Jim Maloney 12 (106, 2)
- Pedro Martínez 12 (98)
- Sam McDowell 11 (100, 1)
- Steve Carlton 11 (98)
- Bert Blyleven 11 (97)
- Jim Bunning 10 (97)
- Bob Feller 10
- Walter Johnson 10
- Warren Spahn 9 (102, 3)
- Mike Mussina 9 (98)
- Clayton Kershaw 9 (102, 1)
- Dean Chance 8 (116, 3)
- Carl Hubbell 8
- Juan Marichal 8 (112, 3)
- Dennis Eckersley 8 (98)
- Justin Verlander 8 (100, 1)
- Mickey Lolich 8 (92)
- Frank Tanana 7 (105, 2)
- Bill Singer 7 (97)
- Joe Coleman 7 (93)
- Johnny Vander Meer 7
- Dazzy Vance 7
- Billy Pierce 7 (100, 1)
- Hal Newhouser 7 (92)
- Madison Bumgarner 6 (98)
- Virgil Trucks 6 (103, 1)
- Curt Schilling 6 (100, 1)
- Don Drysdale 6 (100, 1)
- David Cone 6 (99)
- Hideo Nomo 6 (99)
- Don Sutton 6 (98)
- Mike Scott 6 (98)
- Roy Halladay 6 (98)
- Bob Veale 6 (97)
- Jerry Koosman 6 (97)
- Chris Carpenter 6 (94)
- John Smoltz 6 (93)
- Juan Pizarro 6 (92)
- Chris Sale 6 (93)
- Mike Cuellar 5 (101, 1)
- Gary Peters 5 (98)
- Jason Schmidt 5 (97)
- Robin Roberts 5 (96)
- Curt Simmons 5 (95)
- Ray Culp 5 (95)
- Ron Guidry 5 (95)
- Aníbal Sánchez 5 (94)
- Ferguson Jenkins 5 (94)
- Kevin Brown 5 (94)
- Milt Pappas 5 (94)
- Dwight Gooden 5 (93)
- Jim Palmer 5 (93)
- Camilo Pascual 5 (92)
- Dave Stieb 5 (92)
- Pete Harnisch 5 (92)
- James Shields 5 (94)
- Allie Reynolds 5 (92)
- Dolf Luque 5
- Bullet Joe Bush 5
- Grover Cleveland Alexander 5

== Theoretical maximum scores ==
The maximum possible game score in a nine-inning game while allowing no baserunners is 114, possible only if a pitcher goes nine innings while striking out every batter he faces and facing three batters per inning. The pitcher receives 50 to begin with, and loses no points because there are no hits, walks, or runs of any kind. He receives 27 points for the 27 outs, and 10 points for five innings completed after the fourth inning, for a total of 87. In this "perfect score" scenario, the pitcher would have to strike out every hitter he faced, netting him an additional 27 points, for a grand total of 114.

The absolute maximum possible score requires the extremely unlikely scenario in which three base runners reach base each inning on wild pitches or passed balls on dropped third strikes. If this were to happen such that no one scored, and the pitcher recorded all outs by strikeout, a pitcher could theoretically record six strikeouts per inning, and thus 54 for the game, netting him 54 points in addition to the 87 he would have received as described above, for a total of 141 in a 9 inning game. Six strikeouts in an inning is not a theoretical maximum, but beyond six batters, runs would inevitably start scoring, hurting the game score more than any additional strikeouts could help. Given that a pitcher could theoretically pitch every inning of a 0-0 game, and game could theoretically extend indefinitely at that 0-0 score, there is no true limit to potential game score.

The fantastic improbability of this can be illustrated by the fact that there has never, in the entire 150+-year history of major league baseball, been one single instance of a six-strikeout inning -- or even a five-strikeout inning. A four-strikeout inning occurs rarely, and has happened on just under 100 occasions.
