= Bob Hart (umpire) =

American baseball umpire (1879–1937)

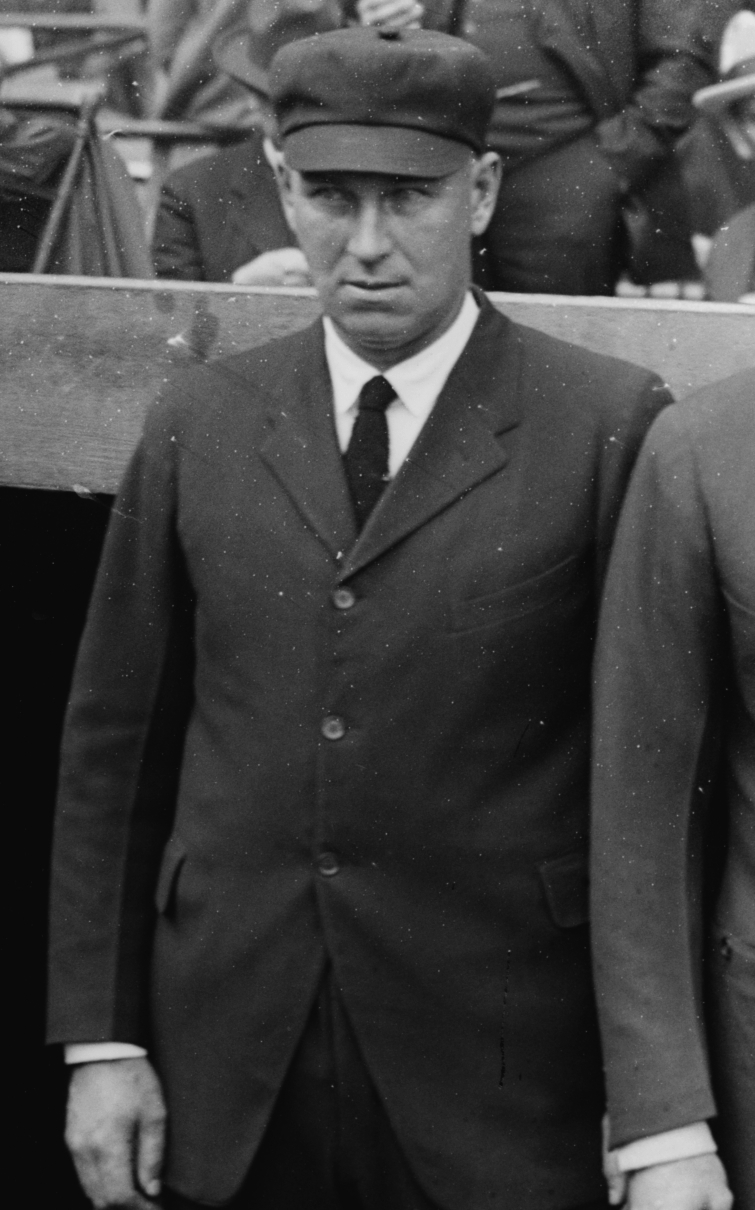
- Hart at the 1923 World Series.
- Born: November 22, 1879; Kensington, Connecticut, U.S.
- Died: May 10, 1937 (aged 57); Lowell, Massachusetts, U.S.
- Occupation: Major League Baseball umpire
- Height: 5 ft 11 in (180 cm)
- Spouse: Margaret (née McDermott)

Eugene Francis "Bob" Hart (November 22, 1879 – May 10, 1937) was an American umpire in Major League Baseball.

== Early life and career ==
Born in Kensington, Connecticut, Hart was the son of Mary (née Hannon) and John Hart. Around the turn of the century, Hart entered the National Roller Polo League and won two pennants for the Lowell, Massachusetts team. He then played outfield for various Minor League Baseball teams in the early 1900s.

== Umpiring career ==
Hart began his career as an umpire in the Maine State League. Hart began umpiring in the American League on April 11, 1912, and worked in the AL until June 1913. He then worked in the International League and American Association before being named a National League umpire in 1920, where he worked until his retirement in 1929. Hart umpired all six games of the 1923 World Series.

He officiated in the May 1, 1920 game in which Leon Cadore and Joe Oeschger pitched all 26 innings for their teams. The game was called a tie due to darkness.

== Later life ==
Hart later became active in town politics; he served three years as Lowell town assessor in the 1930s, and was a member of the Lowell Council. He died of a heart attack at his home on May 10, 1937. He was buried at St. Patrick Cemetery in Lowell.

== See also ==
- List of Major League Baseball umpires (disambiguation)
