= Ira Townsend =

American baseball player (1894-1965)

Ian Townsend
- Pitcher
- Born: January 9, 1894; Weimar, Texas, U.S.
- Died: July 21, 1965 (aged 71); Schulenburg, Texas, U.S.
- Batted: Right Threw: Right

MLB debut
- August 25, 1920, for the Boston Braves

Last MLB appearance
- September 28, 1921, for the Boston Braves

MLB statistics
- Win–loss record: 0–0
- Strikeouts: 1
- Earned run average: 3.86
- Stats at Baseball Reference

Teams
- Boston Braves (1920–1921)

Ira Dance "Pat" Townsend (January 9, 1894 – July 21, 1965) was an American Major League Baseball pitcher. He played two seasons with the Boston Braves from 1920 to 1921.
