= John Sullivan (outfielder) =

American baseball player (1890–1966)

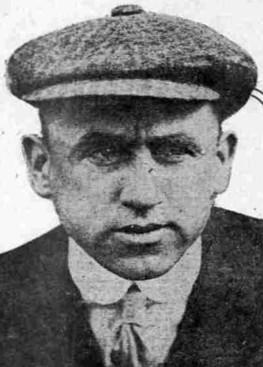
- Outfielder / First baseman
- Born: March 21, 1890; Williamsport, Pennsylvania, U.S.
- Died: April 1, 1966 (aged 76); Milton, Pennsylvania, U.S.
- Batted: Right Threw: Right

MLB debut
- April 18, 1920, for the Boston Braves

Last MLB appearance
- October 2, 1921, for the Chicago Cubs

MLB statistics
- Batting average: .309
- Home runs: 5
- Runs batted in: 69
- Stats at Baseball Reference

Teams
- Boston Braves (1920 – 1921); Chicago Cubs (1921)

John Lawrence Sullivan (March 21, 1890 – April 1, 1966) was an American Major League Baseball player. He played two seasons with the Boston Braves from (1920–1921) and Chicago Cubs (1921).
