= Cy Morgan (1920s pitcher) =

American baseball player (1895-1946)

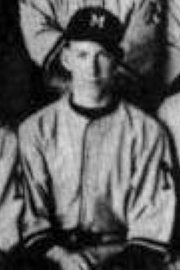
- Pitcher
- Born: November 11, 1895; Lakeville, Massachusetts, U.S.
- Died: September 11, 1946 (aged 50); Lakeville, Massachusetts, U.S.
- Batted: Right Threw: Right

MLB debut
- June 8, 1921, for the Boston Braves

Last MLB appearance
- May 1, 1922, for the Boston Braves

MLB statistics
- Win–loss record: 1-1
- Earned run average: 7.38
- Strikeouts: 8
- Stats at Baseball Reference

Teams
- Boston Braves (1921–1922)

Cyril Arlon "Cy" Morgan (November 11, 1895 – September 11, 1946) was an American Major League Baseball pitcher who played in 1921 and 1922 with the Boston Braves. He was born in Lakeville, Massachusetts, to his parents, Joseph and Helen Morgan. Morgan never played the game as a child or in high school. The first record of his ever playing was in 1915 pitching for the Middleboro Athletic Club. In his first four years of playing baseball, Morgan averaged about 14 strikeouts per game.
