= Charlie Pick =

American baseball player (1888–1954)

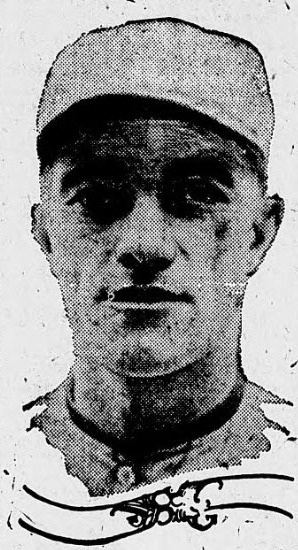
- Second baseman / Third baseman
- Born: April 12, 1888; Brookneal, Virginia, U.S.
- Died: June 26, 1954 (aged 66); Lynchburg, Virginia, U.S.
- Batted: Left Threw: Right

MLB debut
- September 20, 1914, for the Washington Senators

Last MLB appearance
- August 13, 1920, for the Boston Braves

MLB statistics
- Batting average: .261
- Home runs: 3
- Runs batted in: 86
- Stats at Baseball Reference

Teams
- Washington Senators (1914–1915); Philadelphia Athletics (1916); Chicago Cubs (1918–1919); Boston Braves (1919–1920)

Charles Thomas Pick (April 10, 1888 – June 26, 1954) was an American professional baseball player who played second base in the Major Leagues from 1914 to 1920 for the Chicago Cubs, Washington Senators, Philadelphia Athletics, and Boston Braves. He was later the manager of the Sacramento Senators of the Pacific Coast League from 1922–1924.

Game 3 of the 1918 World Series came to an end with Pick being caught in a rundown between third base and home plate, failing to score on a passed ball, in a 2–1 Chicago loss to the Boston Red Sox. Pick went on to bat .389 for the Series, leading the Cubs in hits.

Charlie Pick is one of fourteen players in major league history to record eleven at bats in a single game. On May 1, 1920, he became the only player to record eleven at bats in a game without getting a hit. Playing for the Braves in a 26-inning 1–1 tie against the Brooklyn Robins, Pick set a single-game record for batting futility that has not since been equaled by going 0 for 11. Adding to his frustrations at the plate that day, he also committed two errors at second base.
