= Joe Oeschger =

American baseball player (1892–1986)

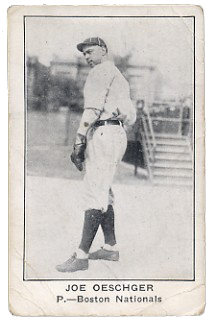
- 1922 baseball card of Oeschger
- Pitcher
- Born: May 24, 1892; Chicago, Illinois, U.S.
- Died: July 28, 1986 (aged 94); Rohnert Park, California, U.S.
- Batted: Right Threw: Right

MLB debut
- April 21, 1914, for the Philadelphia Phillies

Last MLB appearance
- September 6, 1925, for the Brooklyn Robins

MLB statistics
- Win–loss record: 82–116
- Earned run average: 3.81
- Strikeouts: 535
- Stats at Baseball Reference

Teams
- Philadelphia Phillies (1914–1919); New York Giants (1919); Boston Braves (1919–1923); New York Giants (1924); Philadelphia Phillies (1924); Brooklyn Robins (1925)

Career highlights and awards
- MLB records: Most innings pitched in a game (tied with Leon Cadore): 26

Joseph Carl Oeschger (May 24, 1892 – July 28, 1986) was an American pitcher in Major League Baseball. He played for the Philadelphia Phillies, New York Giants, Boston Braves, and Brooklyn Robins from 1914 to 1925.

Oeschger is best known for holding the Major League Baseball (MLB) record for the most innings pitched in a single game. In 1920, both Oeschger and Leon Cadore pitched 26 innings for their respective teams in a game that was eventually called a tie due to darkness. Oeschger also set the record for game score in the same game, with a score of 153; Cadore posted the second-highest game score ever in that game, at 140.

After his baseball career ended, Oeschger was a teacher for the San Francisco Board of Education for 27 years.

== Early life ==
Oeschger was born in Chicago, one of six children of immigrants from Switzerland. In 1900 his family moved to Ferndale, California, where Joe's father bought 100 acres (0.40 km^{2}) of land and established a dairy ranch. Joe and his three brothers all attended Ferndale High School, where they played baseball. After high school, Joe attended and played baseball at Saint Mary's College of California, graduating in 1914, seven years after fellow major leaguer Harry Hooper.

== MLB career ==
=== Early career ===
Oeschger began his MLB career with the Philadelphia Phillies in the 1914 season. He won four games, while losing eight, and posting a 3.77 earned run average. He pitched in a handful of games during the 1915 and 1916 seasons before becoming a full-time starter in 1917. That season he had 15 wins against 14 losses and a 2.75 earned run average. Oeschger then led the league in losses during the 1918 season with 18 and had an earned run average of 3.03. One of the few highlights of his season was his shutout against the Brooklyn Robins on April 22. He also tied for the league lead in saves, with three. On May 27, 1919, Oeschger was traded from the Phillies to the New York Giants for Ed Sicking and George Smith. He only pitched in five games for the Giants before being included in a trade to the Braves for Art Nehf.

=== Longest game ===
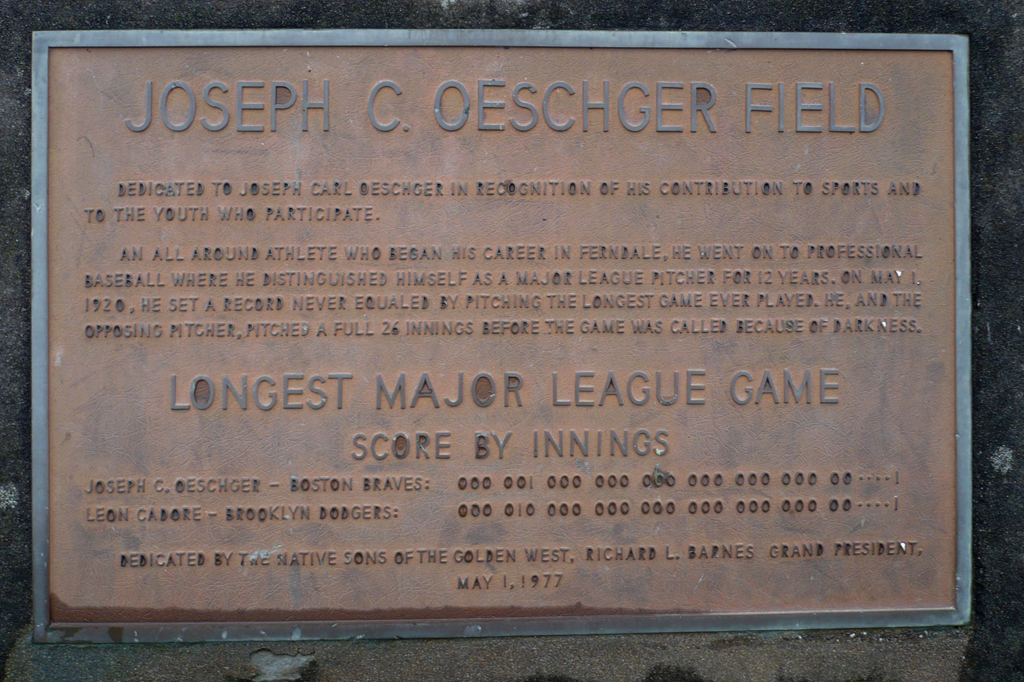
A baseball field is named for Oeschger in Ferndale, California. The plaque commemorates the longest game of baseball ever played.

On May 1, 1920, the Braves and Robins played at Boston in front of a crowd of 4500 spectators. Oeschger started for the Braves, and Leon Cadore started for the Robins. The game was held scoreless until the top of the fifth inning, when Ernie Krueger scored on an Ivy Olson single. In the sixth inning Walton Cruise tripled, then scored on a Tony Boeckel single. The game was eventually ruled a tie after 26 innings because of darkness. Oescheger only gave up 9 hits the entire game, while Cadore allowed 15. Oeschger had one hit in nine trips to the plate, a double. If they had played one more inning the pitchers would have played the equivalent of three games.

For the rest of the 1920 season Oescheger won 15 games with a 3.46 earned run average.

=== Later career ===
On September 8, 1921, Oeschger became the fourth pitcher in major league history to throw an immaculate inning, striking out all three batters on a total of nine pitches in the fourth inning of a game against the Philadelphia Phillies. He had his only 20-win season that year, which was the third-best in the National League. He also had a lack of control, leading the league in walks with 97, and hit by pitches with 10.

Oeschger then collapsed the next two seasons, having a combined total of 36 losses with only 11 wins, and an earned run average over 5.

On November 11, 1923, Oeschger and Billy Southworth were traded from Boston to the New York Giants for Dave Bancroft and Casey Stengel. Oeschger played for the Giants and Phillies in 1924, and he finished his MLB career with the Robins in 1925. For his career he had 83 wins and 116 defeats and never appeared in a World Series.

== Later life ==
Oeschger later moved to San Francisco, where he taught physical education for the San Francisco Board of Education for 27 years. Throughout his life, Oeschger continued to receive autograph requests for pitching the 26-inning game. He had copies of the box score made and sent them out with his signature. He was invited to throw out the first pitch of game three of the 1983 World Series that pitted the Philadelphia Phillies against the Baltimore Orioles. He died in Rohnert Park, California, at age 94.

== See also ==
- List of Major League Baseball annual shutout leaders
- List of Major League Baseball annual saves leaders
