= Barry McCormick =

American baseball player and umpire (1874–1956)

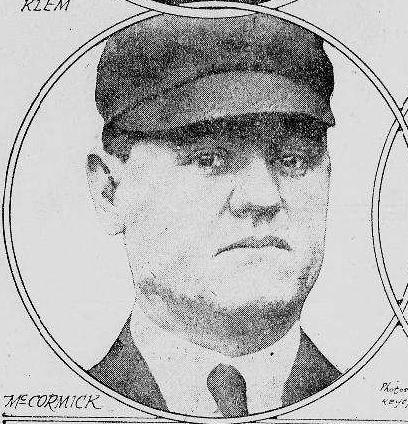
- Infielder / Umpire
- Born: December 25, 1874; Maysville, Kentucky, U.S.
- Died: January 28, 1956 (aged 81); Cincinnati, Ohio, U.S.
- Batted: Right Threw: Right

MLB debut
- September 25, 1895, for the Louisville Colonels

Last MLB appearance
- August 30, 1904, for the Washington Senators

MLB statistics
- Batting average: .238
- Home runs: 15
- Runs batted in: 417
- Stats at Baseball Reference

Teams
- Louisville Colonels (1895); Chicago Colts/Orphans (1896–1901); St. Louis Browns (1902–1903); Washington Senators (1903–1904)

William Joseph "Barry" McCormick (December 25, 1874 – January 28, 1956) was an American professional baseball player and later a Major League umpire.

As a player, he played infield in Major League Baseball from 1895 to 1904. He would play for the Louisville Colonels, Chicago Colts/Orphans, St. Louis Browns, and Washington Senators. McCormick was the last player to have eight at-bats in a nine-inning game, achieving this feat on the June 29, 1897.

After retiring as a player, he took up umpiring, making his Major League debut in 1917 and winding up his second career in 1929. He was behind the plate for the longest extra inning game in Major League history, the 26-inning contest between the Brooklyn Dodgers and Boston Braves on May 1, 1920.

== See also ==
- List of Major League Baseball single-game hits leaders
