= Leon Cadore =

American baseball player (1891–1958)

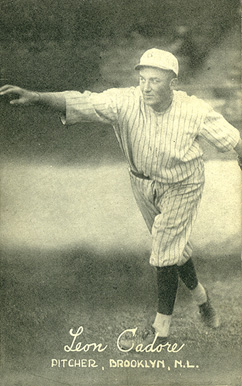
- 1922 baseball card of Cadore
- Pitcher
- Born: November 20, 1891; Chicago, Illinois, U.S.
- Died: March 16, 1958 (aged 66); Spokane, Washington, U.S.
- Batted: Right Threw: Right

MLB debut
- April 28, 1915, for the Brooklyn Robins

Last MLB appearance
- August 10, 1924, for the New York Giants

MLB statistics
- Win–loss record: 68–72
- Earned run average: 3.14
- Strikeouts: 445
- Stats at Baseball Reference

Teams
- Brooklyn Robins (1915–1923); Chicago White Sox (1923); New York Giants (1924); MLB records: Most innings pitched in a game (tied with Joe Oeschger): 26

Leon Joseph Cadore (November 20, 1891 – March 16, 1958) was an American right-handed pitcher in Major League Baseball from 1915 to 1924.

Cadore is best known for holding the Major League Baseball (MLB) record for the most innings pitched in a single game. In 1920, both Cadore and Joe Oeschger pitched 26 innings for their respective teams in a game that was eventually called a tie due to darkness.

== Early life ==
Born in Chicago, Illinois, Cadore was orphaned at 13 and went to live with his uncle, Joe Jeannot, in northern Idaho in Hope, a village east of Sandpoint on the shore of Lake Pend Oreille. Cadore graduated from Sandpoint High School, then attended Gonzaga University in Spokane from 1906 to 1908. He played college baseball for the Gonzaga Bulldogs.

== Professional baseball career ==
Cadore played for the Brooklyn Robins from 1915 to 1923 and then finished his MLB career with the Chicago White Sox in 1923 and New York Giants in 1924. He compiled a career win–loss record of 68–72. Cadore was a roommate of Casey Stengel while with the Robins.

Cadore is best known for his performance in a 1920 game in which both he and Joe Oeschger pitched all 26 innings for their respective teams before the game was called a tie due to darkness. Cadore faced 96 batters in the game, an MLB record dating back to at least 1901. He and Oeschger share the MLB record for most innings pitched in a single game.

Cadore served as an officer in the U.S. Army during World War I.

== Personal life ==
Cadore married Maie Ebbets, daughter of Brooklyn Robins owner Charles Ebbets. After a career on Wall Street in the 1920s, they moved to Hope in the 1930s to mine the family copper interests. His wife died in 1950, and he succumbed to cancer at the age 66 at the Veterans Hospital in Spokane, Washington, in 1958. Cadore was buried at Pinecrest Memorial Park in Sandpoint.

On September 28, 1955, Cadore appeared on the television game show I've Got a Secret, regarding his pitching of the 26-inning game.

Preceded by Rube Marquard	Brooklyn Robins Opening Day starting pitcher 1919–1921	Succeeded by Dutch Ruether
