= Walton Cruise =

American baseball player (1890–1975)

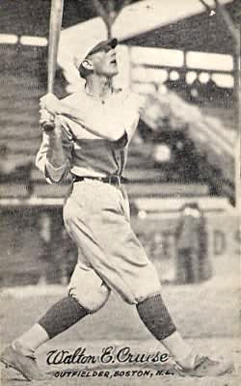
- Outfielder
- Born: May 6, 1890; Childersburg, Alabama, U.S.
- Died: January 9, 1975 (aged 84); Sylacauga, Alabama, U.S.
- Batted: Left Threw: Right

MLB debut
- April 14, 1914, for the St. Louis Cardinals

Last MLB appearance
- May 22, 1924, for the Boston Braves

MLB statistics
- Batting average: .277
- Home runs: 30
- Runs batted in: 272
- Stats at Baseball Reference

Teams
- St. Louis Cardinals (1914, 1916–1919); Boston Braves (1919–1924)

Walton Edwin Cruise (May 6, 1890 – January 9, 1975) was an American outfielder for the St. Louis Cardinals (1914, 1916–1919) and Boston Braves (1919–1924).

In 10 seasons, he played in 736 games and had 2,321 at bats, 293 runs, 644 hits, 83 doubles, 39 triples, 30 home runs, 272 RBI, 49 stolen bases, 238 walks, a .277 batting average, a .348 on-base percentage, a .386 slugging percentage, 895 total bases, and 79 sacrifice hits.

He died in Sylacauga, Alabama, at the age of 84.

== Sources ==
- Career statistics from Baseball Reference · Baseball Reference (Minors) · Retrosheet · Baseball Almanac
